= McFly discography =

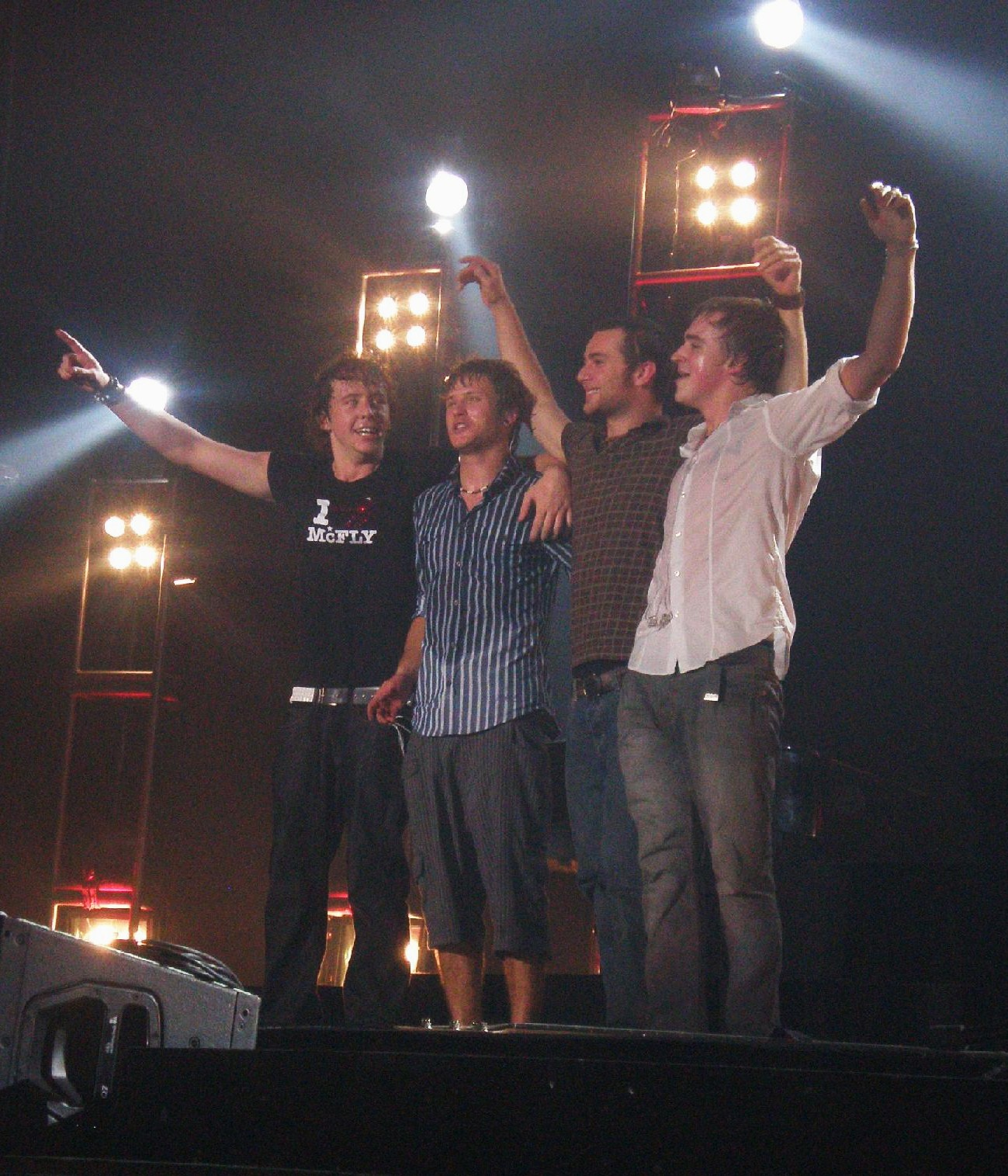
- McFly performing at Wembley Arena in December 2007
- Studio albums: 7
- Soundtrack albums: 1
- Live albums: 4
- Compilation albums: 3
- Singles: 26
- Music videos: 26

The discography of English pop rock band McFly consists of 26 singles, 25 music videos, seven studio albums, three compilation albums, four live albums and one soundtrack.

== Albums ==
=== Studio albums ===
Title	Album details	Peak chart positions				Certifications (sales thresholds)
Title	Album details	UK	IRL	JPN	EU	Certifications (sales thresholds)
Room on the 3rd Floor	Released: 5 July 2004; Label: Island (#MCD60094); Formats: CD, cassette	1	19	26	—	BPI: 2× Platinum
Wonderland	Released: 29 August 2005; Label: Island (#MCDX60099); Formats: CD	1	11	61	9	BPI: Platinum
Motion in the Ocean	Released: 6 November 2006; Label: Island (#1712727); Formats: CD	6	23	89	23	BPI: Platinum
Radio:Active	Released: 22 September 2008; Label: Super (#SUPRCD1); Formats: CD, CD+DVD	8	26	49	34	BPI: Gold
Above the Noise	Released: 15 November 2010; Label: Island; Formats: CD	20	79	—	41	BPI: Gold
Young Dumb Thrills	Released: 13 November 2020; Label: BMG; Formats: CD, vinyl, cassette	2	23	—	—	
Power to Play	Released: 9 June 2023; Label: BMG; Format: CD, vinyl, cassette	2	51	—	—	BPI: Gold
"—" denotes single that did not chart or was not released

==== As McBusted ====
Title	Album details	Peak chart positions			Certifications (sales thresholds)
Title	Album details	UK	IRL	JPN	Certifications (sales thresholds)
McBusted	Released: 1 December 2014; Label: Island; Formats: CD	9	31	147	BPI: Gold

=== Compilation albums ===
Title	Album details	Peak chart positions			Certifications
Title	Album details	UK	EU	IRL	Certifications
All the Greatest Hits	Released: 5 November 2007; Label: Island (#1749098); Format: CD	4	18	20	BPI: Platinum
The Greatest Bits: B-Sides and Rarities	Released: 3 December 2007; Label: Island; Format: CD; Available from Woolworths stores only	83	—	—	
Memory Lane: The Best of McFly	Released: 26 November 2012; Label: Island; Formats: CD, Digital download	21	—	79	BPI: Platinum
The Lost Songs (Note: "The Lost Songs" is a compilation album of demos released weekly in November 2019.)	Released: 3 July 2020; Label: Super Records; Formats: Streaming, Digital download	—	—	—	
"—" denotes single that did not chart or was not released

=== Live albums ===
Title	Album details	Notes
Motion in the Ocean: Tour Edition	Released: 14 May 2007; Label: Island; Formats: CD+DVD	The 'Tour Edition' of Motion in the Ocean reached #14 on the UK Albums chart. It included a bonus DVD featuring a concert from the self-titled tour.
iTunes Live: London Festival 2008	Released: 4 August 2008; Label: iTunes; Formats: Digital download	Available exclusively through iTunes web store
Radio:Active – Live at Wembley Arena	Released: 16 June 2009; Label: Super Records; Formats: CD	Released in Brazil only
McFly 10: Live at the Royal Albert Hall	Released: 26 December 2013; Label: Island; Formats: CD+DVD, digital download	CD/DVD was taken from the Saturday 21 September show. The digital download was taken from the Sunday 22 September show.
Anthology Tour: The Hits Live	Released: 2 December 2016; Label: Island; Formats: CD, digital download	Individually numbered limited-edition boxed set available through their official website only (since released on digital download). A standard 14 track CD was also issued
21 Live	Released: 21 March 2025; Label: Island; Formats: CD, LP, digital download	Live recording from the 21st anniversary concert, which was also shown on ITV

=== Soundtrack albums ===
Year	Album details	Notes
Just My Luck	Released: 12 May 2006; Label: Island; Formats: CD, Cassette	Reached number 25 on the Top Heatseekers Chart

== Singles ==
=== As McFly ===
Year	Single	Peak chart positions				Certifications	Album
Year	Single	UK	EU	IRL	SCO	Certifications	Album
2004	"5 Colours in Her Hair"	1	5	7	1	BPI: Gold	Room on the 3rd Floor
2004	"Obviously"	1	7	14	1	BPI: Platinum	Room on the 3rd Floor
2004	"That Girl"	3	10	13	2		Room on the 3rd Floor
2004	"Room on the 3rd Floor"	5	—	27	5		Room on the 3rd Floor
2005	"All About You/You've Got a Friend"	1	2	1	1	BPI: 2× Platinum	Wonderland
2005	"I'll Be OK"	1	6	8	1		Wonderland
2005	"I Wanna Hold You"	3	12	15	3		Wonderland
2005	"Ultraviolet/The Ballad of Paul K"	9	34	25	9		Wonderland
2006	"Please, Please/Don't Stop Me Now"	1	4	15	1		Motion in the Ocean
2006	"Star Girl"	1	7	14	1	BPI: Platinum	Motion in the Ocean
2006	"Sorry's Not Good Enough/Friday Night"	3	11	29	5		Motion in the Ocean
2007	"Baby's Coming Back/Transylvania"	1	8	16	1		Motion in the Ocean
2007	"The Heart Never Lies"	3	12	16	3	BPI: Silver	All the Greatest Hits
2008	"One for the Radio"	2	12	20	1		Radio:Active
2008	"Lies"	4	14	30	1		Radio:Active
2008	"Do Ya/Stay with Me"	18	53	—	3		Radio:Active
2010	"Party Girl"	6	20	31	7		Above the Noise
2010	"Shine a Light" (featuring Taio Cruz)	4	20	13	3	BPI: Platinum	Above the Noise
2011	"That's the Truth"	35	—	—	38		Above the Noise
2012	"Love Is Easy"	10	35	40	8	BPI: Silver; ARIA: Platinum; RMNZ: Gold	Memory Lane: The Best of McFly
2013	"Love Is on the Radio"	6	47	20	5		Non-album single
2020	"Happiness"	— (Note: "Happiness" did not enter the UK Singles Chart but peaked at number 18 on the UK Singles Downloads Chart.)	—	—	26		Young Dumb Thrills
2020	"Tonight Is the Night"	— (Note: "Tonight Is the Night" did not enter the UK Singles Chart but peaked at number 19 on the UK Singles Downloads Chart.)	—	—	44		Young Dumb Thrills
2021	"You're Not Special"	—	—	—	—		Young Dumb Thrills
2023	"Where Did All the Guitars Go?"	— (Note: "Where Did All The Guitars Go?" did not enter the Official UK Top 100 Chart, but debuted and peaked at number 26 on the Official Singles Downloads Chart Top 100.)	—	—	—		Power to Play
2023	"God of Rock & Roll"	—	—	—	—		Power to Play
2023	"Honey I'm Home"	—	—	—	—		Power to Play
2023	"Broken by You"(featuring Fresno)	—	—	—	—		Non-album single
2024	"It's All Coming Back to Me Now" (with Danny Jones)	— (Note: "It's All Coming Back to Me Now" did not enter the UK Singles Chart but debuted and peaked at number 2 on the UK Singles Downloads Chart.)	—	—	—		Non-album single
"—" denotes single that did not chart or was not released

=== As McBusted ===
Year	Single	Peak chart positions		Album
Year	Single	UK	SCO	Album
2014	"Air Guitar"	12	14	McBusted
2015	"Get Over It"	82	—	McBusted

== Other charted songs ==
Year	Song	Peak chart positions
Year	Song	UK
2005	"My Generation" (Note: The Who cover recorded for the Teenage Cancer Trust with Roger Daltrey of The Who and released as a download through HMV.com.)	78
2007	"You're the One That I Want" (Note: John Travolta and Olivia Newton-John cover recorded exclusively for the Over the Rainbow charity album.)	161
2007	"Umbrella" (Note: Rihanna cover released as the B-side to "The Heart Never Lies" CD single.)	159
2009	"Falling in Love" (Note: Taken from Radio:Active, this track was released in Brazil as an official single.)	87
2013	"Love Is on the Radio" (Silent Aggression mix) (Note: Digital download only featuring Dougie Poynter on lead vocals.)	135
2024	"The Reason featuring McFly" (Note: Digital download only by AVA)	

== Video albums ==
Title	Details
The Wonderland Tour 2005	Released: 28 November 2005
All the Greatest Hits (The DVD)	Released: 3 December 2007
Radio:Active – Live at Wembley	Released: 11 May 2009
Behind the Noise	Released: 15 November 2010 (ASDA stores only)
Nowhere Left to Run	Released: 29 November 2010
McFly 10: Live at the Royal Albert Hall	Released: 27 December 2013
McFly Live at the O2 Arena	Released: 20 November 2020 (Streaming on McFly Total Access only)

As McBusted

Title	Details
Live at the O2 & TourPlay	Released: 24 November 2014
McBusted's Most Excellent Adventure Tour	Released: 22 June 2015
