= Nowhere Left to Run =

2010 film by Julian Gibbs

- Directed by: Julian Gibbs
- Written by: Joe Barton
- Produced by: Jo Allen
- Starring: Tom Fletcher; Danny Jones; Harry Judd; Dougie Poynter
- Release date: 29 November 2010
- Running time: 38 minutes
- Country: United Kingdom
- Language: English

Nowhere Left to Run is a 2010 short film starring English pop rock band McFly, which was shot over three days. The film was first screened through the group's official website on 13 October 2010. The film features the band playing versions of themselves, with a vampire-themed twist. The film features seven songs from their fifth studio album, Above the Noise. The film was released on DVD on 29 November 2010 in the UK.

== Plot ==
The opening of the film shows Dougie being chased though the woods by several fanged fangirls. He then enters a church where he holds the doors closed to prevent them from following him and shouts at the heavens. It then cuts to the band being interviewed three days earlier about their new album, with Harry acting strangely. When the interview is finished he is seen entering the dressing room of the interviewer. The band is then told by their manager that they are to finish recording their new album in a new location, away from all distractions. In the mansion that they are to record in, they see a news report about how the presenter who had interviewed them is missing and her dressing room has been found covered in blood. Their manager dismisses the bands concerns and Harry laughs saying how she was happy the last time he saw her. He then follows the cleaning lady out of the room and proceeds to make out with her and bite her neck, revealing that he is a vampire. The band are then shown performing "Party Girl".

Tom expresses concern about Harry's behaviour to the other two members of the band but Danny defends him, saying that he is just enjoying himself. The band then perform "Shine a Light", and the cleaning lady is shown waking up as a vampire. She is then confronted with a cross by the band's manager (showing that he is aware of what Harry is), before he enters the studio and suggests that the band have a party. During the party, with all female guests, Danny goes outside to where Tom is sitting alone, and they again discuss Harry's behaviour. When he goes back inside he finds that everyone (apart from Dougie) has joined Harry upstairs in his room. Harry is then shown having sex and biting all of the females he is with, while the rest of the band joins Tom outside. Tom then spots the cleaning lady in the grounds and goes after her, leading to him being pinned down on the ground and attempting to bite him. He pushes her off and runs to Danny and Dougie telling them what's happened but they openly laugh at his suggestion that she had fangs.

The next morning at breakfast, they again dismiss Tom's concerns. Harry refuses to record (preferring to continue with the females from the previous night), and the band therefore decide to replace him. When Harry discovers this, he gets two female vampires to kill the replacement by suffocating him with a plastic bag. Meanwhile, the TV presenter arrives in the gym as Dougie is working out and attempts to bite him. Danny and Tom arrive, and she is burnt to dust by sunlight. They then attempt to run away but meet their manager who shows them what Harry has done to the replacement drummer, making them decide that they have to kill him. They are then shown modifying their instruments so that they can be used to do this. All of the band then perform "End of the World", with Harry being electrocuted halfway through, so that he is thrown onto the floor. The rest of the band then use the arm of a broken guitar as a stake with another guitar as a hammer to drive it through. After they've killed him; Tom is attacked (and bitten) by the cleaning lady and Dougie and Danny are chased out of the mansion by a group of female vampires.

Danny sees their manager lying dead next to his car and calls to Dougie telling him "don't go into the woods" (which he ignores). Danny then tries to start the car to drive away but one of the vampires is in the back seat ready to attack him. The opening scene is then repeated, with Dougie being chased into the church.

== Cast ==
- Tom Fletcher - Himself
- Danny Jones - Himself
- Harry Judd - Himself
- Dougie Poynter - Himself
- Luke Healy - Manager
- Leanne Michael - Cleaner
- Nic Sleight - Replacement drummer
- Lucy Edwards - TV presenter

== Special features ==
1. "Outtakes" 3:00
2. "The Making Of" 29:00
3. "Party Girl Video" 3:13
4. "Shine A Light Video" 3:39
5. "End of the World Video" 4:04
6. "Trailer" 1:00
