= Radio:Active Live at Wembley =

Video by McFly
- Released: 11 May 2009
- Recorded: Wembley Arena, London
- Genre: Pop punk, pop rock
- Length: 150:00
- Label: Super Records / EMI Brazil / EMI Spain
- Director: Paul Caslin
- Producer: Audrey Daverport, JJ Stereo

McFly chronology
All the Greatest Hits (The DVD) (2007)	Radio:Active Live at Wembley (2009)

Radio:Active Live at Wembley is a DVD by English pop punk band McFly. The DVD was filmed at Wembley Arena in London, during their Radio:Active Tour on 27 November 2008. The DVD includes over 80 minutes of concert footage, filmed by Grammy-nominated director Paul Caslin, as well as a 90-minute documentary on the band's tour.

Sonora, the largest digital music website in Brazil, issued six live recordings via their YouTube channel. The DVD topped the British DVD charts, and stayed in first position for three weeks. The concert was also issued as a live album.

== DVD track listing ==
Concert footage

1. One for the Radio
2. Everybody Knows
3. Going Through the Motions
4. Obviously
5. Transylvania
6. Corrupted
7. POV
8. Falling in Love
9. Star Girl
10. That Girl
11. Do Ya
12. Black or White
13. Room on the 3rd Floor
14. All About You
15. The Last Song
16. Lies
17. 5 Colours in Her Hair

=== Notes ===
- "Going Through the Motions", "Corrupted", "Black or White" and "The Last Song" were only performed on the European leg of the tour.
- For the opening show at Curitiba Master Hall "The Heart Never Lies" and "Please, Please" were added to the setlist.

== Album track listing ==
Radio:Active Live at Wembley

Live album by McFly
- Released: 18 June 2009
- Recorded: Wembley Arena, London
- Genre: Pop punk
- Length: 59:33
- Label: EMI Brazil
- Director: Paul Caslin
- Producer: Audrey Daverport, JJ Stereo

McFly chronology
Radio:Active (2008)	Radio:Active Live at Wembley (2009)

An album containing 12 recordings from the concert was issued around the same time as the DVD, mainly for their South American fans. It came in a standard jewel case.

1. One for the Radio
2. Corrupted
3. Obviously
4. Falling in Love
5. Star Girl
6. Do Ya?
7. Black or White
8. Room on the 3rd Floor
9. All About You
10. The Last Song
11. Lies
12. 5 Colours in Her Hair

== Release history ==
Region	Date	Label	Format
Brazil	8 May 2009	EMI Music Brazil	Digital Download
Brazil	18 May 2009	EMI Music Brazil	DVD, CD
United Kingdom	11 May 2009	Super Records	DVD, CD
Spain	1 December 2009	EMI Music Spain	DVD, CD

== Chart performance ==
Chart	Position
United Kingdom	1
Brazil	1

== Tour dates ==
These tour dates are taken from setlist.fm.

Date	City	Country	Venue
South America
October 5	Curitiba	Brazil	Curitiba Master Hall
October 8	São Paulo	Brazil	Via Funchal
October 9	São Paulo	Brazil	Via Funchal
October 10	Rio de Janeiro	Brazil	Vivo Rio
Europe
November 7	Sheffield	England	Sheffield Arena
November 8	Newcastle	England	Metro Radio Arena
November 10	Belfast	Northern Ireland	Odyssey Arena
November 11	Dublin	Ireland	RDS Simmonscourt
November 14	Birmingham	England	LG Arena
November 15	Bournemouth	England	Bournemouth International Centre
November 16	Plymouth	England	Plymouth Pavilions
November 18	Brighton	England	Brighton Centre
November 19	Cardiff	Wales	Cardiff International Arena
November 21	Nottingham	England	Trent FM Arena Nottingham
November 22	Manchester	England	Manchester Evening News Arena
November 24	Aberdeen	Scotland	Aberdeen Exhibition and Conference Centre
November 25	Glasgow	Scotland	Scottish Exhibition and Conference Centre
November 27	London	England	Wembley Arena
November 28	Liverpool	England	Echo Arena

== See also ==
- Radio:Active
