= Super Records =

- Parent company: Universal Music Group
- Founded: 2008
- Founder: Tom Fletcher, Dougie Poynter, Danny Jones, Harry Judd
- Distributors: 2010 Universal Records Island Records; 2008-2009 Absolute (Universal); EMI Brazil; Avex Trax; EMI International; Warner Music (Singapore and Philippines)
- Genre: Pop punk
- Country of origin: United Kingdom
- Location: (United Kingdom) London
- Official website: www.SuperRecords.com

Super Records Ltd. is a British independent record label, owned and operated by the English band McFly.

== Formation ==
McFly's debut album was released on Island Records in 2004. Room on the 3rd Floor went to number one, making them the youngest UK group to do so since The Beatles.

However, after an issue involving creative differences, McFly parted ways with Island Records and set up their own label, Super Records Ltd. McFly insist the parting from Universal was amicable but that they wanted to be in complete creative control.

== Distribution ==
Everything that Super Records Ltd. produced before 2010 was distributed by other major labels in different countries. This was before McFly re-signing with Universal Island Records as part of a 50/50 deal, therefore making Universal worldwide distributors of Super Records releases.

== History ==
The first release from Super Records is "One for the Radio", from their album Radio:ACTIVE. A ten-track version of the album was released free with the Mail on Sunday. This was followed by the full, deluxe version of the album featuring a bonus DVD, four extra songs and a 32-page booklet released in the United Kingdom and Ireland on 22 September 2008.

In 2010, McFly announced they had re-signed with Universal as part of a 50/50 partnership deal between Universal and Super Records.

== Artists ==
- McFly (2008–present)
- McBusted (2013–15)
- James Bourne (2013–present)
- Matt Willis (2013–15)
- Tom Fletcher
- Danny Jones
- Harry Judd
- Dougie Poynter

== Discography ==
=== Album ===
Album	Peak chart positions			
Album	UK	IRE	EU	JPN
Radio:Active	8	26	34	49

=== Singles ===
Song	Peak chart positions		
Song	UK	IRE	EU
"One for the Radio"	2	20	12
"Lies"	4	30	14
"Do Ya/Stay With Me"	18	—	53
"Falling in Love"	87	—	—
"Party Girl"	6	31	20
"Shine A Light"	4	13	20
"Love is on the Radio"	10	—	—

=== DVD ===
Radio:Active Live at Wembley was released on 11 May 2009, and is the first number one that Super Records have produced.
