= Love Is Easy (McFly song) =

2012 single by McFly

Single by McFly

from the album Memory Lane: The Best of McFly
- Released: 11 November 2012
- Recorded: 2012
- Genre: Folk pop
- Length: 3:41
- Label: Island
- Songwriters: Tom Fletcher; Danny Jones; Dougie Poynter; Antony Brant

McFly singles chronology
"That's the Truth" (2011)	"Love Is Easy" (2012)	"Love Is on the Radio" (2013)

Music video
- "Love Is Easy" on YouTube

"Love Is Easy" is a song by English pop rock band McFly which serves as the lead single from their second greatest hits album, Memory Lane: The Best of McFly. The song was written by McFly members Tom Fletcher, Danny Jones and Dougie Poynter as well as Antony Brant. Its music video was released on 24 October 2012, showing the band performing the song in a stage show that makes references to moments throughout their career.

It was released on 11 November 2012, debuting at No. 10 on the UK Singles Chart and peaking at numbers 13 and 21 in Australia and New Zealand, respectively. The song became the band's first song to chart in Australia; McFly had previously scored a minor hit in New Zealand with "Transylvania" in 2007. The song also briefly charted in the Indonesian Top 40, hitting a high of No. 32.

An alternate version of the song, titled "Love Is Easy (Dougie Style)", which features Dougie Poynter on lead vocals, was released on 7 December 2012 to download.

== Background and composition ==
"Love Is Easy" is unlike other McFly singles as it heavily features the ukulele, being the first song that Tom Fletcher had written using it; Fletcher explains "[the band] wrote most of the melody first and that was just inspired because I bought a ukulele and that was the first song I wrote on it really". According to Dougie Poynter, the song was partly inspired by the film Love Actually, saying "that moment in 'Love Actually' when one of the porn couple says 'all I want for Christmas is you', that moment there was our inspiration". The song also incorporates a quote from the 1946 film It's a Wonderful Life. This is the first McFly single that hasn't been released as a CD single.

== Chart performance ==
"Love Is Easy" debuted on the UK Singles Chart at number ten on the week commencing 24 November 2012, becoming the band's eighteenth top ten hit in the country. Sustained support from commercial radio also ensured a prolonged tenure on the UK Singles Chart, extending to 14 consecutive weeks, as of the week commencing 17 February 2013. It has also charted at number eight in Scotland and number forty in Ireland.

The song has become McFly's first single to chart in Australia, debuting at number eighty on the week commencing 14 January 2013, before storming up to number 13 in the Australian singles chart. Tom Fletcher announced via Twitter, on 9 March 2013, that the single had been certified Platinum in Australia, passing 70,000 copies sold in the country.

== Music video ==
The music video for "Love Is Easy" was released on 24 October 2012. It shows the members of McFly performing in a stage show as they make references to music videos and album covers from their career. It is directed by David Spearing of Big Fat Panda Productions and features as the entirety of the background artists, members of comedy collective BattleActs.

== Format and track listing ==
- Digital download
1. "Love Is Easy" – 3:41
2. "Love Is Easy" (Dougie style) – 3:44
3. "Love Is Easy" (Ukulele version) - 4:07
4. "Love Is Easy" (Music video)

== Charts ==
=== Weekly charts ===
Chart (2012–2013)	Peak position
Australia (ARIA)	13
Ireland (IRMA)	40
New Zealand (Recorded Music NZ)	21
Scotland Singles (OCC)	8
Slovakia Airplay (ČNS IFPI)	9
UK Singles (OCC)	10

=== Year-end charts ===
Chart (2013)	Position
Australia (ARIA)	78

== Certifications ==
Region	Certification	Certified units/sales
Australia (ARIA)	Platinum	70,000^{^}
New Zealand (RMNZ)	Platinum	15,000^{*}
United Kingdom (BPI)	Gold	400,000^{‡}
^{*} Sales figures based on certification alone.^{^} Shipments figures based on certification alone.^{‡} Sales+streaming figures based on certification alone.

== Release history ==
Country	Date	Format
United Kingdom	11 November 2012	Digital download
