= Do Ya / Stay with Me =

"Do Ya"

Single by McFly

from the album Radio:Active
- Released: 24 November 2008
- Genre: Pop punk
- Length: 2:54 ("Do Ya"); 4:27 ("Stay with Me")
- Label: Super, EMI
- Songwriters: Tom Fletcher, Danny Jones, Dougie Poynter, James Bourne ("Do Ya"); Rod Stewart, Ronnie Wood ("Stay with Me")
- Producers: Jason Perry, Danny Jones

McFly singles chronology
"Lies" (2008)	"Do Ya" / "Stay with Me" (2008)	"Falling in Love" (2009)

"Do Ya" and "Stay with Me" are two songs by English pop rock band McFly, released as a double A-side single. It served as the third single from their fourth album, Radio:Active, and was the official Children in Need single for 2008. It was released for download on 23 November 2008 and physically on 24 November 2008. "Stay with Me" is a cover of a song by Faces and was the main Children in Need single. McFly performed both tracks live on Children in Need 2008 on 14 November 2008. "Do Ya" appears on the international soundtrack to the Brazilian telenovela, Três Irmãs.

== Chart performance ==
On 30 November 2008, the single debuted on the UK Singles Chart at number 18 after both physical and digital releases of the song was made available. This marked the first time McFly had ever missed the UK top 10. Previously, their lowest-charting single had been "Ultraviolet" / "The Ballad of Paul K", which peaked at number nine, their first not to reach the top five. The single stayed in the UK top 100 for only two weeks. It was also the lowest-charting Children In Need charity single since "Perfect Day" topped the chart in 1997, until the 2011 cover of "Teardrop" peaked lower at number 24.

== Music video ==
The video for "Do Ya" is approximately four minutes long, and was released via their YouTube account and their Myspace page. The video begins in a house, where people gather for Christmas, and start opening their presents, which had a McFly member in it. As soon as the band comes out of the boxes, they begin to play the song. More guests arrive, and soon, zombies arrive at the house. McFly are scared out at the end of the song, and exit via their van and off to the moon.

The video for "Do Ya", along with the Christmas Radio:ACTIVE album advert that was recorded at the same time, were controversially refused airplay for being 'too scary' and for the fear of being copied by young viewers (when the McFly members were inside Christmas presents). Eventually, though, it earned airplay on TMF Most Wanted.

== Track listing ==
UK CD
No.	Title	Writer(s)	Length
1.	"Do Ya"	Fletcher / Jones / Poynter / Bourne	2:55
2.	"Stay With Me"	Stewart / Wood	4:29
3.	"I Kissed a Girl" (Radio 1 Live Lounge)	Perry / Gottwald / Martin / Dennis	3:16
4.	"Lies"	Fletcher / Jones / Poynter	3:46
Total length:			14:26

UK DVD
No.	Title	Writer(s)	Length
1.	"Do Ya"	Fletcher / Jones / Poynter / Bourne	2:54
2.	"Stay With Me"	Stewart / Wood	4:27
3.	"Making of the 'Do Ya' video" (Video)		3:00
4.	"McFly in Brazil" (Video)		30:00
Total length:			40:21

== Charts ==
Chart	Position
Europe (European Hot 100)	53
UK Singles (Official Charts)	18
UK Airplay (Music Week)	16

== Release history ==
Region	Date	Label	Format
Republic of Ireland	20 November 2008	Super Records	CD, Digital download
United Kingdom	23 November 2008	Super Records	Digital download
United Kingdom	24 November 2008	Super Records	CD
Brazil	12 January 2009	EMI Music Brazil	Airplay
