= Love Is on the Radio =

2013 single by McFly

Single by McFly
- Released: 24 November 2013
- Recorded: 2013
- Genre: Pop rock, country
- Length: 4:05
- Label: Super
- Songwriter(s): Tom Fletcher; Danny Jones; James Bourne
- Producer(s): Jason Perry; Danny Jones

McFly singles chronology
| "Love Is Easy" (2012) | "Love Is on the Radio" (2013) | "Happiness" (2020) |

"Love Is on the Radio" is a song by the English pop rock band McFly, released on 24 November 2013 as the lead single from their since shelved sixth studio album.

Alternative versions of the song were released on the same day, including the Silent Aggression Mix, McBusted Mix and Hopeful Live Mix, while the Me & Mrs F Mix was released on 26 November. The McBusted mix was the first release by Busted in nine years and version was available to pre-order alongside McBusted Tour tickets, as well as on iTunes. The demo version of "Love Is on the Radio" was available to buy with a CD bundle.

== Track listings ==
Digital EP
| No. | Title | Writer(s) | Length |
|---|---|---|---|
| 1. | "Love is on the Radio" (Radio Edit) | Tom Fletcher, Danny Jones, James Bourne | 3:48 |
| 2. | "Love is on the Radio" | Fletcher, Jones, Bourne | 4:05 |
| 3. | "McFly: The Musical" (Live at the Royal Albert Hall) | Fletcher, Jones, Dougie Poynter, Harry Judd | 10:30 |

Digital download – Silent Aggression Mix
| No. | Title | Writer(s) | Length |
|---|---|---|---|
| 1. | "Love is on the Radio" (Silent Aggression Mix) | Fletcher, Jones, Bourne | 3:25 |

Digital download – McBusted Mix
| No. | Title | Writer(s) | Length |
|---|---|---|---|
| 1. | "Love is on the Radio" (McBusted Mix) (featuring Busted) | Fletcher, Jones, Bourne | 4:14 |

Digital download – Hopeful Live Mix
| No. | Title | Writer(s) | Length |
|---|---|---|---|
| 1. | "Love is on the Radio" (Hopeful Live Mix) | Fletcher, Jones, Bourne | 3:30 |

Digital download – Me & Mrs F Mix
| No. | Title | Writer(s) | Length |
|---|---|---|---|
| 1. | "Love is on the Radio" (Me & Mrs F Mix) | Fletcher, Jones, Bourne | 4:19 |

Digital download – Love Is on the Radio (Original Demo)
| No. | Title | Writer(s) | Length |
|---|---|---|---|
| 1. | "Love is on the Radio" (Original Demo) | Fletcher, Jones, Bourne | 4:21 |

== Charts ==
| Chart (2013) | Peak position |
|---|---|
| Ireland (IRMA) | 20 |
| Scotland (OCC) | 5 |
| UK Singles (OCC) | 6 |
| UK Singles Downloads (OCC) | 10 |
| UK Indie (OCC) | 1 |

== Release history ==
| Region | Date | Format |
|---|---|---|
| Ireland | 24 November 2013 | Digital download |
| United Kingdom | 24 November 2013 | Digital download |
| United States | 24 November 2013 | Digital download |
