= Lies (McFly song) =

2008 single by McFly

- CD1 single

Single by McFly

from the album Radio:Active
- Released: 15 September 2008
- Recorded: 2008
- Genre: Pop rock
- Length: 3:49
- Label: Super, EMI
- Songwriter(s): Tom Fletcher, Danny Jones, Dougie Poynter
- Producer(s): Jason Perry

McFly singles chronology
"One for the Radio" (2008)	"Lies" (2008)	"Do Ya" / "Stay with Me" (2008)

"Lies" is the fifteenth single from British pop rock band, McFly, released on 15 September 2008. "Lies" did not feature on the promotional 10-track copy of the album Radio:Active which was given away in The Mail on Sunday in July 2008, however it features as one of the four additional tracks on the retail edition of the album, which was released on 22 September 2008. The lead vocals for the song are split between band members Danny Jones and Tom Fletcher, with vocal contributions from bassist Dougie Poynter. Upon release, the song reached No. 4 on the UK Singles Chart and No. 1 on the Scottish Singles Chart.

== Background ==
"Lyrically, Lies is definitely the darkest song we've ever written," says Tom Fletcher, who shares vocals on the track with Danny Jones. "It's about a real bitch of a girl who is out for herself and doesn't care who she uses to get what she wants. We did have a girl in mind when we wrote it, but really it's an amalgam of several girls we have met along the way. We hope she burns in hell at the end. A real good time tune then!" On 17 September 2008 the song was added to both BBC Radio 1 and BBC Radio 2's A-Lists.

== Chart performance ==
"Lies" debuted at number No. 4, it sold 26,071 on the UK Singles Chart in its first week on sale. It peaked at No. 1 on the Scottish Singles Chart, giving McFly their ninth number-one single there. "Lies" has received a Platinum sales status certification for sales of over 60,000 copies in the Brazil. The song appears on the international soundtrack to the Brazilian telenovela Caminho das Índias.

== Music video ==
The full music video is just over 6 minutes long, and received its premiere on Channel 4's teen strand, T4 on 23 August 2008, and Brazil its premiere on MTV Brasil on 7 October 2008. The video, directed by the duo Chris Hopewell and Ben Foley.

The music video takes place in an apocalyptic world where water is scarce and therefore a source of power.

The opening monologue of the video.

"Now We have only the memories, of a green and pleasant land that lies below the countless fathoms. The lifeless seas, filthy and reeking, crept up on mankind, inch by inch. Slowly his clever water powered world ground to a halt. Brother fought Brother, Nation fought Nation. But there are those who flourish in this blight of times, they cleanse the water. Make it pure again. For a Price. Only the strong and the quick survive, living off their animal cunning, always mobile in the endless search of the life bringing water. In their cities of fire and steel, these all powerful water barons, now run the world. Holding all to ransom in a firestorm of fear."

In the start of the video, it starts with a monologue as the band are in a water powered van in the vast and lonely landscape. However the van grinds to a halt as the water cells that power the van have stopped working as they ran out of water. They then push their van towards the closest civilization they can find. However being watched by one of the water barons.

As they then reach the city, they are met with some of the security and guides to bring them around the city to get what they are looking for however throughout the path, they encounter different people and surroundings as they get pushed along towards to where they need to get the cleaned water. Once they get to where they are needed they get stopped by the Water baron of the city and they get sent off to be at the stage as a way of "payment". Then the boys are on a stage performing as everything is made from loads of scrap objects. They then had enough of performing and then get into a fight with some of the members of the Barons gang. Initially they beat them away only leaving Tom and the baroness to fight it off. It seemed the baron would have won however Tom defeats the baroness. In the light of a celebration however, a big chainsaw wielding thug comes out. The boys then decide it's best to leave as they take whatever they can and fuel up. They then leave in their van, however by the end of the video the van breaks down on their escape.

The video ends as the baroness and the chainsaw thug go after them as the screen quickly blacks out. Unsure if the boys have escaped. The baroness is played by Jo-Emma Larvin.

== Track listing ==
UK CD1

1. "Lies" (Album Version) - 3:46
2. "Winner Takes It All" (Acoustic) - 4:17

UK CD2

1. "Lies" (Album Version) - 3:46
2. "Going Through The Motions" (Live) - 3:49
3. "The End" (Acoustic) - 3:42
4. "Interview" - 11:26

UK DVD single

1. "Lies" (Full-Length Video) - 6:06
2. "Behind the Scenes Documentary - The "Lies" Video Shoot"
3. "Lies" (Audio) - 3:49
4. "Additional McFly Footage"

== Charts ==
=== Weekly charts ===
Chart (2008)	Peak position
Europe (Eurochart Hot 100)	14
Ireland (IRMA)	30
Scotland (OCC)	1
UK Singles (OCC)	4
UK Airplay (Music Week)	25

=== Year-end charts ===
Chart (2008)	Position
UK Singles (OCC)	159

== Certifications ==
Region	Certification	Certified units/sales
Brazil (Pro-Música Brasil)	Platinum	60,000^{*}
^{*} Sales figures based on certification alone.

== Release history ==
Region	Date	Label	Format
iTunes	7 September 2008	Super Records	digital download
United Kingdom	8 September 2008	Super Records	Digital Download
United Kingdom	15 September 2008	Super Records	CD Single
Ireland	11 September 2008	Super Records	CD, Digital download
Brazil	20 October 2008	EMI Music Brazil	Airplay
Japan	26 November 2008	Avex Trax	CD Single, Digital download
Chile	February 2009	EMI Music	Airplay
Mexico & Argentina	July 2009	EMI Music	Airplay
