= Top Gear of the Pops =

- The Top Gear of the Pops opening title
- Presented by: Jeremy Clarkson; Richard Hammond; James May
- Country of origin: United Kingdom

Production
- Running time: 30 minutes

Original release
- Network: BBC Two
- Release: 16 March 2007

Related
- Top of the Pops, Top Gear

Top Gear of the Pops is a one-off special programme that aired for BBC Two on 16 March 2007, as part of Red Nose Day 2007. The episode combined the elements of Top Gear, with that of BBC music chart show Top of the Pops, the latter of which was cancelled by the BBC in 2006. In the episode, presenters Jeremy Clarkson, Richard Hammond and James May hosted their own version of the chart show in their studio at Dunsfold, including discussions about music-related news topics, and performed as a band for the final number alongside Justin Hawkins.

The programme was produced as a replacement for A Question of Comedy, a one-off special edition of sports quiz A Question of Sport that had been recorded some months earlier for Comic Relief but was withdrawn due to Jade Goody being involved as one of its contestants. The decision came after it was felt to be inappropriate to show it following the racism controversy that emerged after her participation on Celebrity Big Brother 5.

== Performances ==
- Lethal Bizzle – "Mr."

The performance was deliberately cut short by Clarkson who literally pulled the plug on him, before labelling it as 'just noise' and referring to him as "Jizzy Tissue" throughout the rest of the show.

- Travis – "Closer"

The band performed three times during filming to make sure everything was perfect, and was incident-free, with the song the only one to be taken seriously and Clarkson declaring it should be the "kind of thing that should be on TOTP".

- Supergrass and Adrian Edmondson – "Richard III"

The band were assisted on guitar by comedian Adrian Edmondson, but had to put up with the hosts supplying bizarre "special effects" to "glam" up the song; Clarkson administered excessive dry ice artificial fog, May threw live 'Bonnie Tyler doves' (chickens) in front of and on the stage, and Hammond used a wind machine to finish things. The strong winds from the machine cause Edmondson to be blown off his feet and nearly to fall off the stage.

Note: The hosts pointed out that Danny Goffey's father, Chris Goffey, used to present the show.

- McFly – "Sofa Hyundai Administration (Top Gear Blues)"

As part of a challenge set by the hosts, the band were challenged by the hosts to write a song which had to contains the words "Sofa", "Administration" and "Hyundai" but could not include "Love", "Baby" and "Heart", and then perform what they wrote. The song was written during production of the episode, and was performed towards the end of the show, using a basic 12-bar blues pattern.

Note: The song produced by the band was included on their single "The Heart Never Lies", following the broadcast of the special.

- Justin Hawkins – "Red Light Spells Danger"

The hosts performed as the "Top Gear band" Despite none of the presenters being professional musicians; all three have musical talent – May has a degree in music, and is a pianist and flautist, while Hammond and Clarkson play bass and drums respectively. The band consisted of May on keyboard, Hammond on bass guitar, and Clarkson drums, with additional support from a backing guitarist, a keyboard player and three backing vocalists, with the band accompanying The Darkness front man Justin Hawkins, who had been on Top Gear as a guest and who sang the song to end the episode.

== Criticism ==
A number of complaints were made by viewers, directed towards James May's actions during Supergrass' performance in which he threw live birds. Viewers were concerned in their complaints that the welfare of the birds had not been considered by the show.

== Reception ==
In an article of The Guardian that covered the reception of Red Nose Day 2007 with viewers, Top Gear of the Pops obtained viewing figures of 6.1 million its timeslot of 22:00-22:30. The figures made it the most watched show of its timeslot, with it attracting a 28% audience share.
