= The Heart Never Lies =

2007 single by McFly

Single by McFly

from the album All the Greatest Hits
- B-side: "Umbrella"; "Ignorance"; "Sofa Hyundai Administration"
- Released: 22 October 2007
- Length: 4:56 (album version); 3:28 (radio edit)
- Label: Island
- Songwriters: Tom Fletcher; Danny Jones
- Producers: Jason Perry; Julian Emery

McFly singles chronology
"Baby's Coming Back" / "Transylvania" (2007)	"The Heart Never Lies" (2007)	"One for the Radio" (2008)

"The Heart Never Lies" is a song by British pop rock band McFly. It was released on 22 October 2007 as a part of the band's All the Greatest Hits album. The song was later included on the original Mail on Sunday pressing of their fourth studio album Radio:Active (2008).

The song debuted at number three on the UK Singles Chart, being beaten by Take That's "Rule the World"' which charted at number two, and Leona Lewis' "Bleeding Love", which debuted at number one. Although "The Heart Never Lies" debuted at number three, it sold 9,000 more copies than their last number one hit "Baby's Coming Back" did in its first week (40,000 against 31,000). "The Heart Never Lies" also reached number sixteen in Ireland.

== Exclusives ==
"The Heart Never Lies" was played for the first time at V Festival on 18 August 2007. The band also performed the song at the Blackpool Illuminations on 31 August 2007. The performance was different from the one at V however, as lead singer Tom Fletcher, couldn't make it to the show, leaving Danny Jones to sing the song alone. BBC Radio 1 were the first radio station to play "The Heart Never Lies". McFly themselves the song in to Scott Mills on 11 September 2007. McFly performed the song on Ant & Dec's Saturday Night Takeaway on 15 September 2007. This was the first TV performance of the single.

In McFly's My Life in Music interview, Fletcher stated that the song was actually inspired by the band and that over time, it evolved into a love song. During live performances, the song eventually became famous for the line "Another year over and we're still together, it's not always easy but I'm here forever" being changed to "It's not always easy but McFly's here forever". The band often perform the song as part of their encore.

== Music video ==
A bulletin was sent to friends of McFly's Myspace page on 8 September 2007 announcing that they had shot the video to the single in Bath. The video was released onto music channels on 21 September 2007. The video sees the band performing in the rain, with shots to a tragic love story which ends with the couple driving straight into water. The official website sees that it has "got to be up there with the best videos McFly have ever made", and has been quoted as completely different from the band's past music videos. The guy that drowns in the car is played by Tom Graham who also played Tom Archer in the long-running BBC Radio 4 show The Archers, with his girlfriend being played by BAFTA-winning actress Vanessa Kirby, best known for playing Princess Margaret in The Crown.

== Track listings ==
UK CD1

1. "The Heart Never Lies"
2. "Umbrella"

UK CD2

1. "The Heart Never Lies"
2. "Ignorance"
3. "Interview" (Part 1)
4. "Sofa Hyundai Administration"
5. "The Heart Never Lies" (video)

UK 7-inch picture disc

1. "The Heart Never Lies"
2. "The Heart Never Lies" (radio edit)
- Part 2 of the interview could be heard by following a link from the CD-ROM to the band's website and entering a unique code found on the CD-ROM.

== Charts ==
=== Weekly charts ===
Chart (2007)	Peak position
Europe (Eurochart Hot 100)	12
Ireland (IRMA)	16
Scotland Singles (OCC)	3
UK Singles (OCC)	3
UK Singles Downloads (OCC)	9

=== Year-end charts ===
Chart (2007)	Position
UK Singles (OCC)	118

== Certifications ==
Region	Certification	Certified units/sales
United Kingdom (BPI)	Silver	200,000^{‡}
^{‡} Sales+streaming figures based on certification alone.
