= Radio:Active =

Radio:ACTIVE
- Standard artwork

Studio album by McFly
- Released: 22 September 2008
- Recorded: 2008, Studios 301, Australia
- Genre: Pop punk; pop rock
- Length: 36:19 (Mail on Sunday); 48:09 (deluxe); 59:12 (Woolworths Deluxe)
- Label: Super / EMI Brazil / Avex Trax (Japan) / EMI International
- Producer: Jason Perry, Danny Jones

McFly chronology
Motion in the Ocean (2006)	Radio:ACTIVE (2008)	Above the Noise (2010)

Singles from Radio:Active
- 1. "One for the Radio" Released: 9 July 2008; 2. "Lies" Released: 15 September 2008; 3. "Do Ya/Stay With Me" Released: 24 November 2008; 4. "Falling in Love" Released: 10 May 2009

Professional ratings
Review scores
Source	Rating
AllMusic	3.5/5 stars
The Guardian	3/5 stars
Sunday Times	2/5 stars

Radio:Active (stylised as Radio:ACTIVE) is the fourth studio album by English pop rock band McFly. It is the band's first album under their new, self-created label, Super Records. The album was first released via a promotion with the Mail on Sunday on 20 July 2008. The album was officially released on 22 September 2008, with the official release being branded the 'Deluxe Edition'.

Since its release, Radio:Active has sold over 500,000 copies worldwide. It has also received a Gold sales status certification for sales of over 100,000 copies in the UK.

== Background ==
McFly made the decision to first issue the album free with the Mail on Sunday. More than 2.4 million copies of the album were given away free, which represented a 300,000 copy increase from the paper's average circulation. Tom Fletcher revealed the strategy: "We get to put it into almost three million homes, which is an incredible opportunity for us. Hopefully the three million people will all enjoy the music and they'll decide to see us when we go on tour." Mail on Sunday managing director Stephen Miron said both "the band and the paper were very happy with the sale". The album was officially released in shops on 22 September 2008. Compared to The Mail on Sunday version, this version contained four extra tracks (including new single "Lies"), but removes the single "The Heart Never Lies". This edition also includes a bonus DVD and a 32-page booklet.

On 29 September 2008, British chain Woolworths issued an exclusive version with three bonus acoustic tracks. On 8 December 2008, a single disc version of the album was released, removing the bonus DVD and the song lyrics in the booklet. At this point, the 'deluxe version' was discontinued. In Japan, the album was available with three different covers, as way of an incentive to collect all three editions. Each edition also contained a different bonus track or DVD feature.

== Song information ==
Fletcher explained each track in a track-by-track interview.

== Singles ==
- "One for the Radio" was released as the album's official lead single. "One for the Radio" received a platinum sales status certification for sales of over 100,000 in Brazil.
- "Lies" was released as the album's second single, despite only appearing the deluxe edition of Radio:Active.
- The double A-side "Do Ya / Stay With Me" was released as the album's third single on 23 November 2008. The single was also the official Children in Need single for 2008.
- "Falling in Love" was released as a promotional single in promotion of the group's Radio:Active DVD.

== Track listing ==
Radio:Active — Standard edition
No.	Title	Writer(s)	Length
1.	"Lies"	Tom Fletcher • Danny Jones • Dougie Poynter	3:45
2.	"One for the Radio"	Fletcher	3:06
3.	"Everybody Knows"	Fletcher • Jones • James Bourne	3:15
4.	"Do Ya"	Fletcher • Jones • Bourne	2:54
5.	"Falling in Love"	Jones	4:29
6.	"POV"	Fletcher	3:55
7.	"Corrupted"	Fletcher • Lauren Christy • Graham Edwards • Scott Spock • Gary Clark	3:41
8.	"Smile"	Fletcher	3:17
9.	"The End"	Fletcher • Christy • Edwards • Spock • Clark	3:44
10.	"Going Through the Motions"	Jones • Poynter	3:23
11.	"Down Goes Another One"	Jones • Poynter • Fletcher	4:17
12.	"Only the Strong Survive"	Fletcher	3:35
13.	"The Last Song"	Fletcher • Jones •	4:48

Radio:Active — Promo edition
No.	Title	Writer(s)	Length
1.	"Do Ya"	Fletcher • Jones • Poynter • Bourne	2:54
2.	"Falling in Love"	Fletcher • Jones • Perry	4:29
3.	"Everybody Knows"	Fletcher • Jones • Poynter • Bourne	3:15
4.	"Smile"	Fletcher	3:17
5.	"One for the Radio"	Fletcher	3:06
6.	"POV"	Fletcher	3:55
7.	"Corrupted"	Fletcher • Christy • Edwards • Spock • Clark	3:41
8.	"The Heart Never Lies"	Fletcher	3:26
9.	"Going Through the Motions"	Fletcher • Jones • Poynter	3:23
10.	"The Last Song"	Fletcher • Jones • Poynter	4:48

Radio:Active — Woolworths edition
No.	Title	Writer(s)	Length
14.	"Do Ya" (acoustic)	Fletcher • Jones • Poynter • Bourne	2:56
15.	"Falling in Love" (acoustic)	Fletcher • Jones • Perry	4:09
16.	"POV" (acoustic)	Fletcher	3:56

Radio:Active — Green Japanese edition bonus track
No.	Title	Writer(s)	Length
14.	"Falling in Love" (acoustic)	Fletcher • Jones • Perry	4:09

Radio:Active — Pink Japanese edition bonus tracks
No.	Title	Writer(s)	Length
14.	"Do Ya" (acoustic)	Fletcher • Jones • Poynter • Bourne	2:56
15.	"POV" (acoustic)	Fletcher	3:56
16.	"Going Through the Motions" (live)	Fletcher • Jones • Poynter	3:22

Radio:Active — Blue Japanese edition bonus track
No.	Title	Writer(s)	Length
14.	"Stay With Me"	Rod Stewart • Ronnie Wood	4:27

Radio:Active — Townsend Records bonus downloads
No.	Title	Writer(s)	Length
14.	"Lies" (Johnny Phonett remix)	Fletcher • Jones • Poynter	5:19
15.	"Lies" (Johnny Phonett dub)	Fletcher • Jones • Poynter	6:41

Radio:Active — Deluxe edition bonus DVD
No.	Title	Length
1.	"Down Under with McFly – The Making of Radio:Active"	1:00:00
2.	"Promoting Radio:ACTIVE – On the Road with McFly"	1:00:00

Radio:Active — Blue Japanese edition bonus DVD
No.	Title	Length
1.	"Lies" (music video)	3:44
2.	"One for the Radio" (music video)	3:06
3.	"Do Ya" (music video)	2:54
4.	"Lies" (Making of the video)	5:30
5.	"Promoting Radio:Active – On the Road with McFly" (Japanese edit)	1:00:00

Radio:Active — Pink Japanese edition bonus DVD
No.	Title	Length
1.	"Lies" (music video)	3:44
2.	"One for the Radio" (music video)	3:06
3.	"Do Ya" (music video)	2:54
4.	"McFly in Brazil" (documentary)	30:00
5.	"Promoting Radio:Active – On the Road with McFly" (Japanese edit)	1:00:00
6.	"McFly's Message to the Fans"	2:30

== Personnel ==
- Danny Jones – lead guitar, lead vocals, executive producer
- Tom Fletcher – rhythm guitar, lead vocals, piano, keyboard
- Harry Judd – drums, percussion
- Dougie Poynter – bass, backing vocals
- Jamie Norton – keyboard
- Jason Perry – guitar, backing vocals, producer, executive producer
- Tom Lord-Alge – mixer

== Tour ==
- See also: Radio:Active Live at Wembley

The fifteen date Radio:ACTIVE tour took place throughout November 2008. A live concert DVD was filmed at Wembley Arena on 27 November 2008 and released on 11 May 2009.

- Tour Dates
1. 7 November – Sheffield Arena
2. 8 November – Newcastle Metro Radio Arena
3. 10 November – Belfast Odyssey
4. 11 November – Dublin RDS
5. 14 November – Birmingham NEC
6. 15 November – Bournemouth International Centre
7. 16 November – Plymouth Pavilions
8. 18 November – Brighton Centre
9. 19 November – Cardiff International Centre
10. 21 November – Nottingham Arena
11. 22 November – Manchester Arena
12. 24 November – Aberdeen AECC
13. 25 November – Glasgow SECC
14. 27 November – London Wembley Arena
15. 29 November – Liverpool Echo Arena
- Setlist
1. "One for the Radio"
2. "Everybody Knows"
3. "Going Through The Motions"
4. "Obviously"
5. "Transylvania"
6. "Corrupted"
7. "POV"
8. "Falling in Love"
9. "Star Girl"
10. "That Girl"
11. "Do Ya"
12. "Black Or White"
13. "Room on the 3rd Floor"
14. "All About You"
15. "The Last Song"
16. "Lies"
17. "Five Colours in Her Hair"

== Charts and certifications ==
=== Charts ===
Chart (2008)	Peak position
European Albums Chart	34
Irish Albums (IRMA)	20
Japanese Albums (Oricon)	49
Japanese International Albums (Oricon)	15
Scottish Albums (OCC)	9
UK Albums (OCC)	8
UK Album Downloads (OCC)	25

=== Certifications ===
Region	Certification	Certified units/sales
United Kingdom (BPI)	Gold	100,000^{‡}
^{‡} Sales+streaming figures based on certification alone.

== Release history ==
Region	Date	Label	Format
United Kingdom	22 September 2008	Super Records	DVD, CD, digital download
Ireland	22 September 2008	Super Records	DVD, CD, digital download
Brazil	27 October 2008	EMI Music	DVD, CD, digital download
Japan	11 February 2009	Avex Trax	DVD, CD, digital download
Mexico	18 May 2009	EMI Music	DVD, CD, digital download
Argentina	18 May 2009	EMI Music	DVD, CD, digital download
Colombia	18 May 2009	EMI Music	DVD, CD, digital download
Latin America	26 May 2009	EMI Music	DVD, CD, digital download
Singapore	12 June 2009	Warner Music	DVD, CD, digital download
Philippines	November 2009	Warner Music	DVD, CD, digital download
Spain	1 December 2009	EMI Music Spain	DVD, CD, digital download
