= Above the Noise =

2010 studio album by McFly

Studio album by McFly
- Released: 15 November 2010
- Recorded: 2009–2010
- Studios: DARP, Atlanta, Georgia; ICP, Brussels, Belgium; EMI Music Publishing
- Genres: Pop; dance-pop
- Length: 42:12
- Label: Universal Island
- Producers: Dallas Austin; Alan Nglish; Taio Cruz

McFly chronology
Radio:Active (2008)	Above the Noise (2010)	Memory Lane: The Best of McFly (2012)

Singles from Above the Noise
- 1. "Party Girl" Released: 6 September 2010; 2. "Shine a Light" Released: 7 November 2010; 3. "That's the Truth" Released: 7 March 2011

Above the Noise is the fifth studio album from English pop rock band McFly. The album was released on 15 November 2010. The album spawned three singles: "Party Girl", which was released on 6 September; "Shine a Light", which was released on 8 November; and "That's the Truth", which was released on 6 March 2011.

The album's title, taken from a line in "Shine a Light", was revealed when it was made available to pre-order from the HMV website. The band made the album available to download to members of their new official website, SuperCity. The band worked with producers Dallas Austin and Taio Cruz on the album, which saw them return to their former record label, Island Records. The album's track listing was revealed on 25 October 2010. The album was certified as Gold in the UK. The album was released concurrently with the DVD Behind the Noise, which was exclusive to Asda, which contained behind-the-scenes footage from the album in addition to two music videos.

== Background ==
After the release of "Falling in Love", McFly headed back into the studio to begin work on their next album. On 22 January 2010, it was announced that the band were going to re-sign with former label Island Records. This was later revealed to be a 50/50 deal that sees all profits except publishing split between Universal and McFly, including money from touring, record sales, merchandise and sponsorship. The band began writing with producer Dallas Austin in April 2010. The album's title comes from a line in the second verse of the single "Shine a Light": "Tell me can you hear my voice, loud and clear above the noise?"

Above the Noise was executive produced by Dallas Austin, who personally produced nearly all of the songs, bar "Shine a Light" and "Nowhere Left to Run". Rick Sheppard handled recording, with assistant recording engineers Andrew Nitsch and Ian Rossiter at DARP Studios & Home Recordings. "Shine a Light" and "Nowhere Left to Run" were produced by Taio Curz and Alan Nglish, with engineer John Hanes and assistant Tim Roberts. Jason Perry did instrument production across "Party Girl", "Nowhere Left to Run" and "That's the Truth" at ICP Recording Studios in Brssels, Belgium. Adam Noble did engineering on "Party Girl" and "Nowhere Left to Run", the latter also had engineering from Scott McCormick and Ben Jackson, with assistant Jack Tarrant, at EMI Music Publishing Studios. Robert Orton mixed almost every track, save for "Shine a Light", which was done by Serban Ghenea at MixStar Studios in Virginia Beach, Virginia. Tim Young then mastered the album at Metropolis Mastering.

== Singles ==
On 9 July 2010, Tom Fletcher and Dougie Poynter confirmed on Twitter that the first single from the album would be called "Party Girl", a track which was written in Atlanta with Austin. According to Austin, "Party Girl" is the only track on the album with a heavily dance-oriented sound. The song premiered on 14 July 2010 on BBC Radio 1, and a one-minute-long snippet was posted on McFly's Myspace page. On the same day, InDemand played the full song. The single was released on 6 September 2010, peaking at number six on the UK Singles Chart.

The second single from the album, "Shine a Light", is a track produced and jointly written with Taio Cruz, who also features on the track. The song premiered on 21 September 2010, following a video treasure hunt competition involving the band. The treasure hunt allowed fans to appear in the music video for the track by hunting for clues to get to the place of filming. The single was released on 8 November 2010.

On 7 January, Tom and Dougie announced in a video message via SuperCity that "That's the Truth" would be the next single from the album, and it would be released on 6 March. A video for the song was recorded and live recording footage was broadcast through SuperCity. The video deals with Dougie Poynter's admission to rehab following his split with Frankie Sandford. This also resulted in three dates of the group's tour being rescheduled.

== Critical reception ==
Professional ratings
Review scores
Source	Rating
AllMusic	3.5/5 stars
BBC	favourable
Entertainment-Focus	positive
Funky.com	3/5 stars
Music News Daily	2.5/5 stars
NME	5/10
OK!	4/5 stars
The Scotsman	positive
Virgin Media	2/5 stars

The album received generally favourable reviews from music critics. Jon O'Brien from AllMusic rated it 3.5 stars out of 5 and positively noted that "Above the Noise is McFly's most consistently strong collection of songs in their six-year career. Whether it will be enough to prevent their worrying sales decline remains to be seen, but by embracing their pop sensibilities, they've at least given themselves a fighting chance of competing with their contemporaries". Iain Moffaft from the BBC gave a positive review for the album, saying the album was "the most radical break we can remember at this stage of a band's career since Everything but the Girl's jaunt into jungle, and one that confirms that McFly are not only conclusively back, but they might just have guaranteed themselves a future". OK! Magazine were also positive in their review, saying that "anyone who's anyone in pop is going all 80s these days. Guitars are so yesterday, grandad and retro synths are where it's at! Even McFly – famous for their playschool punk-pop sound – have done it. And while it would be easy to accuse them of jumping on bandwagons to make a pile of cash, we're pleased because this is the best thing they've done."

Entertainment Focus were also positive in their review saying that "Above the Noise is the best record that McFly have released in the 6 years they've been together. Finally maturing musically and moving away from the teen pop of previous releases, the band embrace pop sensibilities to create the strongest collection of songs they've ever recorded. Above the Noise should be a huge seller as we approach Christmas and don't be surprised if it spawns several hit singles". Emma Dawson from M is for Music gave a mixed review, calling it a "embarrassing and average album", stating, "Above the Noise may be a welcome change and will certainly help them back on their feet after Radio:Active, however I'd much rather go and listen to Room on the Third Floor and Wonderland to remind me of the pop band they once were, and what I secretly wish they still were." Hamish MacBain from the NME, while admiring the band's commercial endurance, dismissed the music as "absolute shite". David Pollock from The Scotsman positively noted that the album is "undoubtedly their best studio effort yet, but still aimed squarely at those who like their pop glossy and unchallenging". Johnny Dee from Virgin Media concluded that "Above the Noise is a stab at a mature pop sound which sometimes results in a bonkers Duran Duran meets Muse mish-mash complete with War of the Worlds rock opera climax".

In 2023, McFly drummer Harry Judd reflected on the album. "Some people love some of the songs on Above the Noise," he told Gigwise. "[A]nd there's some songs on that album that I really love, but ...I think it just sent us on this kind of confusing path of shit, who are we?"

== Chart performance ==
In UK, Above the Noise debuted at number 20 with sales of 17,662 sales in the first week, and by the end of the year was certified Silver, with sales of over 60,000. Since its release the album has sold over 100,000 copies so far in the UK. It fared better on the UK Albums Download Chart, peaking at number 7. In Scotland it peaked at number 20, and at number 79 in Ireland. In Spain, Above the Noise marks the first time an album of McFly's has peaked higher than in the UK; it peaked at number 15.

== Track listing ==
Above the Noise track listing
No.	Title	Writer(s)	Producer(s)	Length
1.	"End of the World"	Tom Fletcher; Danny Jones; Dougie Poynter; Dallas Austin; Jeff Wayne	Austin	4:02
2.	"Party Girl"	Austin; Fletcher; Jones; Poynter	Austin	3:11
3.	"iF U C Kate"	Austin; JC Chasez	Austin	3:38
4.	"Shine a Light" (featuring Taio Cruz)	Fletcher; Jones; Cruz	Nglish	3:39
5.	"I'll Be Your Man"	Fletcher; Jones; Austin	Austin	4:15
6.	"Nowhere Left to Run"	Fletcher; Jones; Poynter; Cruz	Nglish; Cruz	3:23
7.	"I Need a Woman"	Fletcher; Jones; Poynter	Austin	3:59
8.	"That's the Truth"	Austin; Jones; Fletcher; Harry Judd; Poynter	Austin	3:52
9.	"Take Me There"	Austin; Jones; Fletcher; Judd; Poynter	Austin	3:43
10.	"This Song"	Fletcher; Jones	Austin	4:07
11.	"Foolish"	Austin; Naz Tokio; Fletcher; Jones	Austin	4:24

ASDA bonus DVD: Behind the Noise
No.	Title	Length
1.	"Behind the Noise" (Documentary)	30:00
2.	"Party Girl" (video)	4:08
3.	"Shine a Light" (video)	3:45

Japanese edition
No.	Title	Writer(s)	Producer(s)	Length
12.	"Sunny Side of the Street"	Tom Fletcher	Tom Fletcher	3:14
13.	"Hotel on a Hill"	Tom Fletcher	Tom Fletcher	1:29
14.	"I'll Be Your Man" (Acoustic)	Tom Fletcher, Danny Jones, Dallas Austin	Dallas Austin	4:42

=== Notes ===
- "I Need a Woman" samples "My Girl", recorded by The Temptations and written by Smokey Robinson and Ronald White, and includes a riff from "Supreme", recorded by Robbie Williams and written by Williams and Guy Chambers.
- "End of the World" samples "War of the Worlds", written and recorded by Jeff Wayne.
- "iF U C Kate" has been abbreviated to 'Kate' on the Japanese version of the album, possibly due to the suggestiveness of the title.
- The album also includes the solo version of "Shine a Light".

== Personnel ==
Personnel per booklet.

McFly

- Tom Fletcher – lead vocals, backing vocals, guitars
- Danny Jones – lead vocals, backing vocals, guitars
- Dougie Poynter – backing vocals, bass guitar
- Harry Judd – drums

Additional musicians

- Dallas Austin – keyboard (all except tracks 4 and 6)
- Mike Hartnett – bass guitar (track 3), drums (track 3)
- Tony Reyes – additional guitar (track 3)
- Taio Cruz – programming (track 4), keyboards (track 4)
- Alan Nglish – programming (track 4), keyboards (track 4), synths (track 6), bass (track 6), programmed drums (track 6), guitars (track 6)
- Colin Munroe – guitar (track 11), tambourine (track 11)
- Rick Sheppard – programming (all except tracks 4 and 6)

Production and design

- Rick Sheppard – recording (all except tracks 3, 4 and 6)
- Andrew Nitsch – assistant recording engineer (all except tracks 4 and 6)
- Ian Rossiter – assistant recording engineer (all except tracks 4 and 6)
- John Hanes – engineer (tracks 4 and 6)
- Tim Roberts – assistant (track 4 and 6)
- Dallas Austin – producer (all except tracks 4 and 6), executive producer
- Taio Cruz – producer (track 4), co-producer (track 6)
- Alan Nglish – producer (tracks 4 and 6)
- Jason Perry – addition vocals production (tracks 2 and 6), drum production (tracks 2 and 6), guitars production (tracks 2 and 6), additional drum engineering (track 8)
- Adam Noble – engineer (tracks 2 and 6), additional drum engineering (track 8)
- Danny Jones – additional vocals engineering (track 3)
- Robert Orton – mixing (all except track 4)
- Serban Ghenea – mixing (track 4)
- Scott McCormick – engineer (track 6)
- Ben Jackson – engineer (track 6)
- Jack Tarrant – assistance (track 6)
- Tim Young – mastering
- Nels Israelson – photography
- Stylorouge – design, art direction

== Charts ==
Chart performance for Above the Noise
Chart (2010)	Peak position
European Albums Chart	41
Irish Albums (IRMA)	79
Mexican Albums (AMPROFON)	100
Scottish Albums (Official Charts)	20
South Korea Albums (GAON)	17
Spanish Albums (PROMUSICAE)	15
UK Albums (Official Charts)	20

== Certifications ==
Certifications for Above the Noise
Region	Certification	Certified units/sales
United Kingdom (BPI)	Gold	100,000^{^}
^{^} Shipments figures based on certification alone.

== Release history ==
Release history and formats for Above the Noise
Region	Date	Label	Format
Ireland	12 November 2010	Island	CD, digital download
United Kingdom (+ 'Behind The Noise')	15 November 2010	Island	CD, digital download
Europe	15 November 2010	Island	CD, digital download
Spain	16 November 2010	Island	CD, digital download
Portugal	16 November 2010	Island	CD, digital download
Germany	18 November 2010	Island	CD, digital download
Mexico	22 November 2010	Island	CD, digital download
Brazil	30 November 2010	Island	CD, digital download
Australia	10 December 2010	Island	CD, digital download
Japan	20 March 2011	Island	CD, digital download
United States	5 April 2011	Island	CD, digital download
