= Party Girl (McFly song) =

2010 single by McFly

Single by McFly

from the album Above the Noise
- Released: 6 September 2010
- Recorded: 2010
- Genre: Electropop; dance punk; pop
- Length: 3:15 (album version); 3:11 (radio edit)
- Label: Island
- Songwriters: Tom Fletcher; Danny Jones; Dallas Austin; Dougie Poynter
- Producer: Dallas Austin

McFly singles chronology
"Falling in Love" (2009)	"Party Girl" (2010)	"Shine a Light" (2010)

"Party Girl" is a song by British pop rock band McFly. It was released as the lead single from their fifth studio album, Above the Noise (2010). The song premiered on UK radio on 14 July 2010 on In:Demand, and was released on 5 September 2010, where it debuted at number 6 on the UK Singles Chart; marking the band's sixteenth Top 10 single to date.

On 25 August 2010 the song was added to BBC Radio 1's A-List. "Party Girl" was played on the TV Series Pretty Little Liars.

== Background ==
After the release of "Falling in Love", McFly headed back into the studio. On 22 January 2010, it was announced that the band were going to re-sign with former label Island Records. This was later revealed to be a 50/50 deal that sees all profits, except publishing, split between Universal and McFly, including money from touring, record sales, merchandise and sponsorship. The band worked with producer Dallas Austin on this, their fifth studio album.

On 9 July 2010, Fletcher and Poynter confirmed on Twitter that the first single from the album would be called "Party Girl", which was written in Atlanta with Austin. According to Austin, "Party Girl" is the only track on the album with a heavily dance-oriented sound. The song premièred on 14 July on Radio 1 and a one-minute-long clip was posted on McFly's Myspace page. On the same day, In:Demand played the full song. McFly have been on the top 20 in popstars' opinions of the best UK artist. "Party Girl" was played by The Wanted and Olly Murs. McFly have promoted "Party Girl" by playing it live on GMTV, KFC Crushems, This Morning, Suck My Pop, Big Brother's Little Brother and Magic Numbers.

== Track listing ==
UK CD1

1. "Party Girl" - 3:14
2. "Sunny Side of the Street" (Home Demo) - 3:14

UK CD2

1. "Party Girl" - 3:14
2. "Hotel on a Hill" - 1:30
3. "Party Girl" (Danny Jones Remix) - 3:54
4. "Party Girl" (Doman & Gooding Remix) - 5:28

UK 7" Picture Disc

1. "Party Girl" - 3:14

== Music video ==
The music video for Party Girl premiered on MSN on 19 August. The video contains clips from McFly's upcoming 40-minute-long vampire-minifilm "Nowhere Left To Run". The sixteenth century manor house featured in a number of scenes is Bruce Castle Museum in Tottenham, London; the church is the 14th century All Hallows Parish Church, just to the north of Bruce Castle. The video also contained several scenes where McFly performs the song, separately from the rest of the video. They won an award for this video : 4Music Video Honours - Best Video of 2010.

== Critical reception ==
Teen website 'Teen Today' said the song was "amazing". Alex and Lucy of radio station In:Demand said the song had an electro feel to it but still a good rocking McFly tune, also the song sounded a cross between 3OH!3 and Enrique Iglesias. Nick Levine of Digital Spy gave the single a rating of five out of five stars, calling it "an unstoppable post-GaGa dance-pop stomper built on a deliciously fizzy mix of synths and guitar riffs", and felt that "the whopping great 'woah woah' chorus is as hard to resist as an apple pie left to cool by an open window".

== Chart performance ==
"Party Girl" debuted on the Irish Singles Chart on 10 September 2010 at number 31. On 12 September, the single debuted on the UK Single Chart at number 6, with sales of more than 40,000 copies. On its second week, the single fell 7 places to number 13, meaning it only spent a single week within the Top 10. The single then continued to plummet, falling a huge 19 places to number 32 on 30 September 2010. "Party Girl" fell out of the Top 40 the following week, meaning it spent only 3 weeks within. The single also debuted at number 6 on the Scottish Singles and Albums Chart.

== Charts ==
=== Weekly charts ===
Chart (2010)	Peak position
Eurochart Hot 100 Singles	20
Ireland (IRMA)	31
Scottish Singles Sales (Official Charts)	6
UK Singles (Official Charts)	6
UK Airplay (Music Week)	20

=== Year-end charts ===
Chart (2010)	Position
UK Singles Chart	193

== Release history ==
Region	Date	Label	Format
Ireland	2 September 2010	Island Records	Digital Download, CD
United Kingdom	5 September 2010	Island Records	CD, Digital download, 7"
Spain	5 September 2010	Universal Music	Digital download

== In popular culture ==
The song appears in Episode 18, Series 1 of US teen drama Pretty Little Liars when the girls are attending a college frat party.
