= Falling in Love (McFly song) =

Single by McFly

from the album Radio:Active
- Released: 10 May 2009
- Genre: Pop rock
- Length: 3:31 (radio edit); 4:29 (album version)
- Label: Super, EMI
- Songwriters: Danny Jones, Tom Fletcher, Jason Perry
- Producer: Jason Perry

McFly singles chronology
"Do Ya" / "Stay with Me" (2008)	"Falling in Love" (2009)	"Party Girl" (2010)

"Falling in Love" is the fourth and final single taken from British pop rock band McFly's fourth studio album, Radio:Active. On 29 April 2009, the song was added to BBC Radio 1's C-List and BBC Radio 2's B-List. In the UK, "Falling in Love" was released to promote the Radio:Active DVD. In Brazil, the song was released officially on 7 May. An iTunes bundle, consisting of the Radio Edit and Music Video, was released on 10 May 2009. The video for the track consists of clips from the group's Radio:Active Live at Wembley DVD. The intro has a small resemblance to The Byrds' song "I'll Feel a Whole Lot Better".

== Track listing ==
iTunes download bundle

1. "Falling in Love" (radio edit) – 3:31
2. "Falling in Love" (video) – 3:40

== Release history ==
Region	Date	Label	Format
Brazil	7 May 2009	EMI Music Brazil	Digital Download, Airplay
United Kingdom	4 April 2009	Super Records	Digital Download, Promotional Single
International	10 May 2009	Super Records	Digital Download
Spain	12 December 2009	EMI Music Spain	Radio Airplay

== Chart performance ==
Chart (2009)	Position
Spain Airplay (Los 40 Principales)	23
UK Singles (OCC)	87

== Live Performances ==
Brazil

- Domingão do Faustão October 2008
- Altas Horas – October 2008
- Radio:Active Tour – October 2008
- Up Close...And This Time It's Personal Tour – May 2009
- Domingão do Faustão May 2009

U.K.

- Radio:Active Tour – November 2008
- Tonight’s The Night – April 2009
- Paul O’Grady Show – May 2009
- Hollyoaks – May 2009
- BBC Sound – May 2009
- Up Close...And This Time It's Personal Tour – April/May 2009
- BBC Switch – May 2009
- Radio 1 Chart Show – May 2009

Spain

- Under Eighteen U18 – September 2009
- Sesiones Myspace – December 2009
