= McFly =

British pop/rock band

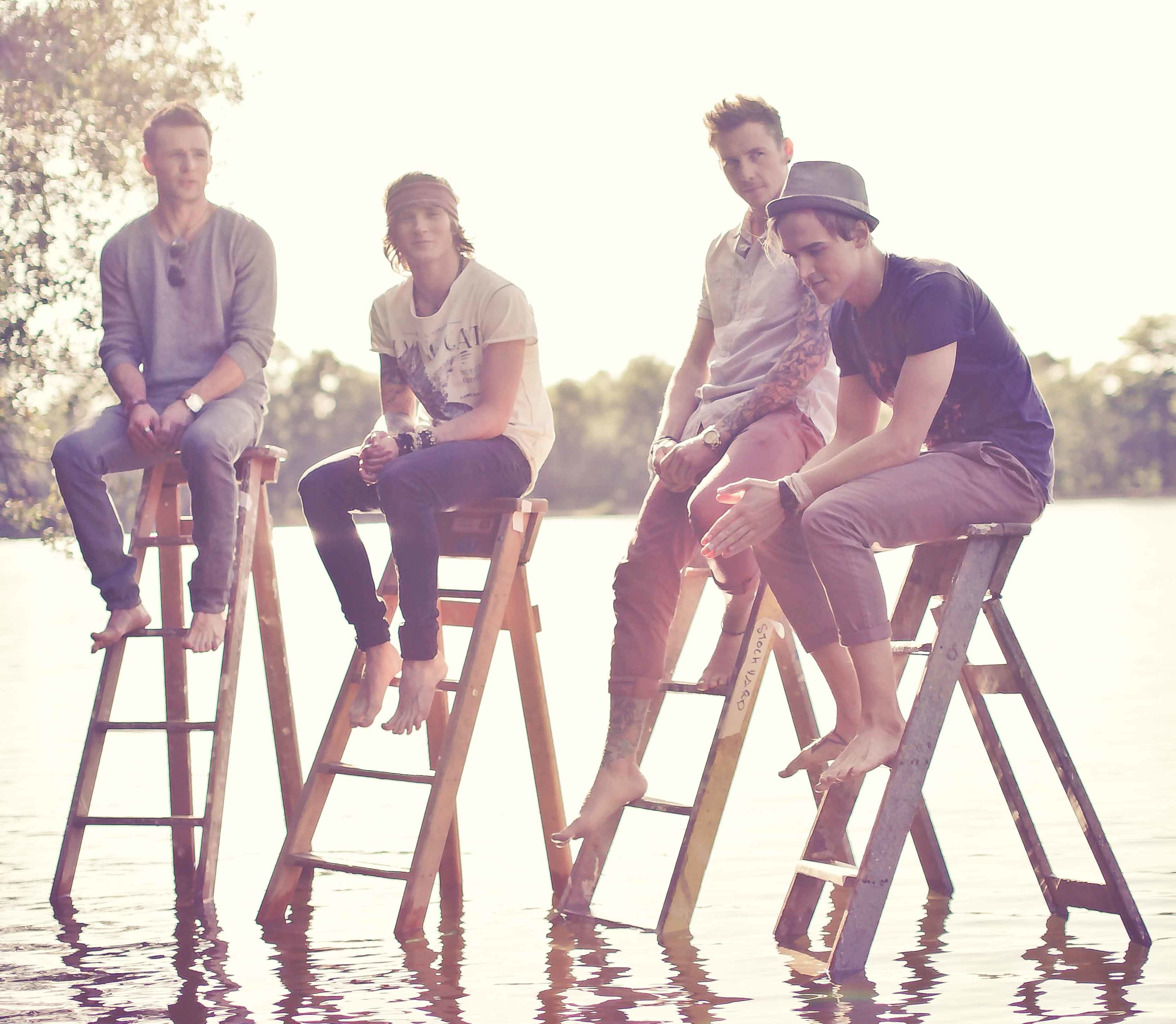
- McFly in 2011. Left to right: Harry Judd, Dougie Poynter, Danny Jones and Tom Fletcher.

Background information
- Origin: London, England
- Genres: Rock; pop rock; pop punk
- Years active: 2003–present
- Labels: Island; Super; BMG
- Spinoffs: McBusted
- Members: Tom Fletcher; Danny Jones; Dougie Poynter; Harry Judd
- Website: mcfly.com

McFly are a British pop rock band formed in London in 2003. The band took their name from the Back to the Future character Marty McFly. The band consists of Tom Fletcher (lead vocals, guitar, and piano), Danny Jones (lead vocals, harmonica, and guitar), Dougie Poynter (bass guitar, vocals) and Harry Judd (drums). They were signed to Island Records from their 2004 launch until December 2007, before creating their own label, Super Records.

McFly rose to fame after fellow band Busted, with whom they later formed McBusted, helped launch them by inviting them to tour in 2004. In 2005, they won the Brit Award for Best British Pop Act. McFly's debut album, Room on the 3rd Floor, debuted at number one on the UK Albums Chart and is certified as double platinum; this led to them taking the record, in the Guinness Book of Records, as being the youngest band ever to have an album debut at number one—a title taken from the Beatles. A month after the album was released, the band had their first UK headlining tour.

The band's second album, Wonderland, which was released in 2005, also charted at number one in the UK making them the youngest band to have topped the UK Albums Chart twice. Their third album, Motion in the Ocean, was released on 6 November 2006 and charted at number 6 in the UK. McFly released their All the Greatest Hits compilation album on 5 November 2007, which charted at number 4 in the UK. The band's fourth studio album, Radio:Active, was given away for free as a supplement in the Mail on Sunday on 20 July 2008, before being released in the conventional manner (via physical release) on 2 September 2008. Their fifth album, Above the Noise, was released in November 2010 and charted at number 20.

In 2013, McFly collaborated with Busted to form the "supergroup" McBusted. They played a 34-date tour with both Busted and McFly songs. The only member of the original groups not to participate in the new line-up was former Busted singer Charlie Simpson. After Simpson's return to Busted in November 2015, McFly made a return and sold out their Anthology Tour in September 2016. After that, the band took an indefinite hiatus, with their Twitter account confirming that the boys were focusing on solo projects in 2018. In January 2019, Poynter confirmed via a podcast that the band would be reforming that year with a new album and tour. In September the band announced a new album of previously unreleased material and a concert at the O2 Arena in November 2019, followed by a 2020 comeback arena tour, which would however be delayed to 2021 due to the COVID-19 pandemic. Their sixth album, Young Dumb Thrills, was released in 2020.

According to the British Phonographic Industry (BPI), McFly has been certified for 2 million albums and 4 million singles in the UK. and more than 10 million records worldwide. As of 2016, McFly have had 18 consecutive UK top 20 singles, seven of which reached number one in the UK Singles Chart and fifteen of which were consecutive top ten singles.

== History ==
=== 2002–2004: Formation and Room on the 3rd Floor ===
In 2001, Tom Fletcher auditioned for Busted, but lost out on the place to Charlie Simpson. Fletcher was originally accepted as part of Busted's line-up, but Island Records went on to reassess the situation and eventually decided to have the band as a three-piece rather than a four-piece. Though the record label decided against offering Fletcher a place in Busted, they were intrigued by his songwriting talents and later offered him a place on Busted's songwriting 'team', alongside band member (and already accomplished songwriter) James Bourne, whom Fletcher credits with helping him to compose melodies.

While writing Busted's second album, A Present for Everyone, Fletcher was asked by the record label if he was available to film auditions for a new band, V. It was at this time that Jones and Fletcher met for the first time; Danny Jones went to the audition mistaking the band to be an instrumental band rather than the conventional, all-singing, all-dancing boyband, for which they were intended. Fletcher was impressed with Jones' unique style and so approached and invited him to write with himself and Bourne. When writing projects for Busted had come to an end, the two began collaborating for their own (yet unnamed) band and, eventually, moved into the InterContinental Hotel in London for two months, (while still receiving help from Bourne) to concentrate on writing together. Bassist Dougie Poynter and drummer Harry Judd were subsequently recruited via a classified advertisement in the NME magazine. The pair, both from Essex, coincidentally turned up at the same audition and discussed their shared appreciation of the band the Starting Line, after Poynter noticed their name and logo was printed on Judd's T-shirt.

McFly's early sound was surf/pop rock. Their debut single, "5 Colours in Her Hair", released 29 March 2004, entered the UK Singles Chart at number 1 in April 2004 and stayed there the following week. In July 2004 their second single, "Obviously", also topped the charts. This was followed by the album Room on the 3rd Floor debuting at number 1 in the UK Albums Chart. It would go on to be certified double platinum by the British Phonographic Industry. The album broke records, as McFly earned an award from Guinness World Records for being the youngest band to have a debut album enter the charts in the top position, a distinction previously held by The Beatles. The idea for the album name came from where Jones and Fletcher wrote most of the songs for the album: room 363 in the InterContinental Hotel in London. The third single, "That Girl", was released on 6 September 2004, placing at number 3. The fourth single, Room on the 3rd Floor, the album's title track, was released on 15 November 2004 and reached number 5. McFly supported Busted on their nationwide arena tour along with V in February 2004 and then had their first headlining tour in September 2004.

=== 2004–2007: Wonderland and Motion in the Ocean ===
In March 2005, McFly released a double A-side of "All About You/You've Got a Friend" from their second album, Wonderland, which featured a 60-piece orchestra. The single reached number 1 for a week on 13 March 2005, with all profits donated to Comic Relief. The video for "You've Got a Friend" was shot in Uganda, Africa, which McFly visited for to raise awareness for the cause. Several months later, on 2 July, McFly co-headlined Live 8 Japan, with Björk and Good Charlotte and also took part in the London concert at Hyde Park. The second single from Wonderland, "I'll Be OK", was released in the UK on 15 August 2005 and scored them their fourth UK number 1. The album itself was released on 29 August 2005 entering at number 1. The third single from Wonderland, "I Wanna Hold You", was released on 17 October 2005 with an unknown song Easy Way Out on the single and it gave them their 6th top 3 single. Their fourth and final single, "Ultraviolet/The Ballad of Paul K" from Wonderland was released on 12 December 2005 and reached number 9. McFly headlined their Wonderland Arena Tour, which started on 15 September 2005, supported by Tyler James and Famous Last Words. A DVD of the tour, recorded live at the MEN Arena in Manchester, was released on 28 November. The band also played at the 2005 Royal Variety Performance. Nemesis, an inverted roller coaster at the Alton Towers theme park was renamed Wonderland for a month in 2005 to celebrate the album's release. The band were filmed riding Nemesis with competition winners by music show CD:UK.

In 2006, McFly turned their attentions to the United States, appearing in the Lindsay Lohan movie Just My Luck, released on 12 May, three days after the soundtrack of the movie, which comprised McFly songs taken from both Room on the 3rd Floor and Wonderland, as well as a new version of "Five Colours in Her Hair". The band played several gigs in Los Angeles and New York, as well as attending the American premiere of Just My Luck in Hollywood.

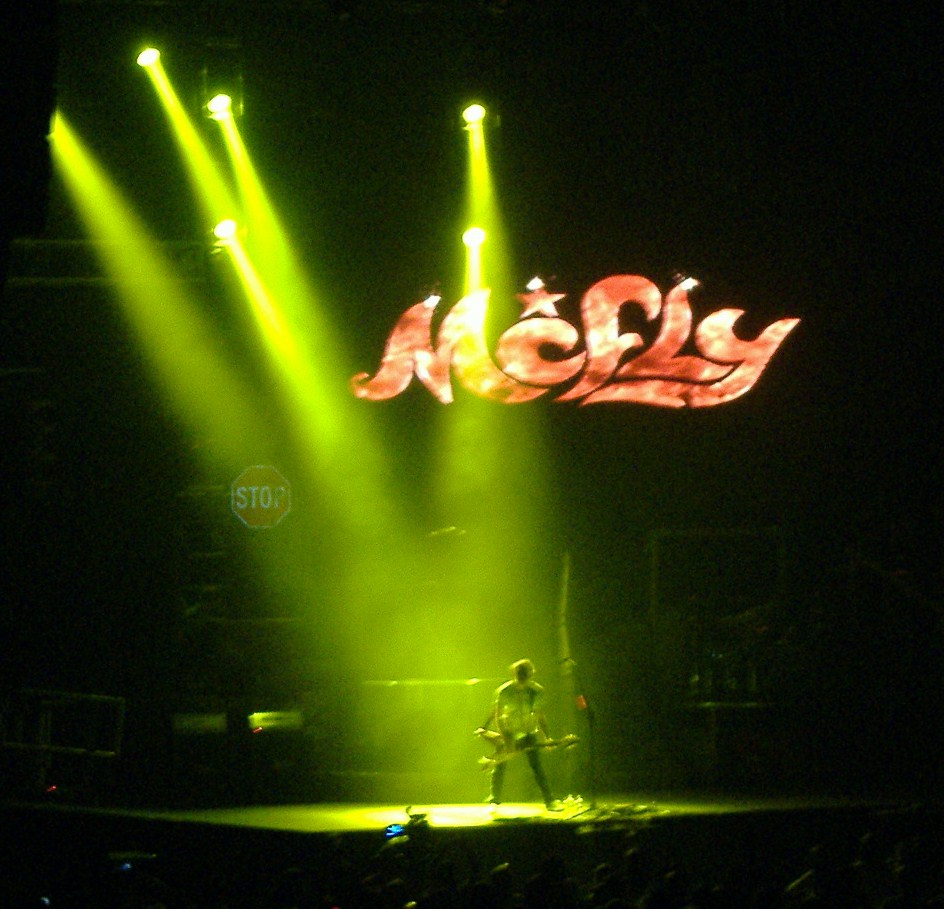
Tom Fletcher of McFly performs onstage at Nottingham Arena during McFly's Motion in the Ocean Tour in 2006.

McFly's first single of 2006 was "Please, Please", released in the UK as a double A-side with a cover of the Queen hit "Don't Stop Me Now" on 17 July as the official song for Sport Relief 2006. It reached number 1 in the UK charts on 23 July, making it the band's fifth number 1 single of their career. On 14 September 2006, it was confirmed via an email newsletter from McFly's official website that the third album would be called Motion in the Ocean. The album was released on 6 November 2006 and reached number 6. The second release from the album, "Star Girl", was released on 23 October 2006, to promote the album. "Star Girl" reached number 1 in its first week. The third release from the album, "Sorry's Not Good Enough/Friday Night", was released on 18 December 2006, and reached number 3 in the UK singles charts. "Friday Night" is featured in the movie Night at the Museum, which was released on 22 December 2006, in Canada and the US and 26 December 2006, in the UK. Their next single, "Baby's Coming Back/Transylvania", was released on 7 May 2007, becoming the band's seventh number 1. The original single release date was due to be 26 February, but the band took up the offer to return at that time to the town of Kamwokya in Uganda, which they previously visited for Comic Relief in 2005. Until 1 January 2016,"Baby's Coming Back/Transylvania" held the record for the biggest fall from number one for a non-limited edition single. It fell from number 1 to number 20 after a week, matching a limited edition Elvis Presley single, "One Night". This record was broken by the 2015 NHS charity single A Bridge Over You; after becoming the Christmas number one on 25 December 2015, the single fell to Number 29 the following week.

McFly held their Motion in the Ocean tour from 17 September 2006 and were supported by The Click Five and Nylon. They also held their McFly Up Close and Personal tour, supported by Lil' Chris, which started on 20 March 2007, and consisted of performing in twenty four locations not covered by their arena tours over thirty four dates. Motion in the Ocean was re-released as a double disc edition with "Baby's Coming Back" and DVD from the Wembley show on 14 May 2007 and reached number 14.

=== 2007–2009: All the Greatest Hits, touring and Radio:Active ===
McFly's All the Greatest Hits compilation album was released on 5 November 2007 and reached number 4 in the charts. The first single from the album, The Heart Never Lies, which reached number 3 in the UK singles chart, was premiered at the V Festival in August. The album also featured two new songs alongside "The Heart Never Lies", "The Way You Make Me Feel" and "Don't Wake Me Up". The band went on a 26-date Greatest Hits tour for a month, starting near the end of November 2007 supported by Elliot Minor and Saving Aimee, to promote the album.

On 23 February and 1 March 2008, they performed two small gigs at the Annandale Hotel in Sydney, Australia while recording Radio:Active. They performed the same set list as for their Greatest Hits tour. It was here where they recorded the crowd singing "we don't care" which was later used on their single "One for the Radio". A compilation album of B-Sides was also released on 3 December 2007, The Greatest Bits: B-Sides & Rarities, which contains 12 B-sides of their UK singles.

On 20 May 2008, McFly confirmed that their fourth studio album would be titled Radio:Active (typeset as Radio:ACTIVE). It was recorded in Australia, and given away for free as a supplement in The Mail on Sunday on 20 July 2008. It was subsequently released in stores on 22 September 2008 with four additional tracks, a DVD and a 32-page booklet. The album was announced after McFly confirmed that they had left Island Records as they were unhappy with some of the decisions that the label was making for them. Since announcing the launch of their new record label, the band have said that they "won't rule out" signing other acts, but that for the moment they're just concentrating on releasing their "own stuff". Radio:Active mixes their love of vintage rock with a British twist on the modern pop-rock sound.

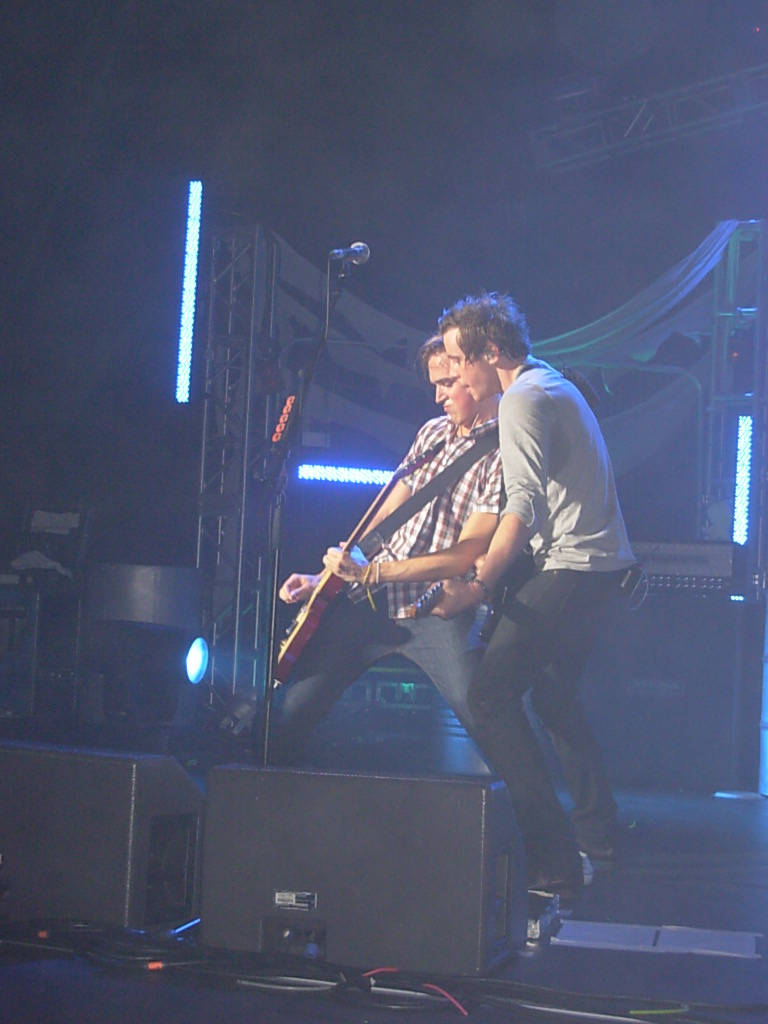
Tom Fletcher and Danny Jones at the Hammersmith Apollo, 1 May 2009.

The first single released from the Radio:Active album was "One for the Radio", a song about as the band's "constant struggle for critical acceptance". The single was premiered on BBC Radio 1's Switch with Nick Grimshaw on 1 June 2008 and was released on 14 July 2008. As of 25 June 2008, "One for the Radio" was included in Radio 2's A list, meaning that it receives primary airplay during the daytime. The single charted at number 2 in the charts. The album was recorded, and produced in Australia. McFly performed a showcase concert on 10 July 2008 at Shepherd's Bush Empire and performed another concert at KOKO on 24 July 2008 as part of the iTunes Live Festival '08. An EP of the performance, released 4 August 2008, was made available to download from the iTunes Store. The second single from the album, "Lies", was released on 15 September 2008 and reached number 4 in the charts.

McFly embarked on their sixth arena tour in 2008, starting from 7 November 2008, attending 14 dates, supported by manufactured pop band Avenue and Indie pop rock band Reemer. They also performed four concerts in Brazil from 5 October 2008 to 11 October 2008. The third single from the album was "Do Ya/Stay With Me", released 23 November 2008. The song was released in aid of 2008's Children in Need and reached number 18 in the UK Singles Chart, the lowest charting position of any of their singles to date, and their first single not to reach Top 10. In 2009 McFly decided to once again arrange a tour to situate smaller venues, this time being called Up Close... And This Time It's Personal starting on 18 April in Amsterdam. They then did 14 dates in the UK before going on to do 7 dates in South America including Brasil, Argentina and Chile. David Archuleta, the American Idol runner up, supported them on their UK stint.

McFly achieved their third number 1 album, Radio:Active, with the Radio:Active – Live at Wembley Tour DVD on 17 May 2009. The Up Close... And This Time It's Personal tour ended on 9 June. Later this month Mcfly did 3 shows for the forestry commission, which are concerts that take place every year to raise awareness of the UK forests. They were supported by indie-rock band Vagabond. Also in June, McFly made a surprise appearance at the Jonas Brothers' show at Wembley Stadium on 15 June, joining them on stage to sing "Star Girl".

=== 2010–2012: Above the Noise and Memory Lane: The Best of McFly ===
In Autumn 2010, McFly re-signed and partnered with their previous Label (Island Records) to create and launch an interactive website, Super City, which provided fans with unprecedented access to the band. Subscribers would be able to download CDs before they were sold in stores. They would also gain access to video streams, web-chats, VIP access at gigs, and first call on tickets. This website was developed in a hope to combat any leaks (piracy) and gain loyalty from their fans, as they would have access to any new materials before they could be leaked. The website had about 50,000 visitors the first day, causing the site to shut down for two weeks.

The first single from their fifth album, "Party Girl", was written in Atlanta with Dallas Austin. It premiered on 14 July on BBC Radio 1 and was released on 5 September and reached number 6 in the UK charts. The "Party Girl" music video was voted number 1 by fans, in the 4Music Video Honours of 2010. The album, Above the Noise, was released on 15 November. It debuted at number 20 in the album charts and reached number 7 in the album download charts. The second single released from the album was "Shine a Light", a song penned with Taio Cruz. "Shine a Light" reached number 3 in the UK charts. The third single, "That's the Truth", was released on 6 March 2011.

The band made a mini 30-minute-long movie titled Nowhere Left to Run which featured a vampire theme along with a sex scene involving Judd. The "Party Girl" video was taken from the movie. This was released on DVD on 29 November exclusively to HMV stores. The film has since been panned by the band themselves.

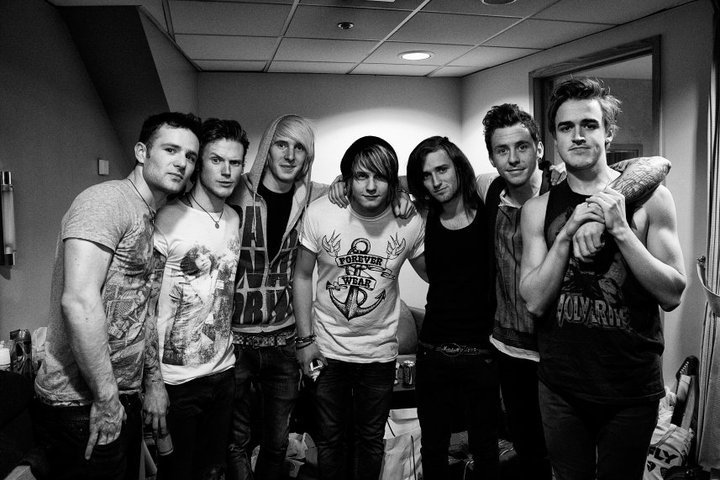
Backstage at McFly's Above the Noise Tour

In August 2011, McFly announced that they would be doing a tour consisting of 26 dates around the UK in March/April 2012. On 1 November McFly teamed up with Gioia Jewellery to release their first official jewellery range designs include each member's SuperCity logo. On 4 December, Poynter won the eleventh series of I'm a Celebrity...Get Me Out of Here!. On 17 December, Judd won the ninth series of Strictly Come Dancing.

On the band's latest tour, entitled Keep Calm and Play Louder Tour, they showcased three brand new songs entitled "Do Whatcha", "Red" and "Touch the Rain", all of which would be on their sixth studio album.

Judd was invited to carry the Olympic Torch as part of the Olympic Torch Relay Run for the 2012 London Olympics. On 4 August 2012, McFly played for a crowd of 50,000 people at an outdoor show in Hyde Park as part of the Olympic BTLondonLive celebration.

In September 2012, McFly played four shows in America. Two at L.A.'s famed Roxy and two at New York's legendary Gramercy Theatre. All four shows sold out in less than a minute and fans lined up hours before the shows. On the American shows, they premiered another brand new song entitled "Love Is Easy". In 2012, it was announced an autobiography entitled Unsaid Things: Our Story would be due for release on Amazon Stores in October 2012 and to coincide with the autobiography, the band also announced that they would be releasing another Greatest Hits album. Fletcher announced on Twitter that their next single would be "Red" as it had been so well received on the tour but this was later changed to "Love Is Easy", which was released on 11 November 2012, a week before the new Greatest Hits compilation.

In September 2012, for the final Chris Moyles Show, the band put together a special video for Chris's feature McFly day, where he would normally play Star Girl every Friday (since January 2010), this latest edition was called Star Boy as a tribute, thanking Chris Moyles for playing "Star Girl" every week.

In October 2012, it was announced that they would release a greatest hits which is titled Memory Lane: The Best of McFly featuring most of the band's hits and 3 brand new songs, Love Is Easy, "Do Whatcha" and "Cherry Cola". The album was released on 26 November 2012 and the new single "Love Is Easy" was released on 18 November 2012. It debuted at number 10, with the album following at number 21. A few weeks before "Love Is Easy" was due to go on sale, McFly announced that they would bring the release date forward a week, meaning that the new release date would be 11 November 2012. In November 2012, they also announced that they would be doing 18 tour dates in the UK between April and May 2013 in support of the album.

On 11 October 2012, McFly published their first autobiography, Unsaid Things: Our Story, named after a song from their first album. The book was a tell-all story which featured exclusive information that they revealed for the first time from the band's start to their present. They shared stories about their childhoods, the band's rise to fame and even the challenges they faced along the way.

=== 2013–2015: Planned sixth studio album and McBusted ===
McFly confirmed that they would embark an original 18-date tour (21 later) to promote their 2012 Memory Lane: The Best of McFly album which would run from April–May. They were joined for some for these dates by James Bourne. McFly went on several writing trips for the writing stage of this album and worked with Matt Willis and Bourne in writing. Titles for songs were to be "Hyperion", "Break Me", "We Were Only Kids", "Dare You To Move", "Hammer Ring", "Josephine", "Love Is Easy", "Do Watcha", "Cherry Cola", "Red", "Love Is on the Radio" and "Touch the Rain". "Love Is Easy" was released as a single in 2012 while "Do Watcha" and "Cherry Cola" were both featured on Memory Lane: The Best of McFly. "Red" and "Touch the Rain" were both previewed during McFly's Keep Calm and Play Louder tour in 2012. "Love Is on the Radio" was previewed during McFly's 10th anniversary shows at the Royal Albert Hall in 2013. "Love Is on the Radio", the first single taken from their new album, was released on 24 November. The album was due to be released in the northern spring of 2014, but this has been put on hold. In the McBusted biography by Jennifer Parker it was hinted that the sixth album was abandoned in favour of the debut album of McBusted. In November 2013, the band wrote and performed the new theme tune to The Paul O'Grady Show.

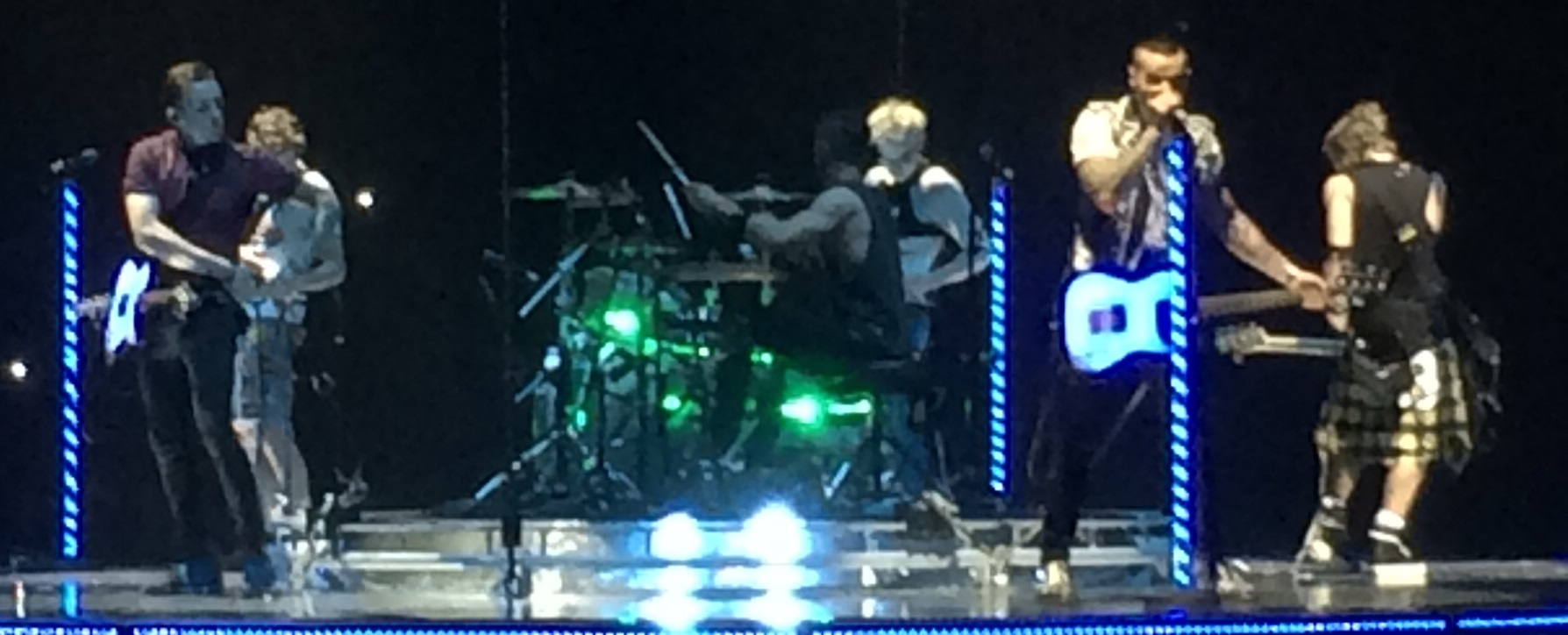
McBusted performing in 2014

In late January 2013, McFly went on a writing trip with Bourne and wrote five songs. In early April, McFly uploaded a video of an acoustic live demo called 'My TVR' to their official YouTube account. The song was written with Bourne. On 19 May the band announced via their Twitter page that they would also be playing a two-date special concert at the Royal Albert Hall in celebration of their 10th anniversary as a band. Due to huge demand, two extra dates were announced. In addition, the Saturday show was streamed live from the band's website for fans who couldn't attend. During an interview with the Big Top 40 Webchat, Fletcher described the shows as his "favourite shows we've ever played". All four shows were held in September and featured McBusted, a surprise collaboration between McFly and Busted, minus Charlie Simpson. Following the shows with Busted, the two bands announced a 30-date UK arena tour as McBusted. The McBusted Tour was the biggest tour of 2014.

In 2015, they embarked on a second McBusted tour, McBusted's Most Excellent Adventure Tour. They also released a DVD following the tour.

On 21 June, a solo interview by Fletcher was published by Fabulous magazine in time for Father's Day. Fletcher stated that "McBusted was an opportunity to have fun without knowing where it would take us, but McFly is for life. McBusted has been amazing fun, but it's not where our passion is. McFly is more than a band, we live and breathe it. We want to make album number six."

On a documentary with Fearne Cotton, Jones confirmed that McFly have three unreleased albums. The band were on a hiatus but Jones hinted at a future reunion, stating "It's really nice to have a bit of breathing space after 12½ years with McFly. We've never really had this time off, so we'll give it a few months and see how we feel. When we're all refreshed, we'll go and smash an album."

=== 2016: Return as McFly and The Anthology ===
On 25 April 2016, the band announced that they would be going back on tour in June 2016, where they would be playing all five albums and including some original new songs for a potential new album over three dates in each of four chosen cities: Glasgow, Birmingham, Manchester and London, with the tour called "The Anthology". Talking to 1883 Magazine, Fletcher said: "After doing two massive Arena tours with McBusted, we really wanted to do something different for this tour to herald the return of McFly. So we're playing some iconic rock venues that will allow our fans to experience the songs in a much more up close and personal environment." They also revealed that they'll be making new music after the tour, with Judd stating, "We all agreed to go on tour first and then that will be the catalyst of what's to come." On 25 May 2016, it was announced the band would have to postpone the Anthology Tour due to Judd herniating a disc in his neck. McFly eventually toured in September 2016.

=== 2016–2019: Indefinite hiatus ===
After the tour, the band revealed that they had scrapped two albums worth of songs recorded since Above the Noise. Fletcher said: "After a certain amount of time, you feel like that was where you were at, at a moment[...] If we released stuff we recorded three years ago, we wouldn't be 100 per cent behind it any more. We still love the songs but we'd be excited about doing new things." The following day, they announced that they would finally begin recording new material in January 2017. In December 2016, Judd revealed that the McBusted-recorded song 'Getting It Out' would have appeared on the band's scrapped album. McFly's return was still in doubt, with Fletcher working on a feature-length film and regularly writing new books. Jones was said to be launching solo music and has had a new born son. In early 2018, it was announced Poynter was to go on tour with the band A. Those tour dates are now completed and it is unknown whether Poynter will play with them again. Judd was promoting his new book 'Get Fit, Get Happy' as well as raising his new son Kit. A writing trip was last taken in January 2017 for their sixth album, otherwise no obvious progression was made towards album six.

On 14 March 2018, the band confirmed via their Twitter account that they were focusing on solo projects in 2018, but looking forward to making more music in the future. The members still supported each other on their individual projects such as Tom, Jones and Judd collaborating in March 2018. All members have stated that new music will eventually be released when the time and music is right.

Poynter started a band called Ink.

Fletcher has several books out, including the Christmasaurus which has been adapted to the stage and Fletcher was working on the film version.

Judd went on tour with a production called Rip It Up, a musical. Jones released his own website with his own music released in July 2018 titled Is This Still Love.

In July 2018, McFly played Matt's anniversary celebrations, the first time performing as a band in almost 2 years.

=== 2019–2024: The Lost Songs, Young Dumb Thrills and Power to Play ===
On 28 December 2018, Poynter confirmed via a podcast on Sappenin' Podcast with Sean Smith that McFly would be returning from their hiatus with a new album during the year and they would also be doing a new tour during the summer.

Following this, on 9 September, the band's Instagram page posted a video of their microphone logo, accompanied by the sound of guitar feedback as the picture comes into focus. This was the first post made by the page since 2017. All members of the band then proceeded to post the same thing on their personal social media profiles, announcing an 'Instagram Live' at 9:30am on the following day (10 September). The announcement involved the band's first album of new material in 9 years, The Lost Songs, as well as their first ever solo show at the O2 Arena (they performed there at the 2010 Jingle Bell Ball). Following the selling-out of the O2 Show the band announced a further eleven tour dates forming an official comeback arena tour in 2020. However, the band rescheduled the tour three times (now called the Young Dumb Thrills Tour due to the ongoing COVID-19 pandemic; they eventually undertook the tour in September 2021.

On 2 July 2020, the band announced they had signed a new record deal with BMG Rights Management and confirmed they will be releasing their first album of new material later in the year. On 27 July 2020, the band announced their sixth studio album, Young Dumb Thrills. Pre-orders began 30 July 2020, with the lead single Happiness releasing on the same day.

The instant gratification single from the new album was "Growing Up" featuring Mark Hoppus, released on 4 September 2020 as the second single. It failed to chart on the UK Singles Top 100 but debuted and peaked at number 80 on the Official Singles Sales Chart Top 100 on 11 September 2020. The third single was "Tonight Is The Night", released on 1 October 2020. On 24 September 2021, they released the single "Dragonball", with lyrics making references to the Japanese manga/anime of the same title. "Dragonball" did not enter the Official UK Top 100 Chart, but debuted and peaked at number 57 on the Official Singles Sales Chart Top 100.

On 2 December 2021, they released their cover version of "Walking in the Air". The single did not enter the Official UK Top 100 Chart, but debuted and peaked at number 25 on the Official Singles Sales Chart Top 100.

On 29 March 2023 the group announced that their seventh studio album, Power to Play, would be released on 9 June 2023. The lead single from the album, "Where Did All The Guitars Go?", was released on 31 March 2023. On 26 April 2023, McFly released the single "God Of Rock & Roll" and announced their Power to Play UK and Ireland tour, scheduled for October–November 2023. Power to Play released on 9 June 2023. On 21 July 2023, the band released the single "Broken By You", a bilingual song (English/Portuguese) featuring Brazilian band Fresno. McFly brought the Power To Play tour to Brazil for 3 nights in May 2024.

=== 2025: Busted vs McFly Tour ===
On 9 October 2024, during McFly's concert at the O2 Arena, Busted and McFly announced the Busted vs McFly Tour for 2025. This marks the first time all seven members of each band have performed together since Busted invited McFly to tour with them in 2003.

Busted member James Bourne pulled out of the tour due to undisclosed health issues. He made a statement on Instagram, stating that 'there’s a lot of information I still don’t have about my condition but my bandmates, management and I are unanimous in deciding that I should focus on the medical stuff'. Bandmates Matt Willis and Charlie Simpson stated though they were close to cancelling the tour, Bourne wished it to continue and he was replaced by his younger brother Chris Bourne.

James didn't play any of the shows.

== Super Records ==
Super Records Ltd. is an independent label operated and owned by McFly. Initially, McFly were signed to major record outlet Universal Island Records. Although they have left Universal, McFly's singles are distributed by a company named "Absolute" who also distribute for acts like Cascada and Jay Sean and are part of the Universal Group. Super Records was created after McFly decided to leave Island, Universal Records at the end of 2007. They returned to Island, Universal for their fifth album, Above the Noise (2010).

== Television and film appearances ==
Throughout the early years, McFly were regular guests on CBBC and CD:UK.

In January 2005, the band guest-starred in an episode of the long-running British drama series Casualty. In May 2006, they starred in the American romantic comedy film Just My Luck with Lindsay Lohan and Chris Pine, which was released in the US on 12 May 2006 and in the UK on 30 June 2006. They play themselves in the film and the soundtrack features a variety of their songs from their first two albums. The band also recorded another song, "Just My Luck", which was to be included on the US-only album release of the same name. McFly held a concert at the London Hammersmith Apollo on 19 May 2005 which was used in the film. The UK premiere of the film took place on 28 June 2006 in London. The film generally did not receive good reviews, gaining a 13% rating on Rotten Tomatoes.

On 16 March 2007, McFly guest starred in the Top Gear comic relief show Top Gear of the Pops, where they were given a challenge to come up with a song from scratch without using the words 'love', 'baby', or 'heart', and including the words 'sofa', 'administration', and 'Hyundai'. Near the end of the show they performed the song they named 'The Top Gear Blues'. It was later renamed 'Sofa, Hyundai, Administration' and placed as a B-side on "The Heart Never Lies" single. On 23 June 2007, McFly made a cameo appearance in an episode of the science fiction series Doctor Who. The episode "The Sound of Drums", saw the band appearing in a spoof party political broadcast, which featured testimonials from British celebrities such as McFly and Sharon Osbourne showing their support and trying to encourage others to "Vote Saxon!" in support of Mr Saxon (The Master played by John Simm) to become Prime Minister of the United Kingdom.

On 22 October 2007, McFly hosted the first annual Nickelodeon UK Kids Choice Awards. McFly also appeared on the show Ghosthunting with... in 2007.

On 27 May 2008, McFly appeared on Gordon Ramsay's The F Word as the celebrity guests and cooked a three course meal for 50 customers. Their score was that 115 out of 150 dishes were paid for. On 20 July 2008, McFly also played at T4 on the Beach in Weston-super-Mare.

McFly's performance at KOKO on 24 July 2008, as part of the iTunes Live Festival '08, was broadcast at Vue cinemas across the UK on the same day.

On 25 August 2008, McFly performed at the London 2012 Olympic Visa Party. On 14 December, they were the headline music act for Miss World in South Africa, which had a predicted worldwide audience of over 2 billion viewers. Their hits "5 Colours in Her Hair" and "Lies" were played during the show. They appeared in teen soap Hollyoaks on Channel 4 on Friday, 8 May 2009 performing in the SU Bar with The Somethings as a support group. On 31 May 2009, McFly performed at the biggest TV show in Brazil Domingão do Faustão which had a predicted audience of over 30 million viewers. In June and July 2009, they did a Woodland tour, performing at forest venues around the UK. In October 2008 McFly performed on the 50th birthday episode of Blue Peter, live outside BBC Television Centre.

The Derren Brown stage show Enigma (2009–10) concluded with a video of McFly performing a version of the song. The new lyrics included Brown's prediction of the order in which randomly chosen members of the audience would shuffle a number of pictures.

A recording of the live stage show first aired on Channel 4 on 6 January 2011. McFly made a return to T4 on the Beach in July 2011.

Fletcher took on The Cube in a celebrity special in the 3rd season and walked away with £100,000. Judd appeared on and won a Children in Need special episode of Strictly Come Dancing, with his partner Ola Jordan. The following year Judd won the 9th series of Strictly Come Dancing with his dance partner Aliona Vilani. Poynter won the 11th series of the UK TV series I'm a Celebrity...Get Me Out of Here!. Poynter and Judd appeared on the "Hunks Special" of Celebrity Juice on 1 March 2012. Jones also participated in 2010's Popstar to Operastar, placing 5th.

The band had their own McFly on the Wall documentary series in 2011. It followed the band as they embarked on their latest UK tour. It ran for 6 episodes. The first episode aired on Five Star on 11 May, and the last episode aired on 15 June. In 2012 McFly appeared on the celebrity edition of Deal or No Deal in which they won £10,000 for their chosen charities.

On 8 December 2012, McFly appeared as themselves on ITV in a one-off special called The McFly Show. It featured special guests, comedy sketches and the band performing their hit songs.

On 23 March 2013, McFly performed a one-off concert as part of an event organised by World Wide Fund for Nature (WWF) for Earth Hour 2013 which was broadcast live via YouTube.

On 21 September 2013, McFly were the guest band on the BBC One show When Miranda Met Bruce with Miranda Hart and Bruce Forsyth.

Since 2017, Jones has appeared as a coach on The Voice Kids UK. This is aired on ITV.

In 2021, Fletcher took part in the 19th season of the UK TV series Strictly Come Dancing. He and his partner, Amy Dowden, were eliminated 8th.

In 2023, Judd announced he would compete in Celebrity Race Across the World, with his mother, Emma. The mother/son duo came 2nd place in the race overall.

In 2024, Jones won Series 5 of The Masked Singer UK as "Piranha" covering hits including "It's All Coming Back to Me now", which peaked at number two on the UK singles chart.

In 2024, Jones and Fletcher appeared and won as coaches on The Voice UK with their finalist AVA. They were the first double chair for the UK series. This is aired on ITV.

In 2024, Jones won the twenty-fourth series of I'm a Celebrity...Get Me Out of Here.

== Influence ==
McFly have been cited as having influenced a number of high-profile musicians in various different ways. Niall Horan and Louis Tomlinson of One Direction, have credited McFly as the opening act of the first concert they had ever attended. Speaking about meeting with the group, Jones said "it turned out that Niall and Louis were at one of our first ever shows. And they were all like, 'we copied your haircuts, and you made us want to play guitar', which is really amazing to hear. They're the biggest band in the world right now. And their favourite band was us! We influenced them. It's really strange, because you feel like a veteran!". Reviews for One Direction's debut album, Up All Night, had credited McFly as a notable influence, and Horan stated the group were very happy to have such a comparison noted. McFly had contributed song-writing to the first three studio albums that the group released.

Also citing McFly as influences are British pop rock band The Vamps, who supported McFly on their 2013 Memory Lane tour. Guitarist and vocalist James McVey stated "McFly is a band we love to be compared to over other bands, simply for the fact of their good musicianship. They write very well and they're very energetic on stage, which is something we try to replicate in our own performances." Drummer Tristan Evans also spoke of the band, explaining "McFly were an influence on me wanting to get into music and we feel like the next generation of their take on pop," while bassist Connor Ball continued "They're chilled-out and we hope we can have that calm attitude if we ever get that successful." Frontman Brad Simpson also referred to McFly when asked about influences, stating "Their debut album was a first in all of our collections". 5 Seconds of Summer have themselves confirmed that McFly are an influence on their music on a number of occasions, while they have also been compared to McFly in reviews. When UK pop/R&B group Rixton were asked which bands they had looked up to when they were younger, Jake Roche said, "I listened to a lot of McFly when I was growing up. I was a part of that era."

Asked about influencing a new generation of bands, Jones stated, "There's a few bands, like the 1D boys, and they're all getting to that age where Busted or McFly was the first gig they ever went to. It's really nice to see that bands are taking influence from what you do." He continued, "to actually see people in bands picking up guitars and doing their thing – any musical influence that we can give them – is amazing to see."

== Discography ==
Studio albums

- Room on the 3rd Floor (2004)
- Wonderland (2005)
- Motion in the Ocean (2006)
- Radio:Active (2008)
- Above the Noise (2010)
- Young Dumb Thrills (2020)
- Power to Play (2023)

== Members ==
- Tom Fletcher – lead and backing vocals, rhythm guitar, piano, ukulele (2003–present)
- Danny Jones – lead and backing vocals, lead guitar, harmonica (2003–present)
- Dougie Poynter – bass guitar, backing and lead vocals (2003–present)
- Harry Judd – drums, percussion (2003–present)

Touring members

- Isaac Aryee – keyboards (2006–2012)
- Adam Marc – keyboards (2022–present)

== Tours ==
- McFly: The Tour (2004)
- Wonderland (2005)
- Motion in the Ocean (2006) (originally titled "2006 Tour")
- Up Close and Personal (2007)
- Greatest Hits (2007)
- Radio:Active (2008)
- Up Close ... and This Time It's Personal (2009)
- Before the Noise (2010)
- Above the Noise (2011)
- Keep Calm & Play Louder (2012)
- 10th Anniversary Concerts (2013)
- Memory Lane (2013)
- McBusted: Busted & McFly (2014) (as McBusted)
- McBusted's Most Excellent Adventure Tour (2015) (as McBusted)
- MCBUSTED (2015) (Australian tour as McBusted)
- Anthology Tour (2016)
- One Night Only (2019)
- The 2020 Tour (2020) (Promoting The Lost Songs - cancelled due to Covid)
- 2020 Brasil Tour (2020) (Promoting The Lost Songs - cancelled due to Covid)
- Young Dumb Thrills Tour (2021) (rescheduled/rebranded 2020 cancelled tour)
- One Night Only... Again (2021)
- 2022 Brasil Tour (2022)(rescheduled/rebranded 2020 cancelled tour)
- Power to Play Tour (2023)
- Power to Play Brasil (2024)
- 21st Birthday Parties (2024) (Originally titled "21st Birthday Party")
- Busted Vs McFly Tour (2025)

== Awards ==
Number ones in the UK Singles Chart

(1) Five Colours in Her Hair (4 April 2004)
(2) Obviously (27 June 2004)
(3) All About You (13 March 2005)
(4) I'll Be OK (21 August 2005)
(5) Don't Stop Me Now (23 July 2006)
(6) Star Girl (29 October 2006)
(7) Baby's Coming Back (13 May 2007)

2004

- Walt Disney Awards – Best Newcomer
- Smash Hits Awards – Best UK Band
- Smash Hits Awards – Best Album for Room on the 3rd Floor
- Smash Hits Awards – Best Video for "That Girl"
- Smash Hits Awards – Best Stars of the Year
- Smash Hits Awards – Most Fanciable Male (Danny Jones)

2005

- Smash Hits Awards – Best UK Band
- Smash Hits Awards – Most Snoggable Male (Danny Jones)
- Smash Hits Awards – Best Single for "All About You'"
- Smash Hits Awards – Best Album for Wonderland
- BRIT Awards – Best Pop Act

2006

- Virgin.net Music Awards – God Group
- BT Digital Music Award for People's Choice Award for Best Official Music Site

2007

- Nickelodeon UK Kids Choice Awards – Best Band (also hosted)
- UK Festival Awards – Best Pop Act (for appearance at V Festival)
- Virgin.net Music Awards – Best Live Act

2008

- Nickelodeon UK Kids Choice Awards – Best Band
- Star Smash Awards 2008 – Best Album (Radio:ACTIVE)
- Star Smash Awards 2008 – Best Band
- Star Smash Awards 2008 – Artist of the Year

2009

- Meus Premios Nickelodeon Brazil 2009– Best International Artist
- UK Music Video Awards – Best Live Music Coverage
- News of the World – The Most Sexiest Men of the Year (Dougie Poynter)
- Also nominated for MTV Latin Awards

2010

- 4Music Video Honours – Best Video of 2010 for Party Girl

2011

- Nordoff Robbins – American Express Digital Innovation Award
- In Rock Magazine – Best British Band

2012

- Nordoff Robbins Music Awards – Best Live Act

2013

- The Verified Teen Awards – Best Live Act
- The Verified Teen Awards – Best Band

2014

- Nickelodeon Kids' Choice Awards UK – Favourite UK Band of the Decade (Honorary award)

== Publications ==
- McFly – Unsaid Things...Our Story
