= One for the Radio =

2008 single by McFly

- One of artwork variants

Single by McFly

from the album Radio:Active
- Released: 9 July 2008
- Recorded: 2008
- Genre: Pop punk
- Length: 3:06
- Label: Super Records/EMI
- Songwriter(s): Tom Fletcher
- Producer(s): Jason Perry

McFly singles chronology
"The Heart Never Lies" (2007)	"One for the Radio" (2008)	"Lies" (2008)

"One for the Radio" is a single by British band McFly, released as the first single from their fourth studio album, Radio:Active, which was released 20 July 2008 as a giveaway with the Mail on Sunday. The band's 14th single overall, "One for the Radio" is described as being about the band's "constant struggle for critical acceptance". The single was premiered on BBC Radio 1's Switch with Nick Grimshaw on 1 June 2008. It was the first single that was released under the band's new record label, Super Records, and was also the first McFly single to be A Listed at BBC Radio 1 since "Five Colours in Her Hair".

"One for the Radio" debuted and peak at number two on the UK Singles Chart, behind Dizzee Rascal's "Dance wiv Me", becoming the band's 14th consecutive top 10 single and 13th top-five hit. On the Scottish Singles Chart, the song debuted at the top spot, becoming McFly's eight number one on that chart. Despite its chart success, it remained in the UK top 40 for only two weeks and finished at number 195 on the UK's year-end chart for 2008, the lowest-selling number two of the year. Elsewhere, the song charted in Ireland and Brazil; in the latter country, it received a Platinum certification for sales of over 60,000 downloads.

The music video for the single premiered on 29 June 2008. It was shot in Toronto, Canada and directed by Sum 41's drummer, Steve Jocz. The opening sequence of the video is a reenactment of the beginning scene in the 1985 movie "Back to the Future," from which McFly got their name. The movie features Michael J. Fox, and the McFly video shows Danny Jones, one of the singers and lead guitarists of the band doing the same thing.

== Track listing ==
UK CD1

1. "One for the Radio" (Radio Edit) - 3:07
2. "Do Ya" (Acoustic Version) - 2:55

UK CD2

1. "One for the Radio" (Radio Edit) - 3:07
2. "Falling in Love" (Acoustic Version) - 4:11

UK CD3

1. "One for the Radio" (Radio Edit) - 3:07
2. "POV" (Acoustic Version) - 4:01

== Charts ==
=== Weekly charts ===
Chart (2008)	Peak position
Europe (Eurochart Hot 100)	12
Ireland (IRMA)	20
Scotland (OCC)	1
UK Singles (OCC)	2

=== Year-end charts ===
Chart (2008)	Position
UK Singles (OCC)	195

== Certifications ==
Region	Certification	Certified units/sales
Brazil (Pro-Música Brasil)	Platinum	60,000^{*}
^{*} Sales figures based on certification alone.

== Release history ==
Region	Date	Label
Ireland	9 July 2008	Super Records
United Kingdom	14 July 2008	Super Records
Brazil	18 December 2008	EMI Music Brazil
Japan	February 2009	Avex Trax
