= Dougie Poynter =

English musician (born 1987)

- Poynter in 2022

Background information
- Born: Dougie Lee Poynter; 30 November 1987 (age 38); Orsett, Essex, England
- Genres: Pop rock; pop punk; alternative rock; punk rock
- Occupations: Singer; musician; songwriter; author; model
- Instruments: Bass guitar; vocals; guitar
- Years active: 2003–present
- Labels: Island (2003–07, 2010–present); Super (2008–present)
- Member of: McFly
- Formerly of: McBusted
- Website: mcfly.com

Dougie Lee Poynter (born 30 November 1987) is an English musician, songwriter, fashion model, aspiring clothing designer and children's author. He is the bassist of the pop rock band McFly. He won the eleventh series of the ITV reality series I'm a Celebrity...Get Me Out of Here!.

== Biography ==
=== Early life ===
Poynter was born in Orsett, Essex, England. He went to school at Herd Lane Primary School and Gable Hall School, both located in neighbouring Corringham. He has one sister.

=== Musical career ===
==== McFly ====
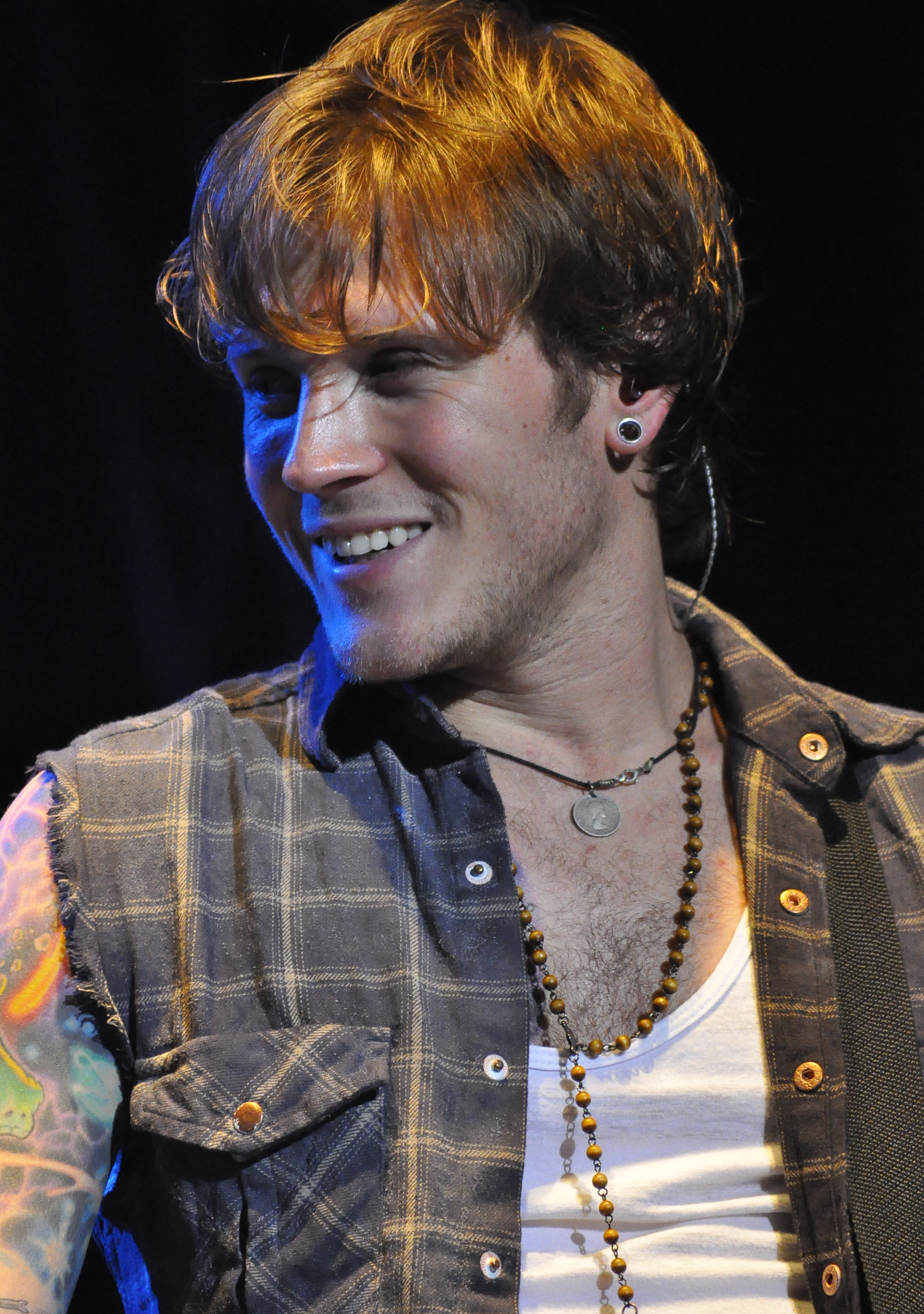
Poynter performing in 2011

In 2003, a then 15 year-old Poynter auditioned for and subsequently became the bass player for the British band McFly. The band consists of Poynter, Tom Fletcher (vocals/guitar), Danny Jones (guitar/vocals), and Harry Judd (drums).

McFly rose to fame with their first single, "Five Colours in Her Hair," which was released March 2004 and entered the UK Singles Chart at number one in April 2004. Their first album, Room on the 3rd Floor, also hit number one in the UK Albums Chart and would earn McFly a Guinness World Record for being the youngest band to have a debut album enter the chart in the top position, previously held by the Beatles. That year, McFly would support Busted on tour before going on to headline a personal tour in September 2004.

The band's second studio album, Wonderland, was released in 2005 followed by Motion in the Ocean in 2006. A Greatest Hits compilation was released in 2007 followed by two more studio albums: Radio: Active (2008) and Above the Noise (2010).

A second greatest hits album, Memory Lane: The Best of McFly, was released in November 2012. Also in 2012, the band debuted their first written autobiography, McFly: Unsaid Things... Our Story with Transworld Publishers Ltd.

In April 2016, McFly announced that they would be going on tour for a three-night residency in Glasgow, Birmingham, Manchester, and London. The Anthology tour, in which they will play all five of their albums, will serve as McFly's first live reunion since 2013. The tour was postponed from June until September 2016 after drummer Harry Judd injured his neck.

==== McBusted ====
In November 2013, McFly joined the band Busted to form the super-group, McBusted. They played a 34-date tour called The McBusted Tour. It was the biggest UK tour of 2014. McBusted concluded the tour headlining the British Summer Time concert series in Hyde Park where they performed for an audience of over 60,000 attendees.

In 2015, the band went on tour for a second time. McBusted's Most Excellent Adventure Tour consisted of 21 shows.

==== INK ====
In 2018, Poynter announced on his Instagram he had joined Todd Dorigo and Corey Alexander to form a new alt-rock band INK. That same day, they released their debut EP Heaven and announced a small UK tour. However, a second tour was cancelled due to 'uncontrollable circumstances'. With no formal announcement, the tour was rescheduled without Poynter, who couldn't attend due to the reformation of McFly. He was replaced by Elliot Morgan.

=== Fashion career ===
Poynter made his runway debut in January 2016 at the Joshua Kane with Lab Series Autumn/Winter show for London Collections Men. Off the catwalk, Poynter is a front-row fixture at LCM and other global fashion weeks, garnering invites from top brands including Topman, Burberry, Louis Vuitton, Moschino, and Saint Laurent Paris. Runway-side, Poynter is celebrated for his trend-setting personal style.

Poynter served as a guest fashion writer for Fault Magazine during LCM in June 2016. He provided an insider's perspective with his recaps of Topman S/S 2017, Katy Eary S/S 2017, and Christopher Raeburn S/S 2017. His most notable editorial work includes the fashion film At Full Tilt for Vogue India (August 2014), an online exclusive for Notion Magazine (August 2015), and a spread in Issue 19 of Adon Magazine (March 2016). Poynter also modelled alongside his then-girlfriend Ellie Goulding in the February 2016 issue of Glamour.

== Songwriting ==
In addition to his work with McFly, Poynter has written collaboratively for talent such as 5 Seconds of Summer and One Direction (for the track "I Would" from the album Take Me Home and for the track "Don’t Forget Where You Belong" from the album Midnight Memories, respectively). He also worked alongside seasoned artists Mark Hoppus (Blink 182) and Alex Gaskarth (All Time Low) to develop the album for the McFly + Busted supergroup, McBusted. He is also credited in Busted's album "Half Way There" for the song "Nineties".

Poynter and fellow McFly member Jones operate as a musical production duo known as Sidequest. In 2026, the pair co-wrote and co-produced "Delusional" by girl group Remember Monday, who supported McFly on their 2026 tour.

== Other work ==
Poynter won I'm a Celebrity...Get Me Out of Here! in 2011.

Poynter wrote a children's book with McFly band-mate Tom Fletcher titled The Dinosaur that Pooped Christmas. It sold over 72,000 copies and became the most popular debut children's novel of 2012. The follow-up book titled The Dinosaur That Pooped A Planet was released the following year in August 2013. Poynter also wrote the children's book Plastic Sucks!: How YOU Can Reduce Single-Use Plastic and Save Our Planet (2019).

Poynter is also an active participant of The 5 Gyres Institute and their mission to eradicate the pollution of plastic in the ocean. He supports the banning of microplastic materials across Europe, citing the serious detrimental impact of these substances on the marine environment as the reason of his disapproval.

Poynter has also been part of charity endeavors alongside McFly. The band has raised money for causes such as Comic Relief, Children in Need, Live 8, Sport Relief, and Earth Hour.

In addition to this, Poynter has founded various clothing lines. His skate clothing brand Zookie is still active under different ownership. He also owned and founded Saint Kidd, and Polonius, both of which are no longer trading.

== Personal life ==
Poynter dated Frankie Bridge (née Sandford) of The Saturdays from 2008 to 2010. His relationship with fellow musician Ellie Goulding was confirmed in February 2014; the couple split in 2016.

He has been in a relationship with actress Yasmeen Scott since late 2021.

He is related to Josh Franceschi, the lead singer of You Me at Six.

Preceded by Stacey Solomon	I'm a Celebrity... Get Me Out of Here! Winner & King of the Jungle; 2011	Succeeded by Charlie Brooks
