= Danny Jones =

British musician and singer (born 1986)

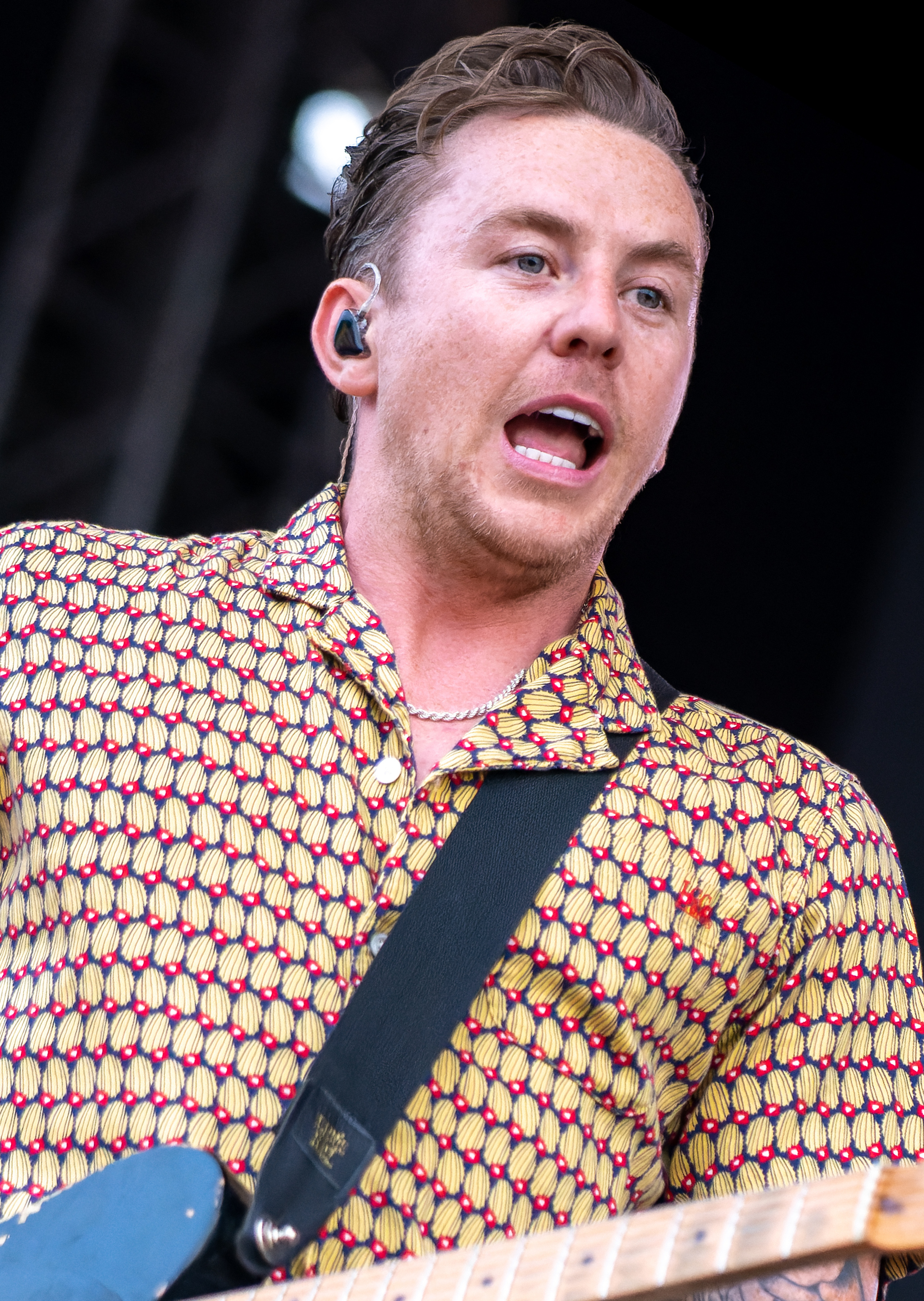
- Jones in 2022
- Born: Daniel Alan David Jones; 12 March 1986 (age 40); Bolton, Greater Manchester, England
- Occupations: Singer; musician; songwriter; producer; actor
- Years active: 2003–present
- Spouse: Georgia Horsley (m. 2014)
- Children: 1
- Musical career
- Genre: Pop rock
- Instruments: Vocals; guitar; harmonica; percussion
- Labels: Island; Super
- Member of: McFly
- Formerly of: McBusted
- Website: McFly

Daniel Alan David Jones (born 12 March 1986) is a British singer, songwriter and musician who is one of the lead vocalists and the lead guitarist for pop-rock band McFly.

From 2018, Jones released a handful of solo singles, with his debut EP being released in 2019. He also appeared as a coach and mentor on The Voice Kids UK (2017–2023), and The Voice UK (2024–2026). In 2024, he won the fifth series of The Masked Singer UK and the 24th series of I'm a Celebrity...Get Me Out of Here!.

== Early life ==
Jones was born and raised in Breightmet in Bolton, Greater Manchester, where his mother runs a hairdressing business. He was educated at Thornleigh Salesian College and, briefly, Haberdashers’ Boys’ School. He and his sister Vicky were interested in music from an early age. In 2014, Vicky took part in the third series of The Voice but was eliminated during the battle round. Jones attended Bury College where he studied for a BTEC National Diploma in music.

When their father walked out on the family when Danny was eighteen, it left a lasting impression on him. Not long after, he and Vicky co-wrote the song "Don't Know Why" (released on McFly's second album Wonderland).

== McFly ==
McFly rose to fame in 2004, partly due to their association with Busted; McFly supported Busted on their A Present for Everyone Tour. Jones met Fletcher when he auditioned for the "boy band" V (he mistakenly perceived V as similar in style to the future Busted). Fletcher, who was filming the auditions for Island Records, later approached Jones. The two conversed and discovered common interests, leading to a songwriting session between Fletcher, Jones and Busted's James Bourne.

When they finished writing projects for Busted, Fletcher and Jones began writing for their own, then-unnamed band. They temporarily moved into the InterContinental Hotel in London, United Kingdom (UK). Drummer Judd and bassist Poynter were subsequently recruited through an advertisement placed by Fletcher and Jones in NME magazine.

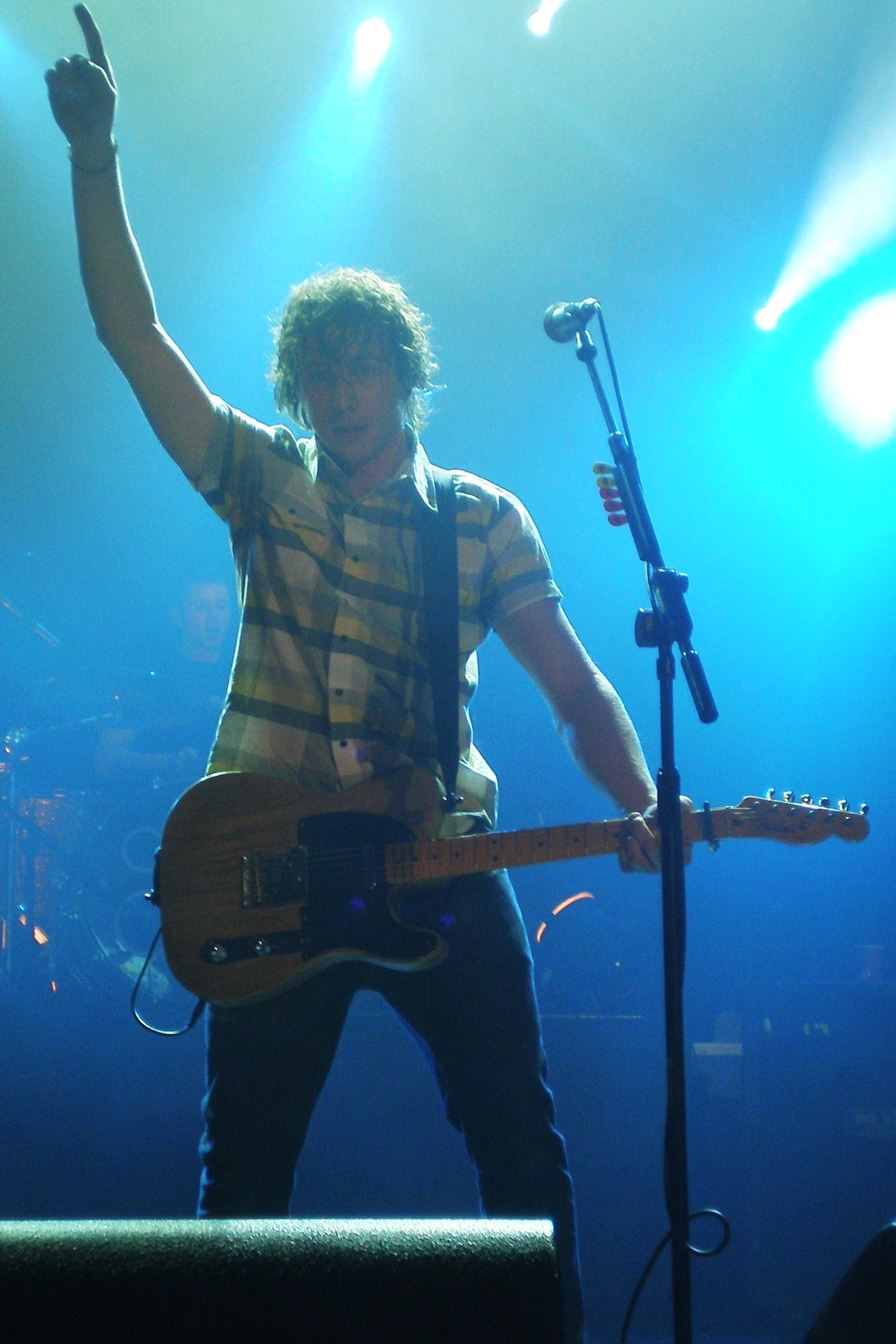
Jones performing at iTunes Live.

Jones, working with his fellow band members, has co-written all five of McFly's studio albums. He also penned three of his own solo tracks on the first three McFly albums. He has also produced tracks for McFly and other musicians; for example, he produced the song, "Only The Strong Survive", from McFly's fourth studio album "Radio:ACTIVE", as well as his band's cover of Rihanna's "Umbrella". Jones has also been listed as a producer for McFly's 6th studio album, which has still not been released but will soon be according to the band. He has also produced countless demos for his band, alongside Fletcher. Jones also takes the role of lead guitarist in most performances, with Fletcher playing rhythm guitar. He can be seen performing solos in songs such as "That Girl", "I Wanna Hold You", "Everybody Knows", and "Transylvania".

The McFly song "The Ballad of Paul K", which he co-wrote with McFly bandmate Dougie Poynter, whose father also left home, was based on both their experiences.

As a side project, Jones works on remixes for his band's songs, including "Party Girl" or "Nowhere Left to Run", and "Take Me There". Some remixes can be found as b-sides on singles released from the album Above the Noise.

== Other work ==
Jones is a music producer and keen DJ. After McFly's direction changed it was announced he would remix "Party Girl" as a b-side of the single after that he remixed "Nowhere Left to Run" for the "That's the Truth" single. After this success Jones played songs such as "Take Me There" or "End of the World" and "IF U C Kate" as well as his other remixes. Jones also works with DJ Roger Sanchez under the name 'The Saturn V'. Jones has toured England as a DJ and is set to release songs called "Gone" and "Around Me" with Sanchez, also a remix of Rihanna's song "We Found Love". Jones produced a bonus track for One Direction on their second album, Take Me Home, and wrote "Don't Forget Where You Belong" from their third album, Midnight Memories. From 2017 to 2023, Jones was featured as a coach on the children's singing competition The Voice Kids UK, winning the 2019 series with his artist Sam Wilkinson.

Jones released his debut solo single, "Is This Still Love", in 2018. The single peaked at number 44 on the UK Singles Downloads Chart. He released a further five singles from his debut EP, titled EP, in 2019.

In 2024, Jones participated in and won the fifth series of The Masked Singer as "Piranha". He released his cover of "It's All Coming Back to Me Now" with McFly, which peaked at number two on the UK Singles Chart. From 2024 to 2026, Jones was featured as a coach on The Voice UK with Tom Fletcher in a duo chair. The duo was the winning coach on their debut series with their artist AVA. In November 2024, Jones starred in the twenty-fourth series of I'm a Celebrity...Get Me Out of Here!, which he ultimately won. He became the second member of McFly to win the series, following Dougie Poynter in 2011. Jones and Poynter operate as a musical production duo known as Sidequest. In 2026, the pair co-wrote and co-produced "Delusional" by girl group Remember Monday, who supported McFly on their 2026 tour.

== Personal life ==
Jones married model and former Miss England, Georgia Horsley on 2 August 2014 in Malton, North Yorkshire.

Jones is a lifelong supporter of his hometown football club Bolton Wanderers. His middle name David is a tribute to former Bolton player David Lee.

Jones suffers with anxiety and has been in therapy since he was 19 after having a panic attack live on TV.

== Discography ==
=== Extended plays ===
Title	Details
EP	Released: 2019; Label: Self-released

=== Solo singles ===
List of solo singles, showing year released and originating album
Title	Year	Peak chart positions	Album
Title	Year	UK Digital	Album
"Is This Still Love"	2018	44	Non-album single
"Muddy Water"	2019	—	EP
"Bad Habits"	2019	—	EP
"$igns"	2019	—	EP
"Talk in the Morning"	2019	—	EP
"Without Me"	2019	—	EP
"Do Not Worry"	2020	—	Non-album singles
"It's All Coming Back to Me Now" (with McFly)	2024	2	Non-album singles

== Filmography ==
=== Television ===
Year	Title	Notes
2005	Casualty	With McFly
2007	Doctor Who	With McFly
2007	Ghosthunting With...	With McFly
2008	The F Word	With McFly
2009	Hollyoaks	With McFly
2009	All Star Family Fortunes	Against Zöe Lucker
2010	Celebrity Juice	Panelist
2010	Popstar to Operastar	Contestant
2011	Celebrity Juice	Panelist
2013	The McFly Show	One off ITV Special
2013	Nevermind the Buzzcocks	Panelist
2017–2023	The Voice Kids UK	Coach/Judge
2018	Celebrity Juice	Panellist
2020	The Cube Christmas Celebrity Special	Contestant
2020	Blankety Blank Christmas Special	Panelist
2021	I Can See Your Voice	Guest Panelist
2022	Celebrity MasterChef	Contestant
2024	The Masked Singer	Contestant ("Piranha"); Winner
2024	The Voice UK	Coach with Tom Fletcher; series 13 and 14
2024	I'm a Celebrity...Get Me Out of Here!	Series 24; Contestant; Winner

=== Film ===
Year	Title	Notes
2006	Just My Luck	With McFly

=== Event appearances ===
Year	Title	Notes
2006	T4 on the Beach	With McFly
2007	T4 on the Beach	With McFly
2007	Nickelodeon UK Kids Choice Awards	With McFly
2008	T4 on the Beach	With McFly

== Awards ==
(For awards won with McFly, see: McFly Awards)

2004

- Smash Hits Awards – "Most Fanciable Male"

2005

- Smash Hits Awards – "Most Snoggable Male"

2024

- Winner of The fifth series of the masked singer as Piranha
- Winner of The 23rd season of I'm a Celebrity..Get Me Out Of Here

Preceded by Sam Thompson	I'm a Celebrity... Get Me Out of Here! Winner & King of the Jungle; 2024	Succeeded by Angryginge
