= List of UK top-ten singles in 2004 =

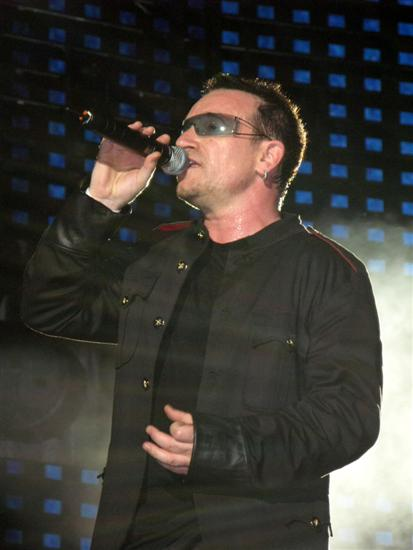
Bono of the band U2 was part of the Band Aid 20 collective, who recorded the best-selling single of 2004, "Do They Know It's Christmas?". The song spent four weeks at the top of the chart from 11 December 2004.

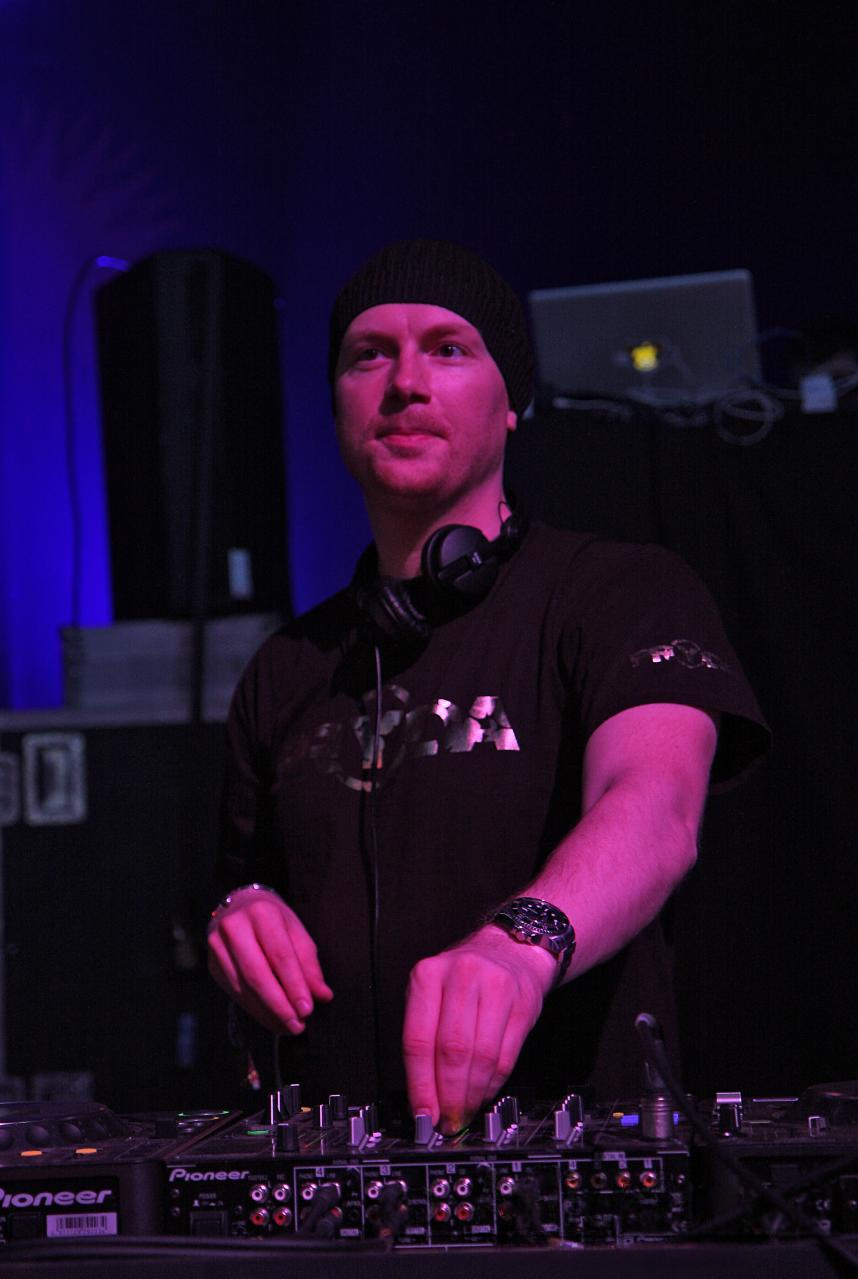
Swedish DJ Eric Prydz took his dance track "Call on Me" to number-one for a total of five weeks. It was ranked as the fourth best-selling song of the year.

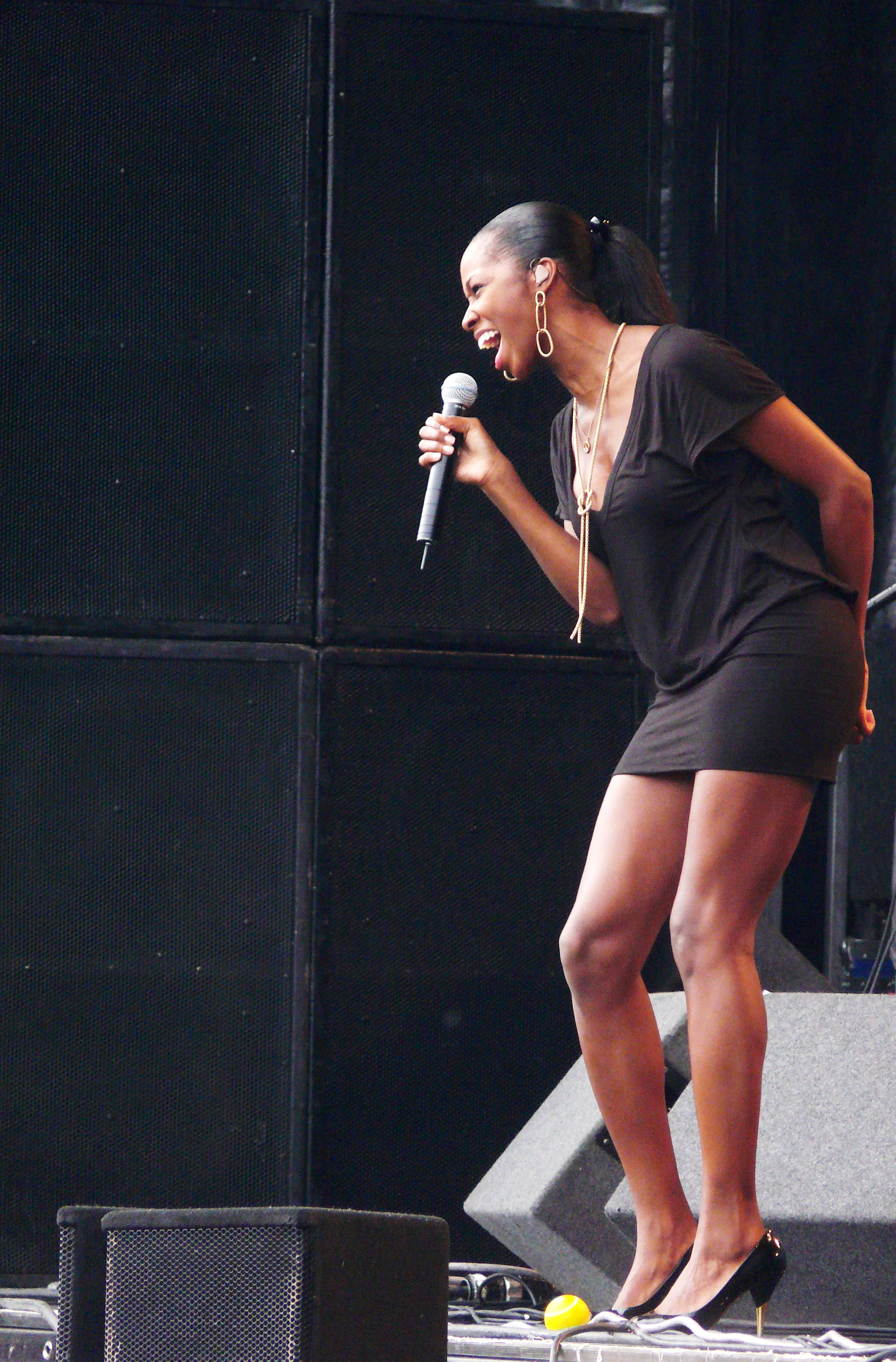
Jamelia's biggest hit of her four top ten's (other than her Band Aid 20 appearance) was the number 2 single "Thank You". Two other singles reached the top 10: "See It in a Boy's Eyes" (5) and "DJ"/"Stop" (9).

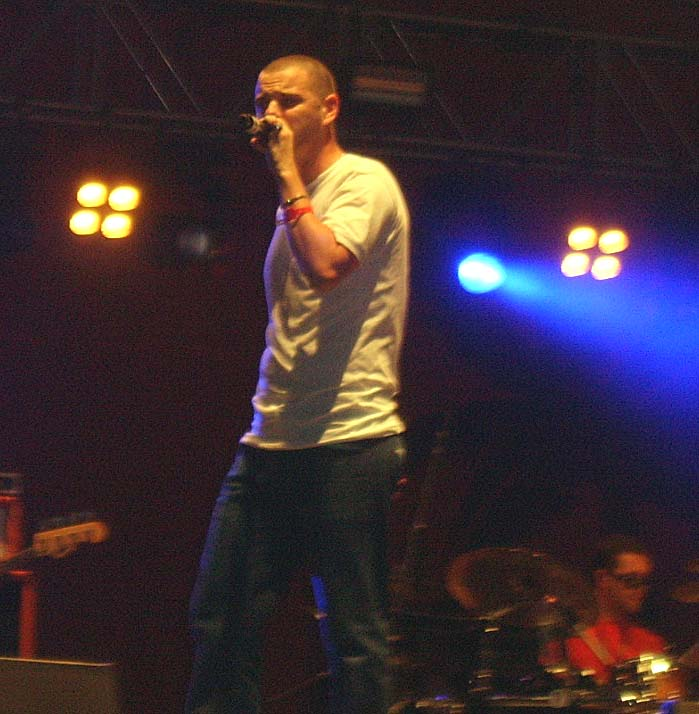
"Dry Your Eyes" was a number-one single for new artist The Streets from Birmingham. His other single "Fit but You Know It" ranked at number four.

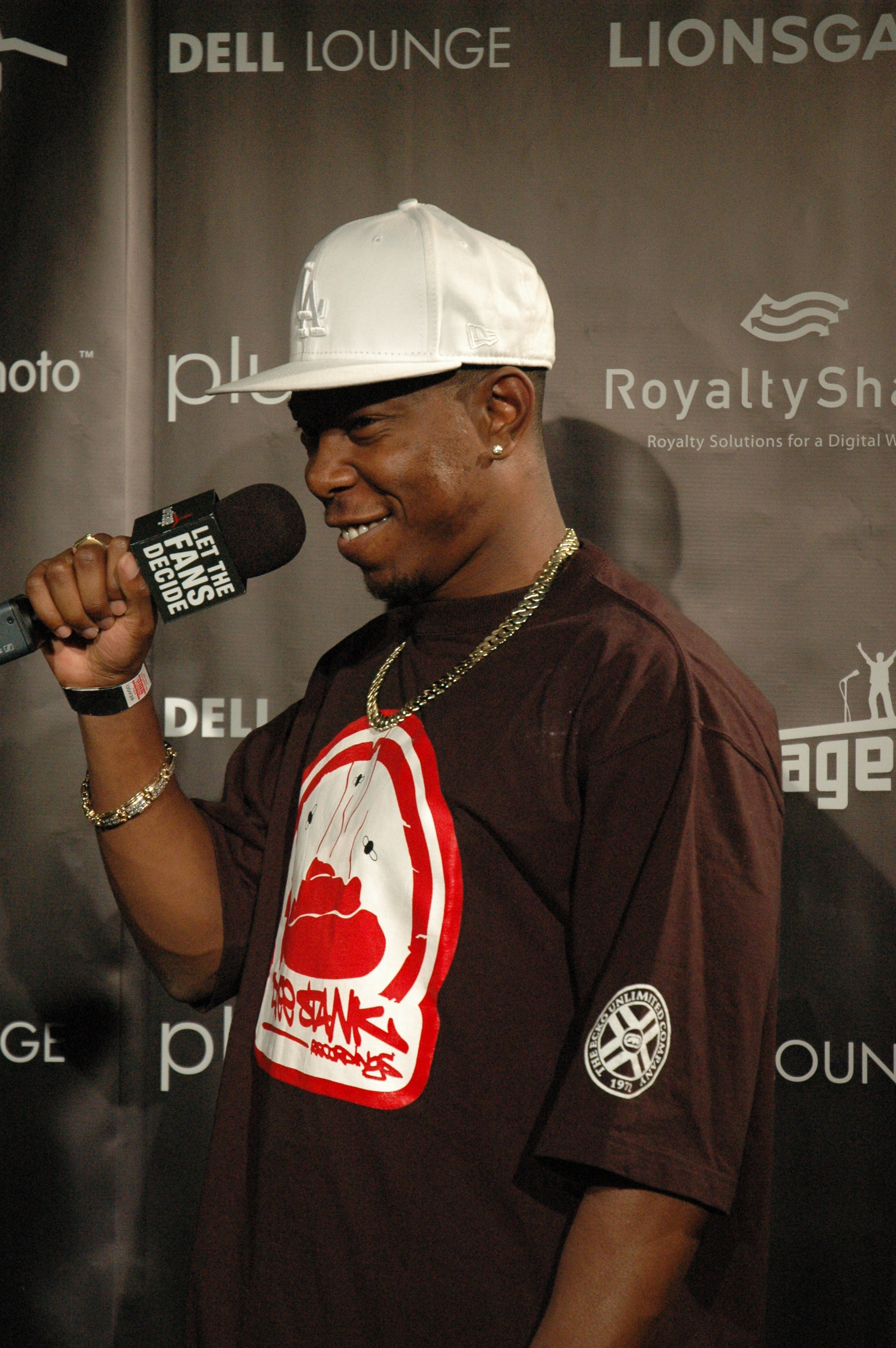
Dizzee Rascal was a featured act on the Band Aid 20 single, and also reached number 10 with his song "Stand Up Tall".

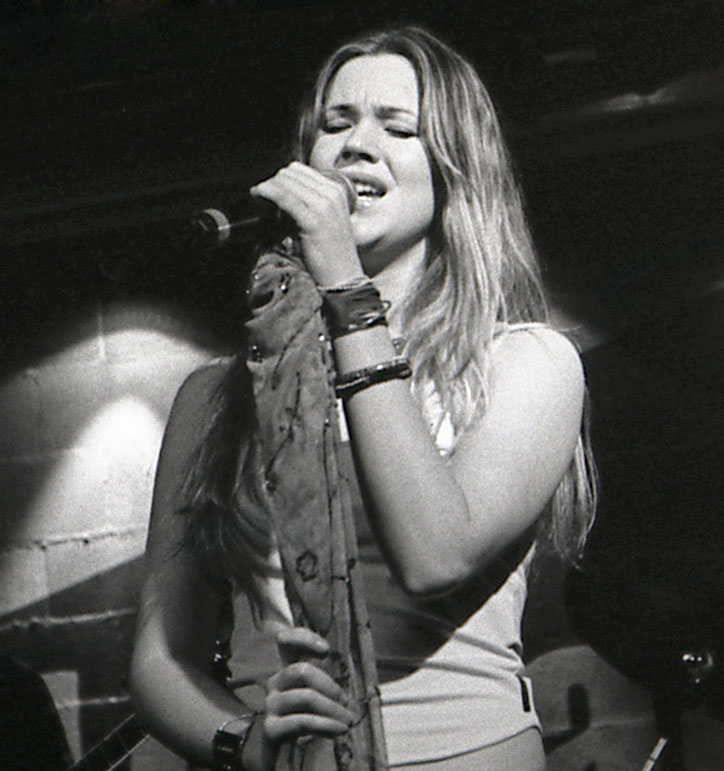
Joss Stone was another artist with the Band Aid single in her discography. She added to this with her first solo top 10 "You Had Me".

The UK Singles Chart is one of many music charts compiled by the Official Charts Company that calculates the best-selling singles of the week in the United Kingdom. Since 2004 the chart has been based on the sales of both physical singles and digital downloads, with airplay figures excluded from the official chart. This list shows singles that peaked in the Top 10 of the UK Singles Chart during 2004, as well as singles which peaked in 2003 but were in the top 10 in 2004. The entry date is when the song appeared in the top 10 for the first time (week ending, as published by the Official Charts Company, which is six days after the chart is announced).

Two hundred and ten singles were in the top ten in 2004. Ten singles from 2003 remained in the top 10 for several weeks at the beginning of the year. Hey Ya! by Outkast was the only single from 2003 to reach its peak in 2004. Sixty-five artists scored multiple entries in the top 10 in 2004. Dizzee Rascal, Kanye West, Kasabian, Maroon 5 and Snow Patrol were among the many artists who achieved their first UK charting top 10 single in 2004.

The 2003 Christmas number-one, "Mad World" by Michael Andrews featuring Gary Jules (which was recorded for the 2001 film Donnie Darko), remained at number-one for the first week of 2004. The first new number-one single of the year was "All This Time" by 2003 Pop Idol winner Michelle McManus. The release sent McManus into the Guinness Book of Records as the first Scottish female to reach the top of the charts with their debut single. Overall, thirty different singles peaked at number-one in 2004, with Busted (3) having the most singles (including their appearance on Band Aid 20's "Do They Know It's Christmas?") hit that position.

== Background ==
=== Multiple entries ===
Two hundred and ten singles charted in the top 10 in 2004, with 200 singles reaching their peak this year (including the re-entry "Mysterious Girl" which charted in previous years but reached a peak on its latest chart run).

Sixty-six artists scored multiple entries in the top 10 in 2004. Pete Doherty had the most top 10 entries in 2004 with five. This included one solo hit ("For Lovers), one entry with Babyshambles ("Killamangiro"), and three entries with The Libertines ("Can't Stand Me Now, "What Became of the Likely Lads" and "Born in England" as part of Twisted X, supporting England ahead of UEFA Euro 2004).

Thirteen artists recorded four or more top 10 singles across the course of 2004. Of these, seven artists totals included an appearance on the Band Aid 20 charity single, which reached number-one. Two of Busted's other three singles in 2004 also peaked at the top spot, with "Who's David" and ""Thunderbirds"/"3AM"" both landing the coveted position. "Air Hostess" just missed out, reaching number-two in May. Jamelia's biggest solo hit of the year was "Thank You" which lost out on number-one to Peter Andre's "Mysterious Girl" in March. She scored two further top tens with "See It In A Boy's Eyes" (5) in July and double-A side "DJ"/"Stop" (9) in November.

Natasha Bedingfield began to catch up with her brother Daniel's chart success with three top ten entries on top of the Band Aid hit. Her debut song "Single" peaked at number three in May, "These Words" topped the charts in August, and she finished off her year with number 6 single "Unwritten" in December. Tom Chaplin and Tim Rice-Oxley had a breakout year with their band Keane. Their iconic song "Somewhere Only We Know" started things off, reaching a high of number-three in February. Three months later, "Everybody's Changing landed one spot lower at number-four in the chart. In August, "Bedshaped" capped off their year entering at number-ten before they both featured on "Do They Know It's Christmas?".

The winner of the first series of Pop Idol, Will Young's "Leave Right Now" carried on its chart run from 2003, having peaked at number-one in December. His first new entry of the year, "Your Game", reached number-three in March. "Friday's Child" took fourth position in the chart in July. Girl group Sugababes had three additional top 10 singles in 2004, including "Too Lost in You" from the end of the previous year. "Caught in a Moment" and "In the Middle" both reached number eight.

Six further acts reached the top 10 with four entries this year. Andre 3000 of the American group OutKast had three hits with his band and one guest spot. "Hey Ya!", first released in 2003, finally peaked at number three in February. "The Way You Move" reached number 7 in April and "Roses" got to number four in July. He also collaborated with Kelis on the number three hit "Millionaire" in October. Kelis herself had two solo hits in 2004, as well as featuring on Enrique Iglesias single "Not In Love", which peaked at number five. "Milkshake" took second spot behind "All This Time" by Michelle McManus in January and "Trick Me" reached the same position in June.

Duncan James from the band Blue reached number two with his debut solo single "I Believe My Heart" (featuring Keedie) and had three top 10 hits with the band: "Breathe Easy", "Bubblin' and "Curtain Falls". McFly's first single, "5 Colours in Her Hair" reached number-one, while follow-ups "Obviously", "That Girl", "Room on the 3rd Floor" all made the top 10.

Morrissey scored four hit singles in 2004: "Irish Blood, English Heart, "First of the Gang to Die", "Let Me Kiss You", "I Have Forgiven Jesus". The Libertines had two hit singles in their own right, "Can't Stand Me Now" and "What Became of the Likely Lads", as well as the Twisted X song "Born in England".

Ronan Keating narrowly missed out on a number-one in 2004, with three singles reaching number two: "She Believes in Me", "I Hope You Dance" and "Father and Son". A fourth single, "Last Thing on My Mind" peaked at number five.

Usher was one of a number of artists with three top-ten entries, including the number one singles "Yeah!" and "Burn". Bono, Justin Hawkins, Lemar, Rachel Stevens and Robbie Williams all featured on the Band Aid single. Christina Aguilera, Britney Spears, Eminem, Girls Aloud, Kanye West, Kylie Minogue and R. Kelly were among the artists who had multiple top 10 entries in 2004.

=== Chart debuts ===
Eighty-two artists achieved their first top 10 single in 2004, either as a lead or featured artist. This includes the charity group Band Aid 20 (made up of chart acts but charting together for the first time). Of these, eleven went on to record another hit single that year: 2Play, The 411, Boogie Pimps, Deepest Blue, Dizzee Rascal, Jay Sean, Joss Stone, Maroon 5, Naila Boss, Twista and V. Four artists scored two more top 10 singles in 2004: Franz Ferdinand, Keane, Raghav and The Streets. McFly and Natasha Bedingfield both had three other entries in their breakthrough year.

The following table (collapsed on desktop site) does not include acts who had previously charted as part of a group and secured their first top 10 solo single.

Artist	Number of top 10s	First entry	Chart position	Other entries
Alistair Griffin	1	"Bring It On"/"My Lover's Prayer"	5	—
Boogie Pimps	2	"Somebody to Love"	3	"Sunny" (10)
Franz Ferdinand	3	"Take Me Out"	3	"Matinee" (8), "This Fire" (8)
2Play	2	"So Confused"	6	"It Can't Be Right" (8)
Raghav	3	"So Confused"	6	"Can't Get Enough" (10), "It Can't Be Right" (8)
Jucxi	1	"So Confused"	6	—
Scissor Sisters	1	"Comfortably Numb"	10	—
LMC	1	"Take Me to the Clouds Above"	1	—
Snow Patrol	1	"Run"	5	—
Lostprophets	1	"Last Train Home"	8	—
Sam & Mark	1	"With a Little Help from My Friends"	1	—
Keane	3	"Somewhere Only We Know"	3	"Bedshaped" (10), "Do They Know It's Christmas?" (1), "Everybody's Changing" (4)
Deepest Blue	2	"Deepest Blue"	7	"Give It Away" (9)
Iceberg Slimm	1	"Can't Get Enough"	10	—
VS	1	"Love You Like Mad"	7	—
DJ Casper	1	"Cha Cha Slide"	1	—
N.E.R.D.	1	"She Wants to Move"	5	—
Kanye West	3	"Through the Wire"	9	"All Falls Down" (10), "Talk About Our Love" (6)
Twista	2	"Slow Jamz"	3	"Sunshine" (3)
Sleepy Brown	1	"The Way You Move"	7	—
McFly	4	"5 Colours in Her Hair"	1	"Obviously", "That Girl", "Room on the 3rd Floor"
The Rasmus	1	"In the Shadows"	3	—
Special D	1	"Come with Me"	6	—
Narcotic Thrust	1	"I Like It"	9	—
Eamon	1	"F**k It (I Don't Want You Back)"	1	—
Wolfman	1	"For Lovers"	7	—
Maroon 5	2	"This Love"	3	"She Will Be Loved" (4)
The Streets	3	"Fit but You Know It"	4	"Blinded by the Lights" (10), "Dry Your Eyes" (1)
HIM	1	"Solitary Man"	9	—
Natasha Bedingfield	3	"Single"	3	"These Words" (3), "Unwritten" (6)
Frankee	1	"F.U.R.B. (F U Right Back)"	1	—
Naila Boss	2	"It Can't Be Right"	8	"You Should Really Know" (8)
Cassidy	1	"Hotel"	3	—
The 411	2	"On My Knees"	4	"Dumb" (3)
V	2	"Blood, Sweat and Tears"	6	"Hip to Hip"/"Can You Feel It?" (5)
Kristian Leontiou	1	"Story of My Life"	9	—
The Killers	1	"Mr. Brightside"	10	"Somebody Told Me" (3)
Mario Winans	1	"I Don't Wanna Know"	1	—
SFX Boys Choir	1	"All Together Now"	5	—
4-4-2	1	"Come On England"	2	—
O-Zone	1	"Dragostea Din Tei"	3	—
Twisted X	1	"Born in England"	9	—
Bernard Butler	1	"Born in England"	9	—
The Delays	1	"Born in England"	9	—
James Nesbitt	1	"Born in England"	9	—
Syleena Johnson	1	"All Falls Down"	10	—
Razorlight	1	"Golden Touch"	9	—
Jay Sean	2	"Eyes on You"	6	"Stolen" (4)
Rishi Rich Project	1	"Eyes on You"	6	—
Girls of FHM	1	"Da Ya Think I'm Sexy?"	10	—
Nina Sky	1	"Move Ya Body"	6	—
Shapeshifters	1	"Lola's Theme"	1	—
J-Kwon	1	"Tipsy"	2	—
Ana Johnsson	1	"We Are"	8	—
3 of a Kind	1	"Baby Cakes"	1	—
Kasabian	1	L.S.F.	10	—
Goldie Lookin Chain	1	"Guns Don't Kill People, Rappers Do"	3	—
Stonebridge	1	"Put 'Em High"	6	—
Therese	1	"Put 'Em High"	6	—
Emma Lanford	1	"Is It 'Cos I'm Cool"	9	—
Dizzee Rascal	2	"Stand Up Tall"	10	"Do They Know It's Christmas?"
JoJo	1	"Leave (Get Out)"	2	"Baby It's You" (8)
Pirates (The)	1	"You Should Really Know"	8	—
Ishani	1	"You Should Really Know"	8	—
Eric Prydz	1	"Call on Me"	1	—
Joss Stone	2	"You Had Me"	9	"Do They Know It's Christmas?" (1)
Deep Dish	1	"Flashdance"	3	—
Ashlee Simpson	1	"Pieces of Me"	4	—
Khia	1	"My Neck, My Back (Lick It)"	4	—
Lucie Silvas	1	"What You're Made Of"	7	—
Angel City	1	"Do You Know (I Go Crazy)"	8	—
Joe Budden	1	"Whatever U Want"	9	—
Keedie	1	"I Believe My Heart"	2	—
Rooster	1	"Come Get Some"	7	—
Michael Gray	1	"The Weekend"	7	—
Ice Cube	1	"You Can Do It"	2	—
Mack 10	1	"You Can Do It"	2	—
Ms. Toi	1	"You Can Do It"	2	—
Babyshambles	1	"Killamangiro"	8	—
Band Aid 20	1	"Do They Know It's Christmas?"	1	—
Estelle	1	"Do They Know It's Christmas?"	1	—
The Thrills	1	"Do They Know It's Christmas?"	1	—

Notes

Michelle debuted at number-one with "All This Time" in January, but her first chart credit was with her fellow Pop Idol series 2 finalists on "Happy Xmas (War is Over)" at the end of 2003. This also included Sam and Mark, whose single "With a Little Help from My Friends"/"Measure of a Man" marked their debut as a duo.

Twisted X was a supergroup created by the radio station XFM. The song "Born in England" featured several artists who had previously appeared in the UK top 10 (Supergrass and The Libertines) as well as several debutants (James Nesbitt, Bernard Butler and The Delays). Duncan James from Blue debuted with a solo single in 2004, "I Believe My Heart", which was recorded as a duet with Keedie. Another former boyband member - Brian McFadden of Westlife - reached number-one with his first solo single, "Real to Me", while a second song "Irish Son" entered at number 6.

Band Aid 20 was a new iteration of the original Band Aid and Band Aid II supergroups, recording a new version of "Do They Know It's Christmas?" in aid of crisis in Darfur, Sudan. Shaznay Lewis, formerly of All Saints, peaked at number 8 with her debut solo single "Never Felt Like This Before". She also performed on the Band Aid 20 single. Róisín Murphy had appeared in the chart before with Moloko but she featured on "Do They Know It's Christmas?" in her own right. Tom Hannon (of The Divine Comedy), Coldplay's Chris Martin, Tim Wheeler (Ash) and Tim Rice-Oxley and Tom Chaplin (both from the band Keane) had similarly charted with their groups before Band Aid 20.

=== Songs from films ===
Original songs from various films entered the top 10 throughout the year. These included "Thunderbirds" (from Thunderbirds), "We Are" (Spider-Man 2), "Car Wash" (Shark Tale) and "Misunderstood" (Bridget Jones: The Edge of Reason).

=== Charity singles ===
A number of singles recorded for charity reached the top 10 in the charts in 2004. The Sport Relief single was "Some Girls" by former S Club 7 member Rachel Stevens, peaking at number two on 24 July 2004.

Girls Aloud recorded the Children in Need single for 2004, a cover of The Pretenders song "I'll Stand by You". It was their seventh successive top 10 single and reached number-one on 27 November 2004.

A group of artists came together under the banner of Band Aid 20 and released the single "Do They Know It's Christmas?" in aid of the Darfur region of Sudan. It was the third version of the song to hit the charts after Band Aid and Band Aid II in the 1980s. The song featured artists including Bono, Busted, Daniel Bedingfield, Jamelia and Paul McCartney. It was the Christmas number-one single for 2004, topping the chart for four weeks from 11 December 2004.

=== Best-selling singles ===
Band Aid 20 had the best-selling single of the year with "Do They Know It's Christmas?". The song spent six weeks in the top 10 (including four weeks at number one), sold over 1.06 million copies and was certified platinum by the BPI. "F**k It (I Don't Want You Back)" by Eamon came in second place, selling more than 552,000 copies and losing out by around 454,000 sales. DJ Casper's "Cha Cha Slide", "Call on Me" from Eric Prydz and "Yeah!" by Usher featuring Lil Jon and Ludacris made up the top five. Singles by Michelle McManus, Anastacia, Peter Andre featuring Bubbler Ranx, Britney Spears and Frankee (a response song to Eamon called "F.U.R.B. (Fuck You Right Back)") were also in the top ten best-selling singles of the year.

"Do They Know It's Christmas?" (6) was also ranked in the top 10 best-selling singles of the decade.

== Top-ten singles ==
Symbol	Meaning
‡	Single peaked in 2003 but still in chart in 2004.
(#)	Year-end top-ten single position and rank.
Entered	The date that the single first appeared in the chart.
Peak	Highest position that the single reached in the UK Singles Chart.

Entered (week ending)	Weeks in top 10	Single	Artist	Peak	Peak reached (week ending)	Weeks at peak
Singles in 2003
22 November 2003	12	"Hey Ya!" ^{[A]}	Outkast	3	14 February 2004	1
6 December 2003	7	"Leave Right Now" ‡	Will Young	1	6 December 2003	2
6 December 2003	6	"I'm Your Man" ‡	Shane Richie	2	6 December 2003	1
13 December 2003	7	"Shut Up" ‡	Black Eyed Peas	2	13 December 2003	1
20 December 2003	7	"Changes" ‡	Ozzy & Kelly Osbourne	1	20 December 2003	1
27 December 2003	6	"Mad World" ‡	Michael Andrews featuring Gary Jules	1	27 December 2003	3
27 December 2003	3	"Christmas Time (Don't Let the Bells End)" ‡	The Darkness	2	27 December 2003	1
27 December 2003	2	"Proper Crimbo" ‡	Bo' Selecta!	4	27 December 2003	2
27 December 2003	2	"Happy Xmas (War Is Over)" ‡	The Idols	5	27 December 2003	1
27 December 2003	3	"Ladies' Night" ‡	Atomic Kitten featuring Kool & the Gang	8	27 December 2003	1
27 December 2003	2	"Too Lost in You" ‡	Sugababes	10	27 December 2003	2
Singles in 2004
10 January 2004	2	"This Groove"/"Let Your Head Go"	Victoria Beckham	3	10 January 2004	1
10 January 2004	1	"Bring It On"/"My Lover's Prayer"	Alistair Griffin	5	10 January 2004	1
10 January 2004	1	"I Won't Change You"	Sophie Ellis-Bextor	9	10 January 2004	1
17 January 2004	6	"All This Time" (#6)	Michelle	1	17 January 2004	3
17 January 2004	7	"Milkshake"	Kelis	2	24 January 2004	4
17 January 2004	7	"Somebody to Love"	Boogie Pimps	3	31 January 2004	1
17 January 2004	5	"I'm Still in Love with You"	Sean Paul featuring Sasha	6	17 January 2004	1
24 January 2004	2	"Take Me Out"	Franz Ferdinand	3	24 January 2004	1
24 January 2004	5	"So Confused"	2Play featuring Raghav & Jucxi	6	31 January 2004	1
31 January 2004	1	"Comfortably Numb"	Scissor Sisters	10	31 January 2004	1
7 February 2004	5	"Take Me to the Clouds Above"	LMC vs. U2	1	7 February 2004	2
7 February 2004	2	"Run"	Snow Patrol	5	7 February 2004	1
7 February 2004	2	"I'll Be There"	Emma Bunton	7	7 February 2004	1
7 February 2004	1	"Last Train Home"	Lostprophets	8	7 February 2004	1
14 February 2004	1	"Here 4 One"	Blazin' Squad	6	14 February 2004	1
21 February 2004	2	"With a Little Help from My Friends"	Sam & Mark	1	21 February 2004	1
21 February 2004	2	"She Believes (In Me)"	Ronan Keating	2	21 February 2004	1
21 February 2004	1	"Moviestar"	Stereophonics	5	21 February 2004	1
21 February 2004	1	"It Takes Scoop"	Fatman Scoop	9	21 February 2004	1
28 February 2004	2	"Who's David"	Busted	1	28 February 2004	1
28 February 2004	2	"Somewhere Only We Know"	Keane	3	28 February 2004	1
28 February 2004	1	"Give It Away"	Deepest Blue	9	28 February 2004	1
28 February 2004	1	"Can't Get Enough"	Raghav featuring Iceberg Slimm	10	28 February 2004	1
6 March 2004	4	"Mysterious Girl" (#8) ^{[B]}	Peter Andre featuring Bubbler Ranx	1	6 March 2004	1
6 March 2004	4	"Thank You"	Jamelia	2	6 March 2004	1
6 March 2004	2	"Obvious"	Westlife	3	6 March 2004	1
6 March 2004	1	"Love You Like Mad"	VS	7	6 March 2004	1
6 March 2004	1	"Another Day"	Lemar	9	6 March 2004	1
6 March 2004	1	"If I Can't"/"Them Thangs"	50 Cent/G-Unit	10	6 March 2004	1
13 March 2004	5	"Toxic" (#9)	Britney Spears	1	13 March 2004	1
13 March 2004	8	"Cha Cha Slide" (#3)	DJ Casper	1	20 March 2004	1
13 March 2004	2	"Amazing"	George Michael	4	13 March 2004	1
13 March 2004	2	"Red Blooded Woman"	Kylie Minogue	5	13 March 2004	1
13 March 2004	2	"Dude"	Beenie Man featuring Ms. Thing	7	13 March 2004	1
13 March 2004	1	"I Miss You"	Blink-182	8	13 March 2004	1
20 March 2004	2	"Baby I Love U!"	Jennifer Lopez	3	20 March 2004	1
20 March 2004	2	"Not In Love"	Enrique Iglesias featuring Kelis	5	20 March 2004	1
20 March 2004	2	"Hey Mama"	Black Eyed Peas	6	20 March 2004	1
27 March 2004	7	"Yeah!" (#5)	Usher featuring Lil Jon & Ludacris	1	27 March 2004	2
27 March 2004	1	"Your Game"	Will Young	3	27 March 2004	1
27 March 2004	2	"She Wants to Move"	N.E.R.D.	5	27 March 2004	1
3 April 2004	11	"Left Outside Alone" (#7)	Anastacia	3	3 April 2004	1
3 April 2004	3	"Breathe Easy"	Blue	4	3 April 2004	1
3 April 2004	1	"Love Is Only a Feeling"	The Darkness	5	3 April 2004	1
3 April 2004	2	"The Way You Move"	Outkast featuring Sleepy Brown	7	3 April 2004	1
3 April 2004	1	"In the Middle"	Sugababes	8	3 April 2004	1
3 April 2004	2	"Through the Wire"	Kanye West	9	3 April 2004	2
10 April 2004	4	"5 Colours in Her Hair"	McFly	1	10 April 2004	2
10 April 2004	3	"Slow Jamz"	Twista featuring Kanye West & Jamie Foxx	3	10 April 2004	1
10 April 2004	1	"Someone like Me"/"Right Now 2004"	Atomic Kitten	8	10 April 2004	1
17 April 2004	7	"In the Shadows"	The Rasmus	3	17 April 2004	2
17 April 2004	2	"Come with Me"	Special D	6	17 April 2004	1
17 April 2004	1	"I Like It"	Narcotic Thrust	9	17 April 2004	1
17 April 2004	1	"Naughty Girl"	Beyoncé	10	17 April 2004	1
24 April 2004	9	"F**k It (I Don't Want You Back)" (#2)	Eamon	1	24 April 2004	4
24 April 2004	4	"My Band"	D12	2	24 April 2004	2
24 April 2004	1	"For Lovers"	Wolfman featuring Pete Doherty	7	24 April 2004	1
1 May 2004	5	"This Love"	Maroon 5	3	1 May 2004	1
1 May 2004	1	"You're Gone"	Marillion	7	1 May 2004	1
1 May 2004	1	"Matinée"	Franz Ferdinand	8	1 May 2004	1
8 May 2004	1	"Air Hostess"	Busted	2	8 May 2004	1
8 May 2004	2	"Fit but You Know It"	The Streets	4	8 May 2004	1
8 May 2004	1	"Solitary Man"	HIM	9	8 May 2004	1
8 May 2004	1	"Sunny"	Boogie Pimps	10	8 May 2004	1
15 May 2004	4	"Dip It Low"	Christina Milian	2	15 May 2004	1
15 May 2004	2	"Single"	Natasha Bedingfield	3	15 May 2004	1
15 May 2004	1	"Everybody's Changing"	Keane	4	15 May 2004	1
15 May 2004	1	"Last Thing on My Mind"	Ronan Keating & LeAnn Rimes	5	15 May 2004	1
22 May 2004	6	"F.U.R.B. (F U Right Back)" (#10)	Frankee	1	22 May 2004	3
22 May 2004	1	"Irish Blood, English Heart"	Morrissey	3	22 May 2004	1
22 May 2004	2	"Don't Tell Me"	Avril Lavigne	5	22 May 2004	1
22 May 2004	1	"It Can't Be Right"	2Play featuring Raghav & Naila Boss	8	22 May 2004	1
29 May 2004	5	"Hotel"	Cassidy featuring R. Kelly	3	29 May 2004	1
29 May 2004	2	"On My Knees"	The 411 featuring Ghostface Killah	4	29 May 2004	1
29 May 2004	1	"Summer Sunshine"	The Corrs	6	29 May 2004	1
5 June 2004	5	"Trick Me"	Kelis	2	5 June 2004	1
5 June 2004	1	"Blood, Sweat and Tears"	V	6	5 June 2004	1
5 June 2004	1	"Story of My Life"	Kristian Leontiou	9	5 June 2004	1
5 June 2004	1	"Mr. Brightside"	The Killers	10	5 June 2004	1
12 June 2004	7	"I Don't Wanna Know"	Mario Winans featuring Enya & P. Diddy	1	12 June 2004	2
12 June 2004	1	"Insania"	Peter Andre	3	12 June 2004	1
12 June 2004	1	"Mass Destruction"	Faithless	7	12 June 2004	1
12 June 2004	1	"Ch-Check It Out"	Beastie Boys	8	12 June 2004	1
12 June 2004	2	"Euro 2004 (All Together Now)"	The Farm featuring S.F.X. Boys Choir	5	19 June 2004	1
19 June 2004	3	"Come On England"	4-4-2	2	19 June 2004	1
19 June 2004	9	"Dragostea Din Tei"	O-Zone	3	19 June 2004	1
19 June 2004	1	"Born in England"	Twisted X	9	19 June 2004	1
19 June 2004	1	"All Falls Down"	Kanye West featuring Syleena Johnson	10	19 June 2004	1
26 June 2004	7	"Everytime"	Britney Spears	1	26 June 2004	1
26 June 2004	1	"Talk About Our Love"	Brandy featuring Kanye West	6	26 June 2004	1
26 June 2004	1	"With You"	Jessica Simpson	7	26 June 2004	1
26 June 2004	1	"Golden Touch"	Razorlight	9	26 June 2004	1
3 July 2004	3	"Obviously"	McFly	1	3 July 2004	1
3 July 2004	2	"Roses"	Outkast	4	3 July 2004	1
3 July 2004	1	"Eyes on You"	Jay Sean featuring Rishi Rich Project	6	3 July 2004	1
3 July 2004	1	"Come as You Are"	Beverley Knight	9	3 July 2004	1
3 July 2004	1	"Da Ya Think I'm Sexy?"	Girls of FHM	10	3 July 2004	1
10 July 2004	5	"Burn"	Usher	1	10 July 2004	2
10 July 2004	2	"The Show"	Girls Aloud	2	10 July 2004	1
10 July 2004	1	"Chocolate"	Kylie Minogue	6	10 July 2004	1
10 July 2004	1	"Flawless (Go to the City)"	George Michael	8	10 July 2004	1
10 July 2004	1	"Bubblin'"	Blue	9	10 July 2004	1
17 July 2004	1	"That's All Right"	Elvis Presley	3	17 July 2004	1
17 July 2004	1	"Friday's Child"	Will Young	4	17 July 2004	1
17 July 2004	3	"Move Ya Body"	Nina Sky featuring Jabba	6	17 July 2004	1
17 July 2004	1	"Never Felt Like This Before"	Shaznay Lewis	8	17 July 2004	1
24 July 2004	6	"Lola's Theme"	The Shapeshifters	1	24 July 2004	1
24 July 2004	4	"Some Girls" ^{[C]}	Rachel Stevens	2	24 July 2004	1
24 July 2004	4	"Tipsy"	J-Kwon	4	24 July 2004	2
24 July 2004	3	"See It in a Boy's Eyes"	Jamelia	5	24 July 2004	1
24 July 2004	1	"First of the Gang to Die"	Morrissey	6	24 July 2004	1
31 July 2004	6	"Dry Your Eyes"	The Streets	1	31 July 2004	1
31 July 2004	1	"Satellite of Love '04"	Lou Reed	10	31 July 2004	1
7 August 2004	5	"Thunderbirds"/"3AM"	Busted	1	7 August 2004	2
7 August 2004	3	"How Come"	D12	4	7 August 2004	1
14 August 2004	3	"Sick and Tired"	Anastacia	4	14 August 2004	1
14 August 2004	3	"My Happy Ending"	Avril Lavigne	5	14 August 2004	1
14 August 2004	1	"We Are"	Ana Johnsson	8	14 August 2004	1
21 August 2004	7	"Baby Cakes"	3 of a Kind	1	21 August 2004	1
21 August 2004	1	"Can't Stand Me Now"	The Libertines	2	21 August 2004	1
21 August 2004	1	"Hip to Hip"/"Can You Feel It?"	V	5	21 August 2004	1
21 August 2004	1	"L.S.F."	Kasabian	10	21 August 2004	1
28 August 2004	5	"These Words"	Natasha Bedingfield	1	28 August 2004	2
28 August 2004	3	"Guns Don't Kill People, Rappers Do"	Goldie Lookin Chain	3	28 August 2004	1
28 August 2004	1	"Put 'Em High"	StoneBridge featuring Therese	6	28 August 2004	1
28 August 2004	1	"Bedshaped"	Keane	10	28 August 2004	1
4 September 2004	3	"Dumb"	The 411	3	4 September 2004	1
4 September 2004	3	"She Will Be Loved"	Maroon 5	4	4 September 2004	1
4 September 2004	1	"Caught in a Moment"	Sugababes	8	4 September 2004	1
4 September 2004	1	"Is It 'Cos I'm Cool"	Mousse T. featuring Emma Lanford	9	4 September 2004	1
4 September 2004	1	"Stand Up Tall"	Dizzee Rascal	10	4 September 2004	1
11 September 2004	5	"My Place"/"Flap Your Wings"	Nelly	1	11 September 2004	1
11 September 2004	5	"Leave (Get Out)"	JoJo	2	11 September 2004	1
11 September 2004	4	"Sunshine"	Twista featuring Anthony Hamilton	3	11 September 2004	1
11 September 2004	1	"Gravity"	Embrace	7	11 September 2004	1
11 September 2004	2	"You Should Really Know"	The Pirates featuring Enya, Shola Ama, Naila Boss & Ishani	8	11 September 2004	1
18 September 2004	3	"Real to Me"	Brian McFadden	1	18 September 2004	1
18 September 2004	2	"That Girl"	McFly	3	18 September 2004	1
25 September 2004	9	"Call on Me" (#4) ^{[D]}	Eric Prydz	1	25 September 2004	5
25 September 2004	3	"Love Machine"	Girls Aloud	2	25 September 2004	2
25 September 2004	3	"American Idiot"	Green Day	3	25 September 2004	1
25 September 2004	1	"You Had Me"	Joss Stone	9	25 September 2004	1
2 October 2004	1	"Breeze On By"	Donny Osmond	8	2 October 2004	1
9 October 2004	2	"I Hope You Dance"	Ronan Keating	2	9 October 2004	1
9 October 2004	4	"Flashdance"	Deep Dish	3	9 October 2004	1
9 October 2004	1	"Pieces of Me"	Ashlee Simpson	4	9 October 2004	1
9 October 2004	1	"Leaving New York"	R.E.M.	5	9 October 2004	1
9 October 2004	1	"Blinded by the Lights"	The Streets	10	9 October 2004	1
16 October 2004	3	"Radio"	Robbie Williams	1	16 October 2004	1
16 October 2004	2	"More, More, More"	Rachel Stevens	3	16 October 2004	1
16 October 2004	5	"My Neck, My Back (Lick It)"	Khia	4	16 October 2004	3
16 October 2004	1	"(Reach Up for The) Sunrise"	Duran Duran	5	16 October 2004	1
16 October 2004	1	"What You're Made Of"	Lucie Silvas	7	16 October 2004	1
16 October 2004	2	"Do You Know (I Go Crazy)"	Angel City	8	16 October 2004	2
16 October 2004	1	"Whatever U Want"	Christina Milian featuring Joe Budden	9	16 October 2004	1
23 October 2004	3	"I Believe My Heart"	Duncan James & Keedie	2	23 October 2004	1
23 October 2004	1	"Come Get Some"	Rooster	7	23 October 2004	1
23 October 2004	1	"Let Me Kiss You"	Morrissey	8	23 October 2004	1
23 October 2004	1	"Somethin' Is Goin' On"	Cliff Richard	9	23 October 2004	1
30 October 2004	1	"The Love of Richard Nixon"	Manic Street Preachers	2	30 October 2004	1
30 October 2004	2	"Millionaire"	Kelis featuring André 3000	3	30 October 2004	1
30 October 2004	2	"Happy People"/"U Saved Me"	R. Kelly	6	30 October 2004	1
30 October 2004	1	"Enjoy the Silence '04"	Depeche Mode	7	30 October 2004	1
30 October 2004	1	"Kinda Love"	Darius	8	30 October 2004	1
6 November 2004	2	"Wonderful"	Ja Rule featuring R. Kelly & Ashanti	1	6 November 2004	1
6 November 2004	1	"Nothing Hurts Like Love"	Daniel Bedingfield	3	6 November 2004	1
6 November 2004	1	"Stolen"	Jay Sean	4	6 November 2004	1
6 November 2004	1	"You Won't Forget About Me"	Dannii Minogue vs. Flower Power	7	6 November 2004	1
6 November 2004	1	"What Became of the Likely Lads"	The Libertines	9	6 November 2004	1
13 November 2004	4	"Just Lose It"	Eminem	1	13 November 2004	1
13 November 2004	7	"Lose My Breath"	Destiny's Child	2	13 November 2004	4
13 November 2004	2	"My Prerogative"	Britney Spears	3	13 November 2004	1
13 November 2004	3	"Car Wash"	Christina Aguilera featuring Missy Elliott	4	13 November 2004	1
13 November 2004	3	"Confessions Part II"/"My Boo"	Usher^{[E]}	5	13 November 2004	2
13 November 2004	1	"The Weekend"	Michael Gray	7	13 November 2004	1
13 November 2004	1	"DJ"/"Stop!"	Jamelia	9	13 November 2004	2
20 November 2004	2	"Vertigo"	U2	1	20 November 2004	1
20 November 2004	1	"Curtain Falls"	Blue	4	20 November 2004	1
20 November 2004	1	"Out of the Blue"	Delta Goodrem	9	20 November 2004	1
27 November 2004	6	"I'll Stand by You" ^{[F]}	Girls Aloud	1	27 November 2004	2
27 November 2004	7	"If There's Any Justice"	Lemar	3	27 November 2004	2
27 November 2004	2	"What You Waiting For?"	Gwen Stefani	4	27 November 2004	1
27 November 2004	1	"Room on the 3rd Floor"	McFly	5	27 November 2004	1
27 November 2004	2	"Baby It's You"	JoJo featuring Bow Wow	8	27 November 2004	2
4 December 2004	1	"Ride It"	Geri Halliwell	4	4 December 2004	1
4 December 2004	3	"Tilt Ya Head Back"	Nelly & Christina Aguilera	5	4 December 2004	1
4 December 2004	1	"Irish Son"	Brian McFadden	6	4 December 2004	1
4 December 2004	1	"Party for Two"	Shania Twain	10	4 December 2004	1
11 December 2004	6	"Do They Know It's Christmas" (#1) ^{[G]}	Band Aid 20	1	11 December 2004	4
11 December 2004	5	"You Can Do It"	Ice Cube featuring Mack 10 & Ms. Toi	2	11 December 2004	1
11 December 2004	6	"Boulevard of Broken Dreams"	Green Day	5	11 December 2004	1
11 December 2004	4	"Unwritten"	Natasha Bedingfield	6	11 December 2004	1
11 December 2004	1	"Killamangiro"	Babyshambles	8	11 December 2004	1
11 December 2004	1	"Drop It Like It's Hot"	Snoop Dogg featuring Pharrell	10	11 December 2004	1
18 December 2004	4	"I Believe in You"	Kylie Minogue	2	18 December 2004	1
18 December 2004	1	"Misunderstood"	Robbie Williams	8	18 December 2004	1
25 December 2004	3	"Father and Son"	Ronan Keating featuring Yusuf Islam	2	25 December 2004	1
25 December 2004	2	"I Got You Babe"/"Soda Pop"	Bo' Selecta!	5	25 December 2004	1
25 December 2004	1	"I Have Forgiven Jesus"	Morrissey	10	25 December 2004	1

== Entries by artist ==
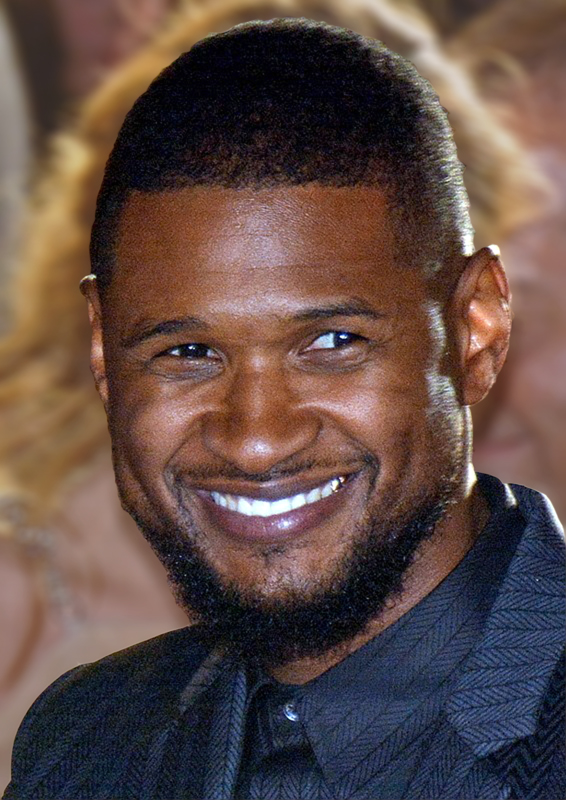
Usher achieved three top 10 singles in 2004, including the number-one hits "Yeah!" and "Burn".

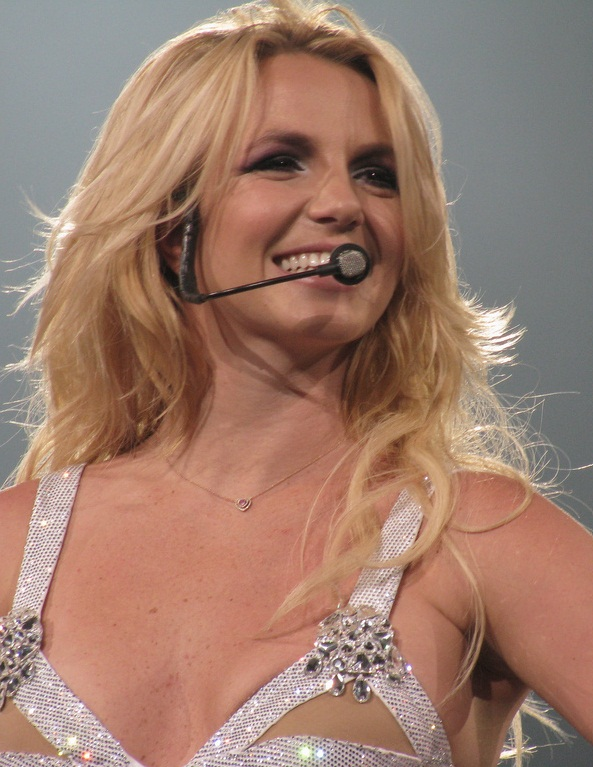
Britney Spears had three more hit singles, two of which went to number-one - "Toxic" and "Everytime". The third, a cover of Bobby Brown's "My Prerogative", reached number three.

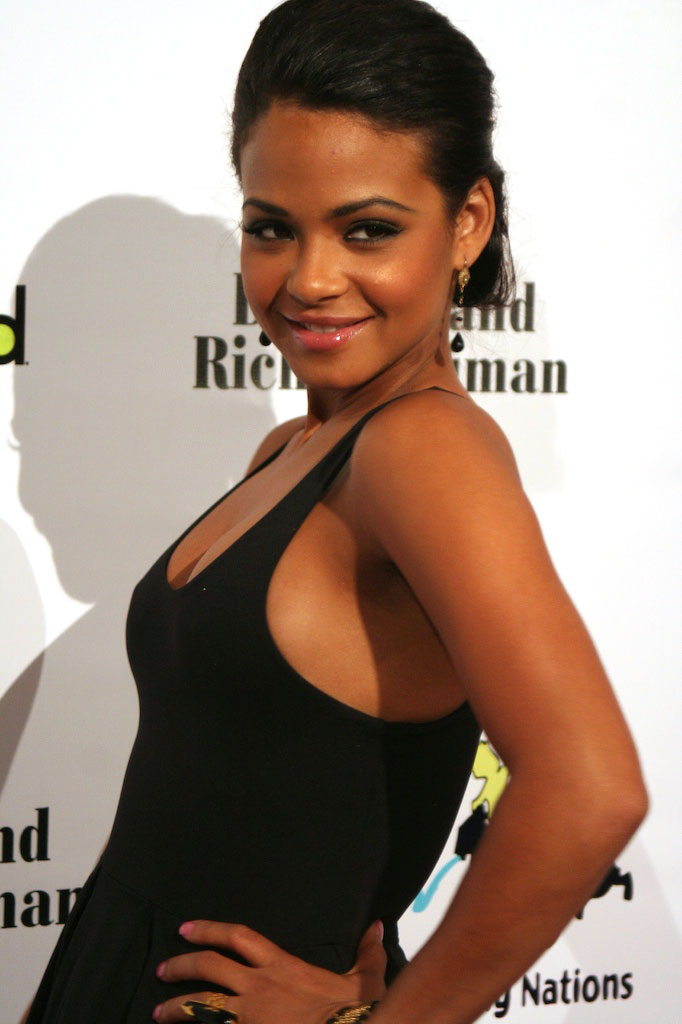
Christina Milian (pictured in 2008) had one solo entry in 2004, the number two-peaking "Dip It Low", as well as "Whatever U Want" featuring "Joe Budden", a number 9 hit.

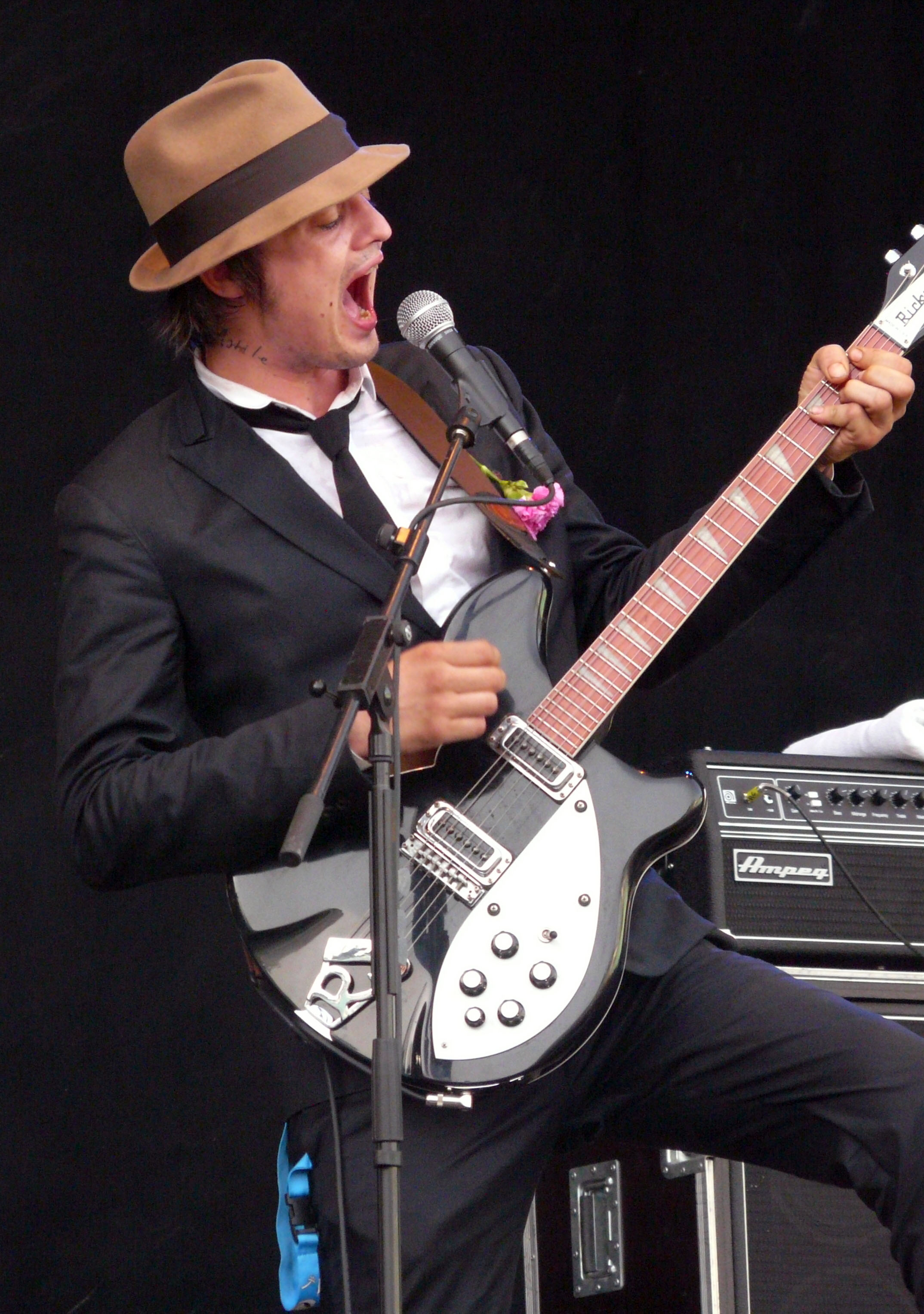
Pete Doherty had five top 10 singles this year. One of these was as a featured artist on Wolfman's "For Lovers". He was also a member of two groups, Babyshambles and The Libertines, with whom he had two top 10 hits each.

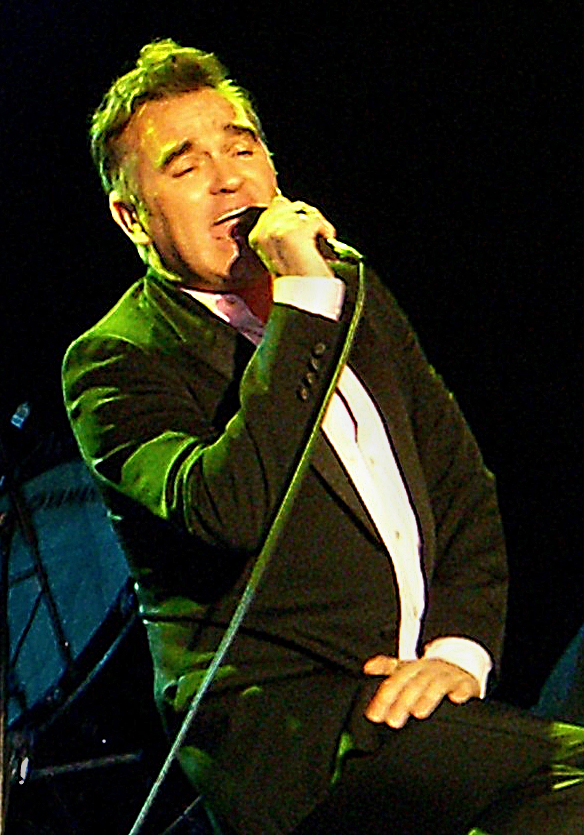
Morrissey took four singles into the top region of the chart: "First of the Gang to Die", "I Have Forgiven Jesus", "Irish Blood, English Heart" and "Let Me Kiss You".

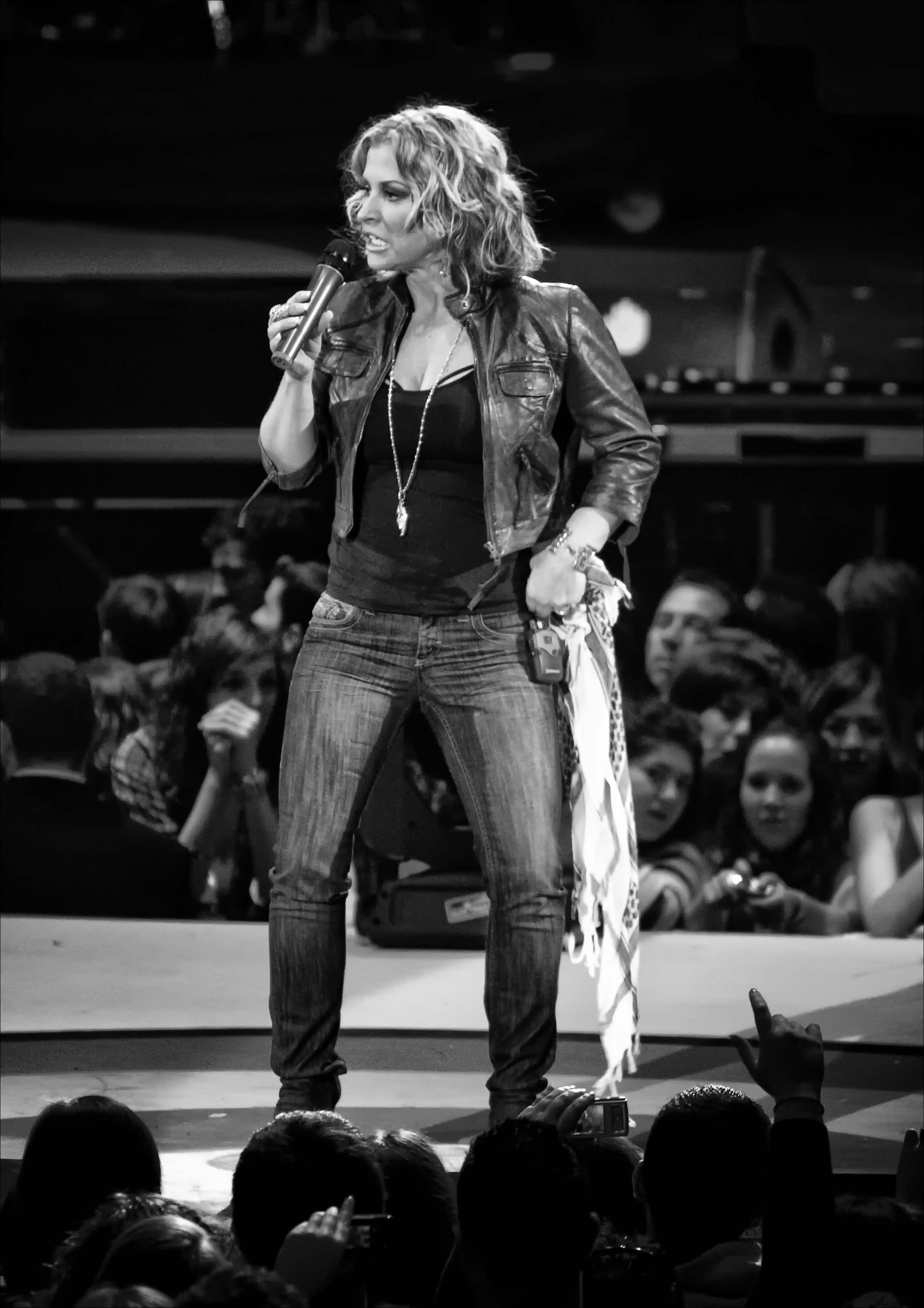
Anastacia scored two more hit singles in the UK in 2004, with "Left Outside Alone" peaked at number 3 and "Sick and Tired" one place lower.

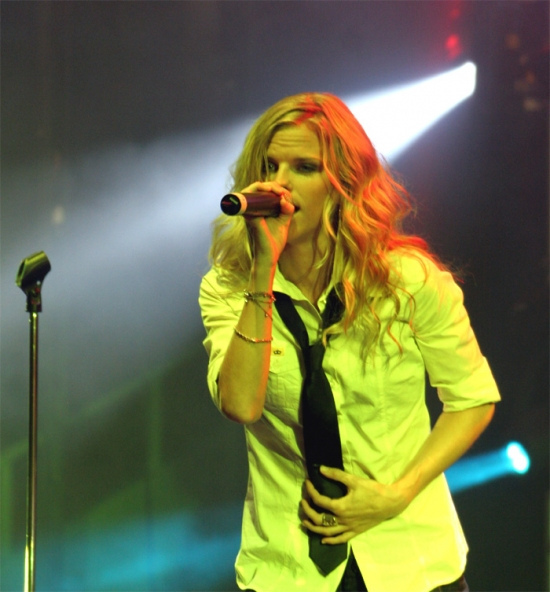
Ana Johnsson recorded "We Are" for the soundtrack to the film Spider-Man 2 and the single went to number 8.

The following table shows artists who achieved two or more top 10 entries in 2004, including singles that reached their peak in 2003. The figures include both main artists and featured artists, while appearances on ensemble charity records are also counted for each artist. The total number of weeks an artist spent in the top ten in 2004 is also shown.

Entries	Artist	Weeks	Singles
5	Pete Doherty ^{[H]}^{[I]}	5	"Born in England", "Can't Stand Me Now, "For Lovers", "Killamangiro", "What Became of the Likely Lads"
4	Andre 3000 ^{[J]}^{[K]}^{[L]}	15	"Hey Ya!", "Millionaire", "Roses", "The Way You Move"
4	Busted ^{[M]}	11	"Air Hostess", "Do They Know It's Christmas?", "Thunderbirds"/"3AM", "Who's David"
4	Duncan James ^{[N]}	8	"I Believe My Heart", "Breathe Easy", "Bubblin', "Curtain Falls"
4	Jamelia ^{[M]}	12	"DJ"/"Stop", "Do They Know It's Christmas?", "See It In A Boy's Eyes", "Thank You"
4	Kelis ^{[O]}	16	"Milkshake", "Not in Love", "Trick Me", "Millionaire"
4	McFly	10	"5 Colours in Her Hair", "Obviously", "That Girl", "Room on the 3rd Floor"
4	Morrissey	4	"Irish Blood, English Heart, "First of the Gang to Die", "Let Me Kiss You", "I Have Forgiven Jesus"
4	Natasha Bedingfield ^{[M]}	12	"Do They Know It's Christmas?", "Single", "These Words", "Unwritten"
4	Ronan Keating	8	"She Believes in Me", "Last Thing on My Mind", "I Hope You Dance", "Father and Son"
4	Sugababes ^{[M]}^{[P]}	4	"Caught in a Moment", "Do They Know It's Christmas?", "In the Middle", "Too Lost in You"
4	Tim Rice-Oxley ^{[M]}^{[Q]}	7	"Bedshaped", "Do They Know It's Christmas?", "Everybody's Changing", "Somewhere Only We Know"
4	Tom Chaplin ^{[M]}^{[Q]}	7	"Bedshaped", "Do They Know It's Christmas?", "Everybody's Changing", "Somewhere Only We Know"
4	Will Young ^{[M]}^{[P]}	8	"Do They Know It's Christmas?", "Friday's Child", "Leave Right Now", "Your Game"
3	Blue	5	"Breathe Easy", "Bubblin', "Curtain Falls"
3	Bono ^{[M]}^{[R]}	10	"Do They Know It's Christmas?", "Take Me to the Clouds Above", "Vertigo"
3	Brian McFadden ^{[S]}	6	"Obvious", "Real to Me", "Irish Son"
3	Britney Spears	14	"Toxic", "Everytime", "My Prerogative"
3	Eminem ^{[CC]}	11	"How Come", "Just Lose It", "My Band"
3	Girls Aloud	11	"The Show", "Love Machine", "I'll Stand by You"
3	Justin Hawkins ^{[T]}^{[M]}	6	"Christmas Time (Don't Let the Bells End)", "Do They Know It's Christmas?","Love Is Only a Feeling"
3	Kanye West ^{[U]}	4	"Through the Wire", "All Falls Down", "Talk About Our Love"
3	Keane	4	"Somewhere Only We Know", "Everybody's Changing", "Bedshaped"
3	Kylie Minogue	7	"Red Blooded Woman", "Chocolate", "I Believe in You"
3	Lemar ^{[M]}	9	"Another Day", "Do They Know It's Christmas?", "If There's Any Justice"
3	The Libertines ^{[I]}	3	"Born in England", "Can't Stand Me Now", "What Became of the Likely Lads"
3	Outkast ^{[L]}	13	"Hey Ya!", "The Way You Move", "Roses"
3	Rachel Stevens ^{[M]}	9	"Do They Know It's Christmas?", "More More More", "Some Girls"
3	Raghav ^{[V]}	7	"So Confused", "Can't Get Enough", "It Can't Be Right"
3	R. Kelly ^{[W]}	9	"Hotel", "Happy People"/"U Saved Me", "Wonderful"
3	Robbie Williams ^{[M]}	7	"Do They Know It's Christmas?", "Misunderstood", "Radio"
3	Usher	15	"Burn", "Confessions Part II"/"My Boo", "Yeah!"
2	2Play	6	"It Can't Be Right", "So Confused"
2	The 411	5	"Dumb", "On My Knees"
2	Christina Aguilera	6	"Car Wash", "Tilt Ya Head Back"
2	Anastacia	14	"Left Outside Alone", "Sick and Tired"
2	Atomic Kitten ^{[P]}	3	"Ladies' Night", "Someone like Me"/"Right Now 2004"
2	Avril Lavigne	5	"Don't Tell Me", "My Happy Ending"
2	Black Eyed Peas ^{[P]}	6	"Hey Mama", "Shut Up"
2	Beverley Knight ^{[M]}	4	"Come as You Are", "Do They Know It's Christmas?"
2	Beyoncé ^{[X]}	8	"Lose My Breath", "Naughty Girl"
2	Boogie Pimps	8	"Somebody to Love", "Sunny"
2	Bo' Selecta! ^{[P]}	2	"I Got You Babe"/"Soda Pop", "Proper Crimbo"
2	Christina Milian	5	"Dip It Low", "Whatever U Want"
2	D12	7	"How Come", "My Band"
2	Daniel Bedingfield ^{[M]}	4	"Do They Know It's Christmas?", "Nothing Hurts Like Love"
2	The Darkness ^{[P]}	3	"Christmas Time (Don't Let the Bells End)", "Love Is Only a Feeling"
2	Dizzee Rascal ^{[M]}	4	"Do They Know It's Christmas?", "Stand Up Tall"
2	Enya ^{[Y]}	9	"I Don't Wanna Know", "You Should Really Know"
2	Franz Ferdinand	3	"Matinée", "Take Me Out"
2	George Michael	3	"Amazing", "Flawless (Go to the City)"
2	Green Day	6	"American Idiot", "Boulevard of Broken Dreams"
2	Jay Sean	2	"Eyes on You", "Stolen"
2	JoJo	3	"Baby It's You", "Leave (Get Out)"
2	Joss Stone ^{[M]}	4	"Do They Know It's Christmas?", "You Had Me"
2	Maroon 5	8	"She Will Be Loved", "This Love"
2	Naila Boss ^{[Z]}	3	"It Can't Be Right", "You Should Really Know"
2	Nelly	8	"My Place"/"Flap Your Wings", "Tilt Ya Head Back"
2	Peter Andre	5	"Insania", "Mysterious Girl"
2	Pharrell Williams ^{[AA]}^{[BB]}	3	"Drop It Like It's Hot", "She Wants to Move"
2	Shaznay Lewis ^{[M]}	4	"Do They Know It's Christmas?", "Never Felt Like This Before"
2	Snow Patrol	5	"Do They Know It's Christmas?", "Run"
2	The Streets	8	"Dry Your Eyes", "Fit but You Know It"
2	Twista	7	"Slow Jamz", "Sunshine"
2	U2	7	"Take Me to the Clouds Above", "Vertigo"
2	V	2	"Blood, Sweat and Tears", "Hip to Hip"/"Can You Feel It"

== Notes ==
- ^{a} "Hey Ya" re-entered the top 10 on 17 January 2004 (week ending).
- ^{b} "Mysterious Girl" originally peaked at number two upon its initial release in 1996. In 2004, following a lengthy campaign on The Chris Moyles Show and Andre's appearance on the British reality show I'm a Celebrity, Get Me Out of Here!, the song was re-released and peaked at number-one for one week.
- ^{c} Released as the official single for Sport Relief.
- ^{d} "Call on Me" dropped to number 2 on 16 October 2004 (week ending) but returned to the top spot a week later.
- ^{e} Alicia Keys is only featured (along with Usher) on "My Boo". The song was released as a double-A side single in the United Kingdom with "Confessions Part II".
- ^{f} Released as the official single for Children in Need.
- ^{g} Released as a charity single by Band Aid 20 to aid the Darfur region in Sudan.
- ^{h} Pete Doherty had one solo hit single, one song with Babyshambles and two with The Libertines.
- ^{i} Pete Doherty and his band The Libertines were part of the Twisted X supergroup, who charted at number 9 with their single "Born in England" supporting England's UEFA Euro 2004 campaign.
- ^{j} Figure includes three top 10 hits with the group Outkast.
- ^{k} Figure includes appearance on Kelis' "Millionaire".
- ^{l} Figures includes song that first charted in 2003 but peaked in 2004.
- ^{m} Figure includes an appearance on the "Do They Know It's Christmas?" charity single by Band Aid 20.
- ^{n} Figure includes three top 10 hits with the group Blue.
- ^{o} Figure includes appearance on Enrique Iglesias' "Not in Love".
- ^{p} Figure includes song that peaked in 2003.
- ^{q} Figure includes three top 10 hits with the group Keane.
- ^{r} Figure includes two top 10 hits with the group U2.
- ^{s} Figure includes a top 10 hit with the group Westlife.
- ^{t} Figure includes two top 10 hits with the group The Darkness.
- ^{u} Figure includes appearance on Brandy's "Talk About Our Love".
- ^{v} Figure includes appearances on 2Play's "It Can't Be Right" and "So Confused".
- ^{w} Figure includes appearances on Cassidy's "Hotel" and Ja Rule's "Wonderful".
- ^{x} Figure includes a top 10 hit with the group Destiny's Child.
- ^{y} Figure includes appearances on Mario Winan's "I Don't Wanna Know" and The Pirates' "You Should Really Know".
- ^{z} Figure includes appearances on 2Play's "It Can't Be Right" and The Pirates' "You Should Really Know".
- ^{aa} Figure includes a top 10 hit with the group N.E.R.D.
- ^{bb} Figure includes appearance on Snoop Dogg's "Drop It Like It's Hot".
- ^{cc} Figure includes two top 10 hits with the group D12.

== See also ==
- 2004 in British music
- List of number-one singles from the 2000s (UK)
