= 2004 in British music charts =

This article gives details of the official charts from 2004. The year was special for many successful artists, including Eminem, Britney Spears, Scissor Sisters, Usher, Natasha Bedingfield, Jamelia, Franz Ferdinand, Green Day and The Streets.

== Summary of UK chart activity ==
The year started with the 2003 Christmas number one single topping the first chart of the year. This was followed by Michelle McManus, the winner of the second British series of Pop Idol with her first single release it topped the charts for 3 weeks. Second and third place contestants Mark Rhodes and Sam Nixon formed a duo, whose debut single was a cover of the Beatles song, "With a Little Help from My Friends", which also reached the No.1 spot.

On 9 March Westlife became a four piece after Brian McFadden decided to leave the band. His final single with the band was "Obvious" which peaked at No.3 in February; the remaining members Shane Filan, Mark Feehily, Nicky Byrne, and Kian Egan, went on to further success without McFadden.

In April, Eamon achieved the number one spot with a song with more profanities than any other hit single; it stayed at number one for 4 weeks. In another first the answer song by Frankee replaced the original single at the top of the charts and stayed there for 3 weeks despite selling less than half as many copies as Eamon. Both artists released follow-up songs but neither performed well, relegating the pair to one-hit wonder status.

A new version of "Alltogethernow" by The Farm was released to mark the Euro 2004 football tournament – it reached number five on 13 June with Come On England, a remake of Come On Eileen (Dexys Midnight Runners) by 4-4-2, reaching number two.

The UK Official Download Chart began at the start of September, the first number 1 being Flying Without Wings by Westlife. U2 released their single Vertigo on music download services weeks before it came out on CD. It stayed at number one for 8 non-consecutive weeks on the download chart. While illegal sharing of music over the Internet had been popular for a number of years the music industry started creating new, pay-per-download services, which were very well received. Charting companies soon took notice and various download charts appeared on radio and television. The use and increased popularity of iPods also helped to promote download services, and Apple's online iTunes Music Store launched in the UK in June, selling over 450,000 songs in the first week. Downloads began to be introduced into the main singles chart in 2005, although not fully until the beginning of 2007.

Albums by Dido, Katie Melua and Norah Jones dominated the first three months of the year. In May and June, Keane twice returned to the top of the charts with their album Hopes and Fears. The Scissor Sisters, The Streets and Maroon 5 also enjoyed great success with their albums. Numerous acts released greatest hits albums with Robbie Williams' being most successful, selling over one million copies in eight weeks.

Popular artists from the 1980s made successful returns with Duran Duran, The Cure, Depeche Mode and Morrissey releasing top ten singles. After appearing in the reality television show I'm a Celebrity, Get Me Out of Here!, Peter Andre re-released his 1996 hit single Mysterious Girl, this time getting to the top spot.

In September and October Eric Prydz "Call on me" stayed at number one for five non-consecutive weeks and staying in the chart for a further 14 weeks.

In October the music industry mourned the loss of John Peel, the Radio 1 DJ famous for championing new bands and musical styles.

20 years after the original, the Band Aid single Do They Know It's Christmas? was re-recorded and became a massive success, easily selling the most singles of the year, and holding the Christmas number 1 spot. The second week of release saw the song sell almost as many as the first, pushing it to half a million in less than 14 days. This was all additional to the number of legal downloads as the song topped that chart as well. The song had sold over a million copies in a month.

Artists who narrowly missed out on number ones were Kelis whose "Milkshake" peaked at number two for 4 weeks in January and February and "Trick Me" in June. Other acts were Anastacia with "Left Outside Alone" who peaked at number three but was the seventh best selling of the year staying on the chart for 18 weeks. Also the long-awaited return of Destiny's Child came in November when they peaked at number two for 4 weeks with "Lose My Breath", the first single released of their album Destiny Fulfilled.

On the issue date of 7 November, the top five consisted of all American performers/acts.

- #1. Eminem – "Just Lose It"
- #2. Destiny's Child – "Lose My Breath"
- #3. Britney Spears – "My Prerogative"
- #4. Christina Aguilera & Missy Elliott – "Car Wash"
- #5. Usher & Alicia Keys – "My Boo"

This broke a record in UK chart history. The No. 6 was also held by an American act, Ja Rule featuring Ashanti & R. Kelly with "Wonderful".

The most successful acts of 2004 were McFly whose first two debut singles entered at number one and they had two other top five hits later in the year. Natasha Bedingfield topped the singles, album and download charts. Britney Spears and Usher returned to the charts and had two number ones each ("Toxic" and "Yeah!" respectively) and another top five hits each. Girls Aloud also had big hits with songs including "The Show", "Love Machine" which both peaked at No. 2, and the 2004 Children in Need No. 1 single "I'll Stand by You". Former S Club star Rachel Stevens continued on with her solo career in this year too, reaching the top 3 once again with Sport Relief track "Some Girls" and a cover of Andrea True Connection's "More, More, More".

== Charts ==
=== Number-one singles ===
| Chart date (week ending) | Song | Artist(s) | Sales |
|---|---|---|---|
| 3 January | "Mad World" | Michael Andrews featuring Gary Jules | 167,000 |
| 10 January | "Mad World" | Michael Andrews featuring Gary Jules | 45,761 |
| 17 January | "All This Time" | Michelle McManus | 117,927 |
| 24 January | "All This Time" | Michelle McManus | 60,570 |
| 31 January | "All This Time" | Michelle McManus | 35,040 |
| 7 February | "Take Me to the Clouds Above" | LMC vs. U2 | 68,768 |
| 14 February | "Take Me to the Clouds Above" | LMC vs. U2 | 49,339 |
| 21 February | "With a Little Help from My Friends" | Sam & Mark | 42,776 |
| 28 February | "Who's David?" | Busted | 30,072 |
| 6 March | "Mysterious Girl" | Peter Andre | 107,870 |
| 13 March | "Toxic" | Britney Spears | 102,576 |
| 20 March | "Cha Cha Slide" | DJ Casper | 57,280 |
| 27 March | "Yeah!" | Usher featuring Ludacris and Lil' Jon | 87,354 |
| 3 April | "Yeah!" | Usher featuring Ludacris and Lil' Jon | 49,616 |
| 10 April | "Five Colours In Her Hair" | McFly | 49,511 |
| 17 April | "Five Colours In Her Hair" | McFly | 37,120 |
| 24 April | "Fuck It (I Don't Want You Back)" | Eamon | 153,287 |
| 1 May | "Fuck It (I Don't Want You Back)" | Eamon | 99,783 |
| 8 May | "Fuck It (I Don't Want You Back)" | Eamon | 79,293 |
| 15 May | "Fuck It (I Don't Want You Back)" | Eamon | 55,732 |
| 22 May | "F.U.R.B. (F U Right Back)" | Frankee | 79,563 |
| 29 May | "F.U.R.B. (F U Right Back)" | Frankee | 49,462 |
| 5 June | "F.U.R.B. (F U Right Back)" | Frankee | 36,440 |
| 12 June | "I Don't Wanna Know" | Mario Winans featuring P. Diddy and Enya | 61,303 |
| 19 June | "I Don't Wanna Know" | Mario Winans featuring P. Diddy and Enya | 47,770 |
| 26 June | "Everytime" | Britney Spears | 54,022 |
| 3 July | "Obviously" | McFly | 42,400 |
| 10 July | "Burn" | Usher | 49,334 |
| 17 July | "Burn" | Usher | 31,411 |
| 24 July | "Lola's Theme" | Shapeshifters | 51,967 |
| 31 July | "Dry Your Eyes" | The Streets | 54,539 |
| 7 August | "Thunderbirds / 3AM" | Busted | 70,665 |
| 14 August | "Thunderbirds / 3AM" | Busted | 36,288 |
| 21 August | "Baby Cakes" | 3 of a Kind | 55,067 |
| 28 August | "These Words" | Natasha Bedingfield | 68,745 |
| 4 September | "These Words" | Natasha Bedingfield | 40,978 |
| 11 September | "My Place / Flap Your Wings" | Nelly | 54,729 |
| 18 September | "Real to Me" | Brian McFadden | 34,435 |
| 25 September | "Call on Me" | Eric Prydz | 68,138 |
| 2 October | "Call on Me" | Eric Prydz | 46,370 |
| 9 October | "Call on Me" | Eric Prydz | 34,432 |
| 16 October | "Radio" | Robbie Williams | 41,734 |
| 23 October | "Call On Me" | Eric Prydz | 23,519 |
| 30 October | "Call On Me" | Eric Prydz | 21,749 |
| 6 November | "Wonderful" | Ja Rule featuring R. Kelly and Ashanti | 23,706 |
| 13 November | "Just Lose It" | Eminem | 63,312 |
| 20 November | "Vertigo" | U2 | 51,917 |
| 27 November | "I'll Stand by You" | Girls Aloud | 57,957 |
| 4 December | "I'll Stand by You" | Girls Aloud | 29,992 |
| 11 December | "Do They Know It's Christmas?" | Band Aid 20 | 292,594 |
| 18 December | "Do They Know It's Christmas?" | Band Aid 20 | 287,849 |
| 25 December | "Do They Know It's Christmas?" | Band Aid 20 | 231,492 |

=== Number-one downloads ===
| Chart date (week ending) | Song | Artist(s) |
|---|---|---|
| 4 September | Flying Without Wings | Westlife |
| 11 September | These Words | Natasha Bedingfield |
| 18 September | These Words | Natasha Bedingfield |
| 25 September | These Words | Natasha Bedingfield |
| 2 October | These Words | Natasha Bedingfield |
| 9 October | Vertigo | U2 |
| 16 October | Vertigo | U2 |
| 23 October | Vertigo | U2 |
| 30 October | Dogz Don't Kill People Wabbits Do | Mouldie Lookin Stain (Chris Moyles) |
| 6 November | Vertigo | U2 |
| 13 November | Vertigo | U2 |
| 20 November | Vertigo | U2 |
| 27 November | Vertigo | U2 |
| 4 December | Vertigo | U2 |
| 11 December | Do They Know It's Christmas? | Band Aid 20 |
| 18 December | Do They Know It's Christmas? | Band Aid 20 |
| 25 December | Do They Know It's Christmas? | Band Aid 20 |

=== Number-one albums ===
| Chart date (week ending) | Album | Artist | Sales |
|---|---|---|---|
| 3 January | Life for Rent | Dido | 233,629 |
| 10 January | Friday's Child | Will Young | 54,442 |
| 17 January | Life for Rent | Dido | 30,711 |
| 24 January | Life for Rent | Dido | 30,638 |
| 31 January | Call Off the Search | Katie Melua | 35,680 |
| 7 February | Call Off the Search | Katie Melua | 55,504 |
| 14 February | Call Off the Search | Katie Melua | 71,084 |
| 21 February | Feels Like Home | Norah Jones | 235,890 |
| 28 February | Feels Like Home | Norah Jones | 84,941 |
| 6 March | Call Off the Search | Katie Melua | 70,413 |
| 13 March | Call Off the Search | Katie Melua | 70,027 |
| 20 March | Call Off the Search | Katie Melua | 58,917 |
| 27 March | Patience | George Michael | 274,816 |
| 3 April | Confessions | Usher | 98,872 |
| 10 April | Anastacia | Anastacia | 87,398 |
| 17 April | Anastacia | Anastacia | 78,432 |
| 24 April | Greatest Hits | Guns N' Roses | 51,869 |
| 1 May | Greatest Hits | Guns N' Roses | 48,901 |
| 8 May | D12 World | D12 | 86,666 |
| 15 May | Greatest Hits | Guns N' Roses | 39,166 |
| 22 May | Hopes and Fears | Keane | 155,432 |
| 29 May | Hopes and Fears | Keane | 79,576 |
| 5 June | Under My Skin | Avril Lavigne | 87,496 |
| 12 June | Hopes and Fears | Keane | 58,732 |
| 19 June | No Roots | Faithless | 47,000 |
| 26 June | Hopes and Fears | Keane | 46,900 |
| 3 July | A Grand Don't Come for Free | The Streets | 34,000 |
| 10 July | Scissor Sisters | Scissor Sisters | 57,994 |
| 17 July | Room on the 3rd Floor | McFly | 61,589 |
| 24 July | Scissor Sisters | Scissor Sisters | 45,000 |
| 31 July | A Grand Don't Come for Free | The Streets | 48,000 |
| 7 August | Live in Hyde Park | Red Hot Chili Peppers | 63,330 |
| 14 August | Live in Hyde Park | Red Hot Chili Peppers | 42,259 |
| 21 August | Anastacia | Anastacia | 35,445 |
| 28 August | Songs About Jane | Maroon 5 | 49,998 |
| 4 September | Always Outnumbered, Never Outgunned | The Prodigy | 64,300 |
| 11 September | The Libertines | The Libertines | 72,189 |
| 18 September | Unwritten | Natasha Bedingfield | 83,954 |
| 25 September | Out of Nothing | Embrace | 55,613 |
| 2 October | American Idiot | Green Day | 89,385 |
| 9 October | Mind Body & Soul | Joss Stone | 75,100 |
| 16 October | Around the Sun | R.E.M. | 69,700 |
| 23 October | 10 Years Of Hits | Ronan Keating | 101,135 |
| 30 October | Greatest Hits | Robbie Williams | 320,081 |
| 6 November | Greatest Hits | Robbie Williams | 148,748 |
| 13 November | Il Divo | Il Divo | 132,829 |
| 20 November | Encore | Eminem | 212,459 |
| 27 November | Encore | Eminem | 168,249 |
| 4 December | How to Dismantle an Atomic Bomb | U2 | 200,863 |
| 11 December | How to Dismantle an Atomic Bomb | U2 | 127,982 |
| 18 December | How to Dismantle an Atomic Bomb | U2 | 178,539 |
| 25 December | Greatest Hits | Robbie Williams | 183,871 |

=== Number-one compilation albums ===
| Chart date (week ending) | Album |
|---|---|
| 3 January | Now 56 |
| 10 January | Now 56 |
| 17 January | Clubbers Guide: 2004 |
| 24 January | Clubbers Guide: 2004 |
| 31 January | Clubbers Guide: 2004 |
| 7 February | Kiss Smooth R&B |
| 14 February | Clubmix 2004 |
| 21 February | Beautiful |
| 28 February | BRIT Awards 2004 |
| 6 March | Clubmix 2004 |
| 13 March | Hit 40 UK |
| 20 March | Floorfillers |
| 27 March | The Best of New Woman |
| 3 April | Ultimate Diary Dancing |
| 10 April | Ultimate Diary Dancing |
| 17 April | Now 57 |
| 24 April | Now 57 |
| 1 May | Now 57 |
| 8 May | Now 57 |
| 15 May | Now 57 |
| 22 May | Now 57 |
| 29 May | Now 57 |
| 5 June | Now 57 |
| 12 June | Hits 58 |
| 19 June | Power Ballads II |
| 26 June | Power Ballads II |
| 3 July | Power Ballads II |
| 10 July | Essential R&B - The Very Best of R&B |
| 17 July | Essential R&B - The Very Best of R&B |
| 24 July | Clubland 5 |
| 31 July | Clubland 5 |
| 7 August | Now 58 |
| 14 August | Now 58 |
| 21 August | Now 58 |
| 28 August | Now 58 |
| 4 September | Now 58 |
| 11 September | Now 58 |
| 18 September | Now 58 |
| 25 September | Sad Songs |
| 2 October | Big Tunes - Living for the Weekend |
| 9 October | Now Years |
| 16 October | Now Years |
| 23 October | Big Tunes - Living for the Weekend |
| 30 October | Big Tunes - Living for the Weekend |
| 6 November | Pop Party 2 |
| 13 November | Pop Party 2 |
| 20 November | Pop Party 2 |
| 27 November | Now 59 |
| 4 December | Now 59 |
| 11 December | Now 59 |
| 18 December | Now 59 |
| 25 December | Now 59 |

== Year-end charts ==
Between 28 December 2003 and 1 January 2005.

=== Best-selling singles ===
| No. | Title | Artist | Peak position | Sales |
|---|---|---|---|---|
| 1 | "Do They Know It's Christmas?" | Band Aid 20 | 1 | 1,065,749 |
| 2 | "F**k It (I Don't Want You Back)" | Eamon | 1 | 552,628 |
| 3 | "Cha Cha Slide" | DJ Casper | 1 | 352,367 |
| 4 | "Call on Me" | Eric Prydz | 1 | 316,869 |
| 5 | "Yeah!" | Usher featuring Lil Jon and Ludacris | 1 | 300,740 |
| 6 | "All This Time" | Michelle McManus | 1 | 291,427 |
| 7 | "Left Outside Alone" | Anastacia | 3 | 275,296 |
| 8 | "Mysterious Girl" | Peter André | 1 | 259,691 |
| 9 | "Toxic" | Britney Spears | 1 | 258,604 |
| 10 | "Fuck You Right Back" | Frankee | 1 | 245,964 |
| 11 | "I Don't Wanna Know" | Mario Winans | 1 | |
| 12 | "Baby Cakes" | 3 of a Kind | 1 | |
| 13 | "Take Me to the Clouds Above" | LMC vs U2 | 1 | |
| 14 | "Milkshake" | Kelis | 2 | |
| 15 | "Lose My Breath" | Destiny's Child | 2 | |
| 16 | "My Band" | D12 | 2 | |
| 17 | "These Words" | Natasha Bedingfield | 1 | |
| 18 | "Everytime" | Britney Spears | 1 | |
| 19 | "Thunderbirds"/"3am" | Busted | 1 | |
| 20 | "Dry Your Eyes" | The Streets | 1 | |
| 21 | "Lola's Theme" | Shapeshifters | 1 | |
| 22 | "In the Shadows" | The Rasmus | 3 | |
| 23 | "Just Lose It" | Eminem | 1 | |
| 24 | "Thank You" | Jamelia | 2 | |
| 25 | "Hey Ya!" | Outkast | 3 | |
| 26 | "My Place"/"Flap Your Wings" | Nelly | 1 | |
| 27 | "Burn" | Usher | 1 | |
| 28 | "Dragostea din tei" | O-Zone | 3 | |
| 29 | "Mad World" | Michael Andrews featuring Gary Jules | 1 | |
| 30 | "Against All Odds" | Steve Brookstein | 2 (Note: Reached number 1 in 2005) | 153,770 |
| 31 | "Somebody to Love" | Boogie Pimps | 3 | |
| 32 | "5 Colours in Her Hair" | McFly | 1 | 150,072 |
| 33 | "Trick Me" | Kelis | 2 | |
| 34 | "I'll Stand by You" | Girls Aloud | 1 | |
| 35 | "Changes" | Ozzy Osbourne and Kelly Osbourne | 2 (Note: Reached number 1 in 2003) | |
| 36 | "Leave (Get Out)" | JoJo | 2 | |
| 37 | "Dip It Low" | Christina Milian | 2 | |
| 38 | "Hotel" | Cassidy | 3 | |
| 39 | "This Love" | Maroon 5 | 3 | |
| 40 | "Some Girls" | Rachel Stevens | 2 | |
| 41 | "My Neck, My Back (Lick It)" | Khia | 4 | |
| 42 | "Obviously" | McFly | 1 | |
| 43 | "If There's Any Justice" | Lemar | 3 | |
| 44 | "Vertigo" | U2 | 1 | |
| 45 | "Amazing" | George Michael | 4 | |
| 46 | "Breathe Easy" | Blue | 4 | |
| 47 | "Slow Jamz" | Twista featuring Kanye West and Jamie Foxx | 3 | |
| 48 | "Car Wash" | Christina Aguilera featuring Missy Elliott | 4 | |
| 49 | "Love Machine" | Girls Aloud | 2 | |
| 50 | "I'm Still in Love with You" | Sean Paul featuring Sasha | 6 | |

=== Best-selling albums ===
| No. | Title | Artist | Peak position | Sales |
|---|---|---|---|---|
| 1 | Scissor Sisters | Scissor Sisters | 1 | 1,594,259 |
| 2 | Hopes and Fears | Keane | 1 | 1,593,677 |
| 3 | Greatest Hits | Robbie Williams | 1 | 1,530,788 |
| 4 | Songs About Jane | Maroon 5 | 1 | 1,490,117 |
| 5 | Call Off the Search | Katie Melua | 1 | 1,356,962 |
| 6 | Anastacia | Anastacia | 1 | 1,115,928 |
| 7 | Confessions | Usher | 1 | 1,108,590 |
| 8 | Feels Like Home | Norah Jones | 1 | 993,632 |
| 9 | Final Straw | Snow Patrol | 3 | 991,219 |
| 10 | Il Divo | Il Divo | 1 | 968,460 |
| 11 | Greatest Hits | Guns N' Roses | 1 | |
| 12 | 10 Years of Hits | Ronan Keating | 1 | |
| 13 | A Grand Don't Come for Free | The Streets | 1 | |
| 14 | How to Dismantle an Atomic Bomb | U2 | 1 | |
| 15 | Encore | Eminem | 1 | |
| 16 | The Soul Sessions | Joss Stone | 4 | |
| 17 | Franz Ferdinand | Franz Ferdinand | 3 | |
| 18 | American Idiot | Green Day | 1 | 746,364 |
| 19 | Unwritten | Natasha Bedingfield | 1 | |
| 20 | Patience | George Michael | 1 | |
| 21 | Friday's Child | Will Young | 1 | |
| 22 | Ultimate Kylie | Kylie Minogue | 4 | |
| 23 | Speakerboxxx/The Love Below | Outkast | 8 | |
| 24 | Allow Us to Be Frank | Westlife | 3 | |
| 25 | Greatest Hits: My Prerogative | Britney Spears | 2 | |
| 26 | Elephunk | The Black Eyed Peas | 3 | |
| 27 | Twentysomething | Jamie Cullum | 3 | |
| 28 | Greatest Hits | Shania Twain | 6 | |
| 29 | Room on the Third Floor | McFly | 1 | |
| 30 | Life for Rent | Dido | 1 | |
| 31 | Under My Skin | Avril Lavigne | 1 | |
| 32 | O | Damien Rice | 8 | |
| 33 | Mind Body & Soul | Joss Stone | 1 | |
| 34 | The College Dropout | Kanye West | 12 | |
| 35 | Thank You | Jamelia | 4 | |
| 36 | Destiny Fulfilled | Destiny's Child | 5 | |
| 37 | Best of Blue | Blue | 6 | |
| 38 | The Best of LeAnn Rimes | LeAnn Rimes | 2 | |
| 39 | Love Songs: A Compilation... Old and New | Phil Collins | 10 | |
| 40 | The Singles 1992–2003 | No Doubt | 5 | |
| 41 | Hot Fuss | The Killers | 5 (Note: Reached number 1 in 2005) | |
| 42 | Stardust: The Great American Songbook, Volume III | Rod Stewart | 3 | |
| 43 | A Ticket for Everyone | Busted | 11 | |
| 44 | What Will the Neighbours Say? | Girls Aloud | 6 | |
| 45 | Up All Night | Razorlight | 3 | |
| 46 | Who Killed...... The Zutons? | The Zutons | 6 | |
| 47 | Gold: Greatest Hits | ABBA | 4 (Note: Reached number 1 in 1992) | |
| 48 | Singles | Travis | 4 | |
| 49 | Out of Nothing | Embrace | 1 | |
| 50 | Time to Grow | Lemar | 8 | |

=== Best-selling compilations ===
| No. | Title | Peak position |
|---|---|---|
| 1 | Now 59 | 1 |
| 2 | Now 57 | 1 |
| 3 | Now 58 | 1 |
| 4 | Pop Party 2 | 1 |
| 5 | Ultimate Dirty Dancing (Original Soundtrack) | 1 |
| 6 | Bridget Jones: The Edge of Reason (Original Soundtrack) | 2 |
| 7 | Power Ballads II | 1 |
| 8 | Cream Classics | 2 |
| 9 | The Annual 2005 | 2 |
| 10 | Essential R&B – The Very Best of R&B: Summer 2004 | 1 |

== Total album sales of 2004 ==
Total sales for albums in 2004 amounted to 163,405,658.

== See also ==
- List of UK Dance Singles Chart number ones of 2004
- List of UK Independent Singles Chart number ones of 2004
- List of UK Rock & Metal Singles Chart number ones of 2004
