= Make It Hot =

Make It Hot may refer to:

- Make It Hot (album), by Nicole Wray
- Make It Hot (EP), by Minho, 2026
- "Make It Hot" (Nicole Wray song), 1998
- "Make It Hot" (VS song), 2004
- "Make It Hot", a song by JDiggz from Memoirs of a Playbwoy
- "Make It Hot", a song by Kottonmouth Kings from Kottonmouth Kings
- "Make It Hot", a song by LL Cool J from Mr. Smith
- "Make It Hot", a song by Mirah from Advisory Committee
- "Make It Hot", a song by Major Lazer and Anitta, 2019
