= All Kinds of Trouble =

Studio album by VS
- Released: 18 October 2004
- Recorded: 2003–2004
- Length: 43:18
- Label: Innocent
- Producer: StarGate; Eric Taylor

Singles from All Kinds of Trouble
- 1. "Love You Like Mad" Released: 23 February 2004; 2. "Call U Sexy" Released: 7 June 2004; 3. "Make It Hot" Released: 11 October 2004; 4. "If You Leave Me Now" Released: 29 December 2004

All Kinds of Trouble is the only studio album by British group VS. It was released on 18 October 2004, a week after the release of the album's third single, "Make It Hot". Despite having three successful singles, the album was a commercial failure, peaking at number 142 in its first week, then falling out of the charts. The album's planned fourth single, "If You Leave Me Now", was only released promotionally, as prior to its release, the band disbanded.

== Track listing ==
No.	Title	Writer(s)	Producer(s)	Length
1.	"All Kind of Trouble"	Ali Tennant, Samson Dedewo, Jaime Douglas, Tyran Graham	Deekay
2.	"Call U Sexy"	Steve Jolley, Tony Swain, Leee John, Ashley Ingram, Mich Hansen, Joe Belmaati, Remee, Tennant, Douglas, Graham	Cutfather & Joe
3.	"Don't I Treat U Good"	Darrell "Digga" Branch, Davidovich, Douglas, Graham	Branch
4.	"Make It Hot"	Lars H. Jensen, Johannes Jørgensen, Obi, Douglas, Graham, Marvin Humes, Chinyere McKenzie, Ryan Taylor	Deekay, Obi^{[a]}, Jensen^{[a]}
5.	"If You Leave Me Now"	Peter Cetera, Hansen, Belmaati, Remee, Tennant
6.	"I Wanna See U Again"	Hansen, Belmaati, Remee, Tennant
7.	"Do It Up Tonight"	Tennant, Dedewo, Douglas, Graham	Fredro, Mats Berntoft^{[b]}
8.	"Touch 'N' Go"	Wayne "Tatz" Beckford, Tennant, Douglas, Graham, Humes, McKenzie, Taylor	Beckford
9.	"All I Wanna Do"
10.	"Love You Like Mad"	Mikkel S. Eriksen, Hallgeir Rustan, Tor Erik Hermansen, Douglas, Graham, Humes, Taylor	Stargate
11.	"U & Me"	Copenhaniacs, Tennant, Douglas, Graham	Copenhaniacs
12.	"N.V.S"
13.	"Bump That"	Tennant, Guz Lally, Graham, Humes, McKenzie, Taylor, Jaime Summaz
14.	"Crushed (Have U Ever)"

Notes

- "Call U Sexy" contains elements of "Body Talk" (1981) by Imagination.
- "If You Leave Me Now" contains elements of "If You Leave Me Now" (1976) by Chicago.
- ^{^[a]} signifies a vocal producer
- ^{^[b]} signifies a co-producer

== Charts ==
Chart (2004)	Position
UK Albums Chart	142
Irish Albums Chart	143
