= Demon High =

2021 single by Lil Uzi Vert

Single by Lil Uzi Vert
- Released: October 29, 2021
- Genre: Pop rap; emo rap; trap
- Length: 3:17
- Label: Atlantic: Generation Now
- Songwriters: Symere Woods; Ryan Vojtesak; Masamune Kudo; Andrew Franklin
- Producers: Charlie Handsome; Rex Kudo; Pro Logic

Lil Uzi Vert singles chronology
"V12" (2021)	"Demon High" (2021)	"Bbycakes" (2022)

Music video
- "Demon High" on YouTube

"Demon High" is a song by American rapper Lil Uzi Vert, released on October 29, 2021. Produced by Charlie Handsome, Rex Kudo, and Pro Logic, the song sees Lil Uzi Vert sing-rapping about a failed relationship.

== Composition ==
"Demon High" is an emo rap and trap song, inspired by a pop-punk and new wave sound. In the song, Lil Uzi Vert expresses their distrust for women ("I feel the demons (Yeah), comin' out of me / I won't ignite the flame / These girls, they're all the same"), lamenting a failed relationship in particular ("She don't givе a damn about me, only care what money's worth"). In the second verse, they briefly boast their wealth ("Stayed on my grind like I'm Ryan Sheckler (Woah) / If you do me good, that's a fur, that's a pur-").

== Music video ==
An accompanying music video was released on October 29, 2021, and sees Lil Uzi Vert involved in antics at a high school. They are dressed in a "simple black suit", while the others are wearing "spooky masks and makeup" in reference to Halloween. Lil Uzi Vert is seen running from a crowd, getting a tattoo, engaging a food fight, joining a synchronized dancing group, and "getting mischievous" with a girl in a bathroom.

== Charts ==
Chart performance for "Demon High"
Chart (2021)	Peak position
Canada Hot 100 (Billboard)	87
Global 200 (Billboard)	121
New Zealand Hot Singles (RMNZ)	20
US Billboard Hot 100	61
US Hot R&B/Hip-Hop Songs (Billboard)	18
