= Kevin McDaid =

British singer (born 1984)

- Born: Kevin McDaid; 7 March 1984 (age 42); North Shields, Tyne and Wear, England
- Genre: Pop
- Occupations: Singer, photographer
- Instrument: Vocals
- Years active: 2004–2005

Kevin McDaid (born 7 March 1984) is a British singer. Born in North Shields in Newcastle upon Tyne, he spent part of his childhood in Nigeria. He was best known as member of the British boy band V, which he joined in 2003 along with four other boys. The band had three fairly successful chart hits during 2004, before splitting up in February 2005, less than a year after their first single was released.

He now works as a personal trainer.

== Personal life ==
In August 2005, he was announced in The Sun as the long-term boyfriend of Westlife member Mark Feehily. The couple appeared on the cover of the December 2007 issue of Attitude. They got engaged on 28 January 2010 split up in 2011.
