= Call U Sexy =

2004 single by VS

Single by VS

from the album All Kinds of Trouble
- B-side: "Hold Up"
- Released: 7 June 2004
- Length: 3:32
- Label: Innocent, Virgin
- Songwriter(s): Hallgeir Rustan, Mikkel Storleer Eriksen, Tor Erik Hermansen, Marvin Humes, Eric Taylor
- Producer(s): StarGate

VS singles chronology
"Love You Like Mad" (2004)	"Call U Sexy" (2004)	"Make It Hot" (2004)

"Call U Sexy" is a song by British band VS, released as the second single from their debut studio album, All Kinds of Trouble (2004). The song uses a sample of the song "Body Talk" by Imagination. "Call U Sexy" was released on 7 June 2004 and peaked at number 11 on the UK Singles Chart and number 37 in Ireland. It was also a minor hit in Flanders and Romania.

== Track listings ==
UK CD1

1. "Call U Sexy" (radio mix) – 3:22
2. "Love You Like Mad" (Kenz slow jam) – 4:07

UK CD2

1. "Call U Sexy" – 3:32
2. "Hold Up" – 4:11
3. "Call U Sexy" (Urban North remix) – 5:48
4. "Call U Sexy" (video) – 3:32

== Charts ==
Chart (2004)	Peak position
Belgium (Ultratip Bubbling Under Flanders)	18
Ireland (IRMA)	37
Romania (Romanian Top 100)	63
Scotland (OCC)	19
UK Singles (OCC)	11
UK Hip Hop/R&B (OCC)	6
