= Hip to Hip =

2004 single by V

Single by V

from the album You Stood Up
- A-side: "Can You Feel It?"
- B-side: "Chills in the Evening" (live)
- Released: 9 August 2004
- Length: 3:33
- Label: Universal; Island
- Songwriters: Miranda Cooper; Brian Higgins; Xenomania
- Producers: Brian Higgins; Xenomania

V singles chronology
"Blood, Sweat and Tears" (2004)	"Hip to Hip" / "Can You Feel It" (2004)	"You Stood Up" (2004)

Music video
- "Hip to Hip" on YouTube

"Hip to Hip" is a song by British boy band V. It was released on 9 August 2004 as a double A-side with their cover of "Can You Feel It?" by the Jacksons. The single charted at number five on the UK Singles Chart and number 29 on the Irish Singles Chart.

== Track listings ==
UK CD1

1. "Hip to Hip"
2. "Can You Feel It?"

UK CD2

1. "Hip to Hip"
2. "Can You Feel It?"
3. "Chills in the Evening" (live audio from showcase featuring Tom and Danny from McFly)
4. "Hip to Hip" / "Can You Feel It?" (Tom Elmhirst remix)
5. "Hip to Hip" (acoustic version)
6. "Chills in the Evening" (live video from showcase)
7. Interview (Part 1)

UK DVD single

1. "Hip to Hip" (audio)
2. "Can You Feel It?" (audio)
3. "Boy Band Medley" (audio)
4. "Hip to Hip" (video)
5. "Can You Feel It?" (Discomania performance)
6. Interview (Part 2)

== Credits and personnel ==
Credits are lifted from the UK CD1 liner notes.

Studio

- Mixed at Metropolis (London, England)

Personnel

- Miranda Cooper – writing, composition
- Brian Higgins – writing, composition, programming, production
- Xenomania – writing, composition, production
- Tim Powell – programming, mixing
- Jon Shave – programming
- Tim "Rolf" Larcombe – programming
- Matt Tait – mixing

== Charts ==
=== Weekly charts ===
Chart (2004)	Peak position
Ireland (IRMA)	29
Scottish Singles Sales (Official Charts)	4
UK Singles (Official Charts)	5

=== Year-end charts ===
Chart (2004)	Position
UK Singles (OCC)	160
