= Love You Like Mad =

2004 single by VS

Single by VS

from the album All Kinds of Trouble
- Released: 23 February 2004
- Length: 3:38
- Label: Virgin; Innocent
- Songwriter(s): Hallgeir Rustan; Mikkel Se; Tor Erik Hermansen; Marvin Humes; Eric Taylor
- Producer(s): Stargate

VS singles chronology
"Love You Like Mad" (2004)	"Call U Sexy" (2004)

"Love You Like Mad" is a song by British R&B group VS. It was issued as their debut single and as the lead single from their first studio album, All Kinds of Trouble (2004). The song was written and produced by Norwegian production team Stargate, with additional co-writing from band members Jaime Douglas and Tyran Graham. Released on 23 February 2004 via Virgin and Innocent Records, "Love You Like Mad" peaked at number seven on the UK Singles Chart and remains their highest-charting single.

== Track listings ==
UK CD single

1. "Love You Like Mad"
2. "Love You Like Mad" (Bon Garcon remix)

== Charts ==
=== Weekly charts ===
Chart (2004)	Peak position
Belgium (Ultratip Bubbling Under Flanders)	16
Ireland (IRMA)	43
Scotland (OCC)	18
UK Singles (OCC)	7

=== Year-end charts ===
Chart (2004)	Position
UK Singles (OCC)	147
