= VS (group) =

British musical group

- Genres: Pop, R&B, hip hop
- Years active: 2004–2005
- Labels: Innocent Records; EMI (2004)
- Past members: Jaime Summaz; Chinyere McKenzie; Blimi; Marvin Humes; Ryan Taylor
- Website: www.vsband.com/

VS were a British R&B and pop group that had three hit singles in the United Kingdom. The group were the brainchild of Blue member Simon Webbe (who was also their manager), Melody from DJ Pied Piper and the Masters of Ceremonies, and established singer-songwriter Ali Tennant, who came together to form the production company 'Love for Music'. The group consisted of Vocalists Marvin Humes, Chinyere McKenzie, Ryan Taylor, & Rappers Jaime Summaz and Blimi.

== Members ==
- Jaime Summaz – Jaime is a rapper, songwriter, and actress from Manchester. She is best friends with Simon Webbe, and thus, he offered her a place in the band. Since the split of the band, she featured on a remix of Blue's "Breathe Easy", and has since become a solo artist, releasing an EP in 2007.
- Chinyere McKenzie – Chinyere is a choreographer and singer. She set up her own dance school in Manchester at an early age, to work with under-privileged children. Chinyere is the lead female vocalist in the band, and is heavily responsible for the dance routines in the band's music videos. Chinyere Mckenzie, now Radio Presenter 90.1FM and CEO of Muma Knows Best, which an interactive multi platform, providing opportunity for women and men to share via following her our personal story of self-discovery and motherhood.
- Blimi – Blimi is a rapper from west London. He met Webbe during a visit to the barbers, as the pair both visit the same establishment. He overheard that Webbe was putting together a band, and offered himself up for audition. Prior to joining the band, he won the Tim Westwood Open Mic contest in 1997.
- Marvin Humes – Marvin is a singer and actor. He appeared as a regular cast member in BBC One's Holby City prior to joining the band. Humes wanted to make music his career, and after recording several tracks, he met Webbe at the 2003 Soccer Six Industry Football match and handed him a demo tape. In 2008, Humes auditioned on The X Factor with a boy band called JLS and he successfully made it through to the live shows. JLS went on to finish second and went on to achieve five number-one singles in the United Kingdom.
- Ryan Taylor – Ryan is a singer and actor. He had been singing from an early age and was good friends with Humes. Humes suggested that he join VS as the fifth member, thus completing the line-up. Since the split of the band, Taylor has released a solo single, before turning his hand to acting, having roles in The Bill and Silent Witness.

== Music career ==
=== 2004–2005: All Kinds of Trouble and split ===
In 2005, VS announced they were to split after releasing the album, All Kinds of Trouble.

=== Reunion ===
In December 2013, it was announced that VS would get back together, although Humes has not yet confirmed whether he is returning.

== Discography ==
=== Album ===
| Year | Album | Chart positions | |
| Year | Album | UK | IRL |
|---|---|---|---|
| 2004 | All Kinds of Trouble | 142 | 143 |

=== Singles ===
| Year | Song | Chart positions | | Album |
| Year | Song | UK | IRL | Album |
|---|---|---|---|---|
| 2004 | "Love You Like Mad" | 7 | - | All Kinds of Trouble |
| 2004 | "Call U Sexy" | 11 | - | All Kinds of Trouble |
| 2004 | "Make It Hot" | 29 | - | All Kinds of Trouble |
