= Naila Boss =

English underground rapper

Naila Boss is an English underground rapper from Hackney, London.

== Discography ==
=== Singles ===
- "It Can't Be Right" (2004) - UK No. 8 (with 2Play and Raghav)
- "La La La" (2004) - UK No. 65
- "You Should Really Know" (2004) - UK No. 8 (with the Pirates, Shola Ama, Ishani and Enya)
