= 2Play =

British musician and mixed martial artist (born 1977)

2Play (Wesley Johnson)
- Also known as: 2Play, Wesley J, Special T
- Born: Wesley Johnson; 22 July 1977 (age 49)
- Origin: London, England
- Genres: Dancehall, reggae, R&B, hip hop, UK garage
- Occupations: Musician, record producer, songwriter, rapper
- Years active: 1997–present

Wesley Johnson (born 22 July 1977), known by his stage name 2Play, is an English musician, record producer, and former mixed martial artist.

== Music career ==
Johnson first entered the music scene in 1997 as a UK garage producer, under the aliases Wesley 2 Play and Special T. His first single under the name 2Play, "So Confused", was released in early 2004, and featured Canadian-Indian singer Raghav and MC Jucxi D. It reached number 6 on the UK Singles Chart, and won Best Collaboration at the MOBO Awards, and Best Single at the UK Asian Music Awards. A cover of Kevin Lyttle's "Turn Me On" appears on the "So Confused" single. The following single "It Can't Be Right", featuring Raghav and Naila Boss, was also a UK top 10 hit. The next single, a cover version of George Michael's "Careless Whisper", reached number 29. A house remix and a garage remix of "Careless Whisper" were also produced, under the alias Special T.

An album, including all the above singles, was produced and mastered in 2006, but never released at the time. 2Play independently released the album to digital platforms in 2019, under the title Back in Business.

=== Discography ===
==== Albums ====
- Back in Business (2019)

==== Singles ====
Year	Single	Peak chart positions			Album
Year	Single	UK	ITA	NL	Album
2004	"So Confused" (featuring Raghav and Jucxi)	6	46	44	Back in Business
2004	"It Can't Be Right" (featuring Raghav, Jucxi and Naila Boss)	8	—	—	Back in Business
2004	"Careless Whisper" (featuring Thomas Jules and Jucxi D)	29	—	—	Back in Business
2007	"Close to You" (featuring Moni)	—	—	—	Non-album single
2009	"That's What the Girls Like" (featuring Maxi Priest, Moni and Jucxi D)	—	—	—	Back in Business

== Mixed martial arts record ==
Wesley Johnson
- Born: 22 July 1977 (age 49); London, England
- Division: Lightweight
- Style: Brazilian Jiu-Jitsu, Karate
- Fighting out of: London, England
- Rank: black belt in Brazilian Jiu-Jitsu black belt in Karate

Mixed martial arts record
- Total: 8
- Wins: 5
- By knockout: 1
- By submission: 4
- Losses: 2
- By knockout: 1
- By submission: 1
- No contests: 1

Other information
- Mixed martial arts record from Sherdog

In addition to his music career, Johnson was also a mixed martial artist. He fought for Cage Rage and Ultimate Challenge MMA.

=== Record ===
Professional record breakdown
8 matches	5 wins	2 losses
By knockout	1	1
By submission	4	1
No contests	1	

Res.	Record	Opponent	Method	Event	Date	Round	Time	Location	Notes
Loss	5–2 (1)	Kester Mamba	Submission (heel hook)	UWC 23	13 July 2013	1	4:57	Southend-on-Sea, England	
Win	5–1 (1)	Simon Carington	Submission (guillotine choke)	UCMMA 11 – Adrenaline Rush	27 March 2010	1	N/A	London, England	
Loss	4–1 (1)	Luke Smith	TKO (punches)	UCMMA 9 – Fighting for Heroes	5 December 2009	1	4:09	London, England	
Win	4–0 (1)	Danny Fletcher	Submission (flying triangle choke)	UCMMA 6 – Payback	22 August 2009	1	1:02	London, England	
Win	3–0 (1)	Alex Harvey	Submission (triangle choke)	UCMMA 5 – Heat	11 July 2009	1	N/A	London, England	
NC	2–0 (1)	Scott Pooley	No Contest	UCMMA 2 – Unbreakable	7 February 2009	1	N/A	London, England	
Win	2–0	Matt Smith	Submission (triangle choke)	Cage Rage 28 – VIP	20 September 2008	1	0:44	London, England	
Win	1–0	Mark Brown	TKO (punches)	Cage Rage 27 – Step Up	12 July 2008	1	0:31	London, England	
