= Make It Hot (VS song) =

Single by VS

from the album All Kinds of Trouble
- Released: 11 October 2004
- Length: 3:28
- Label: Innocent; Virgin
- Songwriter(s): Hallgeir Rustan, Mikkel Se, Tor Erik Hermansen, Marvin Humes, Eric Taylor
- Producer(s): StarGate

VS singles chronology
"Call U Sexy" (2004)	"Make It Hot" (2004)	"If You Leave Me Now" (2004)

"Make It Hot" is the third single released by British band VS, and the third taken from their debut studio album, All Kinds of Trouble (2004). The single was released on 11 October 2004, peaking at number 29 on the UK Singles Chart.

== Track listings ==
- UK CD1
1. "Make It Hot" - 3:28
2. "Call U Sexy" (Urban North Down South Mix) - 4:38
- UK CD2
1. "Make It Hot" - 3:28
2. "Make It Hot" (Illicit Mix) - 4:03
3. "All Kinds of Trouble" (Album Medley) - 3:05
4. "Make It Hot" (Music Video) - 3:28

== Charts ==
Chart (2004)	Peak position
Scotland (OCC)	37
UK Singles (OCC)	29
