= V (group) =

British boy band

- Origin: London, England
- Genres: Pop
- Years active: 2003–2005, 2023–present
- Labels: Island Records
- Members: Antony Brant; Aaron Buckingham; Kevin McDaid; Leon Pisani
- Past members: Mark Harle

V are a British five-piece boy band made up of Antony Brant, Aaron Buckingham, Mark Harle, Kevin McDaid and Leon Pisani. Founded in 2003, they disbanded after two years, in 2005. They reunited in 2023 without Mark Harle.

== Career ==
V were formed in 2003 after a series of auditions by Prestige, the same management team behind Busted. Group member Antony Brant came up with the band name "V" because V is the Roman numeral for five and there were five members in the band. V made their debut at the same time as McFly by supporting Busted's arena tour in the spring of 2004.

Their first single, "Blood, Sweat and Tears", was released in May 2004 and went into the UK Singles Chart at number 6. The music video was shot in Miami, Florida in February 2004 and the single contained a collaboration with McFly, called "Chills in the Evening" written by Tom Fletcher from McFly and James Bourne from Busted. The band's second single, released in August 2004, was a double A-side and consisted of a new song "Hip to Hip" and a cover of the Jacksons' song "Can You Feel It". The music video showed the group dressed up in day-to-day jobs like an ice cream man and milkman. It charted at number 5 in the UK Singles Chart.

The third single, "You Stood Up", reached number 12 after an appearance on Top of the Pops, but their debut album of the same name only made number 86 on the UK Albums Chart. In March 2005, V announced on their website their decision to split up, stating "it just hasn't happened for us as big as we would have liked". They reunited in 2023 without Mark Harle to record new music and perform shows in the UK.

== After break-up ==
- Mark Harle was a drummer for indie band Little Comets between 2008 and 2011.
- Kevin McDaid became a professional photographer, including photographing the covers for the Westlife albums Where We Are and Gravity
- Aaron Buckingham moved into A&R work, including managing the band Lawson
- Antony Brant remained friends with the members of McFly, and toured with the band alongside James Bourne and the Vamps in the spring of 2013 as a compere to their Memory Lane tour

== Discography ==
Studio albums

Title	Details	Peak position
Title	Details	UK
You Stood Up	Release date: November 2004; Label: Island Records; Formats: CD, music download	86

Singles

Year	Single	Peak chart positions		Album
Year	Single	UK	IRE	Album
2004	"Blood, Sweat and Tears"	6	30	You Stood Up
2004	"Hip to Hip"/"Can You Feel It"	5	29	You Stood Up
2004	"You Stood Up"	12	35	You Stood Up
