= Band Aid 20 =

2004 British charity supergroup

- Origin: UK
- Genre: Christmas
- Years active: 2004

Band Aid 20 was the 2004 incarnation of the charity supergroup Band Aid. The group, which included Daniel Bedingfield, Dido, Justin Hawkins of The Darkness, Thom Yorke and Jonny Greenwood of Radiohead, Chris Martin of Coldplay, Bono of U2, and Paul McCartney, re-recorded the 1984 song "Do They Know It's Christmas?", written by Band Aid organisers Bob Geldof and Midge Ure.

== Recording ==
The song was recorded on 14 November 2004, to benefit Sudan's troubled Darfur region, and was released that same month. The single became the UK's biggest seller of 2004 as well as the Christmas number one.

Bono and Paul McCartney were the only artists from the original Band Aid to lend their voices to Band Aid 20. There was a reported dispute over the line 'Well tonight thank God it's them, instead of you', which Bono sang on the original version. Justin Hawkins, of the Darkness, laid down a version of the line, as did Robbie Williams, but Bono insisted on re-recording his version, which was eventually used on the record.

Travis lead singer Fran Healy, who played guitar on the recording, said, "It's dead exciting. When [the 1984 version] was first recorded, I was 11 and I went everywhere looking for it and I couldn't find it, and now we're going to do the follow-up to it. It's going to be great, McCartney's doing it, Bono's going to sing his own line, [and] we're going to help out with some music, with Nigel Godrich, who produced the single. I really wanted to get Franz Ferdinand involved in it—I think they're going to do it, although I haven't spoken to Midge Ure for about a week now."

"Midge did a thumbnail sketch of the original with new music on it," Healy continued. "He's got the Darkness doing the guitars at the end, and he's changed the arrangement of it. He shipped that over to L.A. where Nigel was working with McCartney. If it turns out absolutely shit, it does not matter. What I will say is you've got to buy the record because it's the only record that's going to save lives this side of Christmas, and you can't ask for more than that."

A special documentary titled Band Aid 20: Justice, Not Charity, which went behind-the-scenes of the new recording, was broadcast by BBC One on 6 December 2004.

== Release ==
The Band Aid 20 single was first played simultaneously on The Chris Moyles Show (on BBC Radio 1) and the breakfast shows on Virgin Radio and Capital Radio, at 8 am on 16 November 2004. The music video was first broadcast in the UK simultaneously over multiple channels, including the five UK analogue terrestrial channels, at 5:55 pm on 18 November 2004, with an introduction by Madonna.

One of the new ways to buy the song, by downloading it from the internet, hit a problem when Apple Computer's iTunes Music Store initially refused to supply it, due to their fixed-pricing policy. A partial solution was reached after a few days, enabling UK users to download the song at the standard iTunes price, with Apple donating an extra amount (equivalent to the price difference) to the Band Aid Trust.

The single sold 72,000 copies in the first 24 hours when it was released on 29 November 2004, and went straight in at No. 1 in the UK Singles Chart on 5 December 2004. The CD version sold over 200,000 copies in the first week and was the fastest-selling single of the year. It stayed at No. 1 for Christmas and the week after, a total of four weeks, one week shorter than the 1984 original. It was the last single ever to sell a million physical copies in the UK as the format largely died out other than as a niche product.

The single was supported by companies such as the mobile entertainment provider, WebTV, which allowed customers to play and purchase the song and music video on their mobile phones. It could also be purchased with a bundle of tracks including both the original 1984 version and the 2004 version of "Do They Know It's Christmas?". HMV stores opened early to give customers more time to buy the single and staff wore Band Aid 20 shirts that said, "Have you bought your copy yet?". Prime Minister Tony Blair was seen picking up a copy of the charity single at an HMV store in Edinburgh.

== Critical reception ==
Band Aid 20's efforts met with mixed criticism. The BBC said the new generation of singers, who differed greatly from those that appeared on the 1984 original, endeavoured to fit their talents into a 20-year-old template resulting in an "anonymous" record. The Guardian said the appearance of female singers was successful.

== Artwork ==
British artist Damien Hirst designed an intimidating cover for the Band Aid 20 single, featuring the grim reaper and a starving African child. However, this was later dropped after fears that it might scare children.

== Participants ==
Organisers and producers:

- Midge Ure – organiser
- Nigel Godrich (Radiohead, Travis) – producer
- Bob Geldof – producer
- Damon Albarn (Blur, Gorillaz)
- Harry Sutcliffe – sound engineer

Instruments:

- Danny Goffey (Supergrass) – (drums)
- Thom Yorke – (piano) and Jonny Greenwood – (guitar) – (Radiohead)
- Paul McCartney – bass guitar
- Justin Hawkins and Dan Hawkins (the Darkness) – guitar
- Charlie Simpson – guitar (Busted)

Vocals:

- Tim Wheeler (Ash)
- Daniel Bedingfield
- Natasha Bedingfield
- Bono (U2)
- Busted
- Chris Martin (Coldplay)
- Dido – performed separately from a studio in Melbourne
- Dizzee Rascal – the only artist to add lyrics to the song
- Ms Dynamite
- Skye Edwards (Morcheeba)
- Estelle
- Grant Nicholas (Feeder)
- Neil Hannon (the Divine Comedy)
- Justin Hawkins (the Darkness)
- Jamelia
- Tom Chaplin (Keane)
- Tim Rice-Oxley (Keane)
- Beverley Knight
- Lemar
- Shaznay Lewis (formerly of All Saints)
- Katie Melua
- Róisín Murphy (formerly of Moloko)
- Gary Lightbody (Snow Patrol)
- Rachel Stevens (S Club)
- Joss Stone
- Sugababes (Mutya, Keisha and Heidi)
- The Thrills
- Turin Brakes
- Robbie Williams – performed separately from a studio in Los Angeles
- Will Young
- Fran Healy (Travis)
