= Take Me to the Clouds Above =

2004 single by LMC and U2

Single by LMC vs U2
- B-side: "The Feeling"
- Released: 26 January 2004
- Length: 2:53
- Label: All Around the World
- Songwriters: Bono; The Edge; Adam Clayton; Larry Mullen, Jr.; Narada Michael Walden; Shannon Rubicam; George Merrill
- Producer: LMC

LMC singles chronology
"Take Me to the Clouds Above" (2004)	"Don't Let Go" (2005)

U2 singles chronology
"Electrical Storm" (2002)	"Take Me to the Clouds Above" (2004)	"Vertigo" (2004)

"Take Me to the Clouds Above" is a song by British dance group LMC, credited to "LMC vs U2". The song interpolates Whitney Houston's 1986 hit "How Will I Know" (using only the first four lines) and samples Irish rock band U2's 1987 hit "With or Without You" (hence the credit). The vocals in the song were performed by Rachel McFarlane.

Released on 26 January 2004, "Take Me to the Clouds Above" peaked at number one on the UK Singles Chart for two weeks in February 2004. It became a worldwide hit as well, topping several dance charts and entering the top 20 in 10 other countries. In the United States, the song was a hit on dance radio, reaching number seven on the Billboard Dance Radio Airplay chart in May 2004.

== Track listings ==
UK maxi-CD single

1. "Take Me to the Clouds Above" (radio edit)
2. "Take Me to the Clouds Above" (The Mash Up Kids remix)
3. "Take Me to the Clouds Above" (extended mix)
4. "Take Me to the Clouds Above" (Audiolush remix)
5. "Take Me to the Clouds Above" (Lee S remix)
6. "Take Me to the Clouds Above" (Flip & Fill remix)

UK CD single

1. "Take Me to the Clouds Above" (radio edit)
2. "The Feeling"

US 12-inch single

A1. "Take Me to the Clouds Above" (extended)
A2. "Take Me to the Clouds Above" (Lee S remix)
B1. "Take Me to the Clouds Above" (Mash Up Kids remix)
B2. "The Feeling"

Australian CD single

1. "Take Me to the Clouds Above" (radio edit) – 2:50
2. "Take Me to the Clouds Above" (The Mash Up Kids remix) – 7:31
3. "Take Me to the Clouds Above" (Lee S remix) – 6:01
4. "Take Me to the Clouds Above" (Audiolush remix) – 6:21
5. "Take Me to the Clouds Above" (Flip & Fill remix) – 6:37
6. "Take Me to the Clouds Above" (Scott B remix) – 5:19
7. "The Feeling" – 5:17

== Charts ==
=== Weekly charts ===
Chart (2004)	Peak position
Australia (ARIA)	7
Australian Club Chart (ARIA)	3
Australian Dance (ARIA)	1
Austria (Ö3 Austria Top 40)	8
Belgium (Ultratop 50 Flanders)	16
Belgium (Ultratip Bubbling Under Wallonia)	1
Belgium Dance (Ultratop Flanders)	17
Denmark (Tracklisten)	9
Europe (Eurochart Hot 100)	4
France (SNEP)	21
Germany (GfK)	22
Hungary (Rádiós Top 40)	8
Hungary (Dance Top 40)	1
Hungary (Single Top 40)	8
Ireland (IRMA)	3
Ireland Dance (IRMA)	1
Italy (FIMI)	17
Netherlands (Dutch Top 40)	20
Netherlands (Single Top 100)	16
Norway (VG-lista)	18
Romania (Romanian Top 100)	30
Scottish Singles Sales (Official Charts)	1
Spain (Promusicae)	8
Sweden (Sverigetopplistan)	21
Switzerland (Schweizer Hitparade)	41
UK Singles (Official Charts)	1
UK Dance (Official Charts)	1
US Dance Radio Airplay (Billboard)	7
US Dance Singles Sales (Billboard)	24

=== Year-end charts ===
Chart (2004)	Position
Australia (ARIA)	80
Australian Club Chart (ARIA)	37
Australian Dance (ARIA)	6
Austria (Ö3 Austria Top 40)	67
Belgium (Ultratop 50 Flanders)	85
UK Singles (OCC)	13
US Dance Radio Airplay (Billboard)	31

== Certifications ==
Region	Certification	Certified units/sales
Australia (ARIA)	Gold	35,000^{^}
United Kingdom (BPI)	Platinum	600,000^{‡}
^{^} Shipments figures based on certification alone.^{‡} Sales+streaming figures based on certification alone.
