= Boogie Pimps =

Electronic music duo from Germany

- Also known as: Mark J Klak
- Origin: Erfurt, Thuringia, Germany
- Genre: Electronic
- Years active: 2000–present
- Label: Housesession
- Members: Mark J Klak; Black Sheep
- Past members: Mirko Jacob; Jon Henderson

Boogie Pimps are an electronic music duo from Erfurt, Germany. It was formed by two DJs: Mark J Klak and Mirko Jacob.

== History ==
Their collaboration started in 2000, when Mirko Jacob started performing in Klak's JoueJoueClub in Erfurt. Jacob has since left the group, and his place was filled by Australian-born Jon Henderson.

In Autumn 2003, Boogie Pimps released their first single, a remix of Jefferson Airplane's cover of The Great Society's "Somebody to Love". The single became a top ten hit in Australia and the United Kingdom, peaking at number ten on the ARIA Singles Chart and number three on the UK Singles Chart. Two music videos were made for "Somebody to Love". One features several infants sky diving out of an aeroplane towards a giant woman (Natasha Mealey) lying on a grassy hill country landscape in her underwear, singing the song.

Their second single, "Sunny" is also a cover, originally recorded by Bobby Hebb. The single became the Boogie Pimps' second top ten hit in the United Kingdom, peaking at number ten on the UK Singles Chart in May 2004. "Sunny" also became their second charting single in Australia, peaking at number 23 on the ARIA Singles Chart.

In 2004, they appeared on a white label record, which was not widely released, under the pseudonym 'Pimps Guerilla'. They performed songs such as "Right Out of Here" and "Make 'em Drop". While "Make 'em Drop" made it onto a few compilations, "Right Out of Here" is not commercially available, with the exception of white labels. This could be for legal reasons, as extracts of lyrics and melody were sampled from the end of Queen's "Bohemian Rhapsody".

== Discography ==
=== Albums ===
- 2012 - In Pimps We Trust - The Album

=== Singles ===
- 2003 - "Somebody to Love" - #3 UK, BPI: Silver, #10 AUS
- 2004 - "Sunny" - #10 UK, #23 AUS
- 2006 - "The Music in Me"
- 2007 - God's Pimp - The Electronic EP [on CD Pussy Lounge, Vol. 2]
- 2007 - "Then Came You"
- 2008 - "Gang Bang"
- 2009 - The Fresh EP
- 2009 - "Promised Land"
- 2009 - "PeeBoy"
- 2010 - "All Day and All of the Night"
- 2011 - "Knocking" feat. Darryl Pandy
- 2011 - Brown Paper EP
- 2012 - "24Seven"

=== Remixes ===
- Julien Scalzo & Ron Carroll - It's You (Boogie Pimps Remix) 2018
- Murano meets Toka feat. Dumbstruke - Nachtleben (Boogie Pimps Remix) 2012
- Agent Greg & Terri B! Time Won't Wait - Boogie Pimps Club Mix & Soulful House Mix 2012
- Tom Wax + Alex Stadler Welcome Back - Boogie Pimps Remix - 2011
- Tujamo Mombasa - Boogie Pimps Remix - 2011
- Sebastian Krieg & StrobeTwist in my Sobriety - Boogie Pimps Remix - 2010
- Francesco Gomez Primavera feat. Lety - Boogie Pimps Remix - 2010
- Kid Massive & Blacktron Turn it up - Boogie Pimps Remix - 2010
- Albin Myers + Dabruck & Klein Loenneberga - Boogie Pimps Remix - 2010
- Peter Brown & Jonathan Ulysses No Friends - Boogie Pimps Remix - 2010
- Dirty Funker Flat Beat - Boogie Pimps Remix - 2010
- Sharam (Deep Dish) feat. Kid Cudi She came along - Boogie Pimps Remix - 2009
- DBN Jack is Back - Boogie Pimps Remix - 2009
- Tune Brothers Finally 2009 - Boogie Pimps Remix - 2009
- Disco Dice Let's have a Party - Boogie Pimps Remix - 2009
- Rosenstolz Blaue Flecken - Boogie Pimps Remix - 2009
- Rosenstolz Blaue Flecken - Boogie Pimps Dub Remix - 2009
- DJ P.i.P. Yostar - Boogie Pimps Remix - 2009
- Marshall Jefferson vs. Noosa Heads Mushrooms - Boogie Pimps Rmx- 2008
- Twisted Society vs. Bilingual Freaks Nasty Seven - Boogie Pimps Remix - 2008
- De Jeugd van Tegenwoordig Watskeburt - Boogie Pimps Rmx - 2007
- Diego Ray Afterlite - Boogie Pimps Rmx - 2007
- Rosenstolz Wir sind wir - Boogie Pimps Rmx - 2006
- Shibuku Crazy Situation - Boogie Pimps Rmx - 2006
- Milk & Sugar What is Love - Boogie Pimps Rmx - 2005
- Villa & Gant Wind him up - Boogie Pimps Rmx - 2005
- Voodoo & Serano Don't you know - Boogie Pimps Rmx - 2005
- Rosenstolz Ich komm an Dir nicht weiter - Boogie Pimps Rmx - 2004
- KLF Build a fire - Boogie Pimps Rmx - 2004
- Kay Cee The Truth - Boogie Pimps Rmx - 2003
- Wackside vs. Chic Le Freak - Boogie Pimps Rmx - 2003
- Mondo Grande Mondo Grande - Boogie Pimps Rmx - 2003
- Jason Nevins I'm In Heaven - Boogie Pimps Rmx- 2003
