= 3 of a Kind (group) =

UK garage act

- Origin: United Kingdom
- Genres: 2-step garage
- Years active: 2004
- Labels: Relentless
- Members: Liana Caruana; Nicholas Gallante; Marc Portelli

3 of a Kind were a UK garage act, best known for their 2004 number one hit single, "Baby Cakes". Its members were Liana Caruana (a.k.a. Miz Tipzta), Nicholas Gallante (a.k.a. MC Devine) and Marc Portelli. Marc and Liana met the day they recorded "Baby Cakes".

== Career ==
=== 2004: "Baby Cakes" ===
"Baby Cakes" went straight to number 1 on the UK Singles Chart, and to number 3 on the Irish Singles Chart. It also just crept onto the Eurochart Hot 100 charting at number 91. The song also charted in Belgium, France, Netherlands and Sweden.

=== After Baby Cakes ===
3 of a Kind never released a follow-up to "Baby Cakes", making them one-hit wonders in the UK. A potential follow-up track, "Wink One Eye", was put forward as the second single, but was pulled from the new release listings and never rescheduled.

Nicholas Gallante appeared on Never Mind the Buzzcocks in November 2014, as part of the "Identity Parade" round and it was revealed he is now a party planner.

== Discography ==
=== Singles ===
Single with selected chart positions
Title	Year	Peak chart positions							Certifications	Album
Title	Year	UK	AUS	BEL (FL)	FRA	IRE	NL	SWE	Certifications	Album
"Baby Cakes"	2004	1	77	44	31	3	67	48	BPI: Silver	Non-album single
