= Baby Cakes (song) =

2004 single by 3 of a Kind

Single by 3 of a Kind
- Released: 9 August 2004
- Genre: UK garage
- Length: 6:20 (original); 2:37 (radio edit)
- Label: Relentless
- Songwriters: Liana Caruana; Nicholas Gallante; Marc Portelli

"Baby Cakes" is the only single released by British garage trio 3 of a Kind. It debuted atop the UK Singles Chart on 15 August 2004, becoming the band's only chart hit. Mixmag included "Baby Cakes" on their "40 of the best UK garage tracks released from 1995 to 2005" list. The music video shows the band in a cake shop and contains several double-entendres. A follow-up song, "Wink One Eye" was recorded but was never released.

== Background ==
The song's title was inspired by the 1989 American made-for TV movie Baby Cakes, which starred Ricki Lake in the title role. In the book 1000 UK Number One Hits, member Liana 'Miz Tipzta' Caruana said the song was written in 1998, and she came up with the title after having seen the film that mirrored her own experiences: "The words are written about someone I knew, but generally it's based on the film's love story. Basically, the girl knows the man is 'The One' but he doesn't realise it".

== Track listings ==
All tracks are written by Liana Caruana, Nicholas Gallante, Marc Portelli.

UK 12-inch single
No.	Title	Length
1.	"Baby Cakes" (full length original)
2.	"Baby Cakes" (radio edit)
3.	"Baby Cakes" (Qualifide remix)
4.	"Baby Cakes" (Angel Farringdon remix)

UK CD single
No.	Title	Length
1.	"Baby Cakes" (radio version)	2:36
2.	"Baby Cakes" (original)	6:16
3.	"Baby Cakes" (Qualifide remix)	5:37
4.	"Baby Cakes" (Angel Farringdon remix)	6:47
5.	"Baby Cakes" (CD-ROM video)

European CD single
No.	Title	Length
1.	"Baby Cakes" (radio edit)	2:36
2.	"Baby Cakes" (Qualifide remix)	5:37

Australian CD single
No.	Title	Length
1.	"Baby Cakes" (radio version)	2:37
2.	"Baby Cakes" (original)	6:20
3.	"Baby Cakes" (Qualifide remix)	5:42
4.	"Baby Cakes" (Angel Farringdon remix)	6:48

iTunes single
No.	Title	Length
1.	"Babycakes"	2:34

== Charts ==
=== Weekly charts ===
Chart (2004–2005)	Peak position
Australia (ARIA)	77
Australian Urban (ARIA)	20
Belgium (Ultratop 50 Wallonia)	44
CIS Airplay (TopHit)	29
Europe (Eurochart Hot 100)	4
France (SNEP)	31
Ireland (IRMA)	3
Netherlands (Single Top 100)	67
Russia Airplay (TopHit)	25
Scottish Singles Sales (Official Charts)	2
Sweden (Sverigetopplistan)	48
UK Singles (Official Charts)	1
UK Dance (Official Charts)	3

=== Year-end charts ===
Chart (2004)	Position
UK Singles (OCC)	12

Chart (2005)	Position
CIS Airplay (TopHit)	133
Russia Airplay (TopHit)	121

== Certifications ==
Region	Certification	Certified units/sales
United Kingdom (BPI)	Platinum	600,000^{‡}
^{‡} Sales+streaming figures based on certification alone.

== Release history ==
Region	Date	Format(s)	Label(s)	Ref.
United Kingdom	9 August 2004	12-inch vinyl; CD	Relentless	
Australia	13 September 2004	CD	Relentless	

== "Bbycakes" version ==
"Bbycakes"

Single by Mura Masa, Lil Uzi Vert, and PinkPantheress featuring Shygirl

from the album Demon Time
- Released: 22 February 2022
- Genre: Drill; hip hop
- Length: 2:53
- Label: Polydor; Anchor Point
- Songwriters: Liana Caruana; Alexander Crossan; Nicholas Gallante; Blane Muise; Marc Portelli; Victoria Walker; Symere Woods
- Producer: Mura Masa

Mura Masa singles chronology
"2gether" (2021)	"Bbycakes" (2022)	"Blessing Me" (2022)

Lil Uzi Vert singles chronology
"Demon High" (2021)	"Bbycakes" (2022)	"Heavy" (2022)

PinkPantheress singles chronology
"I Must Apologize" (2021)	"Bbycakes" (2022)	"Where You Are" (2022)

Shygirl singles chronology
"Cleo" (2021)	"Bbycakes" (2022)	"Firefly" (2022)

In February 2022, a version by Guernsey producer Mura Masa, American rapper Lil Uzi Vert and British singer-songwriter PinkPantheress featuring British rapper Shygirl was released as the third single from Mura Masa's third studio album Demon Time, titled "Bbycakes". The song peaked at number 71 on the UK Singles Chart, becoming Shygirl's first entry on the chart.

Mura Masa described the song as "a mission statement for the vicarious and playful nature that I think popular music needs to be looking to in order to soundtrack those crucial moments of fun and hedonism in an increasingly cynical culture".

=== Personnel ===
- Nathan Boddy – mixing engineer
- Liana Caruana – songwriting (sample)
- Nicholas Gallante – songwriting (sample)
- Ema Gaspar – art direction
- John Greenham – mastering engineer
- Lil Uzi Vert – songwriting, vocals
- Mura Masa – production, songwriting, synthesizer, drum programming, engineer
- PinkPantheress – songwriting, vocals
- Marc Portelli – songwriting (sample)
- Shygirl – songwriting, vocals

=== Charts ===
Chart (2022)	Peak position
New Zealand Hot Singles (RMNZ)	24
UK Singles (Official Charts)	71
