= Fightstar discography =

British band discography

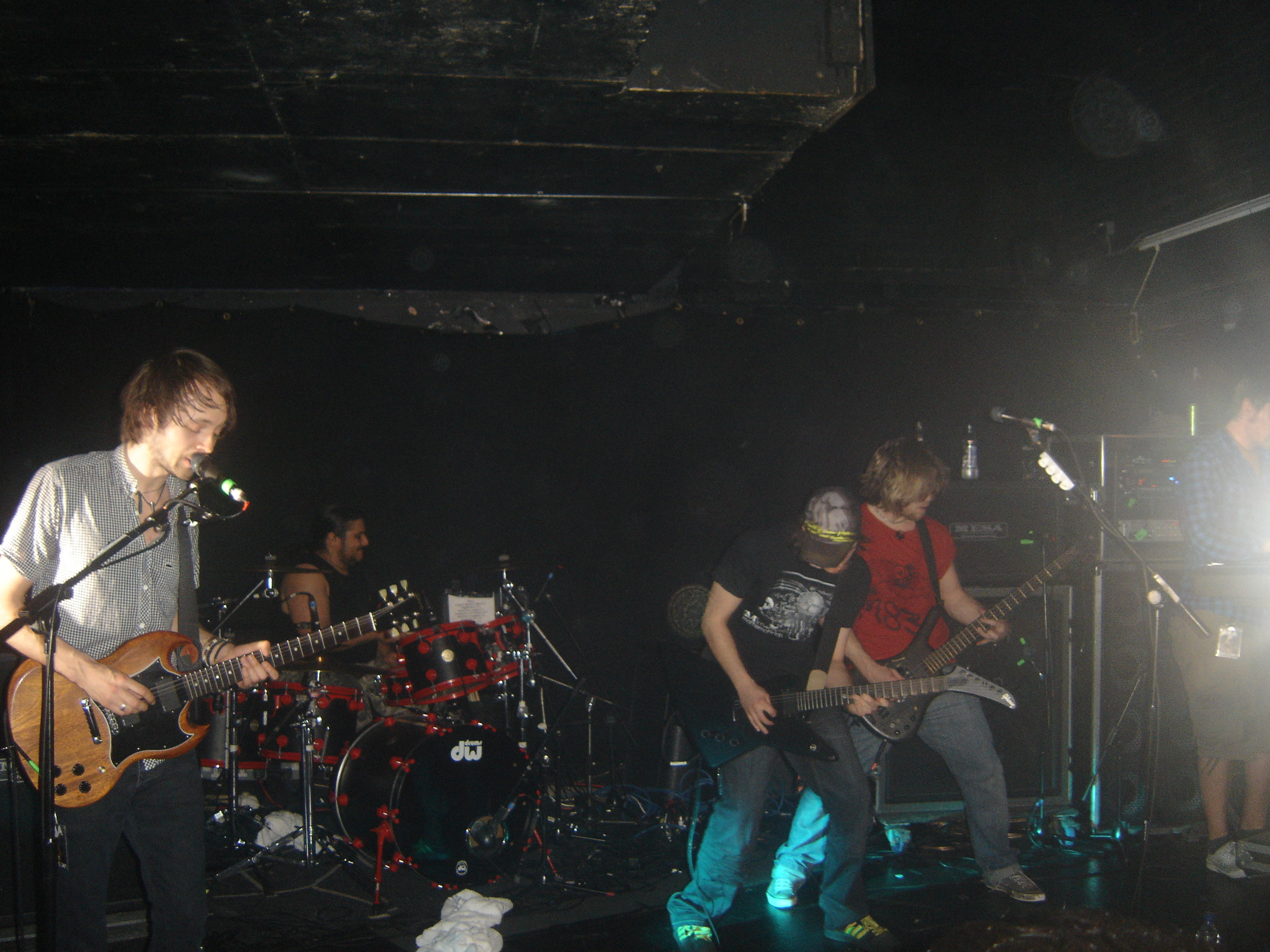
- Studio albums: 4
- Extended plays: 1
- Soundtrack albums: 1
- Compilation albums: 1
- Singles: 13
- B-sides: 28
- Music videos: 17

The discography of British post-hardcore band Fightstar consists of thirteen singles, one EP, four studio albums, one compilation album and seventeen music videos.

== Albums ==
Year	Album details	Peak chart positions	
Year	Album details	UK	IRL
2006	Grand Unification: Released: 13 March 2006; Label: Island; Formats: CD, digital download	28	42
2007	One Day Son, This Will All Be Yours: Released: 24 September 2007; Label: Gut; Formats: CD + DVD, digital download	27	—
2009	Be Human: Released: 20 April 2009; Label: Search and Destroy; Formats: CD, digital download	20	—
2015	Behind the Devil's Back: Released: 16 October 2015; Label: Self-released; Formats: CD, vinyl, digital download	19	—

== Extended plays ==
Year	Album	Peak chart positions
Year	Album	UK
2005	They Liked You Better When You Were Dead: Debut EP; Released: 28 February 2005; Label: Sandwich Leg Records; Formats: Digipak, digital download	86

== Compilation albums ==
Year	Album	Peak chart positions
Year	Album	UK
2008	Alternate Endings: B-sides compilation album; Released: 11 August 2008; Label: Gut Records; Formats: CD, digital download	85

== Singles ==
Single	Year	Peak chart positions					Album
Single	Year	UK	UK Rock	UK Indie	IRL	SCO	Album
2005	"Palahniuk's Laughter"	86	—	—	—	88	They Liked You Better When You Were Dead
2005	"Paint Your Target"	9	—	—	29	6	Grand Unification
2005	"Grand Unification Part 1"	20	—	—	41	18	Grand Unification
2006	"Waste a Moment"	29	1	—	—	20	Grand Unification
2006	"Hazy Eyes"	47	2	—	—	34	Grand Unification
2007	"99"	—	—	—	—	—	One Day Son, This Will All Be Yours
2007	"We Apologise for Nothing"	63	3	1	—	24	One Day Son, This Will All Be Yours
2007	"Deathcar"	92	2	2	—	26	One Day Son, This Will All Be Yours
2008	"Floods"	114	2	2	—	32	One Day Son, This Will All Be Yours
2008	"I Am the Message"	—	1	4	—	36	One Day Son, This Will All Be Yours
2008	"The English Way"	62	2	2	—	26	Be Human
2009	"Mercury Summer"	46	1	3	—	7	Be Human
2009	"Never Change"	132	4	11	—	22	Be Human
2009	"A City on Fire"	116	4	10	—	97	Be Human
2015	"Animal"	—	—	—	—	—	Behind the Devil's Back
2015	"Sharp Tongue"	—	—	—	—	—	Behind the Devil's Back

== Other songs ==
Song	Notes	Appearance
"Leper Messiah"	Metallica cover	Kerrang!s Remastered (Metallica Tribute)
"My Own Summer (Shove It)"	Deftones cover	Kerrang!s High Voltage (A Brief History of Rock)
"Fear of the Dark"	Iron Maiden cover	Kerrang!s Maiden Heaven (Iron Maiden Tribute)
"Battlefield"	Jordin Sparks cover	Radio 1 Live Lounge
"Sex on Fire"	Kings of Leon cover	The Sun Online
"Black Hole Sun"	Soundgarden cover	Live at Download Festival 2009
"A.M. 180"	Grandaddy cover	Colin Murray Session for BBC Radio 1
"Hurt"	Nine Inch Nails cover	Radio 1 Live
"She Drove Me to Daytime Television"	Funeral for a Friend cover	

== Music videos ==
Year	Song	Director
2005	"Palahniuk's Laughter"	Dan Haigh
2005	"Paint Your Target" (Original Version)	Dan Haigh
2005	"Paint Your Target" (Second Version)	
2005	"Grand Unification Pt 1"	
2006	"Waste a Moment"	
2006	"Hazy Eyes"	
2007	"99"	
2007	"We Apologise for Nothing"	
2007	"Deathcar"	
2008	"Floods"	
2008	"I Am the Message"	
2008	"The English Way"	Paul Morricone
2009	"Mercury Summer"	Ben Strebel and Dylan Byrne
2009	"Never Change"	
2009	"A City on Fire"	Ben Thornley and Paul Burrows
2015	"Sink with the Snakes"	Shane Davey
2015	"Overdrive"	Shane Davey
2015	"Behind the Devil's Back"	Shane Davey
