= Deathcar =

Single by Fightstar

from the album One Day Son, This Will Be All Yours
- Released: 3 December 2007 (UK)
- Recorded: 2007
- Genre: Alternative metal; metalcore
- Length: 3:57
- Songwriters: Charlie Simpson, Alex Westaway
- Producer: Matt Wallace

Fightstar singles chronology
"We Apologise for Nothing" (2007)	"Deathcar" (2007)	"Floods" (2008)

"Deathcar" is the third single from Fightstar's second album One Day Son, This Will All Be Yours, and was released on 3 December 2007.

The single was the first release on the VinylDisc format in the UK. The VinylDisc includes the title track, plus 3 extra exclusive tracks. "99" was recorded at the band's sold-out show at London's Koko, and the two other tracks, "Nerv/Seele" and "Shinji lkari", are new tracks recorded specifically for this release and both are inspired by and take their names from the classic anime Neon Genesis Evangelion. Only 4000 copies were manufactured. Another track, "Deathcar (Live)" was available as a download exclusively for iTunes. This track was also recorded at the sold-out show at Koko.

== Composition ==
One of the most heavy songs from the album, it includes prolonged harsh vocals and heavy guitar work. It was inspired by a harrowing news item on Chinese human meat wagons, as well as the end of one of Simpson's relationships. "Deathcars are these vans the Chinese have and, if they need an organ donor for someone, then they execute death-row prisoners in the vans and bring the organs to accident victims," explains Simpson. "I heard about them on the news at the same time as I heard that my ex-girlfriend was going out with someone new. I've sort of merged him and the deathcar together. I'm driving and he's in the back...."

== Reception ==
In 21 November's issue of Kerrang! magazine, Deathcar was voted the No. 1 track to download that week. The song also makes an appearance on the soundtrack to the 2007 fictional movie Resident Evil: Extinction.

== Track listing ==
VinylDisc

- CD Side
  1. "Deathcar"
  2. "99" (Live) ^
  3. "Nerv/Seele"
  4. "Shinji Ikari" (unlisted track)
- Vinyl Side
  1. "Shinji Ikari"

Digital download

1. "Deathcar"
2. "Deathcar" (Live) ^

iTunes Exclusive

1. "Deathcar"
2. "Nerv/Seele"
3. "Deathcar" (Live) ^
4. "99" (Live) ^

^ Live tracks performed at Koko, London.

== Video ==
On 21 November, the official video (which had a small budget of £500, hence the poor sound quality) was released on the band's MySpace, and debuted on the UK music channel Scuzz on 25 November. Throughout the video, paramedics can be seen trying to catch Charlie Simpson and take him to a death car. Dan, Al and Omar are the paramedics. The video also shows Omar driving the van. Portions of the video see the band with each other playing the song inside a small room. There has since been an uncut version released by the band which was 'too bloody' to be shown where they cut Charlie's heart out and it can be seen in one of the member's hands. This can be found on YouTube and on the band's Myspace.

== Chart performance ==
Chart (2007)	Peak position
Scottish Singles Sales (Official Charts)	26
UK Singles (Official Charts)	92
UK Indie (Official Charts)	2
UK Rock & Metal (Official Charts)	2
