= Never Change (song) =

Single by Fightstar

from the album Be Human
- Released: 20 July 2009 (UK)
- Recorded: 2008
- Length: 2:59
- Songwriters: Charlie Simpson, Alex Westaway, Dan Haigh, Omar Abidi
- Producers: Carl Bown, Fightstar

Fightstar singles chronology
"Mercury Summer" (2009)	"Never Change" (2009)	"A City on Fire" (2009)

"Never Change" is the third single to be taken from Fightstar's third studio album, Be Human, and was released on 20 July 2009.

The music video has appeared on Kerrang!, MTV2 and Scuzz.

== Track listing ==
CD:

1. "Never Change" (Radio Edit) - 2:58
2. "A Short History of the World" - 4:14

Digital Download

1. "Never Change" (Radio Edit) - 2:58
2. "Never Change" (Acoustic) - 3:06
3. "Never Change" (Album Demo) - 3:32
4. "A Short History of The World" - 4:14
5. "These Days" - 3:20
- "These Days" is a recording of a song written by and was originally recorded by Jackson Browne.
- "A Short History of the World" features the lyrics "Intellects vast and cool and unsympathetic, regarded this earth with envious eyes, and slowly and surely drew their plans against us" which is a quote taken directly from War of the Worlds.

== Chart performance ==
Chart (2009)	Peak position
Scottish Singles Sales (Official Charts)	22
UK Singles (Official Charts)	132
UK Indie Chart (Official Charts)	11
UK Rock Chart (Official Charts)	4

== Personnel ==
- Charlie Simpson — vocals, guitar, keys
- Alex Westaway – guitar, vocals
- Dan Haigh — bass guitar
- Omar Abidi — drums, percussion

=== Other contributors ===
- Produced by Carl Bown and Fightstar
- Engineered by Chris Potter
- Mixed by David Bendeth
- Recorded at Treehouse Studios, Chesterfield, Derbyshire
- Artwork by Ryohei Hase
