= Grand Unification Part 1 =

Single by Fightstar

from the album Grand Unification
- Released: 31 October 2005 (UK)
- Recorded: 2005
- Genre: Alternative metal; post-hardcore
- Length: 3:19
- Label: Island
- Songwriters: Charlie Simpson; Alex Westaway; Dan Haigh; Omar Abidi
- Producer: Colin Richardson

Fightstar singles chronology
"Paint Your Target" (2005)	"Grand Unification Part 1" (2005)	"Waste a Moment" (2005)

"Grand Unification Part 1" is the second single from the Fightstar album Grand Unification. There are two videos to this song. One of the videos is a mixture of Fightstar playing in a, what would seem to be some sort of cave or room, as well as scenes from Dragon Ball Z. The second video is the band playing in the same sort of cave/room but without the Dragon Ball Z scenes. It has since been revealed that the location used was the same as that used by The Prodigy in the controversial video for their song Firestarter, and this has been interpreted as a tribute on the part of Fightstar to The Prodigy.

Much like "Paint Your Target", there are 2 recorded versions of Grand Unification Part 1. One, recorded by Chris Sheldon, was released as a single and appeared on the Dragonball Z version of the video. The other version, which appears on Grand Unification, was recorded by Colin Richardson and appeared on the video without the Dragon Ball Z scenes.

== Track listing ==
CD single
No.	Title	Length
1.	"Grand Unification Pt. 1"	3:19
2.	"The Days I Recall Being Wonderful" (Last Days of April cover)	4:25
3.	"Waste a Moment" (Acoustic)	3:32

7" vinyl
No.	Title	Length
1.	"Grand Unification Pt. 1"	3:19
2.	"Palahniuk's Laughter" (Live Studio Version)	3:56

DVD single
No.	Title	Length
1.	"Grand Unification Pt. 1" (Music Video)	3:19
2.	"Take You Home"	3:24
3.	"Japanese Tour Footage" (Video)	10:00

== Chart performance ==
Chart (2005)	Peak position
Ireland (IRMA)	41
Scottish Singles Sales (Official Charts)	18
UK Singles (Official Charts)	20
