= Behind the Devil's Back =

Studio album by Fightstar
- Released: 16 October 2015
- Recorded: 2015
- Genres: Metalcore; alternative metal; post-hardcore; post-rock
- Length: 36:29
- Label: Warner
- Producers: Fightstar, Carl Bown

Fightstar chronology
Be Human (2009)	Behind the Devil's Back (2015)

Singles from Behind the Devil's Back
- 1. "Animal" Released: 26 July 2015; 2. "Sharp Tongue" Released: 11 September 2015

Behind the Devil's Back is the fourth studio album by British rock band Fightstar. The album was released on 16 October 2015 via the band's own record label - distributed by Warner Music. The album was funded via a Pledge Music campaign, which launched in July 2015.

This was the last Fightstar album released before lead singer Charlie Simpson returned to his old band Busted that November.

== Background ==
September 2014 saw the band's Facebook profile updated with a new default picture and cover photo; both of which featured Fightstar artwork within an 'X' shape. On 25 September, the band's official website was updated to include a countdown timer accompanied by text that simply read "News..." The timer ended on 13 October 2014; with the announcement of a ten-year anniversary show at London's Forum. A statement from the band followed: "It has been 10 years since the inception of this band and we wanted to celebrate it with a bang. We want to thank you all for your love and support over the past ten years and we can't wait to commemorate this milestone with you guys." The concert sold out in minutes, and due to demand the band added a second concert at O2 Academy Brixton. They also announced additional dates in Birmingham, Glasgow and Manchester.

On 23 February 2015 at Birmingham's Digbeth Institute, Charlie Simpson announced that Fightstar were working on new music due to be released later that year.

On 22 July 2015, it was announced Fightstar would be releasing their fourth studio album, entitled 'Behind the Devil's Back' on 16 October 2015, with a string of UK dates to follow in support of the release. A limited edition box set version of the album is available from the band's official store. This contains a signed hard copy of the album, a T-shirt with album artwork, unique and numbered art print, a Fightstar shot glass and Fightstar own brand hot sauce, all contained in a glossy box.

On 26 July 2015, Daniel P Carter of the BBC Radio 1 Rock Show premiered 'Animal', the first new song released by the band in 5 years.

== Writing and recording ==
On 12 May 2015 Simpson revealed via Instagram that the band had returned to the studio to work on new material with long-time producer Carl Bown and consequently began using Twitter to provide updates on the progress of the album's recording process. Bassist Dan Haigh took to Twitter and Instagram on 20 August to begin posting brief video clips of recording sessions for 'Behind the Devil's Back' in the build-up to the album's release.

Simpson claimed that the album consists of material "amalgamated" during the band's five-year hiatus, and that the release was initially planned as an EP, although recording did not begin until 2015. In interview, Simpson claimed that his favourite track off the record was 'Sharp Tongue', also noting that drummer Omar Abidi's favourite was 'Dive', a track which he stated "really allowed [me] to get lost in the sound."

The mindset of the band going into the creation of 'Behind the Devil's Back' was different to the approach they had taken on any other album due to the ethos of what Simpson describes as wanting to "keep moving in a new direction", with the guitarist and vocalist explaining that "our fans are the ones who we're making this album for. We're not going out with this record to try and conquer the world, we're trying to reinvigorate our fan-base and really do this for them."

'Behind the Devil's Back' is also notable as being the first Fightstar album on which all four members of the band share songwriting credits and regarding the writing process of the album, bassist Dan Haigh stated that "some of the traditional writing goals were altered for this record" as "all boundaries were removed" and "the full extent of the individuals within the band's influences were allowed to come to the table", which he intimated was one reason for the heavy sound of the album. This sentiment was echoed by guitarist Alex Westaway who explained that the material may have taken such a direction as a result of the five-year "drought in [their] creativity on the heavier side of things", as during the band's hiatus their respective musical projects greatly differed stylistically from the sound generally associated with Fightstar. Simpson also attributed the album's sound to the band utilizing 7-string guitars for the first time, stating that as a result the album was "much heavier by its very nature".

Another significant element of the album's composition was the introduction of synthesizers and electronic instrumentation for the first time on a Fightstar release. Following Haigh and Westaway's work within electronic side project Gunship, the presence of synthesizers was consequently an element available within the studio during writing sessions, with Haigh stating that it "evolved naturally" and "slowly became the thing we were doing this record with" in order to "augment what we were doing". Electronic instrumentation features on all ten of the album's tracks; making use of analogue synthesizers, sequencers, custom patches and filter sweeping techniques.

== Artwork ==
Behind the Devil's Back features artwork from artist Daniel Conway, who had previously provided artwork for Fightstar albums Grand Unification, One Day Son, This Will All Be Yours, and Alternate Endings. The front cover features Conway's work Scorched Earth (2012); flipping the CD case reveals an alternative version of this work that he created for this album, which depicts "the image change from life to death", with the tree having perished, and the lava covering more of the visible terrain.

== Reception ==
Professional ratings
Review scores
Source	Rating
Bring the Noise	9/10
The Soundboard	8/10
Sound Fiction	9.2/10

The album was included at number 41 on Rock Sound's top 50 releases of 2015 list.

== Track listing ==
No.	Title	Writer(s)	Length
1.	"Sharp Tongue"	Simpson • Westaway • Haigh • Abidi	4:05
2.	"Murder All Over"	Simpson • Westaway	3:23
3.	"Behind the Devil's Back"	Simpson • Westaway • Haigh • Abidi	3:15
4.	"The Blackest of Birds"	Simpson • Haigh	4:28
5.	"Overdrive"	Simpson • Westaway	3:44
6.	"More Human Than Human"	Simpson • Westaway	3:42
7.	"Animal"	Simpson • Westaway • Haigh • Abidi	3:12
8.	"Titan"	Simpson • Westaway • Haigh • Abidi	4:12
9.	"Sink with the Snakes"	Simpson • Westaway • Haigh • Abidi	2:48
10.	"Dive"	Simpson • Abidi	3:49

== Personnel ==
Fightstar

- Charlie Simpson – vocals, guitar, keyboards
- Alex Westaway – vocals, guitar, synthesizers
- Dan Haigh – bass guitar, synthesizers
- Omar Abidi – drums, percussion

Other

- Daniel Conway, digital painting “Scorched Earth” (2013) - album artwork

== Tour ==
In support of the album, the band embarked on a nine-date tour across the United Kingdom in October 2015. The setlist consisted of several tracks from the album as well as a number of fan favourite tracks and singles. Support was from Arcane Roots and Making Monsters.

=== Setlist ===
1. "Sleep Well Tonight"
2. "Sharp Tongue"
3. "Build an Army"
4. "Paint Your Target"
5. "Behind the Devil's Back"
6. "Sink with the Snakes"
7. "War Machine"
8. "Grand Unification (Part 1)"
9. "99"
10. "Palahniuk's Laughter"
11. "Deathcar"
12. "Wake Up"
13. "Animal"
14. "Mono"

=== Dates ===
Date	City	Country	Venue
17 October 2015	London	England	The Troxy
18 October 2015	Southampton	England	University of Southampton
19 October 2015	Exeter	England	Lemon Grove
21 October 2015	Wolverhampton	England	Wulfrun Hall
22 October 2015	Norwich	England	The Waterfront
24 October 2015	Manchester	England	The Ritz
25 October 2015	Newcastle	England	Northumbria Student Union
27 October 2015	Edinburgh	Scotland	The Liquid Room
28 October 2015	Aberdeen	Scotland	The Garage

== Charts ==
Chart (2015)	Peak position
Scottish Albums (OCC)	15
UK Albums (Official Charts)	19
UK Independent Albums (OCC)	1
UK Rock Albums (OCC)	1

== Release history ==
Region	Date	Label	Format	Catalogue #	Ref.
United Kingdom	16 October 2015	Warner Music	Digital download, CD	None	
United Kingdom	6 November 2015	Warner Music	Deluxe limited edition box set	None	
