= Be Human (album) =

Studio album by Fightstar
- Released: 20 April 2009
- Recorded: August–December 2008
- Studios: Treehouse Studios, Chesterfield and AIR Studios, London
- Genres: Post-hardcore; alternative rock; symphonic rock
- Length: 46:13 (Original); 59:03 (Deluxe)
- Labels: Search and Destroy/PIAS
- Producers: Carl Bown, Fightstar

Fightstar chronology
Alternate Endings (2008)	Be Human (2009)	Behind the Devil's Back (2015)

Singles from Be Human
- 1. "The English Way" Released: 3 November 2008; 2. "Mercury Summer" Released: 6 April 2009; 3. "Never Change" Released: 20 July 2009; 4. "A City on Fire" Released: 21 December 2009

Be Human is the third studio album by British rock band Fightstar, released on 20 April 2009 through independent label Search and Destroy Records, itself distributed by PIAS Recordings. The album was recorded between August and December 2008 in Chesterfield and London, with the band co-producing alongside Laruso guitarist Carl Bown. Additional recording took place Air Studios with string composer Audrey Riley. Unlike their first two studio releases, Daniel Conway did not contribute to the album's artwork, instead the band approached Ryohei Hase who digitally painted the cover art.

Four singles were released from Be Human, including "The English Way" and "Mercury Summer" prior to the album's release. Drawing praise from many critics, the album entered the UK Albums Chart at number 20, making it their highest charting album to date. The iTunes digital download includes a bonus track which is an acoustic version of "Unfamiliar Ceilings", the final track on the band's previous studio album, performed with former XFM presenter Katie P. A deluxe edition was later re-released on 1 March 2010, including four newly recorded tracks, a DVD of the band's live unplugged performance at the Picturedrome Theatre in Northampton, new cover art and also a revised track listing.

== Background, writing and recording ==
The band first mentioned that they were working on new material back in March 2008. They confirmed that after completing their tour with Brigade, they would begin writing during the summer and would be posting updates for fans with video diaries from the studio. Recording took place, for the most part, at Treehouse Studios in Chesterfield, the personal studio of co-producer and friend, Carl Bown. Drum tracks for the album were recorded at Steelworks Studios in Sheffield, and split between Omar and Charlie due to Omar suffering from a broken wrist. Recording sessions began in August 2008, and were due to finish in November. The band's vocalist, guitarist and songwriter Charlie Simpson confirmed tentative working titles as "War Machine", "English Way" and "Mercury Summer". He mentioned the former would have a distinct "rock opera" feel to it with heavy string sections.

After the bulk of recording had been completed, the band went to Air Studios (where film scores for Pirates of the Caribbean and Batman Begins had been composed by Hans Zimmer) to record the string sections with Audrey Riley. Simpson later commented that "it was great to bring that element, that classical side, into it. It adds so much." Leading up to the album's release, the band indicated that the sound would be "quite different" to their earlier material with the inclusion of orchestral and choral parts. Despite this, it was noted that it would still remain "Fightstar", with their trademark dark and heavy elements. The band also regarded the lyrical content as their "most positive" to date and were pleased that the finished product was "everything we wanted".

== Promotion and release ==
The first single from the album was "The English Way", released along with a music video on 3 November 2008. It marked a degree of experimentation for the band, with the addition of choir vocals for the first time. The CD single had a demo titled "Colours Bleed", which had its name changed to "Colours Bleed to Red" for the release of the album. "Mercury Summer" was made available for streaming on 17 February 2009. The video for the second single, "Mercury Summer", premiered on 25 February, whilst the physical CD single release was on 6 April. The song further showcased a more experimental direction, with a more upbeat and melodic sound than found in older material.

In a live web chat with fans on the official Fightstar forum on 9 April 2009, the band confirmed that the next single is expected to be "Never Change". Throughout April, the band went on a UK tour with In Case of Fire and Laruso. Be Human was released on 20 April. The band shot the video for "Never Change" on 3 May, as the band confirmed at their gig in Exeter Lemon Grove on 4 May. It was released on 20 July 2009, with the band working alongside the same directors for the video as they did with "Mercury Summer". They appeared at the Reading and Leeds Festivals in August 2009.

== Deluxe edition ==
The deluxe edition cover art as designed by guitarist Alex Westaway.

The band confirmed in late 2009 that Be Human would be re-released as a deluxe version containing four or five new songs. One of the new songs could be a cover version of Jordin Sparks' "Battlefield", which the band performed informally earlier in the year in the BBC Radio 1 Live Lounge. The cover was met with great approval and Sparks herself said on radio that she was a fan of Fightstar and believed they should cover the song.

On 12 October the band posted pictures on their Myspace site from their latest music video shoot for new song "A City on Fire". The song subsequently was played for the first time during Fearne Cotton's show on Radio 1 on 19 October and the official video premiered on the band's MySpace on 24 October, which was directed by the team at Sitcom Soldiers. The single was released as a digital download on 20 December, while the band have since confirmed the deluxe re-release of Be Human will be available in February 2010.

On 13 January, guitarist Alex Westaway posted an update on the band's official website. He confirmed that the deluxe re-release is scheduled for release on or around 1 March 2010. He also confirmed he had personally designed new artwork for the repackaging and that a live DVD would also be included. The band's unplugged performance was shot in December 2009 at the Picturedome in Northampton (Westaway's home town). The DVD also includes the music videos for "The English Way", "Mercury Summer", "Never Change" and "A City on Fire". The four newly recorded tracks were confirmed as, "A City on Fire", "Its Blood Is Black", "28k Resolution" and "Mvua Nyeusi", with the whole track listing re-organised.

== Critical reception ==
Professional ratings
Review scores
Source	Rating
AbsolutePunk	84%
Big Cheese	4/5 stars
God is in the TV	4/5 stars
In the News	9/10
Kerrang!	4/5 stars
Melodic.net	4/5 stars
Q	4/5 stars
Rock Sound	8/10
Sputnikmusic	4.5/5

The album was met with positive critical response upon its release, with many reviews praising the band for experimenting with the orchestration elements and ultimately, expanding their sound as a whole.

Anton Djamoos of AbsolutePunk rated the album 84% and stated that it's time for the US to "finally take notice of Fightstar". Commenting on the band's progression, he stated; "Be Human is a departure from the general body of work we've seen in the past from the band. They break from their own norm with several orchestral elements to make the album sound more full and let the music hit even harder; they're pushing their creative boundaries and it works for the most part". He also added that Fightstar "is poised to finally see some long-overdue respect". In the News writer Lewis Bazley was highly favourable in his review and awarded a score of 9/10. He described the album as, "Bold, grandiose - a career high". He also stated the album would have huge reply value and summarised his review by adding; "With Fightstar having released this LP themselves and the aforementioned orchestra appearing on almost every track, it's a 50-minute statement of intent, a dozen songs in which the four-piece declare 'this is the band we've always wanted to be'. From the opening, orchestral burst of 'Calling on All Stations', the Death Cab-meets-Cure emotional theatrics of 'Give Me the Sky' and the mournful movie script ending of 'Follow Me into the Darkness', immersing yourself in the bipolar world of Be Human is an exhilarating, sometimes heartstopping journey to revisit for years to come".

Emma Johnston, a critic for British rock magazine Kerrang!, awarded the album an "excellent" four K rating and commented the band had "created a huge-hearted, earnest, wonderfully over the top album". She was particularly impressed with the variety offered on the record; "Be Human is a record glorying in its own bombast, as Fightstar throw as many orchestral and choral flourishes as their muscular, solemnly heavy rock as it could take without drowning". Victoria Durham of Rock Sound stated, "By now, we know that Fightstar are capable of great things and they're back in business, with nothing less than Hollywood movie scores in their sights". Awarding the album 8/10, she made comparisons with Biffy Clyro and Silverchair whilst complimenting the broad range found among the songs; "If 'Chemical Blood' and 'Damocles' are the pummelling rock epics, then 'Tonight We Burn' and 'Give Me The Sky' are the experimental, pop-fuelled gems. Fightstar have always been ambitious; now they’re on their way to becoming truly brilliant". Matt Mason of Q magazine, while awarding the album an "excellent" four star review, wrote, "be human reveals itself to be a more complex – and captivating – creature. Bold juxtapositioning of operatic arrangements, electronic interludes and juddering hardcore riffs." Craig Broad of God Is in the TV noted that his first impressions of the album were, "how grandiose it actually is." Awarding four stars, he praised the band for expanding their sound; "Be Human, ultimately, is a band comfortable with their abilities but pushing and evolving to become something more. Let's just hope that they continue to push on and be one of bright stars of British alternative music." Jared Ponton of Sputnikmusic, writing a review on the deluxe edition, said that the re-release, "actually improves on an already-excellent album." Awarding a "superb" 4.5 out of five rating, he also added, "Unlike many bands that have shot for that sense of cinematic urgency and "epic" undertones for their music in the past, Be Human saw Fightstar largely succeeding, by shining a beam of new light on the premises of the band's unique, post-hardcore sound."

== Track listing ==
All lyrics written by Charlie Simpson and Alex Westaway; music composed by Fightstar.

No.	Title	Length
1.	"Calling on All Stations"	3:26
2.	"The English Way"	3:33
3.	"War Machine"	4:48
4.	"Never Change"	3:02
5.	"Colours Bleed to Red"	3:19
6.	"The Whisperer"	3:59
7.	"Mercury Summer"	3:07
8.	"Give Me the Sky"	4:01
9.	"Chemical Blood"	3:52
10.	"Tonight We Burn"	3:51
11.	"Damocles"	3:36
12.	"Follow Me into the Darkness"	5:44
Total length:		46:13

iTunes edition
No.	Title	Length
13.	"Unfamiliar Ceilings" (Acoustic)	4:07

Deluxe Edition
No.	Title	Length
1.	"War Machine"	4:48
2.	"A City on Fire"	3:07
3.	"The English Way"	3:33
4.	"28k Resolution"	3:16
5.	"Chemical Blood"	3:52
6.	"Calling on All Stations"	3:26
7.	"Mercury Summer"	3:07
8.	"Give Me the Sky"	4:01
9.	"Never Change"	3:02
10.	"Tonight We Burn"	3:51
11.	"The Whisperer"	3:59
12.	"Its Blood Is Black"	3:29
13.	"Colours Bleed to Red"	3:19
14.	"Damocles"	3:36
15.	"Mvua Nyeusi"	3:24
16.	"Follow Me into the Darkness"	5:44
17.	"Battlefield" (iTunes Exclusive)"	3:21
Total length:		59:03

Unplugged at the Picturedrome DVD
No.	Title	Length
1.	"Palahniuk's Laughter"	4:26
2.	"99"	4:17
3.	"The English Way"	3:32
4.	"Our Last Common Ancestor"	3:38
5.	"Sleep Well Tonight"	4:45
6.	"Battlefield"	4:00
7.	"Vincent"	4:45
8.	"Cross Out the Stars"	5:18

=== B-sides ===
- "Colours Bleed" (Demo)
- "Drown"
- "Hide and Seek" (Imogen Heap cover)
- "Athea"
- "We Left Tracks of Fire"
- "A Short History of the World"
- "These Days" (Jackson Browne cover)
- "Vincent" (Don McLean cover)

== Personnel ==
Adapted from the Be Human album credits.

Fightstar

- Charlie Simpson – lead vocals, rhythm guitar, keyboards, drums, lyrics
- Alex Westaway – lead guitar, vocals, lyrics
- Dan Haigh – bass guitar, design
- Omar Abidi – drums, percussion

Additional musicians

- Audrey Riley – conductor, cello
- Joeri de Vente – french horn
- Rowland Sutherland – flute, alto flute
- Christian Forshaw – clarinet, bass clarinet

± other orchestra members not credited

Choir

- Caius Fitzgerald
- Luke Bowen
- Andrew Armstrong
- Josh Rees-Jones
- Rugby School Chamber Choir

Production

- Carl Bown – producer, engineering, mixing
- Fightstar – co-production
- Jim Pinder – Pro Tools assistance
- John Davies – mastering
- Ryohei Hase – artwork
- Tristan Lillingston – A&R

== Charts ==
Chart (2009)	Peak position
Scottish Albums (OCC)	26
UK Albums (OCC)	20
UK Independent Albums (OCC)	1
UK Rock Albums (OCC)	1

== Accolades ==
Publication	Country	Accolade	Year	Rank
Rock Sound	UK	Top Seventy Five Albums of the Year	2009	50

== Release history ==
Region	Date	Label	Format	Catalogue #	Ref.
United Kingdom	20 April 2009	Search and Destroy	Digital Download, Compact Disc	SADCDA002	
United Kingdom	1 March 2010	Search and Destroy	Compact Disc + DVD	SADCDX002	
Australia	20 November 2009	Shock	Compact Disc	CTX537CD_1	
Worldwide	16 October 2009	Cooking Vinyl	Compact Disc, Digital Download	COOKCD504; COOKDL504	
