= Alternate Endings =

Compilation album by Fightstar
- Released: 11 August 2008
- Recorded: 2004–2008
- Genres: Post-hardcore; emo
- Length: 55:18
- Label: Gut

Fightstar chronology
One Day Son, This Will All Be Yours (2007)	Alternate Endings (2008)	Be Human (2009)

Professional ratings
Review scores
Source	Rating
BBC	favourable

Alternate Endings is a compilation album by English post-hardcore band Fightstar, released 11 August 2008 on Gut Records. It features previously unreleased material, b-sides, covers and live radio recordings from the previous four years.

== Overview ==
The track "Amethyst" is taken from the band's debut EP, They Liked You Better When You Were Dead, where it appeared as track five. A hidden track titled "Hazy Eyes" follows directly after it. The version of "Amethyst" on this album is the same as the EP version, with "Hazy Eyes" included at the end of the track. It is unclear whether this was an error or intentional. The songs "Shinji Ikari", "Fight for US" and "NERV/SEELE" are inspired by the anime Neon Genesis Evangelion. Shinji Ikari is the show's main protagonist, while NERV and SEELE are the two opposing factions in the series. The cover of "Breaking the Law" originally appeared on Higher Voltage!: Another Brief History of Rock.

The album also features an enhanced section with various videos, featuring backstage footage, music video's and a video of the band answering questions asked by the fans.

The digital download version of the album has a slightly different track order, where track 4 is replaced, instead of "Amethyst", "Flotation Therapy" appears which was a b-side to "Floods".

The band's drummer Omar Abidi has stated that the release was a decision made by Gut Records as a way of getting "every last drop of money out of us" before the band went independent. He expressed that, after only two albums, it felt somewhat arrogant for the band to release such a collection.

== Track listing ==
The last 3 tracks on the album are printed in the wrong order on the inlay but are in the correct order here. All songs written and composed by Fightstar, except where noted.

No.	Title	Writer(s)	Producer	Length
1.	"Floods" (Live Lounge performance)		Simon Askew	3:46
2.	"Where's the Money, Lebowski?"		Jason Wilcock	3:26
3.	"Waitin' for a Superman" (Flaming Lips cover)	Wayne Coyne, Michael Ivins, Steven Drozd	Simon Askew	3:29
4.	"Amethyst" (includes the hidden track "Hazy Eyes")		Mark Williams	7:19
5.	"99" (live)		Simon Askew	4:03
6.	"In Between Days" (The Cure cover)	Robert Smith	Christian Wieland	2:38
7.	"Shinji Ikari"		Jason Wilcock	3:59
8.	"Dark Star"		Jason Wilcock	3:43
9.	"Gracious"		Carl Bown	3:43
10.	"Fight for Us"		Matt Hyde	4:08
11.	"Hold Out Your Arms" (live acoustic)		Carl Bown	4:04
12.	"NERV/SEELE"		Jason Wilcock	3:51
13.	"Zihuatanejo"		Jason Wilcock	3:36
14.	"Breaking the Law" (Judas Priest cover)	Rob Halford, K.K. Downing, Glenn Tipton	Carl Bown	2:58
15.	"Minerva" (Deftones cover)	Chino Moreno, Stephen Carpenter, Chi Cheng, Frank Delgado, Abe Cunningham	Matt Hyde	2:51

== Personnel ==
The following people contributed to Alternate Endings:

=== Fightstar ===
- Charlie Simpson — lead vocals, rhythm guitar, keys, lyrics
- Alex Westaway — lead guitar, vocals, lyrics
- Dan Haigh – bass guitar, design
- Omar Abidi – drums, percussion

=== Production ===
- Simon Askew - producer (tracks 1, 3, 5)
- Nick Fountain — engineer (tracks 1, 3, 5)
- Jason Wilcock at Stakeout Studios – producer, mixing (tracks 2, 7, 8, 12, 13)
- Mark Williams – producer, mixing (track 4)
- Christian Wieland – producer, mixing (track 6)
- Carl Bown – producer, mixing (tracks 9, 11, 14)
- Matt Hyde – producer, mixing (tracks 10, 15)
- Matt Colton — mastering
- Daniel Conway — artwork, layout
- Craig Jennings — A&R

== Chart performance ==
Chart (2008)	Peak position
UK Albums (Official Charts)	85
UK Independent Albums (OCC)	5
UK Rock Albums (OCC)	5
