= I Am the Message =

Single by Fightstar

from the album One Day Son, This Will Be All Yours
- B-side: "Waiting For Superman"
- Released: 16 June 2008 (UK)
- Recorded: 2007
- Songwriters: Charlie Simpson, Alex Westaway, Dan Haigh, Omar Abidi
- Producer: Matt Wallace

Fightstar singles chronology
"Floods" (2008)	"I Am the Message" (2008)	"The English Way" (2008)

"I Am the Message" is the fifth and final single by British rock band Fightstar, from their second studio album One Day Son, This Will All Be Yours. The song was released as a 7" vinyl and digital download on 16 June.

== Music video ==
The video for "I Am the Message" is a collection of videos taken by the band. These include montages of live performances and spending time in LA where they recorded the album. There are also various clips from older gigs before the second album was recorded.

== Track listing ==
- 7" vinyl and digital download:
1. "I Am The Message" (Album Version)
2. "Waiting For Superman" (Flaming Lips cover)

== Chart performance ==
Chart (2008)	Peak position
Scottish Singles Sales (Official Charts)	36
UK Indie Chart (Official Charts)	4
UK Rock Chart (Official Charts)	1
