= Waste a Moment =

Waste a Moment may refer to:

- Waste a Moment (Fightstar song)
- Waste a Moment (Kings of Leon song)
