= Yuan Baojing =

Chinese billionaire

Yuan Baojing (simplified Chinese: 袁宝璟; traditional Chinese: 袁寶璟; pinyin: Yuán Bǎojǐng; 16 February 1966 – 17 March 2006) was a Chinese billionaire from Liaoyang, Liaoning province. He was the president of the Beijing-based Jianhao Group. He was convicted of murder and executed in March 2006, after what appeared to be a feud with Sichuan businessman Liu Han (who was executed nine years later along with his brother Liu Wei for gun-running and illegally running a mafia).

== Biography ==
Yuan was raised in a peasant family and made a fortune in Beijing. Upon losing CNY 100 million in futures trading, he believed that his loss resulted from manipulation of the broker by Liu Han, a businessman from Sichuan. He offered a former police officer, Wang Xing, CNY 160,000 to murder Liu. Wang in turn hired a contract killer named Li Haiyang. In February 1997, Li shot at Liu twice in a Sichuan hotel but missed, and was sentenced to life in prison. Wang proceeded to blackmail Yuan, who, with his brother Yuan Baoqi, hired their cousins to murder Wang in 2003. Yuan was found guilty of Wang's murder in January 2005 and was scheduled to die by firing squad on 14 October 2005. However, the day before his execution date, his wife transferred ownership of shares worth CNY 49.5 billion to the government, including shares of an Indonesian oilfield, leading to a stay of Yuan's execution until March 2006. On 17 March 2006, Yuan was executed by lethal injection in an execution van in Liaoyang. His brothers Yuan Baoqi and Yuan Baosen were executed on the same day; his cousin Yuan Baofu received a suspended death sentence.

The case regained attention in 2013 in the wake of the incident of Bo Xilai, when media outlets raised speculation about the proceedings of the case and the possible involvement of the former security official Zhou Yongkang, who, through his son Zhou Bin, served as a political patron for Liu Han. The media also questioned whether Yuan was indeed the culprit, and why his brother and cousin also needed to be put to death, raising the possibility that their punishments were influenced by Liu Han and his connection with Zhou Yongkang. In 2015, Liu Han was executed for other crimes.
