= Larusso (disambiguation) =

Larusso is a French singer.

Larusso or LaRusso may also refer to:

- Rudy LaRusso, basketball player
- Vincent LaRusso, American actor
- Daniel LaRusso, a fictional character who appears in The Karate Kid series

== See also ==
- Laruso, an English rock band
- Larus (disambiguation), includes people with the same name
