= Mercury Summer =

Single by Fightstar

from the album Be Human
- Released: 6 April 2009 (UK)
- Recorded: 2008/2009
- Length: 2:43
- Songwriters: Charlie Simpson, Alex Westaway, Dan Haigh, Omar Abidi
- Producers: Carl Bown, Fightstar

Fightstar singles chronology
"The English Way" (2008)	"Mercury Summer" (2009)	"Never Change" (2009)

"Mercury Summer" is the second single from Fightstar's third studio album, Be Human. It was released on 6 April 2009.

Frontman Charlie Simpson said that the inspiration for this song came from one of his favourite movies, The Shawshank Redemption, and the dream of the lead character, Andy.

The inspiration for this song came from one of our favorite films of all time, The Shawshank Redemption, and the character Andy Dufresne's dreams of reaching his paradise Zihuatanejo. "At the base of it, it's really just a love song but it interprets the story of a couple on a journey to find their own nirvana away from all of the consumerist bulls*** that surrounds us in our day to day lives.

Bassist Dan Haigh has stated that the original song was meant to include a sample of Morgan Freeman's dialogue from the film- the line "I hope the sea is as blue as our dream"- but, in his words, "Hollywood screwed that up for us. We just couldn't get it cleared."

== Track listing ==
CD:

1. "Mercury Summer" (Single Edit)
2. "Athea"

7" Vinyl:

1. "Mercury Summer"
2. "We Left Tracks of Fire"

iTunes EP Bundle :

1. "Mercury Summer" (Single Edit)
2. "Athea"
3. "We Left Tracks of Fire"
4. "Mercury Summer" (Acoustic)
5. "Mercury Summer" (Nero vs. Ohms Remix)
6. "Mercury Summer" (Music Video)

== Music video ==
The video was premiered on their myspace on 25 February 2009. It features the band dressed in suits, in a spinning room, along with images of a blonde woman played by Lucy Misch (now Lucy Challenger).

== Chart performance ==
Mercury Summer entered the UK Charts at No. 46, Fightstar's highest single position since Hazy Eyes which peaked at number 47. It also entered at No. 1 and No. 3 in the Rock Singles Chart and Independent Singles chart respectively.

Chart (2009)	Peak position
Scottish Singles Sales (Official Charts)	7
UK Singles (Official Charts)	46
UK Indie Chart (Official Charts)	3
UK Rock Chart (Official Charts)	1
