= A City on Fire =

Single by Fightstar

from the album Be Human: Deluxe Edition
- Released: 21 December 2009
- Recorded: 2009
- Length: 3:11
- Songwriters: Charlie Simpson, Alex Westaway, Dan Haigh, Omar Abidi
- Producer: Fightstar

Fightstar singles chronology
| "Never Change" (2009) | "A City on Fire" (2009) | "Animal" (2015) |

"A City on Fire" is a song by English post-hardcore band Fightstar, released 20 December 2009, on Search and Destroy Records as a digital download only.

The single is featured on the deluxe edition re-release of the band's third album, Be Human, which includes four recorded tracks.

== Digital bundle ==
1. "A City on Fire" – 3:11
2. "Vincent" (Don McLean cover) – 4:01

== Music video ==
A music video was filmed for the single in October 2009, and premiered on the bands MySpace on 24 October. The video was directed by Sitcom Soldiers.

The video depicts the band performing in a studio in front of a brightly lit display screen. There are also various shots of London sped up, and various political messages on billboards.

== Chart positions ==
| Chart | Peak position |
|---|---|
| Scottish Singles Sales (Official Charts) | 97 |
| UK Singles (Official Charts) | 116 |
| UK Indie Chart (Official Charts) | 10 |
| UK Rock Chart (Official Charts) | 4 |

== Personnel ==
- Charlie Simpson – lead vocals, rhythm guitar
- Alex Westaway – lead guitar, vocals
- Dan Haigh – bass guitar
- Omar Abidi – drums, percussion
