= The English Way =

Single by Fightstar

from the album Be Human
- Released: 3 November 2008 (UK)
- Recorded: 2008
- Length: 3:35
- Songwriters: Charlie Simpson, Alex Westaway, Dan Haigh, Omar Abidi
- Producers: Carl Bown, Fightstar

Fightstar singles chronology
"I Am the Message" (2008)	"The English Way" (2008)	"Mercury Summer" (2009)

"The English Way" was the first single to be taken from Fightstar's third studio album, Be Human. It was released on 3 November 2008.

Frontman, Charlie Simpson, described the song's meaning as wanting England to be more patriotic, as he believes it has lost its pride and traditional values.

The song debuted at No. 62 in the UK Singles Chart and at No. 2 in the UK Independent Label Chart. The music video for the release proved a success, making both the No. 1 spot on the most requested charts on Scuzz and Kerrang! television stations.

== Track listing ==
CD

1. "The English Way"
2. "Colours Bleed" (Album demo)

iTunes bundle

1. "The English Way"
2. "Hide and Seek" (Imogen Heap cover)
3. "The English Way (Acoustic)"
4. "The English Way (Music video)"

7" vinyl

1. "The English Way"
2. "Drown"

== Chart performance ==
Chart (2008)	Peak position
Scottish Singles Sales (Official Charts)	26
UK Singles (Official Charts)	62
UK Indie Chart (Official Charts)	2
UK Rock Chart (Official Charts)	2

== Personnel ==
Fightstar

- Charlie Simpson — lead vocals, rhythm guitar, keyboard
- Alex Westaway — vocals, lead guitar
- Dan Haigh — bass guitar
- Omar Abidi — drums, percussion
- Caius Fitzgerald, Luke Bowen, Andrew Armstrong, Josh Rees-Jones — choir vocals

Additional

- Produced by Carl Bown and Fightstar
- Engineered by Chris Potter
- Mixed by Carl Bown
- Recorded at Treehouse Studios, West Sussex, England.
- Artwork by Ryohei Hase
