= A Classic Case of Cause and Effect =

Studio album by Laruso
- Released: May 2009
- Genre: Alternative rock, Alternative metal
- Label: Autonomy
- Producer: Carl Bown

Laruso chronology
Bring It On (2005)	A Classic Case of Cause and Effect (2009)

A Classic Case of Cause and Effect is the second album by English rock band Laruso, released in May 2009 on Autonomy Recordings. Laruso toured with Fightstar during April and May 2009, to promote the album, generating a lot of new fans throughout the tour. The final track of the album, cause and effect, has a hidden instrumental which plays at 16:26.

== Track list ==
No.	Title	Length
1.	"This Isn't a Moon, It's a Space Station!"	3:30
2.	"1998"	3:52
3.	"Plain Paper Napkins"	3:44
4.	"Control Is a Technicality"	2:06
5.	"Overture"	3:57
6.	"String & Cellotape (Instrumental)"	2:48
7.	"End of Level Boss"	3:26
8.	"The Waking"	3:30
9.	"Never Too Late"	3:28
10.	"Heresy" (feat. Tony Christie)	2:27
11.	"Borderline Exit Plan"	4:19
12.	"Cause & Effect"	19:58
