= Waste a Moment (Fightstar song) =

Single by Fightstar

from the album Grand Unification
- Released: 6 March 2006 (UK)
- Recorded: 2005
- Length: 3:39
- Label: Island
- Songwriters: Charlie Simpson, Alex Westaway, Dan Haigh, Omar Abidi
- Producer: Colin Richardson

Fightstar singles chronology
"Grand Unification Part 1" (2005)	"Waste a Moment" (2006)	"Hazy Eyes" (2006)

"Waste a Moment" is the third single from the Fightstar album Grand Unification.

== Track listing ==
CD Single:

1. "Waste A Moment"
2. "Call To Arms"

7" Vinyl

1. "Waste A Moment"
2. "Minerva (Acoustic)" (Deftones Cover)

DVD

1. "Waste A Moment" (Video)
2. "Ghosts on 31"
3. The Making Of "Grand Unification Pt. 1" (Video)

== Video ==
The video for the song has two versions. The banned version shows the band playing in an abandoned London Underground Tunnel. The rest of the video is about business man who stops a homeless man getting a pound from off the ground. The homeless man throws a marble which a child in a red hoodie follows onto the train tracks. The business man follows him and finds out the child is a demon and the demon holds him while a train runs him down. The narrative of the music video bears a striking similarity to the climax of cult horror film, Don't Look Now. The clean version is exactly the same, but the other scenes are cut out, showing the band throughout the video.

== Chart performance ==
Chart (2006)	Peak position
Scottish Singles Sales (Official Charts)	20
UK Singles (Official Charts)	29
UK Rock Chart (Official Charts)	1
