= Larus (disambiguation) =

Larus is a large genus of gulls with worldwide distribution

Larus or Lárus may also refer to:

- Larus, ancient Cantabrian mercenary
- Lárus Guðmundsson, Icelandic professional footballer
- Lárus Sigurðsson, Icelandic former professional footballer
- James Larus, American computer scientist

== See also ==
- Larusso (disambiguation)
