= Liu Wei (businessman, born 1969) =

Chinese gambling tycoon, executed in February 2015

- 刘维
- Born: 20 April 1969; Guanghan, Sichuan, China
- Died: 9 February 2015 (aged 45); Xianning, Hubei, China
- Cause of death: Execution by lethal injection
- Occupations: Owner, Guanghan Yiyuan Industrial Company
- Known for: Crime boss
- Relatives: Liu Han (brother; executed 2015); Liu Canglong (刘沧龙 cousin)

Liu Wei (Chinese: 刘维; 20 April 1969 – 9 February 2015), also called Liu Yong (刘勇), was a Chinese crime boss. At the height of his power, he was the billionaire owner of the Guanghan Yiyuan Industrial Company (广汉乙源实业公司). He was the younger brother of Liu Han.

In February 2015, Liu Wei and his brother were given the death penalty and executed for murder, running a mafia-style gang, gunrunning, and other charges.

== Early life ==
Liu Wei was born in 1969 in Guanghan, Sichuan province, in a family of five children. His father, Liu Zhangke (刘章科), was a veteran of the Korean War and a physics teacher and died in 1990. His mother, Li Wanzhen (李万珍), was a street vendor.

Liu Wei dropped out of high school and went to ride a tricycle to sell popsicles and snacks.

== Career ==
=== Gambling and shooting ===
In the 1990s, Liu Wei and Liu Han started to operate gambling dens in Guanghan. They traded in the commodity market between 1994 and 1997 and earned hundreds of millions of yuan.

On September 14, 1992, Sichuan and Hunan police went to Guanghan to arrest and detain Liu Han for fraud. Liu Wei then sent Sun Huajun (孙华君), Wu Xiaobing (吴小兵), and others to arrive by car and shoot at the law enforcement officers, which allowed Liu Han to escape. As a result, Liu Wei was arrested. Since then, Liu Wei's notoriety began to spread.

In 1994, Liu Han became a billionaire from trading futures. In September 1994, Liu Wei was released on bail and returned to Guanghan. Liu Han then handed over his gambling hall to Liu Wei. Then, Liu Wei began to recruit people from secret societies to buy guns and ammunition and expand his power.

On August 18, 1998, Liu Wei ordered Min Jie (闵杰), Zhang Wei (张伟), Li Junguo (李君国), and others to shoot and kill Zhou Zheng (周政), thereby eliminating one of his biggest competitors in Guanghan.

In 2000, Liu Wei charged a high protection fee by threatening violence and seized shares without paying a penny. He successively took two large gambling halls opened by Chen Mou (陈某) and Shi Mou (石某) as his own, monopolizing the gambling market in Guanghan. At the same time, by bribing, providing drugs and other means, Liu Wei attracted corrupt police officers and political and legal cadres and provided illegal shelter within his gambling halls for other illegal and criminal activities.

By monopolizing Guanghan's gambling game machine industry and controlling the markets of gravel and building materials in Guanghan and its surrounding areas, Liu Wei seized tens of millions of yuan of ill-gotten wealth.

=== Mafia ===
At the end of 2005, Huang Changqing (黄常庆), who was engaged in sand and gravel management, wanted to bid for sand mining rights in Jinqiao Village (金桥村), Majing Town (马井镇), Shifang City (什邡市). Because he knew that Liu Wei and his organization had great influence in the local area, he asked Liu Wei for help. After Liu Wei agreed, he instructed his brother to ask others to withdraw from the bidding.

On January 6, 2006, on the day of the auction, Huang Changqing won the right to sand mining with a bid price of 2.8 million yuan.

At the end of 2006, Luo Hongyong (罗洪勇) wanted to bid for the right to sand mining in the first reach of Yazi River (鸭子河) in Nanquan Town (南泉镇), Shifang City, and asked Liu Zhongwei (刘忠伟), a criminal of another case "Umbrella", to come forward and ask Liu Wei for help. After Liu Wei's arrangement, interested bidders withdrew from the bidding one after another, and Luo Hongyong won the bid with a placard of 960,000 yuan. Later, Liu Wei held 50% of the shares in the sand field operated by Luo Hongyong and made a profit of more than 4 million yuan.

Later Liu Zhongwei was expelled from the party and sentenced to 13 years in prison.

=== Connection to Zhou Yongkang ===
Liu Wei was connected to Zhou Yongkang, a corrupt politician who was given life imprisonment, via his brother Liu Han. In 1997, Liu Han founded Hanlong Group, and around 2002, he became associated Zhou Yongkang's son Zhou Bin. At the time, Zhou Yongkang was Party Committee Secretary and top leader of Sichuan and provided protection for Liu Wei's gambling ring and illegal mafia activities.

=== 2008 Olympics ===
Liu Wei was a torchbearer for the 2008 Summer Olympics held in Beijing.

== Prosecution and execution ==
In January 2009, Liu Wei and Liu Han staged a shooting at a Guanghan teahouse. Liu Wei ordered his men to attack and kill three other people, including rival gang boss Chen Fuwei. Liu Wei also ordered his men to kill others, including another rival mafia boss in Mianyang, a neighbor in Guanghan, and a villager who protested against one of their real estate projects in Mianyang. During this series of events, Zhu Mou (朱某) was charged with stealing money from guests. Zhu then committed suicide by jumping off the 7th floor of a building. Moreover, one of Liu Wei's associates, Zhong Changhua (钟昌华) was sentenced to 10 years in prison. During the ensuing investigation, one of the suspects named Liu Wei. Liu Wei then went into hiding, and Liu Han helped Liu Wei evade arrest for the triple murder for a while.

=== Arrest and investigation ===
It took four years before Liu Wei was finally arrested. In 2011, officials detained Liu Wei to question him, but Liu Han abused his political connections or guanxi (关系) to help release Liu Wei. In 2012, Xi Jinping became General Secretary of the Chinese Communist Party. Xi then launched an anti-corruption campaign against Bo Xilai, Zhou Yongkang and his associates in Sichuan. This resulted in Bo Xilai and Zhou Yongkang being sentenced to life in prison, as well as their associates Li Chuncheng and Deng Hong being arrested and imprisoned. Months after Xi became top leader, in March 2013, Liu Wei and Liu Han were finally arrested.

Police seized 20 guns, three grenades, and thousands of bullets from Liu Wei's gang. The investigation into Liu Wei and his mafia spanned the city of Beijing and more than 10 provinces in China.

=== Criminal charges ===
Liu Wei and Liu Han were charged with the following crimes:

- running a mafia-style gang: prosecutors in Hubei determined that the Liu brothers and 34 others set up the gang in 1993
- murder: the mafia-gang murdered at least nine people
- affray
- assault
- illegal detention
- illegal purchase and selling of guns
- illegally owning guns
- interfering in state functions: bribing corrupt officials for protection and to expand influence on society
- extortion
- gambling
- fraud

=== Execution ===
Liu Wei, Liu Han, and 34 others were tried at the Xianning Intermediate People's Court in Hubei province. In May 2014, Liu Wei and Liu Han were sentenced to death and found guilty of intentional homicide, running a mafia-like gang, and 13 other charges. They appealed to the High People's Court of Hubei, which upheld the original sentences in August 2014. Liu Han and Liu Wei were executed on 9 February 2015, along with three associates.
