= Floods (Fightstar song) =

Single by Fightstar

from the album One Day Son, This Will Be All Yours
- Released: 3 March 2008
- Recorded: 2007
- Length: 3:34
- Label: Gut; Edsel
- Songwriters: Charlie Simpson, Alex Westaway
- Producer: Matt Wallace

Fightstar singles chronology
"Deathcar" (2007)	"Floods" (2008)	"I Am the Message" (2008)

Audio sample
- "Floods": file; help

"Floods" is the fourth single from Fightstar's second studio album, One Day Son, This Will All Be Yours. It was originally intended to be released as the second single, however this was changed to "We Apologise For Nothing" due to the recent floods in the UK at that time.

Charlie Simpson has stated the song deals more with environmental issues, such as global warming and climate change, and about how people have influenced their own downfall within it. The song was released on their MySpace on 14 January 2008.

In a question and answer session in September 2007, both Charlie and Alex confirmed that the third single from the album would most likely be Floods. Eventually, it was, in fact, "Deathcar" released on 3 December 2007. However, during another Q and A session on the band's official forums on 28 November 2007, Alex confirmed they were working on new tracks to be possibly used as part of an EP for the "Floods" release.

It was confirmed via the band's official website and MySpace, that "Floods" would be released as the latest single on 3 March 2008. It reached No.3 on the UK Rock Chart, and No.2 in the UK Indie Chart, but failed to chart in the UK Singles Chart.

The release included three brand new b-sides, "Flotation Therapy", "Zihuatanejo" and "Dark Star" (released exclusively on the Gut Records digital download bundle).

== Track listing ==
- CD Single:
1. "Floods"
2. "Floatation Therapy"
3. "Floods" (Instrumental)
4. "Floods" (Music Video)
5. "Floods" (Making of The Video)
- 7" Vinyl:
1. "Floods" (Radio Mix)
2. "Zihuatanejo"
- Digital Download:
1. "Floods" (Instrumental)
2. "Floods" (Radio Mix)
- iTunes Exclusive:
1. "Floods" (Acoustic)
2. "Floods"
- Gut Record Exclusive Bundle:
1. "Floods" (Album Version)
2. "Dark Star"

== Video ==
The video depicts the band playing inside the attic of a small house. As the song progresses various CGI shots from the film Flood are shown, which visualises mass flooding across famous landmarks in London. Firstly the 02 (formerly the Millennium Dome), then Tower Bridge, followed by the London Eye and finally Westminster. As the song comes to a climax the sound of rain fall increases as bass player Dan Haigh looks at the window. The camera swings out to show nearly everything submerged under water, including the house the band were playing in, This is exactly the same shot as in the film, but the film depicts a lady screaming for help. The video is available on the band's official site and YouTube. A "Behind The Scenes" clip is also soon to be made available.

== Chart performance ==
Chart (2008)	Peak position
Scottish Singles Sales (Official Charts)	32
UK Singles (Official Charts)	114
UK Indie Chart (Official Charts)	2
UK Rock Chart (Official Charts)	3

== Reviews ==
- STV Singles review: 21 February 2008 link
- Music News review by James Coplin
