= Liu Han =

Chinese mining tycoon, executed in February 2015

- 刘汉
- Born: 25 October 1965; Guanghan, Sichuan, China
- Died: 9 February 2015 (aged 49); Xianning, Hubei, China
- Cause of death: Execution by lethal injection
- Occupations: Chairman, Hanlong Group
- Partner: Yang Xueshan (杨雪善 former wife)
- Relatives: Liu Wei (brother; executed 2015); Liu Canglong (刘沧龙 cousin)

Liu Han (Chinese: 刘汉; pinyin: Liú Hàn; 25 October 1965 – 9 February 2015) was a Chinese billionaire businessman, the former chairman of the conglomerate Hanlong Group, with interests in power generation and mining. His assets were officially valued at 40 billion yuan (US$6.4 billion). He was convicted of murder, running a mafia-style gang, and many other charges, and executed in February 2015.

== Early life ==
Liu Han was born in 1965 in Guanghan, Sichuan province, the middle child in a family with three sons and two daughters. His father, Liu Zhangke (刘章科), was a veteran of the Korean War, who worked as a secondary school physics teacher after leaving the army. He died in 1990. His mother, Li Wanzhen (李万珍), worked as a street vendor.

== Early career and assassination attempt ==
In the mid-1980s, Liu Han began buying and reselling timber, construction material, and petroleum. In the early 1990s, he started to operate gambling dens in Guanghan with his brother Liu Wei. He entered the commodity market in the mid-1990s, trading soy beans and steel between 1994 and 1997, which earned him hundreds of millions of yuan.

Liu's commodity trading resulted in a dispute with the Liaoning billionaire Yuan Baojing. Yuan lost nearly 100 million yuan and believed that it was caused by Liu's manipulation of a broker. He offered a former policeman, Wang Xing, 160,000 yuan for Liu's life. Wang in turn hired the contract killer Li Haiyang. In February 1997, Li shot at Liu twice in a Sichuan hotel but missed him. Li was captured and later sentenced to life in prison. Wang Xing then repeatedly blackmailed Yuan Baojing, who eventually hired his cousins to murder Wang in 2003. Yuan was convicted of murder and executed on 17 March 2006.

== Hanlong Group ==
Liu Han founded Hanlong Group in 1997. In 2000, he moved the conglomerate's headquarters from Mianyang to Chengdu, the capital of Sichuan province. Around 2002, he became associated with Zhou Bin, a son of Zhou Yongkang, then Chinese Communist Party Committee Secretary and top leader of Sichuan. He built two hydroelectric stations in Ngawa in 2001. He sold the stations in 2005 for 500 million yuan to a British Virgin Islands company, which then resold them to a subsidiary of Datang Power for 2.7 billion yuan only two months later.

In 2009, Hanlong Group bought a controlling stake in Moly Mines, a Perth-based Australian mining company. Hanlong also bid $1.3 billion for Sundance Resources, another Australian mining company, but the deal collapsed after Liu Han was arrested in March 2013 on multiple charges.

Liu Han owned more than 70 subsidiary companies with business in energy, mining, real estate, finance, and securities. His assets were officially valued at 40 billion yuan (US$6.4 billion).

== Prosecution and execution ==
Liu Han and his brother Liu Wei attracted the attention of the central government after a January 2009 shooting at a Guanghan teahouse. Liu Wei allegedly ordered the attack, which killed three men including the rival gang boss Chen Fuwei, who had been recently released from prison. The brothers had allegedly ordered the killing of others, including a villager who led a protest against one of their real estate projects in Mianyang, a rival gang boss in Mianyang, and an old neighbour in Guanghan.

Liu Han was arrested in March 2013, only months after Xi Jinping became General Secretary of the Chinese Communist Party, China's paramount leader. Xi launched an anti-corruption campaign which in its early days targeted Zhou Yongkang's associates in Sichuan. The Liu brothers were tried at the Xianning Intermediate People's Court in Hubei province, and sentenced to death in May 2014. Han was also deprived of his political rights for life, and ordered to forfeit all of his assets. Liu Han was found guilty on thirteen charges, including murder, running casinos and a mafia-like gang, and selling firearms. They appealed to the High People's Court of Hubei, which upheld the original sentences in August 2014. Liu Han and Liu Wei were executed on 9 February 2015, along with three associates.

== Philanthropy ==
Until Liu Han's arrest and trial, he was best known as a philanthropist. He gained fame in China in the aftermath of the Great Sichuan earthquake of 2008, in which thousands of children died when several schools built by the state collapsed. In contrast, the school Liu Han built withstood the quake and all of its students survived the disaster unharmed. He also made major donations in the subsequent relief efforts.

== Personal ==
Liu Han had a passion for cars, and boasted that he owned 80 luxury cars. He was an avid gambler who sometimes gambled all night long. During his trial, he said he lost $128 million gambling in Macau, $15 million in the United States, and millions more in Singapore and Australia.
