= Paint Your Target =

2005 single by Fightstar

Single by Fightstar

from the album Grand Unification
- B-side: "Until Then"; "Cross Out the Stars"
- Released: 13 June 2005
- Length: 3:16
- Label: Island
- Songwriters: Charlie Simpson; Alex Westaway
- Producer: Chris Sheldon

Fightstar singles chronology
"Palahniuk's Laughter" (2005)	"Paint Your Target" (2005)	"Grand Unification Part 1" (2005)

"Paint Your Target" is a song by English post-hardcore band Fightstar. It was released on 13 June 2005 as the lead single from their debut studio album, Grand Unification (2006). It charted at number nine in the United Kingdom. To 'paint your target' is a military expression which refers to identifying and marking a target so that it can be attacked by other forces.

There are also two recorded versions of "Paint Your Target". One, recorded by Chris Sheldon, was released as a single and appeared on both of the music videos. The other, recorded by Colin Richardson, appears on Grand Unification.

== Music video ==
There are two videos for this song: the first was banned by Emap TV who objected to scenes of violence in the video. The video, shot by the band's bassist Dan Haigh, features children playing cowboys and indians and pretending to shoot each other. Bullets were added digitally in post-production, making the pretend violence look real. A second video, also shot by Haigh, was released in its place, but the original was later posted online to the band's website and NME.

The second version depicts the band in a room playing the song.

== Track listings ==
UK CD single
No.	Title	Length
1.	"Paint Your Target"	3:16
2.	"Until Then"	4:47
3.	"Cross Out the Stars"	5:02

UK 7-inch single
No.	Title	Length
1.	"Paint Your Target"	3:16
2.	"Until Then"	4:47

UK DVD single
No.	Title	Length
1.	"Paint Your Target" (video—exclusive version)
2.	"Palahniuk's Laughter" (video)
3.	"Paint Your Target" (acoustic version audio)
4.	"The Making of Palahniuk's Laughter" (video)

== Charts ==
Chart (2005)	Peak position
Ireland (IRMA)	29
Scottish Singles Sales (Official Charts)	6
UK Singles (Official Charts)	9
