= Laruso =

English rock band

Laruso were an English rock band formed by Darren Smith in Sheffield in late 2002. They released their debut album, Bring It On, in May 2005 on Casket Music. Their second album, A Classic Case of Cause and Effect, was released in May 2009 on Autonomy Recordings. The album was produced by the band's guitarist Carl Bown and featured a guest appearance by his uncle, pop singer Tony Christie. in April/May 2009 Laruso toured with Fightstar and In Case of Fire to promote the release of A Classic Case of Cause and Effect. They also undertook a tour in August 2009 to support the album and release of the single "Plain Paper Napkins".

On 4 May 2010, Laruso recorded the video for new single 'It's Not Over (Till We're Dead)' inviting fans to attend the shoot and appear in the video. But the single is yet to surface, and nothing has been heard from the band since early 2010.

== Discography ==
- Bring It On (Casket, 2005)
- A Classic Case of Cause and Effect (Autonomy, 2009)

== Members ==
- Carl Bown (guitar)
- Simon Hills (bass)
- Liv Puente (vocals)
- Darren Smith (guitar)
- Max Williams (drums)
- Jason Abel (vocals)
