= Hazy Eyes =

Single by Fightstar

from the album Grand Unification
- Released: 5 June 2006 (UK)
- Recorded: 2005
- Length: 3:15
- Label: Island
- Songwriters: Charlie Simpson, Alex Westaway
- Producer: Colin Richardson

Fightstar singles chronology
| "Waste a Moment" (2006) | "Hazy Eyes" (2006) | "99" (2007) |

"Hazy Eyes" is the fourth single from the debut Fightstar album Grand Unification. Written by Charlie Simpson and Alex Westaway, "Hazy Eyes" was released a year after the first single "Paint Your Target".

== Track listing ==
CD:

1. "Hazy Eyes"
2. "She Drove Me to Daytime Television" (Funeral for a Friend Cover)

CD Maxi:

1. "Hazy Eyes"
2. "Fight For Us"
3. "Palahniuk's Laughter"
4. "Hazy Eyes" (Video)

7" Vinyl:

1. "Hazy Eyes"
2. "Sleep Well Tonight" (Live Acoustic)

== Chart performance ==
| Chart (2006) | Peak position |
|---|---|
| Scottish Singles Sales (Official Charts) | 34 |
| UK Singles (Official Charts) | 47 |
| UK Rock Chart (Official Charts) | 2 |
