= We Apologise for Nothing =

Single by Fightstar

from the album One Day Son, This Will Be All Yours
- Released: 17 September 2007 (UK)
- Recorded: 2007
- Genre: Alternative rock, post-hardcore
- Length: 4:13
- Songwriters: Charlie Simpson, Alex Westaway
- Producer: Matt Wallace

Fightstar singles chronology
"99" (2007)	"We Apologise for Nothing" (2007)	"Deathcar" (2007)

"We Apologise for Nothing" is the second single from the second album One Day Son, This Will All Be Yours, by Fightstar. It was released on 17 September 2007 on CD and two 7"s, and was accompanied by a music video.

Frontman Charlie Simpson has stated the meaning behind the song:

"This song is about standing up for what you believe in without compromise. Whether it be in public protest or behind closed doors the best way to achieve your goals is to stand up and relentlessly fight for them."

He also stated the reason for the choice of covering The Cure's "In Between Days" for the single release:

"The reason for choosing The Cure's "In Between Days" is that they have been a huge influence on me from a very young age and I thought that this would be a great opportunity to pay tribute to them by covering one of my favourite songs of theirs. The Cure are one of the most influential bands of our time and the song I chose to cover – 'In Between Days' - is one of my favourites."

== Track listing ==
CD Single:

1. "We Apologise for Nothing"
2. "Gracious"
3. "99" (Video)
4. "We Apologise for Nothing" (Video)

Limited 7-inch Gatefold:

1. "We Apologise for Nothing"
2. "Hold Out Your Arms (Acoustic)"

Limited 7-inch Coloured Vinyl:

1. "We Apologise for Nothing"
2. "In Between Days" (The Cure Cover)

iTunes Exclusive:

1. "Abuse Me" (Silverchair Cover)
2. "Breaking the Law" (Judas Priest Cover)

== Video ==
The video depicts the band playing in the well known outfit choice of black suits and shirts with red ties. They are shown performing in an empty theatre, although several shots are shown of an audience applauding in technicolor. More than once, we see shots of people who show signs of working in the theatre (e.g. An actress preparing herself in her make-up room), as the video progresses, these people look up at the camera and their eyes turn completely black. As the video comes to an end, these people begin to fade away, as do segments of the audience. The video ends with the curtains closing, and an old picture is shown of the band standing around a certificate acknowledging they played at the theatre. This is a possible reference to the ending of The Shining, where the film ends and the main character is shown in a picture that was taken decades before he was allegedly born.

== Chart performance ==
Chart (2007)	Peak position
Scottish Singles Sales (Official Charts)	24
UK Singles (Official Charts)	63
UK Indie Chart (Official Charts)	1
UK Rock Chart (Official Charts)	3
