= Hanlong Group =

Defunct Chinese conglomerate formerly active in mining and energy

Hanlong Group (汉龙集团) was a Chinese business conglomerate based in Sichuan Province with past holdings in solar energy, communications, chemicals, and mineral exploration. It became internationally known for its investments in Africa and its dramatic collapse following a major corruption scandal.

Hanlong’s publicly listed subsidiary was Sichuan Hongda Co., Ltd. (四川宏达股份有限公司; SSE: 600331), which remains listed on the Shanghai Stock Exchange.

== International Projects ==
In Tanzania, Hongda signed a US$3 billion deal in 2011 for coal and iron mining, marking one of the largest Chinese investments in East Africa at the time. The investment included plans to develop a 600 MW coal-fired power plant at Mchuchuma and Katewaka via a joint venture called Tanzania China International Mineral Resources (TCIMR).

In Cameroon and the Republic of Congo, Hanlong led negotiations with the Cameroonian government on the Mining Convention for the Mbalam-Nabeba Iron Ore Project. The deal involved Hanlong’s attempted takeover of Australia's Sundance Resources to gain control of the transborder project. However, the acquisition fell through in 2013 after Hanlong failed to fulfill financing obligations.

== Downfall and Dissolution ==
In 2014, Hanlong's chairman Liu Han was charged with murder and running a mafia-style criminal enterprise. His organization was said to have operated with the protection of former Chinese Politburo Standing Committee member Zhou Yongkang. Liu Han was sentenced to death and executed in February 2015.

In a separate incident Calvin Zhu, vice president of Hanlong’s Australian subsidiary, was sentenced in 2013 to 15 months in prison for insider trading related to the Sundance deal.

Following these events, Hanlong Group was effectively dissolved, with most of its projects discontinued or transferred.
