= VinylDisc =

Hybrid analog-digital recording format

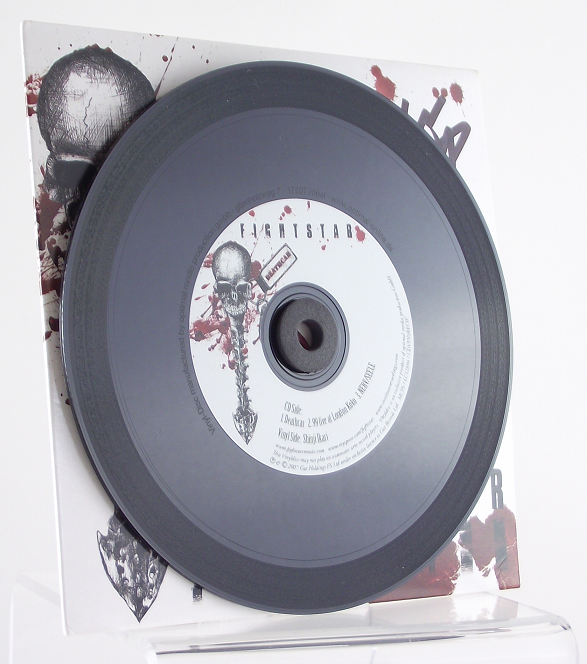
Deathcar on a VinylDisc

The VinylDisc is a combination of a digital layer, either in CD or DVD format, and an analog layer, which is a vinyl record, developed by the German company Optimal Media Production. It consists of a silver layer containing CD or DVD and a black polyvinyl chloride layer (able to hold 3.5 minutes of audio on 33⅓ rpm) which can be played on a regular phonograph.

Examples of singles already released in the hybrid format are Paramore's "Misery Business", The Mars Volta's cover of "Candy and a Currant Bun" by Pink Floyd, and the 2017 album "Hyakki Echo" by Merzbow and Fightstar's "Deathcar" which reportedly had a limited run of 3000 copies. A sample VinylDisc to promote this new format was given to visitors of the 2007 Popkomm, containing music by Jazzanova, where it was presented in September 2007.
