= Grand Unification (Fightstar album) =

Studio album by Fightstar
- Released: 13 March 2006
- Recorded: 2005
- Studios: Townhouse Studios and Miloco Studios, London; The Chapel; Lincolnshire
- Genres: Post-hardcore; alternative rock; alternative metal; emo; hard rock
- Length: 49:36
- Labels: Island; Trustkill
- Producer: Colin Richardson

Fightstar chronology
They Liked You Better When You Were Dead (2005)	Grand Unification (2006)	One Day Son, This Will All Be Yours (2007)

Singles from Grand Unification
- 1. "Paint Your Target" Released: 13 June 2005; 2. "Grand Unification, Pt. I" Released: 31 October 2005; 3. "Waste a Moment" Released: 6 March 2006; 4. "Hazy Eyes" Released: 5 June 2006

Grand Unification is the debut studio album by British rock band Fightstar, released on 13 March 2006 through Island Records. Based upon the Neon Genesis Evangelion franchise, Grand Unification was produced by Colin Richardson and is considered a concept album. The lyrics are themed around social commentary at the end of the world, while the album's title refers to the Human Instrumentality Project.

Preceded by the singles "Paint Your Target" and "Grand Unification Pt. I", the album debuted at number twenty eight on the UK Albums Chart and garnered positive critical reviews. Two further singles were released from the album, "Waste a Moment" and "Hazy Eyes"; the album was released over a year later in North America through Trustkill Records.

== Background and recording ==
"We tend to blend really heavy stuff with much more mellow, atmospheric sounds. We love the whole dynamic of really, really heavy, and then - within the same song - really, really chilled out and quiet."

— Charlie Simpson describing the sound of Grand Unification.

After the release and promotion of debut EP They Liked You Better When You Were Dead (2005), the band were approached by their management with regards to whom they wanted to produce their debut full-length. They requested Colin Richardson, and although initially sceptical about their chances, Richardson agreed to collaborate after demos had been sent to the producer. The band explained, "As a producer, how he makes everything sound, the sound craft of what he does in the genre is so perfect. The production alone blows your fucking mind, never mind the music. We sent him the demos and our EP, and he got back to us in like a week. It's a dream come true for us."

The band entered studios in west London, Lincolnshire, and Surrey with Richardson during October 2005. Richardson, who had previously produced albums for the likes of Funeral for a Friend, Machine Head and Fear Factory, was particularly meticulous during pre-production, taking five days just tuning the drums. However once recording had started, he praised the band for being "very focused" and that there was a "real buzz because nobody knows what to expect." The band themselves referred to the sessions as "tone quests", detailing that they had been experimenting with the different amps they had available, including those borrowed from friends. Bassist Dan Haigh explained, "We're currently on a mission to get the heaviest possible guitar sounds. We've got amps that were featured on records by Carcass, Arch Enemy and SikTh, so there's a wealth of metal history right there for us to tap into."

The band have stated that, when entering recording, they did not want to produce a "typical post-hardcore record". Frontman and co-lyricist Charlie Simpson explained that "[T]here's a post-rock instrumental intro and a piano-led song. It flies through all these different sounds, but it's still in keeping with our style." Simpson also explained that the band enjoy a shift in dynamics, often going from a heavy and aggressive style to soft and quiet passages during the same song. Describing the evolution in sound from their debut EP, the band stated that Grand Unification is a lot "grander", both in terms of songs and production.

Second lyricist and lead guitarist Alex Westaway spoke of the "dark" tone amongst many of the songs; "We really tried to veer away from the whole emo thing. It's too easy to write in that vein and now there are too many bands doing it badly. Our songs became darker. We’re always trying to find the beauty of darkness. There's something fascinating about shaping shadows." The band decided to re-record three tracks that featured on their debut EP, those being "Hazy Eyes", "Lost Like Tears in Rain" and "Mono" (the latter is named in honour of the Japanese band of the same name). Upon completion of recording in December, Simpson stated, "We're so happy with what we're doing. No matter how people perceive it when it comes out, we'll still be very proud and that's the most important thing." Richardson was also "immensely proud" of the completed record, adding, "It's records like these that will go a long way to putting the British scene back on the map. There's not a single weak song on it, and you can't say that about too many records these days. It's an album that will stand the test of time."

== Concept and lyrics ==
Grand Unification is a concept album, which is influenced and based upon the anime series Neon Genesis Evangelion. The lyrics are loosely based on the personal experiences of lyricists Charlie Simpson and Alex Westaway, but the basic concept revolves around two people who experience the last few days of life before the end of the world. Westaway has explained that "[R]elationships and things we've actually experienced are involved, but the basic concept is about two people who experience the last few days of life as they know it before the world's ended. Neon Genesis and stuff. It's from a manga series called Evangelion, which is about angels that come down from heaven to wipe out human kind. It's related to that same kind of feeling, that only chosen people survive, and the world becomes a better place afterwards."

The album starts with sleeping and ends with waking up, portraying the subsequent events in between taking place in a dream state. The band have stated that because of this, they had more agency on a lyrical front, while the ethic of the subjects related to the modern day. The single "Waste a Moment" was written about the 2005 London bombings, which in the context of the album is told from a personal perspective, yet in a surreal setting. The band have admitted though that the concept was not initially intended. Despite the fact that the track "Lost Like Tears in Rain" was lyrically based around the Evangelion story, the band only realised connections throughout the songs towards the end of recording. The track "Lost Like Tears in Rain" contains the line "It's Neon Genesis" to support the band's interest in the anime series. Simpson explained that "[I]t starts with 'To Sleep' and ends with 'Wake Up', so it went in this big cycle. We never intended that to happen until we looked at the album and thought 'Oh, shit, it works like that'. That's the only way I would have done it. I wouldn't want to sit down and think, 'Let's write a concept record'. I was only happy because it naturally evolved."

== Artwork ==
The album artwork, drawn digitally by Daniel Conway, portrays scenes similar to that of the ruined cities in Evangelion. It is also thought to believe the cover has taken influence from the song "Grand Unification Part 2" as the lyric "hold my hand until the waves come" and the cover features two persons holding hands waiting for what appears to be a flood.

== Song meanings ==
All of the album's artwork was based upon the concept, with Haigh stating, "What we're doing is centered around hope and starting again, capturing things that are epic. All the videos, album and single artwork are going to be tied into this." Haigh revealed that he had come across Daniel Conway's artwork after "trawling the internet looking for an artist". Haigh was immediately drawn to Conway because of the cohesion between his work and the album's lyrical and conceptual themes; "We’ve always been a visual band and I think people are going to realise that when they see the artwork. Dan Conway is the guy doing the artwork and he’s monumentally talented. His pictures already described our songs perfectly; it was as though he’d already been drawing them for us".

== Reception ==
Professional ratings
Review scores
Source	Rating
AllMusic	3.5/5 stars
BBC Music	(favourable)
Kerrang!	4/5 stars
LAS Magazine	6/10
MusicOMH	4/5 stars
NME	(8/10)
Rock Sound	(9/10)
The Fly	5/5 stars

Grand Unification was released on 13 March 2006 through Island. The band toured the UK in the same month. It was released in the US on 17 April 2007. After facing much scrutiny from the British music press during the band's emergence, Grand Unification was warmly received by the rock and alternative music circles.

Journalist Chris Long of BBC Music wrote a favourable review and opined that "[M]ake no mistake, Fightstar are Charlie Simpson's proper grown-up band, a full-on rock machine. Bursting with energy and thrilling on several tunes, not least the dual powers of the split title track and the throbbing 'Paint Your Target', Grand Unification is a belting collection". Sharon Mawar of AllMusic was also complimentary in her review, awarding the album 3½ stars out of five; "[T]he album opens with a dreamy acoustic instrumental, 'To Sleep', and then the feedback of Alex Westaway's guitar crashed in and the first part of 'Grand Unification' arrived. The second part, later in the album, had a spoken interlude and a softly sung melody over a chilled-out song, at least its first two minutes. Between the two parts was a hard rock album with heavy hitting guitar chords and screamed vocals. It's not quite as angry as Slipknot, but not too far behind, either, although 'Build an Army' certainly sounds like a call to arms. If this was what Charlie Simpson had inside him, no wonder he wanted out of Busted".

Rae Alexandra of Kerrang! magazine awarded the album an "excellent" four K! score. He wrote: "Make no mistake that Simpson and co are very serious about this. 'Build an Army' lurches and rolls on enormous, sweeping riffs that the Deftones would be proud of. 'Here Again (Last Conversation)' spins, splits and stabs, and wouldn't sound out of place on a Glassjaw album. The gargantuan sprawl of six-minute epic 'Mono' showcases an awesome display of tunesmithery as it breathes and shifts from crescendo to crescendo. It really is difficult to find fault the Fightstar's music on any level. Unless, of course, your hell-bent on hating them for their frontman's former job". The magazine's editor, Paul Brannigan, would later commend the album as "one of the best British rock albums of the past decade". Andrew Kelham of Rock Sound magazine gave a score of 9/10 and described the album as "a shockingly impressive debut that makes the naysayers look utterly foolish". He praised the band for maintaining a "fresh ground", despite wearing their influences on their sleeves. "After a delicate, Mogwai-tinged start, the album thrusts to life, unveiling anthem after anthem – 'Waste a Moment' and 'Build an Army' are fiendish and addictive, while 'Sleep Well Tonight' is an immediate classic. Soon you realise that there isn't going to be a dip in quality, and that's that: the past is rendered irrelevant and stupid, and Charlie's a bloody hero."

MusicOMH writer Vik Bansal also gave a favourable review, awarding the album four stars. Although he was disappointed with the exclusion of debut single "Palahniuk's Laughter", he praised the band for showcasing varied dynamics: "Where others are happy to be one-dimensional, Fightstar are not content unless a song moves fluidly through seemingly incongruous but ultimately coherent moods and musical dynamics. The interspersion of thoroughly heavy metal sections within the otherwise widescreen rock of 'Grand Unification Pt. I' and 'Sleep Well Tonight' encapsulates this perfectly". He later added, "And so endeth the lesson. Pop can turn to rock. Dark can be made light. Bad can become good. Time to go out and spread the good news." NME magazine also offered high praise and rated the album at 8/10, commenting "rather brilliant", while Scottish publication The Fly gave a maximum five star rating and praised the album as "one of the 21st century's ultimate rock debuts".

== Track listing ==
All lyrics are written by Charlie Simpson and Alex Westaway; all music is composed by Fightstar

No.	Title	Length
1.	"To Sleep"	1:36
2.	"Grand Unification Pt I"	3:17
3.	"Waste a Moment"	3:37
4.	"Sleep Well Tonight"	4:13
5.	"Paint Your Target"	3:16
6.	"Build an Army"	4:13
7.	"Here Again (Last Conversation)"	3:14
8.	"Lost Like Tears in Rain"	4:01
9.	"Open Your Eyes"	4:00
10.	"Mono"	6:24
11.	"Hazy Eyes"	3:15
12.	"Grand Unification Pt II" (featuring narration by Larry Smarr)	3:56
13.	"Wake Up"	4:36
Total length:		49:36

Japanese bonus tracks
No.	Title	Length
14.	"Call to Arms"	3:59
15.	"Ghost on 31"	3:51
16.	"Paint Your Target" (acoustic)	3:13
17.	"Grand Unification Pt I" (music video; enhanced content)	3:19

American release bonus track
No.	Title	Length
14.	"Fight for Us"	4:38

== Personnel ==
Adapted from the Grand Unification credits.
Fightstar

- Charlie Simpson – lead vocals, rhythm guitar, keys, lyrics
- Alex Westaway – lead guitar, vocals, lyrics
- Dan Haigh – bass guitar, design
- Omar Abidi – drums, percussion

Additional musicians

- Lucy Wilkins – violin
- Sally Herbert – violin
- Oli Langford – viola
- Ian Burdge – cello

Production

- Colin Richardson – producer, mixing
- Matt Hyde – engineering
- Daniel Conway – artwork
- John McMurtrie – photography
- Craig Jennings – A&R

== Charts ==
Chart (2006)	Peak position
Irish Albums (IRMA)	42
Japanese Albums (Oricon)	236
Scottish Albums (OCC)	19
UK Albums (OCC)	28

== Release history ==
Region	Date	Label	Format	Catalogue #	Ref.
Japan	10 March 2006	Universal	Digipack, Enhanced CD	UICI-1046	
United Kingdom	13 March 2006	Island/Sandwich Leg	Compact Disc, digital	CID8165	
United States	17 April 2007	Trustkill	Compact Disc, digital	TK0090	
