= Execution van =

Chinese government vehicle used for executions

An execution van is a vehicle in which prisoners are executed through lethal injection. The vehicle is equipped with an execution chamber with a bed that physically restrains prisoners while lethal injections are administered. Execution vans have been used in the People's Republic of China since 2003.

== People's Republic of China ==
In China, lethal injections were legalized in 1997. Lethal injections are now the most prominent form of capital punishment in China and, in some provinces, are the only legal form of capital punishment.

Yunnan officials authorized the use of execution vans in March 2003 and the province deployed 18 vans in the same year. Zhao Shijie, president of the Yunnan Provincial High Court, said, "The use of lethal injection shows that China's death penalty system is becoming more civilized and humane". Amnesty International expressed concern that the use of execution vans could increase the use of executions. The Supreme People's Court encouraged provinces to adopt execution vans in December 2003.

Makers of execution vans claim that, while expensive to purchase, they are cheaper for poor localities than building execution facilities in jails and courthouses. In 2006, former Chinese judge and current lawyer Qiu Xingsheng argues that "some places can't afford the cost of sending a person to Beijing—perhaps $250—plus $125 more for the drug." Because Beijing is the only place where the drug is manufactured, the vans have allowed localities to administer the death sentence where the crime took place. As of June 2006, 40 execution vans have been manufactured by three companies, including Jinguan, in Jiangsu and Shandong. Naveco has also manufactured execution vans, according to Amnesty International.

Executions are recorded, so law enforcement can ensure they are carried out legally.

== Notable executions ==
On December 22, 2003, organized crime leader, Liu Yong, was executed in an execution van.

On March 17, 2006, billionaire Yuan Baojing was executed in a van for the arranged murder of a blackmailer.

== See also ==
- Gas van
- Police bus
- Prison bus
