= One Day Son, This Will All Be Yours =

One Day, Son, This Will All Be Yours

Studio album by Fightstar
- Released: 24 September 2007
- Recorded: April–May 2007
- Studios: The Pass and Studio Delux; Los Angeles, California
- Genres: Post-hardcore; alternative rock; alternative metal; progressive metal
- Length: 46:12 (Original); 105:20 (Deluxe)
- Labels: Gut; Edsel
- Producer: Matt Wallace

Fightstar chronology
Grand Unification (2006)	One Day, Son, This Will All Be Yours (2007)	Alternate Endings (2008)

Singles from One Day Son, This Will All Be Yours
- 1. "99" Released: 11 May 2007; 2. "We Apologise for Nothing" Released: 17 September 2007; 3. "Deathcar" Released: 3 December 2007; 4. "Floods" Released: 3 March 2008; 5. "I Am the Message" Released: 16 June 2008

One Day Son, This Will All Be Yours is the second studio album by British rock band Fightstar, released on 24 September 2007 through Institute Recordings, itself a subsidiary of independent label Gut Records. Recorded in Los Angeles and produced by Matt Wallace, the album debuted at number twenty seven on the UK Albums Chart and was preceded by the free downloadable single, "99" and first official single, "We Apologise for Nothing". As with the bands debut album, Daniel Conway digitally painted the albums artwork.

The tracks "Unfamiliar Ceilings" and "H.I.P. (Enough)" are both representations of Fightstar's continued interest in the Neon Genesis Evangelion franchise. The former song title comes from a line that the protagonist, Shinji Ikari, speaks during the series. The latter is an acronym for "Human Instrumentality Project", the goal of the fictional secret society "Seele". The third single, "Deathcar", also contains two b-sides; namely "Nerv/Seele" (named after the 2 factions from the Evangelion series) and the track "Shinji Ikari", after the aforementioned character of the same name. Bass Player Dan Haigh is primarily responsible for bringing the influence of Evangelion to Fightstar.

It was announced in June 2009 that the album was being re-released as a deluxe edition, containing a bonus CD including b-sides from the original recording sessions and live versions of "99" and "Deathcar". The new edition was released on 6 July 2009 in the United Kingdom and 11 August for the United States release via Edsel Records, who specialise in repackaged albums.

The album, re-issued in vinyl format, appeared on Amazon as a pre-order in late September.

== Background, writing and recording ==
The album was written and demoed in Northampton at Alex Westaway's barn and then recorded in Los Angeles with producer Matt Wallace (Faith No More, Satchel, Deftones) in Spring 2007. Recording took place in the studios next to Metallica, who at the time were in the early stages of production on their ninth album Death Magnetic.

Lyrically, the album is more of a "personal record" according to frontman Charlie Simpson, as opposed to Grand Unification, which was written as more of a social commentary with a concept based on the Japanese anime series Neon Genesis Evangelion.

He stated that the end of his seven-year relationship whilst writing the album was the reason for this and songs "Deathcar" and "Unfamiliar Ceilings" were directly about the breakup. The track "Floods" was in reference to global warming and "One Day Son" was written about war and the consequences it may have on future generations. "99" was given its name because when Simpson was trying to rename the demo of the track he dropped his laptop down the stairs and the only key that worked was the 9.

Speaking about the general meaning behind the album title, Simpson stated:

"One Day Son This Will All Be Yours" was taken from a picture I saw. It's kind of... the state of things in Iraq at the moment, and it was just basically saying that with everything going on at the moment, whether it be global warming or the wars, or anything in peoples' personal lives – the actions we take now. The repercussions of it, a lot of the things that us a human race are doing at the moment – we're going to see the consequences in fifty years when we're all pretty much old and ready to pop our clogs. It is our kids and our kids' generations that'll deal with it.

== Release and promotion ==
"99" was the first new material promoted from the album. Kerrang! Radio premiered the song on 4 April 2007 announcing it would be download-only and would be available online. The band put a temporary microsite online as of 11 May where fans could sign up and download the single and accompanying video for free. In May and June, the band went on a US tour alongside Emanuel, Madina Lake and Firescape. For the remainder of June, the band toured with Alexisonfire, Funeral for a Friend and Emanuel.

"Floods" was intended to be the first official single, but was later changed to "We Apologise For Nothing" in light of the recent flooding in Britain. On 23 November, a music video was released for "Deathcar". "Deathcar" was the band's next single, which was the first record on the VinylDisc format to be released in the UK. The band supported Coheed and Cambria on the Kerrang! Tour in the UK in January and February 2008. "Floods" was finally released as the third official single on 3 March 2008. The band released a music video for "I Am the Message" on their website on 7 June. "I Am the Message" was released as the fifth and final single on 16 June, before the band begin working on new material.

== Reception ==
Professional ratings
Review scores
Source	Rating
AbsolutePunk	83%
BBC Music	(favourable)
City Life	(favourable)
In the News	7/10
Kerrang!	4/5 stars
Q	4/5 stars
Rock Sound	8/10

The album received strong reviews upon its release, further increasing the band's respect and popularity within the UK's alternative rock/metal scene. The release saw the band expand their sound and push further into both lighter and heavier territories, with a mixture of more melodic soundscapes and heavier metallic styles.

HMV described the album as "a harder effort than previous album Grand Unification, this album is a thrilling mixture of alt. rock and post-hardcore". Joe DeAndrea of AbsolutePunk.net scored the album at 83%, and praised the diversity of songs on offer:

If you like the direction One Day Son takes with "Deathcar", you'll surely enjoy "H.I.P. (Enough)" and "Tannhauser", the tracks that are no doubt the hardest the band's ever written. One Day Son closes with the relaxing "Unfamiliar Ceilings", featuring soft female vocals and a kick drum while lacking the big guitar riffs that are present in almost all of the songs in this album.

Robert Jackman of the BBC was generally favourable, although he did state the album was "tugged in too many directions". He went on to add, "Radio-friendly single '99' is weighty yet melodic, 'You and I' is a ripening attempt at a breathy serenade, while harder tracks like 'Tannhauser' throb with well-regimented aggression, threatening to pulverise anyone who might question the band's rock credentials". In the News awarded the album 7/10. Lewis Bazley was favourable, although he stated the second half of the album didn't hold up as strong as the first:

The first half of the album is superb post-hardcore, with Wallace's production helping the growing vocal confidence of Simpson and Westaway and Abidi's percussion providing weighty accompaniment to the vicious riffs. Though Deathcar's an outstanding headbanger, it's also a snapshot of the album's failing. The tendency to slip into the genre convention of sludgy opening riff followed by tuneful verses and soaring refrains would be more acceptable if said riffs were anything to write home about, but they're too often so uninspired and anachronistic that you dread their post-chorus return. It's a pity, because the opening seven tracks and the intriguing climax show the band's immense talent. Good, but not quite great – yet.

British publication Kerrang! gave the album KKKK's (4/5) and summarized: "this is an album with a gigantic heart, a work that places them among the best Britain has to offer. It could well make them unstoppable". Q Magazine also rated the album 4/5, stating: "the intricate instrumental passages, multi-tracked vocal harmonies and pounding riffs hint at Muse-scale ambition and intellect".

== Track listing ==
All lyrics are written by Charlie Simpson and Alex Westaway; all music is composed by Fightstar, except where noted

No.	Title	Length
1.	"99"	4:05
2.	"We Apologise for Nothing"	4:13
3.	"Floods"	3:34
4.	"One Day Son"	4:13
5.	"Deathcar"	3:58
6.	"I Am the Message"	2:59
7.	"You & I" (featuring Rachel Haden)	4:16
8.	"Amaze Us"	4:30
9.	"H.I.P. (Enough)"	3:00
10.	"Tannhäuser Gate"	3:20
11.	"Our Last Common Ancestor"	3:56
12.	"Unfamiliar Ceilings" (featuring Rachel Haden)	4:07
Total length:		46:12

Deluxe edition bonus disc
No.	Title	Writer(s)	Length
1.	"Gracious" (featuring Rachel Haden)		3:43
2.	"Hold Out Your Arms" (live acoustic)		4:13
3.	"In Between Days" (The Cure cover)	Robert Smith	3:34
4.	"Abuse Me" (Silverchair cover)	Daniel Johns	2:51
5.	"Breaking the Law" (Judas Priest cover)	Rob Halford, K.K. Downing, Glenn Tipton	2:59
6.	"NERV/SEELE"		3:52
7.	"Shinji Ikari"		3:59
8.	"Deathcar" (live)		5:25
9.	"99" (live)		4:19
10.	"Flotation Therapy"		3:29
11.	"Zihuatanejo"		3:32
12.	"Floods" (instrumental)		3:33
13.	"Dark Star"		3:43
14.	"Where's the Money, Lebowski?"		3:26

== Personnel ==
The following personnel contributed to One Day Son, This Will All Be Yours:

Fightstar

- Charlie Simpson – lead vocals, rhythm guitar, keys, lyrics
- Alex Westaway – lead guitar, vocals, lyrics
- Dan Haigh – bass guitar, design
- Omar Abidi – drums, percussion

Additional musicians

- Rachel Haden – backing vocals
- Matt Bowen – violin, string arrangement
- Maria Renee Scherer – cello

Production

- Matt Wallace – producer
- Carl Bown – mixing
- Paul Fig – engineering
- Matt Bowen – assistant engineer
- Daniel Conway – artwork
- Jo Lane – design
- Chris Jennings – A&R

== Chart performance ==
Chart (2007)	Peak position
Scottish Albums (OCC)	30
UK Albums (OCC)	27
UK Independent Albums (OCC)	3

== Release history ==
Region	Date	Label	Format	Catalogue #	Ref.
United Kingdom	24 September 2007	Gut	Compact Disc + DVD, digital download	SADCDA002	
United Kingdom	6 July 2009	Edsel	Compact Disc, digital download	EDSD2063	
United Kingdom	18 October 2019	Edsel	Vinyl, digital download	B07WSPJWV1	
United States	11 August 2009	Edsel	Compact Disc, digital download	EDSD2063	
