= Fightstar =

British rock band

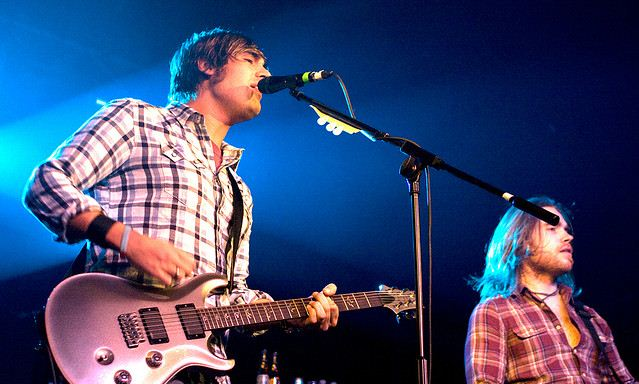
- Frontman Charlie Simpson (left) and bassist Dan Haigh in 2010

Background information
- Origin: London, England
- Genres: Post-hardcore; alternative rock; emo; alternative metal
- Works: Fightstar discography
- Years active: 2003–2010; 2014–2015; 2024
- Labels: PIAS; Gut; Island; Trustkill; Deep Elm
- Spinoffs: Gunship
- Spinoff of: Busted
- Past members: Charlie Simpson; Alex Westaway; Dan Haigh; Omar Abidi
- Website: fightstarmusic.com

Fightstar are an English rock band from London that formed in 2003. The band consists of lead vocalist, guitarist and keyboardist Charlie Simpson, guitarist and co-vocalist Alex Westaway, bassist Dan Haigh and drummer Omar Abidi. Generally considered a post-hardcore band, Fightstar are known to incorporate metal, alternative rock and other genres into their sound. Their debut EP, They Liked You Better When You Were Dead, was released in 2005 and was a critical success.

The band released their debut studio album, Grand Unification, the following year; Kerrang! editor Paul Brannigan called it "one of the best British rock albums of the last decade". Fightstar received a nomination for Best British Band at the 2006 Kerrang! Awards before releasing their second album, One Day Son, This Will All Be Yours, in 2007. A compilation album including B-sides and rarities, Alternate Endings, was released the following year. The band self-funded and co-produced their third album, Be Human (2009), which featured orchestral and choral elements.

Fightstar went on hiatus in 2010, allowing its members to concentrate on other projects. Fightstar reunited in 2014 and released their fourth studio album, Behind the Devil's Back, the following year. It was their highest-charting album, peaking at number 19 on the UK Albums Chart. The record added electronic elements to their eclectic sound. All of their four studio albums charted in the top 40 and received critical praise. In November 2015, Fightstar once again went on hiatus.

On 6 November 2023, Fightstar announced they would be returning for a one-off headline show at OVO Arena Wembley in March 2024 to mark the band's twenty year anniversary.

== History ==
=== Origins (2003–2004) ===
In 2003, when Charlie Simpson was still a member of the pop punk band Busted, he met fellow songwriter-guitarist Alex Westaway and drummer Omar Abidi at a party. During the party, an impromptu jam session took place. Simpson, Westaway and Abidi played a loop of Rage Against the Machine's "Killing in the Name", and agreed to attend a gig a few days later. After the show, they returned to Simpson's flat and played guitars and a v-drum kit; they then wrote their first song, "Too Much Punch". Westaway later invited his school friend Haigh to practise with the band, and they began booking rehearsal sessions. Abidi was studying sound engineering at college, and guitarist Alex Westaway had recently moved to London after dropping out of university. Future bassist Dan Haigh, also based in London, worked for a game development company.

Simpson was becoming increasingly frustrated with Busted's music because he could not explore his own creative desires. The music he wrote did not fit Busted's established pop style. Simpson's time with Fightstar reportedly caused tension in Busted, which was amplified when Fightstar announced a 14-date UK tour. Simpson told Busted's manager in December 2004 over the phone that he was leaving the pop trio to focus on Fightstar, and wanted to do something his "heart was in". At a press conference at the Soho Hotel in London on 14 January 2005, Busted's record label announced that the band had split up after Simpson's departure several weeks earlier.

=== They Liked You Better When You Were Dead (2004–2005) ===
After Simpson's decision to focus on Fightstar, the band entered Criterion Studios in London with producer Mark Williams to begin work on their first EP, They Liked You Better When You Were Dead. It was released as a mini-album, containing nine tracks written during the six months Simpson and Westaway lived together. Recording sessions were often interrupted, since Simpson was in the midst of a sold-out series of Wembley shows with Busted.

They Liked You Better When You Were Dead, released on 28 February 2005 after a brief UK promotional tour. It was a critical success, though Punknews.org reviewed it negatively. Alex Westaway, the band's lead guitarist and co-lyricist, drew its artwork (based on Edward Norton) for the booklet; the EP's lead single, "Palahniuk's Laughter", was inspired by David Fincher's film Fight Club (1999), which in turn was based on the novel of the same name by Chuck Palahniuk. "Palahniuk's Laughter" received heavy rotation on music-video channels and spent many weeks on charts based on video and radio requests. The track, originally entitled "Out Swimming in the Flood", was renamed after the 2004 Indian Ocean tsunami. The EP's UK version contained five tracks (including a sixth hidden track), and was ineligible for the UK Singles Chart. It was released the following year in North America as an extended mini-album by Deep Elm Records. The release was praised by critics, despite initial scepticism due to Simpson's former pop career with Busted.

=== Grand Unification (2005–2006) ===
After the release and promotion of They Liked You Better When You Were Dead, the band were approached by their management about whom they wanted to produce their debut full-length album. They requested Colin Richardson; initially sceptical about their chances, Richardson agreed to collaborate after he listened to their demos. Fightstar entered studios in west London and Surrey with Richardson in October 2005. Richardson, who had previously produced albums for Funeral for a Friend, Machine Head and Fear Factory, was meticulous during pre-production and took five days to tune the drums. When recording began, he called the band "very focused" and said that there was a "real buzz because nobody knows what to expect." Grand Unification is a loose concept album, influenced by and based on the Neon Genesis Evangelion anime series. With lyrics loosely based on the personal experiences of Charlie Simpson and Alex Westaway, its underlying concept revolves around two people who experience the last few days of their lives before the end of the world.

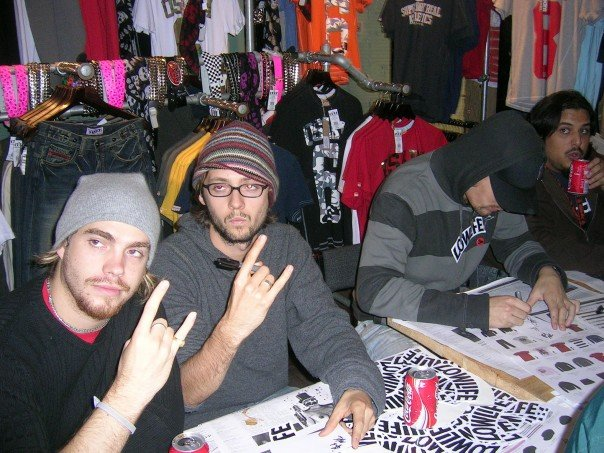
The band at an in-store autograph session

Grand Unification was released in the UK on 13 March 2006 by Island Records, preceded by the single releases of "Paint Your Target", "Grand Unification Pt. I" and "Waste a Moment". The album debuted at number 28 on the UK Albums Chart, and its first single ("Paint Your Target") reached number nine on the Singles Chart. That month, Fightstar were listed by the US rock magazine Alternative Press as one of 100 bands to watch in 2006 and Kerrang! editor Paul Brannigan called the album "one of the best British rock albums of the last decade". The band played at the Download Festival at Donington Park, and followed Biffy Clyro and Funeral for a Friend at the Full Ponty festival in Wales. Fightstar toured several countries, including Australia, Japan and the UK, with Funeral for a Friend for three months in 2006. The band released Grand Unification in North America on 17 April 2007 on Trustkill Records. This version was different from the British and Japanese versions because it features "Fight For Us" (the B-side of the fourth single "Hazy Eyes") as a bonus track.

=== One Day Son, This Will All Be Yours (2007–2008) ===
After leaving Island Records due to a disagreement over the band's artistic direction, Fightstar signed with the independent label Institute Records (a division of Gut Records) for their second album. According to Charlie Simpson, the band and Island had come to a "cross road" when the label began pushing Fightstar to create a more "mainstream" record. The band recorded One Day Son, This Will All Be Yours in Los Angeles with Matt Wallace, who had produced Angel Dust (1992) by Faith No More (one of Simpson's favorite groups).

To promote the album, Fightstar initially released the free downloadable single "99" in May 2007. The track, about being haunted by the loss of a loved one, was made available on the band's microsite with a music video. Its first official single, "We Apologise for Nothing", was released in September and reached number 63 on the UK Singles Chart. The third single, "Deathcar", was the first official UK VinylDisc release. The song, inspired by a harrowing documentary about Chinese execution vans and the end of Simpson's romantic relationship, produced a low-fi music video which cost £500 to make. The VinylDisc single reached number 92 on the UK Singles Chart, peaking at number two on the Indie and Rock Charts in its first week. The fourth single, "Floods", was released the following March. The band wrote it amid growing concern about global warming after they saw Al Gore's documentary, An Inconvenient Truth. Fightstar performed the song on Colin Murray's BBC Radio 1 live sessions. The band went on a 10-date UK tour in May 2008, supported by the London four-piece Brigade. The tour included dates at the Leeds Slam Dunk Festival on 25 May and Carling Academy Islington on 29 May. One Day Son, This Will All Be Yours' last single, "I Am The Message", was released on 16 June 2008 as a double A side single; the other side was a cover of The Flaming Lips' "Waitin' for a Superman", recorded for the Colin Murray Radio 1 show.

=== Alternate Endings and Be Human (2008–2010) ===
On 11 August 2008 Fightstar released the B-sides album Alternate Endings, with live radio sessions, covers and a previously unreleased track. When Gut Records went into administration at the end of 2008 the band decided to release their next album, Be Human, in a joint venture with their management company (Raw Power) on the Search and Destroy label. The album was distributed by PIAS Records. Fightstar released their first single from Be Human, "The English Way", on 3 November 2008 and it topped the UK rock chart. Its video was played on Kerrang! and Scuzz T.V., and topped the MTV2 top 10. The album was co-produced by the band and Carl Bown at Treehouse Studios, Bown's Chesterfield studio. In interviews before its release, Fightstar called the new album "quite different" from their previous releases; Charlie Simpson said that they wanted to experiment with a "rock opera" sound, including strings and a choir. Simpson said that although it might be different, it would still be a Fightstar album with their trademark dark, heavy elements. The band supported Feeder for the first part of their UK tour, which began on 21 October 2008. Drummer Jason Bowld of the British metal band Pitchshifter filled in for Omar Abidi on their UK tour while Abidi recovered from a broken wrist; Abidi returned to touring with the band in early 2009. Due to the drummer's injury, Simpson played drums on six tracks of the new album while Abidi wrote the drum parts and oversaw Simpson's playing.

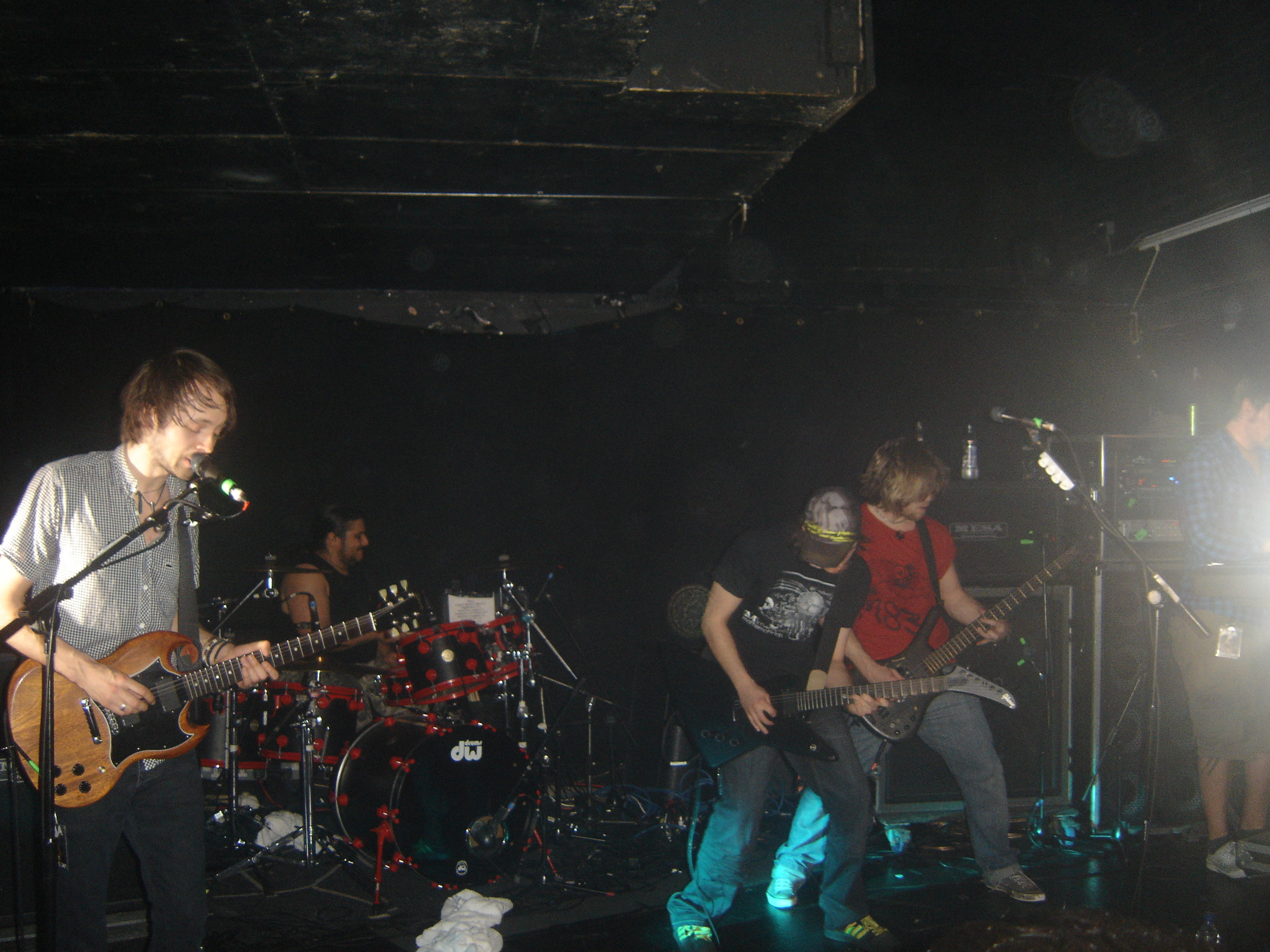
Fightstar performing in 2009

On 4 February 2009, Fightstar announced a 12-date UK tour supported by In Case of Fire and Laruso. Two weeks before the release of Be Human, "Mercury Summer" was released as the next single; its video debuted on the band's MySpace page on 25 February. "Mercury Summer" was well-received, reaching the A List of the Radio 1 Playlist; the band was featured on the BBC2 music show, Sound. "Mercury Summer" was added to the daytime playlist at XFM Radio and picked as Ian Camfield's Record of the Week. Emma Scott and Kerrang Radio also made "Mercury Summer" her Record of the Week. Be Human was released on 20 April 2009, reaching the highest chart peak of any Fightstar album: number 20 on the UK Albums Chart.

The band introduced "A City on Fire" during Fearne Cotton's Radio 1 show on 19 October; its video, directed by Sitcom Soldiers, premiered on 24 October. The single was released as a digital download on 20 December and peaked at numbers four and ten on the UK Rock and Indie charts, respectively. Fightstar released a deluxe edition of Be Human on 1 March 2010 with five new tracks, including "A City on Fire" and a live cover of Jordin Sparks' "Battlefield" on the iTunes edition.

=== Hiatus and side projects (2010–2014) ===
In 2010, Fightstar announced that they were going on hiatus to focus on separate projects. Westaway and Haigh worked on Gunship, a synthwave group devoted to film music, and completed production of the score to Grzegorz Jonkajtys and Bastiaan Koch's short film, The 3rd Letter, with Audrey Riley. The film received several awards from film festivals worldwide. Simpson began work on solo material. In December 2010 he released an EP entitled When We Were Lions through PledgeMusic, an organisation which helps artists raise money to record music from fans. His debut album, Young Pilgrim, was released in August 2011. Simpson's solo work differed from his previous efforts, featuring a sound described as closer to folk music than to rock or pop.

He said that Fightstar would record another album, but he first planned to record another solo album while Westaway and Haigh worked with Gunship. In a December 2012 Digital Spy interview, Simpson confirmed his plan to finish writing (and record) the second solo album in February 2013. After an intended US release and tour in the summer of 2013 promoting the album, he planned that Fightstar would reunite and begin writing for their fourth album. Simpson's second solo album, Long Road Home, was released in August 2014.

=== Return from hiatus and Behind the Devil's Back (2014–2024) ===
[Busted are] the ones who sell millions of records. Fightstar were never selling millions of records. The rest of Fightstar work for a living (Haigh and Westaway run a production company, Abidi works as a tour manager), and now Simpson does as well, it’s just that he works for Busted.

— Teamrock.com journalist Tom Bryant, 11 November 2015

On 24 September 2014, the band's website was updated to include a countdown timer accompanied by text reading "News ...". The timer ended on 13 October with the announcement of a ten-year anniversary show at the Forum in London. A statement from the band followed: "It has been 10 years since the inception of this band and we wanted to celebrate it with a bang. We want to thank you all for your love and support over the past ten years and we can't wait to commemorate this milestone with you guys." The concert sold out in minutes; due to demand a second concert was scheduled at O2 Academy Brixton for December, which was later postponed until February 2015. With news of the postponement came an announcement of additional dates in Birmingham, Glasgow and Manchester. On 25 February, it was confirmed that the band would be third-stage headliners at the 2015 Download Festival.

On 12 May 2015, Simpson posted on Instagram that Fightstar had returned to the studio to work on new material with producer Carl Bown and began using Twitter for updates on the progress of the album. On 22 July it was announced that the band would release Behind The Devil's Back on 16 October, with a string of UK dates promoting the album to follow. On 26 July the BBC Radio 1 Rock Show introduced "Animal", the band's first new song in five years which was released digitally on iTunes on 7 August.

On 10 November 2015 Simpson reunited with Busted to record new music and tour, saying that Fightstar would continue to tour and release music as a "passion project" for its members. Some music journalists, such as Team Rock's Tom Bryant, speculated that it was due to Fightstar never being particularly financially successful (while Busted remained profitable), but in a Newsbeat interview, Simpson stated that he was swayed due to the chemistry in the studio.

In an interview in April 2019, Simpson confirmed that Fightstar will return at some point in the future, and that he'd also been writing some material for it recently.

On 6 November 2023, Fightstar announced they would be returning for a headline show at OVO Arena Wembley in London on 22 March 2024. Their return marks the band's twenty year anniversary.

== Musical style and influences ==
"Sleep Well Tonight"
Sample of "Sleep Well Tonight", described as a good example of Fightstar's musical dynamics blending "thoroughly heavy metal sections" with "widescreen rock"

Fightstar has been described as post-hardcore, alternative rock, emo, and alternative metal. According to Kerrang!, the band's influences are post-rock, heavy metal and hardcore punk. Simpson echoed this, describing their musical aim as trying to "combine the light and dark shades, to make something utterly brutal and really heavy and on the other side have something really delicate and beautiful. The fusion of those things is what Fightstar does."

Though the band have been labelled emo, they have tried to avoid writing in that fashion. Grand Unification and One Day Son, This Will All Be Yours' themes were apocalyptic, and subsequent work varied from patriotism ("The English Way") to self-loathing ("Damocles" and "Animal"). Fightstar have been influenced by the works of author Chuck Palahniuk, as well as films and comics such as the Neon Genesis Evangelion series.

In his review of Grand Unification (2006), Vik Bansal of musicOMH wrote about their varied dynamics: "Where others are happy to be one-dimensional, Fightstar are not content unless a song moves fluidly through seemingly incongruous but ultimately coherent moods and musical dynamics. The interspersion of thoroughly heavy metal sections within the otherwise widescreen rock of 'Grand Unification Pt I' and 'Sleep Well Tonight' encapsulates this perfectly". One Day Son, This Will All Be Yours showed the band expanding their sound and pushing further into both lighter and heavier territories, with a mixture of more melodic soundscapes and heavier metallic styles. According to Q magazine, "The intricate instrumental passages, multi-tracked vocal harmonies and pounding riffs hint at Muse-scale ambition and intellect".

Fightstar's third album, Be Human (2009), featured choral and orchestral elements. Emma Johnston of Kerrang! emphasised this in her review: "Fightstar throw as many orchestral and choral flourishes at their muscular, solemnly heavy rock as it could take without drowning". Anton Djamoos of AbsolutePunk wrote that the album has a "certain symphonic quality" which is "a departure from the general body of work we've seen in the past. They break from their own norm with several orchestral elements to make the album sound more full and let the music hit even harder". Matt Shoemaker of 411mania.com described the album as typical Fightstar ("[a] range from pure metal to alternative rock to bordering on emo at times"), influenced by progressive rock, acoustic and country pop in addition to its orchestral and choral elements.

Behind the Devil's Back (2015) was noted for a heavier use of electronics than in the past, said by some critics to be reminiscent of Westaway and Haigh's side project Gunship. The Edge and Rocksins.com reviewers remarked in particular the album's 1980s-style synths, while NE:MM writer David Smith drew comparisons to American alternative rock supergroup Angels & Airwaves.

Fightstar have said that they are influenced by a variety of music (particularly film scores), citing Nirvana, Deftones, Radiohead, Silverchair, Pantera, Thrice, Mono, Explosions in the Sky, Elliott Smith, Funeral for a Friend, The Cure and Jeff Buckley as inspirations. Abidi called Deftones the band with whom he would most like to perform: "If I got to play with (them), that'd be it, you could stick a fork in me."

== Members ==
- Charlie Simpson – vocals, lead guitar, piano
- Alex Westaway – vocals, rhythm guitar
- Dan Haigh – bass guitar
- Omar Abidi – drums, percussion

Touring members

- Will Simpson – additional guitars

== Discography ==
- Grand Unification (2006)
- One Day Son, This Will All Be Yours (2007)
- Be Human (2009)
- Behind the Devil's Back (2015)

== Kerrang! Awards ==
Year	Nominee / work	Award	Result
2006	Fightstar	Best British Band	Nominated
