= They Liked You Better When You Were Dead =

EP by Fightstar
- Released: 28 February 2005
- Recorded: November 2004
- Studios: Criterion Studios, London, England
- Genres: Alternative metal; post-hardcore; emo
- Length: 25:39 (EP); 38:39 (Mini-LP)
- Labels: Sandwich Leg; Deep Elm
- Producer: Mark Williams

Fightstar chronology
| They Liked You Better When You Were Dead (2005) | Grand Unification (2006) |

Singles from They Liked Better When You Were Dead
- 1. "Palahniuk's Laughter" Released: January 2005

They Liked You Better When You Were Dead is the debut EP by English rock band Fightstar, released on 28 February 2005 through Sandwich Leg Records. The release proved a critical success, in spite of the cynics' initial expectations of the band. It has been said that the EP helped "present Fightstar as a British rival to the East Coast alternative rock scene". Alex Westaway, the band's lead guitarist and co-lyricist drew the artwork based on Edward Norton for the inlay of the booklet, as the record was inspired by author Chuck Palahniuk and the film adaptation Fight Club.

The UK version contained 5 tracks (including a sixth hidden track), meaning the EP was ineligible for the UK Singles Chart. However, the release proved popular enough to warrant a reprinting on 23 March 2005 which then charted on the singles chart. The music video for "Palahniuk's Laughter" enjoyed heavy rotation on music channels and spent many weeks in charts based on video and radio requests. The EP was released in April 2006 in North America through Deep Elm Records as an extended mini-album.

== Background, writing and recording ==
During 2003, when Charlie Simpson was still an active member of successful pop trio Busted, he met fellow songwriter-guitarist Alex Westaway and drummer Omar Abidi at a party. He was by this stage becoming increasingly frustrated by the music he was performing in Busted and stated he had "all of this creativity pent up inside and I just needed to vent it somewhere, and I was writing a lot of songs but I couldn’t play them, because I didn’t have anyone to play them with".

Westaway subsequently moved into Simpson's spare room after dropping out of university and the pair began writing together. Over the next six months, the EP had been written. Alex later invited school friend, bassist Dan Haigh, to practise with the band and the foursome soon began booking regular rehearsal sessions together. Later, after Simpson had decided to focus on Fightstar full-time, the band entered Criterion Studios in London with producer Mark Williams to begin tracking. Recording sessions were often interrupted as during this period Simpson was in the middle of a sold-out stint of Wembley shows with Busted. Commenting on recording period, Simpson later stated:

This EP was all I cared about. It consumed my mind. It was the first time I'd recorded anything that I loved. I was 18 and we were just kids having fun. It was the most innocent record because we weren't thinking about how it might be received at all. We just wanted to record some songs. There were no limitations: we were just doing it for ourselves. It was such a fun time. I'll always remember those days. We didn't have a care in the world.

The song "Mono", named in honor of the Japanese band of the same name, was recorded during a thunderstorm. Shortly before the track's heavy finale, it's possible to hear the sound of Simpson screaming in the rain after he ran outside, unaware the studio's room mics were capturing his antics. The video for promotional video "Palahniuk's Laughter" was directed by bassist Dan Haigh and was released to music stations shortly after Simpson's official departure from Busted.

== Reception ==
Professional ratings
Review scores
| Source | Rating |
|---|---|
| AllMusic | 3.5/5 stars |
| Aversion | 4/5 stars |
| Kerrang! | 4/5 stars |
| MusicOMH | (favorable) |
| Punknews.org | 2/5 stars |
| Rock Sound | 9/10 |
| Sputnikmusic | 4/5 stars |

Following much scepticism during the band's emergence due to Charlie Simpson's past, things began to turn in the quartet's favour. A string of positive reviews to early live shows were followed by acclaimed reaction to the EPs release.

Allmusic were highly favourable, awarding four stars. They wrote, "At a time when post-hardcore's torch seems to have been almost completely passed to succeeding generations of screamo bands, Fightstar stand firmly enough on the mother country of their genre to do well by the legacy of groups such as Fugazi and Helmet. Vocalists Al Westaway and Charlie Simpson utilize a distinct sound that reaches total catharsis. Train-like guitar work also adds strength to the record, creating drama and tension in the key moments. The driving force behind most of the songs, however, is the rhythm section. The tight bass lines and tighter drumming are what lead each track through its arc, shirking convention when things start to get clichéd".

American music website Aversion awarded the album four stars in their review. They commented; "Few can really channel an obsession with a celebrity into something truly productive – bedroom shrines and mashed potato monuments are just creepy. But four North Londoners known as Fightstar have done just that with their infatuation with Fight Club author, Chuck Palahniuk. Through passionate musicianship that's equal parts serenading melody and jarring punch, these blokes unleash a welcome roundhouse kick to the face of overly sensitive emo rock, triggering crying fits and bloodying scarves".

British rock publication, Kerrang!, awarded an "excellent" four K rating in their review. They wrote, "They Liked You Better When You Were Dead delivers. Articulate rage, barbed guitars and epic choruses recall the likes of Thursday or Brand New. Opener 'Palahniuk's Laughter' floors the listener with a mammoth-rolling riff. 'Speak Up' builds into walls of noise and anguished vocals. The six and a half minutes of 'Mono' are simply majestic, featuring barely audible swirling guitars and whispered vocals that grow into a momentous, bludgeoning roar. Simpson and Westaway play like they have been in the same band for years, weaving intricate soundscapes and dark passages of crushing noise."

Vik Bansal of MusicOMH was also very positive in his review. With regards to Simpson abandoning his former pop career, he stated, "They Liked You Better When You Were Dead is such a good debut EP that the fact Monsieur Simpson used to be part of a heinous crime against humanity's ears is an irrelevant piece of history that will soon be consigned to pub quizzes and trivia board games". He picked out "Mono" as a stand-out track; "'Mono' is the centrepiece of the EP - a brooding slowie that builds into a swathing crescendo of weighty power chords and will have you reaching for the repeat button as soon as it's over". Rock Sound were also full of praise in their review, scoring the album at 9/10; "Fightstar clearly demonstrate that they can hold their own in a world of heavy, emotional rock. Anyone who likes Muse, Biffy Clyro, Radiohead and even Scissorfight will find something to be absorbed in here. Brilliantly executed".

Adam Knott of Sputnikmusic said during his review that the album was, "one of the most surprising first impressions I've ever heard". Awarding an "excellent" four out of five rating, he added; "The combination of grit and beauty is most prominent on 'Until Then', which morphs from an all-out rocker to a softly crooned middle section and back again, and it's this duality which lends itself to multiple listens. To say that Fightstar's debut EP showed promise or potential would be a disservice - They Liked You Better When You Were Dead is in and of itself a release well worthy of a place on any discerning music-lover's bedroom shelf".

== Track listing ==
All lyrics are written by Charlie Simpson and Alex Westaway; all music is composed by Fightstar

Original EP
| No. | Title | Length |
|---|---|---|
| 1. | "Palahniuk's Laughter" | 4:10 |
| 2. | "Speak Up" | 3:27 |
| 3. | "Mono" | 6:26 |
| 4. | "Lost Like Tears in Rain" | 4:07 |
| 5. | "Amethyst" (contains the hidden track "Hazy Eyes") | 7:19 |
| Total length: | | 25:39 |

Mini-LP
| No. | Title | Length |
|---|---|---|
| 1. | "Paint Your Target" | 3:18 |
| 2. | "Palahniuk's Laughter" | 4:10 |
| 3. | "Amethyst" | 4:20 |
| 4. | "Lost Like Tears in Rain" | 4:06 |
| 5. | "Speak Up" | 3:27 |
| 6. | "Until Then" | 4:40 |
| 7. | "Cross Out the Stars" | 5:02 |
| 8. | "Hazy Eyes" | 3:10 |
| 9. | "Mono" | 6:22 |
| Total length: | | 38:39 |

== Personnel ==
The following personnel contributed to They Liked You Better When You Were Dead:

Fightstar

- Charlie Simpson — vocals, rhythm guitar, lyrics
- Alex Westaway — vocals, guitar, artwork, lyrics
- Dan Haigh — bass guitar, design
- Omar Abidi — drums, percussion

Production

- Mark Williams — producer, mixing
- Eric Broyhill — mastering
- Alan Butterworth — photography
- Amy Cooper – photography
- Charlie Hodgson – photography
- Craig Jennings — A&R

== Charts ==
| Chart (2005) | Peak position |
|---|---|
| Scottish Singles Sales (Official Charts) | 88 |
| UK Singles (Official Charts) | 86 |

== Release history ==
| Region | Date | Label | Type | Format | Catalogue # | Ref. |
|---|---|---|---|---|---|---|
| Japan | 25 February 2005 | Universal | EP | Digipack | UICI1043 | |
| Europe | 28 February 2005 | Sandwich Leg | EP | Digipack | CID887 | |
| North America | 12 April 2006 | Deep Elm | Mini-LP | Compact Disc | DER-453 | |
