= Dan Haigh =

British musician

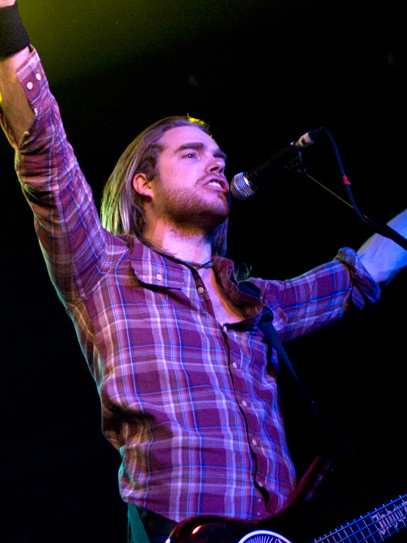
- Haigh with Fightstar in 2010

Background information
- Born: 5 December 1980 (age 45); Grimsby, Lincolnshire, England
- Genres: Synthwave; post-hardcore; alternative rock; alternative metal
- Occupations: Musician; film director; video game designer; writer; visual effects artist
- Instrument: Bass guitar
- Years active: 2003–present
- Member of: Fightstar; Gunship

Dan Haigh (born 5 December 1980) is an English musician, film director, video game designer, writer and visual effects artist. He is best known as co-founder of synthwave band Gunship and as the bass player in the English rock band Fightstar.

== Biography ==
=== Early life ===
Dan Haigh was born in Grimsby, grew up near Louth, and later attended Rugby School.

=== Career ===
==== Fightstar ====
Dan Haigh is a founding member of the band Fightstar, a British rock band from London, formed in 2003. The band's line-up comprises lead vocalist, guitarist and keyboardist Charlie Simpson, guitarist and vocalist Alex Westaway, bassist Dan Haigh and drummer Omar Abidi. Although generally considered a post-hardcore band, Fightstar are commonly known to implement additional metal and alternative rock elements into their sound, as well as several other genres. During the band's initial emergence, they were faced with much skepticism due to Simpson's former pop career. However, they began to receive positive reactions to early live shows and their debut EP, They Liked You Better When You Were Dead (2005), was a critical success. Since then, their four studio albums have all obtained top 40 chartings and critical praise.

Following They Liked You Better When You Were Dead, Fightstar released their debut studio album Grand Unification in 2006. The album was regarded by one critic as "one of the best British rock albums" of the decade. The band went on to receive a nomination at the Kerrang! Awards for "Best British Band", before releasing their second album, One Day Son, This Will All Be Yours in 2007. The following year a compilation album including b-sides and rarities titled, Alternate Endings (2008) was released. The band then self-funded and co-produced their third album, Be Human (2009), which heavily featured orchestral and choral elements.

The band announced an extended hiatus in 2010, allowing its members to concentrate on other projects, including two folk-oriented solo records by Simpson; before announcing their reunion in 2014. The following year, they released their fourth studio album, Behind the Devil's Back, which added electronic elements to their previously known sound. It was their highest-charting album, peaking at number 19 on the UK Albums Chart.

==== Gunship ====
Gunship (stylised as GUNSHIP) is a British Synthwave band formed in 2014 by Dan Haigh and Alex Westaway and later joined by drummer Alex Gingell. GUNSHIP's music has been described as "influenced by the soundtracks of 80s film, television shows, video games & cartoons".

Haigh wrote the following summary of the project: "GUNSHIP is a neon soaked, late night, sonic getaway drive, dripping with luscious analog synthesizers, cinematic vocals and cyberpunk values, exploding from the front cover of a dusty plastic VHS case which has lain forgotten since 1984."

The band are credited with helping to popularize the synthwave scene and evolving it by adding rock song structure and extensive use of vocals to a predominantly instrumental genre.

GUNSHIP have a reputation for creating innovative and interesting music videos and have collaborated with film director John Carpenter on their claymation homage to 1980s nostalgia "Tech Noir" co-written and directed by GUNSHIP and Lee Hardcastle. John Carpenter is quoted as describing GUNSHIP as "nice and cool", and that Gunship's ‘Tech Noir’ is "One of my favorite songs of the year. Gunship rules". He also went on to say "It would be fun to collaborate with Gunship". GUNSHIP have also created the "first music video made in the GTA 5 Rockstar editor" for their song "The Mountain" and made a music video entirely from pixel art with Jason Tammemagi for their song "Revel In Your Time"

The band's self-titled debut album received excellent reviews from both electronic and rock press alike and was credited with sounding simultaneously like "they dropped straight out of the decade itself," and for its excellent modern production. "First of all, the production on this album is absolutely pristine – every fuzzy, reverb-soaked layer of analogue synthesizer sounds perfectly placed in the mix, balanced by melodramatic drum patterns that always stay true to their influence rather than taking a more standard EDM trajectory." Mixed by producer Carl Bown, "It could easily earn a place in synthwave history as one of the first crossover albums". In a commentary about a band, a critic wrote, "There's no doubt the level of effort they put into everything resonates deeply in the 80s retro community and beyond".

Dan Haigh has an extensive synthesizer collection and uses a combination of genuine vintage synthesizers and modern synths to achieve the GUNSHIP sound. The collection includes the Roland Juno-106, Dave Smith Instruments Prophet-12 and Prophet-6, Moog Minimoog, Little Patty, and Mother-32, various Oberheim units, Access Virus TI2, Native Instruments Maschine, ARP Odyssey a Roland D-50.

== Music work ==
=== Film music ===
Dan Haigh has composed music for numerous film projects, including 3rd Letter, Auroras, Supervised, Milk in First, and Mt. Paran.

=== Game music ===
Dan Haigh composed the theme music for the popular WW2 game 'Day Of Defeat: Source'.

== Video game designer ==
When Haigh first saw id software's Doom he knew he had to become involved with game development. Dan grew up playing games on an Amiga 500 and credits some of his favorite early games as Syndicate (Amiga), Doom 2 (PC), Quake (PC), Beneath a Steel Sky (CD32), Blade Runner (PC), Alien Breed (Amiga), and the Monkey Island series.

Haigh was part of the early mod scene and worked on numerous mods including Rocket Arena 3, "Target Quake", and later went onto form Lethargy Software with Alex Gingell whom were responsible for the Quake 1 mission pack "Deaths Dominion" and most notably the "Oblivion" mission pack for Quake 2 which PC Gamer released as a cover disk Haigh and Gingell conceived the game and together managed a team of 10 amateur modders and tackled the bulk of the design work in order to bring the game to life.

Electronic Arts hired Haigh after seeing "Oblivion" and he went to work on his first official title - Quake 3 Revolution.

Haigh later worked for Gearbox Software, pocketeers and Valve.

== Director ==
Dan Haigh co-founded the production company Horsie In The Hedge with Alex Gingell in 2005 and has directed numerous music videos and other film material.

Haigh wrote and directed the video for Tesseract's 'Singularity' with long time collaborators Alex Gingell and Alex Westaway.

Produced by Horsie In The Hedge and Pari Passu films, directing team "Horsie In The Hedge" (Dan Haigh, Alex Gingell, and Alex Westaway) brought together Bafta nominated and Emmy award-winning director of photography Mark Wolf (Blue Planet) and Richard Van den Bergh's team at Evolution VFX (Skyfall) in order to create a visually arresting and cerebrally stimulating music video. At the behest of the directing team the video embraces and celebrates real life practical visual effects, prosthetics and make-up in stark contrast to most modern CGI laden horror / science fiction works. "Can experiences in the mind, if perceived intensely enough, cause manifestations in reality?" is the question driving this exploration of the darker side of the human imagination. The video is deliberately left open to interpretation but also proposes "What if this was possible... and what if foreign entities used this methodology as a conduit for cross-species reproduction..."

Haigh co-wrote and directed the competitive trailer for 'In God We Trust' also known as Human Instrumentality Project. The trailer is heavily influenced by Neon Genesis Evangelion, (as are numerous of Haigh's other creative projects) taking contemporary adaptations of some of its core religious themes.

The first video Dan Haigh directed for Fightstar was a collaboration with Alex Gingell for the song Palaniuk's Laughter.
