= Alex Westaway =

English musician

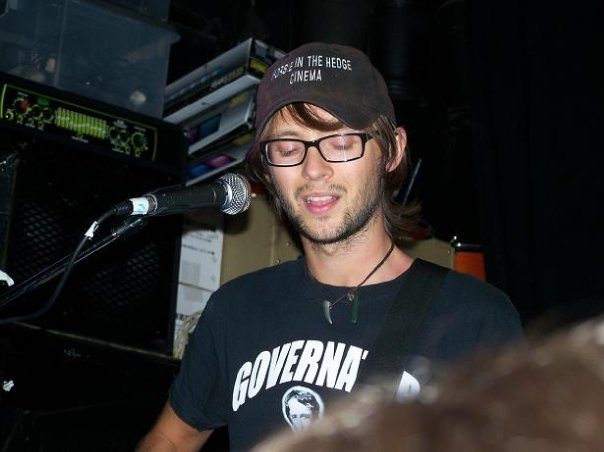
- Acoustic performance in 2009

Background information
- Born: Alexander Derek Westaway
- Origin: Northamptonshire, England
- Genres: Post-hardcore; alternative rock; alternative metal; synthwave
- Occupations: Musician; songwriter; singer
- Instruments: Vocals; guitar; synthesizers
- Years active: 2003–present
- Labels: Gut; Deep Elm; Island
- Member of: Fightstar; Gunship

Alex Westaway is an English musician. He is the lead vocalist of Gunship and co-vocalist and guitarist of the rock band Fightstar alongside Charlie Simpson, Omar Abidi and Dan Haigh.

== Early life ==
Westaway was born and raised in Northamptonshire and attended Rugby School where he met future bandmates and co founders of Horsie In The Hedge LLP, Dan Haigh and Alex Gingell. He has two younger sisters: Hannah, who is married to Dan Haigh, and Fleur, who runs the YouTube channel FleurDeForce.

== Fightstar ==
While he was at university Alex attended a party in 2003 with mutual friend Omar Abidi and the two met Charlie Simpson which led to the formation of Fightstar.

During the early years of Fightstar, Charlie was still an active member of the successful pop-punk band Busted whose sound differed greatly from Fightstar's. However, when Charlie left Busted in January 2005, Fightstar had their first official UK tour and released their first EP They Liked You Better When You Were Dead in February 2005.

Fightstar went on to release three albums; Grand Unification, One Day Son, This Will All Be Yours and Be Human. They announced a hiatus in 2010, but reformed in 2015 announcing a UK tour and the release of a new studio album, Behind The Devil's Back which was released on 16 October 2015 and was their highest-charting record to date.

== Gunship ==
Alex co-founded the synthwave band Gunship alongside Dan Haigh and Alex Gingell. The debut album was released in 2015. Alex and Dan Haigh have scored a number of short films including Grzegorz Jonkajty's The 3rd Letter along with Audrey Riley. The film picked up several awards from various film festivals across the world.

== Equipment ==
Westaway's most commonly used guitars are:

- Fender Telecaster American Standard customized with single active EMG pickups.
- Fender Stratocaster American Standard
- Gibson SG New Century
- Gibson SG Special with EMG pickups

Amps:

- Peavey 5150
- VHT Pitbull head

Pedals:

- Boss TU-2
- Boss TR-2
- MXR Smart-Gate
- Boss RV-5
- Boss DD-7
