= Memory Lane: The Best of McFly =

Compilation album by McFly
- Released: 26 November 2012
- Length: 78:22 (standard); 142:19 (deluxe)
- Label: Island

McFly chronology
Above the Noise (2010)	Memory Lane: The Best of McFly (2012)	Young Dumb Thrills (2020)

Singles from Memory Lane: The Best of McFly
- 1. "Love Is Easy" Released: 11 November 2012

Memory Lane: The Best of McFly is the second greatest hits compilation released by the English pop rock band McFly. It was released on 26 November 2012 as a retrospective of the band's nine-year career to date, containing a number of the band's hit singles, but most notably not including "I Wanna Hold You", "Ultraviolet/The Ballad of Paul K", "Please, Please", "Sorry's Not Good Enough", "Baby's Coming Back", "Stay with Me" or "That's the Truth". The album was preceded by the release of a brand new single, "Love Is Easy", and includes four other new tracks, "Do Whatcha", "Down Down", "Mess Around You" and "Cherry Cola".

A deluxe edition of the album includes a number of the band's most famous B-sides, unreleased demo versions from previous album recording sessions and other popular tracks from their back catalogue of albums. The album was made available to pre-order from 13 October 2012. Personalised copies of the album can be created and ordered via Mixpixie.

== Background ==
During the band's second theatre tour, the Keep Calm and Play Louder Tour, they premiered three brand new songs: "Do Whatcha", "Red" and "Touch the Rain". It was confirmed soon after by band member Tom Fletcher via Twitter that the band's next single would be the track "Red", as it had been very well received on the tour. However, in September 2012, the band travelled to the United States to play four dates in Los Angeles and New York, during which they premiered a fourth new single, "Love is Easy", and it was soon announced that this would in fact be released as the band's next single, instead of "Red", and that it would precede the release of the band's second retrospective release, Memory Lane: The Best of McFly. It was also announced that in promotion of the album, the band would be releasing their autobiography, Unsaid Things: Our Story. With the announcement of the track listing for Memory Lane in October 2012, "Love is Easy" and "Do Whatcha" were present, but "Red" and "Touch the Rain" were not, but instead had been held back for the band's sixth studio album, in favour of three other new tracks: "Cherry Cola", "Down Down" and "Mess Around You". "Love is Easy" was released on 11 November 2012, going on to peak at No. 10 on the UK Singles Chart, and was premiered on BBC Radio 2 Graham Norton at 10:55 on 20 October 2012. The music video for the track was premiered on 9 October 2012.

== Track listing ==
The track listing of the album was confirmed on 11 October 2012, via Digital Spy. Disc two was originally set to contain the B-side track "Easy Way Out". However, pressings of the album do not contain the track, and it has been removed from all digital versions of the album, for reasons unknown. The standard version contains disc one only, and the deluxe version contains both discs.

No.	Title	Writer(s)	Original appearance	Length
1.	"Love Is Easy"	Tom Fletcher; Danny Jones; Dougie Poynter	Previously unreleased	3:41
2.	"Shine a Light" (featuring Taio Cruz)	Taio Cruz; Fletcher; Jones; Poynter; Harry Judd	Above the Noise	3:39
3.	"Party Girl"	Dallas Austin; Fletcher; Poynter; Jones; Judd	Above the Noise	3:11
4.	"Falling in Love"	Fletcher; Jones; Jason Perry	Radio:Active	4:27
5.	"Do Ya"	Fletcher; Jones; Poynter; James Bourne	Radio:Active	2:54
6.	"Lies"	Fletcher; Poynter; Jones	Radio:Active	3:45
7.	"One for the Radio"	Fletcher	Radio:Active	3:06
8.	"The Heart Never Lies"	Fletcher	All the Greatest Hits	3:26
9.	"Transylvania"	Fletcher; Poynter	Motion in the Ocean	4:10
10.	"Friday Night"	Daniel Carter; Julian Emery; Fletcher; Jones; Perry; Poynter	Motion in the Ocean	3:22
11.	"Star Girl"	Carter; Emery; Fletcher; Perry; Poynter; Jones; Judd	Motion in the Ocean	3:28
12.	"Don't Stop Me Now"	Freddie Mercury	Motion in the Ocean	3:20
13.	"I'll Be OK"	Fletcher; Jones; Poynter	Wonderland	3:24
14.	"All About You"	Fletcher	Wonderland	3:06
15.	"Room on the Third Floor"	Fletcher; Jones	Room on the 3rd Floor	3:16
16.	"Obviously"	Bourne; Fletcher; Jones	Room on the 3rd Floor	3:18
17.	"Five Colours in Her Hair"	Bourne; Fletcher; Jones; Ben Sargeant	Room on the 3rd Floor	2:58
18.	"Do Watcha"	Fletcher; Jones; Poynter	Previously unreleased	3:12
19.	"Cherry Cola"	Fletcher; Jones; Poynter	Previously unreleased	3:03
20.	"That Girl" (Original 2003 Demo)	Bourne; Fletcher	Previously unreleased	2:53
21.	"Obviously" (Original 2003 Demo)	Bourne; Fletcher; Jones	Previously unreleased	3:18
22.	"Memory Lane"	Bourne; Fletcher	Wonderland	4:40

Deluxe Edition bonus disc
No.	Title	Writer(s)	Original appearance	Length
1.	"Umbrella"	Jay-Z, Kuk Harrell, Terius Nash, Christopher "Tricky" Stewart	The Heart Never Lies B-side	4:05
2.	"Lola" (featuring Busted)	Ray Davies	Five Colours in Her Hair B-side	4:13
3.	"The Guy Who Turned Her Down"	Tom Fletcher, James Bourne	Five Colours in Her Hair B-side	3:58
4.	"Get Over You"	Tom Fletcher, James Bourne	Room on the Third Floor	2:34
5.	"You've Got a Friend"	Carole King	All About You B-side	4:27
6.	"No Worries"	Tom Fletcher, James Bourne, Charlie Simpson	I'll Be OK B-side	2:56
7.	"Silence Is A Scary Sound" (Live at the Manchester Arena)	Dougie Poynter	Motion in the Ocean	3:24
8.	"Sunny Side of the Street" (Demo)	Tom Fletcher, Danny Jones, Anthony Brant	Party Girl B-side	3:14
9.	"Memory Lane" (Original 2003 Demo)	Tom Fletcher, James Bourne	Previously unreleased	3:17
10.	"Surfer Babe" (Original 2003 Demo)	Tom Fletcher, James Bourne	Previously unreleased	2:35
11.	"Ignorance"	Dougie Poynter	The Heart Never Lies B-side	3:00
12.	"Down Down"	McFly	Previously unreleased	3:23
13.	"Mess Around You"	McFly	Previously unreleased	2:07
14.	"Rockin' Robin"	Jimmie Thomas	Sorry's Not Good Enough B-side	2:35
15.	"POV"	Tom Fletcher	Radio:Active	3:54
16.	"She Loves You"	John Lennon, Paul McCartney	That Girl B-side	2:14
17.	"Mr. Brightside"	Brandon Flowers, Dave Keuning	I Wanna Hold You B-side	3:14
18.	"Little Joanna"	Tom Fletcher, Dougie Poynter, Danny Jones, Matthew Fletcher	Motion in the Ocean	3:56
19.	"Bubblewrap"	Tom Fletcher	Motion in the Ocean	5:12
20.	"Five Colours in Her Hair" (US Version)	Tom Fletcher, Danny Jones, James Bourne	All The Greatest Hits	3:06

iTunes Store bonus content
No.	Title	Writer(s)	Original appearance	Length
21.	"Love Is Easy" (Dougie Style)	Tom Fletcher, Danny Jones, Dougie Poytner	Previously unreleased	3:53
22.	"Love Is Easy" (Live ukulele version)	Tom Fletcher, Danny Jones, Dougie Poytner	Previously unreleased	3:53
23.	"Love Is Easy" (Music Video)	Tom Fletcher, Danny Jones, Dougie Poytner	Previously unreleased	3:53

== Tour ==
The Best of McFly Tour
- Tour by McFly
- Associated album: Memory Lane: The Best of McFly
- Start date: 19 April 2013
- End date: 18 May 2013
- Legs: 1
- No. of shows: 20

McFly concert chronology
- Keep Calm & Play Louder Tour (2012); The Best of McFly Tour (2013); "The Anthology Tour" (2016)

In promotion of the album, McFly toured across the United Kingdom in April and May 2013 with 21 performances, with an extra show at Scarborough added in August. The tour ended with the biggest performance at Wembley Arena and was supported by The Vamps. There were originally eighteen shows but a further two more for Glasgow and Manchester were added and a date for Scarborough was also added for August and then another gig for June had been added for Gloucester Kingsholm stadium. Tickets went on sale from 8 December 2012 at 9 am and the dates were first confirmed during the Super City: Battle of the Bands in November 2012.

=== Tour dates ===
19 April – Swindon Oasis
20 April – Birmingham Academy
22 April – Nottingham, Royal Centre
23 April – Reading, The Hexagon
25 April – Newcastle Academy
27 April – Glasgow SECC Clyde Auditorium
28 April – Glasgow SECC Clyde Auditorium
30 April – Sheffield City Hall
1 May – Leeds Academy
3 May – Manchester, Apollo
4 May – Manchester, Apollo^
6 May – Leicester, De Montfort Hall
7 May – Cambridge Corn Exchange
9 May – Bournemouth International Centre
10 May – Cardiff Motorpoint Arena
11 May – Wolverhampton Civic Hall
13 May – Bristol, Colston Hall
14 May – Portsmouth Guildhall
16 May – Brighton Centre
18 May – London, Wembley Arena
30 August – Scarborough Open Air Theatre

^ – Extra dates

=== Set list ===
1. Memory Lane [a capella]
2. That Girl
3. Star Girl
4. Transylvania
5. Five Colours in Her Hair
6. Falling in Love
7. Room on the 3rd Floor
8. Obviously
9. Corrupted
10. Nowhere Left To Run
11. Lies
12. I'll Be OK
13. Bubblewrap
14. Smile
15. Shine A Light
16. One for the Radio
17. Memory Lane

Encore
18. Love Is Easy
19. All About You
20. The Heart Never Lies

=== Notes ===
The opening was introduced with "Memory Lane" being played with the lyrics, 'So much has changed', repeated without any instruments before "That Girl" was played but, however, the whole song is played before the encore. Only the first half of "Transylvania" was played and "I'll Be OK" was played as a quieter version with only a piano.

== Charts ==
Weekly chart performance for Memory Lane: The Greatest Hits
Chart (2012)	Peak position
Irish Albums (IRMA)	79
Scottish Albums (OCC)	26
UK Albums (OCC)	21

== Certifications ==
Region	Certification	Certified units/sales
United Kingdom (BPI)	Platinum	300,000^{‡}
^{‡} Sales+streaming figures based on certification alone.

== Release history ==
Region	Date	Label(s)	Formats
United Kingdom	26 November 2012	Island Records, Universal	Digital download, CD
Spain	27 November 2012	Island Records, Universal	Digital download, CD
Japan	16 January 2013	Island Records, Universal	Digital download, CD
