= McBusted Tour =

2014 concert tour by McBusted

- Tour by McBusted
- Original poster for the tour, showing the original 11 dates
- Location: UK and Ireland
- Start date: 17 April 2014
- End date: 29 June 2014
- Legs: 1
- No. of shows: 36
- Website: www.mcbusted.com
McFly tour chronology
The Best of McFly Tour
(2013)
McBusted Tour
(2014)
McBusted's Most Excellent Adventure Tour
(2015)
Busted tour chronology
Present for Everyone Else Tour (2004)	McBusted Tour (2014)	McBusted's Most Excellent Adventure Tour (2015)

The McBusted Tour was a 2014 concert tour by English supergroup McBusted, composed of members of pop rock bands McFly and Busted. It consisted of 36 shows around cities in the United Kingdom and the Republic of Ireland from April–June 2014. The tour began on 17 April in Glasgow and ended on 27 June in Scarborough.

== Background ==
From 19 to 22 September 2013, Matt Willis and James Bourne made a surprise brief reunion as Busted when they joined McFly as special guests during McFly's four 10th anniversary concerts at the Royal Albert Hall. Willis and Bourne's ex-bandmate Charlie Simpson, whose decision to quit Busted led to the band's break-up in January 2005, chose not to take part at the concerts. Under the name "McBusted", the six-piece performed Busted's "Year 3000" and "Air Hostess" and McFly's "Shine a Light". This sparked rumours that Busted could make a comeback. On 11 November 2013, it was announced that Bourne and Willis would join Tom Fletcher, Danny Jones, Dougie Poynter and Harry Judd and go on an eleven-date arena tour in April and May 2014 as McBusted, playing both Busted and McFly songs. Simpson refused to be a part of McBusted as he wanted to focus on his own career, but he was paid a six-figure sum by Willis and Bourne after he sold his third of the copyrighted Busted name. A source told the Daily Mirror that Simpson's decision not to be part of McBusted was an amicable one: "Charlie wishes the boys lots of luck but he wanted absolutely no involvement. All three sat down amicably and worked out a figure that everyone was happy with. Charlie made it clear in no uncertain terms that that's it for him and the boys now, it's finished."

Pre-sale tickets for the eleven shows went on sale at 9am on 14 November and sold out in minutes. Tickets went on general sale the following morning and quickly sold out as well, resulting in the addition of six more concerts in Glasgow, Bournemouth, London, Birmingham, Cardiff and Manchester. Another four dates were then added on 17 November, bringing the tour to 20 dates. Since then, the tour has increased to a total 34 dates throughout April–June 2014. It comprises dates in Glasgow, Liverpool, Bournemouth, London, Newcastle, Nottingham, Leeds, Birmingham, Sheffield, Cardiff, Manchester, Brighton, Dublin and Belfast. Due to high demand, a section called the OMFG! Zone has been made available across their UK tour (excluding Bournemouth and Brighton). This area is sectioned off from the rest of the venue and is the closest to the stage. There is also opportunity to upgrade from standard tickets to the OMFG! Zone at ticket outlets.

== Support acts ==
From opening night until 10 May, the support acts were Young Brando and EofE (both British 4-piece bands) and The 3 Dudes (an American 3-piece band). From 11 May onwards, Hollywood Ending (another 5-piece American band) replaced The 3 Dudes, and Vix (female fronted band) replaced Young Brando. 5ive also opened up for the band in June.

== Recordings and broadcasts ==
At the 25 April show at The O2 Arena, the band revealed that the show will be recorded and released on DVD and Blu-ray later in the year. On 10 September, it was announced that a McBusted concert film Tourplay would be released exclusively through Vue Cinemas on 28 October for one day. Both Tourplay and McBusted: Live at The O2 was released on 24 November 2014.

== Concerts following tour ==
On 6 July 2014, McBusted headlined Hyde Park, where they were supported by the Backstreet Boys, Scouting for Girls and dance troupe Diversity. The band also supported One Direction at a stadium show in Paris on 21 June.

== Tour dates ==
Date	City	Country	Venue
UK and Ireland
17 April 2014	Glasgow	Scotland	SSE Hydro
18 April 2014	Glasgow	Scotland	SSE Hydro
19 April 2014	Liverpool	England	Echo Arena Liverpool
21 April 2014	Bournemouth	England	Windsor Hall
22 April 2014	Bournemouth	England	Windsor Hall
24 April 2014	London	England	The O_{2} Arena
25 April 2014	London	England	The O_{2} Arena
26 April 2014	London	England	The O_{2} Arena
28 April 2014	Newcastle	England	Metro Radio Arena
29 April 2014	Nottingham	England	Capital FM Arena Nottingham
30 April 2014	Leeds	England	First Direct Arena
2 May 2014	Birmingham	England	LG Arena
3 May 2014	Birmingham	England	LG Arena
4 May 2014	Sheffield	England	Motorpoint Arena Sheffield
6 May 2014	Cardiff	Wales	Motorpoint Arena Cardiff
7 May 2014	Cardiff	Wales	Motorpoint Arena Cardiff
9 May 2014	Manchester	England	Phones 4u Arena $2,351,790 35,123 / 37,908
10 May 2014	Manchester	England	Phones 4u Arena $2,351,790 35,123 / 37,908
11 May 2014	Manchester	England	Phones 4u Arena $2,351,790 35,123 / 37,908
13 May 2014	Liverpool	England	Echo Arena Liverpool
15 May2014	Glasgow	Scotland	SSE Hydro
16 May 2014	Glasgow	Scotland	SSE Hydro
17 May 2014	Birmingham	England	LG Arena
19 May 2014	Sheffield	England	Motorpoint Arena Sheffield
20 May 2014	Nottingham	England	Capital FM Arena Nottingham
21 May 2014	Newcastle	England	Metro Radio Arena
23 May 2014	Cardiff	Wales	Motorpoint Arena Cardiff
24 May 2014	Brighton	England	Brighton Centre
25 May 2014	Brighton	England	Brighton Centre
27 May 2014	Birmingham	England	LG Arena
28 May 2014	Bournemouth	England	Windsor Hall
29 May 2014	Bournemouth	England	Windsor Hall
31 May 2014	Belfast	Northern Ireland	Odyssey Arena
1 June 2014	Belfast	Northern Ireland	Odyssey Arena
2 June 2014	Dublin	Ireland	The O_{2}
27 June 2014	Scarborough	England	Scarborough Open Air Theatre
28 June 2014	Weston-super-Mare	England	Weston Beach
29 June 2014	Ipswich	England	Chantry Park

== Setlist ==
1. "Air Hostess"
2. "Crash & Burn/You Said No"
3. "Britney"
4. "Who's David?"
5. "5 Colours in Her Hair"
6. "Obviously"
7. "Sleeping with the Light On"
8. "Star Girl"
9. "Nerdy"
10. "Room on the 3rd Floor"
11. "Thunderbirds Are Go"
12. "I Want You Back" (The Jackson 5 cover)
13. "Shine a Light"
14. "What I Go to School For"

Encore

15. "Crashed the Wedding"
16. "All About You"
17. "Year 3000"
