= Little Hands (album) =

Compilation album by Charlie Simpson
- Released: 6 May 2016
- Recorded: 2010–16
- Genre: Acoustic
- Language: English
- Label: NUA Entertainment
- Producer: Sam Featherstone

Charlie Simpson chronology
Long Road Home (2014)	Little Hands (2016)	Hope Is a Drug (2022)

Singles from Little Hands
- 1. "Walking with the San (From 'Singing in the Rainforest')" Released: 28 September 2015

Little Hands is the third studio album by English singer-songwriter Charlie Simpson, and first solo release since his reunion with Busted. The album features a collection of songs written and recorded between 2010 and 2016, including a re-recorded version of "Emily", a track from his 2014 album Long Road Home. It was preceded by the lead and only single, "Walking with the San (From 'Singing in the Rainforest')", released on 28 September 2015.

== Background ==
Simpson first mentioned the release in a newsletter to subscribers of his website in late 2015, stating:

Over the past few weeks I've recorded a collection of new songs and covers with my good friend and producer Sam Featherstone at Price Studios in London. One of the new tracks is called 'Little Hands', which was written about having a baby, before I even knew that my wife was pregnant! I have also recorded a new intimate version of 'Emily', one of my favourite songs from Long Road Home, and we've edited it into a video with some of the amazing footage from my show at the Roundhouse last year. These new recordings will be released as an album soon, so stay tuned...

On 6 April 2016, NUA Entertainment released a statement announcing the release date for the album. The album was described as "in celebration of the sell-out Busted reunion tour", and a collection of un-released and re-recorded songs. To accompany the announcement, a trailer for the album was uploaded to YouTube featuring a short snippet of the song title-track 'Little Hands'.

The album also features unplugged versions of "Parachutes" from his 2011 album Young Pilgrim and "Long Road Home" from his 2014 album, along with a cover of Bon Iver's "Re: Stacks".

== Track listing ==
No.	Title	From	Length
1.	"Emily" (Reworked version)	Long Road Home	4:22
2.	"Little Hands"	Previously unreleased	4:10
3.	"Walking with the San"	Previously unreleased	3:32
4.	"Barricades of Heaven"	Farmer and His Gun B-Side	4:53
5.	"If I Hide, Will You Come Looking?"	When We Were Lions EP	2:34
6.	"Parachutes" (Unplugged)	Young Pilgrim	3:43
7.	"Re: Stacks"	Cemetery B-Side	6:07
8.	"Long Road Home" (Unplugged)	Long Road Home	3:17
9.	"Lost"	When We Were Lions EP	3:39
10.	"The Day Texas Sank to the Bottom of the Sea"	Previously unreleased	8:28
Total length:			44:41

== Release history ==
Region	Date	Label	Format	Catalogue #	Ref.
United Kingdom	6 May 2016	NUA Entertainment	CD, digital download,	B01DX0EIAG	
