= McBusted's Most Excellent Adventure Tour =

2015 concert tour by McBusted

- Tour by McBusted
- Official poster for the tour, showing all 21 dates.
- Location: UK and Ireland
- Start date: 12 March 2015
- End date: 22 April 2015
- Legs: 1
- No. of shows: 21
- Website: www.mcbusted.com
McBusted tour chronology
McBusted Tour (2014)	McBusted's Most Excellent Adventure Tour (2015)

McBusted's Most Excellent Adventure Tour is a 2015 concert tour by English supergroup McBusted, composed of members of pop rock bands McFly and Busted.

== Background ==
The second McBusted tour, to support their debut self-titled album. On 4 November 2014, the band posted on their Twitter and Facebook pages: "It's possibly the worst kept secret in entertainment, but we are so stoked to announce the #McBusted2015Tour!!!" On 26 January 2015, on their website, they announced that the tour would be called McBusted's Most Excellent Adventure Tour. The tour lasted from 12 March to 22 April 2015, consisting of 21 shows. McBusted were also the support act for the Australian and European legs of One Direction's On the Road Again Tour in 2015. During the Australian dates, McBusted announced and performed two of their own gigs, one in Sydney and one in Melbourne. A music video was shot for their song "Get Over It" in 2014 with the intention of releasing it as a single the next year. However James Bourne confirmed on Twitter that the release was scrapped. A DVD and Blu-ray release of the 2015 tour, McBusted's Most Excellent Adventure Tour – Live at the O2, was released on 22 June 2015 and reached number one in the music video charts. The name of the tour is likely a reference to the 1989 comedy Bill & Ted's Excellent Adventure.

== Support acts ==
- Symmetry
- New City Kings
- Hometown

== Tour dates ==
Date	City	Country	Venue
12 March 2015	Glasgow	Scotland	SSE Hydro
13 March 2015	Glasgow	Scotland	SSE Hydro
16 March 2015	Newcastle	England	Metro Radio Arena
18 March 2015	Leeds	England	First Direct Arena
21 March 2015	Manchester	England	Manchester Arena
22 March 2015	Manchester	England	Manchester Arena
24 March 2015	Sheffield	England	Motorpoint Arena Sheffield
28 March 2015	Birmingham	England	Barclaycard Arena
29 March 2015	Birmingham	England	Barclaycard Arena
31 March 2015	Liverpool	England	Echo Arena Liverpool
4 April 2015	London	England	The O_{2} Arena
5 April 2015	London	England	The O_{2} Arena
7 April 2015	Brighton	England	Brighton Centre
9 April 2015	Cardiff	Wales	Motorpoint Arena Cardiff
10 April 2015	Cardiff	Wales	Motorpoint Arena Cardiff
13 April 2015	Bournemouth	England	Bournemouth BIC
15 April 2015	Bournemouth	England	Bournemouth BIC
18 April 2015	Nottingham	England	Capital FM Arena Nottingham
19 April 2015	Nottingham	England	Capital FM Arena Nottingham
21 April 2015	Dublin	Ireland	3Arena
22 April 2015	Belfast	Northern Ireland	Odyssey Arena

== Setlist ==
Main stage:

1. "Air Guitar"
2. "Hate Your Guts"
3. "One for the Radio"
4. "Thunderbirds Are Go"
5. "Get Over It"
6. "You Said No"
7. "3AM"
8. "What Happened to Your Band?"

B – Stage:

9. "Air Hostess"
10. "What I Go to School For"
11. "Obviously"
12. "Beautiful Girls Are the Loneliest"

"Here Comes The Bride" Interlude:

13. "Crashed the Wedding"
14. "Riding on My Bike"
15. "All About You"
16. "Star Girl"

Encore:

17. "5 Colours in Her Hair"
18. "Shine a Light"
19. "Year 3000"

Notes:

- At Nottingham Capital FM Arena on the 19th of April, "Crashed the Wedding" followed "What Happened To Your Band?" but the rest of the set list remained the same thereafter. There was no "B-Stage" at this date, which is the reason for the set list change.
- During "Riding On My Bike", James rides a bicycle on stage throwing T-shirts into the audience.
- During the interlude to the B – Stage, the band descends onto the B – Stage in the same DeLorean used for the opening sequence of the McBusted Tour.
