= Young Dumb Thrills =

2020 studio album by McFly

Studio album by McFly
- Released: 13 November 2020
- Recorded: 2019–2020
- Length: 45:06
- Label: BMG
- Producer: Danny Jones, Jason Perry

McFly chronology
Memory Lane: The Best of McFly (2012)	Young Dumb Thrills (2020)	Power to Play (2023)

Singles from Young Dumb Thrills
- 1. "Happiness" Released: 20 July 2020; 2. "Growing Up" Released: 4 September 2020; 3. "Tonight Is the Night" Released: 1 October 2020; 4. "You’re Not Special" Released: 21 January 2021

Young Dumb Thrills is the sixth studio album from English pop rock band McFly. Their first studio album since 2010, the album was released on 13 November 2020, and is their first under record label BMG.

The album debuted at number 2 in the UK, with 20,750 sales in its first week. It became the band's highest-charting album since Wonderland in 2005.

== Background ==
In November 2010, McFly released their fifth studio album, Above the Noise, which became their lowest charting album in the UK. This was followed by a compilation album, Memory Lane: The Best of McFly, in November 2012. In 2013, McFly's sixth studio album was put on hold when they teamed up with Matt Willis and James Bourne from Busted to form the supergroup McBusted. After two years of touring and a self-titled album, Willis and Bourne's former bandmate Charlie Simpson agreed to return to Busted, thus bringing McBusted to an end.

On 3 July 2020, McFly announced The Lost Songs, a collection of demo recordings and their first unreleased material in nearly a decade. That same month, the band revealed that their long-awaited sixth studio album would be called Young Dumb Thrills, and also announced "Happiness" as its lead single. The track "Wild and Young" was initially going to be released as part of Danny Jones' debut solo album, but was instead used for McFly's comeback album when the band reunited.

== Singles ==
"Happiness" was released as the album's lead single on 20 July 2020.

"Growing Up" featuring Mark Hoppus was the second, released on 4 September 2020. Judd stated on Twitter that this was a promotional single, and not an official single. It failed to chart on the UK Singles Top 100 but debuted and peaked at number 80 on the Official Singles Sales Chart Top 100 on 11 September 2020.

"Tonight Is the Night" was the third single, released on 1 October 2020.

"You’re Not Special" is the fourth single, released 21 January 2021.

== Track listing ==
Young Dumb Thrills track listing
No.	Title	Writer(s)	Producer(s)	Length
1.	"Happiness"	Tom Fletcher; Danny Jones; Dougie Poynter; Harry Judd; Jordan Cardy; Jason Perry; Oberdan Oliveira	Jason Perry	3:14
2.	"Another Song About Love"	Fletcher; Jones; Poynter; Judd; Perry	Jones; Perry	2:59
3.	"You're Not Special"	Fletcher; Jones; Poynter; Judd	Jones; Perry	3:25
4.	"Head Up"	Fletcher; Jones; Poynter; Judd; Perry; Cardy	Jones; Perry	3:46
5.	"Tonight Is the Night"	Fletcher; Jones; Poynter; Judd; Perry; Cardy	Jones; Perry	3:56
6.	"Young Dumb Thrills" (featuring Rat Boy)	Fletcher; Jones; Poynter; Judd; Perry; Cardy; Todd Dorigo	Jones; Perry	4:10
7.	"Growing Up" (featuring Mark Hoppus)	Fletcher; Jones; Poynter; Judd; Perry; Jordan Cardy; Mark Hoppus	Jones; Perry; Hoppus	2:48
8.	"Mad About You"	Fletcher; Jones; Poynter; Judd; Perry; Cardy	Jones; Perry	4:54
9.	"Sink or Sing"	Fletcher; Jones; Poynter; Judd	Jones; Perry	3:31
10.	"Like I Can"	Fletcher; Jones; Poynter; Judd	Jones; Perry	3:01
11.	"Wild and Young"	Fletcher; Jones; Poynter; Judd; Jake Gosling; Chris Leonard; Zachary Pajak	Jones; Perry	3:56
12.	"Not the End"	Fletcher; Jones; Poynter; Judd	Jones; Perry	5:25
Total length:				45:06

== Charts ==
Chart performance for Young Dumb Thrills
Chart (2020)	Peak position
Irish Albums (OCC)	23
Scottish Albums (OCC)	4
UK Albums (OCC)	2
