= The Lost Songs =

2019 studio album by McFly

Studio album by McFly
- Released: 3 July 2020
- Recorded: 2011−2013
- Genre: Pop rock, pop
- Label: Super Records
- Producer: Danny Jones, Jason Perry

McFly chronology
Memory Lane: The Best of McFly (2012)	The Lost Songs (2020)	Young Dumb Thrills (2020)

The Lost Songs is a collection of demo recordings released by English pop rock band McFly in 2019 and 2020. The songs were originally intended for the band's sixth studio album which was then shelved. McFly recorded a full album in 2011 before focusing on supergroup McBusted.

One song from the collection was released per week leading up to the band's concert in the O2 Arena in London on 20 November 2019, marking the end of a three-year hiatus. The release of the songs was accompanied by a YouTube series of the same name, in which the band discussed one song per episode. The collection was initially only available on streaming but it has since been released on digital downloads.

== Track listing ==
All tracks are written by Tom Fletcher, Danny Jones and Dougie Poynter, except where noted.

No.	Title	Music	Length
1.	"Red"		3.24
2.	"Touch the Rain"		4.28
3.	"We Were Only Kids"		4.49
4.	"Hyperion"		6.09
5.	"Dare You to Move"	Fletcher, Jones, Anthony Kluge, Poynter	4.26
6.	"Break Me"		4.34
7.	"Corner of My Mind"	Bourne, Fletcher	3.49
8.	"Something About You"	James Bourne, Fletcher, Poynter	2.47
9.	"Those Were the Days" (feat. Ximena Sariñana)	Fletcher, Jones, John King, Poynter, Lindy Robbins	3.37
10.	"Josephine"	Fletcher, Jones, Harry Judd	4.06
11.	"Lucky Ones"	Bourne, Fletcher, Jones, Poynter	3.42
12.	"Man On Fire"	Fletcher, Bourne	3.58
13.	"Pretty Girls"	Fletcher, Bourne	3.38
Total length:			53:00
