= Room on the 3rd Floor =

Studio album by McFly
- Released: 5 July 2004
- Recorded: December 2003 – April 2004, London, England
- Genres: Surf rock; pop rock; pop punk
- Length: 37:42
- Label: Universal Island
- Producers: Craig Hardy; Hugh Padgham; Tim 'Spag' Speight; Jay Renolds

McFly chronology
Room on the 3rd Floor (2004)	Wonderland (2005)

Singles from Room on the 3rd Floor
- 1. "5 Colours in Her Hair" Released: 29 March 2004; 2. "Obviously" Released: 21 June 2004; 3. "That Girl" Released: 6 September 2004; 4. "Room on the 3rd Floor" Released: 15 November 2004

Professional ratings
Review scores
Source	Rating
AllMusic	3/5 stars
DIY	3/5 stars
Gigwise	3/5 stars
The Guardian	4/5 stars
The Observer	4/5 stars

Room on the 3rd Floor is the debut studio album by English pop rock band McFly. It was released on 5 July 2004 in the United Kingdom via Island Records, and was later issued in the United States by Island Def Jam Records via the iTunes Store.

The album debuted at number one on the UK Albums Chart, breaking the world record for the youngest ever band with a number-one album, a record previously held by The Beatles. It reached the top of the charts after selling over 61,000 copies in its first week. The album has been certified 2× Platinum in the UK for sales of over 600,000 copies. The album won Best Album at the 2004 Smash Hits Awards. As of 2014, the album has sold over 2 million copies worldwide.

== Background ==
In 2001, Tom Fletcher auditioned for pop punk band Busted; it was the same audition Charlie Simpson was at. Fletcher was originally accepted as part of Busted's line-up, but Island Records went on to reassess the situation and eventually decided to have the band as a three-piece rather than a four-piece. Though the record label decided against offering Fletcher a place in Busted, they were intrigued by his songwriting talents and later offered him a place on Busted's songwriting 'team', alongside band member (and already accomplished songwriter) James Bourne, whom Fletcher credits with helping him to compose melodies.

While writing Busted's second album, A Present for Everyone, Fletcher was asked by the record label if he was available to film auditions for a new band, V. It was at this time that Jones and Fletcher met for the first time; Danny Jones went to the audition mistaking the band to be an instrumental band rather than the conventional, all-singing, all-dancing boy band, for which they were intended. Fletcher was impressed with Jones' unique style and so approached and invited him to write with himself and Bourne. When writing projects for Busted had come to an end, the two began collaborating for their own (yet unnamed) band and, eventually, moved into the InterContinental Hotel in London for two months, (while still receiving help from Bourne) to concentrate on writing together. Bassist Dougie Poynter and drummer Harry Judd were subsequently recruited via a classified advertisement in the NME magazine. The pair, both Essex lads, coincidentally turned up at the same audition and got to talking over their shared appreciation of the band The Starting Line, after Poynter noticed their name and logo was printed on Judd's T-shirt.

The album was named after the hotel room where most of the songs were written. The album's main songwriters include band members Fletcher and Jones, as well as contributions from James Bourne from the band Busted, as well as some of Busted's main producers. The album is directly influenced by three things: modern pop punk, 1960s surfer pop, and tales of unrequited love. The track "Get Over You" is hidden, and does not appear on the track listing. It can be accessed by rewinding into the pregap, prior to the first track, "Five Colours in Her Hair". The track cannot be accessed if the album is played in a computer. The song was later released as a regular track on the deluxe edition of the band's 2012 compilation album Memory Lane: The Best of McFly. Four singles were released from the album: "Five Colours in Her Hair" and "Obviously", which both went to number one, "That Girl", which reached number three, and the title track, "Room on the 3rd Floor", which peaked at five. A demo version of the track "Saturday Night" was previously released as "Saturday Nite" on the B-side of the "Five Colours in Her Hair" single. The international version of the album removes the songs "Broccoli" and "Surfer Babe" for contractual reasons. This version also features alternate artwork – the colour of the band logo is altered from yellow to red.

== Critical reception ==
Sharon Mawer of AllMusic said of the album: "When a vacancy appears in pop music, it doesn't take long to fill it. As Busted moved out of pure pop into more serious material, the way was left open for McFly to capture teenage girls' hearts with their debut album, Room on the 3rd Floor. Named after the character in the Back to the Future trilogy and sounding like an updated 2000s garage band with close harmonies and raw guitars, McFly opened their album with two number one singles, "5 Colours in Her Hair" and "Obviously," so Room on the 3rd Floor really couldn't fail—and it didn't, hitting the top on its first week of release. "That Girl," the third single released, could have sat easily on a Beach Boys album from the 1960s, or possibly even the early Beatles with the count of "one two three four" before a guitar crashes in. "Surfer Babe" (fairly predictably) and "Down by the Lake" were also Beach Boys-sounding tracks. It's not that good, however—just a fun summery mid-2000s pop album from four lads who sound as if they were enjoying themselves singing mostly about girls. "Met This Girl" also took its influences from the Rolling Stones of the 1960s with a touch of Manfred Mann's fast-paced blues. "Everybody likes to party on a Saturday night," claim the lads on the track "Saturday Night," and if you were about thirteen years old and female, this was the album of summer 2004."

== Track listing ==
Standard international edition
No.	Title	Writer(s)	Producer(s)	Length
0.	"Get Over You" (hidden track in pregap of Track 1)	Tom Fletcher; James Bourne		2:24
1.	"Five Colours in Her Hair"	Fletcher; Bourne; Danny Jones; Ben Sargeant	Craig Hardy	2:58
2.	"Obviously"	Fletcher; Bourne; Jones	Hugh Padgham, Craig Hardy	3:18
3.	"Room on the Third Floor"	Fletcher; Jones	Jason Perry	3:16
4.	"That Girl"	Fletcher; Bourne	Hugh Padgham, Craig Hardy	3:17
5.	"Hypnotised"	Fletcher; Jones; Dougie Poynter; Harry Judd		3:02
6.	"Saturday Night"	Fletcher; Jones; Poynter; Judd		2:47
7.	"Met This Girl"	Fletcher; Jones; Poynter; Judd		2:46
8.	"She Left Me"	Fletcher; Bourne		3:25
9.	"Down By the Lake"	Fletcher; Bourne		2:37
10.	"Unsaid Things"	Fletcher; Bourne; Jones; Poynter; Judd		3:25
11.	"Not Alone"	Jones		4:18
Total length:				37:42

UK special edition bonus tracks
No.	Title	Writer(s)	Length
11.	"Surfer Babe"	Fletcher; Bourne	2:33
12.	"Not Alone"	Jones	4:18
13.	"Broccoli"	Fletcher; Bourne	3:31
Total length:			43:44

Japanese bonus tracks
No.	Title	Writer(s)	Length
15.	"Five Colours in Her Hair" (music video)	Fletcher, Jones, Bourne	2:58
16.	"Obviously" (music video)	Fletcher, Jones, Bourne	3:18

B-sides and rarities
No.	Title	Length
1.	"Lola" (featuring Busted)	4:13
2.	"Saturday Nite" ("Saturday Night" demo)	2:48
3.	"The Guy Who Turned Her Down"	3:58
4.	"Get Over You" (demo)	1:44
5.	"Help!"	2:20
6.	"Obviously" (remix)	3:03
7.	"She Loves You"	2:14
8.	"That Girl" (live)	3:25
9.	"Crazy Little Thing Called Love"	2:27
10.	"Five Colours in Her Hair" (live)	3:15
11.	"Room on the Third Floor" (live)	3:37
12.	"Deck the Halls"	2:23
13.	"That Girl" (demo)	3:27
14.	"She Loves You" (live)	2:30
15.	"Obviously" (live)	3:40
16.	"Build Me Up, Buttercup" (with Busted)	3:03

== Theatre tour ==
After a minor supporting slot with Busted, the band announced their very first headline tour in 2004. They started the tour just sixteen days after the release of the album's third single, "That Girl". The tour began on 22 September 2004, and ended on 13 October, with a total of fifteen sell-out dates.

- Tour Dates
1. 22 September – Civic Hall, Wolverhampton
2. 24 September – Dome, Doncaster
3. 26 September – Royal Centre, Nottingham
4. 27 September – Clyde Auditorium, Glasgow
5. 28 September – Clyde Auditorium, Glasgow^
6. 30 September – City Hall, Newcastle
7. 1 October – Apollo, Manchester
8. 4 October – Colston Hall, Bristol
9. 5 October – Pavilions, Plymouth
10. 7 October – Newport Centre, Newport
11. 8 October – Guildhall, Portsmouth
12. 9 October – Regent, Ipswich
13. 12 October – Hammersmith Apollo, London
14. 13 October – Hammersmith Apollo, London^

^ – Extra Dates

- Setlist
1. "Saturday Night"
2. "Down by the Lake"
3. "Obviously"
4. "Surfer Babe"
5. "That Girl"
6. "Met This Girl"
7. "Not Alone"
8. "She Left Me"
9. "Hypnotised"
10. "She Loves You"
11. "Room on The Third Floor"
12. "Broccoli"
13. "Five Colours in Her Hair"

== Charts and certifications ==
=== Weekly charts ===
Chart (2004)	Peak position
European Albums Chart	9
Irish Albums (IRMA)	19
Japanese Albums (Oricon)	26
Scottish Albums (Official Charts)	2
UK Albums (Official Charts)	1

=== Year-end charts ===
Chart (2004)	Position
UK Albums (OCC)	29
Chart (2005)	Position
UK Albums (OCC)	132

=== Certifications ===
Region	Certification	Certified units/sales
United Kingdom (BPI)	2× Platinum	800,000

== Release history ==
Region	Date	Label	Format
United Kingdom	5 July 2004	Universal	CD, digital download
Ireland	5 July 2004	Universal	CD, digital download
Brazil	10 May 2007	Universal	CD, digital download
