= Above the Noise (disambiguation) =

Above the Noise is a 2010 album by McFly.

Above the Noise may also refer to:

- Above the Noise, a 2010 album by Jaime Jamgochian
- Above the Noise, a 2003 album by The Revolution Smile
- Above the Noise Tour, 2011 concert tour by McFly
- Above the Noise, a digitally-distributed ongoing video series put out by PBS Digital Studios

== See also ==
- "Shout above the Noise", a song by Breathing Space from Coming Up for Air
- Signal-to-noise ratio, of a desired signal to the level of background noise
