= Cemetery (Charlie Simpson song) =

Single by Charlie Simpson

from the album Young Pilgrim
- Released: 31 October 2011
- Recorded: 2011
- Genre: Alternative
- Label: PIAS
- Songwriter(s): Charlie Simpson

Charlie Simpson singles chronology
"Parachutes" (2011)	"Cemetery" (2011)	"Farmer & His Gun" (2012)

"Cemetery" is a single by English singer-songwriter Charlie Simpson, from his debut studio album Young Pilgrim (2011). It was released on 31 October 2011 as a digital download in the United Kingdom.

== Music video ==
A music video to accompany the release of "Cemetery" was first released on YouTube on 28 September 2011 at a length of three minutes and twenty-eight seconds. It was directed by Shane Davey. Contrary to news reports at the time, Charlie was not knocked unconscious in the making of the video. It was reported that during the sequence where the car hits the fruit stall, he was struck on the head by a pineapple, and knocked out. This was nothing more than a publicity stunt that emanated from his management team, apart from the fruit the only thing that was damaged during the making of the video was the car, which was ultimately returned to its former glory by agents engaged by the owner and the production company.

== Track listing ==
Digital download
No.	Title	Length
1.	"Cemetery" (Radio Edit)	3:29
2.	"When We Were Lions" (Acoustic)	3:42
3.	"Life is Life" (Noah and the Whale cover)	3:40
4.	"Re:Stacks" (Bon Iver cover)	6:05
5.	"Cemetery" (Acoustic)	3:22

== Chart performance ==
Chart (2011)	Peak position
UK Indie (OCC)	32

== Release history ==
Region	Date	Format	Label
United Kingdom	31 October 2011	Digital download	Charlie Simpson music
