= Long Road Home (album) =

Studio album by Charlie Simpson
- Released: 4 August 2014
- Recorded: 2013/2014 in London, England
- Genres: Acoustic, folk, indie rock, folk rock, indie folk
- Length: 41:00
- Language: English
- Label: Nusic Sounds
- Producer: Steve Osborne

Charlie Simpson chronology
| Young Pilgrim (2011) | Long Road Home (2014) | Little Hands (2016) |

Singles from Long Road Home
- 1. "Haunted" Released: 2 June 2014; 2. "Comets" Released: 2 October 2014

Long Road Home is a 2014 studio album by British singer-songwriter Charlie Simpson. It was Simpson's second top ten album in the UK.

On 2 February 2013, it was reported that Simpson had finished writing the follow-up to his 2011 solo debut Young Pilgrim and he would be heading into the studio with producer Steve Osborne (U2/Placebo) to start recording in early March.

Simpson spent the summer of 2013 playing on the Vans Warped Tour in the US, which was the first time he has played live as a solo artist in America. During October 2013, Charlie went on a tour of the UK supporting rock band, Deaf Havana. He previewed two new tracks from the forthcoming album "Winter Hymns" and "Ten More Days". In 2014, he be undertook a small run of solo shows in the UK in the lead up to the release of his 2nd solo album.

Simpson said when announcing the release: "The making of this album has been an incredible journey for me, it is probably the hardest record I have ever had to make. It took me a while to find what I was looking for and there were points when I nearly had to go back to the drawing board. However, after taking some much needed time out from writing and all things music related, I came back with a completely fresh perspective and wrote in my opinion, some of the best music I have written in my career so far. It’s an album I am hugely proud of and one I had to fight for which makes it all the more special".

Simpson later revealed that the release date for the album had been delayed until 4 August 2014.

== Singles ==
- "Winter Hymns" was the first promotional single released from the album. It was released on 29 April 2014.
- "Haunted" was the first official single premiered on 14 May 2014 on DIY.
- "Comets" is the second official single premiered on 2 October 2014.

== Reception ==
Professional ratings
Review scores
| Source | Rating |
|---|---|
| Rock Sound | 8/10 stars |
| Fortitude Magazine | 4.5/5 stars |
| The Guardian | 3/5 stars |
| The Independent | 4/5 stars |
| Sunday Times | 4/5 stars |

=== Commercial performance ===
On 6 August, Long Road Home entered the UK Albums Chart Midweeks at number four according to figures issued by The Official Charts Company. It would finally chart at number ten on the UK Albums Chart, securing Simpson's second top ten solo album, whilst also entering the UK Independent Albums chart at number one, and the Scottish Albums Chart at number thirteen.

=== Critical response ===
Rock Sound describe the album as "a more focussed effort than 11's Young Pilgrim", also stating that "In a year that he could have taken two steps back, with this album, Charlie Simpson has taken a huge step forward". Fortitude Magazine were similarly complimentary, describing it as "An album well worth the massive wait. It’s difficult to knock a credible musician at his best and that’s what you’re up against with ‘Long Road Home’."

== Track listing ==
All songs written and composed by Charlie Simpson.

| No. | Title | Length |
|---|---|---|
| 1. | "Long Road Home" | 3:13 |
| 2. | "Comets" | 3:22 |
| 3. | "Winter Hymns" | 4:03 |
| 4. | "Emily" | 4:35 |
| 5. | "Haunted" | 3:38 |
| 6. | "Would You Love Me Any Less?" | 3:37 |
| 7. | "Ten More Days" | 3:37 |
| 8. | "Blood" | 3:42 |
| 9. | "Still Young" | 3:36 |
| 10. | "Forty Thieves" | 3:44 |
| 11. | "Another Year" | 4:13 |
| Total length: | | 41:00 |

iTunes Deluxe Edition
| No. | Title | Length |
|---|---|---|
| 12. | "Wait For Me" | 4:05 |
| 13. | "Crosses" | 3:36 |
| 14. | "Track By Track Guide" (Video) | 13:25 |
| Total length: | | 62:06 |

== Chart performance ==
| Chart (2014) | Peak position |
|---|---|
| Scottish Albums (OCC) | 13 |
| UK Albums (OCC) | 10 |
| UK Download Chart (OCC) | 12 |
| UK Independent Albums (OCC) | 1 |
