= Power to Play =

Studio album by McFly
- Released: 9 June 2023
- Genre: Pop rock, hard rock
- Length: 41:13
- Label: BMG
- Producer: Danny Jones; Jason Perry

McFly chronology
Young Dumb Thrills (2020)	Power to Play (2023)

Singles from Power to Play
- 1. "Where Did All the Guitars Go?" Released: 31 March 2023; 2. "God of Rock & Roll" Released: 26 April 2023; 3. "Honey I'm Home" Released: 9 June 2023

Power to Play is the seventh studio album by English pop rock band McFly, released through BMG on 9 June 2023. The album was preceded by three singles: "Where Did All the Guitars Go?", "God of Rock & Roll", and "Honey I'm Home".

== Background and recording ==
On 29 March 2023, McFly announced the album title and release date, following a series of cryptic social media posts. Describing the record, the band added: "At the start of the process, we all got together and said what we wanted this new album to be. We all had this one thing in common, and it was guitars. We love being on tour and playing live, and we hate this weird pressure where you don't get played on the radio if you have guitars in your songs [...] Guitars, honesty, energy, all these personality traits are what give us the band's identity. We want to reach that kid with long hair, get them excited about music and make them want to pick up a guitar and jump on their bed. That's what this record is about."

== Singles ==
The album's lead single, "Where Did All the Guitars Go?" was released on 31 March 2023.

On 26 April 2023, McFly released the second single from Power to Play, "God of Rock & Roll".

On 8 June 2023, McFly appeared on The One Show and confirmed "Honey I'm Home" would be the third single from Power to Play. The official video was released on 9 June 2023.

== Critical reception ==
Ben Devlin, reviewing for MusicOMH, rated the album 3.5/5 stars. Cheri Amour for The Arts Desk called Power to Play "a defiant return to [McFly's] rock'n'roll roots".

== Track listing ==
Power to Play – Standard edition
No.	Title	Writer(s)	Length
1.	"Where Did All the Guitars Go?"	Tom Fletcher; Danny Jones; Harry Judd; Dougie Poynter; Jason Perry	4:00
2.	"Land of the Bees"	Fletcher; Jones; Judd; Poynter; Steven Battelle; Perry	4:03
3.	"Forever's Not Enough"	Fletcher; Jones; Judd; Poynter; James Bay; Perry	4:41
4.	"God of Rock & Roll"	Fletcher; Jones; Judd; Poynter; Battelle	3:31
5.	"I'm Fine"	Fletcher; Jones; Judd; Poynter; Battelle; Todd Dorigo; Perry; Rat Boy	3:48
6.	"Taking Back Tonight"	Fletcher; Jones; Judd; Poynter; Battelle	3:54
7.	"Honey I'm Home"	Fletcher; Jones; Judd; Poynter; Perry; Tom Piggot Smith^{[a]}	4:09
8.	"Route 55"	Fletcher; Jones; Judd; Poynter; Battelle; Mark Hoppus; Rat Boy	3:44
9.	"Crash"	Fletcher; Jones; Judd; Poynter; Dan Carter; Dorigo	1:41
10.	"Make It Out Alive"	Fletcher; Jones; Judd; Poynter; Battelle; Dorigo	3:17
11.	"Shine On"	Fletcher; Jones; Judd; Poynter; Battelle; Perry	4:25
Total length:			41:13

Power to Play – Deluxe edition
No.	Title	Writer(s)	Length
12.	"Broken by You" (featuring Fresno)	Fletcher; Jones; Judd; Poynter; Ross McNae; Sam McTrusty; Lucas Silveira	3:05
13.	"For the Kids"	Fletcher; Jones; Judd; Poynter; Perry	3:30
14.	"Silence Is a Scary Sound"	Fletcher; Jones; Judd; Poynter	3:31
15.	"I'm Fine" (Acoustic)	Fletcher; Jones; Judd; Poynter; Battelle; Dorigo; Perry; Rat Boy	3:43
16.	"Forever's Not Enough" (Acoustic)	Fletcher; Jones; Judd; Poynter; Bay; Perry	4:09
17.	"Forever's Not Enough" (Edit)	Fletcher; Jones; Judd; Poynter; Bay; Perry	3:36
Total length:			59:16

Notes

- ^{^[a]} signifies an arranger.

== Personnel ==
McFly

- Tom Fletcher – vocals, guitar
- Danny Jones – vocals, guitar, production
- Harry Judd – drums
- Dougie Poynter – vocals, bass guitar, guitar

Additional contributors

- Jason Perry – production (tracks 1–3, 5, 7, 11, 13, 16, 17)
- Robin Schmidt – mastering
- Chris Sheldon – mixing, engineering
- Marek Deml – engineering
- Adam Marc – synthesizer (tracks 2, 3, 17)
- Rachel Lander – cello (track 7)
- Gary Pomerol – viola (track 7)
- Magnus Johnston – violin (track 7)
- Tom Piggot Smith – violin (track 7)

== Charts ==
=== Weekly charts ===
Weekly chart performance for Power to Play
Chart (2023)	Peak position
Irish Albums (IRMA)	51
Scottish Albums (OCC)	3
UK Albums (OCC)	2
UK Independent Albums (OCC)	1

=== Year-end charts ===
Year-end chart performance for Power to Play
Chart (2023)	Position
UK Cassette Albums (OCC)	12

== Release history ==
Release formats for Power to Play
Region	Date	Format(s)	Label	Ref.
Various	9 June 2023	CD; digital download; LP; CS; streaming	BMG	
