= Above the Noise Tour =

2011 concert tour by McFly

- Tour by McFly
- Promotional tour poster
- Associated album: Above the Noise
- Start date: 18 March 2011
- End date: 29 September 2011
- Legs: 5
- No. of shows: 18 (Europe); 3 (Japan); 2 (Indonesia); 4 (Brazil); 3 (Argentina); 30 (Total)

McFly concert chronology
- Before the Noise Tour (2010); Above the Noise Tour (2011); The Keep Calm & Play Louder Tour (2012)

The Above the Noise Tour is the worldwide tour undertaken by English pop rock band McFly. The tour was played in support of their fifth studio album, Above the Noise, and their revolutionary band website, SuperCity.

== Background ==
The British leg of the tour was confirmed by band member Danny Jones on the band's ground breaking website, SuperCity. The band originally intended to complete a fourteen-date tour across the United Kingdom, but two weeks before the tour began, they were forced to rearrange the dates of the tour's first three shows, due to Dougie's stint in rehab due to depression and a drink and drug problem. The tour was originally due to begin on 12 March 2011 at the Nottingham Arenam but did not eventually start until 18 March at the Sheffield Motorpoint Arena. The band confirmed, ahead of the tour, that the setlist would contain "The highest number of songs we've ever played", and that there were some "pretty cool things set to happen". Owing to the success of SuperCity, and the band discovering a new legion of fans across the world, further dates were added for Japan and Spain. Harry later announced via his Twitter account that the band were intending to play shows in South America. The band were supported by That Sunday Feeling, City Stereo and The Struts on the UK dates of the tour. The tour marked the band's first live appearances with their new electro-esque sound. Dougie later told the Bournemouth Echo, "Some fans are not into it and played live, our new stuff sounds a lot heavier. But I think it still fits in with all of our old tracks and when the fans hear it live, they will see. My favourite track from the new album is 'Nowhere Left To Run', and I'm really looking forward to playing it live on tour."

== Critical reception ==
The tour received positive reviews from critics. Liverpool Echo gave the tour 8 out of 10 stating "McFly have managed to evolve their music and appeal to a new audience but without leaving any of their original fans behind." The Shields Gazette also gave the tour a positive review: "With a fiery and energetic performance, they kept the crowd going all night long", whilst also mentioning "It was a top show". The Chronicle Live complimented the set of the show, saying "The cavalry had well and truly arrived, while health and safety was thrown out the window as flames started to ascend from the stage and confetti was blasted from cannons" and concluding praising the boys: "With an average age of 25, the boys certainly have time on their side and as long as they can keep their problems behind them, there is no reason to suggest why McFly can’t continue to impress their adoring fans." Bournemouth Echo mentioned the experience of the tour which was "A high-octane rampage that never pauses for one second, the McFly live experience is loud, energetic and thoroughly entertaining."

== Setlist ==
1. "Party Girl"
2. "Nowhere Left to Run"
3. "If U C Kate"
4. "That's the Truth"
5. "Too Close For Comfort" (International Shows Only)
6. "Transylvania"
7. "Lies"
8. "Corrupted"
9. "Falling in Love"
10. "Obviously"
11. "All About You"
12. "I Need a Woman"
13. "End of the World"
14. "Smile"
15. "Not Alone" (International Shows Only)
16. "Star Girl"
17. "Five Colours in Her Hair"
18. "Pass Out" (British Shows Only)
19. "Walk in the Sun" / "Down Goes Another One" / "Home is Where the Heart Is" / "Unsaid Things" / "Not Alone" / "Little Joanna" (Argentinian Shows Only)
20. "The Last Song" (British Shows Only)

Encore
21. "One for the Radio"
22. "The Heart Never Lies"

Encore 2
23. Fight For Your Right (Japanese Shows Only)
24. "Shine a Light"

== Notes ==
Before the encore, both "Star Girl" and "Five Colours in Her Hair" are performed on a B-stage walkway. Both performances are extended, as during "Star Girl", the band take it in turns to play each other's instruments, and during "Five Colours in Her Hair", the band fire T-shirts into the crowd using a cannon. During "Smile", a number of giant foam balls are fired into the audience, each of which contains one of the four band member emblem's as found on the SuperCity website. During the Wembley show, the band were joined on stage by Tom Fletcher's father, who performed part of the vocals for "Smile". The Wembley show was also filmed live by a camera crew, and was streamed live to fans for a small fee. The stream was designed for fans who were unable to get tickets or could not make it to the show. SuperCity members were able to watch the concert for free. Before the concert began, fans were provided with behind the scenes footage and a Q & A interview session with the band.

== McFly on the Wall ==
Whilst the band were in the process of completing the tour, footage from on and off the stage was recorded for a fly-on-the-wall documentary series, entitled McFly on the Wall. The series, set in six parts, was set to be shown on the recently re-launched digital channel 5*, made by Channel 5. An announcement confirming the series was made on 1 April 2011. The announcement read: "Dougie, Danny, Harry and Tom are now about to go one step further with this new series, which will follow their lives in the most revealing portrait yet." Tom said of the series, "We’re all really excited to have the chance to show our fans what it's really like being in McFly! We'll have a camera crew following us everywhere, so viewers will get a real insight into what goes on behind the scenes." A trailer for the series aired on 23 April, before the official premiere date of 11 May was announced.

| # | Title | Episode notes | Original release date | Prod # |
|---|---|---|---|---|
| 1 | "Episode 1" | TBA | 11 May 2011 | TBA |
With the band set to embark on a fourteen date UK tour in support of the album Above the Noise, things go from band to worse when the first three dates of the tour are heftily rescheduled due to Dougie's stint in rehab following his split from Frankie Sandford. As such, the remaining band members set to promote their brand new single, That's the Truth, without him. They complete a series of TV performances, sign autographs up and down the country, and later celebrate Danny's birthday in true McFly style.
| 2 | "Episode 2" | TBA | 18 May 2011 | TBA |
Dougie is back, and he leaps straight back into the fray, as he returns to rehearsals following his stint in rehab. The band prepare to fly into action, but are dismayed when That's the Truth only peaks at #35. Danny's girlfriend buys him a gym membership.
| 3 | "Episode 3" | TBA | 25 May 2011 | TBA |
The band are on the road, and are set to play the first date of the tour at Sheffield's Motorpoint Arena. As the boys see the stage set for the first time, their performance for their dedicated fans seems to go down well, even with their new sound. After the show, Danny is seen playing some of his own tunes at the show's after party. The band later remix the album track "Take Me There".
| 4 | "Episode 4" | TBA | 1 June 2011 | TBA |
The band continue with their busy tour schedule, but problems arise when the tour bus breaks down on the way to an intimate mini gig in London for The Sun's Bizarre column. The band catch a taxi, and manage to arrive on time. Tom is up early for a big day, in which he plans to propose to his long term girlfriend, Giovanna Falcone. Dougie takes a break to go get Tom & 'Gio' a wedding gift, and buys an edible anus chocolate and a pair of oddly-shaped salt and pepper shakers.
| 5 | "Episode 5" | TBA | 8 June 2011 | TBA |
The band take their groundbreaking tour to Spain, where they are mobbed by a group of teen fans. After a successful run of shows, the boys go out for a meal in an underground restaurant, chill on the Costa Del Sol and meet fans, before returning to England for the final dates of the tour.
| 6 | "Episode 6" | TBA | 15 June 2011 | TBA |
The band are back in England, and they are set to play at Wembley Arena, for the final date of the tour. The show is set to be a big one, with a live audience of more than 12,000 people, each of the band members' families watching on backstage, and a camera crew filming the show live for the SuperCity audience. Tom's dad joins in the performance of "Smile", and the band talk about the future.

== Tour dates ==
| Date | City | Country | Venue |
|---|---|---|---|
Europe
| 18 March | Sheffield | England | Motorpoint Arena |
| 19 March | Manchester | England | MEN Arena |
| 20 March | Brighton | England | Brighton Centre |
| 22 March | Cardiff | Wales | Motorpoint Arena |
| 23 March | Bournemouth | England | International Centre |
| 25 March | Aberdeen | Scotland | AECC |
| 26 March | Glasgow | Scotland | SECC |
| 27 March | Newcastle | England | Metro Radio Arena |
| 29 March | Liverpool | England | Echo Arena |
| 30 March | Birmingham | England | LG Arena |
| 1 April | London | England | Wembley Arena |
| 3 April | Belfast | Northern Ireland | Odyssey Arena |
| 4 April | Dublin | Ireland | The O2 |
| 6 April | Nottingham | England | Capital FM Arena |
| 6 May | Valencia | Spain | Pabellón San Luis |
| 7 May | Madrid | Spain | Palacio Vistalegre |
| 8 May | Barcelona | Spain | Razzmatazz |
South America
| 20 May | Belo Horizonte | Brazil | Chevrolet Hall |
| 21 May | Rio de Janeiro | Brazil | HSBC Arena |
| 23 May | São Paulo | Brazil | HSBC Brasil |
| 24 May | São Paulo | Brazil | HSBC Brasil |
| 26 May | Porto Alegre | Brazil | Teatro Bourbon Country |
| 28 May | Buenos Aires | Argentina | La Trastienda Club |
| 29 May | Buenos Aires | Argentina | La Trastienda Club |
| 30 May | Buenos Aires | Argentina | Teatro Colegiales |
Asia
| 23 April | Surabaya | Indonesia | Grand City Mall |
| 24 April | Jakarta | Indonesia | Tennis Indoor Senayan |
| 26 July | Tokyo | Japan | Akasaka Blitz |
| 27 July | Tokyo | Japan | Akasaka Blitz |
| 28 July | Osaka | Japan | Big Cat |

Cancellations and rescheduled shows

| 12 March 2011 | Nottingham, England | Capital FM Arena | Rescheduled to 6 April 2011 |
| 14 March 2011 | Belfast, Northern Ireland | Odyssey Arena | Rescheduled to 3 April 2011 |
| 16 March 2011 | Dublin, Ireland | The O2 Arena | Rescheduled to 4 April 2011 |
