= Hope Is a Drug =

2025 album by Charlie Simpson

Studio album by Charlie Simpson
- Released: 22 April 2022
- Genre: Pop
- Length: 34:50
- Label: Komorebi
- Producers: Charlie Simpson; Josh Wilkinson; Martin Luke Brown; Nick Tsang; Phil Gornell

Charlie Simpson chronology
Little Hands (2016)	Hope Is a Drug (2022)

Singles from Hope Is a Drug
- 1. "I See You" Released: 22 October 2020; 2. "Blameless" Released: 29 January 2021; 3. "One of Us" Released: 16 April 2021; 4. "All the Best" Released: 18 March 2022

Hope Is a Drug is the fourth studio album by English singer-songwriter Charlie Simpson. It was released through his independent record label, Komorebi Records, on 22 April 2022. It marks his first solo album in six years since his album, Little Hands (2016), and features a sole guest appearance from Amberlake.

The album was supported by the four singles: "I See You", "Blameless", "One of Us", and "All the Best".

== Background ==
On 16 November 2021, Simpson announced the album available to pre-order alongside its promotional tour. Initially scheduled for release on 11 March, the record was pushed back. In a statement posted to his social media accounts, he explained how COVID-19 affected the manufacturing supply chains, which resulted a delayal in the physical formats being delivered to purchasers. He continued that the new album release date was set for 15 April, and the tour rescheduled to May.

== Composition ==
Simpson wanted to make it different from his previous projects, where he "explore[d] the different ranges" of his voice. He wrote most of the tracks on the piano, and intentionally avoided using the guitar.

In an exclusive interview with NME, he revealed that he began writing Hope Is a Drug in 2019, and favoured a "more stripped-back" sound. He wanted to showcase a more vulnerable side, where he explored his past relationships; something he previously never did before. He added it was his "most self-reflective record".

== Track listing ==
Hope Is a Drug track listing
No.	Title	Writer(s)	Producer(s)	Length
1.	"All the Best"	Charlie Simpson; George Morgan; James Bourne; Josh Wilkinson; Matt Willis; Nick Tsang	Simpson; Phill Gornell	3:19
2.	"Blameless"	Simpson; Wilkinson; Violet Skies	Simpson; Wilkinson; Martin Luke Brown	3:31
3.	"One of Us"	Simpson; Edd Holloway; Atkinson	Simpson; Brown	3:28
4.	"Good to Love" (featuring Amberlake)	Simpson; Morgan; Tzang	Simpson; Tzang	2:45
5.	"Twice"	Simpson; Morgan; Tsang	Simpson; Brown	3:52
6.	"I See You"	Simpson; Brown; Nick Atkinson	Simpson	3:29
7.	"Flatline"	Simpson; James Bourne; Ollie Spano	Simpson; Gornell	3:59
8.	"Anything for Love"	Simpson; David Sneddon; Josh Wilkinson; Sean Ferrujah; Steve Manovski	Simpson; Brown	3:23
9.	"Remembered Like This"	Simpson; Morgan; Tsang	Simpson; Tsang	3:29
10.	"Sliding Doors"	Simpson; Jack McManus	Simpson	3:35
Total length:				34:50

== Personnel ==
- Charlie Simpson – vocals, production
- JJ Armstrong – artwork
- Fraser Taylor – photography
- Stuart Hawkes – mastering
- Carl Bown – mixing (tracks 3, 5, 6, 8, 10)
- Charlie Holmes – mixing (tracks 4, 9)
- Phil Gornell – production, mixing (tracks 1, 7)
- Woz Clarke – mixing (track 2)
- Josh Wilkinson – production (track 2)
- Martin Luke Brown – production (tracks 2, 3, 5, 6, 8)
- Nick "Amberlake" Tsang – additional vocals (track 4), production (tracks 3, 4, 9)

== Charts ==
Chart performance for Hope Is a Drug
Chart (2025)	Peak position
Scottish Albums (Official Charts)	28
UK Download Chart (OCC)	25
UK Independent Albums (Official Charts)	10
