= Down Down Down =

Single by Charlie Simpson

from the album Young Pilgrim
- Released: 11 April 2011
- Recorded: 2011
- Genre: Acoustic, folk
- Length: 3:18:00
- Label: PIAS
- Songwriter(s): Charlie Simpson

Charlie Simpson singles chronology
"Down Down Down" (2011)	"Parachutes" (2011)

"Down Down Down" is the debut single by English singer-songwriter Charlie Simpson, from his debut studio album Young Pilgrim (2011). It was released on 11 April 2011 as a digital download in the United Kingdom. The song peaked to the number 65 on the UK Singles Chart and number 9 on the UK Indie Chart.

== Music video ==
A music video to accompany the release of "Down Down Down" was first released onto YouTube on 15 April 2011 at a total length of three minutes and twenty-three seconds. There is a storyline in the video and Charlie worked with the same people with next video for single 'Parachutes'.

== Track listing ==
Digital download No. 1 (FREE EP)
No.	Title	Length
1.	"Down Down Down (Demo)"	3:18
2.	"Thorns (Demo)"	4:16
3.	"Sundown"	3:32

Digital download No. 2
No.	Title	Length
1.	"Down Down Down"	3:20
2.	"Don't I Hold You (Wheat Cover)"	3:30

== Chart performance ==
Chart (2011)	Peak position
Scotland (OCC)	55
UK Singles(The Official Charts Company)	65
UK Indie (OCC)	9

== Release history ==
Region	Date	Format	Label
United Kingdom	11 April 2011	Digital download No. 1	Charlie Simpson music
United Kingdom	15 May 2011	Digital download No. 2	Charlie Simpson music
