= Air Guitar (song) =

Single by McBusted

from the album McBusted
- Released: 23 November 2014
- Recorded: 2014
- Genre: Pop punk
- Length: 3:19
- Label: Island
- Songwriters: Fletcher; Jones; Bourne; Robson
- Producer: Steve Robson • Jason Perry

McBusted singles chronology
"Air Guitar" (2014)	"Get Over It" (2014)

Music video
- "Air Guitar" on YouTube

"Air Guitar" is the debut single by English pop rock supergroup McBusted. It was written by Tom Fletcher, James Bourne, Matt Willis and Steve Robson, and produced by Robson and Jason Perry. The song was released on 23 November 2014 through Island Records as the lead single from the band's self-titled debut studio album, McBusted (2014).

The song's lyrics contain references to Beyoncé, Michael Jackson, Jimmy Page and Brian May. It debuted at number 12 on the UK Singles Chart.

== Background and composition ==
In November 2013, it was announced that Busted's James Bourne and Matt Willis would come together with McFly and tour together as the supergroup "McBusted". Due to enormous success, it was reported that they could release new material together. During an interview on The Jonathan Ross Show in February 2014, Willis said: "We always said that we weren't going to say we were going to bring out music, because we didn't want to say that we were going to make music and it be terrible. But we went away, we did some writing and it wasn't terrible." In April, it was announced that McBusted would be releasing an album.

On 7 October 2014, Tom Fletcher announced that McBusted would be releasing their debut single "Air Guitar" on 23 November. Additionally, it was announced that they had been signed to Island Records, after a bidding war with Sony Music. Fletcher also posted a sneak preview of the song on his Instagram page. Fletcher said that it was a unanimous decision to release it as their debut single, "When you decide first singles, opinions can be really divided — this was the first time everyone was united." Danny Jones added, "We said we wouldn't release anything unless we were all equally excited. Now we want to let the world hear it."

== Commercial performance ==
The song debuted at number 12 on the UK Singles Chart.

== Music video ==
On 8 October 2014, the official lyric video was uploaded on the band's Vevo account; the lyric video resembled the video game Guitar Hero. However, it was later removed due to the song including an unpermitted lyrical reference to Beyoncé's "Crazy in Love", which has since been replaced. The official music video was released on 6 November. The video features the band in a large room where they, along with their instruments and fans, keep reappearing and disappearing.

== Track listing ==
Digital download

1. "Air Guitar" – 3:19

CD single 1

1. "Air Guitar" (McFly Mix)
2. "Star Girl" (Live from The O2)

CD single 2

1. "Air Guitar" (Busted Mix)
2. "Air Hostess" (Live from The O2)

CD single 3

1. "Air Guitar"
2. "I See Red"
3. "You Said No" (Live from The O2)
4. "Obviously" (Live from The O2)

== Charts ==
Chart performance for "Air Guitar"
Chart (2014)	Peak position
Scotland Singles (OCC)	14
UK Singles (OCC)	12

== Release history ==
Region	Date	Format
United Kingdom	9 October 2014	Radio airplay
Ireland	21 November 2014	Digital download
United Kingdom	23 November 2014	Digital download
