= McBusted =

English rock supergroup (2013–2015)

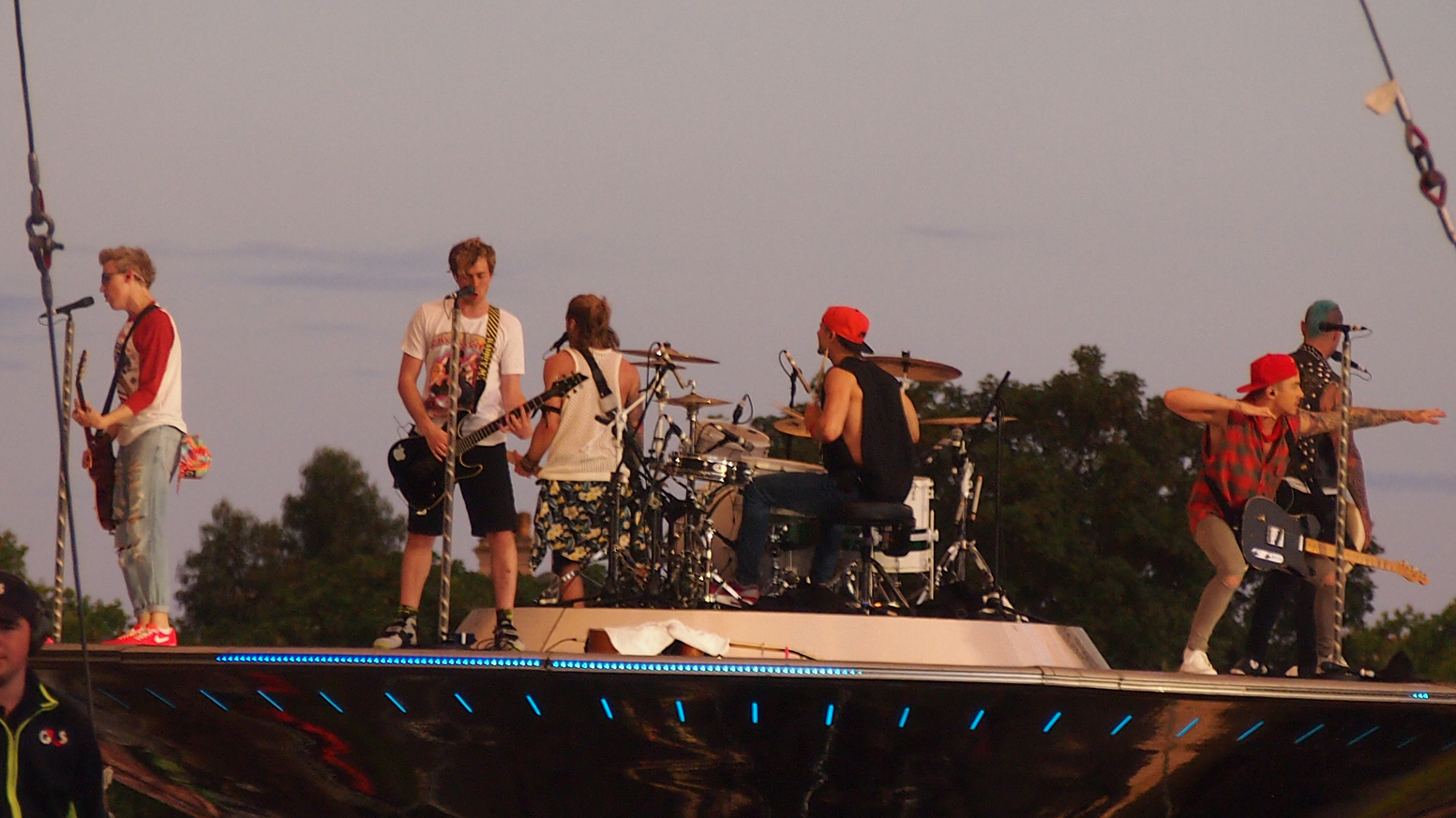
- McBusted performing in 2014

Background information
- Origin: London, England
- Genres: Pop rock; pop punk
- Years active: 2013–2015
- Labels: Island; Super; Universal
- Spinoff of: McFly; Busted
- Past members: Tom Fletcher; James Bourne; Danny Jones; Matt Willis; Dougie Poynter; Harry Judd
- Website: www.mcbusted.com (as of 6 July 2015)

McBusted were an English pop punk supergroup composed of members from bands McFly (Tom Fletcher, Danny Jones, Dougie Poynter, and Harry Judd) and Busted (James Bourne and Matt Willis). The only member of the original groups not participating in the new lineup was former Busted guitarist and vocalist Charlie Simpson. He opted to focus on his solo career and his band Fightstar.

Having previously appeared as special guests during McFly's tenth-anniversary concerts at the Royal Albert Hall, it was announced on 11 November 2013 that former Busted members Bourne and Willis would join McFly to form the six-piece supergroup "McBusted" and go on an arena tour in April and May 2014. The original eleven-concert McBusted Tour quickly sold out and was eventually extended to 34 shows, including headlining Hyde Park on 6 July 2014. On 16 June 2014, McBusted made their overseas debut, supporting One Direction on their Where We Are Tour in Denmark. They then continued to support One Direction the following night, and again in France on 21 June. They went on to also support One Direction in 2015 on the Australian and European leg of their On the Road Again Tour as special guests. In April 2014, it was revealed that McBusted would be releasing an album. On 7 October, they announced their debut single "Air Guitar", which debuted at number 12 on the UK Singles Chart. It was also announced that they had signed a record deal with Island Records. The band's self-titled debut album was released on 1 December and peaked at number nine.

On 10 November 2015, it was announced that Simpson had decided to rejoin Busted after 10 years away from the band; as a consequence Willis confirmed that McBusted had parted ways for the time being, but they "enjoyed every minute" of their time in the band. Fletcher had previously commented that although McBusted are no longer together, he will not rule out a reunion, stating it "definitely doesn't feel like the end".

== History ==
=== 2013: Background, formation and tour announcement ===
From 19 to 22 September 2013, McFly commemorated their tenth anniversary by performing four concerts at the Royal Albert Hall. During these shows, Matt Willis and James Bourne made a surprise brief reunion as Busted when they joined as special guests. (Willis and Bourne's ex-bandmate Charlie Simpson, whose decision to quit Busted led to the band's break-up in January 2005, chose not to take part.) Under the name "McBusted", the six-piece performed Busted's "Year 3000" and "Air Hostess" and McFly's "Shine a Light". This sparked rumours that Busted could make a comeback.

On 11 November 2013, it was announced that Willis and Bourne would join Tom Fletcher, Danny Jones, Dougie Poynter and Harry Judd and go on an eleven-date arena tour as McBusted in 2014, and play both Busted and McFly songs. Simpson refused to be a part of McBusted as he wanted to focus on his own career, but he was paid a "six-figure sum" by Willis and Bourne after he sold his third of the copyrighted Busted name. A source told the Daily Mirror that Simpson's decision not to be part of McBusted was an amicable one: "Charlie wishes the boys lots of luck but he wanted absolutely no involvement. All three sat down amicably and worked out a figure that everyone was happy with. Charlie made it clear in no uncertain terms that that's it for him and the boys now, it's finished." Pre-sale tickets for the eleven shows went on sale at 9am on 14 November and sold out in minutes. Tickets went on general sale the following morning and quickly sold out as well, resulting in the addition of six more concerts in Glasgow, Bournemouth, London, Birmingham, Cardiff and Manchester. Another four dates were then added on 17 November, bringing the tour to 20 dates. Since then, the tour has increased to a total 34 dates throughout April–June 2014. It comprises dates in Glasgow, Liverpool, Bournemouth, London, Newcastle, Nottingham, Leeds, Birmingham, Sheffield, Cardiff, Manchester, Brighton, Dublin and Belfast. Regarding the tour, Judd said, "It's bigger than what Busted ever were and it's bigger than what McFly ever were". On 9 December, McBusted announced that they would be headlining British Summer Time Hyde Park Festival on 6 July 2014 with the Backstreet Boys, The Vamps, Scouting for Girls and dance troupe Diversity as special guests.

On 15 November, McBusted made their first official TV performance, appearing on Children in Need 2013 and playing a medley of four songs: "All About You", "Year 3000", "Air Hostess" and "Shine a Light". A McBusted version of McFly's song "Love Is on the Radio" was released on 24 November.

=== 2014: McBusted Tour and McBusted ===
Throughout April–June 2014, McBusted went on their 34-date sold-out nationwide tour. Regarding the McBusted Tour, Judd said, "It's bigger than what Busted ever were and it's bigger than what McFly ever were". On 6 July 2014, McBusted announced that they would be headlining British Summer Time Hyde Park, with the Backstreet Boys, Five, Scouting for Girls and dance troupe Diversity as special guests. On 16 June, McBusted made their overseas debut, supporting One Direction on their Where We Are Tour in Denmark, following the cancellation of 5 Seconds of Summer. McBusted then continued as the support act the following night, and again in France on 21 June. On 10 September, it was announced that a McBusted concert film, Tourplay, would be released exclusively through Vue Cinemas on 28 October for one day.

During an interview on The Jonathan Ross Show on 22 February 2014, Willis said: "We always said that we weren't going to say we were going to bring out music, because we didn't want to say that we were going to make music and it be terrible. But we went away, we did some writing, and it wasn't terrible." On 1 April, Judd revealed that McBusted would be making an album. On 8 October, the official lyric video to their debut single "Air Guitar", was released; the song was made available to pre-order on iTunes the same day. It peaked at number 14 on the UK Singles Chart. On 23 October, the band announced that their debut album McBusted would be released on 1 December. The album debuted and peaked at number 9 on the UK Albums Chart and was certified Gold for sales of over 100,000.

=== 2015: McBusted's Most Excellent Adventure Tour, international gigs ===
On 4 November 2014, the band posted on their Twitter and Facebook pages: "It's possibly the worst kept secret in entertainment, but we are so stoked to announce the #McBusted2015Tour!!!" On 26 January 2015, on their website, they announced that the tour would be called McBusted's Most Excellent Adventure Tour. The tour lasted from 12 March to 22 April 2015, consisting of 21 shows. McBusted were also the support act for the Australian and European legs of One Direction's On the Road Again Tour in 2015. During the Australian dates, McBusted announced and performed two of their own gigs, one in Sydney and one in Melbourne. A music video was shot for their song "Get Over It" in 2014 with the intention of releasing it as a single the next year. However, James Bourne confirmed on Twitter that the release was scrapped. A DVD and Blu-ray release of the 2015 tour, McBusted's Most Excellent Adventure Tour – Live at the O2, was released on 22 June 2015 and reached number one in the music video charts.

=== Charlie Simpson's return to Busted and McBusted's future ===
The band have nothing more planned, with the members saying they will sit down and discuss what is next. However, Fletcher has suggested that McBusted would end 2016 to allow for McFly to continue. He told Fabulous magazine that "McBusted was an opportunity to have fun without knowing where it would take us, but McFly is for life. McBusted has been amazingly fun, but it's not where our passion is. McFly is more than a band; we live and breathe it. We want to make album number six."

On 10 November 2015, Charlie Simpson returned to the original Busted line up with Willis and Bourne. In their first interview with Hunger TV, Willis touched on the future of McBusted, stating, "We've done McBusted; it was awesome; we loved every second of it. Now it's time to be in this band." Although Fletcher commented that McBusted are done performing together at the minute, he also stated that it doesn't mean they won't perform together again and that "it's something that is always going to be there – it definitely doesn't feel like the end." On 26 April McFly announced their comeback tour, Anthology Tour, in which they will perform the entirety of their five studio albums in four cities over three nights.

Busted marked their 20th anniversary in 2023 with the album Greatest Hits 2.0, which features McFly on the track "Thunderbirds 2.0". This marks the first collaboration between the bands since McBusted.

== Members ==
- Tom Fletcher – vocals, guitars, keyboards
- James Bourne – vocals, guitars
- Danny Jones – vocals, guitars, harmonica
- Matt Willis – vocals, bass guitar
- Dougie Poynter – vocals, bass guitar
- Harry Judd – drums, percussion

Touring members

- Jamie Norton – keyboards (2014–2015)
- Isaac Aryee – keyboards (2014)

== Discography ==
=== Studio albums ===
Title	Details	Peak chart positions			
Title	Details	UK	AUS	IRE	SCO
McBusted	Released: 1 December 2014; Label: Island; Formats: Digital download, CD	9	48	31	9

=== Video albums ===
Title	Details	Notes
McBusted: Live at the O2 & TourPlay	Release: 24 November 2014; Formats: Blu-ray, DVD, digital download; Label: Universal	Live at the O2 directed by Matt Askem; TourPlay directed by David Spearing
McBusted's Most Excellent Adventure Tour – Live at the O2	Release: 22 June 2015; Formats: Blu-ray, DVD, digital download; Label: Universal	Directed by David Spearing

=== Singles ===
Title	Year	Peak chart positions		Album
Title	Year	UK	SCO	Album
"Air Guitar"	2014	12	14	McBusted
"Get Over It"	2015	82	—	McBusted

== Music videos ==
Title	Year	Director(s)
"Air Guitar"	2014	
"Get Over It"	2015	

== Tours ==
Headlining

- McBusted: Busted & McFly (2014)
- McBusted's Most Excellent Adventure Tour (2015)
- Fusion Festival (Sunday) (2015)

Supporting

- One Direction – Where We Are Tour (Denmark and France) (2014)
- One Direction – On the Road Again Tour (Australia and Europe) (2015)
