= Room on the 3rd Floor (song) =

2004 single by McFly

Single by McFly

from the album Room on the 3rd Floor
- B-side: "Crazy Little Thing Called Love"
- Released: 15 November 2004
- Length: 3:16
- Label: Island; Universal
- Songwriters: Danny Jones; Tom Fletcher
- Producer: Hugh Padgham

McFly singles chronology
"That Girl" (2004)	"Room on the 3rd Floor" (2004)	"All About You" / "You've Got a Friend" (2005)

"Room on the 3rd Floor" is a song by English pop rock band McFly. It was released on 15 November 2004 as the fourth and final single from their debut studio album of the same name (2004). The song debuted at number five in the UK Singles Chart and peaked at number 27 in Ireland. The song also appears as a B-side for the band's next single, "All About You" / "You've Got a Friend".

== Background ==
"Room on the 3rd Floor" was written by band members Tom Fletcher and Danny Jones. The song is less upbeat and uptempo than their previous singles. It was written during Fletcher and Jones' two-month stay at the InterContinental London (Room 363), which they found a little tedious; they began listening in to arguments in the neighbouring rooms, and wrote about a rather annoying room-service maid, all of which are mentioned on the track.

== Music video ==
The video depicts the band as small plastic models (based on Tamiya models). During the shoot, the band were painted blue ("Like a smurf"- Danny) and then digitally enhanced to make them look like plastic. McFly can be seen in full colour playing on the packaging box; the McFly Set with Roadie and Fans is a nod to their then upcoming tour.

== Track listings ==
UK CD1 and 7-inch picture disc

1. "Room on the 3rd Floor"
2. "Crazy Little Thing Called Love"

UK CD2

1. "Room on the 3rd Floor"
2. "5 Colours in Her Hair" (live)
3. "Deck the Halls"
4. "Room on the 3rd Floor" (live)
5. "Room on the 3rd Floor" (video)

UK DVD single

1. "Room on the 3rd Floor" (audio)
2. "Obviously" (video)
3. "McFly Home Movie" (Part 2)
4. "Guitar Lessons with Tom and Danny"

== Personnel ==
Personnel are adapted from the UK CD2 liner notes.

- Tom Fletcher – writing, guitar
- Danny Jones – writing, guitar
- Dougie Poynter – bass guitar
- Harry Judd – drums
- Hugh Padgham – production, mixing
- Jay Reynolds – engineering, Pro Tools
- Raj Das – assistant engineering
- Richard Woodcraft – assistant engineering
- Andy Saunders – assistant engineering

== Charts ==
Chart (2004)	Peak position
Ireland (IRMA)	27
Scotland Singles (OCC)	5
UK Singles (OCC)	5
UK Airplay (Music Week)	36
