= When We Were Lions =

EP by Charlie Simpson
- Released: 25 December 2010
- Recorded: 2010
- Genre: Folk, indie rock
- Length: 17:21

Charlie Simpson chronology
When We Were Lions (2010)	Young Pilgrim (2011)

Professional ratings
Review scores
Source	Rating
Indieoriented	(very positive)
Sputnikmusic.com	4.0/5 stars
Jake Harrison	(positive)
Melodic.net	4.0/5 stars
Manxieash	(very positive)

When We Were Lions is the debut EP by Charlie Simpson, confirmed to be followed by his first solo full-length debut album in 2011. In the live shows promoting Young Pilgrim he played 2 songs live from the EP which were "If I Hide Will You Come Looking?" and "Farmer & His Gun", which is also a bonus track and a live bonus track on the iTunes bonus tracks. During his Young Pilgrim World Tour he plays "When We Were Lions" and "Farmer & His Gun" as the encore. Simpson announced in January that he is releasing a video for the track "Bullet" from the EP. Despite being released 3 years prior, the single is just a one off.

== Track listing ==
No.	Title	Length
1.	"When We Were Lions"	3:43
2.	"If I Hide, Will You Come Looking?"	2:34
3.	"The Farmer & His Gun"	3:52
4.	"Bullet"	3:29
5.	"Lost"	3:41
