= Parachutes (song) =

Single by Charlie Simpson

from the album Young Pilgrim
- Released: 5 August 2011
- Recorded: 2011
- Genre: Alternative
- Label: PIAS
- Songwriter: Charlie Simpson

Charlie Simpson singles chronology
"Down Down Down" (2011)	"Parachutes" (2011)	"Cemetery" (2011)

"Parachutes" is a single by English singer-songwriter Charlie Simpson, from his debut studio album Young Pilgrim (2011). It was released on 5 August 2011 as a digital download in the United Kingdom. The song peaked to number 44 on the UK Singles Chart, his highest-charting single to date.

== Background ==
In an interview with Digital Spy he was asked to describe the song, he said:

"It's one of the more instrument-heavy songs on the record – I wanted to strike a balance between the acoustic nature and more upbeat instruments. It's also the first track I've ever written with a piano, so it's a good contrast to other songs on the album."

== Music video ==
A music video to accompany the release of "Parachutes" was first released on YouTube on 8 June 2011 at a length of three minutes and thirty-four seconds.

== Live performances ==
Charlie Simpson performed the song Live on OK! TV. Simpson performed the song in the Live Lounge live from Boardmasters in Newquay for Fearne Cotton and BBC Radio 1. He also performed the song live at Xfm in Manchester.

== Critical reception ==
Lewis Corner of Digital Spy gave the song a positive review stating:

"It's a far cry from his tween-pop days of drooling over high school teachers and perky air hostesses – instead focusing on his newfound independence. Something tells us the 'Year 3000' reunion tour is long way off yet.

== Track listing ==
Digital download
No.	Title	Length
1.	"Parachutes"	3:34
2.	"Skin and Bones"	3:36
3.	"Dead Man Walking"	3:23
4.	"Parachutes" (Unplugged)	3:41
5.	"Parachutes" (Live from the Tabernacle)	3:43

== Chart performance ==
Chart (2011)	Peak position
Scotland Singles (OCC)	39
UK Singles (OCC)	44
UK Indie (OCC)	5

== Release history ==
Region	Date	Format	Label
United Kingdom	5 August 2011	Digital download	Charlie Simpson music
