= Young Pilgrim =

Studio album by Charlie Simpson
- Released: 15 August 2011
- Recorded: 2010 in London, England
- Genres: Acoustic, folk, indie rock
- Length: 44:59
- Language: English
- Label: PIAS
- Producer: Danton Supple

Charlie Simpson chronology
When We Were Lions (2010)	Young Pilgrim (2011)	Long Road Home (2014)

Singles from Young Pilgrim
- 1. "Down Down Down" Released: 11 April 2011; 2. "Parachutes" Released: 7 August 2011; 3. "Cemetery" Released: 31 October 2011; 4. "Farmer & His Gun" Released: March 2012

Young Pilgrim is the debut studio album by British singer-songwriter Charlie Simpson. The album was produced by Danton Supple (Doves, Coldplay) and was released on 15 August 2011 through independent label PIAS Recordings.

Following the extended hiatus announced by Fightstar in 2010, Simpson began writing solo material in conjunction with fan funding website Pledge Music. The platform was launched in 2009, as an innovative new way of involving fans in the record making process. Fans "pledge" to receive a copy of the completed project (an album or EP), while also having the chance to purchase exclusive extras such as private gigs, music video appearances, or even providing backing vocals during recording.

Simpson first issued new material on Christmas Day 2010, releasing a "pledgers only" EP entitled When We Were Lions. The EP and subsequent singles, garnered praise from music critics, seeing "Down Down Down" selected as "Record of the Week" by BBC Radio 1 presenter Fearne Cotton. Simpson has described his solo work as "something completely different", while it has been noted the album contains elements of melancholy, similar to the works of The National, Bon Iver, and Jackson Browne.

Young Pilgrim's physical release was put under strain after all 30,000 copies of the album were destroyed in an arson fire at the warehouse and distribution center for PIAS Entertainment Group during the 2011 London Riots on 8 August 2011. However, it was confirmed the following day that despite the damages, the album would still be released as planned on 15 August. The release proved a success for Simpson and the independent label, entering the UK Albums Chart at number six.

== Singles ==
- "Down Down Down" was the first single released from the album. It was released on 11 April 2011. The song peaked at number 65 on the UK Singles Chart. It was selected as "Record of the Week" by BBC Radio 1.
- "Parachutes" is the second single released from the album. It was released on 7 August 2011. Simpson worked with the same directors for this video as he did with "Down Down Down".
- "Cemetery" is the third single from Young Pilgrim. It was a free download of the week on iTunes and later that week Charlie announced that it would be the follow-up to Parachutes. He announced via social networking site Twitter. "Very much looking forward to a few days off, before coming back to shoot the video for Cemetery..! :)". It was revealed on 28 September 2011 that it would be released on 31 October 2011 and would include 4 b-sides.
- "Farmer & His Gun" is to be the 4th and final single from Young Pilgrim. The news was broke when Charlie tweeted Harry Styles of One Direction that the track would be a single. The song also featured on Charlie's EP 'When We Were Lions' before being promoted from a bonus track from Young Pilgrim to an album track. On 16 January, Charlie Simpson revealed the video for Farmer & His Gun will be fully animated. He announced this on his Twitter.

== Reception ==
=== Commercial performance ===
According to the Midweeks issued by the Official Charts Company and published by BBC Radio 1 on 17 August, Young Pilgrim was projected to debut on the UK Albums Chart at number five. It was reported by Music Week that at the time of the midweek data, the album had sold some 4,663 copies with 55% of the sales being physical copies. The album eventually debuted at number six on the UK Albums Chart, whilst also entering the UK Independent Albums chart at number three, and the Scottish Albums Chart at number seven. The albums commercial success marked the first chart hit for the Pledge Music programme. Craig Jennings, CEO of Simpson's management group, stated, "We are delighted to achieve a top ten album with 'Young Pilgrim', and it would not have been possible without PledgeMusic putting together such a great direct-to-fan plan to launch the project. This is an example of the PledgeMusic model working perfectly."

=== Critical response ===
Professional ratings
Review scores
Source	Rating
AbsolutePunk	95%
BBC Music	(favorable)
The Daily Telegraph	3/5 stars
Digital Spy	4/5 stars
The Guardian	3/5 stars
Melodic.net	4.5/5 stars
NME	5/10
Rock Sound	8/10
Sunday Mercury	(favorable)
Yorkshire Post	(favorable)
Under The Gun Review	7/10

Young Pilgrim has received generally favorable reviews, albeit some mixed from music critics. Broden Terry of AbsolutePunk awarded the album a score of 95% and noted, "Young Pilgrim is undoubtedly the finest accomplished of Charlie Simpson's music career to date. This twelve-track effort sees Simpson once again overhaul his sound into a beautiful blend of folk, acoustic and pop, while also implementing rich harmonies, absorbing melodies, thoughtfully constructed lyrics, and the clarity of luscious instrumentation to wonderful effect." BBC Music critic Fraser McAlpine gave a favorable review and reported that Simpson is "clearly a gifted singer and songwriter. There’s a lot of walking streets alone, blisters cracking over skin, melancholy trips to childhood haunts, and a lot of soul-searching: classic singer-songwriter fare. Thankfully, our hero has two important things on his side: a robust way with a tune and a swag-bag rammed with glorious multi-tracked harmonies." James Lachno of British broadsheet The Daily Telegraph gave a more mixed review. While awarding the album three stars out of five, he opined, "Simpson’s husky voice and warm melodies show promise, but his bitterwsweet, pastoral romanticism – all "old oak trees" and "morning snow" – is clichéd." Similarly, Dave Simpson of The Guardian also awarded three stars out of five, writing, "His first offering in this guise is solid rather than spectacular, his Eddie Vedder croon occasionally let down by a lyrical clunker. He sounds much more convincing on "Parachutes" and "All at Once", melancholy Lemonheads-y pop full of regret for broken relationships." In contrast, Lewis Corner of Digital Spy awarded Young Pilgrim four stars out of five and explained, "Simpson showcases his singer-songwriter sensibilities best on tracks "Riverbanks" and "All at Once" - the former a breezy anthem that climaxes with a crescendo of guitars and strings that wouldn't sound out of place at a Snow Patrol gig, while the latter is a barnyard knees-up of pacey folk beats and brash guitar strums." Tom Spinelli of Melodic.net also gave highly favorable feedback. Awarding four-and-a-half stars out of five, he noted that, "Simpson takes the folk rock route drifting away from his previous bands and most recent rock outfit Fightstar. Whether it’s his band or his solo material, this man is a force in the music industry. I have stood by this statement and will stand by this as time goes on. Everyone needs to check out this album and support this talented artist." Sunday Mercury critic Paul Cole was impressed with the album, writing that, "Simpson has delivered a subtle set of songs. Musically, there’s more than a little Coldplay in here; a dash of David Gray; a new baritone vocal that nods to The National's Matt Berninger. Highlights include "Hold On" – an Imogen Heap-style experiment with multi-tracked vocals – and finalé "Riverbanks", a crescendo of guitar, piano and strings. Paid for by the fans through the Pledge programme, this is worth making a pilgrimage for."

Roy Gardener of the Yorkshire Post reported that, "His first solo-record sees the 26-year-old acting his age with a pleasant dose of acoustic-pop. Eschewing his small-town Suffolk roots for an affected, Americanised bellow, moments of petty angst are balanced with a playful country bounce. Producer Danton Supple offers emotive, indie-flick arrangements and aching arpeggios into the mix." Rock Sound writer Andy Ritchie was also impressed with Young Pilgrim. Awarding the album eight out of ten, he noted that "Young Pilgrim is a hauntingly beautiful affair, that paints Simpson as a jack of all trades; a songwriter capable of tugging your heartstrings and not just a frontman. The highlights come where Charlie’s voice is at its softest, as in "Parachutes" and "Thorns", but overall, this a solid, refreshing and somewhat unexpected output from Simpson." Writing for webzine This Is Fake DIY, Heather McDaid awarded the album seven out of ten and opined, "What he, in turn, created is a 12 track album that flaunts his versatility as an artist, exploring a new style that he hadn’t dabbled in before through his official releases. As acoustic albums go, he has captured that easy listening quality alongside his raw vocals and certified himself a successful solo artist." Less receptive reviews came from MusicOMH writer William Grant, who awarded the album 2 ½ stars out of five and critiqued "Leaving Simpson alone to his songwriting devices, a box of inherited vinyl and a comedown does not a nu-folk star make." While Scottish publication The Fly awarded the album two stars out of five with Harriet Gibsone stating, "Young Pilgrim will be a hit with anyone who’s ever brought an acoustic along to a festival, but, sadly, it’s not for us."

== Track listing ==
All songs written and composed by Charlie Simpson.

No.	Title	Length
1.	"Down Down Down"	3:18
2.	"Parachutes"	3:34
3.	"All at Once"	3:15
4.	"Thorns"	4:16
5.	"Cemetery"	3:33
6.	"Hold On"	3:52
7.	"I Need A Friend Tonight"	3:38
8.	"Suburbs"	3:19
9.	"Sundown"	3:32
10.	"Farmer & His Gun"	3:54
11.	"If I Lose It"	4:18
12.	"Riverbanks"	4:24
Total length:		44:59

Deluxe Edition
No.	Title	Length
1.	"Live at the Tabernacle DVD."	50:00+
2.	"Famer & His Gun"	4:02

iTunes Deluxe Edition
No.	Title	Length
13.	"Please Let Me Go"	3:47
14.	"Farmer and His Gun" (Live from the Tabernacle)	5:59
15.	"Track By Track Guide" (Video)	14:31
Total length:		1:08:36

== Personnel ==
The following personnel contributed to Young Pilgrim:

Musicians

- Charlie Simpson — lead vocals, backing vocals, acoustic guitar, electric guitar, bass, piano, keyboard, programming, lyrics
- Reuben Humphries — drums, percussion
- Audrey Riley — string arrangement, cello
- Leo Payne — violin
- Greg Warren — violin
- Sue Dench — viola
- Jonny Bridgewood — double bass
- Nick Etwell — trumpet
- Nick Foot — harmonica
- Adam Chetwood — pedal steal guitar

Production

- Danton Supple — producer, mixing (tracks 1–8, 11–12)
- Guy Massey — producer, mixing (tracks 9–10)
- Manon Granjean — engineering
- Ian Dowling — engineering
- Jon Davis — mastering
- Horsie in the Hedge — art direction, design
- Jon Bergman — photography

== Chart performance ==
Chart (2011)	Peak position
Scottish Albums (OCC)	7
UK Albums (OCC)	6
UK Download Chart (OCC)	5
UK Independent Albums (OCC)	3

== Release history ==
Region	Date	Label	Format	Catalogue #	Ref.
United Kingdom	15 August 2011	PIAS Recordings	CD, digital download,	SICCD002	
United States	23 August 2011	PIAS Recordings	CD, digital download,	SICCD002	
