= That Girl (McFly song) =

2004 single by McFly

- CD1 single

Single by McFly

from the album Room on the 3rd Floor
- B-side: "She Loves You"
- Released: 6 September 2004
- Length: 3:17
- Label: Island
- Songwriters: Tom Fletcher; James Bourne
- Producer: Hugh Padgham

McFly singles chronology
"Obviously" (2004)	"That Girl" (2004)	"Room on the 3rd Floor" (2004)

"That Girl" is a song by English pop rock band McFly. It was written by frontman Tom Fletcher and Busted's James Bourne. The song was released on 6 September 2004 as the lead single from the band's debut studio album Room on the 3rd Floor (2004). It was their first single not to reach the top spot in the UK Singles Chart, peaking at number three. In Ireland, it reached number 14.

== Background ==
The song was written by McFly frontman Tom Fletcher and James Bourne of Busted. It is a fun and upbeat track and was the third single lifted from McFly's debut album Room on the 3rd Floor, but the first to be released after the album.

The lyrics tells a story of how someone felt that they couldn't get that girl, ended up with 'That Girl' but soon found 'That Girl' cheating on him and eventually breaking up with them. Bass lyrics are accompanied with backing lyrics that changed gradually due to the outcomes of the actions of 'That Girl'. The CD features their second Beatles cover track, "She Loves You". It also features previous tracks performed live. It is the first single by them to feature on a DVD single which features footage of performances "She Loves You" at the Olympic Torch Ceremony and also some home footage.

== Music video ==
The music video shows the band working at a service/petrol station. They begin by being rather bored, as the probable lack of customers. 'That Girl' arrives and starts flirting with Danny as he fixes her car. As she leaves, she gives him her phone number. She arrives "three days later" and is seen with another man. Tom, Dougie and Harry cause havoc - Harry overfills the car, Dougie takes parts out of the car that are actually needed for it to work, and Tom destroys his credit card by swiping it repeatedly really fast. At the end of the video, the boys run away seeing as the car crashed after Dougie 'helped' with 'fixing' it.

The video won Best Video at the 2004 Smash Hits Awards.

== Track listings ==
UK CD1 and 7-inch picture disc

1. "That Girl"
2. "She Loves You"

UK CD2

1. "That Girl"
2. "Obviously" (live)
3. "She Loves You" (live)
4. "That Girl" (live)
5. "That Girl" (video)
6. "Spider-Man 2 Premiere Footage" (Part 1)

UK DVD single

1. "That Girl" (audio)
2. "She Loves You" (live from the Olympic Torch Ceremony)
3. "McFly Home Movie – The Life of McFly"
4. "Spider-Man 2 Premiere Footage" (Part 2)

== Charts ==
=== Weekly charts ===
Chart (2004)	Peak position
Europe (Eurochart Hot 100)	10
Ireland (IRMA)	13
Scottish Singles Sales (Official Charts)	2
UK Singles (Official Charts)	3
UK Airplay (Music Week)	42

=== Year-end charts ===
Chart (2004)	Position
UK Singles (OCC)	84
