= That's the Truth (McFly song) =

- CD1 single

Single by McFly

from the album Above the Noise
- Released: 7 March 2011
- Recorded: 2010
- Genre: R&B, pop rock
- Length: 3:52
- Label: Island/Super, Universal
- Songwriter(s): Dallas Austin, Tom Fletcher, Danny Jones, Dougie Poynter, Harry Judd
- Producer(s): Dallas Austin, Jason Perry, Adam Noble, McFly

McFly singles chronology
"Shine a Light" (2010)	"That's the Truth" (2011)	"Love Is Easy" (2012)

"That's the Truth" is the third single from McFly's fifth studio album, Above the Noise. The single was first confirmed by band members Tom Fletcher and Dougie Poynter in a web chat on the group's official website, SuperCity. Graham Norton premiered the song on British radio on 15 January 2011, on his drivetime slot on BBC Radio 2. The single was released on 7 March 2011.

== Lack of promotion ==
McFly released the single on 7 March as a physical and downloadable track, however with Dougie Poynter entering rehab for depression and drug and alcohol abuse, the band conducted little promotion for the song. "That's the Truth" peaked at No. 35 in the UK.

== Critical reception ==
Robert Copsey from Digital Spy awarded it 4 stars and said that: "Thankfully, there's no need for us to be knocking down the doors at Sats HQ, for the track itself offers a full and feasible explanation. "I haven't been messing around / I wouldn't ever go out / And do the things that you don't want me to do," the lads insist here, while producers Dallas Austin and Jason Perry push the buttons marked "anthemic", "pop-rock" and "boyband ballad". It's nothing we haven't heard before, but when the pieces are put together this well, it's all pretty impossible to resist – the track that is". The Entertainment-Focus review, said that: "Across the record the band takes in R&B/pop lite on That's The Truth". Jack Foley from Indie Rock thought that:"That’s The Truth is another of the album’s cheesier moments, when the pop tendencies once again take over in a Take That kind of way, but the chorus is suitably emphatic and satisfying". Glasswerk described the song as "a departure from the electronic sound and sublime synths featured on previous singles 'Shine A Light' and 'Party Girl'. A string orchestra accompanies the band's heartfelt lyrics about honesty and working through problems in relationships, whilst the anthemic chorus has already proved to be a huge fan's favourite at McFly's recent live shows."

== Music video ==
On 14 January 2011, the band broadcast the recording of the video live throughout the day via their website, Super City. A trailer for the video was streamed on 21 January, before the full video was released on 25 January. Dougie is seen smashing up his room, crying in the corner and feeling generally upset. However, drips of water from the ceiling seem to heal Dougie, and when he wakes up the following morning, everything has gone back to normal. The video has peaked at No. 32 in the UK TV Airplay Chart. The music video is directed by Luke Bellis, and art directed by Will Field www.willfield.tv production design

== Live performance ==
The first live performance of "That's the Truth" was broadcast on 11 February 2011, as part of the fifth episode of ITV variety show Comedy Rocks with Jason Manford. A celebrity edition of The Cube, featuring Fletcher and Jones as contestants, also features a live performance of That's the Truth. The episode is set to air on 5 June. BBC Yorkshire streamed an exclusive acoustic version of That's the Truth on 27 January. McFly performed That's the Truth twice without Dougie Poynter as he was in rehab for depression and alcohol and drug problems. Consequently, Tom Fletcher played Bass while McFly performed on Daybreak & Comic Relief: Let's dance.

== Track listing ==
The track listing was confirmed on 14 February 2011, when the single was made available to pre-order through Townsend Records. The artwork was also revealed on this date.

UK CD1

1. "That's the Truth"
2. "Shine a Light" (Live)

UK CD2

1. "That's the Truth"
2. "I'll Be Your Man" (Live)
3. "I Need a Woman" (Live)
4. "Nowhere Left to Run" (Danny Jones Remix)

UK 7" Picture Disc

1. "That's the Truth"
2. "That's the Truth" (7th Heaven Club Mix) (Edit)

iTunes EP

1. "That's the Truth"
2. "Shine a Light" (Live)
3. "That's the Truth" (7th Heaven Club Mix)
4. "I'll Be Your Man" (Live)

BBC Yorkshire Digital Exclusive

1. "That's the Truth" (Acoustic Version)

== Chart performance ==
On 20 February 2011, the single debuted on the UK Singles Chart at number 161. Upon the official release on 7 March 2011, it jumped a massive 126 places to number Thirty-five the following week.

== Charts ==
Chart (2011)	Peak position
Scotland (OCC)	38
UK Singles (OCC)	35

== Release history ==
Region	Date	Label	Format
Ireland	4 March 2011	Island Records	CD single, Digital download
United Kingdom	7 March 2011	Island Records	CD single, Digital download
