= Charlie Simpson =

British musician (born 1985)

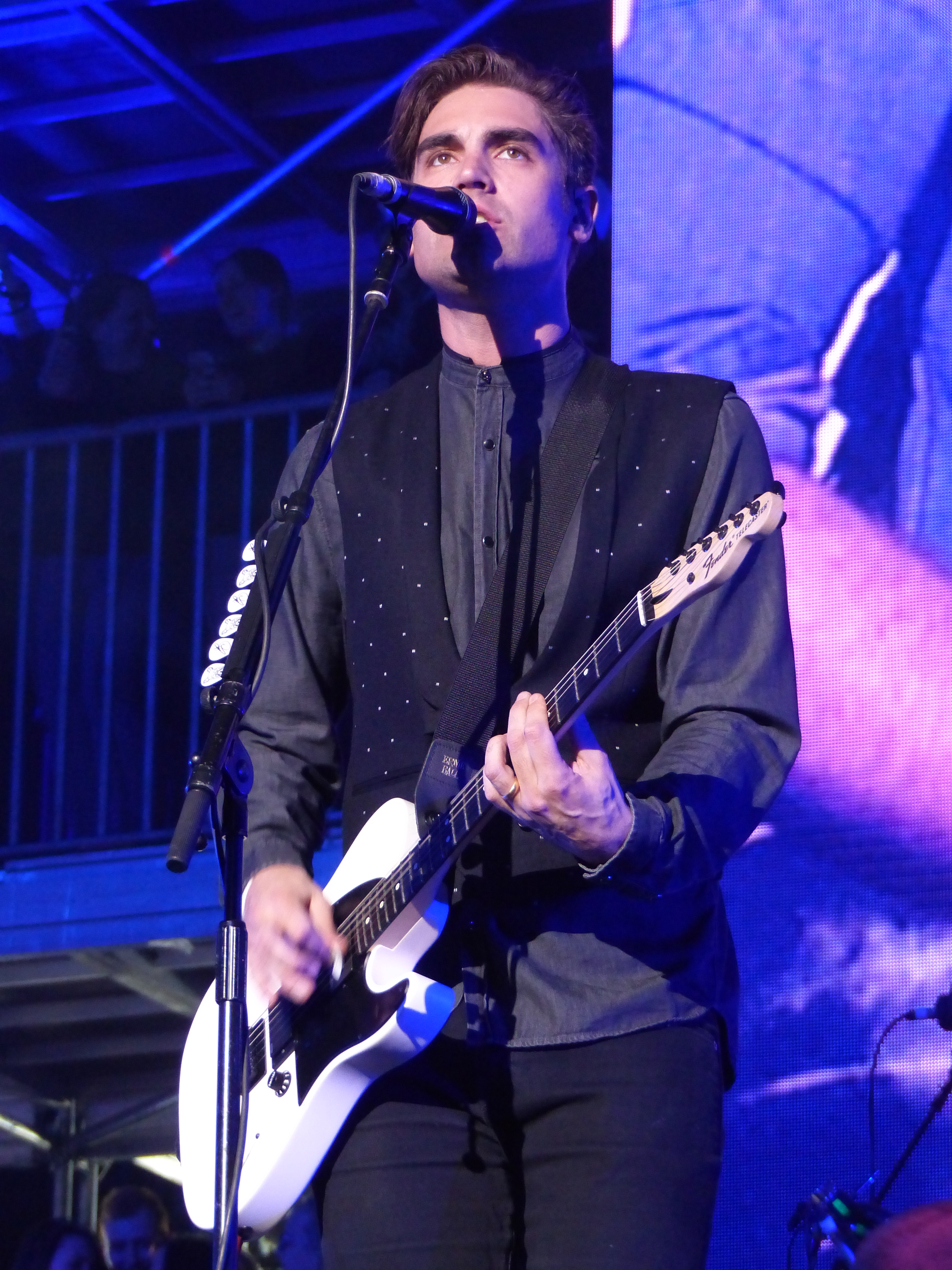
- Simpson performing in 2016

Background information
- Born: Charles Robert Simpson; 7 June 1985 (age 41); Woodbridge, Suffolk, England
- Genres: Pop-punk; pop rock; synth-pop; post-hardcore; alternative rock; emo; alternative metal
- Occupations: Singer; songwriter; musician
- Instruments: Vocals; guitar; drums; piano; keyboards; harmonica; bass guitar
- Years active: 2001–present
- Member of: Fightstar; Busted
- Formerly of: Once Upon a Dead Man

Charles Robert Simpson (born 7 June 1985) is an English singer, songwriter, and musician from Suffolk. He is a member of the pop-punk band Busted and the post-hardcore band Fightstar. AllMusic has noted that Simpson is "perhaps the only pop star to make the convincing transition from fresh-faced boy bander to authentic hard rock frontman". Simpson is a multi-instrumentalist, playing guitar, bass, keyboards, drums and the harmonica.

Simpson has achieved eleven UK Albums Chart top 40 releases across his musical career – six of which entered the UK top 10. He has also had four UK number-one singles with Busted, as well as two top-20 singles with Fightstar and two UK top-10 solo albums. Between Busted, Fightstar and his solo projects, he has sold over five million records worldwide, winning two Brit Awards, a Rock Sound Award and being nominated for two Kerrang! Awards.

== Early life and family ==
The youngest of three boys, Simpson was born in Woodbridge, Suffolk. He has two brothers, Will (born 1980) and Edd (born 1981). Will is the vocalist and guitarist in Brigade, and Edd is the lead singer and guitarist in an alternative band called Union Sound Set. Simpson's musical maternal heritage dates back to Sir William Sterndale Bennett, who was a notable 19th century English pianist, conductor, and composer.

Simpson was educated at Framlingham College Prep School in Suffolk and then at Uppingham School, where his great-grandfather, Robert Sterndale Bennett (1880–1963), had been a Director of Music between 1908 and 1945.

== Career ==
=== Busted (2002–2005; 2015–present) ===
Simpson first gained fame with pop rock/pop punk act Busted as a result of responding to an advertisement placed by Matt Willis and James Bourne in NME magazine in 2001. Busted consisted of Simpson on lead guitar and occasionally drums, Willis on bass guitar and Bourne on rhythm guitar and piano; all three members provided vocals. Over a period of two years, the trio had major success and sold over 5 million records, won two BRIT Awards, and also won The Record of the Year in 2004.

Simpson left Busted in 2005 to concentrate on post-hardcore band Fightstar.

On 10 November 2015 Busted announced they would be reforming with Simpson back in the original line-up and would embark on an 18 date arena tour around the UK and Ireland. The band sold 100,000 tickets in the first hour of the tour going on sale. Busted's third studio album Night Driver was released in November 2016. In 2018, Busted announced their fourth album Half Way There, along with arena tour dates in March 2019.

After another four year hiatus, whilst the band focused on other projects, in May 2023 Busted announced they would be returning for a 20 Year Anniversary Greatest Hits tour, which went on to become the biggest selling UK arena tour of 2023. They also released a Greatest Hits album which went to number 1 in the UK album charts.

=== Fightstar (2003–present) ===
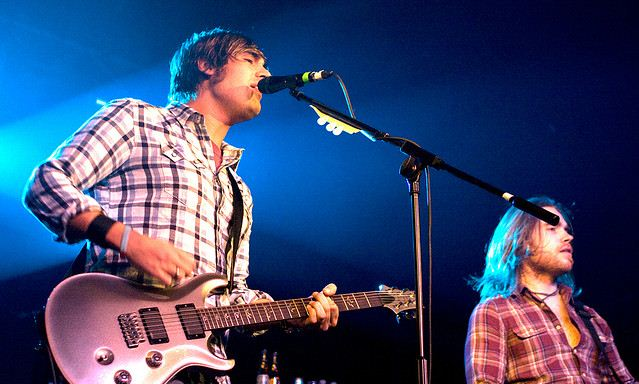
Simpson performing with Fightstar in 2010

Despite the huge success of Busted, Simpson began to grow increasingly discontented with the pop star lifestyle and the music he was performing. As an avid fan of rock music, he felt unfulfilled by the commercial pop songs of Busted.

He met Alex Westaway in late 2003, forming what became Fightstar shortly afterwards. For over a year he would lead a secret "double life": by night he would attend rehearsal sessions with his new band after completing obligated media work and concert performances with Busted. During 2004, he and Westaway wrote Fightstar's debut EP, They Liked You Better When You Were Dead. The EP showcased a heavier post-hardcore influenced sound that differed greatly to Busted's material. The EP was recorded during November with Mark Williams in London. During this time, speculation began to grow about Busted's future. He announced he was leaving Busted to pursue his career full-time with Fightstar in January 2005.

Simpson then funded and put together a compilation album called The Suffolk Explosion, which was released through his own label Sandwich Leg Records. It showcased a number of unsigned bands from Charlie's home county of Suffolk, including Brigade and Prego, as well as a solo acoustic track written by him called "Carry Her".

Fightstar went on to record their debut full-length studio album with rock producer Colin Richardson. Grand Unification was released on 13 March 2006, and further proved the initial cynics wrong by receiving widespread positive reviews. In particular, Paul Brannigan of Kerrang! magazine stated the album was "one of the best British rock albums of the past decade". Scottish music publication The Fly also lauded the album as "one of the 21st Century's ultimate rock debuts". Shortly afterwards, the band went on to receive nominations at the Kerrang! Awards for "Best British Newcomer" and "Best British Band". After leaving Island Records due to a disagreement over the band's artistic direction, the band signed to an independent label called Institute Records which was a division of Gut Records to release their second album. One Day Son, This Will All Be Yours (2007), peaked at No. 27 on the UK Album Chart, before releasing a B-sides compilation album titled Alternate Endings (2008). The four-piece then funded and co-produced their third album, Be Human (2009). Fightstar released their fourth full-length album Behind The Devils Back (2015), which would be their most critically acclaimed album, making Rock Sound magazine's Top 50 Albums list for 2015.

On 6 November 2023, Fightstar announced they would be returning for a headline show at Wembley Arena to mark the band's twenty year anniversary.

=== Solo career (2010–present) ===
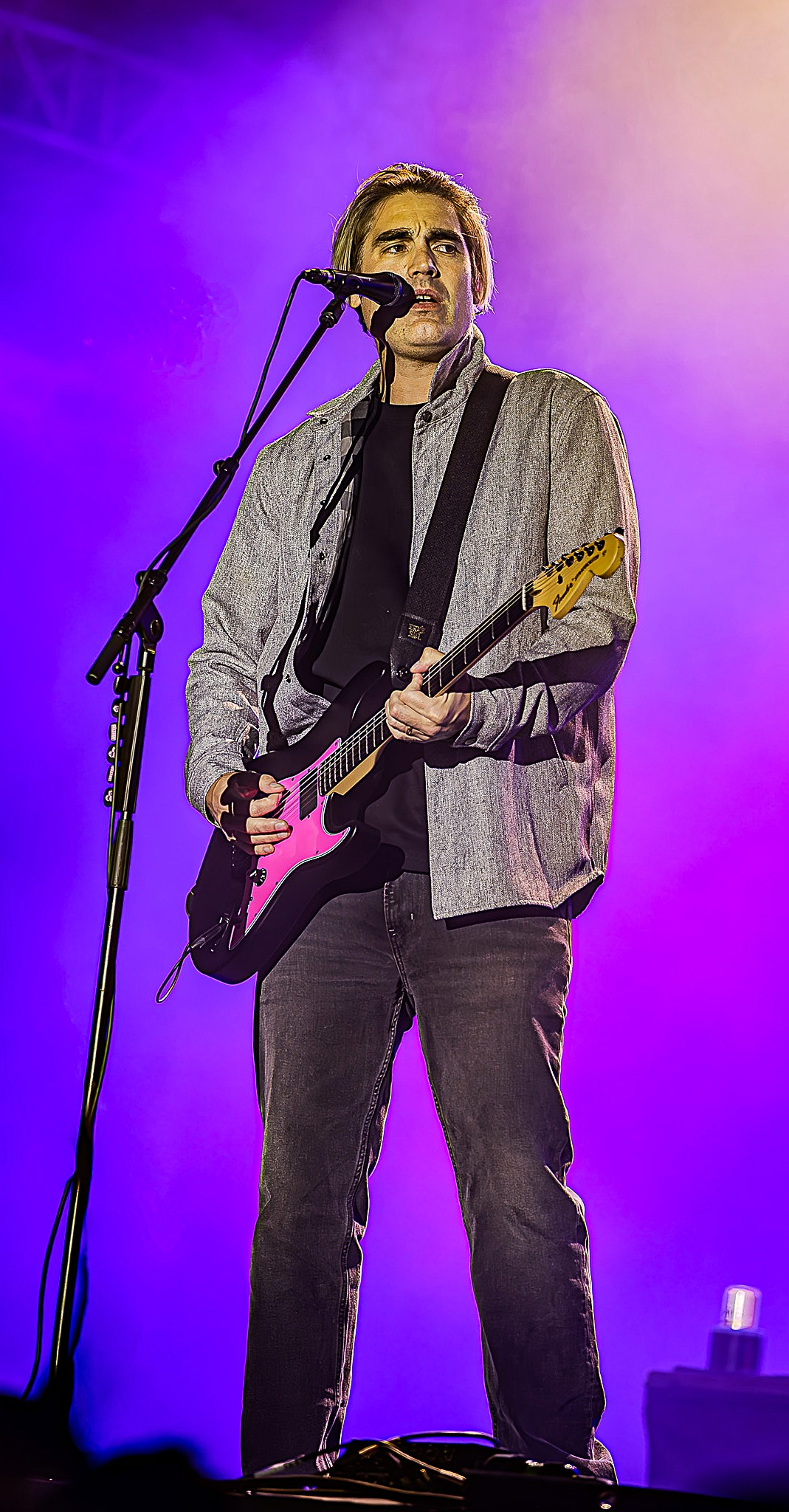
Simpson performing at Car Festival 2025

On 29 July 2009, he made a Myspace page for his acoustic solo work. There were three songs on the page, "Dead Man Walking", "Empty Guns (Demo)", and "Carry Her". "Carry Her" was previously available on The Suffolk Explosion.

Fightstar announced a hiatus at the beginning of 2010, stating that they were "taking some time off" for the remainder of 2010–11 to work on separate projects before regrouping in 2012 to begin working a new record. Simpson has started working on a solo acoustic album, while Westaway and Haigh will be completing post-production on the bands film and working on some music videos.

Simpson went into the studio in June 2010 to start recording his full-length debut album with producer Danton Supple, whose previous work includes Coldplay and The Cure. The album was funded through PledgeMusic and as one of the main incentives for the campaign, fans received an EP called When We Were Lions on Christmas Day 2010. The full-length album was finally finished in February 2011 and was mastered by John Davis at Metropolis Studios in London. The first single to be taken from the album was called "Down Down Down" and it had its first radio airplay on 11 April, as Radio 1 DJ Fearne Cotton's Record of the Week. The single was officially released on 16 May, though it was made available to buy on iTunes straight away. The album, titled Young Pilgrim was released on 15 August 2011. It went straight into the UK album chart at number 6, having been at number 5 in the midweeks. Simpson signed to PIAS Records in Germany and the album was released in Europe in August 2012.

On 2 February 2013, it was reported that Simpson had finished writing the follow-up to his 2011 solo debut 'Young Pilgrim' and he would be heading into the studio with producer Steve Osbourne (U2/Placebo) to start recording in early March.

Simpson spent the summer of 2013 playing on the Vans Warped Tour in the US, which was the first time he has played live as a solo artist in America. During October 2013, Charlie went on a tour of the UK supporting rock band, Deaf Havana. He previewed two new tracks from the forthcoming album "Winter Hymns" and "Ten More Days". In 2014, he undertook a small run of solo shows in the UK in the lead up to the release of his second solo album.

Simpson announced on 28 April 2014 that his second solo album is to be called Long Road Home and will be released later that year, since revealing the release date would be 4 August 2014.

In October 2014, Simpson announced that he would play a 13 date UK solo acoustic tour in January/February of the following year.

On 5 May 2016, Simpson released his third solo album, Little Hands, a compilation of rare tracks from 2010 though 2016. The first single was a stripped-down version of "Emily". The album also included the track from the Watch UKTV series Singing In the Rainforest, "Walking With the San", which first aired in 2015. The song was recorded as part of the show in which Charlie travelled to Namibia to spend time living and playing music with the San people. After the show aired, an edit was made to act as a music video for the song and was uploaded to Facebook, the track has since gone viral and has been viewed over 14,000,000 times.

On 23 October 2020, Simpson released the first track from his upcoming album I See You, which peaked at 39 on the iTunes chart in its first week. In late 2021, Simpson announced his upcoming fourth studio album Hope Is a Drug, scheduled for release in March 2022. He also revealed the dates of the accompanying promotional tour. The tour was later postponed, citing delays to album supply chains and shipping caused by the COVID-19 pandemic.

=== Other works ===
In 2016, Simpson released an EP with a side project called Once Upon a Dead Man alongside his two brothers Will and Edd Simpson, and friend Simon Britcliff. Once Upon a Dead Man had been in the works since at least 2012, when the three Simpson brothers performed together to cover Bon Iver. In 2016, after Fightstar has completed touring in support of their album Behind the Devil's Back and ahead of Busted's reunion tour, the band released their first single "The Canopy" and announced a 1 April digital release of their debut EP, Concepts and Phenomena. In March they released their second single, "Give Up", before streaming the whole EP on 31 March. On 2 April, they released a music video for the song "Threads".

Outside of his main musical activities, Simpson also has frequently collaborated with other musicians, which include This Is Menace, Gunship (the side project of his Fightstar bandmates, Alex Westaway and Dan Haigh), alternative rock band Two Year Break, as well as indie band, The Travis Waltons. With Gunship, he co-wrote and lent his voice for their highly critical acclaimed single, "Tech Noir", of Gunship's debut album. In 2018, he contributed to Bullet for My Valentine's sixth album Gravity, receiving a songwriting credit on the track "Breathe Underwater". He also co-wrote the song Can't Escape The Waves on Bullet For My Valentine's 2022 self titled album.

Charlie has also been involved in film scoring, stating in an interview that this was something he was keen to pursue later in his career. He wrote the score for an independent British film 'Everyone's Going To Die', which debuted at the SXSW Film Festival in March 2013.

In 2023, Simpson won the fourth series of The Masked Singer as "Rhino", making him the first male winner in the UK. After his victory, he released the EP Kifaru containing songs he performed on The Masked Singer.

In 2023, Simpson appeared on Gunship's third album "Unicorn", lending his voice to "Tech Noir 2", the sequel to "Tech Noir" from the first album. with film director John Carpenter and Tim Cappello from Tina Turner (1939–2023) and the film The Lost Boys (1987) on Saxophone. In 2024, Simpson was cast as The Sung Thoughts of the Journalist in The Spirit of Man tour of Jeff Wayne's Musical Version of The War of the Worlds.

In 2025, multiple publications speculated that Simpson was the person behind the anonymous metal band President, playing the titular role of the band's frontman The President. For their part, The President confirmed in an interview with Rock Sound that their true identity is "not ever going to be acknowledged."

== Personal life ==
Simpson married his long-time girlfriend Anna Barnard in June 2014, following the announcement of their engagement the week earlier. During a show on his 2015 UK Tour at London's Islington Assembly Hall, Simpson announced that he and his wife were expecting their first child together. On 21 July that year, Simpson's wife gave birth to their first son, Arlo Simpson. In February 2018, their second son, Jago, was born.

Simpson is an association football fan and supports Premier League club Ipswich Town.

In 2004, Simpson was quoted in Tatler magazine as saying he supported the Conservative Party, stating that he'd "grown up with their views" and "way of doing things". According to The Guardian, Simpson "was pilloried just like Phil Collins and Geri Halliwell before him". He later denied a political allegiance to the Conservatives, saying, "The Tory thing is complete bullshit! It came out of Matt's mouth in an interview taking the complete piss, and it was on the front cover of a newspaper. He was like laughing when he said it. Matt's Labour! He said something like, 'Now I've got loads of money I'm a fucking Tory boy,' laughing."

== Discography ==
=== Studio albums ===
Title	Details	Peak chart positions		
Title	Details	UK	UK Indie	SCO
Young Pilgrim	Released: 15 August 2011; Label: PIAS Recordings; Format: Digital download, CD	6	3	7
Long Road Home	Released: 4 August 2014; Label: Nusic Sounds / ADA Warner; Format: Digital download, CD	10	1	13
Little Hands	Released: 6 May 2016; Label: NUA Entertainment; Format: Digital download, CD	—	—	—
Hope Is a Drug	Released: 22 April 2022; Label: Komorebi Records; Format: Digital download, CD	—	10	28
"—" denotes a recording that did not chart or was not released.

=== Extended plays ===
Title	Details
When We Were Lions	Released: 25 December 2010; Label: Independent; Format: CD
Kifaru	Released: 20 February 2023; Label: Independent; Format: Digital

=== Singles ===
As lead artist

Title	Year	Chart positions			Album
Title	Year	UK	UK Indie	SCO	Album
"Down Down Down"	2011	65	9	58	Young Pilgrim
"Parachutes"	2011	44	5	39	Young Pilgrim
"Cemetery"	2011	—	32	—	Young Pilgrim
"Farmer & His Gun"	2012	—	—	—	Young Pilgrim
"Haunted"	2014	—	—	—	Long Road Home
"Comets"	2014	—	—	—	Long Road Home
"Walking with the San" (featuring San Bushmen tribe)	2015	—	—	—	Little Hands
"I See You"	2020	—	—	—	Hope Is a Drug
"Blameless"	2021	—	—	—	Hope Is a Drug
"One of Us"	2021	—	—	—	Hope Is a Drug
"All the Best"	2022	—	—	—	Hope Is a Drug
"—" denotes a recording that did not chart or was not released.

As a featured artist

Title	Year	Album
"Do They Know It's Christmas?" (As part of Band Aid 20 with Busted)	2004	Non-album single
"Avenue of Heroes" (This Is Menace featuring Charlie Simpson)	2007	The Scene Is Dead
"Souvenir from Italy" (Cry for Silence featuring Charlie Simpson)	2008	The Glorious Dead
"Separation Season" (The Travis Waltons featuring Charlie Simpson)	2015	Separation Season
"Tech Noir" (Gunship featuring Charlie Simpson)	2015	Gunship
"Tech Noir 2" (Gunship featuring John Carpenter, Tim Cappello, Charlie Simpson)	2023	Unicorn
