= Shine a Light (McFly song) =

2010 single by McFly

- CD2 cover

Single by McFly featuring Taio Cruz

from the album Above the Noise
- Released: 7 November 2010
- Recorded: 2009
- Genre: Synth-pop; pop; pop rock
- Length: 3:38 (radio edit featuring Cruz); 3:55 (solo version)
- Label: Island
- Songwriters: Tom Fletcher; Danny Jones; Taio Cruz
- Producers: Taio Cruz; Alan Nglish

McFly singles chronology
"Party Girl" (2010)	"Shine a Light" (2010)	"That's the Truth" (2011)

Taio Cruz singles chronology
"Second Chance" (2010)	"Shine a Light" (2010)	"Higher" (2010)

Music video
- "Shine a Light" on YouTube

"Shine a Light" is the second single from English band McFly's fifth studio album, Above the Noise. The single features vocals from singer Taio Cruz. The single was released on 7 November 2010 via digital download, with a physical release following the next day. A free download was available for members of the band's new website, SuperCity. The song received mostly positive reviews from pop music critics. On 3 November 2010, the song was added to BBC Radio 1's A-List. The song peaked at number 9 on the UK Airplay Chart. McFly secured their fifteenth Top 5 hit with "Shine a Light" on the UK Singles Chart.

== Writing process ==
The single was first confirmed by band frontman Tom Fletcher, before being made available to pre-order on the HMV website. Fletcher described the writing process as "working backwards" in comparison to how the band usually writes their songs. They started out with the beat and then built the song around it.

== Critical reception ==
Robert Copsey from Digital Spy awarded it 4 stars and said: "'Shine a Light' might be a sentimental number about missing an ex, but with Cruz's squelchy synths, McFly's trademark pop/rock choonage and some deceptively catchy "Eh Eh"s, the urge to bound around the nearest open space for three minutes and 45 seconds is near-irresistible." Iain Moffatt from BBC Music said that: "even the perfectly serviceable of-the-moment pop of Shine a Light are little preparation for the delights in store here".

The Entertainment Focus review said that: "Across the record the band takes anthemic pop on the corking Shine a Light". Johnny Dee from Virgin Media said: "Better is the Auto-Tune soul of "Shine a Light" which sees the band teaming up with Taio Cruz to good effect." Jack Foley from Indie London said that: "Shine a Light showing what can be achieved when they fuse pop rock with dance-pop and combine vocals with Taio Cruz (arguably the best offering either of these two acts have had in the charts for some time!)".

== Music video ==
The song premiered on 21 September 2010, following a video treasure hunt competition involving the band. The treasure hunt allowed fans to appear in the music video for the track by hunting for clues to get to the place of filming. It premiered on the group's website on 9 October, appearing on their YouTube page just hours later. The video was directed by Phil Griffin. It features McFly and Cruz performing together in a cage, whilst hordes of fans watch them from outside.

== Live performances ==
McFly performed "Shine a Light" live for the first time on Paul O'Grady Live, without an appearance from Cruz.

On 4 December, McFly and Cruz performed the song together live on Jingle Bell Ball; the first and unique time they had done so.

McFly performed the song on The Hollyoaks Music Show, The Alan Titchmarsh Show, TMI and the charity events ChildLine Concert in Dublin and Children in Need.

McFly also performed an acoustic version of the song in Spain on El Hormiguero.

During the 2020 COVID-19 lockdowns, Tom Fletcher, Danny Jones with James Arthur, Olly Murs and Niall Horan did a virtual performance of the song.

== Track listing ==
UK CD1

1. "Shine a Light" (featuring Taio Cruz) - 3:39
2. "Shine a Light" (featuring Taio Cruz) (WestFunk & Steve Smart Remix) - 3:28

UK CD2

1. "Shine a Light" (McFly Solo Version) - 3:55
2. "Dynamite" (Radio 1 Live Lounge Session) - 3:56
3. "I'll Be Your Man" (Acoustic Version) - 4:59
4. "End of the World" (Acoustic Version) - 3:38

UK 7" Picture Disc

1. "Shine a Light" (featuring Taio Cruz) - 3:39

== Chart performance ==
On 14 November, the single debuted on the UK Singles Chart at number 4, with sales of more than 51,000 copies, the song spent seven weeks in the Top 20, In its 7th week, "Shine a Light" became the top selling singles of McFly after "All About You" and spent eighteen weeks in UK top 100. The song peaked the number 9 in UK Airplay Chart. As of 2012, it has sold 341,000 copies in the UK.

In Scotland the song spent three weeks on Top 10 and eight weeks in the Top 20. In Portugal the song spent seven weeks on Top 20. Nine weeks after the original release, "Shine a Light" featured 16 in 4Music's top 20 for the week.

== Charts ==
=== Weekly charts ===
Chart (2010–11)	Peak position
Belgium (Ultratip Bubbling Under Flanders)	10
European Hot 100	20
Ireland (IRMA)	13
Scottish Singles Sales (Official Charts)	4
UK Singles (Official Charts)	4
UK Airplay (Music Week)	9

=== Year-end charts ===
Chart (2010)	Position
UK Singles Chart	98

== Certifications ==
Region	Certification	Certified units/sales
United Kingdom (BPI)	Platinum	600,000^{‡}
^{‡} Sales+streaming figures based on certification alone.

== Personnel ==
- Danny Jones - songwriter, guitar, lead vocals, backing vocals
- Tom Fletcher - songwriter, guitar, lead vocals, backing vocals
- Harry Judd - drums, percussion
- Dougie Poynter - bass
- Taio Cruz - songwriter, lead vocals, synths, keyboard, producer
- Alan Nglish - producer
- Serban Ghenea - mixer

== Release history ==
Region	Date	Label	Format
Ireland	5 November 2010	Island Records	Digital download, CD
United Kingdom	7 November 2010	Island Records	CD, digital download, 7"
