= Obviously (song) =

2004 single by McFly

- One of artwork variants

Single by McFly

from the album Room on the 3rd Floor
- B-side: "Get Over You"
- Released: 21 June 2004
- Genre: Pop rock; acoustic rock
- Length: 3:18
- Label: Island
- Songwriters: James Bourne; Tom Fletcher; Danny Jones
- Producer: Hugh Padgham

McFly singles chronology
"5 Colours in Her Hair" (2004)	"Obviously" (2004)	"That Girl" (2004)

Music video
- "Obviously" on YouTube

"Obviously" is a song by English pop rock band McFly. It was released as the second single from their debut studio album, Room on the 3rd Floor. The single itself features a cover version of Beatles single, "Help!", as well as the band's first recorded interview—part one of which can be found on CD2, with part two appearing on a limited edition 7-inch picture disc. The single was the band's second number-one single on the UK Singles Chart, where it stayed for one week. It also reached number 14 in Ireland.

== Lyrics ==
The song is about the lead singer having a crush on a girl he knows is completely "out of [his] league". He really wants that girl, but he knows that he "never will be good enough for her". Even though he had given up and desperately wanted to ignore the fact, it was impossible to get rid of it.

Tom Fletcher wrote the song about his ex-girlfriend, Giovanna Falcone, whom he had recently broken up with. Falcone had since started dating a police officer and Fletcher did not know if he would ever get back with her (Fletcher and Falcone would eventually marry in 2012). For the lyrics, the policeman's job was changed to Marines to make him, in Fletcher's own words, "sound harder".

== Music video ==
The video features the boys as caddies in a golf game which features the characters mentioned in the song. The band members eventually have fun around the golf course on the buggies. Shots also involve them being in a hall where they play their instruments.

== Track listings ==
UK CD1
No.	Title	Length
1.	"Obviously"
2.	"Get Over You"

UK CD2
No.	Title	Length
1.	"Obviously"
2.	"Help!"
3.	"Obviously" (mix)
4.	"Interview (Part 1)"
5.	"Obviously" (video)

UK 7-inch picture disc
No.	Title	Length
1.	"Obviously"
2.	"Interview (Part 2)"

== Charts ==
=== Weekly charts ===
Chart (2004)	Peak position
Europe (Eurochart Hot 100)	7
Ireland (IRMA)	14
Scottish Singles Sales (Official Charts)	1
UK Singles (Official Charts)	1
UK Airplay (Music Week)	26

=== Year-end charts ===
Chart (2004)	Position
UK Singles (OCC)	42

== Certifications ==
Region	Certification	Certified units/sales
United Kingdom (BPI)	Platinum	600,000^{‡}
^{‡} Sales+streaming figures based on certification alone.

== Other performances ==
The Derren Brown stage show Enigma (2009–10) concluded with a video of McFly performing a version of the song. The new lyrics included Brown's prediction of the order in which randomly chosen members of the audience would shuffle a number of pictures.
