= List of songs recorded by McFly =

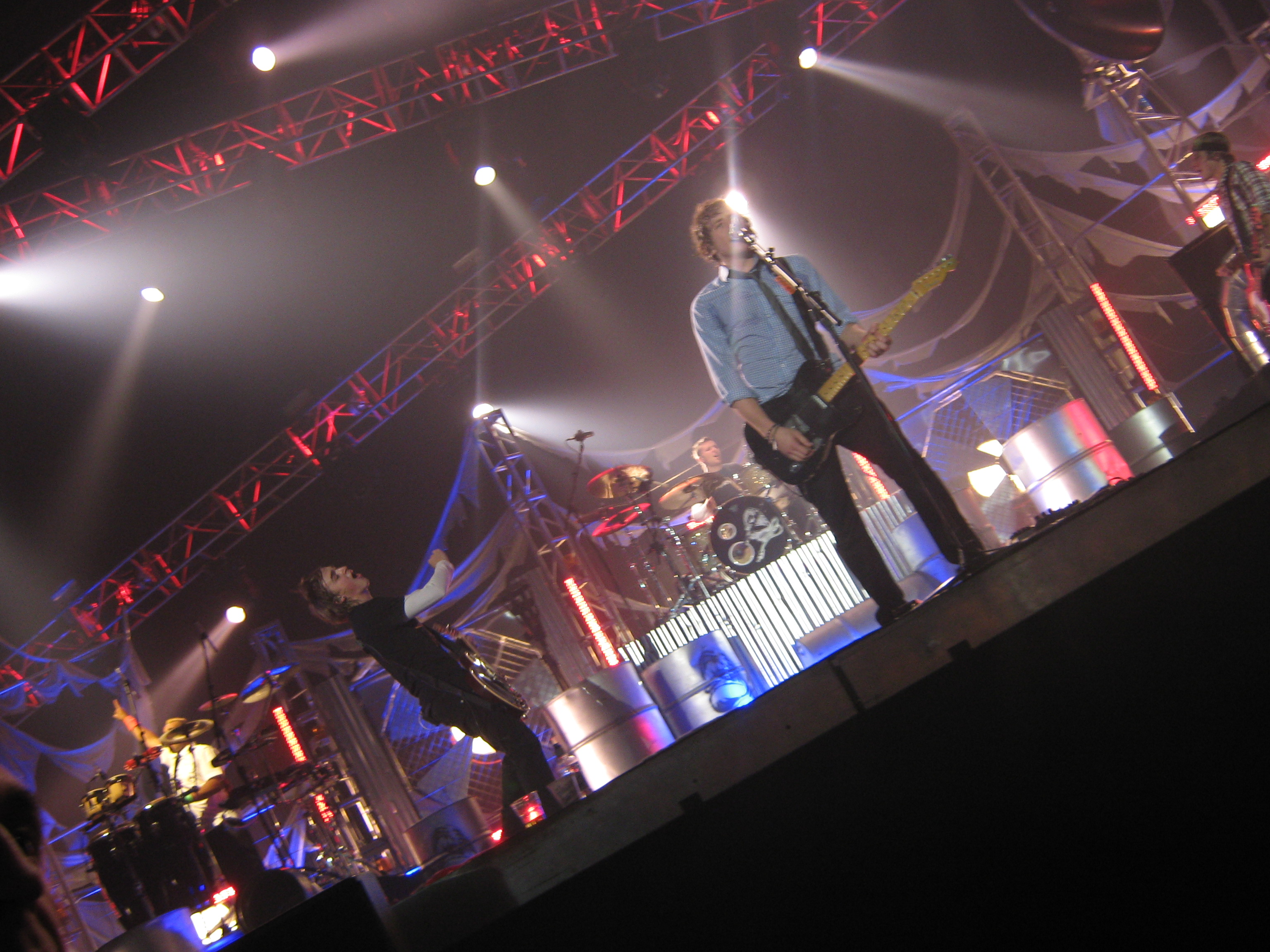
McFly, Radio:ACTIVE tour, Newcastle Metro Radio Arena, 8/11/08

This is a list of all songs performed by the British band McFly.

== Originals ==
| Title | Album | Year |
|---|---|---|
| "5 Colours In Her Hair" | Room on the 3rd Floor | 2004 |
| "All About You" | Wonderland | 2005 |
| "Another Song About Love" | Young Dumb Thrills | 2020 |
| "The Ballad Of Paul K" | Wonderland | 2005 |
| "Break Me" | The Lost Songs | 2019 |
| "Broccoli" | Room on the 3rd Floor | 2004 |
| "Broken By You" | Power to Play (deluxe) | 2023 |
| "Bubblewrap" | Motion in the Ocean | 2006 |
| "Cherry Cola" | Memory Lane: The Best of McFly | 2012 |
| "Corrupted" | Radio:Active | 2008 |
| "Corner of My Mind" | The Lost Songs | 2019 |
| "Crash" | Power to Play | 2023 |
| "Dare You to Move" | The Lost Songs | 2019 |
| "Do Whatcha" | Memory Lane: The Best of McFly | 2012 |
| "Do Ya" | Radio:Active | 2008 |
| "Don't Know Why" | Wonderland | 2005 |
| "Don't Wake Me Up" | All the Greatest Hits | 2007 |
| "Down By The Lake" | Room on the 3rd Floor | 2004 |
| "Down Down" | Memory Lane: The Best of McFly | 2012 |
| "Down Goes Another One" | Radio:Active | 2008 |
| "Dragonball" | N/A | 2021 |
| "Easy Way Out" | Wonderland (Japanese edition) | 2005 |
| "The End" | Radio:Active | 2008 |
| "End of the World" | Above the Noise | 2010 |
| "Everybody Knows" | Radio:Active | 2008 |
| "Falling In Love" | Radio:Active | 2008 |
| "Foolish" | Above the Noise | 2010 |
| "Forever's Not Enough" | Power to Play | 2023 |
| "For the Kids" | Power to Play (deluxe) | 2023 |
| "Friday Night" | Motion in the Ocean | 2006 |
| "Get Over You" | Room on the 3rd Floor | 2004 |
| "God of Rock & Roll" | Power to Play | 2023 |
| "Going Through The Motions" | Radio:Active | 2008 |
| "Growing Up" (featuring Mark Hoppus) | Young Dumb Thrills | 2020 |
| "The Guy Who Turned Her Down" | 5 Colours in Her Hair CD2 | 2004 |
| "Happiness" | Young Dumb Thrills | 2020 |
| "Head Up" | Young Dumb Thrills | 2020 |
| "The Heart Never Lies" | All the Greatest Hits | 2007 |
| "Home Is Where The Heart Is" | Motion in the Ocean | 2006 |
| "Honey, I'm Home" | Power to Play | 2023 |
| "Hotel on a Hill" | Party Girl CD2 | 2010 |
| "Hyperion" | The Lost Songs | 2019 |
| "Hypnotised" | Room on the 3rd Floor | 2004 |
| "I'll Be OK" | Wonderland | 2005 |
| "I'll Be Your Man" | Above the Noise | 2010 |
| "I'm Fine" | Power to Play | 2023 |
| "I've Got You" | Wonderland | 2005 |
| "I Need a Woman" | Above the Noise | 2010 |
| "I Wanna Hold You" | Wonderland | 2005 |
| "iF U C Kate" | Above the Noise | 2010 |
| "Ignorance" | The Heart Never Lies CD2 | 2007 |
| "Josephine" | The Lost Songs | 2019 |
| "Just My Luck" | Just My Luck | 2006 |
| "Land of the Bees" | Power to Play | 2023 |
| "The Last Song" | Radio:Active | 2008 |
| "Lies" | Radio:Active | 2008 |
| "Like I Can" | Young Dumb Thrills | 2020 |
| "Little Joanna" | Motion in the Ocean | 2006 |
| "Lonely" | Motion in the Ocean | 2006 |
| "Love Is Easy" | Memory Lane: The Best of McFly | 2012 |
| "Love Is On The Radio" | Non-album single | 2013 |
| "Lucky Ones" | The Lost Songs | 2019 |
| "Mad About You" | Young Dumb Thrills | 2020 |
| "Make it Out Alive" | Power to Play | 2023 |
| "Man on Fire" | The Lost Songs | 2019 |
| "Memory Lane" | Wonderland | 2005 |
| "Met This Girl" | Room on the 3rd Floor | 2004 |
| "No Worries" | I'll Be OK CD1 | 2005 |
| "Not Alone" | Room on the 3rd Floor | 2004 |
| "Not the End" | Young Dumb Thrills | 2020 |
| "Nothing" | Wonderland | 2005 |
| "Nowhere Left to Run" | Above the Noise | 2010 |
| "Obviously" | Room on the 3rd Floor | 2004 |
| "One For The Radio" | Radio:Active | 2008 |
| "Only The Strong Survive" | Radio:Active | 2008 |
| "Party Girl" | Above the Noise | 2010 |
| "Please, Please" | Motion in the Ocean | 2006 |
| "POV" | Radio:Active | 2008 |
| "Pretty Girls" | The Lost Songs | 2019 |
| "Red" | The Lost Songs | 2019 |
| "Room On The 3rd Floor" | Room on the 3rd Floor | 2004 |
| "Route 55" | Power to Play | 2023 |
| "Saturday Night" | Room on the 3rd Floor | 2004 |
| "She Falls Asleep Part 1" | Wonderland | 2005 |
| "She Falls Asleep Part 2" | Wonderland | 2005 |
| "She Left Me" | Room on the 3rd Floor | 2004 |
| "Shine a Light" | Above the Noise | 2010 |
| "Shine On" | Power to Play | 2023 |
| "Silence Is A Scary Sound" | Motion in the Ocean | 2006 |
| "Sink or Sing" | Young Dumb Thrills | 2020 |
| "Smile" | Radio:Active | 2008 |
| "Sofa, Hyundai, Administration" | The Heart Never Lies CD2 | 2007 |
| "Something About You" | The Lost Songs | 2019 |
| "Sorry's Not Good Enough" | Motion in the Ocean | 2006 |
| "Star Girl" | Motion in the Ocean | 2006 |
| "Surfer Babe" | Room on the 3rd Floor | 2004 |
| "Sunny Side of the Street" | Party Girl CD1 | 2010 |
| "Take Me There" | Above the Noise | 2010 |
| "Taking Back Tonight" | Power to Play | 2023 |
| "That's the Truth" | Above the Noise | 2010 |
| "That Girl" | Room on the 3rd Floor | 2004 |
| "This Song" | Above the Noise | 2010 |
| "Those Were the Days" | The Lost Songs | 2019 |
| "Tonight is the Night" | Young Dumb Thrills | 2020 |
| "Too Close For Comfort" | Wonderland | 2005 |
| "Touch The Rain" | The Lost Songs | 2019 |
| "Transylvania" | Motion in the Ocean | 2006 |
| "Ultraviolet" | Wonderland | 2005 |
| "Unsaid Things" | Room on the 3rd Floor | 2004 |
| "Walk In The Sun" | Motion in the Ocean | 2006 |
| "We Are The Young" | Motion in the Ocean | 2006 |
| "We Were Only Kids" | The Lost Songs | 2019 |
| "Where Did All the Guitars Go?" | Power to Play | 2023 |
| "Wild and Young" | Young Dumb Thrills | 2020 |
| "You're Not Special" | Young Dumb Thrills | 2020 |
| "Young Dumb Thrills" (featuring Rat Boy) | Young Dumb Thrills | 2020 |

== Covers ==
| Title | Original Artist | Album | Year |
|---|---|---|---|
| "Baby's Coming Back" | Jellyfish | All the Greatest Hits | 2007 |
| "Black or White" | Michael Jackson | Radio:ACTIVE Live at Wembley | 2009 |
| "Build Me Up Buttercup" (with Busted) | The Foundations | Crashed The Wedding CD1 | 2003 |
| "Crazy Little Thing Called Love" | Queen | Room On The 3rd Floor CD1 | 2004 |
| "Deck The Halls" | Traditional | Room On The 3rd Floor CD2 | 2004 |
| "Don't Stop Me Now" | Queen | Motion in the Ocean | 2006 |
| "Dynamite" | Taio Cruz | Radio 1's Live Lounge – Volume 5 | 2010 |
| "Fight For Your Right" | Beastie Boys | The Greatest Bits: B-Sides & Rarities | 2007 |
| "Help!" | The Beatles | Obviously CD2 | 2004 |
| "I Kissed A Girl" | Katy Perry | Do Ya/Stay with Me | 2008 |
| "I Predict A Riot" | Kaiser Chiefs | Ultraviolet/The Ballad of Paul K CD2 | 2005 |
| "Lola" (with Busted) | The Kinks | 5 Colours in Her Hair CD1 | 2004 |
| "Mr Brightside" | The Killers | I Wanna Hold You CD1 | 2005 |
| "My Generation" (with Roger Daltrey) | The Who | Download only | 2005 |
| "Pinball Wizard" | The Who | I'll Be OK CD2 | 2005 |
| "Rockin' Robin" | Bobby Day | Sorry's Not Good Enough/Friday Night | 2006 |
| "Santa Claus Is Coming To Town" | J. Fred Coots and Haven Gillespie | The Greatest Bits: B-Sides & Rarities | 2007 |
| "She Loves You" | The Beatles | That Girl CD1 | 2004 |
| "Stay With Me" | The Faces | Radio:Active (Japanese edition) | 2008 |
| "A Town Called Malice" | The Jam | Radio 1 Established 1967 | 2007 |
| "The Way You Make Me Feel" | Foolproof (Originally titled "Can't Stop Diggin'") | All the Greatest Hits | 2007 |
| "Umbrella" | Rihanna | The Heart Never Lies CD1 | 2007 |
| "The Winner Takes It All" | ABBA | Lies CD1 | 2008 |
| "You're The One That I Want" | John Travolta and Olivia Newton-John | Over The Rainbow | 2007 |
| "You've Got A Friend" | Carole King | All the Greatest Hits | 2005 |

== Live Covers ==
- "American Idiot" (Green Day) Performed on the Wonderland Tour
- "Black or White" (Michael Jackson) Performed on the Radio:ACTIVE Tour
- "Born To Run" (Bruce Springsteen) Performed on BBC Radio 1
- "The Boys Are Back In Town" (Thin Lizzy) Performed at The Prince's Trust Concert
- "Dancing in the Dark" (Bruce Springsteen) Performed during the 2022 Summer tour
- "Ghostbusters Theme" (Ray Parker Jr) Performed on the Motion in the Ocean Tour
- "Happy Christmas (War Is Over)" (John Lennon) Performed on BBC Radio 1.
- "Honky Tonk Women" (The Rolling Stones)
- "I Want to Hold Your Hand" (The Beatles) Performed on Children In Need.
- "I Gotta Feeling" (Black Eyed Peas) Performed on the 2009 European tour
- "Let It Snow" Performed at the Popworld Christmas Concert.
- "Little Saint Nick" (The Beach Boys) Performed at the EastEnders Christmas Party.
- "On My Own" (The Used)
- "Pass Out" (Tinie Tempah) Performed on the Above the Noise Tour
- "The Promise" (Girls Aloud) Performed on the "Up Close... And This Time, It's Personal" tour
- "Rocks" (Primal Scream) Performed with Charlotte Church on The Charlotte Church Show
- "YMCA" (Village People) Performed on the Motion in the Ocean Tour
- "Dynamite" (Taio Cruz) Performed on Radio 1 Live Lounge and on the Before the Noise tour
- "My Heart Will Go On" (Celine Dion) Performed on the McBusted tour by Dougie

== Unreleased ==
Room on the 3rd Floor era

- "Hold Me Closer" (featuring Anthony Brant) - leaked in Danny's "room" on the band's website SuperCity
- Memory Lane Demo from memory lane the best of Mcfly
- Surfer Babe (2003 Demo)
- That Girl (Original 2003 Demo)
- Obviously (Original 2003 Demo)
- Crazy Little Thing Called Love

Wonderland era

- "Diarrhea" - an impromptu song played by Dougie during the Wonderland Tour, a live version can be heard on The Wonderland Tour 2005
- "We Want to Thank You" - a re-written version of "All About You", with lyrics specifically for Comic Relief
- "Honesty" (featuring Vicky Jones) - leaked in Danny's "room" on SuperCity, written at the same time as "Don't Know Why"
- Ultraviolet (Live Version)
- Wonderland Original title for Ultraviolet
- I Wanna Hold You (Instrumental)
- Easy Way Out
- McFly Rollercoaster
- The Ballad Of Paul K (Radio Edit)
- I Predict A Riot (From Radio 1 Live Lounge)
- All About You (Orchestral Version)

Motion in the Ocean era

- "It Takes A Little Time" (demo) - leaked on YouTube
- "Little Woman" (acoustic demo) - a track that evolved into "Dancing Shoes" (see below) and later "Friday Night"
- "Dancing Shoes " (demo) - a more advanced version of "Little Woman", which later evolved into "Friday Night"
- "Sorry isn't Good Enough" - an early version of "Sorry's Not Good Enough"
- "Star Boy" - a remake of "Star Girl", with lyrics about ex-BBC Radio 1 host Chris Moyles
- Mess Around You Demo
- Please, Please (Radio Version)

Radioactive era

- "Lies, Live Forever" - a power ballad which evolved into "Lies"
- "Makin' Luv'" - an unreleased B-side
- Falling In Love (Radio Edit)
- The Heart Never Lies
- One For The Radio (Radio Edit)
- POV (Acoustic)
- Everybody Knows Demo

Above the Noise era

- "Here Comes The Storm" - leaked on YouTube
- "Save Me" - an alternate version of "Nowhere Left to Run"
- "Na Na Na Lonely" - an alternate version of "That's The Truth"
- "Teenage" - mentioned on Supercity
- "Foolish" (demo version) - an early version leaked on SuperCity
- "This Song" (demo version) - an early version sung entirely by Tom
- "Cross the River" - a partial song idea, played in a video on SuperCity
- "Eastern Side" (demo) - played during a Webchat with Tom on SuperCity
- Hotel On A Hill
- Party Girl (Danny Jones Remix)
- Party Girl (Doman & Gooding Remix)

Post Above the Noise

- "Million Girls" (demo) (featuring Carrie Fletcher & Future Boy) - leaked on SuperCity
- "I Want, I Want" (demo) - later recorded by One Direction for their debut album Up All Night as "I Want"
- "Stars" (demo) - written by Tom, potentially for a solo project
- "Alone Again (Higher)" - a track rumoured to have been written for The Saturdays
- "The BeeGees" - a song written in Atlanta, possibly during the same sessions as The Lost Songs
- "Something New" (demo) - appears on unofficial promotional copies of The Lost Songs

== Alternate versions ==
- "5 Colours in Her Hair" (US version) - Just My Luck
- "All About You" (Orchestral version) - "All About You/You've Got a Friend"
- "Ultraviolet/The Ballad of Paul K" (Orchestral version) - "Ultraviolet/The Ballad of Paul K" CD1
- "Do Ya" (Acoustic) - Radio:Active (Woolworths version)
- "Falling in Love" (Acoustic) - Radio:Active (Woolworths version)
- "Forever's Not Enough" (Acoustic) - Power to Play (deluxe version)
- "I Wanna Hold You" (single version) - Just My Luck
- "I Got You" (US version) - Just My Luck
- "I'm Fine" (Acoustic) - Power to Play (deluxe version)
- "Lies" (Johnny Phonett remix) - Radio:Active (Townsend version)
- "Lies" (Johnny Phonett Dub) - Radio:Active (Townsend version)
- "Obviously" (remix) - "Obviously" CD2
- "POV" (Acoustic) - Radio:Active (Woolworths version)
- "Unsaid Things" (US version) - Just My Luck
- Shine A Light Without Taio Cruz (Mcfly Solo Version)
- Five Colours In Her Hair (USA Release 2006)
