= List of UK top-ten singles in 2005 =

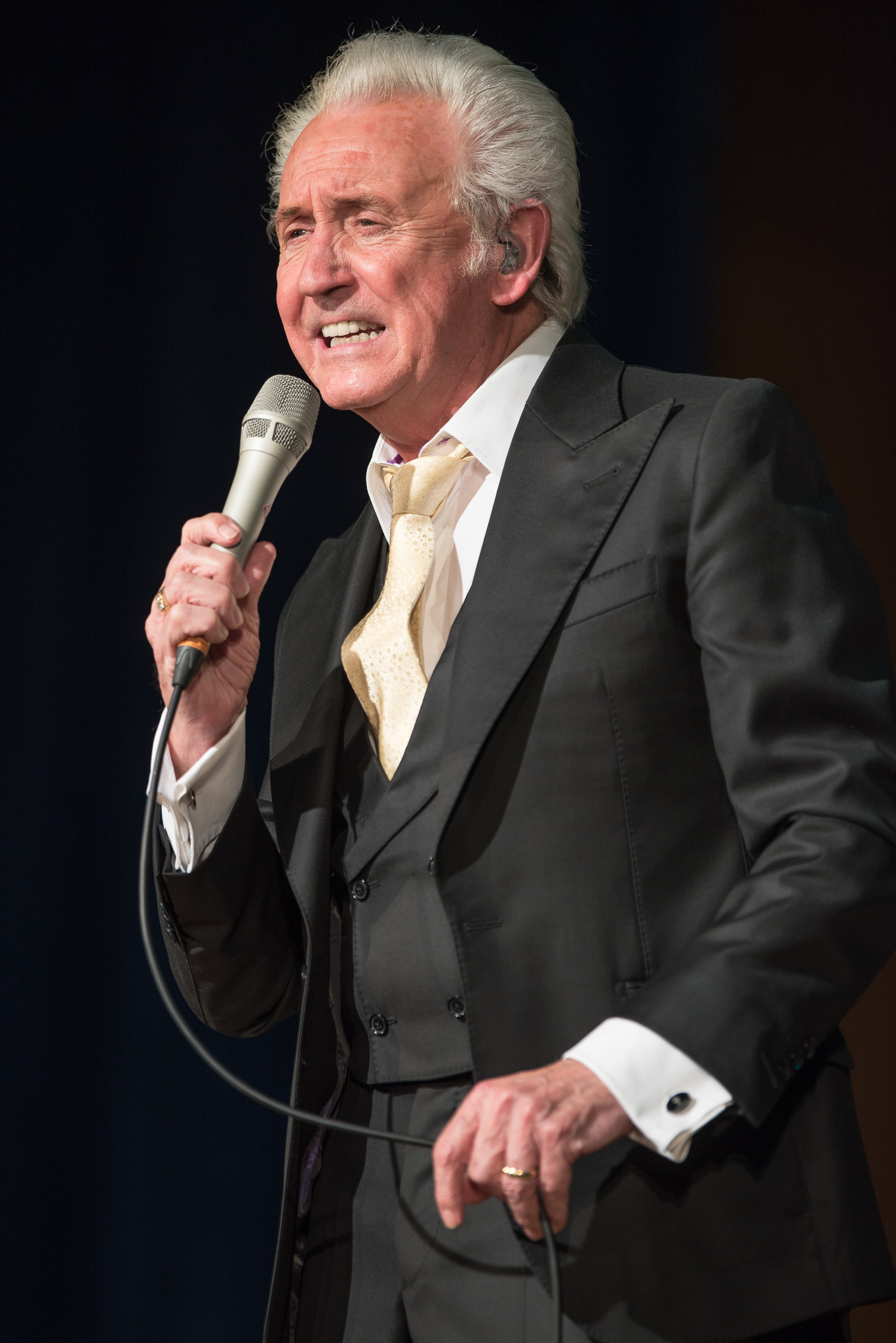
Tony Christie had the best-selling single of the year with "(Is This the Way to) Amarillo", re-released in aid of Comic Relief. The music video featured the comedian Peter Kay (who was credited on the release) and the single topped the chart for seven weeks. When it was initially released in 1971, the song peaked at number 18 in the UK.

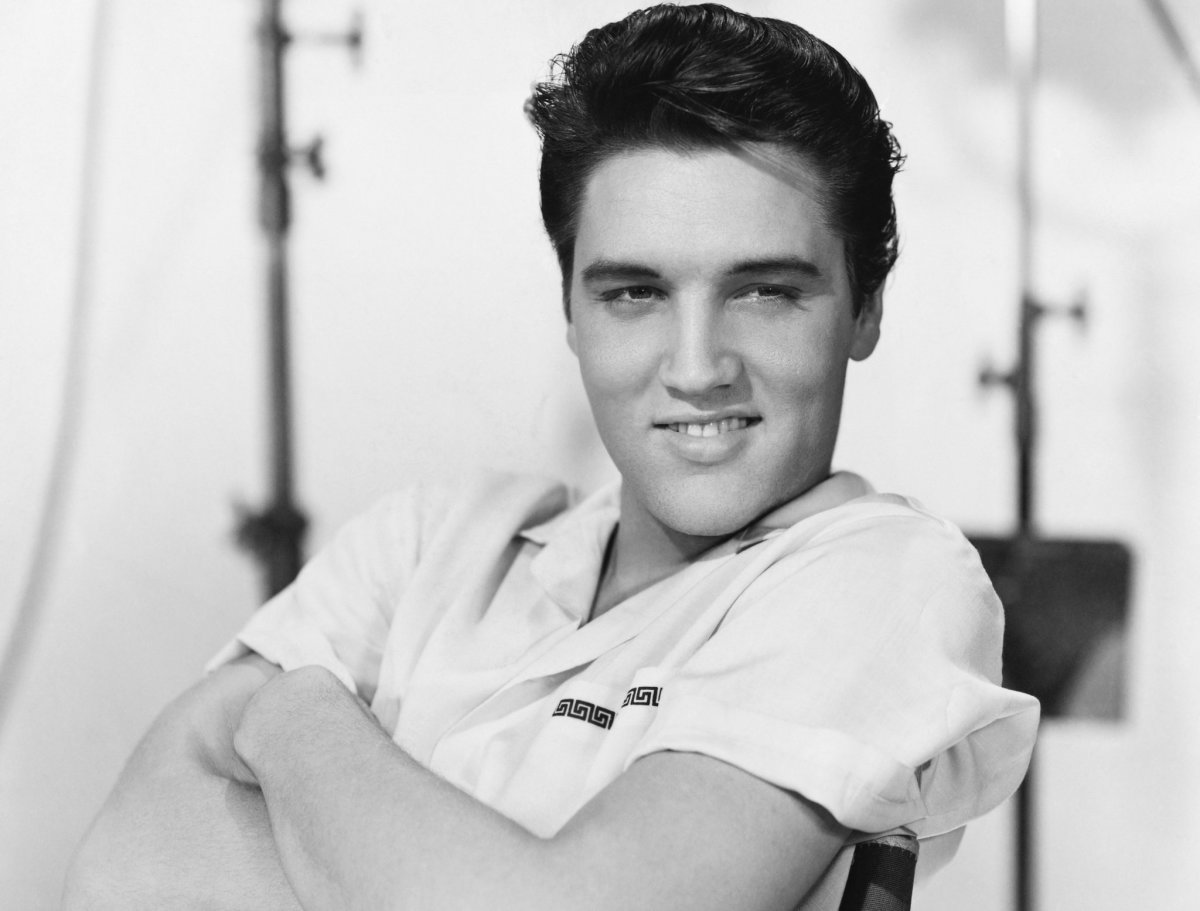
Elvis Presley had seventeen singles in the UK top 10 this year, setting a record, which still stands to this day, as the artist with the most UK top 10 entries in a single year. These entries were re-issues of all his UK number-one singles. The re-released singles were issued to mark what would have been Presley's 70th birthday. Three of these topped the chart: "Jailhouse Rock", "One Night"/"I Got Stung" (which became the 1000th number-one in the UK Singles Chart) and "It's Now or Never".

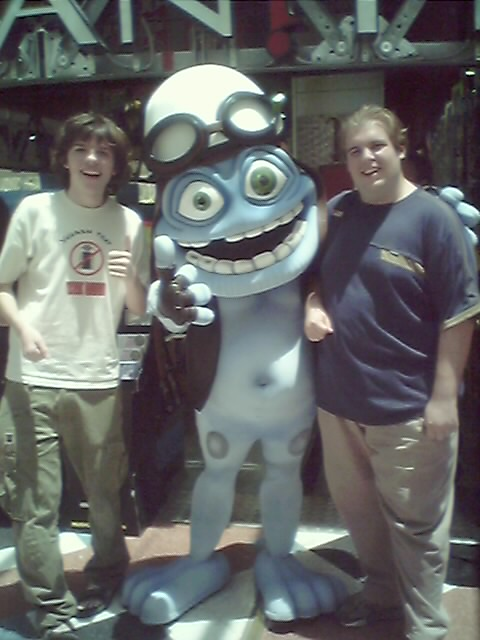
Crazy Frog spent four weeks at number-one with its cover version of "Axel F", which became the third biggest-selling single of 2005. Crazy Frog scored a second top 10 hit later in the year with "Jingle Bells/U Can't Touch This", which peaked at number five in December.

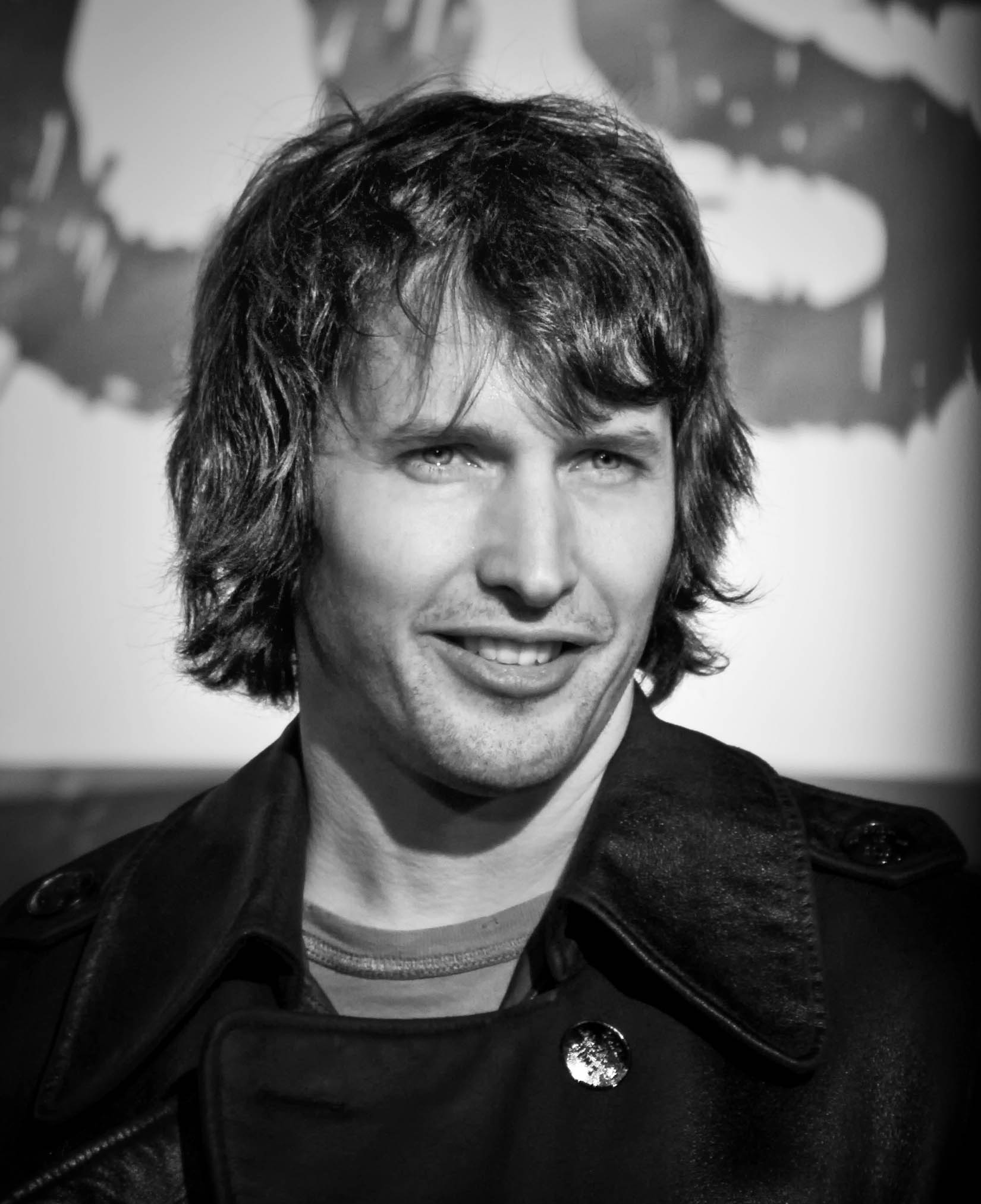
James Blunt's "You're Beautiful" was the fourth best selling single of this year, spending 13 consecutive weeks in the top 10, with five straight weeks at number-one.

The UK Singles Chart is one of many music charts compiled by the Official Charts Company that calculates the best-selling singles of the week in the United Kingdom. Since 2004 the chart has been based on the sales of both physical singles and digital downloads, with airplay figures excluded from the official chart. This list shows singles that peaked in the Top 10 of the UK Singles Chart during 2005, as well as singles which peaked in 2004 and 2006 but were in the top 10 in 2005. The entry date is when the song appeared in the top 10 for the first time (week ending, as published by the Official Charts Company, which is six days after the chart is announced).

Two hundred and twenty-eight singles were in the top ten in 2005. Ten singles from 2004 remained in the top 10 for several weeks at the beginning of the year, while "When I'm Gone" by Eminem was released in 2005 but did not reach its peak until 2006. Fifty-two artists scored multiple entries in the top 10 in 2005. Akon, Arctic Monkeys, James Blunt, Rihanna, Kaiser Chiefs and The Pussycat Dolls were among the many artists who achieved their first UK charting top 10 single in 2005.

To mark Elvis Presley's 70th birthday, all eighteen of his UK number-one singles were re-released. The first single, "All Shook Up", came with a collectors' box that made it ineligible to chart again; each of the other seventeen reissues hit the UK top 5. Two of the three re-released singles which topped the chart - "One Night"/"I Got Stung" and "It's Now or Never" - were also the first and second singles in chart history to spend their only week in the top 10 at number-one before dropping out.

The 2004 Christmas number-one, "Do They Know It's Christmas?" by Band Aid 20, remained at number-one for the first week of 2005. The first new number-one single of the year was "Against All Odds" by 2004 X Factor winner Steve Brookstein. Overall, twenty-eight different singles peaked at number-one in 2005, with Elvis Presley (3) having the most singles hit that position.

== Background ==
=== Elvis Presley sets chart records ===
Elvis Presley set several chart records in 2005. With a selection of his back-catalogue (all his UK number-one singles) being reissued to mark what would have been the late singer's 70th birthday, his seventeen entries were the most by any artist in the same year. It remains a record as of 2024, with Ed Sheeran's 2017 haul of eleven top 10s in a calendar year the closest anyone has come since (Sheeran had seventeen singles in the top 20 that year).

On 16 January 2005 (22 January 2005, week ending), the re-release of Presley's 1959 chart-topper "One Night"/"I Got Stung" became the 1000th number-one in the UK Singles Chart. "One Night"/"I Got Stung" also became one of the first singles to drop out of the top 10 entirely the week after topping the chart. The feat was repeated by another Presley classic, “It's Now or Never”, with its only week in the top ten spent on top of the chart. “Baby's Coming Back”/Transylvania” by McFly (2007) was the next single to join Presley on the list.

=== Multiple entries ===
Two hundred and twenty-eight singles charted in 2005, with two-hundred and seventeen singles reaching their peak this year (including the re-entry "Fairytale of New York" and a series of Elvis Presley re-releases which charted in previous years but reached a peak on their latest chart run). Cabin Crew and Sunset Strippers both reached the charts with a remixed version of "Waiting for a Star to Fall", under the title "Star to Fall" and "Falling Stars" respectively.

Fifty-two artists scored multiple entries in the top 10 in 2005. Elvis Presley had the most top ten singles in 2005 with seventeen in total. All the singles had been UK number-ones for Presley and they were re-released to mark what would have been his 70th birthday. Three of the singles peaked at number-one: "Jailhouse Rock" and "One Night"/"I Got Stung" in January (the 1000th number-one in the UK Singles Chart), and "It's Now or Never" in February. "A Fool Such As I"/"I Need Your Love Tonight", "Are You Lonesome Tonight?", "Wooden Heart", "Surrender", "Good Luck Charm", "(You're the) Devil in Disguise", "Crying in the Chapel" and "Way Down" all reached a high of number two in 2005. Of his other entries, "(Marie's the Name) His Latest Flame"/"Little Sister", "Rock-A-Hula Baby"/"Can't Help Falling in Love", "She's Not You" and "A Little Less Conversation" each charted at number three, while "The Wonder of You" (4) and "Return to Sender" (5) completed his haul.

50 Cent and Girls Aloud both recorded five top ten hit singles this year. The former spent eleven weeks in the top 10 with his five entries, which included a collaboration on The Game's number four single "Hate It or Love It". "Candy Shop" peaked at the same position, while he had another feature on another song with The Game, "How We Do", which reached number five. "Outta Control Remix" landed at number seven and "Just a Lil Bit" squeezed into the top ten.

Girls Aloud's "I'll Stand by You" originally charted at number-one at the end of 2004 in support of Children in Need and spent a couple more weeks near the top of the chart in January 2005. "Wake Me Up" was their next hit when it reached number four in March. "Long Hot Summer" took seventh spot in September, "Biology" was another number four entry and they finished the year with "See the Day" peaking at number ten.

Chris Martin and Bono's four top ten hits include their vocals on Band Aid 20 at the end of 2004. Martin had three top tens with his band Coldplay in 2005 - "Speed of Sound" (2), "Fix You" (4) and "Talk" (10). Similarly, Bono's other successful singles were as part of U2, the best performing being the number-one single "Sometimes You Can't Make It On Your Own" in February. "City of Blinding Lights" (2) just missed the top spot in June and "All Because of You" in October peaked at number four.

American rapper Eminem also had four top ten hits in the UK across 2005. "Like Toy Soldiers" became the sixth number-one single of his career in February, after "The Real Slim Shady", "Stan" (both 2000), "Without Me", "Lose Yourself" (both 2002) and "Just Lose It" (2004). "Ass Like That", "Mockingbird" and "When I'm Gone" all reached number four. The final act with four entries in 2005 were McFly. Charity single for Comic Relief, "All About You"/"You've Got a Friend", and "I'll Be OK" both topped the chart, while "I Wanna Hold You" made number three. They ended the year with number 9 hit "Ultraviolet"/"The Ballad of Paul K".

Girl group Sugababes was one of a number of artists with three top-ten entries, including number one "Push the Button". Akon, Ciara, Kaiser Chiefs, Oasis, Robbie Williams and The White Stripes were among the other artists who had multiple top 10 entries in 2005.

=== Chart debuts ===
Seventy artists achieved their first top 10 single in 2005, either as a lead or featured artist. Of these, four went on to record another hit single that year: Bloc Party, Crazy Frog, Goldfrapp and The Pussycat Dolls. Akon, Ciara, The Game and Kaiser Chiefs all had two other entries in their breakthrough year.

The following table (collapsed on desktop site) does not include acts who had previously charted as part of a group and secured their first top 10 solo single.

Artist	Number of top 10s	First entry	Chart position	Other entries
Steve Brookstein	1	"Against All Odds"	1	—
Uniting Nations	1	"Out of Touch"	7	—
Dana Rayne	1	"Object of My Desire"	7	—
Soul Central	1	"String of Life (Stronger on My Own)"	6	—
Kathy Brown	1	"String of Life (Stronger on My Own)"	6	—
Ciara	3	"Goodies"	1	"1, 2 Step" (3), "Oh" (4)
Petey Pablo	1	"Goodies"	1	—
Athlete	1	"Wires"	4	—
One World Project	1	"Grief Never Grows Old"	4	—
Hank Linderman	1	"Grief Never Grows Old"	4	—
Jeffrey Foskett	1	"Grief Never Grows Old"	4	—
Mike Read	1	"Grief Never Grows Old"	4	—
Randell Kirsch	1	"Grief Never Grows Old"	4	—
Lovefreekz	1	"Shine"	7	—
Freefaller	1	"Do This! Do That!"	8	—
Xzibit	1	"Hey Now (Mean Muggin)"	9	—
Bloc Party	2	"So Here We Are/Positive Tension"	5	"Two More Years" (7)
T.I.	1	"Soldier"	4	—
Lil Wayne	1	"Soldier"	4	—
Frankey Maxx	1	"Angel Eyes"	7	—
7 Aurelius	1	"Hush"	3	—
The Game	3	"How We Do"	5	"Dreams" (8), "Hate It or Love It" (3)
Tim McGraw	1	"Over and Over"	1	—
Akon	3	"Locked Up"	5	"Belly Dancer (Bananza)" (5), "Lonely" (1)
Kaiser Chiefs	3	"Oh My God"	6	"Everyday I Love You Less and Less" (10), "I Predict a Riot"/"Sink That Ship" (9)
The Futureheads	1	"Hounds of Love"	7	—
Cabin Crew	1	"Star to Fall"	7	—
The Bravery	1	"An Honest Mistake"	7	—
Sunset Strippers	1	"Falling Stars"	3	—
Phantom Planet	1	"California"	9	—
Peter Kay	1	"(Is This the Way to) Amarillo"	1	—
Jem	1	"They"	6	—
G4	1	"Bohemian Rhapsody"	9	—
Mario	1	"Let Me Love You"	2	—
Olivia	1	"Candy Shop"	4	—
Freeloaders	1	"So Much Love to Give"	9	—
Bodyrockers	1	"I Like the Way"	3	—
Nine Inch Nails	1	"The Hand That Feeds"	7	—
Caesars	1	"Jerk It Out"	8	—
Charlie Wilson	1	"Signs"	2	—
The Tears	1	"Refugees"	9	—
Weezer	1	"Beverly Hills"	9	—
Lil Jon	1	"Get Low"/"Lovers and Friends"	10	—
Max Graham	1	"Owner of a Lonely Heart"	8	—
Crazy Frog	2	"Axel F"	1	"Jingle Bells/U Can't Touch This" (5)
Amerie	1	"1 Thing"	4	—
Audio Bullys	1	"Shot You Down"	3	—
James Blunt	1	"You're Beautiful"	1	—
Fightstar	1	"Paint Your Target"	9	—
Bobby Valentino	1	"Slow Down"	4	—
MVP	1	"Roc Ya Body (Mic Check 1 2)"	5	—
Hard-Fi	1	"Hard to Beat"	9	—
Daddy Yankee	1	"Gasolina"	5	—
Daniel Powter	1	"Bad Day"	2	—
Goldfrapp	2	"Ooh La La"	4	"Number 1" (9)
British Whale	1	"This Town Ain't Big Enough for Both of Us"	6	—
Rihanna	1	"Pon de Replay"	2	—
The Pussycat Dolls	2	"Don't Cha"	1	"Stickwitu" (1)
Mylo	1	"Doctor Pressure"	3	—
Mobb Deep	1	"Outta Control (Remix)"	7	—
Jamie Foxx	1	"Gold Digger"	2	—
Friday Hill	1	"Baby Goodbye"	5	—
Arctic Monkeys	1	"I Bet You Look Good on the Dancefloor"	1	—
Son of Dork	1	"Ticket Outta Loserville"	3	—
Bootie Brown	1	"Dirty Harry"	6	—
Tom Novy	1	"Your Body"	10	—
Michael Marshall	1	"Your Body"	10	—
DHT	1	"Listen to Your Heart"	7	—
Nizlopi	1	"JCB Song"	1	—
Shayne Ward	1	"That's My Goal"	1	—

Notes

One World Project featured several artists who had previously charted in their own right as solo artists, including Boy George, Cliff Richard, Robin Gibb and Russell Watson. Many other participants had only reached the top 10 in the line-up of their bands, namely Barry Gibb (Bee Gees), Bill Wyman (The Rolling Stones), Brian Wilson (The Beach Boys), Célena Cherry (Honeyz), Dewey Bunnell and Gerry Beckley (both America), Jon Anderson and Rick Wakeman (both Yes), Kenney Jones (Small Faces, Faces and The Who) and Steve Winwood (The Spencer Davis Group). The Tears was made up of ex-Suede members Brett Anderson and Bernard Butler, who had had a string of top 10 hits with their previous band but debuted with their new project in 2005.

Fightstar included Charlie Simpson, formerly of Busted, whose previous top 10 singles included "Crashed the Wedding", "Year 3000" and "Who's David". Simpson's former bandmate James Bourne formed Son of Dork after the band split and charted at number 3 with "Ticket Outta Loserville". Lee Ryan made his solo debut outside Blue when "Army of Lovers" reached number 3 in the chart. Bandmate Simon Webbe had two top 10 singles in 2005, "Lay Your Hands" and "No Worries" both peaking at number four.

British Whale was a solo project by Justin Hawkins of The Darkness who had debuted with "I Believe in a Thing Called Love" in 2003. Friday Hill was made up of three members of the successful collective Blazin' Squad: Flava, Kenzie and Strider. Edmée Daenen of the band DHT's was credited separately on the cover of "Listen to Your Heart".

=== Songs from films ===
Original songs from various films entered the top 10 throughout the year. These included "Jailhouse Rock" (from Jailhouse Rock), "1 Thing (from Hitch) and "These Boots Are Made for Walkin'" (The Dukes of Hazzard). "Long Hot Summer" was also recorded for Herbie: Fully Loaded but never made the soundtrack.

=== Charity singles ===
A number of singles recorded for charity reached the top 10 in the charts in 2005. The Comic Relief single was the double-A side "All About You"/"You've Got a Friend" by McFly, peaking at number-one on 19 March 2005.

A second single was released in aid of Comic Relief, a re-release of Tony Christie's "(Is This the Way to) Amarillo", featuring comedian Peter Kay, who shot a music video featuring various celebrities and was credited on the release. It topped the charts on 26 March 2005 and spent eleven weeks in the top 10, including seven at number-one.

Liberty X recorded the Children in Need single for 2005, "A Night to Remember". It was the eighth top 10 single of their career and reached number six on 26 November 2005.

Band Aid 20's "Do They Know It's Christmas?", first released in 2004, also spent several weeks in the top 10 at the beginning of the year, having peaked at number-one on 11 December 2004.

=== Best-selling singles ===
Tony Christie featuring Peter Kay had the best-selling single of the year with "(Is This the Way to) Amarillo". The song spent eleven weeks in the top 10 (including seven weeks at number one), sold over 1.1 million copies and was certified 2× platinum by the BPI (July 2013). "That's My Goal" by Shayne Ward came in second place, selling more than 874,000 copies and losing out by around 226,000 sales. Crazy Frog's "Axel F", "You're Beautiful" from James Blunt and "Don't Cha" by The Pussycat Dolls featuring Busta Rhymes made up the top five. Singles by McFly, Akon Madonna, Westlife and Sugababes were also in the top ten best-selling singles of the year.

"(Is This the Way to) Amarillo" (3) and "That's My Goal" (8) were both ranked in the top 10 best-selling singles of the decade.

== Top-ten singles ==
Key

Symbol	Meaning
‡	Single peaked in 2004 but still in chart in 2005.
♦	Single released in 2005 but peaked in 2006.
(#)	Year-end top ten single position and rank
Entered	The date that the single first appeared in the chart.
Peak	Highest position that the single reached in the UK Singles Chart.

Entered (week ending)	Weeks in top 10	Single	Artist	Peak	Peak reached (week ending)	Weeks at peak
Singles in 2004
27 November 2004	6	"I'll Stand by You"‡	Girls Aloud	1	27 November 2004	2
27 November 2004	7	"If There's Any Justice"‡	Lemar	3	27 November 2004	2
4 December 2004	3	"Tilt Ya Head Back"‡ ^{[A]}	Nelly & Christina Aguilera	5	4 December 2004	1
11 December 2004	6	"Do They Know It's Christmas"‡ ^{[B]}	Band Aid 20	1	11 December 2004	4
11 December 2004	5	"You Can Do It"‡	Ice Cube featuring Mack 10 & Ms. Toi	2	11 December 2004	1
11 December 2004	6	"Boulevard of Broken Dreams"‡	Green Day	5	11 December 2004	1
11 December 2004	4	"Unwritten"‡	Natasha Bedingfield	6	11 December 2004	4
18 December 2004	4	"I Believe in You"‡	Kylie Minogue	2	18 December 2004	1
25 December 2004	3	"Father and Son"‡	Ronan Keating featuring Yusuf Islam	2	25 December 2004	1
25 December 2004	2	"I Got You Babe"/"Soda Pop"‡	Bo' Selecta!	5	25 December 2004	1
Singles in 2005
1 January 2005	4	"Against All Odds"	Steve Brookstein	1	8 January 2005	1
8 January 2005	5	"Out of Touch"	Uniting Nations	7	8 January 2005	1
15 January 2005	2	"Jailhouse Rock" ^{[C]}	Elvis Presley	1	15 January 2005	1
15 January 2005	2	"The Number of the Beast"	Iron Maiden	3	15 January 2005	1
15 January 2005	1	"Breathe"	Erasure	4	15 January 2005	1
15 January 2005	1	"Filthy/Gorgeous"	Scissor Sisters	5	15 January 2005	1
15 January 2005	1	"Object of My Desire"	Dana Rayne	7	15 January 2005	1
15 January 2005	1	"Cutt Off"	Kasabian	8	15 January 2005	1
22 January 2005	1	"One Night"/"I Got Stung" ^{[C]}	Elvis Presley	1	22 January 2005	1
22 January 2005	1	"Empty Souls"	Manic Street Preachers	2	22 January 2005	1
22 January 2005	2	"Somebody Told Me"	The Killers	3	22 January 2005	1
22 January 2005	2	"Staring at the Sun"	Rooster	5	22 January 2005	1
22 January 2005	1	"Strings of Life (Stronger on My Own)"	Soul Central featuring Kathy Brown	6	22 January 2005	1
22 January 2005	1	"Live Twice"	Darius	7	22 January 2005	1
29 January 2005	4	"Goodies"	Ciara featuring Petey Pablo	1	29 January 2005	1
29 January 2005	1	"A Fool Such as I"/"I Need Your Love Tonight" ^{[C]}	Elvis Presley	2	29 January 2005	1
29 January 2005	4	"Galvanize"	The Chemical Brothers	3	29 January 2005	1
29 January 2005	2	"Wires"	Athlete	4	29 January 2005	1
29 January 2005	1	"Tumble and Fall"	Feeder	5	29 January 2005	1
29 January 2005	1	"Breathe In"	Lucie Silvas	6	29 January 2005	1
29 January 2005	1	"Take Me Away"	StoneBridge featuring Therese	9	29 January 2005	1
5 February 2005	1	"It's Now or Never" ^{[C]}	Elvis Presley	1	5 February 2005	1
5 February 2005	3	"Only U"	Ashanti	2	5 February 2005	1
5 February 2005	2	"Grief Never Grows Old" ^{[D]}	One World Project	4	5 February 2005	1
5 February 2005	1	"Shine"	Lovefreekz	6	5 February 2005	1
5 February 2005	1	"Do This! Do That!"	Freefaller	8	5 February 2005	1
5 February 2005	1	"Hey Now (Mean Muggin)"	Xzibit featuring Keri Hilson	9	5 February 2005	1
5 February 2005	1	"Penny & Me"	Hanson	10	5 February 2005	1
12 February 2005	3	"Like Toy Soldiers"	Eminem	1	12 February 2005	1
12 February 2005	1	"Are You Lonesome Tonight?" ^{[C]}	Elvis Presley	2	12 February 2005	1
12 February 2005	3	"Almost Here"	Brian McFadden & Delta Goodrem	3	12 February 2005	1
12 February 2005	1	"So Here We Are"/"Positive Tension"	Bloc Party	5	12 February 2005	1
12 February 2005	1	"I Just Wanna Live"	Good Charlotte	9	12 February 2005	1
19 February 2005	2	"Sometimes You Can't Make It on Your Own"	U2	1	19 February 2005	1
19 February 2005	1	"Wooden Heart" ^{[C]}	Elvis Presley	2	19 February 2005	1
19 February 2005	2	"Soldier"	Destiny's Child featuring T.I. and Lil Wayne	4	19 February 2005	1
19 February 2005	1	"Black and White Town"	Doves	6	19 February 2005	1
19 February 2005	1	"Angel Eyes"	Raghav featuring Frankey Maxx & Jucxi D	7	19 February 2005	1
26 February 2005	4	"Get Right"	Jennifer Lopez	1	26 February 2005	1
26 February 2005	1	"Surrender" ^{[C]}	Elvis Presley	2	26 February 2005	1
26 February 2005	3	"Hush"	LL Cool J featuring 7 Aurelius	3	26 February 2005	1
26 February 2005	2	"How We Do"	The Game featuring 50 Cent	5	26 February 2005	1
26 February 2005	1	"Sunrise"	Angel City	9	26 February 2005	1
26 February 2005	1	"Cradle"	Atomic Kitten	10	26 February 2005	1
5 March 2005	5	"Over and Over"	Nelly featuring Tim McGraw	1	5 March 2005	1
5 March 2005	1	"(Marie's the Name) His Latest Flame"/"Little Sister" ^{[C]}	Elvis Presley	3	5 March 2005	1
5 March 2005	2	"Wake Me Up"	Girls Aloud	4	5 March 2005	1
5 March 2005	3	"Locked Up"	Akon	5	5 March 2005	1
5 March 2005	1	"Oh My God"	Kaiser Chiefs	6	5 March 2005	1
5 March 2005	1	"Hounds of Love"	The Futureheads	8	5 March 2005	1
5 March 2005	1	"Caught Up"	Usher	9	5 March 2005	1
12 March 2005	2	"Dakota"	Stereophonics	1	12 March 2005	1
12 March 2005	1	"Rock-A-Hula Baby"/"Can't Help Falling in Love" ^{[C]}	Elvis Presley	3	12 March 2005	1
12 March 2005	2	"Star to Fall"	Cabin Crew	4	12 March 2005	1
12 March 2005	1	"Do Somethin'"	Britney Spears	6	12 March 2005	1
12 March 2005	1	"An Honest Mistake"	The Bravery	7	12 March 2005	1
19 March 2005	5	"All About You"/"You've Got a Friend" (#6) ^{[E]}	McFly	1	19 March 2005	1
19 March 2005	1	"Good Luck Charm" ^{[C]}	Elvis Presley	2	19 March 2005	1
19 March 2005	3	"Falling Stars"	Sunset Strippers	3	19 March 2005	1
19 March 2005	1	"Krafty"	New Order	8	19 March 2005	1
19 March 2005	1	"California"	Phantom Planet	9	19 March 2005	1
26 March 2005	11	"(Is This the Way to) Amarillo" (#1) ^{[E]}	Tony Christie featuring Peter Kay	1	26 March 2005	7
26 March 2005	1	"She's Not You" ^{[C]}	Elvis Presley	3	26 March 2005	1
26 March 2005	2	"Rich Girl"	Gwen Stefani featuring Eve	4	26 March 2005	1
26 March 2005	1	"They"	Jem	6	26 March 2005	1
26 March 2005	1	"Oh My Gosh"	Basement Jaxx	8	26 March 2005	1
26 March 2005	1	"Bohemian Rhapsody"	G4	9	26 March 2005	1
26 March 2005	1	"Back to Basics"	The Shapeshifters	10	26 March 2005	1
2 April 2005	6	"Let Me Love You"	Mario	2	2 April 2005	1
2 April 2005	5	"Candy Shop"	50 Cent featuring Olivia	4	2 April 2005	2
2 April 2005	1	"Return to Sender" ^{[C]}	Elvis Presley	5	2 April 2005	1
2 April 2005	8	"Switch"	Will Smith	4	30 April 2005	1
2 April 2005	1	"Shiver"	Natalie Imbruglia	8	2 April 2005	1
9 April 2005	1	"(You're the) Devil in Disguise" ^{[C]}	Elvis Presley	2	9 April 2005	1
9 April 2005	3	"It's Like That"	Mariah Carey	4	9 April 2005	1
9 April 2005	1	"Giving You Up"	Kylie Minogue	6	9 April 2005	1
9 April 2005	2	"Time to Grow"	Lemar	9	9 April 2005	2
9 April 2005	1	"Negotiate with Love"	Rachel Stevens	10	9 April 2005	1
16 April 2005	1	"Crying in the Chapel" ^{[C]}	Elvis Presley	2	16 April 2005	1
16 April 2005	1	"Why Do You Love Me"	Garbage	7	16 April 2005	1
16 April 2005	1	"Next Best Superstar"	Melanie C	10	16 April 2005	1
23 April 2005	3	"Somewhere Else"	Razorlight	2	23 April 2005	1
23 April 2005	4	"1, 2 Step"	Ciara featuring Missy Elliott	3	23 April 2005	1
23 April 2005	1	"The Wonder of You" ^{[C]}	Elvis Presley	4	23 April 2005	1
23 April 2005	1	"So Much Love to Give"	Freeloaders featuring The Real Thing	9	23 April 2005	1
30 April 2005	1	"Way Down" ^{[C]}	Elvis Presley	2	30 April 2005	1
30 April 2005	4	"I Like the Way"	BodyRockers	3	30 April 2005	1
30 April 2005	1	"The Hand That Feeds"	Nine Inch Nails	7	30 April 2005	1
30 April 2005	1	"Jerk It Out"	Caesars	8	30 April 2005	1
7 May 2005	4	"Signs"	Snoop Dogg featuring Charlie Wilson & Justin Timberlake	2	7 May 2005	1
7 May 2005	1	"A Little Less Conversation" ^{[C]}^{[F]}	Elvis vs. JXL	3	7 May 2005	1
7 May 2005	2	"Girl"	Destiny's Child	6	7 May 2005	1
7 May 2005	1	"Refugees"	The Tears	9	7 May 2005	1
14 May 2005	7	"Lonely" (#7)	Akon	1	14 May 2005	2
14 May 2005	2	"Mockingbird"	Eminem	4	14 May 2005	1
14 May 2005	1	"Beverly Hills"	Weezer	9	14 May 2005	1
14 May 2005	1	"Get Low"/"Lovers and Friends"	Lil Jon & the East Side Boyz^{[G]}	10	14 May 2005	1
21 May 2005	8	"Feel Good Inc."	Gorillaz	2	21 May 2005	1
21 May 2005	2	"Hate It or Love It"	The Game featuring 50 Cent	4	21 May 2005	1
21 May 2005	1	"In the Morning"	The Coral	6	21 May 2005	1
21 May 2005	1	"One Word"	Kelly Osbourne	9	21 May 2005	1
28 May 2005	2	"Lyla"	Oasis	1	28 May 2005	1
28 May 2005	4	"Don't Phunk with My Heart"	Black Eyed Peas	3	28 May 2005	1
28 May 2005	1	"Hold You Down"	Jennifer Lopez featuring Fat Joe	6	28 May 2005	1
28 May 2005	1	"Owner of a Lonely Heart"	Max Graham vs. Yes	9	28 May 2005	1
28 May 2005	1	"Everyday I Love You Less and Less"	Kaiser Chiefs	10	28 May 2005	1
4 June 2005	10	"Axel F" (#3)	Crazy Frog	1	4 June 2005	4
4 June 2005	2	"Speed of Sound"	Coldplay	2	4 June 2005	1
4 June 2005	4	"1 Thing"	Amerie	4	4 June 2005	1
4 June 2005	2	"Hollaback Girl"	Gwen Stefani	8	4 June 2005	2
4 June 2005	8	"Shot You Down"	Audio Bullys featuring Nancy Sinatra	3	25 June 2005	1
11 June 2005	2	"Best of You"	Foo Fighters	4	11 June 2005	1
11 June 2005	1	"Blue Orchid"	The White Stripes	9	11 June 2005	1
18 June 2005	1	"City of Blinding Lights"	U2	2	18 June 2005	1
18 June 2005	13	"You're Beautiful" (#4)	James Blunt	1	23 July 2005	5
18 June 2005	1	"Feels Just Like It Should"	Jamiroquai	8	18 June 2005	1
25 June 2005	1	"N Dey Say"	Nelly	6	25 June 2005	1
25 June 2005	1	"Why"	DJ Sammy	7	25 June 2005	1
25 June 2005	1	"Wake Me Up When September Ends"	Green Day	8	25 June 2005	1
25 June 2005	1	"Paint Your Target"	Fightstar	9	25 June 2005	1
2 July 2005	8	"Ghetto Gospel"	2Pac featuring Elton John	1	2 July 2005	3
2 July 2005	2	"Slow Down"	Bobby V	4	2 July 2005	1
2 July 2005	6	"Roc Ya Body (Mic Check 1 2)"	MVP	5	2 July 2005	1
2 July 2005	2	"Lose Control"	Missy Elliott featuring Ciara & Fatman Scoop	7	2 July 2005	1
2 July 2005	1	"Hard to Beat"	Hard-Fi	9	2 July 2005	1
2 July 2005	1	"Just a Lil Bit"	50 Cent	10	2 July 2005	1
9 July 2005	4	"Crazy Chick"	Charlotte Church	2	9 July 2005	1
9 July 2005	1	"Incomplete"	Backstreet Boys	8	9 July 2005	1
16 July 2005	6	"We Belong Together"	Mariah Carey	2	16 July 2005	2
16 July 2005	7	"Since U Been Gone"	Kelly Clarkson	5	16 July 2005	2
16 July 2005	1	"Diamonds from Sierra Leone"	Kanye West	8	16 July 2005	1
16 July 2005	1	"So Good"	Rachel Stevens	10	16 July 2005	1
23 July 2005	1	"Electricity"	Elton John	4	23 July 2005	1
23 July 2005	1	"Nasty Girl"	Inaya Day	9	23 July 2005	1
30 July 2005	2	"Army of Lovers"	Lee Ryan	3	30 July 2005	1
30 July 2005	3	"Gasolina"	Daddy Yankee	5	30 July 2005	1
30 July 2005	1	"From the Floorboards Up"	Paul Weller	6	30 July 2005	1
6 August 2005	13	"Bad Day"	Daniel Powter	2	6 August 2005	3
6 August 2005	3	"Ass Like That"	Eminem	4	6 August 2005	1
13 August 2005	2	"Oh"	Ciara featuring Ludacris	4	13 August 2005	1
13 August 2005	1	"Getaway"	Texas	6	13 August 2005	1
13 August 2005	1	"Dreams"	The Game	8	13 August 2005	1
20 August 2005	2	"All the Way"	Craig David	3	20 August 2005	1
20 August 2005	2	"Ooh La La"	Goldfrapp	4	20 August 2005	1
20 August 2005	2	"Belly Dancer (Bananza)"	Akon	5	20 August 2005	1
27 August 2005	2	"I'll Be OK"	McFly	1	27 August 2005	1
27 August 2005	1	"Fuck Forever"	Babyshambles	4	27 August 2005	1
27 August 2005	1	"The Trooper (Live)"	Iron Maiden	5	27 August 2005	1
27 August 2005	1	"This Town Ain't Big Enough for Both of Us"	British Whale	6	27 August 2005	1
3 September 2005	3	"The Importance of Being Idle"	Oasis	1	3 September 2005	1
3 September 2005	5	"Pon de Replay"	Rihanna	2	3 September 2005	2
3 September 2005	3	"Lay Your Hands"	Simon Webbe	4	3 September 2005	1
3 September 2005	2	"Don't Lie"	Black Eyed Peas	6	3 September 2005	1
3 September 2005	1	"Long Hot Summer"	Girls Aloud	7	3 September 2005	1
3 September 2005	1	"I Predict a Riot"/"Sink That Ship"	Kaiser Chiefs	9	3 September 2005	1
3 September 2005	1	"My Doorbell"	The White Stripes	10	3 September 2005	1
10 September 2005	4	"Dare"	Gorillaz	1	10 September 2005	1
10 September 2005	2	"These Boots Are Made for Walkin'"	Jessica Simpson	4	10 September 2005	1
10 September 2005	2	"The One I Love"	David Gray	8	10 September 2005	2
10 September 2005	1	"Jacques Your Body (Make Me Sweat)" ^{[H]}	Les Rhythmes Digitales	9	10 September 2005	1
17 September 2005	10	"Don't Cha" (#5)	The Pussycat Dolls featuring Busta Rhymes	1	17 September 2005	3
17 September 2005	4	"Doctor Pressure"	Mylo vs. Miami Sound Machine	3	17 September 2005	1
17 September 2005	2	"Fix You"	Coldplay	4	17 September 2005	1
24 September 2005	6	"We Be Burnin'"	Sean Paul	2	24 September 2005	1
24 September 2005	1	"Have a Nice Day"	Bon Jovi	6	24 September 2005	1
24 September 2005	1	"Outta Control (Remix)"	50 Cent featuring Mobb Deep	7	24 September 2005	1
24 September 2005	1	"Wings of a Butterfly"	HIM	10	24 September 2005	1
1 October 2005	6	"Gold Digger"	Kanye West featuring Jamie Foxx	2	1 October 2005	1
1 October 2005	1	"Do You Want To"	Franz Ferdinand	4	1 October 2005	1
1 October 2005	2	"Nine Million Bicycles"	Katie Melua	5	1 October 2005	1
1 October 2005	1	"Behind These Hazel Eyes"	Kelly Clarkson	9	1 October 2005	1
8 October 2005	7	"Push the Button" (#10)	Sugababes	1	8 October 2005	3
8 October 2005	4	"Song 4 Lovers"	Liberty X	5	8 October 2005	1
8 October 2005	1	"All About Us"	t.A.T.u.	8	8 October 2005	1
8 October 2005	1	"Call My Name"	Charlotte Church	10	8 October 2005	1
15 October 2005	6	"Tripping"	Robbie Williams	2	15 October 2005	2
15 October 2005	1	"Precious"	Depeche Mode	4	15 October 2005	1
15 October 2005	1	"Two More Years"	Bloc Party	7	15 October 2005	1
15 October 2005	2	"Get Your Number"/"Shake It Off"	Mariah Carey	9	15 October 2005	1
22 October 2005	1	"All Because of You"	U2	4	22 October 2005	1
22 October 2005	2	"Baby Goodbye"	Friday Hill	5	22 October 2005	1
29 October 2005	6	"I Bet You Look Good on the Dancefloor"	Arctic Monkeys	1	29 October 2005	1
29 October 2005	2	"I Wanna Hold You"	McFly	3	29 October 2005	1
5 November 2005	8	"You Raise Me Up" (#9)	Westlife	1	5 November 2005	2
5 November 2005	2	"King of the Mountain"	Kate Bush	4	5 November 2005	1
5 November 2005	2	"Wake Up"	Hilary Duff	7	5 November 2005	1
5 November 2005	1	"Just Want You to Know"	Backstreet Boys	8	5 November 2005	1
12 November 2005	2	"Can I Have It Like That"	Pharrell featuring Gwen Stefani	3	12 November 2005	1
12 November 2005	3	"Don't Love You No More (I'm Sorry)"	Craig David	4	12 November 2005	1
12 November 2005	1	"Number 1"	Goldfrapp	9	12 November 2005	1
19 November 2005	10	"Hung Up" (#8)	Madonna	1	19 November 2005	3
19 November 2005	3	"Ticket Outta Loserville"	Son of Dork	3	19 November 2005	1
19 November 2005	5	"No Worries"	Simon Webbe	4	19 November 2005	2
26 November 2005	8	"My Humps"	Black Eyed Peas	3	26 November 2005	2
26 November 2005	3	"Biology"	Girls Aloud	4	26 November 2005	1
26 November 2005	1	"Switch It On"	Will Young	5	26 November 2005	1
26 November 2005	2	"A Night to Remember" ^{[I]}	Liberty X	6	26 November 2005	1
26 November 2005	1	"One Way Ticket"	The Darkness	8	26 November 2005	1
26 November 2005	1	"The Denial Twist"	The White Stripes	10	26 November 2005	1
3 December 2005	2	"Dirty Harry"	Gorillaz featuring Bootie Brown	6	3 December 2005	1
3 December 2005	1	"Your Body"	Tom Novy featuring Michael Marshall	10	3 December 2005	1
10 December 2005	6	"Stickwitu"	The Pussycat Dolls	1	10 December 2005	2
10 December 2005	2	"Let There Be Love"	Oasis	2	10 December 2005	1
10 December 2005	2	"Because of You"	Kelly Clarkson	7	10 December 2005	1
10 December 2005	1	"Albion"	Babyshambles	8	10 December 2005	1
17 December 2005	4	"Ugly" ^{[J]}	Sugababes	3	17 December 2005	1
17 December 2005	1	"Juicebox"	The Strokes	5	17 December 2005	1
17 December 2005	1	"Listen to Your Heart"	DHT featuring Edmée	7	17 December 2005	1
24 December 2005	8	"JCB Song"	Nizlopi	1	24 December 2005	1
24 December 2005	2	"When You Tell Me That You Love Me"	Westlife featuring Diana Ross	2	24 December 2005	1
24 December 2005	2	"Jingle Bells/U Can't Touch This"	Crazy Frog	5	24 December 2005	1
24 December 2005	1	"Advertising Space"	Robbie Williams	8	24 December 2005	1
24 December 2005	1	"Ultraviolet"/"The Ballad of Paul K"	McFly	9	24 December 2005	1
31 December 2005	8	"That's My Goal" (#2)	Shayne Ward	1	31 December 2005	4
31 December 2005	2	"Fairytale of New York" ^{[V]}	The Pogues featuring Kirsty MacColl	3	31 December 2005	1
31 December 2005	4	"When I'm Gone" ♦	Eminem	4	7 January 2006	1
31 December 2005	2	"See the Day"	Girls Aloud	9	31 December 2005	1
31 December 2005	1	"Talk"	Coldplay	10	31 December 2005	1

== Entries by artist ==
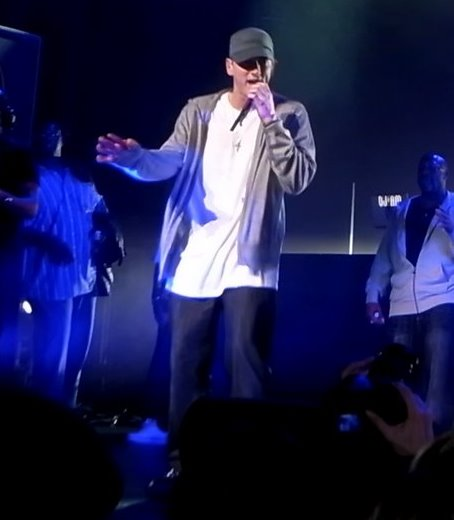
Eminem was a four-time entrant to the UK top 10 in 2005. The highest charting of these entries was "Like Toy Soldiers", which was a number-one hit in February.

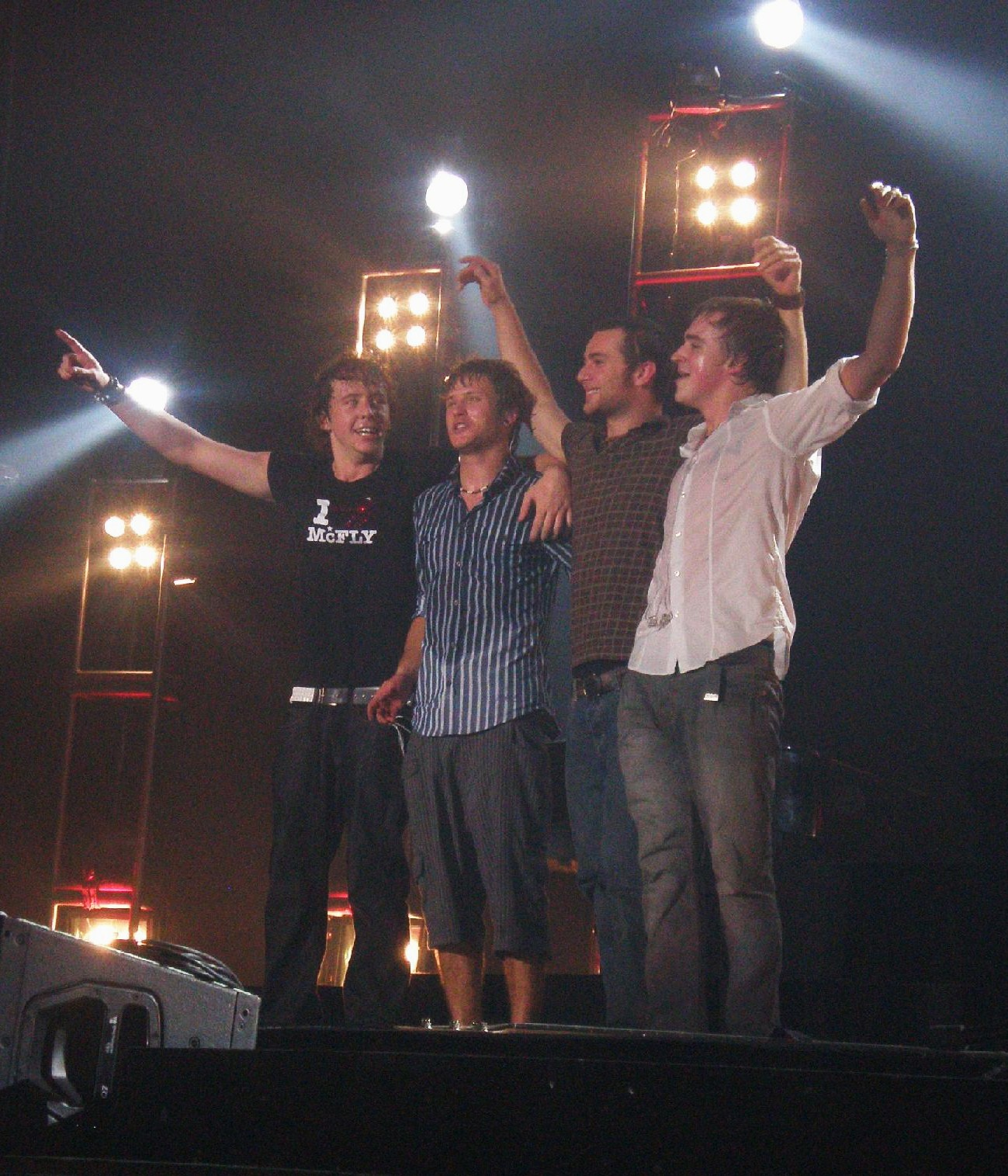
McFly recorded this year's Comic Relief single, "All About You"/"You've Got a Friend". The song stayed at number one for a single week in March. The group had a total of four top 10 hits this year, with "I'll Be OK" also topping the chart.

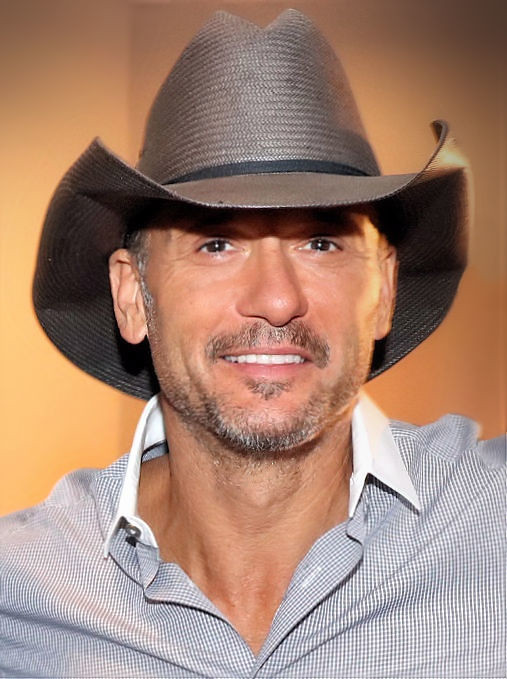
Country music singer Tim McGraw provided guest vocals on Nelly's 2005 number-one hit "Over and Over". As of 2021, it remains McGraw's only top 40 single in the UK.

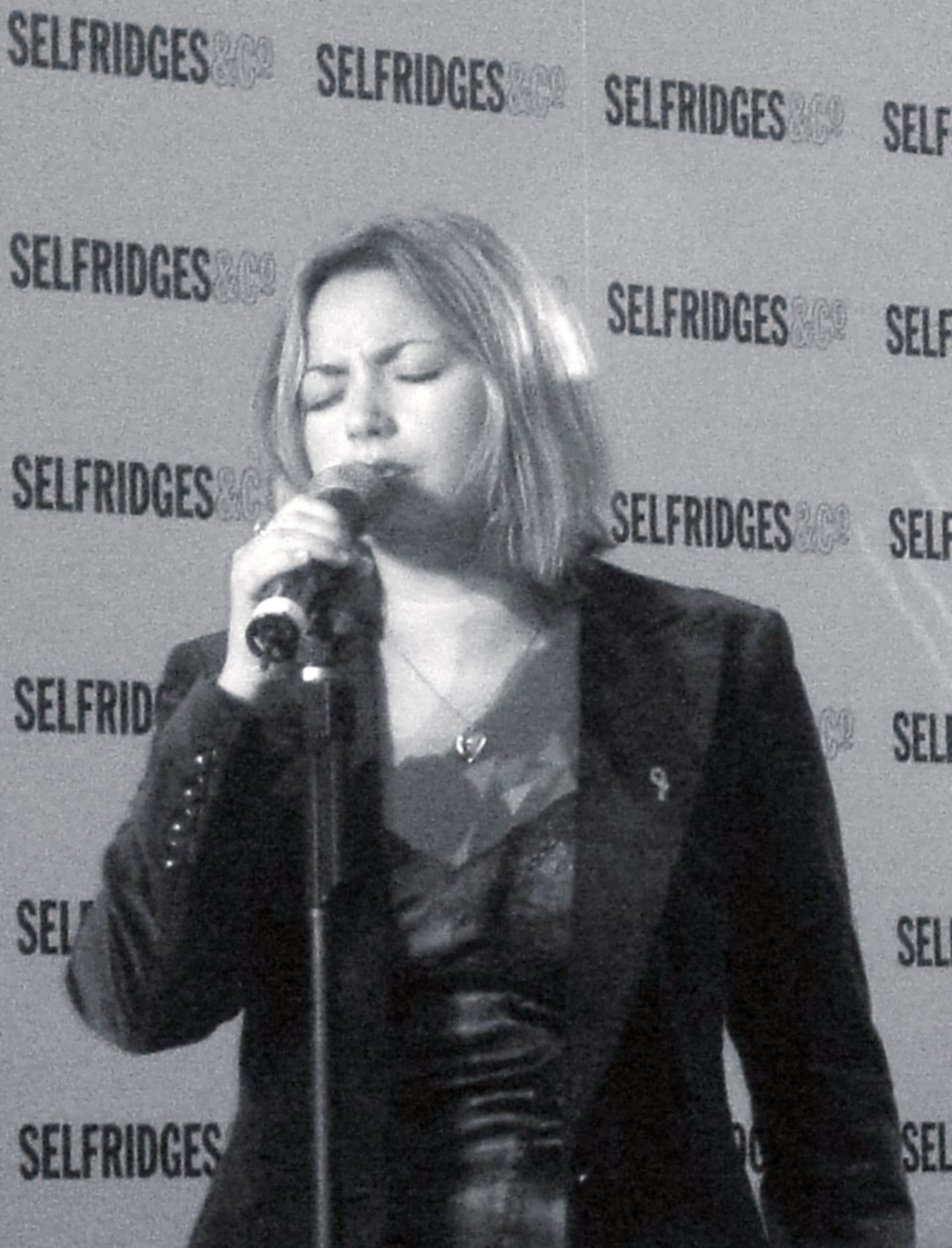
Welsh singer Charlotte Church appeared in the top 10 with two singles this year. The most successful of these was "Crazy Chick", which reached number two in July.

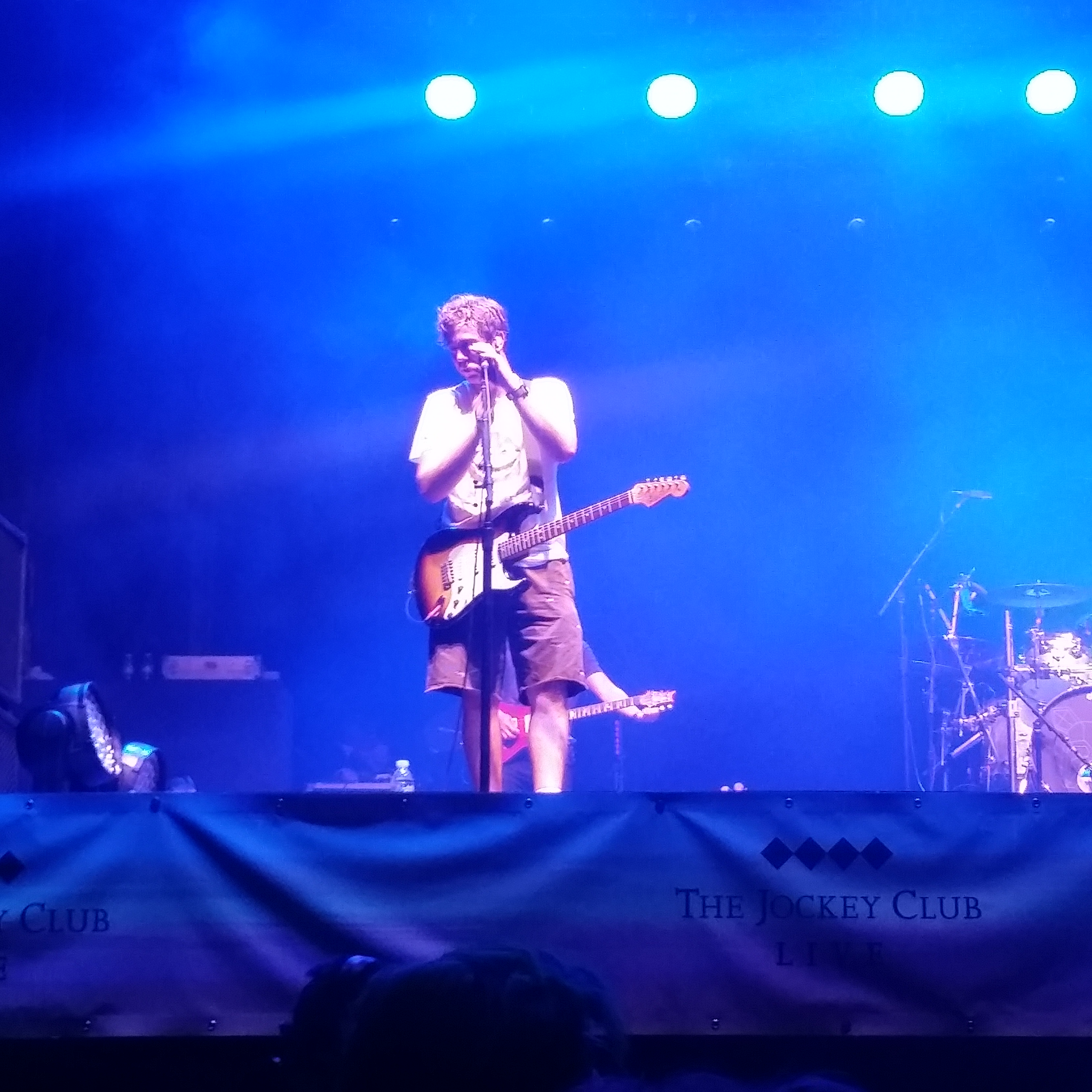
Former Busted singer James Bourne hit the top 10 in November 2005 with his new band Son of Dork, their debut single "Ticket Outta Loserville" reaching number three. He also featured on the Band Aid 20 single.

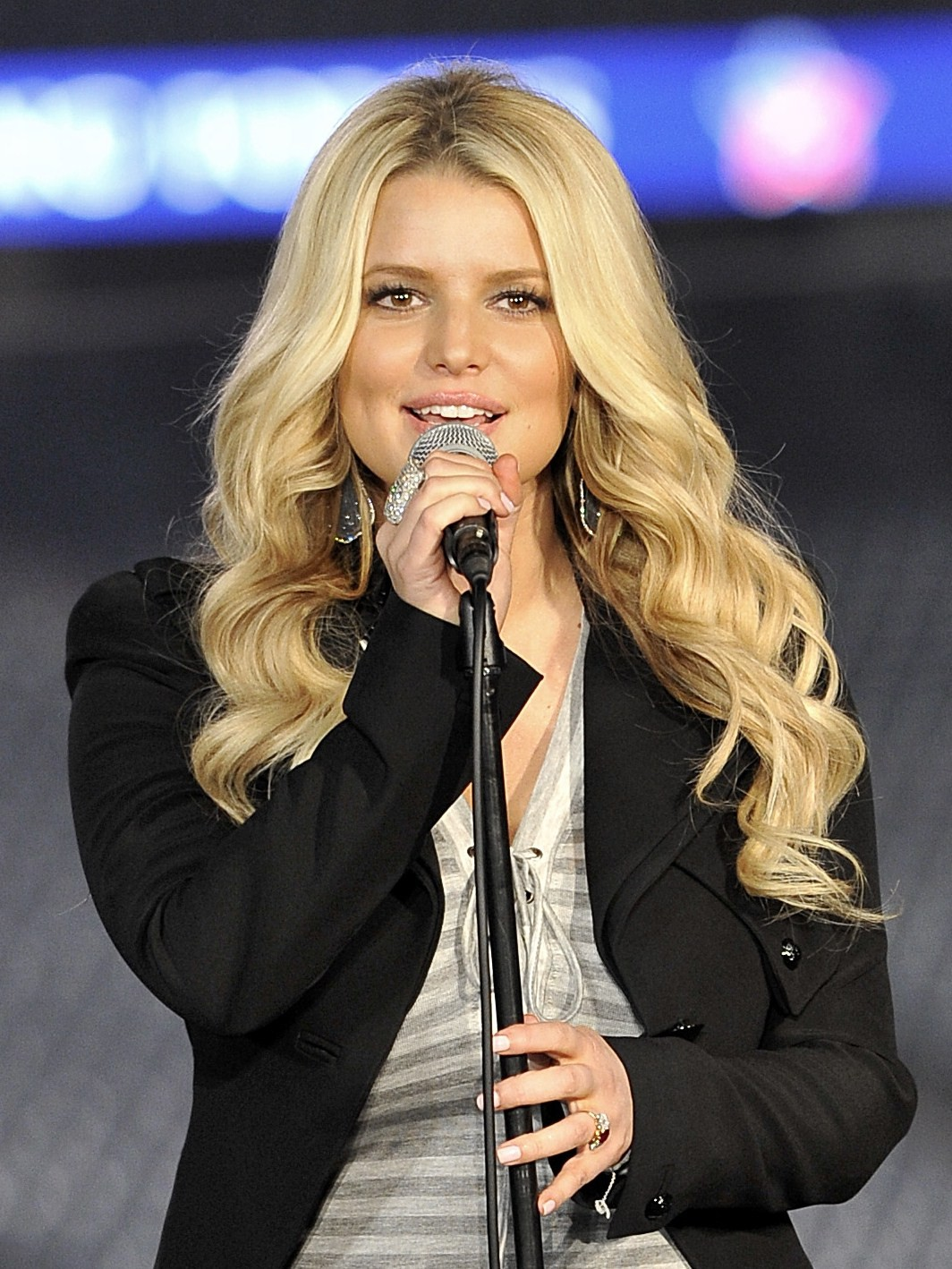
Jessica Simpson recorded a cover of "These Boots Are Made for Walking" for the Dukes of Hazzard film soundtrack. It reached number four in the UK in September of this year.

The following table shows artists who achieved two or more top 10 entries in 2005, including singles that reached their peak in 2004 or 2006. The figures include both main artists and featured artists, while appearances on ensemble charity records are also counted for each artist. The total number of weeks an artist spent in the top ten in 2005 is also shown.

Entries	Artist	Weeks	Singles
17	Elvis Presley	18	"A Fool Such as I"/"I Need Your Love Tonight", "A Little Less Conversation", "Are You Lonesome Tonight?", "Crying in the Chapel", "Good Luck Charm" "(Marie's the Name) His Latest Flame"/"Little Sister", "It's Now or Never", "Jailhouse Rock, "One Night"/"I Got Stung", "Return to Sender", "Rock-A-Hula Baby"/"Can't Help Falling in Love", "She's Not You", "Surrender", "Way Down", "The Wonder of You", "Wooden Heart", "(You're the) Devil in Disguise"
5	50 Cent ^{[K]}	11	"Candy Shop", "Hate It or Love It", "How We Do", "Just a Lil Bit", "Outta Control (Remix)"
5	Girls Aloud ^{[L]}	7	"Biology", "I'll Stand by You", "Long Hot Summer", "Wake Me Up", "See the Day"
4	Bono ^{[L]}^{[M]}^{[N]}	7	"All Because of You", "City of Blinding Lights", "Do They Know It's Christmas?", "Sometimes You Can't Make It on Your Own"
4	Eminem^{[O]}	9	"Ass Like That", "Like Toy Soldiers", "Mockingbird", "When I'm Gone"
4	Chris Martin ^{[L]}^{[M]}^{[P]}	8	"Do They Know It's Christmas?", "Fix You", "Speed of Sound", "Talk"
4	McFly ^{[L]}	10	"All About You"/"You've Got a Friend", "I'll Be OK", "I Wanna Hold You", ""Ultraviolet"/"The Ballad of Paul K"
3
3	Akon	12	"Belly Dancer (Bananza)", "Locked Up", "Lonely"
3	Black Eyed Peas	12	"Don't Lie", "Don't Phunk with My Heart","My Humps"
3	Ciara	10	"1, 2 Step", "Goodies", "Oh"
3	Coldplay	5	"Fix You", "Speed of Sound", "Talk"
3	The Game	5	"Dreams", "Hate It or Love It", "How We Do"
3	Gorillaz	14	"Dare", "Dirty Harry", "Feel Good Inc."
3	Gwen Stefani ^{[Q]}	6	"Can I Have It Like That", "Hollaback Girl", "Rich Girl"
3	Justin Hawkins ^{[L]}^{[M]}^{[R]}	5	"Do They Know It's Christmas?", "One Way Ticket", "This Town Ain't Big Enough for Both of Us"
3	Kaiser Chiefs	3	"Everyday I Love You Less and Less", "I Predict a Riot"/"Sink That Ship", "Oh My God"
3	Kelly Clarkson	10	"Because of You", "Behind These Hazel Eyes", "Since U Been Gone"
3	Lemar ^{[L]}^{[M]}	7	"Do They Know It's Christmas?", "If There's Any Justice", "Time to Grow"
3	Mariah Carey	11	"Get Your Number"/"Shake It Off", "It's Like That", "We Belong Together"
3	Nelly ^{[L]}	7	"'N' Dey Say", "Over and Over", "Tilt Ya Head Back"
3	Oasis	7	"The Importance of Being Idle", "Let There Be Love", "Lyla"
3	Rachel Stevens ^{[L]}^{[M]}	5	"Do They Know It's Christmas?", "Negotiate with Love", "So Good"
3	Robbie Williams ^{[L]}^{[M]}	10	"Advertising Space", "Do They Know It's Christmas?", "Tripping"
3	Sugababes ^{[L]}^{[M]}	13	"Do They Know It's Christmas?", "Push the Button", "Ugly"
3	U2	4	"All Because of You", "City of Blinding Lights", "Sometimes You Can't Make It on Your Own"
3	The White Stripes	3	"Black and White Town", "The Denial Twist", "My Doorbell"
2	Babyshambles	2	"Albion", "Fuck Forever"
2	Backstreet Boys	2	"Incomplete", "Just Want You to Know"
2	Bloc Party	2	"So Here We Are"/"Positive Tension", "Two More Years"
2	Charlie Simpson ^{[L]}^{[M]}	4	"Do They Know It's Christmas?", "Paint Your Target"
2	Charlotte Church	5	"Call My Name", "Crazy Chick"
2	Craig David	5	"All the Way", "Don't Love You No More (I'm Sorry)"
2	Crazy Frog	12	"Axel F", "Jingle Bells/U Can't Touch This"/"U Can't Touch This"
2	Destiny's Child	4	"Girl", "Soldier"
2	Elton John ^{[S]}	9	"Electricity", "Ghetto Gospel"
2	Feeder ^{[L]}^{[M]}	4	"Do They Know It's Christmas?", "Tumble and Fall"
2	Goldfrapp	3	"Number 1", "Ooh La La"
2	Green Day ^{[L]}	9	"Boulevard of Broken Dreams", "Wake Me Up When September Ends"
2	Iron Maiden	3	"The Number of the Beast", "The Trooper (Live)"
2	James Bourne ^{[L]}^{[M]}	6	"Do They Know It's Christmas?", "Ticket Outta Loserville"
2	Jennifer Lopez	5	"Get Right", "Hold You Down"
2	Kanye West	7	"Diamonds from Sierra Leone", "Gold Digger"
2	Katie Melua ^{[L]}^{[M]}	5	"Do They Know It's Christmas?", "Nine Million Bicycles"
2	Kylie Minogue	3	"Giving You Up", "I Believe in You"
2	Liberty X	6	"A Night to Remember", "Song 4 Lovers"
2	Missy Elliott ^{[T]}	6	"1, 2 Step", "Lose Control"
2	Natasha Bedingfield ^{[L]}^{[M]}	4	"Do They Know It's Christmas?", "Unwritten"
2	The Pussycat Dolls	14	"Don't Cha", "Stickwitu"
2	Simon Webbe	8	"Lay Your Hands", "No Worries"
2	Usher ^{[U]}	2	"Caught Up", "Lovers and Friends"
2	Westlife	10	"You Raise Me Up", "When You Tell Me That You Love Me"
2	Will Young ^{[L]}^{[M]}	4	"Do They Know It's Christmas?", "Switch It On"

== Notes ==
- ^{a} "Tilt Ya Head Back" re-entered the top 10 at number 9 on 8 January 2005 (week ending).
- ^{b} Released as a charity single by Band Aid 20 to aid the Darfur region in Sudan.
- ^{c} Elvis Presley's 18 UK number-one singles were re-released each week, some as double A-sides, throughout 2005. 17 of them entered the UK Singles Chart, all making the top five, with three of them reaching number-one.
- ^{d} Released in support of victims of the 2004 Asian tsunami.
- ^{e} Released as an official single for Comic Relief.
- ^{f} The JXL remix originally reached number-one in 2002.
- ^{g} Ying Yang Twins are credited as featured artist on "Get Low". Usher and Ludacris are credited for "Lovers and Friends".
- ^{h} "Jacques Your Body (Make Me Sweat)" was originally released in 1997 and then again in 1999. It was used in an advert for Citroën C4 in 2005 and subsequently released as a single.
- ^{i} Released as the official single for Children in Need.
- ^{j} "Ugly" re-entered the top 10 at number 8 on 7 January 2006 (week ending), rising to number 7 the following week.
- ^{k} Figure includes appearances on The Game's "Hate It or Love It" and "How We Do".
- ^{l} Figure includes song that peaked in 2004.
- ^{m} Figure includes an appearance on the "Do They Know It's Christmas?" charity single by Band Aid 20.
- ^{n} Figure includes three top 10 singles with the group U2.
- ^{o} Figure includes song that peaked in 2006.
- ^{p} Figure includes three top 10 hits with the group Coldplay.
- ^{q} Figure includes appearance on Pharrell's "Can I Have It Like That".
- ^{r} Figure includes one top 10 hit with the group British Whale and one top 10 hit with the group The Darkness.
- ^{s} Figure includes appearance on 2Pac's "Ghetto Gospel".
- ^{t} Figure includes appearance on Ciara's "1, 2 Step".
- ^{u} Figure includes credit for featuring on Lil Jon & The East Side Boyz's "Lovers and Friends".
- ^{v} "Fairytale of New York" first charted at its original peak of number 2 for two weeks in 1987. It re-entered the Top 10 on 31 December 2005 (week ending) at number 3.

== See also ==
- 2005 in British music
- List of number-one singles from the 2000s (UK)
