= All the Greatest Hits (McFly album) =

Greatest hits album by McFly
- Released: 5 November 2007
- Recorded: 2003–2007
- Genre: Pop rock, pop punk
- Length: 59:30 (Greatest Hits) / 78:12 (All the Greatest Hits)
- Label: Island
- Producer: Julian Emery, Hugh Padgham, Jason Perry, Steve Power

McFly chronology
Just My Luck (2006)	All the Greatest Hits (2007)	The Greatest Bits: B-Sides & Rarities (2007)

Singles from All the Greatest Hits
- 1. "The Heart Never Lies" Released: 22 October 2007

Professional ratings
Review scores
Source	Rating
AllMusic	4/5 stars
Digital Spy	4/5 stars
stv.tv	3/5 stars

All the Greatest Hits is the first compilation album by English pop rock band McFly. Released on 5 November 2007, two editions of the album were available, one including fourteen tracks, featuring a selection of the group's best singles, and one including twenty-two tracks, including all of the group's singles, plus a couple of B-sides and remixes. There are also three new songs featured on the album: "The Heart Never Lies", "Don't Wake Me Up", and "The Way You Make Me Feel".

The album was certified Gold in the UK and has sold over 500,000 copies worldwide. McFly revealed in the compilation's booklet that it wasn't their idea to release a Greatest Hits album, and that they were still not keen on the idea.

== Track listing ==
Greatest Hits
No.	Title	Album	Length
1.	"Five Colours in Her Hair"	Room on the 3rd Floor
2.	"All About You"	Wonderland
3.	"Star Girl"	Motion in the Ocean
4.	"Obviously"	Room on the 3rd Floor
5.	"The Heart Never Lies"	Previously unreleased
6.	"Please, Please"	Motion in the Ocean
7.	"Room on the 3rd Floor"	Room on the 3rd Floor
8.	"Don't Stop Me Now"	Single release only
9.	"I'll Be OK"	Wonderland
10.	"That Girl"	Room on the 3rd Floor
11.	"Baby's Coming Back"	Single release only
12.	"Transylvania"	Motion in the Ocean
13.	"The Way You Make Me Feel"	Previously unreleased
14.	"Don't Wake Me Up"	Previously unreleased

All The Greatest Hits
No.	Title	Length
1.	"Five Colours in Her Hair"
2.	"Obviously"
3.	"That Girl"
4.	"Room on the 3rd Floor"
5.	"All About You"
6.	"I'll Be OK"
7.	"I Wanna Hold You"
8.	"The Ballad of Paul K"
9.	"Ultraviolet"
10.	"Please, Please"
11.	"Don't Stop Me Now"
12.	"Star Girl"
13.	"Friday Night"
14.	"Sorry's Not Good Enough"
15.	"Transylvania"
16.	"Baby's Coming Back"
17.	"The Heart Never Lies"
18.	"The Way You Make Me Feel"
19.	"Don't Wake Me Up"
20.	"Five Colours in Her Hair" (U.S. Version)
21.	"You've Got a Friend"
22.	"Memory Lane" (Live at the Manchester Arena 2006)

== Chart performance ==
=== Weekly charts ===
Chart (2007)	Peak position
Irish Albums (IRMA)	20
Japanese Albums (Oricon)	212
Scottish Albums (OCC)	3
South Korean Albums (GAON)	23
UK Albums (OCC)	4

=== Year-end charts ===
Chart (2007)	Position
UK Albums (OCC)	82

== Certifications ==
Region	Certification	Certified units/sales
United Kingdom (BPI)	Platinum	300,000^{^}
^{^} Shipments figures based on certification alone.

== See also ==
- All the Greatest Hits
