= Just My Luck (2006 film) =

2006 film by Donald Petrie

- Theatrical release poster
- Directed by: Donald Petrie
- Screenplay by: I. Marlene King; Amy B. Harris
- Story by: Jonathan Bernstein; Mark Blackwell; James Greer; I. Marlene King
- Produced by: Arnon Milchan; Arnold Rifkin; Donald Petrie
- Starring: Lindsay Lohan; Chris Pine; Faizon Love; Missi Pyle; McFly
- Cinematography: Dean Semler
- Edited by: Debra Neil-Fisher
- Music by: Teddy Castellucci
- Production companies: Regency Enterprises; New Regency; Cheyenne Enterprises
- Distributed by: 20th Century Fox
- Release date: May 12, 2006 (United States)
- Running time: 103 minutes
- Country: United States
- Language: English
- Budget: $28 million
- Box office: $38.2 million

Just My Luck is a 2006 American romantic comedy film directed by Donald Petrie, from a screenplay by I. Marlene King and Amy B. Harris, starring Lindsay Lohan, Chris Pine, Faizon Love, Missi Pyle, and McFly. It tells the story of Ashley Albright who works in public relations and is the luckiest person in Manhattan, while Jake Hardin is a janitor and would-be music producer who seems to have terrible luck until their good and bad luck is switched upon kissing each other at a masquerade ball which changes both their lives and leads them to meet each other once again.

The 2019 Thai television series One Night Steal was based on the film.

== Plot ==
In New York, Ashley Albright works at Braden & Co. Public Relations and has experienced good fortune since childhood. In contrast, Jake Hardin experiences bad luck on a daily basis.

Jake is the unpaid US manager of the British band McFly. For weeks, he tries to get their demo CD to record label owner Damon Philips, hoping to get them discovered and become a music producer. After another failed attempt gets him arrested due to a misunderstanding, Jake sneaks into a masquerade ball put on by Ashley where he hopes to meet Phillips. During the ball, a fortune teller tells Ashley her luck will change. Failing once again to get Phillips' attention, Jake asks Ashley to dance. They kiss, switching their luck in the process.

Outside, Jake saves Phillips from being hit by a car. To repay him for this, he takes the demo and invites the band to his studio. Meanwhile, Ashley and her boss Peggy are arrested because the neighbor she invited, Antonio, to be Peggy's date is a prostitute. She is fired by Peggy and spends a night in jail.

The next day, Ashley learns her apartment is condemned due to flooding and mold. Staying with her friends Dana and Maggie, she experiences more bad luck. Ashley tracks down the fortune teller, who suggests someone needed her luck more. She then realizes the stranger she kissed must have her luck.

Phillips is impressed with McFly and signs them. Meanwhile, Ashley tracks down every male dancer hired to work the ball, kissing them all. After this does nothing to restore her luck, hungry and overwhelmed, Ashley has a public breakdown at a diner where Jake is. Not recognizing her, he sympathizes with her frustration at constant bad luck, offering to find her a job.

Ashley takes Jake's former job at the bowling alley, and they become friends. When Jake is worried McFly does not have enough material for an upcoming gig at the Hard Rock Cafe, she introduces him to singer/songwriter Maggie. Impressed, he decides to use her song.

During a recording session, Ashley overhears Jake say he's been lucky ever since the masquerade ball. Realizing he was the masked dancer, she kisses him and leaves, finding her luck is back. Ashley runs into Peggy, who is now engaged to Antonio and offers to rehire her as the Vice President of Braden & Co. if she helps with a meeting that very night. Ashley then learns Maggie's song will no longer be performed at the concert.

Looking at a mirror she broke earlier, Ashley reflects on the cost of her good luck. Deciding to forego Peggy's meeting, she goes to the concert where Jake and the band are having bad luck and may have to cancel the concert. Ashley kisses Jake and circumstances change, leading to a successful concert where Maggie's song is performed. Realizing she's in love with Jake and that she does not wish to give him bad luck again, Ashley decides to leave the city to stay with her parents for a while.

Jake finds Ashley at Grand Central, realizing she is the woman from the ball. Since he used good luck to help others, she argues she does not want to take it away. Jake points out she experienced good things even with bad luck and says he is willing to experience bad luck again if they are together. They kiss, switching their good and bad luck back and forth.

Katy, a character who knows Jake, arrives and they simultaneously kiss her on each cheek, causing another luck transfer. She then wins a $25 lottery ticket. Jake and Ashley walk hand-in-hand, wondering if they will get used to living without luck and debating karma. Outside, a construction crew accidentally breaks a pipe and water rains down on them.

== Cast ==
- Lindsay Lohan as Ashley Albright
- Chris Pine as Jake Hardin
- McFly as themselves
- Faizon Love as Damon Phillips
- Samaire Armstrong as Maggie Smith
- Bree Turner as Dana Adams
- Missi Pyle as Peggy Braden
- Makenzie Vega as Katy Hardin
- Tovah Feldshuh as Madame Z
- Jaqueline Fleming as Tiffany Richards
- Chris Carmack as David Pennington
- Carlos Ponce as Antonio Cordova
- Dane Rhodes as Mac
- J.C. Sealy as Aunt Marta Hardin

== Production ==
=== Filming ===
Principal photography of interior scenes (such as Ashley's apartment and Jake's apartment) took place in New Orleans, Louisiana before Hurricane Katrina hit the area. In March 2005, exterior scenes were shot in New York City. NYC locations included: the apartment building 43 Fifth Avenue (originally constructed in 1905 by architect Henry Andersen), which has been the home to many celebrities including actresses Julia Roberts and Holly Hunter, novelist Dawn Powell, and screenwriter Noah Baumbach; Christopher Park in Greenwich Village (where Jake offers Ashley a job); the New York Palace Hotel (455 Madison Avenue, where the masquerade ball takes place); Central Park; Rivera Cafe (225 West 4th Street, where Ashley experiences a public outburst); and the Hard Rock Cafe in Times Square, where McFly's concert is supposed to take place. Filming also involved exterior and interior shooting at Grand Central Terminal for the film's final scene. During filming, Lohan sprained her ankle, making it difficult to walk for a time and preventing her from wearing heels.

== Critical reception ==
Critic Roger Ebert wrote that the film was not "for grown-ups, and I don’t much think it’s for teenage boys. But a teenage girl (even better, a pre-teen) might enjoy [it]," and added "I wish it delivered more. It’s safe, competent and bland. I had a fairly monotonous time." A review of the film for the BBC reported that it "takes a yawningly long time for [director] Petrie just to set up the premise," that "despite Lohan's best efforts, Petrie just cannot sustain it for 100 minutes. He slows the story down even more by showcasing pop band McFly [which is] blatant product placement," and that it is "a film full of grating contrivances." Film critic Ella Taylor wrote in The Village Voice that the film was a "lame slice of slapstick" with "excruciating sight gags," and that it "is so unremittingly chipper, you’ll want to shoot it on sight." A review of the film on ReelViews by James Berardinelli described it as a "juvenile romantic comedy fantasy," that "it's hard to imagine how it could be more predictable," that "Lohan is a disappointment" but Pine provides a "winning performance," and "At best, Just My Luck tries for sit-com laughs, and only occasionally gets them."

On the review aggregator website Rotten Tomatoes, 14% of 111 critics' reviews are positive, with an average rating of 3.9/10. The website's consensus reads: "Just My Luck asks little of its leads and less of its audience, adding up to a middling teen rom-com that sorely lacks sparks." Metacritic, which uses a weighted average, assigned the film a score of 29 out of 100, based on 26 critics, indicating "generally unfavorable" reviews. Audiences polled by CinemaScore gave the film an average grade "B" on an A+ to F scale.

=== Box office ===
Just My Luck opened at #4 at the North American box office with $5,692,285 in its opening weekend, May 12, 2006. In the US, it grossed $17,326,650. The film grossed $38 million worldwide.

== Soundtrack ==
Just My Luck

Soundtrack album by McFly
- Released: June 11, 2006
- Genre: Pop rock
- Length: 42:53
- Label: Island
- Producers: Julian Emery, Hugh Padgham, Jason Perry, Steve Power

McFly chronology
Motion in the Ocean (2006)	Just My Luck (2006)	All the Greatest Hits (2007)

The album is made up partly of songs from McFly's first two albums, Room on the 3rd Floor and Wonderland, with the exception of the brand new track "Just My Luck", which was recorded especially for the film. Though released as the film's soundtrack, a selection of the songs featured on the album were not in the film. Reworked versions of "5 Colours in Her Hair", "I've Got You" and "Unsaid Things", as well as the censored Single version of "I Wanna Hold You" appear on the album instead of the original versions. The European version of the album slightly muddles up the track listing, and adds the hidden track "Get Over You" in the pre-gap.

=== Track listing ===
No.	Title	Writer(s)	Length
1.	"I Wanna Hold You" (single version)	Tom Fletcher • Danny Jones • Dougie Poynter	2:59
2.	"I've Got You" (U.S. version)	Fletcher • Jones • Graham Gouldman	3:20
3.	"Obviously"	Fletcher • Jones • James Bourne	3:18
4.	"Ultraviolet"	Fletcher • Jones	3:56
5.	"Five Colours in her Hair" (U.S. version)	Fletcher • Jones • Bourne	3:00
6.	"Too Close for Comfort"	Fletcher • Jones • Poynter	4:37
7.	"All About You"	Fletcher	3:06
8.	"That Girl"	Fletcher • Jones • Bourne	3:17
9.	"Unsaid Things" (U.S. version)	Fletcher • Jones • Bourne • Poynter • Harry Judd	3:45
10.	"I'll Be OK"	Fletcher • Jones • Poynter	3:24
11.	"Just My Luck"	Fletcher • Jones	3:15
12.	"Memory Lane"	Fletcher • Bourne	4:40

Alternate version
No.	Title	Writer(s)	Length
1.	"Five Colours in her Hair" (U.S. version)	Fletcher • Jones • Bourne	3:00
2.	"Obviously"	Fletcher • Jones • Bourne	3:18
3.	"I Wanna Hold You" (single version)	Fletcher • Jones • Poynter	2:59
4.	"I've Got You" (U.S. version)	Fletcher • Jones • Gouldman	3:20
5.	"Ultraviolet"	Fletcher • Jones	3:56
6.	"All About You"	Fletcher • Jones	3:06
7.	"Too Close for Comfort"	Fletcher • Jones • Poynter	4:37
8.	"That Girl"	Fletcher • Jones • Bourne	3:17
9.	"Unsaid Things" (U.S. version)	Fletcher • Jones • Bourne • Poynter • Judd	3:45
10.	"I'll Be OK"	Fletcher • Jones • Poynter	3:24
11.	"Just My Luck"	Fletcher • Jones	3:15
12.	"Memory Lane"	Fletcher • Bourne	4:40

=== Certifications ===
Region	Certification	Certified units/sales
United Kingdom (BPI)	Silver	60,000^{‡}
^{‡} Sales+streaming figures based on certification alone.
