= The Greatest Bits: B-Sides & Rarities =

Compilation album by McFly
- Released: 3 December 2007
- Genres: Pop rock, pop punk
- Length: 37:54
- Label: Island
- Producers: Julian Emery, Hugh Padgham, Jason Perry, Steve Power

McFly chronology
All The Greatest Hits (2007)	The Greatest Bits: B-Sides & Rarities (2007)	Radio:Active (2008)

The Greatest Bits: B-Sides & Rarities is the second compilation album released by the British pop rock band McFly. The album was released on 3 December 2007, and despite being only available at Woolworths stores in the UK, it peaked at No. 83 on the UK Albums Chart. The album has a range of B-sides and covers from the group's singles, as well as a new recording of "Santa Claus is Coming to Town". Physical copies of the album have become quite sought after since the collapse of Woolworths in 2008 although it has since been released on downloads. The cover version of "Pinball Wizard" is a new live version, previously released only as a studio version and a music video.

== Song information ==
- "Mr. Brightside" is a song covered from "The Killers", originally taken from the band's performance in the Radio 1 Live Lounge studio. Dougie Poynter also takes lead vocals. This originally was on the "I Wanna Hold You" single.
- "Lola" was a track which was a B-side on the "5 Colours in Her Hair" single, written by Ray Davies. It features Busted.
- "She Loves You" is a cover of a hit single by The Beatles and it appears on the "That Girl" single.
- "No Worries" is a track dropped from Wonderland, but used on the "I'll Be OK" single.
- "Help!" is another Beatles cover which was a B-side to the "Obviously" single which went to No. 1 in the UK singles chart.
- "Crazy Little Thing Called Love" is a cover of a Queen song, taken from the "Room on the 3rd Floor" single.
- "Santa Claus Is Coming to Town" was recorded after the band performed it on The Paul O'Grady Show in 2007. Poynter sings.
- "The Guy Who Turned Her Down" was a B-Side on the enhanced CD2 single of "5 Colours in Her Hair".
- "Umbrella" is a Rihanna cover which McFly first performed on their Greatest Hits Tour and then a recorded version was placed on "The Heart Never Lies" single, produced by Danny Jones.
- "Pinball Wizard" is a cover of a song by The Who, McFly having collaborated with Roger Daltrey in 2005 on the charity single "My Generation". A studio version appeared on the "I'll Be OK" single, but here the song is performed live.
- "Deck the Halls" was a B-side for the "Room on the 3rd Floor" single, with Fletcher, Poynter and Jones on lead vocals.
- "Fight for Your Right" is a Beastie Boys song which McFly performed first on the Motion in the Ocean Tour, and then the live recording of "Fight for Your Right" was a "Transylvania" B-side. This version is used here.

== Track listing ==
The Greatest Bits: B-Sides & Rarities
No.	Title	Writer(s)	Length
1.	"Mr. Brightside"	Brandon Flowers; Dave Keuning	3:32
2.	"Lola" (Featuring Busted)	Ray Davies	4:14
3.	"She Loves You"	John Lennon; Paul McCartney	2:28
4.	"No Worries"	Tom Fletcher; James Bourne; Charlie Simpson	4:12
5.	"Help"	Lennon; McCartney	2:22
6.	"Crazy Little Thing Called Love"	Freddie Mercury	2:29
7.	"Santa Claus Is Coming To Town"	John Frederick Coots; Haven Gillespie	2:19
8.	"The Guy Who Turned Her Down"	Fletcher; Bourne	3:58
9.	"Umbrella"	Terius Nash; Christopher Stewart; Kuk Harrell; Shawn Carter	4:07
10.	"Pinball Wizard" (Live in Manchester)	Pete Townshend	3:12
11.	"Deck The Halls"	Thomas Oliphant (lyric); unknown (melody)	1:35
12.	"Fight For Your Right" (Live from the Motion in the Ocean Tour)	Adam Yauch; Rick Rubin; Adam Horovitz	3:28
Total length:			37:56
