= All the Greatest Hits (video) =

Video by McFly
- Released: 3 December 2007
- Recorded: Wolverhampton Civic Hall
- Genre: Pop rock
- Label: Universal Music
- Director: Paul Kaslin
- Producer: JJ Stereo

McFly chronology
Motion in the Ocean Tour (2007)	All the Greatest Hits (2007)	Radio:Active – Live at Wembley (2009)

All the Greatest Hits is a music DVD by the pop/rock band McFly. The DVD was filmed during their Greatest Hits Tour in 2007, with the majority of the footage recorded at the Wolverhampton Civic Hall. The DVD was released on 3 December 2007. The DVD also includes all 18 of McFly's Music Videos to date of release except for "Baby's Coming Back", which was dropped for unknown reasons.

== Concert Track listing ==
1. "That Girl"
2. "Friday Night"
3. "Obviously"
4. "Star Girl"
5. "Broccoli"
6. "I Wanna Hold You"
7. "I'll Be OK"
8. "Transylvania"
9. "The Heart Never Lies"
10. "Umbrella"
11. "All About You"
12. "Please Please"
13. "Room on the 3rd Floor"
14. "Don't Stop Me Now"
15. "5 Colours in Her Hair"

=== Music videos ===
1. 5 Colours in Her Hair
2. Obviously
3. That Girl
4. Room on the Third Floor
5. All About You
6. You've Got a Friend
7. I'll Be OK
8. Pinball Wizard
9. I Wanna Hold You
10. Ultraviolet
11. The Ballad of Paul K
12. Please, Please
13. Don't Stop Me Now
14. Star Girl
15. Friday Night
16. Sorry's Not Good Enough
17. Transylvania
18. The Heart Never Lies

==== Notes ====
- "Broccoli" was performed at the three opening shows and the 18 October and 6 December shows at the London Astoria and Wembley Arena, respectively. At all other shows, it was replaced with "Ultraviolet" and "Sorry's Not Good Enough".

== Chart performance ==
Chart	Position
UK	1
Brazil	1

== Tour dates ==
These tour dates are taken from setlist.fm.

Date	City	Country	Venue
27 September	Wolverhampton	England	Civic Hall
29 September	Brighton	England	Brighton Centre
3 October	Croydon	England	Fairfield Halls
13 October	Manchester	England	Manchester Evening News Arena
18 October	London	England	London Astoria
21 October	Nottingham	England	Royal Court Centre
25 October	Brentwood	England	Brentwood Centre
6 November	Brierley Hill	England	Merry Hill Centre
23 November	Manchester	England	Manchester Evening News Arena
24 November	Newcastle	England	Metro Radio Arena
26 November	Glasgow	England	SECC Arena
30 November	Birmingham	England	NEC Arena
1 December	Sheffield	England	Sheffield Arena
5 December	Bournemouth	England	Bournemouth International Centre
6 December	London	England	Wembley Arena
16 December	London	The Big Finish	
