= All the Greatest Hits =

All the Greatest Hits may refer to:

- All the Greatest Hits (McFly album), a 2007 album
- All the Greatest Hits (video), a 2007 music DVD collection by McFly
- All the Greatest Hits (Zapp & Roger album), a 1993 album

== See also ==
- Greatest Hits (disambiguation)
