= Stagga Lee =

American rapper

- Also known as: Stagga Lee
- Born: Eric Newman; July 4, 1975 (age 51); Yonkers, New York, U.S.
- Genres: Hip hop
- Years active: 2002–present
- Labels: ArtistDirect Records, Positiva Records, Casablanca Records
- Website: www.staggalee.com

Eric Newman (born July 4, 1975), better known by his stage name Stagga Lee, is an American rapper and DJ from Yonkers, New York. He began his career playing music at local parties and graduated to spinning records behind some of the biggest names in music during the early 1990s. His stage name was adopted after hearing the classic 1959 No. 1 hit "Stagger Lee" by Lloyd Price.

== Career ==
He signed to Artistdirect in 2004, and had a minor hit in his debut single, "Roll Wit M.V.P. (We Be Like! The La La Song)," which sampled Minnie Riperton's 1975 hit "Lovin' You," and peaked at #13 on the Rhythmic Top 40 in 2003. This began after a buzz was created from the video play the song was receiving on BET's late night video show "Uncut along with making the countdown for 106 & Park. " Following a 28 city promotional tour, his second single, as a featured artist of the Hip-Hop/Dance collective M.V.P., (which also featured Robert Clivilles, Vice Verse and Jasmine Ray), "Roc Ya Body (Mic Check 1 2)", which had a similar sound to the dancehall Diwali Riddim instrumental, was released to radio in 2004, and shot to #1 on the top dance format station in New York City, 103.5 KTU. The exposure from this success allowed him to sign, as part of M.V.P., to Tommy Mottola's Casablanca Records. They parted ways with the label the following year. The song was released in the UK in 2005 on EMI, and quickly spread to other markets around Europe including Germany (#11), Netherlands (#1), and Spain (#4).

Lee was the opening act on the European leg of the Nelly tour from July to August, and the Snoop Dogg tour in September/November, performing at venues such as Wembley Stadium, Manchester Evening News Arena, and Cardiff City Stadium. Live television appearances include Top of the Pops (UK), Ballerman Hitz (Spain), and Popworld (London).

== Discography ==
=== Studio albums ===
- 2003: Stagga Lee Presents M.V.P. (Most Valuable Playas) (MVP featuring Stagga Lee)
- 2004: Game of Breath (unreleased) (Stagga Lee)
- 2006: Hip Hop, Clubs, Girls & Life Vol. 1 (MVP featuring Stagga Lee)

=== Extended plays ===
- 2005: Unreleased (unreleased) (MVP featuring Stagga Lee)

=== Singles ===
- 2004: "Roc Ya Body (Mic Check 1 2)" (MVP featuring Stagga Lee)
- 2004: "Roll wit M.V.P. (We Be Like La La La)" (Stagga Lee featuring Benzino)
- 2005: "Yonkers Shout Out" (Unreleased) (Stagga Lee)
- 2006: "Bounce, Shake, Move, Stop" (MVP featuring Stagga Lee)
- 2006: "What Makes a Great MC" (MVP featuring Stagga Lee)
- 2006: "Lost" (MVP featuring Stagga Lee)
