= Roc Ya Body (Mic Check 1 2) =

2003 single by MVP

Single by MVP featuring Stagga Lee

from the album Stagga Lee presents MVP
- Released: August 4, 2003
- Length: 3:31
- Label: Casablanca
- Songwriters: Robert Clivillés; Eric Newman; Maximino Perez; Victor Matos
- Producer: Robert Clivillés

MVP singles chronology
"Roc Ya Body (Mic Check 1 2)" (2003)	"Bounce, Shake, Move, Stop!" (2006)

"Roc Ya Body (Mic Check 1 2)" is a song by American hip hop group MVP featuring rapper Stagga Lee. Released as their debut single in August 2003, it reached number 82 on the US Billboard Hot 100, becoming the first song issued on Casablanca Records to appear on the Hot 100 since Animotion's "I Want You" in 1986. In 2005, the song was released worldwide, peaking at number five on the UK Singles Chart, number six on the Irish Singles Chart, and number 15 on the Dutch Single Top 100. The group released a follow-up single called "Bounce, Shake, Move, Stop!" in the United Kingdom the following year.

== Music video ==
In the music video, the main singer opens a gate to reveal many scantily clad dancers who then dance around the group.

== Track listings ==
US 12-inch single

A1. "Roc Ya Body 'Mic Check 1,2'" (main mix) – 3:24
B1. "Roc Ya Body 'Mic Check 1,2'" (instrumental) – 3:24
B2. "Roc Ya Body 'Mic Check 1,2'" (acappella) – 3:22

UK CD1

1. "Roc Ya Body 'Mic Check 1,2'" (The MVP radio edit)
2. "Roc Ya Body 'Mic Check 1,2'" (The MVP club mix)
3. "Roc Ya Body 'Mic Check 1,2'" (Robi-Rob's Roc da Jeep vocal mix)
4. "Roc Ya Body 'Mic Check 1,2'" (Robi-Rob's Boriqua Anthem vocal mix)
5. "Roc Ya Body 'Mic Check 1,2'" (DJ Zinc vocal mix)
6. "Roc Ya Body 'Mic Check 1,2'" (Jupiter Ace vocal mix)
7. "Roc Ya Body 'Mic Check 1,2'" (enhanced video)

UK CD2 and European CD single

1. "Roc Ya Body 'Mic Check 1,2'" (The MVP radio edit)
2. Stagga Lee presents MVP – "Hip Hop (Is What I Am)"

UK 12-inch single

A1. "Roc Ya Body 'Mic Check 1,2'" (The MVP club mix)
A2. "Roc Ya Body 'Mic Check 1,2'" (Jupiter Ace vocal mix)
B1. "Roc Ya Body 'Mic Check 1,2'" (DJ Zinc vocal mix)
B2. "Roc Ya Body 'Mic Check 1,2'" (Robi-Rob's Boriqua Anthem vocal mix)

Australian CD single

1. "Roc Ya Body 'Mic Check 1,2'" (The M.V.P. radio edit)
2. "Roc Ya Body 'Mic Check 1,2'" (The M.V.P. club mix)
3. "Roc Ya Body 'Mic Check 1,2'" (Robi-Rob's Roc da Jeep vocal mix)
4. "Roc Ya Body 'Mic Check 1,2'" (Robi-Rob's Boriqua Anthem vocal mix)
5. "Roc Ya Body 'Mic Check 1,2'" (DJ Zinc vocal mix)
6. "Roc Ya Body 'Mic Check 1,2'" (Jupiter Ace vocal mix)

== Charts ==
=== Weekly charts ===
Chart (2003–2006)	Peak position
Australia (ARIA)	70
Australian Urban (ARIA)	27
Belgium (Ultratip Bubbling Under Flanders)	5
Europe (Eurochart Hot 100)	19
Germany (GfK)	31
Greece (IFPI)	16
Hungary (Rádiós Top 40)	27
Hungary (Dance Top 40)	3
Ireland (IRMA)	6
Ireland Dance (IRMA)	1
Netherlands (Dutch Top 40)	24
Netherlands (Single Top 100)	15
Scottish Singles Sales (Official Charts)	7
Switzerland (Schweizer Hitparade)	81
UK Singles (Official Charts)	5
US Billboard Hot 100	82
US Dance Radio Airplay (Billboard)	33
US Rhythmic Top 40 (Billboard)	35

=== Year-end charts ===
Chart (2005)	Position
UK Singles (OCC)	36

== Certifications ==
Region	Certification	Certified units/sales
United Kingdom (BPI)	Silver	200,000^{‡}
^{‡} Sales+streaming figures based on certification alone.

== Release history ==
Region	Date	Format(s)	Label(s)	Ref.
United States	August 4, 2003	Rhythmic contemporary radio	Casablanca	
United Kingdom	June 20, 2005	CD	Positiva	
Australia	August 22, 2005	CD	Positiva	
