= Freefaller (band) =

Freefaller were a British pop/rock band from Newcastle upon Tyne, England, formed in 2001. Their first song, "Do This! Do That!", was released as a single in January 2005, and reached No. 8 in the UK Singles Chart. Their follow-up singles "Good Enough for You" and "She's My Everything" charted at No. 21 and No. 36 respectively in the UK.

== Band members ==
The band were:

- David "Ollie" Oliver (ex-Point Break) – vocals
- Dean Roberts – guitar
- Gary Mahon – bass
- Rich Joy – drums

Roberts has since gone on to form his own band, My[iQ], as well as playing for singer-songwriter Stewart Mac. The later supported Bon Jovi at Twickenham Stadium on 27 June 2008, featuring Roberts on lead guitar and backing vocals. As of 2016 Roberts is a permanent guitarist and songwriting partner of Stewart Mac, releasing material and touring as a duo or with a full band. Drummer Rich Joy is a member of an entertainment based charity organization, the Grand Order of Water Rats. Mahon is now a member of a group called Columbia. Ollie is now a sports lecturer at South Essex College.
