= One World Project =

Musical supergroup

One World Project was a musical supergroup which recorded a song for the 2004 Asian tsunami relief effort. It featured Russell Watson, Boy George, Steve Winwood, Barry Gibb, Brian Wilson, Cliff Richard, Dewey Bunnell, Gerry Beckley and Robin Gibb on vocals (in order of vocal appearance) with Jeffrey Foskett and Randell Kirsch singing harmony vocals. The others musicians and celebrities on the recording were Rick Wakeman, Kenney Jones, Gary Moore (guitar solo), Bill Wyman, Hank Linderman, Jon Anderson, Celina Cherry and Mike Read. It was accompanied by the National Children's Orchestra who were delighted to be asked to be involved in the project at only a week's notice.

The song, titled "Grief Never Grows Old", was recorded in January 2005 and released in February 2005, reaching #4 on the UK Singles Chart.
