= Grief Never Grows Old =

Single by One World Project
- Released: 24 January 2005
- Recorded: January 2005
- Genre: Pop rock
- Length: 5:07
- Label: Active Media
- Songwriter(s): Mike Read

"Grief Never Grows Old" is a song written by Mike Read and recorded by the music supergroup One World Project in 2005 to raise money for relief from the 2004 Indian Ocean earthquake and tsunami in Asia. It was released on 24 January 2005 and reached a peak position of number 4 on the UK Singles Chart.

== Background ==
The musicians who sang in the song were Gerry Beckley, Dewey Bunnell, Jeffrey Foskett, Boy George, Barry Gibb, Robin Gibb, Randell Kirsch, Cliff Richard, Russell Watson, Brian Wilson, and Steve Winwood. Other musicians and celebrities on the record were Jon Anderson, Celina Cherry, Kenney Jones, Hank Linderman, Gary Moore, Mike Read, Rick Wakeman, and Bill Wyman.

The song was produced by Steve Levine.

The musical director was Darren Sell.
