= MVP (group) =

American hip hop group

MVP (short for "Most Valuable Playas") was an American hip-hop group from New York City. The lineup consisted of R&B singer Vice Verse (a.k.a. Victor Matos), MC Stagga Lee (a.k.a. Eric Newman), and Robert Clivillés (a.k.a. Rob Dinero/Rich Kid).

The group released two albums: Stagga Lee presents MVP in 2003 (with additional members Mighty Max, Jasmine Ray, J.R.X.L., and Fatts Bronston) and Hip Hop, Clubs, Girls & Life Vol. 1 in 2006. Their debut single, "Roc Ya Body (Mic Check 1 2)", was a hit in Europe, reaching no. 5 on the UK Singles Chart in July 2005. "Bounce, Shake, Move, Stop!" was the second single, which attained no. 22 on the UK Singles Chart and No. 43 on the Irish Singles Chart in 2006. The group released no further singles.
