= The Wonderland Tour 2005 =

Video by McFly
- Released: 28 November 2005
- Recorded: Manchester Arena
- Genre: Pop rock
- Length: 110 minutes
- Director: Dick Carruthers
- Producer: Steve Power

McFly chronology
| The Wonderland Tour 2005 (2005) | Motion in the Ocean Tour (2007) |

The Wonderland Tour 2005 is a concert DVD by the pop/rock band McFly. The DVD was filmed during their first arena tour, Wonderland. The majority of concert footage was filmed at the Manchester Arena concert.

== The tour ==
This tour had a few special arrangements. In "Ultraviolet", the whole of the arena's lights went an ultraviolet colour. During the 6th song, "That Girl", a giant pair of female legs came on the stage where McFly were playing. Also, in this tour, McFly had a 60 piece Orchestra with them. Fire was also used for parts of "I Wanna Hold You". McFly covered a snippet of American pop punk band Green Day's hit "American Idiot" and played a full cover song by The Who with whom they had previously worked with, playing "Pinball Wizard". This is McFly's first arena tour, their previous tour being a theatre tour.

== Track listing ==
1. "Intro"
2. "I've Got You"
3. "Nothing"
4. "Obviously"
5. "Ultraviolet"
6. "Too Close For Comfort"
7. "That Girl"
8. "Diarrhoea" (unlisted)
9. "Silence is a Scary Sound"
10. "She Falls Asleep"
11. "Unsaid Things"
12. "The Ballad of Paul K"
13. "Don't Know Why"
14. "Five Colours in Her Hair"
15. "Pinball Wizard"
16. "Room on the 3rd Floor"
17. "Memory Lane"
18. "I'll Be OK"
19. "All About You"
20. "I Wanna Hold You"

=== Notes ===
- The live version of "Silence is a Scary Sound" included was later featured as a hidden track on their next album Motion in the Ocean.
- The DVD charted No. 1 in UK video music charts.
- A short song called "Diarrhoea" was also performed on the tour, but not specifically titled on the DVD. It appears in between "That Girl" and "Silence is a Scary Sound".
- "Diarrhoea" and "That Girl" were not performed in Birmingham and Sheffield.

== Tour dates ==
These tour dates are taken from setlist.fm.

| Date | City | Country | Venue |
|---|---|---|---|
| 15 September | Birmingham | England | NEC Arena |
| 17 September | Birmingham | England | NEC Arena |
| 18 September | Birmingham | England | NEC Arena |
| 20 September | Sheffield | England | Hallam FM Arena |
| 21 September | Sheffield | England | Hallam FM Arena |
| 23 September | Manchester | England | Manchester Evening News Arena |
| 24 September | Manchester | England | Manchester Evening News Arena |
| 25 September | Newcastle | England | Metro Radio Arena |
| 27 September | Nottingham | England | Nottingham Arena |
| 30 September | London | England | Wembley Arena Pavilion |
| 1 October | London | England | Wembley Arena Pavilion |
| 2 October | London | England | Wembley Arena Pavilion |
| 4 October | Glasgow | Scotland | Scottish Exhibition and Conference Centre |
| 5 October | Glasgow | Scotland | Scottish Exhibition and Conference Centre |
| 6 October | Glasgow | Scotland | Scottish Exhibition and Conference Centre |
| 8 October | Dublin | Ireland | Point Theatre |
| 9 October | Belfast | Northern Ireland | Odyssey Arena |
| 11 October | Cardiff | Wales | Cardiff International Arena |
| 12 October | Nottingham | England | Nottingham Arena |
