= 5 Colours in Her Hair =

2004 single by McFly

Single by McFly

from the album Room on the 3rd Floor
- B-side: "Lola"
- Released: 29 March 2004
- Length: 2:58
- Label: Island; Universal
- Songwriters: Tom Fletcher; James Bourne; Danny Jones; Ben Sargeant
- Producer: Craig Hardy

McFly singles chronology
"5 Colours in Her Hair" (2004)	"Obviously" (2004)

Music video
- "5 Colours in Her Hair" on YouTube

"5 Colours in Her Hair" is a song by English pop rock band McFly, released on 29 March 2004 as both their debut single and the lead single from their debut album, Room on the 3rd Floor. Written by Tom Fletcher, James Bourne, Danny Jones and Ben Sargeant, the track is well known for its "Doo, doo, doo, doo, doo, doo!" lyrics at both the beginning and the ending of the song, with the music itself being indebted to 1960s surf and beat music, and was inspired by Susan Lee, a character played by actress Emily Corrie in the TV series As If, who wore coloured dreadlocks. The CD and 7-inch formats feature a duet with Busted singing a cover of the Kinks song "Lola".

The track debuted atop the UK Singles Chart on 4 April 2004, becoming the band's first number-one single, and stayed at the top for two weeks. Overall, it spent 12 weeks on the chart and also reached number seven in Ireland. The song was also nominated for The Record of the Year in 2004 but finished in second place just one point behind the winner, "Thunderbirds" / 3AM by Busted.

== Music video ==
McFly shot the video for "5 Colours in Her Hair" just after Christmas 2003. Simon Amstell recorded an interview and footage behind the scenes for Channel 4 music show, Popworld. The video, shot in front of a green screen, begins by comically introducing the band members, getting Danny's and Dougie's names wrong. It also features the band messing around at various different scenes, but telling the overall main story about a "girl with 5 colours in her hair" (played by Molly Portsmouth), who miserably lives in a black and white world. She then follows them into the TV where she joins the band in a club setting where the band are playing to a crowd. They also shoot various well known scenes as a tribute to their main influences including the Beatles and the Beach Boys.

== US version ==
A rerecorded pop punk version of the song, with minor lyrical alterations, appeared on the soundtrack to the 2006 film Just My Luck, which was also McFly's debut album in the US. The song was included on the "Please, Please" single release in the UK, as well as on the All the Greatest Hits deluxe fan edition. It would go on to be the default way they would perform the song live.

== Track listings ==
UK CD1
No.	Title	Writer(s)	Length
1.	"5 Colours in Her Hair"	Tom Fletcher; James Bourne; Danny Jones; Ben Sargeant	2:58
2.	"Lola" (featuring Busted)	Ray Davies	4:14

UK CD2
No.	Title	Writer(s)	Length
1.	"5 Colours in Her Hair"	Fletcher; Bourne; Jones; Sargeant	2:58
2.	"Saturday Nite"	Fletcher; Jones; Dougie Poynter; Harry Judd	2:47
3.	"The Guy Who Turned Her Down"	Fletcher; Bourne	3:58
4.	"5 Colours in Her Hair" (video)	Fletcher; Bourne; Jones; Sargeant

UK 7-inch picture disc
No.	Title	Writer(s)	Length
1.	"5 Colours in Her Hair"	Fletcher; Bourne; Jones; Sargeant	2:58
2.	"Lola" (featuring Busted)	Davies	4:14

Japanese CD single
No.	Title	Writer(s)	Length
1.	"5 Colours in Her Hair"	Fletcher; Bourne; Jones; Sargeant	2:58
2.	"Lola" (featuring Busted)	Davies	4:14
3.	"The Guy Who Turned Her Down"	Fletcher; Bourne	3:58

== Charts ==
=== Weekly charts ===
Chart (2004)	Peak position
Europe (Eurochart Hot 100)	5
Ireland (IRMA)	7
Scotland Singles (OCC)	1
UK Singles (OCC)	1
UK Airplay (Music Week)	35

=== Year-end charts ===
Chart (2004)	Position
UK Singles (OCC)	32

== Certifications ==
Region	Certification	Certified units/sales
United Kingdom (BPI)	Gold	400,000^{‡}
^{‡} Sales+streaming figures based on certification alone.

== Release history ==
Region	Date	Format(s)	Label(s)	Ref.
United Kingdom	29 March 2004	7-inch vinyl; CD	Island; Universal	
Japan	7 July 2004	CD	Island; Universal	
