= Wonderland (McFly album) =

Studio album by McFly
- Released: 29 August 2005
- Recorded: September 2004–July 2005, London, England, United Kingdom
- Genres: Pop rock; baroque pop
- Length: 43:29
- Label: Island
- Producers: Hugh Padgham, Steve Power

McFly chronology
Room on the 3rd Floor (2004)	Wonderland (2005)	Motion in the Ocean (2006)

Singles from Wonderland
- 1. "All About You" Released: 7 March 2005; 2. "I'll Be OK" Released: 15 August 2005; 3. "I Wanna Hold You" Released: 17 October 2005; 4. "Ultraviolet / The Ballad of Paul K" Released: 12 December 2005

Professional ratings
Review scores
Source	Rating
AllMusic	3.5/5 stars
Cokemachineglow	19%
The Guardian	3/5 stars
The Observer	3/5 stars

Wonderland is the second studio album by English pop rock band McFly. It was released in the United Kingdom on 29 August 2005, and was a success, being certified platinum, selling over 300,000 copies in the UK peaking at number 1 in the UK Albums Chart breaking the world record for the youngest band to top the album chart twice. Despite being less of a success in the UK, the album went on to match the worldwide sales of McFly's debut album Room on the 3rd Floor, selling over one million copies.

== Background ==
The album contains production from early collaborator Hugh Padgham, who co-produced the majority of the band's debut album, as well as production from former Busted producer Steve Power. The album follows more of a story-like narrative than the band's first album, and adopts a slightly more advanced style of pop. Unlike the band's first album, there is no hidden track on the album. Four singles were released from the album: "All About You", which was released as the official Comic Relief single for 2005, "I'll Be OK", "I Wanna Hold You" and the double A-side of "Ultraviolet and The Ballad of Paul K". A deluxe version of the album was released in special gatefold packaging, with fold-out photos of the band as well as an extended booklet. The Japanese edition of the album contains two additional tracks plus two music videos.

== Critical reception ==
Sharon Mawer of AllMusic said of the album: "The often difficult second album was made to look easy by McFly, the four lads from London who saw Busted, their main rivals for the affections of pre-teenage hearts, split up in 2005, leaving them the only guitar-based pop band in town, and McFly did not disappoint their army of fans with Wonderland. At the time of release, it already contained two number one singles, "I'll Be OK" and the Comic Relief charity hit "All About You," although the Carly Simon/James Taylor B-side, track two on the CD single, "You've Got a Friend" was not included. The same mixture of good, fun 1960s-influenced pop songs and mid-tempo ballads is here, as on the debut album Room on the 3rd Floor, the opening track, "I'll Be OK," being a good example of a boy band trying to sound as little like a boy band as possible with real instruments, mainly guitars that, if you really stretched your imagination, on the intro could be compared to the Who's "Won't Get Fooled Again," although it only lasted about fifteen seconds. The boys even felt confident enough to include a sitar on the song "Ultraviolet," which became their least successful single release to date. The turning point of the album came about halfway through - on vinyl it would have been side two - with the "All About You" track, which opened with an orchestral piece and then continued throughout the song with a strummed acoustic guitar and even had a woodwind instrumental break. And of course, there was quite a memorable song in there as well. This theme was expanded even further on the two-part track "She Falls Asleep"—part one a dreamy instrumental heavy on the orchestral string section; part two a sophisticated ballad, quite dramatic in its production—and the album concluded as it began, with more guitar-led harmony pop with the songs "Nothing" and "Memory Lane". One might sneer, but Wonderland was a good album from an obviously talented group of young lads."

== Track listing ==
Standard edition
No.	Title	Writer(s)	Producer(s)	Length
1.	"I'll Be OK"	Tom Fletcher; Danny Jones; Dougie Poynter	Hugh Padgham	3:24
2.	"I've Got You"	Fletcher; Jones; Graham Gouldman	Hugh Padgham, Graham Gouldman	3:18
3.	"Ultraviolet"	Fletcher; Jones	Steve Power	3:56
4.	"The Ballad of Paul K"	Fletcher; Jones; Poynter	Hugh Padgham	3:17
5.	"I Wanna Hold You"	Fletcher; Jones; Poynter	Hugh Padgham	2:59
6.	"Too Close for Comfort"	Fletcher; Jones; Poynter	Hugh Padgham	4:37
7.	"All About You"	Fletcher	Hugh Padgham	3:06
8.	"She Falls Asleep - Part 1"	Fletcher	Hugh Padgham	1:43
9.	"She Falls Asleep - Part 2"	Fletcher	Hugh Padgham	4:11
10.	"Don't Know Why"	Jones	Steve Power	4:20
11.	"Nothing"	Fletcher	Steve Power	3:50
12.	"Memory Lane"	Fletcher; James Bourne	Hugh Padgham	4:40
Total length:				43:29

Japanese edition bonus tracks
No.	Title	Writer(s)	Producer(s)	Length
13.	"Easy Way Out"	Fletcher, Jones, Poynter	Hugh Padgham	3:15
14.	"I'll Be OK" (Tom and Danny's Acoustic version)	Fletcher, Jones, Poynter	Fletcher, Jones	3:37
15.	"Ultraviolet" (music video)			3:56
16.	"I'll Be OK" (music video)			3:24

B-sides and rarities
No.	Title	Length
1.	"You've Got a Friend"	4:27
2.	"Room on the Third Floor" (Orchestral version)	3:16
3.	"All About You" (Orchestral version)	3:05
4.	"No Worries"	4:10
5.	"Nothing" (demo)	3:05
6.	"Pinball Wizard"	3:27
7.	"Mr. Brightside"	3:14
8.	"I Wanna Hold You" (instrumental)	2:59
9.	"The Ballad of Paul K" (orchestral version)	3:15
10.	"Ultraviolet" (live version)	4:24
11.	"I Predict a Riot" (BBC Radio 1 Live Lounge)	3:30
12.	"My Generation" (with Roger Daltrey)	3:42
13.	"I'll Be Ok" (Dougie Version)	3:23

== Charts ==
Chart (2005)	Peak Position
European Albums Chart	9
Irish Albums (IRMA)	11
Japanese Albums (Oricon)	61
Scottish Albums (OCC)	1
South Korea Albums (GAON)	70
UK Albums (Official Charts)	1

=== Year-end charts ===
Chart (2005)	Position
UK Albums (OCC)	70

== Certifications ==
Certifications for Wonderland
Region	Certification	Certified units/sales
United Kingdom (BPI)	Platinum	300,000^{^}
^{^} Shipments figures based on certification alone.

== See also ==
- The Wonderland Tour 2005
