= Ultraviolet / The Ballad of Paul K =

Single by McFly

"Ultraviolet" / "The Ballad of Paul K"
- CD1 single

Single by McFly

from the album Wonderland
- B-side: "I Predict a Riot" (live)
- Released: 12 December 2005
- Length: 4:00 ("Ultraviolet"); 3:18 ("Ballad")
- Label: Island; Universal
- Songwriters: Tom Fletcher, Danny Jones ("Ultraviolet"); Tom Fletcher, Danny Jones, Dougie Poynter ("Ballad")
- Producers: Hugh Padgham ("Ultraviolet"); Steve Power ("Ballad")

McFly singles chronology
"I Wanna Hold You" (2005)	"Ultraviolet" / "The Ballad of Paul K" (2005)	"Don't Stop Me Now" / "Please, Please" (2006)

Music video
- "Ultraviolet on YouTube

Audio
- "The Ballad of Paul K" on YouTube

"Ultraviolet" and "The Ballad of Paul K" are two songs by British pop rock band McFly. They were released as a double A-side single on 12 December 2005, serving as the fourth single from the band's second studio album, Wonderland (2005). The single peaked at No. 9 on the UK Singles Chart (their first not to reach the top five) and No. 25 on the Irish Singles Chart

== Song information ==
Both tracks were written by McFly members Tom Fletcher and Danny Jones, with "The Ballad of Paul K" being written also by Dougie Poynter, who was the principal writer. The Ballad of Paul K was based on the members of McFly's fathers. The song is about a middle-aged man coming to terms with his life. The song "Ultraviolet" was initially called "Summer Girls".

== Music videos ==
The "Ultraviolet" video was simply a montage of clips filmed at Live at McFly's Wonderland Tour 2005, Manchester and Behind the Scenes of their first Arena tour. The Ballad of Paul K video was a little different. The video uses a blend of live action and animation. It is often considered to be in the style of Tim Burton movies, especially The Nightmare Before Christmas and Corpse Bride. In a TV interview, McFly admitted that watching the video now does scare them slightly.

== Track listings ==
UK CD1
No.	Title	Writer(s)	Length
1.	"The Ballad of Paul K"	Danny Jones, Dougie Poynter, Tom Fletcher	3:18
2.	"Ultraviolet" (live version)	Jones, Fletcher	4:31
Total length:			7:49

UK CD 2
No.	Title	Writer(s)	Length
1.	"The Ballad of Paul K" (orchestral version)	Jones, Poynter, Fletcher	3:18
2.	"Ultraviolet"	Jones, Fletcher	4:00
3.	"I Predict a Riot" (live from Radio 1 Live Lounge)	Nick Hodgson, Rick Wilson, Andrew White, Simon Rix, Nicholas M. Baines	3:09
4.	"Ultraviolet" (video)	Jones, Fletcher	3:55
Total length:			14:22

UK DVD single
No.	Title	Writer(s)	Length
1.	"The Ballad of Paul K"	Jones, Poynter, Fletcher	3:17
2.	"Ultraviolet"	Jones, Fletcher	3:55
3.	"The Ballad of Paul K" (video)	Jones, Poynter, Fletcher	3:24
4.	"Home Video" (video)		7:10
5.	"Out-Takes" (video)		1:54
Total length:			19:40

== Charts ==
Chart (2005)	Peak position
Ireland (IRMA)	25
Scottish Singles Sales (Official Charts)	7
UK Singles (Official Charts)	9
