= All About You / You've Got a Friend =

2005 single by McFly

"All About You" / "You've Got a Friend"

Single by McFly
- B-side: "Room on the 3rd Floor"
- Released: 7 March 2005
- Length: 3:07 ("All About You"); 4:38 ("You've Got a Friend")
- Label: Island; Universal
- Songwriters: Tom Fletcher ("All About You"); Carole King ("You've Got a Friend")
- Producer: Hugh Padgham

McFly singles chronology
"Room on the 3rd Floor" (2004)	"All About You" / "You've Got a Friend" (2005)	"I'll Be OK" (2005)

"All About You" and "You've Got a Friend" are two songs by English pop rock band McFly, issued as the band's first double A-side single. The former song is an original McFly track while the latter is a cover of the 1971 song written by Carole King. The single was released on 7 March 2005 as the official Comic Relief charity single for 2005, with all royalties being donated to the charity. "All About You" was later included on the band's second studio album, Wonderland (2005).

The single peaked at number one on the UK Singles Chart as well as in Ireland. Having sold and streamed over 1.2 million units in the UK, "All About You" received a double platinum sales status certification from the British Phonographic Industry (BPI). "All About You" was nominated for the Record of the Year in 2005.

== Song information ==
The song was written by Tom Fletcher for his then-girlfriend, and now wife, Giovanna Fletcher, as a gift for Valentine's Day as a result of him forgetting the actual day. It is the lead A-side single, and the first of McFly's singles to feature an orchestra, conducted by Simon Hale and the string leader, Gavin Wright. The second track on the double A-side was "You've Got a Friend", written and originally recorded by Carole King.

== Chart performance ==
"All About You" debuted at number one on the UK Singles Chart, giving McFly their third UK number-one single, as well as their fifth top-five hit in less than a year. It debuted at number one, only to be knocked off the top spot the following week by the unofficial Comic Relief single "Is This the Way to Amarillo", by Tony Christie and (mimed by) Peter Kay.

== Music videos ==
The video for "All About You" was filmed on 14 January 2005, the same day good friends Busted announced their break-up. In the video, Harry Judd tries to get into the studio where the rest of McFly are in progress recording the song, but a security guard outside refuses to let him in, until Harry sneaks in by distracting the guard with Smash Hits magazines all with Busted on the front cover (of whom a badge announced him to be a fan). The song is stopped halfway when a cleaner unplugs the equipment to plug in a vacuum, Harry then arrives, the song starts again and the recording is finished. The comedic video features a number of British celebrities including Fearne Cotton, Johnny Vegas, Davina McCall, Ben Miles, Lee Hurst, Graham Norton, Dermot O'Leary, Simon Amstell, Ruby Wax as the cleaner, Kate Thornton, Harry Hill as the security guard, and violinist Johanna McWeeney-Oxer.

"You've Got a Friend" was shot on location in Uganda. The boys spent a week there in January 2005 for Comic Relief. The video sees McFly with the children of Uganda, playing with them, performing for them, and teaching them to sing. Towards the end of the video, McFly's vocals are removed for a chorus sung by the children.

== Track listing ==
UK CD single

1. "All About You"
2. "You've Got a Friend"
3. "Room on the 3rd Floor"
4. "All About You" (orchestral version)
5. "All About You" (video)

== Charts ==
=== Weekly charts ===
Chart (2005)	Peak position
Europe (European Hot 100)	2
Iceland (Íslenski listinn)	8
Ireland (IRMA)	1
Scottish Singles Sales (Official Charts)	1
UK Singles (Official Charts)	1
UK Airplay (Music Week)	2

Chart (2010)	Peak position
South Korea (GAON)	64

=== Year-end charts ===
Chart (2005)	Position
UK Singles (OCC)	6
UK Airplay (Music Week)	67

== Certifications ==
Region	Certification	Certified units/sales
United Kingdom (BPI)	2× Platinum	1,200,000^{‡}
^{‡} Sales+streaming figures based on certification alone.
