= I'll Be OK =

2005 single by McFly

- CD1 single

Single by McFly

from the album Wonderland
- B-side: "No Worries"; "Nothing"; "Pinball Wizard"
- Released: 15 August 2005
- Length: 3:22
- Label: Island; Universal
- Songwriters: Tom Fletcher; Danny Jones; Dougie Poynter
- Producer: Hugh Padgham

McFly singles chronology
"All About You" / "You've Got a Friend" (2005)	"I'll Be OK" (2005)	"I Wanna Hold You" (2005)

"I'll Be OK" is a song by English pop rock band McFly. It was released on 15 August 2005 as the second single from their second studio album, Wonderland (2005). The single became the group's fourth number-one single on the UK Singles Chart. Despite its initial popularity, it plunged to number eight during its second week on the chart and spent only a month inside the UK top 40.

== Background ==
The song was written by band members Tom Fletcher, Dougie Poynter and Danny Jones. The single started its life out as two tracks, one written by Jones and the other by Fletcher and then by placing their "best" parts of their songs together, they had written I'll Be OK. In an interview, Tom Fletcher stated "It gives people a positive message, by saying that you should always reassure yourself, even when things do go wrong". The single also includes a new track—"No Worries"—written by former Busted members Charlie Simpson and James Bourne.

The opening of the song is similar to the opening "Won't Get Fooled Again" by the Who, who McFly were influenced by at the time. Another of The Who's songs, "Pinball Wizard", was also covered by McFly for an "I'll Be OK" B-side.

== Music video ==
The music video features the band in various situations that are considered bad, sometimes following along with the lyrics. The video also shows the band on a rooftop playing their instruments. The video is said to have taken inspiration from the 2004 song "The Love of Richard Nixon" by Manic Street Preachers.

== Track listings ==
UK CD1

1. "I'll Be OK"
2. "No Worries"

UK CD2

1. "I'll Be OK"
2. "Nothing"
3. "Pinball Wizard"
4. "I'll Be OK" (video)

UK DVD single

1. "I'll Be OK" (audio)
2. "All About You" (audio)
3. "Pinball Wizard" (home video)
4. "All About You" (video)
5. "Home Footage"

== Charts ==
=== Weekly charts ===
Chart (2005)	Peak position
Europe (Eurochart Hot 100)	6
Ireland (IRMA)	8
Scottish Singles Sales (Official Charts)	1
UK Singles (Official Charts)	1
UK Airplay (Music Week)	19

=== Year-end charts ===
Chart (2005)	Position
UK Singles (OCC)	52
