= I Wanna Hold You =

Single by McFly

- CD1 single

Single by McFly

from the album Wonderland
- B-side: "Mr. Brightside"; "Easy Way Out"
- Released: 17 October 2005
- Length: 2:59
- Label: Island; Universal
- Songwriters: Tom Fletcher; Danny Jones; Dougie Poynter
- Producer: Hugh Padgham

McFly singles chronology
"I'll Be OK" (2005)	"I Wanna Hold You" (2005)	"Ultraviolet" / "The Ballad of Paul K" (2005)

"I Wanna Hold You" is a song by English pop rock band McFly. It was released on 17 October 2005 as the third single from their second studio album, Wonderland (2005). It was written by band members Tom Fletcher, Danny Jones, and Dougie Poynter. The song peaked at number three in the UK Singles Chart and number 13 in Ireland.

== Alterations to the lyric ==
The original version of the song was different from the final album and single releases, this version was written by Tom Fletcher and Danny Jones. Its lyrics were later deemed to be "less mature" and resembled a song more suited to the Room on the 3rd Floor album than the new and "grown-up" Wonderland album. The lyric was therefore edited for the final cut of Wonderland. It was re-written by Fletcher, Jones and Dougie Poynter and re-recorded, but not before the original was featured on the album demo which had subsequently been spread across the internet. The new album version however, was again altered by all four members of the band for the single release in which the lines "I'd destroy the world for you", "Every city's burning to the ground under your feet" and "It's like a neutron bomb explosion" were rephrased to "I'll change the world for you", "Cities still surrender and they're falling at your feet" and "You keep ballooning like the ocean" respectively. Subsequent live performances of the song feature a compromise in which the lines "I'll destroy the world for you", "Cities still surrender and they're falling at your feet" and "It's like a neutron bomb explosion" are used.

== Music video ==
McFly's video for "I Wanna Hold You" is more mature, removing McFly's signature comedic sketches for a serious performance-based video. The band, suited up, perform the whole video in front of an orchestra of beautiful women in blonde wigs. During the guitar solo, a woman appears to rise through the ground before McFly, dripping with a metallic looking paint.

== Track listings ==
UK CD1

1. "I Wanna Hold You"
2. "Mr. Brightside"

UK CD2

1. "I Wanna Hold You"
2. "Easy Way Out"
3. "Interview – Tom Fletcher interviews Danny Jones"
4. "I Wanna Hold You" (instrumental)

UK DVD single

1. "I Wanna Hold You" (audio)
2. "New McFly Home Movie"
3. "I Wanna Hold You" (video)

== Charts ==
=== Weekly charts ===
Chart (2005)	Peak position
Europe (Eurochart Hot 100)	12
Ireland (IRMA)	15
Scottish Singles Sales (Official Charts)	3
UK Singles (Official Charts)	3
UK Airplay (Music Week)	40

=== Year-end charts ===
Chart (2005)	Position
UK Singles (OCC)	130
