= James Bourne discography =

- Studio albums: 3
- Live albums: 1
- Compilation albums: 1
- Singles: 12
- Music videos: 13

The discography of James Bourne, an English singer-songwriter. Bourne has released four studio albums as a part of Busted, one album with Son of Dork, one solo album, and has announced a forthcoming solo album - Sugar Beach. Bourne has also released music under the pseudonym Future Boy.

== Albums ==
=== James Bourne ===
Album	Chart position	Release date
Safe Journey Home	–	23 October 2020
Sugar Beach	–	1 July 2022

=== Busted ===
Album	Chart position	Release date
Busted	3	30 September 2002
A Present for Everyone	2	17 November 2003
Busted (US)	–	12 October 2004
A Ticket for Everyone: Busted Live	11	1 November 2004
Night Driver	13	25 November 2016
Half Way There	2	1 February 2019

=== Son of Dork ===
Album	Chart position	Release date
Welcome To Loserville	35	7 November 2005

=== Future Boy ===
Album	Chart position	Release date
Volume 1	–	3 June 2010

=== McBusted ===
Album	Chart position	Release date
McBusted	12	1 December 2014

== Singles ==
=== James Bourne ===
Singles	UK Chart position	Release date	Album
Pigs Can Fly	–	2017	'Non-album Single'
Everyone is My Friend	–	2020	Safe Journey Home
Drive	–	2020	Safe Journey Home
Time Kills Us All	–	2021	Safe Journey Home
Sugar Beach	–	2022	Sugar Beach
Mosquito	–	2022	Sugar Beach
Alone in Paradise	–	2022	Sugar Beach
Samo	–	2022	Sugar Beach
X-Man	–	2022	Sugar Beach
Cross the Worlds	–	2025	Sonic Racing: CrossWorlds

=== Busted ===
Singles	UK Chart position	Release date
What I Go to School For	3	16 September 2002
Year 3000	2	20 January 2003
You Said No	1	21 April 2003
Sleeping with the Light On	3	11 August 2003
Crashed the Wedding	1	10 November 2003
Who's David?	1	16 February 2004
Air Hostess	2	15 June 2004
Thunderbirds/3am	1	26 July 2004
She Wants to Be Me	–	29 November 2004
Coming Home	46	3 May 2016

=== Son of Dork ===
Singles	Chart position	Release date	Album
Ticket Outta Loserville	3	21 November 2005	Welcome To Loserville
Eddie's Song	10	16 January 2006	Welcome To Loserville

== Other artists ==
Artist	Song	Co-writers	Release year
The Vamps	On The Floor	Espen Lind, Amund Bjørklund, James Bourne, James McVey, Tristan Evans, Bradley Simpson, Connor Ball	2014
McFly	My TVR	N/A	2013
Pixie Lott	Everybody Hurts Sometimes	Pixie Lott, Christopher Baran	2011
Backstreet Boys	Don't Try This at Home	Claude Kelly	2009
The Saturdays	Forever Is Over	L. Biancaniello, S. Watters	2009
Better Than Ezra	All In	N/A	2009
Mitchel Musso	Speed Dial	Busbee	2009
AllStar	Journey to the End of My Life	T. Norris, N. Darmody, Z. Porter	2009
Eoghan Quigg	28,000 Friends	Busbee	2009
McFly	"Do Ya"	T. Fletcher, D. Poynter	2008
McFly	Everybody Knows	T. Fletcher, D. Poynter	2008
Boyzone	Can't Stop Thinking About You	S. Mac	2008
Charlotte Perrelli	Appreciate	J. Schulze, S. Kotecha	2008
RipChord	Heartbreaker	P. Wallbank	2008
Britannia High	Best of Me	G. Barlow, G. Go, E. Kennedy	2008
Melanie C	Immune	P. Woodroffe, C. Grant	2007
Swedish Amateurs	Miss Sweden	M. Willis, G. Go, C. Simpson, J. Schulze, A. Carlsson, F. Lampell	2007
Pat Monahan	Great Escape	P. Monahan	2007
William Tell	Yesterday is Calling	P. Smith	2007
McFly	We Are The Young	T. Fletcher, D. Jones, J. Perry	2006
McFly	Lonely	T. Fletcher	2006
Wouter	Miss Sweden	M. Willis, G. Go, C. Simpson, J. Schulze, A. Carlsson, F. Lampell	2005
McFly	Memory Lane	T. Fletcher	2005
McFly	No Worries	C. Simpson, T. Fletcher	2005
Nick Jonas	Appreciate	J. Schulze, S. Kotecha	2005
Jonas Brothers	Year 3000	M. Willis, C. Simpson, S. Robson, J. McLaughlin	2005
Jonas Brothers	What I Go To School For	M. Willis, C. Simpson, S. Robson	2005
Nick Jonas	Appreciate	J. Schulze, S. Kotecha	2004
V	Chills in the Evening	T. Fletcher	2004
McFly	5 Colours in Her Hair	T. Fletcher, D. Jones	2004
McFly	Obviously	T. Fletcher, D. Jones	2004
McFly	That Girl	T. Fletcher	2004
McFly	She Left Me	T. Fletcher	2004
McFly	Down by the Lake	T. Fletcher	2004
McFly	Surfer Babe	T. Fletcher	2004
McFly	The Guy Who Turned Her Down	T. Fletcher	2004
McFly	Broccoli	T. Fletcher	2004
McFly	Unsaid Things	T. Fletcher, D. Jones, D. Poynter, H. Judd	2004
