= Busted discography =

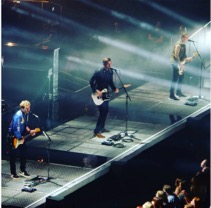
- Busted in Glasgow during their Pigs Can Fly Tour 2016
- Studio albums: 4
- Live albums: 2
- Compilation albums: 2
- Singles: 24
- Music videos: 14

This is a discography of the English pop punk band Busted. It consists of four studio albums, one live album, two compilation albums, twenty-four singles and fourteen music videos.

The band's debut album Busted was released by Island Records in the UK in September 2002 and peaked at number two on the UK Albums Chart and has been certified triple platinum by the British Phonographic Industry. It also peaked at number five on the Irish Albums Chart. The album spawned four singles, "What I Go to School For", "Year 3000", "You Said No" and "Sleeping with the Light On". They all charted in the top three of the UK Singles Chart, with "You Said No" reaching number one and three of them reaching the top five in Ireland.

Busted's second album A Present for Everyone was released in 2003 and spawned four top-two singles in the UK, "Crashed the Wedding", "Who's David", "Air Hostess" and the double A-side "Thunderbirds / 3AM". The album itself peaked at number two in the UK, number nine in Ireland, and was also certified triple platinum by the BPI. This was followed in 2004 by a United States-only album which was again titled Busted. It featured tracks from both of their previous UK albums. In November 2004, Busted released a live album, A Ticket for Everyone: Busted Live, which features live recordings from their 2004 tour.

== Albums ==
=== Studio albums ===
Title	Details	Peak chart positions										Certifications	Sales
Title	Details	UK	SCO	AUT	DEN	FRA	GER	IRE	JPN	NL	SWI	Certifications	Sales
Busted	Released: 30 September 2002; Label: Island (#MCD60084); Formats: CD, CS, DL	2	1	19	9	57	43	5	25	51	88	BPI: 4× Platinum; RIAJ: Gold	WW: 2,295,110
A Present for Everyone	Released: 17 November 2003; Label: Island (#MCD60090); Formats: CD, CS, DL	2	1	—	33	—	85	9	16	—	—	BPI: 3× Platinum; RIAJ: Gold	WW: 2,189,199
Night Driver	Released: 25 November 2016; Label: East West; Formats: CD, DL, LP	13	15	—	—	—	—	39	—	—	—	BPI: Silver	UK: 60,000 (as of 2020)
Half Way There	Released: 1 February 2019; Label: East West; Formats: CD, DL, LP	2	3	—	—	—	—	45	—	—	—		
"—" denotes an album that did not chart or was not released.

=== Live albums ===
Title	Details	Peak chart positions		Certifications
Title	Details	UK	IRE	Certifications
A Ticket for Everyone: Busted Live	Released: 13 November 2004; Label: Island (#MCD60096); Formats: CD, DL, DVD-V	11	35	BPI: Platinum
Greatest Hits 2.0 (Another Present For Everyone) [Live Edition]	Released: 5 January 2024; Label: Self-Released (#MCD60096)	—	—	

=== Compilation albums ===
Title	Details	Peak chart positions		Certifications
Title	Details	UK	IRE	Certifications
Busted	Released: 12 October 2004 (US only); Label: Island; Format: CD	—	—	
Greatest Hits 2.0	Released: 15 September 2023; Label: East West; Format: CD, digital download, vinyl, streaming, cassette	1	43	BPI: Silver
"—" denotes an album that did not chart or was not released.

== Extended play ==
Title	Details
Red Room Sessions	Released: 2003; Label: Island; Format: CD

== Singles ==
Title	Year	Peak chart positions										Certifications (sales thresholds)	Album
Title	Year	UK	SCO	AUS	AUT	DEN	FRA	GER	IRE	NL	SWI	Certifications (sales thresholds)	Album
"What I Go to School For"	2002	3	3	22	32	—	—	34	20	—	33	BPI: Platinum	Busted
"Year 3000"	2003	2	2	42	15	10	45	21	2	7	48	BPI: 2× Platinum	Busted
"You Said No"	2003	1	2	—	62	15	—	38	3	27	—		Busted
"Sleeping with the Light On"	2003	3	2	—	—	—	—	—	4	—	—	BPI: Silver	Busted
"Hurra Hurra Die Schule Brennt"	2003	—	—	—	20	—	—	19	—	—	34		Busted
"Crashed the Wedding"	2003	1	1	—	70	3	—	45	3	28	59	BPI: Platinum	A Present for Everyone
"Who's David"	2004	1	2	—	—	—	—	—	9	—	—	BPI: Silver	A Present for Everyone
"Air Hostess"	2004	2	3	—	—	—	—	51	12	—	—	BPI: Gold	A Present for Everyone
"Thunderbirds / 3AM"	2004	1	1	—	—	—	—	92	6	72	—	BPI: Gold	A Present for Everyone
"She Wants to Be Me"	2004	—	—	—	—	—	—	—	—	—	—		A Present for Everyone
"On What You're On"	2016	60	26	—	—	—	—	—	—	—	—		Night Driver
"Nineties"	2018	— (Note: "Nineties" did not enter the UK Singles Chart, but peaked at number 81 on the UK Singles Sales Chart.)	—	—	—	—	—	—	—	—	—		Half Way There
"Radio"	2019	—	—	—	—	—	—	—	—	—	—		Half Way There
"Loser Kid 2.0" (featuring Simple Plan)	2023	— (Note: "Loser Kid 2.0" did not enter the UK Singles Chart, but peaked at number 13 on the UK Singles Sales Chart.)	—	—	—	—	—	—	—	—	—		Greatest Hits 2.0
"Meet You There 2.0" (with Neck Deep)	2023	— (Note: "Meet You There 2.0" did not enter the UK Singles Chart, but peaked at number 32 on the UK Singles Sales Chart.)	—	—	—	—	—	—	—	—	—		Greatest Hits 2.0
"MMMBop 2.0" (with Hanson)	2023	— (Note: "MMMBop 2.0" did not enter the UK Singles Chart, but peaked at number 10 on the UK Singles Sales Chart.)	—	—	—	—	—	—	—	—	—		Greatest Hits 2.0
"Crashed the Wedding 2.0" (featuring All Time Low)	2023	— (Note: "Crashed the Wedding 2.0" did not enter the UK Singles Chart, but peaked at number 57 on the UK Singles Sales Chart.)	—	—	—	—	—	—	—	—	—		Greatest Hits 2.0
"Year 3000 2.0" (with Jonas Brothers)	2023	— (Note: "Year 3000 2.0" did not enter the UK Singles Chart, but peaked at number 29 on the UK Singles Sales Chart.)	—	—	—	—	—	—	—	—	—		Greatest Hits 2.0
"Good One"	2023	— (Note: "Good One" did not enter the UK Singles Chart, but peaked at number 41 on the UK Singles Sales Chart.)	—	—	—	—	—	—	—	—	—		Greatest Hits 2.0
"One of These Days"	2023	—	—	—	—	—	—	—	—	—	—		TBA
"—" denotes a single that did not chart or was not released.

=== Promotional singles ===
Title	Year	Album
"Coming Home"	2016	Night Driver
"Easy"	2016	Night Driver
"One of a Kind"	2016	Night Driver
"Thinking of You"	2017	Night Driver
"Reunion"	2018	Half Way There
"Shipwrecked in Atlantis"	2019	Half Way There
"Loser Kid 2.0"	2023	Greatest Hits 2.0

== Music videos ==
Year	Title	Director(s)
2002	"What I Go to School For"	Alison Murray
2003	"Year 3000"	Dougal Wilson and Tom Gravestock
2003	"You Said No"	Jon Riche
2003	"Sleeping with the Light On"	Sven Harding
2003	"Crashed the Wedding"	Max Giwa and Dania Pasquini
2003	"Hurra, hurra, die Schule brennt"	Liz Kessler and Pete Chambers
2004	"Who's David?"	Katie Bell
2004	"Air Hostess"	Ulf
2004	"Thunderbirds Are Go"	Jonathan Frakes
2004	"3AM"	Eugene O'Connor
2016	"Coming Home"	David Spearing
2016	"On What You're On"	Andy Hines
2018	"Nineties"	Rankin
2019	"Radio"	Rankin
2019	"Shipwrecked in Atlantis"	Josh Partridge
