= Greatest Hits 2.0 =

Compilation album by Busted
- Released: 15 September 2023
- Recorded: 2022–2023
- Genre: Pop punk; pop rock
- Length: 50:38 (Hits Version); 47:08 (Guest Features Edition)
- Label: Absolute Label Services
- Producer: Phil Gornell

Busted chronology
Half Way There (2019)	Greatest Hits 2.0 (2023)

Greatest Hits 2.0 is the first compilation album by English pop punk band Busted. It consists of re-recordings of tracks from their first two albums, Busted (2002) and A Present for Everyone (2003), as well as new song "Good One". It was released on 15 September 2023 through Absolute Label Services. The album reached number one on the UK albums chart, marking Busted's first number-one album.

The deluxe version of the album, Greatest Hits 2.0 (Guest Features Edition), features duets of their hits with other pop punk and pop rock artists and bands, as well as a duet with Hanson on "MMMBop 2.0".

== Background ==
Busted released their fourth studio album, Half Way There on 1 February 2019, accompanied by the Half Way There tour. After this, each member of the band pursued solo projects for the next few years: James Bourne released his first solo albums, Safe Journey Home (2020) and Sugar Beach (2022), while Simpson brought out his fourth solo effort, Hope Is a Drug. Willis, meanwhile, continued his acting career, appearing in stage productions such as Waitress and 2:22 A Ghost Story.

On 21 March 2023, the band posted a teaser on their social media platforms for an announcement to be unveiled on 23 March, putting an end to their hiatus. That morning, they announced a 15-date UK tour for September 2023. A single was also announced alongside the tour announcement: "Loser Kid 2.0", a re-recording of a song from their debut album featuring Simple Plan, set to release 14 April. An album of other re-recorded Busted classics featuring other artists, including McFly, All Time Low and Neck Deep, is set to be released as well. After selling out the initial 15-date tour, the band announced 11 additional dates in the UK and Ireland to meet demand, extending the tour until 10 October, making it the biggest UK arena tour of 2023.

On 14 April 2023, Busted released a version of "Loser Kid", the closing track of their 2002 self-titled debut album, titled "Loser Kid 2.0" featuring Canadian band Simple Plan. This version peaked at number 13 on the UK Singles Sales Chart. On 5 May 2023, Busted released "Meet You There 2.0", a pop-punk version of their 2003 album track, featuring Welsh rock band Neck Deep. On 26 May 2023, Busted released a cover version of the 1997 Hanson hit "MMMBop", in collaboration with the latter band, titled "MMMBop 2.0". On 23 June 2023, Busted released a version of their 2003 hit "Crashed the Wedding", titled "Crashed the Wedding 2.0", featuring American band All Time Low.

On 24 July 2023, they released a version of their 2003 hit "Year 3000" titled "Year 3000 2.0", featuring the Jonas Brothers on guest vocals and announced that Greatest Hits 2.0, a collaborative album of rerecordings of songs from Busted's first two albums, would be made available for pre-order on 28 July. The track listing was revealed that same day, featuring collaborations with the likes of You Me at Six, Wheatus, James Arthur and Busted's longtime friends McFly.

The album was produced in early 2023 by Phil Gornell in Los Angeles, mixed by Phil Gornell, Zakk Cervini and mastered by Grant Berry.

== Track listing ==
Greatest Hits 2.0 track listing
No.	Title	Writer(s)	Original album	Length
1.	"Year 3000 (Hits Version)"	Charlie Simpson; James Bourne; Tom Fletcher; Matt Willis; Steve Robson	Busted	3:17
2.	"Loser Kid (Hits Version)"	Simpson; Bourne; Willis	Busted	3:43
3.	"Good One"	Simpson; Bourne; Willis; Josh Wilkinson		3:40
4.	"3AM (Hits Version)"	Bourne; Simpson; Willis; Graham Edwards; Scott Spock; Lauren Christy	A Present for Everyone	3:35
5.	"What I Go to School For (Hits Version)"	Simpson; Bourne; Willis; John McLaughlin; Robson	Busted	4:06
6.	"Crashed the Wedding (Hits Version)"	Bourne; Fletcher	A Present for Everyone	2:40
7.	"You Said No (Hits Version)"	Bourne; Simpson; Willis; McLaughlin; Robson; Richard Mark Rashman	Busted	2:48
8.	"Sleeping with the Light On (Hits Version)"	Bourne; Willis	Busted	3:40
9.	"Air Hostess (Hits Version)"	Simpson; Bourne; Willis; Fletcher	A Present for Everyone	3:40
10.	"Thunderbirds Are Go (Hits Version)"	Simpson; Bourne; Willis; Fletcher; Barry Gray	A Present for Everyone	3:23
11.	"Who's David (Hits Version)"	Bourne; Fletcher	A Present for Everyone	3:26
12.	"Meet You There (Hits Version)"	Simpson; Bourne	A Present for Everyone	3:22
13.	"She Wants to Be Me (Hits Version)"	Bourne; Simpson; Willis; Edwards; Spock; Christy	A Present for Everyone	3:18
14.	"Everything I Knew (Hits Version)"	Bourne; Willis	Busted	3:09
15.	"Falling for You (Hits Version)"	Simpson; Bourne; Fletcher	A Present for Everyone	2:56
Total length:				50:48

Guest Features edition
No.	Title	Writer(s)	Length
1.	"Year 3000 2.0" (with Jonas Brothers)		3:17
2.	"Loser Kid 2.0" (featuring Simple Plan)		3:43
3.	"3AM 2.0" (with James Arthur)		3:35
4.	"Crashed the Wedding 2.0" (featuring All Time Low)		2:40
5.	"Meet You There 2.0" (with Neck Deep)		3:22
6.	"Air Hostess 2.0" (with You Me at Six)		3:40
7.	"Everything I Knew 2.0" (with Dashboard Confessional)		3:09
8.	"What I Go to School For 2.0" (with The Vamps)		4:06
9.	"Sleeping with the Light On 2.0" (with Deaf Havana)		3:40
10.	"MMMBop 2.0" (with Hanson)	Taylor Hanson; Issac Hanson; Zac Hanson	2:56
11.	"You Said No 2.0" (with Charlotte Sands)		2:48
12.	"Thunderbirds are Go 2.0" (with McFly)		3:23
13.	"She Wants to Be Me 2.0" (with Bowling for Soup)		3:18
14.	"Who's David 2.0" (with Wheatus)		3:26
15.	"Year 3000 (Hits Version)"		3:17
16.	"Loser Kid (Hits Version)"		3:43
17.	"Good One" (only in the download release)		3:40
18.	"3AM (Hits Version)"		3:35
19.	"What I Go to School For (Hits Version)"		4:06
20.	"Crashed the Wedding (Hits Version)"		2:40
21.	"You Said No (Hits Version)"		2:48
22.	"Sleeping with the Light On (Hits Version)"		3:40
23.	"Air Hostess (Hits Version)"		3:40
24.	"Thunderbirds Are Go (Hits Version)"		3:23
25.	"Who's David (Hits Version)"		3:26
Total length:			1:25:10

Ahead of its original release, pre-order CD copies of the standard edition were misprinted as the Guest Features edition.

== Charts ==
=== Weekly charts ===
Weekly chart performance for Greatest Hits 2.0
Chart (2023–24)	Peak position
Belgian Albums (Ultratop Flanders)	121
Irish Albums (Official Charts)	43
Japanese Top Download Albums (Billboard)	54
Scottish Albums (Official Charts)	1
UK Albums (Official Charts)	1
UK Independent Albums (Official Charts)	1

=== Year-end charts ===
Year-end chart performance for Greatest Hits 2.0
Chart (2023)	Position
UK Cassette Albums (OCC)	13

== Certifications ==
Certifications for Greatest Hits 2.0
Region	Certification	Certified units/sales
United Kingdom (BPI)	Silver	60,000^{‡}
^{‡} Sales+streaming figures based on certification alone.
