= A Ticket for Everyone: Busted Live =

A Ticket for Everyone

Live album by Busted
- Released: 1 November 2004
- Recorded: 19 March 2004
- Venues: Manchester Evening News Arena, England
- Genres: Pop rock; pop punk
- Length: 43:05
- Label: Universal Island
- Producer: Steve Robson

Busted chronology
Busted (2004)	A Ticket for Everyone (2004)	Night Driver (2016)

A Ticket for Everyone is a live album by English pop punk band Busted. It contains twelve tracks recorded during the Manchester leg of their A Present for Everyone tour, plus the studio version of "Thunderbirds Are Go", which had not previously been included on an album in the United Kingdom. The album contains live versions of the group's singles, as well as a cover of the 1978 Undertones song "Teenage Kicks" and album track "That Thing You Do". The Continental version of the album omits "She Wants to Be Me", due to contractual issues, and the studio version of "Thunderbirds Are Go", as it was previously issued on the 2004 reissue of A Present for Everyone in Continental Europe. The DVD version omits the live performance of "Thunderbirds Are Go!" but includes the music video as a bonus feature. The DVD also includes a cover of the 2003 Black Eyed Peas song "Where Is the Love?" and the album tracks "Why", "Britney", "Better Than This", "Fake" and "Nerdy".

== Personnel ==
Busted

- James Bourne – electric and acoustic guitars, co-lead vocals
- Charlie Simpson – lead guitar, co-lead vocals
- Matt Willis – bass, co-lead vocals

Additional musicians

- Damon Wilson – drums
- Chris Banks – keyboards
- Chris Leonard – guitar

== Background ==
Bourne, Simpson, and Willis were augmented by Chris Banks, Damon Wilson, and Chris Leonard. On bbc.co.uk, Adam Cumiskey stated: "The live element of this album is slightly staid: there's no improvisation in the songs; they sound exactly like the singles. However, with their swagger and confidence... they manage to resist sounding like a contestant in a battle of the bands competition".

Unlike their two studio albums, A Ticket for Everyone was only a minor hit on the UK Albums Chart, peaking at number 11. Busted officially split up two months after its release. An accompanying DVD featuring footage from the Manchester concerts was released with the same title. The DVD went Platinum in the UK.

== Track listing ==
A Ticket for Everyone — UK standard CD edition
No.	Title	Writer(s)	Length
1.	"Air Hostess"	James Bourne; Tom Fletcher; Charlie Simpson; Matt Willis	6:31
2.	"That Thing You Do"	Bourne; Fletcher; Simpson	3:48
3.	"What I Go to School For"	Bourne; Simpson; Willis; John McLaughlin; Steve Robson	3:32
4.	"She Wants to Be Me"	Bourne; Simpson; Willis; Graham Edwards; Scott Spock; Lauren Christy	3:36
5.	"3AM"	Bourne; Simpson; Willis; Edwards; Spock; Christy	3:54
6.	"Who's David"	Bourne; Fletcher	3:55
7.	"Thunderbirds Are Go"	Bourne	3:15
8.	"Teenage Kicks"	John O'Neill	2:54
9.	"You Said No"	Bourne; Simpson; Willis; McLaughlin; Robson; Richard Mark Rashman	3:17
10.	"Year 3000"	Bourne; Simpson; Willis; Robson; Fletcher	3:55
11.	"Sleeping with the Light On"	Bourne; Willis	4:13
12.	"Crashed the Wedding"	Bourne; Fletcher	3:54
13.	"Thunderbirds Are Go" (Studio version)	Bourne	3:11
Total length:			49:55

A Ticket for Everyone — DVD edition
No.	Title	Writer(s)	Length
1.	"Air Hostess"	James Bourne; Tom Fletcher; Charlie Simpson; Matt Willis
2.	"That Thing You Do"	Bourne; Fletcher; Simpson
3.	"What I Go to School For"	Bourne; Simpson; Willis; John McLaughlin; Steve Robson
4.	"She Wants to Be Me"	Bourne; Simpson; Willis; Graham Edwards; Scott Spock; Lauren Christy
5.	"3AM"	Bourne; Simpson; Willis; Edwards; Spock; Christy
6.	"Why"	Simpson; Will Simpson
7.	"Britney"	Bourne; McLaughlin; Robson
8.	"Who's David"	Bourne; Fletcher
9.	"Teenage Kicks"	John O'Neill
10.	"Better Than This"	Willis; Steve Power; Guy Chambers
11.	"Where Is the Love?"	will.i.am; apl.de.ap; Taboo; Justin Timberlake; Printz Board; Michael Fratantuno; George Pajon
12.	"Fake"	Willis; Power; Chambers
13.	"Nerdy"	Bourne; Fletcher; Simpson
14.	"You Said No"	Bourne; Simpson; Willis; McLaughlin; Robson; Richard Mark Rashman
15.	"Year 3000"	Bourne; Simpson; Willis; Robson; Fletcher
16.	"Sleeping with the Light On"	Bourne; Willis
17.	"Crashed the Wedding"	Bourne; Fletcher

The DVD release includes a documentary, Puntercam, Teenage Kicks in colour and the music videos of Thunderbirds Are Go, Crashed the Wedding and What I Go to School For as special features.

== Charts ==
=== Weekly charts ===
Chart (2004)	Peak position
Irish Albums (IRMA)	35
Scottish Albums (Official Charts)	8
UK Albums (Official Charts)	11

=== Year-end charts ===
Chart (2004)	Position
UK Albums (OCC)	43

== Certifications ==
Region	Certification	Certified units/sales
United Kingdom (BPI)	Platinum	300,000^{^}
^{^} Shipments figures based on certification alone.
