= Busted (2004 Busted album) =

Compilation album by Busted
- Released: 12 October 2004
- Recorded: 2002–2004
- Genres: Pop rock; pop punk
- Length: 42:22
- Label: Universal Island
- Producers: Steve Robson; Steve Power; The Matrix; James Bourne

Busted chronology
A Present for Everyone (2003)	Busted (2004)	A Ticket for Everyone (2004)

Professional ratings
Review scores
Source	Rating
AllMusic	2.5/5 stars
IGN	2.5/10

Busted is a compilation album by British pop punk band Busted, released in the United States in October 2004. Ten of the twelve tracks had been released as singles in the United Kingdom, with "Falling for You" being included with the intention of its being released as the group's first single in the United States, and "Teenage Kicks" being included due to its popularity amongst British fans. The song is a cover of The Undertones' classic, first issued as the B-side of "Who's David". This could allow the album to be viewed as the band's greatest hits. The album contains four tracks from their first album, also titled Busted and seven from the follow-up A Present for Everyone. The release of the album coincided with a documentary titled America or Busted, which chronicled the band's ill-fated attempts to break into the American market.

== Track listing ==
No.	Title	Writer(s)	Length
1.	"Air Hostess"	James Bourne; Tom Fletcher; Charlie Simpson; Matt Willis	3:54
2.	"What I Go to School For" (Steve Power version)	Bourne; Simpson; Willis; John McLaughlin; Steve Robson	3:33
3.	"Crashed the Wedding"	Bourne; Fletcher	2:40
4.	"3AM" (Single version)	Bourne; Simpson; Willis; Graham Edwards; Scott Spock; Lauren Christy	3:38
5.	"Teenage Kicks"	John O'Neill	2:22
6.	"She Wants to Be Me"	Bourne; Simpson; Sargeant; Edwards; Spock; Christy	3:25
7.	"You Said No"	Bourne; Simpson; Willis; McLaughlin; Robson; Richard Mark Rashman	2:49
8.	"Thunderbirds"	Bourne; Fletcher; Simpson; Sargeant; Barry Gray	3:11
9.	"Who's David" (Single version)	Bourne; Fletcher	3:30
10.	"Year 3000"	Bourne; Simpson; Robson; Sargeant; Matthew Fletcher	3:18
11.	"Sleeping with the Light On" (Single version)	Bourne; Sargeant	3:19
12.	"Falling for You"	Bourne; Fletcher; Simpson	3:00
