= Thunderbirds Are Go (disambiguation) =

Thunderbirds Are Go is a 1966 British science fiction puppet film.

Thunderbirds Are Go may also refer to:

- Thunderbirds Are Go (TV series) (2015–2020)
- "Thunderbirds Are Go" (song), incidental music used in the Thunderbirds franchise
  - "Thunderbirds" (song), also known as "Thunderbirds Are Go", a 2004 song by Busted based on that music

== See also ==
- Thunderbirds (TV series), 1964–1966
