= Nineties (song) =

Single by Busted

from the album Half Way There
- Released: 2 November 2018
- Genre: Pop punk
- Length: 3:03
- Label: East West
- Songwriters: James Bourne, Charlie Simpson, Matt Willis, Dougie Poynter
- Producer: Gil Norton

Busted singles chronology
"On What You're On" (2016)	"Nineties" (2018)	"Radio" (2019)

Music video
- "Nineties" on YouTube

"Nineties" is a song by English pop punk band Busted. It was released on 2 November 2018 as the lead single from their fourth studio album, Half Way There (2019).

== Background ==
Charlie Simpson wore drag for the song's music video, something he also did in the band's 2003 music video of the single "Crashed the Wedding".

The song is a nostalgia track, mentioning culture from the 1990s, including watching the film The Goonies, meeting Saved by the Bell character Kelly Kapowski (played by actress Tiffani Thiessen), and bands such as Oasis, Nirvana and the Smashing Pumpkins. The song is the first Busted recording to feature harsh vocals from Charlie Simpson, who had previously only used the vocal technique with Fightstar or during live performances of 3AM.

In an interview with Digital Spy, Matt Willis said: "I was more excited about releasing 'Nineties' than I have been about anything. I'm really pleased it's out there. I've had that song on my phone for about a year."

== Music video ==
The music video premiered on YouTube on 12 November 2018 and sees the band referencing different pop culture from the 90s, such as Smashing Pumpkins, Nirvana, Top of the Pops, Westlife, The Fresh Prince of Bel-Air, Blind Date and even sees them referencing the music video for their first single, "What I Go to School For". Simpson once again dressed as a woman for the video, something done in the 2003 "Crashed the Wedding" music video. The video was directed by British photographer Rankin.

Simpson said that the intention of the video was 'to tell musicians not to take themselves too seriously', and that they were trying to make a video similar to those previously released by Foo Fighters and Blink-182.

== Charts ==
Chart performance for "Nineties"
Chart (2018)	Peak position
UK Singles Downloads (OCC)	81
UK Singles Sales (OCC)	81

== See also ==
- Crashed the Wedding
