= McBusted (album) =

Studio album by McBusted
- Released: 1 December 2014
- Genres: Pop rock; pop punk
- Length: 40:15 (standard edition) 49:00 (deluxe edition)
- Label: Island

Singles from McBusted
- 1. "Air Guitar" Released: 23 November 2014; 2. "Get Over It" Released: 12 January 2015

McBusted is the only studio album by the English pop punk supergroup McBusted. It was released through Island Records on 1 December 2014. The album was preceded by the release of lead single "Air Guitar", which peaked at number 12 in the United Kingdom.

The album received positive reviews from music critics. It debuted at number nine on the UK Albums Chart, whilst also making 31 in the Republic of Ireland.

== Background and development ==
In November 2013, it was announced that Busted's James Bourne and Matt Willis would come together with McFly and tour together as the supergroup "McBusted". Between April and June 2014, they performed 42 sold-out shows across the UK and Ireland, playing Busted and McFly's greatest hits. They also headlined British Summer Time in Hyde Park on 6 July. Due to the enormous success of the tour, it was reported that they could release new material together. During an interview on The Jonathan Ross Show in February 2014, Willis said: "We always said that we weren't going to say we were going to bring out music, because we didn't want to say that we were going to make music and it be terrible. But we went away, we did some writing and it wasn't terrible." In April, Judd revealed that they would be releasing an album. He told Capital FM, "We were thinking of going in the studio and properly laying something down before the tour started. We've had no time because of Tom [Fletcher] having his baby, the tour rehearsals and Matt's filming bits on EastEnders. Everyone has been so busy. It will happen after the tour. We'll be writing on the road and hopefully soon after the tour we'll get in the studio."

On 7 October 2014, Fletcher revealed that McBusted would be releasing their debut single "Air Guitar" on 23 November. Additionally, it was announced that they had been signed to Island Records, after a bidding war with Sony Music. Fletcher also posted a sneak preview of the song on his Instagram page. On 23 October, the band announced via Twitter that their debut album McBusted would be available to pre-order the following day, before its official release on 1 December. The album includes the songs "What Happened to Your Band", which Bourne wrote after the break-up of Busted, and "Hate Your Guts", which features Blink-182 bassist and vocalist, Mark Hoppus (who also wrote the track "Sensitive Guy"). The album also features appearances by All Time Low lead singer Alex Gaskarth and Weezer frontman Rivers Cuomo. Regarding Hoppus, Fletcher said, "He'd been such a huge influence on our songwriting that to finally get in a room with him was so fun, if slightly surreal." "What Happened to Your Band" was released on 11 November 2014, with "Hate Your Guts" following one week later on 18 November 2014, both as promotional songs available to fans who had pre-ordered the album via iTunes.

The track 'What Happened to Your Band' had been written by Bourne years before the band or the album had been planned. The track was written about Busted's split, and was initially performed by Son of Dork on their Sic Tour (2007). It was planned for release of the deluxe edition of Welcome to Loserville, however said version of the album never amounted and the song was never recorded, and the edition on McBusted was the first released. The song has since been re-worked by Willis, Bourne and Charlie Simpson as Busted and was featured on their 2019 release Half Way There.

== Singles ==
On 7 October 2014, it was announced that McBusted's debut single would be called "Air Guitar" and would be released on 23 November. The song debuted at number 12 on the UK Singles Chart.

The second single to be taken from the album was the song "Get Over It". The single was released on 12 January 2015, reaching number 82 on the UK Singles Chart, failing to match the success of lead single "Air Guitar".

== Critical reception ==
Professional ratings
Review scores
Source	Rating
The Arts Desk	Positive
The Guardian	2/5 stars
MTV	4/5 stars
sugarscape.com	4/5 stars
Unreality TV	4.5/5 stars

The album received mixed-to-positive reviews from critics. Lucy Bacon of MTV said "this talented bunch of boys have knocked their heads together and really delivered with their debut self-titled record", and called it "a perfectly blended combination of [McFly and Busted]". Jeremy Williams-Chalmers of So So Gay was more positive still, calling the album "an amazingly rounded debut", with a demonstration of an "ability to connect on more than one level that makes them such an excitingly addictive prospect".

On the other hand, Tim Jonze of The Guardian was less positive, asking if "perhaps a McBusted album that engaged seriously with the loss of mega-success would have made for a better listen", but still praised "What Happened to Your Band" as "a harmony-drenched pop-punk number that makes post-fame despair seem oddly relatable."

== Track listing ==
McBusted — Standard edition
No.	Title	Writer(s)	Producer(s)	Length
1.	"Air Guitar"	Tom Fletcher; James Bourne; Danny Jones; Steve Robson	Steve Robson; Jason Perry	3:19
2.	"Hate Your Guts" (featuring Mark Hoppus)	Fletcher; Dougie Poynter; Mark Hoppus	Robson; Jason Perry	2:10
3.	"What Happened to Your Band"	Bourne; Tommy Henriksen; Michael Raphael; John Fields	Robson; Jason Perry	3:57
4.	"Get Over It"	Fletcher; Harry Judd; Robson; Alex Gaskarth	Robson	3:30
5.	"Riding on My Bike"	Bourne; Matt Willis; Josh Wilkinson	Sam Miller; Josh Wilkinson	3:37
6.	"Gone"	Fletcher; Jones; Robson	Robson	3:44
7.	"Sensitive Guy"	Fletcher; Poynter; Hoppus	Robson; Sam Miller	2:40
8.	"Beautiful Girls Are the Loneliest"	Bourne; Fields	Robson; Espionage	3:45
9.	"Before You Knew Me"	Fletcher; Willis; Matt Prime	Matt Prime	3:45
10.	"Back in Time"	Fletcher; Robson; Busbee	Robson	2:57
11.	"How's My Hair"	Fletcher; Bourne	Josh Wilkinson	4:06
12.	"Getting It Out"	McFly; Rivers Cuomo; Josh Alexander	Robson	2:45
Total length:				40:19

McBusted — Deluxe edition
No.	Title	Writer(s)	Producer(s)	Length
13.	"23:59"	Willis; Jones; Poynter; Judd; Roy Stride	Steve Robson	3:07
14.	"In da Club"	McBusted	Steve Robson	2:51
15.	"I See Red"	Bourne; Willis	Josh Wilkinson	2:47
Total length:				49:06

McBusted— Japanese edition
No.	Title	Writer(s)	Length
16.	"Air Hostess" (Live at the O2 Arena)	Bourne; Fletcher; Charlie Simpson
17.	"Obviously" (Live at the O2 Arena)	Bourne; Fletcher
18.	"You Said No" (Live at the O2 Arena)	Bourne; Willis; Simpson; Robson; John McLaughlin
19.	"Star Girl" (Live at the O2 Arena)	Fletcher; Jones; Perry; Poynter; Judd; Julian Emery; Daniel P. Carter

== Personnel ==
Credits adapted from the album's liner notes.

McBusted

McFly

- Danny Jones – vocals, guitar
- Tom Fletcher – vocals, guitar
- Harry Judd – drums, percussion
- Dougie Poynter – vocals; bass (1–4, 9–12, 14)

Busted

- James Bourne – vocals; guitar (3, 8, 15)
- Matt Willis – vocals; bass (1, 5–8, 13, 15)

Additional musicians

- Steve Robson – keyboards (all), synth bass (5)
- Mark Hoppus – vocals (2)
- Alex Gaskarth – vocals (4)

== Charts ==
=== Weekly charts ===
Weekly chart performance for McBusted
Chart (2014–15)	Peak position
Australian Albums (ARIA)	48
Irish Albums (IRMA)	31
Japanese Albums (Oricon)	147
Scottish Albums (Official Charts)	9
UK Albums (Official Charts)	9

=== Year-end charts ===
Year-end chart performance for McBusted
Chart (2014)	Position
UK Albums (OCC)	85

== Certifications ==
Certifications for McBusted
Region	Certification	Certified units/sales
United Kingdom (BPI)	Gold	100,000^{*}
^{*} Sales figures based on certification alone.

== Release history ==
Region	Date	Format	Label
Germany	28 November 2014	Digital download	Island Records
Ireland	28 November 2014	Digital download	Island Records
France	1 December 2014	Digital download	Island Records
Spain	1 December 2014	Digital download	Island Records
United Kingdom	1 December 2014	Digital download	Island Records
Australia	1 December 2014	Digital download	Island Records
New Zealand	1 December 2014	Digital download	Island Records
United States	1 December 2014	Digital download	Island Records
