= Half Way There =

Studio album by Busted
- Released: 1 February 2019
- Recorded: 2017–2018
- Genre: Pop-punk
- Length: 36:29
- Label: East West
- Producer: Gil Norton

Busted chronology
Night Driver (2016)	Half Way There (2019)	Greatest Hits 2.0 (2023)

Singles from Half Way There
- 1. "Nineties" Released: 2 November 2018; 2. "Radio" Released: 9 January 2019

Professional ratings
Review scores
Source	Rating
AllMusic	4/5 stars
AltCorner	Positive
Clash	5/10
Dead Press!	8/10 stars
The Edge	3/5 stars
Entertainment Focus	4/5 stars
Spalding Today	Positive

Half Way There is the fourth studio album by English pop punk band Busted. It was released on 1 February 2019 and it received positive reviews from critics.

== Background and composition ==
In June 2017, Busted flew to Los Angeles to perform their first American gig as a reformed band at the Troubadour. During this trip, they also continued writing and began recording for their planned fourth studio album. In April 2018, it was confirmed the album would release in Q1 2019, and the band would return to their original sound. In May that year, Cobus Potgieter, who had previously stood in as drummer on Busted's 2016 tour, announced that he would be the studio drummer for the upcoming fourth album.

On 26 October 2018, Busted announced that the album would be called Half Way There. The album's title is a reference to a lyric in Busted's 2003 single "Year 3000": "Everybody bought our seventh album / It had outsold Michael Jackson". James Bourne said in an interview, "Once you get halfway through the album, you're officially half way there".

According to the press release, the album is a return to the early pop-punk sound that the band originally became known for, after their previous album, Night Driver (2016), had a heavy electronic sound.

"A rush of melody and effervescent riffs that see the band blend huge arena-filling choruses with the classic pop-punk sound of Blink-182 and New Found Glory. Lyrically it's often reflective and nostalgic ('Reunion', 'All My Friends' and a mini Busted autobiography in the shape of 'It Happens'), but there are some fantastical flights of fancy too in the shape of 'Shipwrecked In Atlantis' and a tribute to Elon Musk in 'Race To Mars'."

The track "Shipwrecked in Atlantis" is a continuation of the band's 2004 single "Air Hostess". It is also sonically similar to Blink-182's song "The Rock Show".

The track "What Happened to Your Band" was previously performed live by one of James Bourne's other bands, Son of Dork back in 2007. It was first recorded for the McBusted album back in 2014. The band recorded a new version featuring Simpson and without McFly for the album, as the band believed that it fit the album's themes of nostalgia, reflection, and their hearkening back to their earlier pop-punk sound due to the lyrics dealing with James Bourne's life after Busted initially broke up in 2005.

Of the return to the band's roots, Charlie Simpson said, "We couldn't have made this album 10 years ago. [...] I don't think the record label would have stood for it. It's a proper pop-punk record, so I always feel like this album is the band that Busted could have been. [...] It's like a rejuvenation of the old sound. [...] Night Driver was awesome, but I think it confused a lot of people. We loved it, but I think for a fan wanting to hear Busted again, people had to readjust their mind as to what they were hearing."

== Singles ==
Busted released the album's lead promo track, "Nineties", on 2 November 2018.

"Reunion" was released on 14 December 2018 as an instant download. "All My Friends" was released a day after for those who pre-ordered the album from the official website.

The first single, "Radio", was released on 9 January 2019, exclusively on BBC Radio 2. Bassist Matt Willis said of the single:

This is our first official single off the record, the other stuff was kind of given out to [the] fan base to kind of entice them, but this is the first 'big boy' single, so enjoy it. It's called 'Radio".

— Matt Willis

== Track listing ==
Adapted from the band's store.

No.	Title	Writer(s)	Producer(s)	Length
1.	"Nineties"	James Bourne; Charlie Simpson; Matt Willis; Dougie Poynter	Gil Norton	3:02
2.	"Reunion"	J. Bourne; Simpson; Willis; Joshua Wilkinson	Norton	3:26
3.	"What Happened to Your Band"	J. Bourne; Michael Raphael	Norton; Fields	4:03
4.	"Shipwrecked in Atlantis"	J. Bourne; Simpson; Willis; Chris Bourne	Norton	3:21
5.	"Race to Mars"	J. Bourne; Simpson; Willis; Wilkinson; C. Bourne	Norton	3:21
6.	"All My Friends"	J. Bourne; Simpson; Willis; Fields	Norton; Fields	3:51
7.	"MIA"	J. Bourne; Simpson; Willis; C. Bourne	Norton	3:25
8.	"Radio"	J. Bourne; Simpson; Willis; Wilkinson	Norton	4:03
9.	"Nostalgia"	J. Bourne; Simpson; Willis; C. Bourne	Norton	3:32
10.	"It Happens"	J. Bourne; C. Bourne	Norton	4:25
Total length:				36:29

== Personnel ==
Busted

- Charlie Simpson – vocals, lead guitar, programming, percussion
- James Bourne – vocals, rhythm guitar, keyboards
- Matt Willis – vocals, bass

Additional musicians

- Cobus Potgieter – drums
- Josh Wilkinson – programming (track 5), piano (track 8)
- Chris Bourne – guitar (track 5)

== Charts ==
Chart (2019)	Peak position
Irish Albums (IRMA)	45
Scottish Albums (OCC)	3
UK Albums (OCC)	2
