= Volume 1 (Future Boy album) =

Future Boy: Volume 1

Studio album by Future Boy
- Released: 3 June 2010
- Recorded: 2008–2009
- Genre: Electronic
- Length: 37:14
- Label: Future Records
- Producer: James Bourne, Tommy Henriksen

Volume 1 is the debut solo album from ex-Busted and Son of Dork band member James Bourne, under the name Future Boy. The complete album was officially released via digital download on 3 June 2010. Produced and mixed by Tommy Henriksen and James Bourne, Bourne describes the album as "100% electronic - and not a rock album". The album had been previously released in two halves - with 'Side A' being released on 3 May, and 'Side B' being released on 1 June. The album's artwork was designed and painted by Paul Karslake. Bourne claims that the album will be released on CD at 'some point', but it will depend on 'when he has the cash'. Bourne has promoted the album by being the supporting act for Twenty Twenty during their 2010 Clubs & Pubs Tour.

The entire album was written and recorded in a week and but was not released straight away.

== Track listing ==
No.	Title	Writer(s)	Length
1.	"Get Up"	James Bourne, Matt Blair	3:15
2.	"Pressure to Stay Together"	Bourne, Andreas Carlsson	3:34
3.	"Step By Step"	Bourne, Tommy Henriksen, Jermaine Jackson, Christopher Terence Johnson	3:27
4.	"Karate On My Heart"	Bourne, Henriksen, Patrick Monahan	3:09
5.	"Hoping For Disaster"	Bourne, Aaron Kamin	4:22
6.	"You Can Dance"	Bourne, Henriksen	3:28
7.	"Headlights"	Bourne, Henriksen	4:12
8.	"Nervous"	Bourne, Henriksen	3:38
9.	"Internet (Featuring Gabriela Arciero)"	Bourne	4:19
10.	"Space Travellers"	Bourne	3:50
Total length:			37:14
