= Meet You There (song) =

Song by Busted

from the album A Present for Everyone
- Recorded: 2003 (original); 2015 (Abbey Road Studios re-recording)
- Length: 3:41 (original); 3:27 (2015 version)
- Label: Universal Island (original)
- Songwriters: James Bourne; Charlie Simpson
- Producer: Steve Power

"Meet You There" is a song by English pop punk band Busted. It was written by James Bourne and Charlie Simpson and was originally recorded for, and included on, their second studio album A Present for Everyone (2003). It was a fan favourite, despite not being an official single.

In 2015, ten years after disbanding in 2005, Busted re-recorded the song at Abbey Road Studios, their first new recording in 12 years, and released a music video for it. The re-recorded version appeared as a bonus track on Japanese editions of the group's third album Night Driver (2016). Unlike the previous studio version the new recording added Matt taking the lead vocals for the chorus.

== 2023 remake ==
On 5 May 2023, Busted released "Meet You There 2.0", a pop-punk version of "Meet You There", in a collaboration with Neck Deep. The single is expected to be included in their forthcoming studio album of remade Busted tracks. "Meet You There 2.0" peaked at number 30 on the UK Singles Downloads Chart and at number 32 on the UK Singles Sales Chart on 12 May 2023.
