= Air Hostess (song) =

2004 single by Busted

- CD1 cover

Single by Busted

from the album A Present for Everyone
- B-side: "Mummy Trade"; "Peaches"; "Let It Go"
- Released: 26 April 2004
- Length: 3:57
- Label: Universal; Island
- Songwriters: James Bourne; Charlie Simpson; Matt Willis; Tom Fletcher
- Producer: Steve Power

Busted singles chronology
| "Who's David" (2004) | "Air Hostess" (2004) | "Thunderbirds" / "3AM" (2004) |

"Air Hostess"
- CD2 cover

Music video
- "Air Hostess" on YouTube

"Air Hostess" is a song by English pop punk band Busted. Composed by the band along with Tom Fletcher of McFly and Stewart Henderson, it was released on 26 April 2004 as the third single from their second studio album, A Present for Everyone (2003), and reached number two on the UK Singles Chart.

== Background and promotion ==
The song was inspired by flight attendants which Busted saw whilst on tour. The B-sides "Mummy Trade", "Peaches", and "Let It Go" did not appear on any other release, and were exclusive to this single. "Mummy Trade" was written by James Bourne and Charlie Simpson, "Let It Go" was written by Bourne and McFly members Harry Judd and Dougie Poynter, while "Peaches" is a cover of the Presidents of the United States of America. They were occasionally played live, such as on CD:UK which was on 1 May 2004 on ITV1.

The single was also promoted by appearances on Top of the Pops Saturday, MOM, Popworld, CD:UK, Friday Night with Jonathan Ross, TRL and the short-lived Simply the Best.

== Music video ==
The music video was filmed at Imperial War Museum Duxford on 20 February 2004. It features the band spying on two female flight attendants and illegally boarding the aeroplane (Concorde) they are travelling on. The line "I messed my pants when we flew over France" was edited out when the video was shown during the daytime.

== Track listings ==
UK CD1

1. "Air Hostess"
2. "Mummy Trade"

UK CD2

1. "Air Hostess"
2. "Peaches"
3. "Let It Go"
4. "Air Hostess" (video)
5. Interactive interview

UK limited-edition 7-inch picture disc

A. "Air Hostess"
B. "Let It Go"

Japanese mini-album

1. "Air Hostess"
2. "Let It Go"
3. "Peaches"
4. "Mummy Trade"
5. "You Said No" (live)
6. "Sleeping with the Light On" (live)
7. "What I Go to School For" (Steve Power mix)
8. "Air Hostess" (video)

== Personnel ==
Personnel are taken from the A Present for Everyone album booklet.

- James Bourne – writing
- Charlie Simpson – writing
- Matt Willis – writing
- Tom Fletcher – writing
- Steve Power – production, mixing, programming
- Dan Porter – assistant recording engineer

== Charts ==
=== Weekly charts ===
Weekly chart performance for "Air Hostess"
| Chart (2004) | Peak position |
|---|---|
| Europe (Eurochart Hot 100) | 9 |
| Germany (GfK) | 51 |
| Hungary (Dance Top 40) | 40 |
| Ireland (IRMA) | 12 |
| Scottish Singles Sales (Official Charts) | 3 |
| UK Singles (Official Charts) | 2 |
| UK Airplay (Music Week) | 24 |

=== Year-end charts ===
Year-end chart performance for "Air Hostess"
| Chart (2004) | Position |
|---|---|
| UK Singles (OCC) | 100 |

== Certifications ==
Certifications for "Air Hostess"
| Region | Certification | Certified units/sales |
|---|---|---|
| United Kingdom (BPI) | Gold | 400,000^{‡} |
^{‡} Sales+streaming figures based on certification alone.

== Release history ==
Release dates and formats for "Air Hostess"
| Region | Date | Format(s) | Label(s) | Ref. |
|---|---|---|---|---|
| United Kingdom | 26 April 2004 | 7-inch vinyl; CD | Universal; Island | |
| Japan | 28 April 2004 | CD | Universal Island | |
