= Who's David =

2004 single by Busted

- CD1 cover

Single by Busted

from the album A Present for Everyone
- B-side: "Teenage Kicks"; "Where Is the Love?"; "Fall at Your Feet"
- Released: 16 February 2004
- Length: 3:35 (uncensored album version); 3:19 (single version)
- Label: Universal; Island
- Songwriters: James Bourne; Tom Fletcher
- Producer: Steve Power

Busted singles chronology
"Crashed the Wedding" (2003)	"Who's David" (2004)	"Air Hostess" (2004)

"Air Hostess"
- CD2 cover

Music video
- "Who's David" on YouTube

"Who's David" is a song by British pop punk band Busted. It was released on 16 February 2004 as the second single from their second studio album, A Present for Everyone (2003). It was co-written by Tom Fletcher of McFly. The single features the live version of "Teenage Kicks", which the band performed at the 2004 Brit Awards ceremony. In response to being frequently asked "who is David?", Willis claimed that David is the name of his facial mole.

The song was written about experiences with a girl who is unfaithful. It peaked at number one on the UK Singles Chart, becoming the band's third number-one single and their second consecutive.

== Critical reception ==
In August 2004, "Who's David" came 20th in a VH1 viewer survey of the worst number-one singles of all time. In her review of Busted's May 2016 show at Wembley Arena during the Pigs Can Fly Tour 2016, The Daily Telegraph's Alice Vincent wrote: "Who's David, which paints its female muse crudely, has dated badly – especially when misogynistic epithets came from the mouths of now fully grown men." When asked about it by Harriet Gibsone of The Guardian, Bourne seemed confused; Willis replied "Basically, it's not cool to call women bitches any more.", whilst Simpson said "[he was] not sure it ever was."

== Music video ==
The official music video features Busted before they go on stage for a gig at Wembley Arena. The video begins with the band backstage, followed by thousands of fans piling into the arena. Busted are swamped by paparazzi as they go towards the stage, but are helped there by management. The video ends with Busted running up a ramp onto the stage.

== Track listings ==
UK CD1 and cassette single

1. "Who's David" (single version)
2. "Teenage Kicks"

UK CD2

1. "Who's David" (single version)
2. "Where Is the Love?"
3. "Fall at Your Feet"
4. "Who's David" (video)

Japanese CD single

1. "Who's David"
2. "Where Is the Love?"
3. "Fall at Your Feet"
4. "Teenage Kicks"
5. "Who's David" (video)

== Personnel ==
Personnel are taken from the A Present for Everyone album booklet.

- James Bourne – writing
- Tom Fletcher – writing
- Steve Power – production, mixing, programming
- Dan Porter – assistant recording engineer

== Charts ==
=== Weekly charts ===
Weekly chart performance for "Who's David"
Chart (2004)	Peak position
Europe (Eurochart Hot 100)	6
Ireland (IRMA)	9
Romania (Romanian Top 100)	89
Scottish Singles Sales (Official Charts)	2
Spain Airplay (Top 40 Radio)	22
UK Singles (Official Charts)	1
UK Airplay (Music Week)	30

=== Year-end charts ===
Year-end chart performance for "Who's David"
Chart (2004)	Position
UK Singles (OCC)	75

== Certifications ==
Certifications for "Who's David"
Region	Certification	Certified units/sales
United Kingdom (BPI)	Silver	200,000^{‡}
^{‡} Sales+streaming figures based on certification alone.

== Release history ==
Release dates and formats for "Who's David"
Region	Date	Format(s)	Label(s)	Ref.
United Kingdom	16 February 2004	CD; cassette	Universal; Island	
Japan	25 February 2004	CD	Universal; Island	
