= Sleeping with the Light On =

2003 single by Busted

- CD1 cover

Single by Busted

from the album Busted
- B-side: "Year Three School Said No"; "Last Summer"
- Released: 11 August 2003
- Length: 3:14 (new edit); 3:38 (album version)
- Label: Universal Island
- Songwriters: James Bourne; Matthew Jay
- Producer: Steve Robson

Busted singles chronology
"Hurra, hurra, die Schule brennt" (2003)	"Sleeping with the Light On" (2003)	"Crashed the Wedding" (2003)

"Sleeping with the Light On"
- Limited edition tour CD cover

Music video
- "Sleeping with the Light On" on YouTube

"Sleeping with the Light On" is a song by English pop rock band Busted. It was the second song that band members James Bourne and Matt Willis wrote together. It was recorded in 2002 for their debut album, Busted, and later released on 11 August 2003 exclusively in the United Kingdom and Ireland as the album's fourth single. It reached number three on the UK Singles Chart.

== Background ==
"Sleeping with the Light On" was written by Busted members James Bourne and Matt Willis and produced by Steve Robson.

The song was heavily remixed for its release as a single; the first chorus is more forceful than on the album version. This "New Version" was also used for the song's music video. Among the single B-sides were a non-album track, "Last Summer"; a medley of Busted's first three singles, which was previously performed on CD:UK, and a live recording of "What I Go to School For" with 40,000 fans singing the chorus. The song was performed on Blue Peter, CD:UK, Popworld and Top of the Pops Saturday.

== Track listings ==
UK CD1

1. "Sleeping with the Light On" (new version)
2. "Year Three School Said No" (medley)
3. "Last Summer"
4. "Sleeping with the Light On" (enhanced section and video)

UK limited edition tour CD

1. "Sleeping with the Light On" (live)
2. "What I Go to School For" (40,000 Bust fans chorus)
3. "You Said No" (live)
4. Enhanced section

UK cassette single

1. "Sleeping with the Light On" (new version)
2. "Year Three School Said No" (medley)
3. "Year 3000" (demo version)

== Personnel ==
Personnel are taken from the Busted album booklet.

- Busted – all instruments
  - James Bourne – writing
  - Matt Willis – writing (as Matthew Jay)
  - Charlie Simpson
- Steve Robson – all instruments, production
- John McLaughlin – additional production
- Tom Elmhirst – mixing

== Charts ==
=== Weekly charts ===
Weekly chart performance for "Sleeping with the Light On"
Chart (2003)	Peak position
Europe (Eurochart Hot 100)	14
Ireland (IRMA)	4
Latvia (Latvijas Top 40)	33
Scottish Singles Sales (Official Charts)	2
UK Singles (Official Charts)	3
UK Airplay (Music Week)	13

=== Year-end charts ===
Year-end chart performance for "Sleeping with the Light On"
Chart (2003)	Position
Ireland (IRMA)	83
UK Singles (OCC)	86

== Certifications ==
Certifications for "Sleeping with the Light On"
Region	Certification	Certified units/sales
United Kingdom (BPI)	Silver	200,000^{‡}
^{‡} Sales+streaming figures based on certification alone.
