= Busted (2002 Busted album) =

- Band members left to right: Matt Willis, Charlie Simpson and James Bourne.

Studio album by Busted
- Released: 30 September 2002
- Recorded: 2002
- Genres: Pop rock; teen pop; pop punk; pop
- Length: 37:17
- Label: Universal Island
- Producers: Steve Robson; James Bourne

Busted chronology
| Busted (2002) | A Present for Everyone (2003) |

Singles from Busted
- 1. "What I Go to School For" Released: 16 September 2002; 2. "Year 3000" Released: 13 January 2003; 3. "You Said No (a.k.a. Crash and Burn)" Released: 21 April 2003; 4. "Hurra, hurra, die Schule brennt" Released: 21 April 2003; 5. "Sleeping with the Light On" Released: 11 August 2003

Alternative cover
- Japanese artwork for Busted

Busted is the self-titled debut album by English pop rock band Busted. It was released in the UK on 30 September 2002 and peaked at number 2 the following January after the success of second single "Year 3000", which reached number 2 on the UK Singles Chart. Five singles were released from the album: "What I Go to School For", "Year 3000", "You Said No", "Hurra, hurra, die Schule brennt" (released in continental Europe only) and "Sleeping with the Light On".

Busted was the 9th best-selling album of 2003 in the UK. The album has sold over 1.2 million copies and been certified as 4× Platinum in the UK. The album spent 77 weeks on the UK Top 75 Albums chart.

Both "What I Go to School For" and "Year 3000" were covered by the Jonas Brothers, and released on their 2006 album It's About Time.

== Background ==
With the original line-up of Busted having broken up in 2001, guitarist James Bourne and bassist Matt Willis set about finding a new band member. Charlie Simpson and Tom Fletcher both originally made it in, but the latter was cut from the final lineup.

Six tracks on the album were co-written with John McLaughlin and Steve Robson, who often collaborate with each other. The other remaining songs were written by the band themselves.

== Singles ==
The first single released from Busted was "What I Go to School For", which reached number 3. This was followed by "Year 3000", which reached number 2, "You Said No" and "Sleeping with the Light On". "You Said No" peaked at number 1 and "Sleeping with the Light On" peaked at number 3. With "You Said No", Busted entered the Guinness World Records for being the first artist to have their first three singles enter the top three of the UK Singles Chart in ascending order.

A European-only single, "Hurra, hurra, die Schule brennt", was released on the same date as "You Said No" was released in the UK.

"You Said No" is titled "Crash and Burn" on the original album release, but its title was changed for the single release because of the Space Shuttle Columbia disaster. In an interview with Newsround, Willis said, "We were deciding what single to go for just as that happened and we really wanted to use Crash and Burn but we thought the name was inappropriate - it would have been bad taste." Simpson also stated in 2016 that "we thought it was a bit insensitive around 9/11."

On the cassette release of the album, "Losing You" is advertised as a single. However, the song never was released as a single, and it is unknown whether it was planned to be or if this was a mistake. In 2018, Willis said that they would never play the song live, stating "We've never played that song. For a very good reason – we don't like it. It's not very good, it's quite embarrassing."

== Reception ==
Professional ratings
Review scores
| Source | Rating |
|---|---|
| AllMusic | 2.0/5 stars |
| Melodic | 2/5 stars |

AllMusic states: "[Busted] slide smoothly between... dull teen pop ballads with the sickeningly overwrought vocals typical of the genre... and relatively more creative stuff that punches up the formula with pop-ternative production and smirking, yet still squeaky clean lyrical witticisms. At best it's BBMak with better cheekbones; at worst, Busted is a neutered Sum 41". On bbc.co.uk, Jacqueline Hodges wrote: "Think a younger, British Wheatus or Blink-182 junior and you will be along the right lines. Their cheeky and geeky Green Day-type lyrics... are endearingly refreshing in these days of Gareth Gates and Ronan Keating mush". Q was more positive, Dan Stubbs writing: "Tales of copping off, time travel and a five-fingered fantasy about a schoolteacher with a nice bottom are delivered through inspired one-liners and clever gimmicks".

== B-sides ==
Busted recorded a number of B-sides for their album campaign, including a number of classic covers, including cover versions of "Brown Eyed Girl", "Fun Fun Fun" and "Mrs Robinson", as well as new tracks including "Late Night Sauna", "My Good Friend" and "Last Summer", as well as the demo version of "Year 3000". The version of "Year 3000" which appears as the B-side to "Sleeping with the Light On" is the version which the band presented to Universal Music before they were signed by the label. "My Good Friend" has never been released on CD, and only appears on the cassette release of "You Said No", becoming one of the rarest Busted tracks around. The demo version of "Year 3000" was also only released on cassette, meaning it is also very rare and hard to find.

== Track listing ==
Busted — Standard edition
| No. | Title | Writer(s) | Producer(s) | Length |
|---|---|---|---|---|
| 1. | "What I Go to School For" | James Bourne; Charlie Simpson; Matt Willis; John McLaughlin; Steve Robson | Steve Robson | 3:30 |
| 2. | "You Said No" | Bourne; Simpson; Willis; McLaughlin; Robson; Richard Mark Rashman | Robson | 2:47 |
| 3. | "Britney" | Bourne; McLaughlin; Robson | Robson | 3:31 |
| 4. | "Losing You" | Bourne; Simpson; Willis; McLaughlin; Robson | Robson | 3:54 |
| 5. | "Year 3000" | Bourne; Simpson; Willis; Robson; Tom Fletcher | Robson | 3:17 |
| 6. | "Psycho Girl" | Bourne; Rashman | Robson | 3:51 |
| 7. | "All the Way" | Simpson; Bourne | Robson | 2:26 |
| 8. | "Sleeping with the Light On" | Bourne; Willis | Robson | 3:38 |
| 9. | "Dawson’s Geek" | Bourne; Simpson; Willis | Robson | 2:27 |
| 10. | "Without You" | Simpson; Robson | Robson | 4:09 |
| 11. | "Loser Kid" | Bourne; Simpson; Willis | Robson | 3:48 |
| Total length: | | | | 45:57 |

Busted — British and Japanese special edition bonus tracks
| No. | Title | Writer(s) | Producer(s) | Length |
|---|---|---|---|---|
| 10. | "When Day Turns into Night" | Simpson • Bourne | Steve Robson | 3:35 |
| 11. | "Everything I Knew" | Bourne • Willis | Steve Robson | 3:10 |
| 13. | "Extra Exceedingly Fitness" (Interlude) | Bourne • Simpson | James Bourne | 0:18 |
| Total length: | | | | 52:28 |

Busted — German edition bonus track
| No. | Title | Writer(s) | Producer(s) | Length |
|---|---|---|---|---|
| 12. | "Hurra, hurra, die Schule brennt" | Schlasse • Klein • Hönig • Larson • Möller | Steve Robson | 3:35 |

- "You Said No" was originally titled "Crash and Burn" prior to the album's re-issue.

== Personnel ==
Credits adapted from Tidal.

=== Musicians ===
Busted

- Charlie Simpson – lead vocals (all)
- James Bourne – lead vocals (all), guitar (1, 3)
- Matt Willis – lead vocals (all), bass (all)

Additional musicians

- Paul Gendler – guitar (1, 6, 7, 11), backing vocals (all)
- Neil Taylor – guitar (2, 4)
- Steve Sidelnyk – drums (1)
- Symon Ingerfield – drums (3)
- Rheinallt "Reg" AP Gwynedd – bass guitar (7)
- Brian Wright – violin (4, 10)
- Sally Herbert – violin (4, 10)
- Ellen Blair – viola (4, 10)
- Marcus Holdaway – cello (4, 10)
- Sean O'Hagan – string arranger (10)

=== Technical ===
- John McLaughlin – producer (all)
- Steve Robson – producer (all), keyboards (1), mixer (6), string arranger (10)
- Sidh Solanki – programming (1, 2, 11)
- Syze Up – programming (3, 5)
- Tom Elmhirst – mixing (1–3, 5, 7–9, 11)
- Jeremy Wheatley – mixing (4)

== Charts ==
=== Weekly charts ===
| Chart (2002–03) | Peak position |
|---|---|
| Austrian Albums (Ö3 Austria) | 19 |
| Danish Albums (Hitlisten) | 9 |
| Dutch Albums (Album Top 100) | 51 |
| European Albums Chart | 11 |
| French Albums (SNEP) | 57 |
| German Albums (Offizielle Top 100) | 43 |
| Irish Albums (IRMA) | 5 |
| Japanese Albums (Oricon) | 25 |
| Scottish Albums (Official Charts) | 1 |
| Swiss Albums (Schweizer Hitparade) | 88 |
| UK Albums (Official Charts) | 2 |
| UK Album Downloads (Official Charts) | 26 |
| UK Independent Albums (Official Charts) | 13 |

=== Year-end charts ===
| Chart (2003) | Position |
|---|---|
| Danish Albums (Hitlisten) | 75 |
| UK Albums (OCC) | 9 |

| Chart (2004) | Position |
|---|---|
| UK Albums (OCC) | 113 |

== Certifications ==
| Region | Certification | Certified units/sales |
|---|---|---|
| Japan (RIAJ) | Gold | 100,000^{^} |
| United Kingdom (BPI) | 4× Platinum | 1,200,000^{‡} |
Summaries
| Europe (IFPI) | Platinum | 1,000,000^{*} |
^{*} Sales figures based on certification alone.^{^} Shipments figures based on certification alone.^{‡} Sales+streaming figures based on certification alone.
