= A Present for Everyone =

Studio album by Busted
- Released: 17 November 2003
- Recorded: 2003
- Genres: Pop punk; power pop; pop rock; pop
- Length: 45:57
- Label: Universal Island
- Producers: Steve Power; The Matrix; Graeme Stewart

Busted chronology
Busted (2002)	A Present for Everyone (2003)	Busted (2004)

Singles from A Present for Everyone
- 1. "Crashed the Wedding" Released: 8 November 2003; 2. "Who's David" Released: 16 February 2004; 3. "Air Hostess" Released: 26 April 2004; 4. "Thunderbirds / 3AM" Released: 26 July 2004; 5. "She Wants to Be Me" Released: 29 November 2004

Alternative cover
- 2004 special edition re-issue cover

A Present for Everyone is the second studio album by English pop punk band Busted. It was released on 17 November 2003 by Universal Island Records and features a sound mixing pop punk and power pop material with traditional pop rock. Five singles were released from the album, including the number-one hits "Crashed the Wedding", "Who's David" and "Thunderbirds / 3AM".

The album received generally positive reviews from music critics. It debuted and peaked at number 2 on the UK Albums Chart and has been certified 3× Platinum by the British Phonographic Industry for sales of over 900,000. A Present for Everyone was Busted's final album until they reformed in 2015 and released their third album Night Driver.

== Background ==
The album was originally intended to be titled Drum Roll, and was referred to as such in press releases and interviews up until October of that year. Matt Willis said in an interview on Popworld that it was called A Present for Everyone because "it is actually a present for - everyone". The album showed a more mature sound compared to their debut album. Eight of the thirteen standard edition tracks were co-written with Tom Fletcher from McFly, a band which Bourne helped form following Fletcher's departure from Busted in the early days of the band. "She Wants to Be Me" and "3am" were co-written with production team The Matrix, which showed a slight departure in sound for the band, venturing more into pop punk.

"Fake" and "Better Than This" were collaborations between Willis, Guy Chambers and Steve Power, and both were hailed as stand-out tracks on the album in critical reviews. Bourne and Neve guitarist Michael Raphael wrote "Can't Break Thru", while Simpson co-wrote "Why" with his brother Will. "Why" shows a much heavier rock sound, similar to that of Simpson's future project Fightstar, for which he later left Busted to commit to full-time. Simpson later hailed "Why" as his favourite Busted song of all time. "Better Than This", "Why" and "Can't Break Thru" have solo vocal performances from those who wrote them.

== Singles ==
- "Crashed the Wedding" was released as the album's lead single in November 2003, debuting atop the UK Singles Chart and becoming Busted's second UK number-one single.
- "Who's David?" was released in February 2004.
- "Air Hostess" was released in April 2004. The track "Shipwrecked in Atlantis" from the band's fourth album, Half Way There (2019) is a continuation of "Air Hostess".
- "3AM" was released as a double A-side in July 2004 and became the band's fourth chart-topper.

The fifth and final single was "She Wants to Be Me", which was released in November 2004 as a 3" CD. It was banned from charting, however, as the Official Charts Company's then-rules prevented songs of that format from charting.

- "3AM" was issued as a double A-side with "Thunderbirds Are Go" (simply titled "Thunderbirds" upon single release), which was included on the 2004 reissue of the album and the soundtrack to the film of the same name. The 2004 re-issue of the album also includes various other popular Busted singles, and only includes three non-single tracks from the original album. The Japanese deluxe edition of the album includes a bonus DVD containing five music videos and an additional EPK for Japan.

== Critical reception ==
Professional ratings
Review scores
Source	Rating
AbsolutePunk	8.2/10
AllMusic	3/5 stars
BBC Music	(positive)
entertainment.ie	3/5 stars
The Guardian	2/5 stars
Melodic	2.5/5 stars
Stylus Magazine	C
Ultimate Guitar Archive	9/10 stars

Critical reaction to the album was generally positive. On BBC Music, Nikki Smith wrote: "They far outshine their boy band competitors, not just because of their ability to play instruments but also for the sheer energy and enthusiasm that comes through in their music". AllMusic stated: "Though it's way too long at fifteen tracks, the album at least sticks to its template of earnest, slightly bawdy tales of boys and girls wrapped around peppy, ultra-slick, and sickeningly in-the-moment guitar pop."

AbsolutePunk's Broden Terry called the album "one of the better pop releases in recent memory" and added: "I'd recommend giving A Present for Everyone a listen because rarely has music ever been and sounded so fun." In a negative review, Sputnikmusic said, "Leaving behind the more boy band influenced sound of their debut and becoming something closer to a wannabe Blink-182 was a big step for them, unfortunately it doesn’t seem to work, with the overall album just sounding like a neutered Sum 41."

== Chart performance ==
Despite being highly anticipated, the album debuted at number two on the UK Albums Chart. It was held off the top spot by Michael Jackson's greatest hits album, Number Ones, with the latter winning out by less than 600 copies. A Present for Everyone was the 19th best-selling album of 2003 in the UK, and has been certified 3× Platinum by the British Phonographic Industry (BPI) for sales of over 900,000. It has sold over 1,000,000 copies to date.

== B-sides ==
The band covered a variety of popular tracks as B-sides for the singles from the album. The band recorded covers of "Build Me Up Buttercup", "That's Entertainment", "Hark! The Herald Angels Sing", "O Holy Night", "Teenage Kicks", "Where Is the Love?", "Fall at Your Feet", "Peaches" and "Runaway Train", as well as new tracks "Let it Go" and "Mummy Trade", which appeared as B-sides to "Air Hostess". The band's cover of "Teenage Kicks" was later included on their debut US release, as well as the re-issue of A Present in 2004. "Build Me Up Buttercup" is the second of the band's ongoing collaborations with McFly, following the release of "Lola" in 2004.

== Track listing ==
A Present for Everyone — Standard edition
No.	Title	Writer(s)	Producer(s)	Length
1.	"Air Hostess"	James Bourne; Tom Fletcher; Charlie Simpson; Matt Willis	Steve Power	3:57
2.	"Crashed the Wedding"	Bourne; Fletcher	Power	2:39
3.	"Who's David"	Bourne; Fletcher	Power	3:31
4.	"She Wants to Be Me"	Bourne; Simpson; Willis; Graham Edwards; Scott Spock; Lauren Christy	The Matrix	3:23
5.	"3AM"	Bourne; Simpson; Willis; Edwards; Spock; Christy	The Matrix	3:39
6.	"That Thing You Do"	Bourne; Fletcher; Simpson	Power	3:24
7.	"Over Now"	Bourne; Fletcher	Power	3:53
8.	"Fake"	Willis; Power; Guy Chambers	Power	3:25
9.	"Meet You There"	Bourne; Simpson	Power	3:06
10.	"Why"	Simpson; Will Simpson	Graeme Stewart	4:47
11.	"Better Than This"	Willis; Power; Chambers	Power	3:55
12.	"Can't Break Thru"	Bourne; Michael Raphael	Power	4:13
13.	"Nerdy"	Bourne; Fletcher; Simpson	Power	3:45
Total length:				45:57

A Present for Everyone — British and Japanese special edition bonus tracks
No.	Title	Writer(s)	Producer(s)	Length
6.	"Falling for You"	Bourne; Fletcher; Simpson	Power	3:01
11.	"Loner in Love"	Bourne	Power	3:57
Total length:				54:45

A Present for Everyone — Japanese special edition bonus DVD
No.	Title	Director(s)	Length
1.	"Crashed the Wedding"	Max and Dania	2:50
2.	"What I Go to School For"	Alison Murray	3:35
3.	"You Said No"	Jon Riche	3:00
4.	"Year 3000"	Dougal Wilson and Tom Gravestock	3:40
5.	"Sleeping with the Light On"	Sven Harding	4:05
6.	"EPK for Japan"	Unknown	7:00
Total length:			25:05

2004 special edition re-issue
No.	Title	Writer(s)	Producer(s)	Length
1.	"Air Hostess"	Bourne, Fletcher	Steve Power	3:57
2.	"What I Go to School For" (Steve Power version)	Bourne,Willis,	Steve Robson, Steve Power	3:30
3.	"Crashed the Wedding"	Bourne	Steve Power	2:39
4.	"Who's David" (Single version)	Bourne	Steve Power	3:31
5.	"She Wants to Be Me"	Bourne, Simpson, Willis	The Matrix	3:23
6.	"3AM" (Single version)	Bourne, Simpson	The Matrix	3:39
7.	"Teenage Kicks"	John O'Neill	Steve Power	2:23
8.	"Falling for You"	Bourne, Willis	Steve Power	3:01
9.	"Thunderbirds"	Bourne	Steve Power	2:59
10.	"That Thing You Do"	Bourne	Steve Power	3:24
11.	"Meet You There"	Bourne, Simpson	Steve Power	3:06
12.	"Nerdy"	Bourne, Fletcher	Steve Power	3:45
Total length:				43:02

== Personnel ==
Credits adapted from Tidal.

=== Musicians ===
Busted

- Charlie Simpson – vocals (1-10, 13), guitars (1, 2, 9, 10)
- James Bourne – vocals (1-9, 12, 13), rhythm guitar (1, 2, 9, 12), piano (9)
- Matt Willis – vocals (1-9, 11, 13)

Additional musicians

- Tim Vanderkuil – guitars (1-3, 6-8, 11-13), bass (1-4, 6-8, 11, 13), keyboards (8, 12)
- Dave Stewart – keyboards (1–3, 6, 7, 9, 13)
- Andy Duncan – drum programmer (1–3, 6, 13), percussion (1–3, 6, 13)
- Jeremy Stacey – drums (1–3, 6, 7, 13)
- Nick Ingman – string arranger (3, 7, 13)
- Victor Indrizzo – drums (4, 5)
- Ash Howes – keyboards (5)
- Martin Harrington – guitar (5)
- Steve Power – electric guitar (8), strings (12)
- Damon Wilson – drums (8, 11, 12)
- Rob Johnson – guitar (10)
- Robin Mullarkey – bass guitar (10)
- Jed Lynch – drums (10)
- James Bailes – bass guitar (11, 12)
- Michael Raphael – guitar (12), keyboards (12)

=== Production ===
- Steve Power – producer (1–3, 6–9, 11–13)
- The Matrix – producer (4, 5)
- Ash Howes – producer (5)
- Martin Harrington – producer (5)
- Graeme Stewart – producer (10)

== Charts ==
=== Weekly charts ===
Chart (2003)	Peak position
Danish Albums (Hitlisten)	33
European Albums Chart	11
German Albums (Offizielle Top 100)	85
Irish Albums (IRMA)	9
Japanese Albums (Oricon)	16
Scottish Albums (OCC)	1
Spanish Albums (PROMUSICAE)	64
UK Albums (OCC)	2

=== Year-end charts ===
Chart (2003)	Position
UK Albums (OCC)	19

Chart (2004)	Position
UK Albums (OCC)	60

== Certifications ==
Region	Certification	Certified units/sales
Japan (RIAJ)	Gold	100,000^{^}
United Kingdom (BPI)	3× Platinum	1,089,199
Summaries
Europe (IFPI)	Platinum	1,000,000^{*}
^{*} Sales figures based on certification alone.^{^} Shipments figures based on certification alone.
