= Year 3000 =

2003 single by Busted

- CD1 cover

Single by Busted

from the album Busted
- B-side: "Fun, Fun, Fun"; "Late Night Sauna"
- Released: 13 January 2003
- Length: 3:18
- Label: Universal; Polygram
- Songwriters: James Bourne; Charlie Simpson; Steve Robson; Matt Willis
- Producer: Steve Robson

Busted singles chronology
"What I Go to School For" (2002)	"Year 3000" (2003)	"You Said No" (2003)

Alternative cover
- CD2 cover

Music video
- "Year 3000" on YouTube

"Year 3000" is a song performed by British pop rock band Busted, released on 13 January 2003 as the second single from their self-titled debut studio album (2002).

"Year 3000" reached number two on the UK Singles Chart and became the 34th-biggest seller of 2003 with 165,000 units. The single was also successful in the rest of Europe, reaching number two on the Irish Singles Chart and the top 10 in Belgium, Denmark, Iceland, and the Netherlands.

The song has been covered by US pop band Jonas Brothers, with whom Busted recorded another version for their 2023 compilation album, Greatest Hits 2.0.

== Background ==
The idea for "Year 3000" came from Busted member James Bourne's obsession with the 1985 film Back to the Future, hence the references to the flux capacitor and the fact that the time machine mentioned is "like the one in a film I've seen". Bourne has stated that the song was also inspired by Robbie Williams's 1998 hit "Millennium"; in a video posted on TikTok on July 28, 2023, he further explained that in 2000, he and Matt Willis were inspired to compose the song by overhearing "Millennium" playing on MTV in an adjacent room.

The song is written in the key of B major.

== Chart performance ==
"Year 3000" debuted at number two on the UK Singles Chart, one place higher than their past single "What I Go to School For". It was kept off number one by "Stop Living the Lie" by Fame Academy winner David Sneddon. Though it never reached number one, it ended up outselling both their number ones that year.

== Music video ==
The music video, partly filmed at Upstairs at The Garage in London and directed by Tom Gravestock through Passion Pictures London, begins with Matt Willis playing a video game called Stay Alive. When he loses, the video zooms out to view the band playing the song's intro in a bedroom. After Charlie Simpson starts singing, they hear an explosion-like sound outside. They look out of a window to the backyard and find their neighbour Peter, played by James Bourne's brother Chris, standing next to a Vauxhall Viva customised like the DeLorean time machine from Back to the Future. They get in the car and Peter takes them to the future. The song continues as the band goes through a time vortex, and arrives in the year 3000. They see many changes, such as various aliens, flying cars and the fact that everyone now lives under the ocean. They also see three triple-breasted women, one of whom throws her bra towards the trio for them to fight over.

As the song continues, the band looks at a billboard and notice older versions of themselves in a police lineup. James and Matt are embarrassed with their future selves, but Charlie nods in appreciation and looks relatively happy with his. At the song's bridge, the band comes across a concert hall with a sign saying "Busted, Live Tonight". They sneak in, lock their older selves inside a dressing room and jump onto the stage, where the song continues in front of an audience. At the closing of the song, the setting switches back and forth from the concert to the bedroom from the video's intro, and ends with Busted jumping into their logo.

== Usage in media ==
The original Busted version features in the final episode of the 26th season of the US animated sitcom The Simpsons, entitled "Mathlete's Feat".

The original Busted version features in the 2024 British comedy Time Travel Is Dangerous over the animated end credits of the movie.

== Track listing ==
CD 1
No.	Title	Writer(s)	Length
1.	"Year 3000" (Single version)	James Bourne; Charlie Simpson; Steve Robson; Matt Willis	3:20
2.	"Year 3000" (Acoustic version)	Bourne; Robson; Simpson; Willis	2:59
3.	"Year 3000" (DJEJ remix)	Bourne; Robson; Simpson; Willis	3:32
4.	"Year 3000" (Instrumental)	Bourne; Robson; Simpson; Willis	3:16
5.	"Year 3000" (Video)
Total length:			13:07 (audio)

CD 2
No.	Title	Writer(s)	Length
1.	"Year 3000" (Single version)	James Bourne; Charlie Simpson; Steve Robson; Matt Willis	3:20
2.	"Fun, Fun, Fun"	Brian Wilson; Mike Love	2:16
3.	"Late Night Sauna"	Bourne; Robson; Simpson; Willis	3:32
4.	"What I Go to School For" (Video showcase)		1:58
5.	"Year 3000" (Animatic)		3:17
Total length:			13:06

== Charts ==
=== Weekly charts ===
Weekly chart performance for "Year 3000"
Chart (2003)	Peak position
Australia (ARIA)	42
Austria (Ö3 Austria Top 40)	15
Belgium (Ultratop 50 Flanders)	5
Belgium (Ultratip Bubbling Under Wallonia)	2
Denmark (Tracklisten)	10
Denmark Airplay (Tracklisten)	8
Europe (Eurochart Hot 100)	10
Europe (European Hit Radio)	20
France (SNEP)	45
Germany (GfK)	21
Hungary (Rádiós Top 40)	40
Iceland (Tónlist)	4
Ireland (IRMA)	2
Netherlands (Dutch Top 40)	5
Netherlands (Single Top 100)	7
Netherlands Airplay (Music & Media)	16
Norway (VG-lista)	19
Scottish Singles Sales (Official Charts)	2
Switzerland (Schweizer Hitparade)	48
UK Singles (Official Charts)	2
UK Airplay (Music Week)	20

=== Year-end charts ===
Year-end chart performance for "Year 3000"
Chart (2003)	Position
Belgium (Ultratop Flanders)	45
Ireland (IRMA)	15
Netherlands (Dutch Top 40)	37
Netherlands (Single Top 100)	58
UK Singles (OCC)	34

== Certifications ==
Region	Certification	Certified units/sales
Denmark (IFPI Danmark)	Gold	45,000^{‡}
New Zealand (RMNZ)	Gold	15,000^{‡}
United Kingdom (BPI)	2× Platinum	1,200,000^{‡}
^{‡} Sales+streaming figures based on certification alone.

== Jonas Brothers version ==
"Year 3000"

Single by Jonas Brothers

from the album It's About Time and Jonas Brothers
- Released: May 16, 2006
- Length: 3:20
- Label: Hollywood
- Songwriters: Bourne; Simpson; Robson; Willis
- Producer: Eric Valentine

Jonas Brothers singles chronology
"Mandy" (2006)	"Year 3000" (2006)	"Hold On" (2007)

Music video
- "Year 3000" on YouTube

"Year 3000"
A 20 second sample of "Year 3000" by Jonas Brothers, where a portion of the chorus is heard.

In 2006, the Jonas Brothers recorded a cover of "Year 3000". Since the song would be played on Radio Disney, all the sexually-suggestive lyrics were simplified – the line "and your great-great-great granddaughter is pretty fine" is changed to "doin' fine" and "Triple-breasted women swim around town, totally naked" is changed to "girls there, with round hair like Star Wars, float above the floor." Also, the line "Everybody bought our seventh album, it had outsold Michael Jackson" is changed to "it had outsold Kelly Clarkson".

=== Chart performance ===
After the song's release in early 2007, the song debuted at #40 on the Billboard Hot 100. "Year 3000" was the group's first single to chart and their first Top 40 hit. The song eventually peaked at #31 and sold 1,050,000 copies in America. The group's cover was the first single they released under Disney's Hollywood Records, and it was the only song Hollywood received distribution rights to after the group was dropped from Columbia. It was re-released as the lead single from their next album, Jonas Brothers on March 13, 2007.

=== Music video ===
The music video for the Jonas Brothers' cover was directed by Andrew Bennett and produced by Justin Cronkite, visual effects were designed by Trance. It was shot in 2006. It begins with the band entering a decorated garage, which includes posters of the band's labelmates at the time with Sony BMG, including Incubus, Augustana, Aqualung, Cartel, Cheyenne Kimball, System of a Down, Foo Fighters, John Mayer, and more. where they take their instruments: Nick and Kevin pick guitars, and Joe first plays the keyboard, then uses a microphone. As they play the intro, Nick comes home on a bike. He starts singing while the video's story side views him noticing a flash of light next door. He goes over there, and is joined by Joe and Kevin. Their neighbour "Peter" shows them that he made a time machine. However, this one is different from the one in Busted's video. This one is Pete's sofa rather than the car. While they continue to play the song, they enter the time machine, and when in the year 3000 they are in an all-white room. There they see girls with round, pink hair instead of three triple-breasted girls in Busted's.

At the bridge, the girls show the band their 7th album, and the album by Kelly Clarkson that their album outsold rather than Michael Jackson. Later, one of the girls shows Joe the city on the outside, while another shows Kevin the band's "great-great-great granddaughters". Towards the end of the song, the brothers jump into the time machine and return to their own time. At the end of the song, Nick sings, while Joe claps the rhythm and Kevin plays the ending riff on his guitar. It premiered on Disney Channel in January 2007.

=== Response from Busted ===
In November 2016, in an interview with PopBuzz, Busted were asked what they thought of the Jonas Brothers' cover of the song. Matt Willis responded: "Dude, they paid my mortgage for four years, I'm stoked to bits. Thank you very much Jonas Brothers," whilst James Bourne said, "The thing about it is that...when I heard their version of it, I didn't really like it. But there has been some really good things that have happened as a result of it. I didn't like how they changed words around. But the thing is, what's mental is that "Year 3000" was synced in The Simpsons [episode "Mathlete's Feat"] recently...But the thing is, when I asked them to do that, they already had chosen to use the original version. And [...] I don't think they'd have been aware of the song if that hadn't have happened. So we ended up getting our version on The Simpsons which was cool. If someone had said to me all those years ago 'if you let them do it you'll get your song on The Simpsons' I would have done it immediately."

On 10 June 2019, Busted and the Jonas Brothers performed the song together live at Capital FM's Summertime Ball at Wembley Stadium.

=== Charts ===
Chart performance for "Year 3000"
Chart (2007–2008)	Peak position
Australia (ARIA)	72
US Billboard Hot 100	31
US Pop 100 (Billboard)	33
Venezuela Pop Rock (Record Report)	20

=== Certifications ===
Certifications for "Year 3000"
Region	Certification	Certified units/sales
Canada (Music Canada)	Gold	40,000^{‡}
^{‡} Sales+streaming figures based on certification alone.

== 2023 version ==
"Year 3000 2.0"

Single by Busted and Jonas Brothers

from the album Greatest Hits 2.0
- Released: 28 July 2023
- Length: 3:17
- Label: Island
- Songwriters: James Bourne; Mattie Jay; Charlie Simpson; Steve Robson
- Producer: Phil Gornell

Busted singles chronology
"Crashed the Wedding 2.0" (2023)	"Year 3000 2.0" (2023)

Jonas Brothers singles chronology
"Do It Like That" (2023)	"Year 3000 2.0" (2023)	"Strong Enough" (2023)

Lyric video
- "Year 3000 2.0" on YouTube

On 28 July 2023, Busted and the Jonas Brothers released a collaborative version of the song, titled "Year 3000 2.0". It is part of Busted's greatest hits, which consists of re-recordings of tracks from their first two albums, Busted (2002) and A Present for Everyone (2003), duetted with other pop punk and pop rock artists and bands, including the Jonas Brothers. The new version features freshly recorded vocals from the artists.

=== Lyric video ===
On July 27, 2023, a lyric video for the song was uploaded to Busted's YouTube channel, featuring clips from both bands amidst the lyrics "with newly filmed black and white shots and graphics which were intercut with footage of both bands from their original music videos".

=== Charts ===
Chart performance for "Year 3000 2.0"
Chart (2023)	Peak position
UK Singles Downloads (Official Charts)	28
UK Singles Sales (OCC)	29
