= Crashed the Wedding =

2003 single by Busted

- CD1 cover

Single by Busted

from the album A Present for Everyone
- B-side: "Build Me Up Buttercup"; "That's Entertainment"; "Hark! The Herald Angels Sing"; "Hurra, hurra, die Schule brennt"
- Released: 8 November 2003
- Length: 2:39
- Label: Universal; Island
- Songwriters: James Bourne; Tom Fletcher
- Producer: Steve Power

Busted singles chronology
"Sleeping with the Light On" (2003)	"Crashed the Wedding" (2003)	"Who's David" (2004)

"Crashed the Wedding"
- CD2 cover

Music video
- "Crashed the Wedding" on YouTube

"Crashed the Wedding" is a song by English pop punk band Busted. It was written by James Bourne and McFly's Tom Fletcher and produced by Steve Power. It was released in Japan on 8 November 2003 and in the United Kingdom on 10 November as the lead single from Busted's second studio album, A Present for Everyone (2003).

"Crashed the Wedding" became Busted's second single to reach number one on the UK Singles Chart, with first week sales of 55,000, as well as the final UK number one single to be available on cassette. The song is loosely based on the wedding scene in the 1967 film The Graduate and the line "I'm so rushed off my feet, looking for Gordon Street" is a reference to the 1993 film Wayne's World 2. The song was nominated for the People's Choice Award at the 2004 Music Vision Awards.

== Music video ==
Charlie Simpson (pictured with James Bourne) wore drag for both the "Crashed the Wedding" music video, and the 2018 "Nineties" music video.

The music video, which is all one shot, features Busted playing at a wedding in which nearly all the guests are portrayed by the band members. Busted then go on to destroy the wedding, wrecking the cake and knocking over tables. A scene involving one character spanking another was edited out when the video was aired during the daytime. Before the song begins, a muzak version of Busted's first single "What I Go to School For" is heard. Willis, Bourne and Simpson portray Adam Ant, Michael Jackson and Boy George impersonators, respectively. Harry Judd from McFly plays the drummer in the video.

== Live performances ==
The single was also promoted by appearances on Top of the Pops, Top of the Pops Saturday, CD:UK, Popworld, the Royal Variety Performance, Ant & Dec's Saturday Night Takeaway, and as one of the interval acts at Junior Eurovision Song Contest 2003.

== Since release ==
In 2011, the single was chosen by listeners on BBC Radio 1's request show. The song was then campaigned to become the 2011 Christmas number one on Facebook.

== Track listings ==
UK CD1
No.	Title	Length
1.	"Crashed the Wedding"
2.	"Build Me Up Buttercup" (collaboration with McFly)
3.	"That's Entertainment"
4.	"Crashed the Wedding" (video)
5.	"Exclusive Tour Footage"

UK CD2
No.	Title	Length
1.	"Crashed the Wedding"
2.	"Hark! The Herald Angels Sing"
3.	"Hurra, hurra, die Schule brennt" (video)

UK cassette single
No.	Title	Length
1.	"Crashed the Wedding"
2.	"Hark! The Herald Angels Sing"
3.	"Hurra, hurra, die Schule brennt"

European CD single
No.	Title	Length
1.	"Crashed the Wedding"
2.	"Build Me Up Buttercup" (collaboration with McFly)

Japanese CD single
No.	Title	Length
1.	"Crashed the Wedding"
2.	"Build Me Up Buttercup" (collaboration with McFly)
3.	"That's Entertainment"
4.	"Hark! The Herald Angels Sing"
5.	"Hurra, hurra, die Schule brennt"

== Personnel ==
Personnel are taken from the A Present for Everyone album booklet.

- James Bourne – writing
- Tom Fletcher – writing
- Steve Power – production, mixing, programming
- Jim Brumby – engineering
- David Naughton – engineering
- Dan Porter – mixing assistant, assistant recording engineer

== Charts ==
=== Weekly charts ===
Weekly chart performance for "Crashed the Wedding"
Chart (2003–2004)	Peak position
Austria (Ö3 Austria Top 40)	70
Belgium (Ultratip Bubbling Under Flanders)	8
Denmark (Tracklisten)	3
Europe (Eurochart Hot 100)	6
Germany (GfK)	45
Ireland (IRMA)	3
Latvia (Latvijas Top 40)	34
Netherlands (Dutch Top 40 Tipparade)	4
Netherlands (Single Top 100)	28
Romania (Romanian Top 100)	98
Scottish Singles Sales (Official Charts)	1
Spain (Promusicae)	6
Spain Airplay (Top 40 Radio)	17
Switzerland (Schweizer Hitparade)	59
UK Singles (Official Charts)	1
UK Airplay (Music Week)	23

=== Year-end charts ===
Year-end chart performance for "Crashed the Wedding"
Chart (2003)	Position
Ireland (IRMA)	61
UK Singles (OCC)	48

== Certifications ==
Certifications for "Crashed the Wedding"
Region	Certification	Certified units/sales
United Kingdom (BPI)	Platinum	600,000^{‡}
^{‡} Sales+streaming figures based on certification alone.

== Release history ==
Release dates and formats for "Crashed the Wedding
Region	Date	Format(s)	Label(s)	Ref.
Japan	8 November 2003	CD	Universal Island	
United Kingdom	10 November 2003	CD; cassette	Universal; Island	

== 2023 version ==
On 23 June 2023, Busted released "Crashed the Wedding 2.0", in a collaboration with American band All Time Low. The single is expected to be included in their forthcoming studio album of remade Busted tracks.

Busted member Charlie Simpson said: "I've been listening to All Time Low since they released their debut EP Put Up or Shut Up back in 2006. It's so awesome to have them on board for reimagining one of our biggest songs." All Time Low added: "[We] had the pleasure of getting to know these guys when we worked together on a couple tracks for the McBusted album. Getting the call to come in and help recreate an iconic Busted song was a no-brainer. Loved being a part of this one!"
