= Thunderbirds / 3AM =

2004 single by Busted

"Thunderbirds" / "3AM"
- CD1 cover

Single by Busted

from the album A Present for Everyone (re-issue) and A Ticket for Everyone: Busted Live
- B-side: "Runaway Train"
- Released: 26 July 2004
- Genre: Pop-punk
- Length: 3:02 ("Thunderbirds"); 3:35 ("3AM")
- Label: Universal; Island
- Songwriters: James Bourne, Matt Willis, Charlie Simpson, Tom Fletcher, Barry Gray ("Thunderbirds"); Lauren Christy, Scott Spock, Graham Edwards, Charlie Simpson, James Bourne ("3AM")
- Producers: Steve Power ("Thunderbirds"); The Matrix ("3AM")

Busted singles chronology
"Air Hostess" (2004)	"Thunderbirds" / "3AM" (2004)	"She Wants to Be Me" (2004)

"3AM / Thunderbirds"
- CD2 cover

Music videos
- "Thunderbirds Are Go" on YouTube
- "3AM" on YouTube

"Thunderbirds" (titled "Thunderbirds Are Go" on some editions of the single and album) and "3AM" are two songs by English pop punk band Busted. The songs were issued as a double A-side single on 26 July 2004 as the fourth single from their second studio album, A Present for Everyone (2003). "Thunderbirds" was not originally included on the album, having been written specifically for the 2004 film Thunderbirds, although it later appeared on a re-issue of the album in Europe. "Thunderbirds" was not released on an album in the United Kingdom until the release of the group's live album A Ticket for Everyone: Busted Live in 2005.

"Thunderbirds" / "3AM" was Busted's last single to enter the UK Singles Chart until the release of "On What You're On" in 2016, reaching number one. It was the 19th-best-selling single of 2004 in the UK and also won the title of 2004 Record of the Year, and received an 8/10 rating from Stylus Magazine. "3AM" was later performed by Matt Willis during his 2007 solo tour, and by James Bourne on his 2012 acoustic solo tour.

== Track listings ==
UK CD1

1. "3AM" (live from tour)
2. "Thunderbirds"

UK CD2

1. "3AM" (radio edit)
2. "Thunderbirds"
3. "Runaway Train" (Soul Asylum cover)
4. "3AM" (acoustic version)
5. "Thunderbirds" (acoustic version)
6. "Busted in Japan" (Part 1)

UK DVD single

1. "3AM"
2. "Thunderbirds"
3. "Crashed the Wedding" (live audio mix from tour)
4. "Crashed the Wedding" (live footage from tour)
5. "Thunderbirds" (video)
6. "Busted in Japan" (Part 2)

Japanese CD single

1. "Thunderbirds"
2. "3AM"
3. "Runaway Train" (Soul Asylum cover)
4. "3AM" (acoustic version)
5. "Thunderbirds" (acoustic version)
6. "Thunderbirds" (video)
7. "Crashed the Wedding" (live footage from tour)

== Personnel ==
=== "Thunderbirds" ===
Personnel are taken from the A Ticket for Everyone: Busted Live album booklet.

- James Bourne – writing
- Matt Willis – writing
- Charlie Simpson – writing
- Tom Fletcher – writing
- Barry Gray – writing
- Steve Power – production
- Bob Clearmountain – mixing (at Mix This!, Pacific Palisades, California)
- Jim Brumby – Pro Tools engineering
- Kevin Harp – assistant engineering

=== "3AM" ===
Personnel are taken from the A Present for Everyone album booklet.

- The Matrix – production, arrangement, recording
  - Lauren Christy – writing
  - Scott Spock – writing
  - Graham Edwards – writing
- Charlie Simpson – writing
- James Bourne – writing
- Andrew Nast – production, arrangement, and recording assistant
- Steve Power – mixing
- Tim Young – mastering

== Charts ==
All entries charted as "Thunderbirds" except where noted.

=== Weekly charts ===
Weekly chart performance for "Thunderbirds / 3AM"
Chart (2004)	Peak position
Belgium (Ultratip Bubbling Under Flanders)	16
Europe (Eurochart Hot 100)	4
Germany (GfK)	92
Ireland (IRMA) "Thunderbirds" / "3AM"	6
Japan (Oricon)	50
Netherlands (Dutch Top 40 Tipparade)	16
Netherlands (Single Top 100)	72
Scottish Singles Sales (Official Charts) "Thunderbirds" / "3AM"	1
Spain Airplay (Top 40 Radio)	30
UK Singles (Official Charts) "Thunderbirds" / "3AM"	1
UK Airplay (Music Week)	50

=== Year-end charts ===
Year-end chart performance for "Thunderbirds / 3AM"
Chart (2004)	Position
UK Singles (OCC)	19

== Certifications ==
Certifications for "Thunderbirds / 3AM"
Region	Certification	Certified units/sales
United Kingdom (BPI)	Gold	400,000^{‡}
^{‡} Sales+streaming figures based on certification alone.

== Release history ==
Release dates and formats for "Thunderbirds / 3AM"
Region	Date	Format(s)	Label(s)	Ref.
United Kingdom	26 July 2004	CD	Universal; Island	
Japan	4 August 2004	CD	Universal Music Japan	
