= You Said No =

2003 single by Busted

Single by Busted

from the album Busted
- B-side: "Mrs Robinson"; "My Good Friend"
- Released: 21 April 2003
- Length: 2:47
- Label: Universal Island
- Songwriters: James Bourne; Matthew Jay; Charlie Simpson; Steve Robson; John McLaughlin
- Producer: Steve Robson

Busted singles chronology
"Year 3000" (2003)	"You Said No" (2003)	"Hurra, hurra, die Schule brennt" (2003)

"You Said No"
- CD2 cover

Music video
- "You Said No" on YouTube

"You Said No" (originally titled "Crash and Burn") is a song by English pop punk band Busted. It was released on 21 April 2003 as the third single from their debut studio album, Busted (2002). The song was written by band members James Bourne, and Charlie Simpson, and was produced by Robson and Graham Stewart. "You Said No" became Busted's first song to reach number one on the UK Singles Chart.

== Background ==
"You Said No" is about being rejected at a disco by a girl and feeling humiliated. The song was first recorded under the title "Crash and Burn", and this version was included on the first pressing of Busted. The title of the song was changed in the aftermath of the Columbia Shuttle disaster of February 2003, as the original name was deemed "inappropriate". In an interview with Newsround, Matt Willis said, "We were deciding what single to go for just as that happened and we really wanted to use Crash and Burn but we thought the name was inappropriate - it would have been bad taste." The song was renamed "You Said No", slightly reworked, and this version was subsequently released as a single and included on further pressings of Busted.

In 1000 UK Number One Hits by Jon Kutner and Spencer Leigh, James Bourne recalled: "I remember we sat down for a writing session and Charlie was talking about being blown out by a girl. He said 'I crashed and burned' which was something I had never heard before. Then we tied it in with a song we already had about a girl who was so fit and she knew it and we renamed it 'You Said No.'"

== Critical reception ==
In a review for the song, Music Week stated: "Self-deprecating and completely infectious, this will be all over the radio", while Scotland's Daily Record made it Single of the Week. UKMIX was less enthusiastic, regarding the song as "nowhere near as interesting as "Year 3000" or "What I Go to School For", but pretty amusing when you think about the bad lyrics".

== Chart performance ==
On 27 April 2003, "You Said No" debuted at number one on the UK Singles Chart, marking Busted's first number one on the chart. Additionally, with previous singles "What I Go to School For" and "Year 3000" having peaked at number three and number two, respectively, Busted became the first act ever to have their first three singles enter the top three in ascending order, a feat that got them into Guinness World Records.

== Music video ==
In the video for the song, Busted try to impress some girls by doing bike stunts at a rally, before being bettered by more experienced riders. Despite this, the video suggests that the singers find someone afterwards: an attractive nurse, played by Lucy Finnigan. When the video first aired on television, the fictitious name shown at the beginning for Bourne's character was 'James Harris'. This was a private joke and was later changed.

== Live performances ==
"You Said No" was promoted by appearances on CD:UK, The Saturday Show, Blue Peter, Top of the Pops and its spin-off show Top of the Pops Saturday, and Re:covered. Busted also performed it live at the Disney Channel Kids Awards, Party in the Park, CBBC Proms in the Park, and Christmas in Popworld.

== Track listings ==
UK CD1

1. "You Said No" (album version)
2. "You Said No" (James' version)
3. "You Said No" (EJDJ mix)
4. "You Said No" (instrumental version)
5. Interview

UK CD2

1. "You Said No" (album version)
2. "You Said No" (Matt's version)
3. "Mrs Robinson"
4. Enhanced section (included video)

UK cassette single

1. "You Said No" (album version)
2. "You Said No" (Charlie's version)
3. "My Good Friend"

== Personnel ==
Personnel are taken from the Busted album booklet.

- Busted – all instruments
  - James Bourne – writing
  - Matt Willis – writing (as Matthew Jay)
  - Charlie Simpson – writing
- Steve Robson – writing, all instruments, production
- John McLaughlin – writing, additional production
- Sidh Solanki – additional programming
- Tom Elmhirst – mixing

== Charts ==
=== Weekly charts ===
Weekly chart performance for "You Said No"
Chart (2003)	Peak position
Austria (Ö3 Austria Top 40)	62
Belgium (Ultratip Bubbling Under Flanders)	1
Denmark (Tracklisten)	15
Europe (Eurochart Hot 100)	4
Germany (GfK)	38
Ireland (IRMA)	3
Netherlands (Dutch Top 40)	40
Netherlands (Single Top 100)	27
Scottish Singles Sales (Official Charts)	2
UK Singles (Official Charts)	1
UK Airplay (Music Week)	14

=== Year-end charts ===
Year-end chart performance for "You Said No"
Chart (2003)	Position
Ireland (IRMA)	49
UK Singles (OCC)	59
