= James Bourne =

English singer-songwriter (born 1983)

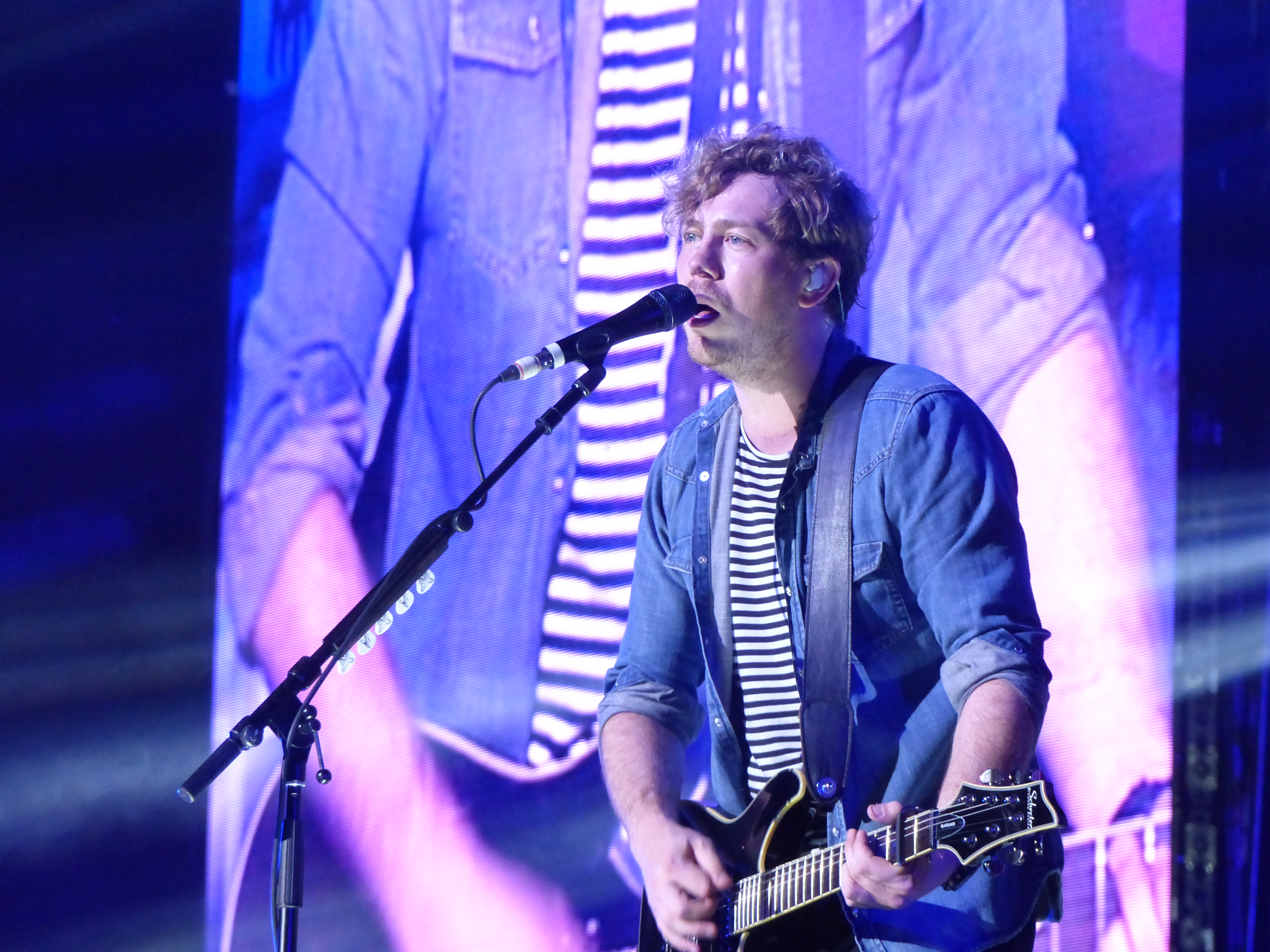
- Bourne performing with Busted at Manchester Arena, 2016

Background information
- Also known as: Future Boy, JB
- Born: James Elliot Bourne; 13 September 1983 (age 43); Rochford, Essex, England
- Genres: Pop rock, pop punk, pop electronic, synth pop
- Occupations: Musician, singer, songwriter, producer
- Instruments: Vocals, guitar, bass, keytar, keyboard, piano
- Years active: 2000–present
- Labels: Mercury, Sic Puppy
- Member of: Busted
- Formerly of: Son of Dork, McBusted
- Website: www.futureboy.com

James Elliot Bourne (born 13 September 1983) is an English singer-songwriter and musician. He is known as the co-founder of pop-punk bands Busted and Son of Dork, and he also created his own electronic project under the alias Future Boy. From 2013 to 2015 he was a member of McBusted, which consisted of himself, Busted bandmate Matt Willis, and McFly.

== Early life ==
Bourne was born in Rochford, Essex to Peter and Maria Bourne and moved to Southend-on-Sea at age ten months. He has a sister named Melissa and two brothers named Nick and Chris.

Bourne attended the independent fee-paying Thorpe Hall School in Southend-on-Sea. Bourne plays electric guitar, piano, and bass guitar. He later attended Morgan Academy of Performing Arts, based in Essex.

== Music career ==
=== Busted ===
At the age of 17, Bourne dropped out of the South East Essex College course in Music Technology to pursue his music career. He met Matt Willis at a gig and they started writing songs together at Bourne's house in Southend. Willis and Bourne placed an ad for a third band member in NME magazine. They held auditions and after listening to a few songs the two had written together, Charlie Simpson joined the band. After signing to Universal in 2002, Busted released their first single, "What I Go to School For", from their self-titled debut album in September that year, which quickly became No. 3 in the UK charts. "Year 3000" soon followed and became a hit as well reaching No. 2 in the charts, their third single "You Said No" was a No. 1 hit.

By the end of the band's career, they had managed eight top 10 singles and four number ones – "You Said No", "Crashed the Wedding", "Who's David" and "Thunderbirds Are Go". Despite their success, Busted split on 14 January 2005 after just three years, following Simpson's decision to leave the band to concentrate on his side project Fightstar.

On 10 November 2015 Busted announced their return as a band, featuring Simpson again. They also announced a 2016 nationwide tour, Pigs Can Fly Tour 2016. Their third album, Night Driver, was released on 25 November 2016. Their fourth studio album titled Half Way There was also released in 2019. At the latter end of that year, Bourne announced a new solo project – officially announcing Busted to be on their first hiatus since the split. In March 2023 they announced a tour to take place in September of the same year, they also re-released some songs from their first two albums, including Loser Kid and Meet You There. In these re-released they collaborated with other bands such as Simple Plan and Neck Deep, the songs were in more of a rock style than their original calmer renditions.

=== Son of Dork ===
After Busted disbanded in January 2005, Bourne formed a new pop rock band named Son of Dork. They released their first single, "Ticket Outta Loserville" in November 2005 followed by their debut album, Welcome to Loserville, two weeks later. Their second single Eddie's Song reached No 10 in the UK charts. They also contributed to the soundtrack of British Comedy film Alien Autopsy.

The band ended in 2007 after Bourne had to dedicate his energy to an ongoing lawsuit for the rights to the Busted songs. He has, however, been open for a reunion though stated he would only bring back the members who wanted to come back. Bourne did reunite with bassist Steven Rushton and guitarist Chris Leonard to perform Man in the Mirror with Welsh Comedy Duo Lilygreen & Maguire.

=== Future Boy ===
Following Son of Dork, Bourne pursued a musical career as a solo artist under the name Future Boy. In June 2009, Bourne announced that he had begun recording his debut solo album; "not a rock album. It is 100% electronic." Volume 1 was produced and mixed by Tommy Henriksen and Bourne at Henriksen's Anarchy Studio's in Nashville and Los Angeles. Side A of Volume 1 was released on 3 May 2010; the album was released via his official website and not a record label. Side B would be released on 3 June. Side B featured a further five songs, including a ballad with his then girlfriend Gabriela Arciero. As part of Valentine's Day, Future Boy posted a new track on Facebook called "Dangerous"; the song didn't make the final cut for Volume 1.

Although Volume 2 was officially announced in February 2011 for a 3 May 2012 release as a Facebook video game Space Travellers, the album has yet to surface due to technical difficulties and other commitments. Bourne confirmed in 2020 that the second album was 'mixed and mastered' but he would not be releasing it due to his commitment to his solo career.

=== Solo projects ===
In 2012, Bourne did his debut solo acoustic tour across the UK. Dates included London, Manchester, Glasgow, Newcastle, Islingon and Birmingham, with Matt Willis and wife, Emma Willis, as well as family members coming to support him. His set consisted of a mixture of songs from Busted, Future Boy and Son of Dork. He went on to do a brief tour in Spain.

On 31 December 2019, Bourne announced a new solo project but reassured Busted fans that the band was not splitting up, tweeting "After twenty amazing years making music, I am stepping into 2020 on a brand new solo adventure. Busted will always be my band. But, I've dreamed for years about releasing my own album so here we go." His first album Safe Journey Home was self released in late 2020 on his own Bad Apple label. Bourne announced a follow-up album, Sugar Beach, on his Twitter for a Summer 2021 release.

=== McBusted ===
In 2013, Bourne supported for McFly, which was later referred to by the newly formed McBusted as the starting point for ideas of McFly and Busted joining as a contribution to the McFly tour, which then later sparked ideas of their own McBusted tour. McBusted released their self-titled debut album on 1 December 2014, with a large portion of the tracks written/co-written by Bourne. Some tracks on the album were from some of Bourne's previous musical projects like "What Happened To Your Band" that was originally written for Son of Dork and "Beautiful Girls Are The Loneliest" which was intended for his solo project. McBusted went on a 21 date tour in 2015 and performed songs from their new album as well as previous McFly and Busted hits.

=== Other projects ===
In early 2013, Bourne formed a band with his brother Chris Bourne called the Bourne Insanity. They independently released their first single "Mohawk" on 16 April, written solely by Chris. In late 2013, Bourne announced via Twitter that he had posted "secret" music under a different name on iTunes. The band was later revealed to be "88", which was Bourne and fellow musician Eric Bazilian. 88 released their first single, "Angels Walk Beside You", on 5 December 2013, and on 8 February 2014 they released their second single "Miss the Girl".

In July 2025, "Cross the Worlds", which was performed by Bourne and is the theme song of the video game Sonic Racing: CrossWorlds, was released.

== Songwriting ==
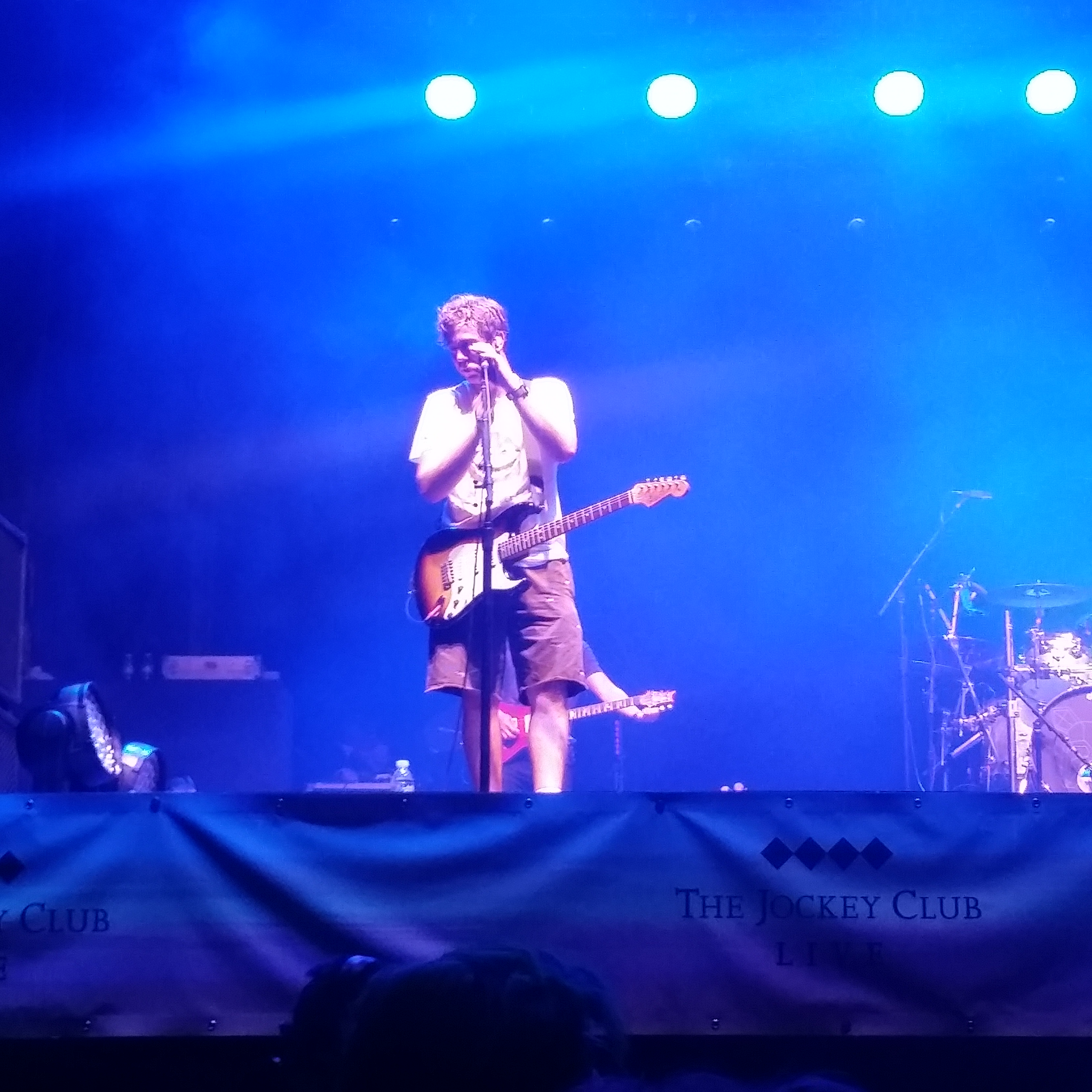
Bourne performing in 2016

Bourne wrote the majority of Busted's two albums with Matt Willis, Charlie Simpson and Tom Fletcher (McFly). Busted's style of music can also be identified in Son of Dork's poppier songs. He explains that his solo writing process is very similar to the creative process of Busted, though things move "20% faster" when he writes on his own.

Bourne has co-writing credits on the first four McFly albums – Room on the 3rd Floor, Wonderland, Motion in the Ocean and Radio:Active, contributing to the majority of the tracks on the former.

He is given writing credits for artists such as Melanie C for whom he wrote "Immune" for her fourth studio album This Time. Other artists Bourne has written for include MC Lars, with whom he wrote the song "Twenty-three" on the This Gigantic Robot Kills album, and Pat Monahan, with whom he co-wrote "Great Escape" on the album Last of Seven. Bourne has recently been writing with his girlfriend's band The Lunabelles and JC Chasez as well as unknown artists as a part of Metrophonic. He has also helped write songs for the British drama Britannia High. He also wrote Eoghan Quigg's debut solo single "28,000 Friends", which was originally performed by Bourne at The Living Room, New York on 11 October 2007. He also co-wrote the Saturdays song, "Forever Is Over", which was released on 2 October and reached number two in the charts. Bourne has also written for Gabriella Cilmi.

In November 2009, Bourne collaborated with Leon G. Thomas III to write the song "Please Don't Change Your Mind".

In 2014, Bourne was writing songs for supergroup McBusted, The Vamps and 5 Seconds of Summer. This includes the song "Daylight" by 5 Seconds of Summer which was cowritten with his brother Chris Bourne. Despite his prolific credits, Bourne says he much prefers writing for himself because he can be "more in tune" with his own songs.

== Musical theatre ==
=== Loserville: The Musical! ===
In February 2009, Youth Music Theatre UK commissioned Bourne, along with his friend Elliot Davis, to write a musical based on the Son of Dork album Welcome to Loserville, Loserville: The Musical. The tickets for the 20 August premiere went up for sale on 7 May. The slogan used for the musical is "I guess it really pays to be a slacker...", and is centred around 17-year-old Michael Dork, who is called a nerd, geek and slacker by others. Bourne tweeted that the musical would be hitting London's West End in 2011; however, it eventually opened on 1 October 2012 at the Garrick Theatre. From 18 June 2012 to 14 July 2012 the musical ran in Leeds at the West Yorkshire Playhouse. The show opened at the Garrick Theatre on 17 October 2012, following previews from 1 October officially beginning its tour on the West End. The production was originally set to run until 2 March 2013, but closed early on 5 January 2013. The production included past Son of Dork band member Danny Hall on drums.

=== Out There: The Musical ===
In 2011, Youth Music Theatre once again commissioned Bourne and Davis to write a new, original musical called Out There. First presented as a workshop presentation in a small theatre west of London, the musical is set in the fictional town of Hope, Texas, and follows the story of Logan Carter, who is on the run from his home town near Detroit after committing a minor felony. Hope is a dead-end, one-horse town (even the horse has died) and its inhabitants are searching for ways to rescue the town from obscurity and financial ruin. Meanwhile, a few miles away in the desert, an old man is building something weird in his outhouse.

In July 2012, the original Youth Music Theatre cast and crew reunited to put on several performances at Riverside Studios in Hammersmith, London, with new songs added. Prior to this, a funding page was set up to allow them to perform and although they didn't reach their $15,000 goal they still went ahead with the shows.

The musical is available to have amateur and professional performances in schools and the stage through the Josef Weinbeger LTD.

=== Murder at the Gates ===
In 2013, Bourne announced another musical he had been working on, Murder at the Gates. This time, the musical sees Bourne working with Spring Awakening writer Steven Sater, who has penned with book & lyrics for this musical whereas Bourne worked solely on the music score. The musical had a trial run performance of three shows in New York under NYU in September 2013 using NYU students. In 2014, the musical was workshopped under Huntington Theatre Company in New York. Murder at the Gates is set in a posh gated community in a manor where a costume birthday party is being held for a murder mystery play.

== Personal life ==
Bourne has a good relationship with the band members of McFly, especially Tom Fletcher, with whom he wrote several songs for both bands.

Bourne owns an American skating and apparel company called SicPuppy, named after a band he was once a member of. Bourne paid over £16,000 for his own record company, SicPuppy Records, which, in 2007, gave unsigned bands a chance to play on the Sic Tour 2007 at Shepherd's Bush Empire. The event was hosted by David Gest and Matt Willis. Musicians who played the event are now pop industry music producers such as Jon Maguire and Phil Gornell.

Bourne dated Instagram and YouTube influencer Emily Canham for five years. Canham announced their split in a video posted on her Emily Canham vlogs YouTube channel on 25 July 2023.

=== Health issues ===
In 2025, Bourne pulled out of the Busted vs McFly tour due to his health. Though he did not specify what his health issues were, he stated that 'there's a lot of information I still don't have about my condition but my bandmates, management and I are unanimous in deciding that I should focus on the medical stuff'. Bandmates Matt Willis and Charlie Simpson stated though they were close to cancelling the tour, Bourne wished it to continue and he was replaced by his younger brother Chris Bourne. In April 2026, Bourne said on his Instagram, "I realised it’s been about six months since I posted last. I have a plan in place to have a major surgery that should extend my life and hopefully make me well enough to come back to what I love the most which is touring and making music. It really sucks to be out of the game. But there is hope!"

On 26 October 2026, Bourne finally revealed what had happened to him. He had been diagnosed with kidney disease and doctors had given him a few years to live, but his brother Chris donated one of his kidneys and it saved James' life.

== Discography ==
Studio albums

As James Bourne

- Safe Journey Home (2020)
- Sugar Beach (2022)

as Future Boy

- Volume 1 (2010)

with Busted

- Busted (2002)
- A Present for Everyone (2003)
- Busted (U.S. version) (2004)
- Night Driver (2016)
- Half Way There (2019)

with Son of Dork

- Welcome to Loserville (2005)

with McBusted

- McBusted (2014)
