= Tom Fletcher =

English musician and singer (born 1985)

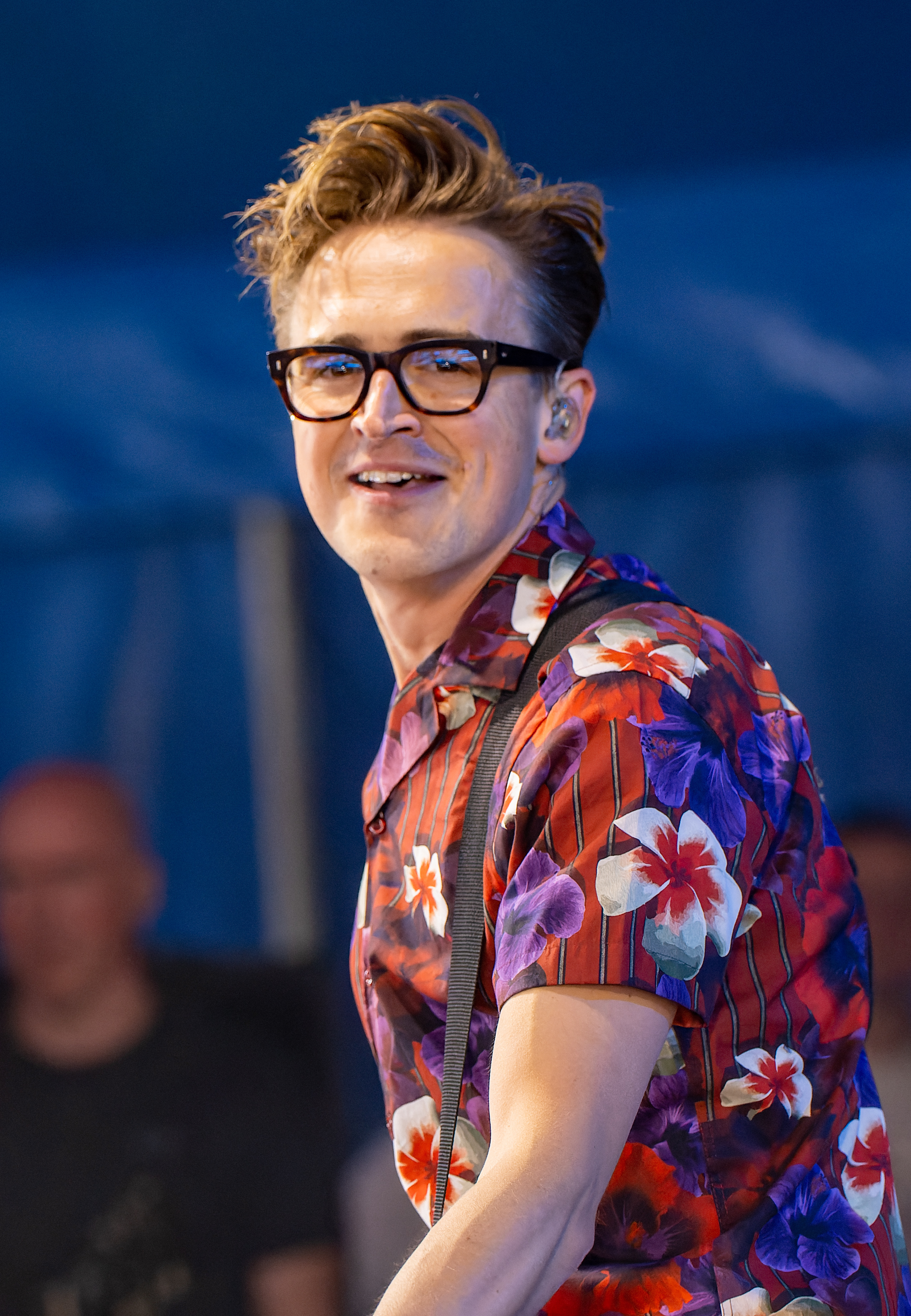
- Fletcher in 2022

Background information
- Born: Thomas Michael Fletcher; 17 July 1985 (age 41); Harrow, London, England
- Genres: Pop rock; pop punk
- Occupations: Author; composer; musician; singer; songwriter; YouTube vlogger
- Instruments: Vocals; guitar; piano; ukulele
- Years active: 2001–present
- Labels: Island; Super; BMG UK
- Member of: McFly
- Formerly of: Busted
- Spouse: Giovanna Falcone (m. 2012)

Thomas Michael Fletcher (born 17 July 1985) is an English musician, composer, author and vlogger. He is one of the lead vocalists and rhythm guitarist of British pop rock band McFly, in addition to being the group's founder.

In his 20-year career as a professional songwriter, Fletcher has written 10 UK number one singles and 21 top-ten singles. He is credited as having written songs for One Direction, Busted, the Vamps and 5 Seconds of Summer.

== Early life ==
Fletcher was born on 17 July 1985, in Harrow, London. He attended the Sylvia Young Theatre School in London, where, at the age of 13, he met Giovanna Falcone, whom he would later marry in 2012. He has a younger sister, Carrie Hope Fletcher, who is a musical theatre actress. When he was 10 years old, Fletcher starred as the main role in Oliver! at the London Palladium alongside Jim Dale as Fagin. He then went on to do a documentary about HIV for schools and starred in a commercial. In 1995, Fletcher made a small appearance in the video for the Mike + The Mechanics single "Over My Shoulder". When Fletcher was a schoolchild, he was schoolmates with Busted bassist Matt Willis. In 1997, he starred as Louis in the BBC Radio 4 drama, A Christmas Card.

== Musical career ==
At a very young age, Fletcher began writing music commercially. He originally auditioned for band Busted, but lost out on the place to Charlie Simpson after the record label Island Records decided the band should be a trio rather than a four-piece; Fletcher states that he was in the band "for about 24 hours." This led to a job with the band's songwriting team, mainly because of the label's intrigue with his writing talents, Fletcher then got to know Busted band member James Bourne, which would then lead to a strong songwriting relationship between the two. He has since stated that it was Bourne who taught him "how to structure a pop hit".

=== McFly ===
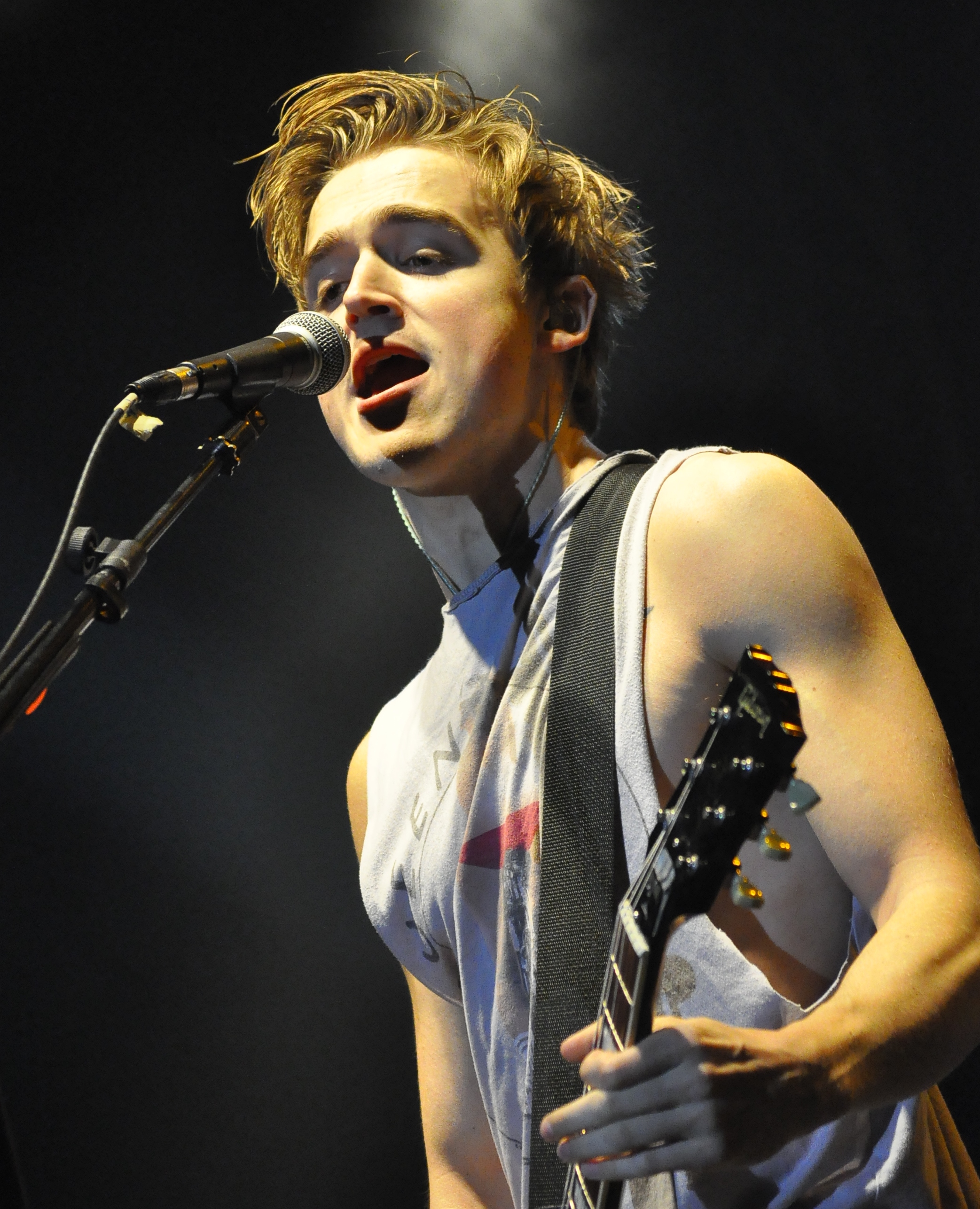
Fletcher performing in 2011

During the writing project for Busted's second album A Present for Everyone, Fletcher was asked by the record label if he was available to film auditions for a new band, V. It was at this time that he and Danny Jones met for the first time; Jones went to the audition mistaking the band to be a Busted-esque band, rather than the conventional, all-singing, all-dancing, boy band for which they were intended. Impressed with Jones's style, Fletcher invited him to write with him and Bourne. When writing projects for Busted had come to an end, the two began collaborating for their own (as yet unnamed) band, and, eventually, moved into the InterContinental Hotel in London for two months to concentrate on writing together. During this time together Fletcher and Jones wrote most of their first album, Room on the 3rd Floor. Bassist Dougie Poynter and drummer Harry Judd were subsequently recruited via a classified advertisement. Fletcher came up with the idea to name the band after Marty McFly, the main character from his favorite film Back to the Future. McFly then rose to fame after Busted helped launch them by inviting them to be the opening act on their tour in March 2004.

In 2004, McFly made it into the Guinness Book of World Records, beating the Beatles's record for "the youngest band to have a debut album go straight to number one". Fletcher has written the majority of McFly's songs with Jones and Poynter, with occasional contributions by Judd; Bourne has also assisted with songwriting on occasions. As of 15 November 2010, McFly have released five studio albums and two compilation albums. A greatest hits album entitled Memory Lane: The Best of McFly which includes a number of B-sides from earlier albums, original demos of well known tracks as well as three new singles, was released in November 2012. As well as being the founding member of McFly, Fletcher plays rhythm guitar, shares lead vocals with Danny Jones, and sometimes undertakes the role of ukulele player and pianist.

=== Songwriting ===
Fletcher has written or co-written 10 UK number-one singles: "Crashed the Wedding", "Who's David?", and "Thunderbirds" for Busted; and "Five Colours in Her Hair", "Obviously", "All About You," "I'll Be OK", "Please, Please", "Star Girl", and "Transylvania" for McFly. He co-wrote eight of the songs on A Present for Everyone, as well as all but one ("Not Alone", written by Jones) of the tracks on McFly's debut album, Room on the 3rd Floor. He is the primary writer on the majority of tracks on all seven of the band's albums. Of McFly's four members, he has "the most songwriting credits and therefore the most money".

Fletcher wrote "On a Rainbow", the official song of the 2012 Summer Olympics' mascots Wenlock and Mandeville. The song features vocals from him and his sister Carrie Hope Fletcher. He also wrote the song "I Want" for One Direction's debut album Up All Night, and co-wrote (with Dougie Poynter and Danny Jones) "I Would" for their second album Take Me Home and "Don't Forget Where You Belong" for their third album Midnight Memories. He has co-written several songs with James Bourne including "Chills in the Evening", recorded by V. He also co-wrote "High Hopes" along with all four members of the Vamps for their debut album, Meet the Vamps. Fletcher is also credited as having co-written the 5 Seconds of Summer track "Try Hard". The song was originally released on YouTube on 1 June 2013, and in 2014 featured as a B-Side to their hit single "Don't Stop". He also cowrote the song "Own This Town" with the British band Chapter 13 for their Britain's Got Talent semi-final performance.

== Children's books ==
Fletcher released his first children's book in 2012. Co-written with band-mate Dougie Poynter, The Dinosaur that Pooped Christmas sold more than 72,000 copies and became the most popular debut children's book of 2012. A follow-up titled The Dinosaur that Pooped a Planet was released on 29 August 2013.

Fletcher released his first solo novel, The Christmasaurus, on 6 October 2016, about a young boy called William Trundle who goes on a magical adventure on Christmas Eve. On 6 October 2017, a musical version of the book, entitled The Christmasaurus: Musical Edition, was released. On 21 March 2019, Fletcher released his second novel and released a Lead single from the soundtrack to THE CREAKERS: THE MUSICAL EDITION called "Don't Turn Out The Light" (featuring Chapter 13) from Britain's Got Talent, along with a music video.

Fletcher released The Christmasaurus and the Winter Witch in October 2019, a sequel to his first solo novel The Christmasaurus. In November 2020, a series of Fletcher's books appeared in McDonald's Happy Meals as activity packs, including stickers. In 2020, he also released 'The Danger Gang' a debut novel bestseller, also releasing an audiobook read by Harry Potter star, Tom Felton. The book is about a boy named Franky who moves house.

== Other work ==
In 2008, Fletcher contributed to the short story anthology Wow! 366. Fletcher and the other members of McFly released their memoir Unsaid Things... Our Story in the autumn of 2012.

In June 2011, Fletcher appeared on the ITV game show The Cube and became the third person to win £100,000. He gave the money to Comic Relief and BIRT. Later that year, he appeared as a gorilla for bandmate Dougie Poynter to ask five questions for the celebrity chest on episode 11 of I'm a Celebrity... Get Me Out of Here!. He was also there to greet Poynter on the red carpet after he had won the series. In 2013, he took part in All Star Family Fortunes and All Star Mr and Mrs. All four members of McFly played Celebrity Deal or No Deal for charity in 2012 as well. In November 2013, he appeared on Never Mind the Buzzcocks with Emma Willis. Fletcher has been a guest on Celebrity Juice three times. In 2016, he was a judge on ITV's Lorraine's competition to find a new children's author.

Fletcher has a strong YouTube audience with slightly more than 633,000 subscribers. He was a frequent vlogger, filming his daily life and his life while he was on tour with McFly. He stopped regularly vlogging after the birth of his third child Max.

In April 2021, Fletcher announced on his Instagram that he was asked to write an original song for Shanghai Disney Resort's 5th anniversary nighttime spectacular, "ILLUMINATE." His song is titled "Light Is In You" and forms the soundtrack of the fireworks show that concludes almost every day at the park.

Between September and November 2021 Fletcher was a contestant on the nineteenth series of Strictly Come Dancing partnered with professional dancer Amy Dowden. On 21 November they were the eighth couple to be eliminated from the contest, after a dance-off against Rhys Stephenson and Nancy Xu. From 2024 until 2026, Fletcher has been featured as a coach on The Voice UK alongside Danny Jones in a duo chair serving during series 13 and 14.

On 12 December 2023, it was announced that Fletcher would write the music and lyrics for Paddington: The Musical based on the Paddington Bear stories by Michael Bond and the film series. The musical opened on 1 November 2025 and is currently running at the Savoy Theatre. The musical is set to debut on Broadway in spring 2027 at the Al Hirschfeld Theatre.

== Personal life ==
On 18 April 2011, Fletcher became engaged to his schoolmate and longtime girlfriend Giovanna Falcone. They were married on 12 May 2012. In January 2013, Fletcher uploaded a video to YouTube, titled My Wedding Speech, in which he sang to the tunes of several of McFly's most successful songs during his speech: the video has received more than 24 million views.

Giovanna is also a YouTube vlogger and an author. Her books, Billy and Me, You're the One That I Want, Christmas with Billy and Me, Dream a Little Dream, and Dream a Little Christmas Dream are published by Penguin's Michael Joseph. She also released a book in 2017 about motherhood titled, Happy Mum, Happy Baby. She also blogs weekly for Hello! magazine.

It was announced on Fletcher's YouTube channel on 29 October 2013 that the couple were expecting their first child, with a video titled, We Have Some News.... In March 2014 their son was born. Fletcher announced on 3 September 2015, again on YouTube, that his wife Giovanna was expecting their second child, by means of a video entitled 'Player 2'. In February 2016 their second son was born. During both pregnancies, Fletcher and his wife Giovanna took pictures every day throughout the nine months of pregnancy. They created another YouTube video to announce the arrival of their first son, which has more than 16 million views. On 3 March 2018 it was announced that their third child was due in September, but their third son was born in August 2018.

Fletcher's younger sister is Carrie Hope Fletcher, an actress, author, singer and YouTube vlogger. Carrie joined him to produce the 2012 Olympic Mascot song, "On a Rainbow". Carrie also joined as a part of the cast of The Christmasaurus Live, a live production of Tom's debut children's novel of the same name. She played the part of Brenda Payne and sang two solo songs, "Thin Ice" and "I've Been a Good Girl".

In McFly's autobiography Unsaid Things, Fletcher discussed his diagnosis of bipolar disorder, which he has stated was a great influence over McFly's second album, Wonderland. He has also described his struggles with his eating disorder, weight, and obsessive dieting.

In June 2021, Fletcher and his wife apologised for using the government scheme to furlough an employee. Fletcher and his wife Giovanna released a statement on social media clarifying that the money had been returned and admitted that "it was a huge error of judgement."

== Discography ==
=== Solo singles ===
Year	Title	Album
2017	"Afraid of Heights"	The Christmasaurus: The Musical Edition
2017	"Don't Know What It Is"	The Christmasaurus: The Musical Edition
2019	"Don't Turn Out The Light" (featuring 13)	The Creakers: The Musical Edition
2025	"The Explorer & The Bear"	Paddington: The Musical
2025	"Pretty Little Dead Things"	Paddington: The Musical

=== Music videos ===
Year	Song	Director
2017	"Afraid of Heights"	David Spearing
2017	"Don't Know What It Is"	David Spearing
2019	"Don't Turn Out The Light"	David Spearing
2025	"The Explorer & The Bear"	Amy Coop

== Bibliography ==
- Two short stories in WOW! 366 (2008, Scholastic)
- The Christmasaurus (2016, Puffin)
- There's a Monster in your Book (2017, Puffin)
- The Creakers (2017, Puffin)
- The Christmasaurus: The Musical Edition (2017, Puffin)
- Brain Freeze (2018, Puffin)
- There's a Dragon in your Book (2018, Puffin)
- The Creakers: The Musical Edition (2019, Puffin)
- There's an Alien in your Book (2019, Puffin)
- The Christmasaurus and the Winter Witch (2019, Puffin)
- There's an Elf in your Book (2019, Puffin)
- There's a Superhero in your Book (2020, Puffin)
- There's a Witch in your Book (2020, Puffin)
- The Danger Gang (2020, Puffin)
- There's a Wolf in your Book (2021, Puffin)
- Who's in your Audiobook? (2021, Puffin)
- There's a Unicorn in your Book (2021, Puffin)
- The Christmasaurus Picture Book (2021, Puffin)
- The Christmasaurus and the Naughty List (2021, Puffin)
- There's a Bear in your Book (2022, Puffin)
- Space Band (2022, Puffin)
- The Christmasaurus Cracker (2022, Puffin)
- There's a Dinosaur in your Book (2023, Puffin)
- A Christmasaurus Carol (2023, Puffin)
- There's a Little Chick in your Book (2024, Puffin)
- The Christmasaurus and the Night Before Christmas (2024, Puffin)
- There's a Little Snowman in your Book (2024, Puffin)
- There's a Bunny in your Book (2025, Puffin)
- There's a Little Puppy in your Book (2025, Puffin)
- There's a Little Ghost in your Book (2025, Puffin)
- Pudsey and the Thread of Hope (2025, Penguin)
- There's a Little Kitten in your Book (February 2026, Puffin)

=== With McFly ===
- Unsaid Things...Our Story (2012, Bantam Press)

=== With Dougie Poynter ===
- The Dinosaur that Pooped Christmas (2012, Puffin)
- The Dinosaur that Pooped a Planet (2013, Puffin)
- The Dinosaur that Pooped the Past (2014, Puffin)
- The Dinosaur that Pooped a Lot (2015, Puffin)
- The Dinosaur that Pooped the Bed (2015, Puffin)
- The Dinosaur that Pooped Daddy (2016, Puffin)
- The Dinosaur that Pooped a Rainbow (2016, Puffin)
- The Dinosaur that Pooped a Princess (2018, Puffin)
- The Dinosaur that Pooped a Pirate (2020, Puffin)
- The Dinosaur that Pooped Halloween (2022, Puffin)
- The Dinosaur that Pooped Easter (2023, Puffin)
- The Dinosaur that Pooped a Reindeer (2023, Puffin)
- The Dinosaur that Pooped a Superhero (2024, Puffin)
- The Dinosaur that Pooped a Zoo (2025, Puffin)
- The Dinosaur that Pooped a Monster (2025, Puffin)

=== With Giovanna Fletcher ===
- Eve of Man: Eve of Man Book 1 (2018, Michael Joseph)
- The Eve Illusion: Eve of Man Book 2 (2020, Michael Joseph)
- Eve of Man: Book 3 (February 2026, Michael Joseph)
