= What I Go to School For =

2002 single by Busted

- CD1 cover

Single by Busted

from the album Busted
- B-side: "Brown Eyed Girl"; "Dawson's Geek"
- Released: 16 September 2002
- Length: 3:30
- Label: Universal; Island
- Songwriters: James Bourne; Matt Willis; Charlie Simpson; Steve Robson; John McLaughlin
- Producer: Steve Robson

Busted singles chronology
"What I Go to School For" (2002)	"Year 3000" (2003)

"What I Go to School For"
- CD2 cover

Music video
- "What I Go to School For" on YouTube

"What I Go to School For" is a song by English pop rock band Busted. It was written by James Bourne, Charlie Simpson, Matt Willis, Steve Robson, and John McLaughlin and produced by Robson. The track was inspired by a teacher that Willis had a crush on at school. Released on 16 September 2002 as Busted's debut single, the song reached number three on the UK Singles Chart. A young Jade Ewen (who would later join girl group Sugababes) appears in the music video.

== Background ==
Matt Willis told the Essex Chronicle that the song came about after a night out in TOTs 2000 (now known as Talk nightclub) in James Bourne's hometown of Southend-on-Sea. "We were too young, we got drunk and went to TOTs," Willis said. "Then we walked home and continued drinking on the way – it took us ages. When we got back to James' house, we went to his bedroom and just picked up the guitar and that's when we started writing What I Go to School For." In 2003, the real-life inspiration for the song was revealed to be Willis' former teacher Michelle Blair, who made a surprise appearance on The Frank Skinner Show on ITV during an interview with Willis. Blair, who was 28 and had been married for three years at the time of her appearance on The Frank Skinner Show, was Willis' dance teacher at the Sylvia Young Theatre School when Willis was 15. Speaking about the surprise appearance with Willis on the show, Blair said: "It was hilarious – he looked like he wanted the ground to swallow him up. I only found out the song was about me after it came out – it's really flattering." Blair said that at the time she was not aware of her pupil's crush on her, but that she did remember him from the dance classes: "He was quite cheeky and charming and always had something to say in class. He used to tell us he was in a band, but I never dreamed they were going to be this big and I certainly hadn't a clue I was going to feature in one of their songs!"

Commenting on the veracity of these events as portrayed in the song, Blair said: "I think he's used a bit of artistic licence in the song. It was a dance class so we never used any pencils but I suppose he had ample opportunity to look at my bum. There was never any tree outside my bedroom window though – I think I might have noticed a Peeping Tom." Reflecting on his time under the tutelage of Miss Blair, Willis said, "She was kind of nice and there was always something really sexy about her." Being identified as the object of adolescent lust, and the subject of a pop song, hasn't caused any friction with her husband, according to Blair: "My husband thinks its (sic) hilarious and takes the mickey. I don't think he's really worried I'm going to run off with a pop star. I'm proud of them. Looking back it was obvious Matt had what it takes."

On 29 October 2012, Michelle Blair appeared as the correct answer in the "line-up" section of BBC Two panel Never Mind the Buzzcocks.

== Musical ==
What I Go to School For became the title of a musical theatre production produced by Youth Music Theatre UK following the story of Busted from their origins in Southend-on-Sea, Essex, through to their break-up in 2005. The musical was written by Elliot Davis with songs from Busted’s albums and new music by Bourne. It was directed by Steven Dexter and played at the Theatre Royal, Brighton in August 2016.

== Music video ==
The video for the song features model Lorna Roberts as Miss McKenzie, the object of the band's desire. Then 14-year-old Jade Ewen, who later joined the Sugababes, appears in the video as a schoolgirl. The filming of the "What I Go to School For" video was later parodied in the video for the 2019 Busted song "Nineties".

== Track listings ==
UK CD1 and Australian CD single

1. "What I Go to School For" (single version) – 3:30
2. "What I Go to School For" (acoustic version) – 3:26
3. "What I Go to School For" (alternative version) – 3:31
4. "What I Go to School For" (instrumental mix) – 3:28
5. "What I Go to School For" (CD-ROM video)

UK CD2

1. "What I Go to School For" (single version)
2. "Brown Eyed Girl"
3. Interactive interview (CD-ROM video)

UK cassette single

1. "What I Go to School For"
2. "Dawson's Geek"
3. "What I Go to School For" (acoustic version)

US CD single

1. "What I Go to School For" (radio version)
2. "What I Go to School For" (album version)
3. "What I Go to School For" (CD-ROM video)

Japanese CD single

1. "What I Go to School For"
2. "Brown Eyed Girl"
3. "What I Go to School For" (instrumental mix)

== Personnel ==
Personnel are taken from the Busted album booklet.

- Busted – all instruments
  - James Bourne – writing
  - Matt Willis – writing (as Matthew Jay)
  - Charlie Simpson – writing
- Steve Robson – writing, all instruments, production
- John McLaughlin – writing, additional production
- Sidh Solanki – additional programming
- Tom Elmhirst – mixing

== Charts ==
=== Weekly charts ===
Weekly chart performance for "What I Go to School For"
Chart (2002–2003)	Peak position
Australia (ARIA)	22
Austria (Ö3 Austria Top 40)	32
Europe (Eurochart Hot 100)	15
Germany (GfK)	34
Ireland (IRMA)	20
Latvia (Latvijas Top 40)	24
Romania (Romanian Top 100)	75
Scottish Singles Sales (Official Charts)	3
Switzerland (Schweizer Hitparade)	33
UK Singles (Official Charts)	3
UK Airplay (Music Week)	28

=== Year-end charts ===
Year-end chart performance for "What I Go to School For"
Chart (2002)	Position
UK Singles (OCC)	84

== Certifications ==
Certifications for "What I Go to School For"
Region	Certification	Certified units/sales
United Kingdom (BPI)	Platinum	600,000^{‡}
^{‡} Sales+streaming figures based on certification alone.

== Release history ==
Release dates and formats for "What I Go to School For"
Region	Date	Format(s)	Label(s)	Ref(s).
United Kingdom	16 September 2002	CD; cassette	Universal; Island	
Australia	13 January 2003	CD	Universal; Island	
Japan	21 June 2003	CD	Universal Music Japan	
United States	23 August 2004	Contemporary hit radio	Universal	

== Cover versions ==
- "What I Go to School For" was parodied by the Amateur Transplants on their 2004 album Fitness to Practice.
- The Jonas Brothers covered the song for their 2006 album It's About Time, with the subject of the narrator's desire being changed from a teacher to an older student.
