= British Youth Music Theatre =

British national performing arts organisation

BRITISH YOUTH MUSIC THEATRE
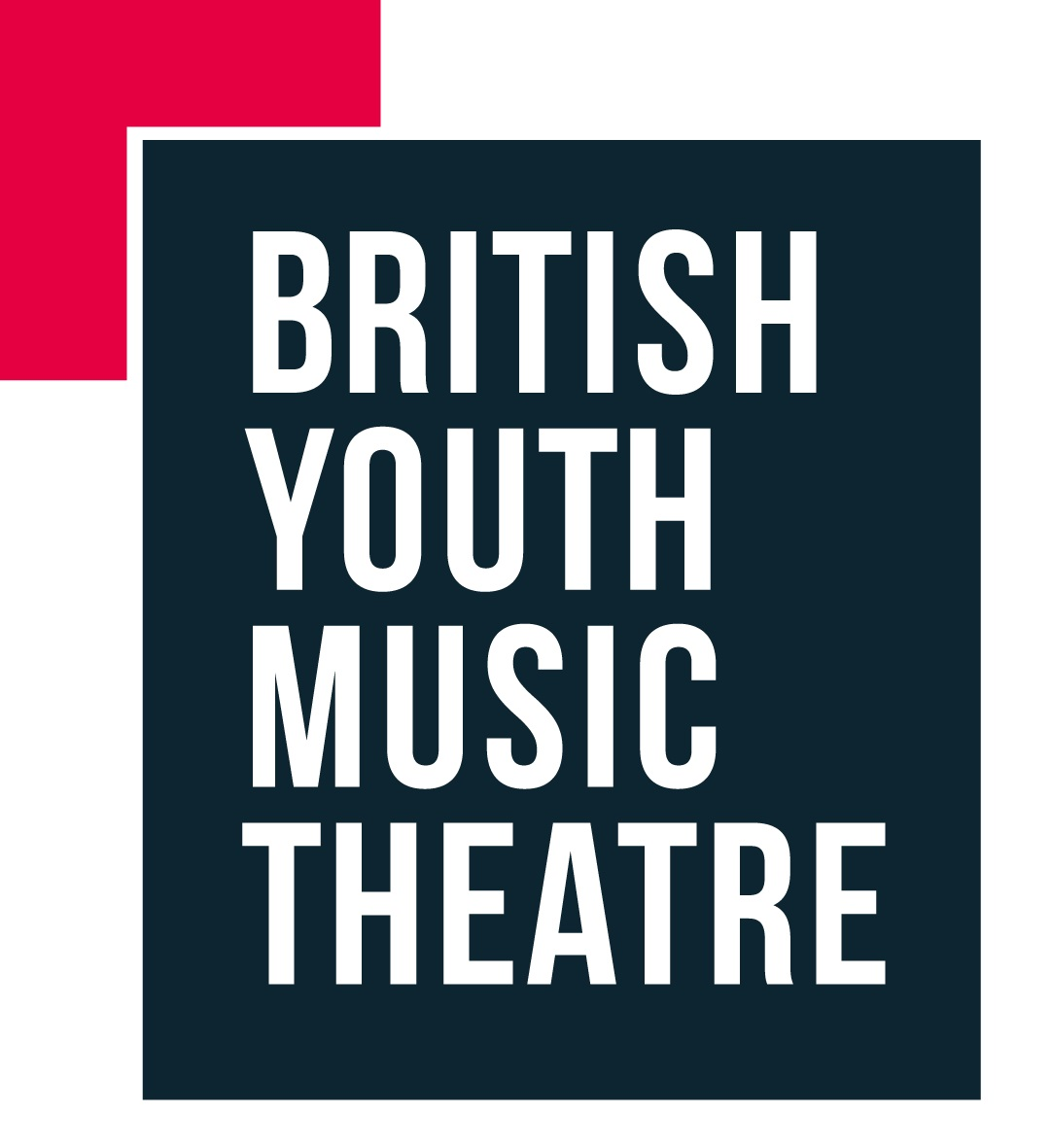
- Address: Mountview, 120 Peckham Hill Street, Peckham; London SE15 5JT; United Kingdom
- Public transit: Peckham Rye

Construction
- Opened: 2003; 23 years ago

Website
- britishyouthmusictheatre.org

British Youth Music Theatre (BYMT), formerly Youth Music Theatre UK, is a UK-based national performing arts organisation founded in December 2003. BYMT provides music theatre training to young people aged 11–21 and a stepping stone to drama school or conservatoire. Members can join either through auditions in January and February onto productions or, without audition, onto summer camps. Most of its productions and summer camps are residential and situated around the UK with productions taking place in both regional and London theatres.

The company traded as Youth Music Theatre UK from its incorporation in 2003 until its 15th birthday on 4 December 2018 when it formally changed its legal name to British Youth Music Theatre. This coincided with moving its London office to the new Mountview building in Peckham, south east London. It is one of Arts Council England's National Portfolio Organisations and one of seven National Youth Music Organisations. It receives funding from both the Department for Education and Arts Council England. It is also sponsored by the teachers union, the NASUWT.

The BYMT training programme focuses almost entirely on new music theatre and by 2019 had produced 127 productions of 101 new works including, in 2009, Loserville which went on to become a professional West End production at the Garrick Theatre in 2012. A number of these productions including Loserville are available for licence either through Music Theatre International in London or directly from the writers.

The company's founder and Executive Producer Jon Bromwich retired in April 2022 and his successor Emily Gray became CEO and Creative Director after leaving her post as Director of Mercury Musical Developments.

== Alumni ==
Alumni include Ed Sheeran, Sam Smith, Charlotte Ritchie and Daisy Chute (the last two were in All Angels cross-over singing group as well as being actresses), Tara Wilcox of The Wandering Hearts, Baker Mukasa and Kayleigh McKnight (both in Tina: The Musical), Gabriel Mokake and Christopher Tendai (both in Hamilton), Grace Mouat and Tim Mahendran (both in & Juliet).

== New Musical Theatre Award ==
The New Musical Theatre Award is an annual prize established by British Youth Music Theatre to support emerging writers, lyricists, composers, musical producers and creators based in the United Kingdom or Ireland. The prize provides the winning writer or writing team with the opportunity to develop a new musical for full production with BYMT's young company.

Year	Musical	Creator(s)	Original production
2025	Sea Change	Will Jackson (book writer and co-lyricist) and Elinor Peregrin (composer and co-lyricist)	Birmingham Hippodrome, 2026
2024	The Glamification of Loki	Eden Tredwell (writer, lyricist and composer)	Southwark Playhouse Elephant, London, 2025
2023	Welcome to Serene	Iona Ramsay (writer) and Bethany Tennick (composer)	New Wolsey Theatre, Ipswich, 2024
2022	Harry & Greta	Lewis Cornay (writer, lyricist and composer)	New Wolsey Theatre, Ipswich, 2023
2021	Babies	Martha Geelan (book writer) and Jack Godfrey (composer and lyricist)	New Wolsey Theatre, Ipswich, 2021
2019	The Dickens Girls	Rachel Bellman (book and lyrics) and Elizabeth Charlesworth (music)	New Wolsey Theatre, Ipswich, 2019

== Principal productions ==
=== 2020 ===
There were no productions in 2020 due to the Covid-19 pandemic.

=== 2019 ===
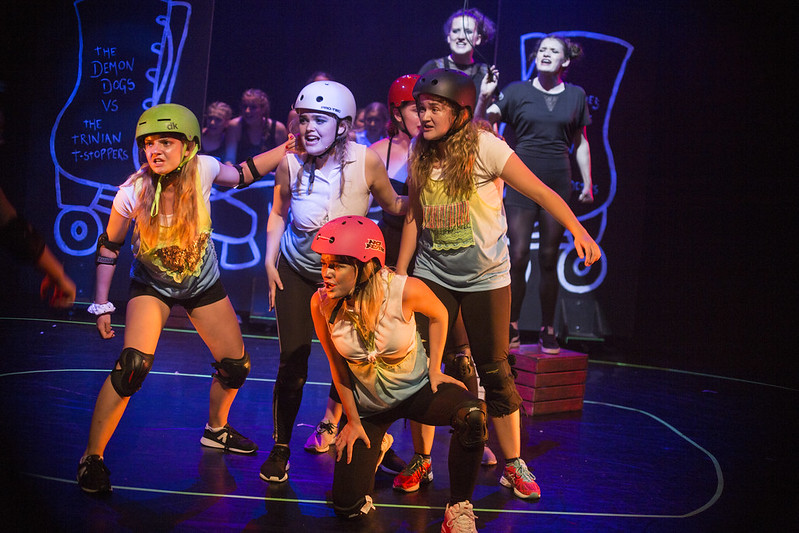
Hot Wheels – Barbican Theatre, Plymouth

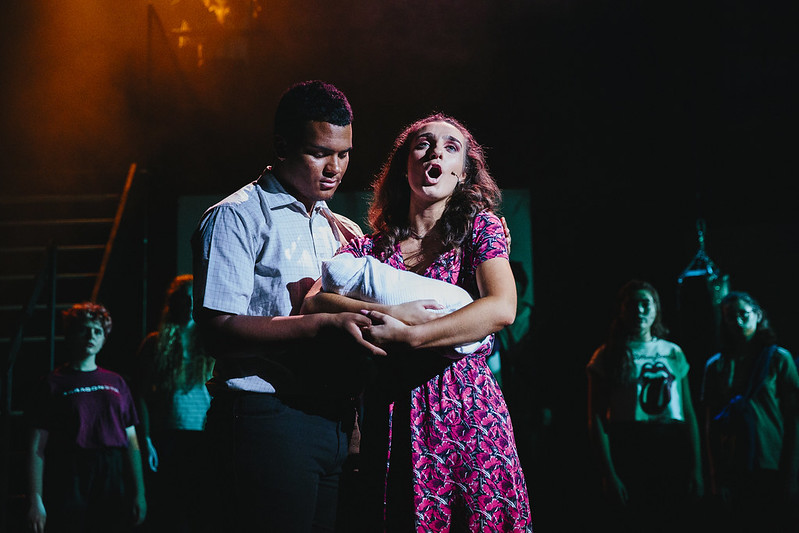
Fight Like A Girl – Mountview Theatre, London

- Paperboy adapted from the 2011 memoir of growing up on Belfast's Shankill Road in the 1970s by Tony Macaulay, music by Duke Special, book and lyrics by Andrew Doyle, directed by Steven Dexter and Dean Johnson, choreography by Julia Cave, designed by Natalia Alvarez, lighting by Alan Valentine, musical direction by Matthew Reeve, sound by Ian Vennard. Lyric Theatre, Belfast.
- The Dickens Girls, winner of the 2019 New Music Theatre Award, based on the true stories of Angela Burdett-Coutts home for fallen girls in West London, music by Elizabeth Sybil Charlesworth, book and lyrics by Rachel Bellman, directed by Charlie Westenra, choreography by Steve Harris, designed by Stuart Charlesworth, lighting by David Phillips, musical direction by Oliver Jackson, sound by James Cook. New Wolsey Theatre, Ipswich.
- The Accidental Time Traveller, adapted from the children's novel by Scottish writer Janis MacKay, music by David Hewson, book and lyrics by Clare Prenton, directed by Clare Prenton, choreography by Chris Whittaker, designed by Caitlinn Mawhinney, lighting by Nathan Benjamin, musical direction by Elfyn Jones. Barbican Theatre, Plymouth.
- Extinction, Dance Connection 5, inspired by Extinction Rebellion's campaigns to halt climate change, music by Nicola Chang, concept, choreography and direction by Rachel Birch-Lawson, designed by Sophie Barlow, lighting by Gareth Evans. Rhoda McGaw Theatre, Woking.
- Peter Pan, adapted from the novel by J. M. Barrie, music by Jimmy Jewell, book and lyrics by Nick Stimson, directed by Sara Ingram, choreography by Mark Iles, designed by Sarah Oxley, lighting by Jack Weir, musical direction by Cillian Donaghy, sound by Andy Onion. Theatre Royal, Margate.
- Hot Wheels, a part devised work on the sport of women's roller derby, music by Ella Grace, written, devised and directed by Ellie Jones, movement direction by Steve Kirkham, designed by, lighting by Nathan Jones. Barbican Theatre, Plymouth.
- A.L.I.C.E. in Wanderlust, a devised work about an Artificial Intelligence being, music by Adam Gerber, devised and directed by Ellis Kerkhoven, choreography by Alicia Frost, scenery and lighting designed by Andrew Exeter, sound by Andy Onion. Lawrence Batley Theatre, Huddersfield.
- Fight Like A Girl, a musical about women's boxing, music by James Atherton, book, lyrics and direction by Nick Stimson, designed by Talia Sanz, movement direction by Kevin Johnson, boxing coach Iain Perriss, lighting by Joe Thomas, sound by Aiden Conor. Mountview Theatre, Peckham, London.

=== 2018 ===
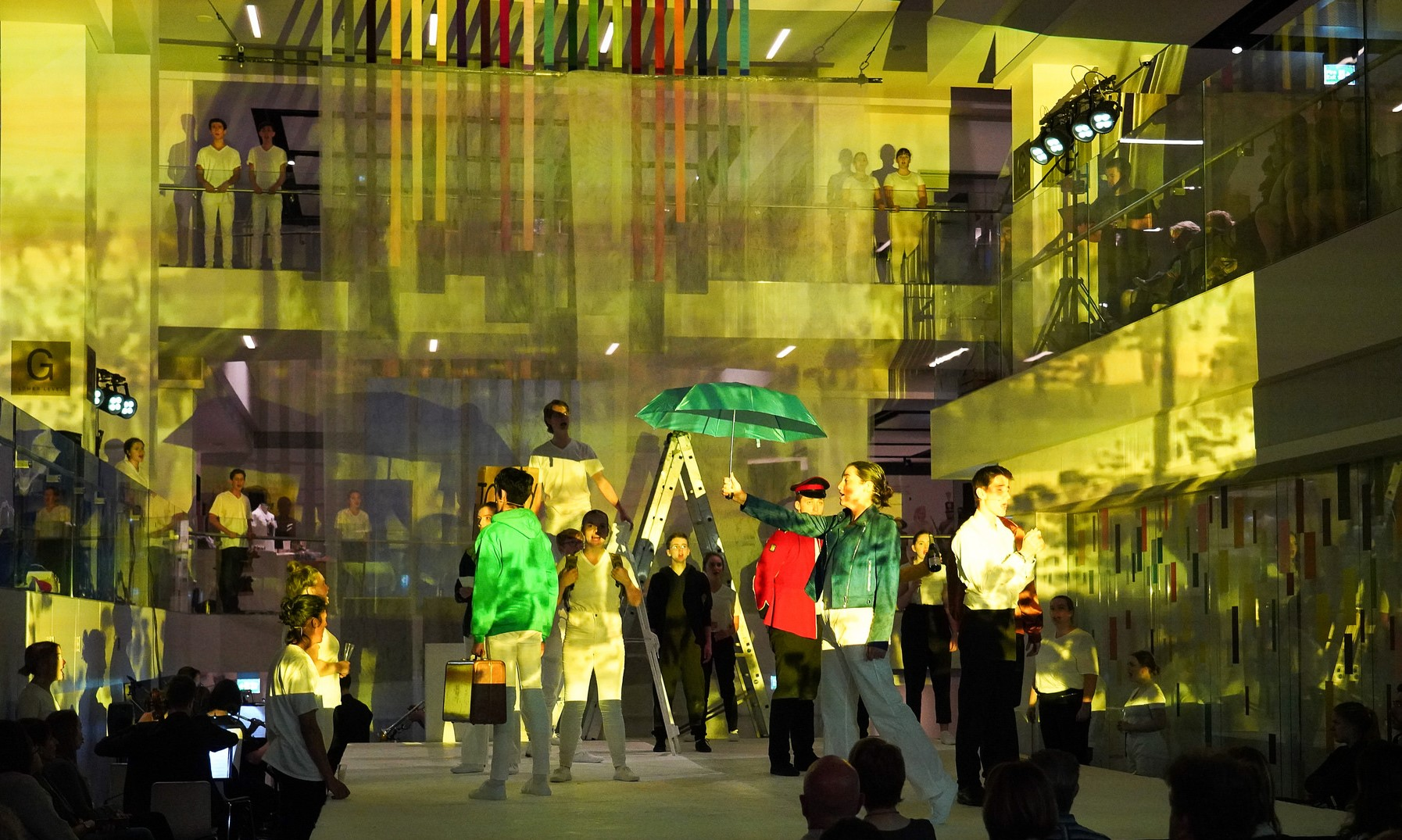
Barrack Room Ballads – National Army Museum, London

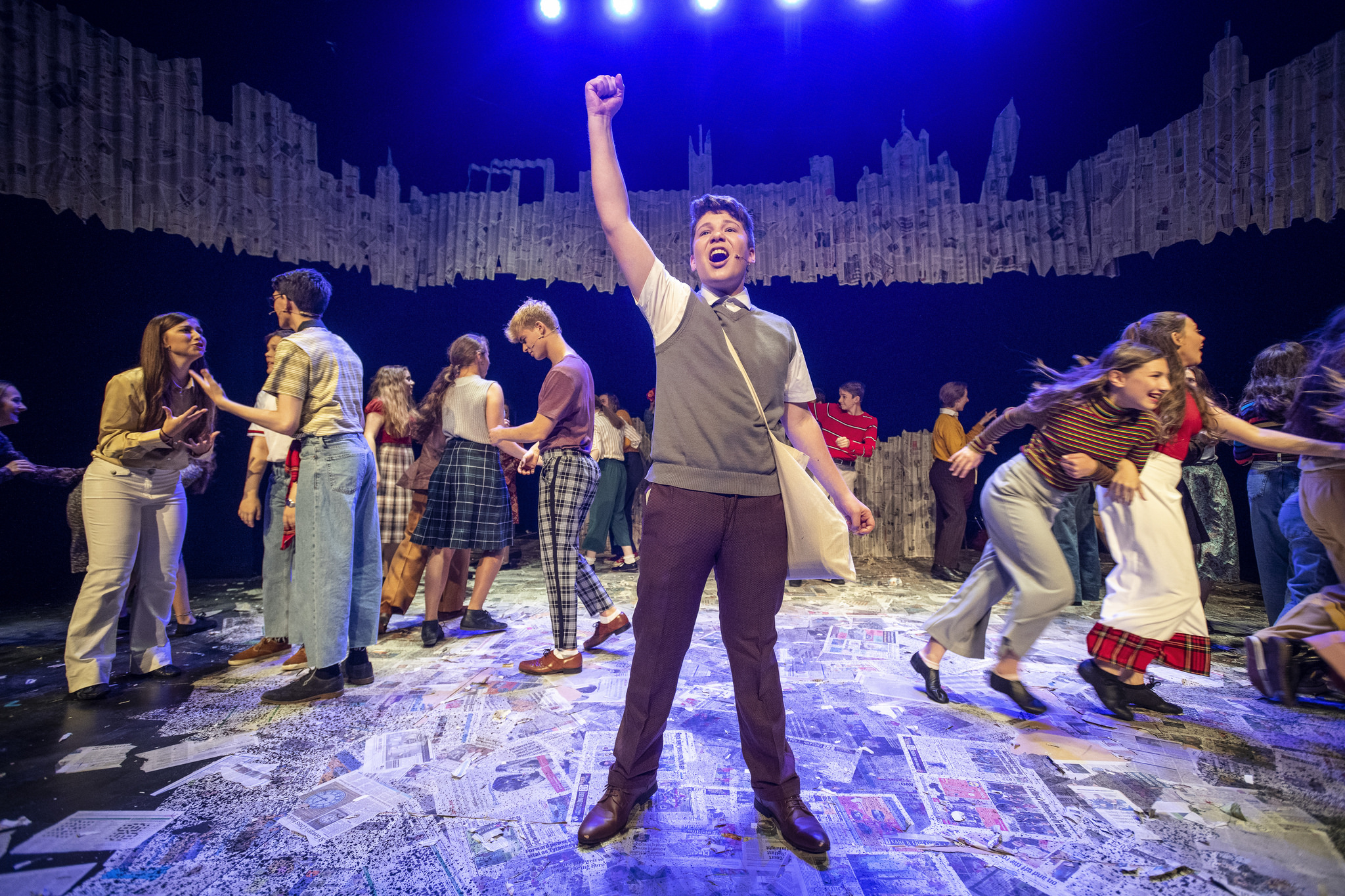
Paperboy – Lyric Theatre Belfast

- A Winter's Tale, adapted from Shakespeare's The Winter's Tale, set in an unnamed totalitarian country in the early 1950s and a Mediterranean island during the Summer of Love in 1967, music and lyrics by Howard Goodall, book by Nick Stimson, directed by Bronagh Lagan, choreography by Phyllida Crowley-Smith, designed by Libby Todd, lighting by Alan Valentine, musical direction by Greg Arrowsmith. Rose Theatre, Kingston.
- Barrack Room Ballads, adapted from the poems by Rudyard Kipling, book music lyrics and direction by Conor Mitchell, choreography by Richard Chapell, designed by Els Borghart and Declan Kelly for Nexus Arts, musical director Alex Bellamy. National Army Museum, London.
- WILD, an all-female devised musical about finding the wild within you, music by Charlotte Harding, devised and directed by Lewis Barfoot, choreography by Katy Ayling, designed by Amelia Johnson. Barbican Theatre, Plymouth.
- No Man's Land, Dance Connection 4, an all-female production, based on the true story of escape from a totalitarian society to a consumer society, music by Nicola Chang, concept, choreography and direction by Rachel Birch-Lawson, designed by Sophie Barlow. Square Chapel, Halifax.
- Help! Get Me Out of This Musical, developed from the 2009 devised production ‘’’Force 9½’’’, music by Alexander Rudd, book and lyrics by John Nicholson, directed by Luke Sheppard, choreography by Julia Cave, designed by Sarah Oxley, musical direction by Adam Gerber. South Hill Park Arts Centre, Bracknell.
- Cautionary Tales, a modern musical inspired by the work of Hilaire Belloc, music and lyrics by Rebecca Applin, devised and directed by Rebecca Atkinson-Lord, choreography by Mark Iles, designed by Bethan Viney, lighting by Nathan Benjamin. Barbican Theatre, Plymouth.
- Paperboy adapted from the 2011 memoir of growing up on Belfast's Shankill Road in the 1970s by Tony Macaulay, music by Duke Special, book and lyrics by Andrew Doyle, directed by Steven Dexter and Dean Johnson, choreography by Jennifer Rooney, designed by Natalia Alvarez, musical direction by Matthew Reeve. Lyric Theatre, Belfast.
- Tess of the d'Urbervilles, adapted from Thomas Hardy, devised by Gerry Flanagan, music and lyrics by Pippa Cleary, choreography by Alicia Frost, designed by Natalia Alvarez, musical direction by Cillian Donaghy. The Other Palace, London.
- Jabberwocky created from the characters by Lewis Carroll and Edward Lear, music by Rebecca Applin, book by Susannah Pearse, directed by Luke Sheppard, choreographed by Heather Douglas, designed by Isobel Nicholson, lighting and AV by Jo Stathers, musical direction by Tom Turner. The Other Palace, London.

=== 2017 ===
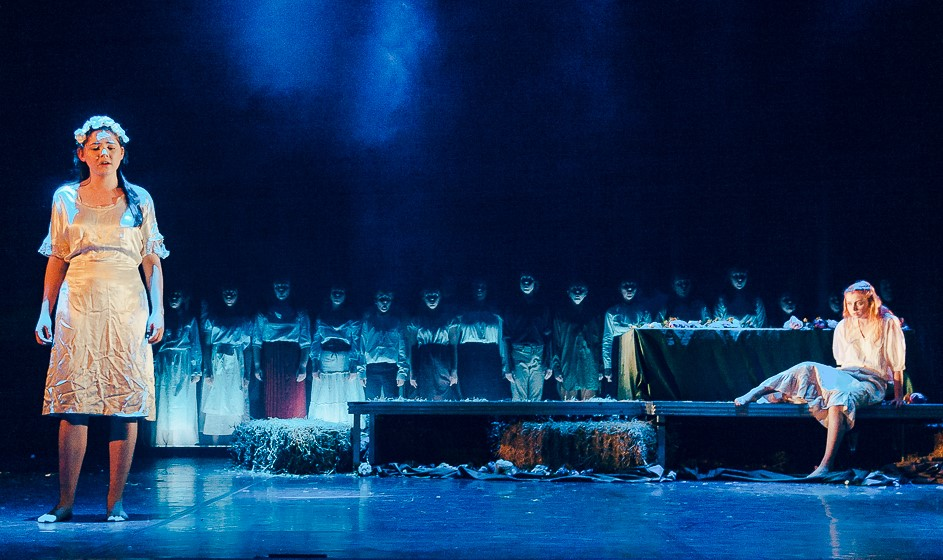
Tess of the d'Urbervilles – Winchester Theatre Royal

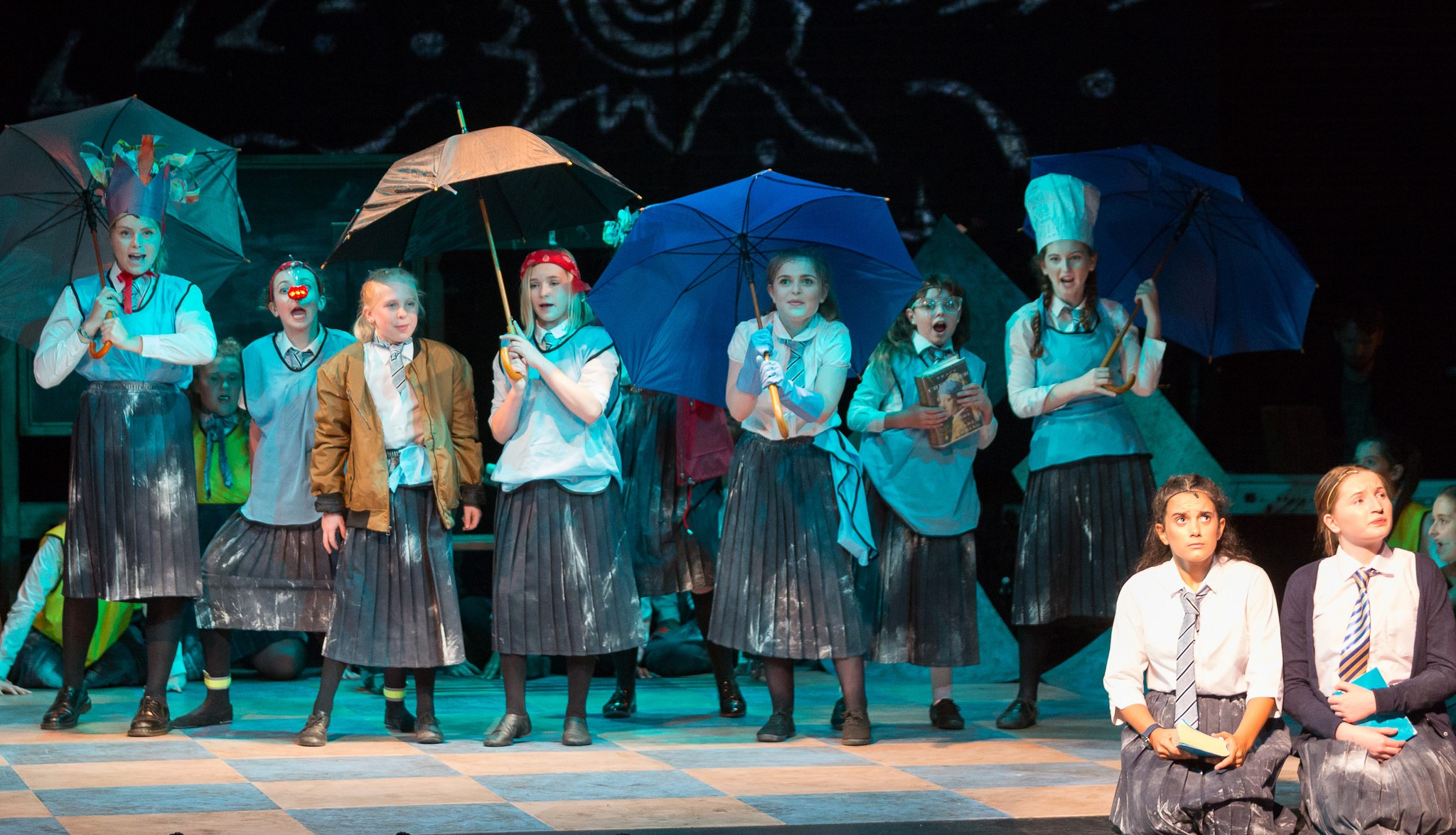
Jabberwocky – Theatre Royal Margate

- Gulliver's Travels, adapted from Jonathan Swift, music by Duke Special, book by Andrew Doyle, directed by Des Kennedy, choreography by Jennifer Rooney, designed by Alyson Cummins. Lyric Theatre, Belfast.
- A Teenage Opera, original music & lyrics by Mark Wirtz & Keith West, adapted by Pete Gallagher, directed by Julie Atherton, choreography by Stuart Rogers, designed by Colin Mayes. South Hill Park Arts Centre, Bracknell. Production live streamed from the theatre.
- Tess of the d'Urbervilles, adapted from Thomas Hardy, devised by Gerry Flanagan, music and lyrics by Pippa Cleary, choreography by Alicia Frost, designed by Natalia Alvarez. Theatre Royal, Winchester.
- More in Common, Dance Connection 3, based on the ideas and political leanings of MP Jo Cox who was murdered in June 2016, devised and choreographed by Jo Meredith, music and lyrics by Michael Grant, directed by Greg Eldridge, lighting by David Hughes. Square Chapel, Halifax.
- Reflections in Swan Lake, Dance Connection 3, devised and choreographed by Rachel Birch-Lawson, music by James Keane, designed by Sophie Barlow. Lilian Baylis Theatre, Sadler's Wells, London.
- Jabberwocky created from the characters by Lewis Carroll and Edward Lear, music by Rebecca Applin, book by Susannah Pearse, directed by Luke Sheppard, choreographed by Heather Douglas, designed by Isobel Nicholson, lighting and AV by Jo Stathers. Theatre Royal, Margate.
- Children of the New Forest adapted from the novel by Frederick Marryat, book, music and lyrics by Jennifer Green and Caroline Wigmore, directed by Ellis Kerkhoven, choreography by Skye Reynolds, designed by Emma Lynch. Barbican Theatre, Plymouth.
- First Ladies, an all-female music theatre work, based on the concept of Hillary Clinton's glass ceiling party, music by Elizabeth Charlesworth, book by Nikki Racklin, directed by Gerard Jones, choreography by Anjali Mehra, designed by Harriet Clarke. Barbican Theatre, Plymouth.

=== 2016 ===
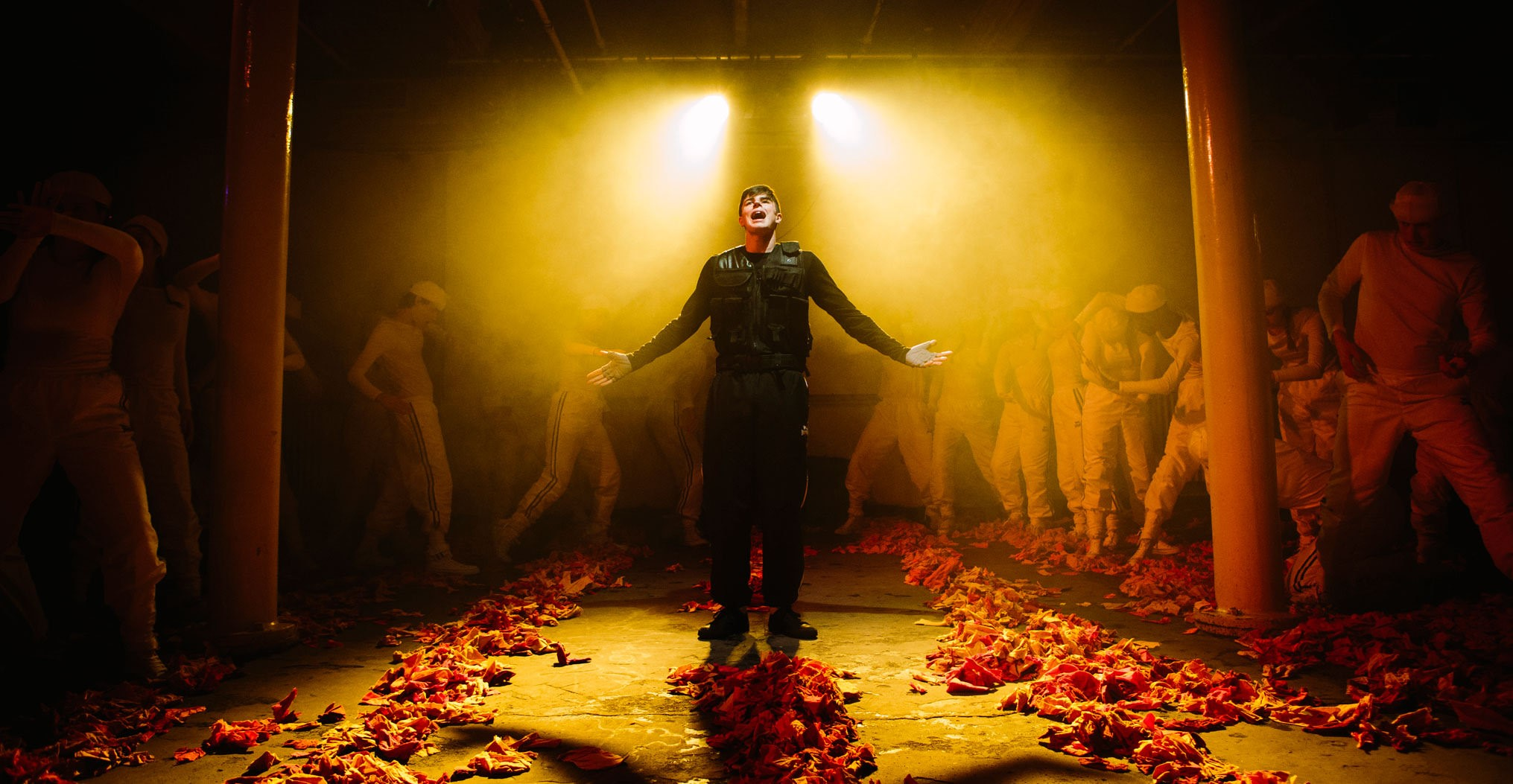
The Dark Tower – Bussey Building, London

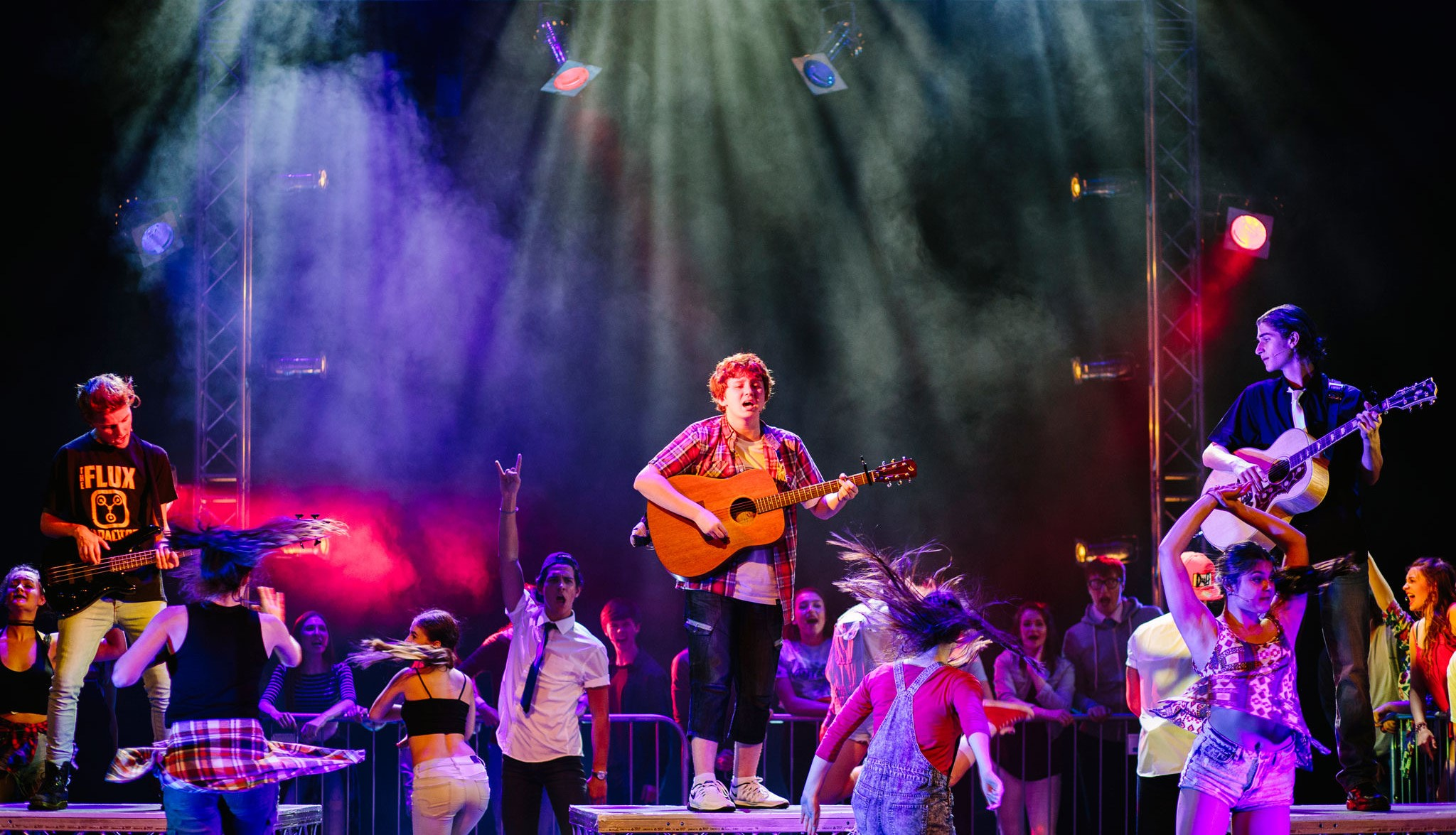
What I Go to School For – Theatre Royal Brighton

- What I Go to School For, the Busted musical, book by Elliot Davis, music by James Bourne and Busted, directed by Steven Dexter, choreographed by Ewan Jones, designed by Sarah Oxley, lighting by Derek Anderson. Theatre Royal, Brighton.
- The Legend of White Bear Lake, a production for younger performers based on a Native American tale from Minnesota, book, music and lyrics by Jennifer Green and Caroline Wigmore, directed by Gemma Fairlie, choreography by Katy Ayling. Barbican Theatre, Plymouth.
- The Dark Tower, a staged oratorio based on the poem Childe Roland to the Dark Tower Came by Robert Browning and further influenced by Louis MacNeice's radio play of 1943 with music by Benjamin Britten, music and lyrics by Conor Mitchell, direction and choreography by Rachel Birch-Lawson, designed by Sophie Barlow. The production was staged over three floors of a converted munitions factory – the CLF-Art Cafe, the Bussey Building, Peckham, London.
- The Great Gatsby adapted from the novel by F. Scott Fitzgerald, music and lyrics by Adam Gerber, book, lyrics and direction by Lewis Barfoot, choreography by Steve Kirkham, designed by Natalia Alvarez. South Hill Park Arts Centre, Bracknell.
- Fight Like A Girl, a musical about female boxing, music by James Atherton, book and lyrics by Nick Stimson, directed by Ellie Jones, choreography by Tony Mills, boxing consultant Mally McIver, designed by Jamie Simmons. Production site specific in the old finishing room at Sunny Bank Mills, Farsley, West Yorkshire.
- Trojan Women, devised with an all-female company around themes of migration in contemporary Europe, music by Francis Goodhand, devised and directed by Stuart Harvey, choreographed by Alicia Frost, designed by Tiffany Dawson.Barbican Theatre, Plymouth.
- MAELSTRØM – Legends of the Underworld, devised from Scottish and Norwegian folk tales, music by Lori Watson, devised and directed by Ellis Kerkhoven, choreography by Deborah Galloway. The Lemon Tree, Aberdeen, as part of the Aberdeen International Youth Festival.
- The Frenzy of Sweeney adapted from the Cycle of Kings, music by Garth McConaghie, lyrics by Aoife Mannix, directed by Bronagh Lagan, choreography by Sarah Golding, lighting and AV by Joe Stathers. Lyric Theatre, Belfast.

=== 2015 ===
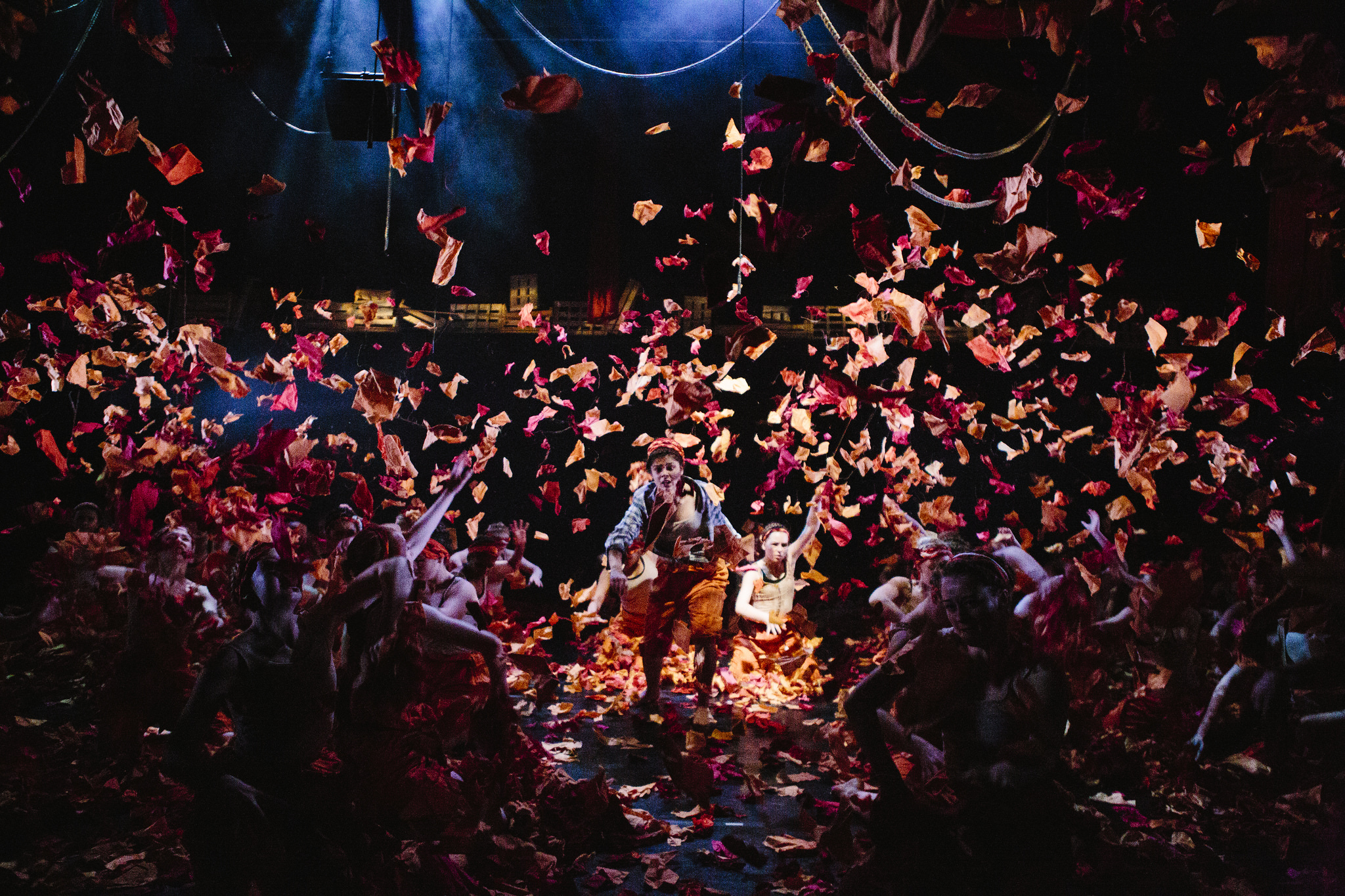
Sweat Factory – Sadler's Wells Theatre, London

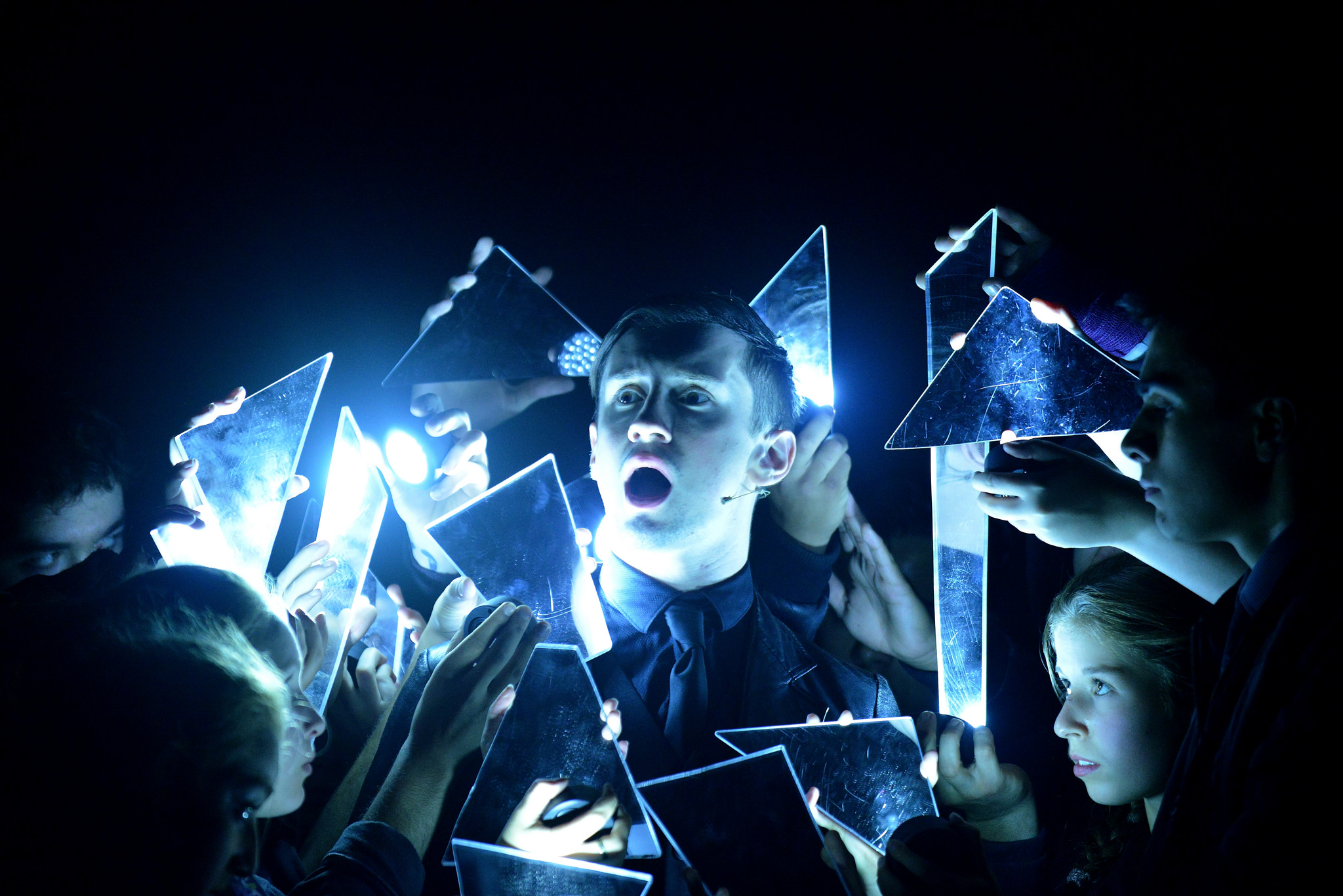
Macbeth – New Town Theatre, Edinburgh Festival fringe

- Gulliver's Travels, adapted from Jonathan Swift, book by Andrew Doyle, music by Duke Special, directed by Des Kennedy, choreography by Jennifer Rooney, designed by Alyson Cummins. Lyric Theatre, Belfast.
- Macbeth adapted from the play by William Shakespeare, music by Garth McConaghie, directed by Stuart Harvey, choreography by Rachel Birch-Lawson, designed by Chris de Wilde, lighting and AV by Joe Stathers. New Town Theatre, Edinburgh Fringe Festival.
- FAGIN based on the character from Charles Dickens' Oliver Twist, music by Paul Kessell-Holland, book and lyrics by Nick Scrivens, directed by Steven Dexter, choreography by Phyllida Crowley-Smith, designed by Sophie Barlow, lighting by Alana Valentine. South Hill Park Arts Centre, Bracknell. Production live streamed from the theatre.
- Not the End of the World adapted from the novel by Geraldine McCaughrean, music by Sonum Batra, lyrics by David Francis, book and direction by Charlotte Conquest, choreography by Stuart Winter, designed by Ryan Dawson-Laight, lighting and AV by Joe Stathers. New Town Theatre, Edinburgh Fringe Festival.
- The Bachelor Girls, an all-female musical about a group of girls leaving school in the aftermath of the First World War, book, music and lyrics by Jennifer Green and Caroline Wigmore, directed by Pete Gallagher, choreographed by Heather Douglas. Barbican Theatre, Plymouth.
- The Dirty Stop Outs, a devised musical developed from interviews and meetings between teenage performers and older British citizens, concept and music by Alex Silverman, devised and directed by Ellie Jones, choreographed by Morag Cross. Square Chapel, Halifax.
- The Midnight Flower Press a musical devised about a group of children distributing surreptitious political material prior to the main reform of labour acts in the mid-nineteenth century, music by Elizabeth Charlesworth, devised and directed by Ellis Kerkhoven, choreographed by Deborah Galloway. Barbican Theatre, Plymouth.
- Sweat Factory, Dance Connection 2, an all-female dance theatre production, devised and choreographed by Rachel Birch-Lawson, music by Garth McConaghie, libretto by Aoife Mannix, designed by Sophie Barlow. Lilian Baylis Theatre, Sadler's Wells, London.
- The Coorie Cave, a musical about a group of young people emerging from a cave into a dystopian world, music by Craig Adams, book and direction by Drew Taylor, choreography by John Ross. Aberdeen Arts Centre as part of as part of the Aberdeen International Youth Festival.

=== 2014 ===
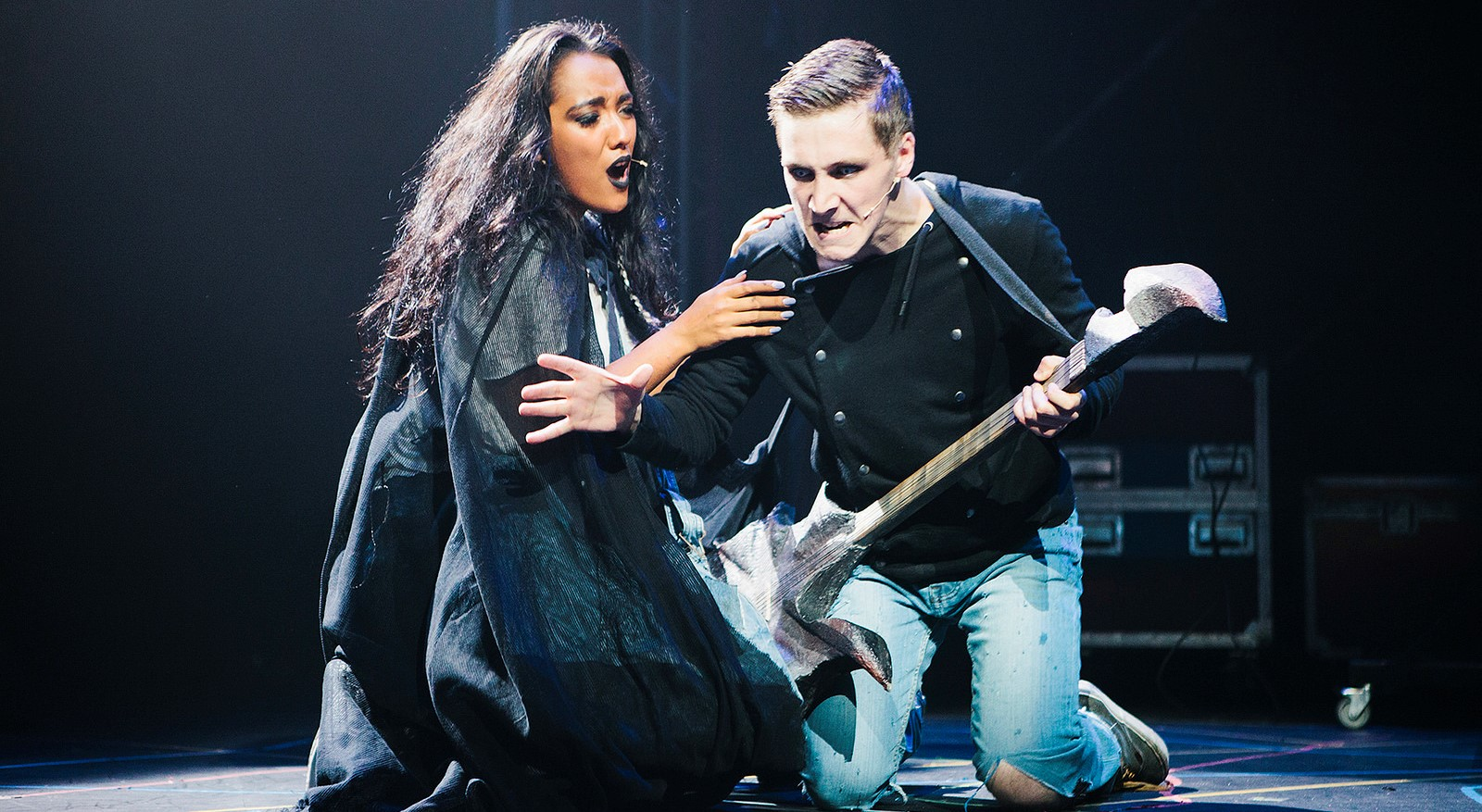
Soul Music – Rose Theatre, Kingston-on-Thames

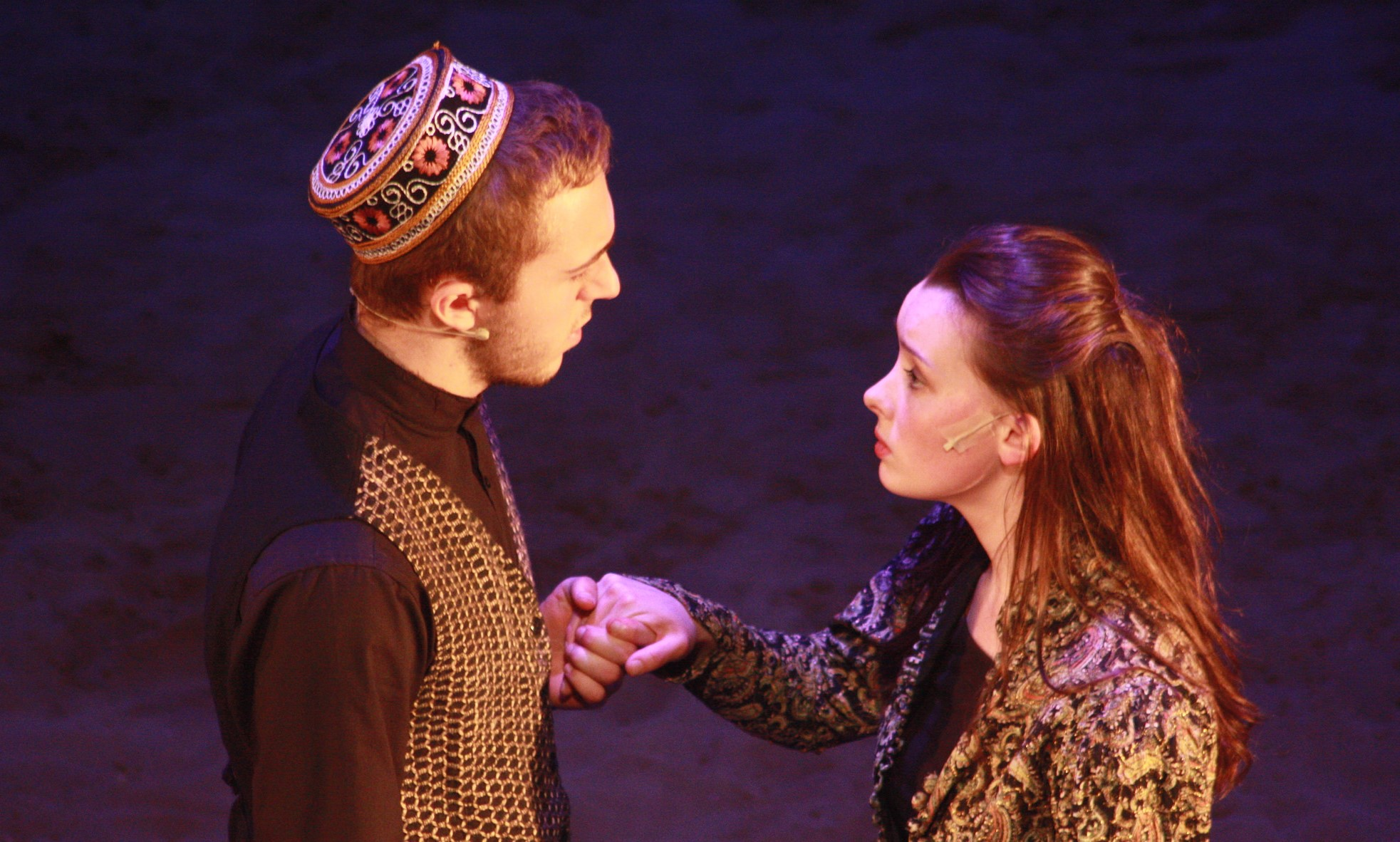
The Making of Ali and Nino – Wilde Theatre, Bracknell

- Not the End of the World adapted from the novel by Geraldine McCaughrean, music by Sonum Batra, lyrics by David Francis, book and direction by Charlotte Conquest, choreography by Darrell Aldridge, designed by Ryan Dawson-Laight, lighting and AV by Joe Stathers. Barbican Theatre, Plymouth.
- Terry Pratchett's Soul Music, music by Craig Adams, book and lyrics by Andrew Doyle, directed by Luke Sheppard, choreography by Cressida Carre, scenery designed by Victoria Spearing, costumes and puppetry by John Barber, lighting by Chris Withers. Rose Theatre, Kingston.
- The Making of Ali and Nino, adapted and devised from the novel by Kurban Said (pseudonym) and inspired by Tom Reiss's The Orientalist which makes the case for Lev Nussimbaum as the author, adaptation and direction by Joe Douglas, music by Tarek Merchant, movement consultant Maxine Braham, choreography by Emily Holt. South Hill Park Arts Centre, Bracknell. Production live streamed from the theatre.
- Miss Interpreted, a musical devised with the all-female company about their experiences of growing up as young women in the 21st century, music by James Atherton, devised and directed by Ellie Jones, choreography by Morag Cross. Square Chapel, Halifax.
- Triptych, three musicals commissioned from female composers under the age of 30, "A Lie" music by Elizabeth Charlesworth, "Genetics" music by Polina Nayakinskaya, "Pearl" music by Laura McGarrigle, directed by Kath Burlinson, choreography by Heather Douglas, musical direction by Derek Barnes. The MAC, Belfast.
- Dance Connection 1, all-female dance theatre, devised and choreographed by Rachel Birch-Lawson, music and arrangements by Garth McConaghie and Nathan Jones, additional music by Conor Mitchell, designed by Sophie Barlow. Barbican Theatre, Plymouth.
- Harvest Fire, a devised musical based on the Burning Man Festival in Nevada and Harvest Festival (Lúnasa) in Scotland, music and lyrics by Mairi Campbell and David Francis, devised and directed by Lewis Barfoot, choreography by Tom Jackson Greaves. The Lemon Tree, Aberdeen as part of the Aberdeen International Youth Festival.
- Macbeth adapted from the play by William Shakespeare, music by Garth McConaghie, directed by Stuart Harvey, choreography by Rachel Birch-Lawson, designed by Chris de Wilde, lighting and AV by Joe Stathers, musical direction by Shane McVicker. Lyric Theatre, Belfast.

=== 2013 ===
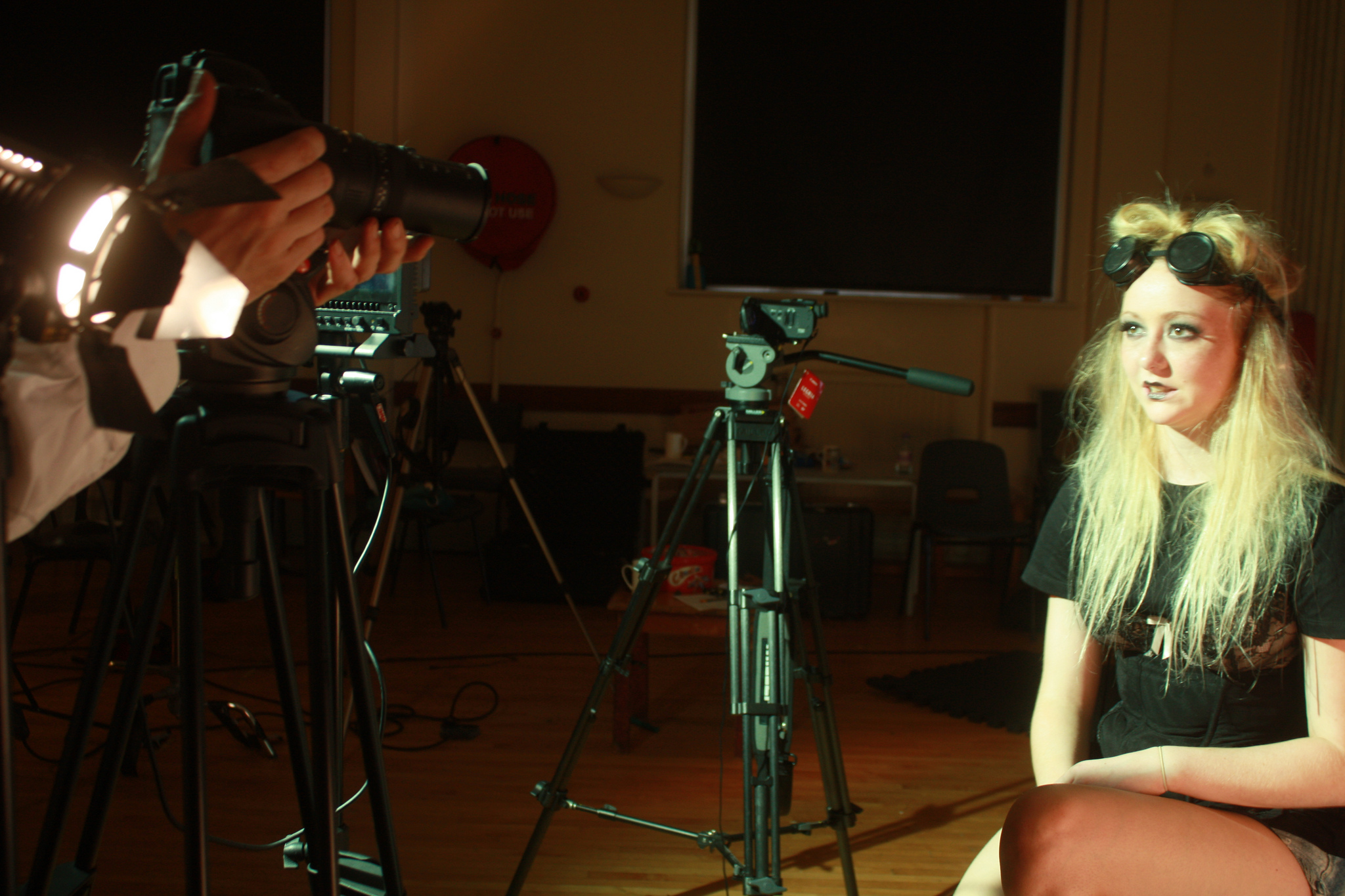
Vanishing Point – film shot in Plymouth

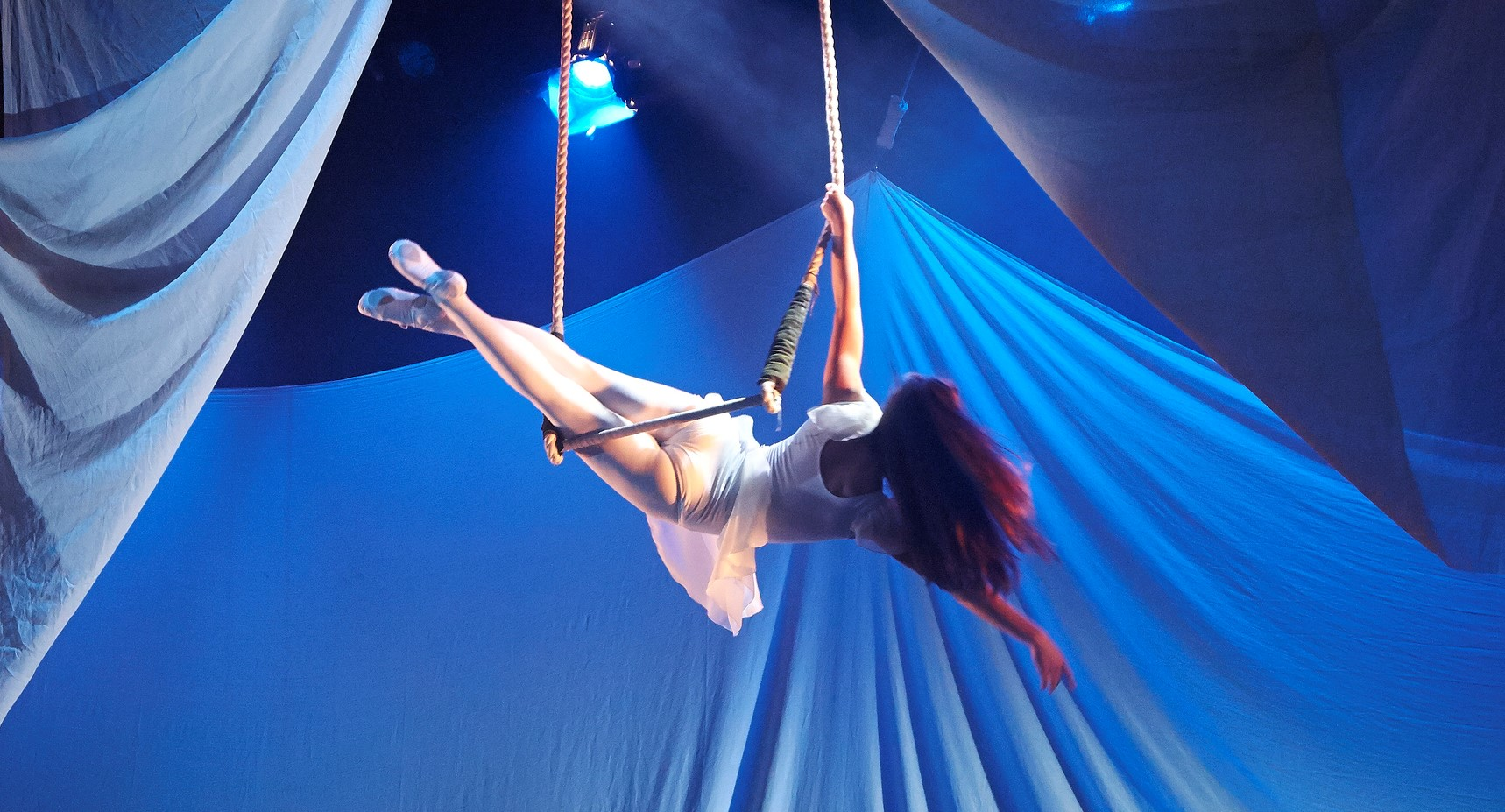
Variété – Riverside Studios, London

- Vanishing Point, a musical film, contemporary version of the Pied Piper story, music by Rebecca Applin, book and direction by Ellie Jones, choreography by Lucie Pankhurst, designed by Sarah Oxley, co-produced with Martin Wright for Gamelab UK. Filmed on location in Plymouth.
- According to Brian Haw, a musical about the political campaigner Brian Haw who camped for 10 years outside the British Parliament to protest about British foreign policy, from a concept by Eddie Latter, music by James Atherton, book and lyrics by Sarah Nelson, directed by Ellie Jones, movement by Eddie Latter, designed by Hannah Boothman. Riverside Studios, London.
- Variété, story and original concept Lindsay Kemp from the 1997 production at Hackney Empire, music by Carlos Miranda, directed by Kinny Gardner, choreography by Darryl Aldridge, designed by Chris de Wilde, musical direction by Sam Sommerfeld. Riverside Studios, London.
- Burnt Out Souls, an original story set in a future world where the inhabitants have been wiped of personality, music by Alexander Rudd, book by David Gale, directed by Hilary Westlake, choreography by Heather Douglas, designed by Chris de Wilde. Riverside Studios, London.
- The Dark Tower, a staged oratorio based on the poem Childe Roland to the Dark Tower Came by Robert Browning and further influenced by Louis MacNeice's radio play of 1943 with music by Benjamin Britten, music and lyrics by Conor Mitchell, direction and choreography by Rachel Birch-Lawson, designed by Chris de Wilde. Riverside Studios, London.
- Great Expectations, adapted from the novel by Charles Dickens, music by Annemarie Lewis Thomas, book and direction by Gerry Flanagan, choreography by Yael Lowenstein, designed by Rebecca Lee, lighting by David Phillips, musical direction by Gemma Hawkins. Rose Theatre, Kingston
- Terry Pratchett's Soul Music, music by Craig Adams, book and lyrics by Andrew Doyle, directed by Luke Sheppard, choreography by Cressida Carre, scenery designed by Victoria Spearing, costumes and puppetry by John Barber, lighting by Chris Withers. South Hill Park Arts Centre, Bracknell.
- Le Tabou, based both on the surrealist novel Froth on the Daydream (French: L'Écume des jours; literally: "The Foam of Days") and the life of its author Boris Vian, music and lyrics by Gwyneth Herbert, devised and directed by Kath Burlinson, movement and design by Juliette Jeanclaude. Barbican Theatre, Plymouth.
- OMG: Ovid Unplugged, a devised, all-female piece of music theatre re-envisioning Ovid's stories in a contemporary world, music by William Morris, devised and directed by Di Sherlock, choreography by Ita O'Brien. Square Chapel, Halifax.
- The Drowning Pond adapted from the novel by Catherine Forde, music by MJ McCarthy, directed by Joe Douglas, choreography by Vicki Manderson, musical arrangements and direction by Adam Gerber. The Lemon Tree as part of the Aberdeen International Youth Festival.

=== 2012 Loserville ===
- Loserville, originally commissioned as a YMT production in 2009, opened at the West Yorkshire Playhouse (now Leeds Playhouse) as a professional production produced by Kevin Wallace Ltd, West Yorkshire Playhouse, TC Beech Ltd and Youth Music Theatre UK. The creative team were substantially the same as for the YMT 2009 production: additional music and lyrics by James Bourne, book by Elliot Davis, directed by Steven Dexter, choreography by Nick Winston, music supervision by Martin Lowe. The production was designed by Francis O'Connor and lighting was by Howard Harrison, sound design by Simon Baker, musical direction by Jim Henson, casting by Anne Vosser, photography Tristram Kenton. Following the run at the West Yorkshire Playhouse, the production transferred to the Garrick Theatre in London's West End. It opened on 17 October 2012 and ran until 5 January 2013. The production was later nominated for an Olivier Award for Best New Musical. It is now licensed by Music Theatre International for both amateur and professional performances.

=== 2012 ===
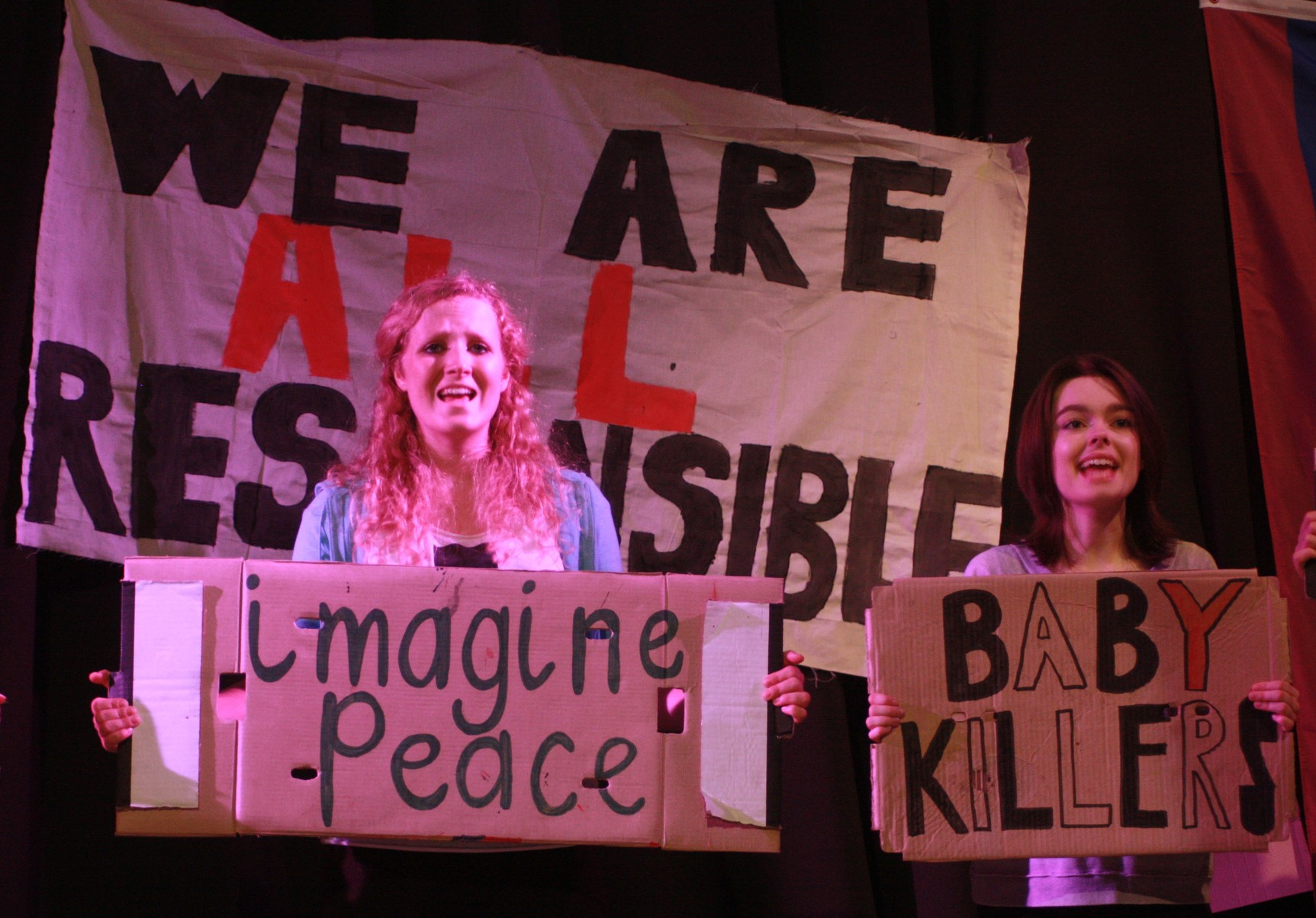
According to Brian Haw – Riverside Studios, London

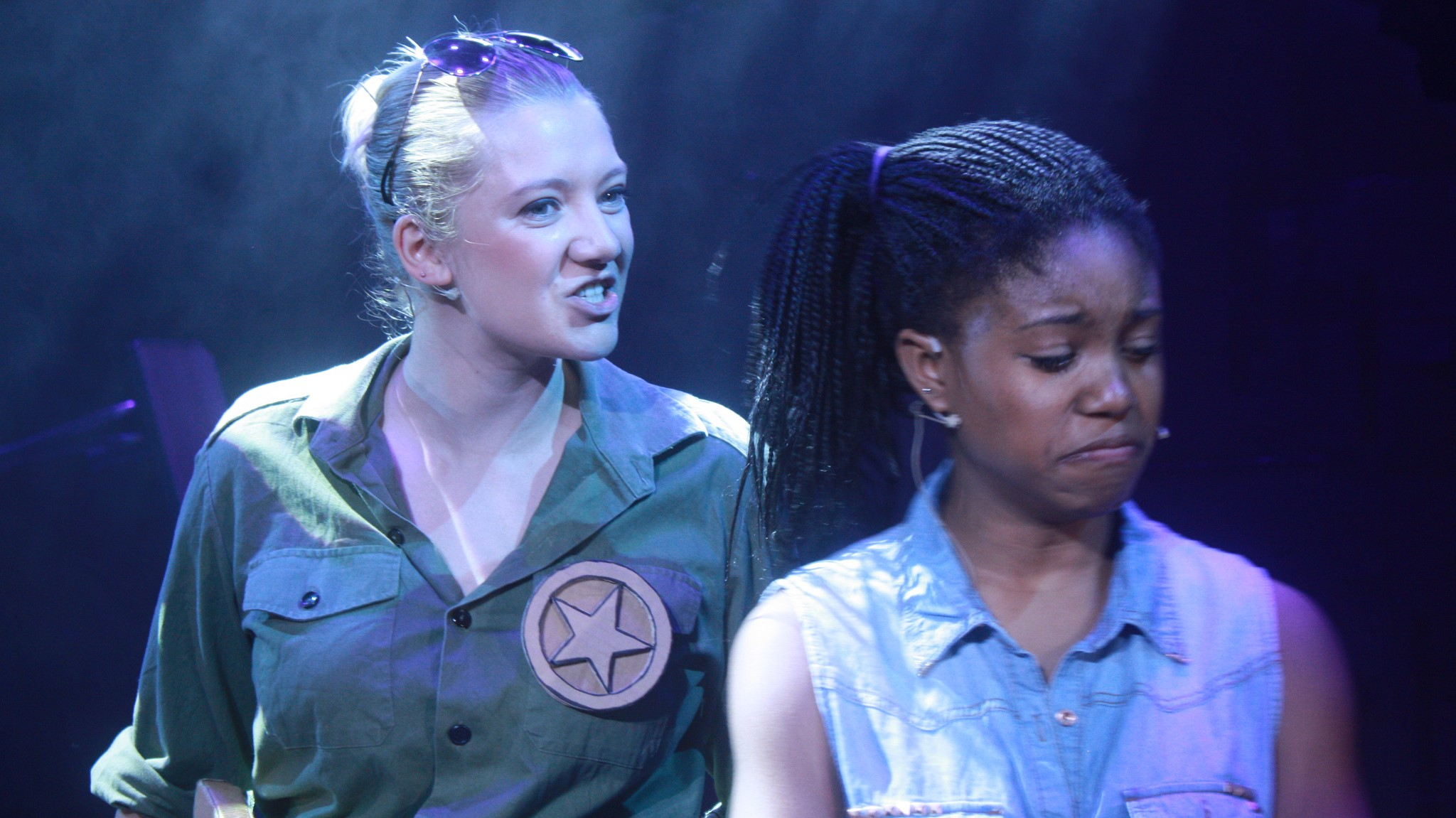
Out There – Riverside Studios, London

- According to Brian Haw, a musical about the political campaigner Brian Haw who camped for 10 years outside the British Parliament to protest about British foreign policy, from a concept by Eddie Latter, music by James Atherton, book and lyrics by Sarah Nelson, directed by Ellie Jones, movement by Eddie Latter, designed by Hannah Boothman. Square Chapel, Halifax.
- Terry Pratchett's Mort, adapted from the novel, music by Dominic Haslam, book by Jenifer Toksvig, directed by Luke Sheppard, choreography by Heather Douglas, scenery designed by Victoria Spearing, musical direction by Chris Huntley. Rose Theatre, Kingston.
- Tess of the d'Urbervilles adapted from the novel by Thomas Hardy, music and musical direction by Pippa Cleary, book and direction by Gerry Flanagan, choreography by Yael Lowenstein, designed by Charlotte Bakewell.
- Macbeth adapted from the play by William Shakespeare, music by Garth McConaghie, directed by Stuart Harvey, choreography by Rachel Birch-Lawson, designed by Emma Kesterton, musical direction by Oliver McCallion. South Hill Park Arts Centre, Bracknell.
- The Salsa Sisters, inspired by the Cuban band Anacaona, Cuba's First All-Girl Dance Band, music and lyrics by Tarek Merchant, book by Linda Walton with additional material by Steven Dexter, directed by Steven Dexter, choreography by Miriam Faura, designed by Hollie Ketley, musical direction by Tarek Merchant. Barbican Theatre, Plymouth.
- The Vortex, a work for younger teenagers based on the concept of a time shift, music by Rebecca Applin, devised and directed by Ellis Kerkhoven, choreography by Vincent Manna, designed by Ashleigh Moore. Fettes College School Theatre, Edinburgh.
- Nikki and the Gang, a new contemporary musical in the style of The Famous Five, music and lyrics by Mairi Campbell and David Francis, book by Alan Bissett, directed and choreographed by Gemma Fairlie, designed by Bryony Dowell, musical direction by Mairi Campbell. The Lemon Tree, Aberdeen, as part of the Aberdeen International Youth Festival.
- The Seventh Muse, a devised, all-female musical discovering the goddess in every woman, music by Craig Adams, devised and directed by Lewis Barfoot, choreography by Tom Jackson Greaves, designed by Rhiannon Clarke. Barbican Theatre, Plymouth.

=== 2011 ===
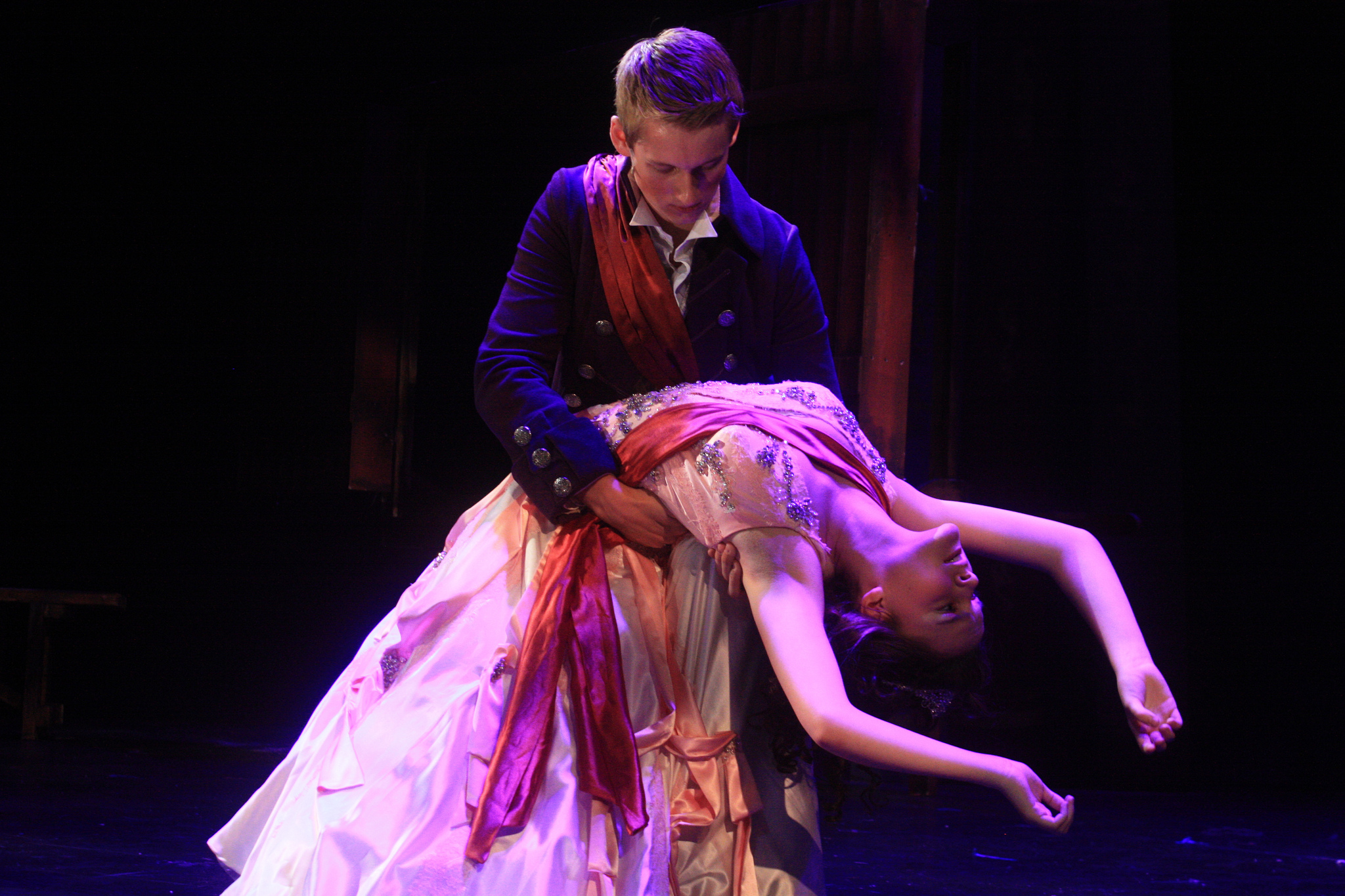
Terry Pratchett's Mort – Greenwich Theatre, London

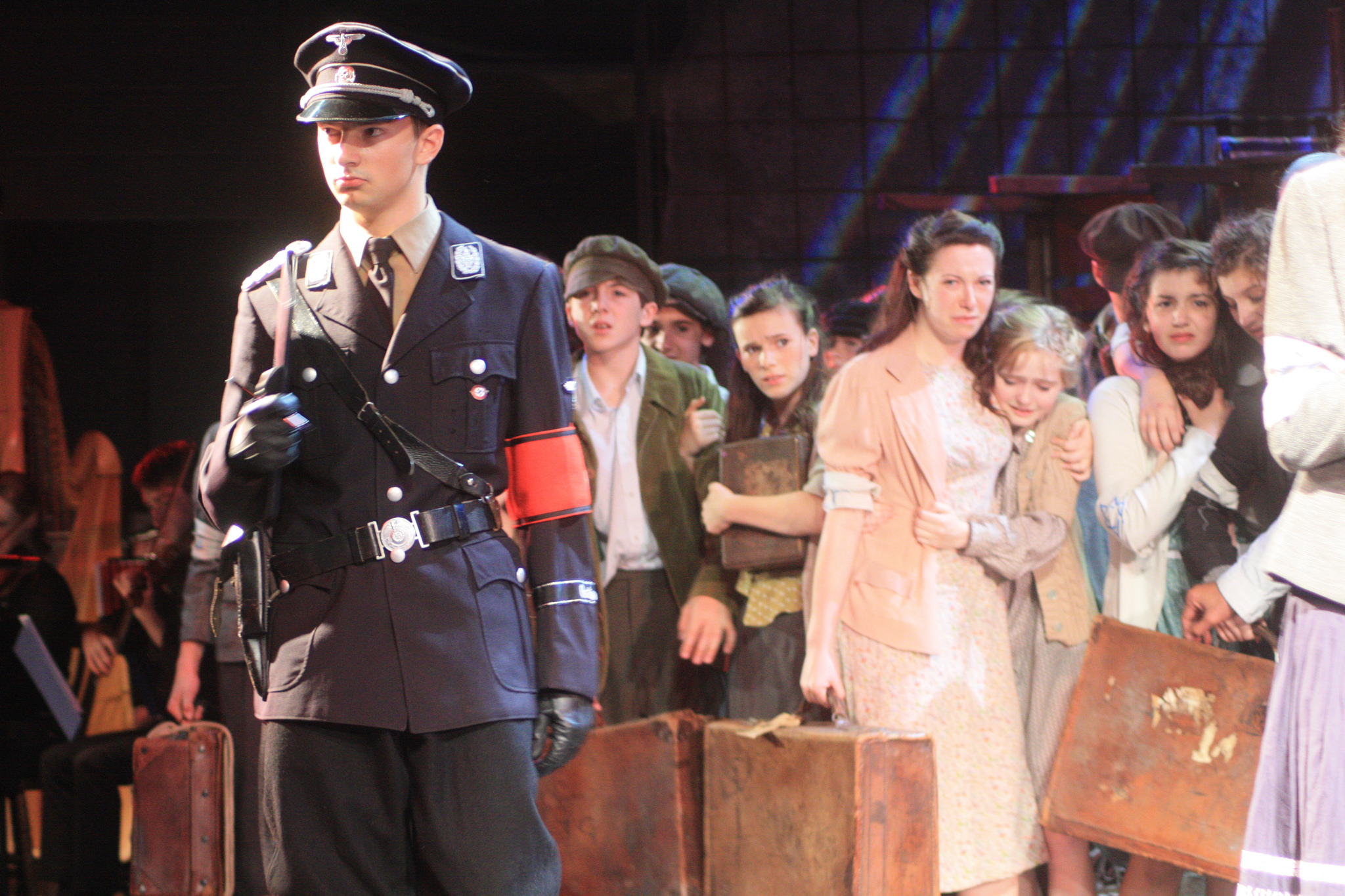
Korczak – Rose Theatre, Kingston-on-Thames

- Terry Pratchett's Mort, adapted from the novel, music by Dominic Haslam, book by Jenifer Toksvig, directed by Luke Sheppard, choreography by Heather Douglas, scenery designed by Victoria Spearing, musical direction by Francis Goodhand. Greenwich Theatre.
- Korczak, an original musical about the life of Janusz Korczak and the 200 children he protected, and died with, in the Warsaw ghetto in 1942, music by Chris Williams, book and direction by Nick Stimson, choreography by Yael Lowenstein, designed by Liz Cooke. Rose Theatre, Kingston.
- Out There, an original musical imagining an Apollo astronaut who mysteriously disappears in 1969, music by James Bourne, book and lyrics by Elliot Davis, directed by Steven Dexter, choreography by Nick Winston, designed by Alex Doidge-Green, lighting by Alan Valentine, musical direction by Caroline Humphries and Elliot Davis. South Hill Park Arts Centre, Bracknell.
- Jabberwocky created from the characters by Lewis Carroll and Edward Lear, music by Rebecca Applin, book by Susannah Pearse, directed by Joe Douglas, choreographed by Vincent Manna, designed by Charlotte Bakewell. Barbican Theatre, Plymouth.
- Macbeth, a new music theatre version responding to the 2011 summer of riots in London, adapted from Shakespeare's play, music by Garth McConaghie, directed by Stuart Harvey, choreography by Kate Sagovsky. Drill Hall, London.
- Love and Madness, a Commedia dell'arte musical set in Renaissance Italy, music by James Atherton, devised and directed by Gerry Flanagan, choreography by Lucy Pankhurst. Barbican Theatre, Plymouth.
- Tales from the World's End, drawn from the work of Duncan Williamson a Scottish storyteller and singer, and a member of the Scottish Traveller community who lived on the road in Scotland and left a legacy of many thousands of traveller's tales, music by Mairi Campbell, lyrics by David Francis, devised and directed by Kath Burlinson. The Lemon Tree, Aberdeen, as part of the Aberdeen International Youth Festival.

=== 2010 ===
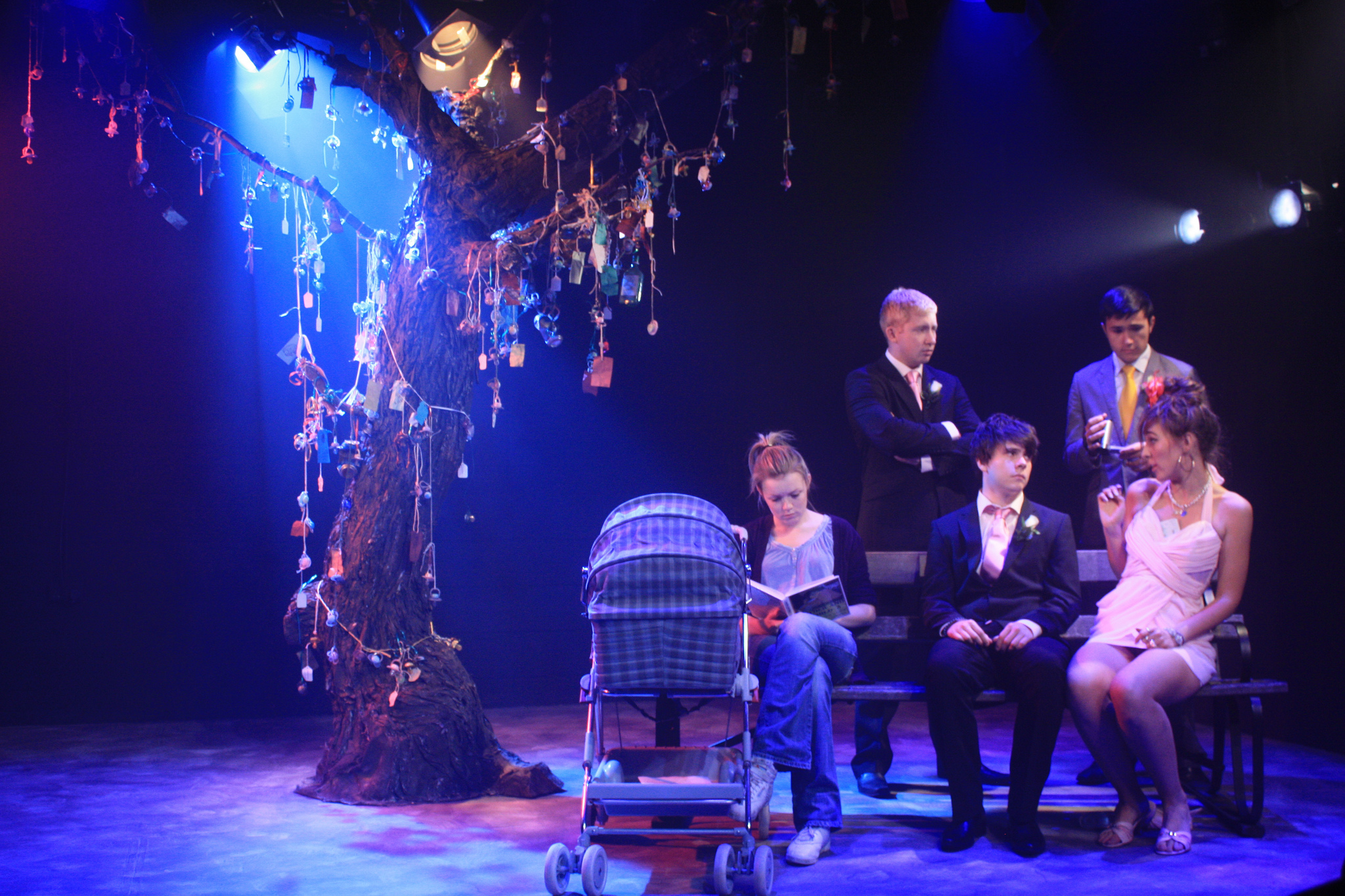
The Dummy Tree – Tristan Bates Theatre, London

- Gershwin's Gals, reflections on George Gershwin, music by Conor Mitchell and George Gershwin, book and direction by Rachel O'Riordan. Barbican Theatre, Plymouth.
- The Dummy Tree, an original musical originally workshopped by YMT and the National Theatre for NT Connections and later performed as a YMT production, music book and lyrics by Conor Mitchell, directed by Stuart Harvey, designed by Chris de Wilde, musical direction by Chris Huntley. Tristan Bates Theatre, London.
- The Savage adapted from the novel by David Almond, concept and music by Harvey Brough, book by Jenifer Toksvig, directed and choreographed by Leah Hausman, designed by Rachel Bamford. Casterton School, Cumbria.
- Scheherazade based upon ancient tales from the Arabian Nights, music by James Atherton, devised and directed by Gerry Flanagan, choreography by Yael Lowenstein, designed by Joanne Wagstaff. Bradford Playhouse.
- A Beggar's Opera, a modernised version of John Gay's 1728 ballad opera, music by Jimmy Jewell, book, lyrics and direction by Nick Stimson. South Hill Park Arts Centre, Bracknell.
- Peter Pan, a one act version, music by Jimmy Jewell, book and lyrics by Nick Stimson, directed by Christian Durham, designed by Chris de Wilde. Licensed Victualler's School Theatre, Ascot.
- A Song for Eurydice, a musical version of the classical tale updated to 1950s Paris, music by Garth McConaghie, devised and directed by Stuart Harvey, choreography by Kate Sagovsky. Barbican Theatre, Plymouth.
- Ghosts of the Past, music composed by Craig Adams, book and lyrics by Clare Prenton. Aberdeen Arts Centre as part of the Aberdeen International Youth Festival.

=== 2009 ===
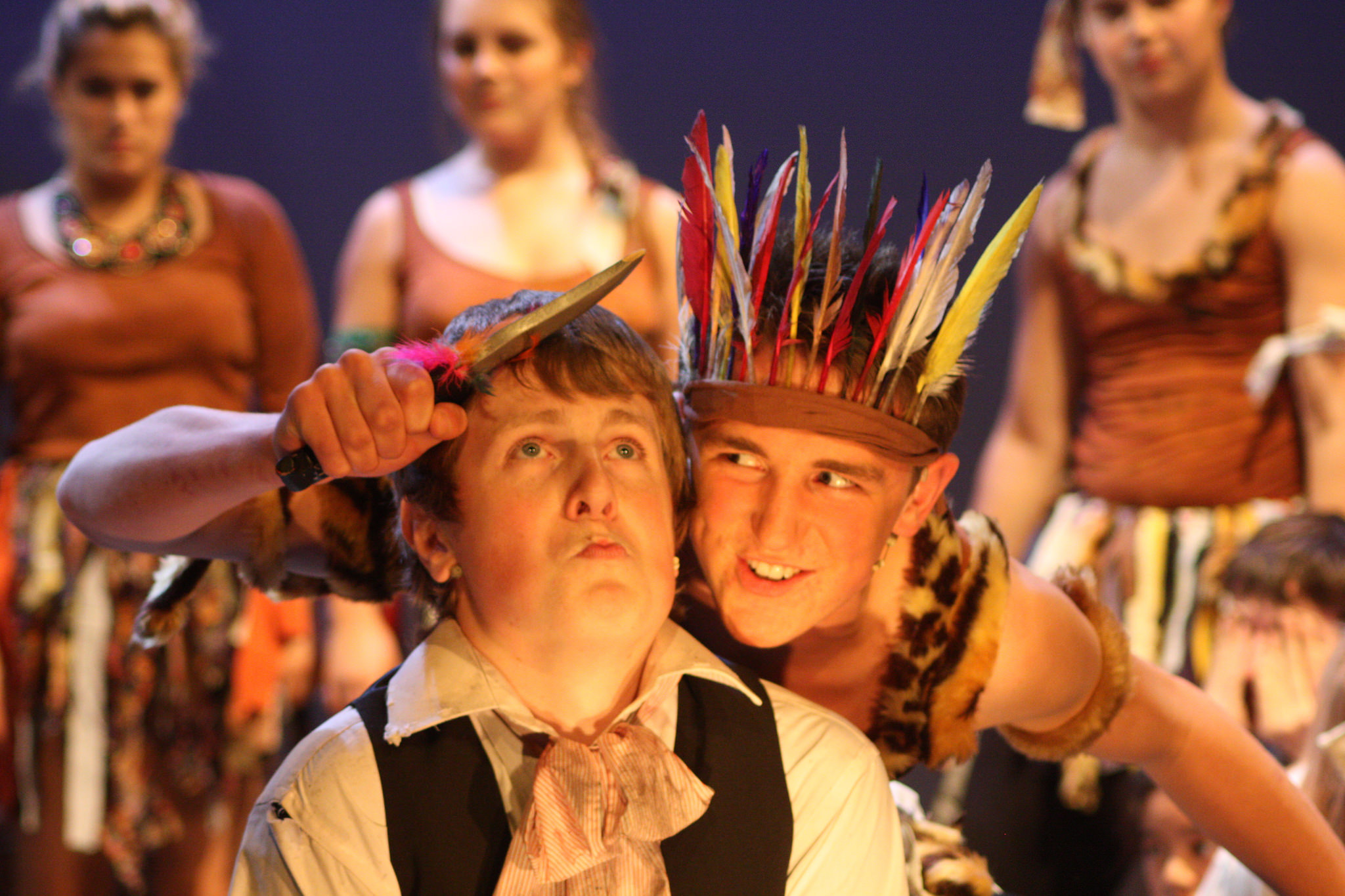
Peter Pan – Barbican Theatre, Plymouth

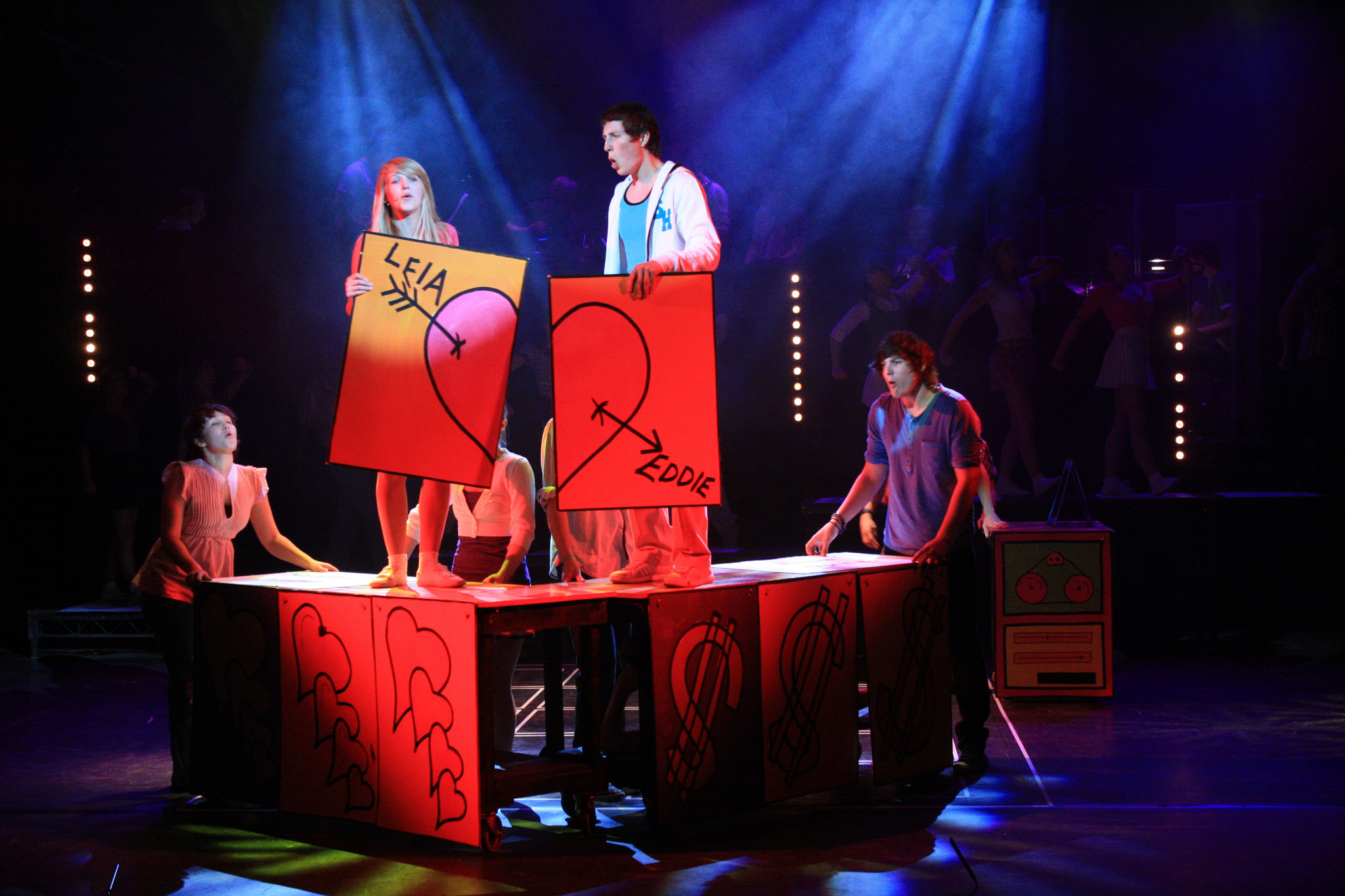
Loserville the Musical – South Hill Park Arts Centre, Bracknell

- Loserville: the Musical, created from the music on the album Welcome to Loserville by the band Son of Dork, additional music and lyrics by James Bourne, book by Elliot Davis, directed by Steven Dexter, choreography by Nick Winston, musical direction by Martin Lowe, lighting by Alan Valentine. South Hill Park Arts Centre, Bracknell.
- Peter Pan, a one act version, music by Jimmy Jewell, book and lyrics by Nick Stimson, directed by Christian Durham, designed by Chris de Wilde. Barbican Theatre, Plymouth, and the Bridewell Theatre, London.
- According to Brian Haw, a musical about the political campaigner Brian Haw who camped for 10 years outside the British Parliament to protest about British foreign policy, music by James Atherton, directed by Eddie Latter. Barbican Theatre, Plymouth.
- A Winter's Tale adapted from Shakespeare's The Winter's Tale, set in an unnamed Soviet country in the early 1950s and a Mediterranean island during the Summer of Love in 1967, music and lyrics by Howard Goodall, book and direction by Nick Stimson, choreography by Clare Dale, designed by Chris de Wilde, musical direction by Jon Laird. Yvonne Arnaud Theatre, Guildford.
- Eight, a devised all-female musical, music by Conor Mitchell, devised and directed by Kath Burlinson. Casterton School, Cumbria.
- The Watchers, vampires and coming of age in Whitby, music and musical direction by Craig Adams, book and direction by Clare Prenton. Bradford Playhouse.
- The Chosen Room, a social media musical Act 1 & 2, music and musical direction by Mark Dogherty, book and lyrics by Marie Jones, directed by Syd Ralph, choreography by Gail Davies. Stranmillis College, Belfast.
- Fool's Gold, a commedia dell'arte musical about a wayward daughter, an alchemist and a bitter servant, music by Annemarie Lewis Thomas, devised and directed by Gerry Flanagan, choreography by Yael Lowenstein, designed by Katie O'Brien. Barbican Theatre, Plymouth.

=== 2008 ===
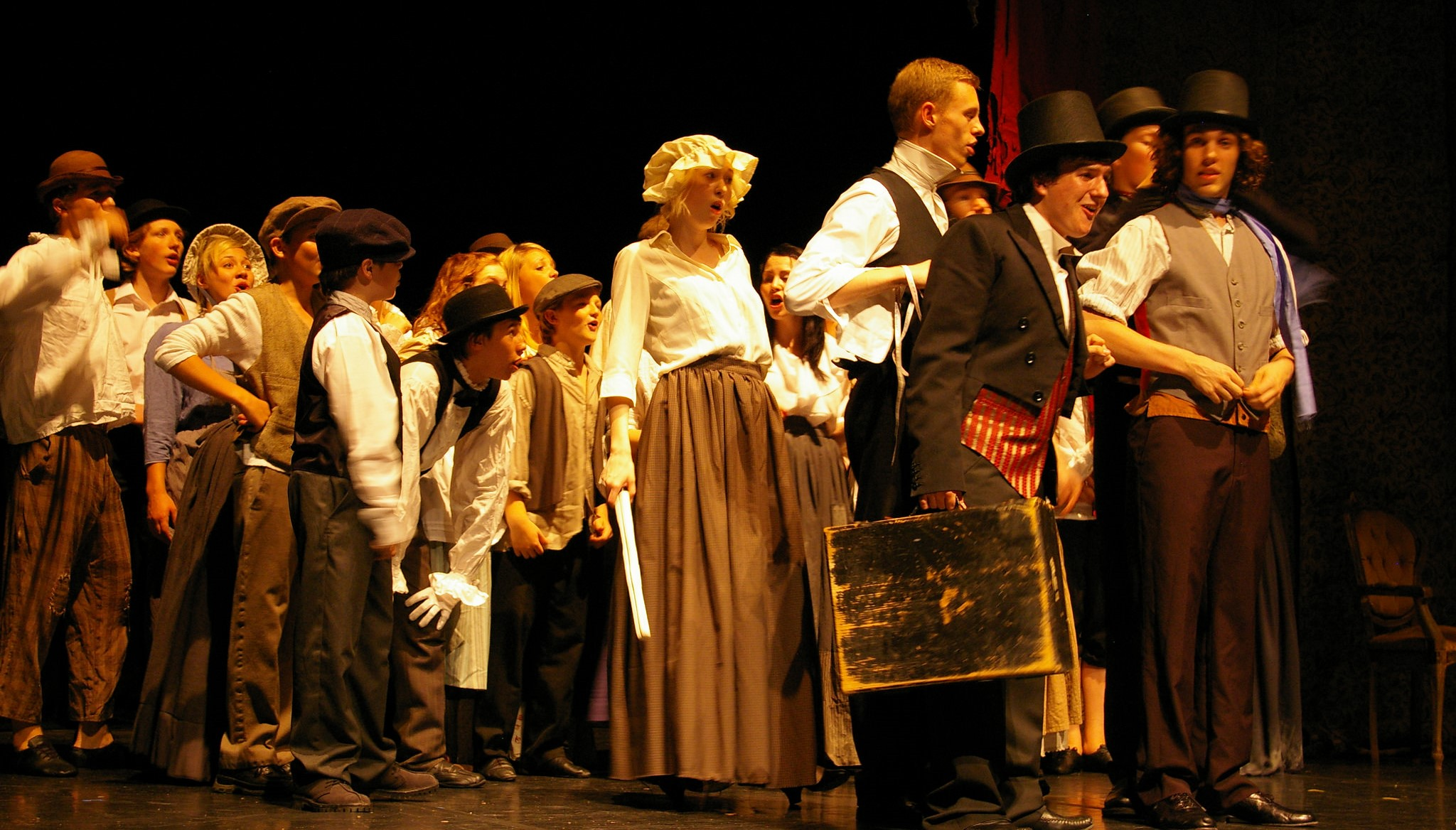
Great Expectations – South Hill Park Arts Centre, Bracknell

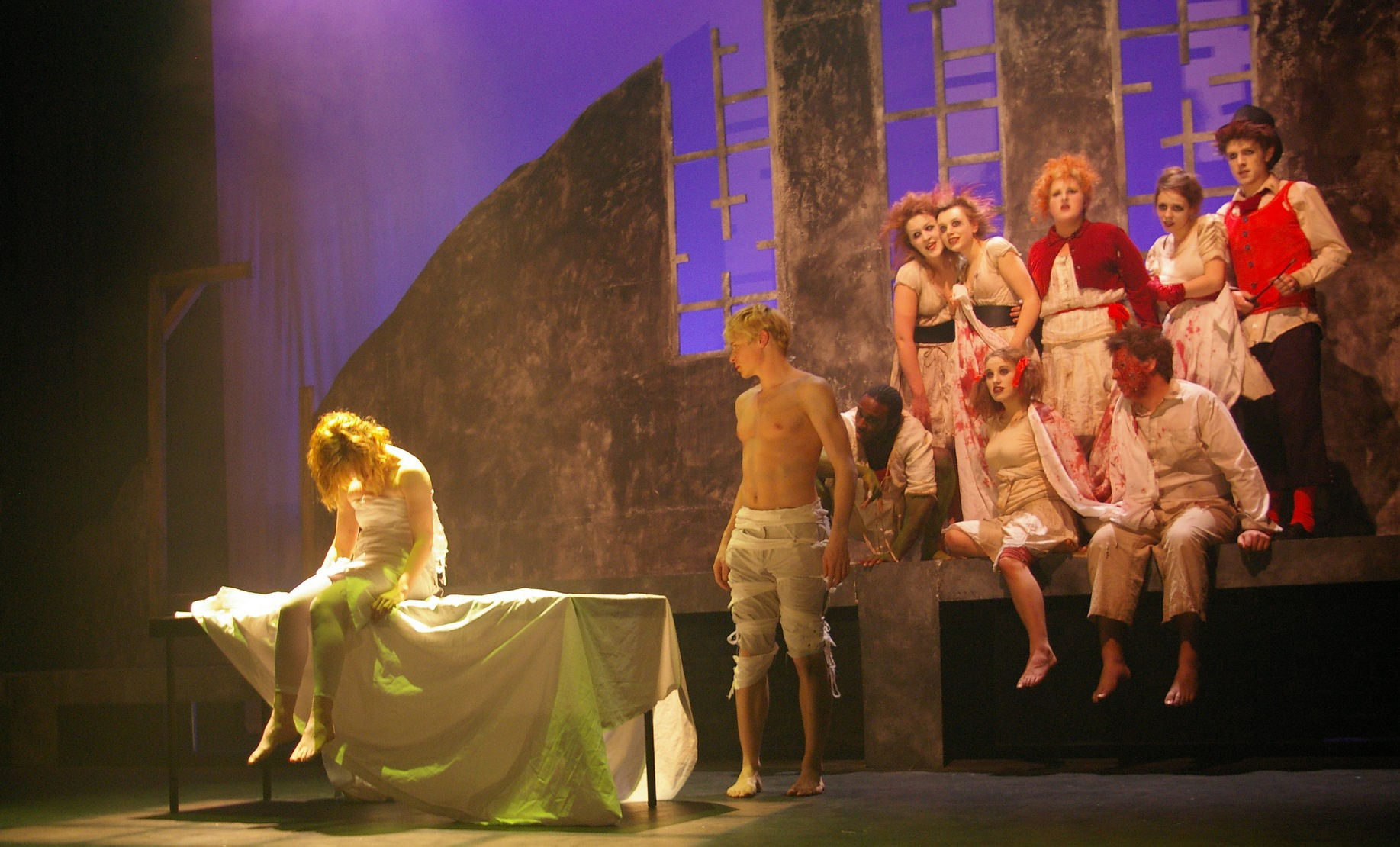
Frankenstein – Cochrane Theatre, London

- Terry Pratchett's Mort, adapted from the novel, music by Dominic Haslam, book by Jenifer Toksvig, directed by Clive Paget, choreography by Lucie Pankhurst, designed by Sharon Davey, musical direction by Jan Winstone. Yvonne Arnaud Theatre, Guildford.
- Endangered, a devised piece of music theatre about endangered species, music by Jonathan Cooper, directed by Peta Lily, choreography by Vincent Manna. Barbican Theatre, Plymouth.
- Dead Heat, a musical about the world of celebrity magazines, music and lyrics by Alexander Bermange, book by Steve Keyworth, direction by Alison Goldie. Bradford Playhouse.
- Missing Mel, a musical about the impact on a group of teenagers returning to school to find that their friend, Mel, has disappeared, music and lyrics by Conor Mitchell, book by Kath Burlinson, directed by Pete Gallagher, choreography by Tony Mills, designed by Mercedes Said. George Square Theatre as part of the Edinburgh Fringe Festival and Cochrane Theatre, London.
- The Chosen Room, a social media musical Act 1, music and musical direction by Mark Dogherty, book and lyrics by Marie Jones, directed by Syd Ralph, choreography by Gail Davies. Stranmillis College, Belfast.
- Peter Pan, a one act version, music by Jimmy Jewell, book and lyrics by Nick Stimson, directed by Nick Stimson, choreography by Claire Russ, designed by Holly White, musical direction by Nik Haley. Barbican Theatre, Plymouth.
- Great Expectations, adapted from the novel by Charles Dickens, music by Annemarie Lewis Thomas, devised and directed by Gerry Flanagan, choreography by Sheena Kelly, designed by Emily Raemakers. Aberdeen Arts Centre as part of the Aberdeen International Youth Festival.
- Frankenstein, adapted from the novel by Mary Shelley, music by Jimmy Jewell, book and lyrics by Nick Stimson, choreography by Claire Russ, designed by Minna Gibbs-Nicholls, musical direction Jon Laird. Cochrane Theatre, London.
- The Silver Bough, inspired by books of the same name by the Scottish folklorist F. Marian McNeill, music by Gerard McBurney, book by Iain Finlay Macleod, devised and directed by Kath Burlinson, choreography by Struan Leslie, designed by Ashley Bolitho, musical direction by Simon Deacon. Aberdeen Grammar School as part of the Aberdeen International Youth Festival.

=== 2007 ===
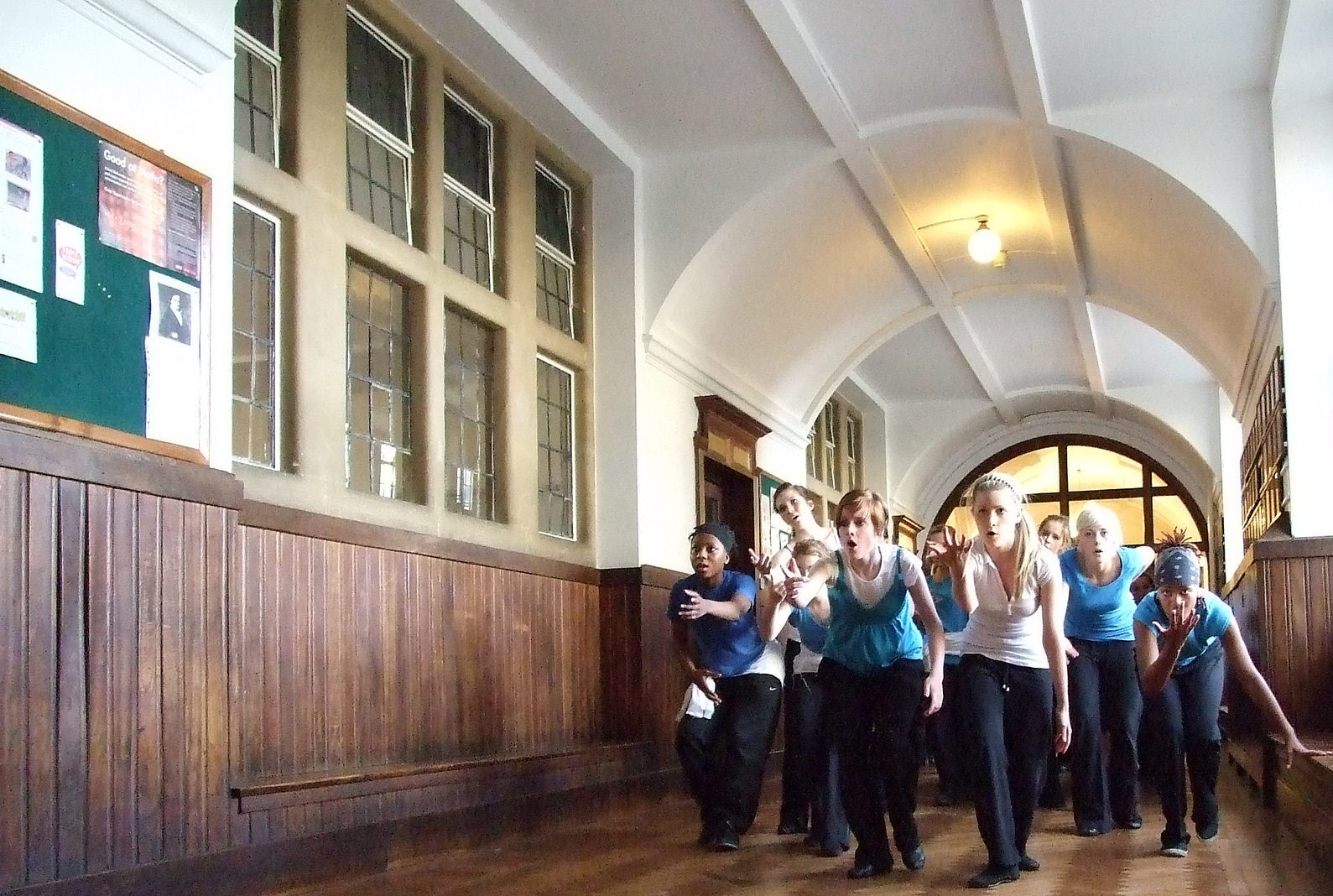
Rare Dreams – Downside Abbey, Somerset

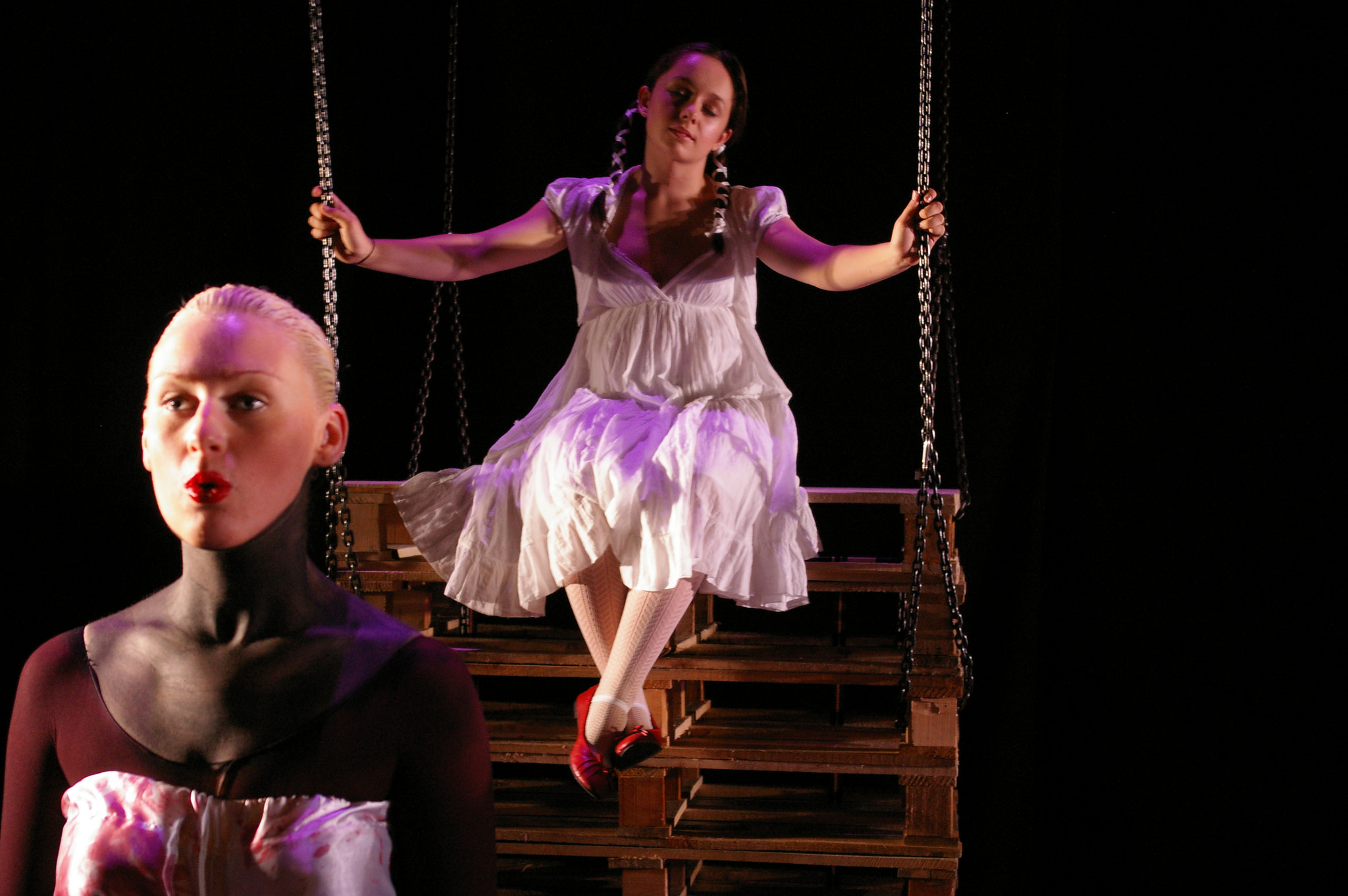
The Time of Our Freedom – Waterfront Hall, Belfast

- The Time of Our Freedom, a piece of music theatre based on Pesach or the Passover, music by Conor Mitchell, book and lyric by Matthew Hurt, directed by Matt Peover, choreography by Luca Silvestrini, designed by Fabrice Serafino. Waterfront Hall, Belfast.
- Grace Online, a musical about online identities, music by Garth McConaghie, devised and directed by Des Kennedy, choreography by Lucy Cullingford. The Chapel, Plymouth College.
- Terry Pratchett's Mort, adapted from the novel, music by Dominic Haslam, book by Jenifer Toksvig, directed by Clive Paget, choreography by Sam Spencer-Lane, musical direction by Mark Dougherty. Library Theatre, Manchester.
- Force 9½, a devised musical about a boy whose life, to his growing horror, is turning into a musical, music by Alexander Rudd, book and direction by John Nicholson, choreography by Luke Sheppard, movement by Emily Bruni, designed by Ellie Welch. Theatre Workshop, Edinburgh, as part of the Edinburgh Fringe Festival.
- Rare Dreams, a devised musical, music by Sonum Batra, devised and directed by Kath Burlinson, choreography by Nancy Spanier, design and additional material by Paul Oertel. Downside School and Downside Abbey, Somerset.
- Frankenstein, adapted from the novel by Mary Shelley, music by Jimmy Jewell, book and lyrics by Nick Stimson, choreography by Claire Russ, designed by Minna Gibbs-Nicholls, musical direction Jon Laird. Barbican Theatre, Plymouth.
- Oh! Carol, a new high school style musical featuring the songs of Neil Sedaka, book and lyrics by Syd Ralph and Mark Dougherty, choreography by Deborah Maguire, designed by Hannah Strange, musical direction by Mark Dougherty. Brian Friel Theatre within Queen's Film Theatre, Belfast.

=== 2006 ===
- The Stones are Hatching, adapted from the novel by Geraldine McCaughrean, music and musical direction by Alexander Rudd, book and lyrics by Jennifer Toksvig, directed by Toby Davies. Hethersett Old Hall School, Norwich.
- The Last Tango, based on the novel Ali and Nino, music composed by Milos Matic of the Boris Kovač LadaAba Orchestra, devised and directed by Peta Lily, designed by Nick Barnes. Library Theatre, Manchester.
- The Girl in the Ashes, a devised musical based on Cinderella themes, music by Annemarie Lewis Thomas, devised and directed by Gerry Flanagan, choreography by Sheena Kelly.
- Frankenstein, adapted from the novel by Mary Shelley, music by Jimmy Jewell, book and lyrics by Nick Stimson, choreography by Claire Russ. Drum Theatre, Theatre Royal, Plymouth.
- No Stone Unturned, a musical about the Stone of Scone and its theft in 1950, music and lyrics by Denise Wright, book by David Hudson, directed by Clive Paget. Fettes College Theatre, Edinburgh.
- Missing Melanie, a musical about the impact on a group of teenagers returning to school to find that their friend, Mel, has disappeared, music and lyrics by Conor Mitchell, book by Kath Burlinson, directed by Matt Peover, choreography by Lucy Cullingford, musical direction by Nik Haley. Greenwood Theatre, London.

=== 2005 ===
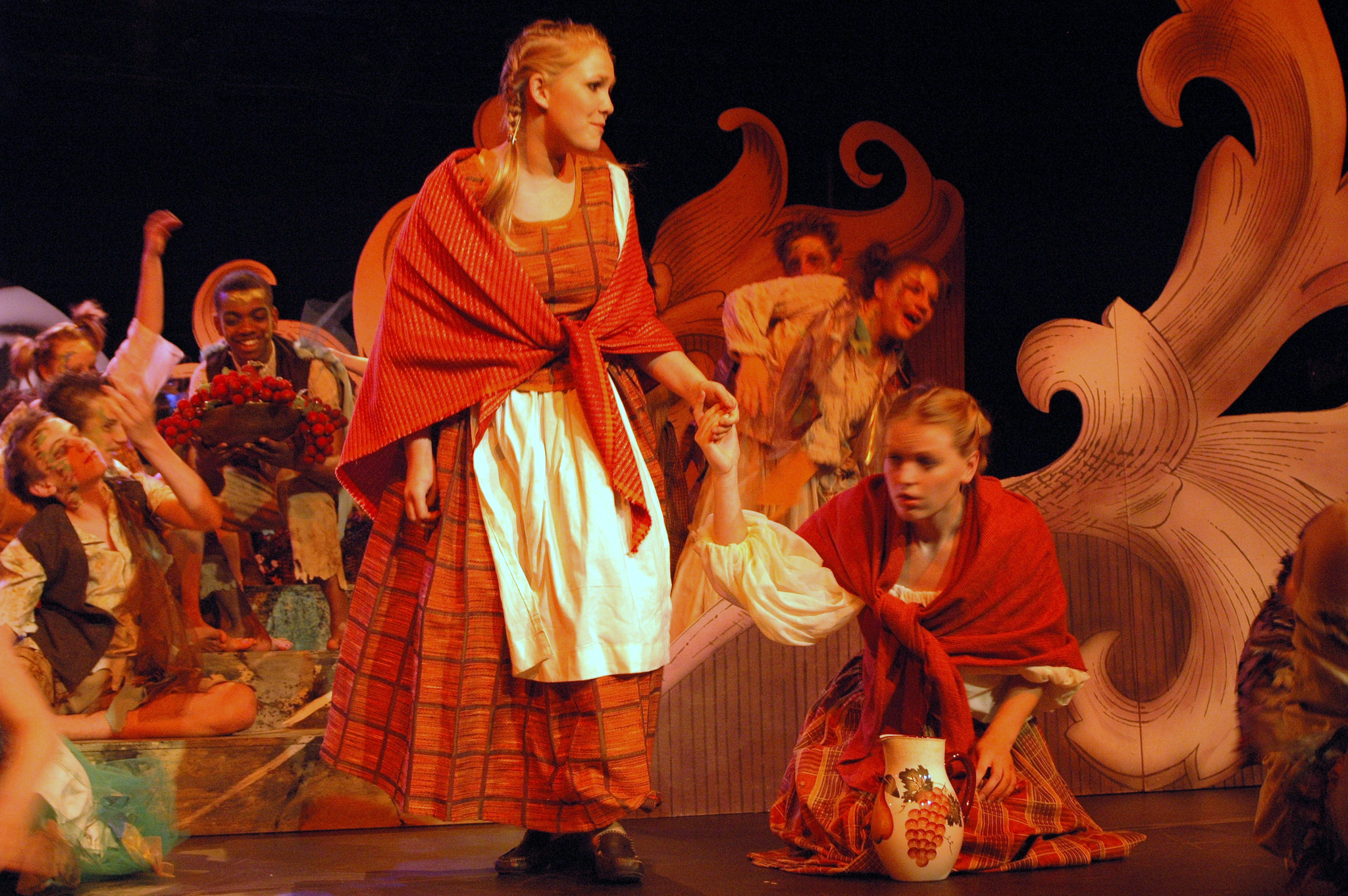
Goblin Market – George Square Theatre, Edinburgh Festival Fringe

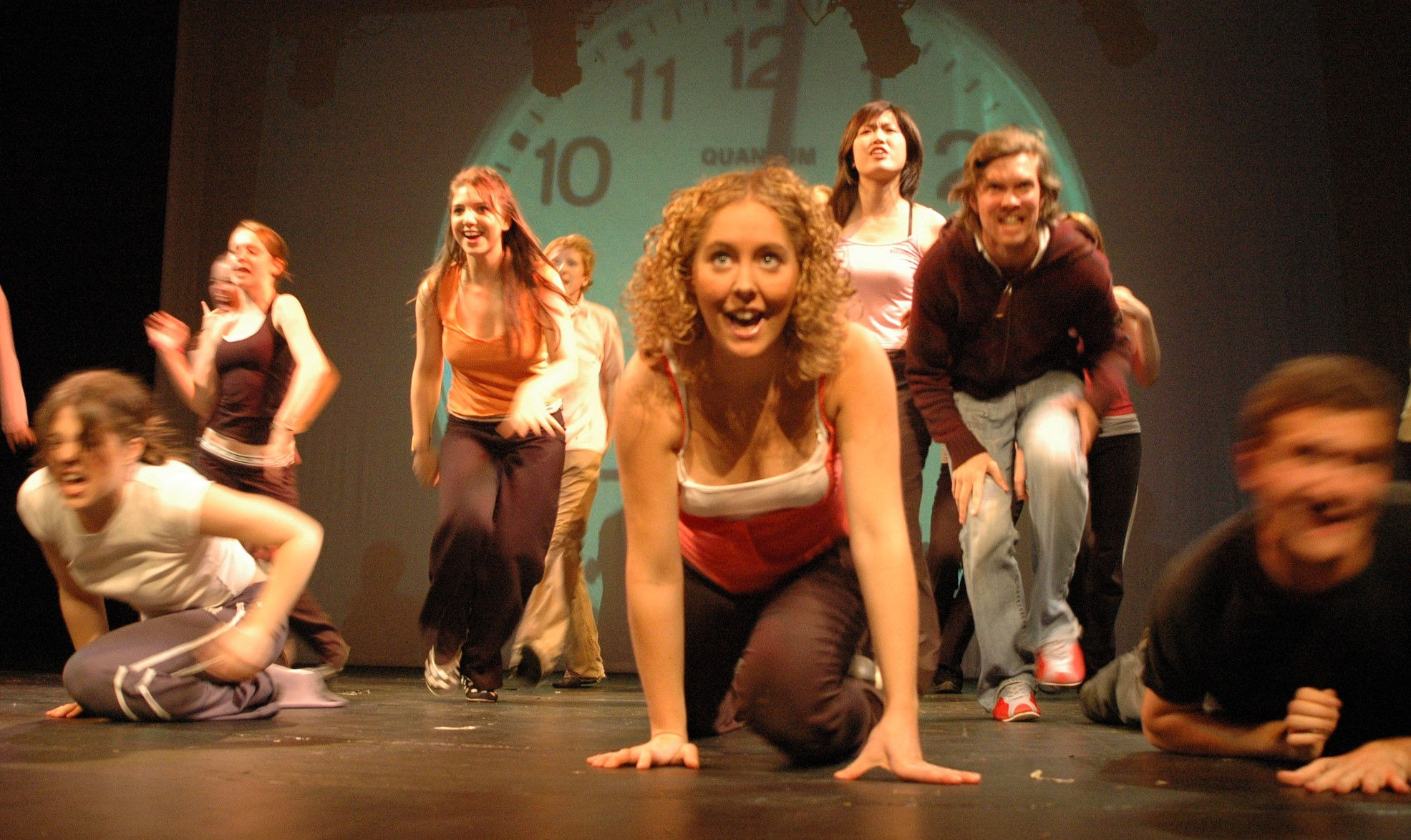
Please Look at Me Now – Loretto School Theatre, Musselburgh, Lothian

- Goblin Market, adapted from the poem of the same name by Christina Rossetti, music by Conor Mitchell, book, lyrics, direction and movement by Kath Burlinson, designed by Gary McCann. George Square Theatre as part of the Edinburgh Fringe Festival.
- The Stones are Hatching, adapted from the novel by Geraldine McCaughrean, music and musical direction by Alexander Rudd, book and lyrics by Jennifer Toksvig, directed by Toby Davies. Hethersett Old Hall School, Norwich.
- Monte Cristo, adapted from the novel The Count of Monte Cristo by Alexandre Dumas, music and musical direction by Leon Paris, book by Jon Smith, directed by Stephen Jameson, choreography by Fiona Rae. Patrick Centre, Birmingham Hippodrome.
- The Open Door, a devised musical, music by Annemarie Lewis Thomas, devised and directed by Gerry Flanagan, choreography by Yael Lowenstein. Queen's Film Theatre, Belfast.
- Please Look at Me Now, a musical about the loneliness of spectator culture and the seductive power of reality TV, music and lyrics by Jimmy Jewell, devised and directed by Peta Lily, choreography by Andy Howitt. Loretto School, Musselburgh.
- Red Hunter, a jazz musical about the McCarthyite trials in America in the 1950s inspired by the music of Miles Davis and John Coltrane, music and lyrics by Tim Sutton, book by Jane Brodie, directed by Vernon Mound, choreography by Claire Russ, musical direction by Tim Sutton. Chetham's School of Music, Manchester.
- Unforgotten, a musical about a Frenchman suffering from memory loss in the aftermath of the First World War, music by Chris Williams, book, lyrics and direction by Nick Stimson, choreography by Vik Sivalingam. Plymouth College.

=== 2004 ===
- Red Hunter, a jazz musical about the McCarthyite trials in America in the 1950s inspired by the music of Miles Davis and John Coltrane, music and lyrics by Tim Sutton, directed by Vernon Mound, choreography by Claire Russ, musical direction by Tim Sutton. Chetham's School of Music, Manchester.
- Amy's Wedding, a folklore inspired musical set in a New England rural community in the 18th century, music by Chris Tingley, book and direction by Syd Ralph, choreography by Tony Aiken. The Garage, Norwich.
- Over the Edge, a devised musical, improvised in front of a festival audience, music by Conor Mitchell, devised and facilitated by Kath Burlinson. The Great Hall, Queen's University Belfast as part of the Belfast Festival at Queen's.
- Quantum 1 – Queen of the Underground, music by Jimmy Jewell, book and direction by Nick Stimson, choreography by Kelly Oates. Plymouth College.
- Quantum 2, music by Miguel Mera, directed by Ed Woodall, choreography by Ayse Tashkiran. Patrick Centre, Birmingham Hippodrome.
- Quantum 3, music by Jane Gardner, directed by Jaki McCarrick, choreography by Vik Sivalingam. Methodist College, Belfast.
- Quantum 4 – Bob Dylan, music by Oliver Jackson, directed by Stephen Jameson, choreography by Kath Burlinson. Plymouth College.
