= Tony Macaulay (writer) =

Author and peace builder from Northern Ireland

Tony Macaulay (born 23 July 1963) is a Northern Ireland author, leadership consultant, peace builder and broadcaster.

== Background ==
Macaulay was born in Lisburn and grew up in the Upper Shankill area of West Belfast. He attended Belfast Royal Academy and in 1985 he graduated from the Ulster University. In 2019 he was awarded an honorary doctorate by Ulster University for services to literature and peace building at home and abroad.

In 2008 he published a discussion paper about Northern Ireland's peace walls. He runs a management consultancy specialising in “leadership, executive coaching, conflict resolution and social change". He is a regular contributor to Thought for the Day on BBC Radio Ulster.

His fourth memoir ‘Little House on the Peace Line’ (2017) tells the story of how he lived and worked on the peace line in North Belfast in the 1980s. His first novel ‘Belfast Gate’ (2019) is a satirical comedy set in 2019 about a group of Catholic and Protestant women who start a campaign to take down Belfast's 50 year old peace walls.

His first book, Paperboy, has been adapted for the stage as a musical commissioned by British Youth Music Theatre, by writer and stand-up comedian Andrew Doyle with music by platinum selling artist Duke Special and directed by Steven Dexter and Dean Johnson. The musical premiered in the Lyric Theatre in Belfast in 2018 and returned for a second run in 2019 . Subsequent memoirs, Breadboy and All Growed Up, have also been adapted for stage by BYMT's summer programme.

He is involved with a youth empowerment project in Uganda and the development of an international reconciliation centre in Rwanda

== Bibliography ==
=== Novels ===
- Belfast Gate (2019, so it is: ISBN 978-1-9161880-0-6)

=== Non-fiction ===
- Paperboy: An Enchanting True Story Of A Belfast Paperboy Coming To Terms With The Troubles (2011, HarperCollins: ISBN 978-0007449231)
- Breadboy: Teenage Kicks and Tatey Bread - What Paperboy Did Next (2013, Blackstaff Press: ISBN 978-0856409103)
- All Growed Up: What Breadboy Did at University (2014, Blackstaff Press: ISBN 978-0856409349)
- Little House on the Peace Line: Living and Working as a Pacifist on Belfast's Murder Mile (2017, Blackstaff Press: ISBN 978-0856409929)
