= Hethersett Old Hall School =

Location
- Hethersett; Norwich, Norfolk, NR9 3DW; England; 52.5923°N 1.1751°E

Information
- Type: Independent Day and Boarding School
- Religious affiliation: Christian
- Established: 1924
- Closed: 2019
- Department for Education URN: 121227 Tables
- Chairman of the governors: Martin Matthews
- Headmaster: Stephen Crump
- Age: 3 to 18
- Enrolment: 180 pupils

Hethersett Old Hall School was an independent school located in Hethersett, Norfolk, England that educated around 180 boys and girls. It was a day school for girls aged 3–18 and for boys aged 3–11 with boarding for girls from age 9.

== History ==
The school was opened, at Hellesdon House, in September 1924 by Mrs C. P. Andrews. In 1938, the school moved to the Old Hall in Hethersett, a building which dates back to the 17th and 18th centuries. A sixth form was established in September 1984. The school celebrated its 75th birthday in 2013.

On 14 August 2019 it was announced the school would not reopen after the summer break as it was unable to attract and retain enough pupils to make it financially viable.

== Academic standards ==
92% of pupils achieved five or more GCSE A* to Cs in the results announced in August 2012 and 31% of GCSE passes were at A* and A grades.

In 2012, HOHS celebrated its best A Level results in ten years, with 85% of passes at the top grades of A*-C and 100% pass rate.

The Independent Schools Inspectorate, reporting in April 2011, praised the school and said the personal development of pupils was "outstanding".
