= Greenwood Community Theatre =

Theatre in Greenwood, South Carolina, USA

Coordinates: 34°11′31″N 82°9′40″W

- Formation: 1954
- Type: Theatre group
- Purpose: Musical Theater, Drama, Theatre, Children's Theatre
- Location: 110 Main St., Greenwood, South Carolina
- Website: www.greenwoodcommunitytheatre.com

Greenwood Community Theatre, or GCT, is a non-profit theatre in Greenwood, South Carolina. Greenwood Community Theatre officially began in 1954.

GCT reopened in January 2007 after an extensive 1.2 million dollar renovation offering live theatre in the form of musicals, comedies, dramas, classic films, Indie films, music concerts, forum, debates and many rentals to local and touring organizations and businesses.

== History ==
Support for renovations came with the city’s decision in the early 2000s to anchor its downtown revival with historic properties.

After being closed for 18 months to remodel, the theatre re-opened in February 2007 for the production Anything Goes. Renovations preserved the original terrazzo tile floor in the lobby. Improvements included seating capacity for nearly 300, better access for wheelchairs, new riggings, curtains, the addition of a catwalk, and an upgraded sound and lighting system.

== Currently ==
GCT currently offers a 5-7 show season featuring local performers in shows ranging from classic musicals to contemporary straight plays, kids musicals and more. Most recent previous seasons at GCT have included: The Hallelujah Girls, Elf, The Boys Next Door, The Great Gatsby, Cinderella, Frozen Jr., The 25th Annual Putnam County Spelling Bee, Matilda Jr., Guys and Dolls, The Jungle Book KIDS, Little Shop of Horrors, and Junie B. Jones Jingle Bells Batman Smells.

=== Musicians and comedians that have appeared on GCT's stage ===
Edwin McCain, James Gregory, The Jake Bartley Band, The Swingin' Medallions, The Bad Weather States, Keith Jameson, Nat Chandler, Pam Stone, and many more.

==== GCT's 2025 season ====
Bright Star (February), Moana Jr. (April), Joseph and the Amazing Technicolor Dreamcoat (June), Hairspray (October-November), and The Best Christmas Pageant Ever (December).

Along with its own in-house productions, GCT also hosts The Greenwood Performing Arts (GPA) with their 5–6 show season of musical acts from around the world.

GCT also hosts several local events, including Cambridge Academy's Drama Program Musical, Make-A-Wish Concert, Emerald City Dance Explosion's Christmas Recital, Ashby Stokes Annual Christmas Concert, and many other comedy, concert or dance events.

In September 2017, GCT produced Annie Jr. as a 'Penguin Project' Production. The Penguin Project is a fully realized and produced show starring disabled kids and teenager 'artists' paired with a supporting 'mentor'. The following September, GCT produced its second Penguin Project Production, with Aladdin Jr. This September, GCT will produce 101 Dalmatians KIDS.

In May 2024, GCT collaborated with Greenwood High School to perform Newsies and Ryan Hewitt, GCT's artistic director, served as their director.

== Staff ==
- Stephen Gilbert, Executive Director
- Angela Scott, Box Office Manager
- Ryan Hewitt, Artistic and Technical Director

For the 6-show season, GCT employs different production members to help create the world of each show. Hewitt fills in specific roles for each production as choreographer, sometimes as director, costume, or prop designer.

Ryan Hewitt is also the resident Penguin Project coordinator and director.

== Facility ==
The theatre auditorium is a 300-seat proscenium-style house. The seating area is raked from back to front, allowing patrons a full view of the stage from any seat in house. The stage floor is raised above the audience floor. The facility upgrades from 2007 gave the theatre a digital sound console, wireless mics capabilities, an enclosed orchestra pit with a removable top, updated lighting inventory, and many more technological upgrades.

== Greenwood Children's Theatre ==
Greenwood Children's Theatre is a program offered by Greenwood Community Theatre that includes children's plays and musicals, workshops, and summer camps.

=== Summer Camps ===
GCT offers many summer camps every year. These summer camps last one week M-F, some full and some half-day.

This year, the summer camps will be Seussical KIDS, and Magic Tree House: Dinosaurs before Dark KIDS.

== Past Seasons ==
=== 2024 Season ===
- Tuck Everlasting (Drew Kenyon)
- The Lion King Jr. (Anna Lyle-Lethco)
- The Wizard of Oz (Ryan Hewitt) - Festival of Flowers
- Much Ado About Nothing (McKenna Sloan) - Shakespeare at the Market
- Winnie the Pooh KIDS (Ryan Hewitt) - Penguin Project
- Clue (Brad Christie)
- Rudolph the Red-Nosed Reindeer Jr. (McKenna Sloan)

=== 2023 Season ===
- The 25th Annual Putnam County Spelling Bee (Ryan Hewitt)
- Matilda Jr. (Anna Lyle-Lethco)
- Guys and Dolls (Dr. David Sollish) - Festival of Flowers
- Twelfth Night (Joey Plyler) - Shakespeare at the Market
- The Jungle Book KIDS (Ryan Hewitt) - Penguin Project
- Little Shop of Horrors (Myra Greene)
- Junie B Jones: Jingle Bells, Batman Smells (Ryan Hewitt)

=== 2022 Season ===
- The Great Gatsby (John Keenan)
- The Boys Next Door (Brad Christie)
- Cinderella (Ryan Hewitt) - Festival of Flowers
- The Taming of the Shrew (John Keenan) - Shakespeare at The Market
- The Aristocats KIDS (Ryan Hewitt) - Penguin Project
- Frozen Jr. (Kelly Crittendon)

=== 2021 Season ===
- A Midsummer Night's Dream (John Keenan) - Shakespeare at The Market
- The Hallelujah Girls (Micheal Genevie)
- Elf (Drew Kenyon)

=== 2020 Season ===
- The Marvelous Wonderettes (Wendi Wimmer)
- A Raisin in the Sun (Clark Nesbit)
- A Charlie Brown Christmas

=== 2019 Season ===
- Oklahoma! (John Keenan)
- My Son Pinocchio Jr. (Drew Kenyon)
- Seussical the Musical (Ryan Hewitt) - Festival of Flowers
- The Dixie Swim Club (Monique Sacay-Bagwell)
- The Addams Family (Ryan Hewitt)
- Madeline's Christmas (Tiffany Skelton)

=== 2018 Season ===
- 9 to 5 (Ryan Hewitt)
- Madagascar Jr. (Ryan Hewitt)
- Into the Woods - Festival of Flowers
- Aladdin Jr. (Ansley Bice-Keenan) - Penguin Project
- The Legend of Sleepy Hollow (Tracie Liquire-Rush)
- It's A Wonderful Life (Tracie Liquire-Rush)
- A Charlie Brown Christmas (Ryan Hewitt)

=== 2017 Season ===
- Sister Act (Tracie Liquire)
- Peter Pan Jr. (Ryan Hewitt)
- Beauty and the Beast (Tracie Liquire) - Festival of Flowers
- Annie Jr. (Ansley Bice-Keenan) - Penguin Project
- Driving Miss Daisy (Myra Greene)
- Miracle on 34th Street (Myra Greene)

=== 2016 Season ===
- To Kill A Mockingbird (Tracie Liquire)
- Godspell (Ryan Hewitt)
- James and the Giant Peach Jr. (Ansley Bice-Keenan)
- The Little Mermaid (Ryan Hewitt) - Festival of Flowers
- Annie Jr. (Tracie Liquire)
- Steel Magnolias (Myra Greene)
- Once An Angel (Ryan Hewitt)

=== 2015 Season ===
- Willy Wonka (Tracie Liquire)
- Mulan Jr. (Tracie Liquire)
- Shrek the Musical (Ryan Hewitt) - Festival of Flowers
- Mary Poppins (Micheal Genevie) - Collaboration with Abbeville Opera House
- The Best Christmas Pageant Ever (Tracie Liquire)

=== 2013-2014 Season ===
- Tom Sawyer (Ryan Hewitt)
- Grease (Myra Greene)
- Believe! (Ryan Hewitt)
- The Wizard of Oz (Tracie Liquire)
- Honk! Jr. (Ansley Bice-Keenan) - Kids4Kids
- Barefoot in the Park (Monique Sacay-Bagwell)
- The Sound of Music - Festival Of Flowers
- Footloose (Myra Greene)

=== 2012-2013 Season ===
- Legally Blonde
- Beauty and the Beast Jr. (Ryan Hewitt) - Kids4Kids
- Smoke on the Mountain (Bess Park)
- 'Twas the Night Before Christmas
- Twelfth Night
- The Music Man
- Winnie the Pooh KIDS - Kids4Kids
- Oliver! (Myra Greene) - Festival of Flowers

=== 2011-2012 Season ===
- The Fantasticks
- The Guys
- Morning's at Seven
- Aladdin Jr. - Kids4Kids
- A Christmas Story
- The Glass Menagerie
- My Fair Lady (Bess Park)
- The Aristocats KIDS - Kids4Kids
- You're a Good Man, Charlie Brown
- Twelfth Night
- Man of La Mancha (Tony Humrichouser) - Festival of Flowers

=== 2010-2011 Season ===
- Alice in Wonderland Jr.
- 101 Dalmatians Jr.
- A Christmas Carol
- Sylvia by A.R. Gurney
- Guys and Dolls (Bess Park)
- Annie Jr.
- Arsenic and Old Lace
- Ask Me Anything by local author Israel Allen
- Hairspray (Joey Giles) - Festival of Flowers

=== 2009-2010 Season ===
- Disney's High School Musical
- The Lion, the Witch, and the Wardrobe - Kids4Kids
- The Mousetrap
- The Best Christmas Pageant Ever
- Fiddler on the Roof
- Romeo and Juliet
- Dancin' Fools
- Seussical the Musical - Festival of Flowers

=== 2008-2009 Season ===
- Catfish Moon
- Tales of a Fourth Grade Nothing
- Rip Van Winkle and The Legend of Sleepy Hollow
- The Best Christmas Pageant Ever
- A Few Good Men
- Brigadoon
- The Misanthrope
- Godspell, Jr.
- Steel Magnolias
- Children of Eden

=== 2007-2008 Season ===
- Smoke on the Mountain Homecoming
- Treasure Island
- Merry Christmas Scrooge
- Oklahoma!
- 12 Angry Men
- A Midsummer Night's Dream
- Little Shop of Horrors

=== 2007 Season ===
- Anything Goes Homecoming
- Women on Fire
- Wind in the Willows
- The Nerd
- The Secret Garden - Festival of Flowers (Bess Park and Jeremy Webb)
