= Steve Rushton =

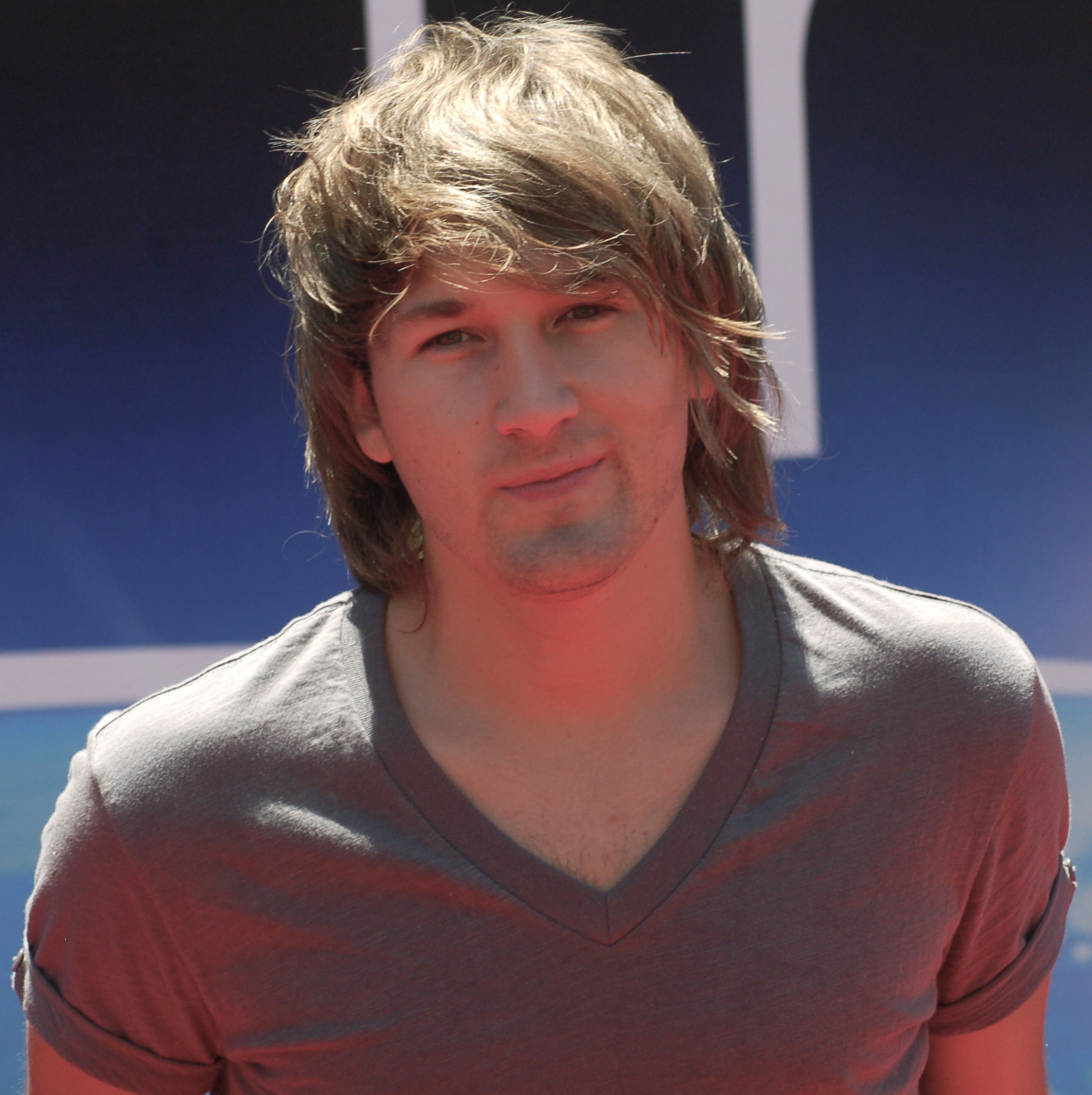
- Rushton in April 2009

Background information
- Born: Steven John Rushton; 30 October 1987 (age 38); Chertsey, Surrey, England
- Genres: Pop, pop-punk
- Occupations: Musician, songwriter, producer
- Instruments: Vocals, guitar, bass guitar drums
- Years active: 2003–present
- Label: Hollywood Records
- Formerly of: Son of Dork
- Website: www.rushtonmusic.com

Steven John Rushton (born 30 October 1987) is a British musician and former co-lead singer and bassist for the pop punk band Son of Dork. Rushton contributed two songs to the number 1 box office and Billboard movie/soundtrack album, Hannah Montana: The Movie: "Game Over" and "Everything I Want". The soundtrack has sold 4,000,000+ copies worldwide.

== Early life and career ==
Rushton was born in Frimley Park Hospital in Surrey, and was introduced to music by his stepfather, an Elvis impersonator, when he used to bring Rushton up on stage with him to perform.

=== Mr. Cheerful (2003–2004) ===
From early school years and up to college, Rushton was the writer, guitarist and singer for the band Mr. Cheerful. The band was heavily influenced by artists such as Elvis Presley and Green Day. Their biggest brush with fame was their participation in the UK final for the 2003 Junior Eurovision Song Contest. Rushton was unable to continue with Mr. Cheerful when he was scouted for Son of Dork.

=== Son of Dork (2005–2007) ===
Rushton took part in the auditions for James Bourne's new band, after Bourne's previous band split in 2005. Originally entering to be a guitarist, he was asked to be the co-lead singer/bassist, an offer he initially refused. Their first single "Ticket Outta Loserville" charted at number 3 in the charts, whilst the band were met with mixed reviews. Shortly after releasing the album Welcome to Loserville; they released another single "Eddie's Song" which charted at number 10. They were also featured on the soundtrack to Alien Autopsy. The band headed out on two major tours; The Get Happy Tour and The Sic Tour, one of which they headlined.

=== Solo career & other musical ventures (2008–present) ===
After leaving Son of Dork, Rushton embarked on a solo career and was quickly signed on by record group Hollywood Records. His first major boost of his career was with Disney Channel's original series The Suite Life on Deck to which he sang the opening theme, "Livin' the Suite Life". Shortly after, he released his first single "Emergency" which was included in the soundtrack for the Disney movie Race to Witch Mountain. As his popularity grew, he got a place in the soundtrack of Hannah Montana: The Movie as well as a cameo role playing himself performing his two songs he wrote and performed for the movie, and performing with Hannah Montana. His next single "Ready to Rock" was released to coincide with Disney film G-Force. Shortly after the release of his second single, Rushton went on tour at Disneyland singing old and new songs, including a cover of the Lady Gaga song "Poker Face". He also sang "Santa Claus Is Coming to Town" on the soundtrack for the Christmas film Santa Buddies (2009). He contributed to the Wizards of Waverly Place soundtrack, which features songs inspired by the TV hit. Rushton co-wrote the song "Heart and Soul" from the Camp Rock 2: The Final Jam soundtrack.

In 2016, Rushton was cast as Will in the Green Day musical American Idiot, making his West End debut.

From 2019 Steve has performed as Steve/Bass in Mamma Mia! The Party at the O2 in Greenwich, London.

== Personal life ==
Rushton is a fan of the American rock band Green Day, and has stated that Billie Joe Armstrong was one of the key musicians who inspired him to pursue a music career.

== Discography ==
=== Singles ===
Year	Single	Album
2009	"Emergency"	Soundtrack to Race to Witch Mountain.
2009	"Ready to Rock"	Soundtrack to G-Force.
