= Coming Home (Busted song) =

Song by Busted

from the album Night Driver
- Released: 3 May 2016
- Genre: Synthpop; pop rock; electronic
- Length: 3:16
- Label: East West
- Songwriter(s): James Bourne; Charlie Simpson; Matt Willis
- Producer(s): John Fields

"Coming Home" is a song by English pop rock band Busted from their third studio album, Night Driver (2016). It was released as a promotional single. It was written by the band and produced by John Fields. It was given much promotion by the band on their Twitter accounts, first tweeting the date of release with the caption '------ ----', to raise excitement and allow for fans to guess the title. The song (as well as a Music video, directed by David Spearing) was released on 3 May 2016 as a free download, being Busted's first new material in over ten years.

The song was written for the fans of the band that have supported them from the beginning of their careers. A statement on the band's website stated:

Hey guys, we wrote Coming Home just for you - the fans who have been with us since the beginning! Thanks for all your support, we can't wait to see you on the Pigs Can Fly tour

== Charts ==
Chart (2016)	Peak position
Scotland (OCC)	46
