= Night Driver =

Night Driver, Night Drivers, or, variation, may refer to:

== Music ==
- Night Driver Tour 2017, a 2017 album concert tour by Busted
- The Night Drivers, a band formed by Chris Jones

=== Albums ===
- Night Driver (album), a 2016 album by Busted
- Night//Driver, a 2006 song by Steinar Raknes and Erik Nylander and the Ola Kvernberg Trio

=== Songs ===
- "Night Driver", a 2016 song by Busted from the eponymous album Night Driver
- "Night Driver", a 2015 song by Blind Idiot God from the album Before Ever After
- "Night Driver", a 2009 song by Andrew W.K. from the album 55 Cadillac
- "Night Driver", a 2006 song by Tom Petty from the album Highway Companion

== Other uses ==
- Night Driver (video game), a 1976 arcade game
- The Night Driver, an Australian crime podcast; see List of Australian crime podcasts
- "Night Drivers", an episode of Amphibia

== See also ==
- Night (disambiguation)
- Driver (disambiguation)
- Night Drive (disambiguation)
