= On What You're On =

Single by Busted

from the album Night Driver
- Released: 30 September 2016
- Genre: Disco
- Length: 3:09
- Label: London
- Songwriters: James Bourne, Charlie Simpson, Matt Willis, Lauren Christy, John Fields
- Producers: John Fields, Alex Metric

Busted singles chronology
"She Wants to Be Me" (2004)	"On What You're On" (2016)	"Thinking of You" (2016)

Music video
- "On What You're On" on YouTube

"On What You're On" is the lead single by English pop rock band Busted from their third studio album, Night Driver (2016). It was written by the band and John Fields, and produced by Fields and co-produced by Alex Metric.

The single was first announced on 19 September when a short teaser trailer for the song was uploaded to the band's Twitter account. Similar short videos were used to generate hype in the lead up to the release of the single at midnight on 30 September (on iTunes and Spotify).

The song made its radio debut on the day of its release when the band was interviewed by Scott Mills during his show on BBC Radio 1. The music video was released the same day.

Musically, the song has been compared to Daft Punk and The 1975.

== Charts ==
Chart (2016)	Peak position
Scottish Singles Sales (Official Charts)	26
UK Singles (Official Charts)	60
UK Singles Downloads (Official Charts)	24
