= Busted (band) =

English pop-punk band

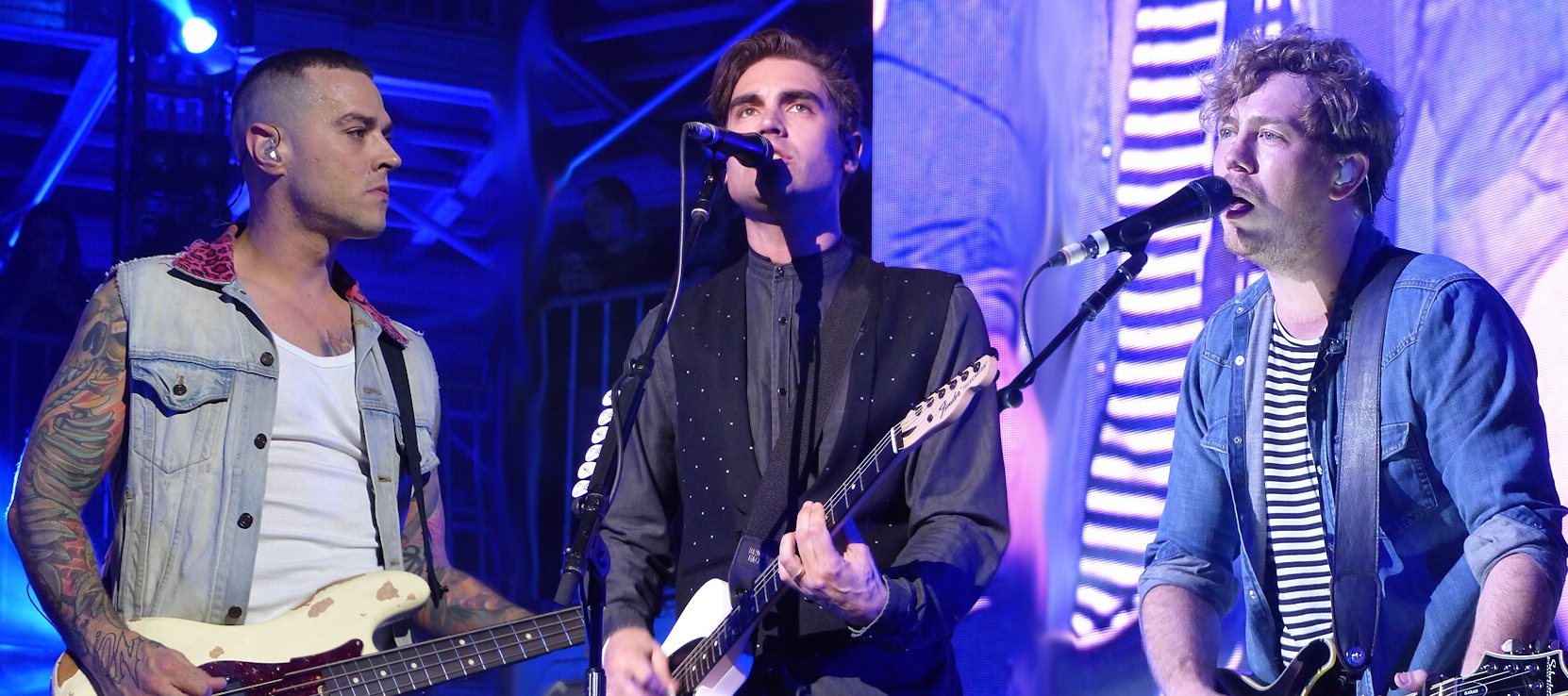
- Collage of Busted performing in 2016 (from left to right): Willis, Simpson, Bourne

Background information
- Origin: Southend-on-Sea, Essex, England
- Genres: Pop-punk; pop rock; pop; synth-pop
- Years active: 2000–2005; 2015–present
- Labels: Island; Sony; Warner; East West
- Spinoffs: McBusted; Fightstar; Son of Dork
- Members: James Bourne; Matt Willis; Charlie Simpson
- Past members: Owen Doyle; Ki Fitzgerald; Tom Fletcher
- Website: busted.komi.io

Busted are an English pop-punk band from Southend-on-Sea, Essex, consisting of James Bourne, Matt Willis and Charlie Simpson. Formed in 2000, the band has had four UK number-one singles, won two Brit Awards, released four studio albums and sold over 5 million records worldwide. The band released the albums Busted in 2002 and A Present for Everyone in 2003 before disbanding in January 2005.

Following the split, all three members pursued separate musical careers: Simpson as the frontman for the post-hardcore band Fightstar, Bourne as the lead singer of pop-punk band Son of Dork and Willis as a solo artist. The band reunited in 2015, embarking on the Pigs Can Fly arena tour in May 2016 and releasing their third studio album, Night Driver, on 25 November 2016. On 26 October 2018, Busted announced their fourth album, Half Way There, released on 1 February 2019, as well as a UK arena tour. At the end of 2019, the band embarked on a hiatus to pursue solo projects. In 2023, Busted announced their return for their 20th anniversary, consisting of a greatest hits album, Greatest Hits 2.0, and arena tour.

According to the British Phonographic Industry (BPI), Busted has been certified for sales of 2.4 million albums and 3.6 million singles in the UK.

== History ==
=== 2000–2002: Formation, Busted and rise to fame ===
James Bourne and Matt Willis originally auditioned for other bands which neither of them made it into. They remained friends for a number of years and wrote material together, which Willis claimed was inspired by BBMak, Blink-182 and the American Pie 2 soundtrack. Initially known as The Termites, Busted were formed in 2000 after open auditions were held by Prestige Artist Management to form a new band. The line-up consisted of Bourne, Willis, Ki Fitzgerald and Owen Doyle, although this version of the band broke up in October 2001.

Looking to find a new band member, Willis and Bourne placed an ad in NME magazine, titled "Guitarist and singer wanted for pop band…". Auditions were held at Pineapple Studios in Covent Garden in October 2001. Charlie Simpson and Tom Fletcher were both offered a place to complete the line-up, but Busted's manager told Fletcher via a phone call a few days later that the band was to go ahead as a trio, comprising Bourne, Willis and Simpson.

The band was launched in August 2002, making their first appearance on the cover of Smash Hits with the headline: "Meet Busted: They're Going to Be Bigger than Rik Waller!", making it a first for any pop band to appear on the magazine's cover before releasing a single. Their debut single, "What I Go to School For", inspired by a teacher that Willis had a crush on at school, was finally released in September 2002. It reached number three on the UK Singles Chart and was later performed in a girls school after the students won a BRMB competition. Their debut album, Busted, was then released, initially charting only around the UK Top 30 and receiving mixed reviews from critics however, it went on to peak at number 2. The follow-up "Year 3000", which was written about Bourne's obsession with the film Back to the Future, then followed in January 2003, reaching number two in the UK chart. In April, their third single, "You Said No" became their first number one. British Hit Singles & Albums certified them as the first act ever to have their debut three singles enter the top three in an ascending order.

Recording began for their second album while the debut album was re-released with new tracks and an enhanced CD section. It would go on to sell 1.2 million copies by the end of the year. The debut album's final single, "Sleeping with the Light On", reached number 3 in August 2003, beaten to number one by Blu Cantrell's "Breathe".

=== 2003–2005: A Present for Everyone and split ===
Busted started the summer of 2003 with a win for Favourite Newcomer at the National Music Awards, as well as Best Band at that year's Disney Channel Kids' Awards. After this, the band launched the promotional trail for their new album, A Present for Everyone, and its lead single, "Crashed the Wedding", which reached number one in the UK chart. Edgier than their previous album, Simpson said that it had some "harder, Good Charlotte type vibes coming through on this album". This album would also go on to reach sales of over 1 million copies.

During 2003, Charlie met fellow songwriter-guitarist Alex Westaway and drummer Omar Abidi at a party. He was by this stage becoming increasingly frustrated by the music he was performing in Busted and stated he had "all of this creativity pent up inside and I just needed to vent it somewhere, and I was writing a lot of songs but I couldn't play them, because I didn't have anyone to play them with". During the aforementioned party, an impromptu jam session took place. Simpson, Westaway, and Abidi played Rage Against the Machine's song "Killing in the Name" on loop, and agreed to attend a gig a few days later. After the show, they went back to Simpson's flat and began performing on guitars and a v-drum kit, which led to their first song being written, titled "Too Much Punch". Westaway later invited bassist Dan Haigh to practice with the band and soon began booking regular rehearsal sessions together, under the name Fightstar.

2004 was to prove their final year together as a band. The band performed a successful arena tour to start the year before reaching number one and number two with "Who's David" and "Air Hostess", respectively. They picked up Best British Breakthrough Act and Best Pop Act at that year's BRIT Awards. The boys then headed over to the U.S. to release a self-titled album that was a mixture of their first and second albums. Their exploits were captured for the TV series America or Busted, about Busted's attempts to achieve success in the United States, which ultimately failed. The show debuted on MTV UK in November of that year, over the course of the series, it saw Busted's attempts to 'break' America dwindle as interviews fell through and performances remained limited both in terms of audience size and press attention.

Whilst the band were out in America, they were then invited to record the theme tune to the brand new Thunderbirds film that was coming out that summer. Released as a double A-side with the album track, "3AM", it gave them their fourth and final number one in August 2004, staying at the top for two weeks, the longest they had ever spent at the top. However, the release of the fifth single from their second album, "She Wants to Be Me", failed to chart due to its lone formats being a download and a limited edition pocket sized CD, both of which breached chart regulations at the time. Their live album, A Ticket for Everyone, was released in November peaked at number eleven. The band embarked on another sell-out tour that November, and Busted gained a record of the band to play the most consecutive sellout dates at Wembley Arena, eleven nights. At the end of 2004, Busted were involved in the UK number-one Christmas single, Band Aid 20's "Do They Know It's Christmas?" with money raised helping to combat HIV and AIDS across Africa, famine relief in the Darfur region of Sudan and aid relief in many countries, such as Ethiopia.

Simpson's time spent with Fightstar reportedly began to cause tensions within the band, amplified when Fightstar announced a 14-date UK tour. Simpson announced to Busted's manager on 24 December 2004 over a phone call that he was leaving the band to focus on Fightstar full-time. On 13 January 2005, Busted's record label announced that a press conference was to be held at the Soho Hotel in London the following day. The next day, the 14th, it was then announced that Busted were splitting up after Simpson's departure weeks before.

In an interview with Kerrang! in November 2009, Simpson said, "It was a real fun thing to be doing, and I got on well with everyone I was doing it with, but on the other side, the music wasn't really fulfilling me. I have good memories of the time because we were traveling the world and doing some amazing things, but then as far as self-fulfillment goes, it wasn't really doing a lot for me, so I have these mixed views when I look back. But there's no doubt that it was an amazing thing to do".

=== 2006–2012: Solo projects and bands ===
Simpson began pursuing a solo career after playing in Fightstar, a post-hardcore band which differs greatly from the sound of Busted. They formed a year prior to Busted's split. To-date they have released one EP and four albums: They Liked You Better When You Were Dead, Grand Unification, One Day Son, This Will All Be Yours, Be Human and Behind the Devil's Back, all being released in both the UK and the US. They have also released an album of b-sides and rarities, "Alternate Endings". Fightstar announced a hiatus at the beginning of 2010, stating that they were "taking some time off" to work on separate projects before regrouping to begin working a new record. After their 2014 reunion and 2015 album, Fightstar began to describe themselves as a "passion project" rather than a full-time band, as the members focus on other projects. Simpson released a solo acoustic album called Young Pilgrim, which peaked at number 6 in the UK Albums Chart in 2011, followed by the 2014 album Long Road Home.

Bourne went on to release music through pop punk band Son of Dork, and pursued a solo career under the name of Future Boy. He has also written songs for many artists including Melanie C, McFly, JC Chasez, Pat Monahan of Train, and the Jonas Brothers. From 2007 to 2008, he was one of the main songwriters for the ITV musical drama, Britannia High.

After a brief stint in rehab after the Busted split, Willis began a solo career, releasing singles in 2006 and 2007, "Up All Night", "Hey Kid", "Don't Let It Go to Waste", and "Crash" for the film Mr Bean's Holiday, all except the latter of which were included on his album Don't Let It Go to Waste. Willis also appeared on, and was the winner of, the 2006 series of I'm a Celebrity...Get Me Out of Here!. After being dropped from his record label, Willis turned to presenting. He presented at the Brit Awards and ITV2's I'm a Celebrity...Get Me Out of Here! NOW! alongside his wife, Emma, the pair worked together on E!, presenting the BAFTAs. On Willis' Myspace, he has stated that he is currently writing with his new band, yet to be named.

=== 2013–2015: McBusted ===
From 19 to 22 September 2013, Willis and Bourne made a surprise brief reunion as McBusted when they joined McFly as special guests during the band's four 10th anniversary concerts at the Royal Albert Hall. They performed "Year 3000", "Air Hostess" and McFly's "Shine a Light" with McFly under the name 'McBusted'. McFly and Busted confirmed a 2014 tour together. Simpson said through Twitter that although he would not be joining the new supergroup, he wished them the best of luck in the future. McBusted released their debut album, McBusted, on 1 December 2014. They then embarked on another sold out UK tour, McBusted's Most Excellent Adventure Tour.

Willis also revealed that Busted had been approached to star in the ITV2 series The Big Reunion, but turned it down because "it didn't feel right for our band."

=== 2015–2016: Simpson's return, comeback tour and Night Driver ===
On 5 October 2015, The Sun rumoured that Simpson was set to rejoin Busted. After this, a photo made its way around the internet that showed the three members of Busted silhouetted in front of a red background. Words appeared to be blurred out at the bottom of the image, but above that was the words "Join us for a special announcement Tuesday November 10th 2015". This implied that the band was reuniting, with further speculation that the three would embark on a reunion tour together. On 10 November 2015, Busted announced a thirteen-date arena tour in the UK and Ireland would take place in May 2016. At the same press conference Busted announced their third studio album. 100,000 tickets were sold in the first hour of being put on sale. Subsequent tour dates were added as a result of high demand.

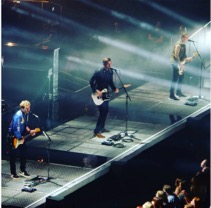
Busted performing at The SSE Hydro in Glasgow, Scotland during the Pigs Can Fly Tour, May 2016

Regarding his decision to rejoin the band, Simpson told Newsbeat: "I reckon I said it [so many times], privately and publicly, and I meant it every single time. But as I say I have changed my mind and that has been down to the circumstances changing. I never thought we would get to a point where we were in a studio writing music we all got behind creatively and that was a huge shock to me".

In early 2016, Busted recorded their third studio album in Los Angeles. On 17 March 2016, Bourne told a fan on Twitter that Busted would decide the release date for their third album that day. It is scheduled for release in the Autumn. The band have also insisted that their reunion is for the long-term; as Bourne told Digital Spy, "We want this to be something that is ongoing. Anything we write now goes towards album four". On 4 April 2016, Busted announced that their tour would be called the Pigs Can Fly Tour 2016 and would include Wheatus and Emma Blackery as special guests. Regarding the title, Willis told Newsbeat, "The whole pigs can fly thing sums up how we feel about this. There have been times that we thought Busted could never, ever possibly happen and we were quite right in thinking that. But this summarises that anything is possible". In an interview with Digital Spy, the band revealed that their fans will get a taste of their new sound before their reunion tour and that their eleventh single will be released in the summer, and their album would follow in the autumn.

On 25 April 2016, it was officially announced that South African drummer Cobus Potgieter, popular on YouTube would be the supporting drummer for the band during the tour. On 3 May, Busted released "Coming Home", their first new song for 12 years, as a free download from their website. During the 'Pigs Can Fly' tour, Busted premiered two new tracks titled "Easy" and "One of a Kind", from the upcoming 2016 album. Chalmers, president of East West, said: "Watching Busted play live over the past few weeks and seeing people respond to their music and energy has been amazing. Busted have a huge global fanbase who are going to be really excited to hear the new music the guys are working on. They've managed to combine the classic Busted sound with a modern twist, it's sure to remind people of why they love them. We're really happy to be working with Charlie, Matt and James". On 14 July 2016, Busted revealed that the "final touches" to the album were complete.

On 18 August 2016, it was announced by BBC News that a musical based on the band's history written by Bourne and Elliot Davis was to be staged, What I Go to School For will depict the group's rise to fame. It will be performed at the Theatre Royal Brighton in August 2016 and will feature songs like Air Hostess, Crashed the Wedding and Year 3000. If the show is a success Bourne and Davis have said they would like to take it to the West End. On 9 September 2016, Busted revealed that their third album would be called Night Driver.

On 3 May 2016, "Coming Home" was released as a promotional single from the album. On 30 September 2016, "On What You're On" was released as the first official single from the album. Another song, entitled "Easy", was unveiled on 18 October 2016. Two days later, on 20 October 2016, Busted announced that due to production delays, the album release would be pushed back to 25 November 2016. The same day, Busted released a video for "Easy" filmed live at Pool Studios. On 23 October 2016, the band made their first TV performance in over 12 years on The X Factor to perform "Year 3000" with the contestants.

=== 2017–2022: Half Way There and hiatus ===
In June 2017 Busted flew to Los Angeles to perform their first American re-formed gig at the Troubadour and continue writing and begin recording for their planned fourth album. In April 2018, it was confirmed the album would release in early 2019, and the band would return to their original sound. In May that year, Cobus Potgieter, who had previously stood in as drummer on Busted's 2016 tour, announced that he would be the studio drummer for the upcoming fourth album.

On 26 October 2018, Busted announced that their fourth album, Half Way There (a reference to a lyric in the song "Year 3000"), would be released on 8 February 2019. The album features a cover of James Bourne's song, "What Happened to Your Band", which was previously performed by his band Son of Dork and recorded by McBusted, and returns to the roots of their musical style. The first single of the album, "Nineties", was released in the first week of November 2018. Additional songs from the album, "Reunion" and "All My Friends", were released 14 and 15 December respectively (the latter was an exclusive release for those that had pre-ordered the album from the band's online store). In January 2019, Busted released their second single for the album, "Radio". This was accompanied by a music video.

The band performed a secret set at Slam Dunk Festival in May 2019, on the Key Club Stage (Right). The band performed under the pseudonym "Y3K", a reference to their song Year 3000. On 8 June 2019, Busted were invited on stage to perform "Year 3000" with the Jonas Brothers at Capital's Summertime Ball 2019 as special guests.

On 31 December 2019, Bourne announced a new solo project, tweeting "After twenty amazing years making music, I am stepping into 2020 on a brand new solo adventure. Busted will always be my band. But, I've dreamed for years about releasing my own album so here we go." His debut album, Safe Journey Home, was released on 23 October 2020. The album was followed-up with Sugar Beach, released in 2022. Simpson released a solo single called "I See You". His fourth solo album, Hope Is a Drug, was released in 2022. Alongside this, Simpson also set up a Patreon where he uploads exclusive tracks including new music and covers. During the hiatus, Willis continued his acting career, appearing in stage productions including Waitress and 2:22 A Ghost Story.

=== 2023–present: 20th Anniversary Tour and collaborations ===
On 21 March 2023, the band posted a teaser on their social media platforms for an announcement to be unveiled on 23 March, putting an end to their hiatus. That morning, they announced the 20th Anniversary & Greatest Hits Tour, a 15-date UK tour for September 2023. A single was also announced alongside the tour announcement: "Loser Kid 2.0," a re-recording of a song from their debut album featuring Simple Plan, set to release 14 April. An album of other re-recorded Busted classics featuring other artists, including McFly, All Time Low and Welsh pop-punk band Neck Deep, is set to be released as well. After selling out the initial 15-date tour, the band announced 11 additional dates in the UK and Ireland to meet demand, extending the tour until 10 October, with Hanson being the opening act of some of the dates, including the London O2 concerts.

On 14 April 2023, Busted released a version of "Loser Kid", the closing track of their 2002 self-titled debut album, titled "Loser Kid 2.0" featuring Canadian band Simple Plan. This version peaked at number 13 on the UK Singles Sales Chart. On 5 May 2023, Busted released "Meet You There 2.0", a pop-punk version of their 2003 album track, featuring Neck Deep. On 26 May 2023, Busted released a cover version of the 1997 Hanson hit "MMMBop", in collaboration with the latter band, titled "MMMBop 2.0". On 23 June 2023, Busted released a version of their 2003 hit "Crashed the Wedding", titled "Crashed the Wedding 2.0," featuring American band All Time Low. On 28 July 2023, a version of their 2002 hit "Year 3000" titled "Year 3000 2.0" came out featuring the Jonas Brothers on guest vocals. Greatest Hits 2.0, a collaborative album of re-recordings of songs from Busted's first two albums, was made available for pre-order on 28 July 2023. The album reached number 1 in the UK album charts on 22 September 2023. In January 2024, it was announced Busted would be participating in Download Festival. In July 2024, Busted announced their first-ever tour of Australia, with shows in Sydney, Brisbane and Melbourne in October and November 2024.

Busted and McFly announced the "Busted vs McFly" arena tour on 9 October 2024, marking the first time that all seven members would perform together since 2003. Due to health reasons, Bourne did not participate, with his younger brother Chris filling in on guitar.

== Artistry ==
=== Musical style ===
Busted's genre has been described as pop rock, pop-punk and college rock. Although the band were often referred to as a boy band, Simpson, Bourne and Willis would often reject that label. Simpson said, 'Those clichés are everything the band wasn't, because we hated them. We hated the machine of pop, we split up at the height of our fame, they were talking about us putting on a Wembley Stadium gig and we gave it up.' The sound of their first two albums were often compared to that of Wheatus, Blink-182 and Sum 41 and the band were complimented on the energy and enthusiasm brought to the studio and shows. When Busted returned to the pop punk sounds for Half Way There, Simpson noted that it was a style they tried to have when they were younger but the 'record label wouldn't allow it'. Busted's attempts to mature their sound was noted by Simpson in a BBC Interview. He stated 'I would go to the label and say, 'You've got to turn the drums up, you can't hear them and it doesn't sound like a rock record, it sounds like a pop record'.

Their third album, Night Driver, was a departure from their original sound. NME noted upon the release of "Coming Home", that the band were much more 'synth-pop' influenced. Influence from the 1980s decade and Daft Punk were also noted. The group also branched out into R&B and bass-heavy alternative pop.

Lyrically, Busted often references pop culture. Bourne stated 'The pop culture references are a big part of what we do. On those early records, we’ve got Britney Spears and Dawson's Creek in there, now we’re writing about Elon Musk. That's what's in our lives now'. Their song Year 3000 is also heavily influenced by Back to the Future. The band also described their style as 'tongue in cheek', stating that if you do that to 'banging rock music' and that 'When you do that, you can be silly, it really works'.

=== Influences ===
Busted have spoken about various influences for their sound and songwriting including Robbie Williams, Green Day, Michael Jackson and Blink-182. Simpson said that the latter in particular was a "big influence back in the day". Bourne also stated that Third Eye Blind was a "major influence" to the early days of the band. Upon announcing that Wheatus would be joining McBusted on tour in 2014, Willis said that the band was a "massive Busted influence".

== Legacy ==
At the height of their popularity, Busted were often complimented for bringing in a wave of British pop rock. They were referenced as bringing '"something fresh and new" to the scene' of pop. They 'broke with that trend of the all-singing, all-dancing boy group that was around', instead pioneering a revival in interest of the guitar. Kerrang! cited Busted as a positive influence on kids getting into rock. Simpson also spoke in 2019 about being told of an increase in guitar sales during Busted's heyday. Willis also mentioned that many upcoming indie bands and fans had spoken to him, stating that: "I meet them and they’ll say, ‘The first song I learned to play was What I Go to School For, and, ‘the first time I picked up a guitar was playing Busted tab’. That was amazing to me because I did that with Oasis chord books. It was so cool to hear people did that with our band." Their first two albums went Multi-Platinum and they achieved four number ones in the UK Charts. In 2004, Busted won Best British Breakthrough BRIT Award. The band's reunion tour in 2016 required extra dates after selling out within an hour.

Busted have been cited as influences for The Vamps and 5 Seconds of Summer. They have also been cited as one of the reasons musician Emma Blackery 'picked up a guitar'. Blackery went on to tour with the band during the Pigs Can Fly Tour in 2016. Pop rock band Natives have been vocally thankful to Busted, and particularly Matt Willis for 'fighting their corner'.

Busted have been called instrumental in the formation of British pop rock band McFly. After the record label declined Tom Fletcher's participation in the band, he was offered a space on the song writing team for the first two albums. Fletcher credits James Bourne as teaching him the structure of a pop hit. After Busted's split, McFly were often referred to as Busted's successor. "Year 3000" and "What I Go to School For" were also covered by the pop band Jonas Brothers. Their cover of "Year 3000" was a lead single from their first album and a commercial success.

Busted were mentioned directly by singer-songwriter Lewis Capaldi as being an influence to his artistry.

== Members ==
Current

- James Bourne – vocals, guitars, keyboards, piano, synths (2000–2005, 2015–present)
- Matt Willis – vocals, bass, drums (2000–2005, 2015–present)
- Charlie Simpson – vocals, lead guitar, drums, keyboards, synths (2001–2005, 2015–present)

Current touring musicians

- Eddy Thrower – drums (2019–present)
- Chris Bourne – rhythm guitar (2025–present)

Former

- Owen Doyle – vocals, bass (2000–2001)
- Ki Fitzgerald – vocals, rhythm guitar (2000–2001)
- Tom Fletcher – vocals, rhythm guitar (2001)

Former touring musicians

- Damon Wilson – drums (2003–2004)
- Chris Banks – keyboards (2003–2004)
- Chris Leonard – guitars (2003–2004)
- Nick Tsang – guitars (2016–2017)
- Ross Harris – drums (2016–2018)
- Cobus Potgieter – drums (2016)
- Jesse Molloy – saxophone (2017)
- David Temple – saxophone (2017)

== Discography ==
- Busted (2002)
- A Present for Everyone (2003)
- Night Driver (2016)
- Half Way There (2019)

== Awards ==
Number ones in the UK Singles Chart

1. "You Said No" (27 April 2003)
2. "Crashed the Wedding" (16 November 2003)
3. "Who’s David" (22 February 2004)
4. "Thunderbirds" / "3AM" (1 August 2004)

== Tours ==
- Busted: Tour (2003)
- Busted: A Ticket for Everyone (2004)
- Busted: A Ticket for Everyone Else (2004)
- Busted: Pigs Can Fly 2016 (2016)
- Busted: Night Driver Tour 2017 (2017)
- Half Way There Tour (2019)
- 20th Anniversary & Greatest Hits Tour (2023)
- Busted vs McFly Tour (2025)
