= Welcome to Loserville =

Studio album by Son of Dork
- Released: 21 November 2005
- Recorded: 2005
- Genre: Pop punk
- Length: 46:54
- Label: Mercury
- Producers: Gil Norton; The Matrix

Singles from Welcome to Loserville
- 1. "Ticket Outta Loserville" Released: 7 November 2005; 2. "Eddie's Song" Released: 16 January 2006

Alternative cover
- Japanese cover of Welcome to Loserville

Professional ratings
Review scores
Source	Rating
Drownedinsound	3/5 stars
Entertainment.ie	4/5 stars
Gigwise	1/5 stars
Melodic	3/5 stars
Yahoo! Music	3/5 stars

Welcome to Loserville is the only studio album from British pop punk band Son of Dork. The album was released on 21 November 2005 by Mercury Records. The album was later adapted into a musical, titled Loserville the Musical, by band member James Bourne and writer Elliot Davis commissioned and performed by Youth Music Theatre UK and presented at the South Hill Park Arts Centre, Bracknell, in 2009. The show was subsequently retitled Loserville and produced professionally by Kevin Wallace, TC Beech and Youth Music Theatre UK at the West Yorkshire Playhouse. It then transferred to the West End's Garrick Theatre and featured UK pop star Chris Hardman.

The track "Boy Band" on the album was co-written by American band Wheatus. The album was certified Gold in the UK. A deluxe edition of the album was due for release on 17 April 2006. It was due to include six bonus tracks, as well as an additional DVD. The release of the album was later cancelled. The track "Welcome to Loserville" is hidden, and does not appear on the track listing. It can be accessed by rewinding into the pregap, prior to the first track, "Ticket Outta Loserville". The track cannot be accessed if the album is played in a computer.

== Singles ==
- "Ticket Outta Loserville" - 7 November 2005 - entered at #3 on the UK Singles Chart.
- "Eddie's Song" - 16 January 2006 - entered at #10 on the UK Singles Chart.
- "We're Not Alone" - 10 April 2006 - due to be the lead single from the deluxe version of the album, however, both album and single were withdrawn. Theme from the movie Alien Autopsy starring TV duo Ant & Dec.

== Track listing ==
Welcome to Loserville — Standard edition
No.	Title	Writer(s)	Producer(s)	Length
0.	"Welcome to Loserville" (Hidden track within the pregap of Track 1, featuring the London Session Orchestra)	James Bourne • Simon Hale	Simon Hale	2:41
1.	"Ticket Outta Loserville"	Bourne • Charlie Grant • Pete Woodroffe	Gil Norton	3:22
2.	"Eddie's Song"	Bourne • Chris Leonard	Norton	3:45
3.	"Little Things"	Bourne	Norton	3:32
4.	"Party's Over"	Bourne • Leonard	Norton	4:13
5.	"Boy Band"	Bourne • Brendan B. Brown	Norton	3:01
6.	"Sick"	Bourne • Christy • Edwards • Spock	The Matrix	3:32
7.	"Slacker"	Bourne • Michael Raphael	Norton	3:56
8.	"Holly, I'm the One"	Bourne • Grant • Woodroffe	Norton	3:42
9.	"Wear Me Down"	Bourne • Raphael	Norton	3:20
10.	"Murdered in the Mosh" (Choral version hidden at the end of the track)	Bourne • Christy • Edwards • Spock	The Matrix (Choral version Hale)	14:31 (first song 3:15)
Total length:				37:17

Welcome to Loserville — Japanese edition bonus track
No.	Title	Writer(s)	Producer(s)	Length
12.	"Ticket Outta Loserville" (live version)	Bourne • Grant • Woodroffe	Norton	3:20
Total length:				40:30

Welcome to Loserville — Cancelled deluxe edition
No.	Title	Writer(s)	Producer(s)	Length
0.	"Welcome to Loserville" (featuring the London Session Orchestra)	Bourne • Hale	Hale	2:41
1.	"We're Not Alone"	Bourne • Tom Fletcher	Norton	3:23
2.	"Ticket Outta Loserville"	Bourne • Grant • Woodroffe	Norton	3:22
3.	"Eddie's Song"	Bourne • Leonard	Norton	3:45
4.	"End Up Like This"	Bourne • Raphael
5.	"Little Things"	Bourne	Norton	3:32
6.	"Party's Over"	Bourne • Leonard	Norton	4:13
7.	"Go Home Monday"	Bourne • Aaron Kamin
8.	"Boy Band"	Bourne • Brown	Norton	3:01
9.	"Sick"	Bourne • Christy • Edwards • Spock	The Matrix	3:32
10.	"Slacker"	Bourne • Raphael	Norton	3:56
11.	"Colgate Smile"	Bourne • Leonard
12.	"Holly, I'm the One"	Bourne • Grant • Woodroffe	Norton	3:42
13.	"Move On"	Bourne
14.	"Wear Me Down"	Bourne • Raphael	Norton	3:20
15.	"What Happened to Your Band"	Bourne • Raphael
16.	"Murdered in the Mosh"	Bourne • Christy • Edwards • Spock	The Matrix	3:26
17.	"Murdered in the Mosh" (Choral version) (hidden track)	Bourne • Christy • Edwards • Spock	Hale	3:15

Welcome to Loserville — Cancelled deluxe edition bonus DVD
No.	Title	Length
1.	"The Making of "Welcome to Loserville""
2.	"Ticket Outta Loserville - Music video"
3.	"Eddie's Song - Music video"
4.	"We're Not Alone - Music video"
5.	"Band interview"
6.	"The Making of "We're Not Alone""

== Personnel ==
- James Bourne - lead vocals, rhythm guitarist
- Steve Rushton - lead vocals, bassist
- David Williams - rhythm guitarist, backing vocals
- Chris Leonard - lead guitarist, backing vocals
- Danny Hall - drums

== Additional personnel ==
- Tom Fletcher - Guitar and vocals on track 2
- Danny Jones - Guitar and vocals on track 2
- Dougie Poynter - Bass and vocals on track 2
- Harry Judd - Drums on track 2

== Chart performance ==
Chart (2005-2006)	Peak position
Japanese Albums (Oricon)	28
Scottish Albums (OCC)	37
UK Albums (OCC)	35

== Certifications ==
Region	Certification	Certified units/sales
United Kingdom (BPI)	Gold	100,000^{^}
^{^} Shipments figures based on certification alone.
