= Night Drive =

Night Drive may refer to:

== Books ==
- "Night Drive", a 1969 poem by Seamus Heaney from the collection Door into the Dark
- Night Drive, a 1984 comic book by Richard Sala
- Night Drive, a short story by Joe R. Lansdale from The Good, the Bad, and the Indifferent

== Film and TV ==
- Night Terror (film), also known as Night Drive, a 1977 American made-for-television horror thriller film
- Night Drive, a 2011 South African suspense film
- Night Drive (film), a 2022 Indian Malayalam road thriller film
- "Night Drive", a 1952 episode of the US TV series Suspense with Robert H. Harris

== Music ==
- Night Drive (album), a 2007 album by Chromatics
- Night Drive, a 1996 album by Garnet Rogers
- Night Drives, a 2022 album by Kathryn Williams

=== Songs ===
- "Night Drive", an instrumental by Giorgio Moroder from the soundtrack American Gigolo
- "Night Drive", a song by Gotye from Like Drawing Blood
- "Night Drive", a song by Juan Atkins, as Model 500, 1985
- "Night Drive", a song by Jimmy Eat World from Futures
- "Night Drive", a song by The All-American Rejects from Move Along
- "Night Drive", a song by No Devotion from Permanence
- "Night Drive", a song by Norman Brown from Just Chillin' 2002
- "Night Drive", a song by Earl Klugh from Low Ride
- "Night Drive", a track from Romper Stomper soundtrack
- "Night Drive", a song by Ari Lennox from Pho (EP) 2016
- "Night Drive", a song by Brother Firetribe from Feel the Burn

== See also ==
- Night Driver (disambiguation)
- Night (disambiguation)
- Drive (disambiguation)
- Drive Knight, a One-Punch Man character
