= Night Driver Tour 2017 =

2017 concert tour by Busted

- Tour by Busted
- Promotional poster for the tour
- Associated album: Night Driver
- Start date: 28 January 2017
- Legs: 6
- No. of shows: 46 in Europe; 2 in Japan; 1 in USA; 49 in total

Busted concert chronology
- Pigs Can Fly Tour 2016 (2016); Night Driver Tour 2017 (2017); Half Way There Tour (2019)

The Night Driver Tour 2017 was a 2017 concert tour by English pop rock band Busted in support of the band's third studio album Night Driver (2016). It was their second tour since their split in 2005.

The support act was Natives during the first leg of the tour in the United Kingdom and Ireland.

== Setlist ==
1. "Kids with Computers"
2. "Thinking of You"
3. "On What You're On"
4. "Air Hostess"
5. "Night Driver"
6. "Nerdy"
7. "Without It"
8. "I Will Break Your Heart"
9. "Who's David"
10. "Sleeping with the Light On"
11. "Crashed the Wedding"
12. "3AM"
13. "New York"
14. "Year 3000"
15. "What I Go to School For"
16. "Coming Home"
17. "Those Days Are Gone"

Japan

1. "Air Hostess"
2. "Thinking of You"
3. "On What You're On"
4. "Night Driver"
5. "Nerdy"
6. "Who's David"
7. "I Will Break Your Heart"
8. "Meet You There"
9. "Crashed the Wedding"
10. "Sleeping with the Light On"
11. "New York"
12. "You Said No
13. "What I Go to School For"
14. "Those Days Are Gone"
15. "Coming Home"
16. "Year 3000"

Royal Albert Hall Show

1. "When Day Turns Into Night"
2. "Meet You There"
3. "With Out You"
4. "Everything I Knew"
5. "Who's David"
6. "Over Now"
7. "Don't Dream It's Over" (Crowded House cover)
8. "Easy"
9. "Sleeping With the Light On"
10. "Air Hostess"
11. "On What You're On"
12. "Falling for You"
13. "Loser Kid"
14. "Night Driver"
15. "I Will Break Your Heart"
16. "That Thing You Do"
17. "New York"
18. "Crashed the Wedding"
19. "3am"
20. "What I Go to School For"
21. "Those Days Are Gone"
22. "Coming Home"
23. "Year 3000"

== Tour dates ==
Date	Location	Country	Venue	Support
Leg 1 - UK & Ireland
28 January 2017	Norwich	England	The Nick Rayns LCR, UEA	Natives
29 January 2017	Norwich	England	The Nick Rayns LCR, UEA	Natives
30 January 2017	Cambridge	England	Cambridge Corn Exchange	Natives
1 February 2017	Leicester	England	De Montfort Hall	Natives
3 February 2017	London	England	Eventim Apollo	Natives
4 February 2017	Bournemouth	England	Bournemouth O2 Academy	Natives
6 February 2017	Southend-on-Sea	England	Cliffs Pavilion	Natives
7 February 2017	Folkestone	England	Leas Cliff Hall	Natives
9 February 2017	Newport	England	Newport Centre	Natives
10 February 2017	Plymouth	England	Plymouth Pavilions	Natives
12 February 2017	Bristol	England	Bristol O2 Academy	Natives
13 February 2017	Portsmouth	England	Portsmouth Guildhall	Natives
13 February 2017	Brighton	England	Brighton Centre	Natives
16 February 2017	Manchester	England	O2 Apollo Manchester	Natives
17 February 2017	Liverpool	England	Liverpool University	Natives
18 February 2017	Birmingham	England	Birmingham O2 Academy	Natives
20 February 2017	Nottingham	England	Nottingham Rock City	Natives
21 February 2017	Leeds	England	O2 Academy Leeds	Natives
22 February 2017	Newcastle	England	O2 Academy Newcastle	Natives
24 February 2017	Aberdeen	Scotland	GE OIL & GAS Arena	Natives
25 February 2017	Edinburgh	Scotland	Usher Hall	Natives
26 February 2017	Glasgow	Scotland	Glasgow O2 Academy	Natives
28 February 2017	Belfast	Northern Ireland	Waterfront	Natives
1 March 2017	Dublin	Ireland	Dublin Olympia	
Leg 2 - Asia
7 March 2017	Tokyo	Japan	Ebisu Liquidroom	—N/a
8 March 2017	Osaka	Japan	Umeda Akaso	—N/a
Leg 3 - Europe
11 March 2017	Hamburg	Germany	Grunspan	—N/a
13 March 2017	Amsterdam	Netherlands	Paradiso	—N/a
14 March 2017	Paris	France	Trabendo	—N/a
15 March 2017	Cologne	Germany	Underground	—N/a
18 March 2017	Milan	Italy	Fabrique	—N/a
20 March 2017	Barcelona	Spain	Barcelona Apollo	—N/a
21 March 2017	Madrid	Spain	But	—N/a
Leg 4 - North America
2 June 2017	Los Angeles	United States	The Troubadour	—N/a
Leg 5 - United Kingdom
21 June 2017	Glastonbury	England	Glastonbury Festival	—N/a
30 June 2017	Bedfordshire	England	AMP Rocks	—N/a
7 July 2017	Cardiff	Wales	Cardiff University	—N/a
8 July 2017	Bristol	England	Bristol Pride	—N/a
15 July 2017	Kings Lynn	England	Festival Too	Twin Wild; Etham; Amber; Flint Moore
16 July 2017	South Tyneside	England	South Tyneside Festival	—N/a
22 July 2017	Nottingham	England	Splendour Festival	—N/a
27 July 2017	Plymouth	England	MTV Crashes Plymouth	—N/a
28 July 2017	Bolesworth Castle	England	Carfest North	—N/a
19 August 2017	Hylands Park	England	V Festival	—N/a
20 August 2017	Weston Park	England	V Festival	—N/a
27 August 2017	Laverstoke Park Farm	England	Carfest South	—N/a
Leg 6 - England
14 October 2017	London	England	Festifeel	N/A
16 October 2017	Preston	England	Preston Guild Hall	(DJ) Daniel P. Carter
17 October 2017	London	England	Royal Albert Hall	(DJ) Daniel P. Carter
