= Son of Dork =

2005–2007 British pop punk band

- Also known as: SOD
- Origin: United Kingdom
- Genre: Pop punk
- Years active: 2005–2007
- Labels: Mercury; Sicpuppy
- Past members: James Bourne; Steve Rushton; David Williams; Chris Leonard; Danny Hall

Son of Dork were a British pop punk band formed by James Bourne after his previous band, Busted, split in January 2005. The name of the band came from a scene in the 1990 film Problem Child where the chant "Son of Dork" is used. Their debut single, "Ticket Outta Loserville", was released in November 2005, reaching No. 3 on the UK Singles Chart. Their second single, "Eddie's Song", reached No. 10 in January 2006.

== Formation ==
James Bourne placed adverts in publications such as NME and The Stage in order to recruit potential band members for his new project. The members that were chosen had all been involved in bands. Drummer Danny Hall had previously spent ten years with hardcore metal band "Spiral Rocks" and Punk band "Like I Care", whereas guitarist Chris Leonard had been in band "Stamford Amp", the house band on BBC's The Saturday Show in 2002 and had also toured with acts including Brian McFadden and Busted. Steve Rushton was dividing his time between former band "Mr Cheerful", college studies and a job in Sainsbury's. Bourne decided to name the band after a scene in the film Problem Child.

== Music career ==
=== Welcome to Loserville: 2005–2007 ===
In November 2005, Son of Dork released their first single "Ticket Outta Loserville" which reached number 3 in the UK Charts, followed a few weeks later with their debut album Welcome to Loserville. Follow-up single "Eddie's Song" was released in January 2006 and reached number 10 in the UK charts. Son of Dork then penned their next single "We're Not Alone" for Ant and Dec's film Alien Autopsy, although it was never released as a single.

On 6 February 2007 Son of Dork toured with Wheatus, Army of Freshmen, and Bowling for Soup in The Get Happy '07 Tour. The tours were met with a favourable reception and the band performed a new song originally for the deluxe edition of their Welcome to Loserville album called "Colgate Smile".

The band during most of 2007 went under Bourne's self-created record company Sic Puppy Records. During this time they headlined The Sic Tour which gave several unsigned bands an opportunity to perform to the public. The gig took place in Shepards Bush Empire on 24 March and the band debuted new songs including "What Happened To Your Band?" and "Go Home Monday".

=== Split and further projects: 2008–present ===
Although there has never been an official announcement, Son of Dork's split in 2007 was confirmed by Bourne on a tweet in November 2020. He stated 'In the background I was being heavily sued in the high court of justice for the rights to all the Busted songs. I left the band to give my undivided attention to fighting this case which after 4 years I won. Then I started trying to bring my music career back to life.'

Post-split, Bourne would go on to join pop-rock supergroup McBusted before rejoining Busted in 2015. Rushton began a solo career in the US, contributing to soundtracks to films Hannah Montana: The Movie, G-Force and Race To Witch Mountain. He also provided the theme song to The Suite Life on Deck.

On the possibility of a reunion, Bourne stated in an interview that if he was to reform Son of Dork he would only bring back the members who wanted to come back. There was a reunion of sorts when Rushton, Leonard and Bourne, along with the Welsh duo Lilygreen & Maguire, all recorded a cover of Michael Jackson's "Man in the Mirror". In 2019, Bourne stated he'd had ideas for a Son of Dork concept album. In January 2024, Bourne reiterated on the social media site X that he'd do another album if 'people wanted it'.

== Members ==
- James Bourne – lead vocals, rhythm guitar
- Steve Rushton – co-lead vocals, bass
- David Williams – rhythm guitar, backing vocals
- Chris Leonard – lead guitar, backing vocals
- Danny Hall – drums

== Tours ==
- Better Late Than Never Tour 2007 (Headline tour) (Cancelled)
- The Skegness Circular 2007
- Sic Tour 2007 – Headline Act
- Get Happy Tour 2007 (Support for Bowling for Soup with Army of Freshmen and Wheatus throughout the UK)

Welcome to Loserville Live Radio Tour 2006

- 12 & 13 May-Glasgow SECC
- 14 May-Manchester MEN Arena
- 15 & 16 May-Birmingham NEC
- 17, 18 & 19 May-London Wembley Arena

== Legacy ==
In 2009, lead-singer James Bourne co-wrote a musical alongside Elliot Davies based on the band's debut album Welcome to Loserville, titled Loserville. The production was named alongside Tim Minchin's Matilda as evidence of a resurgence in new British musicals by The Stage newspaper after the Leeds opening. In 2012, it opened in the West End.

The song What Happened to Your Band was originally slated to appear on the Welcome to Loserville deluxe album, however after the cancellation Bourne repurposed the song for McBusted. It was later covered and included in Busted's fourth album Half Way There.

== Discography ==
=== Studio albums ===
Year	Album details	Peak positions	Certifications (sales threshold)
Year	Album details	UK	Certifications (sales threshold)
2005	Welcome to Loserville: Release date: 21 November 2005; Label: Mercury Records	35	UK: Gold

=== Singles ===
Year	Single	Peak chart positions		Album
Year	Single	UK	IRE	Album
2005	"Ticket Outta Loserville"	3	15	Welcome to Loserville
2006	"Eddie's Song"	10	24	Welcome to Loserville
2006	"We're Not Alone"	–	–	Non-album single for Alien Autopsy soundtrack
