= Eddie's Song =

2006 single by Son of Dork

- CD1 cover

Single by Son of Dork

from the album Welcome to Loserville
- B-side: "Thunderbirds"; "Two Princes"
- Released: 16 January 2006
- Genre: Pop punk
- Length: 3:44
- Label: Mercury
- Songwriters: James Bourne; Chris Leonard
- Producer: Gil Norton

Son of Dork singles chronology
"Ticket Outta Loserville" (2005)	"Eddie's Song" (2006)

"Eddie's Song"
- CD2 cover

"Eddie's Song" is the second and final single from British pop-punk band Son of Dork's debut and only studio album, Welcome to Loserville (2005). Released on 16 January 2006, the single peaked at number 10 on the UK Singles Chart as well as number 24 in Ireland. The single was the group's final release before being dropped by Mercury Records.

== Music video ==
The video is fronted by ex-rhythm guitarist Dave Williams. He is seen to be a rockstar that has sex with many women, with the women quoting things in newspapers about Eddie, such as "Eddie rocks my world". The video then ends up with newspaper headlines, such as "Eddie had sex with my girlfriend". The video is of Son of Dork playing at a show. The reasoning behind the title of the song is that Son of Dork were thinking of a rock star with the first name of "Eddie", presumably the rock star Eddie Van Halen. The other meaning behind the song is to teach people to wear a condom.

== Track listings ==
UK CD1

1. "Eddie's Song" (radio edit)
2. "Thunderbirds" (Busted cover)

UK CD2

1. "Eddie's Song" (radio edit)
2. "Two Princes" (Spin Doctors cover)
3. "Ticket Outta Loserville" (live version)
4. Enhanced section (includes explicit music video)

UK DVD single

1. "Eddie's Song" (audio)
2. "Eddie's Song" (video with band commentary)
3. "Eddie's Song" (exclusive live video and backstage footage)

== Chart positions ==
Chart (2006)	Peak position
Ireland (IRMA)	24
Scottish Singles Sales (Official Charts)	4
UK Singles (Official Charts)	10
