= Hey Kid =

Single by Matt Willis

from the album Don't Let It Go to Waste
- Released: 14 August 2006
- Recorded: 2006
- Genre: Pop rock
- Length: 3:40
- Label: Mercury
- Songwriters: Matt Willis; Julian Emery; Jason Perry; Jonny Kwiencinski

Matt Willis singles chronology
"Up All Night" (2006)	"Hey Kid" (2006)	"Don't Let It Go to Waste" (2006)

"Hey Kid" is a song by English singer-songwriter Matt Willis, released on 14 August 2006 as the second single from his debut solo album Don't Let It Go to Waste.

The lyrics of this song are about the days after Busted, Willis' original band, split.

This song features two music videos, one being the main video and the other to fit the story of the teen film John Tucker Must Die, in which the song appears in.

On August 20, the song entered the UK top 75 at No. 61, based solely on download sales. The following week it climbed to No. 11 due to the physical release of the single.

The B-side "Me and Your Mother" was also featured on Willis' debut album as a hidden track.

The song also appears in the 2006 action spy film Stormbreaker.

== Track listing ==
Hey Kid — CD1
No.	Title	Writer(s)	Length
1.	"Hey Kid" (radio edit)	Matt Willis; Julian Emery; Jason Perry; Jonny Kwiencinski
2.	"Me and Your Mother"	Willis

Hey Kid — CD2
No.	Title	Writer(s)	Length
1.	"Hey Kid" (radio edit)	Willis; Emery; Perry; Kwiencinski
2.	"All These Things That I've Done" (Jo Whiley session)	Brandon Flowers
3.	"Up All Night" (Jo Whiley session)	Willis; Emery; Jason Perry

== Charts ==
=== Weekly charts ===
Chart (2006)	Peak position
Ireland (IRMA)	42
Scottish Singles Sales (Official Charts)	9
UK Singles (Official Charts)	11

=== Year-end charts ===
Chart (2006)	Position
UK Singles (OCC)	235
