= Loserville =

Musical based on the Son of Dork album Welcome to Loserville

- Original West End production
- Music: Elliot Davis
- Lyrics: James Bourne
- Basis: 2005 album Welcome to Loserville by British pop punk band Son of Dork
- Productions: 2009 Youth Music Theatre UK South Hill Park Bracknell; 2012 Leeds; 2012 West End; 2015 London; 2020 Fredericktown, Maryland

Loserville is a musical with music and lyrics by James Bourne and Elliot Davis, originally created for Youth Music Theatre UK. The story is based on an album, Welcome to Loserville from Bourne's second band, Son of Dork.

Loserville was first performed at South Hill Park Arts Centre in Bracknell by Youth Music Theatre UK in 2009. It then played at the West Yorkshire Playhouse in mid-2012 before opening at the Garrick Theatre in the West End later the same year.

== Synopsis ==
ACT 1

In 1971, at technology company Arch Industries, high school student Michael Dork is mopping the corridors of the building. As Michael sneaks his way into the firm's computer room, he communicates with his best friend and accomplice Lucas Lloyd, who brings him a storage device, onto which Michael transfers the project he has been working on to develop a digital language that would allow computers to communicate with each other. However, the security alarm sounds before completion and Lucas and Michael attempt to escape the premises ("Living In The Future Now").

The next day, Michael and Lucas await the delivery of two brand-new teletype computers to their school, while friends Marvin and Francis are hard at work building the cardboard Star Trek starship they believe will earn them first prize at the annual sci-fi competition: the opportunity to meet the esteemed crew of the real Starship Enterprise, of which Uhura is of particular interest to the group. Michael's friends begin to tease him about the hostility shown towards Michael by Eddie Arch, son of the Head of Arch Industries, to which Michael responds that the opportunity to create his computer communication coding makes it all worthwhile. As Michael attempts to download his project onto the new equipment, however, the computer unexpectedly wipes all of Michael's work, so Lucas, Marvin and Francis rally around Michael in a unified attempt to reassure him ("Don't Let 'Em Bring You Down"). Elsewhere, Holly Manson is undergoing somewhat of a self-transformation ("Little Things - Pre-Reprise") and is excited about her realisation of her identity as a proud feminist, with ambitions of being the first female astronaut, which has so far eluded her owing to her "Brains And Looks" and so has decided she needs to be less attractive to be taken seriously. Eddie, meanwhile, thinks the opposite of himself and his girlfriend Leia feels the same. She has plans for the future for Eddie and herself, which she firmly believes are a certainty owing to the duo's exceedingly good looks. The principal of the school interrupts the daydreaming with the announcement that Michael's activity at Arch Industries the previous evening has earned him a ban from the school's computer lab.

Later, during class, the principal introduces Holly to her new classmates, who mock her for her appearance, and matters are made worse when Holly announces her aspirations of going into space and her computing interests. Michael, however, realises that Holly might be his ticket to continuing his computer project, but is soon taunted by his classmates ("Slacker"), although the comments ultimately fail to distract Michael from his work. He and Lucas search for Holly after class and propose their plan to her, to which she agrees, much to the delight of the boys. Leia's friend Samantha is then seen to make allusions to her own brainy persona ("Brains and Looks - Reprise").

Some weeks later, Michael and Holly's work is advancing much slower than anticipated, while Arch Industries seem to be making a breakthrough with their own network coding project. Michael and Lucas admit their individual feelings for Holly while Eddie attempts to find out from his father which section of Arch Industries he will lead after graduation ("Little Things"). It is decided between Michael's group of friends that they will back Michael up as he asks Holly out ("Don't Let 'Em Bring You Down - Reprise"). Leia, meanwhile, is unimpressed that Eddie is being sent to military school rather than an executive position at Arch Industries and turns her back on him ("Slacker - Reprise").

At The Planetarium, a nervous Michael meets Holly and after an ineffective attempt to deliver the terrible lines fed to him by Lucas via an earpiece, Michael instead decides to speak from the heart, before illuminating the stars of the Planetarium in a romantic gesture ("We're Not Alone"). Elsewhere, a dejected Eddie discovers Holly's previous persona by way of photographs shown to him by his friend Wayne and plans his next move. The schoolkids go on to imagine how they are going to change their lives ("Ticket Outta Loserville").

ACT 2

The sci-fi convention is underway ("We're Not Alone - Reprise"), where Francis and Marvin's model starship takes second place, edged out of the top spot by Samantha's flying saucer entry, and the boys congratulate her, particularly a smitten Marvin.

Later, in the computer lab, a frustrated Michael and Holly turn down Lucas and Marvin's invitation to socialise but soon change their minds after deciding they are overworked. As Michael and Holly leave the lab, Lucas spots them and his envy towards Michael gets the better of him ("Holly, I'm The One). Eddie appears and makes a proposal to Lucas: he will present Lucas' book to the publishing department at Arch Industries if Lucas steals Michael and Holly's work. Lucas accepts the deal.

As the group try to steal the disks on which the project is held, they are caught by Holly. Eddie suspects he has an advantage over Holly and warns her that with his newly acquired photo evidence he will expose her past and ruin her ambitions of space travel if she does not agree to work with him. Holly gives in to Eddie's demands after careful consideration ("Long Run"). Meanwhile, the kids at Samantha's victory party ponder "What's So Weird About Me?" Michael turns up searching for Holly and eventually sees her in an embrace with Eddie, which unbeknownst to Michael is only because Eddie has told Holly to seal her loyalty to him with a kiss. As Michael attempts to intervene, he is brushed off by Eddie and left all alone ("Holly, I'm The One - Reprise").

Holly is not making the progress that Eddie expects of her and she is chastised by him, before being left to contemplate her frustrations towards Eddie ("Sick"). Lucas also has his own issues with Eddie as he finds out Eddie has not upheld his end of their bargain and confesses to Michael his part in Eddie's plot to tarnish Michael's work. Some time later, Holly has an idea about the missing component in the coding project so Eddie calls a press conference. Lucas, meanwhile, shows Michael the letter Holly wrote explaining her circumstances and tells Michael that Holly has informed him of the missing component: the address of the recipient, which was not taken into account by the work she had done alongside Michael. Lucas suggests that Michael demonstrates the breakthrough at the Arch Industries press conference in order to humiliate Eddie ("Genius").

At the conference, Michael sends the message as planned. Eddie's plan is foiled and Michael later reconciles with Holly ("We're Not Alone - Reprise"). As the students gather in the computer lab, Leia approaches Lucas and tells him how much she loved his book. Holly and Michael are cheered upon their entrance and the students erupt in celebration over their technological invention ("Ticket Outta Loserville").

== Productions ==
West End

The show was originally created, produced and performed by Youth Music Theatre UK, in 2009, where it played at South Hill Park Arts Centre in Bracknell. Bourne is also a patron of Youth Music Theatre, along with Ed Sheeran, Peter Duncan and Zoe Wanamaker. The production went on to play at the West Yorkshire Playhouse in Summer 2012, opened at the Garrick Theatre on 17 October 2012, following previews from 1 October. It was directed by Steven Dexter, designed by Francis O'Connor, choreographed by Nick Winston, costumes by O'Connor & Stephen Snell, sound by Simon Baker and lighting by Howard Harrison. The production was originally set to run until 2 March 2013, but closed early on 5 January 2013.

== Musical numbers ==
Act I

- "Living in the Future Now" – (Written By: J.Bourne, E.Davis)
- "Don't Let 'Em Bring You Down" – (Written By: J.Bourne, E.Davis)
- "The Little Things" (Pre-Reprise) – (Written By: J.Bourne, E.Davis)
- "Brains and Looks" – (Written By: J.Bourne, E.Davis)
- "Slacker" – (Written By: J.Bourne, M.Raphael)
- "Brains and Looks" (Reprise) – (Written By: J.Bourne, E.Davis)
- "The Little Things" – (Written By: J.Bourne, E.Davis)
- "Slacker (Reprise)" - (Written By: J.Bourne, M.Raphael)
- "We're Not Alone" – (Written By: J.Bourne, T.Fletcher)
- "Ticket Outta Loserville" – (Written By: J.Bourne, P.Woodroffe, C.Grant)

g

Act II

- "We're Not Alone" (Reprise) – (Written By: J.Bourne, T.Fletcher)
- "Holly... I'm the One" – (Written By: J.Bourne, P.Woodroffe, C.Grant)
- "Long Run" – (Written By: J.Bourne, E.Davis)
- "What's So Weird About Me?" – (Written By: J.Bourne, E.Davis)
- "Holly... I'm The One" (Reprise) – (Written By: J.Bourne, P.Woodroffe, C.Grant)
- "Sick" – (Written By: J.Bourne, L.Christy, G.Edwards, S.Spock))
- "Genius" – (Written By: J.Bourne, E.Davis)
- "We're Not Alone" (Reprise 2) – (Written By: J.Bourne, T.Fletcher)
- "Ticket Outta Loserville" – (Written By: J.Bourne, P.Woodroffe, C.Grant)
- "Slacker" (Finale) – (Written By: J.Bourne, M.Raphael)

== Cast ==
The principal original casts of the original production of Loserville.

Character	West Yorkshire Playhouse	Garrick Theatre, London
Michael Dork	Aaron Sidwell	Aaron Sidwell
Holly Manson	Eliza Hope Bennett	Eliza Hope Bennett
Lucas Lloyd	Richard Lowe	Richard Lowe
Eddie Arch	Gareth Gates	Stewart Clarke
Leia Dawkins	Charlotte Harwood	Charlotte Harwood
Francis Weir	Chris Hardman Ashley Luke Lloyd played the role of Francis for the majority of the run at the Garrick Theatre, London due to the indisposition of Lil' Chris.	
Marvin Camden	Daniel Buckley	Daniel Buckley
Huey Phillips	Robbie Boyle	Robbie Boyle
Wayne Pagoda	Duncan Leighton	Duncan Leighton
Samantha Powden	Witney White	Witney White
Elaine Friend	Lauren Hall	Lauren Hall

- West End Ensemble: Jade Albertsen, Sophie Ayres, Laura Bennett, Matthew Bradley, Andrew Carthy, Segun Fawole, Freya Field, Nathan Graham, Dan Krikler, Ashley Luke Lloyd, Megan Louch, Heather Scott-Martin, Shane Walshe and Sarah Watson

== License ==
Loserville is now available to license through Music Theatre International for amateur and professional licenses.
