= Ticket Outta Loserville =

2005 single by Son of Dork

Single by Son of Dork

from the album Welcome to Loserville
- B-side: "I Want You Back"; "Slacker"
- Released: 7 November 2005
- Length: 3:21
- Label: Mercury
- Songwriters: James Bourne; Charlie Grant; Pete Woodroffe
- Producer: Gil Norton

Son of Dork singles chronology
"Ticket Outta Loserville" (2005)	"Eddie's Song" (2006)

"Ticket Outta Loserville" is the lead single from British pop punk band Son of Dork's debut and only studio album, Welcome to Loserville (2005). Released on 7 November 2005, two weeks prior to the album, the single peaked at number three on the UK Singles Chart as well as reaching number 15 in Ireland.

== Music video ==
The video for the song was directed by Ulf Buddensieck. The band is performing in a garage, and the story is each of them going out with a girl and being popular. It then ends up with the girl being seen with one of the school football team players. There is also an adult version, while they are singing the final chorus, which sees a woman with no bra on underneath some pom-poms. The girl then removes the pom-poms, exposing her breasts.

== Track listings ==
UK CD1

1. "Ticket Outta Loserville"
2. "I Want You Back" (Jackson 5 cover)

UK CD2

1. "Ticket Outta Loserville"
2. Interview with Son of Dork
3. "Slacker"
4. "Ticket Outta Loserville" (video—exclusive live version)
5. "Ticket Outta Loserville" (U-MYX format)

UK DVD single

1. "Ticket Outta Loserville" (audio)
2. "Ticket Outta Loserville" (the video)
3. Son of Dork home movie
4. "Escape from Loserville" (the game)

== Charts ==
=== Weekly charts ===
Chart (2005)	Peak position
Europe (Eurochart Hot 100)	12
Ireland (IRMA)	15
Scottish Singles Sales (Official Charts)	3
UK Singles (Official Charts)	3

=== Year-end charts ===
Chart (2005)	Position
UK Singles (OCC)	109
