= Night Driver (album) =

Studio album by Busted
- Released: 25 November 2016
- Recorded: 2015–2016
- Studio: StrawBox, Los Angeles, California; The Terrarium, Minneapolis, Minnesota
- Genre: Synth-pop; alternative pop
- Length: 43:52
- Label: East West
- Producer: John Fields; Alex Metric

Busted chronology
A Ticket for Everyone (2004)	Night Driver (2016)	Half Way There (2019)

Singles from Night Driver
- 1. "Coming Home" Released: 2 May 2016; 2. "On What You're On" Released: 30 September 2016

Professional ratings
Aggregate scores
Source	Rating
Metacritic	70/100
Review scores
Source	Rating
AllMusic	4/5 stars
Digital Spy	4/5 stars
Drowned in Sound	6/10
Evening Standard	3/5 stars
The Observer	3/5 stars
Q	3/5 stars

Night Driver is the third studio album by English pop rock band Busted. It was released through East West Records on 25 November 2016, and is the band's first album of new material in thirteen years, following on from A Present for Everyone (2003). The album marked a notable shift in sound from their previous albums, incorporating synth-pop and alternative pop elements. It received positive reviews from critics.

== Background ==
In 2005, Busted broke up after Charlie Simpson quit the band largely due to creative differences, and to focus on post-hardcore band Fightstar. In the years that followed, Simpson and the other members of the band, James Bourne and Matt Willis, had various musical projects and ventures.

In 2013, it was announced that Bourne and Willis would be joining with the members of the band McFly to form the rock supergroup, McBusted. Prior to going on tour with the new group, Bourne and Willis visited Simpson to let him know of their plans to move forward with McBusted. The three continued to keep in contact and in 2015, after determining there was a creative common ground within the group following writing sessions in Philadelphia, it was announced that Busted would be reforming with the original lineup.

Originally titled What Doesn't Kill You, the album was revealed to called Night Driver on 9 September 2016.

"We had 100% control. We wrote and recorded the album without a record company," Simpson told Digital Spy. "We paid for it ourselves. We had no A&R guy coming in and being annoying - we just sat in a room and made a record. We then took it to the record company and they bought into that vision."

Willis has admitted he did not enjoy performing the song "Night Driver" live, stating "I hated playing that song because I had to play synth bass and it just bored the tits off me".

== Recording ==
Simpson, Willis, and Bourne traveled to Los Angeles before and after their Pigs Can Fly arena tour and met with producer John Fields to begin writing and recording new material. They expressed in various interviews that there was no desire to continue the sound of their previous work, instead opting to have no expectations in the studio and find a new sound. Sessions took place at StrawBox in Los Angeles and The Terrarium in Minneapolis, Minnesota. Alex Metric co-produced "On What You're On" and "Thinking of You", both of which were also mixed by Wez Clarke. Fields mixed the recordings with Paul David Hager, before the album was mastered by Emily Lazar at The Lodge in New York City. Much of the album was continually recorded without having demos and as a result, many first takes of vocals and instrumentation made the album.

The Japanese bonus-track "Beautiful Mess" was originally written in 2012 by James Bourne as a demo called "Gone" for his then new band Call Me When I'm 18. Prior to the Busted release, Bourne intended to release the song during his solo career. "One of a Kind" is another track from those sessions intended for the aforementioned solo project.

== Promotion ==
On 9 September 2016, the band revealed that their third studio album would be called Night Driver, and that it would be released on 11 November 2016. Prior to the announcement, the first promotional single from the album, "Coming Home", was released on 3 May as a free download from the band's website.

== Singles ==
On 18 September 2016, "On What You're On" was revealed as the first single from the album, with a release date of 30 September. A music video for the track was uploaded to the band's Vevo account on the same day.

On 9 February 2017, the band announced that the second single from the album would be "Thinking of You". Though a music video was planned, Bourne confirmed in November 2018 that it was scrapped. For its release as a single, the track was mixed by TAYST.

=== Promotional singles ===
On 18 October, the band announced that "Easy" would be released as an instant grat track at midnight on 21 October. Likewise, a video of the track, live at Pool Studios, was uploaded to the band's Vevo account on 20 October, along with an announcement that the album's release date had been pushed back to 25 November due to production delays.

On 8 November, the band announced that "One of a Kind" would be released at midnight on 11 November to those who pre-ordered the album.

On 18 November, the band premiered "Thinking of You" live during the Children in Need 2016 telethon in addition to performing "Year 3000".

== Track listing ==
Credits per booklet.

Night Driver — Standard edition
No.	Title	Writer(s)	Length
1.	"Coming Home"	James Bourne; Matt Willis; Charlie Simpson	3:13
2.	"Night Driver"	Bourne; Willis; Simpson; John Fields	3:52
3.	"On What You're On"	Bourne; Willis; Simpson; Fields; Lauren Christy	3:09
4.	"New York"	Bourne; Willis; Simpson; Fields	4:26
5.	"Thinking of You"	Bourne; Willis; Simpson; Fields; Eric Bazilian; Alex Drury	3:15
6.	"Without It"	Bourne; Willis; Simpson; Fields; Bazilian; Christy	4:42
7.	"One of a Kind"	Bourne; Fields; Kelly Scott Orr	3:50
8.	"I Will Break Your Heart"	Bourne; Willis; Simpson; Fields	3:52
9.	"Kids with Computers"	Simpson; Bourne; Willis; Fields	3:16
10.	"Easy"	Bourne; Bazilian	3:31
11.	"Out of Our Minds"	Bourne; Willis; Simpson; Fields	3:21
12.	"Those Days Are Gone"	Bourne; Willis; Simpson; Fields	3:20
Total length:			43:51

Night Driver — Japanese edition
No.	Title	Writer(s)	Length
13.	"Beautiful Mess"	Bourne; Willis; Simpson; Fields; Ollie Spano	3:41
14.	"Meet You There" (live from Abbey Road)	Simpson; Bourne	3:27

Night Driver Rerun — Busted XV edition
No.	Title	Writer(s)	Length
3.	"On What You're On (Original Mix)"	Bourne; Willis; Simpson; Fields; Lauren Christy	3:56
12.	"Those Days Are Gone (Original Mix)"	Bourne; Willis; Simpson; Fields	3:26
13.	"Wrong Somebody (Demo)"	Bourne; Bazillian	3:20

== Personnel ==
Personnel per booklet.

Busted

- Charlie Simpson – vocals, drums, guitars, programming
- James Bourne – vocals, keyboards, guitars
- Matt Willis – vocals, bass

Additional musicians

- John Fields – guitars, bass, drums, keyboards, programming
- Brian Gallagher – saxophone (tracks 3 and 8)
- Cobus Potgieter – drums (tracks 3, 8 and 10)
- Alex Metric – programming, keyboards (tracks 3 and 5)
- Martin Dubka – bass, guitars (track 3)
- Joey Barba – programming (tracks 5 and 12)
- Eric Bazillian – guitars (track 5)

Production

- John Fields – producer, recording, mixing
- Paul David Hager – mixing
- Emily Lazar – mastering
- Pete Ohs – photography
- Simon Emmett – photography
- Zipdesign – design
- Alex Metric – co-producer (tracks 3 and 5)
- Wez Clarke – mixing (tracks 3 and 5)

== Charts ==
Chart (2016)	Peak position
Irish Albums (IRMA)	39
Japanese Albums (Oricon)	141
Scottish Albums (OCC)	15
UK Albums (OCC)	13

== Certifications ==
Region	Certification	Certified units/sales
United Kingdom (BPI)	Silver	60,000^{‡}
^{‡} Sales+streaming figures based on certification alone.
