= Don't Let It Go to Waste (song) =

Single by Matt Willis

from the album Don't Let It Go to Waste
- Released: 11 December 2006
- Recorded: 2006
- Genre: Alternative rock
- Label: Mercury
- Songwriters: Matt Willis; Julian Emery; Jason Perry; Rick Parfitt Jr.

Matt Willis singles chronology
"Hey Kid" (2006)	"Don't Let It Go to Waste" (2006)	"Crash" (2007)

"Don't Let It Go to Waste" is a song by Matt Willis, released on 11 December 2006 as the third single from his debut solo album of the same name. Several days before the single's release, Willis was announced as the winner of the reality TV-show I'm a Celebrity, Get Me Out Of Here!, a show Willis admitted going on purely to boost his music career.

Despite his efforts on the show, the single charted at No. 19.

== Track listing ==
Don't Let It Go to Waste — CD1
No.	Title	Writer(s)	Length
1.	"Don't Let It Go to Waste"	Matt Willis; Julian Emery; Jason Perry; Rick Parfitt Jnr.
2.	"What's the Point"	Willis; Emery; Daniel Carter

Don't Let It Go to Waste — CD2
No.	Title	Writer(s)	Length
1.	"Don't Let It Go to Waste"	Willis; Emery; Perry; Parfitt Jnr.
2.	"Not Over"	Willis; Emery; Carter
3.	"Don't Stop Me Now" (live at Wembley) (with McFly)	Freddie Mercury
4.	"Enhanced Content" (featuring "Don't Let It Go to Waste" (Video))

== Charts ==
Chart (2006)	Peak position
Ireland (IRMA)	44
Scottish Singles Sales (Official Charts)	8
UK Singles (Official Charts)	19
