= Up All Night (Matt Willis song) =

2006 singly by Matt Willis

Single by Matt Willis

from the album Don't Let It Go to Waste
- B-side: "Rock Ya"; "Can I Come Too"; "Overrated"
- Released: 22 May 2006
- Length: 3:44
- Label: Mercury
- Songwriters: Matt Willis; Julian Emery; Jason Perry

Matt Willis singles chronology
"Up All Night" (2006)	"Hey Kid" (2006)

"Up All Night" is the debut solo single by English musician Matt Willis. It was released as a single on 22 May 2006 and appears on his debut album, Don't Let It Go to Waste. The song is about how Willis keeps thinking of a girl, and as a result cannot sleep at night. It debuted at number 52 on the UK Singles Chart on download sales alone. The following week, it peaked at number seven after the physical release. It stayed in the UK chart for a total of four weeks.

The video for "Up All Night" features Willis in a house late at night and flashes back and forth between scenes of Willis having difficulty sleeping and Willis in the midst of a party. Willis's first televised performance of "Up All Night" took place on 7 May 2006 on Top of the Pops. He then performed the song again on the same show on 28 May 2006, three weeks since his TV debut.

== Track listings ==
- CD2 contains a free beer mat, with images of a dragon on the front and Willis on the rear.

CD1
No.	Title	Writer(s)	Length
1.	"Up All Night"	Matt Willis; Julian Emery; Jason Perry
2.	"Rock Ya"	Willis; Perry; Daniel Carter

CD2
No.	Title	Writer(s)	Length
1.	"Up All Night"	Willis; Emery; Perry
2.	"Can I Come Too"	Willis; Damon Wilson
3.	"Overrated"	Willis; Perry; Carter
4.	"Enhanced Content" (Containing Censored Video, X-Rated Video & Gallery)

== Charts ==
=== Weekly charts ===
Chart (2006)	Peak position
Ireland (IRMA)	29
Scottish Singles Sales (Official Charts)	5
UK Singles (Official Charts)	7

=== Year-end charts ===
Chart (2006)	Position
UK Singles (OCC)	190
