= Elliot Davis (composer) =

British composer & musician

Elliot Davis is a British composer, musician and music documentary maker.

== Biography ==
Davis started his career transcribing musical ideas for Lionel Bart. He then went on to work in the West End of London in a musical capacity on Miss Saigon, Cats, Les Misérables, Blood Brothers and Jesus Christ Superstar. He was musical director for the European premieres of Lucky Stiff, Orpheus and The Demon Headmaster, which premiered at the Pleasance Theatre, London. Davis has also collaborated with Stephen Schwartz (composer of Wicked) on re-scoring and arranging his Broadway smash Pippin.

Davis's musical Best Friends and Butterflies formed part of the 2008 Official Olympic Handover Celebrations from Beijing to London when it was played by the BBC Big band in Concert.

The original score Davis composed for the 2010 Druid production of The Sliver Tassie by Sean O'Casey performed at the Town Hall Theatre, Galway, was described as providing "an elegiac lilt to O'Caswey's rousing songs" by Irish Theatre Magazine.

For Youth Music Theatre UK he has written three musicals with James Bourne (Busted/Son of Dork): Loserville: The Musical (2009) based on the album Welcome to Loserville; Out There (2011), an original musical imagining an Apollo astronaut who mysteriously disappears in 1969; and a musical based on Bourne's time in the band Busted called What I Go to School For - the Busted Musical (2016), which premiered at the Theatre Royal Brighton. Loserville and Out There are both licensed by Music Theatre International.

== Works ==
- Watermark, with lyrics by Olivier Award winner Stephen Clark. Performed at the Crucible Theatre, Sheffield, and Waterfront Hall, Belfast. The show is now renamed X
- Limehouse Nights, a period piece set in the Docklands of London, written with Robert Longdon.
- Spooks Run Wild, played for a season in the National Theatre's Touring Tent, whilst Davis's musical score of Hansel and Gretel has played for two Christmas seasons.
- Best Friends and Butterflies (book and musical score)
- The Secret Love Life of Ophelia (by Steven Berkoff)
- Cyclops(2006)
- Once upon a Time at the Adelphi musical, co-written with Phil Willmott for the Liverpool Playhouse in the City's Year of Culture Celebrations.
- Stepping Out (orchestrations and arrangements) Derby Playhouse Production
- The Silver Tassie by Sean O'Casey (composer and musical director), Druid production 2010
- Loserville (with James Bourne) for Youth Music Theatre UK (2009)
- Out There (with James Bourne) for Youth Music Theatre UK (2011)
- What I Go to School For - The Busted Musical (book and new songs), with James Bourne for Youth Music Theatre UK (2016)

== Songwriter ==
He has an exclusive songwriting contract with Warner/Chappell Music. His song 'Lifetime of Love' was a finalist in the London International Song Competition and 'The Village Song' was top three in Radio Two's search for a songwriter competition.

== Awards ==
- Vivian Ellis Prize: Best Musical for Young People (Best Friends and Butterflies); 2000
- TMA award: Outstanding Musical Production (Once upon a Time at the Adelphi) 26 October 2008
