= Don't Let It Go to Waste =

Studio album by Matt Willis
- Released: 20 November 2006
- Recorded: 2005–2006
- Studios: Grouse Lodge; ICP Brussels; Generator Room, Essex
- Genre: Pop rock
- Length: 44:12
- Label: Mercury
- Producers: Jason Perry, Julian Emery

Singles from Don't Let It Go to Waste
- 1. "Up All Night" Released: 22 May 2006; 2. "Hey Kid" Released: 14 August 2006; 3. "Don't Let It Go to Waste" Released: 11 December 2006

Professional ratings
Review scores
Source	Rating
musicOMH	link

Don't Let It Go to Waste is the debut solo album from Matt Willis, released on 20 November 2006. The track "Who You Gonna Run To" features Imogen Heap on vocals.

== Track listing ==
No.	Title	Writer(s)	Length
1.	"Hey Kid"	Willis, Emery, Perry, John Kwiecinski	3:37
2.	"Luxury"	Willis, Emery, Daniel Carter	4:03
3.	"Don't Let It Go to Waste"	Willis, Emery, Perry, Rick Parfitt	4:42
4.	"Up All Night"	Willis, Emery, Perry	3:54
5.	"Ex Girlfriend"	Willis, Emery, Perry	3:30
6.	"From Myself Baby"	Willis, Emery, Perry	2:54
7.	"Fade Out"	Willis, Matt Prime	4:20
8.	"Who You Gonna Run To"	Willis, Emery, Perry, Carter	4:10
9.	"Sound of America"	Willis, Emery, Perry	3:53
10.	"Get Bored"	Willis, Emery, Perry, Carter	3:35
11.	"Falling Into You"	Willis, Emery, Perry, Carter	5:24
12.	"Me and Your Mother" (hidden track at the end of Track 11)	Willis, Robert Solly	3:10

Promo CD
No.	Title	Length
1.	"Up All Night"	3:54
2.	"Hey Kid"	3:37
3.	"Ex Girlfriend"	3:30
4.	"Don't Let It Go to Waste"	4:42
5.	"Fade Out"	4:20
6.	"Luxury"	4:03
7.	"Sound of America"	3:53
8.	"From Myself Baby"	2:54
9.	"Smashing Kelly" (commercially unreleased)
10.	"Get Bored"	3:35
11.	"Falling Into You"	5:24

B-sides
No.	Title	Writer(s)	Length
1.	"Rock Ya"	Willis, Perry, Carter
2.	"Can I Come Too"	Willis, Damon Wilson
3.	"Overrated"	Willis, Perry, Carter
4.	"All These Things I've Done" (Radio 1 Live Lounge Session)	Brandon Flowers
5.	"Up All Night" (Radio 1 Live Lounge Session)	Willis, Emery, Perry
6.	"What's the Point"	Willis, Perry, Carter
7.	"Don't Stop Me Now" (Live at Wembley Arena, with McFly / Queen cover)	Freddie Mercury
8.	"Not Over"	Willis, Perry, Carter
9.	"Crash" (The Primitives cover)	Paul Court, Steve Dullaghan, Tracy Tracy
10.	"The Power of Love"	Huey Lewis, Chris Hayes, Johnny Colla

== Personnel ==
- Alex Clarke - Pro Tools
- Brio Taliaferro - Additional Programming
- Damon Wilson – Songwriting, Drums
- Daniel Carter - Songwriting
- Imogen Heap – Backing Vocals on Track 8
- James Hockley - Vocoder on Track 4
- Jason Perry – Songwriting, Producer, Engineer
- Jeremy Wheatly - Mixing
- John Kwiecinski - Songwriting
- Julian Emery - Songwriting, Producer, Engineer
- Matt Prime - Songwriting
- Matt Willis – Songwriting & Vocals
- Rick Parfitt Jr - Songwriting
- Richard Edgeler - Assistant Mixing
- Terry Emery - Percussion on Track 6

== Promo & touring band ==
- Drums - Damon Wilson, (Richie Mills - Crash Video/Era
- Bass - Daniel Carter, (Jimmy Sims - Crash Video/Era
- Guitar (Main) - Van, (Nick Tsang - Crash Video/Era
- Guitar - Alex Clarke
- Keys - Chris Banks

== Chart performance ==
Chart (2006)	Peak position
Scottish Albums (OCC)	68
UK Albums (Official Charts)	66
