= Matt Willis =

English singer (born 1983)

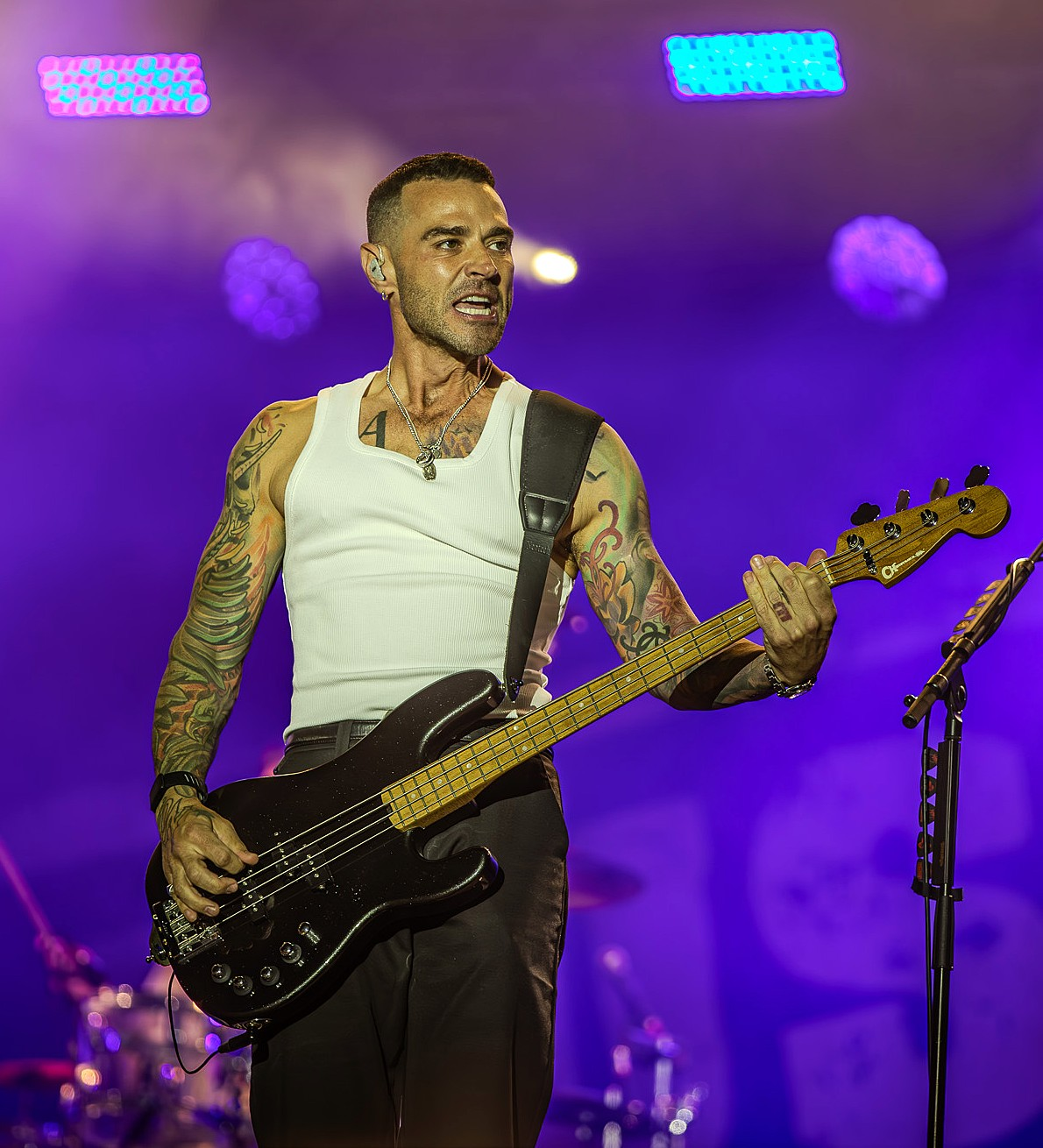
- Willis performing at Car Festival 2025
- Born: 8 May 1983 (age 43); Tooting, London, England
- Spouse: Emma Griffiths (m. 2008)
- Children: 3
- Musical career
- Genres: Pop rock; pop punk; pop; alternative rock
- Occupations: Musician; singer; songwriter; television personality; actor
- Instruments: Vocals; bass guitar; drums
- Years active: 1998–present
- Labels: Mercury (2006–2008, 2012–present); Super (2013–2015)
- Member of: Busted
- Formerly of: McBusted

Matt Willis (born 8 May 1983) is an English musician, singer, songwriter, television personality and actor. He is known as co-founder, bassist and co-vocalist of the pop-punk band Busted. Willis released his debut solo album Don't Let It Go to Waste on 20 November 2006. It contains three top-20 singles.

In December 2006, Willis won the sixth series of the ITV reality series I'm a Celebrity...Get Me Out of Here!. He co-presented the ITV2 spin-off show with his wife Emma in 2007 and 2008. In 2014, Willis played the role of Garth Stubbs in the revived ITV sitcom Birds of a Feather and Luke Riley in the BBC One soap opera EastEnders.

== Early life ==
Willis was born in Tooting and grew up in West Molesey, Surrey. He attended Sylvia Young Theatre School in Marylebone, London, where he met his now friends Lee Ryan, Tom Fletcher, Billie Piper, Jodi Albert and the late Amy Winehouse.

== Career ==
=== Music career ===
==== Busted ====
Willis first found fame in the music industry as one third of the pop band Busted. The band's bassist and vocalist, Willis formed the band as well as co-writing almost all of their songs along with Charlie Simpson, James Bourne and Tom Fletcher, although the latter was a member of McFly. During their career, the trio became successful in the UK and began an upsurge of pop popularity. They had several chart successes and released two studio albums, one live album and a compilation of their greatest hits, available in the U.S.. The band disbanded in 2005 when Simpson left to pursue other projects.

On 10 November 2015, Busted announced on their official website and social media that they would reform with a 13-date tour starting in 2016. Due to demand more dates were subsequently added. Busted released their third studio album, Night Driver, on 25 November 2016. It was then followed in 2019 by Half Way There. In the latter end of that year, Busted began their first hiatus since the split to give space for the members to pursue other projects.

==== Solo career ====
After a brief stay in rehab after Busted disbanded, Willis launched a solo career on Mercury Records, releasing singles in 2006 and 2007, "Up All Night", "Hey Kid", "Don't Let It Go to Waste", and a cover version of the Primitives song "Crash" for the film Mr Bean's Holiday. Just as he was about to depart on his first solo UK Tour with support band The Riverclub, he sacked his agents of six years, 'Prestige Management'. Willis was later dropped by Mercury.

==== McBusted ====
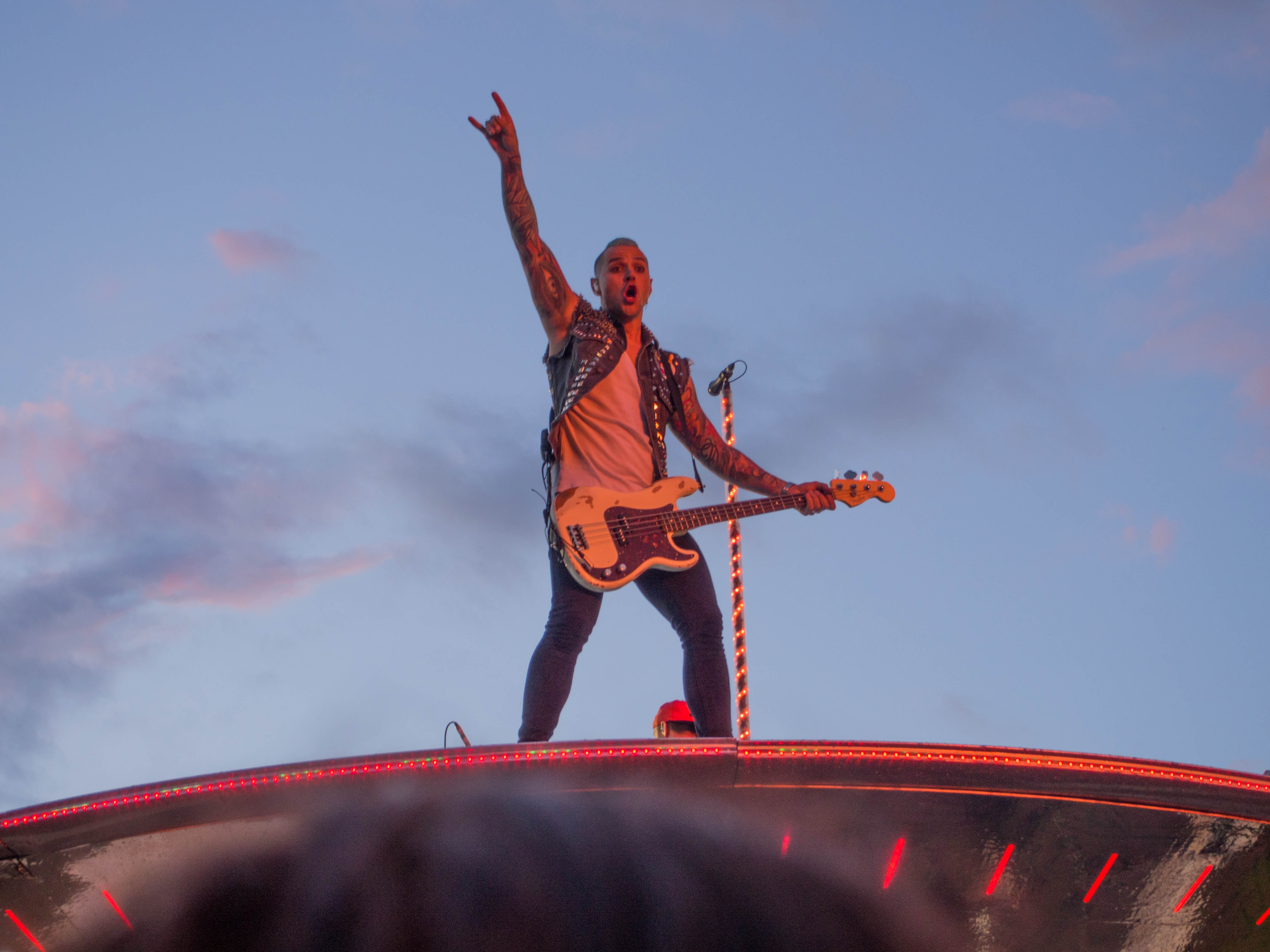
Willis performing with McBusted at British Summer Time (Hyde Park, 2014)

Willis' return to music saw him reunite with one of his ex-Busted bandmates (James Bourne) and with McFly to form the group, McBusted. After a successful tour, they released their debut album McBusted. On 10 November 2015, it was announced that Simpson had decided to rejoin Busted after 10 years away from the band, as a consequence Willis confirmed that McBusted had parted ways for the time being putting the band on hiatus.

=== Television ===
In 2006, Willis took part in the sixth series of Celebrity MasterChef. In December 2006 on ITV, Willis was crowned 'King of the Jungle' on I'm a Celebrity...Get Me Out of Here! despite going into the final day as the 8-1 underdog against Myleene Klass and Jason Donovan. Weighing 13 stone 2lb upon entering, he discovered that he had lost two stone after being weighed again in the jungle. In order to enter the jungle, Willis was required to sky dive from a plane. During his stay, in a compulsory bushtucker trial, Willis ate a kangaroo anus, crocodile penis, crocodile eye, witchetty grub, and some sweeties and mealworms to earn a cooked, luxury meal for himself and the other celebrities. In November 2007, Willis and his then-girlfriend Emma Griffiths went to Australia and presented I'm a Celebrity...Get Me Out of Here! NOW! on ITV2, after Willis had won the 2006 series. Following in 2008, the couple were asked back after winning a presenting award earlier that year. Each series lasted over six weeks in Australia during November and December. In early 2009, Willis and his wife did not renew their contract with ITV2 due to the birth of their first child in June 2009. In November 2011, Willis appeared on Big Brother's Bit on the Side with his wife.

Since winning I'm a Celebrity...Get Me Out of Here!, Willis has also pursued various presenting projects. On 14 February 2007, Willis presented ITV2's coverage of the BRIT Awards with Lauren Laverne, Russell Howard and Alesha Dixon and returned to this role in 2008 alongside his wife, Emma, and Laverne. He interviewed Rihanna, Shayne Ward, Adele, Ozzy Osbourne, Kate Nash and many more including Perez Hilton who became very fond of Willis. Following his success in this, he hosted the MTV Hits night of MTV's Spanking New Music Tour 2007 with his wife Emma, live from the Anson Rooms in Bristol on 21 March 2007. In February 2008, Willis presented the Red Carpet coverage for the E! Entertainment network, at the 2008 BAFTA Awards, alongside his wife and Ryan Seacrest.

In January 2014, Willis played Garth Stubbs in the revival of Birds of a Feather on ITV, but did not return for the second series due to McBusted commitments and was replaced by Samuel James. In February 2014, Willis appeared in the short-term role of Luke Riley in EastEnders, the boyfriend of returning character Stacey Branning (Lacey Turner).

In 2022, announcements stated Willis would host a documentary concerning his experiences with addiction. The documentary, Matt Willis: Fighting Addiction, aired on 17 May 2023. Willis was praised for his honesty. To promote the film, Willis appeared on The One Show, where he opined: "There's some incredible science behind addiction but I learnt a lot through hearing other people's stories which resonated with me [...] I've always been quite open and honest with [my children] but [my daughter and I] watched it together and she had the most incredible questions. I was blown away by her reaction to it." Matt Willis: Fighting Addiction garnered two million viewers.

=== Theatre work ===
In 2010, Willis made his theatrical debut as Nick in Flashdance: The Musical, a West-End production. Later that year, Willis was offered the role of Chuck in an adaption of Footloose. Late 2011 also saw Willis take on the role of Fiyero in Wicked. He continued the role until 27 October 2012, when he was replaced by Ben Freeman.

In August and September 2018, he starred as Orin Scrivello in Little Shop of Horrors in Regent's Park Open Air Theatre. In 2021, it was announced Willis would be joining the UK tour of Waitress playing Dr Pomatter.

From January to May 2026, he played the role of Emcee in Cabaret at the Kit Kat Club. On 4 November 2026, it was announced that Willis would be returning to the Emcee role there from 14 December 2026 to 23 January 2027.

=== Podcast ===
Willis is the co-host of comedy podcast When No One Is Watching alongside comedian Matt Richardson. A range of celebrity guests are featured on the podcast, during which they are asked to admit 'the darkest pleasures and weirdest confessions they would rather no one knew about'.

In 2023, Willis began his own podcast 'On The Mend' in which he interviews guests who 'have hit rock bottom and made it through to the other side'. Guests included Raphael Rowe, Dougie Poynter and Bryony Gordon.

== Personal life ==
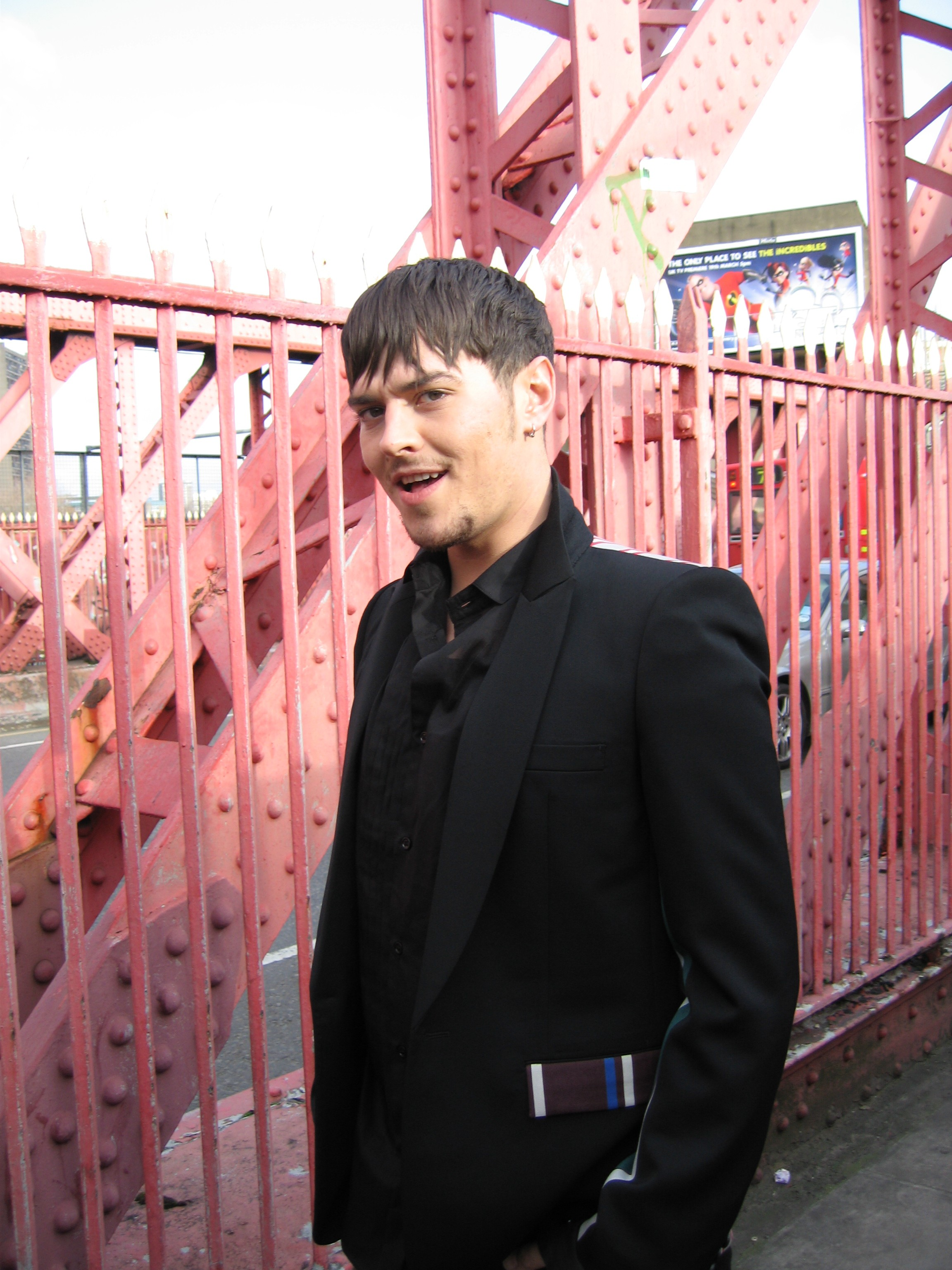
Willis in 2006

In April 2005, aged 21, Willis stayed for three weeks at London's Priory Hospital for the treatment of alcoholism. In July 2006, aged 23, he was admitted again for a few days for drug abuse, because he was addicted to cannabis from the age of 13. He began to have problems from the drug-taking including physiological and memory problems. In June 2008, aged 25, Willis entered a rehab centre in Bournemouth after a marriage ultimatum, as Willis continued to use drugs and abuse alcohol. It was reported that a night out with close friend Amy Winehouse pushed Willis too far. Willis took the full five week course in drugs and alcohol. In November 2007, Willis claimed to have stopped smoking, which he had done from the age of 11, but has since resumed smoking.

Shortly after completing rehab, Willis was recruited to the Church of Scientology but later left the Church after they reportedly advised that he separate from his then-partner of three years, Emma Griffiths, whom the Church deemed to be a "suppressive person".

On 5 July 2008, Willis married Griffiths at Rushton Hall, Northamptonshire. The couple have three children – two daughters born in 2009 and 2016, and a son in November 2011.

On 28 February 2010, Willis was injured in a skiing accident.

During the COVID-19 pandemic in 2021, Willis and his wife completed training with St John Ambulance to act as vaccination volunteers.

== Discography ==
=== Studio albums ===
List of studio albums, with selected chart positions and certifications
Title	Album details	Peak chart positions	
Title	Album details	UK	SCO
Don't Let It Go to Waste	Released: 20 November 2006; Label: Mercury Records; Formats: CD, digital download	66	68

Singles

Year	Title	Chart positions			Album
Year	Title	United Kingdom	Ireland	EU	Album
2006	"Up All Night"	7	29	-	Don't Let It Go to Waste
2006	"Hey Kid"	11	42	-	Don't Let It Go to Waste
2006	"Don't Let It Go to Waste"	19	44	-	Don't Let It Go to Waste
2007	"Crash"	31	-	-	Mr. Bean's Holiday OST

== Filmography ==
=== Film/Television ===
Year	Title	Role	Notes
1998	EastEnders	Teenager	Episode dated 9 January 1998
2000	The Bill	Karl Barrett	Episode: "The Night Before"
2000	Casualty	Lenny Christie	Credited as Matt Sargeant
2003	Busted: Christmas for Everyone	Matt	Television film; credited as Matt Jay
2013	Casualty	Rich Harris	Credited as Matt Jay-Willis
2013	Marple	Cayley	Episode: "Greenshaw's Folly"
2014	EastEnders	Luke Riley	6 episodes
2014	Birds of a Feather	Garth Stubbs	7 episodes
2014	Allies	Private Billy Munns	
2019	Madness in the Method	Anthony Costalino	
2023	Matt Willis: Fighting Addiction	Himself	BBC documentary
2022	Wolves of War	Norwood	Film
2024	Love Is Blind: UK	Co-presenter	Presented with his wife, Emma Willis
2024	Swiped: The School That Banned Smartphones	Co-presenter	Presented with his wife, Emma Willis
2025	Missing You	Darryl	Credited as Matt Jay-Willis
2025	Change your Mind, Change your Life	Co-presenter	With Emma Willis
2025	Wildcat	Lennie	
2026	Celebrity Sabotage	Himself	With Emma Willis

== Theatre credits ==
Year	Title	Role	Venue
2010–2011	Flashdance	Nick Hurley	UK and Ireland tour
2011	Footloose	Chuck Cranson	UK and Ireland tour
2011–2012	Wicked	Fiyero Tigelaar	Apollo Victoria Theatre
2018	Little Shop of Horrors	Orin Scrivello	Regent's Park Open Air Theatre
2020	A Christmas Carol	Bob Cratchit	Dominion Theatre
2021–2022	Waitress	Dr. Jim Pomatter	UK and Ireland tour
2022	2:22 A Ghost Story	Ben	Criterion Theatre
2026 & 2026-27	Cabaret	The Emcee	Playhouse Theatre

Preceded by Carol Thatcher	I'm A Celebrity, Get Me Out Of Here! Winner & King of The Jungle; 2006	Succeeded by Christopher Biggins
