= Pigs Can Fly Tour 2016 =

2016 concert tour by Busted

- Tour by Busted
- Promotional poster for the tour
- Location: United Kingdom; Ireland
- Start date: 11 May 2016
- End date: 4 June 2016
- Legs: 1
- No. of shows: 20

Busted concert chronology
- McBusted's Most Excellent Adventure Tour (2015); Pigs Can Fly Tour 2016 (2016); Busted: Night Driver Tour (2017)

The Pigs Can Fly Tour was a 2016 concert tour by English pop punk band Busted. It was the band's first tour since their split in 2005.

== Background ==
On 5 October 2015, it was reported that Charlie Simpson was set to rejoin Busted, over a decade after his departure lead to their break-up. After this, a photo made its way around the internet that showed the three members of Busted silhouetted in front of a red background. Words appeared to be blurred out at the bottom of the image, but above that was the words "Join us for a special announcement Tuesday November 10th 2015." This implied that the band was reuniting, with further speculation that the three would embark on a reunion tour together. On 10 November 2015, Busted announced a thirteen-date arena tour in the UK and Ireland would take place in May 2016. At the same press conference Busted announced their third studio album. 100,000 tickets were sold in the first hour of being put on sale. Subsequent tour dates were added as a result of high demand.

In early 2016, Busted recorded their third studio album in Los Angeles. On 17 March 2016, Bourne told a fan on Twitter that Busted would decide the release date for their third album that day. It is scheduled for release in the Autumn. The band have also insisted that their reunion is for the long-term; as Bourne told Digital Spy, "We want this to be something that is ongoing. Anything we write now goes towards album four." On 4 April 2016, Busted announced that their tour would be called the Pigs Can Fly Tour 2016 and would include Wheatus and Emma Blackery as special guests. Regarding the title of the tour, Willis told Newsbeat, "The whole pigs can fly thing sums up how we feel about this. There have been times that we thought Busted could never, ever possibly happen and we were quite right in thinking that. But this summarises that anything is possible."

The band announced on 12 April that they were adding a new section of the stage in each show to be known as 'The Pigsty'. Fans that bought tickets for this area would receive exclusive merchandise while also becoming 'an interactive part of the show as it happens live every night'.

On 25 April 2016, it was officially announced that South African drummer Cobus Potgieter, popular on YouTube, would be the supporting drummer for the band during the tour.

== Tour dates ==
Date	City	Country	Venue
11 May 2016	London	England	The SSE Arena Wembley
13 May 2016	Glasgow	Scotland	The SSE Hydro
14 May 2016	Glasgow	Scotland	The SSE Hydro
15 May 2016	Newcastle	England	Metro Radio Arena
17 May 2016	Sheffield	England	Sheffield Arena
18 May 2016	Nottingham	England	Capital FM Arena
20 May 2016	Birmingham	England	Genting Arena
21 May 2016	Manchester	England	Manchester Arena
22 May 2016	Liverpool	England	Echo Arena Liverpool
24 May 2016	Cardiff	Wales	Motorpoint Arena Cardiff
25 May 2016	Bournemouth	England	Bournemouth BIC
27 May 2016	London	England	O_{2} Arena
28 May 2016	London	England	O_{2} Arena
30 May 2016	Belfast	Northern Ireland	The SSE Arena Belfast
31 May 2016	Dublin	Ireland	3Arena
2 June 2016	Cardiff	Wales	Motorpoint Arena Cardiff
3 June 2016	Manchester	England	Manchester Arena
4 June 2016	Birmingham	England	Barclaycard Arena
22 July 2016	Newmarket	England	Newmarket Racecourse
3 September 2016	Wolverhampton	England	Wolverhampton Racecourse
