= Scottish Singles and Albums Charts =

Music chart in Scotland

The Scottish Albums Chart is a chart compiled by the Official Charts Company (OCC) which is based on how physical and digital sales towards the UK Albums Chart fare in Scotland. The official singles chart for Scotland, the Scottish Singles Chart, which was based on how physical and digital sales towards the UK Singles Chart were faring in Scotland has not been published since 11 December 2020. The OCC began publishing the albums chart through their website on the same date.

== History ==
In the late 1970s and early 1980s, Radio & Record News and Record Business magazines compiled Scottish charts which were broadcast on Independent Local Radio stations such as Radio Clyde and Radio Forth; these showed particular favour for hard rock, punk and new wave while soul and other "black" styles would fare less well; for example, on 23 June 1978, Radio & Record News placed Heatwave at number 15 UK-wide but number 40 in Scotland, the O'Jays at number 21 UK-wide but not in the Scottish Top 40 and Bob Marley at number 26 UK-wide but not in the Scottish Top 40, but AC/DC at number 38 UK-wide and number 20 in Scotland, the Clash at number 62 UK-wide and number 22 in Scotland, and the Vibrators at number 65 UK-wide but number 39 in Scotland.

In the late 1980s, as frustration in Scotland at perceived isolation from the Thatcher government grew, pressure was applied for the creation of an official Scottish chart; Brian Guthri of the Scottish Record Industry Association claimed that the official UK charts did not pick up many sales by Scottish acts as they were not polling enough shops in Scotland, citing Win's "You've Got the Power" (the theme song from McEwan's Lager adverts) as an example and a month of research determined significant differences from the UK charts, with indie acts selling particularly well. That autumn, the SRIA voted to set up its own chart, suggesting that the balance of 75 chart return shops in Greater London to 45 in Scotland was unfair. Although a Scottish chart had been broadcast on BBC Radio Scotland beforehand, the first official Scottish Gallup charts were published on 17 March 1991; notably, they placed Scottish band the Silencers at number 6 in the album chart (only number 39 UK-wide) and The Simpsons Sing the Blues album higher than the Inspector Morse soundtrack, which was 11 places higher UK-wide. The launch of this chart was heralded by Neil Ross of the Scottish Record Industry Association, who again suggested that the UK charts were disproportionately slanted towards sales in London and the south of England, while music manager Bruce Findlay suggested that Scotland could potentially produce a music TV show with as much international appeal as the then-popular DEF II series Rapido. From 20 September 1991, a short weekly TV programme based around the Scottish chart was broadcast by BBC1 Scotland on Friday nights, hosted by Nicky Campbell, then of Radio 1 and the chart continued to be broadcast on Monday nights on BBC Radio Scotland although it was dropped, along with other night-time music programmes on that station, during the last year of Gallup's contract. Frankie Miller's song "Caledonia", included in Tennant's adverts which were only shown in Scotland and Northern Ireland, topped the Scottish chart while only being a minor UK-wide hit. An unofficial Scottish Network Chart was also taken by Scottish commercial stations, including Radio Tay, in the early 1990s.

Archives on the Official Charts Company website go back to February 1994, when Millward Brown took over as chart compilers and the number of retailers sampled throughout the UK increased. After this relaunch, Scottish Television launched a show based around the official Scottish chart, called Chart Bite.

How the UK and Scottish charts were compiled diverged several times from 1994. Whereas digital downloads were incorporated into the UK singles chart from April 2005 and albums from April 2006, the Scottish charts remained physical sales only until the week ending 10 October 2009 when digital sales were included. This brought how the two charts were compiled in line for almost five years until the week ending 6 July 2014, when streaming was included in the UK singles chart and later in the UK album chart for the week ending 1 March 2015. The Scottish charts remained compiled of digital and physical sales only until the week ending 20 November 2020, when the singles chart was discontinued and only physical sales are counted for the album chart. The final number one single was "Always" by Scottish band the Snuts.

== Number ones ==
=== 1994 ===
Date	Single	Artist	Album	Artist
27 February	"Without You"	Mariah Carey	Music Box	Mariah Carey
6 March	"Without You"	Mariah Carey	Music Box	Mariah Carey
13 March	"Doop"	Doop	Hit the Highway	The Proclaimers
20 March	"Doop"	Doop	Vauxhall and I	Morrissey
27 March	"Doop"	Doop	Energy Rush: 7th Heaven	Various artists
3 April	"Everything Changes"	Take That	Our Town – The Greatest Hits	Deacon Blue
10 April (Note: Scottish charts were not published on 10 April 1994, therefore a week's gap is inferred.)	"Everything Changes"	Take That	Our Town – The Greatest Hits	Deacon Blue
17 April	"The Real Thing"	Tony Di Bart	Our Town – The Greatest Hits	Deacon Blue
24 April	"Love Is All Around"	Wet Wet Wet	I Say I Say I Say	Erasure
1 May (Note: Scottish charts were not published again until 29 May 1994, therefore a four-week gap is inferred.)	"Love Is All Around"	Wet Wet Wet	I Say I Say I Say	Erasure
8 May	"Love Is All Around"	Wet Wet Wet	I Say I Say I Say	Erasure
15 May	"Love Is All Around"	Wet Wet Wet	I Say I Say I Say	Erasure
22 May	"Love Is All Around"	Wet Wet Wet	I Say I Say I Say	Erasure
29 May	"Love Is All Around"	Wet Wet Wet	Top Gear	Various artists
5 June (Note: Scottish charts were not published again until 3 July 1994, therefore a four-week gap is inferred.)	"Love Is All Around"	Wet Wet Wet	Top Gear	Various artists
12 June	"Love Is All Around"	Wet Wet Wet	Top Gear	Various artists
19 June	"Love Is All Around"	Wet Wet Wet	Top Gear	Various artists
26 June	"Love Is All Around"	Wet Wet Wet	Top Gear	Various artists
3 July	"Love Is All Around"	Wet Wet Wet	Top Gear	Various artists
10 July	"Love Is All Around"	Wet Wet Wet	Dance Zone – Level Two	Various artists
17 July	"Love Is All Around"	Wet Wet Wet	End of Part One: Their Greatest Hits	Wet Wet Wet
24 July	"Love Is All Around"	Wet Wet Wet	End of Part One: Their Greatest Hits	Wet Wet Wet
31 July	"Love Is All Around"	Wet Wet Wet	End of Part One: Their Greatest Hits	Wet Wet Wet
7 August	"Love Is All Around"	Wet Wet Wet	Now That's What I Call Music! 28	Various artists
14 August	"Love Is All Around"	Wet Wet Wet	Now That's What I Call Music! 28	Various artists
21 August	"Love Is All Around"	Wet Wet Wet	Now That's What I Call Music! 28	Various artists
28 August	"Love Is All Around"	Wet Wet Wet	Now That's What I Call Music! 28	Various artists
4 September	"Love Is All Around"	Wet Wet Wet	Definitely Maybe	Oasis
11 September	"Saturday Night"	Whigfield	The Best Rock Album in the World... Ever!	Various artists
18 September	"Saturday Night"	Whigfield	The Best Rock Album in the World... Ever!	Various artists
25 September	"Saturday Night"	Whigfield	The Best Rock Album in the World... Ever!	Various artists
2 October	"Saturday Night"	Whigfield	Monster	R.E.M.
9 October	"Sure"	Take That	Monster	R.E.M.
16 October	"Sure"	Take That	Cross Road	Bon Jovi
23 October	"Saturday Night"	Whigfield	Cross Road	Bon Jovi
30 October	"Baby Come Back"	Pato Banton featuring Ali and Robin Campbell	Cross Road	Bon Jovi
6 November	"Baby Come Back"	Pato Banton featuring Ali and Robin Campbell	The Greatest Hits	INXS
13 November	"Baby Come Back"	Pato Banton featuring Ali and Robin Campbell	Cross Road	Bon Jovi
20 November	"Another Night"	(MC Sar &) The Real McCoy	Now That's What I Call Music! 29	Various artists
27 November	"Love Spreads"	The Stone Roses	Now That's What I Call Music! 29	Various artists
4 December	"Stay Another Day"	East 17	Now That's What I Call Music! 29	Various artists
11 December	"Stay Another Day"	East 17	Now That's What I Call Music! 29	Various artists
18 December	"Stay Another Day"	East 17	Carry On up the Charts: The Best of The Beautiful South	The Beautiful South
25 December	"Stay Another Day"	East 17	Carry On up the Charts: The Best of The Beautiful South	The Beautiful South

=== 1995 ===
Date	Single	Artist	Album	Artist
1 January	"Cotton Eye Joe"	Rednex	Carry On up the Charts: The Best of The Beautiful South	The Beautiful South
8 January	"Cotton Eye Joe"	Rednex	Carry On up the Charts: The Best of The Beautiful South	The Beautiful South
15 January	"Cotton Eye Joe"	Rednex	Carry On up the Charts: The Best of The Beautiful South	The Beautiful South
22 January	"Cotton Eye Joe"	Rednex	Carry On up the Charts: The Best of The Beautiful South	The Beautiful South
29 January	"Cotton Eye Joe"	Rednex	The Best Punk Album in the World...Ever!	Various artists
5 February	"Think Twice"	Celine Dion	Good News from the Next World	Simple Minds
12 February	"Think Twice"	Celine Dion	The Colour of My Love	Celine Dion
19 February	"Think Twice"	Celine Dion	The Colour of My Love	Celine Dion
26 February	"Think Twice"	Celine Dion	The Colour of My Love	Celine Dion
5 March	"Think Twice"	Celine Dion	Greatest Hits	Bruce Springsteen
12 March	"Think Twice"	Celine Dion	Medusa	Annie Lennox
19 March	"Love Can Build a Bridge"	Cher, Chrissie Hynde & Neneh Cherry with Eric Clapton	Elastica	Elastica
26 March	"Don't Stop (Wiggle Wiggle)"	The Outhere Brothers	The Colour of My Love	Celine Dion
2 April	"Back for Good"	Take That	Greatest Hits	Bruce Springsteen
9 April	"Back for Good"	Take That	Greatest Hits	Bruce Springsteen
16 April	"Back for Good"	Take That	Picture This	Wet Wet Wet
23 April	"Back for Good"	Take That	Now That's What I Call Music! 30	Various artists
30 April	"Some Might Say"	Oasis	Now That's What I Call Music! 30	Various artists
7 May	"Some Might Say"	Oasis	Nobody Else	Take That
14 May	"Unchained Melody" / "(There'll Be Bluebirds Over) The White Cliffs of Dover"	Robson & Jerome	Nobody Else	Take That
21 May	"Unchained Melody" / "(There'll Be Bluebirds Over) The White Cliffs of Dover"	Robson & Jerome	Stanley Road	Paul Weller
28 May	"Unchained Melody" / "(There'll Be Bluebirds Over) The White Cliffs of Dover"	Robson & Jerome	On a Dance Tip 2	Various artists
4 June	"Unchained Melody" / "(There'll Be Bluebirds Over) The White Cliffs of Dover"	Robson & Jerome	Pulse	Pink Floyd
11 June	"Hold Me, Thrill Me, Kiss Me, Kill Me"	U2	Pulse	Pink Floyd
18 June	"Unchained Melody" / "(There'll Be Bluebirds Over) The White Cliffs of Dover"	Robson & Jerome	HIStory: Past, Present and Future, Book I	Michael Jackson
25 June	"Unchained Melody" / "(There'll Be Bluebirds Over) The White Cliffs of Dover"	Robson & Jerome	These Days	Bon Jovi
2 July	"Unchained Melody" / "(There'll Be Bluebirds Over) The White Cliffs of Dover"	Robson & Jerome	Pride: The Very Best of Scotland	Various artists
9 July	"Boom Boom Boom"	The Outhere Brothers	Pride: The Very Best of Scotland	Various artists
16 July	"Boom Boom Boom"	The Outhere Brothers	Pride: The Very Best of Scotland	Various artists
23 July	"Boom Boom Boom"	The Outhere Brothers	Pride: The Very Best of Scotland	Various artists
30 July	"Never Forget"	Take That	Pride: The Very Best of Scotland	Various artists
6 August	"Never Forget"	Take That	Now That's What I Call Music! 31	Various artists
13 August	"Never Forget"	Take That	Now That's What I Call Music! 31	Various artists
20 August	"Roll with It"	Oasis	Now That's What I Call Music! 31	Various artists
27 August	"Country House"	Blur	Now That's What I Call Music! 31	Various artists
3 September	"I'll Be There for You"	The Rembrandts	The Charlatans	The Charlatans
10 September	"Stayin' Alive"	N-Trance featuring Ricardo da Force	Help	Various artists
17 September	"Stayin' Alive"	N-Trance featuring Ricardo da Force	The Great Escape	Blur
24 September	"Fairground"	Simply Red	The Great Escape	Blur
1 October	"Fairground"	Simply Red	Heartbeat: Forever Yours	Various artists
8 October	"Fairground"	Simply Red	(What's the Story) Morning Glory?	Oasis
15 October	"Fairground"	Simply Red	Life	Simply Red
22 October	"I'd Lie for You (And That's the Truth)"	Meat Loaf	(What's the Story) Morning Glory?	Oasis
29 October	"Gangsta's Paradise"	Coolio featuring L.V.	(What's the Story) Morning Glory?	Oasis
5 November	"I Believe" / "Up on the Roof"	Robson & Jerome	Different Class	Pulp
12 November	"I Believe" / "Up on the Roof"	Robson & Jerome	(What's the Story) Morning Glory?	Oasis
19 November	"I Believe" / "Up on the Roof"	Robson & Jerome	Robson & Jerome	Robson & Jerome
26 November	"I Believe" / "Up on the Roof"	Robson & Jerome	Robson & Jerome	Robson & Jerome
3 December	"I Believe" / "Up on the Roof"	Robson & Jerome	Robson & Jerome	Robson & Jerome
10 December	"Free as a Bird"	The Beatles	Robson & Jerome	Robson & Jerome
17 December	"Earth Song"	Michael Jackson	Robson & Jerome	Robson & Jerome
24 December	"Wonderwall"	The Mike Flowers Pops	Robson & Jerome	Robson & Jerome
31 December	"Earth Song"	Michael Jackson	(What's the Story) Morning Glory?	Oasis

=== 1996 ===
Date	Single	Artist	Album	Artist
7 January	"Earth Song"	Michael Jackson	(What's the Story) Morning Glory?	Oasis
14 January	"Jesus to a Child"	George Michael	(What's the Story) Morning Glory?	Oasis
21 January	"Spaceman"	Babylon Zoo	(What's the Story) Morning Glory?	Oasis
28 January	"Spaceman"	Babylon Zoo	(What's the Story) Morning Glory?	Oasis
4 February	"Spaceman"	Babylon Zoo	(What's the Story) Morning Glory?	Oasis
11 February	"Spaceman"	Babylon Zoo	(What's the Story) Morning Glory?	Oasis
18 February	"Children"	Robert Miles	Expecting to Fly	The Bluetones
25 February	"Don't Look Back in Anger"	Oasis	(What's the Story) Morning Glory?	Oasis
3 March	"How Deep Is Your Love"	Take That	(What's the Story) Morning Glory?	Oasis
10 March	"How Deep Is Your Love"	Take That	(What's the Story) Morning Glory?	Oasis
17 March	"Children"	Robert Miles	Falling into You	Celine Dion
24 March	"Children"	Robert Miles	Now That's What I Call Music! 33	Various artists
31 March	"The X-Files"	Mark Snow	Greatest Hits	Take That
7 April	"Ooh Aah... Just a Little Bit"	Gina G	Greatest Hits	Take That
14 April	"Ooh Aah... Just a Little Bit"	Gina G	Greatest Hits	Take That
21 April	"Ooh Aah... Just a Little Bit"	Gina G	Greatest Hits	Take That
28 April	"Ooh Aah... Just a Little Bit"	Gina G	Jagged Little Pill	Alanis Morissette
5 May	"Ooh Aah... Just a Little Bit"	Gina G	Jagged Little Pill	Alanis Morissette
12 May	"Ooh Aah... Just a Little Bit"	Gina G	Older	George Michael
19 May (Note: Scottish charts were not published on 19 May 1996, therefore a week's gap is inferred.)	"Ooh Aah... Just a Little Bit"	Gina G	Older	George Michael
26 May	"Ooh Aah... Just a Little Bit"	Gina G	Older	George Michael
2 June	"Killing Me Softly"	Fugees	Older	George Michael
9 June	"Killing Me Softly"	Fugees	Load	Metallica
16 June	"Killing Me Softly"	Fugees	Jagged Little Pill	Alanis Morissette
23 June	"Killing Me Softly"	Fugees	Jagged Little Pill	Alanis Morissette
30 June	"Killing Me Softly"	Fugees	Recurring Dream: The Very Best of Crowded House	Crowded House
7 July	"Killing Me Softly"	Fugees	Recurring Dream: The Very Best of Crowded House	Crowded House
14 July	"Killing Me Softly"	Fugees	Recurring Dream: The Very Best of Crowded House	Crowded House
21 July	"Wannabe"	Spice Girls	Recurring Dream: The Very Best of Crowded House	Crowded House
28 July	"Wannabe"	Spice Girls	Jagged Little Pill	Alanis Morissette
4 August	"Freedom"	Robbie Williams	Jagged Little Pill	Alanis Morissette
11 August	"Wannabe"	Spice Girls	Jagged Little Pill	Alanis Morissette
18 August	"Wannabe"	Spice Girls	Now That's What I Call Music! 34	Various artists
25 August	"Wannabe"	Spice Girls	Now That's What I Call Music! 34	Various artists
1 September	"One to Another"	The Charlatans	Now That's What I Call Music! 34	Various artists
8 September	"Flava"	Peter Andre	Now That's What I Call Music! 34	Various artists
15 September	"Breakfast at Tiffany's"	Deep Blue Something	New Adventures in Hi-Fi	R.E.M.
22 September	"Breakfast at Tiffany's"	Deep Blue Something	K	Kula Shaker
29 September	"Breakfast at Tiffany's"	Deep Blue Something	K	Kula Shaker
6 October	"Breakfast at Tiffany's"	Deep Blue Something	K	Kula Shaker
13 October	"Words"	Boyzone	Long Distance	Runrig
20 October	"Say You'll Be There"	Spice Girls	Long Distance	Runrig
27 October	"Say You'll Be There"	Spice Girls	Blue Is the Colour	The Beautiful South
3 November	"What Becomes of the Brokenhearted" / "Saturday Night at the Movies" / "You'll Never Walk Alone"	Robson & Jerome	A Different Beat	Boyzone
10 November	"What Becomes of the Brokenhearted" / "Saturday Night at the Movies" / "You'll Never Walk Alone"	Robson & Jerome	Spice	Spice Girls
17 November	"Breathe"	The Prodigy	Take Two	Robson & Jerome
24 November	"Breathe"	The Prodigy	Take Two	Robson & Jerome
1 December	"One and One"	Robert Miles featuring Maria Nayler	Now That's What I Call Music! 35	Various artists
8 December	"A Different Beat"	Boyzone	Spice	Spice Girls
15 December	"Knockin' on Heaven's Door" / "Throw These Guns Away"	Dunblane	Spice	Spice Girls
22 December	"2 Become 1"	Spice Girls	Spice	Spice Girls
29 December	"2 Become 1"	Spice Girls	Spice	Spice Girls

=== 1997 ===
Date	Single	Artist	Album	Artist
5 January	"2 Become 1"	Spice Girls	Spice	Spice Girls
12 January	"Freedom 2"	QFX	Spice	Spice Girls
19 January	"Say What You Want"	Texas	Spice	Spice Girls
26 January	"Beetlebum"	Blur	Evita	Original Cast Recording
2 February	"Where Do You Go"	No Mercy	Glow	Reef
9 February	"Discothèque"	U2	White on Blonde	Texas
16 February	"Don't Speak"	No Doubt	White on Blonde	Texas
23 February	"Don't Speak"	No Doubt	White on Blonde	Texas
2 March	"Don't Speak"	No Doubt	The Journey	911
9 March	"Mama/Who Do You Think You Are"	Spice Girls	Pop	U2
16 March	"Mama/Who Do You Think You Are"	Spice Girls	Spice	Spice Girls
23 March	"Mama/Who Do You Think You Are"	Spice Girls	Spice	Spice Girls
30 March	"North Country Boy"	The Charlatans	Now That's What I Call Music! 36	Various artists
6 April	"Bellissima"	DJ Quicksilver	Now That's What I Call Music! 36	Various artists
13 April	"Song 2"	Blur	Now That's What I Call Music! 36	Various artists
20 April	"Old Before I Die"	Robbie Williams	Mother Nature Calls	Cast
27 April	"Bodyshakin'"	911	Tellin' Stories	The Charlatans
4 May	"Love Is the Law"	The Seahorses	White on Blonde	Texas
11 May	"Lovefool"	The Cardigans	White on Blonde	Texas
18 May	"You're Not Alone"	Olive	White on Blonde	Texas
25 May	"I Wanna Be the Only One"	Eternal featuring BeBe Winans	White on Blonde	Texas
1 June	"MMMBop"	Hanson	Do It Yourself	The Seahorses
8 June	"MMMBop"	Hanson	The Best of Bob Dylan	Bob Dylan
15 June	"MMMBop"	Hanson	Best Scottish Album in the World...Ever!	Various artists
22 June	"Bitter Sweet Symphony"	The Verve	OK Computer	Radiohead
29 June	"Ecuador"	Sash! featuring Rodriguez	Best Scottish Album in the World...Ever!	Various artists
6 July	"I'll Be Missing You"	Puff Daddy & Faith Evans featuring 112	The Fat of the Land	The Prodigy
13 July	"D'You Know What I Mean?"	Oasis	The Fat of the Land	The Prodigy
20 July	"D'You Know What I Mean?"	Oasis	Now That's What I Call Music! 37	Various artists
27 July	"Picture of You"	Boyzone	Now That's What I Call Music! 37	Various artists
3 August	"I'll Be Missing You"	Puff Daddy & Faith Evans featuring 112	Now That's What I Call Music! 37	Various artists
10 August	"Men in Black"	Will Smith	White on Blonde	Texas
17 August	"Men in Black"	Will Smith	White on Blonde	Texas
24 August	"Tubthumping"	Chumbawamba	Be Here Now	Oasis
31 August	"Tubthumping"	Chumbawamba	Be Here Now	Oasis
7 September	"The Drugs Don't Work"	The Verve	Be Here Now	Oasis
14 September	"Something About the Way You Look Tonight/Candle in the Wind 1997"	Elton John	Be Here Now	Oasis
21 September	"Something About the Way You Look Tonight/Candle in the Wind 1997"	Elton John	Marchin' Already	Ocean Colour Scene
28 September	"Something About the Way You Look Tonight/Candle in the Wind 1997"	Elton John	Be Here Now	Oasis
5 October	"Something About the Way You Look Tonight/Candle in the Wind 1997"	Elton John	Urban Hymns	The Verve
12 October	"Something About the Way You Look Tonight/Candle in the Wind 1997"	Elton John	Urban Hymns	The Verve
19 October	"Spice Up Your Life"	Spice Girls	Urban Hymns	The Verve
26 October	"Barbie Girl"	Aqua	Urban Hymns	The Verve
2 November	"Barbie Girl"	Aqua	Urban Hymns	The Verve
9 November	"Barbie Girl"	Aqua	Spiceworld	Spice Girls
16 November	"Barbie Girl"	Aqua	Spiceworld	Spice Girls
23 November	"Perfect Day"	Various artists	Now That's What I Call Music! 38	Various artists
30 November	"Perfect Day"	Various artists	Now That's What I Call Music! 38	Various artists
7 December	"Teletubbies say 'Eh-oh!'"	Teletubbies	Now That's What I Call Music! 38	Various artists
14 December	"Teletubbies say 'Eh-oh!'"	Teletubbies	Now That's What I Call Music! 38	Various artists
21 December	"Teletubbies say 'Eh-oh!'"	Teletubbies	Urban Hymns	The Verve
28 December	"Too Much"	Spice Girls	Urban Hymns	The Verve

=== 1998 ===
Date	Single	Artist	Album	Artist
4 January	"Perfect Day"	Various artists	Urban Hymns	The Verve
11 January	"Never Ever"	All Saints	Urban Hymns	The Verve
18 January	"All Around the World"	Oasis	Urban Hymns	The Verve
25 January	"Never Ever"	All Saints	Urban Hymns	The Verve
1 February	"Doctor Jones"	Aqua	Life thru a Lens	Robbie Williams
8 February	"Doctor Jones"	Aqua	Unfinished Monkey Business	Ian Brown
15 February	"My Heart Will Go On"	Celine Dion	Urban Hymns	The Verve
22 February	"Brimful of Asha (The Norman Cook Remix)"	Cornershop	Titanic: Music from the Motion Picture	James Horner
1 March	"Frozen"	Madonna	Melting Pot	The Charlatans
8 March	"My Heart Will Go On"	Celine Dion	Ray of Light	Madonna
15 March	"It's Like That"	Run-D.M.C. vs. Jason Nevins	Ray of Light	Madonna
22 March	"It's Like That"	Run-D.M.C. vs. Jason Nevins	Let's Talk About Love	Celine Dion
29 March	"It's Like That"	Run-D.M.C. vs. Jason Nevins	The Best Of	James
5 April	"It's Like That"	Run-D.M.C. vs. Jason Nevins	The Best Of	James
12 April	"It's Like That"	Run-D.M.C. vs. Jason Nevins	Now That's What I Call Music! 39	Various artists
19 April	"It's Like That"	Run-D.M.C. vs. Jason Nevins	Now That's What I Call Music! 39	Various artists
26 April	"All That I Need"	Boyzone	Now That's What I Call Music! 39	Various artists
3 May	"Ray of Light"	Madonna	Now That's What I Call Music! 39	Various artists
10 May	"Turn Back Time"	Aqua	Now That's What I Call Music! 39	Various artists
17 May	"Feel It"	The Tamperer featuring Maya	Version 2.0	Garbage
24 May	"Feel It"	The Tamperer featuring Maya	Blue	Simply Red
31 May	"C'est la Vie"	B*Witched	Where We Belong	Boyzone
7 June	"Don't Come Home Too Soon"	Del Amitri	When We Were the New Boys	Rod Stewart
14 June	"Carnaval de Paris"	Dario G	When We Were the New Boys	Rod Stewart
21 June	"Carnaval de Paris"	Dario G	When We Were the New Boys	Rod Stewart
28 June	"Carnaval de Paris"	Dario G	Fresh Hits 98	Various artists
5 July	"C'est la Vie"	B*Witched	Fresh Hits 98	Various artists
12 July	"C'est la Vie"	B*Witched	Fresh Hits 98	Various artists
19 July	"Deeper Underground"	Jamiroquai	Fresh Hits 98	Various artists
26 July	"Viva Forever"	Spice Girls	Talk on Corners	The Corrs
2 August	"Viva Forever"	Spice Girls	Fresh Hits 98	Various artists
9 August	"No Matter What"	Boyzone	Now That's What I Call Music! 40	Various artists
16 August	"No Matter What"	Boyzone	Now That's What I Call Music! 40	Various artists
23 August	"No Matter What"	Boyzone	Now That's What I Call Music! 40	Various artists
30 August	"No Matter What"	Boyzone	Where We Belong	Boyzone
6 September	"No Matter What"	Boyzone	Where We Belong	Boyzone
13 September	"Millennium"	Robbie Williams	Hatful of Rain (The Best of Del Amitri)	Del Amitri
20 September	"Millennium"	Robbie Williams	This Is My Truth Tell Me Yours	Manic Street Preachers
27 September	"Rollercoaster"	B*Witched	This Is My Truth Tell Me Yours	Manic Street Preachers
4 October	"Rollercoaster"	B*Witched	This Is My Truth Tell Me Yours	Manic Street Preachers
11 October	"Girlfriend"	Billie	Hits	Phil Collins
18 October	"More Than a Woman"	911	Quench	The Beautiful South
25 October	"Believe"	Cher	Quench	The Beautiful South
1 November	"Believe"	Cher	I've Been Expecting You	Robbie Williams
8 November	"Believe"	Cher	The Best of 1980-1990	U2
15 November	"Believe"	Cher	Ladies & Gentlemen: The Best of George Michael	George Michael
22 November	"Believe"	Cher	Ladies & Gentlemen: The Best of George Michael	George Michael
29 November	"Believe"	Cher	Now That's What I Call Music! 41	Various artists
6 December	"Believe"	Cher	Now That's What I Call Music! 41	Various artists
13 December	"To You I Belong"	B*Witched	Now That's What I Call Music! 41	Various artists
20 December	"Goodbye"	Spice Girls	Ladies & Gentlemen: The Best of George Michael	George Michael
27 December	"Chocolate Salty Balls (P.S. I Love You)"	Chef	Ladies & Gentlemen: The Best of George Michael	George Michael

=== 1999 ===
Date	Single	Artist	Album	Artist
3 January	"Heartbeat/Tragedy"	Steps	Step One	Steps
10 January	"Praise You"	Fatboy Slim	I've Been Expecting You	Robbie Williams
17 January	"A Little Bit More"	911	You've Come a Long Way, Baby	Fatboy Slim
24 January	"Pretty Fly (for a White Guy)"	The Offspring	You've Come a Long Way, Baby	Fatboy Slim
31 January	"Pretty Fly (for a White Guy)"	The Offspring	You've Come a Long Way, Baby	Fatboy Slim
7 February	"Maria"	Blondie	You've Come a Long Way, Baby	Fatboy Slim
14 February	"Protect Your Mind (For the Love of a Princess)"	DJ Sakin & Friends	Love Songs	Various artists
21 February	"...Baby One More Time"	Britney Spears	Euphoria	Various artists
28 February	"...Baby One More Time"	Britney Spears	Euphoria	Various artists
7 March	"When the Going Gets Tough"	Boyzone	Euphoria	Various artists
14 March	"When the Going Gets Tough"	Boyzone	Performance and Cocktails	Stereophonics
21 March	"When the Going Gets Tough"	Boyzone	13	Blur
28 March	"Flat Beat"	Mr. Oizo	New Hits 99	Various artists
4 April	"Flat Beat"	Mr. Oizo	Now That's What I Call Music! 42	Various artists
11 April	"Perfect Moment"	Martine McCutcheon	Now That's What I Call Music! 42	Various artists
18 April	"Perfect Moment"	Martine McCutcheon	Now That's What I Call Music! 42	Various artists
25 April	"In Our Lifetime"	Texas	Now That's What I Call Music! 42	Various artists
2 May	"Why Don't You Get a Job?"	The Offspring	Now That's What I Call Music! 42	Various artists
9 May	"I Want It That Way"	Backstreet Boys	Now That's What I Call Music! 42	Various artists
16 May	"You Needed Me"	Boyzone	The Hush	Texas
23 May	"You Needed Me"	Boyzone	The Hush	Texas
30 May	"That Don't Impress Me Much"	Shania Twain	The Hush	Texas
6 June	"Everybody's Free (To Wear Sunscreen)"	Baz Luhrmann	By Request	Boyzone
13 June	"Bring It All Back"	S Club 7	By Request	Boyzone
20 June	"Boom, Boom, Boom, Boom!!"	Vengaboys	By Request	Boyzone
27 June	"9 PM (Till I Come)"	ATB	Surrender	The Chemical Brothers
4 July	"9 PM (Till I Come)"	ATB	Come On Over	Shania Twain
11 July	"9 PM (Till I Come)"	ATB	By Request	Boyzone
18 July	"Love's Got a Hold on My Heart"	Steps	By Request	Boyzone
25 July	"If Ya Gettin' Down"	Five	Now That's What I Call Music! 43	Various artists
1 August	"When You Say Nothing at All"	Ronan Keating	Now That's What I Call Music! 43	Various artists
8 August	"Better Off Alone"	Alice Deejay	Now That's What I Call Music! 43	Various artists
15 August	"Better Off Alone"	Alice Deejay	The Man Who	Travis
22 August	"Mi Chico Latino"	Geri Halliwell	The Man Who	Travis
29 August	"Mambo No. 5 (A Little Bit Of...)"	Lou Bega	The Man Who	Travis
5 September	"Mambo No. 5 (A Little Bit Of...)"	Lou Bega	The Man Who	Travis
12 September	"We're Going to Ibiza!"	Vengaboys	Come On Over	Shania Twain
19 September	"Blue (Da Ba Dee)"	Eiffel 65	Come On Over	Shania Twain
26 September	"Blue (Da Ba Dee)"	Eiffel 65	Rhythm and Stealth	Leftfield
3 October	"Blue (Da Ba Dee)"	Eiffel 65	Come On Over	Shania Twain
10 October	"2 Times"	Ann Lee	Come On Over	Shania Twain
17 October	"2 Times"	Ann Lee	Come On Over	Shania Twain
24 October	"2 Times"	Ann Lee	Come On Over	Shania Twain
31 October	"Keep On Movin'"	Five	Steptacular	Steps
7 November	"She's the One/It's Only Us"	Robbie Williams	Steptacular	Steps
14 November (Note: Scottish charts were not published on 14 November 1999, therefore a week's gap is inferred.)	"She's the One/It's Only Us"	Robbie Williams	Steptacular	Steps
21 November	"King of My Castle"	Wamdue Project	Steptacular	Steps
28 November	"King of My Castle"	Wamdue Project	Now That's What I Call Music! 44	Various artists
5 December	"The Millennium Prayer"	Cliff Richard	Now That's What I Call Music! 44	Various artists
12 December	"Kiss (When the Sun Don't Shine)"	Vengaboys	Now That's What I Call Music! 44	Various artists
19 December	"I Have a Dream/Seasons in the Sun"	Westlife	Now That's What I Call Music! 44	Various artists
26 December	"I Have a Dream/Seasons in the Sun"	Westlife	The Man Who	Travis

=== 2000 ===
Date	Single	Artist	Album	Artist
2 January	"I Have a Dream/Seasons in the Sun"	Westlife	The Man Who	Travis
9 January	"I Have a Dream/Seasons in the Sun"	Westlife	The Man Who	Travis
16 January	"The Masses Against the Classes"	Manic Street Preachers	The Man Who	Travis
23 January	"Born to Make You Happy"	Britney Spears	Clubber's Guide To... 2000	Various artists
30 January	"The Great Beyond"	R.E.M.	Clubber's Guide To... 2000	Various artists
6 February	"Adelante"	Sash!	XTRMNTR	Primal Scream
13 February	"Go Let It Out"	Oasis	The Man Who	Travis
20 February	"Pure Shores"	All Saints	Rise	Gabrielle
27 February	"Pure Shores"	All Saints	The Beach	Original Soundtrack
5 March	"American Pie"	Madonna	Standing on the Shoulders of Giants	Oasis
12 March	"American Pie"	Madonna	The Man Who	Travis
19 March	"Bag It Up"	Geri Halliwell	The Man Who	Travis
26 March	"Never Be the Same Again"	Melanie C featuring Lisa "Left Eye" Lopes	Play	Moby
2 April	"Fool Again"	Westlife	Play	Moby
9 April	"The Bad Touch"	Bloodhound Gang	Play	Moby
16 April	"Toca's Miracle"	Fragma	Play	Moby
23 April	"Toca's Miracle"	Fragma	Play	Moby
30 April	"Toca's Miracle"	Fragma	Play	Moby
7 May	"Oops!... I Did It Again"	Britney Spears	Play	Moby
14 May	"Don't Call Me Baby"	Madison Avenue	Reload	Tom Jones
21 May	"Day & Night"	Billie Piper	Oops!... I Did It Again	Britney Spears
28 May	"It Feels So Good"	Sonique	Whitney: The Greatest Hits	Whitney Houston
4 June	"It Feels So Good"	Sonique	Crush	Bon Jovi
11 June	"Coming Around"	Travis	Reload	Tom Jones
18 June	"You See the Trouble with Me"	Black Legend	Reload	Tom Jones
25 June	"Spinning Around"	Kylie Minogue	Play	Moby
2 July	"The Real Slim Shady"	Eminem	Alone with Everybody	Richard Ashcroft
9 July	"Breathless"	The Corrs	The Marshall Mathers LP	Eminem
16 July	"Life Is a Rollercoaster"	Ronan Keating	Parachutes	Coldplay
23 July	"Life Is a Rollercoaster"	Ronan Keating	In Blue	The Corrs
30 July	"Life Is a Rollercoaster"	Ronan Keating	In Blue	The Corrs
6 August	"Rock DJ"	Robbie Williams	Ronan	Ronan Keating
13 August	"Rock DJ"	Robbie Williams	Ronan	Ronan Keating
20 August	"Groovejet (If This Ain't Love)"	Spiller featuring Sophie Ellis-Bextor	Born to Do It	Craig David
27 August	"Groovejet (If This Ain't Love)"	Spiller featuring Sophie Ellis-Bextor	Born to Do It	Craig David
3 September	"Take On Me"	A1	Sing When You're Winning	Robbie Williams
10 September	"Lady (Hear Me Tonight)"	Modjo	Sing When You're Winning	Robbie Williams
17 September	"Lady (Hear Me Tonight)"	Modjo	Sing When You're Winning	Robbie Williams
24 September	"Against All Odds"	Mariah Carey and Westlife	Music	Madonna
1 October	"Against All Odds"	Mariah Carey and Westlife	Music	Madonna
8 October	"Silence"	Delerium featuring Sarah McLachlan	Kid A	Radiohead
15 October	"Beautiful Day"	U2	Kid A	Radiohead
22 October	"Stomp"	Steps	Saints & Sinners	All Saints
29 October	"Holler/Let Love Lead the Way"	Spice Girls	The Greatest Hits	Texas
5 November	"My Love"	Westlife	All That You Can't Leave Behind	U2
12 November	"My Love"	Westlife	Coast to Coast	Westlife
19 November	"Can't Fight the Moonlight"	LeAnn Rimes	1	The Beatles
26 November	"Can't Fight the Moonlight"	LeAnn Rimes	1	The Beatles
3 December	"Never Had a Dream Come True"	S Club 7	1	The Beatles
10 December	"Stan"	Eminem	1	The Beatles
17 December	"Can We Fix It?"	Bob the Builder	1	The Beatles
24 December	"Can We Fix It?"	Bob the Builder	1	The Beatles
31 December	"Can We Fix It?"	Bob the Builder	1	The Beatles

=== 2001 ===
Date	Single	Artist	Album	Artist
7 January	"Touch Me"	Rui da Silva featuring Cassandra	1	The Beatles
14 January	"Touch Me"	Rui da Silva featuring Cassandra	Westlife	Westlife
21 January	"Everytime You Need Me"	Fragma featuring Maria Rubia	Chocolate Starfish and the Hot Dog Flavored Water	Limp Bizkit
28 January	"Rollin'"	Limp Bizkit	Chocolate Starfish and the Hot Dog Flavored Water	Limp Bizkit
4 February	"Whole Again"	Atomic Kitten	No Angel	Dido
11 February	"Whole Again"	Atomic Kitten	No Angel	Dido
18 February	"Whole Again"	Atomic Kitten	No Angel	Dido
25 February	"Whole Again"	Atomic Kitten	No Angel	Dido
4 March	"It Wasn't Me"	Shaggy featuring Rikrok	No Angel	Dido
11 March	"Uptown Girl"	Westlife	No Angel	Dido
18 March	"Pure and Simple"	Hear'Say	Songbird	Eva Cassidy
25 March	"Pure and Simple"	Hear'Say	Songbird	Eva Cassidy
1 April	"Pure and Simple"	Hear'Say	Popstars	Hear'Say
8 April	"What Took You So Long?"	Emma Bunton	Popstars	Hear'Say
15 April	"What Took You So Long?"	Emma Bunton	Just Enough Education to Perform	Stereophonics
22 April	"Lovin' Each Day"	Ronan Keating	Just Enough Education to Perform	Stereophonics
29 April	"Don't Stop Movin'"	S Club 7	Just Enough Education to Perform	Stereophonics
6 May	"It's Raining Men"	Geri Halliwell	Survivor	Destiny's Child
13 May	"It's Raining Men"	Geri Halliwell	Survivor	Destiny's Child
20 May	"It's Raining Men"	Geri Halliwell	Reveal	R.E.M.
27 May	"Don't Stop Movin'"	S Club 7	Reveal	R.E.M.
3 June	"Angel"	Shaggy featuring Rayvon	No Angel	Dido
10 June	"Angel"	Shaggy featuring Rayvon	Amnesiac	Radiohead
17 June	"Angel"	Shaggy featuring Rayvon	The Invisible Band	Travis
24 June	"Lady Marmalade"	Christina Aguilera, Lil' Kim, Mýa and Pink	The Invisible Band	Travis
1 July	"The Way to Your Love"	Hear'Say	The Invisible Band	Travis
8 July	"A Little Respect"	Wheatus	The Invisible Band	Travis
15 July	"Castles in the Sky"	Ian Van Dahl	The Invisible Band	Travis
22 July	"Castles in the Sky"	Ian Van Dahl	The Invisible Band	Travis
29 July	"Eternal Flame"	Atomic Kitten	White Ladder	David Gray
5 August	"Eternal Flame"	Atomic Kitten	White Ladder	David Gray
12 August	"Eternal Flame"	Atomic Kitten	Right Now	Atomic Kitten
19 August	"Let's Dance"	Five	White Ladder	David Gray
26 August	"Take Me Home"	Sophie Ellis-Bextor	Break the Cycle	Staind
2 September	"Follow Me"	Uncle Kracker	Iowa	Slipknot
9 September	"Mambo No. 5"	Bob the Builder	A Funk Odyssey	Jamiroquai
16 September	"Hey Baby"	DJ Ötzi	Wonderland	The Charlatans
23 September	"Can't Get You Out of My Head"	Kylie Minogue	The Id	Macy Gray
30 September	"Can't Get You Out of My Head"	Kylie Minogue	The Invisible Band	Travis
7 October	"Can't Get You Out of My Head"	Kylie Minogue	Fever	Kylie Minogue
14 October	"Hey Baby"	DJ Ötzi	Fever	Kylie Minogue
21 October	"Because I Got High"	Afroman	Gold: Greatest Hits	Steps
28 October	"Because I Got High"	Afroman	Gold: Greatest Hits	Steps
4 November	"Because I Got High"	Afroman	Gold: Greatest Hits	Steps
11 November	"Queen of My Heart"	Westlife	Gold: Greatest Hits	Steps
18 November	"Queen of My Heart"	Westlife	World of Our Own	Westlife
25 November	"Have You Ever"	S Club 7	Swing When You're Winning	Robbie Williams
2 December	"Have You Ever"	S Club 7	Swing When You're Winning	Robbie Williams
9 December	"Country Roads"	Hermes House Band	Swing When You're Winning	Robbie Williams
16 December	"Somethin' Stupid"	Robbie Williams and Nicole Kidman	Swing When You're Winning	Robbie Williams
23 December	"Somethin' Stupid"	Robbie Williams and Nicole Kidman	Swing When You're Winning	Robbie Williams
30 December	"Somethin' Stupid"	Robbie Williams and Nicole Kidman	Swing When You're Winning	Robbie Williams

=== 2002 ===
Date	Single	Artist	Album	Artist
6 January	"Country Roads"	Hermes House Band	Swing When You're Winning	Robbie Williams
13 January	"The Whistle Song"	DJ Aligator Project	Just Enough Education to Perform	Stereophonics
20 January	"My Sweet Lord"	George Harrison	Just Enough Education to Perform	Stereophonics
27 January	"Hero"	Enrique Iglesias	Just Enough Education to Perform	Stereophonics
3 February	"Hero"	Enrique Iglesias	Come with Us	The Chemical Brothers
10 February	"Hero"	Enrique Iglesias	Escape	Enrique Iglesias
17 February	"Hero"	Enrique Iglesias	Escape	Enrique Iglesias
24 February	"World of Our Own"	Westlife	Escape	Enrique Iglesias
3 March	"Anything is Possible/Evergreen"	Will Young	The Very Best Of	Sting & The Police
10 March	"Anything is Possible/Evergreen"	Will Young	The Essential Barbra Streisand	Barbra Streisand
17 March	"Anything is Possible/Evergreen"	Will Young	Laundry Service	Shakira
24 March	"Unchained Melody"	Gareth Gates	Silver Side Up	Nickelback
31 March	"Unchained Melody"	Gareth Gates	A New Day Has Come	Céline Dion
7 April	"Unchained Melody"	Gareth Gates	A New Day Has Come	Céline Dion
14 April	"Unchained Melody"	Gareth Gates	C'mon, C'mon	Sheryl Crow
21 April	"The Hindu Times"	Oasis	C'mon, C'mon	Sheryl Crow
28 April	"Freak Like Me"	Sugababes	A New Day Has Come	Céline Dion
5 May	"Kiss Kiss"	Holly Valance	The Last Broadcast	Doves
12 May	"If Tomorrow Never Comes"	Ronan Keating	Escape	Enrique Iglesias
19 May	"If Tomorrow Never Comes"	Ronan Keating	18	Moby
26 May	"Without Me"	Eminem	Destination	Ronan Keating
2 June	"Light My Fire"	Will Young	The Eminem Show	Eminem
9 June	"Light My Fire"	Will Young	The Eminem Show	Eminem
16 June	"A Little Less Conversation"	Elvis vs. JXL	The Eminem Show	Eminem
23 June	"A Little Less Conversation"	Elvis vs. JXL	The Eminem Show	Eminem
30 June	"A Little Less Conversation"	Elvis vs. JXL	The Eminem Show	Eminem
7 July	"A Little Less Conversation"	Elvis vs. JXL	Heathen Chemistry	Oasis
14 July	"Anyone of Us (Stupid Mistake)"	Gareth Gates	By the Way	Red Hot Chili Peppers
21 July	"Anyone of Us (Stupid Mistake)"	Gareth Gates	By the Way	Red Hot Chili Peppers
28 July	"Anyone of Us (Stupid Mistake)"	Gareth Gates	By the Way	Red Hot Chili Peppers
4 August	"Colourblind"	Darius	The Rising	Bruce Springsteen
11 August	"Colourblind"	Darius	By the Way	Red Hot Chili Peppers
18 August	"Round Round"	Sugababes	By the Way	Red Hot Chili Peppers
25 August	"Round Round"	Sugababes	Imagine	Eva Cassidy
1 September	"The Tide Is High (Get the Feeling)"	Atomic Kitten	A Rush of Blood to the Head	Coldplay
8 September	"The Tide Is High (Get the Feeling)"	Atomic Kitten	A Rush of Blood to the Head	Coldplay
15 September	"The Tide Is High (Get the Feeling)"	Atomic Kitten	Feels So Good	Atomic Kitten
22 September	"Just Like a Pill"	Pink	Feels So Good	Atomic Kitten
29 September	"The Long and Winding Road/ Suspicious Minds"	Will Young & Gareth Gates	Elv1s – 30#1 Hits	Elvis Presley
6 October	"The Long and Winding Road/ Suspicious Minds"	Will Young & Gareth Gates	Elv1s – 30#1 Hits	Elvis Presley
13 October	"The Ketchup Song (Aserejé)"	Las Ketchup	From Now On	Will Young
20 October	"Dilemma"	Nelly featuring Kelly Rowland	From Now On	Will Young
27 October	"The Ketchup Song (Aserejé)"	Las Ketchup	One by One	Foo Fighters
3 November	"Heaven"	DJ Sammy & Yanou featuring Do	A New Day At Midnight	David Gray
10 November	"Unbreakable"	Westlife	The Best of 1990–2000	U2
17 November	"Dirrty"	Christina Aguilera featuring Redman	Unbreakable: The Greatest Hits Volume 1	Westlife
24 November	"Dirrty"	Christina Aguilera featuring Redman	Escapology	Robbie Williams
1 December	"We've Got Tonight"	Ronan Keating feat. Lulu	Escapology	Robbie Williams
8 December	"Cheeky Song (Touch My Bum)"	The Cheeky Girls	Escapology	Robbie Williams
15 December	"Sorry Seems to Be the Hardest Word"	Blue featuring Elton John	Escapology	Robbie Williams
22 December	"Sound of the Underground"	Girls Aloud	Escapology	Robbie Williams
29 December	"Sound of the Underground"	Girls Aloud	Escapology	Robbie Williams

=== 2003 ===
Date	Single	Artist	Album	Artist
5 January	"Sound of the Underground"	Girls Aloud	Let Go	Avril Lavigne
12 January	"Danger High Voltage"	Electric Six	Let Go	Avril Lavigne
19 January	"Stop Living the Lie"	David Sneddon	Let Go	Avril Lavigne
26 January	"Stop Living the Lie"	David Sneddon	Let Go	Avril Lavigne
2 February	"All the Things She Said"	T.A.T.u.	Busted	Busted
9 February	"Songbird"	Oasis	Simply Deep	Kelly Rowland
16 February	"I Can't Break Down"	Sinéad Quinn	100th Window	Massive Attack
23 February	"All the Things She Said"	T.A.T.u.	By the Way	Red Hot Chili Peppers
2 March	"The Boys of Summer"	DJ Sammy featuring Loona	Greatest Hits	Tom Jones
9 March	"Beautiful"	Christina Aguilera	Come Away With Me	Norah Jones
16 March	"Spirit in the Sky"	Gareth Gates & The Kumars	Come Away With Me	Norah Jones
23 March	"Spirit in the Sky"	Gareth Gates & The Kumars	Come Away With Me	Norah Jones
30 March	"Make Luv"	Room 5 featuring Oliver Cheatham	Come Away With Me	Norah Jones
6 April	"Make Luv"	Room 5 featuring Oliver Cheatham	Elephant	The White Stripes
13 April	"Make Luv"	Room 5 featuring Oliver Cheatham	Elephant	The White Stripes
20 April	"Make Luv"	Room 5 featuring Oliver Cheatham	Elephant	The White Stripes
27 April	"Don't Let Go"	David Sneddon	American Life	Madonna
4 May	"Loneliness"	Tomcraft	Seven Years - Ten Weeks	David Sneddon
11 May	"Take Your Shoes Off"	The Cheeky Girls	Think Tank	Blur
18 May	"Ignition (Remix)"	R. Kelly	Busted	Busted
25 May	"Ignition (Remix)"	R. Kelly	Justified	Justin Timberlake
1 June	"Say Goodbye / Love Ain't Gonna Wait For You"	S Club	Justified	Justin Timberlake
8 June	"Bring Me to Life"	Evanescence	You Gotta Go There to Come Back	Stereophonics
15 June	"Bring Me to Life"	Evanescence	Hail to the Thief	Radiohead
22 June	"Fast Food Song"	Fast Food Rockers	Fallen	Evanescence
29 June	"Fast Food Song"	Fast Food Rockers	Dangerously in Love	Beyoncé
6 July	"Crazy in Love"	Beyoncé featuring Jay-Z	Dangerously in Love	Beyoncé
13 July	"Crazy in Love"	Beyoncé featuring Jay-Z	Dangerously in Love	Beyoncé
20 July	"Crazy in Love"	Beyoncé featuring Jay-Z	Dangerously in Love	Beyoncé
27 July	"Crazy in Love"	Beyoncé featuring Jay-Z	Dangerously in Love	Beyoncé
3 August	"Something Beautiful"	Robbie Williams	Magic and Medicine	The Coral
10 August	"Pretty Green Eyes"	Ultrabeat	Magic and Medicine	The Coral
17 August	"Pretty Green Eyes"	Ultrabeat	American Tune	Eva Cassidy
24 August	"Pretty Green Eyes"	Ultrabeat	American Tune	Eva Cassidy
31 August	"Are You Ready for Love"	Elton John	Permission to Land	The Darkness
7 September	"Where Is the Love?"	The Black Eyed Peas	Permission to Land	The Darkness
14 September	"Where Is the Love?"	The Black Eyed Peas	Permission to Land	The Darkness
21 September	"Where Is the Love?"	The Black Eyed Peas	Permission to Land	The Darkness
28 September	"Where Is the Love?"	The Black Eyed Peas	Permission to Land	The Darkness
5 October	"Where Is the Love?"	The Black Eyed Peas	Life for Rent	Dido
12 October	"Where Is the Love?"	The Black Eyed Peas	Life for Rent	Dido
19 October	"Hole in the Head"	Sugababes	Life for Rent	Dido
26 October	"Be Faithful"	Fatman Scoop	Rooms on Fire	The Strokes
2 November	"Be Faithful"	Fatman Scoop	In Time: The Best of R.E.M. 1988–2003	R.E.M
9 November	"Slow"	Kylie Minogue	Life for Rent	Dido
16 November	"Crashed the Wedding"	Busted	Life for Rent	Dido
23 November	"Mandy"	Westlife	A Present for Everyone	Busted
30 November	"Leave Right Now"	Will Young	Turnaround	Westlife
7 December	"Leave Right Now"	Will Young	Life for Rent	Dido
14 December	"Changes"	Ozzy Osbourne & Kelly Osbourne	Life for Rent	Dido
21 December	"Mad World"	Michael Andrews featuring Gary Jules	Life for Rent	Dido
28 December	"Mad World"	Michael Andrews featuring Gary Jules	Life for Rent	Dido

=== 2004 ===
Date	Single	Artist	Album	Artist
4 January	"Mad World"	Michael Andrews featuring Gary Jules	Life for Rent	Dido
11 January	"All This Time"	Michelle McManus	Life for Rent	Dido
18 January	"All This Time"	Michelle McManus	Life for Rent	Dido
25 January	"All This Time"	Michelle McManus	Call Off the Search	Katie Melua
1 February	"Take Me to the Clouds Above"	LMC vs. U2	Call Off the Search	Katie Melua
8 February	"Take Me to the Clouds Above"	LMC vs. U2	Call Off the Search	Katie Melua
14 February	"Take Me to the Clouds Above"	LMC vs. U2	Feels Like Home	Norah Jones
21 February	"Take Me to the Clouds Above"	LMC vs. U2	The Meaning of Love	Michelle McManus
29 February	"Mysterious Girl"	Peter Andre	The Meaning of Love	Michelle McManus
7 March	"Toxic"	Britney Spears	Call Off the Search	Katie Melua
14 March	"Cha Cha Slide"	DJ Casper	Call Off the Search	Katie Melua
21 March	"Cha Cha Slide"	DJ Casper	Patience	George Michael
28 March	"Left Outside Alone"	Anastacia	Greatest Hits	Guns N' Roses
4 April	"Five Colours in Her Hair"	McFly	Anastacia	Anastacia
11 April	"Come with Me"	Special D.	Anastacia	Anastacia
18 April	"Fuck It (I Don't Want You Back)"	Eamon	Greatest Hits	Guns N' Roses
25 April	"Fuck It (I Don't Want You Back)"	Eamon	Greatest Hits	Guns N' Roses
2 May	"Fuck It (I Don't Want You Back)"	Eamon	D12 World	D12
9 May	"Fuck It (I Don't Want You Back)"	Eamon	Greatest Hits	Guns N' Roses
16 May	"F.U.R.B. (Fuck You Right Back)"	Frankee	Hopes and Fears	Keane
23 May	"F.U.R.B. (Fuck You Right Back)"	Frankee	Hopes and Fears	Keane
30 May	"F.U.R.B. (Fuck You Right Back)"	Frankee	Hopes and Fears	Keane
6 June	"I Don't Wanna Know"	Mario Winans featuring P. Diddy & Enya	Hopes and Fears	Keane
13 June	"I Don't Wanna Know"	Mario Winans featuring P. Diddy & Enya	Hopes and Fears	Keane
20 June	"Everytime"	Britney Spears	Hopes and Fears	Keane
27 June	"Obviously"	McFly	Scissor Sisters	Scissor Sisters
4 July	"The Show"	Girls Aloud	Scissor Sisters	Scissor Sisters
11 July	"Everytime"	Britney Spears	Scissor Sisters	Scissor Sisters
18 July	"Some Girls"	Rachel Stevens	Scissor Sisters	Scissor Sisters
25 July	"Dry Your Eyes"	The Streets	Scissor Sisters	Scissor Sisters
1 August	"Thunderbirds / 3AM"	Busted	Live in Hyde Park	Red Hot Chili Peppers
8 August	"Thunderbirds / 3AM"	Busted	Final Straw	Snow Patrol
15 August	"Thunderbirds / 3AM"	Busted	Anastacia	Anastacia
22 August	"These Words"	Natasha Bedingfield	Hopes and Fears	Keane
29 August	"These Words"	Natasha Bedingfield	Hopes and Fears	Keane
5 September	"Leave (Get Out)"	JoJo	The Libertines	The Libertines
12 September	"Real to Me"	Brian McFadden	Unwritten	Natasha Bedingfield
19 September	"Call On Me"	Eric Prydz	Out of Nothing	Embrace
26 September	"Call On Me"	Eric Prydz	American Idiot	Green Day
3 October	"Call On Me"	Eric Prydz	American Idiot	Green Day
10 October	"Radio"	Robbie Williams	Around the Sun	R.E.M.
17 October	"Call On Me"	Eric Prydz	10 Years of Hits	Ronan Keating
24 October	"Call On Me"	Eric Prydz	Greatest Hits	Robbie Williams
31 October	"Call On Me"	Eric Prydz	Greatest Hits	Robbie Williams
7 November	"Just Lose It"	Eminem	Il Divo	Il Divo
14 November	"Vertigo"	U2	Greatest Hits - My Prerogative	Britney Spears
21 November	"I'll Stand By You"	Girls Aloud	Encore	Eminem
28 November	"I'll Stand By You"	Girls Aloud	How to Dismantle an Atomic Bomb	U2
5 December	"Do They Know It's Christmas?"	Band Aid 20	How to Dismantle an Atomic Bomb	U2
12 December	"Do They Know It's Christmas?"	Band Aid 20	How to Dismantle an Atomic Bomb	U2
19 December	"Do They Know It's Christmas?"	Band Aid 20	Greatest Hits	Robbie Williams
26 December	"Do They Know It's Christmas?"	Band Aid 20	Greatest Hits	Robbie Williams

=== 2005 ===
Date	Single	Artist	Album	Artist
2 January	"Against All Odds"	Steve Brookstein	American Idiot	Green Day
9 January	"Jailhouse Rock"	Elvis Presley	Hot Fuss	The Killers
16 January	"One Night"	Elvis Presley	Hot Fuss	The Killers
23 January	"(Now and Then There's) A Fool Such as I"	Elvis Presley	Hot Fuss	The Killers
30 January	"It's Now Or Never"	Elvis Presley	Hot Fuss	The Killers
6 February	"Like Toy Soldiers"	Eminem	Tourist	Athlete
13 February	"Sometimes You Can't Make It on Your Own"	U2	Scissor Sisters	Scissor Sisters
20 February	"Get Right"	Jennifer Lopez	Scissor Sisters	Scissor Sisters
27 February	"Over and Over"	Nelly	Some Cities	The Doves
6 March	"Dakota"	Stereophonics	G4	G4
13 March	"All About You/You've Got a Friend"	McFly	The Massacre	50 Cent
20 March	"Is This the Way to Amarillo"	Tony Christie featuring Peter Kay	Language. Sex. Violence. Other?	Stereophonics
27 March	"Is This the Way to Amarillo"	Tony Christie featuring Peter Kay	Definitive Collection	Tony Christie
3 April	"Is This the Way to Amarillo"	Tony Christie featuring Peter Kay	Definitive Collection	Tony Christie
10 April	"Is This the Way to Amarillo"	Tony Christie featuring Peter Kay	Definitive Collection	Tony Christie
17 April	"Is This the Way to Amarillo"	Tony Christie featuring Peter Kay	Definitive Collection	Tony Christie
24 April	"Is This the Way to Amarillo"	Tony Christie featuring Peter Kay	Definitive Collection	Tony Christie
1 May	"Is This the Way to Amarillo"	Tony Christie featuring Peter Kay	Devils and Dust	Bruce Springsteen
8 May	"Lonely"	Akon	Trouble	Akon
15 May	"Lonely"	Akon	Heart and Soul	Steve Brookstein
22 May	"Lyla"	Oasis	Heart and Soul	Steve Brookstein
29 May	"Axel F"	Crazy Frog	Demon Days	Gorillaz
5 June	"Axel F"	Crazy Frog	Don't Believe the Truth	Oasis
12 June	"Axel F"	Crazy Frog	X&Y	Coldplay
19 June	"Axel F"	Crazy Frog	X&Y	Coldplay
26 June	"Ghetto Gospel"	2Pac featuring Elton John	X&Y	Coldplay
3 July	"Ghetto Gospel"	2Pac featuring Elton John	X&Y	Coldplay
10 July	"Ghetto Gospel"	2Pac featuring Elton John	Back to Bedlam	James Blunt
17 July	"You're Beautiful"	James Blunt	Back to Bedlam	James Blunt
24 July	"You're Beautiful"	James Blunt	Back to Bedlam	James Blunt
31 July	"You're Beautiful"	James Blunt	Back to Bedlam	James Blunt
7 August	"You're Beautiful"	James Blunt	Back to Bedlam	James Blunt
14 August	"You're Beautiful"	James Blunt	Back to Bedlam	James Blunt
21 August	"I'll Be OK"	McFly	Back to Bedlam	James Blunt
28 August	"The Importance of Being Idle"	Oasis	Back to Bedlam	James Blunt
5 September	"Bad Day"	Daniel Powter	Wonderland	McFly
12 September	"Don't Cha"	The Pussycat Dolls featuring Busta Rhymes	Eye to the Telescope	KT Tunstall
19 September	"Don't Cha"	The Pussycat Dolls featuring Busta Rhymes	Life In Slow Motion	David Gray
26 September	"Don't Cha"	The Pussycat Dolls featuring Busta Rhymes	Life In Slow Motion	David Gray
3 October	"Push the Button"	Sugababes	Piece By Piece	Katie Melua
9 October	"Push the Button"	Sugababes	You Could Have It So Much Better	Franz Ferdinand
17 October	"Push the Button"	Sugababes	Taller in More Ways	Sugababes
24 October	"I Bet You Look Good On the Dance Floor"	Arctic Monkeys	Their Law: The Singles 1990–2005	The Prodigy
1 November	"You Raise Me Up"	Westlife	Intensive Care	Robbie Williams
18 November	"You Raise Me Up"	Westlife	Face to Face	Westlife
15 November	"Hung Up"	Madonna	Face to Face	Westlife
22 November	"Hung Up"	Madonna	Confessions on a Dance Floor	Madonna
29 November	"Hung Up"	Madonna	Confessions on a Dance Floor	Madonna
6 December	"Let There Be Love"	Oasis	Face to Face	Westlife
13 December	"Hung Up"	Madonna	Curtain Call: The Hits	Eminem
22 December	"JCB song"	Nizlopi	Face to Face	Westlife
29 December	"That's My Goal"	Shayne Ward	Intensive Care	Robbie Williams

=== 2006 ===
Date	Single	Artist	Album	Artist
7 January	"That's My Goal"	Shayne Ward	Curtain Call: The Hits	Eminem
14 January	"That's My Goal"	Shayne Ward	First Impressions of Earth	The Strokes
21 January	"That's My Goal"	Shayne Ward	First Impressions of Earth	The Strokes
28 January	"When the Sun Goes Down"	Arctic Monkeys	Stars of CCTV	Hard-Fi
4 February	"That's My Goal"	Shayne Ward	Whatever People Say I Am, That's What I'm Not	Arctic Monkeys
11 February	"You Spin Me Round (Like a Record)"	Dead Or Alive	Whatever People Say I Am, That's What I'm Not	Arctic Monkeys
18 February	"Thunder In My Heart Again"	Meck	Whatever People Say I Am, That's What I'm Not	Arctic Monkeys
25 February	"Thunder In My Heart Again"	Meck	Whatever People Say I Am, That's What I'm Not	Arctic Monkeys
4 March	"Sorry"	Madonna	Eye to the Telescope	KT Tunstall
11 March	"It's Chico Time"	Chico	Corinne Bailey Rae	Corinne Bailey Rae
18 March	"It's Chico Time"	Chico	On an Island	David Gilmour
25 March	"It's Chico Time"	Chico	In Between Dreams	Jack Johnson
1 April	"Nature's Law"	Embrace	Journey South	Journey South
8 April	"Tribute to Jinky"	Various artists	Ringleader of the Tormentors	Morrissey
15 April	"Crazy"	Gnarls Barkley	The Hardest Way to Make an Easy Living	The Streets
22 April	"Crazy"	Gnarls Barkley	Shayne Ward	Shayne Ward
29 April	"Crazy"	Gnarls Barkley	Shayne Ward	Shayne Ward
6 May	"Crazy"	Gnarls Barkley	Eyes Open	Snow Patrol
13 May	"Crazy"	Gnarls Barkley	Stadium Arcadium	Red Hot Chili Peppers
20 May	"Crazy"	Gnarls Barkley	Stadium Arcadium	Red Hot Chili Peppers
27 May	"Crazy"	Gnarls Barkley	Stadium Arcadium	Red Hot Chili Peppers
3 June	"I Wish I Was a Punk Rocker (With Flowers in My Hair)"	Sandi Thom	Bright Idea	Orson
10 June	"I Wish I Was a Punk Rocker (With Flowers in My Hair)"	Sandi Thom	Smile... It Confuses People	Sandi Thom
17 June	"Scotland Scotland"	Trinidad and Tobago Tartan Army	Under the Iron Sea	Keane
24 June	"I Wish I Was a Punk Rocker (With Flowers in My Hair)"	Sandi Thom	Under the Iron Sea	Keane
1 July	"I Wish I Was a Punk Rocker (With Flowers in My Hair)"	Sandi Thom	Liberation Transmission	LostProphets
8 July	"I Wish I Was a Punk Rocker (With Flowers in My Hair)"	Sandi Thom	Black Holes and Revelations	Muse
15 July	"Last Request"	Paolo Nutini	Inside In/Inside Out	The Kooks
22 July	"Hips Don't Lie"	Shakira & Wyclef Jean	Razorlight	Razorlight
29 July	"Don't Stop Me Now"	McFly	Razorlight	Razorlight
5 August	"Hips Don't Lie"	Shakira & Wyclef Jean	Undiscovered	James Morrison
12 August	"Stars Are Blind"	Paris Hilton	Eyes Open	Snow Patrol
19 August	"Wasted Little DJ's"	The View	Back to Basics	Christina Aguilera
26 August	"Leave Before the Lights Come On"	Arctic Monkeys	Eyes Open	Snow Patrol
2 September	"Hips Don't Lie"	Shakira & Wyclef Jean	Empire	Kasabian
9 September	"SexyBack"	Justin Timberlake	Eyes Open	Snow Patrol
16 September	"I Don't Feel Like Dancin'"	Scissor Sisters	Costello Music	The Fratellis
23 September	"I Don't Feel Like Dancin'"	Scissor Sisters	Ta-Dah	Scissor Sisters
30 September	"I Don't Feel Like Dancin'"	Scissor Sisters	Ta-Dah	Scissor Sisters
7 October	"I Don't Feel Like Dancin'"	Scissor Sisters	Sam's Town	The Killers
14 October	"I Don't Feel Like Dancin'"	Scissor Sisters	Sam's Town	The Killers
21 October	"Welcome to the Black Parade"	My Chemical Romance	Sam's Town	The Killers
28 October	"Welcome to the Black Parade"	My Chemical Romance	Rudebox	Robbie Williams
4 November	"Star Girl"	McFly	The Sound of Girls Aloud: The Greatest Hits	Girls Aloud
11 November	"Put Your Hands Up 4 Detroit"	Fedde le Grand	Angelis	Angelis
18 November	"The Rose"	Westlife	Twenty Five	George Michael
25 November	"The Rose"	Westlife	Stop the Clocks	Oasis
2 December	"Patience"	Take That	Stop the Clocks	Oasis
9 December	"Patience"	Take That	Beautiful World	Take That
16 December	"Patience"	Take That	Beautiful World	Take That
23 December	"Patience"	Take That	Beautiful World	Take That
30 December	"A Moment Like This"	Leona Lewis	Beautiful World	Take That

=== 2007 ===
Date	Single	Artist	Album	Artist
6 January	"A Moment Like This"	Leona Lewis	Beautiful World	Take That
13 January	"A Moment Like This"	Leona Lewis	These Streets	Paolo Nutini
20 January	"A Moment Like This"	Leona Lewis	Costello Music	The Fratellis
27 January	"Same Jeans"	The View	Back to Black	Amy Winehouse
3 February	"Same Jeans"	The View	Hats Off to the Buskers	The View
10 February	"Grace Kelly"	Mika	Hats Off to the Buskers	The View
17 February	"Grace Kelly"	Mika	Life in Cartoon Motion	Mika
24 February	"Grace Kelly"	Mika	Life in Cartoon Motion	Mika
3 March	"Ruby"	Kaiser Chiefs	Life in Cartoon Motion	Mika
10 March	"Shine"	Take That	Yours Truly, Angry Mob	Kaiser Chiefs
17 March	"Saturday Superhouse"	Biffy Clyro	Neon Bible	Arcade Fire
24 March	"Walk This Way"	Sugababes vs. Girls Aloud	Doing It My Way	Ray Quinn
31 March	"I'm Gonna Be (500 Miles)"	The Proclaimers featuring Brian Potter & Andy Pipkin	Beautiful World	Take That
7 April	"I'm Gonna Be (500 Miles)"	The Proclaimers featuring Brian Potter & Andy Pipkin	Everytime We Touch	Cascada
14 April	"I'm Gonna Be (500 Miles)"	The Proclaimers featuring Brian Potter & Andy Pipkin	Macdonald Brothers	The Macdonald Brothers
21 April	"I'm Gonna Be (500 Miles)"	The Proclaimers featuring Brian Potter & Andy Pipkin	Macdonald Brothers	The Macdonald Brothers
28 April	"Brianstorm"	Arctic Monkeys	The Best Damn Thing	Avril Lavigne
5 May	"Closer"	Travis	Favorite Worst Nightmare	Arctic Monkeys
12 May	"Your Love Alone Is Not Enough"	Manic Street Preachers	Favorite Worst Nightmare	Arctic Monkeys
19 May	"Baby's Coming Back"	McFly	The Boy with No Name	Travis
26 May	"Living Is a Problem Because Everything Dies"	Biffy Clyro	Minutes To Midnight	Linkin Park
2 June	"Beautiful Liar"	Shakira & Beyoncé	It Won't Be Soon Before Long	Maroon 5
9 June	"Umbrella"	Rihanna featuring Jay-Z	It Won't Be Soon Before Long	Maroon 5
16 June	"Umbrella"	Rihanna featuring Jay-Z	Puzzle	Biffy Clyro
23 June	"Icky Thump"	The White Stripes	The Traveling Wilburys Collection	Traveling Wilburys
30 June	"Any Dream Will Do"	Lee Mead	Icky Thump	The White Stripes
7 July	"Umbrella"	Rihanna featuring Jay-Z	An End Has a Start	Editors
14 July	"Umbrella"	Rihanna featuring Jay-Z	The Traveling Wilburys Collection	Traveling Wilburys
21 July	"Clean Up Your Eyes"	The Dykeenies	We'll Live and Die in These Towns	The Enemy
28 July	"Mr Rock & Roll"	Amy Macdonald	One Chance	Paul Potts
4 August	"The Way I Are"	Timbaland featuring Keri Hilson	One Chance	Paul Potts
11 August	"The Way I Are"	Timbaland featuring Keri Hilson	This Is the Life	Amy Macdonald
18 August	"With Every Heartbeat"	Robyn & Kleerup	This Is the Life	Amy Macdonald
25 August	"With Every Heartbeat"	Robyn & Kleerup	This Is the Life	Amy Macdonald
1 September	"With Every Heartbeat"	Robyn & Kleerup	This Is the Life	Amy Macdonald
8 September	"Beautiful Girls"	Sean Kingston	This Is the Life	Amy Macdonald
15 September	"Beautiful Girls"	Sean Kingston	Life with You	The Proclaimers
22 September	"Beautiful Girls"	Sean Kingston	Drastic Fantastic	KT Tunstall
29 September	"Beautiful Girls"	Sean Kingston	All the Lost Souls	James Blunt
6 October	"No U Hang Up"	Shayne Ward	Echoes, Silence, Patience & Grace	Foo Fighters
13 October	"About You Now"	Sugababes	Magic	Bruce Springsteen
20 October	"About You Now"	Sugababes	Change	Sugababes
27 October	"About You Now"	Sugababes	Pull the Pin	Stereophonics
3 November	"Bleeding Love"	Leona Lewis	The Trick to Life	The Hoosiers
10 November	"Bleeding Love"	Leona Lewis	Long Road Out of Eden	The Eagles
17 November	"Bleeding Love"	Leona Lewis	Back Home	Westlife
24 November	"Loch Lomond"	Runrig featuring Tartan Army	Spirit	Leona Lewis
1 December	"Loch Lomond"	Runrig featuring Tartan Army	Spirit	Leona Lewis
8 December	"Loch Lomond"	Runrig featuring Tartan Army	Spirit	Leona Lewis
15 December	"Loch Lomond"	Runrig featuring Tartan Army	Spirit	Leona Lewis
22 December	"What a Wonderful World"	Eva Cassidy featuring Katie Melua	Spirit	Leona Lewis
29 December	"When You Believe"	Leon Jackson	Spirit	Leona Lewis

=== 2008 ===
Date	Single	Artist	Album	Artist
5 January	"When You Believe"	Leon Jackson	Spirit	Leona Lewis
12 January	"When You Believe"	Leon Jackson	This is the Life	Amy Macdonald
19 January	"When You Believe"	Leon Jackson	This is the Life	Amy Macdonald
26 January	"Now You're Gone"	Basshunter	This is the Life	Amy Macdonald
2 February	"Now You're Gone"	Basshunter	This is the Life	Amy Macdonald
9 February	"Young Free & Simple"	Urbnri	19	Adele
16 February	"Weightless"	Wet Wet Wet	Sleep Through the Static	Jack Johnson
23 February	"Now You're Gone"	Basshunter	All the Right Reasons	Nickelback
1 March	"Now You're Gone"	Basshunter	All the Right Reasons	Nickelback
8 March	"Mercy"	Duffy	Back to Black	Amy Winehouse
15 March	"Mercy"	Duffy	Rockferry	Duffy
22 March	"Better in Time"	Leona Lewis	Rockferry	Duffy
29 March	"Better in Time"	Leona Lewis	Rockferry	Duffy
5 April	"American Boy"	Estelle featuring Kanye West	Rockferry	Duffy
12 April	"American Boy"	Estelle featuring Kanye West	Accelerate	R.E.M.
19 April	"Parallel Worlds"	Elliot Minor	Rockferry	Duffy
26 April	"Black and Gold"	Sam Sparro	Konk	The Kooks
3 May	"4 Minutes"	Madonna featuring Justin Timberlake	The Age of the Understatement	Last Shadow Puppets
10 May	"4 Minutes"	Madonna featuring Justin Timberlake	Hard Candy	Madonna
17 May	"God"	Attic Lights	Jumping All Over the World	Scooter
24 May	"That's Not My Name"	The Ting Tings	Jumping All Over the World	Scooter
31 May	"Take a Bow"	Rihanna	Jumping All Over the World	Scooter
7 June	"Take a Bow"	Rihanna	Jumping All Over the World	Scooter
14 June	"All You Need Is Me"	Morrissey	Home Before Dark	Neil Diamond
21 June	"Chick Lit"	We Are Scientists	Viva la Vida or Death and All His Friends	Coldplay
28 June	"Back Me Up"	Urbnri	Viva la Vida or Death and All His Friends	Coldplay
5 July	"Geraldine"	Glasvegas	Viva la Vida or Death and All His Friends	Coldplay
12 July	"Closer"	Ne-Yo	Viva la Vida or Death and All His Friends	Coldplay
19 July	"All I Ever Wanted"	Basshunter	Viva la Vida or Death and All His Friends	Coldplay
26 July	"One for the Radio"	McFly	Now You're Gone – The Album	Basshunter
2 August	"All Summer Long"	Kid Rock	Now You're Gone – The Album	Basshunter
9 August	"All Summer Long"	Kid Rock	Now You're Gone – The Album	Basshunter
16 August	"All Summer Long"	Kid Rock	Gold: Greatest Hits	ABBA
23 August	"Love Is Noise"	The Verve	The Script	The Script
30 August	"Look Out Sunshine!"	The Fratellis	The Script	The Script
6 September	"Mountains"	Biffy Clyro	Forth	The Verve
13 September	"I Kissed a Girl"	Katy Perry	Forth	The Verve
20 September	"Thank You for a Lifetime"	Cliff Richard	Glasvegas	Glasvegas
27 September	"Lies"	McFly	Glasvegas	Glasvegas
4 October	"Last Goodbye"	Avenue	Only by the Night	Kings of Leon
11 October	"The Shock of the Lightning"	Oasis	Only by the Night	Kings of Leon
18 October	"So What"	Pink	Dig Out Your Soul	Oasis
25 October	"Don't Call This Love"	Leon Jackson	Dig Out Your Soul	Oasis
1 November	"Don't Call This Love"	Leon Jackson	Black Ice	AC/DC
8 November	"Hero"	The X Factor finalists	Funhouse	Pink
15 November	"Hero"	The X Factor finalists	Out of Control	Girls Aloud
22 November	"Hero"	The X Factor finalists	Decade in the Sun: Best of Stereophonics	Stereophonics
29 November	"Hero"	The X Factor finalists	Decade in the Sun: Best of Stereophonics	Stereophonics
6 December	"Hero"	The X Factor finalists	Day & Age	The Killers
13 December	"I'm Outta Time"	Oasis	The Circus	Take That
20 December	"Peace on Earth/Little Drummer Boy"	Bandaged	The Circus	Take That
27 December	"Hallelujah"	Alexandra Burke	The Circus	Take That

=== 2009 ===
Date	Single	Artist	Album	Artist
3 January	"Hallelujah"	Alexandra Burke	The Circus	Take That
10 January	"Hallelujah"	Alexandra Burke	The Circus	Take That
17 January	"Hallelujah"	Alexandra Burke	Only by the Night	Kings Of Leon
24 January	"Hallelujah"	Alexandra Burke	Only by the Night	Kings Of Leon
31 January	"Hallelujah"	Alexandra Burke	The Fame	Lady Gaga
7 February	"Hallelujah"	Alexandra Burke	Working on a Dream	Bruce Springsteen
14 February	"Hallelujah"	Alexandra Burke	Which Bitch?	The View
21 February	"I'm Throwing My Arms Around Paris"	Morrissey	It's Not Me It's You	Lily Allen
28 February	"Get On Your Boots"	U2	Only By The Night	Kings Of Leon
7 March	"Flowers & Football Tops"	Glasvegas	Invaders Must Die	The Prodigy
14 March	"Just Can't Get Enough"	The Saturdays	No Line On The Horizon	U2
21 March	"Barry Islands in the Stream"	Vanessa Jenkins & Bryn West featuring Sir Tom Jones & Robin Gibb	No Line On The Horizon	U2
28 March	"Barry Islands in the Stream"	Vanessa Jenkins & Bryn West featuring Sir Tom Jones & Robin Gibb	Songs For My Mother	Ronan Keating
4 April	"The Haggis"	Clax	Songs For My Mother	Ronan Keating
11 April	"Right Round"	Flo Rida featuring Kesha	The Fame	Lady Gaga
18 April	"Wrong"	Depeche Mode	The Fame	Lady Gaga
25 April	"Poker Face"	Lady Gaga	The Fame	Lady Gaga
2 May	"The Fields of Anfield Road"	Liverpool Collective	The Fame	Lady Gaga
9 May	"Something Is Squeezing My Skull"	Morrissey	Together Through Life	Bob Dylan
16 May	"Magnificent"	U2	Together Through Life	Bob Dylan
23 May	"We Made You"	Eminem	21st Century Breakdown	Green Day
30 May	"Candy"	Paolo Nutini	Relapse	Eminem
6 June	"Candy"	Paolo Nutini	Relapse	Eminem
13 June	"Fire"	Kasabian	Sunny Side Up	Paolo Nutini
20 June	"The Winner's Song"	Geraldine McQueen	Sunny Side Up	Paolo Nutini
27 June	"Said It All"	Take That	Sunny Side Up	Paolo Nutini
4 July	"Jackets"	Tommy Reilly	Sunny Side Up	Paolo Nutini
11 July	"Evacuate the Dancefloor"	Cascada	Sunny Side Up	Paolo Nutini
18 July	"Paparazzi"	Lady Gaga	The Essential	Michael Jackson
25 July	"Beat Again"	JLS	The Essential	Michael Jackson
1 August	"Beat Again"	JLS	The Essential	Michael Jackson
8 August	"Beat Again"	JLS	Sunny Side Up	Paolo Nutini
15 August	"Beat Again"	JLS	Sunny Side Up	Paolo Nutini
22 August	"I Gotta Feeling"	The Black Eyed Peas	Sunny Side Up	Paolo Nutini
29 August	"I Gotta Feeling"	The Black Eyed Peas	Ready for the Weekend	Calvin Harris
5 September	"That Golden Rule"	Biffy Clyro	Humbug	Arctic Monkeys
12 September	"I Gotta Feeling"	The Black Eyed Peas	Sunny Side Up	Paolo Nutini
19 September	"I'll Go Crazy If I Don't Go Crazy Tonight"	U2	Sunny Side Up	Paolo Nutini
26 September	"Celebration"	Madonna	The Resistance	Muse
3 October	"Celebration"	Madonna	Celebration	Madonna
10 October	"Celebration"	Madonna	Brand New Eyes	Paramore
17 October	"Oopsy Daisy"	Chipmunk featuring Ms D	Brand New Eyes	Paramore
24 October	"Bad Boys"	Alexandra Burke featuring Flo Rida	Sunny Side Up	Paolo Nutini
31 October	"Fight for This Love"	Cheryl Cole	Overcome	Alexandra Burke
7 November	"Fight for This Love"	Cheryl Cole	3 Words	Cheryl Cole
14 November	"Everybody in Love"	JLS	Crazy Love	Michael Bublé
21 November	"Meet Me Halfway"	The Black Eyed Peas	Reality Killed the Video Star	Robbie Williams
28 November	"You Are Not Alone"	The X Factor finalists	Echo	Leona Lewis
5 December	"The Official BBC Children in Need Medley"	Peter Kay's Animated All-Star Band	I Dreamed a Dream	Susan Boyle
12 December	"The Official BBC Children in Need Medley"	Peter Kay's Animated All-Star Band	I Dreamed a Dream	Susan Boyle
19 December	"Bad Romance"	Lady Gaga	I Dreamed a Dream	Susan Boyle
26 December	"The Climb"	Joe McElderry	I Dreamed a Dream	Susan Boyle

=== 2010 ===
Date	Single	Artist	Album	Artist
2 January	"The Climb"	Joe McElderry	I Dreamed a Dream	Susan Boyle
9 January	"Bad Romance"	Lady Gaga	Sunny Side Up	Paolo Nutini
16 January	"Riverside (Let's Go!)"	Sidney Samson featuring Wizard Sleeve	Sunny Side Up	Paolo Nutini
23 January	"Replay"	Iyaz	Sunny Side Up	Paolo Nutini
30 January	"Fireflies"	Owl City	Sunny Side Up	Paolo Nutini
6 February	"Fireflies"	Owl City	Sunny Side Up	Paolo Nutini
13 February	"Fireflies"	Owl City	Sunny Side Up	Paolo Nutini
20 February	"Everybody Hurts"	Helping Haiti	Sunny Side Up	Paolo Nutini
27 February	"Everybody Hurts"	Helping Haiti	Glee: The Music, Volume 1	Glee cast
6 March	"In My Head"	Jason Derulo	Glee: The Music, Volume 1	Glee cast
13 March	"Pass Out"	Tinie Tempah	Glee: The Music, Volume 1	Glee cast
20 March	"Baby"	Justin Bieber featuring Ludacris	Brother	Boyzone
27 March	"Telephone"	Lady Gaga featuring Beyoncé	Glee: The Music, Volume 2	Glee cast
3 April	"Telephone"	Lady Gaga featuring Beyoncé	Brother	Boyzone
10 April	"This Ain't A Love Song"	Scouting for Girls	Brother	Boyzone
17 April	"This Ain't A Love Song"	Scouting for Girls	Brother	Boyzone
24 April	"This Ain't A Love Song"	Scouting for Girls	The Defamation of Strickland Banks	Plan B
1 May	"The Best"	Tina Turner	Iron Man 2	AC/DC
8 May	"Good Times"	Roll Deep	Iron Man 2	AC/DC
15 May	"Good Times"	Roll Deep	Iron Man 2	AC/DC
22 May	"Good Times"	Roll Deep	Iron Man 2	AC/DC
29 May	"Nothin' on You"	B.o.B featuring Bruno Mars	Exile on Main Street	Rolling Stones
5 June	"Dirtee Disco"	Dizzee Rascal	Glee: The Music, Volume 3	Glee cast
12 June	"Gettin' Over You"	David Guetta featuring Willis, Fergie & LMFAO	Glee: The Music, Volume 3	Glee cast
19 June	"Frisky"	Tinie Tempah featuring Labrinth	Glee: The Music, Volume 3	Glee cast
26 June	"Wavin' Flag"	K'naan	Time Flies... 1994–2009	Oasis
3 July	"California Gurls"	Katy Perry featuring Snoop Dogg	Recovery	Eminem
10 July	"California Gurls"	Katy Perry featuring Snoop Dogg	Recovery	Eminem
17 July	"The Club Is Alive"	JLS	Aphrodite	Kylie Minogue
24 July	"Airplanes"	B.o.B featuring Hayley Williams	Recovery	Eminem
31 July	"We No Speak Americano"	Yolanda Be Cool vs. DCUP	Recovery	Eminem
7 August	"All Time Low"	The Wanted	Recovery	Eminem
14 August	"Club Can't Handle Me"	Flo Rida featuring David Guetta	The Suburbs	Arcade Fire
21 August	"Club Can't Handle Me"	Flo Rida featuring David Guetta	Recovery	Eminem
28 August	"Green Light"	Roll Deep	The Final Frontier	Iron Maiden
4 September	"Dynamite"	Taio Cruz	Recovery	Eminem
11 September	"Teenage Dream"	Katy Perry	Teenage Dream	Katy Perry
18 September	"Start Without You"	Alexandra Burke featuring Laza Morgan	Flamingo	Brandon Flowers
25 September	"Start Without You"	Alexandra Burke featuring Laza Morgan	Science & Faith	The Script
2 October	"Just The Way You Are"	Bruno Mars	Science & Faith	The Script
9 October	"Written In The Stars"	Tinie Tempah featuring Eric Turner	Science & Faith	The Script
16 October	"Forget You"	Cee Lo Green	Disc-Overy	Tinie Tempah
23 October	"Barbra Streisand"	Duck Sauce	Greatest Hits 1990–2010	Robbie Williams
30 October	"Just the Way You Are"	Bruno Mars	Come Around Sundown	Kings of Leon
6 November	"Promise This"	Cheryl Cole	Come Around Sundown	Kings of Leon
13 November	"Only Girl (In the World)"	Rihanna	Greatest Hits	Bon Jovi
20 November	"Only Girl (In the World)"	Rihanna	The Gift	Susan Boyle
27 November	"Love You More"	JLS	Progress	Take That
4 December	"Heroes"	The X Factor finalists	Progress	Take That
11 December	"Poison"	Nicole Scherzinger	Progress	Take That
18 December	"The Time (Dirty Bit)"	The Black Eyed Peas	Progress	Take That
25 December	"When We Collide"	Matt Cardle	Progress	Take That

=== 2011 ===
Chart date (week ending)	Song	Artist(s)	Sales	References
1 January	"When We Collide"	Matt Cardle	Progress	Take That
8 January	"When We Collide"	Matt Cardle	Loud	Rihanna
15 January	"What's My Name?"	Rihanna featuring Drake	Loud	Rihanna
22 January	"Grenade"	Bruno Mars	Loud	Rihanna
29 January	"Grenade"	Bruno Mars	Doo-Wops & Hooligans	Bruno Mars
5 February	"We R Who We R"	Kesha	21	Adele
12 February	"Price Tag"	Jessie J featuring B.o.B	21	Adele
19 February	"Price Tag"	Jessie J featuring B.o.B	21	Adele
26 February	"Born This Way"	Lady Gaga	21	Adele
5 March	"Someone Like You"	Adele	21	Adele
12 March	"Someone Like You"	Adele	21	Adele
19 March	"Someone Like You"	Adele	21	Adele
26 March	"Don't Hold Your Breath"	Nicole Scherzinger	21	Adele
2 April	"Someone Like You"	Adele	21	Adele
9 April	"On the Floor"	Jennifer Lopez featuring Pitbull	21	Adele
16 April	"On the Floor"	Jennifer Lopez featuring Pitbull	21	Adele
23 April	"Party Rock Anthem"	LMFAO featuring Lauren Bennett and GoonRock	Wasting Light	Foo Fighters
30 April	"Party Rock Anthem"	LMFAO featuring Lauren Bennett and GoonRock	21	Adele
7 May	"Party Rock Anthem"	LMFAO featuring Lauren Bennett and GoonRock	21	Adele
14 May	"Where Them Girls At"	David Guetta featuring Flo Rida and Nicki Minaj	21	Adele
21 May	"Where Them Girls At"	David Guetta featuring Flo Rida and Nicki Minaj	21	Adele
28 May	"Give Me Everything"	Pitbull featuring Ne-Yo, Afrojack and Nayer	21	Adele
4 June	"Give Me Everything"	Pitbull featuring Ne-Yo, Afrojack and Nayer	Born This Way	Lady Gaga
11 June	"Give Me Everything"	Pitbull featuring Ne-Yo, Afrojack and Nayer	Born This Way	Lady Gaga
18 June	"Changed the Way You Kiss Me"	Example	Suck It and See	Arctic Monkeys
25 June	"Bounce"	Calvin Harris featuring Kelis	Progress	Take That
2 July	"Don't Wanna Go Home"	Jason Derulo	Born This Way	Lady Gaga
9 July	"Don't Wanna Go Home"	Jason Derulo	4	Beyoncé
16 July	"Louder"	DJ Fresh featuring Sian Evans	21	Adele
23 July	"Glad You Came"	The Wanted	21	Adele
30 July	"Glad You Came"	The Wanted	21	Adele
6 August	"She Makes Me Wanna"	JLS featuring Dev	21	Adele
13 August	"Swagger Jagger"	Cher Lloyd	Back To Black	Amy Winehouse
20 August	"Promises"	Nero	Back To Black	Amy Winehouse
27 August	"Moves Like Jagger"	Maroon 5 featuring Christina Aguilera	21	Adele
3 September	"Feel So Close"	Calvin Harris	Echoes	Will Young
10 September	"Moves Like Jagger"	Maroon 5 featuring Christina Aguilera	Nothing but the Beat	David Guetta
17 September	"All About Tonight"	Pixie Lott	21	Adele
24 September	"What Makes You Beautiful"	One Direction	+	Ed Sheeran
1 October	"No Regrets"	Dappy	Velociraptor!	Kasabian
8 October	"Loca People"	Sak Noel	The Awakening	James Morrison
15 October	"We Found Love"	Rihanna featuring Calvin Harris	The Awakening	James Morrison
22 October	"We Found Love"	Rihanna featuring Calvin Harris	The Ultimate Collection	Steps
29 October	"We Found Love"	Rihanna featuring Calvin Harris	Noel Gallagher's High Flying Birds	Noel Gallagher's High Flying Birds
5 November	"Read All About It"	Professor Green featuring Emeli Sandé	Mylo Xyloto	Coldplay
12 November	"Read All About It"	Professor Green featuring Emeli Sandé	Ceremonials	Florence and the Machine
19 November	"We Found Love"	Rihanna featuring Calvin Harris	Someone to Watch Over Me	Susan Boyle
26 November	"Good Feeling"	Flo Rida	Fallen Empires	Snow Patrol
3 December	"Levels"	Avicii	Talk That Talk	Rihanna
10 December	"Wishing on a Star"	The X Factor finalists featuring JLS and One Direction	Christmas	Michael Bublé
17 December	"Dance with Me Tonight"	Olly Murs	Christmas	Michael Bublé
24 December	"Cannonball"	Little Mix	Christmas	Michael Bublé
31 December	"Wherever You Are"	Military Wives with Gareth Malone	Christmas	Michael Bublé

=== 2012 ===
Date	Single	Artist	Album	Artist
7 January	"Paradise"	Coldplay	Mylo Xyloto	Coldplay
14 January	"Good Feeling"	Flo Rida	21	Adele
21 January	"Domino"	Jessie J	21	Adele
28 January	"Domino"	Jessie J	21	Adele
4 February	"Titanium"	David Guetta featuring Sia	21	Adele
11 February	"Titanium"	David Guetta featuring Sia	Born to Die	Lana Del Rey
18 February	"Titanium"	David Guetta featuring Sia	Born to Die	Lana Del Rey
25 February	"Next To Me"	Emeli Sandé	Our Version of Events	Emeli Sandé
3 March	"Somebody That I Used to Know"	Gotye featuring Kimbra	Our Version of Events	Emeli Sandé
10 March	"Somebody That I Used to Know"	Gotye featuring Kimbra	Our Version of Events	Emeli Sandé
17 March	"Starships"	Nicki Minaj	Wrecking Ball	Bruce Springsteen
24 March	"Starships"	Nicki Minaj	Our Version of Events	Emeli Sandé
31 March	"Part of Me"	Katy Perry	Nothing but the Beat	David Guetta
7 April	"Turn Up the Music"	Chris Brown	MDNA	Madonna
14 April	"Call Me Maybe"	Carly Rae Jepsen	Pink Friday: Roman Reloaded	Nicki Minaj
21 April	"Call Me Maybe"	Carly Rae Jepsen	Pink Friday: Roman Reloaded	Nicki Minaj
28 April	"Call Me Maybe"	Carly Rae Jepsen	21	Adele
5 May	"Call Me Maybe"	Carly Rae Jepsen	Blunderbuss	Jack White
12 May	"Young"	Tulisa	Electra Heart	Marina and the Diamonds
19 May	"R.I.P."	Rita Ora featuring Tinie Tempah	Strangeland	Keane
26 May	"We Are Young"	fun. featuring Janelle Monáe	Strangeland	Keane
2 June	"Chasing the Sun"	The Wanted	Mid Air	Paul Buchanan
9 June	"Feel the Love"	Rudimental featuring John Newman	Fall to Grace	Paloma Faith
16 June	"Whistle"	Flo Rida	Sing	Gary Barlow & The Commonwealth Band
23 June	"Call My Name"	Cheryl Cole	Life in a Beautiful Light	Amy Macdonald
30 June	"Payphone"	Maroon 5 featuring Wiz Khalifa	A Million Lights	Cheryl Cole
7 July	"This Is Love"	will.i.am featuring Eva Simons	Overexposed	Maroon 5
14 July	"Don't Wake Me Up"	Chris Brown	Overexposed	Maroon 5
21 July	"Spectrum"	Florence and the Machine & Calvin Harris	Cheeky for a Reason	The View
28 July	"Spectrum"	Florence and the Machine & Calvin Harris	Cheeky for a Reason	The View
4 August	"Spectrum"	Florence and the Machine & Calvin Harris	Handwritten	The Gaslight Anthem
11 August	"We'll Be Coming Back"	Calvin Harris featuring Example	Our Version of Events	Emeli Sandé
18 August	"Heatwave"	Wiley featuring Ms D	Life in a Beautiful Light	Amy Macdonald
25 August	"How We Do (Party)"	Rita Ora	Our Version of Events	Emeli Sandé
1 September	"Bom Bom"	Sam and the Womp	Fall to Grace	Paloma Faith
8 September	"Wings"	Little Mix	Ora	Rita Ora
15 September	"Blow Me (One Last Kiss)"	Pink	Come of Age	The Vaccines
22 September	"Hall of Fame"	The Script featuring will.i.am	#3	The Script
29 September	"Hall of Fame"	The Script featuring will.i.am	Battle Born	The Killers
6 October	"Gangnam Style"	PSY	Babel	Mumford & Sons
13 October	"Diamonds"	Rihanna	The 2nd Law	Muse
20 October	"Don't You Worry Child"	Swedish House Mafia featuring John Martin	Babel	Mumford & Sons
27 October	"Sweet Nothing"	Calvin Harris featuring Florence Welch	Jake Bugg	Jake Bugg
3 November	"Beneath Your Beautiful"	Labrinth featuring Emeli Sandé	Red	Taylor Swift
10 November	"Candy"	Robbie Williams	18 Months	Calvin Harris
17 November	"Candy"	Robbie Williams	Take the Crown	Robbie Williams
24 November	"Little Things"	One Direction	Take Me Home	One Direction
1 December	"Troublemaker"	Olly Murs featuring Flo Rida	Standing Ovation: The Greatest Songs from the Stage	Susan Boyle
8 December	"Troublemaker"	Olly Murs featuring Flo Rida	Right Place Right Time	Olly Murs
15 December	"Troublemaker"	Olly Murs featuring Flo Rida	Right Place Right Time	Olly Murs
22 December	"Impossible"	James Arthur	The Very Best of	Neil Diamond
29 December	"Impossible"	James Arthur	Our Version of Events	Emeli Sandé

=== 2013 ===
Date	Single	Artist	Album	Artist
6 January	"Scream & Shout"	will.i.am featuring Britney Spears	18 Months	Calvin Harris
13 January	"Scream & Shout"	will.i.am featuring Britney Spears	18 Months	Calvin Harris
20 January	"Scream & Shout"	will.i.am featuring Britney Spears	Les Misérables	Motion Picture Cast Recording
27 January	"Get Up (Rattle)"	Bingo Players featuring Far East Movement	Les Misérables	Motion Picture Cast Recording
3 February	"Get Up (Rattle)"	Bingo Players featuring Far East Movement	Opposites	Biffy Clyro
10 February	"Thrift Shop"	Macklemore & Ryan Lewis featuring Wanz	Opposites	Biffy Clyro
17 February	"I Could Be the One"	Avicii & Nicky Romero	Our Version of Events	Emeli Sandé
24 February	"One Way or Another (Teenage Kicks)"	One Direction	Our Version of Events	Emeli Sandé
3 March	"Pompeii"	Bastille	Our Version of Events	Emeli Sandé
10 March	"Pompeii"	Bastille	Our Version of Events	Emeli Sandé
17 March	"Just Give Me a Reason"	Pink featuring Nate Ruess	The Next Day	David Bowie
24 March	"What About Us"	The Saturdays featuring Sean Paul	The 20/20 Experience	Justin Timberlake
31 March	"What About Us"	The Saturdays featuring Sean Paul	The 20/20 Experience	Justin Timberlake
7 April	"Need U (100%)"	Duke Dumont featuring A*M*E	Night Visions	Imagine Dragons
14 April	"Ding-Dong! The Witch Is Dead"	Cast of The Wizard of Oz	Paramore	Paramore
21 April	"#thatPower"	will.i.am featuring Justin Bieber	To Be Loved	Michael Bublé
28 April	"Get Lucky"	Daft Punk featuring Pharrell Williams & Nile Rodgers	To Be Loved	Michael Bublé
5 May	"Get Lucky"	Daft Punk featuring Pharrell Williams & Nile Rodgers	Home	Rudimental
12 May	"Get Lucky"	Daft Punk featuring Pharrell Williams & Nile Rodgers	The Shocking Miss Emerald	Caro Emerald
19 May	"Get Lucky"	Daft Punk featuring Pharrell Williams & Nile Rodgers	Time	Rod Stewart
26 May	"Get Lucky"	Daft Punk featuring Pharrell Williams & Nile Rodgers	Random Access Memories	Daft Punk
2 June	"Blurred Lines"	Robin Thicke featuring T.I. & Pharrell Williams	Random Access Memories	Daft Punk
9 June	"Blurred Lines"	Robin Thicke featuring T.I. & Pharrell Williams	...Like Clockwork	Queens of the Stone Age
16 June	"Blurred Lines"	Robin Thicke featuring T.I. & Pharrell Williams	BE	Beady Eye
23 June	"Blurred Lines"	Robin Thicke featuring T.I. & Pharrell Williams	Time	Rod Stewart
30 June	"I Love It"	Icona Pop featuring Charli XCX	Long Way Down	Tom Odell
7 July	"Love Me Again"	John Newman	To Be Loved	Michael Bublé
14 July	"Reload"	Sebastian Ingrosso featuring Tommy Trash and John Martin	Magna Carta... Holy Grail	Jay-Z
21 July	"Wake Me Up!"	Avicii	Blurred Lines	Robin Thicke
28 July	"Wake Me Up!"	Avicii	Love Never Fails	Jahméne Douglas
4 August	"Wake Me Up!"	Avicii	The Impossible Dream	Richard & Adam
11 August	"We Can't Stop"	Miley Cyrus	The Impossible Dream	Richard & Adam
18 August	"Burn"	Ellie Goulding	The Impossible Dream	Richard & Adam
25 August	"Burn"	Ellie Goulding	Where You Stand	Travis
1 September	"Burn"	Ellie Goulding	Hail to the King	Avenged Sevenfold
8 September	"Roar"	Katy Perry	The 1975	The 1975
15 September	"Roar"	Katy Perry	AM	Arctic Monkeys
22 September	"Talk Dirty"	Jason Derulo featuring 2 Chainz	AM	Arctic Monkeys
29 September	"Counting Stars"	OneRepublic	Mechanical Bull	Kings of Leon
6 October	"Counting Stars"	OneRepublic	Mechanical Bull	Kings of Leon
13 October	"Wrecking Ball"	Miley Cyrus	Bangerz	Miley Cyrus
20 October	"Counting Stars"	OneRepublic	Tribute	John Newman
27 October	"Royals"	Lorde	Prism	Katy Perry
3 November	"Eat, Sleep, Rave, Repeat"	Fatboy Slim & Riva Starr featuring Beardyman	Reflektor	Arcade Fire
10 November	"The Monster"	Eminem featuring Rihanna	The Marshall Mathers LP 2	Eminem
17 November	"Animals"	Martin Garrix	Artpop	Lady Gaga
24 November	"Let Me Go"	Gary Barlow	Swings Both Ways	Robbie Williams
1 December	"Under Control"	Calvin Harris & Alesso featuring Hurts	Midnight Memories	One Direction
8 December	"Under Control"	Calvin Harris & Alesso featuring Hurts	Midnight Memories	One Direction
15 December	"Hey Brother"	Avicii	Midnight Memories	One Direction
22 December	"Skyscraper"	Sam Bailey	Midnight Memories	One Direction
29 December	"Hey Brother"	Avicii	Since I Saw You Last	Gary Barlow

=== 2014 ===
Date	Single	Artist	Album	Artist
5 January	"Timber"	Pitbull featuring Kesha	Halcyon	Ellie Goulding
12 January	"Timber"	Pitbull featuring Kesha	Halcyon	Ellie Goulding
19 January	"Timber"	Pitbull featuring Kesha	High Hopes	Bruce Springsteen
26 January	"Rather Be"	Clean Bandit featuring Jess Glynne	High Hopes	Bruce Springsteen
2 February	"Rather Be"	Clean Bandit featuring Jess Glynne	Cavalier Youth	You Me at Six
9 February	"Rather Be"	Clean Bandit featuring Jess Glynne	True	Avicii
16 February	"Stay the Night"	Zedd featuring Hayley Williams	Little Red	Katy B
23 February	"Money on My Mind"	Sam Smith	Peroxide	Nina Nesbitt
2 March	"Red Lights"	Tiësto	Bad Blood	Bastille
9 March	"My Love"	Route 94 featuring Jess Glynne	G I R L	Pharrell Williams
16 March	"Tsunami (Jump)"	DVBBS & Borgeous featuring Tinie Tempah	The Take Off and Landing of Everything	Elbow
23 March	"Don't You Want Me"	Human League	In the Arms of an Angel	Nicholas McDonald
30 March	"She Looks So Perfect"	5 Seconds of Summer	The Power of Love	Sam Bailey
6 April	"The Man"	Aloe Blacc	Out Among the Stars	Johnny Cash
13 April	"Nobody to Love"	Sigma	Education, Education, Education & War	Kaiser Chiefs
20 April	"Hideaway"	Kiesza	Caustic Love	Paolo Nutini
27 April	"Waves"	Mr. Probz	Caustic Love	Paolo Nutini
4 May	"Summer"	Calvin Harris	Caustic Love	Paolo Nutini
11 May	"Summer"	Calvin Harris	Caustic Love	Paolo Nutini
18 May	"I Will Never Let You Down"	Rita Ora	Caustic Love	Paolo Nutini
25 May	"Stay with Me"	Sam Smith	Ghost Stories	Coldplay
1 June	"Stay with Me"	Sam Smith	Ghost Stories	Coldplay
8 June	"Sing"	Ed Sheeran	Ghost Stories	Coldplay
15 June	"Ghost"	Ella Henderson	48:13	Kasabian
22 June	"Don't Stop"	5 Seconds of Summer	Ultraviolence	Lana Del Rey
29 June	"Ghost"	Ella Henderson	x	Ed Sheeran
6 July	"Problem"	Ariana Grande featuring Iggy Azalea	5 Seconds of Summer	5 Seconds of Summer
13 July	"Somebody to You"	The Vamps featuring Demi Lovato	x	Ed Sheeran
20 July	"Me and My Broken Heart"	Rixton	x	Ed Sheeran
27 July	"Crazy Stupid Love"	Cheryl Cole featuring Tinie Tempah	x	Ed Sheeran
3 August	"Rude"	Magic!	x	Ed Sheeran
10 August	"Love Runs Out"	OneRepublic	x	Ed Sheeran
17 August	"Love Runs Out"	OneRepublic	x	Ed Sheeran
24 August	"Lovers on the Sun"	David Guetta featuring Sam Martin	Great Divide	Twin Atlantic
31 August	"Prayer in C"	Lilly Wood & Robin Schulz	Royal Blood	Royal Blood
7 September	"Superheroes"	The Script	Royal Blood	Royal Blood
14 September	"Blame"	Calvin Harris featuring John Newman	Lullaby and... The Ceaseless Roar	Robert Plant
21 September	"Changing"	Sigma featuring Paloma Faith	No Sound Without Silence	The Script
28 September	"Bang Bang"	Jessie J, Ariana Grande & Nicki Minaj	Wanted on Voyage	George Ezra
5 October	"All About That Bass"	Meghan Trainor	Wanted on Voyage	George Ezra
12 October	"All About That Bass"	Meghan Trainor	Wanted on Voyage	George Ezra
19 October	"All About That Bass"	Meghan Trainor	Chapter One	Ella Henderson
26 October	"All About That Bass"	Meghan Trainor	I Forget Where We Were	Ben Howard
2 November	"Thinking Out Loud"	Ed Sheeran	1989	Taylor Swift
9 November	"I Don't Care"	Cheryl Cole	Motion	Calvin Harris
16 November	"Wake Me Up!"	Gareth Malone's All Star Choir	The Endless River	Pink Floyd
23 November	"Do They Know It's Christmas?"	Band Aid 30	Four	One Direction
30 November	"These Days"	Take That	Never Been Better	Olly Murs
7 December	"Blank Space"	Taylor Swift	Rock or Bust	AC/DC
14 December	"Uptown Funk"	Mark Ronson featuring Bruno Mars	x	Ed Sheeran
21 December	"Something I Need"	Ben Haenow	x	Ed Sheeran
28 December	"Uptown Funk"	Mark Ronson featuring Bruno Mars	x	Ed Sheeran

=== 2015 ===
Date	Single	Artist	Album	Artist
4 January	"Uptown Funk"	Mark Ronson featuring Bruno Mars	x	Ed Sheeran
11 January	"Uptown Funk"	Mark Ronson featuring Bruno Mars	Wanted on Voyage	George Ezra
18 January	"Uptown Funk"	Mark Ronson featuring Bruno Mars	Wanted on Voyage	George Ezra
25 January	"Uptown Funk"	Mark Ronson featuring Bruno Mars	American Beauty/American Psycho	Fall Out Boy
1 February	"Uptown Funk"	Mark Ronson featuring Bruno Mars	Title	Meghan Trainor
8 February	"Love Me Like You Do"	Ellie Goulding	Shadows in the Night	Bob Dylan
15 February	"Love Me Like You Do"	Ellie Goulding	In the Lonely Hour	Sam Smith
22 February	"Love Me Like You Do"	Ellie Goulding	Smoke + Mirrors	Imagine Dragons
1 March	"Love Me Like You Do"	Ellie Goulding	In the Lonely Hour	Sam Smith
8 March	"King"	Years & Years	Chasing Yesterday	Noel Gallagher's High Flying Birds
15 March	"Lay Me Down"	Sam Smith featuring John Legend	In the Lonely Hour	Sam Smith
22 March	"Lay Me Down"	Sam Smith featuring John Legend	In the Lonely Hour	Sam Smith
29 March	"Hold My Hand"	Jess Glynne	Chaos and the Calm	James Bay
5 April	"Hold My Hand"	Jess Glynne	The Day Is My Enemy	The Prodigy
12 April	"Lost Stars"	Stevie McCrorie	Future Hearts	All Time Low
19 April	"See You Again"	Wiz Khalifa featuring Charlie Puth	The Ultimate Collection	Paul Simon
26 April	"See You Again"	Wiz Khalifa featuring Charlie Puth	Stages	Josh Groban
3 May	"I Really Like You"	Carly Rae Jepsen	The Magic Whip	Blur
10 May	"Cheerleader"	OMI	Wilder Mind	Mumford & Sons
17 May	"Bills"	LunchMoney Lewis	Wilder Mind	Mumford & Sons
24 May	"Bad Blood"	Taylor Swift featuring Kendrick Lamar	The Desired Effect	Brandon Flowers
31 May	"Want to Want Me"	Jason Derulo	1989	Taylor Swift
7 June	"Want to Want Me"	Jason Derulo	How Big, How Blue, How Beautiful	Florence and the Machine
14 June	"Want to Want Me"	Jason Derulo	Drones	Muse
21 June	"Five More Hours"	Deorro & Chris Brown	Drones	Muse
28 June	"Are You with Me"	Lost Frequencies	1989	Taylor Swift
5 July	"Are You with Me"	Lost Frequencies	The Definitive Collection	Lionel Richie
10 July	"Shine"	Years & Years	x	Ed Sheeran
17 July	"Black Magic"	Little Mix	Communion	Years & Years
24 July	"Black Magic"	Little Mix	Communion	Years & Years
31 July	"Glitterball"	Sigma featuring Ella Henderson	Born in the Echoes	The Chemical Brothers
7 August	"Drag Me Down"	One Direction	Marks to Prove It	The Maccabees
14 August	"Marvin Gaye"	Charlie Puth featuring Meghan Trainor	Compton	Dr. Dre
21 August	"Don't Be So Hard on Yourself"	Jess Glynne	Chaos and the Calm	James Bay
28 August	"Fight Song"	Rachel Platten	I Cry When I Laugh	Jess Glynne
4 September	"What Do You Mean?"	Justin Bieber	I Cry When I Laugh	Jess Glynne
11 September	"Easy Love"	Sigala	The Book of Souls	Iron Maiden
18 September	"Easy Love"	Sigala	Keep the Village Alive	Stereophonics
25 September	"Easy Love"	Sigala	Rattle That Lock	David Gilmour
2 October	"Writing's on the Wall"	Sam Smith	Every Open Eye	Chvrches
9 October	"Alone No More"	Philip George & Anton Powers	We the Generation	Rudimental
16 October	"Runnin' (Lose It All)"	Naughty Boy featuring Beyoncé & Arrow Benjamin	Faithless 2.0	Faithless
23 October	"Perfect"	One Direction	Jamie Lawson	Jamie Lawson
30 October	"Hello"	Adele	Sounds Good Feels Good	5 Seconds of Summer
6 November	"Hello"	Adele	If I Can Dream	Elvis Presley
13 November	"Hello"	Adele	If I Can Dream	Elvis Presley
20 November	"Hello"	Adele	Made in the A.M.	One Direction
27 November	"Sorry"	Justin Bieber	25	Adele
4 December	"Love Yourself"	Justin Bieber	25	Adele
11 December	"Sweet Lovin'"	Sigala featuring Bryn Christopher	25	Adele
18 December	"Love Yourself"	Justin Bieber	25	Adele
25 December	"A Bridge over You"	Lewisham and Greenwich NHS Choir	25	Adele

=== 2016 ===
Date	Single	Artist	Album	Artist
1 January	"Love Yourself"	Justin Bieber	If I Can Dream	Elvis Presley
8 January	"Love Yourself"	Justin Bieber	If I Can Dream	Elvis Presley
15 January	"Stitches"	Shawn Mendes	Blackstar	David Bowie
22 January	"Stitches"	Shawn Mendes	Blackstar	David Bowie
29 January	"Fast Car"	Jonas Blue featuring Dakota	Blackstar	David Bowie
5 February	"Pillowtalk"	Zayn	Best of Bowie	David Bowie
12 February	"7 Years"	Lukas Graham	A Head Full of Dreams	Coldplay
19 February	"7 Years"	Lukas Graham	25	Adele
26 February	"7 Years"	Lukas Graham	25	Adele
4 March	"7 Years"	Lukas Graham	I Like It When You Sleep, for You Are So Beautiful yet So Unaware of It	The 1975
11 March	"I Took a Pill in Ibiza" (SeeB remix)	Mike Posner	25	Adele
18 March	"I Took a Pill in Ibiza" (SeeB remix)	Mike Posner	25	Adele
25 March	"I Took a Pill in Ibiza" (SeeB remix)	Mike Posner	Girl at the End of the World	James
2 April	"I Took a Pill in Ibiza" (SeeB remix)	Mike Posner	25	Adele
9 April	"I Took a Pill in Ibiza" (SeeB remix)	Mike Posner	Everything You've Come to Expect	The Last Shadow Puppets
16 April	"Cheap Thrills"	Sia featuring Sean Paul	Painting of a Panic Attack	Frightened Rabbit
23 April	"Cheap Thrills"	Sia featuring Sean Paul	The Hope Six Demolition Project	PJ Harvey
30 April	"Purple Rain"	Prince & The Revolution	Lemonade	Beyoncé
7 May	"This Is What You Came For"	Calvin Harris featuring Rihanna	Lemonade	Beyoncé
14 May	"This Is What You Came For"	Calvin Harris featuring Rihanna	A Moon Shaped Pool	Radiohead
21 May	"Can't Stop the Feeling!"	Justin Timberlake	Lemonade	Beyoncé
28 May	"Can't Stop the Feeling!"	Justin Timberlake	These People	Richard Ashcroft
4 June	"Can't Stop the Feeling!"	Justin Timberlake	The Ride	Catfish and the Bottlemen
11 June	"Can't Stop the Feeling!"	Justin Timberlake	Stranger to Stranger	Paul Simon
18 June	"This Girl"	Kungs vs. Cookin' on 3 Burners	50	Rick Astley
25 June	"Give Me Your Love"	Sigala feat. John Newman and Nile Rodgers	A Moon Shaped Pool	Radiohead
2 July	"This Girl"	Kungs vs. Cookin' on 3 Burners	25	Adele
9 July	"This Girl"	Kungs vs. Cookin' on 3 Burners	California	Blink-182
16 July	"Dancing on My Own"	Calum Scott	Ellipsis	Biffy Clyro
23 July	"Dancing on My Own"	Calum Scott	Ellipsis	Biffy Clyro
30 July	"Dancing on My Own"	Calum Scott	All Over the World: The Very Best of Electric Light Orchestra	Electric Light Orchestra
6 August	"Dancing on My Own"	Calum Scott	Viola Beach	Viola Beach
13 August	"Let Me Love You"	DJ Snake featuring Justin Bieber	Blossoms	Blosoms
20 August	"Dancing on My Own"	Calum Scott	All Over the World: The Very Best of Electric Light Orchestra	Electric Light Orchestra
27 August	"Dancing on My Own"	Calum Scott	Blonde	Frank Ocean
3 September	"Closer"	The Chainsmokers featuring Halsey	Encore: Movie Partners Sing Broadway	Barbra Streisand
10 September	"Closer"	The Chainsmokers featuring Halsey	Cartwheels	Ward Thomas
17 September	"Closer"	The Chainsmokers featuring Halsey	Wild World	Bastille
24 September	"My Way"	Calvin Harris	The Lost Songs of St Kilda	Trevor Morrison, Scottish Festival Orchestra and James MacMillan
1 October	"Say You Won't Let Go"	James Arthur	Chapter and Verse	Bruce Springsteen
8 October	"Say You Won't Let Go"	James Arthur	22, A Million	Bon Iver
15 October	"Say You Won't Let Go"	James Arthur	Revolution Radio	Green Day
22 October	"Shout Out to My Ex"	Little Mix	Walls	Kings of Leon
29 October	"Shout Out to My Ex"	Little Mix	Nobody but Me	Michael Bublé
5 November	"Shout Out to My Ex"	Little Mix	Mapping the Rendezvous	The Courteeners
12 November	"Rockabye"	Clean Bandit featuring Sean Paul and Anne-Marie	The Heavy Entertainment Show	Robbie Williams
19 November	"Rockabye"	Clean Bandit featuring Sean Paul and Anne-Marie	Long Live the Angels	Emeli Sandé
26 November	"Rockabye"	Clean Bandit featuring Sean Paul and Anne-Marie	Glory Days	Little Mix
3 December	"Rockabye"	Clean Bandit featuring Sean Paul and Anne-Marie	Glory Days	Little Mix
10 December	"Rockabye"	Clean Bandit featuring Sean Paul and Anne-Marie	Blue & Lonesome	The Rolling Stones
17 December	"Just Hold On"	Steve Aoki and Louis Tomlinson	Together	Michael Ball and Alfie Boe
24 December	"Glad All Over"	The Dave Clark Five	Together	Michael Ball and Alfie Boe
31 December	"Rockabye"	Clean Bandit featuring Sean Paul and Anne-Marie	Glory Days	Little Mix

=== 2017 ===
Date	Single	Artist	Album	Artist
6 January	"Human"	Rag'n'Bone Man	Glory Days	Little Mix
13 January	"Castle on the Hill"	Ed Sheeran	Glory Days	Little Mix
20 January	"Castle on the Hill"	Ed Sheeran	I See You	The xx
27 January	"Castle on the Hill"	Ed Sheeran	Classic House	Pete Tong, Heritage Orchestra and Jules Buckley
4 February	"Castle on the Hill"	Ed Sheeran	La La Land: Original Motion Picture Soundtrack	Original Soundtrack
11 February	"Shape of You"	Ed Sheeran	Little Fictions	Elbow
18 February	"Shape of You"	Ed Sheeran	Human	Rag'n'Bone Man
25 February	"How Would You Feel (Paean)"	Ed Sheeran	Human	Rag'n'Bone Man
4 March	"Shape of You"	Ed Sheeran	Human	Rag'n'Bone Man
11 March	"Shape of You"	Ed Sheeran	÷	Ed Sheeran
18 March	"Galway Girl"	Ed Sheeran	÷	Ed Sheeran
25 March	"Galway Girl"	Ed Sheeran	÷	Ed Sheeran
1 April	"Galway Girl"	Ed Sheeran	÷	Ed Sheeran
8 April	"Symphony"	Clean Bandit featuring Zara Larsson	÷	Ed Sheeran
15 April	"Sign of the Times"	Harry Styles	÷	Ed Sheeran
22 April	"Sign of the Times"	Harry Styles	÷	Ed Sheeran
29 April	"Symphony"	Clean Bandit featuring Zara Larsson	Tears on the Dancefloor	Steps
6 May	"I'm the One"	DJ Khaled featuring Justin Bieber, Quavo, Chance the Rapper and Lil Wayne	Humanz	Gorillaz
13 May	"Despacito (Remix)"	Luis Fonsi and Daddy Yankee featuring Justin Bieber	For Crying Out Loud	Kasabian
20 May	"Despacito (Remix)"	Luis Fonsi and Daddy Yankee featuring Justin Bieber	Harry Styles	Harry Styles
27 May	"Despacito (Remix)"	Luis Fonsi and Daddy Yankee featuring Justin Bieber	÷	Ed Sheeran
3 June	"Despacito (Remix)"	Luis Fonsi and Daddy Yankee featuring Justin Bieber	Sgt. Pepper's Lonely Hearts Club Band	The Beatles
10 June	"One Last Time"	Ariana Grande	Is This the Life We Really Want?	Roger Waters
17 June	"Despacito (Remix)"	Luis Fonsi and Daddy Yankee featuring Justin Bieber	Truth Is a Beautiful Thing	London Grammar
24 June	"Bridge over Troubled Water"	Artists for Grenfell	How Did We Get So Dark?	Royal Blood
1 July	"Bridge over Troubled Water"	Artists for Grenfell	OK Computer OKNOTOK 1997 2017}	Radiohead
8 July	"Despacito (Remix)"	Luis Fonsi and Daddy Yankee featuring Justin Bieber	÷	Ed Sheeran
15 July	"Despacito (Remix)"	Luis Fonsi and Daddy Yankee featuring Justin Bieber	÷	Ed Sheeran
22 July	"Despacito (Remix)"	Luis Fonsi and Daddy Yankee featuring Justin Bieber	Night & Day	The Vamps
29 July	"Despacito (Remix)"	Luis Fonsi and Daddy Yankee featuring Justin Bieber	Lust for Life	Lana Del Rey
5 August	"Despacito (Remix)"	Luis Fonsi and Daddy Yankee featuring Justin Bieber	Everything Now	Arcade Fire
12 August	"Despacito (Remix)"	Luis Fonsi and Daddy Yankee featuring Justin Bieber	Adiós	Glen Campbell
19 August	"What About Us"	Pink	The 50 Greatest Hits	Elvis Presley
26 August	"What About Us"	Pink	The 50 Greatest Hits	Elvis Presley
2 September	"Look What You Made Me Do"	Taylor Swift	Villains	Queens of the Stone Age
9 September	"What About Us"	Pink	Freedom Child	The Script
16 September	"Too Good at Goodbyes"	Sam Smith	Sleep Well Beast	The National
23 September	"What About Us"	Pink	Concrete and Gold	Foo Fighters
30 September	"What About Us"	Pink	Wonderful Wonderful	The Killers
7 October	"Lonely Together"	Avicii featuring Rita Ora	Now	Shania Twain
14 October	"Lonely Together"	Avicii featuring Rita Ora	As You Were	Liam Gallagher
21 October	"Havana"	Camila Cabello featuring Young Thug	Beautiful Trauma	Pink
28 October	"Perfect"	Ed Sheeran	Listen Without Prejudice Vol. 1 / MTV Unplugged	George Michael
4 November	"Havana"	Camila Cabello featuring Young Thug	Scream Above the Sounds	Stereophonics
11 November	"Anywhere"	Rita Ora	The Thrill of It All	Sam Smith
18 November	"Anywhere"	Rita Ora	Reputation	Taylor Swift
25 November	"Anywhere"	Rita Ora	The Architect	Paloma Faith
2 December	"Anywhere"	Rita Ora	Who Built the Moon?	Noel Gallagher's High Flying Birds
9 December	"Perfect"	Ed Sheeran	÷	Ed Sheeran
16 December	"Perfect"	Ed Sheeran	÷	Ed Sheeran
23 December	"Perfect"	Ed Sheeran	÷	Ed Sheeran
30 December	"Perfect"	Ed Sheeran	÷	Ed Sheeran

=== 2018 ===
Date	Single	Artist	Album	Artist
5 January	"Perfect"	Ed Sheeran	÷	Ed Sheeran
12 January	"Perfect"	Ed Sheeran	÷	Ed Sheeran
19 January	"River"	Eminem featuring Ed Sheeran	The Greatest Showman: Original Motion Picture Soundtrack	Various artists
26 January	"Strangers"	Sigrid	Ruins	First Aid Kit
2 February	"Strangers"	Sigrid	The Greatest Showman: Original Motion Picture Soundtrack	Various artists
9 February	"These Days"	Rudimental featuring Jess Glynne, Macklemore and Dan Caplen	The Greatest Showman: Original Motion Picture Soundtrack	Various artists
16 February	"These Days"	Rudimental featuring Jess Glynne, Macklemore and Dan Caplen	The Greatest Showman: Original Motion Picture Soundtrack	Various artists
23 February	"These Days"	Rudimental featuring Jess Glynne, Macklemore and Dan Caplen	The Greatest Showman: Original Motion Picture Soundtrack	Various artists
2 March	"These Days"	Rudimental featuring Jess Glynne, Macklemore and Dan Caplen	The Greatest Showman: Original Motion Picture Soundtrack	Various artists
9 March	"These Days"	Rudimental featuring Jess Glynne, Macklemore and Dan Caplen	The Greatest Showman: Original Motion Picture Soundtrack	Various artists
16 March	"These Days"	Rudimental featuring Jess Glynne, Macklemore and Dan Caplen	The Greatest Showman: Original Motion Picture Soundtrack	Various artists
23 March	"Paradise"	George Ezra	The Greatest Showman: Original Motion Picture Soundtrack	Various artists
30 March	"Paradise"	George Ezra	Staying at Tamara's	George Ezra
6 April	"Paradise"	George Ezra	The Greatest Showman: Original Motion Picture Soundtrack	Various artists
13 April	"One Kiss"	Calvin Harris and Dua Lipa	Golden	Kylie Minogue
20 April	"One Kiss"	Calvin Harris and Dua Lipa	Resistance Is Futile	Manic Street Preachers
27 April	"One Kiss"	Calvin Harris and Dua Lipa	The Greatest Showman: Original Motion Picture Soundtrack	Various artists
4 May	"One Kiss"	Calvin Harris and Dua Lipa	The Greatest Showman: Original Motion Picture Soundtrack	Various artists
11 May	"One Kiss"	Calvin Harris and Dua Lipa	The Greatest Showman: Original Motion Picture Soundtrack	Various artists
18 May	"One Kiss"	Calvin Harris and Dua Lipa	Tranquility Base Hotel & Casino	Arctic Monkeys
25 May	"One Kiss"	Calvin Harris and Dua Lipa	The Greatest Showman: Original Motion Picture Soundtrack	Various artists
1 June	"I'll Be There"	Jess Glynne	Wildness	Snow Patrol
8 June	"Shotgun"	George Ezra	The Greatest Showman: Original Motion Picture Soundtrack	Various artists
15 June	"Shotgun"	George Ezra	Staying at Tamara's	George Ezra
22 June	"Shotgun"	George Ezra	Staying at Tamara's	George Ezra
29 June	"Shotgun"	George Ezra	Staying at Tamara's	George Ezra
6 July	"Shotgun"	George Ezra	High as Hope	Florence and the Machine
13 July	"Shotgun"	George Ezra	Staying at Tamara's	George Ezra
20 July	"Shotgun"	George Ezra	Night & Day	The Vamps
27 July	"Shotgun"	George Ezra	Mamma Mia! Here We Go Again: The Movie Soundtrack	Various artists
3 August	"Shotgun"	George Ezra	Mamma Mia! Here We Go Again: The Movie Soundtrack	Various artists
10 August	"Shotgun"	George Ezra	Mamma Mia! Here We Go Again: The Movie Soundtrack	Various artists
17 August	"Shotgun"	George Ezra	Mamma Mia! Here We Go Again: The Movie Soundtrack	Various artists
24 August	"Promises"	Calvin Harris and Sam Smith	Sweetener	Ariana Grande
31 August	"Promises"	Calvin Harris and Sam Smith	Mamma Mia! Here We Go Again: The Movie Soundtrack	Various artists
7 September	"Promises"	Calvin Harris and Sam Smith	Kamikaze	Eminem
14 September	"Promises"	Calvin Harris and Sam Smith	Egypt Station	Paul McCartney
21 September	"Promises"	Calvin Harris and Sam Smith	True Meanings	Paul Weller
28 September	"Promises"	Calvin Harris and Sam Smith	Living the Dream	Slash
5 October	"Promises"	Calvin Harris and Sam Smith	Blood Red Roses	Rod Stewart
12 October	"Shallow"	Lady Gaga and Bradley Cooper	A Star Is Born	Lady Gaga and Bradley Cooper
19 October	"Shallow"	Lady Gaga and Bradley Cooper	A Star Is Born	Lady Gaga and Bradley Cooper
26 October	"Shallow"	Lady Gaga and Bradley Cooper	A Star Is Born	Lady Gaga and Bradley Cooper
2 November	"Shallow"	Lady Gaga and Bradley Cooper	Sì	Andrea Bocelli
9 November	"Shallow"	Lady Gaga and Bradley Cooper	A Star Is Born	Lady Gaga and Bradley Cooper
16 November	"Shallow"	Lady Gaga and Bradley Cooper	Simulation Theory	Muse
23 November	"Thursday"	Jess Glynne	Love	Michael Bublé
30 November	"Sweet but Psycho"	Ava Max	Odyssey	Take That
7 December	"The Power of Love"	Dalton Harris featuring James Arthur	A Brief Inquiry into Online Relationships	The 1975
14 December	"Nothing Breaks Like a Heart"	Mark Ronson featuring Miley Cyrus	Staying at Tamara's	George Ezra
21 December	"We Built This City"	LadBaby	Staying at Tamara's	George Ezra
28 December	"Sweet but Psycho"	Ava Max	The Greatest Showman: Original Motion Picture Soundtrack	Various artists

=== 2019 ===
Date	Single	Artist	Album	Artist
4 January	"Sweet but Psycho"	Ava Max	The Greatest Showman: Original Motion Picture Soundtrack	Various artists
11 January	"Sweet but Psycho"	Ava Max	The Greatest Showman: Original Motion Picture Soundtrack	Various artists
18 January	"Sweet but Psycho"	Ava Max	The Greatest Showman: Original Motion Picture Soundtrack	Various artists
25 January	"7 Rings"	Ariana Grande	It Won/t Be Like This All the Time	The Twilight Sad
1 February	"Giant"	Calvin Harris and Rag'n'Bone Man	Amo	Bring Me the Horizon
8 February	"Giant"	Calvin Harris and Rag'n'Bone Man	Encore	The Specials
15 February	"Someone You Loved"	Lewis Capaldi	Thank U, Next	Ariana Grande
22 February	"Someone You Loved"	Lewis Capaldi	A Star Is Born	Lady Gaga and Bradley Cooper
1 March	"Someone You Loved"	Lewis Capaldi	The Greatest Showman: Original Motion Picture Soundtrack	Various artists
8 March	"Someone You Loved"	Lewis Capaldi	What a Time to Be Alive	Tom Walker
15 March	"Someone You Loved"	Lewis Capaldi	Everything Not Saved Will Be Lost – Part 1	Foals
22 March	"Someone You Loved"	Lewis Capaldi	Singing to Strangers	Jack Savoretti
29 March	"Someone You Loved"	Lewis Capaldi	Coming Home to You	Michael Ball
5 April	"Someone You Loved"	Lewis Capaldi	When We All Fall Asleep, Where Do We Go?	Billie Eilish
12 April	"Someone You Loved"	Lewis Capaldi	Interview Music	Idlewild
19 April	"Someone You Loved"	Lewis Capaldi	Map of the Soul: Persona	BTS
26 April	"Someone You Loved"	Lewis Capaldi	Map of the Soul: Persona	BTS
3 May	"Me!"	Taylor Swift featuring Brendon Urie	Hurts 2B Human	Pink
10 May	"Hold Me While You Wait"	Lewis Capaldi	Hurts 2B Human	Pink
17 May	"I Don't Care"	Ed Sheeran and Justin Bieber	Hurts 2B Human	Pink
24 May	"I Don't Care"	Ed Sheeran and Justin Bieber	Divinely Uninspired to a Hellish Extent	Lewis Capaldi
31 May	"I Don't Care"	Ed Sheeran and Justin Bieber	Divinely Uninspired to a Hellish Extent	Lewis Capaldi
7 June	"I Don't Care"	Ed Sheeran and Justin Bieber	Divinely Uninspired to a Hellish Extent	Lewis Capaldi
14 June	"Shockwave"	Liam Gallagher	Divinely Uninspired to a Hellish Extent	Lewis Capaldi
21 June	"You Need to Calm Down"	Taylor Swift	Western Stars	Bruce Springsteen
28 June	"Canter"	Gerry Cinnamon	Western Stars	Bruce Springsteen
5 July	"Old Town Road"	Lil Nas X	Step Back in Time: The Definitive Collection	Kylie Minogue
12 July	"Señorita"	Shawn Mendes and Camila Cabello	Divinely Uninspired to a Hellish Extent	Lewis Capaldi
19 July	"Señorita"	Shawn Mendes and Camila Cabello	No.6 Collaborations Project	Ed Sheeran
26 July	"Señorita"	Shawn Mendes and Camila Cabello	No.6 Collaborations Project	Ed Sheeran
2 August	"Señorita"	Shawn Mendes and Camila Cabello	No.6 Collaborations Project	Ed Sheeran
9 August	"Higher Love"	Kygo and Whitney Houston	Divinely Uninspired to a Hellish Extent	Lewis Capaldi
16 August	"Higher Love"	Kygo and Whitney Houston	We Are Not Your Kind	Slipknot
23 August	"Higher Love"	Kygo and Whitney Houston	The Last Dance – Farewell Concert (Live at Stirling)	Runrig
30 August	"Higher Love"	Kygo and Whitney Houston	Lover	Taylor Swift
6 September	"Higher Love"	Kygo and Whitney Houston	Norman Fucking Rockwell	Lana Del Rey
13 September	"Higher Love"	Kygo and Whitney Houston	Backbone	Status Quo
20 September	"Don't Call Me Angel"	Ariana Grande, Miley Cyrus and Lana Del Rey	Hypersonic Missiles	Sam Fender
27 September	"The Last Time"	The Script	Why Me? Why Not.	Liam Gallagher
4 October	"Dance Monkey"	Tones and I	Abbey Road	The Beatles
11 October	"Dance Monkey"	Tones and I	Without Fear	Dermot Kennedy
18 October	"Dance Monkey"	Tones and I	Giants of All Sizes	Elbow
25 October	"Dance Monkey"	Tones and I	Everything Not Saved Will Be Lost – Part 2	Foals
1 November	"Dance Monkey"	Tones and I	Kind	Stereophonics
8 November	"Dance Monkey"	Tones and I	From Out of Nowhere	Jeff Lynne's ELO
15 November	"Dance Monkey"	Tones and I	Reworked	Snow Patrol
22 November	"Before You Go"	Lewis Capaldi	Spectrum	Westlife
29 November	"Before You Go"	Lewis Capaldi	Everyday Life	Coldplay
6 December	"Before You Go"	Lewis Capaldi	You're in My Heart: Rod Stewart with the Royal Philharmonic Orchestra	Rod Stewart and the Royal Philharmonic Orchestra
13 December	"Dance Monkey"	Tones and I	You're in My Heart: Rod Stewart with the Royal Philharmonic Orchestra	Rod Stewart and the Royal Philharmonic Orchestra
20 December	"I Love Sausage Rolls"	LadBaby	You're in My Heart: Rod Stewart with the Royal Philharmonic Orchestra	Rod Stewart and the Royal Philharmonic Orchestra
27 December	"Dance Monkey"	Tones and I	You're in My Heart: Rod Stewart with the Royal Philharmonic Orchestra	Rod Stewart and the Royal Philharmonic Orchestra

=== 2020 ===
Date	Single	Artist	Album	Artist
3 January	"Before You Go"	Lewis Capaldi	Divinely Uninspired to a Hellish Extent	Lewis Capaldi
10 January	"Come Out, Ye Black and Tans"	The Wolfe Tones	Divinely Uninspired to a Hellish Extent	Lewis Capaldi
17 January	"Dance Monkey"	Tones and I	Rare	Selena Gomez
24 January	"Blinding Lights"	The Weeknd	More. Again. Forever.	The Courteeners
31 January	"Before You Go"	Lewis Capaldi	Power	Twin Atlantic
7 February	"Blinding Lights"	The Weeknd	Walls	Louis Tomlinson
14 February	"Blinding Lights"	The Weeknd	Father of All Motherfuckers	Green Day
21 February	"No Time to Die"	Billie Eilish	The Slow Rush	Tame Impala
28 February	"Blinding Lights"	The Weeknd	Map of the Soul: 7	BTS
6 March	"Stupid Love"	Lady Gaga	Divinely Uninspired to a Hellish Extent	Lewis Capaldi
13 March	"Blinding Lights"	The Weeknd	City of Love	Deacon Blue
20 March	"Blinding Lights"	The Weeknd	Mixtape	The Snuts
27 March	"Blinding Lights"	The Weeknd	I Am Not a Dog on a Chain	Morrissey
3 April	"Blinding Lights"	The Weeknd	Calm	5 Seconds of Summer
10 April	"Blinding Lights"	The Weeknd	Future Nostalgia	Dua Lipa
17 April	"Everyday Heroes"	Skerryvore	The New Abnormal	The Strokes
24 April	"You'll Never Walk Alone"	Michael Ball, Captain Tom and The NHS Voices of Care Choir	The Bonny	Gerry Cinnamon
1 May	"Times Like These"	Live Lounge Allstars	The Bonny	Gerry Cinnamon
8 May	"Times Like These"	Live Lounge Allstars	Eye of the Storm	Tide Lines
15 May	"Blinding Lights"	The Weeknd	Petals for Armor	Hayley Williams
22 May	"Dead Man's Blues"	Luke La Volpe	People Like Us	Callum Beattie
29 May	"Rain on Me"	Lady Gaga and Ariana Grande	Notes on a Conditional Form	The 1975
5 June	"Rain on Me"	Lady Gaga and Ariana Grande	Chromatica	Lady Gaga
12 June	"Rain on Me"	Lady Gaga and Ariana Grande	Deep Down Happy	Sports Team
19 June	"Edinburgh"	Joshua Grant	MTV Unplugged (Live at Hull City Hall)	Liam Gallagher
26 June	"Savage Love (Laxed – Siren Beat)"	Jawsh 685 and Jason Derulo	Rough and Rowdy Ways	Bob Dylan
3 July	"Savage Love (Laxed – Siren Beat)"	Jawsh 685 and Jason Derulo	Rough and Rowdy Ways	Bob Dylan
10 July	"Savage Love (Laxed – Siren Beat)"	Jawsh 685 and Jason Derulo	On Sunset	Paul Weller
17 July	"Head & Heart"	Joel Corry featuring MNEK	The Glow	DMA's
24 July	"Head & Heart"	Joel Corry featuring MNEK	Rough and Rowdy Ways	Bob Dylan
31 July	"Head & Heart"	Joel Corry featuring MNEK	Twenty Twenty	Ronan Keating
7 August	"You Are My Sunshine"	Gareth Malone's great British	A Hero's Death	Fontaines D.C.
14 August	"Head & Heart"	Joel Corry featuring MNEK	Whoosh!	Deep Purple
21 August	"Head & Heart"	Joel Corry featuring MNEK	A Celebration of Endings	Biffy Clyro
28 August	"Dynamite"	BTS	Imploding the Mirage	The Killers
4 September	"Lighter"	Nathan Dawe featuring KSI	S&M2	Metallica
11 September	"Lasting Lover"	Sigala and James Arthur	Goats Head Soup	The Rolling Stones
18 September	"Midnight Sky"	Miley Cyrus	The Universal Want	Doves
25 September	"Lasting Lover"	Sigala and James Arthur	Tea for the Tillerman2	Cat Stevens
2 October	"Lasting Lover"	Sigala and James Arthur	Ultra Mono	Idles
9 October	"Lasting Lover"	Sigala and James Arthur	Live Around the World	Queen + Adam Lambert
16 October	"Midnight Sky"	Miley Cyrus	10 Songs	Travis
23 October	"Lasting Lover"	Sigala and James Arthur	Cherry Blossom	The Vamps
30 October	"Sweet Melody"	Little Mix	Letter to You	Bruce Springsteen
6 November	"Four Notes – Paul's Tune"	Paul Harvey and BBC Philharmonic	Letter to You	Bruce Springsteen
13 November	"Midnight Sky"	Miley Cyrus	Disco	Kylie Minogue
20 November (Note: Only Physical sales were counted towards the chart.)	"Be a Rebel"	New Order	Power Up	AC/DC
27 November (Note: Only Physical sales were counted towards the chart.)	"Life Goes On"	BTS	Together At Christmas	Michael Ball & Alfie Boe
4 December (Note: Only Physical sales were counted towards the chart.)	"Always"	The Snuts	Music Played by Humans	Gary Barlow
11 December	—N/a		Weird	Yungblud
18 December	—N/a		Classic Diamonds	Neil Diamond and LSO
25 December	—N/a		McCartney III	Paul McCartney

=== 2021 ===
Date	Album	Artist
1 January	Classic Diamonds	Neil Diamond and LSO
8 January	Classic Diamonds	Neil Diamond and LSO
15 January	Greenfields: The Gibb Brothers Songbook, Vol. 1	Barry Gibb
22 January	Suckapunch	You Me at Six
29 January	Post Human: Survival Horror	Bring Me the Horizon
5 February	Not Your Muse	Celeste
12 February	Medicine at Midnight	Foo Fighters
19 February	Tyron	Slowthai
26 February	As the Love Continues	Mogwai
5 March	Nature Always Wins	Maxïmo Park
12 March	As Days Get Dark	Arab Strap
19 March	All the Right Noises	Thunder
26 March	Chemtrails over the Country Club	Lana Del Rey
2 April	Collections from the Whiteout	Ben Howard
9 April	W.L.	The Snuts
16 April	Fearless (Taylor's Version)	Taylor Swift
23 April	Californian Soil	London Grammar
30 April	Surrounded by Time	Tom Jones
7 May	Typhoons	Royal Blood
14 May	Life by Misadventure	Rag'n'Bone Man
21 May	Fat Pop (Volume 1)	Paul Weller
28 May	Sour	Olivia Rodrigo
4 June	Hi	Texas
11 June	Blue Weekend	Wolf Alice
18 June	Back the Way We Came: Vol. 1 (2011–2021)	Noel Gallagher's High Flying Birds
25 June	Carnage	Nick Cave and Warren Ellis
2 July	Europiana	Jack Savoretti
9 July	Greatest Hits	Queen
16 July	It Won't Always Be Like This	Inhaler
23 July	All Over the Place	KSI
30 July	We're All Alone in This Together	Dave
6 August	Happier Than Ever	Billie Eilish
13 August	All Things Must Pass	George Harrison
20 August	Pressure Machine	The Killers
27 August	Sour	Olivia Rodrigo
3 September	Screen Violence	Chvrches
10 September	Senjutsu	Iron Maiden
17 September	The Ultra Vivid Lament	Manic Street Preachers
24 September	The Bootleg Series Vol. 16: Springtime in New York 1980–1985	Bob Dylan
1 October	How Beautiful Life Can Be	The Lathums
8 October	Tales from the Script: Greatest Hits	The Script
15 October	Seventeen Going Under	Sam Fender
22 October	Music of the Spheres	Coldplay
29 October	The Myth of the Happily Ever After	Biffy Clyro
5 November	=	Ed Sheeran
12 November	Voyage	ABBA
19 November	Red (Taylor's Version)	Taylor Swift
26 November	30	Adele
3 December	30	Adele
10 December	30	Adele
17 December	30	Adele
24 December	30	Adele
31 December	30	Adele

=== 2022 ===
Date	Album	Artist
7 January	30	Adele
14 January	Transparency	Twin Atlantic
21 January	The Boy Named If	Elvis Costello and the Imposters
28 January	The Overload	Yard Act
4 February	Happy Place	Saint Phnx
11 February	Give Me the Future	Bastille
18 February	FTHC	Frank Turner
25 February	Disrespectful	Bad Boy Chiller Crew
4 March	The Tipping Point	Tears for Fears
11 March	Oochya!	Stereophonics
18 March	Who Cares?	Rex Orange County
25 March	Crash	Charli XCX
1 April	Higher	Michael Bublé
8 April	Unlimited Love	Red Hot Chili Peppers
15 April	Wet Leg	Wet Leg
22 April	Noughty by Nature	Digga D
29 April	Skinty Fia	Fontaines D.C.
6 May	Zeit	Rammstein
13 May	We	Arcade Fire
20 May	Dance Fever	Florence and the Machine
27 May	Harry's House	Harry Styles
3 June	C'mon You Know	Liam Gallagher
10 June	Scared to Dance	Skids
17 June	Gold Rush Kid	George Ezra
24 June	Life Is Yours	Foals
1 July	Closure/Continuation	Porcupine Tree
8 July	Last Night in the Bittersweet	Paolo Nutini
15 July	Last Night in the Bittersweet	Paolo Nutini
22 July	Last Night in the Bittersweet	Paolo Nutini
29 July	The Theory of Whatever	Jamie T
5 August	Renaissance	Beyoncé
12 August	Speed of Life	Port Sulphur
19 August	The Alchemist's Euphoria	Kasabian
26 August	Platinum Collection	Steps
2 September	Will of the People	Muse
9 September	Yungblud	Yungblud
16 September	XXV	Robbie Williams
23 September	Hold the Girl	Rina Sawayama
30 September	5SOS5	5 Seconds of Summer
7 October	Burn the Empire	The Snuts
14 October	N.K-Pop	Paul Heaton and Jacqui Abbott
21 October	Being Funny in a Foreign Language	The 1975
28 October	Midnights	Taylor Swift
4 November	Revolver: Special Edition	The Beatles
11 November	Palomino	First Aid Kit
18 November	Only the Strong Survive	Bruce Springsteen
25 November	Sonder	Dermot Kennedy
2 December	Christmas with Cliff	Cliff Richard
9 December	Marry Me	Olly Murs
16 December	There's Nothing but Space, Man!	Sam Ryder
23 December	Midnights	Taylor Swift
30 December	Midnights	Taylor Swift

=== 2023 ===
Date	Album	Artist
6 January	Midnights	Taylor Swift
13 January	Midnights	Taylor Swift
20 January	St. Jude	Courteeners
27 January	What's Rock and Roll?	The Reytons
3 February	Gloria	Sam Smith
10 February	Queen of Me	Shania Twain
17 February	This Is Why	Paramore
24 February	Trustfall	Pink
3 March	Vandals	Callum Beattie
10 March	An Ocean Full of Islands	Tide Lines
17 March	Endless Summer Vacation	Miley Cyrus
24 March	Songs of Surrender	U2
31 March	Did You Know That There's a Tunnel Under Ocean Blvd	Lana Del Rey
7 April	The Record	Boygenius
14 April	Higher Than Heaven	Ellie Goulding
21 April	72 Seasons	Metallica
28 April	Folklore: The Long Pond Studio Sessions	Taylor Swift
5 May	First Two Pages of Frankenstein	The National
12 May	-	Ed Sheeran
19 May	The Love Invention	Alison Goldfrapp
26 May	Broken by Desire to Be Heavenly Sent	Lewis Capaldi
2 June	Broken by Desire to Be Heavenly Sent	Lewis Capaldi
9 June	But Here We Are	Foo Fighters
16 June	The Show	Niall Horan
23 June	The Very Best of 1989–2023	Texas
30 June	The Good Witch	Maisie Peters
7 July	Destination Düsseldorf	Skids
14 July	Speak Now (Taylor's Version)	Taylor Swift
21 July	Live at Hampden Park	Gerry Cinnamon
28 July	The Ballad of Darren	Blur
4 August	Unhealthy	Anne-Marie
11 August	Victory	Cian Ducrot
18 August	Knebworth 22	Liam Gallagher
25 August	Exorcism of Youth	The View
1 September	Unmask the Circus	Mark Sharp & the Bicycle Thieves
8 September	Back to the Water Below	Royal Blood
15 September	Guts	Olivia Rodrigo
22 September	Greatest Hits 2.0	Busted
29 September	Tension	Kylie Minogue
6 October	The Harmony Codex	Steven Wilson
13 October	The Dark Side of the Moon Redux	Roger Waters
20 October	Sick Boi	Ren
27 October	Hackney Diamonds	The Rolling Stones
3 November	1989 (Taylor's Version)	Taylor Swift
10 November	The Masterplan	Oasis
17 November	All the Little Lights – Anniversary Edition	Passenger
24 November	Theatre of the Absurd Presents C'est la Vie	Madness
1 December	This Life	Take That
8 December	The World EP.Fin: Will	Ateez
15 December	Rebel Diamonds	The Killers
22 December	Hackney Diamonds	The Rolling Stones
29 December	Hackney Diamonds	The Rolling Stones

=== 2024 ===
Date	Album	Artist
5 January	Broken by Desire to Be Heavenly Sent	Lewis Capaldi
12 January	A Matter of Time	Shed Seven
19 January	Pick-Up Full of Pink Carnations	The Vaccines
26 January	Saviors	Green Day
2 February	Wall of Eyes	The Smile
9 February	Prelude to Ecstasy	The Last Dinner Party
16 February	What Happened to the Beach?	Declan McKenna
23 February	Tangk	Idles
1 March	Millennials	The Snuts
8 March	Liam Gallagher John Squire	Liam Gallagher John Squire
15 March	Invincible Shield	Judas Priest
22 March	Deeper Well	Kacey Musgraves
29 March	Glasgow Eyes	The Jesus and Mary Chain
5 April	Cowboy Carter	Beyoncé
12 April	All Quiet on the Eastern Esplanade	The Libertines
19 April	Hombres	Gun
26 April	The Tortured Poets Department	Taylor Swift
3 May	Nonetheless	Pet Shop Boys
10 May	Radical Optimism	Dua Lipa
17 May	Can We Please Have Fun	Kings of Leon
24 May	Hit Me Hard and Soft	Billie Eilish
31 May	Clancy	Twenty One Pilots
7 June	Golden Hour: Part.1	Ateez
14 June	The Tortured Poets Department	Taylor Swift
21 June	Business as Usual	The LaFontaines
28 June	The Secret of Us	Gracie Abrams
5 July	Loom	Imagine Dragons
12 July	Happenings	Kasabian
19 July	L.A. Times	Travis
26 July	Heavy Jelly	Soft Play
2 August	Rite Here Rite Now	Ghost
9 August	The Rise and Fall of a Midwest Princess	Chappell Roan
16 August	This Is How Tomorrow Moves	Beabadoobee
23 August	A Firmer Hand	Hamish Hawk
30 August	Short n' Sweet	Sabrina Carpenter
6 September	Definitely Maybe	Oasis
13 September	Luck and Strange	David Gilmour
20 September	The Forest Is the Path	Snow Patrol
27 September	I Am	Tom Walker
4 October	Liquid Gold	Shed Seven
11 October	Moon Music	Coldplay
18 October	The Mighty Several	Paul Heaton
25 October	Tension II	Kylie Minogue
1 November	Chromakopia	Tyler, the Creator
8 November	Songs of a Lost World	The Cure
15 November	1994	Nathan Evans
22 November	From Zero	Linkin Park
29 November	Small Changes	Michael Kiwanuka
6 December	The Tortured Poets Department	Taylor Swift
13 December	The Tortured Poets Department	Taylor Swift
20 December	Short n' Sweet	Sabrina Carpenter
27 December	Short n' Sweet	Sabrina Carpenter

=== 2025 ===
Date	Album	Artist
3 January	Short n' Sweet	Sabrina Carpenter
10 January	Diamonds	Elton John
17 January	The Human Fear	Franz Ferdinand
24 January	Better Man	Robbie Williams
31 January	The Bad Fire	Mogwai
7 February	Hurry Up Tomorrow	The Weeknd
14 February	Lover (Live from Paris)	Taylor Swift
21 February	Critical Thinking	Manic Street Preachers
28 February	People Watching	Sam Fender
7 March	Constellations for the Lonely	Doves
14 March	Mayhem	Lady Gaga
21 March	The Overview	Steven Wilson
28 March	The Great Western Road	Deacon Blue
4 April	Rushmere	Mumford & Sons
11 April	Who Believes in Angels?	Elton John and Brandi Carlile
18 April	God Shaped Hole	Those Damn Crows
25 April	The Tortured Poets Department	Taylor Swift
2 May	Glasgow Love Story	Tide Lines
9 May	Pink Floyd at Pompeii – MCMLXXII	Pink Floyd
16 May	Even in Arcadia	Sleep Token
23 May	I'm the Problem	Morgan Wallen
30 May	Mad!	Sparks
6 June	Don't Worry It's Forever	Sister John
13 June	More	Pulp
20 June	Don't Tell the Dog	James Marriott
27 June	Idols	Yungblud
4 July	Virgin	Lorde
11 July	Short n' Sweet	Sabrina Carpenter
18 July	Is This What You've Been Waiting For?	Amy Macdonald
25 July	Don't Tap the Glass	Tyler, the Creator
1 August	Pretty on the Internet	The K's
8 August	Bite Me	Reneé Rapp
15 August	Songs for the Spine	The Royston Club
22 August	Everywhere I Went, Led Me to Where I Didn't Want to Be	Tom Grennan
29 August	The Clearing	Wolf Alice
5 September	Man's Best Friend	Sabrina Carpenter
12 September	Antidepressants	Suede
19 September	Breach	Twenty One Pilots
26 September	Futique	Biffy Clyro
3 October	The Art of Loving	Olivia Dean
10 October	The Life of a Showgirl	Taylor Swift
17 October	Lovin' You	Richard Ashcroft
24 October	From the Pyre	The Last Dinner Party
31 October	Forever (Legendary Edition)	Bon Jovi
7 November	Everybody Scream	Florence and the Machine
14 November	Ego Death at a Bachelorette Party	Hayley Williams
21 November	Everyone's a Star!	5 Seconds of Summer
28 November	One More Time	Aerosmith and Yungblud
5 December	The Art of Loving	Olivia Dean
12 December	Kylie Christmas (Fully Wrapped)	Kylie Minogue
19 December	Wish You Were Here	Pink Floyd
26 December	The Art of Loving	Olivia Dean

=== 2026 ===
Date	Album	Artist
2 January	Man's Best Friend	Sabrina Carpenter
9 January	The Art of Loving	Olivia Dean
16 January	Reflections	Blue
23 January	Angels' Share	Nathan Evans and Saint Phnx
30 January	Indi	Callum Beattie
6 February	West End Girl	Lily Allen
13 February	Clair Obscur: Expedition 33	Lorien Testard
20 February	Wuthering Heights	Charli XCX
27 February	Prizefighter	Mumford & Sons
6 March	Nothing's About to Happen to Me	Mitski
13 March	Kiss All the Time. Disco, Occasionally.	Harry Styles
20 March	Trying Times	James Blake
27 March	Arirang	BTS
3 April	This Music May Contain Hope	Raye
10 April	The Weight of the Woods	Dermot Kennedy
17 April	We Will Always Be the Way We Were	Jack Savoretti
24 April	Superbloom	Jessie Ware
1 May	The Great Divide	Noah Kahan
8 May	Fenian	Kneecap
15 May	25: The Ultimate Collection	Westlife
22 May	This Is the Bluebells	The Bluebells
29 May	Florescence	Maisie Peters
5 June	The Boys of Dungeon Lane	Paul McCartney
12 June	Dinner Party	Niall Horan
19 June	You Seem Pretty Sad for a Girl So in Love	Olivia Rodrigo
26 June	10	Tide Lines
3 July	The Wow! Signal	Muse
10 July	Confessions II	Madonna
17 July	Foreign Tongues	The Rolling Stones
24 July	Daughter from Hell	Gracie Abrams
31 July	Music, Fashion, Film	Charli XCX
7 August	Petal	Ariana Grande
14 August	As We Once Were	The Anchoress
21 August	Lost Weekend	Phoebe Bridgers
28 August	Jenius	Paul Heaton
4 September	Wildchild	Alex Warren
11 September	Prima	Adéla
18 September	Here Because of Hope	Ezra Collective
25 September	Pylon	Beabadoobee
2 October	Put a Smile On for Me	Keo
9 October	Rubber Soul	The Beatles
16 October	Ghosts (100 Days of Morning)	Jamie T
23 October	Dopamine Chamber	Fontaines D.C.
30 October	The Black Parade	My Chemical Romance
6 November	Joy in Short Moments	The Snuts
13 November	Beautiful Mistakes	Skerryvore
20 November	Carnaval de Luz	U2

== See also ==
- List of one-hit wonders in Scotland
