= Travis discography =

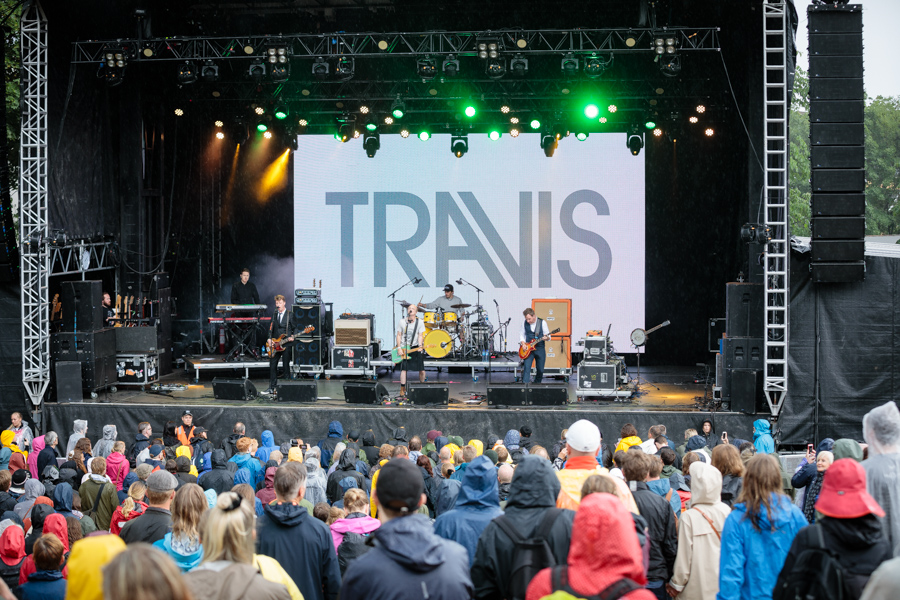
- Travis at the Vigeland Stage in the Vigeland Park, 2018
- Studio albums: 10
- Live albums: 2
- Compilation albums: 1
- Singles: 24
- Video albums: 3
- Music videos: 23

This is a comprehensive discography listing of Scottish rock band Travis. The line–up comprising Fran Healy (lead vocals, guitar, piano, banjo), Dougie Payne (bass guitar, backing vocals), Andy Dunlop (lead guitar, banjo, keyboards, backing vocals) and Neil Primrose (drums, percussion) have twice been awarded British album of the year at the annual Brit Awards, and are often credited with having paved the way for bands such as Coldplay, Keane, Elbow and Snow Patrol.

Their debut album, Good Feeling, was released in 1997 to moderate success where it debuted at number nine on the UK Albums Chart and was later awarded a silver certification from the British Phonographic Industry (BPI) in January 2000. In 1999, they released "Writing to Reach You" at the lead single from their second studio album, The Man Who, which was released in May 1999. The album was an international breakthrough for the band, selling more than 3.5 million copies worldwide, and yielded the successful singles "Driftwood", "Why Does It Always Rain on Me?" and "Turn". The Man Who was named the 70th greatest album of all time by Q. At the Brit Awards 2010, it was nominated for the Best Album of the Past 30 Years award, losing to Oasis's (What's the Story) Morning Glory? The album was included in the book 1001 Albums You Must Hear Before You Die. As of May 2016, The Man Who has sold 2,687,500 copies in the United Kingdom alone.

In 2000, Travis released the non–album single "Coming Around" to commercial success, reaching number one in their native Scotland, and the top five in the United Kingdom, with chart success in Ireland and the European Hot 100 Singles. In 2001, they released "Sing", which became their highest-charting single in the United Kingdom, peaking at number three. In both Scotland and France, "Sing" reached number two, whilst in the United States, it reached fourteen on the Adult Alternative Airplay and thirty-seven on the Alternative Airplay respectively. Their third album, The Invisible Band, was released in June 2001, and was supported by a further two single releases – "Side" and "Flowers in the Window". The Invisible Band was certified 4× Platinum in the United Kingdom. "Re-Offender" was released in September 2003 as the lead single from their fourth album, 12 Memories, which was released in October 2003. Their fifth album, The Boy with No Name, was released in 2007, and yielded the singles "Closer", "Selfish Jean" and "My Eyes".

Their sixth album, Ode to J. Smith (2008), failed to reach the commercial success Travis had maintained since 1999. Following its release, the band entered a period of inactivity, until returning in 2013 with Where You Stand which returned the band to commercial success, reaching number one in Scotland, three in Switzerland and the United Kingdom and six in Germany. Subsequent album releases, Everything at Once (2016) and 10 Songs were also strong commercial successes for the band, and their latest album, L.A. Times, gave the band their highest-charting entry in the United Kingdom since 12 Memories in 2003, debuting at number two on the UK Albums Charts, as well as reaching number one in Scotland.

== Albums ==
=== Studio albums ===
List of studio albums, with selected chart positions, sales figures and certifications
Title	Album details	Peak chart positions										Certifications
Title	Album details	UK	AUS	AUT	BEL	FRA	GER	IRL	NOR	SWI	US	Certifications
Good Feeling	Released: 8 September 1997; Label: Independiente; Formats: CD, LP, MD, cassette, download	9	—	—	—	—	—	—	—	—	—	BPI: Platinum
The Man Who	Released: 24 May 1999; Label: Independiente; Formats: CD, LP, MD, cassette, download	1	8	46	—	—	34	2	18	85	135	BPI: 9× Platinum; ARIA: Platinum; IFPI EU: 3× Platinum
The Invisible Band	Released: 11 June 2001; Label: Independiente, Epic; Formats: CD, LP, MD, cassette, download	1	7	2	9	13	3	1	1	6	39	BPI: 4× Platinum; ARIA: Platinum; BVMI: Gold; IFPI EU: 2× Platinum; IFPI NOR: Platinum; IFPI SWI: Gold; SNEP: Gold
12 Memories	Released: 13 October 2003; Label: Independiente, Epic; Formats: CD, LP, cassette, download	3	42	8	38	19	9	17	4	8	41	BPI: Platinum; IFPI NOR: Gold
The Boy with No Name	Released: 7 May 2007; Label: Independiente, Epic; Formats: CD, LP, download	4	97	18	73	41	8	20	2	7	58	BPI: Gold
Ode to J. Smith	Released: 29 September 2008; Label: Red Telephone Box, Fontana; Formats: CD, LP, download	20	—	36	69	87	49	—	27	16	122	
Where You Stand	Released: 19 August 2013; Label: Red Telephone Box, Kobalt; Formats: CD, LP, download	3	—	18	35	104	6	63	16	3	100	
Everything at Once	Released: 29 April 2016; Label: Red Telephone Box; Formats: CD, LP, download	5	—	51	64	147	33	58	—	20	—	
10 Songs	Released: 9 October 2020; Label: BMG; Formats: CD, LP, cassette, download	5	—	32	145	160	22	—	—	13	—	
L.A. Times	Released: 12 July 2024; Label: BMG; Formats: CD, LP, download	2	—	—	—	—	15	—	—	75	—	

=== Live albums ===
List of live albums
Title	Album details
Live at Glastonbury '99	Released: 21 June 2019; Label: UMC/Concord; Formats: CD, LP, download
The Invisible Band Live	Released: 21 April 2023; Label: UMC/Concord; Formats: LP, download

=== Compilation albums ===
List of compilation albums, with selected chart positions, sales figures and certifications
Title	Album details	Peak chart positions					Certifications
Title	Album details	UK	AUT	GER	IRL	NOR	Certifications
Singles	Released: 1 November 2004; Label: Independiente, Epic; Formats: CD, MC, download	4	66	55	13	6	BPI: 2× Platinum

== Singles ==
List of singles, with selected chart positions and certifications, showing year released as single and album name
Title	Year	Peak chart positions										Certifications	Album
Title	Year	UK	AUS	BEL	GER	IRL	NL	NOR	NZ	SWI	US Alt.	Certifications	Album
"All I Want to Do Is Rock"	1996	39	—	—	—	—	—	—	—	—	—		Good Feeling
"U16 Girls"	1997	40	—	—	—	—	—	—	—	—	—		Good Feeling
"Tied to the 90's"	1997	30	—	—	—	—	—	—	—	—	—		Good Feeling
"Happy"	1997	38	—	—	—	—	—	—	—	—	—		Good Feeling
More Than Us EP	1998	16	—	—	—	—	—	—	—	—	—		Good Feeling
"Writing to Reach You"	1999	14	—	—	—	—	—	—	—	—	—		The Man Who
"Driftwood"	1999	13	—	—	91	—	—	—	—	—	—	BPI: Silver	The Man Who
"Why Does It Always Rain on Me?"	1999	10	11	65	56	26	73	—	20	87	35	BPI: Platinum; ARIA: Gold; RMNZ: Gold	The Man Who
"Turn"	1999	8	—	—	—	28	—	—	37	—	—	BPI: Silver	The Man Who
"Coming Around"	2000	5	—	—	—	18	—	—	—	—	—		Non-album single
"Sing"	2001	3	41	22	51	7	81	4	8	34	37	BPI: Platinum	The Invisible Band
"Side"	2001	14	71	—	86	33	97	—	20	52	—		The Invisible Band
"Flowers in the Window"	2002	18	92	—	98	35	—	—	—	93	—	BPI: Silver	The Invisible Band
"Re-Offender"	2003	7	85	—	—	45	87	12	—	84	—		12 Memories
"The Beautiful Occupation"	2003	48	—	—	97	—	—	—	—	—	—		12 Memories
"Love Will Come Through"	2004	28	—	—	—	—	—	—	—	—	—		12 Memories
"Walking in the Sun"	2004	20	—	—	94	—	—	—	—	71	—		Singles
"Closer"	2007	10	—	70	69	—	—	8	—	32	—		The Boy with No Name
"Selfish Jean"	2007	30	—	—	—	—	—	—	—	—	—		The Boy with No Name
"My Eyes"	2007	60	—	—	—	—	—	—	—	—	—		The Boy with No Name
"J. Smith"	2008	115	—	—	—	—	—	—	—	—	—		Ode to J. Smith
"Something Anything"	2008	113	—	—	—	—	—	—	—	—	—		Ode to J. Smith
"Song to Self"	2009	—	—	—	—	88	—	—	—	—	—		Ode to J. Smith
"Where You Stand"	2013	—	—	—	—	—	—	—	—	—	—		Where You Stand
"Moving"	2013	—	—	—	—	—	—	—	—	—	—		Where You Stand
"Mother"	2013	—	—	—	—	—	—	—	—	—	—		Where You Stand
"Everything at Once"	2015	—	—	—	—	—	—	—	—	—	—		Everything at Once
"3 Miles High"	2016	—	—	—	—	—	—	—	—	—	—		Everything at Once
"Radio Song"	2016	—	—	—	—	—	—	—	—	—	—		Everything at Once
"Magnificent Time"	2016	—	—	—	—	—	—	—	—	—	—		Everything at Once
"What Will Come"	2016	—	—	—	—	—	—	—	—	—	—		Everything at Once
"Animals"	2016	—	—	—	—	—	—	—	—	—	—		Everything at Once
"Idlewild"	2016	—	—	—	—	—	—	—	—	—	—		Everything at Once
"Paralysed"	2016	—	—	—	—	—	—	—	—	—	—		Everything at Once
"Nothing Ever Happens"	2016	—	—	—	—	—	—	—	—	—	—		Non-album single
"Kissing in the Wind"	2019	—	—	—	—	—	—	—	—	—	—		10 Songs
"A Ghost"	2020	—	—	—	—	—	—	—	—	—	—		10 Songs
"Valentine"	2020	—	—	—	—	—	—	—	—	—	—		10 Songs
"The Only Thing"	2020	—	—	—	—	—	—	—	—	—	—		10 Songs
"All Fall Down"	2020	—	—	—	—	—	—	—	—	—	—		10 Songs
"Waving at the Window"	2020	—	—	—	—	—	—	—	—	—	—		10 Songs
"Nina's Song"	2020	—	—	—	—	—	—	—	—	—	—		10 Songs
"Gaslight"	2024	—	—	—	—	—	—	—	—	—	—		L.A. Times
"Bus"	2024	—	—	—	—	—	—	—	—	—	—		L.A. Times
"Avalon"	2025	—	—	—	—	—	—	—	—	—	—	—	Non-album single

=== Other releases ===
Title	Year	Album
"Another Guy"	2013	Where You Stand

== Videos and DVDs ==
Year	Video/DVD	Notes
2002	More Than Us	The footage includes Travis' full set from the Gig on the Green concert in their hometown of Glasgow on 26 August 2001, and a unique video diary of the band on the road. Although the DVD cover states PCM stereo, it is in actuality, Dolby Digital 2.0.
2004	Travis at the Palace	Captures the band live in concert in front of an 8,000 strong crowd, at London's Alexandra Palace on 20 December 2003.
2004	Singles	Contains all 17 of the promotional videos, in chronological order, and exclusive live performances include "Why Does It Always Rain on Me?" from the band's headline Glastonbury show in 2000 and Healy and Payne's rendition of "Baby One More Time" from VH1's Storytellers.

== Other ==
- 2002: The Story So Far 1996–2002, a book documenting the history of the band between the titular years. Sold at the 2002 tour.

== Covers of other artists ==
Songs that Travis have covered include:

- Del Amitri's "Nothing Ever Happens"
- Joni Mitchell's "River" and "Urge for Going"
- The Band's "The Weight"
- Mott the Hoople's "All the Young Dudes"
- Elton John's "Rocket Man"
- John Lennon's "Gimme Some Truth"
- The Beatles' "Here Comes the Sun"
- The Beatles' "Lovely Rita"
- AC/DC's "Back in Black"
- Elvis Presley's "Suspicious Minds"
- Queen's "Killer Queen" with Jason Falkner
- David Bowie's "Heroes" "Space Oddity"
- The Ronettes' "Be My Baby"
- Britney Spears' "...Baby One More Time"
- Jimmy Webb's "Wichita Lineman"
- Graham Nash's "Another Sleep Song"
- Bob Dylan's "You're a Big Girl Now"
- Carly Simon's "Nobody Does It Better"
- Keane's "Somewhere Only We Know" (a modified live acoustic version titled "After Mark and Lard Go")
- The Kinks' "Lola"
- Katy Perry's "I Kissed a Girl"
- Big Star's "Thirteen"
- Squeeze's "Up the Junction", "Is That Love" and "Pulling Mussels (From the Shell)"
- Paul McCartney's "Pipes of Peace"
- Talking Heads' "Psycho Killer"
- George Michael's "Faith"
