= List of songs recorded by Travis =

This is a list of songs by Scottish alternative rock group Travis. The band have released eight studio albums since their formation in 1995. This list does not contain live versions or remixes released by the band.

== Original songs ==
Song title	Album(s) / Single(s)	First released
"12th Memory"	12 Memories (hidden track, Japanese release)	2003
"1922"	"All I Want to Do Is Rock"	1996–1997
"20"	"All I Want to Do Is Rock", The Man Who (few releases)	1996–1997, 1999
"3 Miles High"	Everything at Once	2016
"3 Times and You Lose"	The Boy with No Name	2007
"Afterglow"	The Invisible Band	2001
"A Different Room"	Where You Stand	2013
"A Little Bit of Soul"	"Flowers in the Window"	2002
"All I Want to Do Is Rock"	Good Feeling	1997
"All of the Places"	Everything at Once	2016
"Ancient Train"	"Side"	2001
"Animals"	Everything at Once	2016
"Anniversary"	Where You Stand	2013
"Another Guy"	Where You Stand	2013
"As You Are"	The Man Who	1999
"Back in the Day"	"The Beautiful Occupation"	2003
"Ballad of J. Smith"	"Song to Self"	2009
"Battleships"	The Boy with No Name	2007
"Beautiful"	"Sing"	2001
"Beautiful Bird"	"More Than Us"	1998
"Before You Were Young"	Ode to J. Smith	2008
"Big Chair"	The Boy with No Name	2007
"Blue Flashing Light"	The Man Who (hidden track)	1999
"Blue on a Black Weekend"	"All I Want to Do Is Rock"	1996–1997
"Bring Me Round"	"Walking in the Sun"	2004
"Boxes"	Where You Stand	2013
"Broken Mirror"	Ode to J. Smith	2008
"Central Station"	"Flowers in the Window"	2002
"Chances"	"My Eyes"	2007
"Chinese Blues"	Ode to J. Smith	2008
"City in the Rain"	"Tied to the 90s"	1997
"Closer"	The Boy with No Name	2007
"Colder"	The Boy with No Name	2007
"Combing My Hair"	"All I Want to Do Is Rock"	1996–1997
"Coming Around"	The Man Who (Irish edition), Stand-alone single	1999, 2000
"Days of Our Lives"	"Turn"	1999
"Dear Diary"	The Invisible Band	2001
"Definition of Wrong"	12 Memories (Japanese release), "Re-Offender"	2003
"Distraction"	"The Beautiful Occupation"	2003
"Driftwood"	The Man Who	1999
"Enemy"	"Re-Offender"	2003
"Everyday Faces"	"Happy"	1997
"Everything at Once"	Everything at Once	2016
"Eyes Wide Open"	The Boy with No Name	2007
"Falling Down"	Good Feeling	1997
"Ferris Wheel"	Where You Stand	2013
"Flowers in the Window"	The Invisible Band	2001
"Friends"	Ode to J. Smith	2008
"Follow the Light"	The Invisible Band	2001
"Funny Thing"	Good Feeling, "More Than Us"	1997, 1998
"Get Up"	Ode to J. Smith, "J. Smith"	2008
"Good Day to Die"	Good Feeling	1997
"Good Feeling"	Good Feeling	1997
"Good for Nothing"	"Love Will Come Through"	2004
"Good Time Girls"	"U16 Girls"	1997
"Green Behind the Ears"	"Writing to Reach You"	1999
"Happy"	Good Feeling	1997
"Happy to Hang Around"	12 Memories	2003
"Hazy Shades of Gold"	"U16 Girls"	1997
"High as a Kite"	"Writing to Reach You"	1999
"How Many Hearts"	12 Memories	2003
"I Don't Mean to Get High"	"The Beautiful Occupation"	2003
"I Forget My Name"	"Walking in the Sun"	2004
"I Love You Anyways"	Good Feeling	1997
"Idlewild"	Everything at Once	2016
"Indefinitely"	The Invisible Band	2001
"J. Smith"	Ode to J. Smith	2008
"Just the Faces Change"	"Coming Around"	2000
"Know Nothing"	"Love Will Come Through"	2004
"Last Train"	The Invisible Band	2001
"Last Words"	Ode to J. Smith	2008
"Life and Soul of the Party"	"Walking in the Sun"	2004
"Long Way Down"	Ode to J. Smith	2008
"Love Will Come Through"	12 Memories	2003
"Luv"	The Man Who	1999
"Magnificent Time"	Everything at Once	2016
"Me Beside You"	"Tied to the 90s"	1997
"Mid-Life Krysis"	12 Memories	2003
"Midsummer Night's Dreamin'"	Good Feeling	1997
"More Than Us"	Good Feeling	1997
"Mother"	"Happy"	1997
"Mother"	Where You Stand	2013
"Moving"	Where You Stand	2013
"My Eyes"	The Boy with No Name	2007
"My Last Chance"	"My Eyes"	2007
"New Amsterdam"	The Boy with No Name	2007
"New Shoes"	Where You Stand	2013
"No Cigar"	"Flowers in the Window"	2002
"On My Wall"	Where You Stand	2013
"One Night"	The Boy with No Name	2007
"Only Molly Knows"	The Man Who (some releases), "Writing to Reach You"	1999
"Out in Space"	The Boy with No Name	2007
"Paperclips"	12 Memories	2003
"Paralysed"	Everything at Once	2016
"Parallel Lines (Daydream)"	Where You Stand	2013
"Peace the Fuck Out"	12 Memories	2003
"Perfect Heaven Space"	The Boy with No Name (UK release)	2007
"Pipe Dreams"	The Invisible Band	2001
"Quicksand"	12 Memories	2003
"Quite Free"	Ode to J. Smith	2008
"Radio Song"	Everything at Once	2016
"Re-Offender"	12 Memories	2003
"Reminder"	Where You Stand	2013
"Ring Out the Bell"	The Invisible Band, "Sing"	2001
"Rock 'n' (Salad) Roll"	"Coming Around"	2000
"Safe"	The Invisible Band	2001
"Sailing Away"	The Boy with No Name (hidden track)	2007
"Sarah"	Ode to J. Smith (Japanese bonus track), "J. Smith"	2008
"Say Hello"	The Boy with No Name (iTunes bonus track)	2007
"Selfish Jean"	The Boy with No Name	2007
"She's So Strange"	The Man Who	1999
"Side"	The Invisible Band	2001
"Sing"	The Invisible Band	2001
"Slide Show"	The Man Who	1999
"Some Sad Song"	12 Memories (hidden track, U.S. and Japanese releases)	2003
"Something Anything"	Ode to J. Smith	2008
"Somewhere Else"	12 Memories	2003
"Song to Self"	Ode to J. Smith	2008
"Standing on My Own"	"Tied to the 90s"	1997
"Strangers on a Train"	Everything at Once	2016
"Tail of the Tiger"	"Something Anything", "Song to Self"	2008, 2009
"The Beautiful Occupation"	12 Memories	2003
"The Big Screen"	Where You Stand	2013
"The Cage"	The Invisible Band	2001
"The Connection"	"Coming Around"	2000
"The Day To Day"	"Closer"	2007
"The Distance"	Singles	2004
"The Fear"	The Man Who	1999
"The Great Unknown"	"Closer"	2007
"The Humpty Dumpty Love Song"	The Invisible Band	2001
"The Last Laugh of the Laughter"	The Man Who	1999
"The Line Is Fine"	Good Feeling	1997
"The Score"	"The Beautiful Occupation"	2003
"The Sea"	"Re-Offender"	2003
"This Love"	"Closer"	2007
"Tied to the 90s"	Good Feeling	1997
"Turn"	The Man Who	1999
"U16 Girls"	Good Feeling	1997
"Unbelievers"	"Happy"	1997
"Under the Moonlight"	The Boy with No Name	2007
"Used to Belong"	"Something Anything"	2008
"Village Man"	"Why Does It Always Rain on Me?"	1999
"Walking Down the Hill"	12 Memories	2003
"Walking in the Sun"	Singles	2004
"Warning Sign"	Where You Stand	2013
"We Are Monkeys"	"Turn"	1999
"What Will Come"	Everything at Once	2016
"Whenever She Comes Around"	"Tied to the 90s"	1997
"When I'm Feeling Blue (Days of the Week)"	"Happy"	1997
"Where Is the Love"	"Driftwood"	1999
"Where You Stand"	Where You Stand	2013
"Why Does It Always Rain on Me?"	The Man Who	1999
"Writing to Reach You"	The Man Who	1999
"Yeah Yeah Yeah Yeah"	"Writing to Reach You"	1999
"You Bring Me Down"	"Selfish Jean"	2007
"You Don't Know What I'm Like"	The Invisible Band, "Sing"	2001

Note: All singles released by Travis before 2004 appeared on the album Singles.

== Covers ==
The cover versions listed here have been released as a b-side on a single release. All other cover versions performed by Travis have been excluded from this list.

Title	Album / Single	Year released	Original artist
"All the Young Dudes" (live)	"Side"	2001	David Bowie
"Baby One More Time" (live)	"Turn"	1999	Britney Spears
"Be My Baby"	"Driftwood"	1999	The Ronettes
"Don't Be Shy"	"Re-Offender"	2003	Cat Stevens
"Gimme Some Truth"	"More Than Us"	1998	John Lennon
"Here Comes the Sun"	"Flowers in the Window"	2002	The Beatles
"Is That Love"	"Selfish Jean"	2007	Squeeze
"Killer Queen"	"Sing"	2001	Queen
"Lola"	"Something Anything"	2008	The Kinks
"River"	"Turn"	1999	Joni Mitchell
"Pulling Mussels (From the Shell)"	"Selfish Jean"	2007	Squeeze
"The Weight"	"Coming Around"	2000	The Band
"Up the Junction"	"My Eyes"	2007	Squeeze
"Urge for Going"	"Why Does It Always Rain on Me?"	1999	Joni Mitchell
"You're a Big Girl Now"	"Side"	2001	Bob Dylan
