= Singles (Travis album) =

Compilation album by Travis
- Released: 1 November 2004
- Genre: Post-Britpop
- Length: 67:31
- Labels: Independiente, Epic
- Producer: Fran Healy

Travis chronology
12 Memories (2003)	Singles (2004)	The Boy with No Name (2007)

Singles from Singles
- 1. "Walking in the Sun" Released: 18 October 2004

Professional ratings
Review scores
Source	Rating
AllMusic	4/5 stars

Singles is the first and only compilation album by the Scottish rock band Travis, released on 1 November 2004. The album consists of all of the band's singles from 1996 to 2004, as well as including two new tracks, "Walking in the Sun" and "The Distance". The album charted at number 4 on the UK Albums Chart, performing considerably better than 12 Memories, selling the required 300,000 copies to make it a Platinum album.

== Track listing ==
All tracks written by Fran Healy.

1. "Sing"
2. "Driftwood"
3. "Writing to Reach You"
4. "Why Does It Always Rain on Me?"
5. "Re-Offender"
6. "Walking in the Sun"
7. "Tied to the 90's"
8. "Coming Around"
9. "Flowers in the Window"
10. "Love Will Come Through"
11. "More Than Us"
12. "Side"
13. "U16 Girls"
14. "Happy"
15. "All I Want to Do Is Rock"
16. "The Beautiful Occupation"
17. "Turn"
18. "The Distance"
19. "Bring Me Round" (Japanese Bonus Track)
- Tracks 7, 11, 13, 14 & 15 are from the 1997 album Good Feeling
- Tracks 2, 3, 4 and 17 are from the 1999 album The Man Who
- Tracks 1, 9 and 12 are from the 2001 album The Invisible Band
- Tracks 5, 10 and 16 are from the 2003 album 12 Memories
- Tracks 6, 8, 18 and 19 are all stand-alone singles.

Japanese Bonus DVD

1. "U16 Girls"
2. "All I Want to Do Is Rock"
3. "Tied to the 90's"
4. "Happy"
5. "More Than Us"
6. "Writing to Reach You"
7. "Driftwood"
8. "Why Does It Always Rain on Me?"
9. "Turn"
10. "Coming Around"
11. "Sing"
12. "Side"
13. "Flowers in the Window"
14. "Re-Offender"
15. "The Beautiful Occupation"
16. "Love Will Come Through"
17. "Walking in the Sun"

== Personnel ==
- Fran Healy – lead vocals, rhythm guitar
- Andy Dunlop – lead guitar, backing vocals, banjo
- Dougie Payne – bass guitar, backing vocals, lead vocals on "The Distance"
- Neil Primrose – drums and percussion

== Charts ==
=== Weekly charts ===
Chart (2004)	Peak position
Austrian Albums (Ö3 Austria)	66
Belgian Albums (Ultratop Flanders)	90
German Albums (Offizielle Top 100)	55
Irish Albums (IRMA)	13
Norwegian Albums (VG-lista)	6
Scottish Albums (Official Charts)	3
Swiss Albums (Schweizer Hitparade)	26
UK Albums (Official Charts)	4

=== Year-end charts ===
Chart (2004)	Position
UK Albums (OCC)	48
