= The Boy with No Name =

Studio album by Travis
- Released: 7 May 2007
- Recorded: December 2004 – January 2007
- Studios: British Grove, London; The Hospital, London; Kensaltown, London; Mayfair, London; Mercer Street, New York City; RAK, London; The Weston Park Hotel; Westside, London; The Zeppelin, London; Hampstead Heath, London; Washington Square Park, New York City
- Genres: Indie pop, alternative rock
- Length: 52:54
- Labels: Independiente, Epic
- Producers: Travis, Steve Orchard, Nigel Godrich, Mike Hedges, George Tandero

Travis chronology
Singles (2004)	The Boy with No Name (2007)	Ode to J. Smith (2008)

Singles from The Boy with No Name
- 1. "Closer" Released: 23 April 2007; 2. "Selfish Jean" Released: 9 July 2007; 3. "My Eyes" Released: 17 September 2007

The Boy with No Name is the fifth studio album by Scottish rock band Travis, released on 7 May 2007 through Epic Records. The album marked the first time in which other members contributed to songwriting, rather than solely being the responsibility of frontman Fran Healy, who was the sole songwriter across their past four albums. The album was supported by the release of its lead single, "Closer", which was released in April 2007 and reached number one on the Scottish Singles Charts. It reached the top ten in both the United Kingdom and Norway, whilst it achieved moderate success in the likes of Germany, Belgium and Switzerland. A second single, "Selfish Jean", was released in July 2007, reaching the top ten in their native Scotland and number thirty on the UK Singles Charts.

A third and final single, "My Eyes", was released in September 2007. Described by the BBC as their "most eclectic album to date", The Boy with No Name debuted atop the Scottish Albums Charts, whilst it debuted at number four on the UK Albums Charts. The Boy with No Name was certified Gold by the British Phonographic Industry (BPI). It reached the top ten in various international markets, including Norway, Switzerland and Germany, whilst in the United States it peaked at number fifty-eight on the Billboard 200.

== Background ==
The name of the album came about when lead singer Fran Healy and his partner Nora were deciding on a name for their newly born son. During this time, he sent a photo of his son to a friend by email and labeled the photo "The Boy with No Name". Healy revealed this on The Chris Moyles Show during an interview. Healy has also revealed in pre-album release performances that some tracks are influenced by his developing family status, such as "My Eyes" being about his new son or "Battleships" referring to ups and downs of relationships.

Travis dedicated this album to the Abbey Road Studios chief master engineer Chris Blair and British world champion rally driver Richard Burns, who died of a brain tumour at the age of 34 in 2005.

During the recording, the band discovered they were in the same studio as British band Feeder but in different rooms. (Feeder were recording what would be their fifth studio album Pushing the Senses.) It occurred to Fran and Dougie they should help Feeder with their album and provided backing vocals for the final chorus of the first single, "Tumble and Fall".

For the track "Under the Moonlight", backing vocals were recorded by singer-songwriter KT Tunstall, and "Battleships" features backing vocals by Julia Stone.

== Release ==
The Boy with No Name entered at No. 4 on the UK Album Charts. In the U.S., the album debuted at number 58 on the Billboard 200, selling 12,000 copies in its first week. The album went gold in the UK. "Closer" was released as the first single from the album in the United Kingdom on 23 April 2007, and peaked at No. 10 in the UK Singles Chart (see 2007 in British music). Second single "Selfish Jean" made No. 30. The final single, "My Eyes", reached No. 60 – their lowest chart placing during their career at the time. The full album was available to purchase at the Virgin Megastore at the Coachella Valley Music and Arts Festival in California over the weekend of 27 April 2007 – 29 April 2007.

== Reception ==
Professional ratings
Aggregate scores
Source	Rating
Metacritic	57/100
Review scores
Source	Rating
AllMusic	3.5/5 stars
BBC	favourable
Digital Spy	5/5 stars
NME	2/10
New York Daily News	favourable
Pitchfork Media	5.6/10
Philadelphia Inquirer	3/5 stars
Rolling Stone	2.5/5 stars
Q	4/5 stars
PopMatters	6/10

The Boy with No Name received mixed reviews from music critics. At Metacritic, which assigns a normalised rating out of 100 to reviews from mainstream critics, the album received an average score of 57 based on 20 reviews, which indicates "mixed or average reviews". NME gave the album 2 out of 10 and labelled it "impotent aural gruel" with "all the soul of a platform announcement".

Writing for the BBC, Al Fox described the album as their "most eclectic album to date", advising against the single "Closer" giving a false sense of calm tones throughout the album, claiming that the calm and acoustic guitar lead song was "no means a representation" of the wider album. Fox claimed that "Selfish Jean" is a flashback to the bands heavier rock sound that had been "dormant" since the release of their debut album Good Feeling in 1997, some ten years earlier, whilst stating that the likes of "Big Chair" continued "a similarly uptempo sound, but with a considerably darker overtone".

As their first studio album offering since the release of their greatest hits album in 2004, The Boy with No Name was regarded by the BBC as an album in which the band "can afford to take risks", claiming that the band had no "laurels left to rest on" which allowed for the band to be creative and explorative in their recording, songwriting and production techniques for the album. As a result, Al Fox for the BBC said that the band tended not to focus on one specific musical direction on the album, but did cite the fact that the band appear to have "bagged" a lot into the one album. On the opposing side of the arguments, Joey Willis writing for Glide has described The Boy with No Name as being far from the bands best work, but noted that the album "fits solidly in their top albums and sounds exactly like a Travis album should".

== Track listing ==
No.	Title	Writer(s)	Producer(s)	Length
1.	"3 Times and You Lose"	Fran Healy • Andy Dunlop	Steve Orchard	4:14
2.	"Selfish Jean"	Healy	Mike Hedges	4:00
3.	"Closer"	Healy	Steve Orchard • Nigel Godrich	4:00
4.	"Big Chair"	Healy • Dunlop	Steve Orchard	4:07
5.	"Battleships"	Healy	Steve Orchard • Nigel Godrich	4:11
6.	"Eyes Wide Open"	Healy	Mike Hedges	2:59
7.	"My Eyes"	Healy	Steve Orchard • Nigel Godrich	4:08
8.	"One Night"	Healy	George Tandero	4:00
9.	"Under the Moonlight"	Susie Hug	Steve Orchard	4:00
10.	"Out in Space"	Healy	Steve Orchard • Nigel Godrich	3:35
11.	"Colder"	Healy • Dougie Payne	Steve Orchard	4:06
12.	"New Amsterdam" ("New Amsterdam" ends at 2:37, and followed by hidden track "Sailing Away", which begins at 5:50)	Healy	Steve Orchard • Nigel Godrich	9:26

British edition bonus tracks
No.	Title	Writer(s)	Producer(s)	Length
13.	"Perfect Heaven Space" (hidden track)	Healy	Nigel Godrich	3:50

iTunes Store pre-order edition bonus track
No.	Title	Length
14.	"Say Hello"	3:33

Japanese edition bonus tracks
No.	Title	Writer(s)	Producer(s)	Length
14.	"The Great Unknown"	Healy	Steve Orchard • Nigel Godrich	2:25
15.	"Perfect Heaven Space"	Healy	Nigel Godrich	3:50

== Personnel ==
Personnel per booklet.

Travis

- Fran Healy – lead vocals, guitar, harmonica, piano
- Andy Dunlop – guitar
- Dougie Payne – bass guitar, backing vocals
- Neil Primrose – drums, percussion

Production

- Travis – producer (except track 13)
- Steve Orchard – producer (except tracks 2, 6, 8, 10 and 13), engineering (except tracks 8 and 13)
- Mike Hedges – producer (tracks 2 and 6), vocal recordings (tracks 3, 5, 7, 10 and 11)
- George Tandero – producer and engineer (track 8), mixing (tracks 4, 5 and 8)
- Nigel Godrich – additional production (tracks 3, 5, 7 and 10), engineering (track 13)
- Matthieu Clouard – production assistant (tracks 2 and 6), vocal recordings (tracks 3, 7, 10 and 11)
- Jens L Thomsen – assistant engineer (track 8)
- Michael H. Brauer – mixing (except tracks 4, 5 and 8)
- Will Hensley – mix assistant (except tracks 4 and 5)
- Emery Dobyns – Washington Square Park recording (track 12)
- Tappin Gofton – design and art direction
- Stefan Ruiz – photography

Additional musicians

- Julia Stone – backing vocals (track 5)
- KT Tunstall – backing vocals (track 9)
- Manon Morris – harp (track 11)
- Sarah Clarke – clarinet (track 12)
- Joby Talbot – string arrangement (track 2)
- Chris Worsey – cello (track 2)
- Ian Burdge – cello (tracks 2, 3, 5 and 7)
- Zoe Martlew – cello (track 2)
- Lucy Wilkins – violin (track 2)
- Louisa Fuller – violin (track 2)
- Helena Wood – violin (track 2)
- Rick Koster – violin (track 2)
- Richard George – violin (track 2)
- Louisa Aldridge – violin (track 2)
- Jonathan Hill – violin (track 2)
- Darragh Morgan – violin (track 2)
- Jeff Moore – violin (track 2)
- Natalia Bonner – violin (track 2)
- Adrian Smith – viola (track 2)
- Reiad Chibah – viola (track 2)
- John Metcalfe – viola (tracks 2, 3 and 7)
- Rachel Robson – viola (track 2)
- Sally Herbert – string arrangement and violin (tracks 3, 5 and 7)
- Everton Nelson – violin (tracks 3 and 7)
- Calina De La Mare – violin (track 5)
- Oli Langford – viola (track 5)

== Charts ==
=== Weekly charts ===
Weekly chart performance for The Boy with No Name
Chart (2007)	Peak position
Australian Albums (ARIA)	97
Austrian Albums (Ö3 Austria)	18
Belgian Albums (Ultratop Flanders)	98
Belgian Albums (Ultratop Wallonia)	73
Canadian Albums (Nielsen SoundScan)	48
Dutch Albums (Album Top 100)	60
Dutch Alternative Albums (Alternative Top 30)	9
European Albums (Billboard)	7
French Albums (SNEP)	41
German Albums (Offizielle Top 100)	8
Greek Albums (IFPI)	20
Irish Albums (IRMA)	20
Italian Albums (FIMI)	17
Japanese Albums (Oricon)	23
Mexican Albums (Top 100 Mexico)	54
Norwegian Albums (VG-lista)	2
Scottish Albums (Official Charts)	1
Spanish Albums (Promusicae)	54
Swedish Albums (Sverigetopplistan)	51
Swiss Albums (Schweizer Hitparade)	7
UK Albums (Official Charts)	4
US Billboard 200	58
US Top Rock Albums (Billboard)	13

=== Year-end charts ===
Year-end chart performance for The Boy with No Name
Chart (2007)	Position
UK Albums (OCC)	132

== Certifications ==
Certifications for The Boy with No Name
Region	Certification	Certified units/sales
United Kingdom (BPI)	Gold	100,000^{^}
^{^} Shipments figures based on certification alone.
