= Sing (Travis song) =

2001 single by Travis

Single by Travis

from the album The Invisible Band
- B-side: "Ring Out the Bell"; "Killer Queen"; "You Don't Know What I'm Like"; "Beautiful"
- Written: 1999
- Released: 23 April 2001
- Recorded: October 2000–March 2001
- Studio: Ocean Way (Hollywood, California)
- Genre: Pop
- Length: 3:48
- Label: Independiente
- Songwriter: Fran Healy
- Producer: Nigel Godrich

Travis singles chronology
"Coming Around" (2000)	"Sing" (2001)	"Side" (2001)

Alternative cover
- European cover

Music video
- "Sing" on YouTube

"Sing" is a song by Scottish rock band Travis from their third studio album, The Invisible Band (2001). The song was written in 1999 by frontman Fran Healy, produced by Nigel Godrich and recorded at Ocean Way Studios in Los Angeles. It was released as the album's lead single in the United States on 23 April 2001. Healy originally titled the melody "Swing" but eventually changed the title to "Sing", making it about working past the troubles of a relationship by not being afraid to let oneself go and sing in front of a loved one. The song is noted for its prominent use of the banjo, played by lead guitarist Andy Dunlop, and contains a string arrangement performed by Millennia Strings.

"Sing" received acclaim from contemporary music critics, who often praised its writing and production. The song became the band's highest-charting single in the United Kingdom, peaking at number three on the UK Singles Chart and number two on the Scottish Singles Charts. It was a worldwide success as well, reaching the top 10 in several other European countries, including France, peaking at number two, and New Zealand, peaking at number eight. In the US, the song reached the top 40 of the Billboard Triple-A and Modern Rock Tracks charts.

A music video for the song was released on 20 April 2001—it was directed by Jonathan Dayton and Valerie Faris. Filmed in Pasadena, California over three days, it features Travis attending a dinner party that eventually turns into a massive food fight. When Travis appeared on British music programme Top of the Pops, the band members threw pies at each other and the audience while the track played in the background. The video was nominated for Best British Video at the 2002 Brit Awards.

== Background and release ==
Fran Healy explained on the band's official website that he wrote the song in 1999, the day before he planned to go to the studio to record the B-sides for their 1999 single" "Turn". He came up with the song as he watched a swingbeat video on MTV, leading him to compose a basic melody called "Swing" on his guitar. Healy liked the results and said that he appreciated the free chorus and verse melody. "It really felt like it took to the air", he said on the band's official website. The following day, after recording the B-side "We Are Monkeys", Healy began to play the song's chords while the track was rewinding, and the rest of his bandmates soon joined him. Healy then asked for the production of "We Are Monkeys" to be put on hold so they could record a demo of the new composition. As he performed with the rest of Travis, he changed the word "swing" to "sing" on the chorus. Since lead guitarist Andy Dunlop had brought his banjo into the studio for "We Are Monkeys", the instrument was overdubbed into the recording.

The night after recording the demo, Healy decided to change all instances of "swing" to "sing" and modify the lyrics so that the song described the healing powers of singing. The track was recorded between October 2000 and March 2001 at Ocean Way Studios in Los Angeles, California, and was included on The Invisible Band as the opening track. Along with "Flowers in the Window", Healy dedicated the song to his wife Nora Kryst in the album booklet. In the United States, record label Independiente added "Sing" to triple A radio on 23 April 2001 and to alternative radio the following day, while in the United Kingdom, the label serviced the song to radio during the same month and issued it as a CD and cassette single on 28 May 2001. The song was released on CD in Australia on the same day. The following week, on 4 June, a 7-inch single was issued in the UK.

== Composition and lyrics ==
"Sing"
A 22-second sample of the chorus of "Sing", illustrating its prominent use of banjo and strings.

Musically, "Sing" is a pop song with folk elements, which includes a banjo played by Dunlop. Robert Wilonsky of the Dallas Observer described the song as "front-porch blues, if your front porch opens onto central London". Set in common time, it is written in the key of F♯ minor and has a tempo of 80 beats per minute. Healy sings lead vocals and plays guitar while Dougie Payne plays bass and Neil Primrose plays the drums. Dunlop additionally plays piano on the song. The song begins with a synth chord that leads into a rhythm consisting of strumming guitars and the banjo. Additional strings on the song were provided by Millennia Strings and arranged by British composer Joby Talbot.

Lyrically, "Sing" is a love song discussing the inhibitions of a relationship, having been referred to as a "bridge between the hopeless and the hopeful". The chorus partly consists of the repetition of "sing". Healy explained, "First of all, I love the idea of having the word 'sing' repeated in the chorus of a song—it's just so silly," and he elaborated that the emotional weight of the song originates from the belief that "feeling free enough to cut loose and sing in front of someone you love is an indication of extraordinary intimacy and trust." Healy also stated that Kryst partially inspired the word, as she was vocally shy and too nervous to sing around him, which he found vexing.

== Critical reception ==
Norwegian NRK Petre head of music Atle Bredal said of "Sing", "It's brilliant. Classic pop with a folky feel to it. This will be on the radio the whole summer!" Another music director, Rainer Gruhn of German radio station Hundert 6, praised the song's "modern" sound and "wonderful" production. Chuck Taylor of Billboard magazine also positively reviewed the song, describing its lyrics as "playful", "silly", and "sweet", praising the "infectious" hook and going on to call Healy's performance "skillful" while noting how the band and producer Nigel Godrich, avoided turning the song into a commercial anthem. Another Billboard editor, Larry Flick, praised the contrast of the song's production with its guitar and banjo riffs. British columnist James Masterton called the song "anthemic" and noted that the song did not besmirch Travis's reputation following the promotion of their previous album The Man Who (1999).

In a review of The Invisible Band on AllMusic, MacKenzie Wilson described "Sing" as "charming" and said that the banjo sets the track apart from traditional acoustic simplicities, referring to the instrument as a "mainstay". Andy Frankowski of Drowned in Sound called the track an "infectious summer song". Pitchfork writer Kristin Sage Rockermann said that while the lyrics are "banal" and the song as a whole is "cheesy", Healy's voice sounds "passionately expressive" as well as mature and wise. In more recent reviews, Mark Beaumont of NME gave "Sing" a scathing review in 2005, labelling the song a "characterless mandolin dirge" and referring to its success as alcohol-induced altruism. In 2015, the staff of Pop Rescue wrote that Healy's vocals flawlessly complement the instrumentation and were unable to identify any flaws with the song.

== Commercial performance ==
In the UK, "Sing" debuted and peaked at number three on the UK Singles Chart on 3 June 2001, becoming the band's highest-charting single in the UK. It was Travis's 4th top-10 hit and stayed on the chart for 14 weeks, the longest period out of all their singles. The song ended 2001 as the nation's 77th-highest-selling single. In the band's home country of Scotland, the single peaked at number two on the week of its debut. By May 2007, "Sing" had sold 159,000 copies in the UK and was Travis's biggest-selling single out of their 17 top-40 hits. On 15 May 2026, the British Phonographic Industry (BPI) awarded the song a platinum certification for sales and streams of over 600,000 units in the country. On the Irish Singles Chart, the track debuted and peaked at number seven on 31 May 2001, remaining in the top 50 for nine weeks and ranking at number 87 on Ireland's year-end chart.

In mainland Europe, the song peaked at number four in Norway in June 2001, while in Italy, it reached number eight on 9 August. In France, "Sing" debuted at number 50 on 25 August 2001 and rose to its peak of number two the following month. The song spent 23 weeks on the French chart and came in at number 53 on the Syndicat National de l'Édition Phonographique (SNEP) year-end ranking for 2001 as well as earning a silver certification in October of that year. Throughout the rest of Europe, "Sing" reached the top 50 in Austria, Sweden, Switzerland, and the Wallonia region of Belgium, additionally peaking at number 51 in Germany and number 82 in the Netherlands. On the European Hot 100, it charted at number eight, becoming Europe's 60th-most-successful hit of 2001. While missing the top 40 of the Australian ARIA Singles Chart by one position, it topped the ARIA Alternative chart for a single week in August 2001. The song was a top-10 hit in New Zealand, charting at number eight for two weeks in July 2001 and spending 17 weeks in the top 50; the Recording Industry Association of New Zealand (RIANZ) ranked it at number 48 on their 2001 year-end chart. In the US, "Sing" reached number 14 on the Billboard Triple-A chart and number 37 on the Billboard Modern Rock Tracks chart.

== Music video ==
The song's music video, which premiered on British music programme Top of the Pops (TOTP) on 20 April 2001, features the band attending a dinner party at a mansion and getting into a massive food fight with the residents. Travis filmed the video at a mansion in Pasadena, California, with Jonathan Dayton and Valerie Faris working as the directors. Healy has stated that one of his favourite parts of the video is when Payne gets hit with a ball of spinach.

=== Development ===
The video was shot across three days. The mansion selected for the video was owned by a girls school that allowed clients to use the building for movies and weddings, with Healy recalling that the same mansion was used for a Guns N' Roses music video. On the first day, the opening shot of the grandfather clock and Travis arriving to the party in tuxedos was filmed first. The second day was rainy, but filming took place inside the mansion, where Travis met the rest of the cast. At about 3 p.m., the filming of the main food fight scene took place and the cast was covered with food by the end of the day. As the filming proceeded, prints were made from the takes and placed on a storyboard so the directors could tweak the final product. Day three consisted of the closing pie flight, which was meticulously choreographed, as well as the remaining food fight takes. Healy wrote that after lunch, everyone on set got hit with pies, including the directors and their children.

=== Synopsis and reception ===
The soiled dinner guests pausing the food fight when the chef enters. The woman in the lavender dress (left) throws the first piece of food, and the woman in white (right) is the one who throws the octopus.

The video begins with the country house's residents preparing for the dinner party. As the grandfather clock changes to exactly eight o'clock, the main instrumentation of the song begins, and Travis are seen riding bikes in tuxedos. At the mansion, a young woman and a small monkey watch the band perform the song on a black-and-white television. She soon switches off the television and leaves. The band arrives at the party, and dinner is served, but Travis, puzzled about how to eat their refined meals, cause a few accidents at the table. The young woman tosses a solid piece of food at Healy, who retaliates in the same manner. The other band members also start throwing food, and the other dinner guests soon join the fight.

The video changes to slow motion as a female dinner guest throws an entire octopus across the table that lands on a man's head. The video speeds up again, with everyone except Primrose participating in the food fight. A chef enters the dining room with a trolley cart containing the pies and is shocked to see the chaos. Everyone stops to stare at him for a moment, then throws the pies at him. Throughout the fight, Primrose is shown spotless, but at the video's conclusion, he too is sullied. The final clip of the video shows a female maid (played by Kryst) entering the room and getting soiled with more pies. In an alternate version of the video, a butler is pied at the end instead.

The video was nominated for Best British Video at the 2002 Brit Awards, losing to the video for "21 Seconds" by So Solid Crew.

== Live performance ==
Travis were invited to perform "Sing" on TOTP, where they re-enacted the pie fight during their live performance. The music continued to play in the background during the last 30 seconds of their live performance, as TOTP utilised a miming format that usually prevented musical acts from playing instruments live. Cult music website We Are Cult rated the performance as an honorable mention on their list of the "Top 10 Unforgettable 'Top of the Pops' Performances" in 2017.

== Formats and track listings ==
The single's B-sides include a cover of Queen's "Killer Queen" with guest vocalist Jason Falkner (formerly of the band Jellyfish), as well as Andy Dunlop's vocal debut, "You Don't Know What I'm Like".

All songs were written by Fran Healy, except "Killer Queen" by Freddie Mercury, "Ring Out the Bell" by Dougie Payne, and "You Don't Know What I'm Like" by Andy Dunlop.

- UK and European CD1
1. "Sing" – 3:48
2. "Ring Out the Bell" – 3:44
3. "Killer Queen" – 4:03
- UK and European CD2
1. "Sing" – 3:48
2. "You Don't Know What I'm Like" – 4:11
3. "Beautiful" – 3:45
- UK 7-inch vinyl and cassette single
1. "Sing" – 3:48
2. "Killer Queen" – 4:03
- European CD single—cardboard sleeve
1. "Sing"
2. "Ring Out the Bell"
- Australian CD single
1. "Sing"
2. "Beautiful"
3. "Killer Queen"

== Credits and personnel ==
Credits are adapted from The Independent, the UK CD1 liner notes and The Invisible Band album booklet.

Studios

- Recorded and mixed at Ocean Way Studios (Hollywood, California)
- Strings engineered at AIR Studios (London, England)
- Mastered at Bernie Grundman Mastering (Los Angeles, California)

Travis

- Fran Healy – writing, vocals, guitar
- Andy Dunlop – banjo, piano
- Dougie Payne – bass
- Neil Primrose – drums

Other musicians

- Millennia Strings – strings
- Joby Talbot – string arrangement

Production and recording

- Nigel Godrich – production, mixing
- Darrell Thorp – assistant engineering (Ocean Way)
- Steve Orchard – string engineering
- Bernie Grundman – mastering

== Charts ==
=== Weekly charts ===
Weekly chart performance for "Sing"
Chart (2001–2002)	Peak position
Australia (ARIA)	41
Australia Alternative (ARIA)	1
Austria (Ö3 Austria Top 40)	31
Belgium (Ultratip Bubbling Under Flanders)	8
Belgium (Ultratop 50 Wallonia)	22
Canada (Nielsen SoundScan)	26
Europe (European Hot 100 Singles)	9
France (SNEP)	2
Germany (GfK)	51
Ireland (IRMA)	7
Italy (FIMI)	8
Netherlands (Dutch Top 40 Tipparade)	4
Netherlands (Single Top 100)	82
New Zealand (Recorded Music NZ)	8
Norway (VG-lista)	4
Scotland Singles (OCC)	2
Sweden (Sverigetopplistan)	43
Switzerland (Schweizer Hitparade)	34
UK Singles (OCC)	3
UK Airplay (Music Week)	1
US Adult Alternative Airplay (Billboard)	14
US Alternative Airplay (Billboard)	37

=== Year-end charts ===
2001 year-end chart performance for "Sing"
Chart (2001)	Position
Canada (Nielsen SoundScan)	179
Europe (European Hot 100 Singles)	60
France (SNEP)	53
Ireland (IRMA)	87
New Zealand (RIANZ)	48
UK Singles (OCC)	77
UK Airplay (Music Week)	7

== Certifications ==
Certifications and sales for "Sing"
Region	Certification	Certified units/sales
France (SNEP)	Silver	125,000^{*}
Italy (FIMI)	Gold	50,000^{‡}
Spain (Promusicae)	Gold	30,000^{‡}
New Zealand (RMNZ)	Gold	15,000^{‡}
United Kingdom (BPI) Sales since 2004	Platinum	600,000^{‡}
^{*} Sales figures based on certification alone.^{‡} Sales+streaming figures based on certification alone.

== Release history ==
Release dates and formats for "Sing"
Region	Date	Format(s)	Label(s)	ID	Ref(s).
United Kingdom	April 2001	Radio	Independiente	—N/a	
United States	23 April 2001	Triple A radio	Independiente	—N/a	
United States	24 April 2001	Alternative radio	Independiente	—N/a	
United Kingdom	28 May 2001	CD: CD1	Independiente	ISOM 49MS	
United Kingdom	28 May 2001	CD: CD2	Independiente	ISOM 49SMS	
United Kingdom	28 May 2001	Cassette	Independiente	ISOM 49CS	
Australia	28 May 2001	CD	Independiente	671232.2	
United Kingdom	4 June 2001	7-inch vinyl	Independiente	ISOM 49S	
Europe	2001	CD with cardboard sleeve	Independiente	ISM 671112 1	
Europe	2001	CD: CD1	Independiente	ISM 671112 2	
Europe	2001	CD: CD2	Independiente	ISM 671112 5	
