= More Than Us EP =

More Than Us

EP by Travis
- Released: 30 March 1998
- Recorded: 1997–1998
- Genre: Britpop
- Length: 3:56
- Label: Independiente
- Producer: Steve Lillywhite

Travis chronology
"Happy" (1997)	More Than Us (1998)	"Writing to Reach You" (1999)

More Than Us EP is an extended play by the Scottish rock band Travis, released on the 30 March 1998. It became the group's first UK singles chart top 20 hit and final single to be taken from their debut album "Good Feeling". The tracks "More Than Us", "All I Want to Do Is Rock" and "Funny Thing" are from the band's 1997 debut album Good Feeling. "More Than Us" is known for being the song that influenced their mainstream breakthrough. Both physical releases featured three previously unreleased recordings; the John Lennon cover "Gimme Some Truth", "Beautiful Bird" and "Reason". The EP's artwork, which depicts a rear view of four chairs behind a table, is strikingly similar to the cover for the band's 2000 single, "Coming Around".

== Track listing ==
- UK CD1 / 7" vinyl / cassette
1. "More Than Us" (Single Version) (featuring Anne Dudley) - 3:59
2. "Gimme Some Truth" - 3:16
3. "All I Want to Do Is Rock" (Live Version) (featuring Noel Gallagher) - 4:50
4. "Funny Thing" (Alternative Version) (featuring Tim Simenon) - 3:44
- UK CD2
1. "More Than Us" (Single Version) (featuring Anne Dudley) - 3:59
2. "Beautiful Bird" (Demo) - 6:39
3. "Reason" (featuring Susie Hug) - 3:29
4. "More Than Us" (Acoustic Version) - 4:50

== Charts ==
The EP spent 3 weeks on the UK singles chart, peaking at number 16 in April 1998.
