= Hope (War Child album) =

Compilation album by various artists
- Released: 29 April 2003
- Genres: Pop; rock
- Length: 66:35
- Label: London

War Child charity albums chronology
NME in Association with War Child Presents 1 Love (2002)	Hope (2003)	Help: A Day in the Life (2005)

Hope is a 2003 compilation album released by the War Child charity in conjunction with Daily Mirror to aid the victims of the Iraq War. It features contributions from Travis, New Order, Paul McCartney, David Bowie and George Michael.

== Track listing ==
Hope track listing
No.	Title	Writer(s)	Performed by	Length
1.	"The Beautiful Occupation"	Francis Healy	Travis	3:25
2.	"Knockin' on Heaven's Door"	Bob Dylan	Avril Lavigne	2:51
3.	"Calico Skies"	Paul McCartney	Paul McCartney	2:32
4.	"Everyone Says 'Hi'" (Metro mix)	David Bowie	David Bowie	3:42
5.	"The Grave"	Don McLean	George Michael	3:32
6.	"In the Ghetto"	Mac Davis	Ronan Keating	3:33
7.	"Stand up as People"	Lee Ryan, Octave, Seth Naqui	Lee Ryan from Blue	4:07
8.	"Love's in Need of Love Today"	Stevie Wonder	Beverley Knight	4:33
9.	"Nearer"	Moby	Moby	4:18
10.	"Vietnam"	Jimmy Cliff	New Order	5:09
11.	"Love Is the Answer"	Felix Buxton, Simon Ratcliffe, Winston Foster	Basement Jaxx featuring Yellowman	4:41
12.	"Hold On" (War Child mix)	J. Spaceman	Spiritualized	3:50
13.	"We Gotta Have Peace"	Curtis Mayfield	The Charlatans	3:35
14.	"Ooh Child"	Stan Vincent	Beth Orton	2:59
15.	"Border Song"	Tom McRae	Tom McRae	4:34
16.	"The Wolf Covers Its Tracks"	Billy Bragg	Billy Bragg	4:28
17.	"Peace Train"	Yusuf Islam	Yusuf Islam	3:57
18.	"Keep Hope Alive" (hidden track)		Rev. Jesse Jackson	0:49
