= 12 Memories =

2003 album by Travis

Studio album by Travis
- Released: 13 October 2003
- Recorded: November 2002 – April 2003
- Studios: Crear (Kilberry, Argyll and Bute, Scotland) and Real World (Box, Wiltshire, England)
- Genres: Alternative rock, indie rock
- Length: 44:50
- Labels: Independiente, Epic
- Producers: Travis, Tchad Blake, Steve Orchard

Travis chronology
The Invisible Band (2001)	12 Memories (2003)	Singles (2004)

Singles from 12 Memories
- 1. "Re-Offender" Released: 29 September 2003; 2. "The Beautiful Occupation" Released: 15 December 2003; 3. "Love Will Come Through" Released: 22 March 2004

Professional ratings
Aggregate scores
Source	Rating
Metacritic	64/100
Review scores
Source	Rating
Allmusic	3/5 stars
Blender	3/5 stars
NME	(6/10)
Pitchfork Media	(5.1/10)
Rolling Stone	3/5 stars
Music Box	3/5 stars

12 Memories is the fourth studio album from Scottish alternative rock band Travis. The album was released on 13 October 2003 on Epic Records. In comparison to their other works, the album is more lyrically dark, focusing on issues such as the 2003 Iraq invasion, politicians, psychological crisis and domestic abuse.

== Background and recording ==
Travis drummer Neil Primrose suffered a severe spinal injury in a swimming pool accident in July 2002. The band were forced to take six months off during his recuperation before regrouping. Moving into a cottage on the island of Mull they set up a small studio, and over two weeks, came up with nine new songs that would form the basis of 12 Memories.

Musically, 12 Memories has embraced use of distorted guitars and a more electronic, rockier and even trip hop style. Three singles were released from the album - "Re-Offender", a track that deals with domestic abuse, "The Beautiful Occupation", a song which was inspired by the invasion of Iraq by US and coalition forces in 2003, and "Love Will Come Through", a more traditional Travis song, which was later featured in a marketing campaign by the Post Office. Whilst being titled 12 Memories, there are only eleven tracks on the album, each one of these a "memory". The "12th memory" is actually "Some Sad Song", a hidden track following the last track that criticises the Catholic school system, in which vocalist and songwriter Fran Healy was educated. The album cover is somewhat similar to those of The Beatles's Let It Be (1970) and U2's Pop (1997).

This is the only Travis album without their logo on the album cover. However, their logo can be seen from the album cover, as the visible part of the rear back cover, the Travis logo can be found. The rear back cover is also similar to the cover of "Re-Offender", the lead single. As the album does not display the title on the cover either, a sticker is featured on the case which says the title of the album. Also, a Parental Guidance logo is featured as a sticker on the case.

== Release and reception ==
12 Memories entered the UK charts at #3, with lead single "Re-Offender" scoring the band their fifth Top Ten UK hit at #7. Charting at #48, "The Beautiful Occupation" was their first single to miss the Top 40, although the following single, fan favourite "Love Will Come Through", fared slightly better, charting at #28. Produced by Travis themselves, Tchad Blake, and Steve Orchard, the album marked a move into more organic, moody and political territory for the band. Although this seems to have alienated some fans, the album generally received very positive reviews (for example, "Then, of course, there's Travis and their album 12 Memories [Epic]. You just have to sit there and listen to it all the way through, and it will take you on a real journey. It's like an old album. It's like the Beatles' Revolver [1966]. Fran Healy's voice and lyrics are mesmerizing and beautiful" — Elton John). The album received positive reviews from music critics. At Metacritic, which assigns a normalised rating out of 100 to reviews from mainstream critics, the album received an average score of 64 based on 22 reviews, which indicates "generally favorable reviews".

Yet 12 Memories also saw the band lose ground in the US, where Coldplay had usurped Travis during their 2002 absence. Much later, Healy spoke about the album as a whole being about him working through his own clinical depression, and the twelve memories being twelve reasons for him reaching his depressed state. At the time this wasn't mentioned, but the revelation that Healy was depressed ties in with the band's decision to take longer writing and releasing their next work.

== Track listing ==
All tracks are written by Fran Healy.

No.	Title	Length
1.	"Quicksand"	2:39
2.	"The Beautiful Occupation"	3:45
3.	"Re-Offender"	3:48
4.	"Peace the Fuck Out"	2:55
5.	"How Many Hearts"	4:46
6.	"Paperclips"	3:36
7.	"Somewhere Else"	3:13
8.	"Love Will Come Through"	3:40
9.	"Mid-Life Krysis"	3:39
10.	"Happy to Hang Around"	3:34
11.	"Walking Down the Hill" ("Walking Down the Hill" ends at 3:54, followed by hidden track "Some Sad Song", which begins at 4:48)	9:21

Japanese Bonus Tracks
No.	Title	Length
12.	"Definition of Wrong"	3:33
13.	"12th Memory"	4:38

== Personnel ==
- Fran Healy – vocals, guitar, piano
- Andy Dunlop – guitar, banjo, backing vocals
- Dougie Payne – bass guitar, backing vocals
- Neil Primrose – drums

== Charts ==
=== Weekly charts ===
Weekly chart performance
Chart (2003)	Peak position
Australian Albums (ARIA)	42
Austrian Albums (Ö3 Austria)	8
Belgian Albums (Ultratop Flanders)	38
Belgian Alternative Albums (Ultratop Flanders)	15
Belgian Albums (Ultratop Wallonia)	38
Canadian Albums (Nielsen SoundScan)	42
Danish Albums (Hitlisten)	8
Dutch Albums (Album Top 100)	64
Dutch Alternative Albums (Alternative Top 30)	5
European Albums (Billboard)	4
French Albums (SNEP)	19
German Albums (Offizielle Top 100)	9
Irish Albums (IRMA)	17
Italian Albums (FIMI)	22
Japanese Albums (Oricon)	19
New Zealand Albums (RMNZ)	34
Norwegian Albums (VG-lista)	4
Polish Albums (ZPAV)	49
Scottish Albums (Official Charts)	2
Swedish Albums (Sverigetopplistan)	22
Swiss Albums (Schweizer Hitparade)	8
UK Albums (Official Charts)	3
US Billboard 200	41

=== Year-end charts ===
Year-end chart performance
Chart (2003)	Position
Swiss Albums (Schweizer Hitparade)	93
UK Albums (OCC)	84

== Certifications ==
Certifications
Region	Certification	Certified units/sales
Norway (IFPI Norway)	Gold	20,000^{*}
United Kingdom (BPI)	Platinum	300,000^{^}
^{*} Sales figures based on certification alone.^{^} Shipments figures based on certification alone.
