= Closer (Travis song) =

2007 single by Travis

Single by Travis

from the album The Boy with No Name
- B-side: "The Day To Day"; "The Great Unknown"; "This Love"
- Released: 23 April 2007
- Length: 4:00
- Label: Independiente; Epic (US)
- Songwriter: Fran Healy
- Producer: Nigel Godrich

Travis singles chronology
"Walking in the Sun" (2004)	"Closer" (2007)	"Selfish Jean" (2007)

Music video
- "Closer" on YouTube

"Closer" is a song by Scottish band Travis, released as the first single from their fifth studio album, The Boy with No Name (2007), on 23 April 2007. The single peaked at number 10 on the UK Singles Chart and became the band's second chart-topper on the Scottish Singles Chart, after "Coming Around".

The song is featured in the video game by EA Sports, FIFA 08.

== Music video ==
The music video features the band as clerks in a supermarket with Healy as the beaver mascot. When fed up with his job, he goes inside and starts singing on the speaker system. Payne, who was working at the register completely bored, takes out his bass and Dunlop and Primrose are dancing with the customers. When their boss, Ben Stiller in a cameo, hears music, he tries to find out where it comes from but it stops as soon as he looks out of his office. The music then resumes when Stiller goes back to his office. The video ends with the band leaving the supermarket together. The only instrument that appears is Payne's bass, whilst the rest of the band have nothing. Fran Healy is seen wearing a Radio Clyde T-shirt that reads "Radio Clyde 261". The T-shirt actually originated from Frank Zappa who wore a red version of the shirt previously. The video was directed by Michael Baldwin, who has also directed videos for Gabriella Cilmi, Dave Matthews Band, and Melanie C, among others.

== Track listings ==
- UK enhanced CD single
1. "Closer"
2. "The Day to Day"
3. "Closer" (video)
- UK 7-inch single 1

A. "Closer"
B. "The Great Unknown"

- UK 7-inch single 2

A. "Closer"
B. "This Love"

- European CD single
1. "Closer"
2. "The Day to Day"
- US EP
1. "Closer"
2. "The Day to Day"
3. "This Love"
- European Limited Edition EP
1. "Closer"
2. "The Day to Day"
3. "The Great Unknown"
4. "This Love"
5. "Closer (Video)"

== Charts ==
Chart (2007)	Peak position
Belgium (Ultratip Bubbling Under Flanders)	20
Czech Republic Airplay (ČNS IFPI)	85
Germany (GfK)	69
Norway (VG-lista)	8
Scotland Singles (OCC)	1
Switzerland (Schweizer Hitparade)	32
UK Singles (OCC)	10
