= Walking in the Sun =

2004 single by Travis

Single by Travis

from the album Singles
- B-side: "Bring Me Round", "I Forget My Name", "Life and Soul of the Party"
- Released: 18 October 2004
- Recorded: 2004
- Length: 2:58
- Label: Independiente
- Songwriter: Fran Healy
- Producer: Mike Hedges

Travis singles chronology
"Love Will Come Through" (2004)	"Walking in the Sun" (2004)	"Closer" (2007)

"Walking in the Sun" is a song by Scottish indie rock band Travis. It was released on 18 October 2004 as the only single from their compilation album, Singles. The single peaked at number 20 in the UK Singles Chart. Like the Singles album cover, the single artwork shows photographs of the band.

== Music video ==
The music video features Healy walking down Pitshanger Lane, Ealing with hidden booby traps and obstacles. He cheats death numerous times before meeting the Grim Reaper. The other members of the band are seen at the end of the lane, performing the song while waiting for Healy to arrive.

== Track listings ==
- UK CD1
1. "Walking In The Sun" - 3:01
2. "I Forget My Name" - 2:50
3. "Life And Soul Of The Party" - 3:21
4. "Walking In The Sun" (Video)
- 7" Vinyl
1. "Walking In The Sun" - 3:01
2. "Bring Me Round" - 3:37

== Charts ==
Chart (2004)	Peak position
Scottish Singles Sales (Official Charts)	13
Germany (GfK)	94
Switzerland (Schweizer Hitparade)	71
UK Singles (Official Charts)	20
