= Why Does It Always Rain on Me? =

1999 single by Travis

Single by Travis

from the album The Man Who
- Released: 2 August 1999
- Genre: Post-Britpop
- Length: 4:25 (album version); 3:14 (radio edit)
- Label: Independiente
- Songwriter: Fran Healy
- Producer: Mike Hedges

Travis singles chronology
"Driftwood" (1999)	"Why Does It Always Rain on Me?" (1999)	"Turn" (1999)

Music video
- "Why Does It Always Rain on Me?" on YouTube

"Why Does It Always Rain on Me?" is a song by Scottish band Travis from their second studio album, The Man Who (1999). Written by frontman Fran Healy, produced by Mike Hedges and recorded at Chateau de la Rouge Motte in Domfront en Poiraie and Abbey Road Studios in London, England. It was released as the third single from The Man Who, after "Writing to Reach You" and "Driftwood". Healy stated that he wrote the song whilst on holiday in Israel whilst looking for winter sunshine, but during his holiday, it rained the whole time.

Considered by Songwriting Magazine as their breakthrough single, it reached number four on the Scottish Singles Charts and number 10 on the UK Singles Charts. It achieved commercial success internationally, peaking within the top 20 in Australia and achieving moderate success in Europe, North America and New Zealand. In a poll by listeners of Absolute Radio, the song was ranked 62nd on a list of the top 100 songs of the 1990s.

== Background ==
Fran Healy started writing the song while on holiday in Eilat, Israel. According to Healy, he was looking for some winter sun when his accountant suggested Eilat, which is known for its hot, rainless weather even during winter time. However, on the way to the hotel, it began to rain, which lasted until he left a week later.

Healy said he wanted to write the song, and wrote the second verse starting with "Why does it always rain on you? Is it because I picked you up in '92?" but decided that it wasn't good and changed it. He said that the line "Is it because I lied when I was 17?" refers to the time when he lied about his age to get a job behind the bar at the biggest club in Glasgow in 1989. The rest of the song was written six months later in Madrid at 1 o'clock in morning. He had just spoken to his manager on the phone who assured him that his career is taking off, but he felt things were not working for him, and wrote the lines "I can't sleep tonight / Everybody's saying everything is alright" and "I can't stand myself" which refers to him hating himself as well as not being able to stand up. "I'm being held up by invisible men" refers to people in the music industry who propped him up as well as holding him up like robbers.

== Music video ==
The music video was directed by John Hardwick and filmed in Cornwall, with scenes filmed on Bodmin Moor. The pool of water that Healy (actually a stuntman) jumps into is part of a disused mining quarry known locally as "Gold Diggings" in Craddock Moor which is on the edge of Bodmin Moor. The video features the band in a rain-soaked setting, with the band having locked frontman Healy, wearing a kilt, in the trunk of a 1970s Vauxhall Viva. Healy escapes, and chases the rest of the band into a disused mining quarry. The video continues with the band being shown in a floating living room, performing the song. The video ends with the living room floating away. It does not actually rain at any point during the video.

The underwater scenes were filmed by underwater cinematographer Mark Silk, in the tank at Oceanic SW Limited, Honiton, Devon. (The company went into administration in January 2019.) The director of photography of the video was Ben Davis with Derrin Schlesinger the producer.

== Live performances ==
When Travis began to perform this song at the 1999 Glastonbury Festival, after being sunny for several hours, it began to rain exactly when the first line was sung, and stopped at the end of the song. Their performance was a talking point of the festival, and their career took off afterwards. Their single was released a month after Glastonbury, and it reached No. 10 on the UK Singles Chart; it also helped push the album The Man Who to No. 1.

Despite the performance's reputation, Healy was at the time disappointed in the band's performance, believing they had blown their opportunity with an average showing. "I can't hear myself. I'm out of tune. Oh no, it just started raining and everyone's really upset at me," Healy recalled thinking. Lead guitarist Andy Dunlop said, "People looked miserable and it was raining. It wasn't really one of the things that you felt, 'Oh, this is history!'" However, the day after, the band saw Jo Whiley and John Peel on television name Travis the performance of the weekend.

== Track listings ==
UK CD1

1. "Why Does It Always Rain on Me?"
2. "Village Man"
3. "Driftwood" (live at the Link Café, Glasgow)

UK CD2

1. "Why Does It Always Rain on Me?"
2. "The Urge for Going"
3. "Slide Show" (live at the Link Café, Glasgow)

UK cassette single

1. "Why Does It Always Rain on Me?"
2. "Village Man"

European maxi-CD single

1. "Why Does It Always Rain on Me?"
2. "Village Man"
3. "Driftwood" (live at the Link Café, Glasgow)
4. "The Urge for Going"

Australian and New Zealand maxi-CD single

1. "Why Does It Always Rain on Me?" – 4:25
2. "Village Man" – 3:18
3. "Driftwood" (live at the Link Café, Glasgow) – 4:06
4. "...Baby One More Time" (live at the Bay Tavern, Robin Hood's Bay) – 3:30
5. Multimedia

Japanese EP

1. "Why Does It Always Rain on Me?"
2. "Village Man"
3. "Driftwood" (live at the Link Café, Glasgow)
4. "The Urge for Going"
5. "Slide Show" (live at the Link Café, Glasgow)

== Credits and personnel ==
Credits are lifted from the UK CD1 liner notes.

Studios

- Produced at Chateau de la Rouge Motte (Domfront en Poiraie, France) and Abbey Road (London, England)
- Mixed at Mayfair Studios (London, England)

Personnel

- Fran Healy – writing
- Sarah Wilson – cello
- Mike Hedges – production
- Ian Grimble – co-production
- Nigel Godrich – mixing
- Blue Source – art direction
- Stefan Ruiz – photography

== Charts ==
=== Weekly charts ===
Chart (1999–2000)	Peak position
Australia (ARIA)	11
Belgium (Ultratip Bubbling Under Flanders)	15
Canada Adult Contemporary (RPM)	57
Europe (Eurochart Hot 100)	39
Finland (Suomen virallinen lista)	18
Germany (GfK)	56
Ireland (IRMA)	26
Netherlands (Dutch Top 40)	31
Netherlands (Single Top 100)	73
New Zealand (Recorded Music NZ)	20
Scottish Singles Sales (Official Charts)	4
Switzerland (Schweizer Hitparade)	87
UK Singles (Official Charts)	10
UK Rock & Metal (Official Charts)	1
US Adult Pop Airplay (Billboard)	36
US Alternative Airplay (Billboard)	35

=== Year-end charts ===
Chart (1999)	Position
UK Singles (OCC)	154
UK Airplay (Music Week)	29

Chart (2000)	Position
Australia (ARIA)	81

== Certifications ==
Region	Certification	Certified units/sales
Australia (ARIA)	Gold	35,000^{^}
New Zealand (RMNZ)	Gold	15,000^{‡}
United Kingdom (BPI)	Platinum	600,000^{‡}
^{^} Shipments figures based on certification alone.^{‡} Sales+streaming figures based on certification alone.

== Release history ==
Region	Date	Format(s)	Label(s)	Ref.
United Kingdom	2 August 1999	CD; cassette	Independiente	
Japan	8 September 1999	CD	Independiente; Epic	
United States	7 March 2000	Alternative radio	Epic	
United States	3 April 2000	Hot adult contemporary; modern adult contemporary radio	Epic	
