= Wreckorder =

Studio album by Fran Healy
- Released: 4 October 2010
- Recorded: 2009–2010
- Studio: Haus Studios and Hobo Sound
- Genre: Rock, soft rock
- Length: 33:58
- Label: Wreckord Label
- Producer: Emery Dobyns, Fran Healy

Singles from Wreckorder
- 1. "Holiday" Released: 17 September 2010; 2. "Buttercups" Released: 4 October 2010; 3. "Sing Me to Sleep" Released: 7 January 2011; 4. "Fly in the Ointment" Released: 21 February 2011

Wreckorder is the debut solo album from Travis frontman, Fran Healy. The album was released on 4 October 2010, on Healy's private label, WreckordLabel. The album was recorded in late 2009 in Berlin and New York City, before being completed in Vermont in early 2010. It was produced by Emery Dobyns, with contributions from Paul McCartney, Neko Case and Noah and the Whale's Tom Hobden. The album is available in standard and deluxe editions, and debuted at number 76 on the UK Albums Chart.

== Background ==
The cover for the album was photographed by Tim Barber. In an interview for his official website, Healy claimed that "I wanted a portrait of what I looked like at that very second. I wanted to show that I was no longer the little boy that appeared on the inside sleeve of The Man Who. I did think about other images, but they just didn't feel right. This one looked particularly cool."

As a thank you for his work on the album, Healy honoured Paul McCartney by becoming a vegetarian. "My wife and I were sitting at the table, thinking of a way to thank Paul, and I suggested becoming a vegetarian. As our son is already a vegetarian, all it required was jumping onto the same boat. When I met Paul at one of his gigs in Berlin, I told him and he was visibly flabbergasted. Three days later the FedEx man delivered three Linda McCartney cookbooks."

In August 2010, Healy announced that the first single from the album would be "Buttercups". In an interview for Spin magazine, Healy revealed: "'Buttercups' was written about an experience in my art school days, when my then girlfriend turned her nose up at flowers I had picked for her. I couldn't afford fancy roses, so I thought that hand-picked flowers would be more romantic. She didn't think so. That relationship didn't last long."

== Critical reception ==
Professional ratings
Aggregate scores
Source	Rating
Metacritic	66/100
Review scores
Source	Rating
AbsolutePunk	4.5/5 stars
AllMusic	3/5 stars
antiMusic	3/5 stars
BBC Music	3/5 stars
Decoy Music	4.5/5 stars
Filter	83%
Glide Magazine	4.5/5 stars
musicOMH	3/5 stars
PopMatters	7/10 stars
Slant Magazine	3/5 stars

Wreckorder received generally favourable reviews from music critics. At Metacritic, which assigns a normalized rating out of 100 to reviews from mainstream critics, the album received an average score of 66, based on 13 reviews.

== Track listing ==
No.	Title	Length
1.	"In the Morning"	2:53
2.	"Anything"	4:14
3.	"Sing Me to Sleep" (featuring Neko Case)	3:59
4.	"Fly in the Ointment"	3:13
5.	"As It Comes"	2:45
6.	"Buttercups"	3:56
7.	"Shadow Boxing"	4:35
8.	"Holiday"	3:42
9.	"Rocking Chair"	3:06
10.	"Moonshine"	2:35

Deluxe edition bonus track
No.	Title	Length
11.	"Sierra Leone"	3:11

Super deluxe edition bonus tracks
No.	Title	Length
11.	"Sierra Leone"	3:11
12.	"The Making of Wreckorder" (Video)

iTunes bonus tracks
No.	Title	Length
11.	"Sierra Leone"	3:11
12.	"As It Comes" (Demo)	2:56
13.	"Zebra"	3:23

Japanese bonus tracks
No.	Title	Length
11.	"Sierra Leone"	3:11
12.	"Buttercups" (Instrumental)	3:56
13.	"Robot (Skit for Comedy Show)"	2:29
