= Side (song) =

2001 single by Travis

Single by Travis

from the album The Invisible Band
- B-side: "Driftwood" (live); "All the Young Dudes" (live); "You're a Big Girl Now"; "Ancient Train"
- Written: 2000
- Released: 14 August 2001
- Studio: Ocean Way (Los Angeles)
- Length: 3:59
- Label: Independiente
- Songwriter: Fran Healy
- Producer: Nigel Godrich

Travis singles chronology
"Sing" (2001)	"Side" (2001)	"Flowers in the Window" (2002)

"Side" is a song by Scottish rock band Travis, released as the second single from their third studio album, The Invisible Band (2001). Frontman Fran Healy began writing the song by composing a rap, which he would later remove, and penning a riff that would support it. In February 2000, he completed the song's lyrics, which describe how everyone shares life and explains that there is no greater existence for anyone who seeks it, as everyone shares the same "side" of life. The song was released as a radio single in the United States in August 2001 and was issued in the United Kingdom the following month.

Produced by Nigel Godrich, "Side" received mixed reviews from music critics and peaked at number 14 on the UK singles chart, becoming a top-50 hit in Ireland, Italy, and New Zealand as well as on two US Billboard charts. The single releases include live versions of "Driftwood" and Mott the Hoople's "All the Young Dudes", as well as a cover of the Bob Dylan song "You're a Big Girl Now". The song's music video has a UFO theme and features Travis being abducted by aliens after performing the song.

== Background and composition ==
Writing about the song's origin on the band's official website, Fran Healy recalled that the first part of "Side" that he conceived was a rap segment, which he would later discard. After completing the rap, he composed the riff and music over the next few weeks so it would complement the rap verse, toying around with the lyrics until penning the final result in February 2000 during a plane trip. It was during this trip that he also created the name of the parent album, The Invisible Band. Healy has stated that "Side" is about how people think that there is a better life for them somewhere in the world, but in actuality, no one is better off than anyone else as life is shared by everyone; in other words, everyone stands on one "side" of life. Many cliché expressions make up the lyric, such as "The grass is always greener on the other side".

== Critical reception ==
Reviewing The Invisible Band on AllMusic, MacKenzie Wilson wrote that "Side" was "instantly endearing" and noted its "Beatlesque" lyrics. Andy Frankowski of Drowned in Sound compared the track's sound to that of the band's previous album, The Man Who (1999), specifically mentioning the guitars backing the lyrics "grass is always greener on the other side / the neighbour's got a new car that you wanna drive". Pitchfork writer Kristin Sage Rockermann said that she liked the composition but criticised the "cliché" lyrics, such as "The grass is always greener on the other side" and "There is no wrong, there is no right". In 2015, music website Pop Rescue was also ambivalent toward the song's lyrical content, particularly the chorus, and attributed the song's lukewarm reception on the UK singles chart to the lack of a "catchy" refrain.

== Music video ==
The video for the song has a UFO theme. It begins with three boys looking for UFOs through their bedroom skylight. When one hovers overhead, they go outside and follow it, only for it to land in a cavern in the desert, where they find Travis performing the song. At the end of the video, the band are abducted by aliens while they are performing out in the desert. The clip ends with a newspaper article regarding their disappearance.

== Track listings ==
The single's B-sides include two tracks taken from a gig the group played at the Glasgow Barrowlands in June 2001, including their hit single "Driftwood" and a cover of the Mott the Hoople song "All the Young Dudes" (written by David Bowie), which features lead vocals by Dougie Payne. Another issue of the single includes a cover of the Bob Dylan song "You're a Big Girl Now".

- UK CD1 and European CD single 1
1. "Side" – 3:56
2. "Driftwood" (live at Barrowlands) – 3:54
3. "All the Young Dudes" (live at Barrowlands) – 4:04
- UK CD2
1. "Side" – 3:57
2. "You're a Big Girl Now" – 4:45
3. "Ancient Train" – 2:35
- UK 7-inch and cassette single

A. "Side"
B. "All the Young Dudes" (live at Barrowlands)

- UK digital download and European CD single 2
1. "Side" – 3:56
2. "Ancient Train" – 2:35
- Australian CD single
1. "Side"
2. "Ancient Train"
3. "Driftwood" (live at Barrowlands)
4. "All the Young Dudes" (live at Barrowlands)

== Credits and personnel ==
Credits are adapted from The Invisible Band booklet.

Studios

- Recorded and mixed at Ocean Way Studios (Los Angeles)
- Mastered at Bernie Grundman Mastering (Los Angeles, California)

Personnel

- Fran Healy – writing
- Nigel Godrich – production, mixing
- Darrell Thorp – assistant engineer at Ocean Way Studios
- Bernie Grundman – mastering

== Charts ==
=== Weekly charts ===
Chart (2001–2002)	Peak position
Australia (ARIA)	71
Europe (Eurochart Hot 100)	49
France (SNEP)	53
Germany (GfK)	86
Ireland (IRMA)	33
Italy (FIMI)	13
Netherlands (Single Top 100)	97
New Zealand (Recorded Music NZ)	20
Scotland Singles (OCC)	9
Switzerland (Schweizer Hitparade)	52
UK Singles (OCC)	14
US Adult Alternative Airplay (Billboard)	14
US Adult Pop Airplay (Billboard)	19

=== Year-end charts ===
Chart (2002)	Position
US Adult Top 40 (Billboard)	54

== Release history ==
Region	Date	Format(s)	Label(s)	Ref.
United States	14 August 2001	Alternative radio	Independiente; Epic	
United Kingdom	17 September 2001	CD; cassette	Independiente	
United Kingdom	24 September 2001	7-inch vinyl	Independiente	
Australia	8 October 2001	CD	Independiente	
United States	22 October 2001	Triple A radio	Independiente; Epic	
