= Neil Primrose (musician) =

Scottish musician

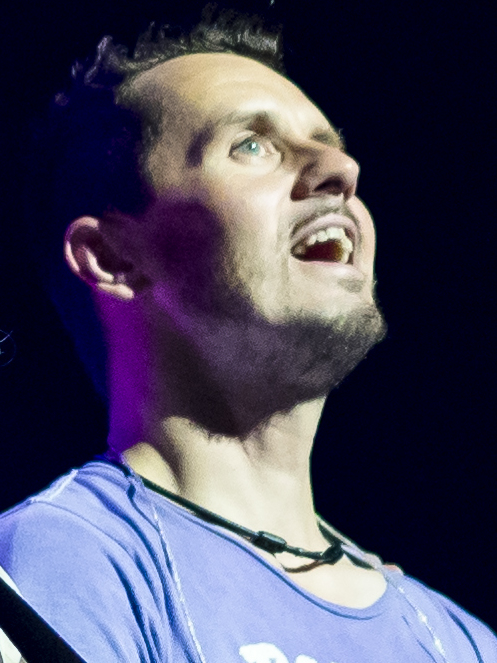
- Primrose performing with Travis in Singapore, 2014

Background information
- Born: Neil Primrose; 20 February 1972 (age 54); Cumbernauld, Dunbartonshire, Scotland
- Origin: Glasgow, Scotland
- Genres: Rock, Britpop, Alternative rock
- Occupation: Musician
- Instruments: Drums, percussion
- Years active: 1989–present
- Member of: Travis

Neil Primrose (born 20 February 1972) is the drummer of the Scottish rock band Travis.

== Early life ==
Primrose was born in Cumbernauld. His father, a power station engineer, was posted to Middlesbrough, and this was followed by a series of moves across the northeast of England during the first ten years of Primrose's life. At the age of 15 at high school in Glasgow he was playing drums with friends in local bands.

== Career ==
=== Travis (1989–present) ===
In 1989 at the age of 17, Primrose started his drumming career when he was going for as many auditions as possible and looking for like-minded players to form a group.

This led to him joining the band Glass Onion with Andy Dunlop along with brothers Chris and Geoff Martyn in 1990. After a while of looking for success, the line-up changed with Fran Healy joining the line-up in 1991 and the group then splitting with the Martyn brothers and Dougie Payne soon joining the band as the bassist in 1994. Eventually, the name of the band was changed to Travis.

Unlike the other three members of the band, Primrose was not a student at the Glasgow School of Art, instead working various jobs and studying computer science for a pre-degree course. Initially, Travis rehearsed in The Horse Shoe Bar where Primrose and Healy had met for the first time. The material for their first two albums was, in part, written and refined here. Travis moved to London in late spring 1996 and lived, rehearsed and toured from their North London base for many years.

Travis' début album Good Feeling was released in 1997 with positive review, but lukewarm performance in the charts. Their 1999 follow-up, The Man Who, proved to be far more successful, selling millions of copies worldwide, shortly followed by The Invisible Band in 2001. During this period, Travis had several UK hit singles, including "Sing" and "Why Does It Always Rain on Me?".

Before the recording of Travis' fourth album, 12 Memories, Primrose suffered a life-threatening spine injury while he was swimming on holiday in France. This led to the cancellation of several subsequent tour dates – most significantly a headline slot at V Festival. Primrose made a full recovery and was back on stage and recording with the band within months – including Isle of Wight Festival and Live 8 in 2005. In 2024, Travis released their 10th studio album.

== Other projects ==
Primrose has played drums on the Canadian musician Ron Sexsmith's seventh album Retriever and other individual album tracks, along with albums by Jamie Scott, Yusuf Islam, Magne F and Cyril Paulus. In Scotland, Primrose plays with the MOVE Project along with various artists on the Wild Biscuit label.

== Personal life ==
Primrose is married to Esther, and has two daughters.

In 2007, Primrose gained his first racing licence and has since driven in many racing events including the Le Mans Classic and the SPA 25Hr FunCup.
