= Flowers in the Window =

2002 single by Travis

Single by Travis

from the album The Invisible Band
- B-side: "Here Comes the Sun" (live); "A Little Bit of Soul"; "Central Station"; "No Cigar"
- Written: June 1998 (France)
- Released: 25 March 2002
- Studio: Ocean Way (Los Angeles); AIR (London, England)
- Length: 3:41
- Label: Independiente
- Songwriter: Fran Healy
- Producer: Nigel Godrich

Travis singles chronology
"Side" (2001)	"Flowers in the Window" (2002)	"Re-Offender" (2003)

"Flowers in the Window" is a song from Scottish rock band Travis' third studio album, The Invisible Band (2001). Frontman Fran Healy wrote the song during recording sessions for the band's previous album, The Man Who (1999), coming up with the title by looking at British audio engineer Mike Hedges' flower garden. Released as the album's third and final single on 25 March 2002, the song debuted and peaked at number 18 on the UK Singles Chart, reached number 35 in Ireland, and also charted in Australia, Germany, and Switzerland. Several formats of the single contain a live cover version of the Beatles' song "Here Comes the Sun".

== Background ==
According to Fran Healy, he wrote "Flowers in the Window" during June 1998 in France, at Mike Hedges' recording studio while Travis were recording their previous album, The Man Who. When Hedges told Healy that every artist who had recorded at his studio wrote a song there, Healy refused to do so because he "didn't feel like it". Healy had previous written songs alone in his room, but one day, he sat at Hedges' piano and composed the opening riff. He then transferred this riff to his guitar and came up with most of the song's melody and its hook, which he wanted to be six syllables. Upon looking outside at Hedges' garden, he came up with the hook and title: "Flowers in the Window".

Later that night, Healy stayed at the studio while the rest of the band were out drinking. After they returned inebriated and went to sleep, Healy heard what he thought was someone choking on vomit, and he ran around the chateau searching for whoever was making this noise. Eventually, he found bassist Dougie Payne vomiting out his bedroom window. Perturbed by this incident, Healy returned to his room, wrote the song's lyrics on the back of an envelope in 10 minutes, and cried when he recited them. He explained on the band's website, "I was aware for the first time that a good distraction is necessary in writing lyrics. Or not being con[s]cious of what I'm doing is required if it is to have that magic."

Although uncredited on the album, "Flowers in the Window" was co-written by Paul McCartney. In an interview for Rate Your Music, Healy explained, "I met McCartney whilst recording a television programme and I played him an unfinished track from the new album. He said: 'That's a great little song.' He helped us finish the ending, but we didn't give him a credit on the sleeve."

== Music video ==
The video features the band walking around a small town where all the residents are pregnant women. The band enter a clinic where women are staying and begin to perform the song. A chained-up man in distress appears at the end of the video. An alternate version of the video also uses clips from the movie Saved!.

== Live performances ==
During live performances of the song, it is typically dedicated to members of the band or stage crew who have reached a significant moment in a relationship. For example, during the 12 Memories tour in 2003, it was dedicated to the lighting manager who had just had a child. In 2007, whilst playing at the Hammersmith Apollo, it was dedicated to their touring pianist Claes Björklund, who had become engaged the day before.

== Track listings ==
UK CD1

1. "Flowers in the Window"
2. "Here Comes the Sun" (live at the Top of the Pops Awards 2001)
3. "A Little Bit of Soul"

UK CD2

1. "Flowers in the Window"
2. "Central Station"
3. "No Cigar"

UK 7-inch single

A. "Flowers in the Window"
B. "Here Comes the Sun" (live at the Top of the Pops Awards 2001)

UK cassette single

1. "Flowers in the Window"
2. "A Little Bit of Soul"

European CD single

1. "Flowers in the Window"
2. "No Cigar"

Australian CD single

1. "Flowers in the Window"
2. "Here Comes the Sun" (live at the Top of the Pops Awards 2001)
3. "A Little Bit of Soul"
4. "No Cigar"

== Credits and personnel ==
Credits are adapted from The Invisible Band album booklet.

Studios

- Recorded at Ocean Way Studios (Los Angeles) and AIR Studios (London, England)
- Mixed at Ocean Way Studios (Los Angeles)
- Mastered at Bernie Grundman Mastering (Los Angeles, California)

Personnel

- Fran Healy – writing
- Nigel Godrich – production, mixing
- Darrell Thorp – assistant engineer at Ocean Way Studios
- Jon Bailey – assistant engineer at Air Studios
- Bernie Grundman – mastering

== Charts ==
Chart (2002)	Peak position
Australia (ARIA)	92
Europe (Eurochart Hot 100)	100
Germany (GfK)	98
Ireland (IRMA)	35
Scotland Singles (OCC)	9
Switzerland (Schweizer Hitparade)	93
UK Singles (OCC)	18

== Certifications ==
Region	Certification	Certified units/sales
United Kingdom (BPI)	Silver	200,000^{‡}
^{‡} Sales+streaming figures based on certification alone.

== Release history ==
Region	Date	Format(s)	Label(s)	Ref.
United Kingdom	25 March 2002	CD; cassette	Independiente	
United Kingdom	1 April 2002	7-inch vinyl	Independiente	
United States	1 April 2002	Triple A radio	Independiente	
United States	15 April 2002	Hot adult contemporary radio	Independiente	
Australia	6 May 2002	CD	Independiente	
