= Love Will Come Through =

2004 single by Travis

Single by Travis

from the album 12 Memories
- Released: 22 March 2004
- Length: 3:40
- Label: Independiente
- Songwriter: Fran Healy
- Producer: Steve Orchard

Travis singles chronology
"The Beautiful Occupation" (2003)	"Love Will Come Through" (2004)	"Walking in the Sun" (2004)

"Love Will Come Through" is the third single released from Scottish rock band Travis's fourth studio album, 12 Memories (2003). The single peaked at number 28 on the UK Singles Chart.

== Background ==
The song was originally composed for the Moonlight Mile soundtrack. It appeared in the movie trailer for Garden State in 2004, as well as the final, unaired episode of Wonderfalls. The song later appeared in Grey's Anatomy. The song is considered a return to the more recognizable Travis sound, since the last two singles represented a darker, experimental side.

== Lyrics ==
Fran Healy described the song as "a song about love, not in the classic context of that sort of Hollywood love, you know the one that you see in the pictures "I love you, I love you too", it's not like that. It's love that you have with your mum and your dad and your friends and stuff, love that equals hope in the face of everything, the love that conquers all, and its dedicated to that love".

== Music videos ==
Two videos were made for the song. The official video was directed by Arni & Kinski, and was filmed in the Warsaw district of Praga. It features the band performing the song in a social club to a group of family and friends. The alternate version, referred to as the "Haar Schnitt" video, was directed by Anton Corbijn, and features footage of Fran Healy and other members of the band during their home life.

== Track listing ==
- UK CD
1. "Love Will Come Through" - 3:40
2. "Know Nothing" - 3:04
3. "Good For Nothing" - 4:32
4. "Love Will Come Through" ("Haar Schnitt" Video)
- 7" Vinyl
1. "Love Will Come Through" - 3:40
2. "Good For Nothing" - 4:32

A track called "Know Nothing" had been featured on the 2005 romantic drama film A Lot like Love starring Amanda Peet and Ashton Kutcher and also included on the movie's soundtrack.

== Charts ==
Chart (2004)	Peak position
Scotland Singles (OCC)	20
UK Singles (OCC)	28
