= U16 Girls =

Single by Travis

from the album Good Feeling
- Released: 1 April 1997
- Recorded: 1996–1997
- Genre: Britpop
- Length: 4:00
- Label: Independiente
- Songwriter(s): Fran Healy
- Producer(s): Steve Lillywhite

Travis singles chronology
"All I Want to Do is Rock" (1996)	"U16 Girls" (1997)	"Tied to the 90s" (1997)

"U16 Girls" is the second single released from British rock band Travis' debut album, Good Feeling. The single was released on 1 April 1997 in the United Kingdom.

== Background ==
In an interview with NME, Fran Healy described the song as, "A tongue-in-cheek warning about the dangers of getting into a relationship with a girl who, despite looking much older, is actually under the legal age of consent." As the age of consent in Scotland is 16, Healy named the song "U16 Girls". The single's artwork depicts a surfboard which was designed by The Stone Roses guitarist John Squire. The surfboard is decorated with lyrics from Beach Boys songs. Background vocals were provided by The Joyous Lake Singers. The single charted at number 40 on the UK singles chart.

== Track listing ==
UK CD single

1. "U16 Girls" (Featuring The Joyous Lake Singers) – 4:00
2. "Hazy Shades of Gold" – 3:18
3. "Good Time Girls" – 4:09
4. "Good Feeling" (4-Track) – 3:55

7" Vinyl / Cassette single

1. "U16 Girls" (Featuring The Joyous Lake Singers) – 4:00
2. "Hazy Shades of Gold" – 3:18
3. "Good Time Girls" – 4:09
