= Turn (Travis song) =

1999 single by Travis

Single by Travis

from the album The Man Who
- B-side: "River"; "Days of Our Lives"; "We Are Monkeys"; "Baby One More Time" (live)
- Released: 8 November 1999
- Studio: Chateau de la Rouge Motte (Normandy, France); Abbey Road (London, England)
- Length: 4:23 (album version); 3:21 (radio edit)
- Label: Independiente
- Songwriter: Fran Healy
- Producer: Mike Hedges

Travis singles chronology
| "Why Does It Always Rain on Me?" (1999) | "Turn" (1999) | "Coming Around" (2000) |

"Turn" is a song by Scottish rock band Travis from their second album The Man Who (1999). The song was written by frontman Fran Healy, produced by Mike Hedges and recorded at Chateau de la Rouge Motte in Normandy, and at Abbey Road Studios in London. It was released as the fourth single, and lyrically explores the themes of human irrepressibility. Like the rest of The Man Who, "Turn" is noted for its a more mellow and softer tone in comparison to the bands earlier works.

"Turn" received acclaim from contemporary music critics, who referred to the song as a "unifying anthem" and praised its easy listening capabilities. The song became the band's highest-charting single up until that point, reaching number eight on the UK Singles Charts and number two on the Scottish Singles Charts. It was a success in several other countries as well, reaching number 28 in Ireland, number 37 in New Zealand, and number 60 in Sweden.

== Music video ==
Two music videos were shot for the single. The first video, included on the group's Singles DVD, was directed by Ringan Ledwidge and features Fran Healy engaged in a push-up contest. This video was filmed in Hackney on the Nightingale Estate. The estate has since been demolished. British actress Julie Smith as well as British actor Stephen Graham were featured in the video. The second featured a staged performance by the band.

== B-sides ==
The release of the single was accompanied by a cover of Britney Spears's hit single "...Baby One More Time". Spears herself heard the Travis version while shopping, and commented by saying it was 'a total shock' and was 'a very good cover'.

== Track listings ==
- UK CD1
1. "Turn"
2. "River"
3. "Days of Our Lives"
4. "Turn" (video)
- UK CD2
1. "Turn"
2. "We Are Monkeys"
3. "Baby One More Time" (live from the Bay Tavern, Robin Hood's Bay)
- UK cassette single
1. "Turn"
2. "Days of Our Lives"
- European CD single
1. "Turn"
2. "Baby One More Time" (live from the Bay Tavern, Robin Hood's Bay)
- US CD single
1. "Turn" (radio edit)
2. "Why Does It Always Rain on Me?"
3. "Baby One More Time" (live from VH1 Storytellers)
- Japanese CD EP
1. "Turn"
2. "River"
3. "Days of Our Lives"
4. "We Are Monkeys"
5. "Baby One More Time" (live from the Bay Tavern, Robin Hood's Bay)
6. "Writing to Reach You" (video)
7. "Driftwood" (video)
8. "Why Does It Always Rain on Me?" (video)
9. "Turn" (video)

== Credits and personnel ==
Credits are lifted from the UK CD1 liner notes.

Studios

- Produced at Chateau de la Rouge Motte (Domfront en Poiraie, France) and Abbey Road (London, England)
- Mixed at Strongroom Studios (London, England)

Personnel

- Fran Healy – writing
- Mike Hedges – production
- Nigel Godrich – mixing
- Blue Source – art direction
- Stefan Ruiz – photography

== Charts ==
=== Weekly charts ===
| Chart (1999–2000) | Peak position |
|---|---|
| Europe (Eurochart Hot 100) | 38 |
| Ireland (IRMA) | 28 |
| New Zealand (Recorded Music NZ) | 37 |
| Scotland Singles (Official Charts) | 2 |
| Sweden (Sverigetopplistan) | 60 |
| UK Singles (Official Charts) | 8 |

=== Year-end charts ===
| Chart (1999) | Position |
|---|---|
| UK Singles (OCC) | 173 |

== Certifications ==
| Region | Certification | Certified units/sales |
|---|---|---|
| United Kingdom (BPI) | Silver | 200,000^{‡} |
^{‡} Sales+streaming figures based on certification alone.

== Release history ==
| Region | Date | Format(s) | Label(s) | Ref. |
|---|---|---|---|---|
| United Kingdom | 8 November 1999 | CD; cassette | Independiente | |
| Japan | 23 March 2000 | CD | Independiente; Epic | |
| United States | 12 September 2000 | Alternative radio | Independiente; Epic | |
