= The Invisible Band =

Studio album by Travis
- Released: 11 June 2001
- Recorded: 2000–2001
- Studios: Ocean Way, Los Angeles; AIR, London
- Genres: Alternative rock; post-Britpop; indie pop
- Length: 45:27
- Labels: Independiente; Epic
- Producer: Nigel Godrich

Travis chronology
The Man Who (1999)	The Invisible Band (2001)	12 Memories (2003)

Singles from The Invisible Band
- 1. "Sing" Released: 28 May 2001; 2. "Side" Released: 17 September 2001; 3. "Flowers in the Window" Released: 25 March 2002

The Invisible Band is the third studio album by Scottish rock band Travis, produced by Nigel Godrich. It was released on 11 June 2001 in the United Kingdom by Independiente and a day later in the United States by Epic Records. Frontman Fran Healy said the title of the album referred to the band's status of having famous songs, but not being famous themselves. It was supported by the release of its lead single, "Sing", which received critical acclaim from music critics and achieved strong chart positions, including reaching the top ten of the national singles charts in France, Scotland, Norway, Ireland and the United Kingdom. The second single, "Side" was released three months following the album in September, and also achieved strong chart positions and acclaim.

A third and final single, "Flowers in the Window", was released in March 2002. The Invisible Band debuted atop the UK Albums Charts where it spent a total of four weeks. Likewise, it debuted atop the Scottish Albums Charts where it remained for six weeks, before returning to the top spot in October. In the United Kingdom, it sold 1.2 million copies, earning it a 4x Platinum certification from the British Phonographic Industry (BPI). It also achieved commercial success internationally, reaching the top of the national albums charts in both Norway and Ireland, and reaching the top ten in the likes of Austria, Germany, New Zealand, Sweden, Switzerland and Italy, whilst in the United States, it peaked at number thirty-nine on the Billboard 200.

Regarded as one of the "era defining" albums of the 2000s, NME described the album as "self-consciously downbeat and rustic". It was ranked by Q was one of the best albums of the year, and its success lead to the band being awarded the Brit Award for British Group for the second time in their career. The album was also nominated for Brit Award for British Album of the Year in 2002, with No Angel by Dido being the eventual winner of the award.

== Recording ==
The Invisible Band was recorded at Ocean Way Recording, Los Angeles. It was produced by Nigel Godrich, who also produced the previous Travis record, The Man Who (1999). According to the Travis songwriter, Fran Healy, Godrich arrived for the sessions in a bad mood. Healy said Godrich was frustrated after the gruelling recording sessions for Radiohead's albums Kid A and Amnesiac, and so "took it out on us because he couldn't take it out on Radiohead".

Godrich was strict with Travis and rejected their initial work, which they found dispiriting. Eventually, after a serious argument, the mood settled. Healy felt it was good for Godrich to work with "melodic" bands such as Travis as well as more experimental acts such as Radiohead. The group began to make progress after a session experimenting with unusual instruments such as a tanpura.

== Critical reception ==
Professional ratings
Aggregate scores
Source	Rating
Metacritic	71/100
Review scores
Source	Rating
AllMusic	4/5 stars
Entertainment Weekly	A−
The Guardian	3/5 stars
Los Angeles Times	3.5/4 stars
NME	8/10
Pitchfork	6.1/10
Q	4/5 stars
Rolling Stone	3.5/5 stars
Spin	6/10
Uncut	4/5 stars

At Metacritic, which assigns a normalised rating out of 100 to reviews from mainstream critics, The Invisible Band received an average score of 71 based on 17 reviews, which indicates "generally favourable reviews".

Q wrote: "While the wheel remains un-reinvented, The Invisible Band finds its mark with unerring accuracy". While Launch also said of the album, "Songs like the stirring 'Side', the delicate 'Dear Diary', and the glistening 'Follow the Light' are among the best and most fully crafted of Fran Healy's short but accomplished writing career". Q also listed it as one of the best 50 albums of 2001.

== Track listing ==
All tracks are written by Fran Healy.

No.	Title	Length
1.	"Sing"	3:48
2.	"Dear Diary"	2:57
3.	"Side"	3:59
4.	"Pipe Dreams"	4:05
5.	"Flowers in the Window"	3:41
6.	"The Cage"	3:05
7.	"Safe"	4:23
8.	"Follow the Light"	3:08
9.	"Last Train"	3:16
10.	"Afterglow"	4:05
11.	"Indefinitely"	3:52
12.	"The Humpty Dumpty Love Song"	5:02

== Personnel ==
Adapted from the album liner notes.

Travis

- Fran Healy – vocals, guitar, piano
- Dougie Payne – bass guitar
- Andy Dunlop – guitar, banjo
- Neil Primrose – drums, percussion

Additional musicians

- Jason Falkner – keyboards (track 9)
- Millennia Strings – strings (tracks 1, 11 and 12)
- Joby Talbot – string arrangement (tracks 1, 11 and 12)

Additional personnel

- Nigel Godrich – production, mixing
- Bernie Grundman Mastering – mastering
- Darrell Thorp – assistant engineer at Ocean Way Studios
- Jon Bailey – assistant engineer at Air Studios
- Steve Orchard – string engineering (tracks 11 and 12)

== Charts ==
=== Weekly charts ===
Chart (2001)	Peak position
Australian Albums (ARIA)	7
Austrian Albums (Ö3 Austria)	2
Belgian Albums (Ultratop Flanders)	21
Belgian Albums (Ultratop Wallonia)	9
Canadian Albums (Billboard)	12
Danish Albums (Hitlisten)	5
Dutch Albums (Album Top 100)	40
Europe (European Top 100 Albums)	2
Finnish Albums (Suomen virallinen lista)	13
French Albums (SNEP)	13
German Albums (Offizielle Top 100)	3
Irish Albums (IRMA)	1
Italian Albums (FIMI)	8
Norwegian Albums (VG-lista)	1
New Zealand Albums (RMNZ)	5
Spanish Albums (PROMUSICAE)	36
Swedish Albums (Sverigetopplistan)	5
Swiss Albums (Schweizer Hitparade)	6
UK Albums (Official Charts)	1
US Billboard 200	39

=== Year-end charts ===
Chart (2001)	Position
Australian Albums (ARIA)	72
Austrian Albums (Ö3 Austria)	51
Belgian Albums (Ultratop Wallonia)	82
Danish Albums (Hitlisten)	18
Europe (European Top 100 Albums)	19
French Albums (SNEP)	145
German Albums (Offizielle Top 100)	40
Irish Albums (IRMA)	14
New Zealand Albums (RMNZ)	48
Swedish Albums (Sverigetopplistan)	70
Swiss Albums (Schweizer Hitparade)	43
UK Albums (OCC)	7
Worldwide Albums (IFPI)	39

Chart (2002)	Position
Europe (European Top 100 Albums)	99
French Albums (SNEP)	145
UK Albums (OCC)	78

== Certifications ==
Certifications for The Invisible Band
Region	Certification	Certified units/sales
Australia (ARIA)	Gold	35,000^{^}
Canada (Music Canada)	Gold	50,000^{^}
France (SNEP)	Gold	100,000^{*}
Germany (BVMI)	Gold	150,000^{^}
New Zealand (RMNZ)	Gold	7,500^{^}
Norway (IFPI Norway)	Platinum	50,000^{*}
Sweden (GLF)	Gold	40,000^{^}
Switzerland (IFPI Switzerland)	Gold	20,000^{^}
United Kingdom (BPI)	4× Platinum	1,200,000^{^}
Summaries
Europe (IFPI)	2× Platinum	2,000,000^{*}
^{*} Sales figures based on certification alone.^{^} Shipments figures based on certification alone.
