= The Beautiful Occupation =

Single by Travis

from the album 12 Memories
- B-side: "The Score", "I Don't Mean To Get High", "Distraction", "Back in the Day"
- Released: 15 December 2003
- Recorded: Late 2001
- Genre: Indie rock
- Length: 3:47
- Label: Independiente
- Songwriter: Fran Healy
- Producers: Steve Orchard, Travis, Tchad Blake

Travis singles chronology
"Re-Offender" (2003)	"The Beautiful Occupation" (2003)	"Love Will Come Through" (2004)

"The Beautiful Occupation" is the second single from Scottish alternative rock band Travis' fourth studio album, 12 Memories. The single was released in the UK on 15 December 2003 and peaked at #48 on the UK singles chart. An acoustic version of "The Beautiful Occupation" is included on the 2003 compilation album Hope released by the War Child charity.

== Theme ==
The Beautiful Occupation was written by singer Fran Healy as a protest in response to the 2003 invasion of Iraq. The band played the song live at the 2003 MTV Europe Music Awards and were joined onstage by naked protestors carrying anti-war placards towards the end of the performance. In a 2021 interview with the NME, Healy revealed that Radiohead guitarist Ed O'Brien praised Travis for their anti-war position: 'I remember in 2005, Radiohead's Ed [O’Brien, guitarist] taking me aside and going, 'I want to say thanks because you were the only band saying anything', which meant a lot from the band who did ‘Hail to the Thief’”.

== Track listing ==
- UK CD1
1. "The Beautiful Occupation" - 3:47
2. "The Score" - 4:19
3. "I Don't Mean To Get High" - 2:58
- UK CD2
1. "The Beautiful Occupation" - 3:47
2. "Distraction" - 4:11
3. "Back in the Day" - 3:23
- 7" Vinyl
1. "The Beautiful Occupation" - 3:47
2. "I Don't Mean To Get High" - 2:58
- Minidisc
1. "The Beautiful Occupation" - 3:47
2. "Enemy" - 3:22

== Charts ==
Chart (2003–04)	Peak position
Scottish Singles Sales (Official Charts)	38
Germany (GfK)	97
UK Singles (Official Charts)	48
