= Re-Offender =

2003 single by Travis

Single by Travis

from the album 12 Memories
- B-side: "Definition of Wrong", "Enemy", "The Sea", "Don't Be Shy"
- Released: 29 September 2003
- Length: 3:48
- Label: Independiente
- Songwriter: Fran Healy
- Producers: Travis, Tchad Blake, Steve Orchard

Travis singles chronology
| "Flowers in the Window" (2002) | "Re-Offender" (2003) | "The Beautiful Occupation" (2003) |

"Re-Offender" is a song by Scottish alternative rock band Travis, released as the first single from their fourth studio album, 12 Memories. It was released as a single in the UK on 29 September 2003 and peaked at number seven on the UK Singles Chart. The song featured in two episodes of One Tree Hill and is included in the compilation album One Tree Hill – Music from the WB Television Series, Vol. 1.

== Background ==
Re-Offender is about singer Fran Healy's dad's abusive behaviour towards to his mum. In a 2020 interview with Jaxsta, Healy revealed he had asked his mum why she stayed in the relationship for so long: 'She just always said the same thing: ‘He said, “I’m so sorry, I’ll never do it again.”’ And then he did it again.'

The song reflects the darker themes of 12 Memories compared to the band's previous releases. In August 2003 Healy told NME: “I’ve always written about love and now that I’ve found that I’ve unblocked that particular thing. I’m writing about different things now. I had to change the subject matter. I’ve changed the whole way I approach songwriting".

== Music video ==
The music video depicts the band playing small venues in and around Glasgow. In the beginning the band are travelling in the same car but after several fall-outs and physical fights by the end the band are each travelling in separate vehicles. The video was directed by Anton Corbijn.

== Track listing ==
- UK CD1
1. "Re-Offender" – 3:47
2. "Definition of Wrong" – 2:44
3. "Enemy" – 3:22
- UK CD2
1. "Re-Offender" – 3:47
2. "The Sea" – 4:18
3. "Don't Be Shy" – 4:46
- 7" vinyl
1. "Re-Offender" – 3:47
2. "Definition of Wrong" – 2:44

== Charts ==
Chart performance for "Re-Offender"
| Chart (2003) | Peak position |
|---|---|
| Australia (ARIA) | 85 |
| Ireland (IRMA) | 45 |
| Netherlands (Single Top 100) | 87 |
| Norway (VG-lista) | 12 |
| Scottish Singles Sales (Official Charts) | 7 |
| Switzerland (Schweizer Hitparade) | 84 |
| UK Singles (Official Charts) | 7 |
