= All I Want to Do Is Rock =

Single by Travis

from the album Good Feeling
- Written: June 1995
- Released: 10 October 1996
- Recorded: 1995
- Genre: Britpop
- Length: 3:53
- Label: Red Telephone Box (original release); Independiente (re-release)
- Songwriter: Fran Healy

Travis singles chronology
| "All I Want to Do Is Rock" (1996) | "U16 Girls" (1997) |

"All I Want to Do Is Rock" is the debut single by the Scottish rock band Travis. Originally released as a 10" vinyl on the Red Telephone Box label in 1996, it was fully re-released by Independiente Records a year later on 6 June 1997, after the band signed with the label to record their debut album Good Feeling (1997). The band frequently refers to the track as their "theme song" or their "national anthem", and as of 2009, have added the song back onto their live set lists. The song later appeared as a snippet on Hellboy II: The Golden Army.

Travis frontman Fran Healy wrote the song in 1995 while in Millport, Scotland. At the same time, Healy also wrote "Turn", which would later be recorded for the band's following album, The Man Who.

== Track listing ==
- 1996 10" vinyl
1. "All I Want to Do Is Rock" (Demo) – 4:04
2. "The Line Is Fine" (Demo) – 3:42
3. "Funny Thing" (Demo) – 5:03
- UK CD1
1. "All I Want to Do Is Rock" – 3:53
2. "Blue on a Black Weekend" – 3:19
3. "Combing My Hair" – 4:03
- UK CD2
1. "All I Want to Do Is Rock" – 3:53
2. "20" – 4:06
3. "1922" – 3:50
- 7" vinyl / cassette / European single
1. "All I Want to Do Is Rock" – 3:53
2. "Blue on a Black Weekend" – 3:19
- American E.P.
1. "All I Want to Do Is Rock" – 3:53
2. "Hazy Shades of Gold" – 3:18
3. "1922" – 3:50
4. "U16 Girls" (featuring The Joyous Lake Singers) – 4:00
5. "Blue on a Black Weekend" – 3:19
6. "20" – 4:06

== Music video ==
In the music video directed by Jamie Thraves, the band performs the song in the middle of a road, stopping a woman who isn't able to drive around them. Soon, traffic builds up and people emerge from their vehicles to hear the band. Eventually, the woman is fed up with the whole ordeal and drives away. According to frontman Fran Healy, the video was shot "in some deserted US army accommodation estate somewhere outside London".
