= Happy (Travis song) =

Single by Travis

from the album Good Feeling
- Released: 13 October 1997
- Recorded: 1996–1997
- Genre: Britpop
- Length: 4:15
- Label: Independiente
- Songwriter(s): Fran Healy
- Producer(s): Steve Lillywhite

Travis singles chronology
"Tied to the 90's" (1997)	"Happy" (1997)	"More Than Us" (1998)

"Happy" is the fourth single to be taken from Indie band Travis' debut album, Good Feeling. Since the release of the single, until the end of 2007, "Happy" was typically used as the encore song during their live concerts. The single reached number 38 on the UK singles chart.

== Track listing ==
- UK CD1
1. "Happy" - 4:16
2. "Unbelievers" - 3:49
3. "Everyday Faces" - 3:48
- UK CD2 / 7" Vinyl / Cassette
1. "Happy" - 4:16
2. "When I'm Feeling Blue (Days of the Week)" - 3:25
3. "Mother" - 2:28
