= Good Feeling (Travis album) =

Studio album by Travis
- Released: 8 September 1997
- Recorded: 1995–1997
- Studio: Bearsville Studios, Woodstock, New York
- Genre: Britpop, indie rock, baroque pop
- Length: 48:59
- Label: Independiente
- Producer: Steve Lillywhite

Travis chronology
Good Feeling (1997)	The Man Who (1999)

Singles from Good Feeling
- 1. "All I Want to Do Is Rock" Released: 10 October 1996; 2. "U16 Girls" Released: 1 April 1997; 3. "Tied to the 90's" Released: 11 August 1997; 4. "Happy" Released: 13 October 1997; 5. "More Than Us" Released: 30 March 1998

Good Feeling is the debut studio album by the Scottish rock band Travis. The album was released on 8 September 1997, on Independiente Records. All four singles released from the album reached the UK Top 40 (with Tied To The 90s making to Top 30).

== Background and release ==
Once set up in London, the band spent between nine months and a year recording new songs. The band played their first London show at the Dublin Castle pub in Camden. With around twenty good songs ready, they then approached managers Colin Lester and Ian McAndrew of Wildlife Entertainment, who then introduced the band to Andy MacDonald, owner of Go! Discs Records and founder of Independiente Records. The band was signed to MacDonald personally, not to the label—if MacDonald ever leaves the Sony-financed label Independiente Records, the band goes with him (commonly referred to in the industry as a "golden handcuffs" clause).

The album itself has a much more upbeat and 'rockier' sound than their subsequent releases and is often regarded as one of their best. In 2000 the album was re-released, with the only differences being new album artwork (featuring a headshot of the band on a black background) and a slightly-tweaked version of "More Than Us". In April 2021, Craft Recordings re-issued the album on vinyl with the original cover (featuring a full band shot with a mostly white background).

== Production ==
Produced by Steve Lillywhite of U2 fame, Travis' first studio album, 1997's Good Feeling, is a rockier, more upbeat record than the band's others to date. Recorded at the legendary Bearsville Studios in Woodstock, New York, the place where Travis favourite the Band recorded, the album contained singles such as "All I Want to Do Is Rock", "U16 Girls", the Beatle'esque "Tied to the 90's", "Happy" and "More Than Us". Guest musicians include Page McConnell of Phish playing keyboards on the title track "Good Feeling". The album reached No. 9 on the British charts, but with little radio play, it slipped from the charts relatively quickly, dropping to number 26 and then 53 over the next couple of weeks (though over the next few years it would end up with 27 weeks inside the Top 100, making it the third longest chart run for a Travis album). Although it heralded Travis' arrival on the British music scene, received extremely positive reviews, and substantially broadened Travis' fan base, it sold just 40,000 copies. Following the release, Travis toured extensively, their live performances further enhancing their reputation. This included support slots in the UK for Oasis, after Noel Gallagher became an outspoken fan.

== Critical reception ==
Professional ratings
Review scores
Source	Rating
AllMusic	4/5 stars
Entertainment Weekly	B+
The Guardian	4/5 stars
The Independent	(Positive)
NME	8/10
The Observer	(Positive)
Pitchfork Media	6.2/10
Uncut	4/5 stars

The New York Times concluded that the album "is flawed, sprinkled with a few songs that are worse than bad—they're boring and trite... But if future albums live up to the promise of this one's best moments, Travis could be Britain's next revered rock standard-bearer."

== Track listing ==
All tracks written by Fran Healy.

No.	Title	Length
1.	"All I Want to Do Is Rock"	3:52
2.	"U16 Girls"	4:00
3.	"The Line Is Fine"	4:04
4.	"Good Day to Die"	3:17
5.	"Good Feeling"	3:24
6.	"Midsummer Nights Dreamin'"	3:54
7.	"Tied to the 90's"	3:08
8.	"I Love You Anyways"	5:30
9.	"Happy"	4:15
10.	"More Than Us"	3:56
11.	"Falling Down"	4:17
12.	"Funny Thing"	5:22
Total length:		49:05

== Personnel ==
- Fran Healy – lead vocals, guitar
- Dougie Payne – bass guitar, backing vocals
- Andy Dunlop – guitar, backing vocals, piano
- Neil Primrose – drums, percussion
- Page McConnell – keyboards (track 5)

== Certifications ==
Region	Certification	Certified units/sales
United Kingdom (BPI)	Platinum	300,000^{‡}
^{‡} Sales+streaming figures based on certification alone.
