= Coming Around (Travis song) =

2000 single by Travis

Single by Travis
- B-side: "Just the Faces Change"; "The Connection"; "Rock 'N' (Salad) Roll"; "The Weight"
- Released: 5 June 2000
- Length: 3:10
- Label: Independiente
- Songwriter: Fran Healy
- Producers: Mark Wallis; Travis

Travis singles chronology
"Turn" (1999)	"Coming Around" (2000)	"Sing" (2001)

Music video
- "Coming Around" on YouTube

"Coming Around" is a song by Scottish indie rock band Travis, released on 5 June 2000 as a stand-alone single, although it was subsequently added to a limited-edition version of The Man Who. Written by frontman Fran Healy and produced by Mark Wallis along with the band, it was recorded at both Roundhouse Studios and Eden Studios in London, England. In 2012, American rock band Counting Crows recorded this song for their album Underwater Sunshine (or What We Did on Our Summer Vacation).

"Coming Around" became Travis's first single to debut atop the Scottish Singles Charts, whilst in the United Kingdom, it debuted at number five on the UK Singles Charts. It also charted in Ireland, where it reached number 18 on the Irish Singles Charts. A music video for "Coming Around" was filmed in Los Angeles by director Ringan Ledwidge, and was based largely on Humpty Dumpty, with Healy claiming the idea for the video was to bring the character of Humpty Dumpty "into the modern context" after Healy's curiosity as to how the character would fare in the modern world.

== Track listings ==
- UK CD1
1. "Coming Around"
2. "Just the Faces Change"
3. "The Connection"
- UK CD2
1. "Coming Around"
2. "Rock 'N' (Salad) Roll"
3. "The Weight"
- UK 7-inch and cassette single
1. "Coming Around"
2. "The Connection"
- Japanese EP
1. "Coming Around"
2. "Just the Faces Change"
3. "The Connection"
4. "Rock 'N' (Salad) Roll"
5. "The Weight"

== Credits and personnel ==
Credits are taken from the UK CD1 liner notes.

Studios

- Produced at Roundhouse Studios and Eden Studios (London, England)
- Mixed at The Strongroom (London, England)

Personnel

- Fran Healy – writing
- Mark Wallis – production
- Travis – production
- Nigel Godrich – mixing
- Blue Source – art direction
- Bridget Smith – photography

== Charts ==
=== Weekly charts ===
Chart (2000)	Peak position
Europe (Eurochart Hot 100)	28
Ireland (IRMA)	18
Scottish Singles Sales (Official Charts)	1
UK Singles (Official Charts)	5

=== Year-end charts ===
Chart (2000)	Position
UK Singles (OCC)	191

== Release history ==
Region	Date	Format(s)	Label(s)	Ref.
United Kingdom	5 June 2000	CD; cassette	Independiente	
United Kingdom	12 June 2000	7-inch vinyl	Independiente	
Japan	27 September 2000	CD	Independiente; Epic	
