= Writing to Reach You =

1999 single by Travis

Single by Travis

from the album The Man Who
- B-side: "Yeah Yeah Yeah Yeah"; "High as a Kite"; "Green Behind the Ears"; "Only Molly Knows"
- Released: 8 March 1999
- Recorded: September 1998
- Studio: RAK (London, England)
- Genre: Post-Britpop
- Length: 3:41
- Label: Independiente
- Songwriter: Fran Healy
- Producer: Nigel Godrich

Travis singles chronology
"More Than Us" (1998)	"Writing to Reach You" (1999)	"Driftwood" (1999)

"Writing to Reach You" is the first single taken from Scottish rock band Travis's second studio album, The Man Who (1999).

== Background ==
The song was written by Fran Healy, who admitted that he had written this song while listening to "'74–'75" on the radio and took the guitar chords from Oasis's "Wonderwall" and "D'You Know What I Mean?"; as an overt acknowledgement of this, the song contains the lyric "and what's a wonderwall, anyway?".

In 2004, both "Writing to Reach You" and "Wonderwall" were mixed with Green Day's "Boulevard of Broken Dreams" in the popular mashup "Boulevard of Broken Songs".

The single was the band's first release in Japan and Australia, following their success in the United Kingdom. The song also earned Travis their first appearance on Top of the Pops. The single peaked at number 14 on the UK singles chart. Fran was reading Letters to Felice from Franz Kafka while he wrote this song.

== Music video ==
The video was directed by John Hardwick. It features Healy walking in the countryside and being attacked by a pair of schoolchildren. They pelt him with stones and shoot him with arrows, only to find that he is wearing body armour, which he takes off with the arrows still embedded. He is also attacked by a Bf 109 fighter plane being flown by one of the children. The video ends with Healy giving a letter of some sort to the school girl who shot him with arrows earlier and she runs toward the camera as it travels further away from the set.

== Track listings ==
- UK CD single 1 and digital download 1
1. "Writing to Reach You" — 3:44
2. "Green Behind the Ears" — 3:40
3. "Only Molly Knows" — 3:21
- UK CD single 2 and digital download 2
1. "Writing to Reach You" — 3:42
2. "Yeah Yeah Yeah Yeah" — 3:49
3. "High as a Kite" — 2:30
- UK cassette and 7-inch single
1. " Writing to Reach You" — 3:41
2. "Only Molly Knows" — 3:20
- Australian CD single
1. "Writing to Reach You" — 3:42
2. "Green Behind the Ears" — 3:40
3. "Only Molly Knows" — 3:19
4. "Yeah Yeah Yeah Yeah" — 3:49
5. "High as a Kite" — 2:30
- Japanese CD single
1. "Writing to Reach You" — 3:42
2. "Yeah Yeah Yeah Yeah" — 3:49
3. "High as a Kite" — 2:30
4. "Green Behind the Ears" — 3:40
5. "Only Molly Knows" — 3:19

== Appearances in popular culture ==
The song's intro is used as bumper music on the Ring of Fire radio program.

== Charts ==
Chart (1999)	Peak position
Scotland Singles (OCC)	7
UK Singles (OCC)	14
