= Mike Hedges =

British record producer

- Born: 1954 (age 71–72); Nottingham, England
- Occupations: Producer; audio engineer
- Years active: 1969—present

Mike Hedges (born 1954) is a British audio producer/engineer best known for his work with the Cure, Siouxsie and the Banshees, and Manic Street Preachers. During his career, Hedges has worked with an eclectic roster of artists ranging from rock and pop acts such as U2, Dido, Travis, Texas, the Beautiful South, and Everything but the Girl, to cult-indie band the Cooper Temple Clause and classically oriented projects, the Priests and Sarah Brightman. His creative input and influence dramatically impacted the trajectories of bands such as the Cure, the Associates, Manic Street Preachers, and Travis.

== Early life ==
Hedges was born in Nottingham, England in 1954 and grew up in Northern Rhodesia (now Zambia), where he attended a Jesuit school. He comes from a Catholic family.

== Career ==
Hedges returned to the UK in 1969 and was working in Haywards Heath as a squash coach when he was offered a job as a tape op at London's Morgan Studios. His first engineer credit came in the form of Heatwave's Central Heating. In 1981, he left Morgan Studios to become a freelancer and start Playground Studios in Camden Town, then moved on to work at Abbey Road Studios for ten years. Siouxsie and the Banshees, the Associates, and Wah! were among some of his earliest clients. Hedges lived in the Willesden area of London near Morgan Studios.

In 1990, he purchased Chateau de la Rouge Motte, a home in Domfront en Poiraie in the Normandy countryside, and retired for less than a month in 1992. He renovated the chateau to act as a new studio and outfitted it with a 16 channel EMI TG12345 Mark IV mixing desk, which he bought directly from Abbey Road Studios in 1983. The desk was originally installed in Abbey Road Studios, and had been used to record The Dark Side of the Moon by Pink Floyd and John Lennon's single "Imagine". Among the albums recorded there were Lush's Split, Manic Street Preachers' Everything Must Go (BRIT Award recipient) and This Is My Truth Tell Me Yours, and Travis' The Man Who (partially). James Dean Bradfield of the Manic Street Preachers recalled that Hedges greeted them with a hand covered in Normandy brandy and lit on fire, which is how Hedges claimed to welcome every new band.

There were four floors in the chateau: Hedges and his family lived on the top floor; the ten bedrooms on the first floor are for visiting musicians; and the ground floor and basement are control rooms and recording studios. Hedges moved the Mark IV desk back to London in the early 2000s, where it resided in the front room of a studio, and in 2017 was auctioned off for £1.4 million.

Hedges has also worked as part of the musical team for a number of films including Harry Potter and the Goblet of Fire and The Doom Generation.

In 2009, he was working in an A&R role at Sony BMG, where he signed the Priests. He also discovered Friar Alessandro in Italy in 2012.

== Personal life ==
He has four children.

== Selected discography ==
Year	Title	Artist	Label	References
1983	The Sin of Pride	The Undertones	EMI Records	
1988	Peepshow	Siouxsie and the Banshees	Wonderland	
1989	Welcome to the Beautiful South	The Beautiful South	Go! Discs	
1996	Everything Must Go	Manic Street Preachers	Epic Records	
1997	White on Blonde	Texas	Mercury Records	
1999	The Man Who	Travis	Independiente	
2000	All That You Can't Leave Behind	U2	Universal Music Group	
2001	Listen and Learn	Screaming Orphans	Warner Music Group	
2003	Life for Rent	Dido	Cheeky Records	
