= Dougie Payne =

Scottish bassist (born 1972)

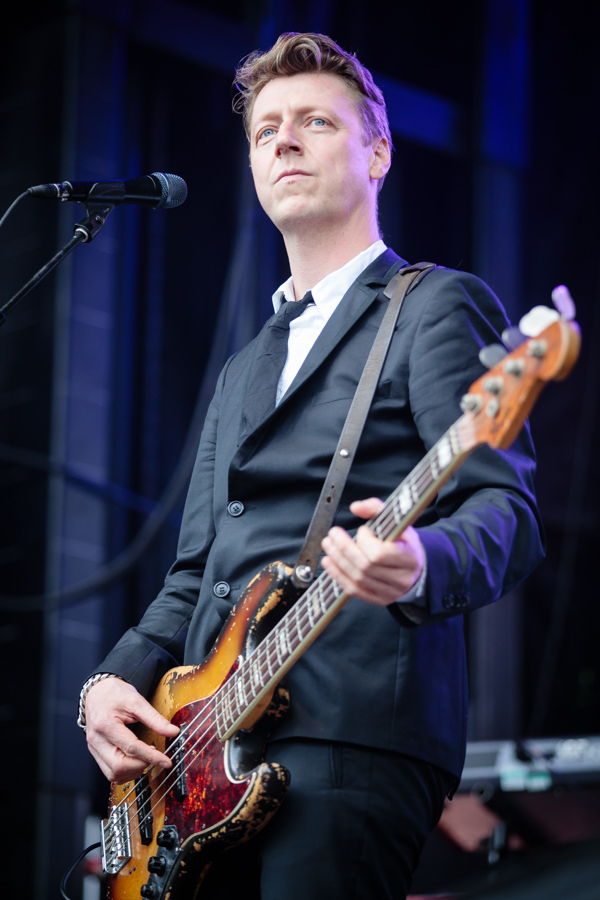
- Payne performing in 2018

Background information
- Born: Douglas Payne; 14 November 1972 (age 53)
- Origin: Thornliebank, Renfrewshire, Scotland
- Genres: Rock, pop
- Occupations: Musician
- Instruments: Bass guitar, vocals
- Years active: 1994–present
- Member of: Travis
- Spouse: Kelly Macdonald (m. 2003; sep. 2017)

Douglas Payne (born 14 November 1972) is a Scottish musician who is the bassist and backing vocalist of the rock band Travis.

== Career ==
Payne was born in the south side of Glasgow and was educated at Woodfarm High School. He was also a member of the local 28th Glasgow (Giffnock) Scout Group in his youth. He went on to become a student at the Glasgow School of Art. In 1994 his friend Fran Healy asked him to join Travis, who was called Glass Onion at the time. Payne had never touched a bass guitar in his life; for weeks he refused to do it, until finally he agreed.

Although he is better known for his bass guitar playing and backing vocals, Payne has written songs of his own. Tracks such as "The Score," "Know Nothing," and "Good for Nothing" were all penned by Payne and have featured as b-sides on the band's more recent singles. Payne also sings lead vocals on some b-sides, for example, "A Little Bit of Soul," from the reverse of "Flowers in the Window", and on "The Distance" from Singles. He wrote the song "Colder," which features on The Boy with No Name and three of the songs from the sixth album, Ode to J. Smith, including the single Something Anything, which is the first Travis single not to be written by Fran Healy. Payne also appeared as a backing vocalist in the song "Tumble and Fall" on Feeder's album Pushing the Senses.

== Personal life ==
Payne married actress Kelly Macdonald in 2003. In November 2007, an announcement on the Travisonline message board said that Payne was to become a father for the first time, making him the last member of Travis to do so. Freddie Peter Payne, his son with Macdonald, was born on 9 March 2008. Their second son, Theodore William Payne, was born on 8 December 2012. Payne and Macdonald announced their separation in 2017. Payne enjoys football and is a supporter of Rangers F.C.

== Equipment ==
- 1970s Fender Jazz Bass Natural Sunburst
- 1970s Fender Jazz Bass Natural White
- 1970s Fender Jazz Bass Natural Black
- 1956 Fender Precision Bass Sunburst
