= Fran Healy (musician) =

Scottish musician

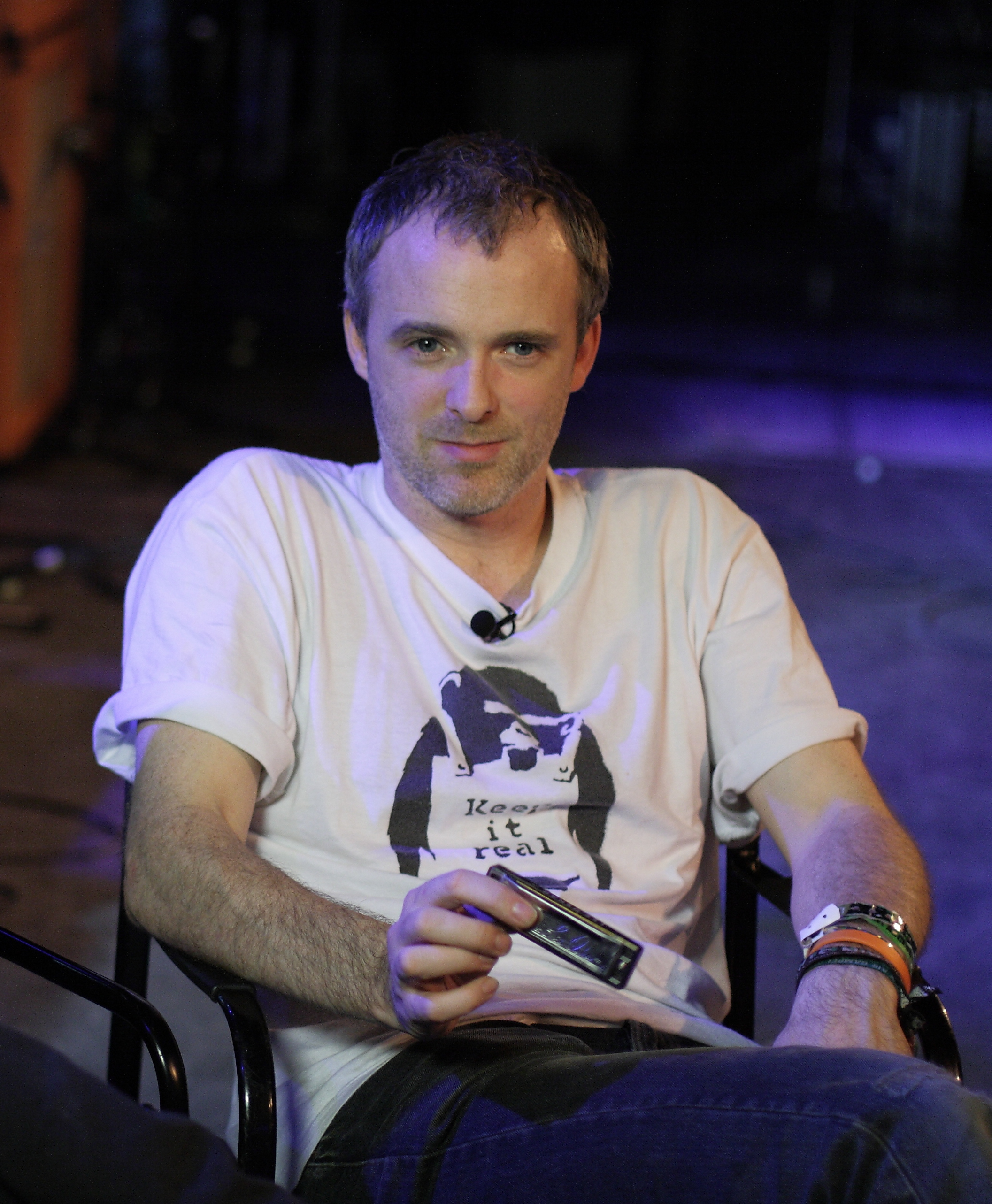
- Healy in Madrid, Spain, October 2007

Background information
- Also known as: Fran
- Born: Francis Healy; 23 July 1973 (age 53); Stafford, England
- Origin: Glasgow, Scotland
- Genres: Rock
- Occupations: Singer, songwriter, musician
- Instruments: Vocals, guitar, piano, keyboards, banjo
- Years active: 1990–present
- Member of: Travis
- Website: https://www.travisonline.com

Francis Healy (born 23 July 1973) is a Scottish musician. He is the lead singer and lyricist of the band Travis, having written nearly all of the songs on their first six studio albums along with their ninth and tenth, with the seventh and eighth containing material written by other members of the band. Healy released his debut solo album, titled Wreckorder, in October 2010.

== Early life ==
Born in Stafford, England, Healy grew up in Glasgow, Scotland, his mother's home town. His mother had moved back to Scotland after divorcing her husband. Healy has said that both his mother and his grandmother were major influences on him. Healy attended Holyrood Secondary School in Glasgow.

During his childhood, Healy achieved a Black Belt ranking in Shotokan Karate.

As a young child at primary school, he was awarded a book of Robert Burns poems and a certificate "For Outstanding Singing Abilities" after singing the Scottish song "Westering Home" while dressed in a kilt. However, Healy showed no further interest in singing until his teens. His obsession with songwriting began to take shape when he got his first guitar in 1986 at the age of 13, having seen Roy Orbison perform his hit "Pretty Woman" on The Last Resort with Jonathan Ross. First songs played on the guitar were old rock'n'roll numbers like "Johnny B. Goode" and "Three Steps to Heaven" by Eddie Cochran.

== Career ==
=== Travis (1990–present) ===
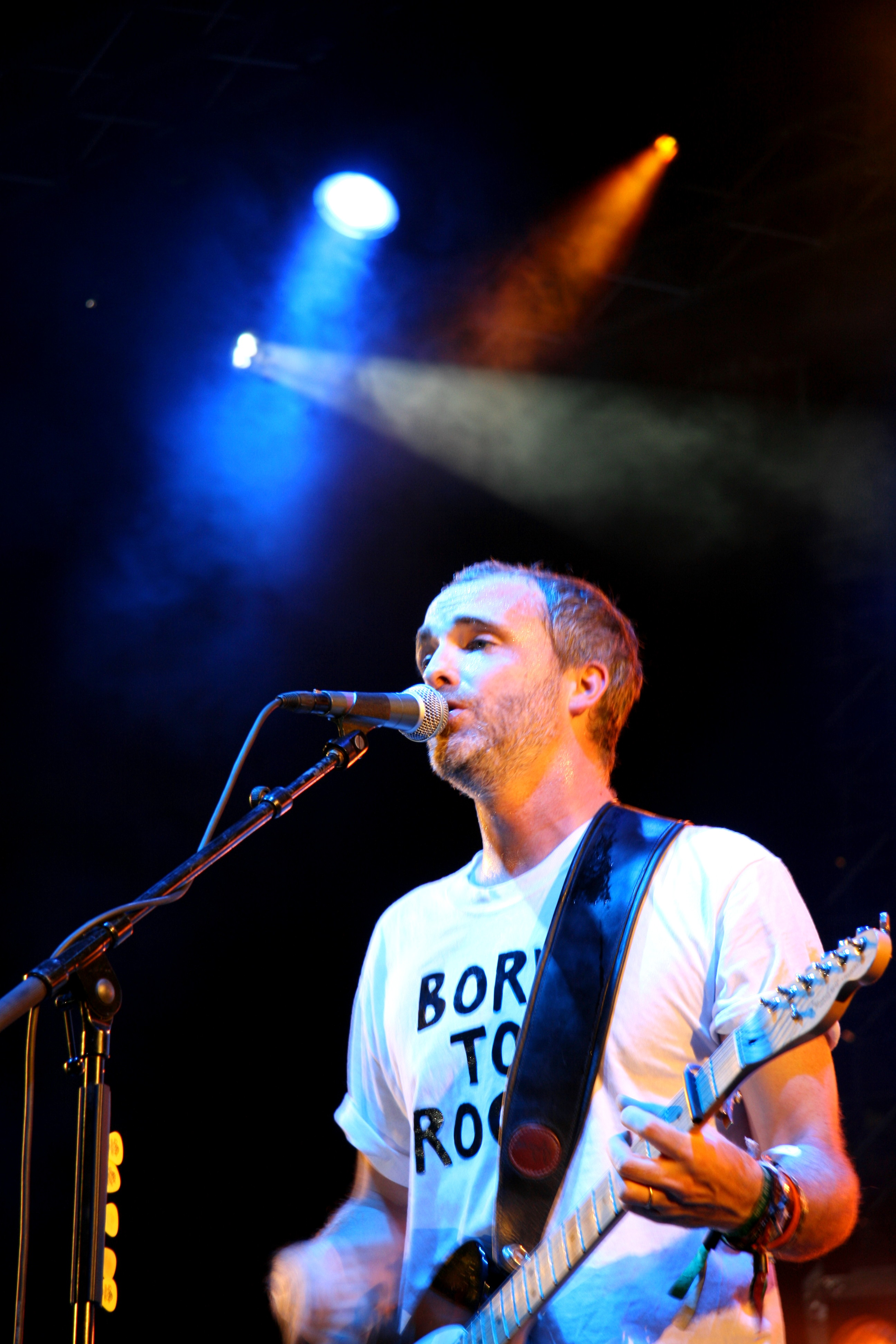
Healy performing with Travis in 2007

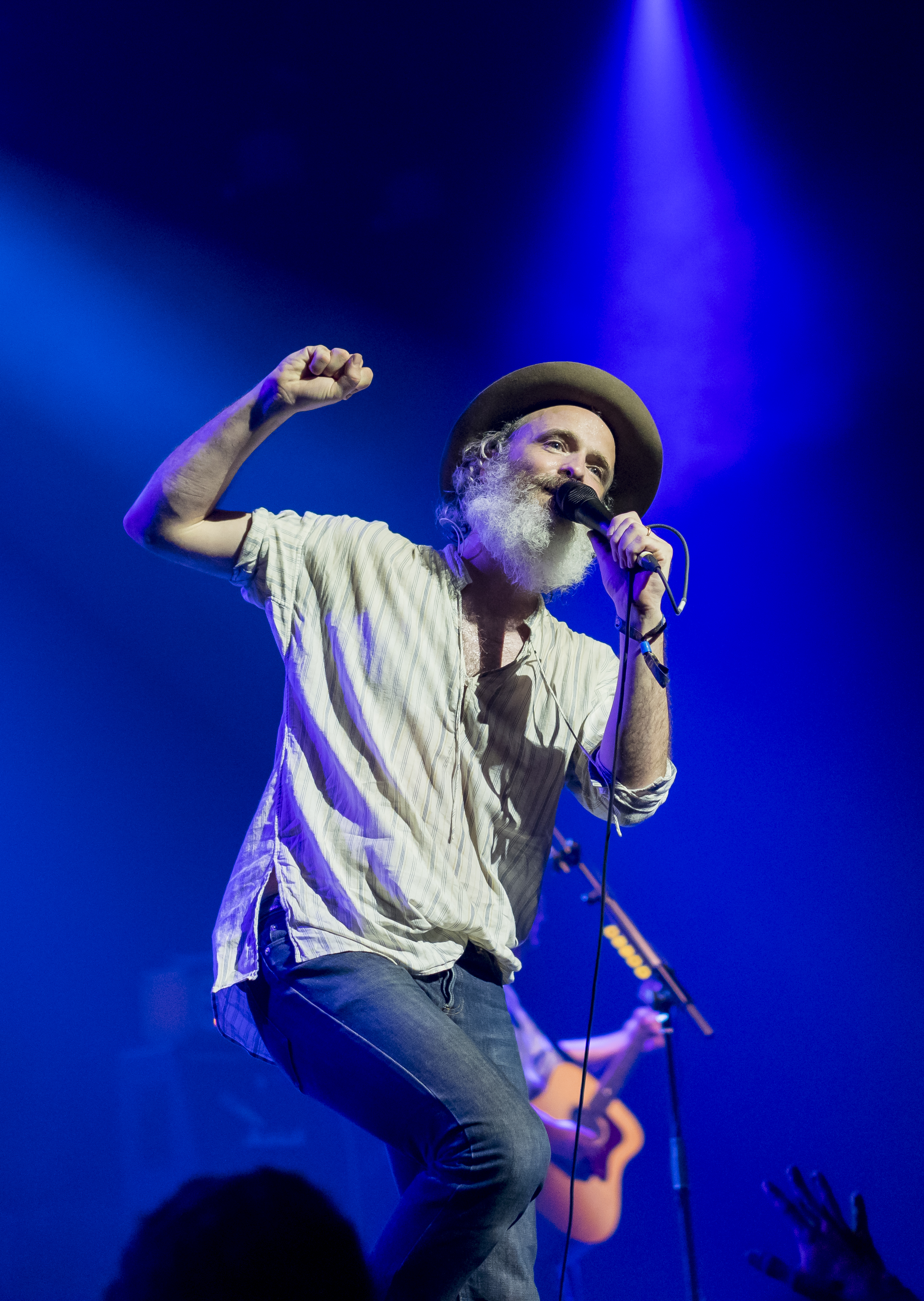
Healy in 2014

In 1991, Neil Primrose, the drummer of Glasgow band Glass Onion, asked Healy if he would like to audition for the band; their previous singer, Catherine Maxwell, had just left the band. Healy joined the band on the same day he enrolled at the Glasgow School of Art. This band soon changed their name to Travis, named after the main character in the Wim Wenders film Paris, Texas.

Travis' first single, "All I Want to Do Is Rock", was written by Healy while on a visit to Millport on Great Cumbrae, a small island in the Firth of Clyde. Going there with the sole intention of composing the best song he had written, Healy surprised himself when the track was created. In spite of Healy's success as a songwriter since, he is without formal musical training. As the band has risen to prominence, Healy has continued to be Travis' main songwriter, as well as the band's main spokesman and most recognisable member.

Travis has twice been awarded British album of the year at the annual BRIT Awards, and is credited as having paved the way for post-Britpop British bands such as Coldplay and Keane. Travis have released nine studio albums, beginning with Good Feeling in 1997.

=== Solo work (2000; 2010) ===
Although Healy predominantly plays guitar, he has also been known to write and perform with piano. In 2000, he appeared on The Clint Boon Experience single "Do What You Do (Earworm Song)", reaching number 63 in the UK charts. Boon described this song as his "masterpiece".

In 2010 Healy released the solo album Wreckorder, which featured Paul McCartney on bass and Neko Case. He co-wrote the song "Here With Me" from The Killers' 2012 album Battle Born.

=== BNQT (2015–2017) ===
In 2015 Healy was invited to join Banquet, a supergroup initiated by Eric Pulido of Midlake as "a poor man's Traveling Wilburys" consisting of musicians that he admired. Besides Healy and Pulido, the band also included Alex Kapranos of Franz Ferdinand, Ben Bridwell from Band of Horses and Grandaddy's Jason Lytle, along with Pulido's Midlake bandmates Jesse Chandler, Joey McClellan and McKenzie Smith. Among the non-Midlake members, Healy was one of only two – along with Lytle – who traveled to Denton, Texas for recording sessions, with the rest contributing remotely. After changing the spelling of the band's name to avoid confusion with another group, BNQT released their debut album Volume 1 on April 28, 2017, to which Healy and the other vocalists each contributed two songs.

=== Influences ===
In interviews, Healy has talked of being influenced by songwriters such as Joni Mitchell, Paul McCartney and Graham Nash (of The Hollies and Crosby, Stills, Nash and Young fame). Healy has since played with both McCartney and Nash.

== Activism ==
Healy is a part of the movement Make Poverty History and has, alongside his band, played at the Live 8 concerts in both London and Edinburgh. He participated in Band Aid 20's re-recording of "Do They Know It's Christmas?", with Healy and friend Nigel Godrich also playing roles in its organisation.

He has so far made two trips to Sudan with the Save the Children organisation. There, he launched the biggest ever global campaign that has raised over 1 billion dollars annually.

Healy has also taken part in and been a speaker at several anti-war demonstrations against the Iraq War.

== Personal life ==
As of 2024, Healy resides in Los Angeles, having moved there in 2017 with his wife Nora Kryst and son. They had previously lived in Berlin to be closer to Kryst's mother and raise Clay.

Healy proposed to German photographer and make-up artist Kryst in October 2000 at Hoover Dam while on tour with Travis. Their son was born on March 10, 2006. Healy and Kryst married in 2008, and relocated to Berlin as they felt it was a better environment in which to raise their child compared to London.

Healy and Kryst split up in 2019, but it was not made public until 2024 when Healy was promoting Travis' then-new tenth album L.A. Times. Healy's bandmates were also initially unaware of the break-up, even though several songs addressed it on their previous album 10 Songs. The song "Live It All Again", which was originally written for 10 Songs but was not released until it was included on L.A. Times, also refers to Healy and Kryst's separation. Four years since splitting up, Healy and Kryst were yet to divorce.

In January 2008, it was announced that Healy would curate a new talent compilation for Paul McCartney's Liverpool Institute for Performing Arts.

In 2010, as a way to thank Paul McCartney for playing on his solo album, Healy and his wife became vegetarian. McCartney is a long-time advocate of vegetarianism.

Healy was a member of the Glasgow athletics club Bellahouston Harriers in his youth, and took part in the Berlin Relay Marathon in 2012.

At the 2005 general election, Healy was reported to be a supporter of the Liberal Democrats. In a 2013 interview, speaking of an earlier interview in which he appeared to criticise Alex Salmond, he said "I certainly came across as pro-Labour but the truth is I'm not pro-anyone."

During a 2024 interview, Healy credited his mother for teaching him persistence while also stating that his father was "dead" and had remained absent throughout his life.

== Discography ==
Studio albums

- Wreckorder (2010)

Featured singles

- "Do They Know It's Christmas?" (2004) – as part of Band Aid 20
