= Independiente (record label) =

Independiente Records
- Parent company: Concord
- Founded: 1997
- Founder: Andy Macdonald
- Distributors: Universal Music Group (worldwide distribution); Craft Recordings (reissues)
- Genre: Various
- Country of origin: UK
- Location: London, England
- Official website: www.independiente.co.uk

Independiente is a British independent record label formed in 1997 after Andy Macdonald sold his first label Go! Discs to PolyGram in 1996 for a reported £30 million. The label, which is currently dormant, is a division of Concord Music.

The label's catalogue included albums by Travis, John Martyn, Nile, Gomez, Embrace, Paul Weller and Martina Topley-Bird. In December 2013, it was confirmed that Embrace had signed to Cooking Vinyl, leaving Independiente with no current artists on its roster. The label ceased releasing music by new artists in 2009 and has subsequently transformed itself into a profitable synchronisation business, sourcing opportunities in film and advertising for its catalogue.

== Label success ==
The label saw a considerable amount of success in the late 1990s and early 2000s with the Travis album The Man Who being cited as the 25th biggest selling album in the UK, and their follow up The Invisible Band in 2001, along with Out of Nothing, Embrace's UK number one comeback album released in September 2004. Embrace's follow-up album This New Day also debuted at number one, becoming the band's third number one album.

== Artists who have released records on Independiente ==
- Archive
- Blackbud
- Crashland
- Deejay Punk-Roc
- Embrace
- David Ford
- Roddy Frame
- Gomez
- Howling Bells
- Kinesis
- Lisa Maffia
- John Martyn
- Ooberman
- Nile
- Ulrich Schnauss
- The Shortwave Set
- Snowblind
- So Solid Crew
- Sun House
- The Tears
- Martina Topley-Bird
- Tinariwen
- Travis
- Paul Weller
- White Rose Movement
- Vitro

== See also ==
- List of record labels
