= The View discography =

- Studio albums: 6
- EPs: 3
- Compilation albums: 1
- Singles: 17

The discography of Scottish rock band The View consists of six studio albums, three EPs, one compilation album and seventeen singles.

== Albums ==
=== Studio albums ===
Title	Album details	Peak chart positions								Certifications
Title	Album details	UK	UK Indie	AUS Hit.	GER	IRE	JPN	NED Alt.	SCO	Certifications
Hats Off to the Buskers	Released: 22 January 2007; Label: 1965; Formats: CD, digital download	1	—	6	89	3	—	—	1	BPI: Platinum; IRMA: Gold
Which Bitch?	Released: 2 February 2009; Label: 1965; Formats: CD, digital download	4	—	—	—	33	29	14	1	BPI: Silver
Bread and Circuses	Released: 14 March 2011; Label: 1965; Formats: CD, digital download	14	—	12	—	88	—	—	2	
Cheeky for a Reason	Released: 9 July 2012; Label: Cooking Vinyl; Formats: CD, digital download	9	1	—	—	—	72	—	1	
Ropewalk	Released: 3 September 2015; Label: Cooking Vinyl; Formats: CD, LP, digital download	21	2	—	—	—	—	—	2	
Exorcism of Youth	Released: 18 August 2023; Label: Cooking Vinyl; Formats: CD, LP, digital download	6	1	—	—	—	—	—	1	
"—" denotes a title that did not chart, or was not released in that territory.

=== Compilation albums ===
Title	Album details	Peak chart positions		
Title	Album details	UK	UK Indie	SCO
Seven Year Setlist	Released: June 2013; Label: Cooking Vinyl; Formats: CD, digital download	59	11	7

== Extended plays ==
Title	EP details	Peak chart positions
Title	EP details	UK Sales
The View EP	Released: March 2006; Label: Two Thumbs; Format: CD	—
Cutting Corners EP	Released: June 2011; Label: 1965 Records; Formats: CD, digital download	7
Tight Hopes EP	Released: 15 November 2013; Label: Cooking Vinyl; Format: Digital download	—
"—" denotes a title that did not chart, or was not released in that territory.

== Singles ==
List of singles, with selected chart positions and certifications
Title	Year	Peak chart positions								Certifications	Album
Title	Year	UK	UK Indie	AUS Hit.	EU	IRE	JPN Over.	POL	SCO	Certifications	Album
"Wasted Little DJs"	2006	15	—	—	—	—	—	—	1		Hats Off to the Buskers
"Superstar Tradesman"	2006	15	—	—	—	—	—	—	4		Hats Off to the Buskers
"Same Jeans"	2007	3	—	2	3	24	—	43	1	BPI: Platinum	Hats Off to the Buskers
"The Don" / "Skag Trendy"	2007	33	—	—	—	—	—	—	3		Hats Off to the Buskers
"Face for the Radio"	2007	69	—	—	—	—	—	—	5		Hats Off to the Buskers
"5 Rebbecca's"	2008	57	—	—	—	—	—	—	2		Which Bitch?
"Shock Horror"	2009	64	—	—	—	—	—	—	8		Which Bitch?
"Temptation Dice"	2009	— (Note: "Temptation Dice" did not enter the UK Singles Chart, but peaked at number 22 on the UK Physical Singles Chart.)	—	—	—	—	—	—	9		Which Bitch?
"Sunday"	2010	—	—	—	—	—	—	—	—		Bread and Circuses
"Grace"	2011	123	—	—	—	—	17	—	33		Bread and Circuses
"I Need That Record"	2011	— (Note: "I Need That Record" did not enter the UK Singles Chart, but peaked at number 18 on the UK Physical Singles Chart.)	—	—	—	—	—	—	—		Non-album single
"How Long"	2012	—	20	—	—	—	—	—	56		Cheeky for a Reason
"The Clock"	2012	—	—	—	—	—	—	—	—		Cheeky for a Reason
"Tacky Tattoo" / "Hold On Now"	2012	—	—	—	—	—	—	—	—		Cheeky for a Reason
"Standard"	2013	—	—	—	—	—	—	—	—		Seven Year Setlist
"Marriage"	2015	— (Note: "Marriage" did not enter the UK Singles Chart, but peaked at number 38 on the UK Physical Singles Chart.)	—	—	—	—	—	—	—		Ropewalk
"Psychotic"	2015	—	—	—	—	—	—	—	—		Ropewalk
"Under the Rug"	2015	—	—	—	—	—	—	—	—		Ropewalk
"Resonate"	2021	—	—	—	—	—	—	—	—		Non-album single
"Feels Like"	2023	—	—	—	—	—	—	—	—		Exorcism of Youth
"Neon Lights"	2023	—	—	—	—	—	—	—	—		Exorcism of Youth
"Shovel in His Hands"	2023	—	—	—	—	—	—	—	—		Exorcism of Youth
"Woman of the Year"	2023	—	—	—	—	—	—	—	—		Exorcism of Youth
"—" denotes a title that did not chart, or was not released in that territory.
