= Seven Year Setlist =

Greatest hits album by the View
- Released: 17 June 2013
- Recorded: 2006–2012
- Genre: Indie rock
- Label: Cooking Vinyl

The View chronology
Cheeky for a Reason (2012)	Seven Year Setlist (2013)	Ropewalk (2015)

Seven Year Setlist is a compilation album by the View, released on 17 June 2013. It charted at No. 7 in the Scottish Albums chart and #59 in the UK Albums Chart.

== Description ==
The compilation is titled "Seven Year Setlist" because it comprises songs frequently performed in the band's concerts, with the exception of the new tracks. The songs are arranged in a similar order to the band's setlists.

The compilation features several of the band's singles mixed with a couple of album tracks which feature heavily in the band's usual setlist. The album also includes 3 brand new unheard tracks - "Kill Kyle", "Dirty Magazine", and "Standard". These new songs have been produced by Ex-Oasis producer Owen Morris.

Kyle Falconer has said:

"Over the years there's been four studio albums, thousands of gigs, too much vodka and loads of memories on this crazy rock 'n' roll journey. So we wanted to create an album that was kinda like stopping and looking back over the years - with a few new tracks too. That's the Seven Year Setlist."

== Singles ==
"Standard" is the first and only single to be released from 'Seven Year Setlist', in promotion of the album.

== Track listing ==
All tracks are written by Kyle Falconer and Kieren Webster except where noted

No.	Title	Writer(s)	Length
1.	"Kill Kyle" (previously unreleased)		2:52
2.	"Grace" (from Bread and Circuses)		3:39
3.	"Wasted Little DJs" (from Hats Off to the Buskers)		4:00
4.	"5Rebbeccas" (from Which Bitch?)		3:50
5.	"How Long" (from Cheeky for a Reason)	Falconer, Katie Gwyther	2:55
6.	"The Don" (from Hats Off to the Buskers)		3:09
7.	"Skag Trendy" (from Hats Off to the Buskers)		3:03
8.	"Realisation" (from Which Bitch?)		3:41
9.	"Face for the Radio" (from Hats Off to the Buskers)		3:18
10.	"Tacky Tattoo" (from Cheeky for a Reason)		3:29
11.	"The Clock" (from Cheeky for a Reason)	Falconer, Webster, Angelo Petraglia	4:38
12.	"Standard" (previously unreleased)		3:23
13.	"Tragic Magic" (from Bread and Circuses)		4:19
14.	"Underneath The Lights" (from Bread and Circuses)		4:03
15.	"Same Jeans" (from Hats Off to the Buskers)		3:34
16.	"Dirty Magazine" (previously unreleased)		4:00
17.	"Superstar Tradesman" (from Hats Off to the Buskers)		3:16
18.	"Sunday" (from Bread and Circuses)		4:38
19.	"Shock Horror" (from Which Bitch?)		4:09
20.	"Distant Doubloon" (from Which Bitch?)	Falconer, Owen Morris	4:38
21.	"Standard (Album Mix)" (previously unreleased)		3:51

Japanese Edition Bonus Disc
No.	Title	Writer(s)	Length
22.	"Tight Hopes" (previously unreleased)
23.	"Where" (previously unreleased)	Falconer
24.	"Some Kind of Peace of Mind" (Cheeky for a Reason iTunes bonus track)
25.	"Addicted" (Amy Winehouse cover)	Amy Winehouse
26.	"The Clock (Radio Edit)" (from Cheeky for a Reason)	Falconer, Webster, Angelo Petraglia
27.	"How Long (Gifted Live Session)" (previously unreleased)	Falconer, Katie Gwyther
28.	"Reaction" (Cheeky for a Reason iTunes bonus track)
29.	"AB (We Need Treatment) (Demo)" (previously unreleased)
30.	"Pint, Pages and Pen (Demo)" (previously unreleased)
31.	"It's Behind Me (Demo)" (previously unreleased)
