= Cutting Corners (EP) =

Cutting Corners EP

EP by the View
- Released: 13 June 2013
- Genre: Indie rock
- Label: 1965 Records

The View chronology
The View EP (2006)	Cutting Corners EP (2013)	Tight Hopes EP (2013)

Cutting Corners EP is an EP by the View, to be released on 13 June 2013. It is the second EP to be released by the band, following The View EP.

Two tracks from the EP, "Sunday" and "Happy", were previously included on the band's album Bread and Circuses.

== Track listing ==
1. "Sunday"
2. "Happy"
3. "Sideways"
4. "Alone"
5. "Sunday (Tim Hutton Mix)"
