= Tacky Tattoo =

Single by The View

from the album Cheeky for a Reason
- Released: 2 Dec 2012
- Recorded: 2012
- Genre: Indie rock
- Length: 3:02, 3:01 (Digital Download)
- Label: Cooking Vinyl
- Songwriters: Kyle Falconer, Kieren Webster

The View singles chronology
| "The Clock" (2012) | "Tacky Tattoo" (2012) | "Standard" (2013) |

"Tacky Tattoo" is a song by Dundee band The View. It was released on 2 December 2012 with "Hold On Now" as a double A-side single. It follows the singles "How Long" and "The Clock" and is taken from the band's fourth album Cheeky for a Reason.

== Track listing ==
- Digital Download, 7" Vinyl, CD single
1. "Tacky Tattoo (Radio Edit)" – 3:02
2. "Hold on Now (Radio Edit)" – 3:01
3. "Addicted (Amy Winehouse Cover)" – 2:33
