= How Long (The View song) =

Single by The View

from the album Cheeky for a Reason
- Released: 9 July 2012
- Genre: Indie rock, power pop
- Length: 2:54 (Digital Download)
- Label: 1965 Records
- Songwriters: Kyle Falconer, Kieren Webster

The View singles chronology
"Grace" (2011)	"How Long" (2012)	"The Clock" (2012)

"How Long" is the first single released by Dundee band The View from their fourth album Cheeky for a Reason. The song was first announced by NME on 27 May 2012 as the first single to be released on The Views anticipated new album Cheeky for a Reason. The song was officially made available for download from iTunes on 6 June 2012, a whole month before the anticipated release date.

The music video for the song was released on 13 June 2012. The video, written and directed by Red and starring Martin Compston caused controversy in the media on its release, due to its assumed subject matter and further claims from one of the cast that the content for the video was never disclosed to her. However, the bands management, record label and producers of the video later proved that all cast were given a detailed treatment, that disclosed the concept of the video prior to filming. Red, the writer and director of the video said of the idea, "The concept becomes complicated when I try to put it into words, the video has not been submitted into any festivals nor won any awards as awards are judged in committee by consensus of what is known. It has however been banned from MTV for some unknown reason".

The song was generally well received, with many reviewers highlighting the fact that The View have revisited their Libertine-esque early years whilst at the same time maturing musically as a band. NME said of the song – "a frantic little earworm of a song that takes precisely six seconds to reach its first chorus, and never lets up thereafter". However, the progressively dismal chart performance of The View's singles continued, as the song failed to chart in the UK.

== Track listing ==
- Digital Download
1. "How Long" – 2:54
