= 5 Rebbecca's =

2008 single by The View

Single by The View
- Released: 27 October 2008
- Genre: Garage rock
- Length: 11:53 (CD)
- Label: 1965 Records
- Songwriters: Kyle Falconer, Kieren Webster

The View singles chronology
"Face for the Radio" (2007)	"5 Rebbecca's" (2008)	"Shock Horror" (2009)

"5 Rebbecca's" is the first single released by Dundee indie band The View from their second album Which Bitch?. The single was released on 27 October 2008.

The music video for the single was released on YouTube on 23 September 2008, with a handwritten version of the lyrics released on the band's website two days later. The video itself features a mixture of live action footage with animation.

In its first week after release, the single marked a disappointing return for The View, only reaching number 57 on the UK Singles Chart before dropping out of the UK top 100 the following week. In Scotland, however, the song debuted at number two, giving the band their third top-three single there, after the number-one singles "Wasted Little DJs" and "Same Jeans".

== Track listing ==
- UK CD
1. "5 Rebbecca's" – 3:51
2. "Dun Deal" – 4:46
3. "Mr Men Book" – 3:16
- UK 7"
1. "5 Rebbecca's"
2. "For You"

== Charts ==
Chart (2008)	Peak position
Scottish Singles Sales (Official Charts)	2
UK Singles (Official Charts)	57
