= Gerard Kearns =

English actor (born 1984)

- Born: 4 October 1984 (age 41); Mossley, Greater Manchester, England
- Occupation: Actor
- Years active: 2003–present
- Spouse: Sarah Kearns (m. 2017)
- Children: 2

Gerard Kearns (born 4 October 1984) is an English actor.

== Career ==
Kearns starred in the film The Mark of Cain, for Film4 Productions, based on British soldiers' abuse of Iraqi prisoners. It premiered at the International Film Festival Rotterdam in February 2007.

He has also starred in the short films Grandad and The 10th Man and has appeared in a number of TV shows such as The Commander starring Amanda Burton, and a main role as Ian Gallagher in Shameless for seven series, from 2004 to 2010.

In 2007, he appeared in the videos for The View's double A-side "The Don" and "Skag Trendy". In 2011, he also featured as a voice over for BBC's GCSE Bitesize Revision.

Kearns was cast in the second series of the BBC 1 daytime show Moving On. The episode "Trust", directed by Illy, tells the story of Kearns's character Jack, who is caught trying to burgle the house of elderly ex-boxer Eddie, played by Roy Marsden.

He has also made several appearances in The Accrington Pals, a play by Peter Whelan, portraying the character Ralph, a young volunteer officer during the First World War. He also starred opposite Matthew Kelly in the West End play Sign of the Times.

Kearns also starred in the BBC drama Our World War, marking the centenary of the First World War and as Halig in the series The Last Kingdom.

== Personal life ==
From Mossley, near Ashton-under-Lyne, Greater Manchester, he was educated in Oldham at St Augustine's Catholic School. He later studied at Ashton Sixth Form College in Ashton-under-Lyne. He is a supporter of Manchester City F.C.

He has been married to Sarah Kearns since 2017. They have two children.

== Filmography ==
=== Television ===
Year	Title	Role	Notes
2004	Holby City	Russell Coulter	episode "Out of Control"
2004	Heartbeat	Trevor Black	episode "Muck and Brass"
2004–2010	Shameless	Ian Gallagher	Main, 80 episodes
2005	Doctors	Revs	episode "0–60"
2007	Foyle's War	Frank Morgan	episode "Casualties of War"
2007	The Commander	Terry Donnolly	episode "Windows of the Soul"
2009	Red Riding	Leonard Cole	episodes "1974" and "1983"
2011	Moving On	Jack	1 episode
2012	The Town	Daniel	3 episodes
2014	The Smoke	Little Al	8 episodes
2014	Our World War	Chas Rowland	episode "War Machine"
2015–2017	The Last Kingdom	Halig	5 episodes
2019	Chernobyl	Pravik	2 episodes
2020	The English Game	Tommy Marshall	Main, six part series
2022	The Essex Serpent	Henry Banks	6 episodes
2022	Floodlights	Andy Woodward	Main
2023	The Day of the Jackal	Gary Cobb	3 episodes
2026	Silent Witness	DC Jonno Magath	Series 29, "The Enemy Within Part 1 & 2"
2026	Waiting for the Out	Dan's Dad	5 episodes

=== Film ===
Year	Title	Role	Notes
2005	Grandad	Vincent	Short
2006	The 10th Man	The 10th Man	Short
2007	The Mark of Cain	Mark 'Treacle' Tate	
2009	Looking for Eric	Ryan	
2010	Honeymooner	Fran	
2012	The Rise	Charlie	
2016	Trespass Against Us	Lester	
