= Skag Trendy (song) =

"The Don/Skag Trendy"

Single by The View

from the album Hats Off to the Buskers
- Released: 23 April 2007
- Genre: Indie rock
- Length: 3:00
- Label: 1965 Records
- Songwriters: Kyle Falconer, Kieren Webster
- Producer: Owen Morris

The View singles chronology
"Same Jeans" (2007)	"The Don/Skag Trendy" (2007)	"Face for the Radio" (2007)

"Skag Trendy" is the fourth single by Dundee band The View, it was released on 23 April 2007 as a double A-side along with "The Don". It follows the singles "Wasted Little DJs", "Superstar Tradesman" and "Same Jeans", and is taken from the debut album Hats Off to the Buskers. The single did not do as well as its predecessors, only reaching a disappointing #33 in the UK Singles Chart. One of the B-sides, "I've Just Seen a Face", is a Beatles cover.

== Music video ==
The video for "Skag Trendy" features Gerard Kearns from Channel 4 TV series Shameless depicting someone who has decided not to choose life.

== Charts ==
Chart (2009)	Peak position
UK Singles Chart	33

== Track listing ==
- UK CD
1. "The Don"
2. "Skag Trendy"
3. "I've Just Seen a Face"
4. "The Don (Video)"
5. "Skag Trendy (Video)"
- UK 7" (green)
1. "Skag Trendy"
2. "The Don (Live from London Astoria)"
  - This is the only physical format with "Skag Trendy" as the actual A-side.
