= Exorcism of Youth =

Studio album by the View
- Released: 18 August 2023
- Studio: El Mirador, Granada, Spain
- Genre: Indie rock
- Length: 47:21
- Label: Cooking Vinyl
- Producer: Youth

The View chronology
Ropewalk (2015)	Exorcism of Youth (2023)

Exorcism of Youth is the sixth studio album by Scottish indie rock band the View, released on 18 August 2023 through Cooking Vinyl. It is the band's first album in eight years, following Ropewalk (2015) and their five-year hiatus. It was inspired by the Killers' Pressure Machine (2020), which frontman Kyle Falconer listened to during COVID-19 lockdowns, as well as Sam Fender. The title of the album had derived from an essay written by band member Kieren Webster.

== Critical reception ==
Professional ratings
Review scores
Source	Rating
Clash	7/10
The Irish Times	3/5 stars
NME	4/5 stars
The Scotsman	4/5 stars

Mark Beaumont of NME wrote that while the first half "could easily slide into the playlist indie furrow" with "bare-chested heartbreak" and "choruses to shoulder-lift girlfriends to", "by its second half, the album is hoofing modern indie rock conventions overboard by the barrel-load", as "what at first resembled a cap-in-hand re-application to the indie rock fraternity ends as minor coup, restructuring its tired constitutions and pointing all manner of ways out of the rut". The Scotsman's Fiona Shepherd called the album "fresh, youthful, almost gamine, with frontman Kyle Falconer flexing his pop muscles, co-singer/bassist Kieren Webster bringing the headlong energy and guitarist Pete Reilly joining the songwriting party for the first time". Robin Murray of Clash stated that the band "build on the past while refusing to be hemmed in by it" as they "navigat[e] a forward path" on the album. Murray remarked that while "once indie darlings, the band now find themselves on the verge of becoming elder statesmen – it's a record that shows there is plenty of fire in their bellies".

Lauren Murphy of The Irish Times felt that "as hummable and melodic as this toe-tappy indie-rock collection is – and as capable as The View are of writing a rousing chorus – there is a sense that this could be any band from the mid- to late-noughties indie scene", concluding that "their longevity has arguably been at the expense of progress".

== Track listing ==
All tracks are written by Kyle Falconer, Peter Reilly, and Kieren Webster, except "Dixie" co-written by Rianne Downey and "Woman of the Year" co-written by Dave Green.

Exorcism of Youth track listing
No.	Title	Length
1.	"Exorcism of Youth"	3:38
2.	"Feels Like"	4:08
3.	"The Wonder of It All"	3:16
4.	"Arctic Sun"	2:52
5.	"Shovel in His Hands"	3:47
6.	"Allergic to Mornings"	5:10
7.	"Black Mirror"	5:03
8.	"Neon Lights"	3:21
9.	"Dixie"	4:16
10.	"Woman of the Year"	3:18
11.	"Footprints in the Sand"	3:36
12.	"Tangled"	4:56
Total length:		47:21

== Charts ==
Chart performance for Exorcism of Youth
Chart (2023)	Peak position
Scottish Albums (OCC)	1
UK Albums (OCC)	6
UK Independent Albums (OCC)	1
