= The Metros =

English indie band

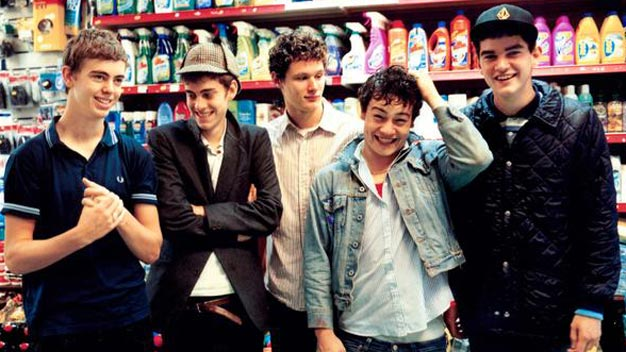
- The Metros in 2007

Background information
- Origin: Peckham, South London, England
- Genres: Indie rock
- Years active: 2006–2009
- Label: 1965 Records (Sony BMG/Columbia)
- Members: Charlie Elliott (bass); Freddi Hyde-Thompson (drums); Jak Payne (swag guitar); Joseph Pancucci-Simpson (lead guitar); Saul Adamczewski (vocals)

The Metros were an English five-piece indie/punk band from Peckham, South London. Founded by vocalist Saul Adamczewski and lead guitarist Jak Payne, the band was formed while most of the members were still at school.

Their song 'sexual riot' also featured in Season 2 Episode 12: "It's a Wonderful Lie" of Gossip Girl.

== Background ==
The Metros dubbed themselves a 'punk and roll' band and were from a musical background—Adamczewski's father designed record sleeves for A&M and Payne's father played session bass for Glenn Tilbrook. After recording a 5 track demo over two days in March 2006 in Honor Oak Park London with The Mysterious Hand, the band worked with Baxter Dury and were signed to 1965 Records by James Endeacott (who had previously signed The Libertines, The Strokes and The View). When all five members were still under 18. The Guardian described them as "Punk'n'roll urchins".

Formerly known as Eastern Bloc and The Wanking Skankers, they listed Squeeze, Ian Dury and Beastie Boys as their major influences. Dury's son, Baxter Dury, also acted as their producer.

Their debut single, "Education Pt. 2", was released on 17 March 2008. Their second single, "Last of the Lookers", was released on 2 June 2008.

== Live music ==
In summer 2007, The Metros played at T in the Park, Bestival, the Hackney Underage Festival, The Great Escape in Brighton, the Skegness Big Reunion Festival, and the BBC Electric Proms. They were booked to support The Coral, but were replaced after throwing a glass bottle into the crowd at the first gig, which smashed on and injured a girl spectator.

They performed live on the first episode of the BBC Three TV show Lily Allen and Friends in 2008 after winning the vote to perform over other bands in the "Best Young New Music" category.

The band supported Madness at a special gig in aid of The Teenage Cancer Trust on 3 April 2008, at the Royal Albert Hall.

They played the Radio 1/NME Stage at the 2008 Reading and Leeds festivals.

On 2 July 2009, the Metros announced they were splitting up with two farewell shows, with lead singer Saul saying, "The Metros are going their separate ways."

Saul, alongside Joseph at one point, has since been playing in Fat White Family.

== Discography ==
=== Singles ===
- "Education Pt. 2" (17 March 2008, 1965 Records)
- "Last of the Lookers" (2 June 2008, 1965 Records) UK No. 102
- "Talk About It" (8 September 2008, 1965 Records)

=== Album ===
- More Money Less Grief (15 September 2008, 1965 Records) UK No. 116
