= The Don (The View song) =

"The Don/Skag Trendy"

Single by The View

from the album Hats Off to the Buskers
- Released: 23 April 2007
- Genre: Indie rock; indie pop
- Length: 3:09
- Label: 1965 Records
- Songwriter(s): Kyle Falconer, Kieren Webster
- Producer(s): Owen Morris

The View singles chronology
"Same Jeans" (2007)	"The Don" / "Skag Trendy" (2007)	"Face for the Radio" (2007)

"The Don" is the fourth single by Dundee band The View. It was released on 23 April 2007 as a double A-side along with "Skag Trendy". It follows the singles "Wasted Little DJs", "Superstar Tradesman" and "Same Jeans", and is taken from the debut album Hats Off to the Buskers. The single reached number 33 in the UK Singles Chart, the band's final UK top 40 single.

== Charts ==
Chart (2009)	Peak position
UK Singles (OCC)	33

== Track listing ==
- UK CD
1. "The Don"
2. "Skag Trendy"
3. "I've Just Seen a Face"
4. "The Don (Video)"
5. "Skag Trendy (Video)"
- UK 7" (clear orange)
1. "The Don"
2. "Fireworks & Flowers (Live from The Royal Albert Hall)"
