= Shock Horror =

Single by The View
- Released: 2 February 2009
- Genre: Indie rock; garage rock; post-punk revival
- Length: 9:11 (CD), 4:08 (7")
- Label: 1965 Records
- Songwriters: Kyle Falconer, Kieren Webster, Pete Reilly, Steve Morrison

The View singles chronology
"5Rebbeccas" (2008)	"Shock Horror" (2009)	"Temptation Dice" (2009)

"Shock Horror" is the second single released by Scottish band The View, from their second album Which Bitch?. The B-side on the CD release is "My Mother". The song was available in MP3 format from 5 December 2008, when the 7" was pre-ordered from the band's official website.

The video for the song was released in December 2008. The song received better airplay than the previous single "5Rebbeccas" did, but it performed even worse than its predecessor, charting only at No. 64 in the UK Singles Chart before dropping to No. 94 in its second week.

== Track listing ==
- UK CD
1. "Shock Horror" - 4:08
2. "My Mother" - 5:03

== Band members ==
- Kieren Webster - Bass guitar
- Pete Reilly - Lead guitarist
- Kyle Falconer - Lead singer, rhythm guitarist, piano
- Steve Morrison - Drums
