= Newman Catholic College (Oldham) =

Coordinates: 53.5382°N 2.1521°W

Saint John Henry Newman Catholic College
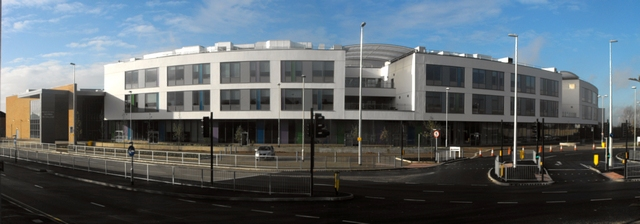

Location
- Canon Dolan Way; Chadderton, Greater Manchester, OL9 9QY; England

Information
- Type: Voluntary aided school
- Motto: Dignity and Excellence
- Religious affiliation: Roman Catholic
- Established: 2011
- Local authority: Oldham
- Department for Education URN: 136432 Tables
- Ofsted: Reports
- Head teacher: Kerry Philips
- Gender: Coeducational
- Age: 11 to 16
- Enrolment: 1,570
- Website: www.newmanrc.oldham.sch.uk

Newman Catholic College or, in full, Saint John Henry Newman RC College is a coeducational Roman Catholic secondary school located in Chadderton, in the Metropolitan Borough of Oldham, Greater Manchester, England under the Roman Catholic Diocese of Salford. It was opened under the name the Blessed John Henry Newman College; the subsequent canonisation of Cardinal Newman (2019) led to a corresponding change of name.

The school was formed in 2011 from the amalgamation of St Augustine of Canterbury RC High School in Werneth, Oldham and Our Lady's R.C. High School in Royton. The merged school was originally based over the two former school sites, but has now moved to a new building.

In the Ofsted inspection of February 2013 the school was judged as inadequate. In the inspection of May 2015 it was rated as 'good'. In the most recent inspection of May 2023, the school was rated as 'requires improvement'

The school was built through the Private Finance Initiative (PFI) route. This means that the school has no direct control over the building stock. The building has had recurrent problems, especially with heating and hot water, which have led to the school having to close on occasion.
