= Face for the Radio =

Single by The View

from the album Hats Off to the Buskers
- Released: 25 June 2007
- Recorded: 2006
- Genre: Indie pop
- Length: 3:18
- Label: 1965 Records
- Songwriters: Kyle Falconer, Kieren Webster
- Producer: Owen Morris

The View singles chronology
"The Don" / "Skag Trendy" (2007)	"Face for the Radio" (2007)	"5Rebbeccas" (2008)

"Face for the Radio" is the fifth single to be released by Dundee band The View, and the last to be released from their debut album Hats Off to the Buskers. It was released in the United Kingdom on 25 June 2007 (see 2007 in British music) on CD and 7" vinyl formats.

"Face for the Radio" is entirely acoustic, and is the only acoustic track on the Hats Off to the Buskers album. The title may refer to a friendly radio DJ known to the band.

The song was BBC Radio 1 DJ Edith Bowman's Record of the Week for the week commencing 23 May, the same week in which it entered the C-list in the Radio 1 playlist. It was promoted to the B-list for the week commencing 6 June. The band performed the track on 1 March 2007 at the 2007 Shockwaves NME Awards, on the same night they won the award for "Best Track" with their debut single, "Wasted Little DJs". There are also notably no proper B-sides on the single.

The single was not a commercial success, receiving very little airplay on mainstream radio. It was The View's first single that had failed to reach the UK Top 40, peaking at No. 69. It was the band's lowest charting single at that point up until "Temptation Dice".

== Charts ==
Chart (2009)	Peak position
UK Singles Chart	69

== Track listing ==
- UK CD
1. "Face for the Radio" – 3:18
2. "Streetlights" (Live from Caird Hall)
3. "Face for the Radio" (Video) – 3:18
4. Dryburgh Style (Video) – 6:27
  - This is the same video that is available with the purchase of Hats Off to the Buskers on the iTunes Store.
- UK 7"
1. "Face for the Radio" – 3:18
2. Etching
