= St Augustine of Canterbury Roman Catholic High School =

R.C. High School

Location
- Grange Avenue; Oldham, Greater Manchester, OL84ED; England

Information
- Type: High School
- Religious affiliation: Roman Catholic
- Local authority: Metropolitan Borough of Oldham
- Gender: Co-educational
- Age: 11 to 16
- Enrolment: 650 (approx.)
- Website: http://www.staugustineoldham.com/

St Augustine of Canterbury RC High Specialist Humanities School was a Roman Catholic high school for 11- to 16-year-olds, located in Werneth within the Metropolitan Borough of Oldham, Greater Manchester, England under the Roman Catholic Diocese of Salford. The school was a specialist school in the Humanities, and comprised 650 students.

The school was previously known as St. Anselm's before it merged with another Oldham school (St Albans) in the late 1980s.

The school, was closed as the result of amalgamation on Aug. 31, 2011. It merged with Our Lady's RC High School to form Blessed John Henry Newman RC College. The new school is on a site in Chadderton and St. Augustine's vacated buildings were demolished in 2013. The last headteacher of St. Augustine's, Mr Michael McGhee, became the first headteacher of the new school.

The final OFSTED report (2009) indicated that the school was 'satisfactory' and had a 'good capacity for sustained improvement.'

== Notable former pupils ==
- Gerard Kearns – actor
- Mark Owen – singer-songwriter, member of Take That
- Lee Rourke – novelist
