= Our Lady's Roman Catholic High School, Royton =

Coordinates: 53.5618°N 2.1207°W

R.C. High School
- Oldham, Greater Manchester; England

Information
- Type: High School
- Motto: Mater Dei (Mother Of God)
- Religious affiliation: Roman Catholic
- Established: 1961 - 2011
- Local authority: Metropolitan Borough of Oldham
- Gender: Co-educational
- Age: 11 to 18
- Enrolment: 1,200 (approx.)
- Colours: Blue & White
- Website: http://www.ourladyshigh.oldham.sch.uk/

Our Lady's R.C. High School was a Roman Catholic high school and sixth form for 11- to 18-year-olds, located in Royton, in the Metropolitan Borough of Oldham, Greater Manchester, England. The school was a specialist school in Mathematics and Computing, and contained over 80 members of staff, with over 1200 students. The sixth form college offered 19 (as of the 2007/08 academic year) courses.

The school had a dispute in 2010 after Headteacher R. Whittaker was suspended. His Deputy Headteacher, C. Spillaine became Acting Headteacher, but left the school at the end of 2010 after disagreements with the students. The most recent Headteacher was Mr Thornton who left when the school merged with St Augustine of Canterbury RC High School to form Blessed John Henry Newman RC College, a joint Roman Catholic School.

== History ==
The school was founded in 1961 as a secondary modern school with 259 pupils. The first head teacher was Eric Critchley. In 1979, further building took place for the school to become an 11-16 comprehensive school for 700 pupils. In 1985, the school's sixth form college opened, converting the school into an 11-18 comprehensive school. The sixth form then had only 11 students. In 1986, the school was reorganised as part of an Oldham Roman Catholic Schools' reorganisation prompting further building work and raising the school's capacity to 800 pupils.

The school was last inspected by OFSTED in May 2010.

In 2010 Glyn Potts, Head of Public Services at Our Lady's RC High School was awarded the 'Inspirational Educators' prize in the 'Further and Higher Education' category by the Company of Educators, one of the London Livery Companies.

== Notable alumni ==
- Nick Grimshaw
