= Ripchord =

English four piece rock band

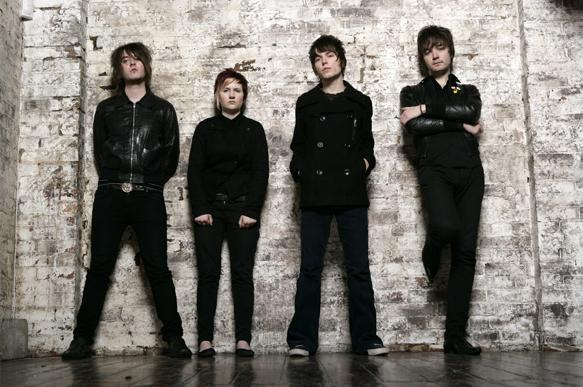

Background information
- Origin: Wolverhampton, England
- Genre: Indie rock
- Years active: 2004–2008
- Label: 1965 Records
- Members: Phil Wallbank; James Sullivan; Tom Beal; Roz Duignan-Pearson
- Website: http://www.ripchord.co.uk https://www.myspace.com/ripchorduk

Ripchord was an English four piece rock band, formed in 2004 in Wolverhampton. The band supported acts such as The Kooks, Babyshambles and The Kaiser Chiefs. They took their name from the Radiohead song 'Ripcord' with an added 'h'.

The band was signed to 1965 Records and released two singles – "Lock Up Your Daughters (And Throw Away The Key)" and "Backstabber".

== History ==
It was not long before Ripchord had raised enough money from performing to record some demos of their songs at Mad Hat Recording Studios in Wolverhampton. These demos were sold at gigs and one was sent off to a search for the best young band in the West Midlands in 2005. This search was known as the School of Rock and as made by the BBC. The search was eventually narrowed down to the six bands that celebrity judges, including Roy Wood and Janice Long, selected. The show concluded with a vote for who the public felt was the best band. Ripchord won this vote and gained the prize of funding for more demos and filming a music video.

Following the band's win, they were signed by James Endeacott, founder of 1965 Records.

The band's first single, "Lock Up Your Daughters (And Throw Away The Key)" was a limited-edition vinyl with only 1,000 copies made. The single was recorded at Elevator Studios in Liverpool and produced by Ian Broudie, and peaked at number 45 of the Official Physical Singles Chart.

The band released their debut album, Beginner's Luck, in 2009; produced by Steve Power, the album was recorded three times over two years before it was ready for release.

The band are now defunct. Beal is currently a member of Splashh.

== Members ==
- Phil Wallbank – Lead Singer, Rhythm Guitarist
- James Sullivan – Lead Guitarist
- Tom Beal – Bassist
- Roz Duignan-Pearson – Drums

== Releases ==
=== Albums ===
- Beginner's Luck (2009).

=== EPs ===
- Secrets and Scandals (demo)

=== Singles ===
- "Lock Up Your Daughters (And Throw Away The Key)" (2006)
- "Backstabber" (2007)
