= Ropewalk (album) =

Studio album by the View
- Released: 4 September 2015
- Recorded: Clouds Hill studios, Hamburg
- Genres: Indie rock; post-punk revival; folk rock
- Length: 35:03
- Label: Cooking Vinyl
- Producers: Albert Hammond Jr., Gus Oberg

The View chronology
Cheeky for a Reason (2012)	Ropewalk (2015)	Exorcism of Youth (2023)

Singles from Ropewalk
- 1. "Marriage" Released: 10 March 2015; 2. "Psychotic" Released: 12 May 2015; 3. "Under the Rug" Released: 15 August 2015

Ropewalk is the fifth studio album by Scottish indie rock band the View. It was released on 4 September 2015 through Cooking Vinyl. The album was produced by Albert Hammond Jr. of The Strokes, and Gus Oberg, producer for the same band. Drew McConnell of Babyshambles introduced Kyle Falconer to the duo. The band chose to record the album at Clouds Hill studios, in Hamburg, Germany. Justin Gerrish, famous for his work with Vampire Weekend, produced the final mix in New York City.

== Reception ==
Ropewalk received favourable reviews from critics. Metacritic gave the album a score of 74 out of 100, based on 4 critic reviews. NME gave it an 8/10 score on their review, saying: "While the barometer of public taste has shifted from the days when working class boys-with-guitars were rife, you have to applaud The View for updating their legacy without resorting to déjà-View or an EDM chart-landgrab."

== Track listing ==
All songs written by Kyle Falconer and Kieren Webster, except ‘Under the Rug' by Pete Reilly

Ropewalk track listing
No.	Title	Length
1.	"Under the Rug"	3:36
2.	"Marriage"	3:31
3.	"Living"	3:14
4.	"Talk About Two"	3:31
5.	"Psychotic"	3:37
6.	"Cracks"	2:59
7.	"Tenement Light"	3:38
8.	"House of Queue's"	4:06
9.	"Penny"	3:19
10.	"Voodoo Doll"	3:32
Total length:		35:03

== Personnel ==
=== The View ===
- Kyle Falconer – lead vocals, rhythm guitar
- Kieren Webster – bass guitar, backing vocals
- Pete Reilly – lead guitar
- Steven Morrison – drums, percussion

=== Production ===
- Albert Hammond Jr. – producer
- Gus Oberg – producer
- Justin Gerrish – mixing

== Charts ==
Chart performance for Ropewalk
Chart (2015)	Peak position
Scottish Albums (Official Charts)	2
UK Albums (Official Charts)	21
