= Which Bitch? =

Studio album by the View
- Released: 2 February 2009
- Recorded: 2008
- Genres: Indie rock; garage rock; Celtic rock; folk punk
- Label: 1965
- Producers: The View; Owen Morris

The View chronology
Hats Off to the Buskers (2007)	Which Bitch? (2009)	Bread and Circuses (2011)

Singles from Which Bitch?
- 1. "5Rebeccas" Released: 27 October 2008; 2. "Shock Horror" Released: 2 February 2009; 3. "Temptation Dice" Released: 13 April 2009

Professional ratings
Aggregate scores
Source	Rating
Metacritic	69/100
Review scores
Source	Rating
AllMusic	2.5/5 stars
BBC	(favorable)
The Fly	3/5 stars
The Guardian	1/5 stars
NME	(7/10)
The Skinny	3/5 stars
The Times	3/5 stars

Which Bitch? is the second album from Scottish band the View which was released 2 February 2009. Paolo Nutini guests on the track "Covers". "Gem of a Bird" is about Kyle Falconer's girlfriend Katie Gwyther, with whom the song is a duet.

The album received mixed reviews from critics and debuted at number 4 on the official UK Albums chart in its first week of release, but in stark contrast to its predecessor Hats Off to the Buskers it dropped down the charts quickly and spent two weeks in the UK top 40; it fell to No. 27 in its second week before dropping out altogether. Three singles were released from the album but all failed to reach the top 40; "5 Rebbecca's" and "Shock Horror" charted at No. 57 and #64 respectively. The album's third single "Temptation Dice" did not chart.

== Track listing ==
All songs written by Kyle Falconer and Kieren Webster, except ‘Distant Doubloon’ Written by Kyle Falconer and Owen Morris

1. "Typical Time 2" – 1:36
2. "5 Rebecca's" – 3:50
3. "One Off Pretender" – 3:29
4. "Unexpected" – 3:39
5. "Temptation Dice" – 3:47
6. "Glass Smash" – 4:20
7. "Distant Doubloon" – 4:36
8. "Jimmy's Crazy Conspiracy" – 3:47
9. "Covers" – 3:23
10. "Double Yellow Lines" – 4:09
11. "Shock Horror" – 4:07
12. "Realisation" – 3:41
13. "Give Back the Sun" – 5:54
14. "Gem of a Bird" – 3:32

== Chart performance ==
Chart	Providers	Peak
The Official UK Album Chart	BPI / The Official UK Charts Company	4
