= Dryburgh, Dundee =

Area of Dundee, Scotland

Coordinates: 56.478333°N 3.022222°W

Dryburgh
- Location within Dundee City council area Location within Scotland
- Population: 1,304
- Council area: Dundee City
- Lieutenancy area: Dundee
- Country: Scotland
- Sovereign state: United Kingdom
- Postcode district: DD2
- Police: Scotland
- Fire: Scottish
- Ambulance: Scottish
- UK Parliament: Dundee Central
- Scottish Parliament: Dundee City West

Dryburgh is a residential district of Dundee, Scotland, located in the western part of the city. The area primarily consists of housing estates and local amenities, with strong community ties and a notable presence in Dundee’s football and music scenes.

Dryburgh Stores as featured in the music and imagery of The View

== History ==
Dryburgh was developed as part of Dundee’s post-war housing expansion, providing homes for families relocating from older, overcrowded parts of the city. The area has undergone various phases of development, with improvements to local facilities and housing stock over the years.

The district was formerly home to Dryburgh Primary School, which operated until its closure in 1985. The building was later repurposed as an Education Resource Centre before being demolished in 2018.

In recent years, Dryburgh has seen continued regeneration efforts, with improvements in housing, public spaces, and local amenities.

== Sport ==
Dryburgh is home to one of Dundee’s longest-running boys’ football clubs, Dryburgh Athletic, which has been a key part of the local sporting community for decades. The club provides training and competitive opportunities for young players.

== Cultural significance ==
The area has strong connections to Dundee’s music scene, particularly through the rock band The View, which formed in Dryburgh. Several of their music videos prominently feature locations in the area, including their 2006 track "Superstar Tradesman", as well as "Skag Trendy" and "The Don" in 2007. These videos also include scenes from nearby Lochee, such as Davies’ Cafe on Lochee High Street.
