= The Mark of Cain (2007 film) =

2007 British television film about war crimes

- Cover art
- Written by: Tony Marchant
- Directed by: Marc Munden
- Starring: Matthew McNulty; Gerard Kearns; Leo Gregory; Shaun Dooley
- Music by: Ben Bartlett
- Country of origin: United Kingdom
- Original language: English

Production
- Producers: Lynn Horsford; Liza Marshall; Nicola Shindler; Katy Jones
- Cinematography: Matt Gray
- Editor: Philip Kloss
- Running time: 90 min.

Original release
- Network: Channel 4
- Release: 12 April 2007

The Mark of Cain is a BAFTA Award-winning British television film first broadcast in 2007 following two young British soldiers deployed to Iraq as they experience the extremity of war for the first time, and the permanent effects of what they have seen and done as they return from their tour of duty. When a war crime that they took part in comes to light, they must choose whether to keep faith with their fellow soldiers or tell the truth about what happened.

The film's title comes from Royal Irish Regiment Colonel Tim Collins's 2003 eve-of-battle speech in Iraq, though the colonel would disavow the film in light of its broadcast date coinciding with the 2007 Iranian seizure of Royal Navy personnel.

== Plot ==
The film begins with a flashforward of Private Shane Gulliver (Matthew McNulty) of the fictional Northdale Rifles regiment marching to a court martial. The film then cuts to Gulliver, fellow private and childhood friend Mark Tate (Gerard Kearns), and other soldiers from the regiment arriving in Basra, Iraq. The soldiers' commanding officer, Major Godber (Shaun Dingwall), tells them to treat the Iraqi people with respect and adds that, "to paraphrase a certain colonel in the Royal Irish, anyone who needlessly kills or mistreats [...] will have the Mark of Cain upon them". After some initial patrol actions, including one where a suspected petrol smuggler from Kuwait has to be publicly beaten in order to avoid his lynching, the soldiers are ambushed by insurgents; Godber tries to convince a panic-stricken Territorial Army soldier to leave his vehicle and regroup with the others, but an explosion incinerates both of them.

Some time later, the soldiers are briefed that the insurgents who ambushed them came from a nearby village; they arrest several Iraqis during the subsequent search-and-detain operation. The detainees are initially placed under guard for later collection by the Royal Military Police (RMP), but lingering anger over Major Godber's death soon causes the soldiers to begin physically and sexually abusing them, with Gulliver taking trophy photographs. Corporal Gant (Shaun Dooley) attempts to make a reluctant Tate join in by appealing to his loyalty to the unit; when this fails, he tells Tate that no one will look out for him the next time they are on patrol, at which point the private gives in to Gant's demands. Afterwards, Tate seeks out the unit chaplain who tells him that feelings within the unit have been running high following Godber's death and that the private should look to his own conscience. The Iraqis' injuries, which are severe enough to leave one of them in a coma, are covered up as having been sustained during an escape attempt.

Following the battalion's return to Britain, Gulliver eagerly recalls the events of the tour, and shows his trophy photographs to his girlfriend, while Tate struggles to put his experiences behind him. After Gulliver's girlfriend discovers that he has been cheating on her, she reports him to the civilian police over the photographs; they refer the case to the RMP who arrest Gulliver along with Tate and Gant. Gant, a popular and decorated soldier who is due to be promoted to sergeant, receives a minor punishment from his regimental commanders, while Gulliver and Tate are slated to be court-martialed and are painted as "rotten apples" who acted alone.

With his mental state rapidly deteriorating, Tate ends up committing suicide. Gulliver initially wants to remain loyal to his fellow soldiers, but when the newly promoted Gant fails to attend Tate's funeral and tells Gulliver that his fellow soldier killed himself because he was weak-willed, the callous reaction spurs him to expose how Gant and other soldiers abused the detained Iraqis. When Gulliver is returned to his cell after his court martial, his erstwhile comrades pummel him for his perceived betrayal.

== Cast ==
- Barry Sloane as Glynn
- Matthew McNulty as Private Shane Gulliver
- Gerard Kearns as Private Mark "Treacle" Tate
- Leo Gregory as Lance Corporal Quealy
- Shaun Dooley as Corporal (later Sergeant) Gant
- Naomi Bentley as Shelley
- Shaun Dingwall as Major Godber
- Dhaffer L'Abidine as Omar Abdullah
- Alistair Petrie as Major Rod Gilchrist

== Production ==
The film was produced by Red Production Company. Principal photography began in June 2006, with the Iraq scenes being filmed in Tunisia. Marchant said that the film was inspired by a number of real-life incidents, including one where a soldier from the Royal Regiment of Fusiliers took trophy photographs of Iraqi men being tied to a forklift among other abuse and then tried to have the film roll developed. (Note: The photographs were taken by Corporal Gary Bartlam, who was sentenced to eighteen months in a youth detention centre. Three other Fusiliers were convicted; Lance Corporal Mark Cooley was jailed for two years, Corporal Daniel Kenyon was jailed for eighteen months and Lance Corporal Darren Larkin was jailed for 140 days. All four Fusiliers were also discharged in disgrace.) The producers undertook "extensive research", including several interviews with soldiers and their families.

== Broadcast ==
The Mark of Cain was originally scheduled for broadcast on Channel 4 in January 2007 but this was rescheduled to 5 April 2007 due to the then-ongoing court martial over the killing of Baha Mousa. The broadcast was then rescheduled again to 17 May 2007 over concerns the film could influence Iran's treatment of captured Royal Navy personnel, before finally airing on 12 April 2007.

== Reception ==
=== Critical response ===
- Good early reviews from variety.com.
- Won a BAFTA 2008 April 2008
- US Premiere at the Red Rock Film Festival 15 November 2008

=== Awards and nominations ===
- Amnesty International's Movies That Matter award at International Film Festival Rotterdam
- Southbank Show award for best TV drama of 2007
- BAFTA TV Award for Best Single Drama 2008

== See also ==
- Death of Baha Mousa
