= A Measure of Wealth =

A Measure Of Wealth

Studio album by The Law
- Released: 28 September 2009
- Recorded: 2008–2009
- Genre: Indie rock
- Label: Local Boy Records
- Producer: Stan Kybert

The Law chronology
A Measure Of Wealth (2009)	Trigger (2012)

Singles from A Measure of Wealth
- 1. "Don't Stop, Believe" Released: 20 July 2009; 2. "The Chase" Released: 14 September 2009

Professional ratings
Review scores
Source	Rating
NME	4/10

A Measure Of Wealth is the debut studio album by Scottish indie rock band The Law, released on 28 September 2009 on Local Boy Records. The album also includes two early singles "Milk & Honey" and "Still Got Friday To Go".

== Track listing ==
All tracks are written by Stevie Anderson, except where noted

No.	Title	Writer(s)	Length
1.	"Don't Stop, Believe"	Anderson, Donald, Purvey	3:20
2.	"The Chase"		5:15
3.	"Local Boy Lost"		3:00
4.	"Man In The Moon"		3:55
5.	"Television Satellite"		3:12
6.	"Still Got Friday To Go"	Anderson, Purvey	4:51
7.	"Strings (For You and Me)"		3:18
8.	"Milk & Honey"		3:14
9.	"Vertical Feeling"		3:24
10.	"City Boys, City Girls"	Anderson, Donald	3:41
11.	"Congratulations"		2:44

== Personnel ==
- Stuart Purvey – vocals
- Stevie Anderson – guitar
- Simon Donald – bass
- Martin Donald – drums
