= Holy Ghost Revival =

American rock band

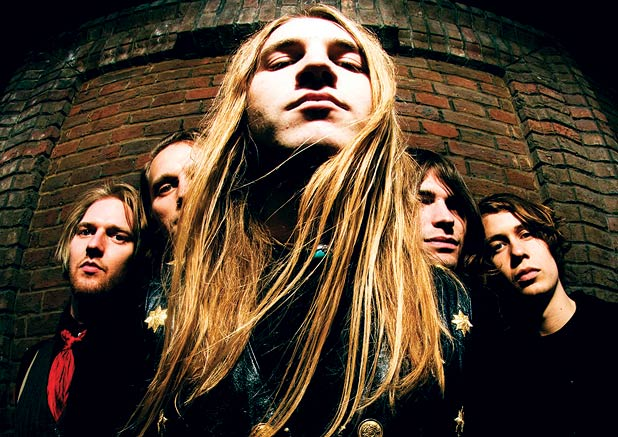

Background information
- Origin: Bainbridge Island, Washington, United States
- Genres: Glam rock, heavy metal, folk rock
- Years active: 2001-2008
- Labels: 1965 Records, Burn Burn Burn Records, Antarctic Records, Sycophanticide, Jonny Cat, 17 Television
- Past members: Conor St. Kiley, Mikko Freeman, Sterling MacKinnon, Chad Dahlquist, Jeremy Young, Zack Lewis, Morgan Stickrod, TV Coahran, Andy Crane, Paul Phillip Brinkley, Vanessa Gonzalez, Jean-Paul Garnier, Sebastian Sheldon, Johnny O'Donnell, Jakes
- Website: Holy Ghost Revival on MySpace

Holy Ghost Revival was an American rock band formed in 2001 in Bainbridge Island, Washington. Self-described as "heavy metal/folk rock/pagan glam," the band had a rotating lineup of musicians. Before disbanding in 2008, the line-up included Conor Kiley (vocals, keyboard), Mikko Freeman (drums), Sebastian Sheldon (keyboard, guitar), Jakes (bass), and Johnny O'Donnell (guitar). They released a number of LPs and singles on labels such as 1965 Records.

The band drew on film soundtracks and 1970s and 1980s rock, and according to OC Weekly, "the Holy Ghost's vampy, swaggering power-chords-and-pianos set their glammy theatrics to operatic punk rock melodrama." Frontman Conor Kiley was described by Allmusic as "an unholy cross between Iggy Pop, Axl Rose, and Jim Morrison."

== History ==
=== Founding ===
The metal band Holy Ghost Revival was founded on Bainbridge Island, Washington state in 2001. The band started when most of the members were still in high school. According to frontman Conor Kiley, who graduated Bainbridge High School in 2001, "We were just high school kids that played punk rock music, glam rock and other groovy sounds. We just got together and started doing it." The name Holy Ghost Revival was taken from a shop sign in Seattle called The Blade, and the band got a van and began booking their own shows. Self-described as "heavy metal folk rock/pagan glam," the band has had a shifting lineup. On Bainbridge Island, the band "served as mentors to the [local glam band] Gruff Mummies."

=== Releases ===
Early on the band released several singles and offered free 7" vinyl records to fans. They released City Drugs in 2005 as a vinyl LP on Antarctic Records.

Bleeding Light

Their debut album Bleeding Light was released in 2005 as a split release on the labels Jonny Cat and 17 Television, with Seattle musician Jherek Bischoff as a guest on strings. According to a positive review by CMJ, "As complex as Bleeding can get, the band is still basically a scroungy bunch that usually plays with scuzz-punk bands. The driving drums faithfully expose the blood and guts inside the goth body." Also in 2005, the band released the live album Live on Sycophanticide. The musicians featured on this album were Conor Kiley (vocals), Sterling MacKinnon (bass), Andy Crane (keyboard), TV Coahran (guitar), and Mikko Freeman (drums).

1965 Records releases

Holy Ghost Revival signed with the London-based 1965 Records in 2007. Initially the label re-released the band's debut album Bleeding Light, and also in 2007 the band had two tracks included on the 1965 Records compilation Decline Of The Pacific Northwest - Seattle Rock N Roll Circa 2007. Released on 7" vinyl, the tracks featured Conor Kiley (vocals, keyboard), Mikko Freeman (drums), Jean-Paul Garnier (bass, clarinet, vocals), Sebastian Sheldon (keyboard, guitar), and Johnny O'Donnell (guitar).

Before February 2008 the band had toured Europe, and as of June 2008, had already completed several tours of the West coast and two tours of the United States. Later that month, they embarked on a larger tour supporting an album for the first time. Their single "Hot Love in a Berlin Bombshelter" was released in July 2008 on Burn Burn Burn Records, on 12" vinyl.

Twilight Exit (2008)

Twilight Exit is a lot more heavy metal. It's hard rock, 70's sort of stuff. In the past we were mostly glam rock but we’re all from Seattle where there's a lot of bad indie rock which is just boring for us. Then just looking at the States as a whole...there's not really a lot of music that reflects the fucked up situation that we’re in. We’re not really political it's just that you can't help but be affected by it, so I think [our music is] a more immediate response that fits how we all feel right now."
— Frontman Conor Kiley

Later in 2008 the band moved into a Vauxhall-based council flat in London. There they worked on their sophomore album, which was produced by Ryan Hadlock (Modest Mouse). Twilight Exit, was released on September 1, 2008, again on 1965 Records. The album was inspired by horror film soundtracks.

NME gave Twilight Exit a score of 7/10, drawing connections to 1970s and 1980s rock bands such as Guns N' Roses and Jethro Tull, and stating "While on one side of Seattle Fleet Foxes are creating succulent Americana that smells of dew-flecked pine trees and freshly laundered plaid shirts, Holy Ghost Revival are on the other lobbing out star-spangled pop that, by the looks of them, you’d expect to reek of vomit, spontaneous street violence and pushing over grannies." About the sound, "Live, it’s a cacophony of sound, a fever that you can’t sweat out and a racket that your mum certainly would not approve of, but on record it’s contained, elegant retro-rock that mother might just give a spin."

=== Post dissolution ===
The band members split paths after the release of Twilight Exit and associated tour. Stated Kiley in 2010, the experience was "A lot of mayhem, ecstatic highs and dark, grisly lows. We ended up getting to do a bunch of awesome recordings, tour the world and somehow get on a major label and walk away unscathed. We called it a day at the right time."

By 2010, Kiley was performing with the group Broken Nobles, and since has been releasing music under the name Bad Blood.

== Style ==
The Seattle Weekly called the band "a Seattle wild card who crash Victoriana whimsy into metal anthems." About the band's message, Kiley has stated, "I guess it has no redeeming social value like any good rock n’ roll music. It's fuelled by apathy and hatred and all of the things teenagers have right now which is basically nothing." James Monger of Allmusic called frontman Kiley "an unholy cross between Iggy Pop, Axl Rose, and Jim Morrison."

The band cites The Scorpions and The Doors as influences, as well as Diamond Dogs, David Bowie, Blue Öyster Cult, and movie soundtracks. They specifically cite Stanley Kubrick's films an influence, and many of their songs are ostensibly written for film. According to OC Weekly, "the Holy Ghost's vampy, swaggering power-chords-and-pianos set—their glammy theatrics and operatic punk rock melodrama—are easy to cast: Theda Barra meets Marc Bolan meets Robert Smith. [Music critic] Richard Meltzer consulted on the script."

== Members ==
Past primary members

- Conor Kiley - Vocals, Keyboard, Guitar
- Mikko Freeman - Drums
- Sterling MacKinnon - Bass
- TV Coahran - Guitar
- Andy Crane - Keyboard
- Paul Phillip Brinkley - Guitar
- Jean-Paul Garrnier - Bass and Clarinet
- Sebastian Sheldon -Keyboard and Guitar
- Johnny O'Donnell - Guitar
- Jakes Bayley - Bass
- Jeremy Young - Drums
- Chad Dahlquist - Keyboard
- Vanessa Gonzalez - Keyboard
- Morgan Stickrod - Guitar
- Zack Lewis - Guitar

Past guest artists

- Jherek Bischoff - Strings

== Discography ==
=== Albums ===
List of live and studio albums by Holy Ghost Revival
Year	Album title	Release details
2005	City Drugs	Released: 2005; Label: Antarctic Records; Format: Vinyl LP
2005	Bleeding Light	Released: 2005 / May 7, 2007; Label: Jonny Cat, 1965 Records; Format: CD
2005	Live	Released: 2005; Label: Sycophanticide; Format: CD
2008	Twilight Exit	Released: Sep 1, 2008; Label: 1965 Records; Format: CD, LP

=== Singles ===
List of singles by Holy Ghost Revival
Year	Album title	Release details
	"Christmas Everyday"	Label: 1965 Records; Format: 7" vinyl
2003	"Hot Love in a Berlin Bombshelter"	Released: 2003/July 29, 2008; Label: Burn Burn Burn Records; Format: 12" vinyl
2007	"Embrace The Hate"	Released: 2007; Label: 1965 Records (#44); Format: 7" vinyl, promo CD

=== Compilations ===
- 2006: NME Presents - Independent Thinking (1965 Records) - track "Christmas Everyday"
- 2007: Decline Of The Pacific Northwest - Seattle Rock N Roll Circa 2007 (1965 Records) - tracks "Girl's Night Out" and "Angel Of Death Of My Dreams Part 2"
- 2007: Ponies In A Stable (Don't Stop Believin' Records) - track "Lay Me Down"
- 2009: GGNZLA Sampler (GGNZLA) - track "It's Ok To Be Gay"

== See also ==
- Glam rock
