= Same Jeans =

2007 single by the View

Single by the View

from the album Hats Off to the Buskers
- B-side: "Cherry Girl"; "Superstar Tradesman" (live); "Screamin' n Shoutin'"
- Released: 15 January 2007
- Length: 3:32
- Label: 1965
- Songwriters: Kyle Falconer; Kieren Webster
- Producer: Owen Morris

The View singles chronology
"Superstar Tradesman" (2006)	"Same Jeans" (2007)	"The Don" / "Skag Trendy" (2007)

"Same Jeans" is the third single by Dundee band the View, appearing on their debut album, Hats Off to the Buskers (2007). It was Radio 1's Jo Whiley's record of the week commencing 27 November 2006 and was released on 15 January 2007. It followed the singles "Wasted Little DJs" and "Superstar Tradesman" and was the third and final release before the album on 22 January 2007.

The song received significantly more airplay than the previous singles, and it was the first single by the band to enter the BBC Radio 2 playlist as well as the first single to be A-listed by BBC Radio 1. It entered the UK Singles Chart at number 11 on downloads alone before rising to number three the following week. It also topped the Scottish Singles Chart the same week, becoming the band's second number one on that chart after "Wasted Little DJs". It became the band's third UK top-20 single and their first and only top-10 hit. The song also charted in Ireland, reaching number 24 on the Irish Singles Chart.

== Track listings ==
- UK CD single
1. "Same Jeans"
2. "Cherry Girl"
3. "Superstar Tradesman" (live from the Barfly, Glasgow—MTV2Gonzo Tour)
4. "Same Jeans" (video)
5. "Superstar Tradesman" (live from the Barfly, Glasgow—MTV2Gonzo Tour video)
- UK 7-inch single

A. "Same Jeans"
B. "Screamin' n Shoutin'"

- Australian CD single
1. "Same Jeans"
2. "Wasted Little DJs"
3. "Cherry Girl"
4. "Same Jeans" (video)

== Charts ==
=== Weekly charts ===
Chart (2007)	Peak position
Australia (AMR)	100
Europe (Eurochart Hot 100)	14
Ireland (IRMA)	24
Scottish Singles Sales (Official Charts)	1
UK Singles (Official Charts)	3

=== Year-end charts ===
Chart (2007)	Position
UK Singles (OCC)	48

== Certifications ==
Region	Certification	Certified units/sales
United Kingdom (BPI)	Platinum	600,000^{‡}
^{‡} Sales+streaming figures based on certification alone.
