= Superstar Tradesman =

Single by The View

from the album Hats Off to the Buskers
- Released: 23 October 2006
- Genre: Indie rock
- Length: 3:13
- Label: 1965 Records
- Songwriter(s): Kyle Falconer, Kieren Webster

The View singles chronology
"Wasted Little DJs" (2006)	"Superstar Tradesman" (2006)	"Same Jeans" (2007)

"Superstar Tradesman" is the second single by Dundee band The View with the B-Side being "Up The Junction (Zane Lowe Sessions)". It was Radio 1's Edith Bowman's record of the week commencing 4 September 2006 and entered the Radio 1 daytime playlist on 6 September 2006. The single entered the MTV/NME video chart at Number 2 on 24 September 2006. On 8 October 2006, Superstar Tradesman topped the MTV/NME video chart.

After charting the previous week on downloads at #60, It entered the UK top 40 at #15 on 29 October 2006, and in the week of release the band gave an interview to STV to discuss the song and their thoughts on the forthcoming album. Despite equalling the chart position of the previous single "Wasted Little DJs" it spent just one week in the top 40.

The song is also well known for being featured as introduction music on The Friday Night Project since early 2007.

'The Ferry' mentioned in the song's chorus is in reference to Broughty Ferry, a seaside town in Dundee.

== Charts ==
Chart (2009)	Peak position
UK Singles (OCC)	15

== Track listing ==
- UK CD
1. "Superstar Tradesman" – 3:18
2. "Up The Junction (Zane Lowe Sessions)" – 2:33
3. "Wasted Little DJs (Live at Abertay)" – 3:58
4. "Superstar Tradesman (Video)"
- UK 7"
1. "Superstar Tradesman" – 3:18
2. "Up The Junction (Zane Lowe Sessions)" – 2:33
