= The View EP =

EP by The View
- Released: February–March 2006
- Genre: Indie rock
- Label: Two Thumbs (TTEP001)
- Producer: Robin Wynn-Evans; Grant Dickson

The View chronology
The View EP (2006)	Hats Off to the Buskers (2007)

The View EP is a self-titled EP by the View, released in March 2006. It is the first official release by the band. The EP was pressed by Dundee label Two Thumbs, and was limited to just 2000 copies. It was made available to the public through the band's on-line forums, and sold out within a matter of weeks. Due to the CD having no official distribution, the exact release date of the EP is unknown. In an interview with The Courier on 20 January 2006, Grant Dickson (of Two Thumbs) stated that "The View EP will be out sometime near the end of next month". Copies of the EP were first made available through Two Thumbs' forum on 15 March 2006.

Three tracks from the EP, "Comin Down", "Street Lights" and "Face for the Radio", would later appear on the band's debut album, Hats Off to the Buskers. The latter would be released as a single on 25 June 2007. The song reached No. 69 on the UK Singles Chart on 7 July 2007.

== Track listing ==
1. "Comin Down"
2. "Street Lights"
3. "Screamin' n Shoutin'"
4. "Face for the Radio"
