= The Law (Scottish band) =

Scottish indie rock band

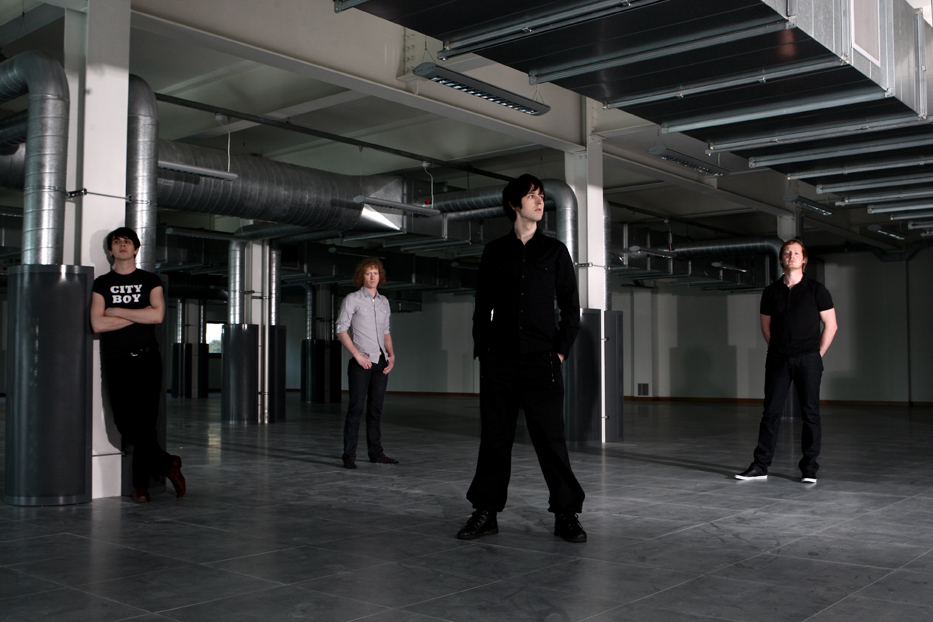
- The Law

Background information
- Origin: Dundee, Scotland
- Genres: Indie rock
- Years active: 1997–2017
- Labels: Local Boy Records (distributed by Universal via Absolute)
- Members: Stuart Purvey; Stevie Anderson; Simon Donald; Martin Donald

The Law were a Scottish indie rock band from Dundee, Scotland. Their debut album A Measure of Wealth was released in September 2009 through their own record label Local Boy Records (distributed by Universal via Absolute). The first single to precede the album, "Don't Stop, Believe", was released on 20 July 2009. The second single to precede the album, "The Chase" was released on 14 September 2009. They split in 2017.

== Biography ==
The Law consists of Stuart Purvey (vocals), Stevie Anderson (guitar), and brothers Martin Donald (drums), and Simon Donald (bass).

Early recording sessions produced promising results and a couple of indie single releases in 2007 - "Milk & Honey" and "Still Got Friday To Go" - which saw The Law breach the official UK Indie Chart. This gained them initial recognition with the media, seeing them featured in national music press such as NME, and receiving national airplay on the likes of BBC Radio 1 and the XFM network. The year ended on a high when the band picked up a Tartan Clef Music Award for 'XFM best breakthrough act'.

The Law spent the majority of 2008 writing, recording, mixing, and mastering songs for their debut album. The mainstay of the process were the sessions at Sawmills Studios in Cornwall with producer Stan Kybert

Their debut album, A Measure of Wealth, was released on 28 September 2009 through the band's own imprint Local Boy Records (a subsidiary of Universal via Absolute).

The first single to be taken from the album - "Don’t Stop, Believe" – was released on 20 July 2009, receiving airplay from BBC Radio 1, BBC 6 Music, and XFM. This single was initially a b-side on The Law's previous single, "Still Got Friday To Go".

The second single, "The Chase" was released on 14 September, prior to the release of their debut album, A Measure of Wealth.

The Law have been prolific live headline performers in their native Scotland, and several support slots with fellow Dundonians The View on their UK tours have introduced the band to a wider audience, as have appearances with the likes of Air Traffic and The Rascals.

T in the Park, Scotland's biggest music festival, in 2009 was a historic point for The Law. Initially booked to play on the BBC Introducing Stage on the Saturday of the weekend, a cancelled appearance by New Zealand artist Ladyhawke saw the band invited back to play the Futures Stage on the Sunday, making them one of a handful of acts to perform more than once over the weekend.

The band's song "Don't Stop, Believe" features on the trailer for the 2009 movie The Men Who Stare at Goats starring George Clooney and fellow Scot Ewan McGregor and in 2010, The Law were granted funding by the Scottish Arts Council to showcase at the South By Southwest festival in Austin, Texas, United States.

The Law released their second album Trigger on 6 February 2012.

== Discography ==
=== Albums ===
- A Measure of Wealth (2009)
- Trigger (2012)

=== Singles ===
- "Milk & Honey" (2007)
- "Still Got Friday To Go" (2007) No. 5 UK Indie
- "Don't Stop, Believe" (2009)
- "The Chase" (2009)
- "Holiday" (2012)
