= Cutting Corners =

Cutting Corners may refer to:

- Cutting Corners (EP), a 2013 EP by The View
- Cutting Corners (album), a 1982 album by Secret Service
- "Cutting Corners" (Ben 10), a 2017 television episode
- "Cutting Corners" (Mayday), a 2003 television episode
