= Cheeky for a Reason =

Studio album by the View
- Released: 9 July 2012
- Recorded: 2011–2012
- Studios: Motor Museum, Liverpool
- Genres: Indie rock; power pop
- Label: Cooking Vinyl
- Producer: Mike Crossey

The View chronology
Bread and Circuses (2011)	Cheeky for a Reason (2012)	Ropewalk (2015)

Singles from Cheeky for a Reason
- 1. "How Long" Released: 6 June 2012; 2. "The Clock" Released: 16 September 2012; 3. "Tacky Tattoo" / "Hold on Now" Released: 2 December 2012

Cheeky For a Reason is the fourth studio album by Scottish rock band the View, released on 9 July 2012. The album was promoted in Britain with a 21-date tour.

== Singles ==
"How Long" was the first single to be released from the album and was made available for download on 6 June 2012.

== Reception ==
Reviews of the album were mixed scoring an average 5.3/10 in music review aggregator AnyDecentMusic?. NME awarded Cheeky For a Reason 7 out of 10, commenting "Ear-wormy choruses, breezy melodies and a touch early Libs – the boys from Dundee are close to their best."

Paul Mardles of The Observer gave the album 3 out of 5 stars stating; "You have to admire the chutzpah of the View, whose fourth album has been described by the group's singer, Kyle Falconer, as 'Fleetwood Mac's Rumours done by the Clash'. In truth, not unlike its three predecessors, Cheeky for a Reason is unadorned lad-rock, its terrace-friendly singalongs pitched between Slade and the Libertines stripped of the self-mythology. Still, lyrically, there are signs of tenderness, notably on the frothy 'How Long', while the gorgeous final track, 'Tacky Tattoo', suggests the Dundee boys will one day pursue a brand of rock more sophisticated than their present skinny-trousered fare".

== Track listing ==
1. "How Long" - 2:54
2. "AB (We Need Treatment)" - 3:08
3. "Hold on Now" - 4:25
4. "Anfield Row" - 3:45
5. "Bullet" - 3:04
6. "Bunker (Solid Ground)" - 3:40
7. "The Clock" - 4:38
8. "Piano Interlude" - 0:11
9. "Hole in the Bed" - 3:45
10. "Sour Little Sweetie" - 3:41
11. "Lean on My World" - 3:36
12. "Tacky Tattoo" - 4:35
13. "Reaction (iTunes Exclusive)" - 3:33
14. "Some Kind of Peace of Mind (iTunes Exclusive)" - 3:37

== Charts ==
Chart (2012)	Peak position
UK Albums Chart	9
UK Independent Albums Chart	1
