= Hats Off to the Buskers =

Studio album by the View
- Released: 22 January 2007
- Recorded: 2006
- Genre: Indie rock; indie pop; garage rock
- Length: 40:45
- Label: 1965
- Producer: The View; Owen Morris

The View chronology
| The View EP (2006) | Hats Off to the Buskers (2007) | Which Bitch? (2009) |

Singles from Hats Off to the Buskers
- 1. "Wasted Little DJs" Released: 8 August 2006; 2. "Superstar Tradesman" Released: 23 October 2006; 3. "Same Jeans" Released: 15 January 2007; 4. "The Don / Skag Trendy" Released: 23 April 2007; 5. "Face for the Radio" Released: 25 June 2007

Hats Off to the Buskers is the debut album by Scottish band the View. It was released on 22 January 2007 on 1965 Records. It was reported on the band's official forum that the album had leaked to various internet sites in mid December 2006. The album entered the UK Albums Chart at No. 1 on 28 January 2007. The album charted at No. 45 on the UK end-of-year album chart, after selling around 319,000 copies in 2007. The album has been certified platinum. It was nominated for the 2007 Mercury Prize.

The song "Wasteland" is also the background music for the Nike "Show Us Your 5" advertisement.

== Reception ==
Professional ratings
Review scores
| Source | Rating |
|---|---|
| AllMusic | 3/5 stars |
| Gigwise | 4.5/5 stars |
| NME | (8/10) |
| Sunday Times | 4/5 stars |
| The Times | 3/5 stars |
| Pitchfork | (6.2/10) |

Initial critical response to Hats Off to the Buskers was positive. At Metacritic, which assigns a normalized rating out of 100 to reviews from mainstream critics, the album has received an average score of 75, based on 17 reviews.

== Track listing ==
All songs written by Kyle Falconer and Kieren Webster.

1. "Comin' Down" – 2:57
2. "Superstar Tradesman" – 3:13
3. "Same Jeans" – 3:33
4. "Don't Tell Me" – 3:22
5. "Skag Trendy" – 3:00
6. "The Don" – 3:09
7. "Face for the Radio" – 3:18
8. "Wasted Little DJs" – 3:57
9. "Gran's for Tea" – 2:33
10. "Dance into the Night" – 3:05
11. "Claudia" – 2:40
12. "Street Lights" – 2:57
13. "Wasteland" – 2:26
14. "Typical Time" – 0:35

US release w/ bonus tracks:

1. "Posh Boys"
2. "Skag Trendy" (live at Abertay University, Dundee)
3. "Same Jeans" (live at the Astoria, London)

== Personnel ==
- Kyle Falconer – vocals, guitar, piano
- Kieren Webster – vocals, bass
- Pete Reilly – lead guitar
- Steven Morrison – drums

== Charts ==
=== Weekly charts ===
| Chart (2007) | Peak position |
|---|---|
| German Albums (Offizielle Top 100) | 89 |
| Irish Albums (IRMA) | 3 |
| Scottish Albums (OCC) | 1 |
| UK Albums (OCC) | 1 |

=== Year-end charts ===
| Chart (2007) | Position |
|---|---|
| UK Albums (OCC) | 45 |
