= Bread and Circuses (The View album) =

Studio album by the View
- Released: 14 March 2011
- Genre: Indie rock, garage rock
- Label: 1965
- Producer: Youth

The View chronology
Which Bitch? (2009)	Bread and Circuses (2011)	Cheeky for a Reason (2012)

Singles from Bread and Circuses
- 1. "Sunday" Released: 1 November 2010; 2. "Grace" Released: 14 March 2011

Bread and Circuses is the third studio album by the View. It was recorded with producer Youth in 2010. In late 2010, the band went on an expansive tour of the UK in support of the album.

== Track listing ==
All songs written by Kyle Falconer and Kieren Webster, expect ‘Friend’ by Kyle Falconer, Kieren Webster and Darren Rennie

1. "Grace"
2. "Underneath The Lights"
3. "Tragic Magic"
4. "Girl"
5. "Life"
6. "Friend"
7. "Beautiful"
8. "Blondie"
9. "Sunday"
10. "Walls"
11. "Happy"
12. "Best Lasts Forever"
13. "Witches"

== Reception ==
Reviews of Bread and Circuses were mixed. It entered the UK Album Charts at #14. First single "Sunday" was released as a free download in November 2010 and second single "Grace" was released one week before the album in March 2011, with the previously unreleased B-side "Clowns". "Grace" was inspired by guitarist Pete Reilly's downstairs neighbour and their noise complaints against him. The single failed to chart inside the UK top 100.

== Chart performance ==
Chart	Providers	Peak
The Official UK Album Chart	BPI / The Official UK Charts Company	14
The Official Scottish Album Chart	BPI / The Official UK Charts Company	2
