= Wasted Little DJs =

2006 single by the View

Single by the View

from the album Hats Off to the Buskers
- B-side: "Posh Boys"; "Comin' Down" (live)
- Released: 7 August 2006
- Genre: Indie rock
- Length: 3:57
- Label: 1965
- Songwriters: Kyle Falconer; Kieren Webster
- Producer: Owen Morris

The View singles chronology
"Wasted Little DJs" (2006)	"Superstar Tradesman" (2006)

"Wasted Little DJs" is a song Dundee indie band the View. Serving as their debut single, it was issued as the lead single from their first album, Hats Off to the Buskers (2007). Before its physical release on 7 August 2006, the single had reached number 73 on the UK Singles Chart on downloads only before climbing up to number 15 the following week. It spent two more weeks in the UK top 40 before dropping out altogether. In the band's native Scotland, the song reached number one on the Scottish Singles Chart.

The song was placed at number nine on NME's list of the top 50 singles of 2006. and went on to later win the public vote for Best Track at the NME Awards 2007. On the artwork for the single the title was given as "Wasted Little DJ's", which is grammatically incorrect; however, by the time the album was released, the mistaken apostrophe had been dropped and the track was listed as "Wasted Little DJs" by the label.

== Track listings ==
- UK CD single
1. "Wasted Little DJ's"
2. "Posh Boys"
3. "Comin' Down" (live)
4. "Wasted Little DJ's" (video)
- UK 7-inch single
1. "Wasted Little DJ's"
2. "Posh Boys"

== Charts ==
Chart (2006)	Peak position
Scottish Singles Sales (Official Charts)	1
UK Singles (Official Charts)	15
