= 1965 Records =

Subsidiary record label of Sony BMG

- Parent company: PIAS Recordings
- Founded: 2006, relaunched = 2015
- Founder: James Endeacott (Managing director)
- Genre: Various
- Country of origin: United Kingdom
- Location: London

1965 Records is a London-based record label formed in 2006, initially as subsidiary of Sony BMG/Columbia, but currently of the PIAS Group. The label was founded by James Endeacott (formerly of Rough Trade Records), who first signed The Libertines. The label features bands who are primarily indie rock/pop, and are best known for signing Dundee based four-piece The View.

== History ==
1965 Records took their name from the year of Endeacott's birth, as well as his favourite year for music. Originating in May 2006, the company initially releasing five separate limited edition 7-inch vinyl singles by Jack Afro, Billie the Vision & the Dancers, Pizzy Yelliot, The Book of Lists and Jahcoozi in the first three months of its creation between May and July. The label's first album distribution, Cannery Hours by The Occasion, came on 17 July 2006. The label followed this with the release of "Wasted Little DJs" by The View on 7 August 2006. This single was the first charting single associated with the label, reaching #15 in the UK Singles Chart.

=== NME Presents: Independent Thinking ===
On 11 November 2006, 1965 Records were given their first push into the public eye. Music publication NME released a covermount CD with the magazine, titled "NME Presents: Independent Thinking". It contained a number of unreleased tracks by bands signed to the label, such as The Law, The Draytones and Ripchord. The CD was headed by The View, who contributed with a rare live version of "Screamin' n Shoutin'" at Abertay University.

=== Commercial success ===
1965 Records gained their first major chart hit with the release of The View's "Same Jeans", which peaked at #3 in the UK Singles Chart on 22 January 2007. One week later, the band would also give the label their first number one album with their debut album Hats Off to the Buskers on 29 January 2007.

Throughout 16–27 May 2007, 1965 Records took part in a joint tour with fellow record label Deltasonic named "The Sonic65 Tour". The tour featured Deltasonic artist Candie Payne and 1965 band The Draytones playing in a number of locations across the UK, including King Tut's Wah Wah Hut in Glasgow as well as the 100 Club in London.

=== Relaunch ===
Around 2011, Sony BMG / Columbia shut the label down for commercial reasons.

1965 Records was re-launched in 2015: "thanks to a slightly boozy agreement concocted with [PIAS]’s Jason Rackham, 1965 is back, fully independent, with Endeacott once more at the helm."

== Artists (previously) signed to 1965 Records ==
- Lusts
- Dave McCabe & The Ramifications
- Man & the Echo
- Black Peaches
- Coves
- Wesley Fuller
- Sink Ya Teeth
- Nadine Shah
- The Clay
- Derek Meins (formerly of Eastern Lane)
- The Draytones
- Holy Ghost Revival
- The Hugs
- Larry Jon Wilson
- The Metros
- The Monks Kitchen
- Motion Pictures
- The Occasion
- Ripchord
- Toddla T
- Twelves Trio
- The View

== See also ==
- List of record labels
