= The View (band) =

Scottish indie rock band

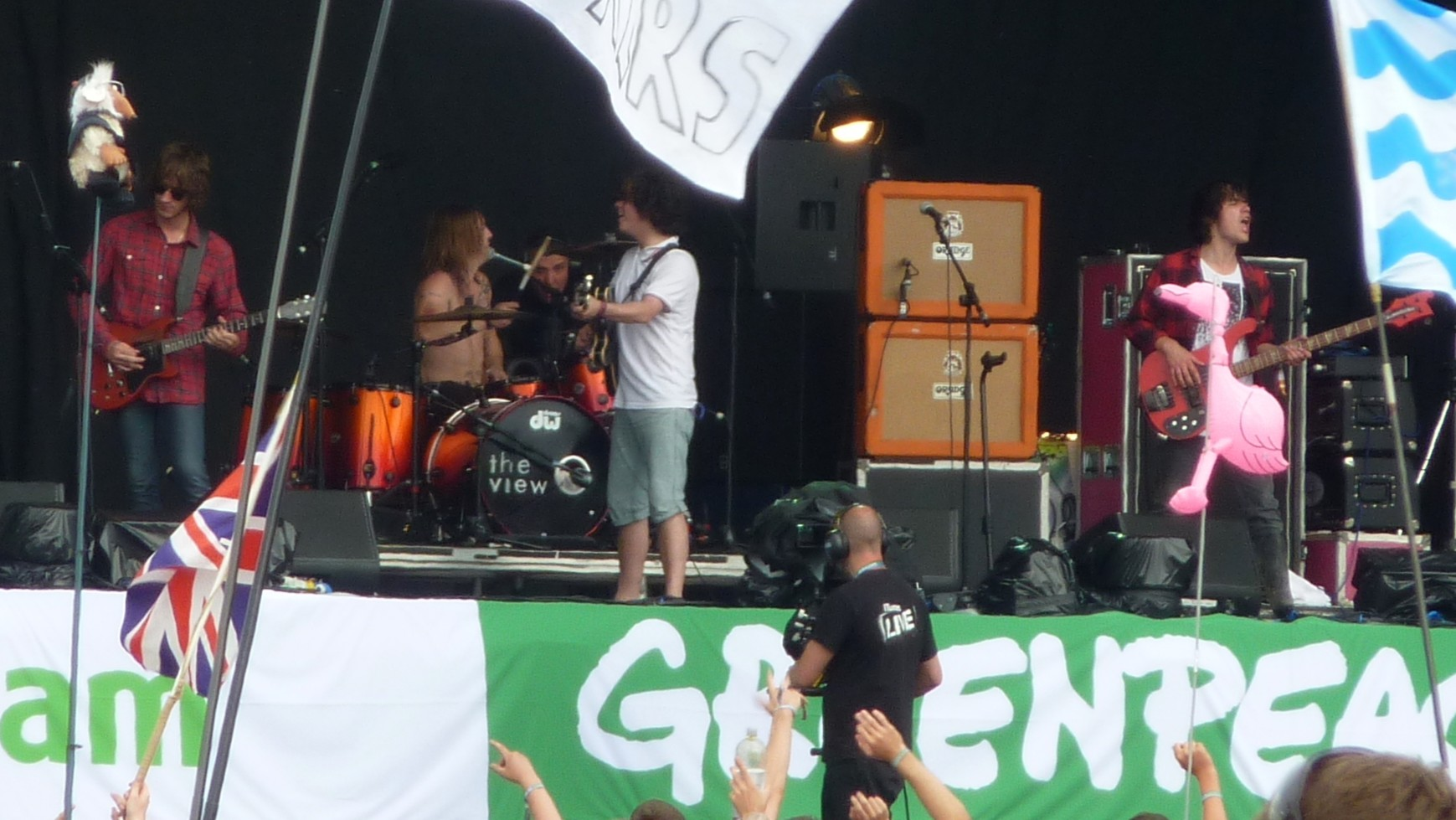
- The View performing at Glastonbury Festival 2009; L to R: Pete Reilly, Steven Morrison, Kyle Falconer, Kieren Webster

Background information
- Origin: Dundee, Scotland
- Genres: Indie rock; folk punk; power pop; celtic rock
- Years active: 2005–2017, 2022–present
- Labels: 1965 Records (Sony BMG/Columbia), Two Thumbs
- Members: Kyle Falconer; Kieren Webster; Pete Reilly
- Past members: Steven Morrison
- Website: theviewofficial.com

The View are a Scottish indie rock band that formed in Dundee in 2005. They incorporate various styles such as punk, pop, alternative rock, and folk in their music. They are best known for their 2007 single "Same Jeans" which reached number 3 on the UK Singles Chart.

The band have released five studio albums since their platinum selling debut Hats Off to the Buskers, which topped the UK Albums Chart in January 2007 and was nominated for the 2007 Mercury Music Prize.

Despite never matching this early success, they enjoy a large fanbase in their native Scotland with albums regularly topping the Scottish Albums Chart. The band also hold a reputation for their live performances with regularly sold-out tours in Scotland. The View are also regular fixtures at music festivals throughout the UK; they played at Scotland's largest festival—T in the Park—a record eight times, with organiser Geoff Ellis saying, "The View can play every year under my watch, if they want to."

== History ==
=== Formation and early touring (2005–2006) ===
The View initially formed around a cover band at school, playing their own versions of bands such as Squeeze and the Sex Pistols. Lead singer Kyle Falconer, guitarist Peter Reilly, bassist Kieren Webster and original drummer Michael Annable all attended St John's RC High School, They began by performing a number of their own songs and cover versions at school talent contests. The deputy head teacher of St John's stated that he knew the band would go far and he told them to push for a record deal. The View entered the school talent contest four times but were only successful twice. Following this, the band set up base to write their own material in a back room of The Bayview Pub, a bar owned by Falconer's cousin. They progressed to play more cover gigs and weddings around the Dundee area, including the Centenary Bar in Central Dundee and a caravan park in Arbroath. The band were later ejected from their base in The Bayview, following singer Kyle Falconer reportedly riding a scooter along the bar.

The band continued to tour small venues around their hometown, and after their second billed gig at The Doghouse, they were signed to local independent Dundee record label Two Thumbs, and released the self-titled The View EP in early 2006. Alongside the EP (released via the independent Two Thumbs label), the band recorded early demo sessions at T-Pot studios in Perthshire; these sessions would eventually yield the tracks that formed their debut album, Hats Off to the Buskers.

During this period the band came to the attention of BBC Radio 1 presenters Zane Lowe, Edith Bowman and Jo Whiley as well as BBC Radio 2 presenter Dermot O'Leary who gave them airplay nine months before the album hit number one. The band's live performance of "Wasted Little DJs" (later to be their first single) featured on Zane's show of 8 February 2006; alongside established acts The Kooks and Be Your Own Pet. Soon after, tracks from the debut EP began to be played on Radio 1 and other local and national stations. In particular, Jim Gellatly, at Xfm Scotland, featured the band heavily on X-Posure Scotland, his new music show. A live acoustic session was recorded for the show broadcast 3 May 2006.

On 26 and 27 August 2006, the View were a last-minute addition to the Reading and Leeds Festivals. The NME reported the fans' chant of "The View, the View are on fire" could be heard ringing loudly around the packed tent. They also played both festivals in 2007.

In mid-2006 the band began a UK wide headline tour. During this tour the band played their first headline show in Scotland at the Liquid Room on 1 September 2006, they then went on to play dates with other major acts and feature in the MTV2 Gonzo tour. Documenting this, a half-hour-long special On Tour With The View was broadcast on MTV2 on 18 November 2006. In December 2006, the band played gigs in Tokyo, Japan and made their first trip to the United States, in January 2007, playing dates in New York City, San Francisco and Los Angeles.

=== Hats Off to the Buskers (2006–2008) ===
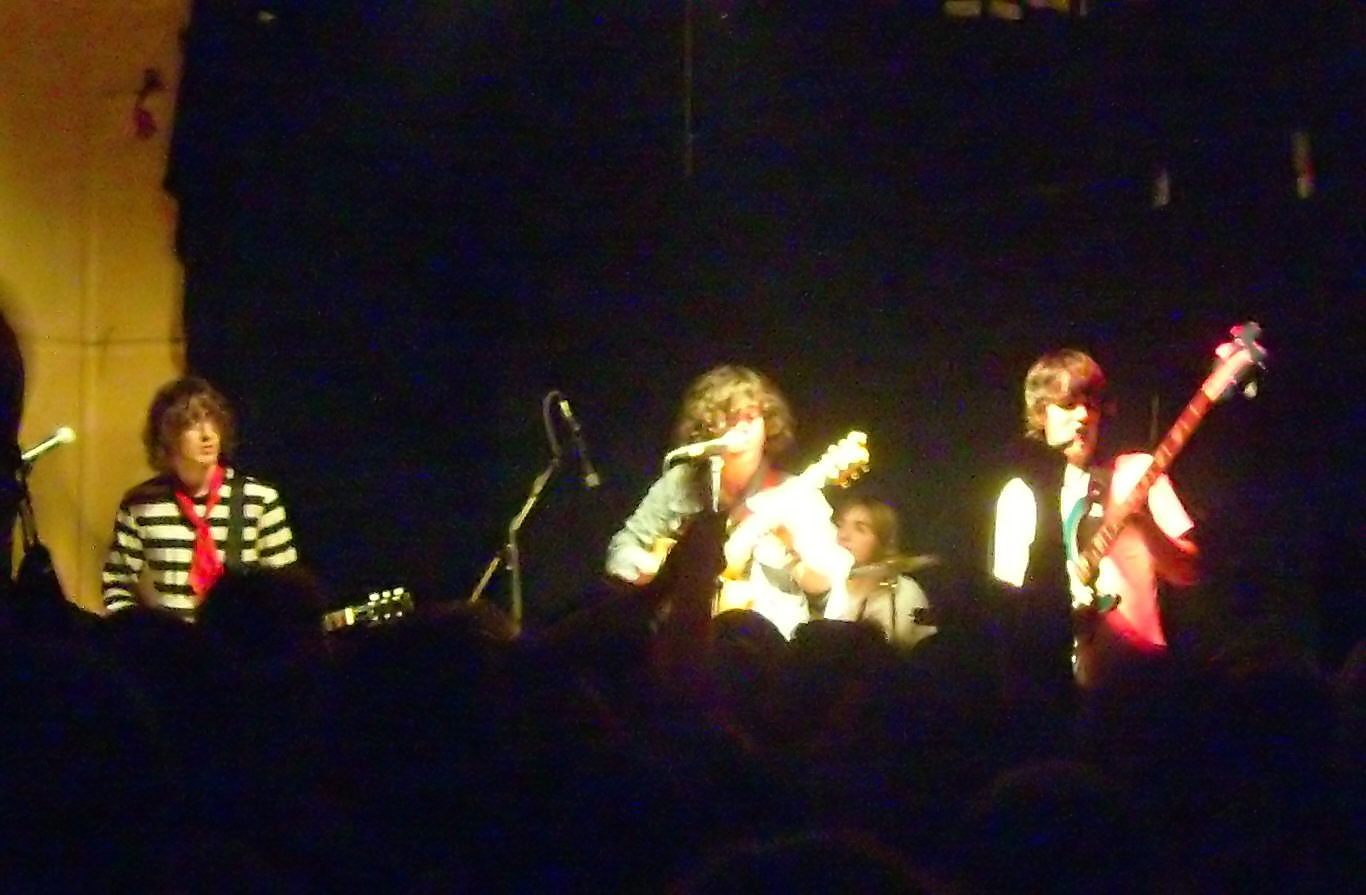
The View performing at The Doghouse, 2006

In mid-2006, they began to record their debut album, with Owen Morris, who had previously produced albums by Oasis and The Verve. During the production of the album, co-writer and bassist Kieren Webster was voted as number six on the NME Cool List 2006 Top 50. Titled Hats Off to the Buskers, the album was released on 22 January 2007 and entered the UK album chart at No. 1 on 28 January.

Following the album's release, the band took part in the NME Awards Tour 2007, alongside acts such as The Automatic, The Horrors and Mumm-Ra and "Wasted Little DJs" was voted Best Track of the year at the annual NME Awards 2007.

The View announced their "Rocket to Russia" tour which visited many countries around Europe such as Holland, Russia and Germany. During the tour, the View played with the Underground Heroes at the Tap'n'Tin in Chatham. At the end of the night, the View and Underground Heroes joined forces on a version of "Same Jeans". The union prompted the band to be called 'The Underground View'. In 2007, the band performed shows in Australia and performed "Same Jeans" on the talk show Rove Live. Instead of waiting on-stage to shake hands with the host, the band immediately left the stage, leaving Rove McManus with a simple pat on the back from Steven Morrison.

Taken from the album, their first single, "Wasted Little DJs", was released 7 August 2006. The song was written about Karlene and Charlene, a pair of hairdressers from Dundee who frequently attended the band's early gigs and gave the band free haircuts. The two women subsequently formed a DJ duo under the name "Wasted Little DJs" and hosted after-parties for the band's local shows. The first single entered the UK top 75 at No. 73 on the week before full release, due to download sales alone, and climbed to No. 15 the following week. Four weeks prior to release, on 9 July 2006, the single entered the UK MTV/NME video charts at Number 9, climbing to Number 1 on 13 August 2006. The single was the BBC Radio 1 Colin and Edith show's record of the week for week commencing Monday, 10 July 2006 and entered the BBC Radio 1 daytime playlist on 12 July 2006. The band followed up with their second single "Superstar Tradesman", released 23 October 2006, also reaching No. 15 in the UK.

"Same Jeans", the third single from the album, was released 15 January 2007. It became their most successful single to date, reaching No. 3 in the UK Singles Chart and becoming a major hit for the band. Subsequent singles however, a double a-side of "The Don"/"Skag Trendy" and "Face for the Radio", failed to receive such chart success, reaching only No. 33 and No. 69 respectively in the UK Singles Chart. "The Don"/"Skag Trendy" is to date the View's last single to chart in the UK top 40.

In early 2006, the band signed to James Endeacott's new record label 1965 Records, part of the Sony BMG group and linked to Columbia Records. A rare live version of "Screamin' n Shoutin'", recorded at the University of Abertay Dundee, headlined the NME/1965 Records cover CD featured with the NME issue dated 25 November 2006. The band announced a national tour in April 2007 to mark the album release. Tickets for the entire UK tour sold out within 1 hour. In August, they headlined the NME/Radio 1 stage at the Carling: Reading and Leeds festival. The band announced a six-date national tour for December 2007 to support their new album due out in 2008.

=== Which Bitch? (2009–2011) ===
The View appeared at Reading and Leeds Festival in August and at the Isle of Wight Festival on 12 June 2009. They also performed on King Tut's Wah Wah Hut Tent stage at T in The Park on 10 July 2009. They supported Mando Diao through Europe in summer and fall. Prior to this they played a sell out tour of Britain including Newcastle University. They played in the Falls Festival Australia December 2009.

The band released their second album Which Bitch? on Monday 2 February 2009. In its initial week of release it debuted at No. 4 in the UK albums chart, but fell to No. 27 the following week and was out of the top 40 another week later. The first single from the album, "5 Rebbecca's" did poorly in the UK charts peaking at just No. 57. It was followed by "Shock Horror", which despite having significantly greater airplay charted even lower at No. 64. The album's third and last single "Temptation Dice" missed the top 100 altogether. Michael Annable leaves band. Limited Edition copies of the album featured a DVD containing their full-length documentary, Dryburgh Style, a gig from the Glasgow Barrowlands and all music videos released up to "Shock Horror".

The View toured in early March 2010, visiting Glasgow, Liverpool, Manchester and Edinburgh. The tour showcased new material from their upcoming album. In addition to this, Kyle Falconer played an acoustic, charity solo show in Liverpool on 27 February. On 23 February 2010, it was announced that the band will play at T in the Park 2010 on the Main stage. The band have also been confirmed for Maynooth university festival, The Gathering. The View played an intimate venue tour during November and December 2010 playing material from the new album. The tour began in Scotland in Aberdeen, then proceeded in England, before finishing back in Scotland at Velocity in Dunfermline.

=== Bread and Circuses (2011–2012) ===
The third album was rumoured to be completed in April 2010. The View have since cancelled a live performance at Delamere Forest due to 'recording commitments'. In an interview with Scottish newspaper The Daily Record, bassist Kieren Webster said the album is being produced by Youth, who has worked with the likes of The Verve and Primal Scream. They produced "Sunday", a track from the forthcoming album, available as a free download from their website, on 1 November. On 17 December 2010, the View informed on their website that the album's name would be The Best Lasts Forever and it would be released on 14 March 2011; however, on 13 January 2011, they announced the album would instead be called Bread and Circuses. They also announced that they would release the first single from the album on 6 March, and that it would be entitled 'Grace'. The song charted outside the UK top 100. Afterwards, the already downloadable "Sunday" was rereleased in June 2011 as part of the Cutting Corners EP which also included album track "Happy" along with two new tracks, "Sideways" and "Alone", which both have had positive reviews from fans. The EP also includes the Tim Hutton remix of "Sunday".

=== Cheeky for a Reason (2012–2013) ===
In an interview with NME after T in the Park 2011, frontman Kyle Falconer said that they had begun to write songs for the fourth album, and that it could be out by Christmas. However, he later admitted that these comments were rather over-enthusiastic, and the album would be ready around the summer of 2012. In autumn 2011, their website announced they were going to record demos in T Pot studios, the same studio they recorded the demos for Hats Off To The Buskers. Speaking about the album's sound, Kyle Falconer said it was "Fleetwood Mac's Rumours done by The Clash." A free download of the album track, "Hold On Now" was available for a limited period in May 2012 to give fans a taster of the new album. This went down well and the band have since announced that their first single from the album will be "How Long", which was released on 9 July 2012.

The first gigs that the View played in 2011 were at King Tut's in Glasgow, on 25 and 26 January. They were both sold out. A tour to promote the new album was announced on 31 January, and will begin on 4 April. It will involve three Scottish gigs: the Caird Hall in Dundee, Aberdeen Music Hall and Barrowlands in Glasgow. On 21 March 2011, it was announced they would attend the Reading and Leeds festival. On 8 July, they played on the main stage at T in the Park.

After the release of "Cheeky for a Reason", the View announced it would begin touring in November and December. They kicked off the tour at Stoke Sugarmill on 28 November. The tours stops included, Bournemouth, London, Sunderland, Derby, Norwich, Birmingham, Liverpool, Glasgow and ended with a homecoming show at Dundee on 19 December. They headlined the Saturday of RockNess festival however this was abandoned after three songs due to over-crowding and rescheduled to the Sunday. They also played Main stage at T in the Park 2012 under the guise of The Dryburgh Soul Band.

=== Seven Year Setlist (2013–2015) ===
On 10 April 2013, the View announced they would be releasing a compilation album called Seven Year Setlist. The album has been named this due to the fact that the track listing features songs that are most commonly played in the set-lists at the band's concerts (excluding the new tracks). The compilation features several of the band's singles mixed with a couple of album tracks which feature heavily in the band's usual setlist. The album has been rumored to release around September, the time Kyle reminds us when he "Was attacked by the geese at camper down zoo" In a new interview with Clash Music. It is to includes 3 brand new unheard tracks: "Kill Kyle", "Dirty Magazine", and "Standard".

The View are due to play several gigs in support of the release of the compilation, including a string of performances at the Propaganda Indie Club nights across the UK, an intimate gig at King Tut's Wah Wah Hut, they also supported the Stone Roses at their Glasgow Green concert on 15 June 2013.

The band announced unplugged show scheduled for June in Edinburgh, Aberdeen and three dates at Oran Mor in Glasgow. All shows sold-out within hours of going on general sale. A special one-off show was scheduled for Shetland, their second on the island, with the previous gig being in December 2012.

=== Ropewalk, hiatus, reunion and Exorcism of Youth (2015–present) ===
The View's fifth studio album was produced by Albert Hammond Jr. and is entitled Ropewalk after the Hamburg Reeperbahn district where it was recorded. The album was due to be released on 8 June 2015 with a UK tour held throughout March and April 2015. However, on 13 May 2015 it was announced that the album release will be postponed until 11 September 2015, due to Kyle receiving treatment for an unspecified but ongoing illness. Release was then brought forward to 4 September 2015. To coincide with the release the View played in-store performances at music stores throughout Scottish cities as well as a one-off exclusive gig in their hometown of Dundee.

The band played a number of festivals throughout 2015 including the main stage at T in the Park and supported Paolo Nutini at Glasgow Summer Sessions at Bellahouston Park in August 2015. They played a further UK tour throughout September and October culminating in three sold-out appearances at Edinburgh's Liquid Rooms. After this tour, festive dates in Dundee and Glasgow were announced along with a Hogmanay headline show in Glasgow's King Tut's Wah Wah Hut and Edinburgh. The Ropewalk tour will continue throughout January and February 2016 with gigs throughout various European cities before a further UK-wide tour in March and April.

In February 2017, the band celebrated their 10th anniversary by playing a record-breaking run of six shows at Glasgow's King Tut's Wah Wah Hut. Tickets for these six shows sold-out in 20 minutes. This was followed by a full UK tour throughout May 2017 to celebrate the 10th anniversary of the release of their debut album and also saw the band inducted into the Barrowland Ballroom Hall of Fame. During 2017, the band announced they would be taking a one-year hiatus in order to pursue other projects including singer Kyle Falconer's debut solo album. The band played their last show of 2017 on 1 December to a sold-out crowd in their hometown of Dundee.

In February 2023, the band announced their reunion by detailing their sixth studio album, Exorcism of Youth. The band also shared the album's lead single, "Feels Like". Although Falconer, Webster and Reilly participated in the reunion, Morrison opted not to rejoin the band. He was replaced by Miles Kane drummer Jay Sharrock in both a touring and session capacity.

On 10 May, 2023, during a concert at The Deaf Institute in Manchester, an on-stage altercation occurred between Falconer and Webster. A subsequent concert in London on 11 May 2023 was postponed. In an ensuing statement, the band described the altercation as "a brotherly bust-up that went too far" and assured fans that their remaining tour dates would be going ahead.

== Members ==
Current members

- Kyle Falconer – lead vocals, rhythm guitar, piano, ukulele, harmonica, bass (2005–2017, 2022–present)
- Kieren Webster – bass, backing and occasional lead vocals, rhythm guitar (2005–2017, 2022–present)
- Pete Reilly – lead guitar (2005–2017, 2022–present)

Current touring and session musicians

- Darren Rennie – keyboards (2009–2017, 2022–present)
- Jay Sharrock – drums, percussion (2022–present)
- Drew Palmer – lead guitar, backing vocals (2024–present)

Former members

- Steven Morrison – drums, percussion (2005–2017)

== Discography ==
Studio albums

- Hats Off to the Buskers (2007)
- Which Bitch? (2009)
- Bread and Circuses (2011)
- Cheeky for a Reason (2012)
- Ropewalk (2015)
- Exorcism of Youth (2023)
