= Kyle Falconer =

Scottish musician (born 1987)

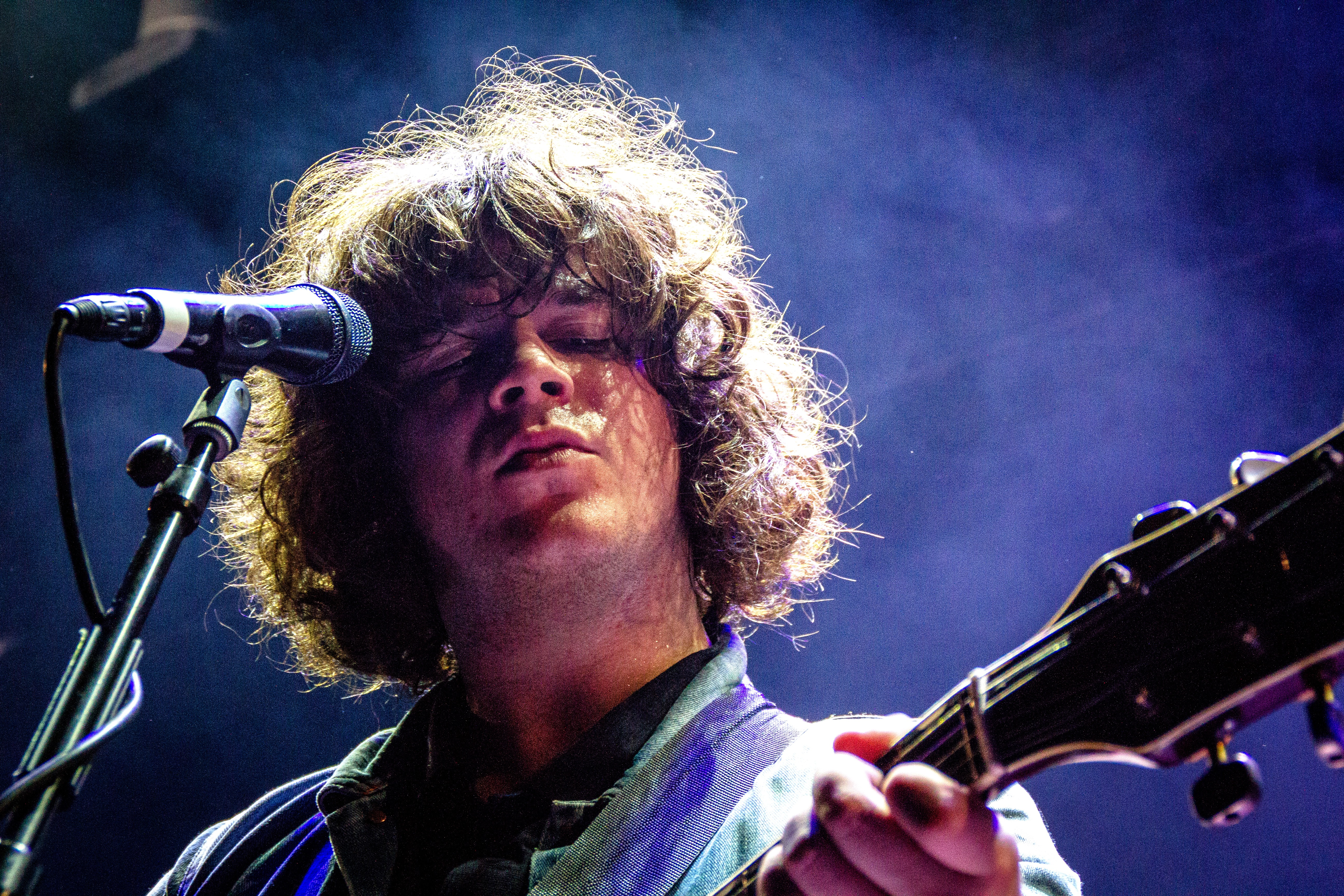
- Falconer performing with The View in 2012

Background information
- Born: Kyle Francis Falconer; 6 June 1987 (age 39); Dundee, Scotland
- Genre: Indie rock
- Instruments: Vocals, guitar, piano, bass guitar, harmonica, drums
- Years active: 2005–present
- Member of: The View

Kyle Francis Falconer (born 6 June 1987) is a Scottish musician, singer and songwriter. He is best known as the lead vocalist of The View. Along with the other band members, Falconer hails from the Dryburgh district of Dundee. He shares songwriting responsibilities with bass guitarist Kieren Webster.

In July 2018, Falconer released his debut solo album titled No Thank You independently. The record reached number 1 on the Record Store Chart in the week of the release and achieved a top 40 position in the UK Album Chart. The No Thank You tour commenced in August 2018, and saw Falconer play in venues across the UK with sold out shows in Glasgow, Aberdeen, Prestwick, Manchester, Leeds, Liverpool, Falkirk, Inverness and his hometown of Dundee.

== Personal life ==
When he was 16, Falconer's father died; his mother died when Falconer was 22: he attributed some of his substance abuse to these traumatic events.

From May 2016, he lived in Dundee with his fiancée, Laura Wilde. Their first child, Wylde Elizabeth Falconer, was born on 10 April 2017. Falconer shared the news on social media, calling the birth "The Stuff dreams are made of". On 28 August 2018, he announced that he and Wilde had another child due March 2019, stating that it was "Another branch being added to the family tree."

== Influences ==
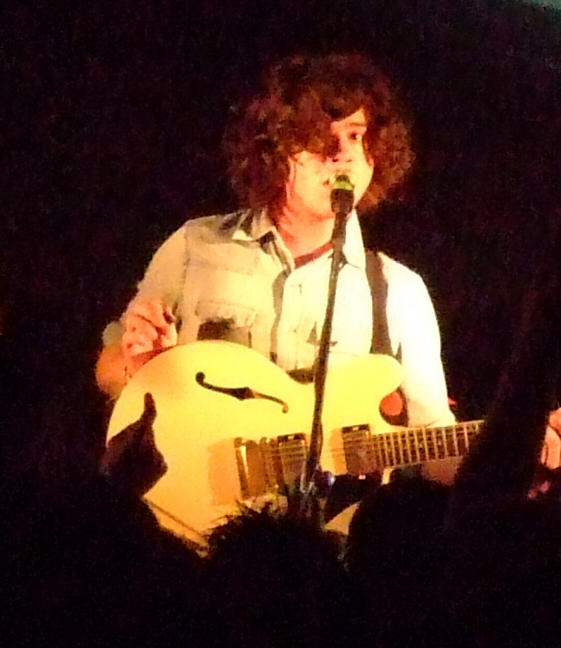
Falconer performing in 2007

In interviews Falconer frequently cites Oasis, The Beatles, The Clash, Fleetwood Mac and Squeeze as influences. Although all members of The View are said to be fans of The Beatles, Falconer is deemed to be the most infatuated. In 2008 he claimed that the band were the first thing he thought about in the morning. The following year, he admitted that when he met Paul McCartney he was so overwhelmed that he "had to run to the toilet and just burst into tears". He further added, "I love The Beatles. I wanted to ask him to collaborate with us."

Falconer also notes that he "still gets a bit of a judder" when he bumps into Liam and Noel Gallagher, as despite his own fame, he finds it strange to have become an acquaintance of his idols. In 2000, several years before The View's commercial success, Falconer and bandmate Pete Reilly attended Scottish music festival T in the Park to see Oasis perform live, and were positioned at the front of the crowd. Falconer speaks regularly about his love for Fleetwood Mac, in particular Stevie Nicks. In 2008, Falconer told The List that the last thing he thinks of before he goes to sleep at night is "getting married to Stevie Nicks in her prime".

== Substance abuse ==
In 2007, Falconer was arrested for possession of three grams of cocaine (which police officers estimated had a street value of approximately £150) after a gig at Abertay University. His defence agent, Billy Boyle, claimed Falconer had been passed the drug by music industry insiders at the gig and further claimed he had not ingested any of it. On behalf of Falconer, Boyle requested an absolute discharge, as it was deemed that a conviction would hinder the possibility of a future North American tour. Sheriff Paul Arthurson denied the request, fining Falconer £1000. The View have since been refused entry to the US, prompting public claims from Falconer that they are permanently banned from both America and Japan. In interviews since the conviction, however, the band have insisted that drugs are no longer an issue and they are hoping to fulfil a tour of the States in the near future.

On more than one occasion, Falconer has been unable to perform due to excessive alcohol consumption. During an extensive British tour in 2008, it was reported that Falconer arrived on stage at The Social in Nottingham so drunk that his band were eventually forced to replace him with the vocalist from The View's support act, The Law. In attempt to remedy the situation, the band rescheduled the show and returned to Nottingham just months later, where Falconer fulfilled his usual duties.

In 2009, the band's set at Austria's Snowbombing Festival descended into chaos after Falconer collapsed on stage. After fainting, Falconer left the stage fifteen minutes into the band's set. Bassist Kieren Webster apologised to the crowd that Falconer was unwell.

== Legal issues ==
In June 2016, Falconer was in an air rage incident. Told he'd be unable to sit with his partner, Falconer hurled abuse at the couple sitting next to him before calling a cabin crew member a "poof". His actions caused the Glasgow-bound Jet2 flight from Reus Airport to divert to Nantes where he was arrested before continuing to Glasgow. The diversion cost £14,000 for fuel, compensation for passengers who missed connecting flights and other airport costs. Falconer also had to pay nearly £9,000 in legal fees and was fined £1,000.

== Discography ==
Solo albums

- No, Thank You (2018)
- No Love Songs for Laura (2021)
- The One I Love the Most (2025)
- Lovely Night of Terror (2026)

Solo EPs

- Almost Pleasant (2019)

Singles

- "Laura" (2021)
- "Stressball" (2021)

Singles as featured artist

- "The Bike Song" (2010) credited to Mark Ronson & The Business Intl. featuring Kyle Falconer and Spank Rock (number 17 on the UK Charts)
