= Kieren Webster =

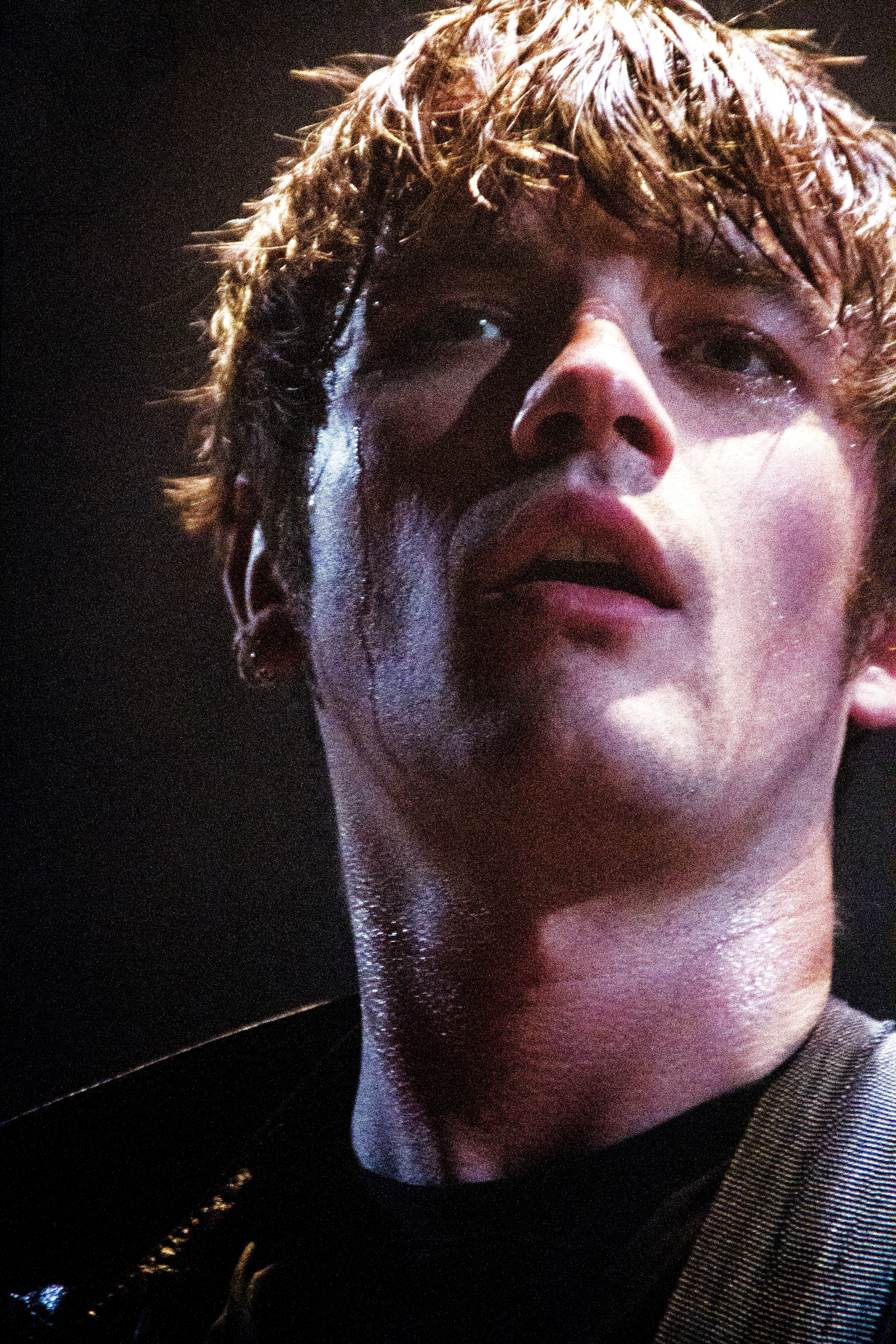
- Webster in 2012

Background information
- Born: Kieren Clark Webster; 10 May 1986 (age 39); Dundee, Scotland
- Occupations: Musician, songwriter, Bassist
- Instruments: Vocals, Bass guitar, guitar
- Member of: The View, WEB

Kieren Clark Webster (born 10 May 1986) is the bass guitarist and occasional lead vocalist for Scottish band The View; he is also the lead vocalist for band WEB. On 27 March 2020 WEB released their first single 'Haze'. Along with frontman Kyle Falconer, he writes the majority of The View's material. In 2006, he was placed 6th in NME's Cool List. He and Falconer alternate roles on some songs such as "Skag Trendy", "Gran's for Tea", "One Off Pretender", "Realisation", "Fireworks and Flowers", "Hole in the Bed" and "Cracks", with Webster taking on guitar and lead vocals and Falconer replacing him as bass guitarist and backing vocalist. He and other band members are from the Dryburgh district of Dundee.
