= L.A. Times (album) =

Studio album by Travis
- Released: 12 July 2024
- Recorded: December 29, 2023 – April 12, 2024
- Studio: Dave's Room, North Hollywood, Los Angeles
- Genre: Alternative rock, indie rock, folk, Pop Rock, Indie Pop, Lo-Fi
- Length: 32:12
- Label: BMG; Red Telephone Box
- Producer: Tony Hoffer

Travis studio album chronology
10 Songs (2020)	L.A. Times (2024)

Singles from L.A. Times
- 1. "Gaslight" Released: 20 March 2024; 2. "Bus" Released: 28 June 2024; 3. "Naked in New York City" Released: 19 July 2024; 4. "The River" Released: 22 November 2024; 5. "Raze the Bar" Released: 6 December 2024

L.A. Times is the tenth studio album by the Scottish rock band Travis, released on 12 July 2024 through BMG Rights Management. It was produced by Tony Hoffer and received generally positive reviews from critics. It became their highest charting album in the United Kingdom since the release of Where You Stand in 2013, reaching number four on the UK Albums Charts, whilst in their native Scotland, it debuted atop the Scottish Albums Charts. The album's song "Raze the Bar" features guest appearances by Chris Martin of Coldplay and Brandon Flowers of The Killers.

== Critical reception ==
Professional ratings
Aggregate scores
Source	Rating
Metacritic	71/100
Review scores
Source	Rating
AllMusic	4/5 stars
Clash	7/10
Mojo	3/5 stars
MusicOMH	3/5 stars
PopMatters	6/10
Record Collector	3/5 stars
Uncut	7/10
Under the Radar	7.5/10 stars

L.A. Times received a score of 71 out of 100 on review aggregator Metacritic based on nine critics' reviews, which the website categorised as "generally favorable" reception. Mojo felt that "it's unlikely to set anything alight, but LA Times still leaves a warm glow", while Record Collector called it "introspection with a keen ear for accessible melodies that help sweeten the bitter pills with which he's self-medicating". Uncut commented that "Travis continue to subtly experiment with their sound, and on this 10th studio set it regularly pays dividends".

Stephen Thomas Erlewine of AllMusic commented that "Travis aren't attempting to revive the hunger and ambition that fueled them as young men, they're testing the creative boundaries of middle age as they take stock of the state of a world in tumult." Clash's Robin Murray described it as "a succinct example of Travis' musicality. A mixed bag, it's held together by feverish energy, and some of the band's mainstays – the emotional curiosity, the willingness to think outside the box, and those empathetic vocals". Lee Campbell of Under the Radar remarked that L.A. Times is "at times wistfully joyful, yet also menacing and dark. It could be their most personal and exposed record in years, and as a result its honesty really strikes a chord."

MusicOMH's Chris White found that "it's hard not to admire a band who, a generation on from their heyday, continue to craft their undemanding but eminently listenable songs with passion and charm". Writing for PopMatters, Patrick Gill summarised that "the record does not deliver a consistent or compelling message, despite moments of quality that have always been present for a band of their caliber".

== Track listing ==
All tracks are written by Fran Healy; "Alive" written with Tony Hoffer; "L.A. Times" written with Dougie Payne, Andy Dunlop and Neil Primrose.

L.A. Times track listing
No.	Title	Length
1.	"Bus"	3:23
2.	"Raze the Bar"	3:05
3.	"Live It All Again"	3:23
4.	"Gaslight"	3:23
5.	"Alive"	2:48
6.	"Home"	3:05
7.	"I Hope That You Spontaneously Combust"	2:18
8.	"Naked in New York City"	4:23
9.	"The River"	2:16
10.	"L.A. Times"	4:08
Total length:		32:12

Note

- A deluxe edition includes stripped versions of all tracks on a second disc.

== Personnel ==
Travis

- Fran Healy – lead vocals, acoustic guitar, electric guitar, piano, backing vocals, programming, art direction
- Dougie Payne – bass guitar, double bass, backing vocals
- Andy Dunlop – electric guitar, acoustic guitar, piano, mellotron, keyboards, backing vocals
- Neil Primrose – drums, percussion

Additional contributors

- Tony Hoffer – production, mixing, programming, keyboards
- Stewart Cole – trumpet
- Jacob Scesney – saxophone
- Devon Taylor – trombone
- Dave Cooley – mastering
- The Indian – mixing
- Cameron Lister – engineering
- Steve Olmon – engineering assistance
- The Indian – Dolby Atmos mixing
- Stefan Ruiz – all photography
- Joe Waghorn – design
- Chris Martin – choir vocals on "Raze the Bar"
- Brandon Flowers – choir vocals on "Raze the Bar"

== Tours ==
=== L.A Times Promo Tour ===
The "L.A Times Promo Tour" was the warm up tour for the L.A Times album which was made up of 15 shows across the United Kingdom and the United States in 2024 with the first show starting in Little Hadham on 6 July 2024 and the last show in Alcester on the 25 August 2024.

L.A Times Promo Tour
- Tour by Travis
- Associated album: L.A Times
- Start date: 6 July 2024
- End date: 25 August 2024
- Legs: 2
- No. of shows: 15

Travis concert chronology
- The Invisible Band 20th Anniversary Tour (2022); L.A Times Promo Tour (2024); Raze the Bar Tour (2024–25)

=== Raze the Bar Tour ===
The "Raze the Bar Tour" is the main associated tour for the L.A. Times album. The tour started in Amsterdam on the 26 August 2024.

The tour includes concerts around the world such as the UK, Spain, Germany, Mexico and a number of shows in the US.

== Charts ==
Chart performance for L.A. Times
Chart (2024)	Peak position
German Albums (Offizielle Top 100)	15
Scottish Albums (Official Charts)	1
Spanish Albums (Promusicae)	76
Swiss Albums (Schweizer Hitparade)	75
UK Albums (Official Charts)	4
UK Independent Albums (Official Charts)	1
