= Moving (Travis song) =

Single by Travis

from the album Where You Stand
- Released: 1 July 2013
- Recorded: November 2012
- Genre: Alternative rock, new wave
- Length: 4:32
- Label: Red Telephone Box
- Songwriter: Dougie Payne
- Producer: Michael Ilbert

Travis singles chronology
"Where You Stand" (2013)	"Moving" (2013)	"Mother" (2013)

Music video
- Travis – "Moving" on YouTube

"Moving" is a song by alternative rock band Travis. It was released on 1 July 2013 as the second single to promote the band's seventh studio album, Where You Stand. "Moving" was written by the band's bassist Dougie Payne. The song has charted in Japan.

== Composition ==
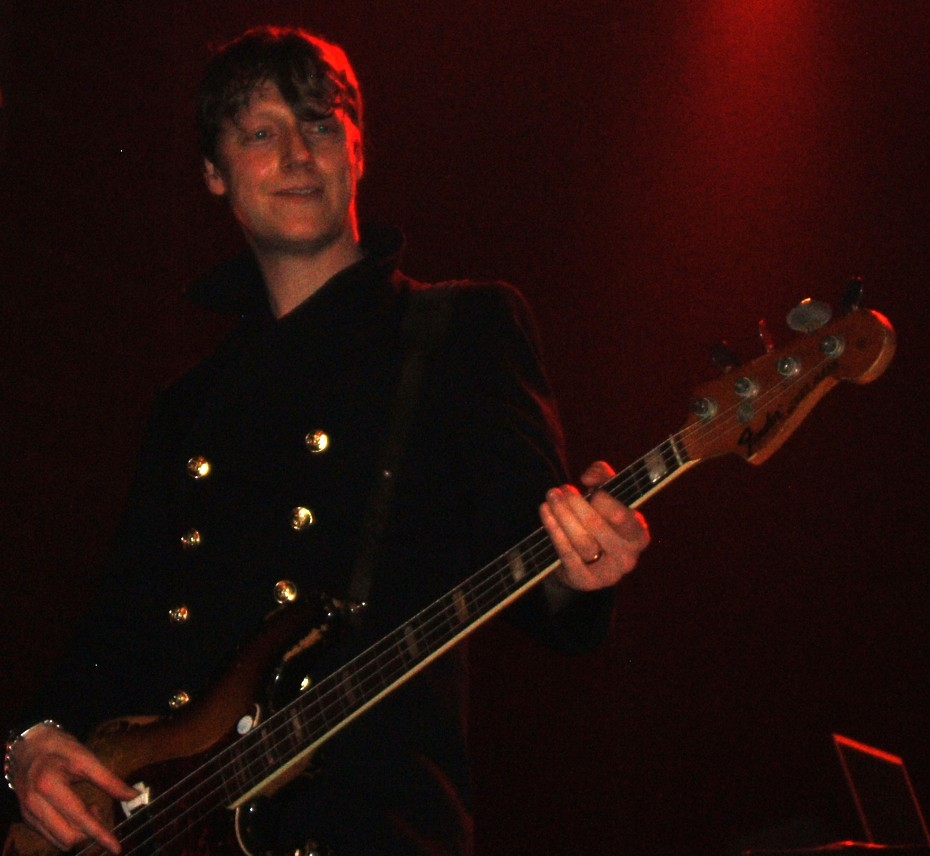
The song was written by Travis bassist Dougie Payne.

In an album commentary, Dougie Payne said the song was inspired by his frequent moves, and the feeling of moving house every six months: "It was kinda this notion of this perpetual motion."

In an interview with The Daily Telegraph music critic Neil McCormick, Travis frontman Fran Healy said, "There was a moment, when my son Clay was two, and we were looking at the little globe in the house, and I was going, here's where Nana is, and here's Australia, and he said, 'Where do you live, Papa?' My heart broke. I was going, 'I live here with you', and he had this incredulous look on his face – 'no, you don't.' And he really meant it, because we spent so much time touring."

== Recording ==
The song was recorded in November 2012. Payne said, "It was really all about the vocal, kind of getting up to that point, to make it, to kinda lift it, and make it not kinda linear and repetitive. Actually kind of create those peaks." The notes in the chorus were "really high" for vocalist Fran Healy, so during the first recording of the song he sang them in falsetto. When he listened to it the next morning, "it just sounded weak". However, Healy remembered being told about an effect that adrenaline can have on human voice, so he decided to run into the North Sea, which was just outside the recording studio, to get the shock that would make his body release the hormone. After spending a minute in cold water, he ran up the beach straight into the studio, and recorded the vocals.

== Music video ==
A music video for the song was released onto YouTube on 1 July 2013. It was directed by Tom "Wriggles" Wrigglesworth and Matt "Robins" Robinson. The video is based on a concept from Wriggles & Robins' short film titled Love Is in the Air, released for Valentine's Day 2013. It shows Travis band members standing in cold air, with a series of animations projected into their breaths, telling a story of a character that runs, flies and swims, among others. In some of the scenes, the animation becomes a mirror image of Travis vocalist Fran Healy. The video was filmed in real time, using no post production. On 8 July 2013, a making-of video was released onto YouTube.

== Track listing ==
Digital download
No.	Title	Length
1.	"Moving"	4:32

== Personnel ==
Travis

- Fran Healy – lead vocals, guitar
- Dougie Payne – bass guitar
- Andy Dunlop – guitar
- Neil Primrose – drums

== Chart performance ==
=== Weekly charts ===
Chart (2013)	Peak position
Japan Hot 100 (Billboard)	30
