= 10 Songs (Travis album) =

Studio album by Travis
- Released: 9 October 2020
- Recorded: June 2019 – January 2020
- Studio: RAK, London
- Length: 37:52
- Label: BMG; Red Telephone Box
- Producer: Robin Baynton; Fran Healy

Travis chronology
| Everything at Once (2016) | 10 Songs (2020) | L.A. Times (2024) |

Singles from 10 Songs
- 1. "Kissing in the Wind" Released: 3 December 2019; 2. "A Ghost" Released: 3 June 2020; 3. "Valentine" Released: 15 July 2020; 4. "The Only Thing" Released: 24 August 2020; 5. "All Fall Down" Released: 16 September 2020; 6. "Waving at the Window" Released: 6 October 2020; 7. "Nina's Song" Released: 4 December 2020

10 Songs is the ninth studio album by the Scottish band Travis, released on 9 October 2020. The album sees singer Fran Healy return to the role of primary songwriter for the first time since 2003's 12 Memories.

== Critical reception ==
Professional ratings
Aggregate scores
| Source | Rating |
|---|---|
| Metacritic | 78/100 |
Review scores
| Source | Rating |
| AllMusic | 4/5 stars |
| Mojo | 4/5 stars |
| NME | 7/10 |
| Uncut | 4/5 stars |
| Under the Radar | 7/10 |

10 Songs received generally favourable reviews from music critics. At Metacritic, which assigns a normalised rating out of 100 to reviews from mainstream critics, the album received an average score of 78, based on 6 reviews.

== Track listing ==
=== Original release ===
All tracks are written by Fran Healy.

| No. | Title | Length |
|---|---|---|
| 1. | "Waving at the Window" | 3:28 |
| 2. | "The Only Thing (feat. Susanna Hoffs)" | 3:32 |
| 3. | "Valentine" | 3:00 |
| 4. | "Butterflies" | 3:54 |
| 5. | "A Million Hearts" | 4:34 |
| 6. | "A Ghost" | 3:45 |
| 7. | "All Fall Down" | 3:27 |
| 8. | "Kissing in the Wind" | 3:54 |
| 9. | "Nina's Song" | 4:30 |
| 10. | "No Love Lost" | 3:48 |
| Total length: | | 37:52 |

Japanese bonus track

| No. | Title | Length |
|---|---|---|
| 11. | "Kissing In the Wind (Stripped)" | 3:43 |
| Total length: | | 41:35 |

== Personnel ==
Travis

- Fran Healy – lead vocals, rhythm guitar, piano
- Dougie Payne – bass guitar, fuzz bass, backing vocals
- Andy Dunlop – lead guitar, piano, backing vocals
- Neil Primrose – drums, percussion

Additional musicians

- Sally Herbert – violin
- Everton Nelson – violin
- Rachel Robson – viola
- Ian Burdge – cello
- Sarah Wilson – cello

== Charts ==
Chart performance for 10 Songs
| Chart (2020) | Peak position |
|---|---|
| Austrian Albums (Ö3 Austria) | 32 |
| Belgian Albums (Ultratop Wallonia) | 145 |
| French Albums (SNEP) | 160 |
| German Albums (Offizielle Top 100) | 22 |
| Scottish Albums (OCC) | 1 |
| Swiss Albums (Schweizer Hitparade) | 13 |
| UK Albums (OCC) | 5 |
