= J. Smith (song) =

2008 song by Travis

Single by Travis

from the album Ode to J. Smith
- B-side: "Get Up", "Sarah"
- Released: 30 June 2008
- Genre: Indie
- Length: 3:03
- Label: Red Telephone Box
- Songwriters: Healy, Travis
- Producer: Emery Dobyns

Travis singles chronology
"My Eyes" (2007)	"J. Smith" (2008)	"Something Anything" (2008)

"J. Smith" is a song by Scottish band Travis', released in June 2008 as the lead single from their sixth studio album Ode to J. Smith (2008). Written by frontman Fran Healy and produced by Emery Dobyns, it was released as a limited-edition extended play on both 10" vinyl and digital download formats, with only 1,000 copies made of the 10-inch. It became the first single released by Travis to miss the UK Top 100 entirely, peaking at number 115 on the UK Singles Charts. It fared better on the UK Independent Singles Charts, where it peaked at number one, mainly due to strong downloads. The single also performed strongly in their native Scotland, reaching number fifteen on the Scottish Singles Charts.

== Background ==
Although the songs from Ode to J. Smith were previewed in a series of live shows in February 2008, the studio recordings were not intended to be heard until the official release. However, KCRW, an American radio station, got hold of an illegal copy of "J. Smith", and played it on air several times, and subsequently, mp3 files of the song were made and distributed, which Fran Healy contested to on the official forum.

The physical single release was not intended for announcement until late June, however, online retailer Recordstore announced the item for sale on 5 June, meaning that despite an official announcement being made, fans would now know what the first single was going to be. The information was discussed on the band's official forum within hours. Healy posted on the forum that evening, claiming that the band had not intended Recordstore to announce the information, and that the original plan was to gradually release the information to increase excitement.

== Composition ==
Fran Healy explained on Travis' official website about the writing of "J. Smith". He said, "The riff came from nowhere. The strange thing was, I knew immediately these chords were important in some way... When Neilly arrived I played the chords, he played along and we instantly found the pattern. It is the best drum line Neilly has ever done... Dougie then picked up the bass line like he'd been practising it all week... There isn't a bit of fat on the song. Every note, every beat, is perfect." He also adds that Paul McCartney and Luke Pritchard both complimented the song when they first heard it.

== Comparisons ==
Many fans regarded "J. Smith" as a return to some of the rawness and rockiness of their debut album Good Feeling, and the band have revealed that they lyrically connected the two releases in certain ways. The cover art of "J. Smith" was designed by Healy to resemble the original artwork of "All I Want to Do Is Rock", the group's first ever single. The band also resurrected the Red Telephone Box record label, which they created to release "All I Want to Do Is Rock".

== Track listing ==
- 10" Vinyl
1. "J. Smith" - 3:10
2. "Get Up" - 3:12
3. "Sarah" - 4:25

== Charts ==
Chart (2007)	Peak position
Scotland Singles (OCC)	15
UK Indie (OCC)	1
