= Josephine Oniyama =

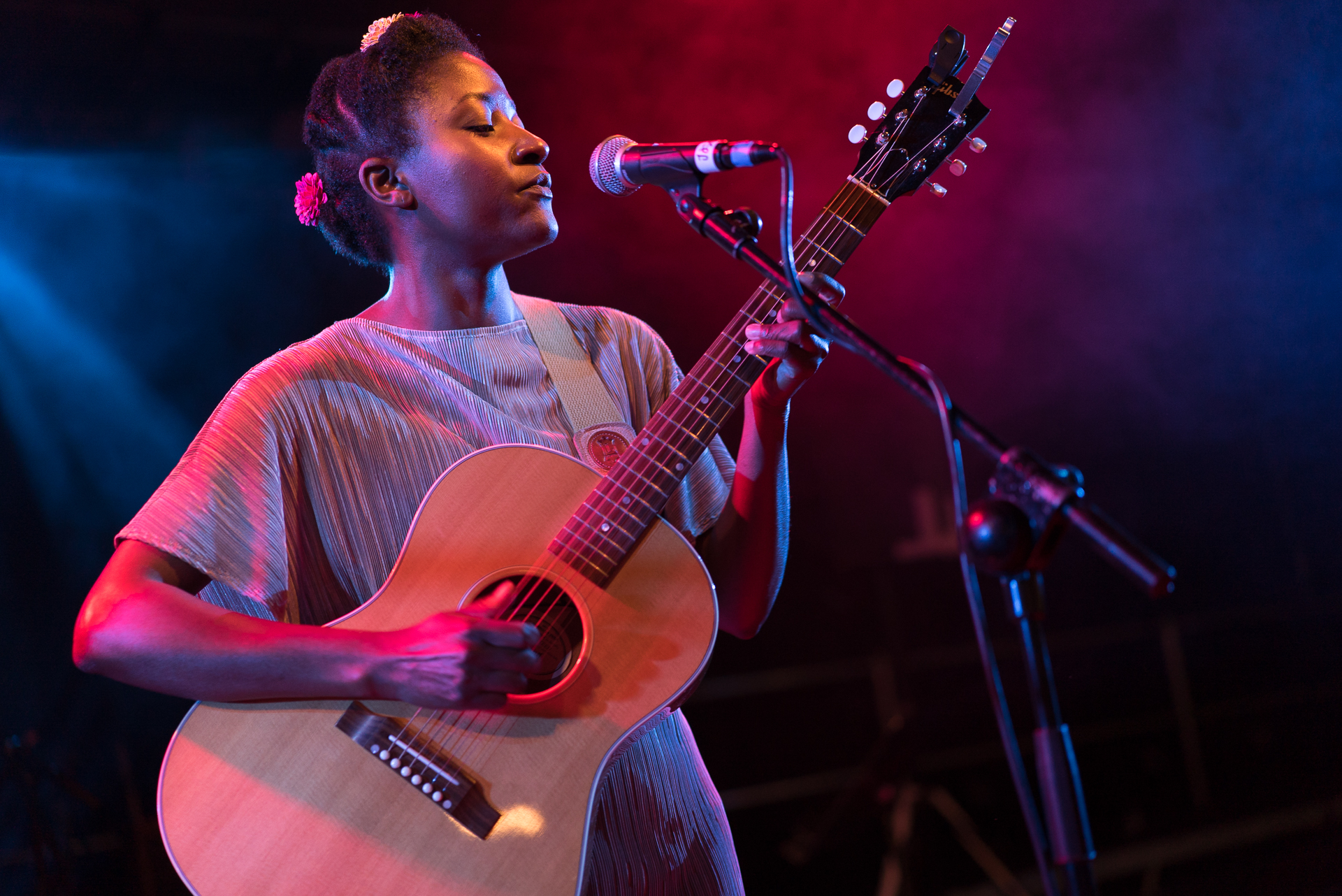

Background information
- Born: 1983 (age 42–43)
- Genres: Soul, Alternative, Folk
- Occupation: Musician
- Instrument: Guitar
- Years active: 2012-present
- Label: Ark Recordings
- Website: www.josephineoniyama.com

Josephine Ejiroghene Oniyama (born 1983 in Manchester) is an English singer-songwriter. She has released three albums and a number of singles.

== Early life ==
Living in the Manchester suburb of Hulme, Oniyama grew up in a colourful West African culture combined with the large musical heritage of Manchester, which shaped her style. She was playing gigs by the age of 15. During her college years she was further influenced by Sister Rosetta Tharpe, Bob Dylan, Joni Mitchell, and Bob Marley. She has Jamaican and Nigerian roots that are reflected in her songs, which cover genres from gospel and country to soul music.

== Career ==
In 2002 Oniyama released her debut album A Smaller Version Of The Real Thing via Storm music Ltd.Steve Long/Dewsbury. a champion of Oniyama's music sent out copies to Radio stations throughout the UK on the premise she was the 21st century Odetta, 10 years later in 2012 Oniyama released her second album Portrait which was produced by Leo Abrahams. The album also features co-writes with Jimmy Hogarth and Ed Harcourt. The album was preceded by singles "What a Day" and "Original Love" (A-listed on BBC Radio 2). The album received positive reviews from The Guardian, The Times, The Mirror, Q and Mojo. The single "Portrait" was played on Radio 2 and was released at about the same time as the album.

Oniyama appeared on 'Later with Jools Holland' and the Andrew Marr Show and more recently performed live from Glastonbury on BBC2.

In 2012 Oniyama backed up Paolo Nutini, Michael Kiwanuka, Rodrigo y Gabriella and The Noisettes in live concerts. She toured with Paloma Faith across her UK tour in early 2013 as well as undertaking her own headline tour in April 2013. Her festival appearances in 2013 include Glastonbury, T in the Park, Latitude and Electric Picnic.

The album Portrait was released in Germany, Austria and Switzerland on 5 July 2013.

In 2015 she contributed by singing on four songs on the jazz album Into Forever by Matthew Halsall & The Gondwana Orchestra.

In 2016, Oniyama appeared on Scottish band Travis' eighth album, Everything at Once. She is featured on the track "Idlewild".

In November 2022, she released her third album, Kindred.

== Releases ==
=== Albums ===
| Title | Album details |
|---|---|
| A Smaller Version of the Real Thing | Released: 2002; Label: Storm Records; Formats: CD (0 684340 000878) |
| Portrait | Released: 5 October 2012 (U.K. release) / 18 October 2013 (Expanded European edition); Label: Ark Recordings; Formats: LP (ARK030LP), CD (ARK030CD), Digital download; Charted at number 26 on the U.K. Independent Albums chart.; Charted at number 97 on the U.K. Album Downloads chart. |
| Kindred | Released: 4 November 2022 / 29 September 2023 (Deluxe edition); Label: Sound of Solar Records; Formats: CD, Digital download |

=== Extended plays ===
| Title | Details |
|---|---|
| In The Labyrinth | Released: 17 November 2008; Label: Island Records; Formats: CD (CLOSERCD2) |
| I Think It Was Love | Released: 11 July 2010; Label: Ark Recordings; Formats: Promo CDr, Digital download |
| A Freak A | Released: 5 December 2010; Label: Ark Recordings; Formats: Promo CDr, Digital download |
| Human | Released: 22 July 2022; Label: Sound of Solar; Formats: Digital download |

=== Singles ===
| Title | Details | Album |
|---|---|---|
| "Bus of Life" | Released: 2001; Label: Ugly Man Records; Formats: CD (UGLY30) | A Smaller Version of the Real Thing |
| "Closer" | Released: 2008; Label: Island Records; Formats: Promo CDr (CLOSERCD1) | In the Labyrinth (EP) |
| "What A Day" | Released: 20 August 2012; Label: Ark Recordings; Formats: 7-inch (ARK031), Promo CDr (ARK031P), Digital download; Charted at number 76 on the U.K. Physical singles chart. | Portrait |
| "Original Love" | Released: 22 October 2012; Label: Ark Recordings; Formats: Promo CDr (ARK034P), Digital download | Portrait |
| "Portrait" | Released: 25 February 2013; Label: Ark Recordings; Formats: Promo CDr (ARK035P), Digital download | Portrait |
| "Last Minute" | Released: 27 May 2013; Label: Ark Recordings; Formats: Promo CDr (ARK038P), Digital download | Portrait |
| "Desert Without a Stream" | Released: 8 November 2013; Label: Embassy Of Music GmbH; Formats: Digital download | Portrait (Expanded edition); Kindred (Deluxe edition) |
| "Idlewild" (Travis featuring Josephine Oniyama) | Released: 23 September 2016; Label: Red Telephone Box; Formats: Promo CD (PHONE20PROMO), Digital download | Everything at Once |
| "'Til You" | Released: 25 August 2017; Label: Sound of Solar Records; Formats: Digital download | Kindred |
| "Badder Weather" (Matthew Halsall & The Gondwana Orchestra feat. Josephine Oniyama) | Released: 26 June 2020; Label: Gondwana Records; Formats: 7-inch (GOND07003) | |
| "Tears Will Never Be Mine" | Released: 3 June 2022; Label: Sound of Solar Records; Formats: Digital download | Human (EP) and Kindred |
| "Burn" | Released: 9 September 2022; Label: Sound of Solar Records; Formats: Digital download | Kindred |
| "Act Like You're in Love" | Released: 28 October 2022; Label: Sound of Solar Records; Formats: Digital download | Kindred |
