= Driftwood (Travis song) =

1999 single by Travis

Single by Travis

from the album The Man Who
- Released: 17 May 1999
- Recorded: January 1999
- Studio: RAK (London, England)
- Genre: Post-Britpop
- Length: 3:33
- Label: Independiente
- Songwriter: Fran Healy
- Producer: Nigel Godrich

Travis singles chronology
"Writing to Reach You" (1999)	"Driftwood" (1999)	"Why Does It Always Rain on Me?" (1999)

"Driftwood" is the second single taken from Indie band Travis' second studio album, The Man Who (1999). It became their biggest hit single up to that point, peaking at number 13 on the UK Singles Chart.

== Background ==
In an interview for NME, Fran revealed that, "The title reputedly comes from the advice of one of my close friends. He advised me not to leave college to concentrate on the band. The lyrics focus on a character who has abandoned all his connections and is now like driftwood - "breaking into pieces... hollow and of no use, waterfalls will find you, bind you, grind you". Driftwood is a song for the person in your life who has so much potential and, yet, doesn't use it, because they're afraid of falling on their backside, you know, they're afraid of making a fool of themselves. But, yet, if they put their minds to it and just threw their plate out the window, they would actually do a lot with it and make themselves happy and other people happy. The chorus came about while I was watching an episode of Cheers. The episode involved an employee overhearing their boss stating that he was going to get rid of the "driftwood" in the company. I then went to do the washing up, and the first line in the chorus just came to me. Also, our original idea was to include the lyrics "caterpillars turn to butterflies", but it was too long to fit with the tune, so we shaved off syllables, changing it to "pillars turn to butter."

== Music video ==
The music video features Healy playing a photographer in a school, about to take a picture of all the pupils. He keeps looking at the blue sky, to see if the weather is perfect, which it is. After the pupils line up, the rest of the band show up, as do the other teachers. Healy then sets the timer, and runs to his seat to wait for the camera to take the picture, but then, it starts to rain heavily. All the pupils stand up and run to shelter, whilst the band members stay in their seats, with the rain pouring down at them still. The music video was filmed in St Philomena's Catholic High School for Girls, located in Carshalton, Surrey. Travis later reprised the teaching roles portrayed in the video for a cameo role in the 2007 comedy-drama film Son of Rambow.

== Track listing ==
- UK CD1
1. "Driftwood" - 3:36
2. "Be My Baby" - 5:15
3. "Where Is The Love?" - 4:17
- UK CD2
1. "Driftwood" - 3:36
2. "Writing To Reach You" (Deadly Avenger's Bayou Blues Mix) - 4:14
3. "Writing To Reach You" (Deadly Avenger's Instrumental Mix) - 4:30
- 7" Vinyl / Cassette
1. "Driftwood" - 3:36
2. "Be My Baby" - 5:15
- European CD1
1. "Driftwood" - 3:36
2. "Writing To Reach You" (Live @ The Melkweg, Amsterdam)
3. "A Good Day To Die" (Live @ The Melkweg, Amsterdam)
4. "Baby One More Time" (Live @ The Melkweg, Amsterdam)
- European CD2
1. "Driftwood" - 3:36
2. "The Fear" (Live On Radio 3FM, Holland) - 4:19
3. "Why Does It Always Rain On Me?" (Live On Radio 3FM, Holland) - 4:31
4. "Driftwood" (Live On Radio 3FM, Holland) - 4:07

== Charts ==
Chart (1999)	Peak position
Scotland Singles (OCC)	7
UK Singles (OCC)	13

== Certifications ==
Region	Certification	Certified units/sales
United Kingdom (BPI)	Silver	200,000^{‡}
^{‡} Sales+streaming figures based on certification alone.
