= Selfish gene =

Selfish gene may refer to:

- Selfish gene theory, the gene-centered view of evolution
- The Selfish Gene, a book by Richard Dawkins discussing the selfish gene theory
- Selfish genetic elements, which are genetic segments that can enhance their own transmission at the expense of other genes in their host genome, most commonly by creating new copies of themselves within that genome.
- "Selfish Gene", a song by Panda Bear from the album Panda Bear Meets the Grim Reaper

== See also ==
- "Selfish Jean", a song by Travis
