= Ode to J. Smith =

Studio album by Travis
- Released: 29 September 2008
- Recorded: February–March 2008
- Studio: RAK Studios
- Genres: Alternative rock, indie rock
- Length: 36:56
- Labels: Red Telephone Box, Fontana
- Producer: Emery Dobyns

Travis chronology
The Boy with No Name (2007)	Ode to J. Smith (2008)	Where You Stand (2013)

Singles from Ode to J. Smith
- 1. "J. Smith" Released: 30 June 2008; 2. "Something Anything" Released: 15 September 2008; 3. "Song to Self" Released: 5 January 2009

Professional ratings
Aggregate scores
Source	Rating
Metacritic	66/100
Review scores
Source	Rating
AllMusic	link
BBC	(Favourable) link
Daily Record	link
Evening Standard	link
Evening Telegraph	(8/10) link
God Is in the TV Zine	link
Metro	link
MusicOMH	link
Pitchfork Media	(5.0/10) link
Planet Sound	(8/10) link

Ode to J. Smith is the sixth studio album by the Scottish rock band Travis, released on 29 September 2008 in the United Kingdom and received generally positive reviews. The album was released in the United States on 4 November 2008. The first single from the album, "J. Smith", was released on 30 June 2008 and the second single "Something Anything", was released on 15 September, and despite being generally well received by Travis fans gained very little airplay.

The album entered the UK Albums Chart at number twenty, becoming the bands lowest charing album in the United Kingdom and spending only three weeks on the chart, whilst in the United States it peaked at 122 on the Billboard 200. It enjoyed stronger commercial success on the Independent Albums Charts in the United Kingdom where it debuted at number two, whilst on the Scottish Albums Charts it debuted at number eight. Similarly, stronger success on the Billboard Independent Albums pursued, where it peaked at fourteen.

== Background ==
The band announced in December 2007 that a short tour was planned for February 2008, with only five dates in different small club venues around the UK. Shortly after, they would start recording their sixth studio album. Singer/songwriter Fran Healy said he would like to record the entire album in two weeks, having been inspired by the speed and simplicity of their recent recording session with Beatles engineer Geoff Emerick while participating in a BBC programme celebrating the 40th Anniversary of the Sgt. Pepper's Lonely Hearts Club Band album.

The band road-tested the new material in their February 2008 club shows. It was announced in February 2008 that Travis had left Independiente as they had "come to the end of our deal and decided to go as it was time to start afresh", according to Healy. The band recorded the album at RAK Studios in London for two weeks between February and March. Afterward, Healy went to mix the record in New York between March and April. The cover of the album was designed by Healy to resemble the original artwork for "All I Want to Do Is Rock", the group's first ever single.

Fran Healy announced on the band's official website, that 1000 copies of the song "J. Smith" had been pressed and would be available to buy as an EP called J. Smith EP, along with two other new songs, from 30 June 2008. However, Healy confirmed that the EP would not be the 'official' first single from the album, which was "Something Anything". The EP was released on 'Red Telephone Box Records', which was the label Travis set up to release their first EP "All I Want to Do Is Rock" 12 years previously.

== Release and reception ==
Following a short UK tour, where the band tested some new material, Travis recorded their sixth album in two weeks in February/March 2008, having been inspired by the speed and simplicity of their recent recording session with Beatles engineer Geoff Emerick while participating in a BBC programme celebrating the 40th Anniversary of the Sgt. Pepper's Lonely Hearts Club Band album.

In early June 2008, a vinyl EP of the song "J. Smith" was announced online as the first release from Ode to J. Smith for 30 June. It was an EP limited to 1000 copies and not an 'official' single, instead more of a taster of the album for fans.

Fran Healy said, "The album is called Ode to J. Smith partly giving a heads up to the key song and partly because all the songs are written about nameless characters or to nameless characters." He has also described the album as a novel with 12 chapters, with each chapter being a song. In live shows promoting the album in spring 2009, Healy said the song Friends was written from the perspective of the girlfriend of the album protagonist (J. Smith), about friends who are only there to ask for favours. The album would be released through their own record label Red Telephone Box, with the lead single "Something Anything" being released on 15 September. Two weeks later on 29 September, Ode to J. Smith was released. The band also headlined a 12-gig UK tour to coincide with the releases between 22 September and 8 October. The second single released from Ode To J. Smith was "Song to Self", on 5 January 2009.

Ode to J. Smith received positive reviews from music critics. At Metacritic, which assigns a normalised rating out of 100 to reviews from mainstream critics, the album received an average score of 66 based on 17 reviews, which indicates "generally favorable reviews". Early reviews were very positive, with some calling it Travis' best record ever. In the December 2008 issue of Q Magazine, Ode To J Smith appeared at number 28 on a list of the Readers' Best Albums Of 2008.

== Track listing ==
All tracks are written by Fran Healy, except where noted.

No.	Title	Writer(s)	Length
1.	"Chinese Blues"		3:46
2.	"J. Smith"		3:04
3.	"Something Anything"	Healy, Dougie Payne	2:22
4.	"Long Way Down"	Healy, Payne	2:39
5.	"Broken Mirror"		3:12
6.	"Last Words"	Healy, Payne	4:11
7.	"Quite Free"	Healy, Payne, Andy Dunlop	4:00
8.	"Get Up"	Healy, Payne	3:13
9.	"Friends"		3:24
10.	"Song to Self"		3:46
11.	"Before You Were Young"		3:19

Japanese Bonus Track
No.	Title	Length
12.	"Sarah"	4:26

== Personnel ==
- Fran Healy – vocals, guitar, harmonica
- Andy Dunlop – guitar
- Dougie Payne – bass guitar, backing vocals
- Neil Primrose – drums
- Emery Dobyns – producer, mixer, engineer

== Charts ==
Chart performance
Chart (2008)	Peak position
Austrian Albums (Ö3 Austria)	36
Belgian Albums (Ultratop Flanders)	95
Belgian Alternative Albums (Ultratop Flanders)	39
Belgian Albums (Ultratop Wallonia)	69
Dutch Alternative Albums (Alternative Top 30)	24
French Albums (SNEP)	87
German Albums (Offizielle Top 100)	49
Italian Albums (FIMI)	95
Japanese Albums (Oricon)	33
Mexican Albums (Top 100 Mexico)	51
Norwegian Albums (VG-lista)	27
Scottish Albums (Official Charts)	8
Swiss Albums (Schweizer Hitparade)	16
UK Albums (Official Charts)	20
UK Independent Albums (Official Charts)	2
US Billboard 200	122
US Independent Albums (Billboard)	14
