= Another Guy =

Song by Travis

from the album Where You Stand
- Released: 20 March 2013
- Genre: Alternative rock
- Length: 3:38
- Label: Red Telephone Box
- Songwriter: Fran Healy

"Another Guy" is a song by Scottish alternative rock band Travis. The song was released onto their official website on 20 March 2013 as a pre-single teaser for their seventh studio album, Where You Stand.

== Music video ==
A lo-fi music video for the song, shot on VHS, was helmed by German feature director Wolfgang Becker and cinematographed by Jürgen Jürges. It was released onto YouTube on 20 March 2013. Nick Knight of Promo News wrote: "It’s a wonderfully absurd comedy exploring a dynamic of crumbling love and trust between the members of Travis, the catalyst being the presence of another guy who happens to be played with a certain level of menace by the director himself."
