= Song to Self =

"Song To Self"

Single by Travis

from the album Ode to J. Smith
- A-side: "Song to Self"
- B-side: "Ballad of J. Smith"
- Released: 5 January 2009
- Recorded: 2008
- Genre: Indie pop
- Length: 3:46
- Label: Red Telephone Box
- Songwriter: Fran Healy
- Producer: Emery Dobyns

Travis singles chronology
"Something Anything" (2008)	"Song To Self" (2009)	"Where You Stand" (2013)

"Song To Self" is a song by Scottish band Travis, released as the third and final single from their sixth studio album, Ode to J. Smith (2008). Written by frontman Fran Healy and produced by American producer Emery Dobyns, it was released on 5 January 2009. Since its release, the song has since been credited as a highlight track from the album, credited as being a standout song largely in part due to its "emotional depth, relatable lyrics, and a more raw, immediate sound" than the bands previous works.

Despite popularity amongst contemporary music critics and fans alike, "Song to Self" continued a poor form of charting success for the band in a similar manner experienced by the preceding singles released from Ode to J. Smith. Like the previous two singles, it failed to chart on the main UK Singles Charts, but did reach number two on the UK Independent Singles Charts. In their native Scotland, it peaked at number twenty on the Scottish Singles Charts, and in Germany, peaked at number eighty-eight.

== Background ==
An extended version of Song To Self, which features a middle 8 and an additional chorus, is included on the 7" vinyl pressing. The music video for the song depicts singer Fran Healy emphasising the theme of loneliness in the lyrics of the song. The video received heavy airplay in Mexico, especially on VH1 Latin America. The song has been described by Female First as a "laid back" track, claiming that if the song was any more laid back "it would be on its back", claiming that it is ample background music but requires for "oomph" for it to stand out as a single release.

== Track listing ==
- CD Single
1. "Song To Self" - 3:46
2. "Tail Of The Tiger" - 2:46
- 7" Vinyl
1. "Song To Self" (Extended Version) - 4:44
2. "Ballad Of J. Smith" - 3:02

== Charts ==
Chart (2008)	Peak position
German Singles Chart	88
Scotland Singles (OCC)	20
UK Indie (OCC)	2
