= Something Anything =

Single by Travis

from the album Ode to J. Smith
- A-side: "Something Anything"
- B-side: "Tail Of The Tiger, Used To Belong, Lola"
- Released: 15 September 2008
- Recorded: 2007–2008
- Genre: Indie rock
- Length: 2:22
- Label: Red Telephone Box
- Songwriter: Dougie Payne/Fran Healy
- Producer: Emery Dobyns

Travis singles chronology
"J.Smith" (2008)	"Something Anything" (2008)	"Song to Self" (2009)

"Something Anything" is a song by Scottish band Travis, released in September 2008 as the second single from their sixth studio album Ode to J. Smith (2008). Written by band members Dougie Payne and Fran Healy, it was produced by Emery Dobyns and recorded at RAK Studios in London. Whilst it became the second single by the band to miss the Top 100 in the United Kingdom, it did however peak at number one on the UK Independent Singles Charts, and number six on the Scottish Singles Charts.

== Background ==
The single was released on 15 September 2008. It is the first Travis single not to be written by singer Fran Healy, as bassist Dougie Payne is credited to having co-written the song. It was the only song on the album not to be written during a 5-week album sessions writing period, and was instead written months later. Payne also wrote the B-side, "Tail of the Tiger". The artwork of the single shows a heart, with a hole in either side, representing the main song and two b-sides, as confirmed by singer Fran Healy.

== Track listing ==
- CD Single
1. "Something Anything" - 2:22
2. "Tail Of The Tiger" - 2:49
3. "Used To Belong" - 3:26
- 7" Vinyl
1. "Something Anything" - 2:22
2. "Lola" - 4:09

== Charts ==
Chart (2008)	Peak position
Scotland Singles (OCC)	6
UK Singles Chart	113
UK Indie (OCC)	1
