= Where You Stand (song) =

Single by Travis

from the album Where You Stand
- Released: 30 April 2013
- Genre: Alternative rock; indie rock; indie pop
- Length: 3:39
- Label: Red Telephone Box
- Songwriters: Francis Healy; Douglas Payne; Holly Partridge
- Producer: Michael Ilbert

Travis singles chronology
"Song to Self" (2009)	"Where You Stand" (2013)	"Moving" (2013)

"Where You Stand" is a song by alternative rock band Travis, written by Dougie Payne, Holly Partridge and Fran Healy. It was released on 30 April 2013 as the lead single from the band's seventh studio album, Where You Stand.

== Music video ==
A music video for the song was released onto YouTube on 30 April 2013. The video was directed by Blair Young and Travis' lead singer Fran Healy, and cinematographed by David Liddell.

== Track listing ==
Digital download
No.	Title	Writer(s)	Length
1.	"Where You Stand"	Francis Healy, Douglas Payne, Holly Partridge	3:39

== Personnel ==
Travis

- Fran Healy – lead vocals, guitar
- Dougie Payne – bass guitar
- Andy Dunlop – guitar
- Neil Primrose – drums
