= Everything at Once (album) =

Studio album by Travis
- Released: 29 April 2016
- Recorded: December 2014 – October 2015
- Studio: Hansa Tonstudio, Berlin
- Genre: Post-Britpop, alternative rock, indie rock, soft rock
- Length: 33:17
- Label: Red Telephone Box
- Producer: Michael Ilbert

Travis chronology
Where You Stand (2013)	Everything at Once (2016)	10 Songs (2020)

Singles from Everything at Once
- 1. "Everything at Once" Released: 25 November 2015; 2. "3 Miles High" Released: 11 January 2016; 3. "Radio Song" Released: 17 April 2016; 4. "Magnificent Time" Released: 6 May 2016; 5. "What Will Come" Released: 25 May 2016; 6. "Animals" Released: 15 July 2016; 7. "Idlewild" Released: 23 September 2016; 8. "Paralysed" Released: 9 December 2016

Professional ratings
Aggregate scores
Source	Rating
Metacritic	60/100
Review scores
Source	Rating
AllMusic	4/5 stars
Clash	(7/10)

Everything at Once is the eighth studio album by the Scottish band Travis, the album was released on 29 April 2016. The band also made a movie for the album, which was included as a DVD in the deluxe version of the album. The movie premiered on 17 March 2016 at The Alamo Drafthouse Cinema as part of South by Southwest. The album has received mixed to positive reviews from music critics.

== Track listing ==
No.	Title	Writer(s)	Length
1.	"What Will Come"	Fran Healy	2:56
2.	"Magnificent Time"	Healy • Tim Rice-Oxley	2:50
3.	"Radio Song"	Healy	2:59
4.	"Paralysed"	Healy	2:49
5.	"Animals"	Dougie Payne	3:43
6.	"Everything at Once"	Payne	2:59
7.	"3 Miles High"	Healy • Aurora Aksnes	2:46
8.	"All of the Places"	Healy	3:31
9.	"Idlewild" (featuring Josephine Oniyama)	Healy • Oniyama	3:52
10.	"Strangers on a Train"	Andy Dunlop • Ali Ingle	4:52
Total length:			33:17

Japanese edition bonus tracks
No.	Title	Writer(s)	Length
11.	"Sing" (Live in Japan)	Healy	3:59
12.	"Closer" (Live in Japan)	Healy	5:00
Total length:			42:16

== Charts ==
Chart (2016)	Peak position
Austrian Albums (Ö3 Austria)	51
Belgian Albums (Ultratop Flanders)	64
Belgian Albums (Ultratop Wallonia)	143
French Albums (SNEP)	147
Irish Albums (IRMA)	58
Swiss Albums (Schweizer Hitparade)	20
UK Albums (OCC)	5
