= Parlour Tricks =

Pop band

- Origin: New York City
- Genres: indie pop, alternative rock,
- Years active: 2010–present
- Label: Bar/None Records
- Members: Lily Cato (songwriter, vocals); Darah Golub (vocals); Morgane Hollowell (vocals); Brian Kesley (bass)
- Past members: Angelo Spagnolo (guitar); Terry Moore (drums)
- Website: www.parlourtricksmusic.com

Parlour Tricks (previously Lily & the Parlour Tricks) are a pop band from New York City, originally composed of Lily Cato (lead vocalist and songwriter), Darah Golub and Morgane Hollowell (vocals), Angelo Spagnolo (guitar), Brian Kesley (bass and synth), and Terry Moore (drums). The band met in 2009 while studying at The New School for Jazz and Contemporary Music. They cite diverse musical influences including Nine Inch Nails, The Andrews Sisters, and Francis and the Lights, and lyrical inspiration including the novel The Goldfinch by Donna Tartt.

The band were named Best Pop Band in New York for 2014 by the Village Voice, and have performed at Bonnaroo, SXSW, Summerfest, and the CMJ and CBGB Festivals. As of March 2016 they are touring North America with Electric Six.

== Discography ==
=== Albums ===
- 2015: Broken Hearts/Bones (produced by Emery Dobyns)
- 2019: Sweetheart

=== Singles ===
- 2015: Lovesongs / Requiem
- 2015: The Storm
