= The Horse Shoe Bar =

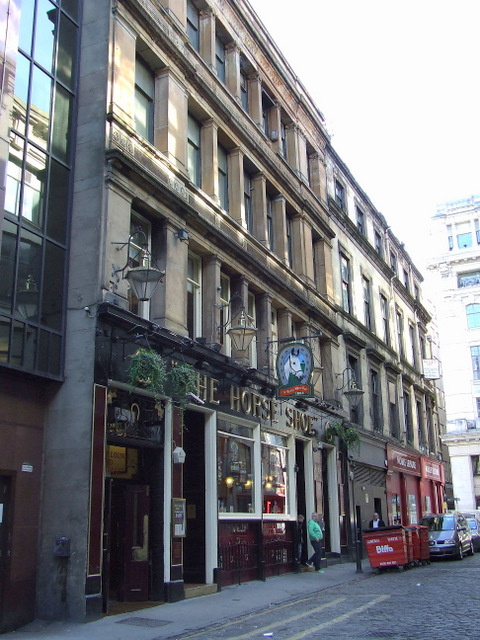
- The pub's exterior, 2012
- Interactive map of the The Horse Shoe Bar area

General information
- Type: Public house
- Location: Drury Street, Glasgow, Scotland
- Coordinates: 55.86098°N 4.25647°W

Website
- www.thehorseshoebarglasgow.co.uk

The Horse Shoe Bar (or Horseshoe Bar) is a public house on Drury Street, Glasgow, Scotland.

A bar opened on the site as far back as 1846 when William Turnbull, a local spirits dealer moved in to the premises. The licence changed several times in subsequent years before being taken over by John Scoullar in 1884. As part of his tenancy he renamed it The Horse Shoe Bar, in keeping with the equine names of his other bars. The pub is said to have the longest bar in Britain, measuring 104 feet (32 m).

In 1988 the building was listed as a Category A building of historic importance.

The bar was key in the formation of Glasgow band Travis. Drummer Neil Primrose was working behind the bar when he told his friend Fran Healy about a band called Glass Onion, who played in the bar. Healy saw them at the bar and subsequently joined them. They used the pub as a rehearsal space early in their career and a number of their gold discs are displayed in the pub.
