= The Man Who =

1999 album by Travis

Studio album by Travis
- Released: 24 May 1999
- Recorded: 1998–1999
- Studios: Abbey Road, Mayfair, RAK, Roundhouse (London, England); Chateau de la Rouge Motte (Normandy, France)
- Genre: Post-Britpop
- Length: 47:33
- Label: Independiente
- Producers: Nigel Godrich; Ian Grimble; Mike Hedges

Travis chronology
Good Feeling (1997)	The Man Who (1999)	The Invisible Band (2001)

Singles from The Man Who
- 1. "Writing to Reach You" Released: 8 March 1999; 2. "Driftwood" Released: 17 May 1999; 3. "Why Does It Always Rain on Me?" Released: 2 August 1999; 4. "Turn" Released: 8 November 1999

The Man Who is the second studio album by the Scottish rock band Travis. The album was released on 24 May 1999 through Independiente. It saw a change in musical direction for the band, moving away from the rockier tone of their debut Good Feeling (1997). Four singles were released: "Writing to Reach You", "Driftwood", and the top 10 hits "Why Does It Always Rain on Me?" and "Turn".

The Man Who initially received mixed reviews and sold slowly. Boosted by the success of "Why Does It Always Rain on Me?" and the band's appearance at the 1999 Glastonbury Festival, it eventually spent a total of 9 weeks at number one on the UK Albums Chart and brought the band international recognition, with retrospective reviews being more positive. As of 2018, according to Concord Music, The Man Who has sold over 3.5 million copies worldwide. It was among ten albums nominated for the best British album of the previous 30 years by the Brit Awards in 2010, losing to (What's the Story) Morning Glory? by Oasis.

== Background and recording ==
The Man Who was produced by Nigel Godrich and partially recorded at producer Mike Hedges's chateau in France. The majority of the songs were written before the band's debut album Good Feeling (1997) was released; "Writing to Reach You", "The Fear" and "Luv" were written around 1995–96, while "As You Are", "Turn" and "She's So Strange" date back as far as 1993 and the Glass Onion EP. The band continued recording at studios including RAK Studios and Abbey Road Studios in London. "[Good Feeling] was recorded with no trickery and it became this supposedly 'schizophrenic' record," said bass guitarist Dougie Payne. "[The Man Who] was recorded over six months in six different studios, using more instrumentation, and it's turned into this weirdly cohesive piece of work."

The title The Man Who is derived from the book The Man Who Mistook His Wife for a Hat (1985) by neurologist Oliver Sacks. The album's sleeve notes include a dedication to film director Stanley Kubrick, who had died a few months prior to the album's release.

== Reception ==
Professional ratings
Review scores
Source	Rating
AllMusic	4/5 stars
The Boston Phoenix	3.5/4 stars
Entertainment Weekly	A
The Guardian	3/5 stars
Los Angeles Times	3/4 stars
NME	6/10
Pitchfork	7.8/10
Rolling Stone	3.5/5 stars
USA Today	3.5/4 stars
The Village Voice	B−

The initial reception of The Man Who was mixed, with some publications that had previously praised the band's more rock-oriented album Good Feeling criticizing the shift towards melodic and melancholic material. Stuart Bailie of NME expressed dissatisfaction with the band's decision to move away from the "rowdy" elements of Good Feeling and create an album filled with ballads. Despite acknowledging some good songs, he suggested that Travis would be better off if they moved away from making sad classic records. Danny Eccleston of Q magazine noted that The Man Who loses its momentum after the first four songs, and the rest of the album is excessively tasteful, missing some of the enchanting qualities found in Good Feeling. However, Steve Lowe of Select found the album to showcase the band's ability to create pretty music, describing them as ordinary guys crafting extraordinary melodies and being good songwriters without trying too hard.

Although The Man Who initially appeared to follow the success of Good Feeling by entering the UK Albums Chart at number five, it faced a decline in the charts due to limited radio play of its singles and its lukewarm critical reception. However, the third single from the album, "Why Does It Always Rain on Me?", gained significant popularity and helped raise awareness of the band. Travis' performance of the song at the 1999 Glastonbury Festival, where rain began to fall as soon as the first line was sung, garnered media attention and increased word-of-mouth interest. Coupled with radio play of "Why Does It Always Rain on Me?" and the album's other singles, The Man Who eventually climbed back up the charts and reached the number one spot on the UK Albums Chart. It went on to become the third best-selling album of the year in the UK.

By the end of the year, the album's critical standing had improved dramatically. Select named The Man Who the best album of 1999, and the album also placed on the year-end lists of publications such as Melody Maker, Mojo, NME and Q. The Man Who won the award for Best Album at the 2000 Brit Awards, with Travis being named Best British Group. At the Ivor Novello Awards, Travis frontman Fran Healy won the awards for Best Songwriter(s) and Best Contemporary Song for "Why Does It Always Rain on Me?" The Man Who received a belated American release in early 2000, and the same year Travis undertook an extensive 237-gig world tour, including headlining the 2000 Glastonbury, T in the Park and V Festivals, and a US tour leg with Oasis.

== Legacy ==
In 2006, The Man Who was named the 70th greatest album of all time by Q. At the Brit Awards 2010, it was nominated for the Best Album of the Past 30 Years award, losing to Oasis's (What's the Story) Morning Glory? The album was included in the book 1001 Albums You Must Hear Before You Die. As of May 2016, The Man Who has sold 2,687,500 copies in the UK.

== Track listing ==
All tracks are written by Fran Healy, except where noted.

Standard edition
No.	Title	Length
1.	"Writing to Reach You"	3:41
2.	"The Fear"	4:12
3.	"As You Are"	4:14
4.	"Driftwood"	3:33
5.	"The Last Laugh of the Laughter"	4:20
6.	"Turn"	4:24
7.	"Why Does It Always Rain on Me?"	4:25
8.	"Luv"	4:55
9.	"She's So Strange"	3:15
10.	"Slide Show" ("Slide Show" ends at 3:34, and followed with hidden track "Blue Flashing Light" which starts at 6:48)	10:30

== Personnel ==
Travis

- Fran Healy – vocals, guitar, piano, harmonica
- Dougie Payne – bass guitar, backing vocals
- Andy Dunlop – guitar
- Neil Primrose – drums, percussion

Additional personnel

- Nigel Godrich – mixing, production
- Sally Herbert – string arrangement (tracks 2 and 10)
- Mike Hedges – production (tracks 6, 7 and 9)
- Ian Grimble – co-production (tracks 6, 7 and 9)
- Sarah Willson – cello (track 7)

== Charts and certifications ==
=== Weekly charts ===
Chart (1999–2000)	Peak position
Australian Albums (ARIA)	8
Austrian Albums (Ö3 Austria)	46
Canadian Albums (Billboard)	40
German Albums (Offizielle Top 100)	34
Irish Albums (IRMA)	2
New Zealand Albums (RMNZ)	14
Norwegian Albums (VG-lista)	18
Scottish Albums (Official Charts)	1
Swiss Albums (Schweizer Hitparade)	85
UK Albums (Official Charts)	1
US Billboard 200	135

=== Year-end charts ===
Chart (1999)	Position
UK Albums (OCC)	3
Chart (2000)	Position
Australian Albums (ARIA)	40
European Albums (Music & Media)	24
New Zealand Albums (RMNZ)	49
UK Albums (OCC)	14
Chart (2001)	Position
UK Albums (OCC)	142
Chart (2002)	Position
UK Albums (OCC)	155
Chart (2003)	Position
UK Albums (OCC)	194

=== All-time charts ===
Chart	Position
UK Albums (OCC)	43

=== Certifications ===
Region	Certification	Certified units/sales
Australia (ARIA)	Platinum	70,000^{^}
Canada (Music Canada)	Gold	50,000^{^}
United Kingdom (BPI)	9× Platinum	2,687,500
^{^} Shipments figures based on certification alone.
