= My Eyes (Travis song) =

Single by Travis

from the album The Boy with No Name
- B-side: "Chances, My Last Chance, Up The Junction"
- Released: 17 September 2007
- Recorded: 2006–2007
- Genre: Indie pop
- Length: 4:08
- Label: Independiente
- Songwriter(s): Fran Healy
- Producer(s): Nigel Godrich

Travis singles chronology
"Selfish Jean" (2007)	"My Eyes" (2007)	"J. Smith" (2008)

My Eyes is the third and final single released by Indie band Travis from their fifth studio album, The Boy with No Name. The song was released on 17 September 2007.

== Background ==
The track first appeared on a twelve-track sampler album given away free in The Mail on Sunday. Healy wrote the song the day after he found out he was to become a father. The lyrics of the song depict the moment when he found out. The video for the song shows the band in a water slide juxtaposed with a pregnant bride, who represent's Healy's wife, on her way to hospital to give birth. The song was also used in the "Wrath" episode of the TV show Smallville.

== Track listing ==
- UK CD Single
1. "My Eyes" - 4:12
2. "Chances" - 2:46
3. "My Eyes" (Video)
- 7" Vinyl #1
1. "My Eyes" - 4:12
2. "My Last Chance" - 3:18
- 7" Vinyl #2
1. "My Eyes" - 4:12
2. "Up The Junction" - 5:14
- European Single
1. "My Eyes" - 4:12
2. "Chances" - 2:46
3. "My Last Chance" - 3:18
4. "Up The Junction" - 5:14
5. "My Eyes" (Live) - 5:21

== Charts ==
Chart (2007)	Peak position
Scotland (OCC)	17
UK Singles (OCC)	60
