= Selfish Jean =

Single by Travis

from the album The Boy with No Name
- B-side: "You Bring Me Down", "Is That Love", "Pulling Mussels (from the Shell)"
- Released: 9 July 2007
- Recorded: 2006–2007
- Genre: Indie pop, pop rock
- Length: 4:00
- Label: Independiente
- Songwriter: Fran Healy
- Producer: Nigel Godrich

Travis singles chronology
"Closer" (2007)	"Selfish Jean" (2007)	"My Eyes" (2007)

"Selfish Jean" is a song by Scottish alternative rock band Travis, released as the second single from their fifth studio album, The Boy with No Name on 9 July 2007.

== Lyrics ==
The title of the song is a reference to The Selfish Gene, a popular science book about evolution by Richard Dawkins. The song was written by Fran Healy in 2005 in his apartment in New York, and was demoed using Healy's own computer. He sampled the drum intro from the Iggy Pop song "Lust For Life", looped it to create a basic rhythm, and then played the song and recorded vocals over the top of the rhythm track. The demo was then taken to Travis drummer Neil Primrose as an example of what to play, and thus, the song exists in its current form. The lyrics for the song's bridge are taken directly from an earlier B-side, "Standing On My Own", which appeared on the 1997 single "Tied to the 90's".

== Background ==
The single found its way onto the BBC Radio 2 playlist, receiving around twenty plays per week. Even though it charted at a relatively disappointing No. 30 on the UK singles chart, it is a song much loved by Travis fans and is performed at a majority of Travis concerts. B-sides for the single include the newly written song "You Bring Me Down", as well as two Squeeze covers—"Is That Love" and "Pulling Mussels (from the Shell)". It currently remains, as of 2022, their last UK Top 40 hit.

== Music video ==
The music video was released on the band's MySpace page before the release of The Boy with No Name. Directed by American comedian Demetri Martin, the video features Martin who begins by wearing 19 T-shirts with words and pictures to illustrate lyrics from the song, removing them to progressively reveal the T-shirts underneath. Some of these T-shirts have been recreated for sale: 'Aaaaahh... Selfish Jean', stretching from the back and rotating around to the front, and 'Art, Music, Jaffa Cakes', with additional tick boxes, which have been very popular among fans.

== Track listing ==
- UK CD Single
1. "Selfish Jean" - 4:00
2. "You Bring Me Down" - 3:23
3. "Selfish Jean" (Video)
- 7" Vinyl #1
1. "Selfish Jean" - 4:00
2. "Is That Love" - 4:18
- 7" Vinyl #2
1. "Selfish Jean" - 4:00
2. "Pulling Mussels (from the Shell)" - 2:43
- European Single
1. "Selfish Jean" - 4:00
2. "You Bring Me Down" - 3:23
3. "Is That Love" - 4:18
4. "Pulling Mussels (from the Shell)" - 2:43
5. "Selfish Jean" (Video)

== Charts ==
Chart (2007)	Peak position
Scottish Singles Sales (Official Charts)	8
UK Singles (Official Charts)	30
