= Where You Stand =

Studio album by Travis
- Released: 19 August 2013
- Recorded: January 2011 – June 2013
- Studio: Ocean Sound Recordings, Giske, Norway; Hansa Tonstudio, Berlin, Germany
- Genre: Post-Britpop, alternative rock, soft rock
- Length: 42:03
- Label: Red Telephone Box / Kobalt Label Services
- Producer: Michael Ilbert

Travis chronology
Ode to J. Smith (2008)	Where You Stand (2013)	Everything at Once (2016)

Singles from Where You Stand
- 1. "Where You Stand" Released: 30 April 2013; 2. "Moving" Released: 1 July 2013; 3. "Mother" Released: 4 November 2013

Where You Stand is the seventh studio album by the Scottish rock band Travis, released on 19 August 2013, on their own record label, Red Telephone Box via Kobalt Label Services. The album was produced by Michael Ilbert, and promoted by three singles: "Where You Stand", "Moving" and "Mother". It is the first album released by the band after a five-year break.

== Background ==
Where You Stand was the band's first new album in five years, as their sixth studio record Ode to J. Smith was released in 2008. Speaking about the band's departure from the spotlight, bassist Dougie Payne said of the release: "You stay away as long as it takes, so you feel that hunger and desire to get back to it same as you did at the start." It is also their first which all the members contributed on songwriting, rather than the vocalist Fran Healy, who served as the lyricist on their first six studio albums.

== Release and packaging ==
The album was released in a number of different versions:

- Standard digital release – containing eleven tracks, with registration to access all areas;
- Standard physical release – with eleven tracks, fourteen-page roll-fold booklet and registration to access all areas;
- Deluxe physical release – with thirteen tracks, including bonus tracks "Anniversary" and "Parallel Lines (Daydream)", plus DVD with the making of the album and 'Where You Stand' music video, and registration to access all areas;
- Heavyweight vinyl release – with eleven tracks, registration to access all areas and code for download version of the album;
- Super deluxe box set – including deluxe thirteen track CD album with bonus DVD, heavyweight vinyl release with 11 tracks, code for download version of the album, registration to access all areas, a vinyl sleeve signed by the band, 12" x 12" art photo of the band, T-shirt designed by Fran Healy, all kept in a collector's edition presentation box;
- Special Japanese deluxe edition – with exclusive bonus track "Ferris Wheel".

== Promotion ==
On 20 March 2013, the band released a song titled "Another Guy", together with a music video directed by Wolfgang Becker, as a teaser for the album.

Travis supported the release of Where You Stand with a number of live performances, including T in the Park on 13 July 2013, as well as at Sandown Park Racecourse on 24 July, and at V Festival on 17–18 August 2013, just two days before the album's release.

The album was also promoted by three singles. "Where You Stand" was released as the album's lead single on 30 April 2013. A music video for the song premiered on VEVO the same day. The single was accompanied by a shorter radio mix, which also used more orchestration on the chorus. "Moving" was released as the second single on 1 July 2013, together with an accompanying music video. The third and final single from the album, "Mother", was released on 4 November 2013. A music video for the song was released on 15 October 2013.

== Critical reception ==
Professional ratings
Aggregate scores
Source	Rating
Metacritic	70/100
Review scores
Source	Rating
AllMusic	4/5 stars
Clash	8/10
Consequence of Sound	3.5/5 stars
The Guardian	3/5 stars
The Independent	4/5 stars
The Daily Telegraph	3/5 stars
Slant Magazine	3/5 stars

Where You Stand received generally favorable reviews from music critics. At Metacritic, which assigns a normalized rating out of 100 to reviews from mainstream critics, the album received an average score of 70, based on 19 reviews.

== Track listing ==
No.	Title	Writer(s)	Length
1.	"Mother"	Healy, Payne, Dunlop, Primrose	3:58
2.	"Moving"	Payne	4:32
3.	"Reminder"	Healy	3:21
4.	"Where You Stand"	Payne, Holly Partridge, Healy	3:40
5.	"Warning Sign"	Healy	3:51
6.	"Another Guy"	Healy, Payne, Dunlop	3:41
7.	"A Different Room"	Payne	3:58
8.	"New Shoes"	Healy	3:33
9.	"On My Wall"	Payne	2:52
10.	"Boxes"	Healy, Dunlop	4:22
11.	"The Big Screen"	Healy, Dunlop	4:15
Total length:			42:03

Deluxe edition bonus tracks
No.	Title	Writer(s)	Length
12.	"Anniversary"	Healy	3:55
13.	"Parallel Lines"	Dunlop	3:49
Total length:			49:48

Japanese deluxe edition bonus tracks
No.	Title	Writer(s)	Length
12.	"Anniversary"	Healy	3:55
13.	"Parallel Lines"	Dunlop	3:49
14.	"Ferris Wheel"		3:03
Total length:			52:51

== Personnel ==
Travis

- Fran Healy – vocals, guitar, drums, programming, design, photography
- Dougie Payne – bass guitar, acoustic guitar, piano, programming, background vocals
- Andy Dunlop – guitar, piano, programming, background vocals
- Neil Primrose – drums

Additional personnel

- Michael Ilbert – production, mixing
- Tom Coyne – mastering
- Aya Merrill – assistant
- Nick Terry – assistant
- Nick Freemantle – photography
- Ian McAndrew – management

== Charts ==
Charts (2013)	Peak position
Austrian Albums (Ö3 Austria)	18
Belgian Albums (Ultratop Flanders)	53
Belgian Albums (Ultratop Wallonia)	35
Dutch Albums (Album Top 100)	46
French Albums (SNEP)	104
German Albums (Offizielle Top 100)	6
Irish Albums (IRMA)	63
Japanese Albums (Oricon)	25
Norwegian Albums (VG-lista)	16
Scottish Albums (OCC)	1
Spanish Albums (PROMUSICAE)	32
Swiss Albums (Schweizer Hitparade)	3
UK Albums (OCC)	3
US Billboard 200	100
US Independent Albums (Billboard)	21
US Top Rock Albums (Billboard)	30

== Release history ==
Region	Date	Format	Label	Edition
Japan	14 August 2013	CD, digital download	Universal Japan	Japanese edition
United Kingdom	19 August 2013	CD, digital download	Red Telephone Box via Kobalt Label Services	Standard, Deluxe
