= Emery Dobyns =

American record producer and songwriter

Emery Dobyns is an American recording engineer, record producer, and songwriter, formerly based in Manhattan in New York City, but now based in Nashville.

Dobyns won a Grammy Award for engineering Beauty & Crime by Suzanne Vega.

He has recorded and mixed for the likes of Sia, Lou Reed, Antony & The Johnsons, and Battles. He has produced, recorded and mixed albums by Patti Smith, Noah & The Whale, Travis, Mt. Desolation, Chief, Parlour Tricks, Better Than Ezra, and Fran Healy. Other artists he has worked with include Leona Naess, Young Rival, Black Crowes, O.D.B., P. Diddy, Mary J. Blige, and Scarlett Johansson.

His work has accumulated over 600,000,000 streams to date.

In 2024 he began working with Hammock (band) as a mixer, mixing 'From The Void' and 'Nevertheless'

He recently collaborated with Sam Hollander, co-writing "A Better Song" for Trombone Shorty for the 'Jam Van' YouTube series created by Bill Sherman.

Dobyns produced and mixed "The Masked Singer EP" for Jewel (singer).

He co-produced the latest album from Better Than Ezra, Super Magick.

His songs and productions have been heard on TV shows such as "Lucifer", American Horror Story, Nancy Drew (2019 TV series), Batwoman (TV series), Virgin River (TV series), Into the Dark (TV series), Grey's Anatomy, Legends of Tomorrow, Sacred Lies, Roswell (TV series), Shades of Blue (TV series) and others. Ad placements include Ford Motor Company and Chromebook.

Selected songs include "Roots" with Morgxn, "Tell That Devil" (featured as the Wynonna Earp (TV series) theme song and on Nashville (2012 TV series), "Alone Together" (with Jamie Lidell and featured on Grey's Anatomy) and "Hold The Phone" (with Tor Miller.)

He also has several musical projects with Samuel Dixon in which he co-writes and sings.
