= Travis (band) =

Scottish rock band

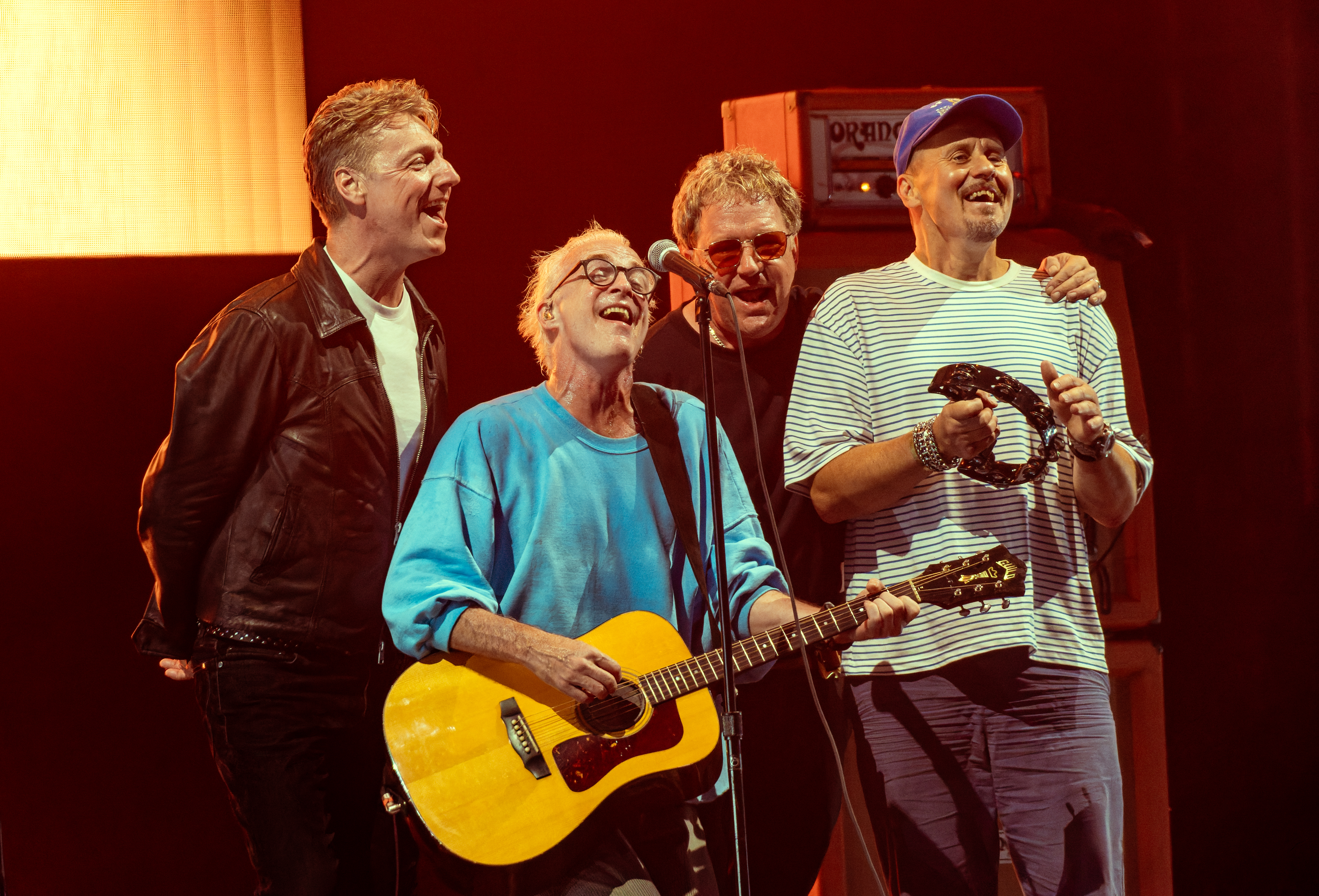
- Travis performing at Victorious Festival 2025; L to R: Dougie Payne, Fran Healy, Andy Dunlop, Neil Primrose

Background information
- Also known as: Glass Onion
- Origin: Glasgow, Scotland
- Genres: Post-Britpop; pop rock; alternative rock; soft rock; Britpop (early)
- Years active: 1990–present
- Labels: Red Telephone Box; Virgin Music; Independiente; Epic Records; Kobalt; BMG
- Members: Andy Dunlop; Fran Healy; Dougie Payne; Neil Primrose
- Past members: Geoff Martyn; Chris Martyn; Simon Jarvis; Catherine Maxwell
- Website: travisonline.com

Travis are a Scottish rock band formed in Glasgow in 1990, and composed of Fran Healy (lead vocals, rhythm guitar, piano), Dougie Payne (bass guitar, backing vocals), Andy Dunlop (lead guitar, banjo, backing vocals) and Neil Primrose (drums, percussion). The band's name comes from the character Travis Henderson (played by Harry Dean Stanton) from the film Paris, Texas (1984). The band released their debut album, Good Feeling (1997), to moderate success where it debuted at number nine on the UK Albums Chart and was later awarded a silver certification from the British Phonographic Industry (BPI) in January 2000.

The band gained greater success with their second album, The Man Who (1999), which spent nine weeks at number one on the UK Albums Chart, totalling 134 weeks in the top 100 of the chart. In 2003, The Man Who was certified 9× platinum by the BPI, which represented sales of over 2.68 million in the UK alone. After that success, the band released their third album, The Invisible Band (2001). It matched the track record of The Man Who, debuting atop the UK Albums Chart as well as peaking at thirty-nine on the US Billboard 200. A year after the release of The Invisible Band, the BPI awarded Travis with a 4× platinum certification for the album. Further releases, 12 Memories (2003), The Boy with No Name (2007), Ode to J. Smith (2008), Where You Stand (2013), Everything at Once (2016), 10 Songs (2020), and L.A. Times (2024) also achieved commercial success. In 2004, the band released their first greatest hits album, Singles.

Travis have twice been awarded best band at the Brit Awards and were awarded the NME Artist of the Year award at NME's 2000 ceremony, and in 2016 were honoured at the Scottish Music Awards for their outstanding contribution to music.

== History ==
=== Formation and early years (1989–1993) ===
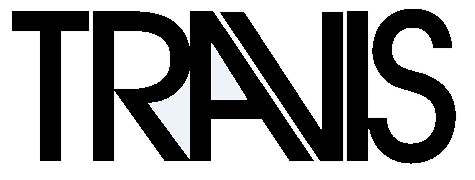
The Travis logo has been used by the band since The Man Who in 1999. It is on all releases with the exception of Good Feeling (which was released in 1997) and Ode to J. Smith (which featured a comparison between Gill Sans and Johnston Sans).

Both Fran Healy and Andy Dunlop went to the Glasgow School of Art from 1989 to 1991. A 16 year old Healy played in front of a crowd for the first time in 1989 at Holyrood Secondary School when he was in 5th year. The band that would become Travis was formed by brothers Chris Martyn (bass) and Geoff Martyn (keyboards) along with Simon Jarvis (drums). Andy Dunlop, a school friend at Lenzie Academy, was drafted in on guitar. The line-up was completed by a female vocalist, Catherine Maxwell, and the band's name became "Glass Onion", after the Beatles' song of the same name. Neil Primrose then joined to replace drummer Jarvis. Parting company with their singer in the spring of 1991, they auditioned for a new vocalist. Having met each other through Primrose pouring him a pint, an untrained art student, Healy, joined after being invited to audition by Primrose. Healy joined the band on the day he enrolled at the Glasgow School of Art in the autumn of 1991. In 1993, with the option of playing music holding more appeal, Healy dropped out of art school and, inspired by songwriters such as Joni Mitchell, assumed songwriting responsibilities. With brothers Chris and Geoff Martyn on bass and keyboards, in 1993, the five-some released a privately made CD, The Glass Onion EP, featuring the tracks "Dream On", "The Day Before", "Free Soul", and "Whenever She Comes Round". 500 copies of the EP were made and were recently valued at £1000 each. Other songs they recorded, but were left off the CD, are "She's So Strange" and "Not About to Change".

The band won a talent contest organised by the Music in Scotland Trust, which promised £2,000 so that Travis could deal-hunt at a new music seminar in New York. Two weeks before they were due to leave, however, the prize was instead given to the Music in Scotland Trust Directory. According to their publisher, Charlie Pinder: "They were a band that everyone in the A&R community knew about and would go and see every now and then. But they weren't very good. They had quite good songs; Fran always did write good songs." While on a visit to Scotland, American engineer and producer Niko Bolas, a long-time Neil Young and Rolling Stones associate, tuned into a Travis session on Radio Scotland, and heard something in the band's music which instantly made him travel to Perth to see them. Healy said: "He told us we were shit, took us in the studio for four days, and taught us how to play properly, like a band. He was ballsy, rude, and New York pushy. He didn't believe my lyrics and told me to write what I believed in and not tell lies. He was Mary Poppins, he sorted us out." The band recorded a five-song demo, which included the song "All I Want to Do Is Rock".

=== Changes and debut album (1994–1997) ===
Having failed to achieve breakthrough success in the United Kingdom, the band relocated to New York, as they believed that the American music market might be more suited to their style of music. Before heading to New York, Healy suggested that the band should send a demo to Charlie Pinder of Sony Music Publishing, whom they had known for a few years and regularly sent songs to, saying: "If he's not into it, then we'll [leave]." Pinder was immediately impressed by the song "All I Want to Do is Rock", which he felt was a dramatic change for the band: "It was harder, more exciting, sexy; all things that they never really were. They [had] turned a corner." After performing a secret gig for Pinder and his boss at Sony, Blair McDonald, they were signed to Sony Music Publishing. The immediate impact was that the founding member and keyboard player Geoff Martyn was removed while the bassist, his brother Chris, was replaced with Healy's best friend Dougie Payne. The band was moved to London where they were given a rehearsal room and a house.

Payne, who had not played bass guitar before, joined the band in 1994 after having completed a crash course of a couple of weeks. Payne played with the new line-up for the first time in a free space above The Horse Shoe Bar in Glasgow.

Once set up in London, the band spent between nine months and a year recording new songs. They played their first London show at the Dublin Castle in Camden. With about twenty good songs ready, they approached managers Colin Lester and Ian McAndrew of Wildlife Entertainment who then introduced the band to Andy MacDonald, owner of Go! Discs Records and founder of Independiente Records.

=== Mainstream success (1998–2001) ===
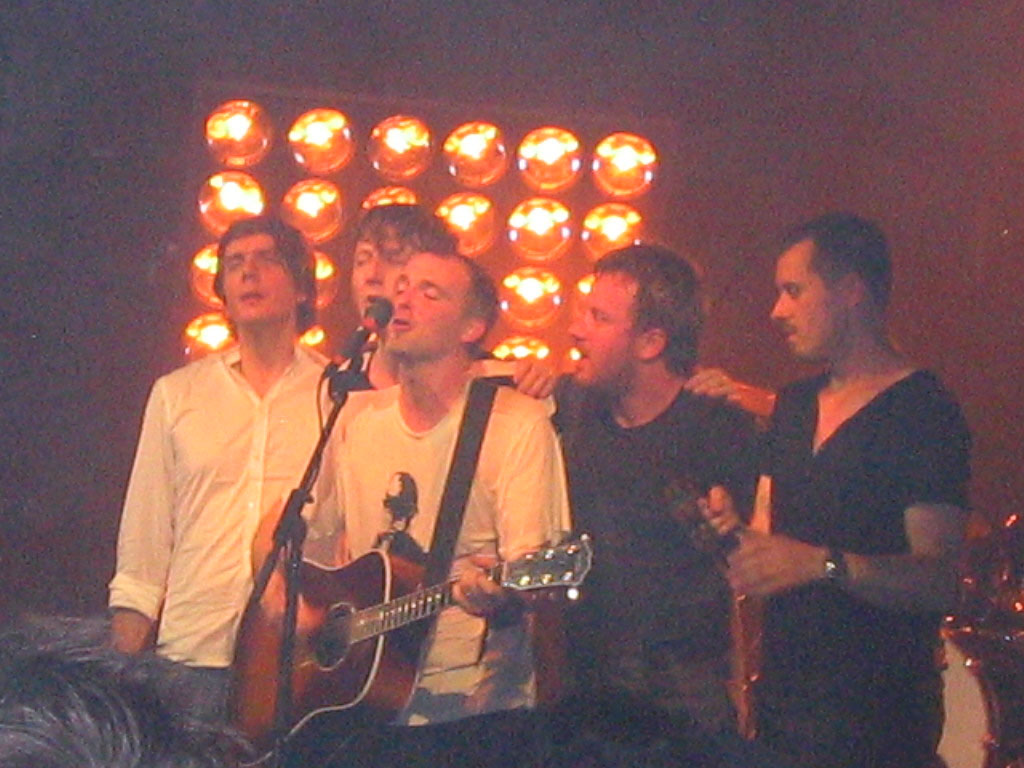
Travis performing live on stage together as a group

Travis' second album, 1999's The Man Who, was produced by Nigel Godrich and partially recorded at producer Mike Hedges' chateau in France. The band continued recording at, among other studios, Abbey Road Studios in London. The title The Man Who is derived from the book The Man Who Mistook His Wife for a Hat (1985) by neurologist Oliver Sacks. The album's sleeve notes include a dedication to film director Stanley Kubrick, who had died a few months prior to the album's release.

Shortly after release, The Man Who initially looked as though it would mirror the release of Good Feeling. Although it entered the UK Albums Chart at No. 7, with little radio play of its singles, it quickly slipped down. Worse, many critics who had raved about the rocky Good Feeling criticised the album for the band's move into more melodic, melancholic material. NME commented on the release of the album: "Travis will be best when they stop trying to make sad, classic records".

Increased radio airplay of the single "Why Does It Always Rain on Me?" raised awareness of the band and resulted in The Man Who gaining in the charts. "Why Does It Always Rain on Me?" became a commercial success for the band, reaching number one on the UK Rock & Metal Singles Charts, number four in their native Scotland, number ten in the United Kingdom, and the top twenty in Australia, Finland, and New Zealand. As of 2018, according to Concord Music, The Man Who has sold over 3.5 million copies worldwide. It was among ten albums nominated for the best British album of the previous 30 years by the Brit Awards in 2010, losing to (What's the Story) Morning Glory? by Oasis. Travis followed the release of The Man Who with an extensive 237-concert world tour, including headlining the 2000 Glastonbury, T in the Park, and V festivals, and a US tour leg with Oasis.

The title of Travis's following album, 2001's The Invisible Band, again produced by Nigel Godrich, reflects the band's genuine belief that their music is more important than the group behind it. Recorded at Ocean Way Studios in Los Angeles, and featuring songs including "Sing" (the most played song on British radio that summer), "Side", the McCartneyesque "Flowers in the Window", "Indefinitely", "Pipe Dreams", and "The Cage", the album made it to No. 1 on the UK chart and generally received widespread critical acclaim, with the band again taking Best British Band at the annual Brit Awards. It also received Top of the Pops' Album of the Year. The album also had an impact across the Atlantic, the popularity in the US of the single "Coming Around", a non-album track with Byrdsesque harmonies and 12-string guitar, enhancing this.

=== Primrose's accident and change in direction (2002–2006) ===
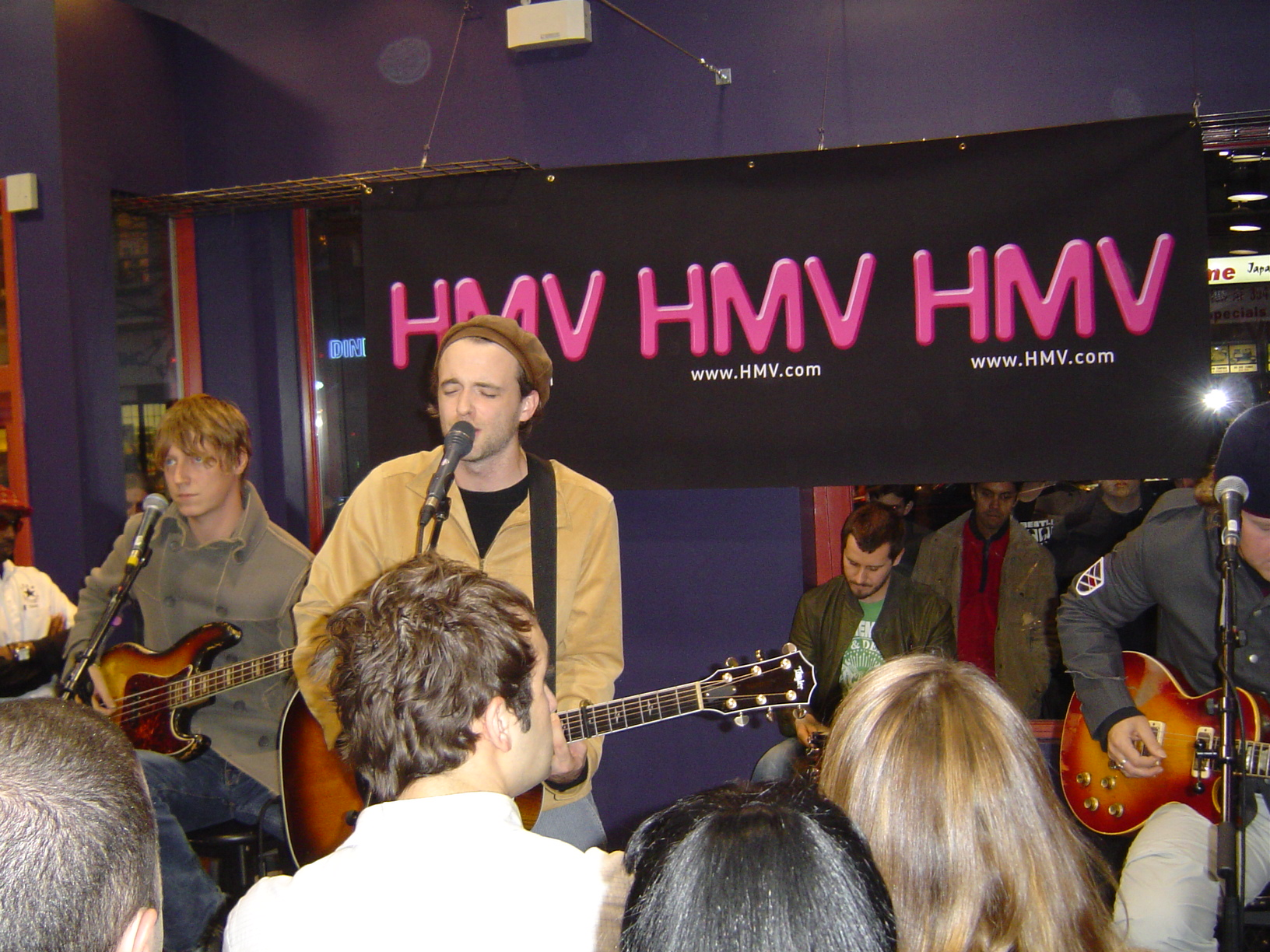
Travis performing live at an HMV store in Toronto, Canada, 2003

In 2002, drummer Neil Primrose suffered a serious injury after he dived head-first into a shallow swimming pool while on tour in France, just after a concert at the Eurockéennes festival. Breaking his neck, he almost died due to spinal damage. If not for his road crew, he also would have drowned. Despite the severity of the accident, Primrose has since made a full recovery.

With Primrose having recovered, Travis regrouped and re-evaluated. Moving into a cottage in Crear, Argyll and Bute, they set up a small studio, and over two weeks came up with nine new songs that would form the basis of their fourth studio album, 2003's 12 Memories. Produced by Travis themselves, Tchad Blake, and Steve Orchard, the album marked a move into more organic, moody, and political territory for the band. The album's lead single "Re-Offender" was a commercial success for the band, reaching number seven in both Scotland and the United Kingdom. 12 Memories was also a commercial success, reaching number three in the United Kingdom and forty one in the United States.

In 2004, Travis embarked on a successful tour of Canada, the US, and Europe (supported by Keane in the UK), and in November 2004 the band released a successful compilation of their singles, Singles, as well as the new tracks, "Walking in the Sun" and "The Distance" (written by Dougie Payne). On 2 July 2005, Travis performed at Live 8's London concert, and four days later at the Edinburgh 50,000 – The Final Push concert. Travis also participated in Band Aid 20's re-recording of "Do They Know It's Christmas?"—Healy and friend Nigel Godrich playing leading roles in its organisation.

=== Artistic re-evaluation (2007–2009) ===
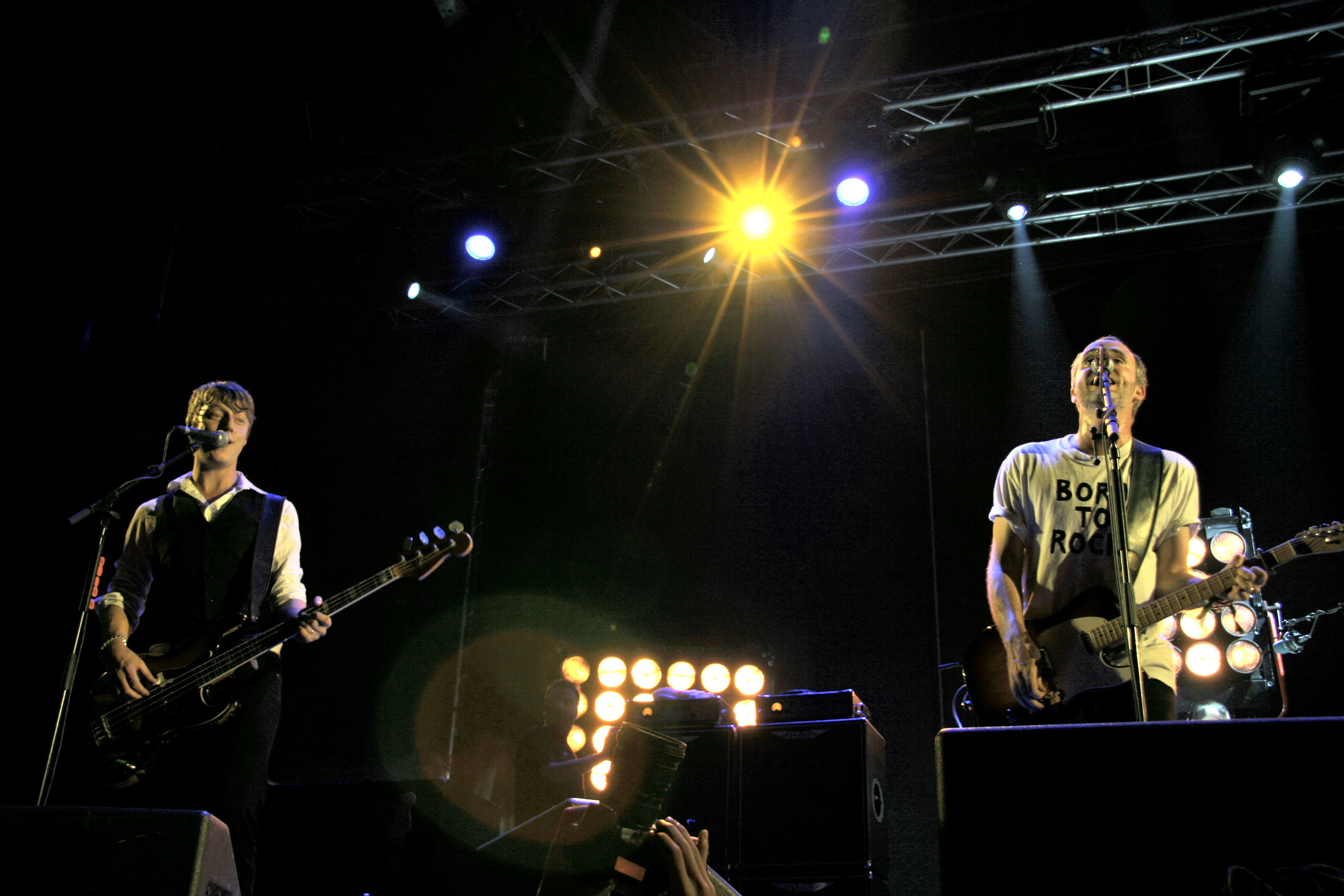
Travis performing live on stage at the SEC Centre in Glasgow, September 2007

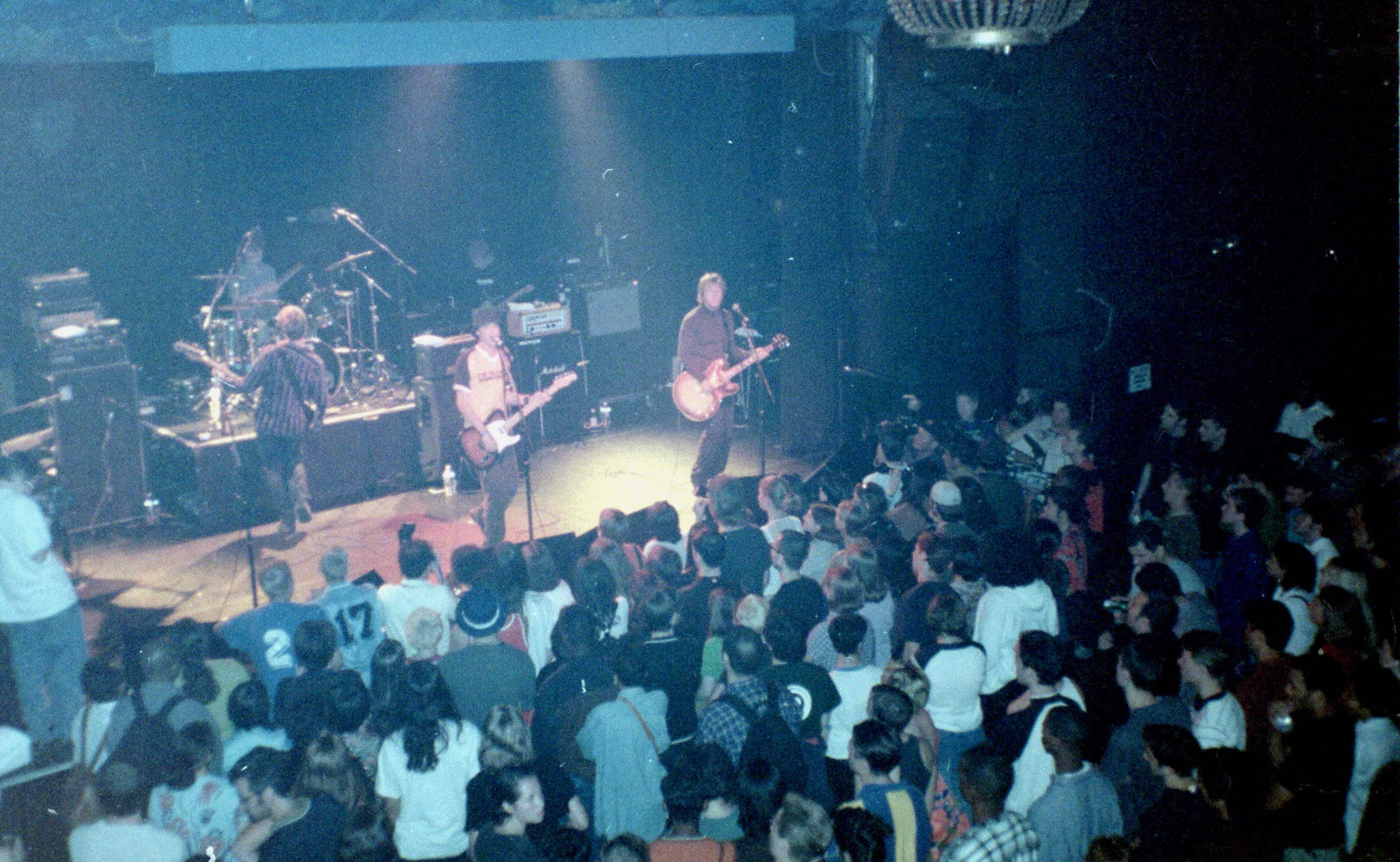
Travis performing live in 2008

Travis released a fifth studio album, The Boy with No Name, on 7 May 2007. Nigel Godrich was the album's executive producer, while Mike Hedges and Brian Eno were also involved. The album is named after Healy's son, Clay, whom Healy and his partner Nora were unable to name until four weeks after his birth. Healy has described the process of making the album as "like coming out of the forest". Travis played at Coachella on 28 April 2007. At the Virgin Megastore tent in the festival, The Boy With No Name was available to purchase over a week early. Reviews of the album were mixed. The album's first single, "Closer", was released on 23 April 2007 and peaked at No. 10 on the UK singles chart. Two further singles were released from The Boy with No Name – "Selfish Jean" and "My Eyes".

After a brief tour of the United Kingdom, during which the band tested new material, they recorded their sixth album, in two weeks between February–March 2008, having been inspired by the speed and simplicity of their recent recording session with Beatles engineer Geoff Emerick while participating in a BBC programme celebrating the 40th Anniversary of the Sgt. Pepper's Lonely Hearts Club Band album. It was announced around this time that the band and their long-term record label Independiente had split amicably.

In early June 2008, a vinyl EP of the song "J. Smith" was announced online as the first release from Ode to J. Smith, for 30 June. It was an EP limited to 1000 copies and not an 'official' single; instead more of a taster of the album for fans. Fran Healy said, "The album is called Ode to J. Smith partly giving a heads up to the key song and partly because all the songs are written about nameless characters or to nameless characters." He has also described the album as a novel with 12 chapters, with each chapter being a song.

The album was released through their own record label, Red Telephone Box, with the lead single "Something Anything" being released on 15 September. On 29 September, Ode to J. Smith was released. Travis headlined a 12-concert UK tour to coincide with the releases between 22 September and 8 October. Early reviews were very positive, with some calling it Travis's best record ever. The second single released from Ode To J. Smith was "Song to Self", on 5 January 2009.

=== Return to prominence (2010–2016) ===
A live acoustic album featuring Healy and Dunlop was released on 19 January 2010. In 2011, Travis returned to live performances. They played at the Maxidrom Festival in Moscow, in May; at G! festival, Faroe Island, and the Rock'n Coke Festival in Istanbul, Turkey, in July. On 31 October, Fran Healy performed a concert in Berlin along with Keane's Tim Rice-Oxley. Travis recorded songs for their next album at the end of September 2011, and they continued writing new songs in February 2012 with Tim Rice–Oxley of Keane, in both Berlin and London.

A pre single teaser track called "Another Guy", from the band's forthcoming seventh album, was released as a free download from the band's official website on 20 March 2013. On 25 April 2013, they revealed that the new album Where You Stand would be released on 19 August 2013 via Kobalt Label Services, and that the first eponymous single "Where You Stand" would be released on 30 April. A post from Travis on their Instagram page confirmed that recording had commenced on the band's eighth album at Hansa Tonstudio in Berlin in January 2015. On 25 November 2015, Travis shared a free-download single "Everything at Once" and announced two UK live shows for January 2016. A new album, also titled Everything at Once, was released on 29 April 2016. In 2016, at the 18th annual Scottish Music Awards, Travis were presented with an award for their outstanding contribution to music.

Travis's June 2016 tour of Mexico formed the backdrop for Almost Fashionable: A Film About Travis, a documentary directed by Healy. The film stars Wyndham Wallace, a music journalist and acquaintance of Healy's in Berlin, who was invited to travel with Travis to Mexico because he had previously expressed his distaste for the band. The film had its premiere in 2018 at the 72nd Edinburgh International Film Festival, where it won the Audience Award.

=== 10 Songs (2017–2024) ===
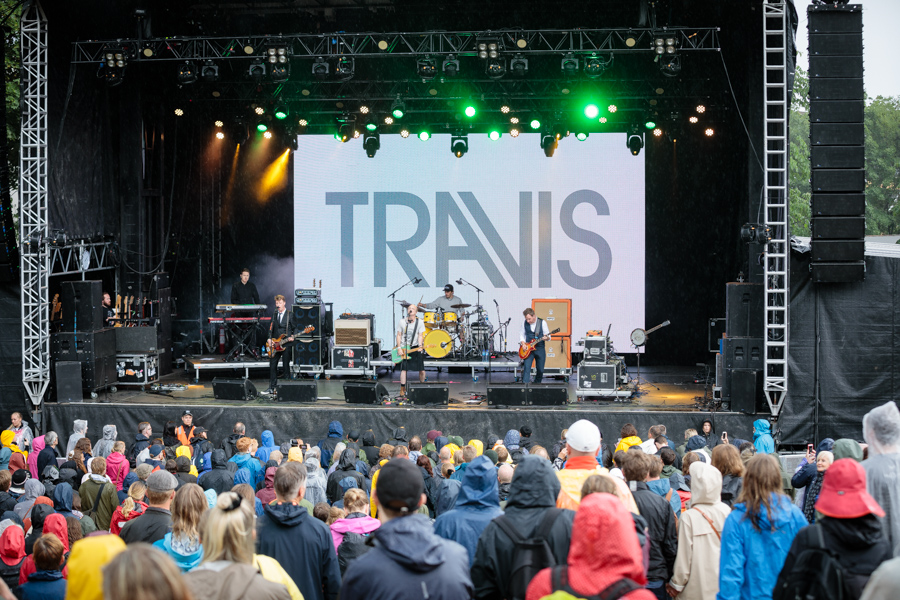
Travis performing in 2018

In 2017, Travis celebrated the 20th anniversary of their debut 1997 album Good Feeling and the 18th anniversary of their seminal 1999 album The Man Who. As part of the occasion, the band re-released the album The Man Who as a limited edition box set. In September 2017, the band also performed the album in full at two shows in Manchester and London, followed by more full-album UK shows in June and December 2018.

For the 20th anniversary of The Man Who, the band re-released the album reissue box set, along with the live album Live at Glastonbury '99, a recording of the set that is credited to be "a pivotal moment in kickstarting Travis' commercial success", this being despite the band members feeling that they had performed poorly when they originally performed at Glastonbury in 1999.

On 10 December 2019, Travis released "Kissing in the Wind", a song from their upcoming new album, a song that had previously been included in their 2018 documentary Almost Fashionable: A Film About Travis. Another single, "A Ghost", was released on 3 June 2020, along with details of the band's upcoming ninth studio album 10 Songs, released on 9 October of the same year. As a result of the outbreak of the COVID-19 pandemic, the band were unable to schedule a tour to promote the release of 10 Songs; however, when restrictions were lifted, they rarely played any of the tracks from the album live. On 17 July 2022, the group supported Gerry Cinnamon at his concert at Hampden Park in Glasgow.

=== L.A. Times (2024–present) ===
On 20 March 2024, Travis debuted the singles "Gaslight" and "Bus", and announced their tenth studio album, L.A. Times, which was released on 12 July 2024. The album was produced by Tony Hoffer and written by Fran Healy in his studio on the edge of Skid Row, Los Angeles. The cover of the album is a photograph of the band in Los Angeles taken by Stefan Ruiz, who also took photographs for the covers of the previous albums The Man Who, The Invisible Band, and The Boy with No Name.

The band announced they would be supporting the Killers on their seventeen-concert Ireland and UK tour in mid-2024.

== Other endeavors ==
The band have played with a number of other artists including Paul McCartney, Graham Nash, Noel Gallagher and Jason Falkner. Travis guest-starred on Feeder's "Tumble and Fall", performing backing vocals at the end of the song due to the fact that when Feeder recorded their album Pushing the Senses, Travis was in the next studio.

An adaptation of the Oasis song "Half the World Away", as performed by Healy, was used as the intro music for a sketch in The Adam and Joe Show entitled "The Imperial Family". The sketch itself was a parody of The Royle Family (the Oasis song lends itself to it as the theme music). In June 2007, Travis participated in BBC Radio 2's project to celebrate the 40th anniversary of the Beatles' Sgt. Pepper's Lonely Hearts Club Band. All of the album's tracks were re-recorded by contemporary artists, supervised by the original engineer, Geoff Emerick, using the same four-track studio equipment. Travis contributed a rendition of "Lovely Rita". The band wanted to be as faithful to the original as possible, to the extent they recorded the guitars in the stairwell of Abbey Road Studios to recreate the acoustics.

In 2010, Travis contributed a live version of their song "Before You Were Young" to the Enough Project and Downtown Records' Raise Hope for Congo compilation. Proceeds from the compilation fund efforts to make the protection and empowerment of Congo's women a priority, as well as inspire individuals around the world to raise their voice for peace in the Congo. Healy released his first solo album, entitled Wreckorder, in October 2010. Recorded in Berlin, New York, and Vermont, and produced by Emery Dobyns (Patti Smith, Noah and the Whale), the album features Paul McCartney, Neko Case, and Tom Hobden of Noah and the Whale.

== Band members ==
Current members

- Andy Dunlop – lead guitar, banjo, backing vocals (1990–present)
- Neil Primrose – drums, percussion (1990–present)
- Fran Healy – lead vocals, rhythm guitar, piano (1991–present)
- Dougie Payne – bass guitar, backing & co-lead vocals (1994–present)

Former members

- Geoff Martyn – keyboards (1990–96)
- Chris Martyn – bass guitar (1990–94)
- Simon Jarvis – drums, percussion (1990)
- Catherine Maxwell – lead vocals (1990–91)

== Discography ==
- Good Feeling (1997)
- The Man Who (1999)
- The Invisible Band (2001)
- 12 Memories (2003)
- The Boy with No Name (2007)
- Ode to J. Smith (2008)
- Where You Stand (2013)
- Everything at Once (2016)
- 10 Songs (2020)
- L.A. Times (2024)

== Filmography ==
- More Than Us (2002)
- Travis at the Palace (2004)
- Singles (2004)
- Almost Fashionable: A Film About Travis (2018)

== Concert tours ==
- Good Feeling Tour (1997–98)
- Rolling Stone Road-show 1999 Tour (1999)
- the Man Who Tour (1999–2000)
- the Invisible Band Tour (2001–02)
- 12 Memories Tour (2003–04)
- Singles Tour (2004)
- the Boy with No Name Tour (2007)
- Ode to J. Smith Tour (2008–09)
- A Chronological Acoustical Journey Through the Travis Back Catalogue Tour (2009)
- Where You Stand Tour (2013–14)
- Everything at Once Tour (2016–17)
- the Man Who Live 2018 Tour (2018)
- the Invisible Band 20th Anniversary Tour (2022)
- L.A. Times Promo Tour (2024)
- Raze the Bar Tour (2024–25)

== Legacy ==
The band are credited by the media for paving the way for bands including Coldplay to achieve worldwide success throughout the 2000s, particularly with the success of The Man Who.

== Awards & nominations ==
Brit Awards

The Brit Awards are the British Phonographic Industry's annual pop music awards.

Year	Nominee / work	Award	Result
1998	Travis	British Breakthrough Act	Nominated
2000	Travis	British Group	Won
2000	The Man Who	British Album of the Year	Won
2000	"Why Does It Always Rain on Me?"	British Single of the Year	Nominated
2001	"Coming Around"	British Video of the Year	Nominated
2002	Travis	British Group	Won
2002	The Invisible Band	British Album of the Year	Nominated
2002	"Sing"	British Video of the Year	Nominated

Q Awards

The Q Awards are the United Kingdom's annual music awards run by the music magazine Q.

Year	Nominee / work	Award	Result
1999	Travis	Best New Act	Nominated
1999	The Man Who	Best Album	Nominated
1999	"Why Does It Always Rain on Me?"	Best Single	Won
2000	Travis	Best Act in the World Today	Won
2000	Travis	Best Live Act	Nominated
2000	"Coming Around"	Best Video	Nominated
2001	Travis	Best Act in the World Today	Nominated
2001	The Invisible Band	Best Album	Won
