= Andy Dunlop =

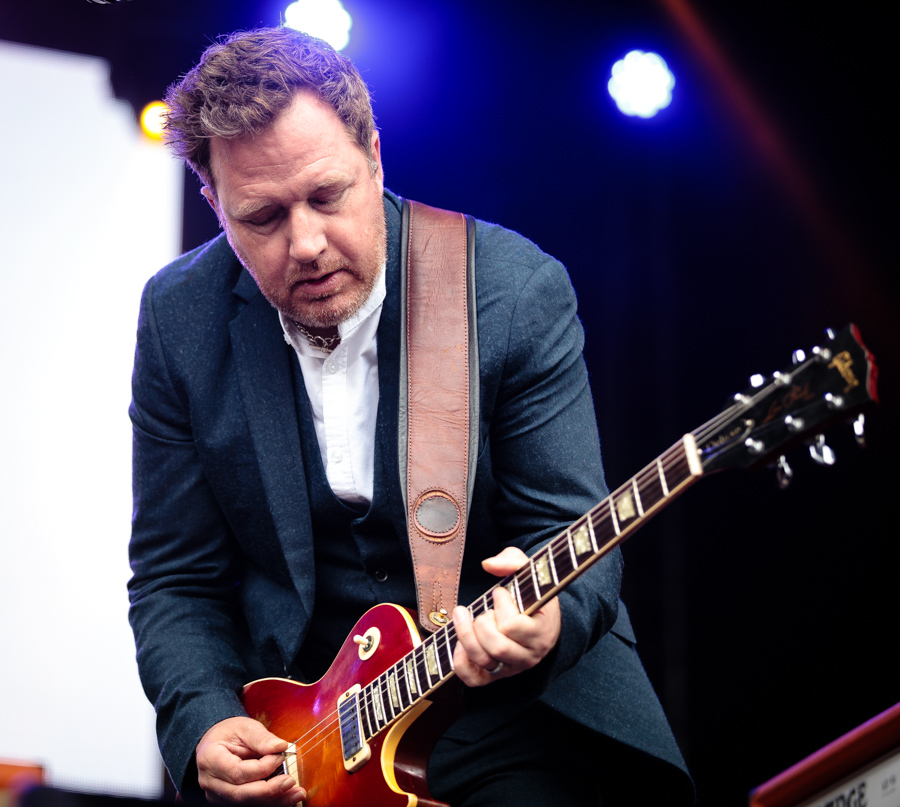
- Andy Dunlop performing in 2018

Background information
- Born: 16 March 1972 (age 54)
- Origin: Lenzie, Dunbartonshire, Scotland
- Genres: Alternative rock Britpop; Rock
- Occupation: Musician
- Instruments: Guitar, banjo, piano, accordion
- Years active: 1990–present
- Member of: Travis

Andrew Dunlop (born 16 March 1972) is a Scottish musician and the lead guitarist of Scottish indie band Travis.

== Biography ==
Dunlop attended Lenzie Academy. The band Travis got their break with the album The Man Who, named after a bestselling book. The album was internationally successful, and became the biggest selling album in the UK in 1999.

As well as being the guitarist, Dunlop has also contributed several songs. "You Don't Know What I'm Like", "Ancient Train" (both featuring Dunlop on lead vocals), "Central Station" and "The Sea" (with Fran Healy taking lead vocals). For their sixth album, Ode to J. Smith, Dunlop contributed "Quite Free", which he co-wrote with Fran Healy and Dougie Payne. Also on Travis' fifth album The Boy with No Name he co-wrote "3 Times and You Lose" and "Big Chair". Dunlop continues to write songs and delivered songs like "Boxes", "The Big Screen" and "Parallel Lines" for the album "Where You Stand".

Together with Guy Berryman and Will Champion of Coldplay, Dunlop contributed to the first solo album of a-ha keyboardist Magne Furuholmen entitled Past Perfect Future Tense.

Dunlop is known for the long fingernails on his right hand which he uses instead of picks, much like a flamenco guitarist. Dunlop is married to Jo Monaghan. In December 2005 the couple's first child, a son, was born, named Dylan Green Dunlop.
