= A discography =

- Studio albums: 5
- Extended plays: 1
- Live albums: 1
- Singles: 16

The discography of A, a British alternative rock band, currently consists of five studio albums, one live album, one extended play (EP) and sixteen singles.

== Albums ==
=== Studio albums ===
List of studio albums, with selected details, chart positions and certifications
| Title | Details | Peak chart positions | | | | Certifications |
| Title | Details | UK | AUT | GER | SWI | Certifications |
|---|---|---|---|---|---|---|
| How Ace Are Buildings (Note: Released only in the United Kingdom.) | Released: 29 July 1997; Label: London (#828 916-2); Format: CD, 2xLP, cassette | — | — | — | — | |
| 'A' vs. Monkey Kong | Released: 16 August 1999; Label: London (#3984 27695 2); Format: CD, LP | 62 | — | 81 | — | |
| Hi-Fi Serious | Released: 4 March 2002; Label: London (#0927-44776-2); Format: CD, CD+DVD, LP, cassette | 18 | 39 | 29 | 42 | BPI: Silver |
| Teen Dance Ordinance | Released: 25 June 2005; Label: London (#5046785852); Format: CD | 95 | — | — | — | |
| Prang | Released: 22 May 2026; Label: Cooking Vinyl (COOK973); Format: CD, LP, cassette | 42 | — | — | — | |
"—" denotes a recording that did not chart or was not released in that territory.

=== Live albums ===
List of live albums, with selected details
| Title | Details |
|---|---|
| Exit Stage Right | Released: 8 August 2000; Label: London (#8573 83098 2); Format: CD |

== Extended plays ==
List of extended plays, with selected details
| Title | Details |
|---|---|
| Rockin' Like Dokken | Released: 2003; Label: Warner Bros.; Format: CD |

== Singles ==
List of singles, with selected chart positions, showing year released and album name
| Title | Year | Peak chart positions | | | | | | Album |
| Title | Year | UK | AUS | BEL | GER | SWE | SWI | Album |
|---|---|---|---|---|---|---|---|---|
| "5 in the Morning" | 1995 | — | — | — | — | — | — | How Ace Are Buildings |
| "House Under the Ground" | 1996 | — | — | — | — | — | — | How Ace Are Buildings |
| "Bad Idea" | 1997 | 170 | — | — | — | — | — | How Ace Are Buildings |
| "Foghorn" | 1998 | 63 | — | — | — | — | — | How Ace Are Buildings |
| "Number One" | 1998 | 47 | — | — | — | — | — | How Ace Are Buildings |
| "Sing-a-Long" | 1998 | 57 | — | — | — | — | — | How Ace Are Buildings |
| "Summer on the Underground" | 1998 | 72 | — | — | — | — | — | 'A' vs. Monkey Kong |
| "Old Folks" | 1999 | 54 | — | — | — | — | — | 'A' vs. Monkey Kong |
| "I Love Lake Tahoe" | 1999 | 59 | — | — | 70 | — | — | 'A' vs. Monkey Kong |
| "A" | 2000 | — | — | — | — | — | — | 'A' vs. Monkey Kong |
| "Nothing" | 2002 | 9 | 88 | 58 | 70 | 46 | 83 | Hi-Fi Serious |
| "Starbucks" | 2002 | 20 | — | — | — | — | — | Hi-Fi Serious |
| "Something's Going On" | 2002 | 51 | — | — | — | — | — | Hi-Fi Serious |
| "Good Time" | 2003 | 23 | — | — | — | — | — | Non-album single |
| "Rush Song" | 2005 | 35 | — | — | — | — | — | Teen Dance Ordinance |
| "Better Off with Him" | 2005 | 52 | — | — | — | — | — | Teen Dance Ordinance |
| "Hello Sunshine" | 2026 | — | — | — | — | — | — | Prang |
| "Walkover" | 2026 | — | — | — | — | — | — | Prang |
| "Shit Summer" | 2026 | — | — | — | — | — | — | Prang |
| "Bring On the Likes" | 2026 | — | — | — | — | — | — | Prang |
"—" denotes a recording that did not chart or was not released in that territory.
