= Rockin' Like Dokken =

EP by A
- Released: 2003
- Recorded: Inner City Sumo Tour November 2002 (tracks 1–5) Eden studios, London 2002 (track 6)
- Genre: Rock
- Label: Warner Bros. (Japan), London Records (UK)
- Producer: Al Clay

A chronology
Hi-Fi Serious (2002)	Rockin' Like Dokken (2003)	Teen Dance Ordinance (2005)

Rockin' Like Dokken is a live mini-album by rock band A which was released in Japan and the UK only. The majority of tracks were recorded live on tour on A's Inner City Sumo Tour during November 2002. Japanese editions include the studio recording "Human Condition" as a bonus track. The album also includes a video of "Just Like Paradise" in the enhanced portion of the CD.

== Track listing ==
All music written by A. All lyrics written by Jason Perry; except "Just Like Paradise" music and lyrics by Brett Tuggle and David Lee Roth.

1. "Starbucks" (live)
2. "Something's Going On" (live)
3. "6 O' Clock on a Tube Stop" (live)
4. "I Love Lake Tahoe" (live)
5. "Nothing" (live)
6. "Human Condition" (Japan only bonus track)
7. "Just Like Paradise" (film) (enhanced video)

== Personnel ==
- Eds and Jason Perry - mixing (1–5)
- Al Clay - producer (6, 7), mixing (6)
- Alex Clark - Pro Tools (7)
- Dominic Anderson and A - filming (7)
- Jason Perry - film editing (7)
- Mat Maitland at Big Active - design and art direction
- David Foldvan - illustration
- Daniel P. Carter - typeface
