= Star Girl (song) =

2006 single by McFly

- One of artwork variants

Single by McFly

from the album Motion in the Ocean
- Released: 23 October 2006
- Length: 3:29
- Label: Island; Universal
- Songwriters: Tom Fletcher; Danny Jones; Dougie Poynter; Harry Judd; Jason Perry; Julian Emery; Daniel P. Carter
- Producers: Julian Emery; Jason Perry

McFly singles chronology
"Don't Stop Me Now" / "Please, Please" (2006)	"Star Girl" (2006)	"Sorry's Not Good Enough" / "Friday Night" (2006)

"Star Girl" is the second single from English pop rock band McFly's third studio album, Motion in the Ocean (2006). Released in the UK on 23 October 2006, the song was the band's sixth number-one single in the UK, staying in the top 20 for two weeks. In 2009, the song was played in space to wake up the astronauts on the space station, with thanks to a successful Twitter campaign started by band member Tom Fletcher, asking NASA to play the song in space.

== Background ==
"Star Girl" was written by McFly, Jason Perry, Julian Emery and Daniel P. Carter. The single features a live recording of "Silence is a Scary Sound" from the Wonderland Tour 2005 DVD. "Silence is a Scary Sound" was written by McFly bassist Dougie Poynter when he was 14 years old. The single also includes the first track from the Motion in the Ocean album, "We Are the Young". The song was inspired by a dream Tom Fletcher had about falling in love with an alien woman. The song was originally called "Good Night", but the band felt the lyrics didn't fit. Tom had a dream about writing a massive, Westlife style song written about falling in love with an alien woman so he decided to replace the "Good Night" lyrics with the new lyrics, hoping it would be a bigger success than the song he wrote in his dream.

On 2 June 2008 McFly made a surprise guest appearance at the Jonas Brothers' concert at Wembley Arena, where they performed "Star Girl" along with the Jonas Brothers. Beginning in early 2010, Star Girl was played every Friday morning on The Chris Moyles Show on BBC Radio 1 in a feature called "McFlyday". On the final Chris Moyles Show broadcast 14 September 2012 the band re-recorded the track with altered lyrics relating to Chris Moyles and BBC Radio 1.

== Chart performance ==
The song debuted at number one on the UK Singles Chart. Although debuting at number one, the single dropped to number nine the following week and spent just six weeks in the top 75.

== Music video ==
The video featured home footage of the band at Danny's house in Bolton as well as a performance scene filmed in South London in front of a live, fan-based audience. The home footage featured the boys sending Dougie Poynter into "space" and testing out a variety of Don't-Try-These-At-Home type stunts, Later in that video Dougie is in a spaceship eating a floating on air malteaser.

== Track listings ==
UK CD1

1. "Star Girl"
2. "We Are the Young"

UK CD2

1. "Star Girl" – 3:29
2. "Silence Is a Scary Sound" (live from the Manchester MEN)
3. "Transylvania"
4. "Star Girl" (U-Myx version)
5. "Silence Is a Scary Sound" (live from the Manchester MEN – video)
6. "Just My Luck DVD Trailer"

UK DVD single

1. "Star Girl"
2. "Star Girl" (video)
3. "Behind the Scenes Footage" (from the 'Just My Luck' Set)
4. "Harry's Scene in 'Just My Luck'"

== Charts ==
=== Weekly charts ===
Chart (2006)	Peak position
Europe (Eurochart Hot 100)	7
Ireland (IRMA)	14
Scotland Singles (OCC)	1
UK Singles (OCC)	1
UK Airplay (Music Week)	31

Chart (2010)	Peak position
South Korea (GAON)	171

=== Year-end charts ===
Chart (2006)	Position
UK Singles (OCC)	88

== Certifications ==
Region	Certification	Certified units/sales
United Kingdom (BPI)	Platinum	600,000^{‡}
^{‡} Sales+streaming figures based on certification alone.
