= Jason Perry (singer) =

British singer (born 1969)

- Born: 29 December 1969 (age 56); Leeds, Yorkshire, England
- Genres: Rock, alternative rock
- Occupations: Singer, songwriter, record producer
- Years active: 1993–present
- Label: London Recordings/Warner

Jason Perry (born 29 December 1969) is an English singer, songwriter and record producer. He is the lead vocalist of the Suffolk-based band alternative rock 'A'. He has an identical twin brother, Adam, and a younger brother, Giles, both of whom are also members of the band. Recently, Perry has produced albums by Greywind, Fatherson, Don Broco, Molotov, McBusted, Matthew P, Ivyrise, the Blackout, Kids in Glass Houses, Get Cape. Wear Cape. Fly, Futures, Matt Willis and McFly.

== Musical career ==
=== Early career and How Ace Are Buildings (1988–1997) ===
A were formed in the late 1980s, as Grand Designs, and changed their name to A in 1993. The band cited their influences as Rush, the Beach Boys, Van Halen and the Beastie Boys. At the time, Perry had a job creating music for TV ads. He bought a studio, which he also used to produce some demos for the band. A landed a deal with London Records in 1996, and released records under their own Tycoon Records subsidiary. In 1997, they recorded their debut album, How Ace Are Buildings, over three months in California. Perry co-produced the album with Thom Wilson, most famous for producing the Offspring's "Smash". A began to build up a loyal following in the UK, touring with the likes of the Sex Pistols, Jesus Jones and their heroes Faith No More. After the album was released, bassist Stevie Swindon parted ways with the band and was replaced by their friend Daniel P Carter. In 1998, How Ace Are Buildings was re-released in limited quantities on vinyl, with a bonus record featuring live tracks, remixes, clips from interviews, answering machine messages and general silliness. The record was produced, engineered, mixed and mastered by Perry.

=== A vs. Monkey Kong (1999–2000) ===
In 1999, they released their second album, 'A' vs. Monkey Kong, which had a more mature sound than their debut, and is regarded by many as their finest hour. With its release, they began touring internationally for the first time. The single "I Love Lake Tahoe", about their love of snowboarding at Lake Tahoe was a big hit in Germany, and in 2000 the band embarked on a worldwide tour with the Bloodhound Gang. Perry produced many of the B-sides from this period.

=== Hi-Fi Serious and commercial success (2001–2002) ===
The third album, Hi-Fi Serious, had been recorded in Germany with producer Al Clay in 2001. The first single, "Nothing", had achieved major success, peaking on the UK singles chart at number 9. This was followed by the singles Starbucks and Something's Going On, which charted at number 20 and number 51 respectively. The band spent 2002 touring worldwide, appearing at many of the world's major festivals, and won a Kerrang! award for best British band. This was the band's most successful period to date.

=== Teen Dance Ordinance and breakup (2003–2007) ===
After a brief delay, the fourth studio album was recorded in early 2004 in Seattle, with producer Terry Date. Again, the album marked a more mature sound for the band, and was regarded as containing the band's strongest material. Around the time the album was completed, the band's UK label, London Records, was bought out by Warner Music. Unfortunately this meant the album was shelved for the rest of the year.

The band made a brief return in August of that year at the Reading and Leeds festivals, headlining the Concrete Jungle stage. At the end of the year, the new A album was given a release date of April 2005.

A returned with a four night residency at the Metro Club in London, followed by a tour of Germany and a 19-date UK tour. First single "Rush Song" was released in May, but due to their two-year absence, coupled with the re-emergence of Britpop, with bands such as Kaiser Chiefs and Franz Ferdinand dominating the airwaves, the single inevitably received little airplay, TV coverage or press, as well as little promotion from their label. The single entered the charts at number 35, giving them a fourth top 40 hit. The album, Teen Dance Ordinance, was finally released on 22 June 2005. Despite how much things had been looking up for them due to the success of Hi-Fi, Ordinance hardly managed to crack the top 100. The album was well received amongst fans, and received positive reviews in the press, but after a main stage appearance at the Download Festival in the UK, and some dates with Avril Lavigne in Germany, it was announced that the band was being dropped by their label due to poor record sales and that the band was going into hiatus, stating that they would be unable to continue financially. A returned in 2007 to play a one-off festival in Rochford, and have been touring sporadically ever since.

=== Reunion and Prang (2018–present) ===
A properly reunited in 2018, with Dougie Poynter of friends McFly filling in for former bassist Daniel P. Carter. Poynter would remain a member of the band until 2022 when graphic designer Richard Trigg joined and finalised the band's new lineup.

A sent out an email in October 2025 stating that they were filming a music video for the song "Techno Viking" on 20 December of that year.

A's fifth album, Prang, was released on 22 May 2026.

== Record producer ==
In 2004, Perry moved to Essex and built a new studio, and also spent time on the road with the Bloodhound Gang, as part of their crew.

Perry's work as a record producer began in 2005, initially as part of Collective, a songwriting and production team, also featuring established songwriter Julian Emery and A bassist Daniel P Carter.

The team's first project was co-writing and producing the debut album from Matt Willis entitled Don't Let It Go to Waste. The album reached gold status and spawned three top 40 singles in the UK.

The team then worked with McFly on their third album, Motion in the Ocean. The album was a huge success reaching the top 10 and spawning three number 1 singles in the UK. Perry also produced the band's fourth album Radio:Active, released in July 2008 as a Mail on Sunday supplement, followed by a full release in September 2008. More recently, Perry has produced albums by Don Broco, Molotov, McBusted, Ivyrise, the Blackout, Kids in Glass Houses, Get Cape. Wear Cape. Fly, Futures, and Matt Willis.

Perry was awarded a Latin Grammy in 2014 for Molotov's Agua Maldita in the "best rock album" category. The record was also nominated for a Grammy at the 2015 awards in the "Best Latin Rock, Urban or Alternative Album" category.

== Personal life ==
Perry spent his childhood in Leeds, before moving to Suffolk with his family at the age of 13. He attended Reydon High School, where he met guitarist Mark Chapman and bassist Stevie Swindon. Together they formed the band Grand Designs, with Jason's twin brother Adam on drums, and by the late 1980s they were playing regular gigs in and around Lowestoft. The band had a prog rock inspired sound, similar to that of It Bites, Yes and Rush. After finishing high school, Perry attended Suffolk College where he studied graphic design. In 1991, he moved to London where he shared a flat with Adam, Stevie and Dan Hawkins, who later went on to be in the Darkness. Perry married his longtime girlfriend Holly in 2000, the couple have four children Zac, Joshua, Louie, and Primrose Violette.

As of 2023 Perry is in a relationship with Emma Barton, who plays Honey in Eastenders.

== Discography ==
=== With A ===
- How Ace Are Buildings (1997)
- 'A' vs. Monkey Kong (1999)
- Exit Stage Right (2000)
- Hi-Fi Serious (2002)
- Rockin' Like Dokken (2003)
- Teen Dance Ordinance (2005)
- Prang (2026)

=== Producer and writer ===
Year	Artist	Album
2005	The Riverclub	Long Before I Reach the Phone
2005	Bloodhound Gang	Hefty Fine (as assistant engineer)
2006	Matt Willis	Don't Let It Go to Waste
2006	McFly	Motion in the Ocean
2008	McFly	Radio:Active
2009	The Blackout	The Best in Town
2009	Kids in Glass Houses	Dirt
2010	McFly	Above the Noise
2011	Kids in Glass Houses	In Gold Blood
2013	Octane Ok	Face the Facts
2013	Mcfly	Unreleased sixth album
2014	Molotov	Agua Maldita
2014	McBusted	Mcbusted
2014	Kingsland Road	TBA
2015	Don Broco	Automatic
2016	Emma Blackery	Sucks to Be You
2017	Greywind	Afterthoughts
2018	Don Broco	Technology
2020	McFly	Young Dumb Thrills
2021	Trash Boat	Don't You Feel Amazing
2021	Don Broco	Amazing Things
2026	The Molotovs	Wasted on Youth
2026	Don Broco	Nightmare Tripping
