= Daniel P. Carter =

British musician and radio DJ (born 1972)

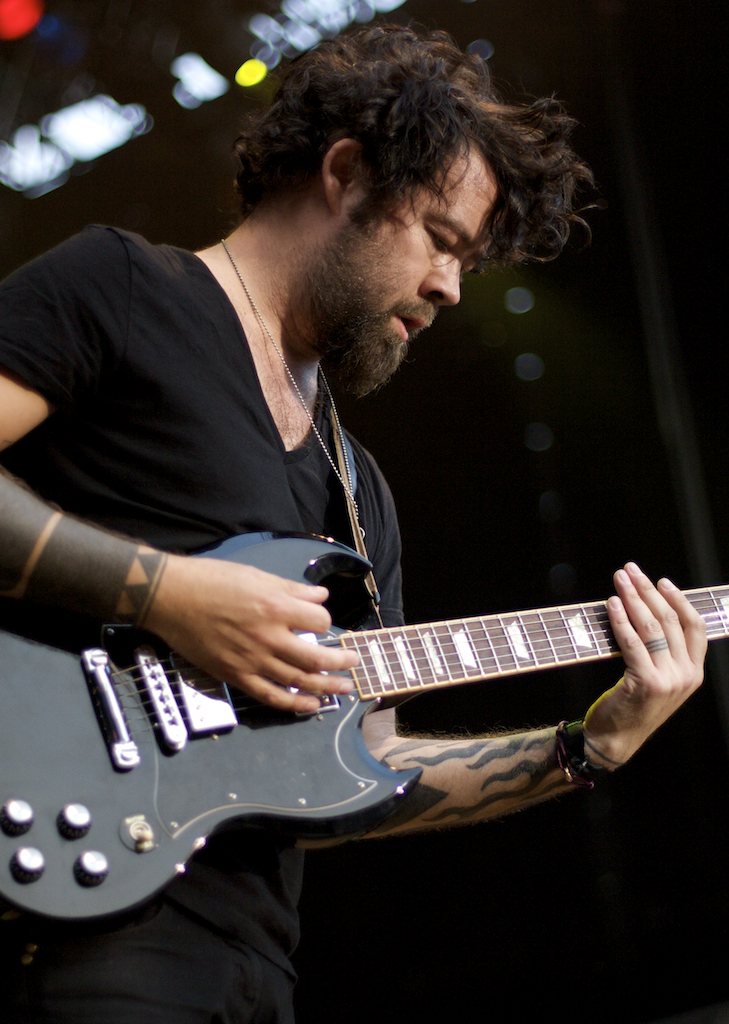
- Carter performing in 2009

Background information
- Born: Daniel Philip Carter; 16 November 1972 (age 53); Reading, England
- Genres: Alternative rock, post-hardcore, hard rock, heavy metal, hardcore punk, punk rock, pop punk, indie rock
- Occupations: Musician, DJ
- Instruments: Guitar, bass guitar, vocals
- Member of: Bloodhound Gang
- Formerly of: Hexes, A, Krokodil, The Subways, The Lucky Nine

Daniel Philip Carter (born 16 November 1972) is a British musician and radio DJ. He is the former singer and guitarist for hardcore punk band Hexes, the former bassist for A, current lead guitarist for alternative rock band Bloodhound Gang and current guitarist for metal group Krokodil. Carter is also the host of BBC Radio 1's Rock Show.

== Career ==
=== A (1997–2007) ===
Born in Reading, England. Carter joined the rock band 'A' in 1997, replacing original bassist Stevie Swindon. The band had just released their debut album How Ace Are Buildings, and spent the next year touring the UK.

In 1999 they released their second album A vs. Monkey Kong. With its release they began touring internationally for the first time. The single "I Love Lake Tahoe" was a big hit in Germany, and in 2000 the band embarked on a worldwide tour with The Bloodhound Gang.

The third album was Hi-Fi Serious, recorded in Germany with producer Al Clay in 2001. The first single from that album was "Nothing". The track reached the UK top 10. This was followed by top 20 hit "Starbucks". The band spent 2002 touring worldwide, appearing at many of the world's major festivals, and won a Kerrang award for best British band. In 2003, 'A' released a brand new single "Good Time".

Album four was recorded in early 2004 in Seattle with producer Terry Date. Around the time the album was completed, the band's UK label, London Records, was bought out by Warner Music, which meant the album was shelved for the rest of the year. 'A' made a brief return in August of that year, appearing at the Reading and Leeds festivals headlining the Concrete Jungle stage.

The album Teen Dance Ordinance was finally released on 18 July 2005. The album's first single "Rush Song" was released in May. The single entered the charts at number 35, giving them a fourth top 40 hit. After six months of touring, including dates with Avril Lavigne in Germany, a main stage appearance at the Download Festival, it was announced that the band was being dropped by their label, Warner Music, due to poor record sales. The band then went into hiatus, stating that they were unable to continue financially.

=== Collective ===
In 2005, Carter teamed up with old friend and established songwriter Julian Emery and fellow 'A' member Jason Perry, and formed "Collective", a songwriting and production team. Collective is managed by Jason Perry's brother Adam. Their first project was co-writing and producing the debut album from Matt Willis, Don't Let It Go to Waste. Carter co-wrote "Luxury", "Who You Gonna Run To", "Get Bored", "Not Over" and "Whats the Point". The album reached gold status and included three top 40 UK singles.

The team's next project was McFly's third album, Motion in the Ocean. The album reached the top 10 and produced three number-one singles in the UK. Carter co-wrote "Star Girl", which was a number-one single, and "Friday Night", which also appeared on soundtrack of the 2006 film Night at the Museum.

The team have also been involved with a string of writing sessions with the likes of Sugababes and Andrea Corr.

=== Other work ===
In 2005, Carter formed The Lucky Nine, alongside members of Hundred Reasons and Cable. The band released their five-track self-titled EP on Mighty Atom Records, followed by the debut album True Crown Foundation Songs: Hymns of Hidden History and Ritual on Hassle Records later the same year. After several tours and festival shows in support of the album, they disbanded.

Over 2005 and 2006, Carter briefly became a member of Matt Willis live band after playing bass and guitar on the album Don't Let It Go to Waste. He played bass with Matt Willis at a Radio One Live Lounge session, V Festival, Top of the Pops, Popworld Childline Concert and a UK tour. He did not feature with the band on the "Crash" video because of other commitments. He wrote the guitar parts for "Stargirl" by McFly, which was the first song to be broadcast from space.

2009 saw the debut release of British hardcore punk band Hexes debut album White Noise / Black Sound via Undergroove Records. Carter was main songwriter in the band and played guitar and vocals. The release of the album saw them play shows with Gallows, The Ghost of a Thousand, Finch and The Bronx.

In 2009, Carter joined former 'A' bandmate Adam Perry in the Bloodhound Gang, replacing former guitarist Matt Stigliano, who had left due to issues with the other members. He performed live with the band between 2009 and 2013. In July 2025, he recorded new demo tapes with Perry and Bloodhound Gang vocalist Jimmy Pop at a studio in Malta.

From June 2011, Carter became the official voice of Scuzz TV, a rock and metal music TV station based in the UK.

In 2014, Carter formed the metal band Krokodil with James Leech and Dan Foord of Sikth, Laurent Barnard of Gallows, Alessandro "Vman" Venturella formerly of Cryforsilence (now Slipknot) and Simon Wright of Liber Necris. The band toured in support of their debut album Nachash which was released on Spinefarm / Universal. The album was listed in Rolling Stone as one of its top 20 metal albums of that year, writing "The six-piece's first full-length—the most arresting metal debut of 2014—revels in the blood and thunder of early Mastodon, the burly groove-core of Coalesce and, occasionally, the calm-before-the-storm chill-outs of Mogwai." Writing for the follow-up album was started but has yet to see the light of day.

As well as work as a broadcaster and musician, Carter is a painter and illustrator who studied at Central Saint Martins school of art in London. As well as various gallery shows, he has provided album artwork for bands such as HIM, The Dillinger Escape Plan, Cradle of Filth, Behemoth, Frank Iero, Krokodil, Bossk, Black Foxxes, Vision of Disorder and Hang the Bastard.
