= Wasted on You =

Wasted on You may refer to:

- "Wasted on You" (Evanescence song)
- "Wasted on You" (Morgan Wallen song)

== See also ==
- Wasted on Youth, a 2026 album
