= Night at the Museum (soundtrack) =

Night at the Museum (Original Motion Picture Soundtrack)

Film score by Alan Silvestri
- Released: December 19, 2006
- Recorded: 2006
- Studios: Newman Scoring Stage, 20th Century Fox Studios, Los Angeles, California; Todd-AO Scoring Stage, Hollywood, California
- Genre: Film score
- Length: 53:19
- Labels: Varèse Sarabande; Fox Music
- Producers: Alan Silvestri; David Bifano

Alan Silvestri chronology
The Wild (2006)	Night at the Museum (2006)	Beowulf (2007)

Night at the Museum (Original Motion Picture Soundtrack) is the film score composed and conducted by Alan Silvestri, and performed by the Hollywood Studio Symphony to the 2006 film Night at the Museum directed by Shawn Levy starring Ben Stiller in the lead role, alongside Carla Gugino, Dick Van Dyke, Mickey Rooney, Bill Cobbs, and Robin Williams. The soundtrack featuring 35 tracks from Silvestri's score was released on December 19, 2006 via Varèse Sarabande and Fox Music.

== Background ==
Alan Silvestri composed the film score for Night at the Museum. He was initially associated in the film when Stephen Sommers was attached as the director; Silvestri and Sommers worked in The Mummy Returns (2001) and Van Helsing (2004). When Levy replaced Sommers, John Ottman also replaced Silvestri as the composer, but later Silvestri returned to score the film. It was recorded at the Newman Scoring Stage at 20th Century Fox Studios. Silvestri conducted the 101-piece orchestra which involved eight French horns, six percussionists and a choir. He set up a mobile studio at the scoring stage, so that he could simultaneously write and record the score, making any necessary adjustments and changes needed in an identical setup to his studio. The score was orchestrated by Dave Slonaker, Conrad Pope and John Ashton Thomas, mixed by Dennis S. Sands and edited by Ken Karman. Varèse Sarabande released the soundtrack album on December 19, 2006.

== Reception ==
Thomas Glorieux of Maintitles noted that Silvestri's score "has its moments, but [...] isn't exactly hitting you with one adventure after another". Clark Douglas of Movie Music UK admitted that while "[Silvestri's] effort is satisfactory, it's a little bit disappointing" as the composer seemed to "have been directed to provide more standard action music for the proceedings".

Christian Clemmensen of Filmtracks wrote "There are no unlistenable moments in Night at the Museum, however, and something must be said for Silvestri's proven consistency in the genre." AllMusic reviewed "Veteran film score composer Alan Silvestri gives a variety of sumptuous orchestral treatments to this New York fable of mysterious nighttime goings on at the Natural History Museum." Justin Chang of Variety wrote "Alan Silvestri's score is a bit on the obvious side." Stephen Holden of The New York Times wrote "Contributing to the bulk is a score (by Alan Silvestri) that rivals the Star Wars soundtracks in pounding grandiosity."

== Track listing ==
All tracks are written by Alan Silvestri.

Night at the Museum (Original Motion Picture Soundtrack)
No.	Title	Length
1.	"Night at the Museum"	02:35
2.	"One of Those Days"	00:49
3.	"An Ordinary Guy?"	01:27
4.	"Tour of the Museum"	02:35
5.	"Civil War Soldiers"	04:08
6.	"Out of Africa"	01:07
7.	"Meet Dexter"	01:27
8.	"Mayan Warriors"	00:57
9.	"Where's Rexy?"	00:48
10.	"West from Africa"	01:49
11.	"The Iron Horse"	01:06
12.	"Saved by Teddy"	01:57
13.	"Tablet of Akmenrah"	00:37
14.	"Tracking, Dear Boy"	01:08
15.	"Some Men Are Born Great"	00:50
16.	"Sunrise"	00:42
17.	"Study Up on History"	02:15
18.	"Teddy Likes Sacagawea"	01:53
19.	"Tearing Limbs"	01:45
20.	"Caveman on Fire"	00:43
21.	"Outrun the Sun"	00:58
22.	"Show You What I Do"	02:55
23.	"Tablet's Gone"	02:45
24.	"Theodore Roosevelt at Your Service"	01:11
25.	"This Is Your Moment"	02:10
26.	"Rally the Troops"	01:07
27.	"Tree Take Down"	01:21
28.	"Cecil's Escape"	01:26
29.	"Stage Coach"	02:28
30.	"Teddy in Two"	01:18
31.	"Cab Ride"	00:50
32.	"Big Fan"	01:03
33.	"Heroes Return"	00:54
34.	"A Great Man"	00:57
35.	"Full House"	01:21
Total length:		53:19

== Additional music ==
The following songs are featured in the film, but not in the soundtrack:

- "Friday Night" – performed by McFly; not featured in American version of the film, but heard in some international cuts, used during the end credits. It can be heard on the American DVD on the Spanish dub.
- "September" – performed by Earth, Wind and Fire; used before the end credits where everyone in the museum is partying.
- "Weapon of Choice" – performed by Fatboy Slim; used in the scene where Larry returns to the museum for his second night and is preparing for the chaos.
- "Tonight" – performed by Keke Palmer featuring Cham; used for the end credits.
- An instrumental version of "Mandy" by Barry Manilow is used when Larry is standing in the elevator, while escaping from Attila the Hun.
- "Ezekiel Saw Them Dry Bones" is the tune Larry whistles as he passes the empty T. rex exhibit on his first night.
- "Camptown Races" by Stephen Foster is sung by the townspeople of the American West miniature diorama. This is a period-correct song.

== Personnel ==
Credits adapted from liner notes:

- Music composer – Alan Silvestri
- Producer – Alan Silvestri, David Bifano
- Engineer – Bill Talbott
- Additional engineer – John Richards
- Recordist – Tim Lauber
- Recording – Dennis Sands, Michael Atwater
- Mixing – Dennis Sands
- Mastering – Pat Sullivan Fourstar
- Supervising music editor – Terry Wilson
- Music editor – Ken Karmen
- Score coordinator – David Bifano
- Production coordinator – Rebecca Morellato
- Copyist – Joann Kane Music Services
- Executive producer – Robert Townson
- Executive in charge of music for 20th Century Fox – Robert Kraft
- Music business affairs for 20th Century Fox – Dale Melidosian
- Music supervision for 20th Century Fox – Danielle Diego, Geoff Bywater

Orchestra

- Performer – Hollywood Studio Symphony
- Orchestrators – Conrad Pope, David Slonaker, John Ashton-Thomas
- Conductor – Alan Silvestri
- Contractor – Peter Rotter, Sandy de Crescent
- Concertmaster – Rene M. Mandel
- Stage manager – Francesco Perlangeli, Tom Steel

Instruments

- Bassoons – Michael R. O'Donovan,^{[P]} David Riddles, Kenneth Munday
- Cellos – Dennis Karmazyn,^{[P]} Andrew T. Shulman, Antony Cooke, Armen Ksajikian, Cecilia Tsan, Christine Ermacoff, Dane Little, David Speltz, George Kim Scholes, Steve Erdody
- Double Basses – Nico Carmine Abondolo,^{[P]} Bruce Morgenthaler, Christian Kollgaard, David Parmeter, Drew D. Dembowski, Edward Meares, Michael Valerio, Susan Ranney
- Clarinets – James M. Kanter,^{[P]} Joshua Ranz, Ralph Williams, Steven Roberts
- Flutes – James Walker,^{[P]} David Shostac, Geraldine Rotella, Stephen Kujala
- French Horns – James W. Thatcher,^{[P]} Daniel P. Kelley, David Duke, Kristy Morrell, Mark L. Adams, Paul Klintworth, Philip Edward Yao, Steven Becknell
- Harps – Jo Ann Turovsky,^{[P]} Katie Kirkpatrick^{[P]}
- Oboes – Leanne Becknell,^{[P]} Leslie H. Reed, Phillip Ayling
- Percussion – Alan Estes,^{[P]} Gregory Goodall, Michael Fisher, Peter Limonick, Steven Schaeffer, Wade Culbreath
- Piano – Bryan Pezzone,^{[P]} Thomas J. Ranier^{[P]}
- Trombones – William Booth,^{[P]} Andrew Thomas Malloy, George Thatcher, Steven Holtman
- Trumpets – Malcolm McNab,^{[P]} Jon Lewis, Timothy G. Morrison
- Tuba – Doug Tornquist
- Violas – Brian Dembow,^{[P]} Andrew Duckles, David F. Walther, Jennie Hansen, Keith Greene, Marlow Fisher, Piotr T. Jandula, Rick Gerding, Roland Kato, Shawn Mann, Thomas Diener, Victoria Miskolczy
- Violins – Julie Ann Gigante,^{[P2]} Rene M. Mandel,^{[C]} Agnes Gottschewski, Aimee Kreston, Alan Grunfeld, Amy Hershberger, Anatoly Rosinsky, Armen Anassian, Audrey Solomon, Bruce Dukov, Darius Campo, Dimitrie Leivici, Eric J. Hosler, Eun-Mee Ahn, Helen Nightengale, Irina Voloshina, Ishani Bhoola, Jeanne Skrocki, Josefina Vergara, Katia Popov, Kevin Connolly, Liane Mautner, Lisa M. Sutton, Michele Richards, Miwako Watanabe, Phillip Levy, Rafael Rishik, Roberto Cani, Roger Wilkie, Sara Parkins, Songa Lee, Tamara Hatwan

Choir

- Vocal contractor – Rick Logan
- Choir – Alvin Chea, Amick Byram, Bob Joyce, Bobbi Page, Debbie Hall-Gleason, Donna Medine, Dwayne Condon, Jenny Graham, John West, Jon Joyce, Josef Powell, Linda Harmon, Michael Geiger, Reid Bruton, Rick Logan, Sandie Hall, Walt Harrah

Notes

- ^{^[P]} Principal
- ^{^[P2]} Principal 2nd
- ^{^[C]} Concertmaster

== Accolades ==
Awards	Category	Recipient(s)	Result	Ref.
ASCAP Film and Television Music Awards	Top Box Office Films	Alan Silvestri	Won	
