= Something's Going On (song) =

Single by A

from the album Hi-Fi Serious
- Released: 2002
- Recorded: 2002
- Genre: Alternative rock, post-grunge, hard rock, pop rock
- Length: 3:02
- Label: London
- Songwriter(s): Jason Perry
- Producer(s): Al Clay

A singles chronology
"Starbucks" (2002)	"Something's Going On" (2002)	"Good Time" (2003)

"Something's Going On" is a song by English rock band A, released as the third and final single from their third album Hi-Fi Serious. It reached number 51 on the UK Singles Chart and was C listed by BBC Radio One. A live version appears on the live EP Rockin' Like Dokken.

The song was used to advertise Tony Hawk's video game Pro Skater 4. It is also used in the What's New, Scooby-Doo? episode "Farmed and Dangerous", and the video game, Surf's Up.

The promotional video for "Something's Going On" features the band performing in a wind tunnel, before the force of the wind shears away the metal walls around them.

== Track listing ==
CD 1

1. "Something's Going On" - 3:02
2. "Rock" - 4:05
3. "Human Condition" - 4:01
4. "Something's Going On" (video)

CD 2

1. "Something's Going On" - 3:02
2. "Sorry But..." - 4:03
3. "Just Like Paradise" (David Lee Roth cover) - 4:06
4. "Just Like Paradise" (film)

=== Vinyl ===
1. "Something's Going On" - 3:02
2. "Just Like Paradise" (David Lee Roth cover) - 4:06

== Charts ==
Chart (2002)	Peak position
UK Singles (OCC)	51
