= A Bridge over You =

Single by the Lewisham and Greenwich NHS Choir

from the album Something Inside So Strong
- Released: 9 December 2013
- Recorded: 2013
- Genre: Choral
- Length: 4:10 (single version); 5:25 (extended version)
- Label: Self-released
- Songwriters: Adam Morris; Peter Mitchell; Liam Dunachie; Paul Simon; Chris Martin; Jonny Buckland; Guy Berryman; Will Champion
- Producers: Dan Ludford-Thomas; Peter Mitchell; Megan Clark (exec.)

"A Bridge over You" is a charity single recorded and released independently by the Lewisham and Greenwich NHS Choir, the choir of the Lewisham and Greenwich NHS Trust located in south-east London. It is a mashup of "Bridge over Troubled Water" by Simon & Garfunkel and Coldplay's 2005 single "Fix You", with additional arrangement by the choir's conductor, Peter Mitchell. It reached number one on the UK Singles Chart at Christmas 2015.

== Background and recording ==
The Lewisham and Greenwich NHS Choir had previously appeared on the first series of Gareth Malone's BBC Two show The Choir: Sing While You Work, a competition between workplace choirs, in 2012. They finished the show as runners up. "A Bridge over You" was recorded in 2013, following the choir's appearance in the competition.

It was recorded at Angel Recording Studios in Islington, north London, with piano accompaniment by Liam Dunachie, guitars by Ed Cusick, bass by Sam Weston, drums by Christian Rae, and vocal direction by Dan Ludford and Peter Mitchell. The single was created and arranged by Adam Morris, with additional arrangements made by Peter Mitchell and Liam Dunachie. At the time of recording, the choir's artistic director was Dan Ludford-Thomas, the musical director Peter Mitchell, and the accompanist Liam Dunachie. An accompanying video featuring the song over footage of NHS staff working at the Trust was uploaded to YouTube.

=== Christmas number one campaign ===
A social media campaign to get the choir to the "Christmas number one", a period traditionally resulting in higher sales than the rest of the year, was launched in October 2015 by choir member Katie Rogerson, junior doctor Harriet Nerva, and Joe Blunden, a communications manager for the National Health Service (NHS). At the time, Secretary of State for Health Jeremy Hunt was debating extending the contracted hours of junior doctors, a move that proved controversial and which prompted the British Medical Association to consider strike action.

Nerva created a Facebook event for the campaign after the video "moved [her] to tears", telling Mirror Online that "getting it to Number One would bring to the public's eye the fantastic service it provides in very challenging times". Rogerson told The Guardian that "it's a challenging time for the NHS and morale is quite low ... We wanted people to recognise all the brilliant things that happen on an everyday basis rather than feel miserable and unappreciated."

On 13 January 2016, the UK Government announced that the value-added tax on sales of the single—16.5p from every 99p sale—would be donated to charity.

== Release and reception ==
"A Bridge over You" was originally released independently by Blunden on behalf of the NHS Trust through EmuBands on 9 December 2013 in support of various charities including Carers UK, Mind and other smaller healthcare related charities. The 2015 campaign's organisers asked supporters not to purchase the song until the week of the Christmas charts so as to focus sales.

On the week of the Christmas charts, Justin Bieber, whose song "Love Yourself" was the favourite for the accolade, tweeted his support for the choir's song: "For 1 week it's ok not be #1. Let's do the right thing & help them win. It's Christmas." Following his tweet, bookmaker Coral suspended betting on the odds of the single reaching number 1. On Christmas Eve, itv.com commented that the choir "now look unbeatable".

It reached number one on the UK Singles Chart at Christmas 2015, selling more than 127,000 copies, 88,000 sales fewer than Ben Haenow's 2014 Christmas number one "Something I Need". It beat off competition from Bieber as well as The X Factor winner Louisa Johnson, Adele, and Stormzy. It was the closest run-in to the Christmas number one since 2009, when Jon Morter's anti-X Factor social media campaign resulted in Rage Against the Machine's 1992 single "Killing in the Name" taking the accolade ahead of the competition's winner Joe McElderry. Blunden was in regular contact with Morter during the campaign for his previous experience with Christmas chart campaigns.

Blunden, who was manager of the #NHS4XmasNo1 campaign, told The Telegraph on Christmas Day that "it's an historic day for the NHS...a day that the country has shown just how much they love their NHS". Zoe Davies, a medical registrar who sings part of the opening solo, told The Northern Echo that "it gives the NHS a morale boost at a time of uncertainty about junior doctors' contracts and nurses' bursaries being taken away". Chidi Ejimofo, a Consultant in Emergency Medicine who sang the male solo part, told the South London Press "...it is about so much more than the front line doctors and nurses. This song celebrates the work of all the unsung heroes in the NHS, whose amazing work is often taken for granted.".

In its second week on the UK Singles Chart, the song broke the record for the biggest fall for a UK number one single, when it fell to number 29 on 1 January 2016. Previously, the record had been held by McFly's "Baby's Coming Back/Transylvania", which fell from number 1 to number 20 on 20 May 2007. The song dropped out of the charts completely the following week, making the song's two-week chart run the shortest ever for a UK number one single at the time; both records have since been beaten three times by LadBaby: his second single "I Love Sausage Rolls" fell from 1 to 57, before leaving the chart the following week; his third number one "Don't Stop Me Eatin'" only spent one week in the UK Top 75; finally, his 5th number one Food Aid dropped from 1 to 85.

== Credits and personnel ==
Credits adapted from the website of the Lewisham and Greenwich NHS Choir.

Writing

- Original songs ("Bridge over Troubled Water" and "Fix You") written by Paul Simon, Chris Martin, Jonny Buckland, Guy Berryman and Will Champion
- Arrangements – Adam Morris, Peter Mitchell and Liam Dunachie

Performance

- Performed by the Lewisham and Greenwich NHS Choir
- Piano – Liam Dunachie
- Guitars – Ed Cusick
- Bass – Sam Weston
- Drums – Christian Rae
- Vocal direction – Dan Ludford and Peter Mitchell

Production

- Produced – Dan Ludford-Thomas and Peter Mitchell
- Executive producer – Megan Clark
- Recorded at Angel Recording Studios, Islington, London

== Charts ==
Chart (2015)	Peak position
Scotland Singles (OCC)	1
UK Singles (OCC)	1
UK Singles Downloads (OCC)	1
UK Indie (OCC)	1

== Release history ==
Region	Date	Label	Format
United Kingdom	9 December 2013	Self-released (via EmuBands)	Digital download
