= Lewisham and Greenwich NHS Choir =

Choir

The Lewisham and Greenwich NHS Choir is made up of a wide range of NHS workers, including doctors, nurses, therapists and many other staff from across the NHS workforce. In 2015, they achieved the UK Christmas number 1, with their single "A Bridge over You", a mash up of Bridge over Troubled Water and Fix You. They released an album the following year, and recorded a version of Justin Bieber's Holy in December 2020. They also were seen performing Joy to the World after the Queen's Speech on Christmas Day 2020.

== Christmas number one campaign ==
A social media campaign to get the choir to the "Christmas number one", a period traditionally resulting in higher sales than the rest of the year, was launched in October 2015 by choir member Katie Rogerson, junior doctor Harriet Nerva, and Joe Blunden, a communications manager for the National Health Service (NHS). At the time, Secretary of State for Health Jeremy Hunt was debating extending the contracted hours of junior doctors, a move that proved controversial and which prompted the British Medical Association to consider strike action.

Nerva created a Facebook event for the campaign after the video "moved [her] to tears", telling Mirror Online that "getting it to Number One would bring to the public's eye the fantastic service it provides in very challenging times". Rogerson told The Guardian that "it's a challenging time for the NHS and morale is quite low ... We wanted people to recognise all the brilliant things that happen on an everyday basis rather than feel miserable and unappreciated."

On 13 January 2016, the UK Government announced that the value-added tax on sales of the single—16.5p from every 99p sale—would be donated to charity.

== Release and reception ==
"A Bridge over You" was originally released independently by Blunden on behalf of the NHS Trust through EmuBands on 9 December 2013 in support of various charities including Carers UK, Mind and other smaller healthcare related charities. The 2015 campaign's organisers asked supporters not to purchase the song until the week of the Christmas charts so as to focus sales.

On the week of the Christmas charts, Justin Bieber, whose song "Love Yourself" was the favourite for the accolade, tweeted his support for the choir's song: "For 1 week it's ok not be #1. [sic] Let's do the right thing & help them win. It's Christmas." Following his tweet, many bookmakers harshly lowered odds on the choir to achieve the Christmas number one, while Coral suspended betting altogether. On Christmas Eve, itv.com commented that the choir "now look unbeatable".

It reached number one on the UK Singles Chart at Christmas 2015, selling more than 127,000 copies, 88,000 sales fewer than Ben Haenow's 2014 Christmas number one "Something I Need". It beat off competition from Bieber as well as The X Factor winner Louisa Johnson, Adele, and Stormzy. It was the closest run-in to the Christmas number one since 2009, when Jon Morter's anti-X Factor social media campaign resulted in Rage Against the Machine's 1992 single "Killing in the Name" taking the accolade ahead of the competition's winner Joe McElderry. Blunden was in regular contact with Morter during the campaign for his previous experience with Christmas chart campaigns.

Blunden, who was manager of the #NHS4XmasNo1 campaign, told The Telegraph on Christmas Day that "it's an historic day for the NHS...a day that the country has shown just how much they love their NHS". Zoe Davies, a medical registrar who sings part of the opening solo, told The Northern Echo that "it gives the NHS a morale boost at a time of uncertainty about junior doctors' contracts and nurses' bursaries being taken away". Chidi Ejimofo, a Consultant in Emergency Medicine who sang the male solo part, told the South London Press "...it is about so much more than the front line doctors and nurses. This song celebrates the work of all the unsung heroes in the NHS, whose amazing work is often taken for granted.".

In its second week on the UK Singles Chart, the song broke the record for the biggest fall for a UK number one single, when it fell to number 29 on 1 January 2016. Previously, the record had been held by McFly's "Baby's Coming Back/Transylvania", which fell from number 1 to number 20 on 20 May 2007. The song dropped out of the charts completely the following week, making the song's two-week chart run the shortest ever for a UK number one single at the time; both records have since been beaten by LadBaby, with LadBaby's 3rd single spending just one single week in the top 75.

== Discography ==
=== Singles ===
Title	Year	Peak chart positions
Title	Year	UK
"A Bridge over You"	2015	1
"Thinking Out Loud"	2016	–
"Holy (with Justin Bieber)"	2020	41
"Anywhere Away From Here (with P!nk and Rag n Bone Man)"	2021	7

=== Album ===
Title	Year	Peak chart positions
Title	Year	UK
"Something Inside So Strong"	2016	69
