= The Lucky Nine =

Rock band

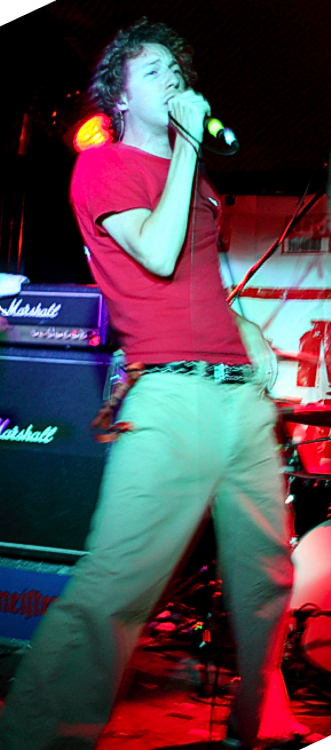
Colin Doran live in 2005

The Lucky Nine were an English rock band formed by members of the British rock bands A, Hundred Reasons, Cable, and Sunna/earthtone9. The group released the full-length True Crown Foundation Songs: Hymns of History and Hidden Ritual in 2005. In a 2005 interview with rockmidgets.com Dan Carter stated that 'two thirds' of the second album were already written and would be released at some point.

== Members ==
- Colin Doran – Vocals
- Jay David Rowe – Bass
- Richie Mills – Drums
- Ben Doyle – Guitar
- Daniel P. Carter – Guitar

== Discography ==
Albums

- True Crown Foundation Songs: Hymns of History and Hidden Ritual (Hassle Records, 2005)

EPs

- The Lucky Nine (EP)
