= Nothing (A song) =

Single by A

from the album Hi-Fi Serious
- Released: February 2002
- Recorded: 2001
- Genre: Nu metal
- Length: 3:44
- Label: London
- Songwriter: Jason Perry
- Producer: Al Clay

A singles chronology
| "I Love Lake Tahoe" (2000) | "Nothing" (2002) | "Starbucks" (2002) |

"Nothing" is a song by English rock band A, released as the first single from their third album Hi-Fi Serious. It reached number nine on the UK Singles Chart; to date, A's highest charting single. During the promotion of the single, the band appeared on Top of the Pops and the Pepsi Chart Show.

The promotional video for "Nothing" was filmed in Cape Town, South Africa, mostly around the Artscape Theatre Centre formerly known as the Nico Malan theatre complex, and features extras dressed in the same clothes as each band member - complete with band member masks - to create the illusion that there are hundreds of duplicates of the band.

"Nothing" is arguably the heaviest A single, marking something of a departure from the band's usual melodic pop punk to nu metal. It is track 1 on the album Hi-Fi Serious. A live version appears on the live album, Rockin' Like Dokken.

== Track listing ==
CD 1

1. "Nothing" - 3:44
2. "T-Shirt Money" - 3:28
3. "Everybody In" - 4:14
4. "Nothing" (video)

CD 2

1. "Nothing" - 3:44
2. "Getting Me Off" - 3:11
3. "The Distance" - 3:31
4. "The Distance" (video)

== Charts ==
=== Weekly charts ===
| Chart (2002–04) | Peak position |
|---|---|
| Australia (ARIA) | 88 |
| Germany (GfK) | 70 |
| Scotland Singles (OCC) | 8 |
| Sweden (Sverigetopplistan) | 46 |
| Switzerland (Schweizer Hitparade) | 83 |
| UK Singles (OCC) | 9 |
| UK Rock & Metal (OCC) | 32 |

=== Year-end charts ===
| Chart (2002) | Position |
|---|---|
| UK Singles (OCC) | 186 |

== In pop culture ==
"Nothing" appears as the title music on the PlayStation 2 and Xbox versions of the 2002 Atari/Eden published racing game V-Rally 3. The song also appears on the "V-Rally 3" website and was featured in the soundtrack of the anime series Beyblade V-Force.
