= Wasted on Youth =

Studio album by the Molotovs
- Released: 30 January 2026
- Studio: The Marshall Studio
- Genres: Punk; Britpop; indie rock
- Length: 32:12
- Label: Marshall
- Producers: The Molotovs; Jason Perry

Wasted on Youth is the debut studio album by the English rock band the Molotovs. It was released on 30 January 2026 by Marshall Records.

== Origins ==
The album was recorded at Marshall Studios in London. It was produced by Jason Perry, former lead singer of the band A. Wasted on Youth was mixed and mastered by Blair Crichton, guitarist of the band Dead Pony. According to lead singer Mathew Cartlidge, all the songs were fully composed when they went into the studio. Music videos were released for the songs "More More More", "Today's Gonna Be Our Day", and "Rhythm of Yourself". The album cover shows Mathew and Issey Cartlidge sitting on a sofa, both wearing suits.

The lyrics deal with the many problems that young people face. The track "More More More" is about a person who is indifferent to a fleeting relationship who tries to distract themselves with partying, but know deep down that they want more. "Rhythm of Yourself" is about a person in the music industry who tried to manipulate the band for their own benefit. "Today’s Gonna Be Our Day" is a song against complacency and about the power of youth.

== Publishing ==
Wasted on Youth was first released on 30 January 2026, by Marshall Records. The album was released in its original format as a CD (catalog number: ACCS10645) and LP (catalog number: ACCS10642), as well as for download and streaming, with twelve tracks. Prior to the album's release, the songs "More More More" (21 March 2025), "Today's Gonna Be Our Day" (20 June 2025), "Rhythm of Yourself" (31 October 2025), and "Get a Life" (5 January 2026) were released as singles. Each of the singles was accompanied by an official music video, with the exception of Get a Life.

== Promotion ==
On 21 March 2026, The Molotovs performed Today’s Gonna Be Our Day on The Jonathan Ross Show.

== Reception ==
James Hingle of the British magazine Kerrang! described Wasted on Youth as an album that "taps into the restless spirit of punk rock while giving it a sharp, modern edge." He added that the band, despite their age, "sound like seasoned professionals," awarding it four out of five points. According to Eric Meyer of the online magazine Plattentests.de, The Molotovs "hit the line perfectly between catchiness, power, and ambition." He wrote that if "guitar rock is allowed to sound like this in 2026, then the genre will be dusted off by itself." Meyer gave it eight out of ten points. Emma Harrison of the online magazine Clash wrote that the album "cements The Molotovs' reputation as one of the most exciting and explosive forces in music today." Harrison gave it eight out of ten points. Ellie Roberts of the online magazine The Arts Desk, however, described the album as "a somewhat clunky but impressive achievement." Roberts wrote the album “lacks self-awareness,” but that it is “laden with promise”. She gave it three out of five stars.

== Track listing ==
All tracks are written by Mathew Cartlidge.

1. "Get a Life" – 1:54
2. "Daydreaming" – 3:09
3. "More More More" – 2:07
4. "Come on Now" – 3:59
5. "Nothing Keeps Her Away" – 3:09
6. "Wasted on Youth" – 2:31
7. "Geraldine" – 2:52
8. "Newsflash" – 3:03
9. "Rhythm of Yourself" – 3:50
10. "Popstar" – 2:09
11. "Today’s Gonna Be Our Day" – 3:29

== Personnel ==
Credits adapted from the album's liner notes.

=== The Molotovs ===
- Mathew Cartlidge – lead vocals, guitar, production
- Issey Cartlidge – backing vocals, bass guitar, production

=== Additional contributors ===
- Jason Perry – production
- Adam Beer – engineering
- Oliver Brightman – engineering assistance
- Blair Crichton – mixing
- Dick Beetham – mastering on all tracks except "More More More"
- Robin Schmidt – mastering on "More More More"
- Noah Riley – drums
- Tilly O'Neil – design
- Nick Benoy – photography
- Olly Bromidge – photography
- Jeanie Jean – photography
- Aoife Hyland – photography
- Derek D'Souza – photography
- Charlie Hills – photography
- Liam Heaton – photography
- Kane Layland – photography

== Charts ==
Chart	Peak position
UK (OCC)	3

The songs "More More More" and "Today's Gonna Be Our Day" each reached number one on the UK vinyl singles chart. "Rhythm of Yourself" reached number three.
