= Kids in Glass Houses =

Welsh rock band

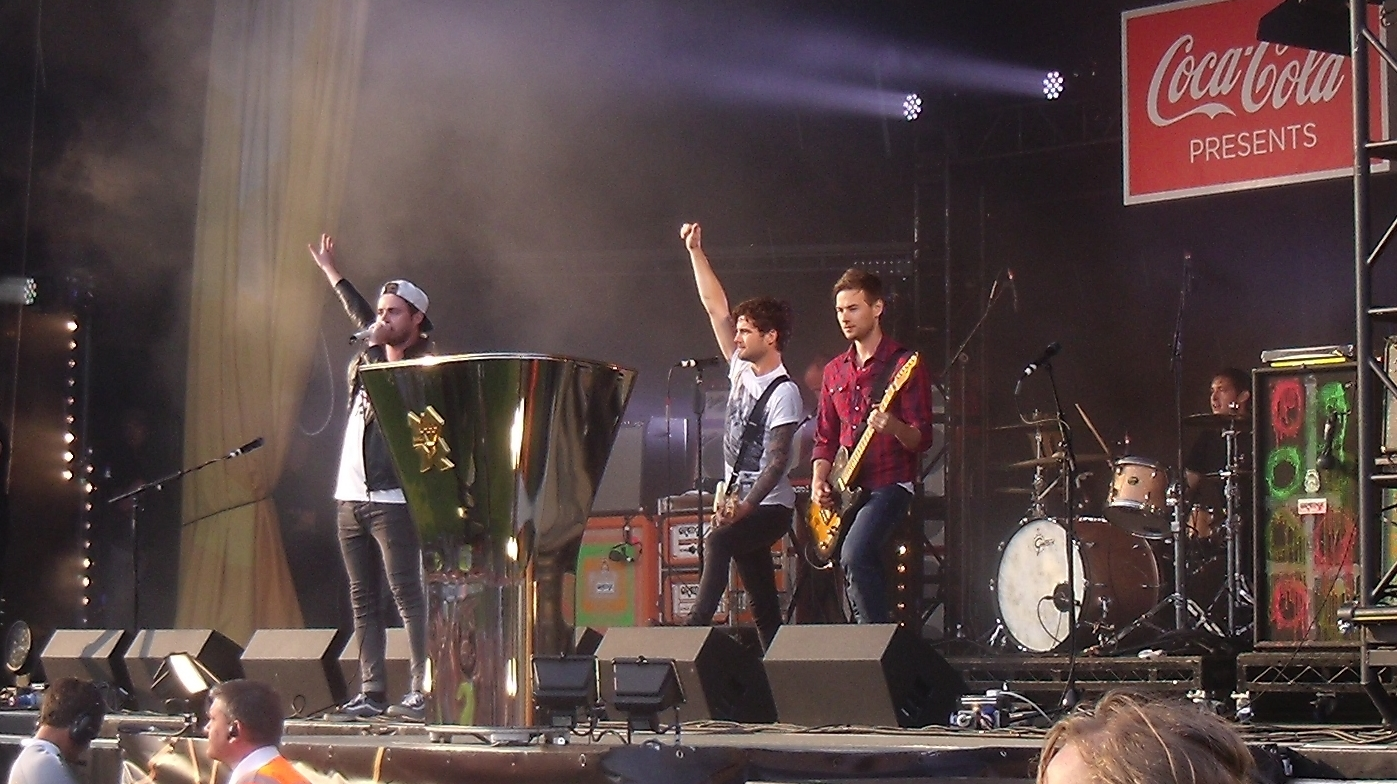
- Kids in Glass Houses performing in 2012

Background information
- Origin: Cardiff, Wales
- Genres: Alternative rock; indie rock; pop-punk; pop rock; emo
- Years active: 2004–2014; 2022–present
- Labels: Transmission; Warner; Roadrunner
- Members: Aled Phillips; Iain Mahanty; Andrew Shay; Joel Fisher; Philip Jenkins
- Past members: Aled Rees; Earl Phillips; Matt Hitt; Luke Bentley
- Website: www.kidsinglasshouses.uk

Kids in Glass Houses are a Welsh rock band from Cardiff. The band achieved success on the strength of the singles "Give Me What I Want" and "Saturday" from their debut album Smart Casual in 2008. The band released their second album Dirt in early 2010, releasing four singles, most notably "Matters at All". The band's third album, In Gold Blood, was released on 15 August 2011. Their fourth album, Peace, was released on 30 September 2013. The band announced their split in January 2014 and played their final show at Cardiff's Great Hall on 31 October 2014.

The band announced their reunion on 30 August 2022 and played their first show on 26 May 2023, 15 years to the day that Smart Casual was released. The band went on to release their fifth album, Pink Flamingo, on 25 October 2024.

== History ==
=== Beginnings (2004–2007) ===
The band's name is inspired by the lyrics "not throwing stones at you anymore" from the Glassjaw song "Tip Your Bartender". The quintet had a series of support slots during late 2006 and early 2007, playing alongside Thirty Seconds to Mars, Hundred Reasons, Manic Street Preachers and The Goo Goo Dolls and Fall Out Boy. In the band's early stages, they also shared the stage with the likes of Funeral for a Friend and The Used on the Taste of Chaos 2005 UK tour in Cardiff. They released their debut full-length EP E-Pocalypse! on 9 October 2006.

During their time as an unsigned band, the band garnered a rare and unprecedented amount of press and support from rock media, including Kerrang! and NME as well as BBC Radio 1 and XFM.

In August 2007, the band were nominated for Best British Newcomer at the Kerrang! Awards, where the group were beaten to the award by Gallows. During the run up to the awards, Kids in Glass Houses played a special show, titled The Day of Rock alongside Enter Shikari, Fightstar, The Answer and Turisas.

During October 2007, the band completed a 16 date headline tour of the UK supported by London's Tonight Is Goodbye (now Futures) and friends of the bands rotating on the tour – Saidmike (now Straight Lines) and The New 1920. Following that they supported fellow Welshmen Funeral for a Friend, on their December 2007 UK tour.

=== Smart Casual (2008) ===
They signed to Roadrunner Records on 8 December 2007, shortly before going on stage to support Funeral For A Friend. Between the October and December tours, the band recorded their debut album at Long Wave Studios with Romesh Dodangoda, who also produced the band's previous EP. During a studio session, the band recorded a live version of Glassjaw's "Ry Ry's Song".

The band released "Easy Tiger" as their first single on 10 March 2008. The video received considerable rotation on music channels, as well as entering the Kerrang! Top 10 Overdrive upon the first week of its release.

The band released their debut album, entitled Smart Casual, on 26 May 2008. The album features re-recordings of three songs from E-Pocalypse!. Prior to this, the single "Give Me What I Want" (a re-recording of the track "Me Me Me") was released on 19 May 2008.

On 21 May 2008, the band embarked on a headline tour to promote Smart Casual which finished with a performance at Astoria 2 on 5 June 2008. The support for the tour was provided by American punk rock band Valencia. This was followed by another headline tour during October, with support provided by This City and Save Your Breath, and a European tour with Zebrahead and Simple Plan. The band were one of the support acts for Paramore and New Found Glory on the 2008 RIOT Tour – during which guitarist Iain Mahanty joined New Found Glory onstage to perform their song, "Hit Or Miss". They also supported Fall Out Boy on their UK arena tour in March 2009.

In February 2009, website Punktastic.com released the video for "Dance All Night". The song was announced as a single but was not released.

=== DIRT (2010) ===
Recording of the second album started on 1 August 2009, in Texas, US.

The first single was released on 5 October titled "Young Blood (Let It Out)", being released as a digital download single. Their second single "Matters At All" was released on 31 January 2010 and reached a peak of number 65 on the UK Singles Chart and also giving the band their first number 1 single on the UK Rock Chart.

Dirt was released on 29 March 2010. The digital special edition includes three bonus tracks: "Believer", "Reputation" and "When The World Comes Down".

On 2 May 2010, they embarked on their headline tour starting in Newcastle and finishing in Exeter on 14 May. On 23 May they played the In New Music We Trust stage at the Radio 1 Big Weekend in Bangor, North Wales. They were joined on stage by Frankie Sandford for "Undercover Lover" and Dev from Radio One for a cover version of "Jump". On 5 June 2010, the band were one of three supporting acts for Stereophonics at their gig at the Cardiff City Stadium.

They released the third single from album Dirt, "Undercover Lover", on 13 June, which featured Frankie Sandford on guest vocals from The Saturdays. The single proved successful when it reached number 62 on the UK Singles Chart, the highest placement of a Kids in Glass Houses' single besides "Give Me What I Want".

The band played June Reading & Leeds Festival 2010 on the NME/Radio 1 Stage. The band toured the UK in November 2010 supported by Boys Like Girls for the Dirt Tour Part II.

Kids in Glass Houses also supported Stereophonics at Belsonic, a music festival in Custom House Square, Belfast.

=== In Gold Blood (2011–2012) ===
In Kerrang! magazine, Aled Phillips was quoted as saying the band are going in a "radically different direction". He added "It'll be a concept record, a big, grown-up rock record. It's going to document a journey. I don't want to give too much away, but it's looking to be our most 'mature' album." Recording for the album began in March with producer Jason Perry. Frontman Aled Phillips also announced on his Twitter account that Kids in Glass Houses will be touring in September/October. Phillips later announced that the album would be released in late summer.

On 23 May 2011 the band announced that the title of their third studio album would be In Gold Blood. It was released on 15 August. The title track "Gold Blood" was released as a free download on 23 May, for a number of 4 days.

On 9 July, Kids in Glass Houses performed at Sonisphere Festival in Knebworth on the Saturn Stage, debuting two songs from In Gold Blood, with both the title track and new single "Animals" played as part of the set. The band was also noted for playing in costume for the first time, theming around Mad Max and American revolutionary attire.

In March 2011, the band released a fourth single from the album on 15 March, "Diamond Days". The release accompanied and promoted their support tour with You Me at Six. This tour ranged through March and April 2011. Iain Mahanty has stated that they had planned and have always wanted to do a tour with You Me at Six "We've talked about doing this for a few years, and for one reason or another, it never came to fruition. We're very excited, then, to finally be able to tour the UK with our good friends in You Me at Six".

=== Peace and break-up (2013–2014) ===
As of March 2013, Kids in Glass Houses were in a studio in Lincoln recording their fourth album, Peace. Recording of the album was completed towards the end of March. The first single, "Drive", was released on 21 July 2013. The album was released on 30 September 2013.

On 26 February 2014, the band announced their break-up and a farewell tour to commence 5 October playing all across the UK. Kids in Glass Houses played their final show on 31 October 2014 in the Great Hall, Cardiff to a capacity crowd.

Drummer Phillip Jenkins has since become the Touring Drummer for Welsh/American Alternative Rock Band, No Devotion, after former drummer Luke Johnson departed. Andrew "Shay" Sheehy has announced he will perform with A at Download Festival. Iain Mahanty has moved into film/TV scoring, announcing that he will compose the original soundtrack for the independent British horror film Strangers Within.

=== Reunion and Pink Flamingo (2022–present) ===
On 30 August 2022, it was announced that the band would be reuniting to perform two sets at Slam Dunk Festival 2023 celebrating 15 years of Smart Casual.

On 26 May 2023—and 15 years to the day that Smart Casual saw its release—the band announced its 15th Anniversary Edition. The album has been remixed and remastered by long-term collaborator and Grammy-Nominated Record Producer, Romesh Dodangoda, who recorded the album at his Long Wave Recording Studios in 2007. Pre-orders were launched on the band's website with the album available as a clear vinyl with redesigned pink artwork and a cassette. The album was released on Friday 13 October 2023.

After their triumphant return to a live setting at Slam Dunk Hatfield and Leeds was met with a rapturous response from both the crowd and the media, the band announced their first UK tour in 9 years. The tour, starting on 15 October 2023, will see the band visit Glasgow, Manchester, Birmingham, London and Bristol, before culminating with their much-anticipated return to their hometown of Cardiff. The Cardiff show sold out within 3 minutes of going on general sale.

In an interview conducted at Slam Dunk with Callum Crumlish from The Daily Express, bassist Andrew Sheehy alluded to the fact that the band had been working on new material but that no firm plans were in place to release new music. Sheehy explained:

"We never stopped working on new music. [Frontman] Aled [Phillips] and [guitarist] Iain [Mahanty] have written a lot of songs - we've got a ton of material. But, the beauty of where we are is we've got no obligation to do anything. If we feel that we want to put music out we can."

"It sounds really cheesy," he said. "But Aled has found his voice. He's confident in his own skin as a songwriter, I think. [The songs] are quite eclectic. Our music sounds closer to our first album than ever before, they're poppy, but they're great. There's some really heartfelt moments."

On 21 October 2023, the band revealed they were working on a fifth album, posting a photo of themselves on stage holding a sign saying "BRB... MAKING A NEW ALBUM!"

On 21 June 2024, Kids in Glass Houses released a new single titled "Theme From Pink Flamingo", which is the first taste of their upcoming fifth album, Pink Flamingo, scheduled for release in October 2024. The single showcases a new wavey and nostalgic synthy tone while retaining the catchy and dynamic feel of their earlier work. Vocalist Aled Phillips explained that the new album reflects both personal and societal changes since the band's hiatus, yet still captures the essence of Kids In Glass Houses.

Following this, the band released a second single, "Vulnerable", on 19 July 2024. According to Phillips, the song delves into the complexities of love, highlighting its beauty and the fearsome vulnerability it entails. Phillips elaborated that 'Vulnerable' comments on the changing dynamics of relationships in modern society, where instant gratification and disposability have led to unrealistic expectations and heightened anxiety. The track is also from the forthcoming Pink Flamingo, which was released on October 25, 2025, on Spotify

On 15 August 2024, a third single called "Rothko Painting" was released, along with a music video for it a week later which also doubles as a lyric video for the song.

On 20 September 2024, Phillips and Mahanty featured on Episode 304 of Sean Smith's (vocalist of The Blackout) Sappenin' podcast, and revealed that there would be a fourth single from Pink Flamingo released the following Friday, 27 September 2024, called "Have A Good Time".

== Band members ==
=== Current members ===
- Aled Phillips – vocals (2004–2014, 2022–present), guitar (2004–2005)
- Joel Fisher – guitar (2005–2014, 2022–present)
- Iain Mahanty – guitar (2006–2014, 2022–present)
- Andrew Shay – bass (2006–2014, 2022–present)
- Philip Jenkins – drums & percussion (2004–2014, 2022–present)

=== Former members ===
- Aled Rees – guitar (2005–2006)
- Earl Phillips – bass (2004–2006)

== Discography ==
=== Studio albums ===
List of studio albums, with selected details and chart positions
| Title | Album details | Peak chart positions |
| Title | Album details | UK |
|---|---|---|
| Smart Casual | Released: 26 May 2008; Label: Roadrunner; Formats: CD, download | 29 |
| Dirt | Released: 29 March 2010; Label: Roadrunner; Formats: CD, download | 27 |
| In Gold Blood | Released: 15 August 2011; Label: Roadrunner; Formats: CD, download | 27 |
| Peace | Released: 30 September 2013; Label: Transmission; Formats: CD, download | 39 |
| Pink Flamingo | Released: 25 October 2024; Label: Family Recipe; Formats: CD, download | 72 |

=== EPs ===
- The Things Bricks Say (When Your Back Is Turned) (2004)
- Trust Issues with Magicians (2005)
- E-Pocalypse! (2006)

=== Singles ===
List of singles, with selected chart positions
| Year | Single | Peak chart positions | Album |
| Year | Single | UK | Album |
|---|---|---|---|
| 2007 | "Me Me Me" | — | E-Pocalypse! |
| 2008 | "Easy Tiger" | 113 | Smart Casual |
| 2008 | "Give Me What I Want" | 62 | Smart Casual |
| 2008 | "Saturday" | 184 | Smart Casual |
| 2008 | "Fisticuffs" | — | Smart Casual |
| 2009 | "Youngblood (Let It Out)" | 151 | Dirt |
| 2010 | "Matters at All" | 65 | Dirt |
| 2010 | "Undercover Lover" (featuring Frankie Sandford) | 62 | Dirt |
| 2010 | "The Best Is Yet to Come" | — | Dirt |
| 2011 | "Gold Blood" | — | In Gold Blood |
| 2011 | "Animals" | — | In Gold Blood |
| 2011 | "Not in This World" | — | In Gold Blood |
| 2012 | "Diamond Days" | — | In Gold Blood |
| 2012 | "Secret Santa" | — | Non-album single |
| 2013 | "Drive" | — | Peace |
| 2013 | "Peace" | — | Peace |
| 2024 | "Theme From Pink Flamingo" | — | Pink Flamingo |
| 2024 | "Vulnerable" | — | Pink Flamingo |
| 2024 | "Rothko Painting" | — | Pink Flamingo |
| 2024 | "Have A Good Time" | — | Pink Flamingo |
"—" denotes releases that did not chart or were not released in that territory.

=== Videos ===
- "Easy Tiger" (2008)
- "Saturday" (2008)
- "Give Me What I Want" (2008)
- "Dance All Night" (2008)
- "Fisticuffs" (2008)
- "Young Blood (Let It Out)" (2009)
- "Matters at All" (2009)
- "Undercover Lover" (2010)
- "The Best Is Yet to Come" (2010)
- "Animals" (2011)
- "Not in This World" (2011)
- "Diamond Days" (2011)
- "Secret Santa" (2012)
- "Drive" (2013)
- "Peace" (2013)
- "Theme From Pink Flamingo” (2024)
- "Rothko Painting" (2024)
- "Have A Good Time" (2024)
