= Matters at All =

Single by Kids in Glass Houses

from the album Dirt
- Released: 29 January 2010
- Recorded: 2009
- Genre: Pop punk
- Length: 3:48 (single version); 3:50 (album version)
- Label: Roadrunner
- Songwriter(s): Jason Perry, Aled Phillips, Iain Mahanty, Joel Fisher, Andrew Shay, Philip Jenkins

Kids in Glass Houses singles chronology
"Youngblood (Let It Out)" (2009)	"Matters at All" (2010)	"Undercover Lover" (2010)

"Matters at All" is a song by Welsh rock band Kids in Glass Houses, and the second single to be taken from their second album Dirt. It was released on 29 January 2010, and peaked at number 65 on the UK Singles Chart and number one on the UK Rock Chart. The song also managed to receive placement on BBC Radio 1's A Playlist.

== Lyrics ==
When asked about the track, vocalist Aled Philips explained that the song is "about making things happen. It plays on the idea of having your time and making the most of it. A lot of the songs on the new album are about just playing what you're dealt and making the most of a good or bad situation."

== Chart performance ==
"Matters at All" debuted on the UK Singles Chart at number 70 on 28 March 2010. The following week, on 4 April 2010, the single climbed 5 places to its peak of number 65. The song also managed to top the UK Rock Chart, a first for the band. It spent a week at the top spot.

Chart performance for "Matters at All"
Chart (2010)	Peak position
UK Singles Chart	65
UK Rock Chart	1
