= Sorry's Not Good Enough / Friday Night =

2006 single by McFly

"Sorry's Not Good Enough" / "Friday Night"

Single by McFly

from the album Motion in the Ocean and Night at the Museum: The Soundtrack
- Released: 18 December 2006
- Length: 4:27 ("Sorry's Not Good Enough"); 3:22 ("Friday Night")
- Label: Island, Universal
- Songwriters: Tom Fletcher, Dougie Poynter, Danny Jones, Jason Perry, Julian Emery, Daniel P Carter
- Producers: Jason Perry, Julian Emery

McFly singles chronology
"Star Girl" (2006)	"Sorry's Not Good Enough" / "Friday Night" (2006)	"Baby's Coming Back" / "Transylvania" (2007)

"Sorry's Not Good Enough" and "Friday Night" are two songs by British pop rock band McFly from their third studio album, Motion in the Ocean. The songs were issued as a double A-side single on 18 December 2006, serving as the album's third single. It peaked at No. 3 on the UK Singles Chart after entering the chart at No. 98 on download sales alone. "Friday Night" is the main theme for the film Night at the Museum (2006), appearing on both the soundtrack and in the movie itself. Videos for both tracks were recorded, with the video for "Sorry's Not Good Enough" appearing on the DVD single, and the video for "Friday Night" appearing on the DVD release of Night at the Museum.

== Music videos ==
=== "Sorry's Not Good Enough" ===
During the video, Tom is seen eating a meal with a girl (Sai Bennett) while the rest of the band play the song. As the video progresses, it is revealed that the restaurant in which the couple eat is actually just a set up and that the girl has her wrists fastened to the table with duct tape and her legs tied to the chair with duct tape leaving her unable to leave Tom. Then a video about the happy times when the two were together is projected on the wall. Tom takes the girl's hand and she starts to cry, but secretly manages to pull off the tape. When the video stops, she stands up and opens her arms, like she wants to hug Tom. But when he comes over to her, she kicks him and leaves the room.

=== "Friday Night" ===
"Friday Night" is featured in the movie Night at the Museum starring Ben Stiller, Owen Wilson, Robin Williams, and British comedians Ricky Gervais and Steve Coogan. It was released in North America on 22 December 2006, and in UK cinemas on Boxing Day, 26 December 2006. The video, shot with various handheld cameras, features the band members as security guards at the British Museum of Natural History, and then running around London.

== Track listings ==
UK CD single

1. "Sorry's Not Good Enough"
2. "Friday Night"
3. "Rockin' Robin"
4. "Sorry's Not Good Enough" (live version)
5. "Sorry's Not Good Enough" (live video)
- A sticker on the front of the case labels this as CD1; however, there is no CD2. The paper inlay sleeve confirms there is only one CD, as instead of having 'CD1'/'CD2' written on the spine like other McFly releases, it simply has 'CD'.

UK DVD single

1. "Sorry's Not Good Enough" (audio)
2. "Friday Night" (audio)
3. "Motion in the Ocean Tour Movie"
4. "Sorry's Not Good Enough" (video)
5. "Album Launch Party" (video)

== Charts ==
Chart (2006)	Peak position
Ireland (IRMA)	29
Scotland Singles (OCC)	5
UK Singles (OCC)	3
