= Undercover Lover =

Single by Kids in Glass Houses featuring Frankie Sandford

from the album Dirt
- Released: 14 June 2010
- Recorded: 2009
- Genre: Pop punk
- Length: 2:59 (single version); 4:28 (album version)
- Label: Roadrunner
- Songwriters: Aled Phillips, Iain Mahanty, Joel Fisher, Andrew Shay, Philip Jenkins, Jason Perry

Kids in Glass Houses singles chronology
"Matters at All" (2010)	"Undercover Lover" (2010)	"The Best Is Yet to Come" (2010)

Frankie Sandford singles chronology
"Undercover Lover" (2010)

"Undercover Lover" is a song by Welsh rock band Kids In Glass Houses, serving as the third single from their second album, Dirt. The single features The Saturdays singer Frankie Sandford and was released as a digital download on 13 June 2010 with the CD single released the following day.

== Background ==
The song features The Saturdays singer Frankie Sandford. The track is about two people (Frankie Sandford and Aled Phillips in the music video) are secretly in love with one another, but do not want to show it.

Sandford and Phillips in the music video.

== Chart performance ==
After receiving strong radio airplay throughout May 2010, "Undercover Lover" debuted on the UK Singles Chart at number 161 on 30 May 2010 before climbing to number 119 on its second week on the chart. The single then climbed to number 76 on its third week in the chart, before climbing 14 places to its current peak of number 62 upon physical release on 20 June 2010, marking the band's most successful single alongside "Give Me What I Want"' which also reached number 62 in May 2008.

== Charts ==
Chart performance for "Undercover Lover"
Chart (2010)	Peak position
UK Singles (Official Charts)	62
