= Motion in the Ocean =

- Standard artwork

Studio album by McFly
- Released: 6 November 2006
- Recorded: 2005–2006
- Genre: Pop-punk, sunshine pop
- Length: 42:53
- Label: Island
- Producer: Julian Emery, Jason Perry

McFly chronology
Wonderland (2005)	Motion in the Ocean (2006)	Radio:Active (2008)

Singles from Motion in the Ocean
- 1. "Don't Stop Me Now / Please, Please" Released: 17 July 2006; 2. "Star Girl" Released: 23 October 2006; 3. "Sorry's Not Good Enough/Friday Night" Released: 18 December 2006; 4. "Baby's Coming Back/Transylvania" Released: 7 May 2007

Professional ratings
Review scores
Source	Rating
AllMusic	3/5 stars
The Guardian	3/5 stars
musicOMH	4/5 stars

Motion in the Ocean is the third studio album released by English pop rock band McFly. The album was released in the United Kingdom on 6 November 2006. The album has sold more than 300,000 copies in the UK since its release, being certified platinum. The tour edition of the album was released on 14 May 2007. Alongside the addition of bonus track "Baby's Coming Back", the album was accompanied by a DVD of the Motion in the Ocean Tour 2006, recorded live at Wembley Arena. The album was a limited edition. This version of the album reached number fourteen on the official album chart, selling 11,256 copies.

== Background ==
The album was recorded in the Grouse Lodge recording studio in Westmeath, Ireland. The album's first song, "We Are The Young", first featured as a demo B-side to the single "Star Girl". This version is slightly different, with stronger piano riffs. "Please Please" contains obvious references to actress Lindsay Lohan, who drummer Harry Judd met on the set of Lohan's movie Just My Luck, in which McFly made an appearance. Lohan is not mentioned specifically, but the woman featured in the video for the song has green eyes, red hair, and is named Lindsay. The name tag on her nurse's uniform also says "Lindsay Allbright" – Lohan's character in Just My Luck was named "Ashley Allbright." The band's official position, as stated in the album notes, is that the song is not about Lohan.

== Singles ==
- The double A-side of "Don't Stop Me Now / Please, Please" was released as the album's lead single on 17 July 2006. It charted at number one on the UK Singles Chart. The single became the official single for Sport Relief 2006.
- "Star Girl" was released as the album's second single on 23 October 2006. It also went to number one on the UK Singles Chart, selling more than 58,000 copies in its first week.
- The double A-side of "Sorry's Not Good Enough/Friday Night" was released as the album's third single on 18 December 2006. It reached number three on the Christmas charts.
- The double A-side of "Baby's Coming Back/Transylvania" was released as the album's fourth and final single on 7 May 2007. It also reached number one on the UK Singles Chart.

== Track listing ==
Motion in the Ocean - Standard edition
No.	Title	Writer(s)	Length
1.	"We Are the Young"	Fletcher; Jones; Poynter; Judd; Julian Emery; Jason Perry; James Bourne	3:54
2.	"Star Girl"	Fletcher; Jones; Poynter; Judd; Emery; Perry; Daniel P. Carter	3:28
3.	"Please, Please"	Fletcher; Jones; Poynter; Judd; Perry	3:09
4.	"Sorry's Not Good Enough"	Fletcher; Jones; Poynter; Emery; Jason Perry	4:27
5.	"Bubble Wrap"	Fletcher	5:12
6.	"Transylvania"	Fletcher; Poynter	4:10
7.	"Lonely"	Fletcher; Bourne	3:52
8.	"Little Joanna"	Fletcher; Jones; Poynter	3:56
9.	"Friday Night"	Fletcher; Jones; Poynter; Perry; Carter	3:22
10.	"Walk in the Sun"	Fletcher; Jones	4:35
11.	"Home Is Where the Heart Is"	Fletcher; Jones; Perry	4:31
Total length:			42:53

Motion in the Ocean UK/Japan bonus track
No.	Title	Writer(s)	Length
12.	"Don't Stop Me Now"	Freddie Mercury	3:20
13.	"Silence Is a Scary Sound" (live hidden track)	Poynter	3:23
Total length:			43:44

Motion in the Ocean tour edition
No.	Title	Writer(s)	Length
8.	"Don't Stop Me Now"	Freddie Mercury	3:20
9.	"Little Joanna"	Fletcher; Jones; Poynter; Matthew Fletcher	3:56
10.	"Friday Night"	Fletcher; Jones; Perry; Emery; Poynter; Carter	3:22
11.	"Walk in the Sun"	Fletcher; Jones	4:35
12.	"Home Is Where the Heart Is"	Fletcher; Jones; Perry	4:31
13.	"Baby's Coming Back"	Andy Sturmer	2:59
14.	"Silence Is a Scary Sound" (live hidden track)	Fletcher; Poynter	3:23
Total length:			59:20

Motion in the Ocean tour edition DVD: Live at Wembley Arena
No.	Title	Length
1.	"Please, Please"
2.	"I Wanna Hold You"
3.	"All About You"
4.	"We Are the Young"
5.	"Medley (Surfer Babe/Down By the Lake/That Girl/She Left Me)"
6.	"Star Girl"
7.	"I'll Be OK"
8.	"Sorry's Not Good Enough"
9.	"Fight for Your Right"
10.	"Not Alone"
11.	"Room on the Third Floor"
12.	"Ghostbusters"
13.	"I've Got You"
14.	"Obviously"
15.	"Don't Stop Me Now" (featuring Matt Willis)
16.	"Five Colours in Her Hair"

== Charts and certifications ==
=== Charts ===
Chart performance for Motion in the Ocean
Chart (2006)	Peak position
European Albums Chart	23
Irish Albums (IRMA)	23
Japanese Albums (Oricon)	89
Scottish Albums (OCC)	4
South Korean Albums (Gaon)	71
UK Albums (OCC)	6

=== Certifications ===
Certifications for Motion in the Ocean
Region	Certification	Certified units/sales
United Kingdom (BPI)	Platinum	300,000^{‡}
^{‡} Sales+streaming figures based on certification alone.
