= In Gold Blood =

Studio album by Kids in Glass Houses
- Released: 15 August 2011
- Genre: Pop rock, pop punk, alternative rock
- Length: 41:00
- Label: Roadrunner
- Producer: Jason Perry

Kids in Glass Houses chronology
Dirt (2010)	In Gold Blood (2011)	Peace (2013)

Singles from In Gold Blood
- 1. "Gold Blood" Released: 5 June 2011; 2. "Animals" Released: 7 August 2011; 3. "Not in This World" Released: 24 October 2011; 4. "Diamond Days" Released: 19 March 2012

In Gold Blood is the third studio album from Welsh alternative rock band Kids in Glass Houses, released on 15 August 2011 through Roadrunner Records. Kids in Glass houses released the first single off the album, "Gold Blood" on 5 June.

== Release and promotion ==
Kids in Glass Houses used viral marketing methods to promote the album, uploading individual tracks online for free download. The first song released for free download was the title track "Gold Blood" on 20 May, demand for the free download was so high that their website crashed. On 16 June 2011 the band revealed both the album art and the full track listing of the album. The second single "Animals" was released as a digital single on 7 August. The fourth single released from the album was Diamond Days and was released on 19 March.

== Lyrical themes ==
Kids in Glass Houses had often said in the announcement and the follow-up to the release of In Gold Blood that it is to be a concept record. Aled Phillips had stated that it is: "a concept record, a big, grown-up record. It's going to document a journey". Differing significantly from their previous albums as stated by Phillips as it does not, in his own words, involve "free-for-all tangent-laden lyrical assault" The album uses a narrative of two different characters living in a Mad Max-inspired world. Phillips intricately describes the concepts as: "They are caught between different systems and beliefs at war with each other and the album is their attempt to find a way through that. There are plenty of negative sentiments but there is an optimism in the songs too, they might not make it through together but they do come out the other side." Phillips has cited the concept albums of My Chemical Romance and Born to Run byBruce Springsteen as primary influences on the work.

== Reception ==
=== Singles ===
"Gold Blood" was released as the album's lead single on 5 June 2011. "Animals" was released on 7 August 2011 as the album's second single. On 17 September 2011 "Not in This World" was announced as the third single with a release date of 24 October 2011.

=== Critical reception ===
Professional ratings
Review scores
Source	Rating
AllMusic	3.5/5 stars
BBC Music	(favorable)
Big Cheese	5/5 stars
Drowned in Sound	5/10
The Fly	3.5/5 stars
Kerrang!	4/5 stars
Media Essentials	4/5 stars
Punktastic	4/5 stars
Rock Louder	4/5
Rock Sound	9/10
This Is Fake DIY	8/10

In Gold Blood received critical acclaim upon its release. Many reviewers has stated In Gold Blood possesses a clear sign of progression and showing the band writing more album oriented rock. Rocksound gave it exceptional praise, saying "It's the absolute meeting point of a band's potential and their promise, and it has come at the perfect time in their career. Well done Kids in Glass Houses - you've surprised even us. Tom Aylott from Punktastic.com said "The next big question for the band will be on how to progress next, but fortunately that's a question they won't have to answer for a while and they can rest easy knowing 'In Gold Blood' is everything they wanted to be, even if it rubs a few up the wrong way." Sean Dyer of Media Essentials also commented on how the sound of the album will receive mixed opinion from Kids in Glass Houses' fanbase; saying: "No doubt this record will go over some of KIGH’s fans but most will appreciate this sound and drive to achieve something new and different."

== Track listing ==
No.	Title	Length
1.	"Gold Blood"	3:28
2.	"Teenage Wonderland"	3:35
3.	"Diamond Days"	3:48
4.	"Not in This World"	4:03
5.	"The Florist"	4:11
6.	"Animals"	3:53
7.	"Only the Brave Die Free"	3:36
8.	"Annie May"	3:51
9.	"Fire"	4:17
10.	"Black Crush"	3:31
11.	"A God to Many Devils"	4:47
Total length:		41:00

iTunes bonus track version
No.	Title	Length
12.	"Nobody's Waiting" (Demo)	3:15
13.	"Enough for You" (Demo)	3:31
14.	"Gold Blood" (Music Video)	2:50
15.	"Animals" (Music Video)	3:34
16.	"In Gold Blood - About the Album" (Video Documentary)	15:15
Total length:		1:08:45

== Charts ==
Chart (2011)	Peak position
UK Albums Chart	27
UK Download Albums Chart	28
UK Rock Albums Chart	1
Scottish Albums Chart	21
