= Smart Casual =

Studio album by Kids in Glass Houses
- Released: 26 May 2008 (UK)
- Recorded: October–December 2007
- Studio: Long Wave Studios, Wales
- Genre: Pop punk, alternative rock, indie rock
- Length: 39:43
- Label: Roadrunner
- Producer: Romesh Dodangoda

Kids in Glass Houses chronology
E-Pocalypse! (2006)	Smart Casual (2008)	Dirt (2010)

Singles from Smart Casual
- 1. "Easy Tiger" Released: 10 March 2008; 2. "Give Me What I Want" Released: 19 May 2008; 3. "Saturday" Released: 11 August 2008; 4. "Fisticuffs" Released: 3 November 2008

Professional ratings
Review scores
Source	Rating
Absolutepunk.net	86% link
In the News	7.5/10 link
Kerrang!	4/5 stars
Q	2/5 stars

Smart Casual is the debut album from Kids in Glass Houses, recorded during late 2007 at Long Wave Studios with Romesh Dodangoda. The album contains songs the band have written since the release of their five-track EP "E-Pocalypse!", and also three tracks from the EP.

The lead single from the album is "Easy Tiger" and was released on 10 March 2008. It was released as a digital download, and on a limited pressing of 2000 vinyl. The music video for the single received considerable plays on music channels. "Give Me What I Want" was also released as a single on 19 May, followed by "Saturday" on 11 August.

The album entered the UK charts at and charted at number 29 on the week of its release.

The song "Girls" is used as the theme song for Totally Calum Best: The Best Is Yet To Come. The song "Raise Hell" was formerly known as "My Def Posse" and still referred to by some fans.

A Special Edition release included a bonus DVD.

== Track listing ==
All tracks written by Aled Phillips, Iain Mahanty, Joel Fisher, Andrew Shay and Philip Jenkins unless otherwise stated. All lyrics by Aled Phillips.

No.	Title	Writer(s)	Length
1.	"Fisticuffs"		2:55
2.	"Easy Tiger"	Aled Phillips, Earl Phillips	3:32
3.	"Give Me What I Want"	Aled Phillips, Aled Rees, Joel Fisher, Andrew Shay, Phillip Jenkins	3:19
4.	"Saturday"	Aled Phillips, Joel Fisher, Andrew Shay, Phillip Jenkins	3:18
5.	"Lovely Bones"		3:25
6.	"Shameless"	Aled Phillips, Joel Fisher, Andrew Shay, Phillip Jenkins	3:38
7.	"Girls"		3:20
8.	"Good Boys Gone Rad"		2:59
9.	"Dance All Night"		3:15
10.	"Pillow Talk"		3:09
11.	"Raise Hell"	Aled Phillips	3:51
12.	"Church Tongue"		3:04
Total length:			39:43

== Personnel ==
- Aled Phillips – lead vocals, lyrics
- Iain Mahanty – lead guitar, backing vocals
- Joel Fisher – rhythm guitar
- Andrew Shay – bass guitar
- Phil Jenkins – drums, percussion

== Certifications ==
Country	Certification	Sales
United Kingdom	Silver	88,908
