= Agua Maldita =

Studio album by Molotov
- Released: June 10, 2014
- Recorded: November 2013 – February 2014
- Length: 33:28
- Label: Universal Music Mexico
- Producer: Jason Perry

Molotov chronology
Desde Rusia con Amor (2012)	Agua Maldita (2014)	MTV Unplugged: El Desconecte (2018)

Agua Maldita is Molotov's seventh album, which was released June 10, 2014. It is the band's first studio album since Eternamiente, released in 2007. At the Latin Grammy Awards of 2014, the album won the award for Best Rock Album.

== Track list ==
No.	Title	Writer(s)	Length
1.	"Oleré y Oleré y Oleré el UHU"	Miguel Angel Huidobro	2:50
2.	"La Raza Pura es la Pura Raza" (with Darryl "D.M.C." McDaniels)	Randy Ebright, Huidobro, Darryl McDaniels, Jason Perry	3:10
3.	"Fuga"	Ismael Fuentes, Ebright	2:23
4.	"La Necesidad"	Ebright, Perry	4:01
5.	"No Existe"	Fuentes	3:32
6.	"Llorari"	Francisco Ayala, Perry	3:32
7.	"Again n' Again" (with Darryl "D.M.C." McDaniels)	Ebright, McDaniel, Perry	3:50
8.	"Gonner"	Fuentes	2:51
9.	"Lagunas Metales"	Huidobro, Perry	3:53
10.	"Quien Se Enoja Pierde"	Ebright, Perry	3:26
Total length:			33:28
