= Dirt (Kids in Glass Houses album) =

Studio album by Kids in Glass Houses
- Released: 29 March 2010
- Recorded: Mid 2009 at Sonic Ranch, Texas, United States; Long Wave, UK
- Genres: Alternative rock, indie rock, pop punk
- Length: 48:21
- Label: Roadrunner
- Producer: Jason Perry Romesh Dodangoda

Kids in Glass Houses chronology
Smart Casual (2008)	Dirt (2010)	In Gold Blood (2011)

Singles from Dirt
- 1. "Youngblood (Let It Out)" Released: 4 October 2009; 2. "Matters at All" Released: 31 January 2010; 3. "Undercover Lover" Released: 14 June 2010; 4. "The Best Is Yet To Come" Released: 31 October 2010

Dirt is the second studio album from Welsh rock band Kids in Glass Houses, released on 29 March 2010 through Roadrunner Records. The album was recorded during mid-2009 at Sonic Boom Ranch Studios in Texas with Jason Perry and at Long Wave Studios in Wales with Smart Casual producer Romesh Dodangoda. The lead single from the album was "Young Blood (Let It Out)" and was released on 4 October 2009. The second single from the album is "Matters At All" and was released on 31 January 2010.

The track "Hunt The Haunted" was released as a free download on 8 January 2010. The entire album was available to stream on their MySpace page for a limited time.

The album reached No. 15 on the UK midweek chart 2 days after its release and officially charted in its first week at No. 27 selling 8,400.

== Track listing ==
No.	Title	Writer(s)	Length
1.	"Artbreaker I"	Kids in Glass Houses	2:30
2.	"The Best Is Yet to Come"	Kids in Glass Houses, Jason Perry	3:39
3.	"Sunshine"	Kids in Glass Houses, Jason Perry	3:43
4.	"Matters at All"	Kids in Glass Houses, Jason Perry	3:51
5.	"Youngblood (Let It Out)"	Kids in Glass Houses, Jason Perry	3:33
6.	"Lilli Rose"	Kids in Glass Houses	3:28
7.	"Giving Up"	Kids in Glass Houses	4:33
8.	"For Better or Hearse"	Kids in Glass Houses	3:11
9.	"Undercover Lover" (featuring Frankie Sandford of The Saturdays)	Kids in Glass Houses, Jason Perry	4:29
10.	"Maybe Tomorrow" (featuring New Found Glory)	Kids in Glass Houses	3:08
11.	"The Morning Afterlife"	Kids in Glass Houses	5:47
12.	"Hunt the Haunted"	Kids in Glass Houses	3:45
13.	"Artbreaker II"	Kids in Glass Houses	2:42

Digital release bonus tracks
No.	Title	Length
14.	"Believer" (Long Wave Sessions)	3:01
15.	"Reputation" (Long Wave Sessions)	3:14
16.	"When the World Comes Down" (Long Wave Sessions)	3:04

Japanese release bonus track
No.	Title	Length
14.	"Historia"

== Reception ==
Professional ratings
Review scores
Source	Rating
BBC	(favourable)
Drowned in Sound	5/10 stars
Kerrang!	4/5 stars
NME	5/10 stars
Rock Sound	7/10 stars
This Is Fake DIY	7/10 stars
Yahoo! Music	7/10 stars

The reception for this album has been mixed to positive This Is Fake DIY gave a positive review stating "Will it equal ‘Smart Casual's success in the charts? No: it will eclipse it. Believe us when we say that this lot have a potential top 10 smash on their hands, and there is a real possibility of the new album blowing a hole in the wall if enough people catch on."

BBC's Mike Diver gave another positive review by saying "Dirt is poised to take them from support slots with Lostprophets and Paramore to headline performances at the nation's larger venues.". And praised the album and the band more by stating like many others have "But the overall progression from record one to two is impressive and "As another highlight sings: "the best is yet to come."

NME mostly criticized the album for the guest performers, saying that "those two death-by-cringe tracks unravel (Undercover Lover and Maybe Tomorrow)" but had certain praise calling it an "impressive attempt".

== In popular culture ==
The song "The Best Is Yet to Come" is featured in the video game F1 2010.

== Personnel ==
Kids in Glass Houses

- Aled Phillips – lead vocals
- Joel Fisher – rhythm guitar
- Iain Mahanty – lead guitar, backing vocals
- Andrew Shay – bass guitar
- Phil Jenkins – drums, percussion

Additional Personnel

- Romesh Dodangoda – production on "Hunt the Haunted", engineering on "The Best Is Yet to Come", "Lilli Rose", "Giving Up", "For Better or Hearse", "Undercover Lover", "Maybe Tomorrow", "The Morning Afterlife" and "Hunt the Haunted"
- Craig Hardy – programming on all tracks
- Ted Jensen – mastering on all tracks
- John Mitchell – mixing on all tracks, piano on "The Morning Afterlife"
- Michael Morgan – engineering on all tracks except "Hunt the Haunted"
- New Found Glory – vocals on "Maybe Tomorrow"
  - Cyrus Bolooki
  - Chad Gilbert
  - Ian Grushka
  - Steve Klein
  - Jordan Pundik
- Jason Perry – programming, production on all tracks except "Hunt the Haunted", engineering on all tracks except "Hunt the Haunted"
- Frankie Sandford – vocals on "Undercover Lover"
- 4Strings+ – strings on "The Morning Afterlife", brass on "For Better or Hearse"
  - Jake Everitt-Crockford – violin
  - Alison Donnelly – violin
  - Rachael Elliot – violin
  - Sarah Elstone – violin
  - Katherine Evans – violin
  - Andy Everton – trumpet
  - Lizzie French – violin
  - Jennifer Grieve – cello
  - James Grindle – viola
  - Lizzie Harris – cello
  - Jo Lihou – violin
  - Barbara Lowenberg – violin
  - Neil Martin – trumpet
  - Azita Mehdinejad – violin
  - Clara Pascall – cello
  - Roz Pilgrim – viola
  - Louisa Rich – violin
  - Jessica Rochman – violin
  - Kay Russant – violin
  - Claire Sanderson – viola
  - Hannah Simmons – violin
  - Alex Tyson – viola
  - Yonathan Van den Brink – viola
  - Rachel Williams – cello
