= Exit Stage Right =

Live album by A
- Released: 8 August 2000
- Recorded: September 1999 – March 2000
- Genre: Alternative rock, pop rock, hard rock
- Length: 25:12
- Label: London Records
- Producer: Jason Perry

A chronology
'A' vs. Monkey Kong (1999)	Exit Stage Right (2000)	Hi-Fi Serious (2002)

Professional ratings
Review scores
Source	Rating
Kerrang!	4/5 stars

Exit Stage Right is a live album by British alternative rock band A, released in 2000 on London Records. It reached #3 on the UK Indie Chart. The title is a parody of Rush's 1981 live album Exit...Stage Left.

== Track listing ==
All songs written by Jason Perry

1. "Intro" - 0:24
2. "If it Ain't Broke, Fix it Anyway" - 2:32
  Recorded live in Munich, Germany, February 2000
3. "Monkey Kong" - 3:44
  Recorded live in Los Angeles, CA, United States, March 2000
4. "A" - 3:27
  Recorded live at the London Astoria, UK, January 2000
5. "Old Folks" - 4:01
  Recorded live in Frankfurt, Germany, February 2000
6. "I Love Lake Tahoe" - 4:51
  Recorded live in Zurich, Switzerland, February 2000
7. "Over It" - 1:43
  Recorded live in Frankfurt, Germany, February 2000
8. "Foghorn" - 4:30
  Recorded live in Lisbon, Vans Warped Tour, September 1999
