= The Molotovs =

English rock band

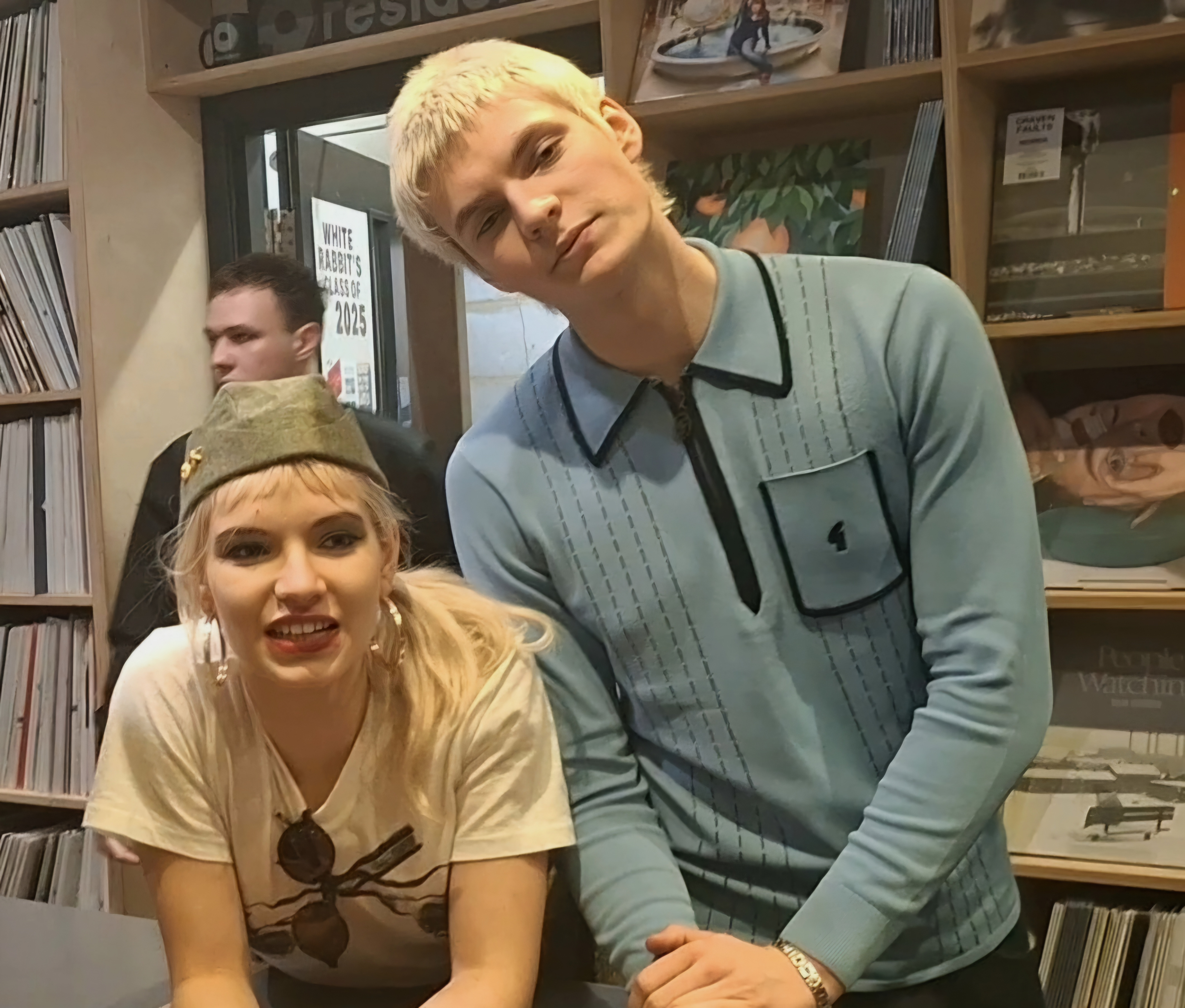
- Members Issey Cartlidge (left) and Mathew Cartlidge (right) photographed in Brighton in January 2026

Background information
- Origin: London, England
- Genres: Punk rock, mod revival, indie rock
- Years active: 2020–present
- Label: Marshall
- Members: Mathew Cartlidge; Issey Cartlidge; Noah Riley
- Past members: Ice Dob; Will Fooks

The Molotovs are an English rock band from London. It consists of teenage siblings Matt and Issey Cartlidge. In 2026 they released their debut album Wasted on Youth.

== Career ==
The band was formed in 2020 and initially consisted of siblings Mathew Cartlidge (vocals, guitar) and Issey Cartlidge (bass, vocals), as well as drummer Ice Dob. Originally called The Mocktales, they adopted their current name a year later, which refers both to the Molotov cocktail and, according to Mathew Cartlidge, to the band's "rebellious energy". Mathew and Issey Cartlidge had previously played in various bands. With all concert venues closed due to the COVID-19 pandemic, The Molotovs played their first gigs on streets and in parks across London. This allowed them to circumvent the age restrictions of some clubs. Through 2024, they had a residency at the Spice of Life in Soho. On May 10th 2024, they were joined on stage at London’s Bush Hall by Sex Pistols drummer Paul Cook, playing ‘God Save the Queen’. By January 2025, the band had played over 500 gigs, including opening for The Libertines, Blondie, Iggy Pop and The Damned.

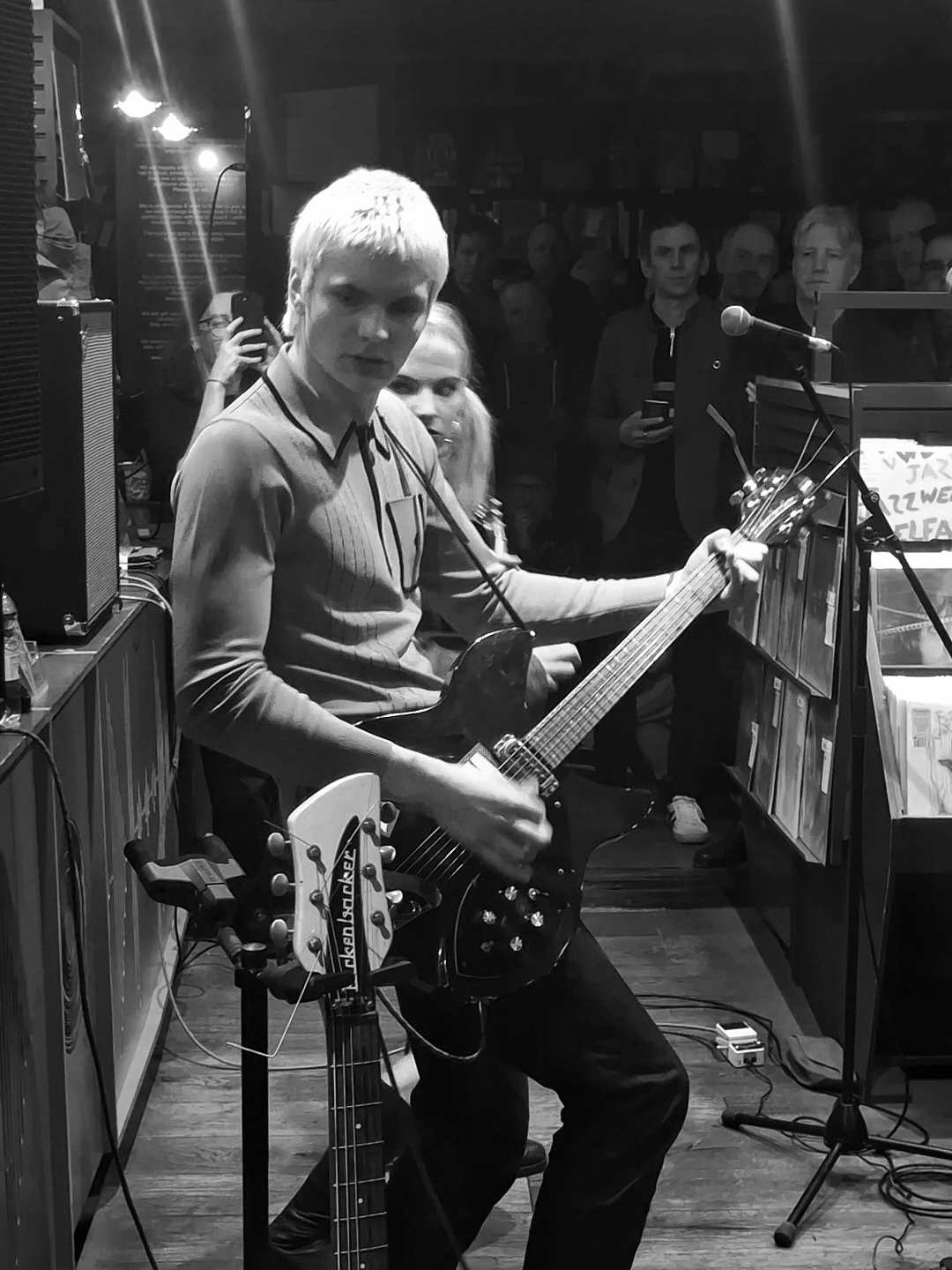
The Molotovs performing at Resident Records in 2026, photographed by Levi Woodbridge.

In January 2025, The Molotovs were signed by Marshall Records. In the meantime, Ice Dob had left the band and was replaced by Will Fooks. On 25 March 2025, the band released their debut single, "More More More". The day before, The Molotovs opened for the Sex Pistols at the Royal Albert Hall. In the autumn of that year, they embarked on a North American tour supporting the Sex Pistols. On 30 January 2026, the band announced their debut album Wasted on Youth, produced by Jason Perry. The album reached number three on the UK Albums Chart. Simultaneously, the band toured small, independent clubs in the United Kingdom. A tour with The Warning, supporting Yungblud, is planned for April 2026. On 21 March 2026, The Molotovs performed Today’s Gonna Be Our Day on The Jonathan Ross Show. In September 2026, they will launch their Welcome To Urbia tour.

== Style ==
Singer Mathew Cartlidge cited the Sex Pistols, The Jam, Green Day, The Kinks, The Specials, Small Faces, Oasis, Pulp, Sports Team and The Libertines as some of the band's biggest influences. His band's aim was to reflect their adoration of the New Wave/Mod revival of the late 1970s and early 1980s. Nick Linazasoro of the Brighton and Hove News described the band's music as "short, sharp bursts of well-crafted, catchy guitar pop". Eric Meyer of the German magazine Plattentests.de described the Molotovs' music as "a hardly surprising, but robustly explosive bag of fresh punk 'n' roll" that has "seventies UK rock in its wake," plus "a dash of snotty early Arctic Monkeys and a bit of Green Day stadium punk".

== Discography ==
=== Albums ===
Title	Details	Peak chart positions
Title	Details	UK
Wasted on Youth	Released: 30 January 2026; Label: Marshall	3

=== Singles ===
- "More More More" / "Suffragette City" (live from London, 2025)
- "Today's Gonna Be Our Day" / "No Time to Talk" (2025)
- "Rhythm of Yourself" / "Johnny Don't Be Scared" (2025)
- "Get a Life" (2026)
- "Urbia" (2026)
