= EmuBands =

Digital music service

EmuBands Ltd
- Company type: Private
- Industry: Music
- Founded: 2005
- Founder: Ally Gray; Matt Kennedy
- Headquarters: Glasgow, United Kingdom
- Area served: Worldwide
- Products: Online Delivery (Music)
- Services: Digital music distribution
- Website: EmuBands Website

EmuBands is a digital music distribution service founded in 2005 and headquartered in Glasgow, Scotland. It provides a platform for self-releasing artists and independent record labels to distribute their music across various digital streaming platforms, including Spotify, Apple Music, Amazon Music, Deezer, and Tidal.

== Overview ==
EmuBands offers distribution for musicians and labels to get their music online while retaining full ownership and control of their rights. The service operates on a one-time fee basis for distribution of releases with additional features and services available through optional subscription plans. The company offers customer support in English and Spanish.

== Services ==
In addition to its core digital music distribution platform, EmuBands offers a range of supplementary services through optional subscription packages, which are designed to complement its core offering. These services include:

- Playlist Pitching: Facilitates the submission of music to playlist curators, aiming to increase the visibility and reach of artists' releases on major streaming platforms.
- Automated Royalty Payment Splitting Tools: Provides tools designed to automate the allocation and distribution of royalties among multiple rights holders, streamlining the payment process.
- Personal Account Managers: Subscribers gain access to dedicated account managers who offer support and guidance throughout the distribution process, assisting with inquiries and technical issues.
- Instant Mastering: Offers instant mastering services to optimize the audio quality of music releases for digital distribution.
- Real-Time Support Through Live Chat: Provides real-time assistance to users via live chat, offering prompt responses to inquiries and technical issues.
- Pre-Save Link Creation: Artists have the ability to generate pre-save links for their upcoming releases, allowing fans to save the music to their libraries ahead of its official release date.

These services are available to subscribers seeking additional support and features beyond EmuBands' basic distribution offering.

== Recognition ==
EmuBands is recognized as a 'Preferred Provider' by Spotify, achieving 'Platinum' level status within the Preferred Provider Programme. This recognition grants EmuBands customers access to additional benefits, including instant access to Spotify for Artists. Spotify's Preferred Providers are selected based on their adherence to high standards for quality metadata and anti-infringement measures.

== Industry engagement ==
Employees of EmuBands have appeared on panels for seminars and conferences such as The Great Escape Festival, Wide Days, BIME Pro, and LPA Music Studio. EmuBands is a member of Merlin Network, the Association of Independent Music, and the Scottish Music Industry Association.

In April 2020, EmuBands supported the launch of a Covid-19 Crisis Fund for freelancers and contractors working within the music industry facing hardship due to lost work as a result of the Covid-19 pandemic. The fund was managed by the Association of Independent Music (AIM). EmuBands supported the fund in conjunction with a number of AIM members, including Beggars Group, Cherry Red Records, Elephant Music, Ninja Tune, Phonographic Performance Limited, Sega Bodega, Specific Music and SRLV.

EmuBands worked with the Association of Independent Music and Secretly Canadian to launch AIM's free associate membership tier, available to clients of distributor members of AIM.

== Controversies ==
=== Global removal of "Glory to Hong Kong" on streaming platforms ===
On 24 May 2024, the song "Glory to Hong Kong" was taken off streaming platforms such as Apple Music and Spotify around the world, with the distributor citing Hong Kong's ban on the song. DGX Music said they opposed its removal and the injunction does not have extraterritorial jurisdiction. DGX Music also said the song itself is not banned by the Hong Kong Government.

== Notable artists and labels ==
Notable artists & record labels who have utilized EmuBands for music distribution include:

- Angus & Julia Stone
- Bombay Bicycle Club
- Caribou
- Dermot Kennedy
- Eric Prydz
- Ghost
- Lewisham and Greenwich NHS Choir
- Lost Map Records
- Rednex
- Simple Minds
- Ten Tonnes
- The Academic
- The Reytons
- Tide Lines
- Tom Robinson
