= Baby's Coming Back / Transylvania =

"Baby's Coming Back" / "Transylvania"

Single by McFly

from the album Motion in the Ocean
- Released: 7 May 2007
- Length: 2:50 ("Baby's Coming Back"); 4:07 ("Transylvania")
- Label: Island
- Songwriters: Andy Sturmer ("Baby's Coming Back"); Tom Fletcher, Dougie Poynter ("Transylvania")
- Producer: Jason Perry ("Transylvania")

McFly singles chronology
"Sorry's Not Good Enough" / "Friday Night" (2006)	"Baby's Coming Back" / "Transylvania" (2007)	"The Heart Never Lies" (2007)

"Baby's Coming Back" and "Transylvania" are two songs by English pop rock band McFly, released together as a double A-side single on 7 May 2007. "Baby's Coming Back" is a cover of a song originally written and performed by the American power pop band Jellyfish in 1990, while "Transylvania" is an original by McFly. "Transylvania" was included on the first release of McFly's third studio album, Motion in the Ocean (2006), while "Baby's Coming Back" was added to the tour edition.

The single debuted at number one on the UK Singles Chart but fell to number 20 the following week, setting the record for the biggest drop-off number one until 2016, when "A Bridge over You" by the Lewisham and Greenwich NHS Choir fell to number 29 from the top spot.

== Background ==
It was originally announced that "Transylvania", written by Tom Fletcher and Dougie Poynter and produced by Jason Perry, would be released by itself, before the announcement of a further double A-side was made on 20 March 2007. "Baby's Coming Back" is a cover of the 1991 Jellyfish song. The pipe organ introduction to "Transylvania" is the opening of Johann Sebastian Bach's Toccata and Fugue in D minor.

The B-side is a live recording cover of the Beastie Boys song "Fight for Your Right".

== Music videos ==
=== "Baby's Coming Back" ===
The official video is like their previous song, Ultraviolet, as it sees the boys performing on stage with tour footage from their recent tour, "Up Close and Personal". The video was filmed during their "Up Close And Personal" tour 2007 at the Wolverhampton tour date.

=== "Transylvania" ===
McFly's official site reported in January that the video "will see all the boys dressed up as girls in a gothic castle, with nasty villains, damsels in distress, and over the top shenanigans". The silent-movie-style black-and-white video, shot in late January 2007 and viewable on YouTube from 3 February 2007, features the boys dressed up in costumes from a variety of mismatched time periods. Anne Boleyn is portrayed by Dougie Poynter.

== Track listings ==
UK CD single

1. "Baby's Coming Back"
2. "Transylvania"
3. "Fight for Your Right" (live)

UK DVD single

1. "Baby's Coming Back" (audio)
2. "Transylvania" (audio)
3. "Transylvania" (video)
4. "Opening Night of 'Up Close & Personal Tour'" (video)
5. "Studio Tour" (video)

== Charts ==
=== Weekly charts ===
Chart (2007)	Peak position
Europe (Eurochart Hot 100)	8
Ireland (IRMA)	16
Scottish Singles Sales (Official Charts)	1
UK Singles (Official Charts)	1
UK Airplay (Music Week)	50

=== Year-end charts ===
Chart (2007)	Position
UK Singles (OCC)	168
