= Prang (album) =

2026 album by alternative rock group A

Studio album by A
- Released: 22 May 2026
- Length: 36:48
- Label: Cooking Vinyl
- Producer: Jason Perry

A chronology
Teen Dance Ordinance (2005)	Prang (2026)

Prang is the fifth studio album by the British alternative rock band A. It was released on 22 May 2026, by Cooking Vinyl. The nearly 21 years since Teen Dance Ordinance makes it the longest gap between studio albums in the band's career. It is their first studio album to feature bassist Richard Trigg.

Upon its release, Prang reached forty-two on the UK Albums Chart, number six on the Scottish Albums Chart, number one on the UK Rock & Metal Albums Chart, number three on the Independent Albums Chart and number five on the Physical Albums Chart.

== Background ==
In 2023, there were rumours of new A material, and during July 2023 social media posts from the individual members began to appear showing the band working on new material in the studio.

On 14 April 2025, Jason Perry confirmed that the album would be finished by the end of the month, though "it won't be mixed and it'll probably be shit." In November 2025, A signed a new record deal with Cooking Vinyl. On 20 December 2025, the band would shoot four music videos in one day with help from venue Sitcom Soldiers. They recorded videos for "Techno Viking" and "Bring On the Likes" with 100 volunteer extras, along with videos for "Shit Summer" and "Walkover" by themselves.

In January 2026, the band changed their profile picture on all social media to promote the upcoming album, posting the image with the caption "2026." to their Instagram, later announcing the album's title Prang on 27 February on X alongside the accompanying single "Hello Sunshine" via Cooking Vinyl.

== Track listing ==
All lyrics are written by Jason Perry; all music is composed by Jason Perry, Adam Perry, Mark Chapman, and Richard Trigg, except "Bring on the Likes" (composed with Jordan Cardy).

Prang track listing
No.	Title	Length
1.	"Hello Sunshine"	3:25
2.	"Walkover"	2:53
3.	"Bring On the Likes"	4:29
4.	"Shit Summer"	5:04
5.	"All In"	3:20
6.	"Techno Viking"	1:49
7.	"Kings of Lowestoft"	4:07
8.	"Comment Leaver"	4:33
9.	"Back to the Shop"	3:09
10.	"Lifeline"	3:59
Total length:		36:48

== Personnel ==
Credits adapted from Tidal.

=== A ===
- Mark Chapman – electric guitar
- Adam Perry – drums
- Giles Perry – keyboards, background vocals
- Jason Perry – lead vocals, production, engineering
- Richard Trigg – bass guitar

=== Additional contributors ===
- Darren Lawson – mixing
- Robin Schmidt – mastering

== Charts ==
Chart performance for Prang
Chart (2026)	Peak position
Scottish Albums (OCC)	6
UK Albums (OCC)	42
UK Independent Albums (OCC)	3
UK Rock & Metal Albums (OCC)	1
