= Starbucks (song) =

Single by A

from the album Hi-Fi Serious
- Released: 2002
- Genre: Pop punk
- Length: 3.20
- Label: London Records
- Songwriter(s): A
- Producer(s): Al Clay

A singles chronology
"Nothing" (2002)	"Starbucks" (2002)	"Something's Going On" (2002)

"Starbucks" is a song by British rock band A, released as the second single from their third album Hi-Fi Serious, and is loosely based on the coffee company. It reached number 20 on the UK Singles Chart for a week.

== Track listing ==
CD 1

1. "Starbucks"
2. "Some People"
3. "Champion of Endings"
4. "Starbucks" (Video)

CD 2

1. "Starbucks"
2. "Monterey"
3. "Coming Around"
4. "Coming Around" (Video)
