= Hi-Fi Serious =

Studio album by A
- Released: 4 March 2002
- Recorded: August–December 2001
- Genres: Alternative rock, post-grunge, hard rock, pop rock
- Length: 45:36
- Label: London
- Producers: Ken Andrews, Al Clay

A chronology
| Exit Stage Right (2000) | Hi-Fi Serious (2002) | Teen Dance Ordinance (2005) |

Professional ratings
Review scores
| Source | Rating |
|---|---|
| AllMusic | 4/5 stars |
| Alternative Press | 6/10 |
| Blender | 4/5 stars |
| Classic Rock | 5/5 stars |
| Drowned in Sound | 9/10 |
| laut.de | 4/5 stars |
| NME | 7/10 |
| Nude as the News | (Positive) |
| Ox-Fanzine | Favourable |
| Q | 4/5 stars |

Hi-Fi Serious is the third studio album by British alternative rock band A, released on 4 March 2002 in the United Kingdom and later that July in the United States.

The name "Hi-Fi Serious" was derived from that of a fictional electronics store, from which Alan Partridge purchased a Bang & Olufsen stereo system in the final episode of the first series of British sitcom, I'm Alan Partridge. The tour in support of the album's release was named the "Inner City Sumo Tour" – another nod to Partridge, this time referencing a line in the show's very first episode.

== Charts, sales and legacy ==
The album is certified Silver in the U.K., having sold over 60,000 copies.

The album's first single Nothing made it to No. 9 in the UK singles chart before the album's release, propelling the band higher up the ladder - the album peaked at No. 18 in the UK album charts - and although they were still not seen as a mainstream artist, the album still won them "Best British Band" at the Kerrang! Awards.

In 2005, readers of Kerrang! magazine voted Hi-Fi Serious the 57th best British rock album ever.

== Track listing ==
All tracks are written by Jason Perry.

| No. | Title | Length |
|---|---|---|
| 1. | "Nothing" | 3:43 |
| 2. | "Something's Going On" | 2:58 |
| 3. | "6 O'Clock on a Tube Stop" | 3:14 |
| 4. | "Going Down" | 4:09 |
| 5. | "Took It Away" | 3:29 |
| 6. | "Starbucks" | 3:18 |
| 7. | "The Springs" | 4:28 |
| 8. | "Shut Yer Face" | 3:43 |
| 9. | "Pacific Ocean Blue" | 3:27 |
| 10. | "The Distance" | 3:37 |
| 11. | "W.D.Y.C.A.I." (Why Don't You Cry About It) | 3:27 |
| 12. | "Hi-Fi Serious" | 5:57 |
| Total length: | | 45:36 |

US and streaming versions
| No. | Title | Length |
|---|---|---|
| 13. | "Champions of Endings" | 4:47 |
| Total length: | | 50:23 |

Japanese version
| No. | Title | Length |
|---|---|---|
| 13. | "Asshole" | 4:28 |
| Total length: | | 50:04 |

== DVD features ==
Hi-Fi Serious was later re-released with an additional DVD of live footage and other video clips of the band. This included music videos for "Nothing", "The Distance", and the song "Old Folks" from their previous album 'A' vs. Monkey Kong, a 12-minute documentary, UK TV commercials for Hi-Fi Serious, and 20 minutes of "Live at Reading 2002" footage.

== 2018 Re-Release ==
Hi-Fi Serious was re-released in 2018, including a reissue on CD and the album's debut on vinyl. The reissue included a bonus CD entitled "The B Sides", which contained a collection of many hard-to-find songs from their back catalogue.

=== Bonus disc tracklist ===
All tracks are written by Jason Perry.

| No. | Title | Writer(s) | Length |
|---|---|---|---|
| 1. | "Good Idea" | | 2:18 |
| 2. | "Radio Lebanon" | | 3:19 |
| 3. | "Over It" | | 1:47 |
| 4. | "Owner of a Lonely Heart" | Jon Anderson / Chris Squire / Trevor Horn / Trevor Rabin | 4:37 |
| 5. | "Champions of Endings" | | 4:47 |
| 6. | "Alright" | | 2:41 |
| 7. | "I Can't Wait Until Morning" | | 3:23 |
| 8. | "Last Girl" | | 4:25 |
| 9. | "French Kiss" | | 3:14 |
| 10. | "Look What You Made Me Do" | | 3:14 |
| 11. | "Sorry But..." | | 4:04 |
| 12. | "Have the Night" | | 3:41 |
| 13. | "Coming Around" | | 3:30 |
| Total length: | | | 44:54 |

== Charts ==
Chart performance for Hi-Fi Serious
| Chart (2002) | Peak position |
|---|---|
| Austrian Albums (Ö3 Austria) | 39 |
| German Albums (Offizielle Top 100) | 29 |
| Scottish Albums (Official Charts) | 20 |
| Swiss Albums (Schweizer Hitparade) | 42 |
| UK Albums (Official Charts) | 18 |
