= Just Like Paradise =

1987 single by David Lee Roth

Single by David Lee Roth

from the album Skyscraper
- B-side: "The Bottom Line"
- Released: December 30, 1987
- Genre: Pop rock; glam metal
- Length: 4:03
- Label: Warner Bros.
- Songwriters: David Lee Roth; Brett Tuggle
- Producers: David Lee Roth; Steve Vai

David Lee Roth singles chronology
| "Tobacco Road" (1986) | "Just Like Paradise" (1987) | "Stand Up" (1988) |

Music video
- "Just Like Paradise" on YouTube

"Just Like Paradise" is a song by American rock singer David Lee Roth. Released after he left Van Halen, it was produced by Roth and guitarist Steve Vai. Serving as the lead single from Roth's second solo album, Skyscraper (1988), it reached the top 10 in the United States and Canada, topping the US Billboard Album Rock Tracks chart for four weeks.

== Release and reception ==
Released in 1987, "Just Like Paradise" entered the US Billboard Hot 100 chart in January 1988 and peaked at number six that March. It also spent four weeks atop the Billboard Album Rock Tracks chart. The song peaked at eight in Canada, number 27 in the United Kingdom, number 13 in New Zealand, and number 77 in the Netherlands.

Music critic Charles Bottomley called the song "a polished ode to decadence, with a chorus you would be unashamed to punch the air to". AllMusic's Eduardo Rivadavia described it as an "ultra-saccharine" single that tries "too hard to achieve an exaggerated pop sheen".

== Music video ==
The video for the single was released in January 1988. Like other Roth videos, it heavily featured live stage performance. Between are clips of Roth rock climbing at Half Dome shot by Emmy Award-winning mountain climbing photographer David Breashears. "I started climbing when I was 11, in the Boy Scouts," he recalled. "It was a natural thing, plus you add in the books and comics and the movies. I'd say, 'Aw, I don't want to be the actor, I want to go to Arabia!" The video concludes with Roth on a 28-foot surfboard gliding across a concert venue. "You ask four different people their impression of [the surfboard], you get six different responses," he observed. "I had a driver called Cowboy, a chopper pilot during the Tet Offensive. He said to me one day at rehearsal, 'Goddamn Dave: that reminds me of 'Nam… contour-flying over a hostile landing zone!' Then again, everything reminded Cowboy of 'Nam!" Noisecreep ranked the video 10th on their list of the best David Lee Roth videos.

== Track listings ==
7-inch single

1. "Just Like Paradise" (Roth, Tuggle) – 4:03
2. "The Bottom Line" (Roth, Vai) – 3:37

UK 12-inch single

1. "Just Like Paradise" (Roth, Tuggle) – 4:03
2. "The Bottom Line" (Roth, Vai) – 3:37
3. "Yankee Rose" (Roth, Vai) – 3:47

== Charts ==
=== Weekly charts ===
| Chart (1988) | Peak position |
|---|---|
| Canada Top Singles (RPM) | 8 |
| Italy Airplay (Music & Media) | 1 |
| Netherlands (Single Top 100) | 77 |
| New Zealand (Recorded Music NZ) | 13 |
| UK Singles (Official Charts) | 27 |
| US Billboard Hot 100 | 6 |
| US Mainstream Rock Airplay (Billboard) | 1 |

=== Year-end charts ===
| Chart (1988) | Position |
|---|---|
| Canada Top Singles (RPM) | 80 |
| US Billboard Hot 100 | 97 |
| US Album Rock Tracks (Billboard) | 38 |
