= How Ace Are Buildings =

Studio album by A
- Released: 29 July 1997
- Recorded: June–December 1996
- Genre: Alternative rock
- Length: 57:52
- Label: Tycoon/London (UK); Immortal/Epic (planned US release)
- Producer: Thom Wilson

A chronology
How Ace Are Buildings (1997)	A vs. Monkey Kong (1999)

Professional ratings
Review scores
Source	Rating
Allmusic	3.5/5 stars
NME	7/10
Select	2/5

How Ace Are Buildings is the debut album by British alternative rock band A, released in 1997.

The album was re-released in 1998, in cassette and Limited Edition 12" formats. Whereas the cassette featured the same tracks, the 12" album also included a bonus disc, featuring A remixes and live tracks.

The vinyl edition was limited to 500 copies.

== Track listing ==
1. "Turn It Up" – 1:33
2. "Foghorn" – 3:04
3. "Cheeky Monkey" – 3:36
4. "Number One" – 3:50
5. "Bad Idea" – 2:21
6. "Sing-A-Long" – 4:20
7. "Winter of '96" – 5:28
8. "Out of Tune" – 4:19
9. "Fistral" – 3:59
10. "House Under the Ground" – 4:01
11. "Five in the Morning" – 3:14
12. "Ender" – 18:07
- Contains a hidden track at 14:49

"Number One" features a portion of lyrics taken from Billy Joel's 1978 track "My Life". Joel was name-checked in the credits as a result. The "borrowed" lyrics are:

"Got a call from an old friend, used to be real close
Said he couldn't go on the American way
Sold his house, sold his car
Bought a ticket to the West Coast
Now he gives 'em a stand-up routine in L.A."

"Cheeky Monkey" features a sample of the actor/comedian John Thomson using the phrase "oh, you cheeky monkey" - this is taken from Thomson's appearance on Knowing Me, Knowing You... with Alan Partridge in character as Joe Beesley, an inept ventriloquist with a puppet monkey.

== Bonus vinyl Track listing ==
1. "Turn It Down"
2. "Number One (Happy Valley Ranch Mix)"
3. "Alright (Live)"
4. "Bad Idea (Live)"
5. "Sing-A-Long (Post Term Audit Mix)"
6. "Five in the Morning (DJ Mental Visuals Mix)"
7. "Foghorn (Live)"
8. "Barnyard"
9. "Demolished House" (b-side to foghorn, also remix of House Under The Ground)
10. "Callhimin"
11. "Cheeky Monkey (Live)"
12. "Fistral (Major Threat Mix)"
13. "Out of Tune" (Live)

== Singles ==
Five in the Morning (TYCD 1)

1. "Five in the Morning" - 3:13
2. "8 Fingers" - 2:26
3. "Almost Everything Is Great" - 5:29

House Under The Ground (TYCD 2)

1. "House Under The Ground" - 4:01
2. "40" - 2:30
3. "Demolished House" - 5:22

Bad Idea (TYCD 3)

1. "Bad Idea" – 2:16
2. "Look What You Made Me Do" – 3:12
3. "40" – 2:30

Number One (TYCD 4)

1. "Number One (Radio Edit)" - 3:22
2. "Alright" - 2:41
3. "Ouch!" - 4:00
4. "Number One" - 3:50

Foghorn (TYCD 5)

1. "Foghorn" – 3:07
2. "Last Girl" – 4:24
3. "A Demolished House" – 5:22

Number One

- CD1 (TYCD 6):
1. "Number One" – 3:21
2. "Good Idea" – 2:18
3. "Alright" – 2:41
4. "Sasquatch" – 2:52
- CD2 (TYCDP 6):
1. "Number One" – 3:51 (+30)
2. "Ouch" – 4:02
3. "Number One" – 6:15 (Happy Valley Ranch Mix)
4. "Foghorn" – 3:06
5. "Foghorn" (Video)

Sing-A-Long

- CD1 (TYCD 7):
1. "Sing-A-Long (Radio Edit)" - 3:41
2. "I'm Over It" - 1:47
3. "Callhimin" - 5:02
4. "Photo Finger" - 3:58
- CD2 (TYCDP 7):
1. "Sing-A-Long" – 4:19
2. "Sing-A-Long" – 4:22 (Post Team Audit Mix)
3. "Singing Out of Tune" – 3:49 (In A Castle)
4. "Number One" – 3:22 (Radio Edit)
5. "Number One" (Video)
