= Teen Dance Ordinance (album) =

Studio album by A
- Released: 25 June 2005
- Recorded: January 2003–March 2005
- Genres: Alternative rock, pop punk, hard rock
- Length: 47:30
- Label: London (UK)
- Producer: Terry Date

A chronology
Hi-Fi Serious (2002)	Teen Dance Ordinance (2005)	Prang (2026)

Professional ratings
Review scores
Source	Rating
Drowned in Sound	4/10 stars
laut.de	3/5 stars
Planet Sound	8/10 stars

Teen Dance Ordinance is the fourth album by the alternative rock group A. It was released on 25 June 2005 in the United Kingdom and later in the United States. The title refers to a law passed in 1985 by Seattle City Council and repealed in 2002 that prohibited minors and adults from attending the same dance clubs. It featured a more straight-rock sound and displayed an almost complete absence of the keyboards and sampling that marked the early sound of the band.

Due to many delays in the release of the album, which consisted of the label shelving the album for two years after recording was already completed in 2003 and Jason Perry experiencing illness, the band were already out of general public interest due to the long time they were away from releasing material. This meant the album was given very little promotional attention by the label and media, meaning it only charted at number 95 on the UK Albums Chart and the band was dropped by Warner in October as a result. After the failure of the album, the band went on hiatus until reforming in 2008. For almost 21 years, it remained the band's most recent album until the 2026 release of Prang.

"Rush Song" was played as background music in the UK version of the television show Pimp My Ride.

== Track listing ==
1. "Rush Song" – 4:09
2. "Better Off with Him" – 3:30
3. "The Art of Making Sense" – 4:13
4. "Someone Else" – 3:55
5. "Die Tonight" – 4:02
6. "2nd Coming" – 4:13
7. "Wake Up" – 2:43
8. "Black Hole" – 4:15
9. "Hey" – 4:06
10. "Worst Thing That Can Happen" – 3:36
11. "Afterburner" – 4:19
12. "Wisdom" – 4:24

== B Sides ==
The album featured many B Sides across the singles that were released as part of the "Teen Dance Ordinance" album cycle.

- "French Kiss" (B Side to "Rush Song" / Japanese album bonus track) – 3:14
- "Get Out More" (B Side to "Rush Song" / Japanese album bonus track) – 4:17
- "Have the Night" (B Side to "Rush Song") – 3:43
- "The One" (B Side to "Rush Song" 7" vinyl release) – 3:45
- "Descender" (B Side to "Better Off With Him") – 3:10
- "Broken Island" (B Side to "Better Off With Him" DVD single release) – 3:17
- "I Wonder" (B Side to "Better Off With Him" 7" vinyl release) – 4:05
- "Radio Lebanon" (Previously Unreleased B Side, released as part of the 2018 re-release of "Hi-Fi Serious" bonus CD "The B Sides") – 3:20

== Charts ==
Chart performance for Teen Dance Ordinance
Chart (2005)	Peak position
UK Albums (Official Charts)	95
