= 'A' vs. Monkey Kong =

Studio album by A
- Released: 16 August 1999 (UK) 26 September 2000 (US)
- Recorded: October 1998–February 1999
- Studio: ICP Recording Studios (Brussels); Eden Studios (London); #5; Martello Tower (Suffolk)
- Genre: Alternative rock
- Length: 50:29
- Label: Tycoon Recordings
- Producer: Al Clay

A chronology
How Ace Are Buildings (1997)	'A' vs. Monkey Kong (1999)	Exit Stage Right (2000)

Singles from 'A' vs. Monkey Kong
- 1. "Summer on the Underground" Released: 12 October 1998; 2. "Old Folks" Released: 24 May 1999; 3. "I ❤ Lake Tahoe" Released: 9 August 1999

Professional ratings
Review scores
Source	Rating
AllMusic	3.5/5 stars
NME	4/10
Q	3/5 stars

'A' vs. Monkey Kong (titled Monkey Kong in the United States) is the second studio album by the British alternative rock band A. It was released on 16 August 1999 via Tycoon Recordings. Recording sessions took place at ICP Recording Studios in Brussels, Eden Studios in London, at #5, and at Martello Tower in Suffolk from October 1998 to February 1999. Production was handled by Al Clay. The album reached number 62 on the UK Albums Chart and number 81 on the Offizielle Deutsche Charts. It was promoted with three charted singles, "Summer on the Underground", "Old Folks" and "I Love Lake Tahoe", which peaked at No. 72, 54 and 59, respectively, on the UK Singles Chart.

In May and June 2001, the band toured Europe as part of the Deconstruction Tour. In 2020, the album was ranked No. 43 by Kerrang! magazine 'The 50 best albums from 1999' list.

== Track listing ==
All lyrics are written by Jason Perry, except track 10 written by Daniel P. Carter; all music is composed by A.

No.	Title	Length
1.	"For Starters"	2:33
2.	"Monkey Kong"	3:45
3.	"A"	3:31
4.	"Old Folks"	3:55
5.	"Hopper Jonnus Fang"	4:32
6.	"Summer on the Underground"	4:52
7.	"Warning"	1:41
8.	"If It Ain't Broke, Fix It Anyway"	2:23
9.	"I Love Lake Tahoe"	3:56
10.	"Don't Be Punks"	0:52
11.	"Down on the Floor"	3:46
12.	"Jason's Addiction"	5:36
13.	"Miles Away"	3:24
14.	"Getting Around"	5:37
Total length:		50:29

US bonus tracks
No.	Title	Length
15.	"She Said"	3:41
16.	"One Day"	3:36
17.	"If It Ain't Broke" (Live)	2:31
Total length:		1:00:15

== Personnel ==
- Jason Perry – vocals, lyrics, recording, mixing, photography
- Mark Chapman – guitar
- Giles Perry – keyboards, backing vocals
- Daniel P. Carter – bass, lyrics, backing vocals, recording
- Adam Perry – drums
- Alistair Clay – producer, recording, mixing
- Jean-Pierre Chalbos – mastering
- Howie Weinberg – mastering
- Michael Gillette – illustration
- Yacht Associates – art direction, design, photography

== Charts ==
Chart (1999)	Peak position
UK Albums (OCC)	62

Chart (2000)	Peak position
German Albums (Offizielle Top 100)	81
