= A (band) =

British alternative rock band

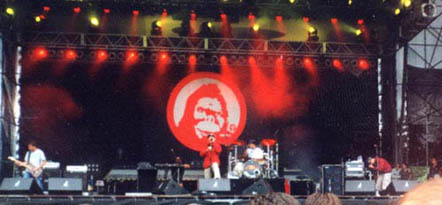
- A in 2000

Background information
- Origin: Suffolk, England
- Genres: Alternative rock; pop punk; hard rock; post-grunge
- Years active: 1993–2005; 2008–present
- Labels: London; Mammoth; Cooking Vinyl
- Members: Jason Perry; Adam Perry; Giles Perry; Mark Chapman; Richard Trigg
- Past members: Steve Swindon; Daniel P. Carter
- Website: therockbandcalleda.com

A are a British alternative rock band from Lowestoft formed in 1993. The band consists of brothers Jason Perry (vocals), Giles Perry (keyboards, backing vocals) and Adam Perry (drums), as well as Mark Chapman (guitar) and Richard Trigg (bass). Bass guitarist Daniel P. Carter was a longtime member of the band during its initial run.

The band have released five studio and two live albums, including their debut How Ace Are Buildings (1997) and the UK top 20 album, Hi-Fi Serious (2002). The band's singles often achieved chart success, with one UK top 10, four UK top 40, and seven UK top 100 singles.

Shortly after releasing their fourth album, Teen Dance Ordinance (2005), the band entered an indefinite hiatus. The band reunited for a one-off gig in 2007 and toured intermittently over the next nineteen years. After a twenty-one year break from recording, the band released its fifth album, Prang, in 2026, which entered the UK Rock & Metal Albums Chart at number one and the UK Albums Chart at forty-two.

== History ==
=== 1993–2001: Formation, How Ace Are Buildings and A vs. Monkey Kong ===
The band began in Suffolk in 1988 as Grand Designs, named after the song by Rush. The founding members were twins Jason and Adam Perry and their friend Mark Chapman, alongside bassist Stevie Swindon and the twins' younger brother Giles. They cited Rush, the Beach Boys, Van Halen, and the Beastie Boys among their early influences.

After changing their name to A in 1993, and abandoning their early progressive rock-inspired sound for a more punk rock style, they signed a European recording contract with Warner Bros. Records UK in 1996 and released their debut LP How Ace Are Buildings in 1997. Also in 1997, the band briefly appeared in the music video for "Anthem" by the Wildhearts. A found a healthy underground reception and even had a couple of low-charting singles in the UK.

Although A achieved some recognition with How Ace Are Buildings, bassist Stevie Swindon left the band. He was replaced in 1997 by bassist and future BBC Radio 1 Rock Show DJ Daniel P Carter. Swindon went on to establish the award-winning community arts charity TAPE Community Music and Film in 2008.

A licensing agreement for the American music market was reached with the North Carolina–based Mammoth Records. Future releases would be distributed in the U.S. and Canada by Mammoth.

A's second album A vs. Monkey Kong followed in 1999. The band then toured the world and enjoyed a small degree of success worldwide, especially in Germany. They released a live album, Exit Stage Right in 2000.

=== 2002–2004: Hi-Fi Serious and commercial success ===
Hi-Fi Serious was their third album, released in 2002 and is certified Silver in the UK having sold over 60,000 copies. It was preceded by their biggest single "Nothing", which became the band's first and only top ten hit when it reached number 9 in the UK singles chart. "Nothing" was followed by top 20 hit "Starbucks", named after the coffee chain.

The tour following Hi-Fi Serious saw the band playing their largest venues to date, headlining the 5,000 capacity Brixton Academy as part of their Inner-City Sumo Tour. At the end of the year, they won the Kerrang! award for Best British Band.

In 2004, their single "Nothing" appeared on Beyblade's Let It Rip! official soundtrack. In 2007, "Something's Going On" and "The Distance" appeared on the Surf's Up video game soundtrack.

=== 2005–2007: Teen Dance Ordinance and hiatus ===
A released their fourth album, Teen Dance Ordinance (TDO), on 27 June 2005. The album had been recorded a year earlier, but was heavily delayed due disputes with the record company. It featured a more straight rock sound and displayed an almost complete absence of the keyboards and sampling that marked the early sound of the band. Unlike their last two albums, Teen Dance Ordinance was not released in the US. Hollywood Records agreed early on to release it in the US, but ultimately did not.

Following the release of Teen Dance Ordinance in 2005, the band worked on other projects. Jason Perry spent time writing, recording, and touring with Matt Willis, formerly of Busted, and has now become a Grammy award-winning producer, working with the likes of the Blackout, Kids in Glass Houses, and McFly. Adam Perry and Daniel P Carter briefly became full-time members of the Bloodhound Gang: Perry replaced drummer Willie the New Guy in 2005, and Carter replaced guitarist Lupus Thunder in 2009.

Carter continued writing material with Jason Perry and artists such as McFly, and has hosted BBC Radio 1's Rock Show since 25 September 2006.

Mark Chapman went into teaching and has played in the bands Malpractice, alongside drum'n'bass producer Adam F, and 'MiLLS,' fronted by former Cable drummer Richie Mills. Giles Perry went on to work for the BBC, and has also produced videos for Hundred Reasons and Biffy Clyro.

=== 2008–2024: Reunion and intermittent touring ===
In August 2008, Adam Perry revealed six tour dates supporting the Wildhearts on the band's forum, noting that: "This is going to be wicked and we are grateful to the Wildhearts for dragging us from our retirement! Plus there are now big plans afoot to start the new record for next year."

Bassist Daniel P Carter did not return to the band, however, and John Mitchell, frontman of It Bites and producer of bands including Enter Shikari and Funeral for a Friend, filled in for the tour.

A played a 10-date UK tour in December 2009, supported by This City. On 13 May 2010, Bowling For Soup singer Jaret Reddick announced A as support band for their Autumn tour. A then announced on their own Twitter on 26 May 2010 that Daniel P. Carter would be returning to the band for this tour. Later that year, Perry and Carter were credited as co-writers of the Subways song "I Wanna Dance With You" from the album Money & Celebrity.

A played a one-off show at the Kasbah nightclub in Coventry on 1 December 2012. In June 2015, they played warm-up concerts in St Albans and Royal Tunbridge Wells before headlining the 4th stage at that year's Download Festival. Andrew "Shay" Sheehy, formerly of Kids in Glass Houses, filled in on bass guitar for these shows.

In February 2018, A embarked on an 8-date UK tour in support of Hell Is for Heroes, joined briefly by McFly bassist Dougie Poynter. and an appearance at Download Festival. In November 2018, the band went on a 9-date tour playing the album Hi-Fi Serious in full, with support from Wheatus and InMe followed by another UK headline tour and appearances at 2000trees and Camden Rocks in summer 2019.

In November 2019, A played eight dates in the UK to celebrate the 20th anniversary of the album A vs. Monkey Kong. The band were joined by Tim Hillier-Brook of Architects who stepped in on bass guitar for the tour. Support was provided by '68.

During 2021, A performed on the main stage at the Download Festival Pilot event and the rescheduled Slam Dunk Festival.

In April 2022, the band played a warm-up show in Dover before heading out around the UK on 11 dates as main support for Reef.

=== 2025–present Prang ===
On 14 April 2025, Jason Perry confirmed that the band would finish their new album by the end of the month, though "it won't be mixed and it'll probably be shit." In November 2025, the band signed a new record deal with Cooking Vinyl.

On 20 December 2025, the band would shoot 4 music videos in one day. They recorded videos for "Techno Viking" and "Bring On The Likes" with 100 volunteered extras, along with 2 unconfirmed videos.

In January 2026, the band changed their profile picture on all social media to promote the upcoming album, posting the image with the caption "2026." to their Instagram, later announcing the album's title, Prang, on 27 February, alongside the accompanying single "Hello Sunshine" via Cooking Vinyl.

Upon its release, Prang reached forty-two on the UK Albums Chart, number six on the Scottish Albums Chart, number one on the UK Rock & Metal Albums Chart, number three on the Independent Albums Chart and number five on the Physical Albums Chart.

== Members ==
Current members

- Jason Perry – lead vocals (1993–2005, 2008–present)
- Adam Perry – drums (1993–2005, 2008–present)
- Giles Perry – keyboards, backing vocals (1993–2005, 2008–present)
- Mark Chapman – guitar (1993–2005, 2008–present)
- Richard Trigg – bass guitar (2022–present)

Former members

- Steve Swindon – bass guitar (1993–1997)
- Daniel P. Carter – bass guitar, backing vocals (1997–2005, 2010–2012)

Former touring members

- John Mitchell – bass guitar (2008)
- Andrew Sheehy – bass guitar (2015)
- Dougie Poynter – bass guitar (2018–2019)
- Tim Hillier-Brook – bass guitar (2019–2022)

== Discography ==
- How Ace Are Buildings (1997)
- A vs. Monkey Kong (1999)
- Hi-Fi Serious (2002)
- Teen Dance Ordinance (2005)
- Prang (2026)
