= List of UK Independent Albums Chart number ones of 2022 =

These are the Official Charts Company's UK Independent Albums Chart number ones of 2022.

== Chart history ==
Issue date	Album	Artist(s)	Record label	Ref.
7 January	Disco	Kylie Minogue	BMG	
14 January	Transparency	Twin Atlantic	Staple Diet	
21 January	Fix Yourself, Not the World	The Wombats	The Wombats	
28 January	World I Understand	The Sherlocks	Teddy Boy	
4 February	Amazing Things	Don Broco	Sharptone	
11 February	Charmed Life – The Best of the Divine Comedy	The Divine Comedy	The Divine Comedy	
18 February	The Dream	Alt-J	Infectious	
25 February	Everything Was Forever	Sea Power	Golden Chariot	
4 March	23	Central Cee	Central Cee	
11 March	Oochya!	Stereophonics	Stylus	
18 March	So Happy It Hurts	Bryan Adams	BMG	
25 March	Torpedo	Feeder	Big Teeth	
1 April	Never Let Me Go	Placebo	So Recordings	
8 April	Normal Fears	Fatherson	Easy Life	
15 April	Wet Leg	Wet Leg	Domino	
22 April	Wet Leg	Wet Leg	Domino	
29 April	Skinty Fia	Fontaines D.C.	Partisan	
6 May	Dopamine	Thunder	BMG	
13 May	Alpha Place	Knucks	No Days Off	
20 May	Blue Hours	Bear's Den	Communion Music	
27 May	Raw Data Feel	Everything Everything	Everything Everything	
3 June	Mellow Moon	Alfie Templeman	Chess Club	
10 June	Dear Scott	Michael Head/Red Elastic Band	Modern Sky	
17 June	Hate Über Alles	Kreator	Nuclear Blast	
24 June	A Light for Attracting Attention	The Smile	XL	
1 July	Wet Leg	Wet Leg	Domino	
8 July	Seven Psalms	Nick Cave	Cave Things	
15 July	Sound of the Morning	Katy J Pearson	Heavenly	
22 July	Beatopia	Beabadoobee	Dirty Hit	
29 July	Entering Heaven Alive	Jack White	Third Man	
5 August	Men's Needs, Women's Needs, Whatever	The Cribs	Sonic Blew	
12 August	Could We Be More	Kokoroko	Brownswood Recordings	
19 August	Unwanted	Pale Waves	Dirty Hit	
26 August	Freakout/Release	Hot Chip	Domino	
2 September	How to Be a Person Like Other People	Embrace	Mobetta	
9 September	Midpoint	Tom Chaplin	BMG	
16 September	Anthem	Toyah	Cherry Red	
23 September	Autofiction	Suede	BMG	
30 September	5SOS5	5 Seconds of Summer	BMG	
7 October	22	Craig David	BMG	
14 October	Under the Midnight Sun	The Cult	Black Hill	
21 October	Being Funny in a Foreign Language	The 1975	Dirty Hit	
28 October	The Car	Arctic Monkeys	Domino	
4 November	Trigged!	Massive Wagons	Earache	
11 November	A Song For You	Luke Evans	BMG	
18 November	Faith in the Future	Louis Tomlinson	BMG	
25 November	Get Rollin'	Nickelback	BMG	
2 December	Christmas with Aled and Russell	Aled Jones and Russell Watson	BMG	
9 December	Christmas with Aled and Russell	Aled Jones and Russell Watson	BMG	
16 December	The Car	Arctic Monkeys	Domino	
23 December	The Car	Arctic Monkeys	Domino	
30 December	A Song For You	Luke Evans	BMG	

== See also ==
- List of UK Rock & Metal Albums Chart number ones of 2022
- List of UK Album Downloads Chart number ones of 2022
- List of UK Dance Albums Chart number ones of 2022
- List of UK R&B Albums Chart number ones of 2022
- List of UK Independent Singles Chart number ones of 2022
