= List of UK Independent Singles Chart number ones of 2022 =

These are the Official Charts Company's UK Independent Singles Chart number-one singles of 2022.

== Chart history ==
Chart date (week ending)	Song	Artist(s)	Record label	References
6 January	"Merry Xmas Everybody"	Slade	BMG	
13 January	"Down Under"	Luude featuring Colin Hay	Sweat It Out	
20 January	"Fingers Crossed"	Lauren Spencer-Smith	Lauren Spencer-Smith	
27 January	"Fingers Crossed"	Lauren Spencer-Smith	Lauren Spencer-Smith	
3 February	"Fingers Crossed"	Lauren Spencer-Smith	Lauren Spencer-Smith	
10 February	"Down Under"	Luude featuring Colin Hay	Sweat It Out	
17 February	"Fingers Crossed"	Lauren Spencer-Smith	Lauren Spencer-Smith	
24 February	"Khabib"	Central Cee	Central Cee	
3 March	"Used to This"	Wilkinson and Issey Cross	BMG/Sleepless Music	
10 March ^{[b]}	"Straight Back to It"	Central Cee	Central Cee	
17 March	"Reggae & Calypso"	Russ Millions with Buni and YV	One Of A Kind Music	
24 March	"Reggae & Calypso"	Russ Millions with Buni and YV	One Of A Kind Music	
31 March	"Reggae & Calypso"	Russ Millions with Buni and YV	One Of A Kind Music	
7 April	"Reggae & Calypso"	Russ Millions with Buni and YV	One Of A Kind Music	
14 April	"Reggae & Calypso"	Russ Millions with Buni and YV	One Of A Kind Music	
21 April	"Reggae & Calypso"	Russ Millions with Buni and YV	One Of A Kind Music	
28 April	"Reggae & Calypso"	Russ Millions with Buni and YV	One Of A Kind Music	
5 May	"Reggae & Calypso"	Russ Millions with Buni and YV	One Of A Kind Music	
12 May	"Reggae & Calypso"	Russ Millions with Buni and YV	One Of A Kind Music	
19 May	"Reggae & Calypso"	Russ Millions with Buni and YV	One Of A Kind Music	
26 May	"Reggae & Calypso"	Russ Millions with Buni and YV	One Of A Kind Music	
2 June	"Charmer"	N-Dubz	Xploded Music	
9 June	"Prince Andrew Is a Sweaty Nonce"	The Kunts	Radical Rudeness	
16 June	"Balling"	Vibe Chemistry	D&B Allstars	
23 June	"Balling"	Vibe Chemistry	D&B Allstars	
30 June	"Balling"	Vibe Chemistry	D&B Allstars	
7 July	"Balling"	Vibe Chemistry	D&B Allstars	
14 July	"Someone Like You"	Adele	XL	
21 July	"Part of the Band"	The 1975	Dirty Hit	
28 July	"Snap"	Rosa Linn	Nvak Collective	
4 August	"Doja"	Central Cee	Central Cee	
11 August	"Doja"	Central Cee	Central Cee	
18 August	"Doja"	Central Cee	Central Cee	
25 August	"Doja"	Central Cee	Central Cee	
1 September	"Doja"	Central Cee	Central Cee	
8 September	"Doja"	Central Cee	Central Cee	
15 September	"Doja"	Central Cee	Central Cee	
22 September	"Doja"	Central Cee	Central Cee	
29 September	"Doja"	Central Cee	Central Cee	
6 October	"Doja"	Central Cee	Central Cee	
13 October	"Doja"	Central Cee	Central Cee	
20 October	"Doja"	Central Cee	Central Cee	
27 October	"One Up"	Central Cee	Central Cee	
3 November ^{[b]}	"Body Paint"	Arctic Monkeys	Domino	
10 November	"Doja"	Central Cee	Central Cee	
17 November	"Doja"	Central Cee	Central Cee	
24 November	"Out of Nowhere"	Bugzy Malone and TeeDee	BSomebody	
1 December	"Out of Nowhere"	Bugzy Malone and TeeDee	BSomebody	
8 December	"Escapism"	Raye featuring 070 Shake	Human Re Sources	
15 December	"Escapism"	Raye featuring 070 Shake	Human Re Sources	
22 December	"Escapism"	Raye featuring 070 Shake	Human Re Sources	
29 December ^{[a]}	"Food Aid"	LadBaby	BMG	

== Notes ==
- ^{a} – The single was simultaneously number-one on the singles chart.
- ^{b} - The artist was simultaneously number one on the Independent Albums Chart.

== Number-one Indie artists ==
Position	Artist	Weeks at number one
1	Central Cee	17
2	Russ Millions	11
2	Buni	11
2	YV	11
3	Lauren Spencer-Smith	4
3	Vibe Chemistry	4
3	Raye	3
3	070 Shake (as featuring)	3
4	Luude	2
4	Bugzy Malone	2
4	TeeDee	2
4	Colin Hay (as featuring)	2
5	Slade	1
5	Wilkinson	1
5	Issey Cross	1
5	N-Dubz	1
5	The Kunts	1
5	Adele	1
5	The 1975	1
5	Rosa Linn	1
5	Arctic Monkeys	1

== See also ==
- List of UK Dance Singles Chart number ones of 2022
- List of UK R&B Singles Chart number ones of 2022
- List of UK Rock & Metal Singles Chart number ones of 2022
- List of UK Independent Albums Chart number ones of 2022
