= List of UK Dance Albums Chart number ones of 2022 =

These are the Official Charts Company's UK Dance Albums Chart number ones of 2022. The chart week runs from Friday to Thursday with the chart-date given as the following Thursday.

== Chart history ==
Issue date	Album	Artist(s)	Record label	Ref.
6 January	The Annual 2022	Various artists	Ministry of Sound	
13 January	The Annual 2022	Various artists	Ministry of Sound	
20 January	Antidawn	Burial	Hyperdub	
27 January	Fragments	Bonobo	Ninja Tune	
3 February	Fragments	Bonobo	Ninja Tune	
10 February	Fragments	Bonobo	Ninja Tune	
17 February	Fragments	Bonobo	Ninja Tune	
24 February	Cognition	Wilkinson	BMG	
3 March	Disrespectful	Bad Boy Chiller Crew	Relentless	
10 March	Raum	Tangerine Dream	Kscope	
17 March	The Annual 2022	Various artists	Ministry of Sound	
24 March	The Annual 2022	Various artists	Ministry of Sound	
31 March	The Annual 2022	Various artists	Ministry of Sound	
7 April	Pattern Recognition	Glok	K7	
14 April	Tilt	Confidence Man	Heavenly	
21 April	The Annual 2022	Various artists	Ministry of Sound	
28 April	Paradise Again	Swedish House Mafia	Republic	
5 May	Paradise Again	Swedish House Mafia	Republic	
12 May	Profound Mysteries	Röyksopp	Dog Thiumph	
19 May	Happiness Not Included	Soft Cell	BMG	
26 May	More D4ta	Moderat	Monkeytown	
2 June	The Start of No Regret	Goldie/James Davidsen/Subjective	Sony Classical	
9 June	Ibiza 2022	Various Artists	Front of House	
16 June	The Annual 2022	Various Artists	Ministry of Sound	
23 June	What Came Before	Chase & Status	EMI	
30 June	Honestly, Nevermind	Drake	OVO/Republic	
7 July	Tilt	Confidence Man	Heavenly	
14 July	The Annual 2022	Various Artists	Ministry of Sound	
21 July	The Annual 2022	Various Artists	Ministry of Sound	
28 July	Let’s Emerge	Pye Corner Audio	Sonic Cathedral	
4 August	The Last Goodbye	Odesza	Foreign Family Collective	
11 August	Dig Your Own Hole	The Chemical Brothers	Virgin	
18 August	What I Breathe	Mall Grab	Looking for Trouble/LG105	
25 August	The Annual XXV	Various Artists	Ministry of Sound	
1 September	Freakout/Release	Hot Chip	Domino	
8 September	The Annual XXV	Various Artists	Ministry of Sound	
15 September	The Annual XXV	Various Artists	Ministry of Sound	
22 September	The Annual XXV	Various Artists	Ministry of Sound	
29 September	The Annual XXV	Various Artists	Ministry of Sound	
6 October	Paradise Again	Swedish House Mafia	Island	
13 October	Nymph	Shygirl	Because Music	
20 October	Capricorn Sun	Tsha	Ninja Tune	
27 October	Now Is	Rival Consoles	Erased Tapes	
3 November	Oxymore	Jean-Michel Jarre	RCA	
10 November	Actual Life 3 (January 1 – September 9, 2022)	Fred Again	Atlantic	
17 November	Ultra Truth	Daniel Avery	Phantasy Sound	
24 November	Feorm Falorx	Plaid	Warp	
1 December	No More Idols	Chase & Status	Mercury	
8 December	No More Idols	Chase & Status	Mercury	
15 December	This Is What We Do	Leftfield	Virgin	
22 December	U.F.Orb	The Orb	Island Masters	
29 December	This is What We Do	Leftfield	Virgin	

== See also ==
- List of UK Albums Chart number ones of 2022
- List of UK Dance Singles Chart number ones of 2022
- List of UK Album Downloads Chart number ones of 2022
- List of UK Independent Albums Chart number ones of 2022
- List of UK R&B Albums Chart number ones of 2022
- List of UK Rock & Metal Albums Chart number ones of 2022
- List of UK Compilation Chart number ones of the 2020s
