= Amazing Things =

Amazing Things may refer to:

- Amazing Things (Runrig album), released in 1993
- Amazing Things (Don Broco album), released in 2021
