= List of UK Dance Singles Chart number ones of 2022 =

The UK Dance Singles Chart is a weekly music chart compiled in the United Kingdom by the Official Charts Company (OCC) from sales of songs in the dance music genre (house, drum and bass, dubstep, etc.) in record stores and digital downloads. The chart week runs from Friday to Thursday with the chart-date given as the following Thursday.

This is a list of the songs which were number one on the UK Dance Singles Chart during 2022.

== Chart history ==
Chart date (week ending)	Song	Artist(s)	References
6 January	"Do It to It"	Acraze featuring Cherish	
13 January	"Do It to It"	Acraze featuring Cherish	
20 January	"Do It to It"	Acraze featuring Cherish	
27 January	"Where Are You Now"	Lost Frequencies and Calum Scott	
3 February	"Where Are You Now"	Lost Frequencies and Calum Scott	
10 February	"Where Are You Now"	Lost Frequencies and Calum Scott	
17 February	"Where Are You Now"	Lost Frequencies and Calum Scott	
24 February	"Where Are You Now"	Lost Frequencies and Calum Scott	
3 March	"Where Are You Now"	Lost Frequencies and Calum Scott	
10 March	"Where Are You Now"	Lost Frequencies and Calum Scott	
17 March	"Where Are You Now"	Lost Frequencies and Calum Scott	
24 March	"Where Are You Now"	Lost Frequencies and Calum Scott	
31 March	"Where Are You Now"	Lost Frequencies and Calum Scott	
7 April	"Where Are You Now"	Lost Frequencies and Calum Scott	
14 April	"Where Are You Now"	Lost Frequencies and Calum Scott	
21 April	"Where Are You Now"	Lost Frequencies and Calum Scott	
28 April	"Where Are You Now"	Lost Frequencies and Calum Scott	
5 May	"BMW"	Bad Boy Chiller Crew	
12 May	"Where Are You Now"	Lost Frequencies and Calum Scott	
19 May	"Where Are You Now"	Lost Frequencies and Calum Scott	
26 May	"Where Are You Now"	Lost Frequencies and Calum Scott	
2 June	"Where Are You Now"	Lost Frequencies and Calum Scott	
9 June	"Where Are You Now"	Lost Frequencies and Calum Scott	
16 June	"Afraid to Feel"	LF System	
23 June	"Afraid to Feel"	LF System	
30 June	"Afraid to Feel"	LF System	
7 July	"Afraid to Feel"	LF System	
14 July ^{[a]}	"Afraid to Feel"	LF System	
21 July ^{[a]}	"Afraid to Feel"	LF System	
28 July ^{[a]}	"Afraid to Feel"	LF System	
4 August ^{[a]}	"Afraid to Feel"	LF System	
11 August ^{[a]}	"Afraid to Feel"	LF System	
18 August ^{[a]}	"Afraid to Feel"	LF System	
25 August ^{[a]}	"Afraid to Feel"	LF System	
1 September ^{[a]}	"Afraid to Feel"	LF System	
8 September ^{[a]}	"B.O.T.A. (Baddest of Them All)"	Eliza Rose and Interplanetary Criminal	
15 September ^{[a]}	"B.O.T.A. (Baddest of Them All)"	Eliza Rose and Interplanetary Criminal	
22 September	"I'm Good (Blue)"	David Guetta and Bebe Rexha	
29 September^{[a]}	"I'm Good (Blue)"	David Guetta and Bebe Rexha	
6 October	"I'm Good (Blue)"	David Guetta and Bebe Rexha	
13 October	"I'm Good (Blue)"	David Guetta and Bebe Rexha	
20 October	"I'm Good (Blue)"	David Guetta and Bebe Rexha	
27 October	"I'm Good (Blue)"	David Guetta and Bebe Rexha	
3 November	"I'm Good (Blue)"	David Guetta and Bebe Rexha	
10 November	"I'm Good (Blue)"	David Guetta and Bebe Rexha	
17 November	"I'm Good (Blue)"	David Guetta and Bebe Rexha	
24 November	"Miss You"	Oliver Tree and Robin Schulz	
1 December	"Miss You"	Oliver Tree and Robin Schulz	
8 December	"Messy in Heaven"	Venbee and Goddard	
15 December	"Messy in Heaven"	Venbee and Goddard	
22 December	"Messy in Heaven"	Venbee and Goddard	
29 December	"Messy in Heaven"	Venbee and Goddard	

- ^{a} – the single was simultaneously number-one on the singles chart.

== Number-one artists ==
Position	Artist	Weeks at number one
1	Lost Frequencies	19
1	Calum Scott	19
2	LF System	12
3	David Guetta	9
3	Bebe Rexha	9
4	Venbee	4
4	Goddard	4
5	Acraze	3
6	Eliza Rose	2
6	Interplanetary Criminal	2
6	Oliver Tree	2
6	Robin Schulz	2
7	Bad Boy Chiller Crew	1

== See also ==
- List of number-one singles of 2022 (UK)
- List of UK Dance Albums Chart number ones of 2022
- List of UK R&B Singles Chart number ones of 2022
- List of UK Rock & Metal Singles Chart number ones of 2022
- List of UK Independent Singles Chart number ones of 2022
