= Nightmare Tripping =

Studio album by Don Broco
- Released: 27 March 2026
- Recorded: 2024–2026
- Studios: The Black Lodge (London); Vada Studios (Alcester, Warwickshire); The Pool, Miloco Studios (London); Decoy Studios (Woodbridge, Suffolk); MAK Studios (Bedford)
- Genres: Nu metal; metalcore; alternative rock
- Length: 42:26
- Label: Fearless
- Producer: Dan Lancaster

Don Broco chronology
Live from the Royal Albert Hall (2023)	Nightmare Tripping (2026)

Singles from Nightmare Tripping
- 1. "Cellophane" Released: 25 July 2025; 2. "Hype Man" Released: 29 August 2025; 3. "Disappear" Released: 15 September 2025; 4. "Euphoria" Released: 21 November 2025; 5. "Nightmare Tripping" Released: 12 February 2026; 6. "True Believers" Released: 27 March 2026

Nightmare Tripping is the fifth studio album by English four-piece rock band Don Broco. It was released on 27 March 2026 through Fearless Records, the band's first album released by the label since their signing in July 2025, and was produced by Dan Lancaster. It was the band's fifth consecutive album to top the UK Rock & Metal Albums Chart and reached number 7 on the UK Albums Chart.

== Background and release ==
Nightmare Tripping was recorded in Chris Wolstenholme of Muse's home studio, and in the Ibis Hotel in Adelaide, Australia.

The band released the first single, "Cellophane", alongside its music video on 25 July 2025. The next single, "Hype Man", was released on 29 August, ahead of touring dates in Australia in September. On 15 September, the band released "Disappear", the third single, ahead of touring dates in the US. The fourth single, titled "Euphoria", released on 21 November.

On 12 February 2026, the band announced the title, artwork, and release date of the album, and released the title track as a single featuring Nickelback, a collaboration which the band referred to as "a dream come true".

A week ahead of the album's release, Don Broco announced the Nightmare Tripping Europe/UK 2026 Tour on their official Instagram page. On 27 March, alongside the release of the album, the band released "True Believers" (featuring Sam Carter of Architects) as a single, originally written amidst the 2024 United Kingdom riots and 2024 Summer Olympics, which highlighted the "alarming contrast between celebratory British patriotism and violent English nationalism".

== Composition ==
Praised by critics for its blend of genres, Nightmare Tripping has been described as nu-metal, metalcore, alternative rock, with influences from pop, techno-pop, electronic, industrial, R&B, noisecore, and arena rock.

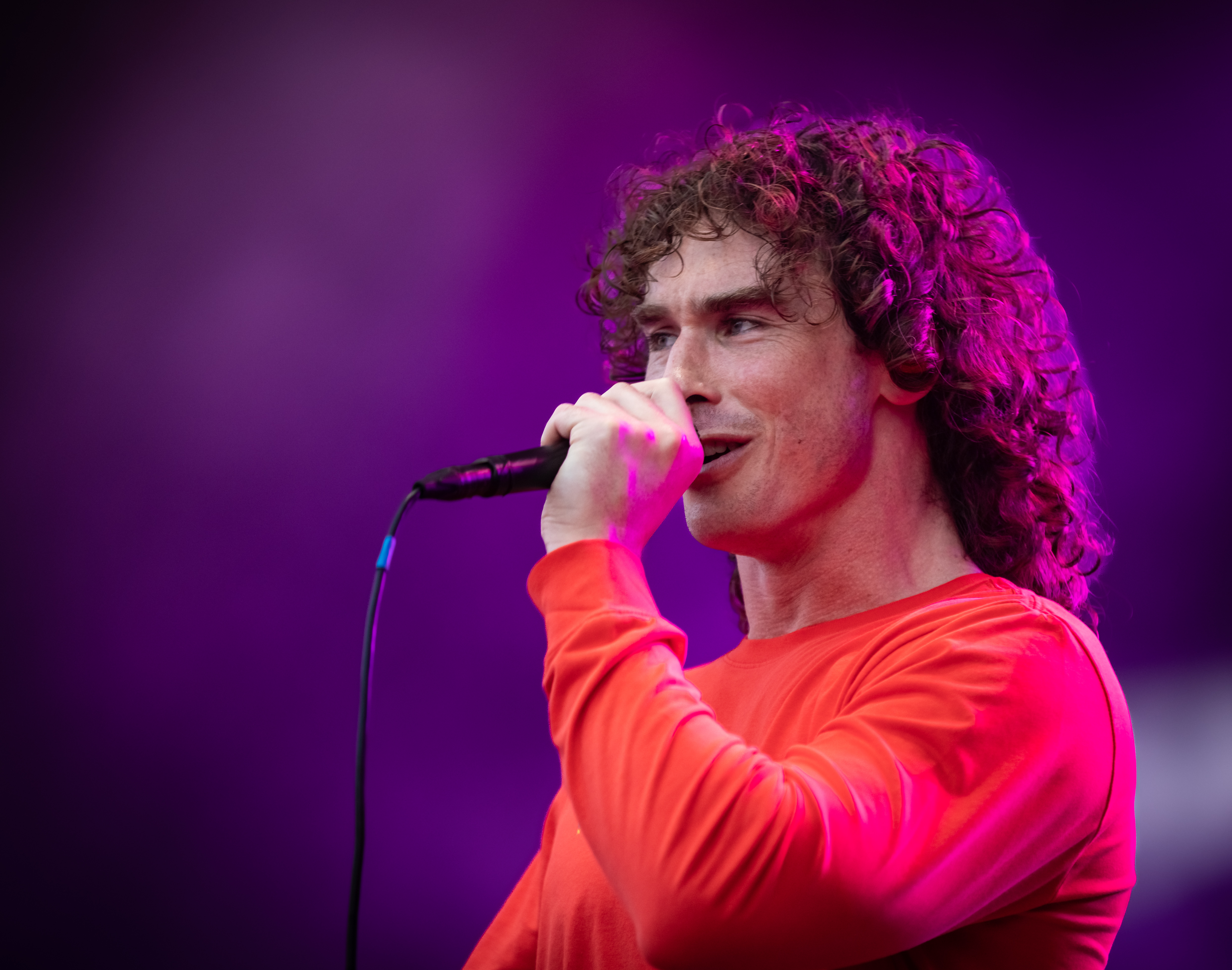
Frontman Rob Damiani based much of Nightmare Tripping on personal experiences and past emotions.

Many of the album's lyrics draw from personal experiences of the band members, with Damiani stating, "sometimes life is just ups and downs". Whilst appearing defeatist, Rock Sound's Maddy Howell notes that that statement also shows bravery in admitting to hurt, which was a core mindset of the album. He explained:

"In terms of our personal lives, these have been the darkest few years. There are some things you get over quickly, others that might take years, and some that you never get over. This was the first time that we have had to navigate certain losses in our lives, and we had to work out how to navigate that not only as individual human beings but as a band. You should try not to lose hope, but sometimes trying to find a positive angle is not the right thing. You just need to live with that situation and with the feelings that you're going through".

Lyrically, Nightmare Tripping deals with a number of emotions, ranging from honesty, acceptance, fear of admitting struggle, loving someone "through their darkest moments", anger, and nostalgia.

As with their previous release, Amazing Things, the band wanted their next album to sound heavier than the last, and have cited a number of influences such as Limp Bizkit, System of a Down, Deftones, Rage Against the Machine, Korn, and Nickelback. The band aimed to champion a blend of genres such as nu-metal and electronic, while also aiming for a "unified sound". To achieve this, the band worked with longtime producer Dan Lancaster, and also included collaborations with Nickelback and Sam Carter of Architects.

=== Songs ===
The first single and opening track, "Cellophane", was described as nu-metal, with alt-rock, electronic and metalcore elements, and is themed around "realising you're not as tough as you thought" and self-discovery. Damiani has said that the song is "that acknowledgement that shit's going south". Critics also compared some of the lyrical themes as a response to modern day struggles and uncertainties such as cost of living and "the looming prospect of World War III". The band cited inspiration from bands such as Limp Bizkit and Korn in the song, and stated that these were bands that got them into heavy music. The song's sound has also been compared to that of System of a Down. The band acknowledged the track's position as the opening track for the album as "the start of this journey on an album acknowledging that things maybe aren't as good as they were", going on to say that the rest of the album is "working through that and how you're going to live with that new reality".

"Disappear" addresses struggles of guilt and being unable to support somebody, as well as vulnerability, loneliness, and self-worth. Damiani called the song the "rawest" and "most personal" he had ever written, stating it was something he had been through himself with his partner. Wall of Sound's Daniel Hill compared the song to short story "The Tell-Tale Heart" by Edgar Allan Poe. The third track, "Somersaults", is themed around nostalgia of better times and reminiscing past optimism. The song has been described as stadium rock.

Damiani has described the title track, "Nightmare Tripping", as his favourite song from the album. He spoke of his experiences of sleep paralysis and an "uncertainty between dreams and reality" as inspiration for the song, explaining:

"I found it an interesting tool within a song to parallel the kind of emotions you go through when a relationship's falling apart, and you're in a really tricky spot, how those thoughts and feelings then creep into your dreams. You don't know if you're dreaming or not, and you wake up and you go, 'Did that happen in real life?' I thought that was an interesting idea of combining those realities within the song, and then for the album".

He also referred to "the blurring between living in the reality of a relationship falling apart". The band had heard that Ryan Peake's brother was a fan of theirs and thought that Nickelback would be a good collaboration for the song. Don Broco said they were honoured to collaborate with a band who had been one of their influences, and called the song a "dream come true". The band also compared the song's sound to System of a Down. Critics have praised the song for being a sporadic "amalgam of influences", with "immense" riffs and breakdowns but also "radio-friendly pop hooks".

The fifth track, "Ghost in the Night", is a more acoustic track. Its lyrics draw from ideas such as time perception, with inspiration from the film Interstellar, and an experience where Damiani thought he saw a ghost. He also noted it was one of his favourites and stated it was one of their quickest songs to write.

Described by Damiani as "tension-building", "True Believers" is a response to tensions arisen from the rise of far-right politics in the UK, Europe, and the USA in 2020s. Damiani cited "an alarming contrast between celebratory British patriotism and violent English nationalism" as the inspiration for writing the song during the 2024 Summer Olympics and 2024 United Kingdom riots. The song also touches on media skepticism, misinformation, and being told what to believe. Speaking about the inclusion of guest vocals from Architects' Sam Carter, Damiani said that Carter was "perfect" for the song for his aggression and what he stands for.

The seventh track "Euphoria", has been described by critics as techno-pop, with atmospheric Deftones infleunces, and by Damiani as a "wild card" with '80s influences. He stated the song was themed around first experiences. "Pacify Me" leans into an industrial sound, and was described as an "awakening song" in reference to opinions being silenced, similar to the themes of "True Believers". "Swimming Pools", with more pop, 80s, and electronic influences, has been compared to 5 Seconds of Summer, and is themed around white lies told to oneself to get through difficult times or to get something done.

"Hype Man" describes the "highs and lows of being a musician" and the gratefulness for and importance of friendships, as well as loneliness and depression. The song has been described as "cinematic" and nu-metal. The closing track "The Corner" has been described as "stripped-back" and was nearly not included as the band felt it wasn't heavy enough for the record, though they eventually decided it fit well after "Hype Man". Described as a "glimmer of love and hope", the song acts as an emotional closure for the album, and is themed around questioning oneself and self-doubt, but also moving forward from those doubts, hence "turning the corner" being the origin of the song's title.

== Critical reception ==
Professional ratings
Review scores
Source	Rating
The AU Review	4.5/5 stars
Kerrang!	4/5
New Noise Magazine	4.5/5 stars
Sputnikmusic	2.7/5
Wall of Sound	8.5/10

Nightmare Tripping was generally received positively by critics. Sarah Duggan of The AU Review called the album a "genre-hopping" experience and stated the band were "refining everything", commenting on the band's risk-taking. James Hickie of Kerrang! also praised the unpredictable nature of the album, comparing it to their previous records, noting "they've successfully accumulated all the stages of Broco in one go." Lamar Ramos of New Noise Magazine said the band were "leaning all the way into their impulses, following every weird turn until it somehow clicks", calling the album a "why not?" album. Dan Hill of Wall of Sound stated the album would "satisfy fans both new and old", and that it "delivers in abundance and showcases the range and growth" of the band. Simon K of Sputnikmusic, however, was more critical, critiquing the sporadic nature by stating "there's nothing here that feels smoothly integrated with everything else."

== Track listing ==
All tracks are written by Don Broco and Dan Lancaster, with additional writers where noted.

Nightmare Tripping track listing
No.	Title	Writer(s)	Length
1.	"Cellophane"	Joe Housley; Charlie Martin	3:17
2.	"Disappear"	Housley; Martin	3:51
3.	"Somersaults"		3:18
4.	"Nightmare Tripping" (featuring Nickelback)	Ben Jackson-Cook; Matthieu Woodburn	5:21
5.	"Ghost in the Night"	Housley; Martin	4:18
6.	"True Believers" (featuring Sam Carter)	Carter	3:32
7.	"Euphoria"	Jason Perry	3:26
8.	"Pacify Me"	Woodburn	3:41
9.	"Swimming Pools"	Andrew Goldstein	3:09
10.	"Hype Man"	Jackson-Cook	4:09
11.	"The Corner"	Perry	4:24
Total length:			42:26

== Personnel ==
Credits adapted from Tidal.

Don Broco

- Rob Damiani – lead vocals
- Simon Delaney – guitars, programming
- Matt Donnelly – drums, lead and backing vocals
- Tom Doyle – bass, programming

Additional musicians

- Chad Kroeger – vocals (4)
- Ryan Peake – guitar (4)
- Sam Carter – vocals (6)

Additional personnel

- Dan Lancaster – production, mixing, engineering (all except 9, 11)
- Ted Jensen – mastering
- The Nocturns – additional production (1, 2, 5, 7)
- Anton DeLost – additional production (3)
- Matthieu Guillaume Woodburn (Mattú) – additional production (4, 8)
- Adam Noble – mixing (5, 11)
- Jason Perry – production, engineering (9, 11)
- Zakk Cervini – mixing (9)
- Barbara Kuebel – artwork

== Accolades ==
Awards and nominations for Nightmare Tripping
Year	Award ceremony	Category	Result	Ref.
2026	Morecore Music Awards	Best Album	Nominated	

== Charts ==
Chart performance for Nightmare Tripping
Chart (2026)	Peak position
UK Albums (Official Charts)	7
UK Rock & Metal Albums (Official Charts)	1
Scottish Albums (Official Charts)	7
