= Technology (album) =

Studio album by Don Broco
- Released: 2 February 2018
- Recorded: 2016–2017
- Genres: Alternative rock; pop rock
- Length: 59:42
- Label: SharpTone
- Producers: Jason Perry; Dan Lancaster

Don Broco chronology
| Automatic (2015) | Technology (2018) | Amazing Things (2021) |

Singles from Technology
- 1. "Everybody" Released: 29 July 2016; 2. "Pretty" Released: 5 May 2017; 3. "Technology" Released: 17 July 2017; 4. "Stay Ignorant" Released: 6 October 2017; 5. "T-Shirt Song" Released: 31 October 2017; 6. "Come Out to L.A." Released: 5 January 2018; 7. "Greatness" Released: 16 March 2018

Professional ratings
Aggregate scores
| Source | Rating |
|---|---|
| Metacritic | 57/100 |
Review scores
| Source | Rating |
| The 730 Review | 5/5 |
| Clash | 3/10 |
| Drowned in Sound | 8/10 |
| Express & Star | 6/10 |
| Rock Sound | 9/10 |

Technology is the third studio album by English four-piece rock band Don Broco. It was released on 2 February 2018 through American label SharpTone Records.

== Release ==
On 24 June 2016, the band officially signed with SharpTone Records, which was co-founded by Shawn Keith and Nuclear Blast CEO Markus Staiger.

Don Broco released the single "Everybody" on 29 July 2016, along with an accompanying music video.

Prior to the release of Technology Don Broco released five more singles: "Pretty", "Technology", "Stay Ignorant", "T-Shirt Song" and "Come Out to LA" with accompanying music videos.

Prior to the release of the album, the band performed a single sold-out date in the UK at London's Alexandra Palace 11 November 2017, their biggest show to date.

== Track listing ==
| No. | Title | Length |
|---|---|---|
| 1. | "Technology" | 3:36 |
| 2. | "Stay Ignorant" | 3:15 |
| 3. | "T-Shirt Song" | 4:03 |
| 4. | "Come Out to LA" | 3:29 |
| 5. | "Pretty" | 3:35 |
| 6. | "The Blues" | 3:15 |
| 7. | "Tightrope" | 3:33 |
| 8. | "Everybody" | 3:20 |
| 9. | "Greatness" | 3:21 |
| 10. | "Porkies" | 4:09 |
| 11. | "Got to Be You" | 3:22 |
| 12. | "Good Listener" | 2:43 |
| 13. | "¥ (Yen)" | 3:32 |
| 14. | "Something to Drink" | 3:58 |
| 15. | "Blood in the Water" | 3:32 |
| 16. | "Potty Mouth" (Potty Mouth ends at 3:35 and an in-studio snippet of Something To Drink starts at 6:10) | 6:50 |
| Total length: | | 59:42 |

Japanese edition bonus tracks
| No. | Title | Length |
|---|---|---|
| 17. | "You Wanna Know" | 3:20 |
| 18. | "Superlove" | 3:28 |
| 19. | "Automatic" | 3:45 |
| 20. | "Money Power Fame" | 3:24 |
| 21. | "Nerve" | 3:34 |
| Total length: | | 77:19 |

== Personnel ==
Credits taken from Technology's liner notes.

=== Don Broco ===
- Rob Damiani – lead vocals, electronics
- Simon Delaney – lead and rhythm guitars
- Matt Donnelly – drums, percussion, electronic beats, backing vocals, co-lead vocals on "Come Out to LA"
- Tom Doyle – bass guitar

=== Other personnel ===
- Jason Perry – production
- Dan Lancaster – production
- drew BANG – engineering
- Romesh Dodangoda – production

== Charts ==
| Chart (2018) | Peak position |
|---|---|
| New Zealand Heatseeker Albums (RMNZ) | 6 |
| Scottish Albums (Official Charts) | 6 |
| UK Albums (Official Charts) | 5 |
| UK Rock & Metal Albums (Official Charts) | 1 |

== Certifications ==
Certifications and sales for Technology
| Region | Certification | Certified units/sales |
|---|---|---|
| United Kingdom (BPI) | Silver | 60,000^{‡} |
^{‡} Sales+streaming figures based on certification alone.
