= List of UK Rock & Metal Albums Chart number ones of 2022 =

The UK Rock & Metal Albums Chart is a record chart which ranks the best-selling rock and heavy metal albums in the United Kingdom. Compiled and published by the Official Charts Company, the data is based on each album's weekly physical sales and digital downloads.

== Chart history ==
Issue date	Album	Artist(s)	Record label(s)	Ref.
7 January	Nevermind	Nirvana	UMC	
14 January	Unplugged In New York	Nirvana	Geffen	
21 January	Caught on Stage - Live And Acoustic	The Temperance Movement	Earache	
28 January	Circus of Doom	Battle Beast	Nuclear Blast	
4 February	Amazing Things	Don Broco	SharpTone	
11 February	Requiem	Korn	Loma Vista	
18 February	4	Slash	BMG	
25 February	See Where the Night Goes	Goodbye June	Earache	
4 March	A Tribute to Led Zeppelin	Beth Hart	Provogue	
11 March	An Hour Before It's Dark	Marillion	Ear Music	
18 March	Impera	Ghost	Loma Vista	
25 March	Torpedo	Feeder	Big Teeth	
1 April	Greatest Hits	Foo Fighters	RCA	
8 April	Immutable	Meshuggah	Atomic Fire	
15 April	The Elephants of Mars	Joe Satriani	Ear Music	
22 April	Slipknot	Slipknot	Roadrunner	
29 April	Revelation	Stone Broken	Spinefarm	
6 May	Zeit	Rammstein	Spinefarm	
13 May	Back From the Dead	Halestorm	Parlophone	
20 May	Iowa	Slipknot	Roadrunner	
27 May	Zeit	Rammstein	Spinefarm	
3 June	Diamond Star Halos	Def Leppard	UMC	
10 June	Sinners Never Sleep	You Me At Six	UMC/Virgin	
17 June	Diamond Star Halos	Def Leppard	UMC	
24 June	Supernova	Nova Twins	Marshall	
1 July	Closure/Continuation	Porcupine Tree	Music For Nations	
8 July	Planet Zero	Shinedown	Parlophone	
15 July	Grit	Kut	Criminal	
22 July	Vol. 3: (The Subliminal Verses)	Slipknot	Roadrunner	
29 July	Nevermind	Nirvana	UMC	
5 August	Kickstart the Sun	Cats in Space	Harmony Factory	
12 August	Westgate Under Fire	Dub War	Earache	
19 August	Deceivers	Arch Enemy	Century Media	
26 August	Afterlife	Five Finger Death Punch	Better Noise	
2 September	Of Kingdom and Crown	Machine Head	Nuclear Blast	
9 September	The Sick, the Dying... and the Dead!	Megadeth	UMC	
16 September	Patient Number 9	Ozzy Osbourne	Columbia	
23 September	Animals	Pink Floyd	Rhino	
30 September	Dirt	Alice in Chains	Columbia	
7 October	The End, So Far	Slipknot	Roadrunner	
14 October	Under the Midnight Sun	The Cult	Black Hill	
21 October	Pawns & Kings	Alter Bridge	Napalm	
28 October	The Classic Symptoms of a Broken Spirit	Architects	Epitaph	
4 November	Triggerred!	Massive Wagons	Earache	
11 November	Loud Without Noise	Crawlers	Polydor	
18 November	Use Your Illusion	Guns N' Roses	Polydor/UMR	
25 November	Get Rollin'	Nickelback	BMG	
2 December	Get Rollin'	Nickelback	BMG	
9 December	The Dark Side of the Moon	Pink Floyd	Rhino	
16 December	Brutalism	Idles	Partisan	
23 December	The Dark Side of the Moon	Pink Floyd	Rhino	
30 December	The Dark Side of the Moon	Pink Floyd	Rhino	

== See also ==
- List of UK Rock & Metal Singles Chart number ones of 2022
