= Automatic (Don Broco album) =

Studio album by Don Broco
- Released: 7 August 2015
- Recorded: 2013–2015
- Studio: Angelic Studio (Brackley, Northamptonshire) Strongroom/AIR Lyndhurst Hall, London
- Genre: Pop rock; alternative rock
- Length: 48:39
- Label: Sony Music Entertainment
- Producer: Jason Perry

Don Broco chronology
Priorities (2012)	Automatic (2015)	Technology (2018)

Singles from Automatic
- 1. "You Wanna Know" Released: 22 August 2013; 2. "Automatic" Released: 18 May 2015; 3. "Superlove" Released: 13 July 2015; 4. "Nerve" Released: 13 November 2015

Professional ratings
Review scores
Source	Rating
Bring the Noise	8.5/10
Drowned in Sound	4/10
Mosh	10/10 stars
Rock Sound	8/10

Automatic is the second studio album by English four-piece rock band Don Broco. It was released in the United Kingdom on 7 August 2015. The album was included at number 13 on Rock Sound's top 50 releases of 2015 list. On 11 November 2016, Automatic was re-released in the United States and Canada through American label SharpTone Records.

== Track listing ==
Standard listing
No.	Title	Length
1.	"Superlove"	3:27
2.	"Automatic"	3:49
3.	"What You Do to Me"	3:12
4.	"Fire"	3:32
5.	"Nerve"	3:31
6.	"Let You Get Away"	3:42
7.	"I Got Sick"	2:47
8.	"Keep on Pushing"	3:19
9.	"Tough on You"	3:39
10.	"Further"	4:26
Total length:		35:16

Deluxe version
No.	Title	Length
11.	"Money Power Fame"	3:22
12.	"Bad Feeling"	3:27
13.	"Wrong Place Wrong Time"	3:05
14.	"You Wanna Know"	3:21

US and Canada re-release
No.	Title	Length
1.	"You Wanna Know"	3:21
2.	"Superlove"	3:27
3.	"Automatic"	3:44
4.	"Fire"	3:32
5.	"Nerve"	3:31
6.	"What You Do to Me"	3:12
7.	"Money Power Fame"	3:22
8.	"Keep on Pushing"	3:19
9.	"Tough on You"	3:39
10.	"Let You Get Away"	3:42
11.	"I Got Sick"	2:47
12.	"Wrong Place Wrong Time"	3:05
13.	"Bad Feeling"	3:27
14.	"Further"	4:26
15.	"You Wanna Know" (Club Sex Mix)	3:50

== Personnel ==
Credits taken from Automatic's liner notes.

=== Don Broco ===
- Rob Damiani – lead vocals, electronics
- Simon Delaney – lead and rhythm guitars
- Matt Donnelly – drums, percussion, electronic beats, co-lead vocals
- Tom Doyle – bass guitar

=== Production ===
- Jason Perry – producer

== Charts ==
Chart (2015)	Peak position
UK Albums (OCC)	6

== Certifications ==
Certifications and sales for Automatic
Region	Certification	Certified units/sales
United Kingdom (BPI)	Silver	60,000^{‡}
^{‡} Sales+streaming figures based on certification alone.

== Release history ==
Region	Release date	Format	Label
United Kingdom	7 August 2015	Digital download	Sony Music Entertainment

== Sources ==
- Bird, Ryan, ed. (January 2016). "Top 50 Releases of the Year". Rock Sound (208). London: Freeway Press Inc. ISSN 1465-0185.
