= You Wanna Know =

Single by Don Broco

from the album Automatic
- Released: 22 August 2013
- Recorded: 2013
- Genre: Alternative rock; post-hardcore
- Length: 3:23
- Label: Sony
- Songwriters: Rob Damiani; Simon Delaney; Matt Donnelly; Tom Doyle; Philip Rayner; Luke Rayner

Don Broco singles chronology
"Whole Truth" (2013)	"You Wanna Know" (2013)	"Automatic" (2015)

"You Wanna Know" is a single released by British rock band Don Broco.

== Release ==
The single was released on 22 August 2013 and was accompanied by a music video which was played by Kerrang! TV to help promote it. In October, the song had charted in the UK Singles Chart, peaking at 39, making it the band's first charting single. Once the single had been released, the EP of the same name was announced the same day and had been up for pre-order.

== Critical reception ==
Professional ratings
Review scores
Source	Rating
Rock Sound	8/10
Electric Banana	4/5 stars
The Guardian	3/5 stars
Deadpress	7/10 stars

The EP was well received by critics. Rock Sound praised its catchy-ness and its range of different sounds, from heavy rock of the featured single to the relaxing acoustic songs, and called it a positive successor to Priorities. Electric Banana applauded its very catchy groove with "tongue-in-cheek" lyrics, and stated that it was consistent with their last album. The Guardian called the album's sound a mixture of Busted and Biffy Clyro. The review continued to complement its blend of "snarling power chords and aggressive strobes" along with the lyrics and dynamic screams.

== Track listing ==
EP track list
No.	Title	Writer(s)	Length
1.	"You Wanna Know"	Don Broco	3:27
2.	"You Wanna Know" (Club Sex mix)	Don Broco	3:42
3.	"You Know You Like It" (AlunaGeorge cover)	Aluna Francis; George Reid	3:05
4.	"Here's the Thing" (acoustic)	Don Broco	3:12
5.	"Actors" (acoustic)	Don Broco	2:42
Total length:			16:08

== Chart performance ==
Chart (2013)	Peak position
UK Singles Chart	39
