= Priorities (album) =

Studio album by Don Broco
- Released: 13 August 2012
- Recorded: 2011–2012
- Genre: Alternative rock; pop rock; post-hardcore
- Length: 36:05
- Label: Sony Music Entertainment

Don Broco chronology
Priorities (2012)	Automatic (2015)

Singles from Priorities
- 1. "Priorities" Released: 11 May 2012; 2. "Hold On" Released: 16 November 2012; 3. "Whole Truth" Released: 19 April 2013

Professional ratings
Review scores
Source	Rating
Bring the Noise	9/10
Ourzone Magazine	8/10
Punktastic	4.5/5 stars
This Is Fake DIY	7/10

Priorities is the debut studio album by English four-piece alternative rock band Don Broco. It was released in the United Kingdom on 13 August 2012. The album has peaked to number 25 on the UK Albums Chart. The album includes the singles "Priorities", "Hold On", and "Whole Truth". After its release the band was nominated for "Best New Rock Artist" in the iTunes UK Best of 2012.

== Singles ==
- "Priorities" was released as the lead single from the album on 11 May 2012.
- "Hold On" was released as the second single from the album on 16 November 2012.
- "Whole Truth" was released as the third single from the album on 19 April 2013.

== Track listing ==
Standard listing
No.	Title	Length
1.	"Priorities"	3:38
2.	"Hold On"	2:59
3.	"Yeah Man"	3:16
4.	"Here's the Thing"	3:02
5.	"Whole Truth"	3:02
6.	"Fancy Dress"	3:26
7.	"In My World"	2:43
8.	"Back In the Day"	3:45
9.	"You Got It Girl"	4:22
10.	"Let's Go Back to School"	3:17
11.	"Actors"	2:33

Deluxe version bonus tracks
No.	Title	Length
12.	"Fancy Dress" (acoustic version)	2:38
13.	"Yeah Man" (acoustic version)	2:55
14.	"Priorities" (track by track)	13:53

== Charts ==
Chart (2012)	Peak position
UK Albums (OCC)	25

== Release history ==
Region	Release date	Format	Label
United Kingdom	13 August 2012	Digital download	Sony Music Entertainment
