= List of UK R&B Singles Chart number ones of 2022 =

The logo of the Official Charts Company, responsible for compiling all of the official music charts in the United Kingdom, including the R&B singles chart.

The UK R&B Singles Chart is a weekly chart that ranks the 40 biggest-selling singles and albums that are classified in the R&B genre in the United Kingdom. The chart is compiled by the Official Charts Company, and is based on both physical, and digital sales.

The following are the songs which have topped the UK R&B Singles Chart in 2022.

== Number-one singles ==
Chart date (week ending)	Song	Artist(s)	Record label	References
6 January	"Peru"	Fireboy DML and Ed Sheeran	Island/YBNL Nation	
13 January	"Coming for You"	SwitchOTR and A1 x J1	Robots and Humans	
20 January	"Peru"	Fireboy DML and Ed Sheeran	Island/YBNL Nation	
27 January	"Peru"	Fireboy DML and Ed Sheeran	Island/YBNL Nation	
3 February	"Peru"	Fireboy DML and Ed Sheeran	Island/YBNL Nation	
10 February	"Peru"	Fireboy DML and Ed Sheeran	Island/YBNL Nation	
17 February	"Peru"	Fireboy DML and Ed Sheeran	Island/YBNL Nation	
24 February	"Peru"	Fireboy DML and Ed Sheeran	Island/YBNL Nation	
3 March	"Peru"	Fireboy DML and Ed Sheeran	Island/YBNL Nation	
10 March	"Peru"	Fireboy DML and Ed Sheeran	Island/YBNL Nation	
17 March ^{[a]}	"Starlight"	Dave	Neighbourhood	
24 March ^{[a]}	"Starlight"	Dave	Neighbourhood	
31 March ^{[a]}	"Starlight"	Dave	Neighbourhood	
7 April ^{[a]}	"Starlight"	Dave	Neighbourhood	
14 April	"Starlight"	Dave	Neighbourhood	
21 April	"First Class"	Jack Harlow	Atlantic	
28 April	"First Class"	Jack Harlow	Atlantic	
5 May	"First Class"	Jack Harlow	Atlantic	
12 May	"First Class"	Jack Harlow	Atlantic	
19 May	"First Class"	Jack Harlow	Atlantic	
26 May	"First Class"	Jack Harlow	Atlantic	
2 June	"First Class"	Jack Harlow	Atlantic	
9 June	"First Class"	Jack Harlow	Atlantic	
16 June	"IFTK"	Tion Wayne and La Roux	Atlantic	
23 June	"IFTK"	Tion Wayne and La Roux	Atlantic	
30 June	"Jimmy Cooks"	Drake featuring 21 Savage	OVO/Republic	
7 July	"IFTK"	Tion Wayne and La Roux	Atlantic	
14 July	"IFTK"	Tion Wayne and La Roux	Atlantic	
21 July ^{[b]}	"Last Last"	Burna Boy	Atlantic	
28 July	"Last Last"	Burna Boy	Atlantic	
4 August	"Doja"	Central Cee	Central Cee	
11 August	"Doja"	Central Cee	Central Cee	
18 August	"Doja"	Central Cee	Central Cee	
25 August	"Last Last"	Burna Boy	Atlantic	
1 September	"Last Last"	Burna Boy	Atlantic	
8 September	"Last Last"	Burna Boy	Atlantic	
15 September	"Super Freaky Girl"	Nicki Minaj	Republic	
22 September	"Super Freaky Girl"	Nicki Minaj	Republic	
29 September	"Super Freaky Girl"	Nicki Minaj	Republic	
6 October	"Super Freaky Girl"	Nicki Minaj	Republic	
13 October	"Super Freaky Girl"	Nicki Minaj	Republic	
20 October	"Super Freaky Girl"	Nicki Minaj	Republic	
27 October	"Hide & Seek"	Stormzy	Def Jam	
3 November	"Hide & Seek"	Stormzy	Def Jam	
10 November	"Hide & Seek"	Stormzy	Def Jam	
17 November	"Rich Flex"	Drake and 21 Savage	OVO/Republic	
24 November	"Rich Flex"	Drake and 21 Savage	OVO/Republic	
1 December	"Rich Flex"	Drake and 21 Savage	OVO/Republic	
8 December ^{[b]}	"Hide & Seek"	Stormzy	Def Jam	
15 December ^{[b]}	"Firebabe"	Stormzy	0207/Merky	
22 December ^{[b]}	"Firebabe"	Stormzy	0207/Merky	
29 December	"Let Go"	Central Cee	Central Cee	

== Notes ==
- ^{a} - The single was simultaneously number one on the UK Singles Chart.
- ^{b} - The artist was simultaneously number one on the R&B Albums Chart.

== See also ==
- List of UK Singles Chart number ones of 2022
- List of UK R&B Albums Chart number ones of 2022
- List of UK Dance Singles Chart number ones of 2022
