= Don Broco =

English rock band

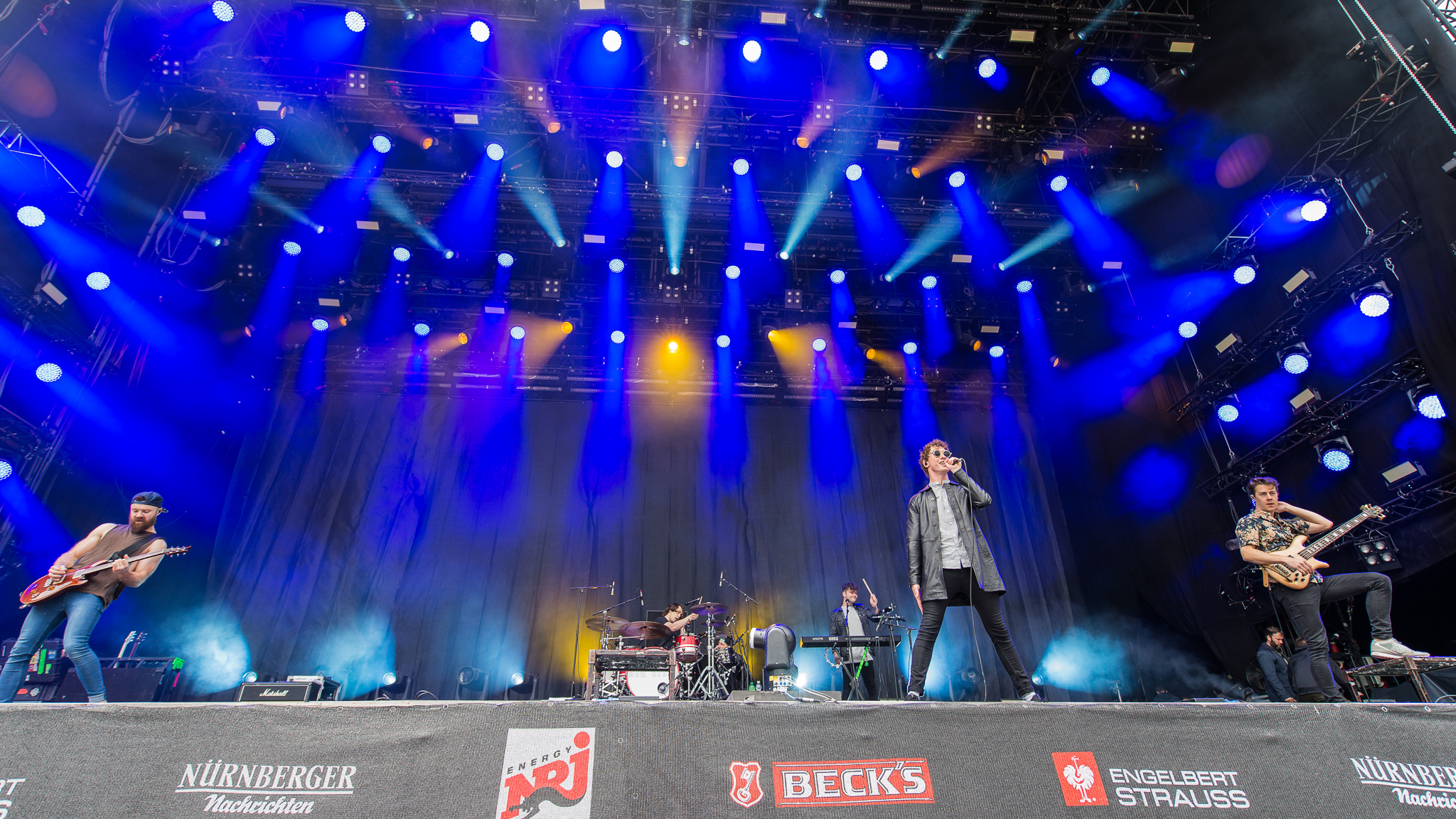
- Don Broco performing in 2017. L–R: Simon Delaney, Matt Donnelly, Rob Damiani, Tom Doyle

Background information
- Origin: Bedford, England
- Genres: Alternative rock; pop rock; post-hardcore; nu metal
- Years active: 2008–present
- Labels: Sony Music Entertainment UK; Epic; EmuBands; SharpTone; Fearless; Live Here Now
- Members: Rob Damiani; Simon Delaney; Matt Donnelly; Tom Doyle
- Past members: Luke Rayner
- Website: donbroco.com

Don Broco are an English rock band formed in Bedford in 2008. They consist of lead vocalist Rob Damiani, guitarist Simon Delaney, drummer Matt Donnelly, and bassist Tom Doyle. The band have released five albums: Priorities (2012); Automatic (2015); Technology (2018); Amazing Things (2021), which topped the UK Albums Chart; and Nightmare Tripping (2026).

== History ==
=== Formation (2008–2010) ===
The band's origins go back to before their university years during secondary school, attending Bedford Modern School, where they played their first gigs, but it was not until after studying at Nottingham University that they decided to become a band.

The band initially took on many different names, including "Summer fall" and "Club Sex". One of the group's ideas was "Don Loco", which was changed to Don Broco following guitarist Simon Delaney breaking his wrist in a football accident.

They first toured England in November 2008, playing gigs in places such as Leeds, Birmingham, Manchester, Swindon, Watford and County Durham amongst others.

They appeared at Camden Crawl and Download Festival in 2009, as well as supporting Enter Shikari on a short run of shows in May 2009.

Don Broco also played Underage Festival, at Victoria Park in London, UK, in both 2009 and 2010. They played Sonisphere festival 2010 on the Red Bull Bedroom Jam stage. The band then went on to support Enter Shikari at both their Christmas parties at Hatfield Forum in December 2010. In September 2010 Don Broco also played in a local festival called Amersham Summer Festival.

=== Big Fat Smile (2011) ===
In January 2011, they released the video to "Beautiful Morning", directed by Lawrence Hardy. The following month they released "Beautiful Morning" as a single. They released their EP Big Fat Smile on 14 February 2011. It was produced and engineered by Matt O'Grady and mixed by John Mitchell.

Don Broco, alongside Lower than Atlantis and Veara, supported We Are The Ocean on tour in April/May 2011. The band completed a third UK headline tour in May 2011 with support from Burn The Fleet. This run of shows included a show at the Alternative Escape Festival in Brighton, with Deaf Havana and at Hub Festival in Liverpool, as well as performances at Slam Dunk Festival North and South.

Over the summer 2011, Don Broco played a number of UK Festivals including Download Festival, Sonisphere Festival, Hevy Festival, Liverpool Sound City, Slam Dunk Festival, The Great Escape Festival. and at the Reading and Leeds festivals on the BBC Introducing stage which they were put forward for by the BBC Introducing programme which covers the Bedford area where the band is originally from.

An accompanying video to the band's B-Side "We Are On Holiday" off their "Dreamboy" single was released in August 2011. The single was made available to download on iTunes on 22 August 2011.

=== Priorities and Rayner's departure (2012–2013) ===
Don Broco supported Four Year Strong on their UK tour in January and February 2012. During this time, before the release of the debut album, Luke Rayner left the band due to commitment issues and different interests, however they are still on good terms. The band played Hit the Deck festival in Bristol and Nottingham, the Great Escape Festival in Brighton, Slam Dunk festivals in Leeds, Hertfordshire and Cardiff, and Redfest 2012. Don Broco were going to support Futures in April 2012, but their tour was postponed to July 2012.

On 23 March 2012, the band announced that they had signed a deal with Search and Destroy Records, a new venture between Raw Power Management and Sony Music. The band's first single "Priorities" from their debut album of the same name was released on 20 May, with the album released on 13 August. The band replaced original bassist with new bassist Tom Doyle. In April, the band supported You Me At Six in Dublin and Belfast on their Irish leg of their UK tour. The band replaced the support bill originally consisting of Kids In Glass Houses, The Skints and Mayday Parade, however the Irish leg was rescheduled after Josh Francheschi contracted tonsillitis. The band supported The Used on their April/May UK tour, alongside Marmozets.

The band released the second single from Priorities, titled "Actors" it was released on the same day as Don Broco's debut album, 13 August 2012. The video sees the boys performing and a storyline where the boys don't get on and putting all the chemistry between them on for the cameras.

On 20 September, "Hold On" was revealed to be the third single from the album and shortly after they supported Lower Than Atlantis along with The Dangerous Summer and Gnarwolves in Autumn 2012, followed by their first European tour, supporting Young Guns accompanied with Your Demise on their European leg in October 2012. It was announced that Don Broco will be the final support on the Rock Sound Riot Tour 2012 in November 2012 along with Billy Talent and Awolnation.

In February 2013, they embarked on their first headline tour of the United Kingdom with dates spanning from February to April. For the February to March dates they brought Mallory Knox and Hey Vanity along as support. On 3 February it was announced that all dates for the February leg of the tour had sold out. For the April dates Pure Love and Decade were the supporting acts.

On 30 March 2013 Don Broco performed a headlining set at the Radstock Festival, Liverpool, at the O2 Academy Liverpool. On the weekend of 23–25 August 2013, Don Broco performed on the main stage at the Reading and Leeds Festivals. The band concluded 2013 by releasing their new song "You Wanna Know" as a standalone single which also came as a bundled EP featuring various remixed versions of the song.

=== Automatic and signing to SharpTone Records (2014–2016) ===
Don Broco stated that the majority of 2014 would be focused around writing material for a new album and that they will headline a tour after its release. It was announced that the band will be supporting British band You Me at Six during their UK headline tour during March and April 2014, along with support act Young Kato.

In late August 2014 Don Broco were announced to headline 2015's Kerrang! tour in February, when they toured the UK with support from pop rock band We Are the In Crowd and metalcore bands Bury Tomorrow and Beartooth.

On 23 November 2014, the first single from the new album, titled "Money Power Fame", premiered on BBC Radio 1's "Rock Show" programme. A second single, "Fire", was streamed online on 26 January 2015. On 7 April 2015, the band released the third song off the new album titled "What You Do to Me", followed by music videos for the tracks "Automatic" and "Superlove" respectively.

Automatic was released on 7 August 2015. It is available in standard and deluxe versions; the deluxe version includes the standard ten tracks as well as four bonus tracks, two of these being previously released songs "Money Power Fame" and "You Wanna Know".

In April 2016, they supported Bring Me the Horizon on the European leg of their tour and also supported 5 Seconds of Summer between 15 April 2016 and 8 June 2016 on their Sounds Live Feels Live World Tour.

On 24 June 2016, the band officially signed with SharpTone Records, a label co-founded by Shawn Keith and Nuclear Blast CEO Markus Staiger.

=== Technology and "Action" (2017–2019) ===
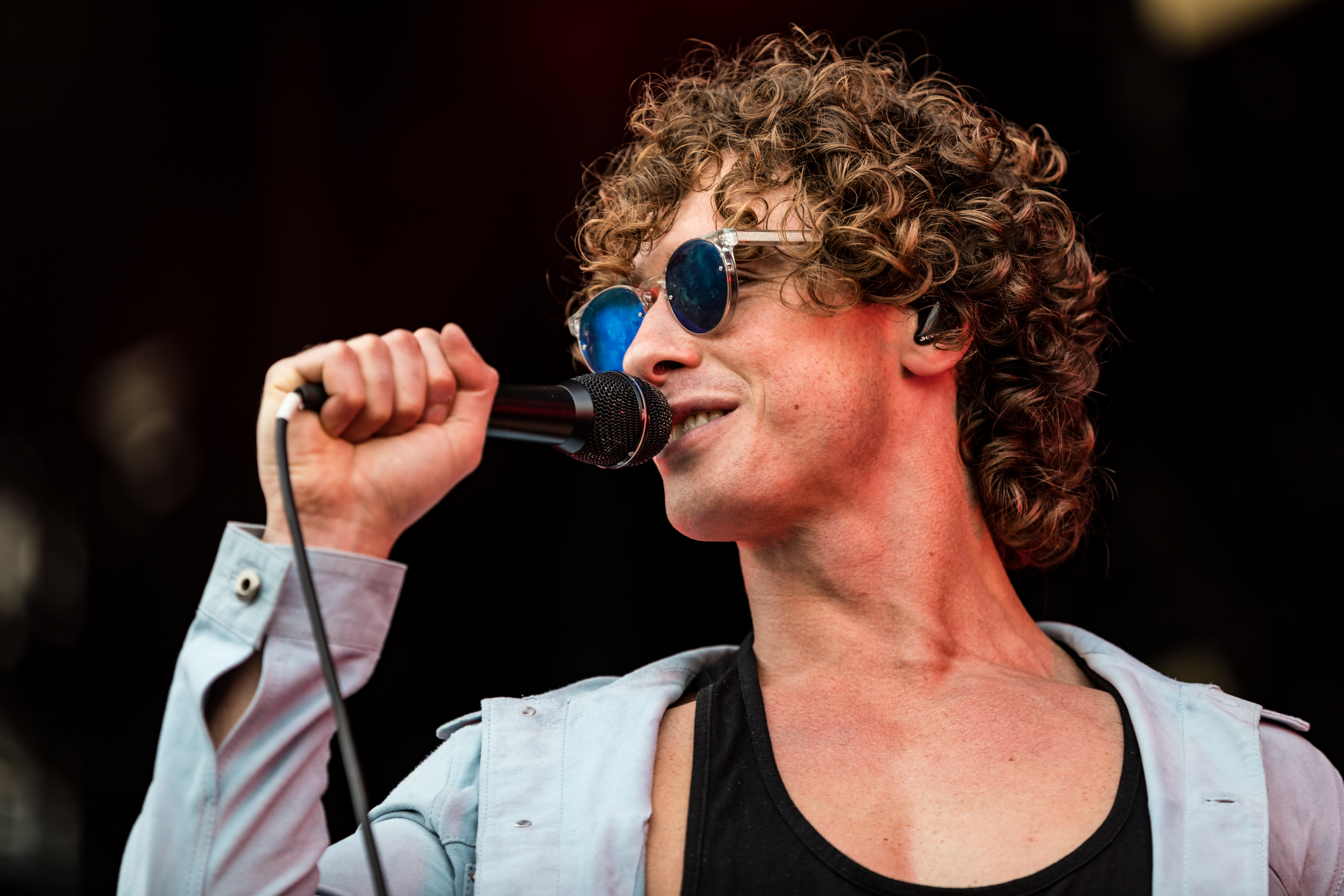
Don Broco (Rob Damiani) - Rock am Ring 2018

Don Broco released the single "Everybody" on 16 July 2016 along with an accompanying music video.

On 21 October 2016, SharpTone Records uploaded Don Broco's 2013 music video for "You Wanna Know" on their YouTube channel. It was also announced that Don Broco will rerelease Automatic in the United States on 11 November 2016 through SharpTone Records. The label uploaded the videos for "Money Power Fame", "Superlove", and "Automatic" to their YouTube channel prior to the release.

Don Broco released five singles for their third album Technology: "Pretty", "Technology", "Stay Ignorant", "T-Shirt Song" and "Come Out to LA". The band went on to play to a sold-out crowd at London's Alexandra Palace in November, 2017, their biggest show to date. Technology was released on 2 February 2018 via SharpTone Records.

In October to November 2016, Don Broco appeared as a support act for rock-metal band Bring Me the Horizon on their UK tour, playing arenas such as The O2 Arena. In 2018, Don Broco was one of the support bands for Our Last Night's North American and European tours. They also toured with Mike Shinoda of Linkin Park in support of his album Post Traumatic.

The band were nominated for 'Best British Live Act' at the 2019 Kerrang! Awards.

On 6 September 2019, Don Broco released the standalone single "Action". Two versions of this single were released, one solely featuring Don Broco vocalists Rob Damiani and Matt Donnelly while the second features Caleb Shomo (Beartooth), Tyler Carter (Issues), Taka Moriuchi (One Ok Rock) and Tilian Pearson (Dance Gavin Dance). The music video for "Action" won the award for Best Music Video by Heavy Music Awards.

=== Amazing Things and Live from Royal Albert Hall (2020–2024) ===
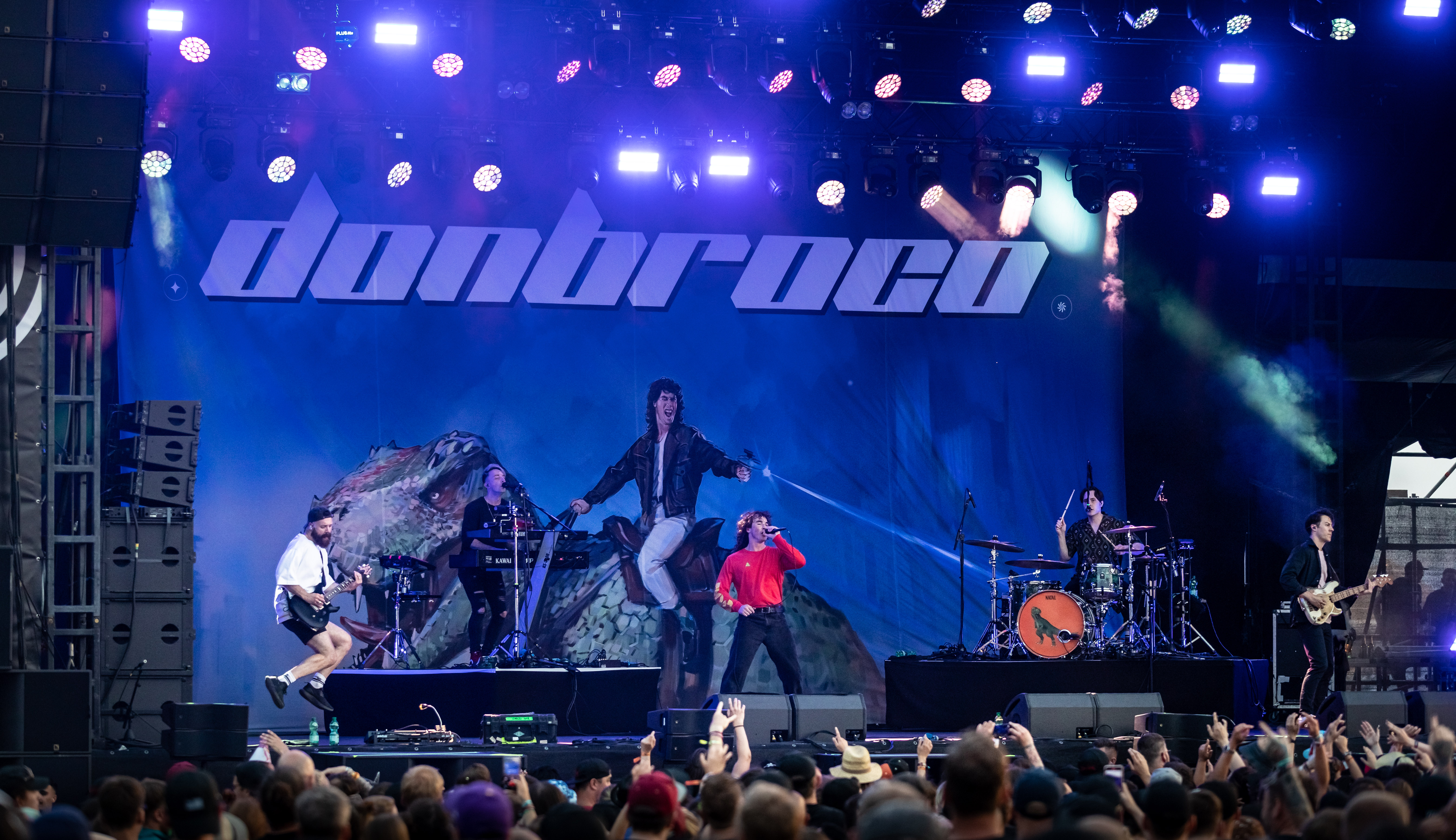
Don Broco - Rock am Ring 2022

Don Broco began writing new material for their fourth studio album in early 2020, and began recording in December 2020. They released a series of studio updates via YouTube before the release of the first single "Manchester Super Reds No.1 Fan" on Annie Mac’s Future Sounds, and its accompanying music video on 13 May 2021. Announcement of the album Amazing Things came the following day, along with a UK tour that took place in October–November 2021. The second single "Gumshield" was released on 8 July 2021, with a music video involving boxer Dave Allen.

The band headlined Slam Dunk Festival, in Leeds and Hatfield in September 2021, and also released a small set of warm-up gigs to precede the festival. The album was released on streaming platforms on 22 October 2021, initially reaching No. 91 on the UK Album Charts. The physical release had to be delayed due to a global vinyl shortage until 28 Jan 2022. During the build up to the physical release of the album, Don Broco did a run of intimate gigs at small venues in the UK to push physical sales of Amazing Things, the album then went on to claim the band's first UK No.1 album the week following its release. On 21 March 2022 the band played the Iconic Royal Albert Hall in London in support of Teenage Cancer Trust, this performance featured a live orchestra and Choir, something the band had only previously done with the Orchestral studio version of the single 'One True Prince'.

In April 2022, Don Broco released the single "Fingernails" on the 25th of the month to help promote their 2023 UK Arena Tour that was announced on the same day, with Papa Roach and Dance Gavin Dance in support. In 2023, they went on to open for American rock bands Pierce the Veil and The Used on their Creative Control Tour in North America.

On September 15, 2023, Don Broco independently released a standalone single "Birthday Party" along with a music video. On October 13, 2023, "Birthday Party (Party in the U.S.A. Remix)" featuring The Home Team, Ryan Oakes, Skyler Acord, and The Color 8 was released.

On November 24, 2023, Live from the Royal Albert Hall - the first live album by Don Broco - was released via Live Here Now label in aid of Teenage Cancer Trust.

In November and December 2023, the band headlined "The Birthday Party Tour" in the UK with support from Trash Boat and Ocean Grove.

=== Nightmare Tripping (2024–present) ===
In 2024, Don Broco played three live shows only, including a live set at 2000trees festival. In June of 2025, Don Broco played three headlining UK shows, and a live set at Download Festival.

On 10 July 2025, the band announced their World Tour would start in September with 5-date Australian leg.

On 25 July 2025, "Cellophane", the first single off the upcoming fifth album, was released on the official Don Broco YouTube channel, alongside an official music video.

Four further singles were then released before the full album; "Hype Man" on 29 July 2025, "Disappear" on 15 September 2025, "Euphoria" on 21 November 2025, and finally "Nightmare Tripping" featuring Nickelback on 13 February 2026.

Their fifth studio album, Nightmare Tripping, was released via Fearless Records on 27 March 2026. On the same day, they also announced their Nightmare Tripping Europe/UK 2026 Tour on their official Instagram account.

== Musical style ==
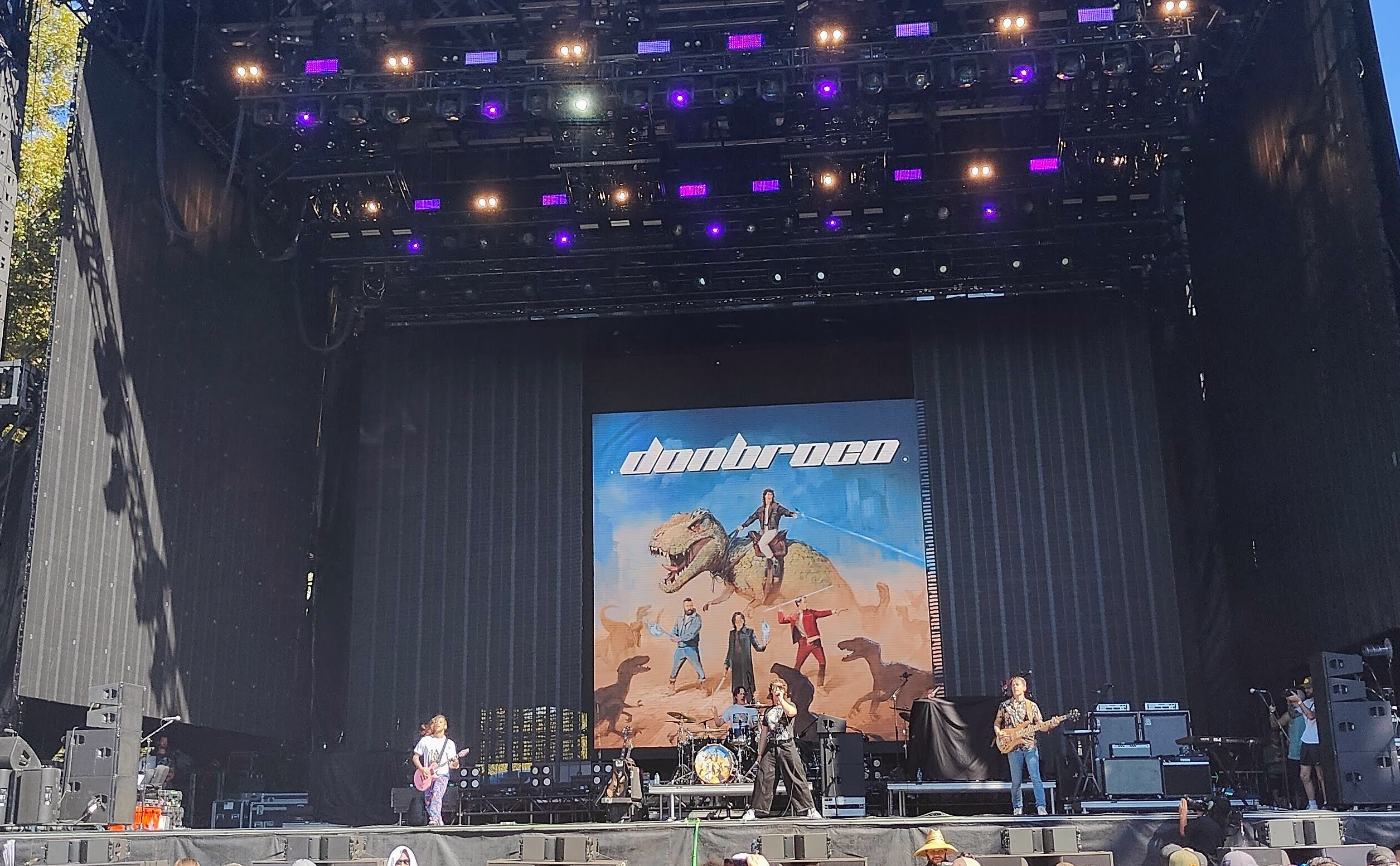
Don Broco playing at Aftershock Festival 2023.

Primarily categorised as alternative rock, the band's style has also been described as pop rock and post-hardcore by reviewers; AltSounds reviewed their debut album Priorities to have elements of all three genres. AlreadyHeard expressed that the album was mostly alternative rock, yet praised the album's range of different moods, going from energetic to "cheeky" songs. A live review from Virtual Festivals reviewed the band's performance at the Leeds Festival in 2013 and proclaimed that the changes in the band's musical style compared to their earlier music from the likes of the Living the Dream and Thug Workout EPs were substantial. They claimed that due to this some members of their audience were unsatisfied and that the new material was dulled by a slower tempo and a "love-letter" lyrical style.

RocksFreaks.Net expressed the Thug Workout EP to be a half mixture of nu metal and post-hardcore due to the mixture of half-rap verses and screams and related their sound to that of A Day to Remember. The reviews for the third EP Big Fat Smile primarily called it a general rock album with elements of rock pop. Rocksound called the album a "good mix of Brit-rock riffs, sarcastic lyrical content and jovial pop sensibilities". with Alter the Press! also backing this statement up, placing them with the likes of many other "British rock hopefuls for 2011".

Their second album Automatic saw the band change to a poppier sound with "funk and new wave elements". Third album Technology saw yet another change with a "far rockier sound", but still with some synth elements. Reviews of their fourth album Amazing Things show a change to a mix of nu metal, rap metal and post-hardcore, more similar to earlier EPs.

Don Broco influences include bands and artists such as Linkin Park, N.E.R.D., System of a Down, Blur, Biffy Clyro, Red Hot Chili Peppers, Kanye West, Limp Bizkit, U2, Incubus, Phillip Bailey, Phil Collins, Glassjaw, Muse, Miguel, Every Time I Die, Die Antwoord, Will Haven, No Doubt, The Dillinger Escape Plan, Deftones, Thrice, Rage Against the Machine, New Found Glory, Brand New, Sikth, Aconite Thrill, Fireapple Red, Ash, Radiohead, Prince, Reuben, David Bowie, and Alkaline Trio.

== Members ==
Don Broco live at Rock am Ring 2022

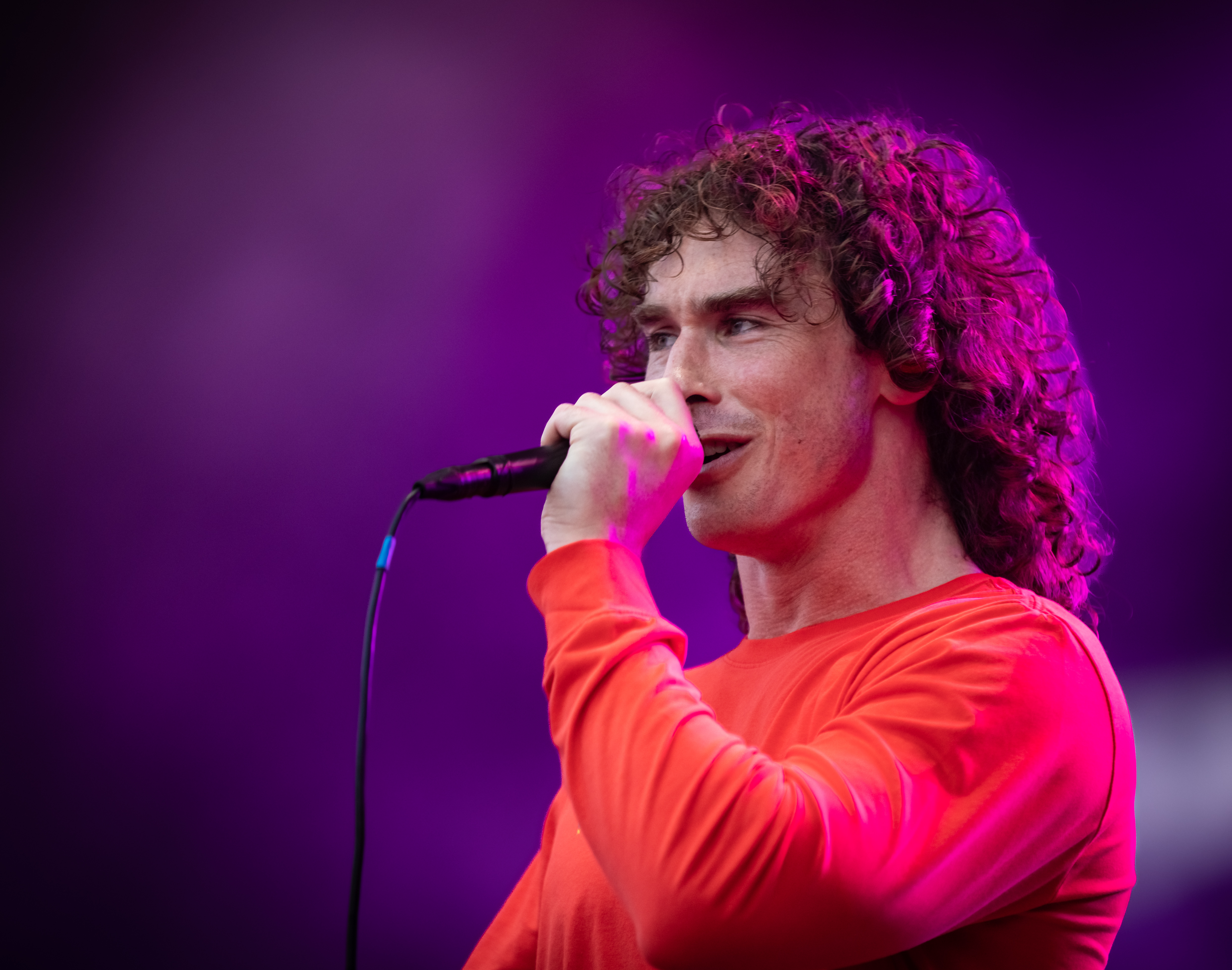
Rob Damiani

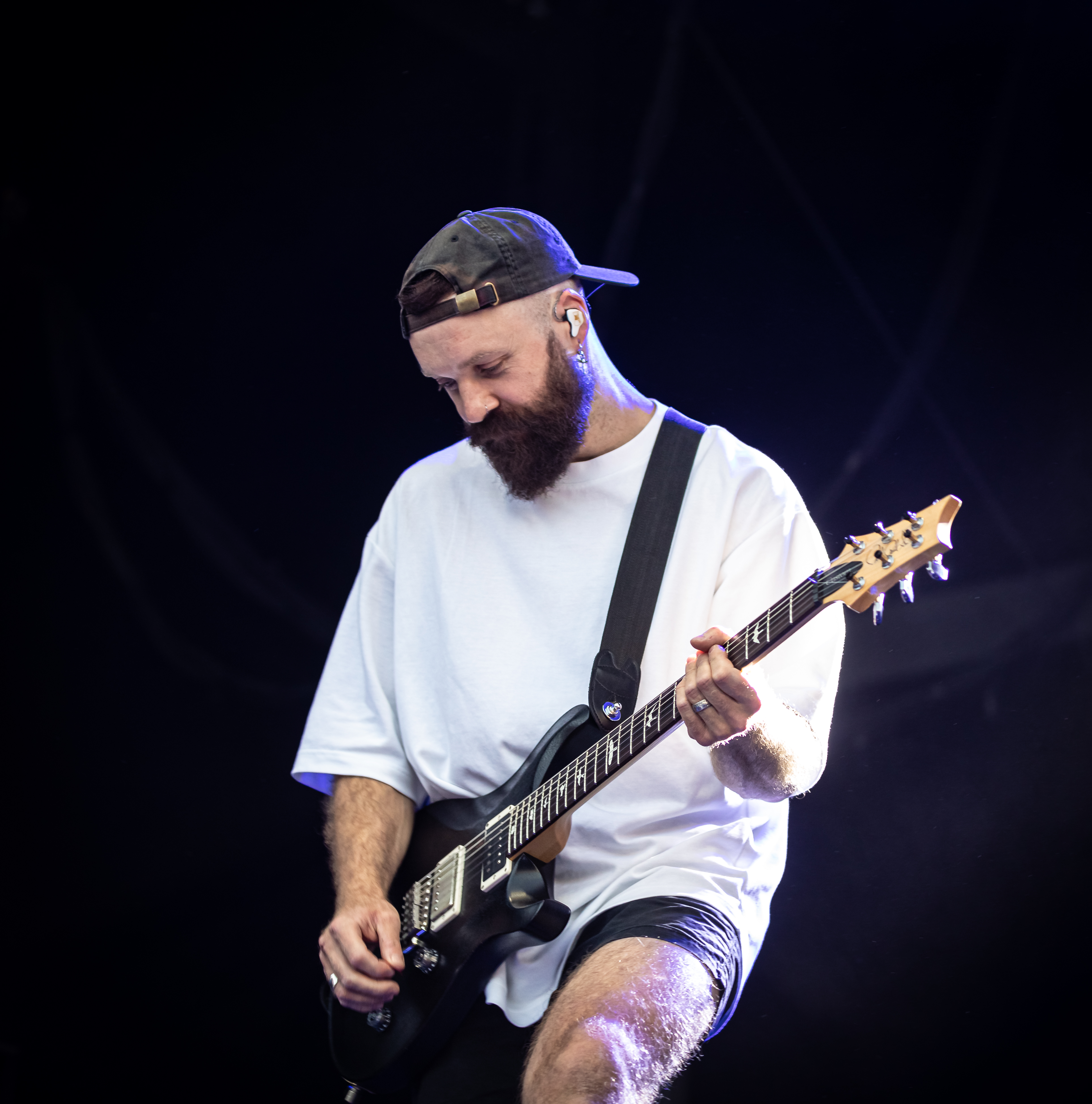
Simon Delaney

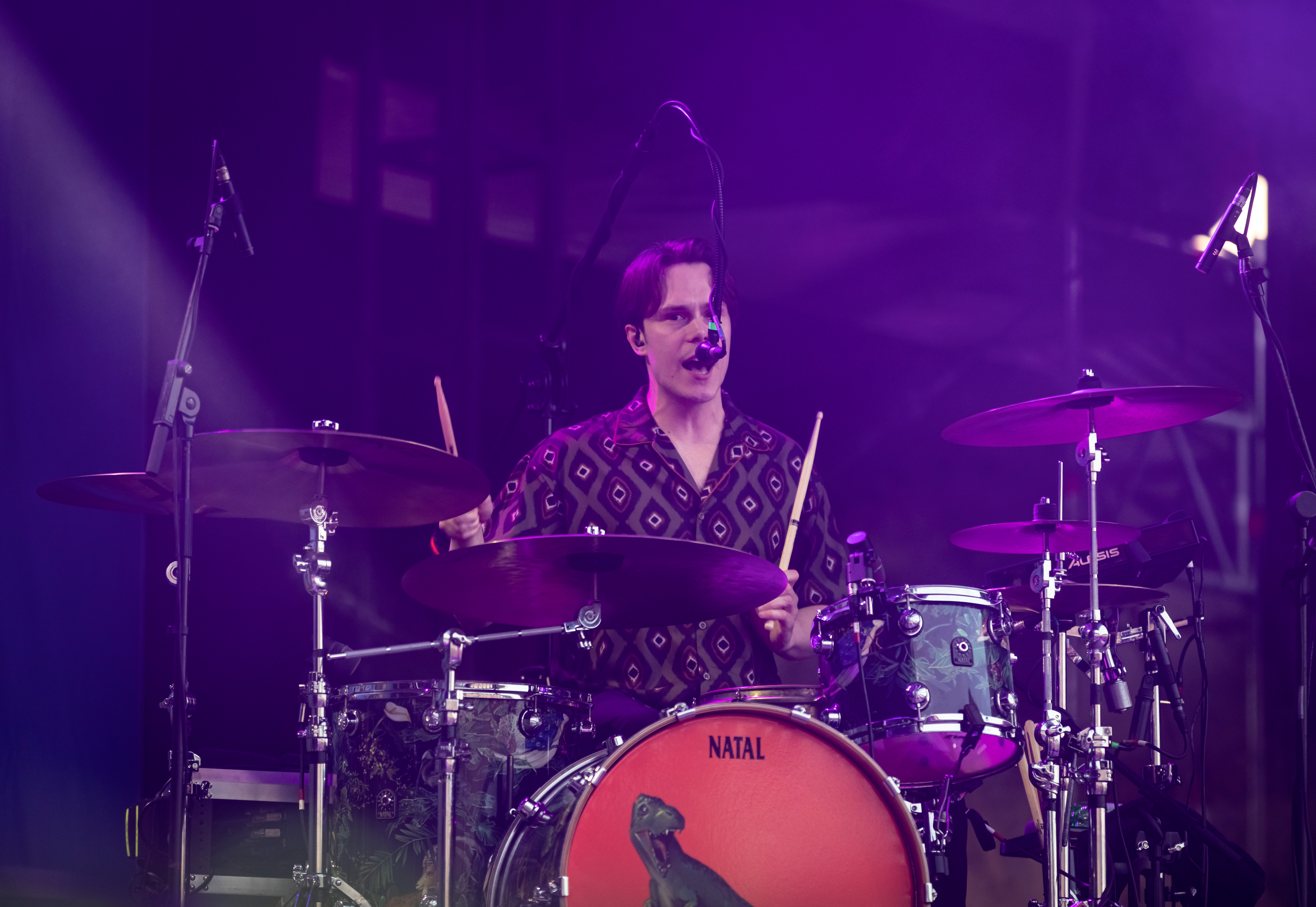
Matt Donnelly

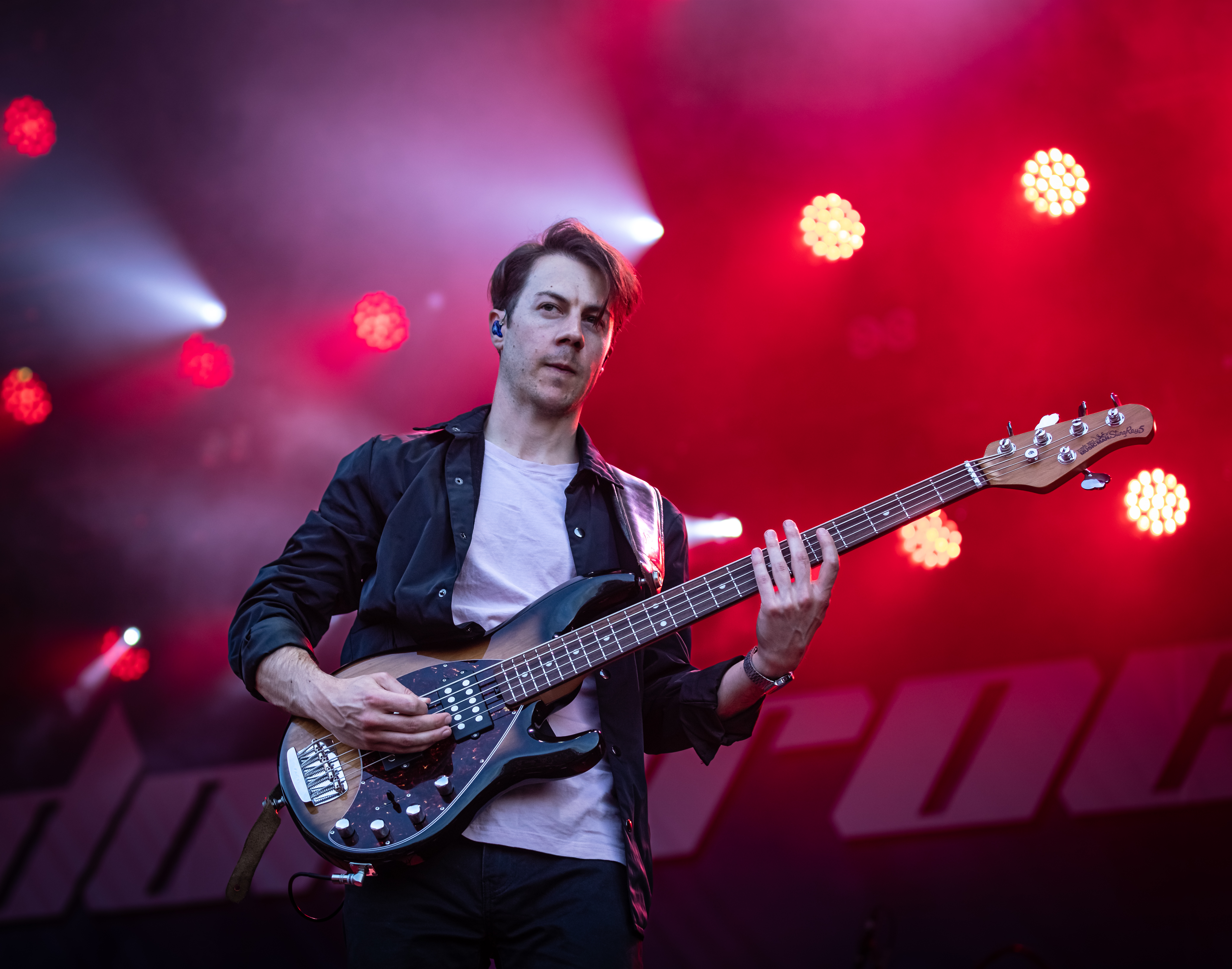
Tom Doyle

Current

- Rob Damiani – lead vocals, electronics (2008–present)
- Simon Delaney – guitar (2008–present)
- Matt Donnelly – drums, lead and backing vocals (2008–present)
- Tom Doyle (Tommy Tumbles) – bass, programming (2012–present)

Touring

- Adam Marc – keyboards, backing vocals, electronics (2014–2022)
- Pete Daynes – keyboards, backing vocals, electronics (2022–present)
- Marc Okubo – guitar (2023–present)

Former

- Luke Rayner – bass (2008–2011)

Timeline

== Discography ==
Don Broco discography
- Studio albums: 5
- Extended plays: 4
- Live albums: 1
- Singles: 26
- Music videos: 36

=== Studio albums ===
List of studio albums, with selected chart positions and certifications
Title	Album details	Peak chart positions			Certifications
Title	Album details	UK	UK Rock	SCO	Certifications
Priorities	Released: 13 August 2012; Labels: Sony; Formats: CD, digital download	25	1	52	
Automatic	Released: 7 August 2015; Label: Epic; Formats: CD, digital download	6	1	9	BPI: Silver
Technology	Released: 2 February 2018; Label: SharpTone; Formats: CD, digital download, vinyl	5	1	6	BPI: Silver
Amazing Things	Released: 22 October 2021; Label: SharpTone; Formats: Cassette, CD, digital download, vinyl	1	1	3	
Nightmare Tripping	Released: 27 March 2026; Label: Fearless; Formats: Cassette, CD, digital download, vinyl	7	1	7	

=== EPs ===
List of extended plays
Title	EP details
Living the Dream	Released: 2008; Label: EmuBands; Format: Digital download
Thug Workout	Released: 4 November 2008; Label: EmuBands; Format: Digital download
Big Fat Smile	Released: 14 February 2011; Label: EmuBands; Format: Digital download
You Wanna Know	Released: 4 October 2013; Label: Sony Music; Format: Digital download

=== Live albums ===
List of live albums
Title	Details
Live from The Royal Albert Hall	Released: 24 November 2023; Label: Live Here Now; Format: CD, vinyl, digital download

=== Singles ===
List of singles, with selected chart positions
Title	Year	Peak chart positions			Album
Title	Year	UK	UK Rock	US Hard Rock	Album
"Beautiful Morning"	2011	—	—	—	Big Fat Smile EP
"Dreamboy"	2011	—	—	—	Big Fat Smile EP
"Priorities"	2012	—	—	—	Priorities
"Hold On"	2012	—	—	—	Priorities
"Whole Truth"	2013	—	—	—	Priorities
"You Wanna Know"	2013	39	1	—	You Wanna Know EP
"Automatic"	2015	—	16	—	Automatic
"Superlove"	2015	—	19	—	Automatic
"Everybody"	2016	—	25	—	Technology
"Pretty"	2017	—	23	—	Technology
"Technology"	2017	—	28	—	Technology
"Stay Ignorant"	2017	—	—	—	Technology
"T-Shirt Song"	2017	—	31	—	Technology
"Come Out to LA"	2017	—	—	—	Technology
"Greatness"	2018	—	—	—	Technology
"Half Man Half God"	2019	—	—	—	Non-album singles
"Action"	2019	—	—	—	Non-album singles
"Manchester Super Reds No.1 Fan"	2021	—	—	—	Amazing Things
"Gumshield"	2021	—	—	—	Amazing Things
"One True Prince"	2021	—	—	—	Amazing Things
"One True Prince (Orchestral version - Live from the Abbey Road)"	2021	—	—	—	Non-album singles
"Fingernails"	2022	—	—	—	Non-album singles
"Birthday Party"	2023	—	—	—	Non-album singles
"Birthday Party (Party in the U.S.A. Remix)"	2023	—	—	—	Non-album singles
"Cellophane"	2025	—	—	—	Nightmare Tripping
"Hype Man"	2025	—	—	—	Nightmare Tripping
"Disappear"	2025	—	—	—	Nightmare Tripping
"Euphoria"	2025	—	—	—	Nightmare Tripping
"Nightmare Tripping" (with Nickelback)	2026	—	—	24	Nightmare Tripping
"True Believers" (feat. Sam Carter of Architects)	2026	—	—	—	Nightmare Tripping
"—" denotes single that did not chart or was not released.

=== Other appearances ===
- "Come Out to LA – Acoustic" (Punk Goes Acoustic Vol. 3, 2019)

=== Music videos ===
List of music videos, showing director(s) and year released
Year	Song	Album	Director	Type	Link
2009	"Thug Workout"	Thug Workout EP	Don Broco	Performance	
2010	"Dreamboy"	Big Fat Smile EP	Lawrence Hardy	Narrative	
2010	"Top of the World"	Big Fat Smile EP	Lawrence Hardy	Narrative	
2011	"Beautiful Morning"	Big Fat Smile EP	Lawrence Hardy	Narrative	
2011	"We're on Holiday"	Big Fat Smile EP	Lawrence Hardy	Live footage	
2012	"Priorities"	Priorities	Don Broco	Narrative	
2012	"Actors"	Priorities	Don Broco	Performance	
2012	"Hold On"	Priorities	Don Broco	Performance	
2012	"Fancy Dress"	Priorities	Don Broco	Live Footage	
2013	"Whole Truth"	Priorities	Don Broco	Narrative	
2013	"You Wanna Know"	You Wanna Know EP	Don Broco	Performance	
2014	"Money Power Fame"	Automatic	Don Broco	Performance	
2015	"Automatic"	Automatic	Don Broco	Narrative	
2015	"Superlove"	Automatic	Don Broco	Narrative	
2015	"Nerve"	Automatic	Don Broco	Narrative	
2016	"Everybody"	Technology	Dominar Films	Narrative	
2017	"Pretty"	Technology	Dominar Films	Narrative	
2017	"Technology"	Technology	Dominar Films	Narrative	
2017	"Stay Ignorant"	Technology	Dominar Films	Live footage	
2017	"T-Shirt Song"	Technology	Dominar Films	Performance	
2017	"Come Out to LA"	Technology	Dominar Films	Narrative	
2018	"Greatness"	Technology	Dominar Films	Narrative	
2019	"Half Man Half God"	Non-album single	A-Sidefilms	Live Footage, Narrative	
2019	"Action"	Non-album single	Benjamin Roberds	Narrative	
2021	"Manchester Super Reds No.1 Fan"	Amazing Things	Do Not Entry	Narrative	
2021	"Gumshield"	Amazing Things	Do Not Entry	Narrative	
2021	"One True Prince"	Amazing Things	Blindeye Films	Narrative	
2021	"Uber"	Amazing Things	Blindeye Films	Performance	
2021	"Endorphins"	Amazing Things	Wanderland Films	Narrative	
2021	"Bruce Willis"	Amazing Things	Sean Barrett	Narrative	
2022	"Fingernails"	Non-album singles	Harry Lindley	Narrative	
2023	"Birthday Party"	Non-album singles	Frasier Cheng-Binns	Narrative	
2025	"Cellophane"	Nightmare Tripping	Harry Lindley	Performance	
2025	"Disappear"	Nightmare Tripping	Harry Lindley	Performance	
2026	"Nightmare Tripping"	Nightmare Tripping	Gordy De St. Jeor	Narrative	
2026	"True Believers"	Nightmare Tripping	Tom Pullen and Tobias James	Performance	

== Awards and nominations ==
Award Ceremony	Year	Nominated work	Category	Result	Ref.
Kerrang! Awards	2013	Priorities	Best Album	Nominated	
Berlin Music Video Awards	2020	"Action"	Most Trashy	Nominated	
Heavy Music Awards	2020	"Action"	Best Video	Won	
Morecore Music Awards	2026	Nightmare Tripping	Best Album	Nominated	
