= Virtual Festivals =

UK music website

- Industry: Music festivals
- Founder: Steve Jenner
- Headquarters: London, London, UK
- Area served: Worldwide
- Website: Virtual Festivals

Virtual Festivals was a UK music website that publishes news, reviews, listings, videos, photographs, interviews and competitions on music festivals. It was launched by Steve Jenner in 1999.

Virtual Festivals was written about in The Independent's "10 Best Sites of the Week" on 26 May 2001. The site joined Facebook in 2007 and was described by the Birmingham Post as "the first social networking festival portal".

The site held its own annual awards show, the Virtual Festivals Awards, which has been covered by The Independent.

Material from the Virtual Festivals site has been reproduced by publications such as The Spectator.

The Virtual Festivals business was put up for sale by tender in February 2014.

== Festivals ==
With a team of more than 200 writers and photographers, the site covers major UK and international music festivals, including:

- Glastonbury Festival
- Reading Festival
- Leeds Festival
- T in the Park
- Isle of Wight Festival
- V Festival
- Download Festival
- Sonisphere Festival
- RockNess
