= List of UK R&B Albums Chart number ones of 2022 =

The logo of the Official Charts Company, responsible for compiling all of the official music charts in the United Kingdom, including the R&B albums chart.

The UK R&B Albums Chart is a weekly chart, first introduced in October 1994, that ranks the 40 biggest-selling albums that are classified in the R&B genre in the United Kingdom. The chart is compiled by the Official Charts Company, and is based on sales of CDs, downloads, vinyl and other formats over the previous seven days.

The following are the number-one albums of 2022

== Number-one albums ==
Issue date	Album	Artist(s)	Record label	Ref.
7 January	Back to Black	Amy Winehouse	Island	
14 January ^{[a]}	Dawn FM	The Weeknd	Republic/XO	
21 January	Back to Black	Amy Winehouse	Island	
28 January	Travelling Without Moving	Jamiroquai	Sony	
4 February	Dawn FM	The Weeknd	Republic/XO	
11 February	Psychodrama	Dave	Dave Neighbourhood	
18 February	Never Forget My Love	Joss Stone	Bay Street	
25 February	Back to Black	Amy Winehouse	Island	
4 March ^{[a]}	23	Central Cee	Central Cee	
11 March	Reason to Smile	Kojey Radical	Atlantic	
18 March	Back to Black	Amy Winehouse	Island	
25 March	Pier Pressure	Arrdee	Island	
1 April	Gifted	Koffee	Columbia	
8 April	Never Been Ordinary	French the Kid	Dropout UK	
15 April	The Line is a Curve	Kae Tempest	Fiction	
22 April ^{[a]}	Noughty by Nature	Digga D	CGM/EGA	
29 April	Original Pirate Material	The Streets	Pure Groove	
6 May	Dawn FM	The Weeknd	Republic/XO	
13 May	Alpha Place	Knucks	No Days Off	
20 May	Mr. Morale & the Big Steppers	Kendrick Lamar	Polydor	
27 May	Chasing Euphoria	M Huncho	Island	
3 June	Legacy	Nafe Smallz	Nafe Smallz	
10 June	Prince and the Revolution: Live	Prince and The Revolution	Sony	
17 June	Mr. Morale & the Big Steppers	Kendrick Lamar	Polydor	
24 June	The Gold Experience	Prince	Sony	
1 July	Donda	Kanye West	Virgin	
8 July	Big Pakachino	Pak-Man	Pakman	
15 July ^{[b]}	Love, Damini	Burna Boy	Atlantic	
22 July	We're All Alone in This Together	Dave	Dave Neighbourhood	
29 July	Bamk Statement	Ms Banks	Ms Banks	
5 August	Back to Black	Amy Winehouse	Island	
12 August	Curtain Call 2	Eminem	Interscope	
19 August	Cheat Codes	Danger Mouse and Black Thought	BMG	
26 August	Close to Home	Aitch	Capitol	
2 September	Mr. Morale & the Big Steppers	Kendrick Lamar	Polydor	
9 September	The R&B Throwback Album	Various Artists	Sony	
16 September	Legend	John Legend	EMI	
23 September	The R&B Throwback Album	Various Artists	Sony	
30 September	Lap 5	D-Block Europe	D-Block Europe	
7 October	Melt My Eyez See Your Future	Denzel Curry	Loma Vista	
14 October	The R&B Throwback Album	Various Artists	Sony	
21 October	Cold Feet	Rimzee	Rimzee	
28 October	Hugo	Loyle Carner	EMI	
4 November	Good Kid, M.A.A.D City	Kendrick Lamar	Polydor/UMR	
11 November	Good Kid, M.A.A.D City	Kendrick Lamar	Polydor/UMR	
18 November	Back to Black	Amy Winehouse	Island	
25 November	Respect the Come Up	Meekz	Neighbourhood Recordings	
2 December ^{[a]} ^{[b]}	This Is What I Mean	Stormzy	0207/Merky	
9 December ^{[b]}	This Is What I Mean	Stormzy	0207/Merky	
16 December ^{[b]}	This Is What I Mean	Stormzy	0207/Merky	
23 December	This Is What I Mean	Stormzy	0207/Merky	

== Notes ==
- ^{a} - The album was simultaneously number-one on the UK Albums Chart.
- ^{b} - The artist was simultaneously number-one on the R&B Singles Chart.

== See also ==
- List of UK Albums Chart number ones of the 2020s
- List of UK R&B Singles Chart number ones of 2022
