= List of UK Rock & Metal Singles Chart number ones of 2022 =

The UK Rock & Metal Singles Chart is a record chart which ranks the best-selling rock and heavy metal songs in the United Kingdom. Compiled and published by the Official Charts Company, the data is based on each track's weekly physical sales and digital downloads . The first number one of the year was "Don't Stop Me Now" by Queen.

== Chart history ==
Issue date	Single	Artist(s)	Record label(s)	Ref.
7 January	"Don't Stop Me Now"	Queen	Island	
14 January	"Don't Stop Me Now"	Queen	Island	
21 January	"Won't Stand Down"	Muse	Warner	
28 January	"I'd Do Anything for Love (But I Won't Do That)"	Meat Loaf	Virgin	
4 February	"I'd Do Anything for Love (But I Won't Do That)"	Meat Loaf	Virgin	
11 February	"Don't Stop Me Now"	Queen	Island	
18 February	"Iris"	Goo Goo Dolls	Warner	
25 February	"Don't Stop Me Now"	Queen	Island	
4 March	"Don't Stop Me Now"	Queen	Island	
11 March	"Don't Stop Me Now"	Queen	Island	
18 March	"Iris"	Goo Goo Dolls	Warner	
25 March	"Iris"	Goo Goo Dolls	Warner	
1 April ^{[b]}	"Best of You"	Foo Fighters	RCA	
8 April	"Iris"	Goo Goo Dolls	Warner	
15 April	"Hey, Hey, Rise Up!"	Pink Floyd featuring Andriy Khlyvnyuk	Rhino	
22 April	"Iris"	Goo Goo Dolls	Warner	
29 April	"Iris"	Goo Goo Dolls	Warner	
6 May	"Iris"	Goo Goo Dolls	Warner	
13 May	"Iris"	Goo Goo Dolls	Warner	
20 May	"The Foundations of Decay"	My Chemical Romance	Warner	
27 May	"Iris"	Goo Goo Dolls	Warner	
3 June	"Iris"	Goo Goo Dolls	Warner	
10 June	"Don't Stop Me Now"	Queen	Island	
17 June	"Iris"	Goo Goo Dolls	Warner	
24 June	"Iris"	Goo Goo Dolls	Warner	
1 July	"Bohemian Rhapsody"	Queen	Island	
8 July	"Master of Puppets"	Metallica	Blackened/Vertigo	
15 July	"Master of Puppets"	Metallica	Blackened/Vertigo	
22 July	"Master of Puppets"	Metallica	Blackened/Vertigo	
29 July	"Master of Puppets"	Metallica	Blackened/Vertigo	
5 August	"Master of Puppets"	Metallica	Blackened/Vertigo	
12 August	"Master of Puppets"	Metallica	Blackened/Vertigo	
19 August	"Iris"	Goo Goo Dolls	Warner	
26 August	"Iris"	Goo Goo Dolls	Warner	
2 September	"Iris"	Goo Goo Dolls	Warner	
9 September	"Iris"	Goo Goo Dolls	Warner	
16 September	"Iris"	Goo Goo Dolls	Warner	
23 September	"Iris"	Goo Goo Dolls	Warner	
30 September	"Iris"	Goo Goo Dolls	Warner	
7 October	"Iris"	Goo Goo Dolls	Warner	
14 October	"Iris"	Goo Goo Dolls	Warner	
21 October	"Edging"	Blink-182	Columbia	
28 October	"Iris"	Goo Goo Dolls	Warner	
4 November	"Iris"	Goo Goo Dolls	Warner	
11 November	"Iris"	Goo Goo Dolls	Warner	
18 November	"Iris"	Goo Goo Dolls	Warner	
25 November	"Iris"	Goo Goo Dolls	Warner	
2 December	"Iris"	Goo Goo Dolls	Warner	
9 December	"Iris"	Goo Goo Dolls	Warner	
16 December	"Iris"	Goo Goo Dolls	Warner	
23 December	"Iris"	Goo Goo Dolls	Warner	
30 December	"Iris"	Goo Goo Dolls	Warner	

== Notes ==
- ^{a} – The single was simultaneously number-one on the singles chart.
- ^{b} - The artist was simultaneously number one on the UK Rock & Metal Albums Chart.

== See also ==
- List of UK Rock & Metal Albums Chart number ones of 2022
