= Amazing Things (Don Broco album) =

Studio album by Don Broco
- Released: 22 October 2021
- Recorded: 2020
- Studio: Decoy Studios (Woodbridge, Suffolk)
- Genre: Alternative rock; electronic rock; nu metal
- Length: 46:44
- Label: SharpTone
- Producer: Jason Perry; Dan Lancaster

Don Broco chronology
Technology (2018)	Amazing Things (2021)	Live from the Royal Albert Hall (2023)

Singles from Amazing Things
- 1. "Manchester Super Reds No.1 Fan" Released: 13 May 2021; 2. "Gumshield" Released: 8 July 2021; 3. "One True Prince" Released: 6 August 2021; 4. "Uber" Released: 3 September 2021; 5. "Endorphins" Released: 15 October 2021

Amazing Things is the fourth studio album by English four-piece rock band Don Broco. It was released on 22 October 2021 through SharpTone Records. While originally slated for a 17 September 2021 release, COVID-19-related vinyl delays forced the band to reschedule the release date. The physical release on 28 January 2022 allowed the album to become the band's first UK No.1 album.

== Release ==
Don Broco began writing new material for Amazing Things in early 2020, and began recording in December 2020. After releasing a series of studio updates via YouTube the first single "Manchester Super Reds No.1 Fan" was released on Annie Mac's Future Sounds, and its accompanying music video on 13 May 2021. Announcement of the album came the following day, along with a UK headline tour in October–November 2021. The single was promoted by the band pretending their Instagram account had been hacked in the days preceding the release, posting a number of David Beckham photos. Speaking of the single, Rob Damiani said he "wanted to write something about an aspect of social media culture […] of people tearing each other down with much of that destructive negativity coming from the supposed fans of bands and teams".

The second single "Gumshield" was released on 8 July 2021, after promotion saw the band stage a boxing match with boxer Dave Allen, with the music video featuring him. Damiani said the song was "about the anxiety that comes with posting online and the fear of resulting arguments". "One True Prince" was released on 6 August 2021 as the third single, with its accompanying music video. Damiani said it was written about "finding comfort in the fact that whatever you're going through and however bad it may feel, nothing lasts forever".

Don Broco headlined the Slam Dunk Festival, in Leeds and Hatfield in September 2021, alongside a UK headline tour starting in October.

The album was released on streaming platforms on 22 October 2021, initially reaching No. 91 on the UK Album Charts. The physical release had to be delayed due to a global vinyl shortage until 28 Jan 2022. The album then went on to claim the band's first UK No.1 album the next week.

== Critical reception ==
Wall of Sound's Ebony Story scored Amazing Things 9/10 and complimented its variety of sounds revealing the "tracks that have attitude, swagger, sex appeal, cheekiness, and playfulness, and make it sound effortlessly good."

== Track listing ==
Amazing Things track listing
No.	Title	Length
1.	"Gumshield"	3:37
2.	"Manchester Super Reds No.1 Fan"	3:37
3.	"Swimwear Season"	4:38
4.	"Endorphins"	3:54
5.	"One True Prince"	3:58
6.	"Anaheim"	4:30
7.	"Uber"	3:31
8.	"How Are You Done with Existing?"	4:31
9.	"Bruce Willis"	3:16
10.	"Revenge Body"	3:46
11.	"Bad 4 Ur Health"	4:20
12.	"Easter Sunday"	3:06
Total length:		46:44

Japanese edition bonus tracks
No.	Title	Length
13.	"Action" (featuring Taka, Tyler Carter, Caleb Shomo and Tilian)	3:57
14.	"Half Man Half God"	3:10
Total length:		54:05

== Personnel ==
=== Don Broco ===
- Rob Damiani – lead vocals, electronics
- Matt Donnelly – drums, percussion, lead and backing vocals
- Simon Delaney – lead and rhythm guitars
- Tom Doyle – bass guitar, programming

=== Other personnel ===
- Jason Perry – production
- Dan Lancaster – production

== Charts ==
Chart performance for Amazing Things
Chart (2021–2022)	Peak position
Scottish Albums (OCC)	3
UK Albums (OCC)	1
UK Independent Albums (OCC)	1
UK Rock & Metal Albums (OCC)	1

== Release history ==
Region	Date	Format	Label	Ref.
Worldwide	October 22, 2021	Digital download; streaming	SharpTone	
Japan	November 24, 2021	CD	Sony Music Japan	
Worldwide	January 28, 2022	CD; vinyl; cassette	SharpTone	
