= Kerrang! Awards 2011 =

British music awards ceremony

- Sponsored by: Kerrang!
- Date: 9 June 2011
- Location: The Brewery, London
- Country: England
- Hosted by: Scott Ian; Corey Taylor

The Kerrang! Awards 2011 were held in London, England, on 9 June 2011, at The Brewery in Romford and were hosted by Slipknot singer Corey Taylor and Anthrax guitarist Scott Ian.

On 4 May 2011, Kerrang! announced the 2011 nominees. The main categories were dominated by My Chemical Romance with five nominations, Thirty Seconds to Mars with four and Avenged Sevenfold, The Blackout, Bullet for My Valentine, and Bring Me the Horizon with three apiece. Thirty Seconds to Mars was the biggest winner of the night, taking home two awards.

== Nominations ==
Winners are in bold text.

=== Best British Newcomer ===
- **Asking Alexandria**
- Blitz Kids
- The Dead Lay Waiting
- Francesqa
- Octane OK

=== Best International Newcomer ===
- **Black Veil Brides**
- Destroy Rebuild Until God Shows
- Hyro Da Hero
- The Pretty Reckless
- We Are the In Crowd

=== Best British Band ===
- The Blackout
- Bring Me the Horizon
- Bullet for My Valentine
- Enter Shikari
- **You Me at Six**

=== Best International Band ===
- **Thirty Seconds to Mars**
- All Time Low
- Avenged Sevenfold
- My Chemical Romance
- Paramore

=== Best Live ===
- Thirty Seconds to Mars
- **All Time Low**
- Avenged Sevenfold
- Bullet for My Valentine
- My Chemical Romance

=== Best album ===
- Avenged Sevenfold – Nightmare
- The Blackout – Hope
- **Bring Me the Horizon – There Is a Hell Believe Me I've Seen It. There Is a Heaven Let's Keep It a Secret.**
- Escape the Fate – Escape the Fate
- My Chemical Romance – Danger Days: The True Lives of the Fabulous Killjoys

=== Best Single ===
- **Thirty Seconds to Mars – "Hurricane"**
- Bring Me the Horizon – "Blessed with a Curse"
- Bullet for My Valentine – "Your Betrayal"
- My Chemical Romance – "Planetary (Go!)"
- Panic! at the Disco – "The Ballad of Mona Lisa"

=== Best Video ===
- Thirty Seconds to Mars – "Hurricane"
- A Day to Remember – "All I Want"
- The Blackout – "Higher & Higher"
- **My Chemical Romance – "Na Na Na (Na Na Na Na Na Na Na Na Na)"**
- Young Guns – "Stitches"

=== Classic Songwriter ===
- **Biffy Clyro**

=== Devotion Award ===
- **Skindred**

=== Kerrang! Inspiration ===
- **Def Leppard**

=== Kerrang! Icon ===
- **Alice Cooper**

=== Kerrang! Hall of Fame ===
- **Korn**

=== Kerrang! Legend ===
- **Ozzy Osbourne**
