= Good for Me (album) =

Album by The Swellers

Studio album by The Swellers
- Released: June 14, 2011
- Recorded: February 2011
- Studio: The Blasting Room, Fort Collins, Colorado
- Genre: Pop punk
- Length: 35:14
- Label: Fueled by Ramen
- Producer: Bill Stevenson, Jason Livermore

The Swellers chronology
Ups and Downsizing (2009)	Good for Me (2011)	The Light Under Closed Doors (2013)

Professional ratings
Review scores
Source	Rating
AllMusic	3/5 stars
Alternative Press	4/5 stars
Punknews.org	4/5 stars
Sputnikmusic	4/5

Good for Me is the third full-length album by Flint, Michigan's The Swellers, and second through label Fueled by Ramen.

== Background ==
In June 2010, the band began writing new material for their next album. The group began recording on February 24 with Descendents drummer Bill Stevenson as producer.

== Release ==
In March and April 2011, the group went on a UK tour alongside the Blackout and Hyro da Hero. On April 22, Good for Me was announced for release in June, revealing its artwork and track listing. In addition, "The Best I Ever Had" was made available for streaming. In April and May, the band participated in the Take Action Tour. On May 19, the group posted footage from the studio. On May 25, a music video was released for "The Best I Ever Had". On June 2, "Nothing More to Me" was made available for streaming. On June 7, Good for Me was made available for streaming via the group's Facebook profile, before being released through Fueled by Ramen on June 14. To promote its release, the group played an in-store acoustic gig. In July and August, the group went on a headlining US tour with support from Fake Problems and Daytrader. Following this, the group went on a tour of Asia with Paramore. In late September and early October, the band toured Australia as part of the Soundwave Counter-Revolution festival. In October and November, the band supported Four Year Strong on the AP Fall Tour. On November 21, Good for Me was released in the UK with bonus track "Never Greener".

In November and December, the band went on a tour of the UK and Europe with support from Broadway Calls and Into It. Over It. In January and February 2012, the group went on a co-headlining US tour with You Me at Six with support from We Are the Ocean and Twin Atlantic. In early February, the group teased a music video for "Inside My Head". On February 29, a video for "Better Things" was posted online featuring footage from the group's European tour. On April 16, the music video for "Inside My Head" was released. In April and May, the group went on a headlining tour of the UK and Europe with support from Deaf Havana. On May 26, the group appeared at Bled Fest. On May 29, a 7" vinyl was released through independent label SideOneDummy Records featuring two outtakes from the album sessions: "Vehicle City Blues" and "Red Lights". In May and June, the band went on tour with The Early November. Following this, the group performed some headlining shows in the US in June, then shows in Canada in July with Living with Lions, Such Gold and Major League. In October, the group performed at The Fest.

== Track listing ==
All songs written by Nick Diener and Jonathan Diener.

No.	Title	Length
1.	"Runaways"	2:49
2.	"Inside My Head"	3:33
3.	"The Damage"	3:11
4.	"Parkview"	3:00
5.	"The Best I Ever Had"	3:59
6.	"Better Things"	3:35
7.	"On the Line"	3:40
8.	"Nothing More to Me"	3:46
9.	"Prime Meridian"	3:49
10.	"Warming Up"	3:52

iTunes Pre-Order Bonus Tracks
No.	Title	Length
11.	"The Best I Ever Had" (Acoustic)	4:13
12.	"Inside My Head" (Acoustic)	4:10

UK Release
No.	Title	Length
11.	"Never Greener"	3:01

== Personnel ==
The Swellers

- Nick Diener – Lead vocals, guitar
- Jonathan Diener – Drums, vocals
- Ryan Collins – Guitar
- Anto Boros – Bass guitar

Artwork

- Nick Bilardello – Art Direction, Design
- Mitchell Wojcik – Photography

Management

- Kenny Czadzeck – Management
- David Galea – Booking Agent
- Katie Robinson – Marketing

Production

- Bill Stevenson – Producer, engineer
- Jason Livermore – Producer, engineer, mixing
- Ted Jensen – Mastering
- Andrew Berlin – Additional Production, engineer
- Johnny Minardi & Aryanna Platt – A&Rs

== Chart performance ==
Chart (2011)	Peak position
U.S. Billboard Heatseekers Albums	15
