= The Best in Town =

Studio album by The Blackout
- Released: 25 May 2009
- Studio: Sonic Ranch
- Genre: Post-hardcore; hard rock
- Length: 34:18
- Label: Epitaph
- Producer: Jason Perry

The Blackout chronology
We Are the Dynamite (2007)	The Best in Town (2009)	Hope (2011)

Singles from The Best in Town
- 1. "Shut-the-Fuck-Uppercut" Released: 30 March 2009; 2. "Children of the Night" Released: 18 May 2009; 3. "Save Our Selves (The Warning)" Released: 3 August 2009; 4. "I Don't Care (This Is Why We Can't Have Nice Things)" Released: 16 November 2009

Professional ratings
Aggregate scores
Source	Rating
Metacritic	54/100
Review scores
Source	Rating
AllMusic	3.5/5 stars
DIY	8/10
Kerrang!	5/5 stars
Rock Sound	8/10 stars
Planet Loud	9/10 stars
Rock Hard	7/10

The Best in Town is the second album to by Welsh rock band The Blackout.

== Background ==
In August 2008, vocalist Sean Smith said the band had written six new songs, and were aiming to record a new album later in the year. They were in the process of discussing with a few labels. Following this, the group went on a UK tour in September and October, with a handful of Christmas shows in December. They recorded at Sonic Ranch Studios in Alameda, Texas with producer Jason Perry; he and Mike Morgan served as engineers. John Mitchell mixed the album at Outhouse Studios in Reading, UK. Tom Baker mastered the album at Precisions Masters in Los Angeles, California.

== Composition ==
The title for the song "I Love Myself And I Wanna Live" is a play on the title of the Nirvana song "I Hate Myself and Want to Die". The song "Save Our Selves" came about the Blackout had an untitled song for the untitled new album in 2008. They were not happy with the way it sounded, but Producer Jason Perry thought it resembled a song of his own, which he had written with friend and former bandmate Dan P Carter, and was initially given to the band "Area" that they were both working with, it was titled "Robot". Both song ideas were put together to produce "Save Our Selves (The Warning)", which ended up being the band's most commercial single from the album.

== Release ==
On 24 February 2009, it was announced that the band had signed to independent label Epitaph Records. Smith said they picked this label as they "love[d] their ethics", as well as being fans of albums Epitaph had released. "ShutTheFuckUppercut" was first played on BBC Radio 1, where it was announced it would be released as a free download in April. This free download was actually offered for less than a week from 26 March but was released as a digital single from 30 March. "Children of the Night" was the album's lead single, and was played for the first time on Radio 1 on 13 April 2009. The music video was released on Wednesday 15 April on MTV's website. The studio recording features vocals from the Year 6 class of Herolgerrig Primary School, Merthyr Tydfil, where the band is from. In late April, the group performed at Give it a Name festival. In May, the group went on a headlining UK tour. The Best in Town was released on 25 May in Europe and 23 June in the US. The track listing for the entire album was released by the band via their Myspace blog.

On 27 May, a music video was released for "Children of the Night". Following this, the band headlined the Slam Dunk Festival, and appeared at the Download Festival. The band performed on the Kevin Says stage at Warped Tour, before headlining the Festival Republic Stage at the Reading and Leeds Festivals. The video for "This Is Why We Can't Have Nice Things (I Don't Care)" was recorded at the Islington O2 Academy on 5 September. The video features Josh Franceschi of You Me at Six, as well as members of Kids in Glass Houses and Young Guns. The video was posted online on 16 November. In January and February 2010, the band supported All Time Low on the Kerrang! tour. They played at Download Festival in June, before headlining the Rock Sound Cave stage at GuilFest in July. In December, the band supported You Me at Six on their headlining UK tour.

"Save Ourselves (The Warning)" was nominated at the Kerrang! Awards for Best Single, but lost to "Liquid Confidence" by You Me at Six. In January 2014, the group performed the album in its entirety for a one-off performance.

== Track listing ==
Track listing per sleeve.

1. "Shut-the-Fuck-Uppercut" - 3:14
2. "Save Our Selves (The Warning)" - 3:35
3. "Top of the World" - 3:28
4. "The Fire" - 3:31
5. "Children of the Night" - 2:57
6. "Said and Done" - 3:22
7. "Silent When We Speak" - 4:13
8. "I Love Myself and I Wanna Live" - 3:14
9. "This Is Why We Can't Have Nice Things" (featuring Josh Franceschi of You Me at Six) - 3:33
10. "We're Going to Hell... So Bring the Sunblock" - 3:10

== Personnel ==
Personnel per booklet.

The Blackout

- Sean Smith – vocals
- Gavin Butler – vocals
- James Davies – guitar
- Matthew Davies – guitar
- Rhys Lewis – bass
- Gareth Lawrence – drums

Additional musicians

- Josh Franceschi – additional vocals (track 9)
- Year 6 Heolgerrig Primary School – additional vocals (track 5)

Production and design

- Jason Perry – producer, engineer, mixing
- Mike Morgan – engineer
- John Mitchell – mixing
- Tom Baker – mastering
- Adam Fisher – artwork, layout
