= Start the Party (album) =

Studio album by the Blackout
- Released: 21 January 2013
- Recorded: May 2012
- Length: 37:22
- Label: Cooking Vinyl
- Producer: Jason Perry

The Blackout chronology
Hope (2011)	Start the Party (2013)

Start the Party is the fourth studio album by Welsh rock band the Blackout. It was released by Cooking Vinyl on 21 January 2013. Following the touring cycle for their third studio album, Hope (2011), the band began writing material for their next album. They recorded the album with A frontman Jason Perry acting as producer. It revolves around party-going, having received comparisons to the output of the Beastie Boys, and the guitar work of the Foo Fighters and Papa Roach.

Prior to the release of Start the Party, the Blackout embarked on a brief tour of the United Kingdom, and released music videos for "Start the Party" and "Running Scared". The album's artwork shows Dirty Sanchez' stunt performer Mathew Pritchard crowd-surfing. For promotion, the Blackout went on another headlining UK tour, a European support slot for Yellowcard, and made appearances at the Soundwave festival in Australia. Music videos for "Radio" and "Take Away the Misery" were released in mid-2013, and the Blackout embarked on a UK tour at the end of the year.

Start the Party received generally positive reviews from music critics, some of whom commented on the Blackout's musicianship. The album reached number 35 on the UK Albums Chart. "Start the Party" and "Runnin' Scared" charted at number 22 and 35, respectively, on the UK Rock & Metal Singles Chart.

== Background and production ==
Independent record label Cooking Vinyl released the Blackout's third studio album Hope, which was crowd-funded through PledgeMusic, in April 2011. While writing the album, the band had no funds, management or record label to support them. They chose to continue working with Cooking Vinyl for Start the Party, which allowed them to focus on writing rather than on business issues. The Blackout promoted Hope with two tours of the United Kingdom, and appearances at the Reading & Leeds, and Merthyr Rock festivals in late 2011. Shortly after the first promotional tour, the band started writing new material for the next album, with the rough of idea of centering it around partying. The members would work on songs in their own homes, before they get together to collaborate on them in vocalist Gavin Butler's garage in December 2011. They would do vocals at the Musicbox rehearsal space in Cardiff or in Butler's dining room.

They aimed to release another album by September or October 2012. In May 2012, the band recorded with A frontman Jason Perry, who served as producer, and engineer Michael Morgan. Vocalist Sean Smith did not want Perry; instead wanting Terry Date, who was unavailable, Eric Valentine, who was out of their budget, or John Feldmann, who was working on someone else's album. John Mitchell mixed the recordings and Tom Baker mastered them at Precision. The Blackout initially planned to feature musicians Andrew W.K. and Wes Borland of Limp Bizkit on the album. Smith said W.K. "doesn't party hard enough for The Blackout", while Borland's guitar solo was not required when the band realised they could use vocals instead.

== Composition and lyrics ==
Discussing the theme of partying, Smith said: "We just went 'What do we need right now, what does the world need?' and it's just a party album because everyone is so fucking miserable at the moment." Start the Party was compared to a hip hop-less version of the Beastie Boys, while the guitar work drew comparisons to the music of Lostprophets, Papa Roach, A, and the early work of Foo Fighters. The album has less of an emphasis on screaming than the Blackout's previous releases. The title track "Start the Party", which is also the album's opening track, is about enjoying life, and having fun. Partway through the song, the band yell out each letter of the word "party". "Radio" is about musicians stealing the songs of other artists, and passing them off as their own. "We Live On" talks about continuing through difficult times in one's life, and never giving up. Smith and Butler said "Let Me Go" is about women being angry.

"Take Away the Misery" leans toward the Blackout's hardcore punk roots with its guitar riffs, and screaming vocals. "Keep Singing" is about fighting through life, and enjoying things one likes; its melody and lyrics recall the work of Jimmy Eat World. The pop punk track "Running Scared" showcases Smith's vocal ability, and is one of Start the Party's most upbeat tracks. It is followed by the ballad "You", which is reminiscent of the works of Brand New. "Free Yourself" returns to the Lostprophets-indebted guitar riffs that can be heard throughout the album; it talks about people living their own lives, and not worrying about the lives of others. The track is followed by "Sleep When You're Dead", which has an intro that is similar to the work of AC/DC; Butler said the song is a homage to Dirty Sanchez' stunt performer Mathew Pritchard, and is named after a party boat he owned. The closing track "Throw It All Away" is about having, and maintaining a positive outlook on life.

== Release and promotion ==
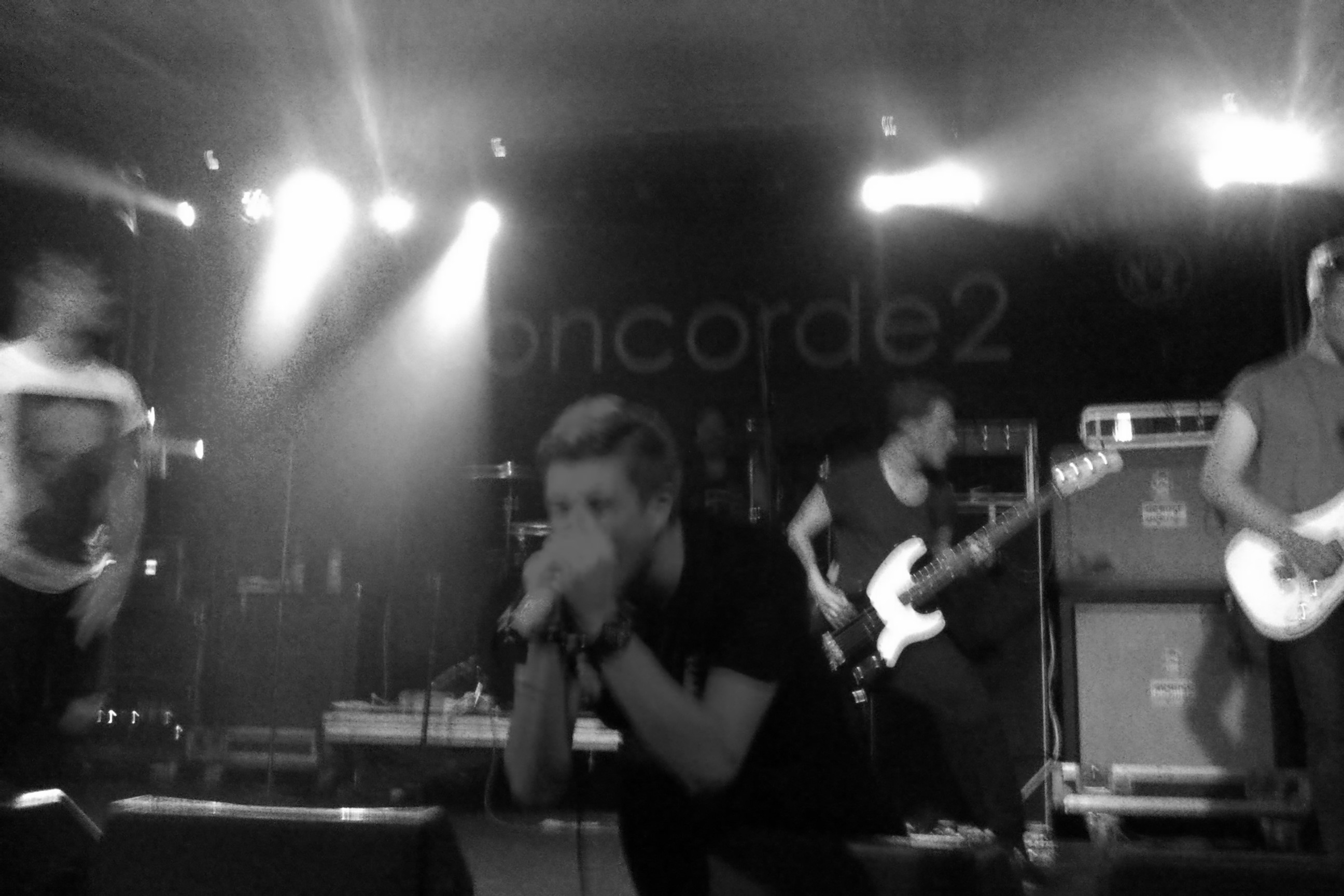
The Blackout toured throughout 2013 for Start the Party.

In August 2012, the Blackout performed at the Reading and Leeds Festivals, before headlining the Merthyr Rock Festival. On 17 September of that year, Start the Party was announced for release in January 2013. As part of the announcement, the track listing and artwork were revealed, and the music video for "Start the Party" was released. The clip was filmed in Ibiza; Pritchard organized party boats to the island, and invited the band to film there. The following day, "Start the Party" was made available for free download through the Blackout's website. The Blackout played a few shows in the UK in October 2013. The music video for "Running Scared", which was directed by Sitcom Soldiers, was released the following month. It was also filmed in Ibiza and stars Smith, who is shown travelling around trying to find his bandmates.

Start the Party was released through Cooking Vinyl on 21 January 2013; its artwork is an image of Pritchard crowd surfing. Butler said he was looking through his Instagram feed and came across a photograph of Pritchard "in a thong drinking champagne out of a bottle on a snowmobile in the middle of Norway", and felt he embodied the spirit of partying. The physical deluxe edition included a DVD on the making of the album, and live performances from the band's Reading & Leeds and Merthyr Rock appearances. The iTunes deluxe edition features covers of "Boom! Shake the Room" (1993), "Super Freak" (1981), and "Sorry for Party Rocking" (2012) as bonus tracks.

In January 2013, the Blackout went on a headlining UK tour, with support from Sonic Boom Six, and Proxies. The band planned a series of acoustic performances at HMV stores, but HMV went into administration, and the performances were later moved to selected venues on the same day. The Blackout supported Yellowcard on their European tour in January and February 2013, before touring Australia as part of the Soundwave festival. Following this, the band headlined the Radstock and Takedown festivals. A music video for "Radio" was released on 2 April 2013.

In August 2013, the Blackout performed at the Reading and Leeds Festivals. Footage from their appearance was used in the music video for "Take Away the Misery", which was released the following month. In October of that year, the band went on the Final Party tour across the UK, with support from Framing Hanley. Blitz Kids were due to support the Blackout, but were replaced by Rat Attack. The tour was scheduled to last until November 2013; however, Butler had a recurrence of a hemiplegic migraine, which resulted in the cancellation of several dates. The dates were rescheduled for January and February 2014, and had LostAlone and Rat Attack as the supporting acts.

== Reception ==
Professional ratings
Aggregate scores
Source	Rating
Metacritic	77/100
Review scores
Source	Rating
Dead Press!	5/10 stars
DIY	2.5/5 stars
Islington Gazette	3/5
The Music	5/10
musicOMH	2/5 stars
Rock Hard	7.5/10

Start the Party was met with generally favorable reviews from music critics. At Metacritic, the album received an average score of 77, based on 4 reviews.

Rock Hard editor Jens Peters noted the two vocalists "cover[ed] the entire range from nasty hardcore shouting to melodic rock" with "a knack for catchy melodies and singable hooks". Islington Gazette writer Stephen Moore found the album "a surprisingly sustained set" with its "well-used combo of pop structures, catchy melodies, [and] heart-on-sleeve lyrics". He further wrote that Butler's "accessible mid-Atlantic vocals and this clutch of fist-pumping tunes could turn The Blackout into stars". South Wales Argus reviewer Andy Howells admitted that the Blackout "get 2013 off to a cracking start with a throat blistering, mosh moving collection". Renee Jones of The Music said the band "shift away from their previous work to create a combination of catchy choruses and cheesy, fairly generic ... sounds", with every song "aiming for the obvious – a party-rock vibe". Dead Press! writer Laurence Kellett noted the "refined change", resulting in a "fine-tuned, polished album", which he said could "greatly benefit from the party rock ... attitude" of their prior material.

The Crack's RM said the Blackout come across as "the Scrappy Doo of rock: relentless and yappy with it", and added the album "sounds like The Beastie Boys ... with the hip-hop and bratty humour surgically removed". DIY contributor Greg Inglis wrote that if the band removed all of the expletives on Start the Party "then there would be more potential singles here than a David Guetta and Calvin Harris combined Greatest Hits LP". According to Inglis, the album's "crux" lies in the "many individually solid tracks that are hummable in isolation but blend into uniformity over the course of an album". Andy Baber of musicOMH found the album difficult to figure out what the band members are "doing most of the time" and said "the album just sounds like the same guitar riffs recycled, with the distortion merging them all into one." Thrash Hits writer Tom Doyle wrote it "feels like an album made by a band rehashing ideas from their youth to appeal to their indefatigable but relentlessly young fanbase." laut.de reviewer Simon Tauscher said that the album "offers what you would expect after reading the title - nothing less and nothing more", adding that there "isn't much that is new to say about it".

Start the Party reached number 35 on the UK Albums Chart. "Start the Party" charted at number 22 on the UK Rock & Metal Singles Chart, while "Runnin' Scared" reached number 35 on the chart.

== Track listing ==
Track listing per booklet. All recordings produced by Jason Perry.

Start the Party standard edition track listing
No.	Title	Length
1.	"Start the Party"	3:44
2.	"Radio"	2:58
3.	"We Live On"	3:24
4.	"Let Me Go"	3:26
5.	"Take Away the Misery"	3:09
6.	"Keep Singing"	3:24
7.	"Running Scared"	3:17
8.	"You"	3:28
9.	"Free Yourself"	3:13
10.	"Sleep When You're Dead"	3:54
11.	"Throw It All Away"	3:25

iTunes bonus tracks
No.	Title	Length
12.	"Boom! Shake the Room" (DJ Jazzy Jeff & the Fresh Prince cover)	3:30
13.	"Super Freak" (Rick James cover)	3:33
14.	"Sorry for Party Rocking" (LMFAO cover)	3:24

== Personnel ==
Personnel per booklet.

The Blackout

- Rhys Lewis – bass
- James "Bob" Davies – rhythm guitar
- Gavin Butler – vocals
- Sean Smith – vocals
- Matthew Davies – lead guitar
- Gareth "Snoz" Lawrence – drums

Production

- Jason Perry – producer
- Michael Morgan – engineer
- John Mitchell – mixing
- Tom Baker – mastering

Design

- Marcus Maschwitz – photography
- Gavin Butler – cover design
- Paul Hainsworth – artwork

== Charts ==
Chart performance for Start the Party
Chart (2013)	Peak position
UK Albums (OCC)	35
