= End of Discussion =

End of Discussion may refer to:

- "End of Discussion", a song by Rich the Kid featuring Lil Wayne, from the album The World Is Yours
- End of Discussion (album), by The Swellers
