= We Are the Dynamite =

Studio album by The Blackout
- Released: 1 October 2007
- Studio: Long Wave Studio, South Wales
- Genre: Emo; post-hardcore
- Length: 38:35
- Label: Fierce Panda
- Producer: Romesh Dodangoda

The Blackout chronology
| The Blackout! The Blackout! The Blackout! (2006) | We Are the Dynamite (2007) | The Best in Town (2009) |

Singles from We Are the Dynamite
- 1. "The Beijing Cocktail" Released: 24 September 2007; 2. "It's High Tide Baby!" Released: 25 February 2008

Professional ratings
Review scores
| Source | Rating |
|---|---|
| AllMusic | 3/5 stars |
| Kerrang! | 3/5 stars |
| Rock Hard | 6/10 |

We Are the Dynamite is the debut studio album by the Welsh rock band the Blackout, released on 1 October 2007 by Fierce Panda Records, their final release on the label. The album sold 12,000 copies in its first week of release. The singles released from the album were "The Beijing Cocktail" and "It's High Tide Baby!", with the latter single featuring guest vocals from Ian Watkins of Lostprophets.

== Track listing ==
1. "Tick Tick Boom!!" – 1:26
2. "I've Got Better Things to Do Tonight Than Die" – 3:29
3. "I Know You Are, But What Am I?" – 3:29
4. "Spread Legs, Not Lies" – 3:50
5. "The Beijing Cocktail" – 3:43
6. "Murder in the Make-Believe Ballroom" – 3:19
7. "Prepare for a Wound" – 3:43
8. "It's High Tide Baby!" (featuring Ian Watkins) – 3:45
9. "Tops Off Party!" – 4:01
10. "She Is Macho" – 3:28
11. "Life & Death in Space" – 4:21

== Personnel ==
Personnel per booklet.

The Blackout

- Sean Smith – vocals
- Gavin Butler – vocals
- James Davies – guitar
- Matthew Davies – guitar
- Rhys Lewis – bass
- Gareth Lawrence – drums

Additional musicians

- Romesh Dodangoda – string arrangement, drum programming, percussion
- Christiana Mavron – violin
- Rebekah Brown – viola
- Emma Bryden – cello
- Ian Watkins – guest vocals

Production and design

- Romesh Dodangoda – producer, engineer, mixing, mastering
- Chris McFall – art, design, photography
