= My Everest =

Studio album by The Swellers
- Released: June 4, 2007
- Genre: Punk rock
- Length: 37:36
- Label: Search and Rescue

The Swellers chronology
Beginning of the End Again (2005)	My Everest (2007)	Ups and Downsizing (2009)

Professional ratings
Review scores
Source	Rating
AllMusic	3.5/5 stars
Alternative Press	3/5 stars
Punknews.org	4/5 stars

My Everest is the debut studio album on Search and Rescue Records, from the Flint, Michigan based punk rock band, The Swellers.

== Background ==
In September and October 2006, the band embarked on a tour of the US with Bensin. Following this, they went on a short tour of Japan.

== Release ==
In January and February 2007, the Swellers went on an East Coast tour; Bensin and Giving Chase appeared on select dates. In March and April 2007, they toured across the US with labelmates Alucard, leading up to an appearance at the Bowling Green Music Festival. On May 1, 2007, My Everest was announced for release the following month. "Bottles", "The Flood", and "This Is My Everest" were posted on the band's Myspace profile. My Everest was released on June 4, 2007; it was promoted with a five-week US tour in June and July with Alucard, which was followed by a West Coast tour in August and September. In October, the group went on a US tour with Only Crime and A Wilhelm Scream, including an appearance at The Fest. On November 5, a music video for "Bottles" premiered via Alternative Press, directed by Mike Berlucchi. An acoustic version of "By a Thread" was posted on Myspace the following month. In January 2008, the band embarked on a headlining tour of the US, with support from Fireworks and Sydney. Between late March and mid-May 2008, the band toured across the US, often performing one-off shows with a number of bands. Prior to this trek, bassist Lance Nelson left to form Deadtown. Preceded by a few US shows with Less Than Jake, the Swellers went on a tour of Canada with the Artist Life and then a US tour with A Wilhelm Scream. In August, the band went on a tour of Canada with Polar Bear Club. In October 2008, the band played a handful of US shows with Streetlight Manifesto and the A.K.A.s, and appeared at The Fest. In January and February 2009, the band supported Streetlight Manifesto on their headlining tour of the US.

== Track listing ==
All songs written by Nick and Jonathan Diener.

1. "Vehicle City" – 2:44
2. "Bottles" – 3:08
3. "The Flood" – 2:44
4. "This Is My Everest" – 3:44
5. "Clean Slate" – 3:18
6. "Surrounded" – 2:40
7. "What's at Stake" – 2:43
8. "Rain Check" – 3:37
9. "Keep Looking Where Your Eyes Are Looking Now" – 2:01
10. "Skoots" – 3:42
11. "Conscience, Meet Common Sense" – 1:53
12. "The Way Back Home" – 5:22
13. "By A Thread (Acoustic)" (Japanese Bonus Track) – 4:28

== Personnel ==
- Nick Diener - guitar, lead vocals
- Garrett Burgett - guitar
- Lance Nelson - bass
- Jonathan Diener - drums, vocals
