= The Light Under Closed Doors =

Studio album by The Swellers
- Released: October 29, 2013
- Recorded: April 2013
- Genre: Pop punk
- Length: 29:35
- Label: No Sleep

The Swellers chronology
Good for Me (2011)	The Light Under Closed Doors (2013)

The Light Under Closed Doors is the fourth and final studio album by American rock band The Swellers. The album charted at number 10 on Billboard's Vinyl Albums chart.

== Background ==
On April 8, 2013, the band announced they were recording their next album. On May 21, the band posted they were in the mixing process.

== Release ==
On May 24, 2013, the band announced they had signed to independent label No Sleep Records. In June and July, the group went on Warped Tour. On August 6, The Light Under Closed Doors was announced for release in October, revealing its track listing and artwork. In addition, "Should" was made available for streaming via MTV. On August 23, "Becoming Self-Aware" was made available for streaming. On September 27, a music video was released for "High/Low". On October 1, "Big Hearts" was made available for streaming via Alternative Press. In October and November, the group embarked on US tour that visited house parties, pizza parlors and skate rinks, among other venues. The Light Under Closed Doors was released on October 29. On December 4, a music video for "Got Social" was premiered on MTVu. In March, the group supported I Am the Avalanche on their headlining US tour. Following this, the group embarked on a UK tour in April and May.

== Reception ==
Professional ratings
Review scores
Source	Rating
Alternative Press	4/5 stars
Blare	8.4/10
idobi	4/5
KCOU	9/10
Kill Your Stereo	65/100
Punknews.org	4/5 stars
Substream Magazine	(favorable)

The album received positive reviews from critics. It charted at number 10 on the Vinyl Albums chart and number 15 on the Heatseekers Albums chart.

== Track listing ==
1. "Should" – 2:05
2. "Big Hearts" – 3:15
3. "Got Social" – 2:51
4. "High/Low" – 2:24
5. "Great Lakes State" – 3:21
6. "Becoming Self-Aware" – 3:20
7. "Friends Again (We Can't Be)" – 2:31
8. "Designated Driver" – 3:27
9. "Favorite Tune" – 2:28
10. "Call It a Night" – 3:53

== Charts ==
Chart (2013)	Peak position
US Heatseekers Albums (Billboard)	15
US Vinyl Albums (Billboard)	10
