= Minimum Serious =

French pop punk band

- Origin: Grenoble, France
- Genres: Pop punk
- Years active: 2000 - present
- Labels: Mercury Records
- Members: Ced D. (Vocals/Guitar); Fritz (Bass); The Guish (Guitar); Mister Barbecue (Drums/Backing Vocals)

Minimum Serious is a pop punk band that formed in 2000 in Grenoble, France. Their lyrics are in French and English.

== History ==
Minimum Serious has released two albums, "Fantastic World" in 2000 and "Procapitalist" in 2002, through their own record label, On The Ring Records.

After their French tour with bands like Sum 41, Lagwagon, and Mad Caddies, the band decided to send their press kit to record labels. Mercury Records offered them a contract and sent the band to record a new album with producer David Salsedo and engineer Clive Martin. This resulted in their self-titled third album.

At the end of 2005, after one year of touring in France, Minimum Serious recorded another album, Goodbye California with the single "Goodbye California" that went to number 24 on the French charts. To promote the new album, the band went on a French tour for one year and played at the Give It A Name festival of 2007 in France with bands like New Found Glory, The Used, and Saosin.

The band's fifth album, (R)evolution, was released in 2008.

== Discography ==
=== Albums ===
Year	Title	Label	French chart
2000	Fantastic World	On The Ring Records	
2002	Procapitalist	On The Ring Records	
2004	Minimum Serious	Mercury Records	#64
2006	Goodbye California	Mercury Records	#27
2008	(R)evolution	Mercury Records	

=== EPs ===
Year	Title	Label
2000	Mysterio En La Bermuda	On The Ring Records

=== Singles ===
Year	Title	Chart positions	Album
Year	Title	French chart	Album
2004	"Ça Commence A Se Savoir"	-	Minimum Serious
2006	"Goodbye California"	#24	Goodbye California
2007	"Si Demain..."	-	Goodbye California
