= Proxies (band) =

British alternative rock band

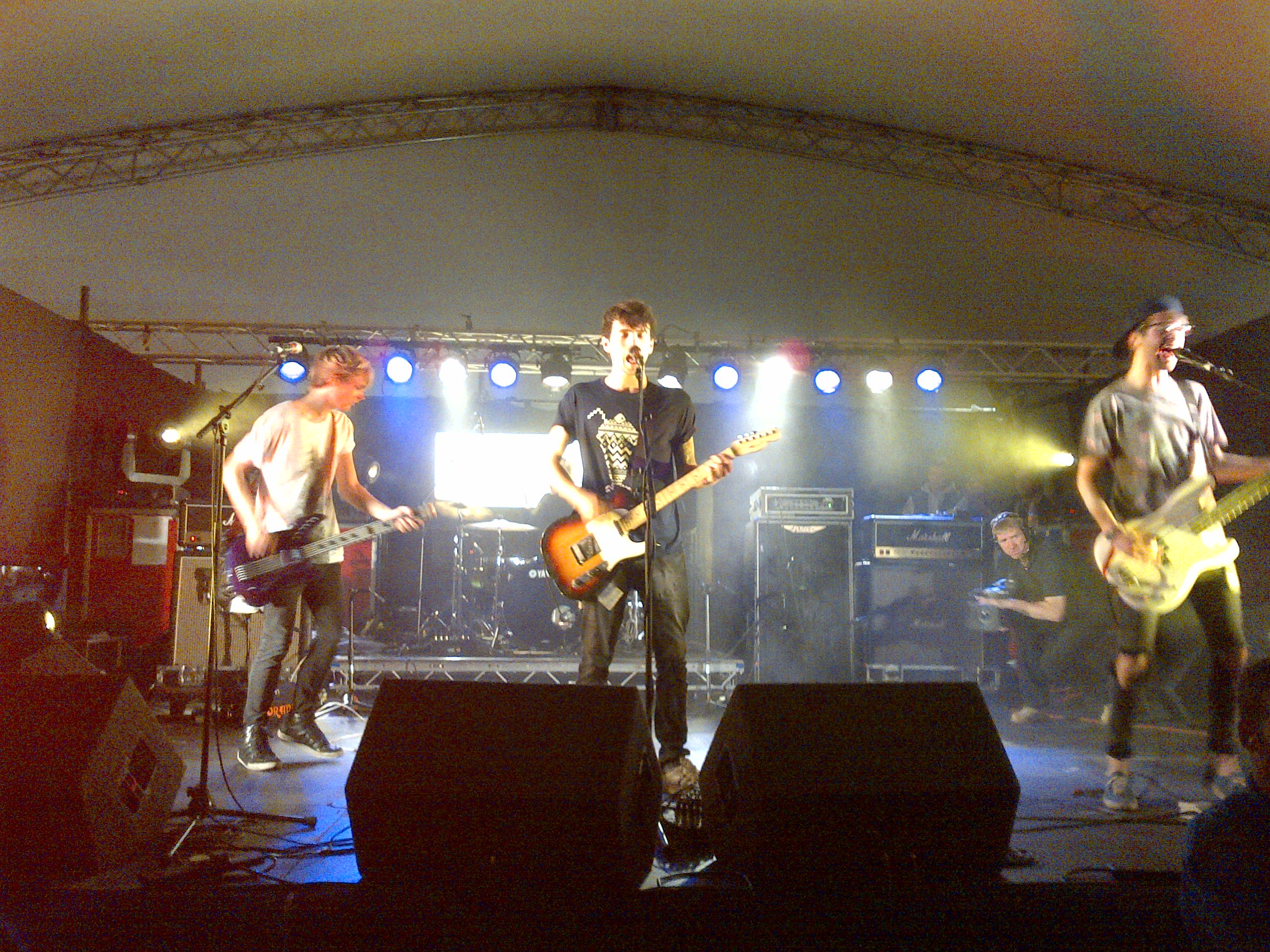
- Proxies at Reading Festival in August 2012.

Background information
- Origin: Yorkshire, England
- Genres: Alternative rock; electronica
- Years active: 2010–2013
- Label: Unsigned
- Members: Joseph Todd; Jordan Fish; Alex James Binnington; Greg T Brown; Alex James Partington
- Past members: Joshua Rumble
- Website: proxiesmusic.com

Proxies were a British alternative rock band that combined many styles of rock and electronica, founded in Yorkshire, England in 2010.

== History ==
=== Formation (2010) ===
Proxies was founded in the summer of 2010 by songwriters Jordan Fish and Joseph Todd, initially under the name Loki. When Loki began to gain attention quickly through the use of social media platforms such as Twitter, Tumblr and Facebook, Fish they announced that they had changed the name of the band to Proxies and simultaneously released all the demo tracks the band had previously recorded in the form of free downloads. Proxies collaborated with musician/hacker YTCracker for their first demo under the new alias, in which ytcracker references the name change.

=== New members (2011–present) ===
In autumn 2010, it was revealed that Jordan's childhood friend, and drummer, Alex Binnington, had joined the band and Proxies performed their live debut as guests for select dates on English rock band Canterbury's tour, followed up by acting as direct support for Hadouken!'s concerts scheduled between the band's dates on Pendulum's Immersion Tour. The band have continued to use social media outlets to promote themselves, and have garnered a considerable following online, particularly through Fish's Twitter account, which was often used to make free downloads directly available, bypassing conventional methods.

On 2 May 2011, Proxies debuted their current line-up with a live bassist at London's Monto Water Rats venue while performing as direct support for Patrick Stump. On 22 May, it was announced that Joshua Rumble had joined as a permanent member of the band.

The band's first single, "If I Had A Penny To My Name", featuring vocals from friend of the band Sean Smith of The Blackout, was debuted on BBC Introducing Humberside on 13 November 2011. Shortly afterwards, a video compiled from footage videographer Jordan Green filmed while spending ten days with the band, including clips of the band playing live, behind-the-scenes studio footage of recording the track with Sean Smith and Gareth McGrillen, and also brief clips of Fish with British singer-songwriter Ed Sheeran, was released as the official video for the single.

It was announced that "If I Had A Penny To My Name" would be playlisted on BBC Radio 1 as part of the BBC Introducing program. It was to receive its debut national airplay on Fearne Cotton's radio show on 19 March 2012, the same day that the track will be released for purchase; however the same day's show included a special Live Lounge for pop singer Katy Perry which overran until the end of the show, causing Proxies debut to be rescheduled. The track was finally debuted on Scott Mills' Radio 1 show on 20 March 2012.

From 9 May 2013 the band appear to have split up. They shut down their various social media outlets and website and signed off cryptically via their Twitter.

However, another band page at stopdreaming.co.uk appeared soon after this, with the linked Stop Dreaming Facebook page indicating Jordan Fish, Alex Partington, and Joe Todd as band members. There have also been numerous tracks on SoundCloud that hint towards the bands, a track called "Chimera (Demo)" released in June 2014 by user joerobot tagged with "#proxies", whilst three new tracks with Stop Dreaming artwork have been posted under a collection titled "whatever, forever" in 2013 by user jmfish.

== Live performances ==
Proxies have toured and performed with the likes of Kids in Glass Houses, Patrick Stump, Hadouken!, The Blackout and Metronomy as well as performing a series of headline shows in summer 2012. In February 2012, Proxies also performed as part of HMV's Next Big Thing.

In April 2012, NME magazine announced that Proxies would play Club NME at London's Koko in June.

Proxies joined the festival circuit in 2012, completing a series of festivals around the UK, including Reading and Leeds Festival, Boardmasters, Redfest, Y Not Festival, Merthyr Rock, Underground Festival and Takedown Festival.

== Band members ==
- Joseph Todd – vocals, guitar (2010–present)
- Jordan Fish – ztar, electronics, keyboards, synthesizers, vocals, bass guitar (2010–present)
- Alex James Binnington – drums, programming, electronics (2010–present)
- Greg T Brown – keyboard (2012–present)
- Alex James Partington – vocals, guitar (2012–present)

== Discography ==
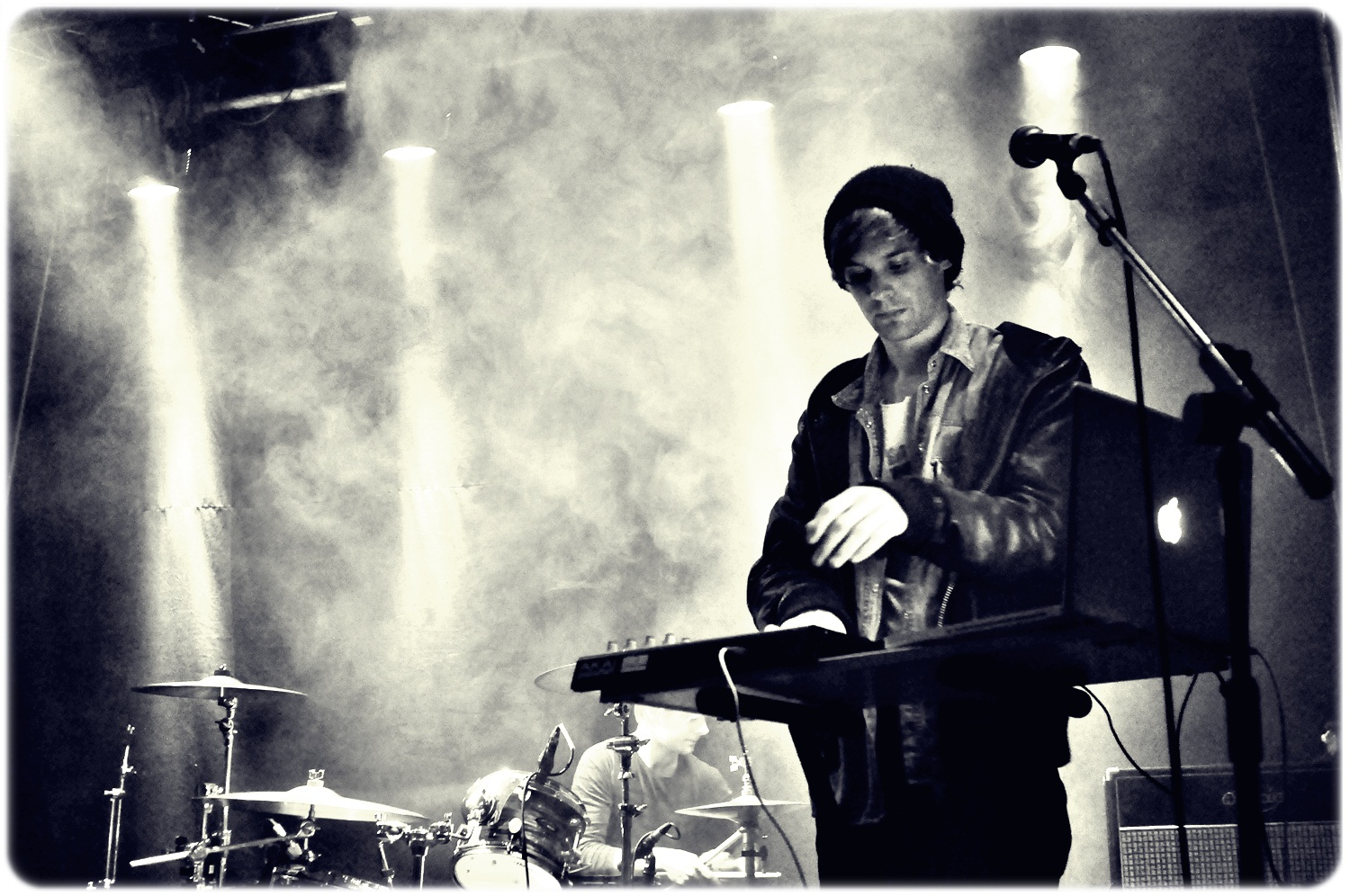
Proxies headlining Newcastle's O2 Academy in 2010.

=== EPs ===
Year	Album	
Year	Album	Release date
2012	Lost Tapes Vol. 1	21 June 2012
2012	Lost Tapes Vol. 2	6 September 2012

=== Singles ===
Year	Title	Label	
Year	Title	Label	Release date
2012	"If I Had A Penny To My Name (ft. Sean Smith)"	Theia Mania Recordings	19 March 2012
2012	"Trojan (Inside Your Chest)"	Theia Mania Recordings	9 May 2012
2012	"Guillotine"	Theia Mania Recordings	TBA

=== Proxies Remixed ===
- "If I Had A Penny To My Name (ft. Sean Smith)" – Eyes Remix
- "If I Had A Penny To My Name (ft. Sean Smith)" – Preyfour Remix

=== Proxies Remixes ===
- The Blackout – Start The Party (Proxies Remix)
- Canterbury – Ready Yet (Proxies Remix)
- Pegasus Bridge – Heartstrings (Proxies Farewell Remix)

=== Other songs ===
- "Jesus Christ ft. Laura Hayden" (Brand New cover) for Proxies 'In Session' featuring singer/model Laura Hayden, released as a free download.
- "Arc Of Time" – (Bright Eyes cover) for Proxies 'In Session', released as a free download.
- "Baby Blackout" (Black Cards cover) released as a free acoustic session download.
- "Vampire Smile" – (Kyla La Grange cover) for Proxies 'In Session', released as a free download.
- "Maps" (Yeah Yeah Yeahs cover) for Proxies 'In Session' release as a free download for Valentines 2013.
- "Teenage Dream" (Katy Perry cover) leaked as a secret download on April Fools' Day 2011.
- "Tonight In Red and White" (Demo) released as a free demo download.
- "Strange Times (You & I)" (Demo) released as a free demo download.
- "Game/Winner" (Demo) released as a free demo download.
- "Everytime 1989" (Demo) released as a free demo download.

=== Videography ===
- If I Had A Penny to my Name (ft. Sean Smith)
- Jesus Christ (ft. Laura Hayden) – (Brand New cover)
- Arc Of Time – (Bright Eyes cover)
- Trojan (Inside Your Chest)
- Vampire Smile – (Kyla La Grange cover)
- Maps – (Yeah Yeah Yeahs cover)
