= The Swellers =

American punk band

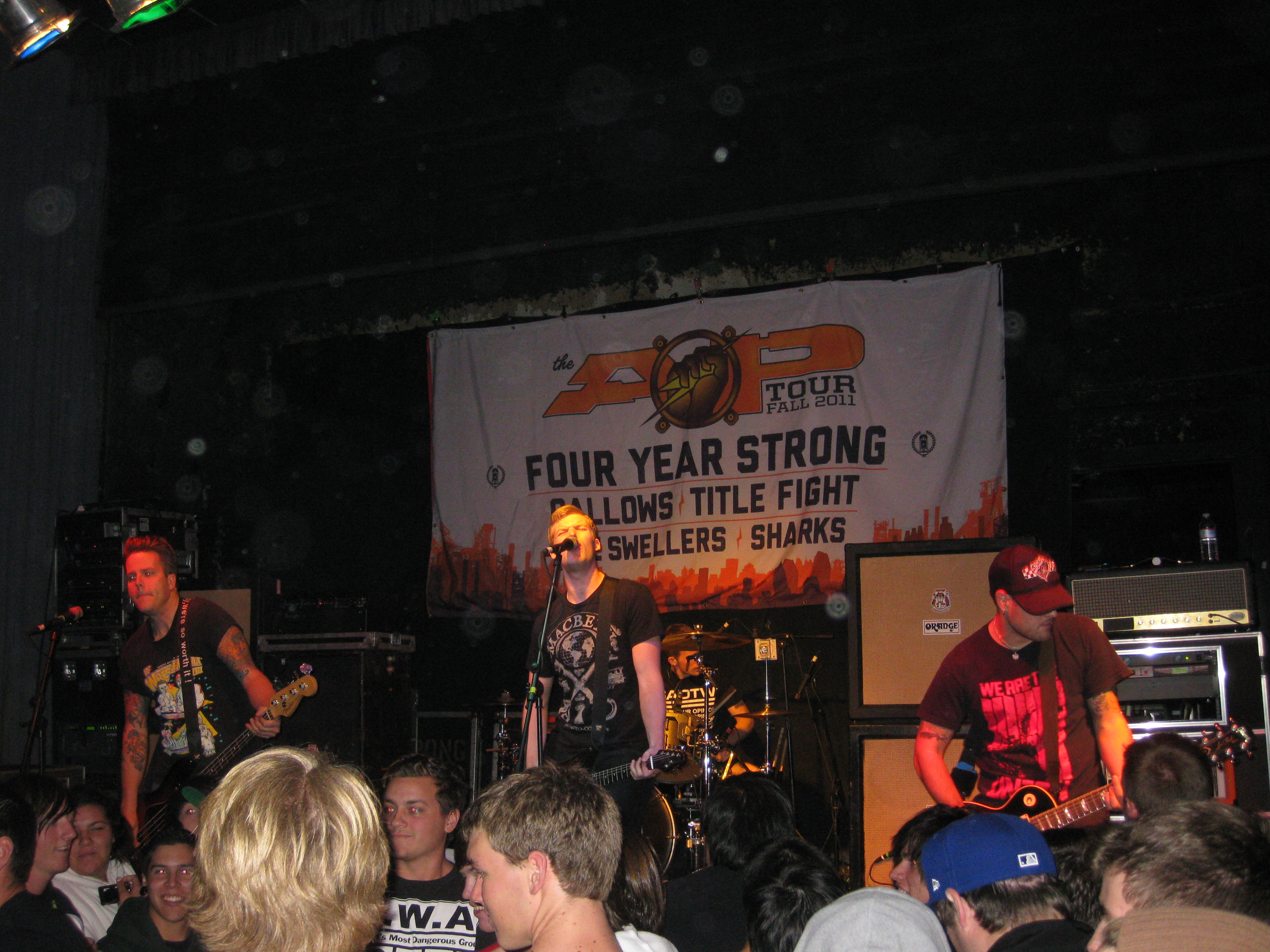
- Left to right: Boros, Nick Diener, Jonathan Diener, and Collins in 2011

Background information
- Origin: Flint, Michigan
- Genres: Punk rock, pop punk, melodic hardcore
- Years active: 2002–2015
- Labels: Fueled by Ramen, Paper + Plastick, Search and Rescue, Radtone, No Sleep
- Past members: Nick Diener; Jonathan Diener; Ryan Collins; Anto Boros; Garrett Burgett; Lance Nelson; Nate Lamberts; Brad Linden

The Swellers were an American punk band from Flint, Michigan. Their music is influenced by melodic punk rock, as well as alternative and indie rock bands, from the 1990s. They disbanded in 2015.

== Band history ==
On June 24, 2002, brothers Nick and Jonathan Diener brought their friend Nate Lamberts from Grand Rapids to Fenton, Michigan to jam. In the following days, they formed The Swellers and recorded a 3-song demo.

After a week, the band booked its first show at the Flint Local 432 in Flint, Michigan, opening for the band Divit.

After a few years of playing shows across Michigan and the Midwest, Lamberts left to pursue a college education. Garrett Burgett and Lance Nelson, close friends and fellow members of the Flint music scene, joined soon after on bass and guitar.

The band recorded their debut EP Beginning Of The End Again in the spring of 2005 at Sentient Studios in Flint, MI. That summer, the band signed to Search and Rescue Records and played a Midwestern/Canadian leg of the Vans Warped Tour.

In June and July 2006, the band embarked on a tour of the US. Since the summer of 2006, The Swellers has been constantly touring the US. That same year, they signed to the Japanese label Radtone Music and flew out to perform a week of shows.

In November and December 2006, The Swellers went to the newly moved Sentient Studio in Chicago to record their full-length album, My Everest. The album was released on June 5, 2007, through Search and Rescue Records.

From March to May 2008, Lance and Garrett left the group before several large tours. The Swellers enlisted Ryan Collins, the guitarist of the fellow labelmates and now defunct act, Alucard (whose other guitarist, Mike Supina, had recently joined A Wilhelm Scream). Close friends Brad Linden and Ben Wixson fulfilled bass duties for several months.

On August 25, 2008, the band released a 15-track album of "personalized" songs via PureVolume.

Second guitar player Ryan Collins joined the band before the recording of the album Ups and Downsizing, and soon after, bassist Anto Boros, previously of the Canadian band Sydney, joined The Swellers to round out the new lineup.

Ups and Downsizing, their Fueled By Ramen debut, was recorded at Drasik Studios in Chicago by Mark Michalik and was released on September 29, 2009. In support of the album, The Swellers toured as an opening act for Paramore's Brand New Eyes World Tour, which began on September 29, 2009.

The Swellers was an opening act for Less Than Jake on their Winter United States tour, along with the street punk band The Casualties. Throughout early 2010, The Swellers went on tour with Motion City Soundtrack for their My Dinosaur Life Tour.

The Swellers journeyed to Europe for the first time in 2010, playing the Give It A Name Festival in several countries and Groezrock in Belgium. They headlined the Give It A Name Introduces Tour in the UK with Anarbor and The Dangerous Summer.

From June 25 to July 17, 2010, The Swellers played Vans Warped Tour for the second time on the Ernie Ball Stage.

In March, the band was named one of Shred News's "Artists to watch in 2010".

The band supported Anti-Flag in October on the Vans Off The Wall Tour in Europe, flew home to play The Fest 9 in Gainesville, Florida, with The Suicide Machines, Strike Anywhere, and A Wilhelm Scream. One month later, the band went back overseas to support Young Guns.

In April 2011, The Swellers supported The Blackout on their UK & Ireland tour for their third studio album Hope. In that same year, The Swellers joined Bayside, Silverstein, Polar Bear Club and Texas in July on the Take Action Tour.

It was announced April 22, 2011, through Alternative Press that their new album, titled Good For Me, would be released on June 14, where one of the new tracks called "Best I Ever Had" could be streamed.

In April 2012, they announced their departure from the Fueled by Ramen label. They released a 7" (Vehicle City Blues) on Side One Dummy Records.

On October 16, The Swellers self-released an EP entitled Running Out Of Places To Go. It is composed of five songs that the band recorded and produced independently.

The Swellers signed to No Sleep Records in May 2013 and announced in August 2013 that they would be releasing their 4th full-length, The Light Under Closed Doors, on October 29.

On April 15, 2014, The Swellers announced via Facebook their release of "B-sides and Rarities."

On June 24, 2014, they announced via Facebook and Twitter that they would be breaking up and booking farewell shows.

In February and March 2015, the band performed at Soundwave. On May 1, 2015, they played their last show at Groezrock.

In May 2024, The Swellers released a compilation album on all streaming platforms called B-sides and Rarities. The reimagined compilation album included b-side tracks from Good For Me, Ups and Downsizing, Vehicle City Blues, Running Out Of Places To Go, Montreal Screwjob, and their full acoustic catalog.

== Band members ==
Final line-up

- Nick Diener — guitar and lead vocals (2002–2015)
- Jonathan Diener — drums and backing vocals (2002–2015)
- Ryan Collins — guitar (2008–2015)
- Anto Boros — bass and backing vocals (2009–2015)

Former members

- Garrett Burgett — guitar (2004–2008)
- Nate Lamberts — bass (2002–2005)
- Lance Nelson — bass (2005–2008)
- Brad Linden — bass (2008–2009)

Touring musicians

- Ben Wixson — bass (2008)

Timeline

== Discography ==
=== Albums ===
- End of Discussion — Self-Released: December 3, 2003
- My Everest — Released: March 19, 2007 on Search and Rescue Records and Radtone Music in Japan
- Ups and Downsizing — Released: September 29, 2009 on Fueled By Ramen
- Good for Me — Released: June 14, 2011 on Fueled By Ramen
- The Light Under Closed Doors — Released: October 29, 2013 on No Sleep Records

=== 7" ===
- Welcome Back Riders — 7" Vinyl Released July 28, 2009 on Fueled By Ramen and Paper + Plastick
- Vehicle City Blues — 7" Vinyl Released May 29, 2012 on Side One Dummy

=== EPs ===
- Beginning of the End Again — Released: August 11, 2005 on Search and Rescue Records
- Running Out Of Places To Go — Self-Released: October 16, 2012

=== Demos ===
- Long and Hard Self-Released (2002)

=== Compilations ===
- First Taste Of The Morning (2005) TDR
- Pop Punk Loves You 3 (2007) Wynonna Records
- Everyone Living Under A Gun (2008) The Political Party Records
- Rock Against Malaria (2009) Eunuch Records
- Take Action! Vol 9. (2010) Sub City Records
- No Sleep 'Till Christmas 3 (2010) No Sleep Records
- Warped Tour 2010 Tour Compilation (2010) Side One Dummy Records
- Take Action! Vol 10. (2011) Sub City Records
- B-sides and Rarities (2014)
- Not Safe To Drink: Music For Flint Water Crisis Relief (2016)
- B-sides and Rarities (Re-imagined) (2024)

=== Music Videos ===
- "Tunnel Vision" (2006)
- "Bottles" (2007)
- "Fire Away" (2009)
- "Sleeper" (2010)
- "The Best I Ever Had" (2011)
- "Inside My Head" (2012)
- "Hands" (2012)
- "Running Out of Places to Go" (2013)
- "Should" (2013)
- "High/Low" (2013)
- "Got Social" (2013)
