= Ups and Downsizing =

Studio album by the Swellers
- Released: September 29, 2009
- Recorded: January 2009
- Studio: 37, Rochester, Michigan; Allure Sound Oak Park, Michigan; Artisan Sounds, Chicago, Illinois; Drasik, Chicago, Illinois
- Genre: Melodic hardcore, punk rock, pop-punk, scene music
- Length: 39:15
- Label: Fueled by Ramen
- Producer: The Swellers; Mark Michalik

The Swellers chronology
My Everest (2007)	Ups and Downsizing (2009)	Good for Me (2011)

Singles from Ups and Downsizing
- 1. "Welcome Back Riders" Released: July 28, 2009

Ups and Downsizing is the second studio album by American rock band the Swellers, released on September 29, 2009 through Fueled by Ramen. After touring in support of their previous album My Everest (2007), the band went through line-up changes from early-to-mid 2008. After a short tour across the US at the end of the year, they recorded their next album at studios in Michigan and Illinois with them producing the sessions alongside Mark Michalik. Ups and Downsizing is a melodic hardcore and punk rock album that was compared to the work of No Use for a Name, Pulley and Ten Foot Pole.

Ups and Downsizing received generally favourable reviews from music critics, many of whom praised the album's musicianship and songwriting quality. After recording, Anto Boros became the Swellers' new bassist. Leading up to the album's release, they supported Set Your Goals and Four Year Strong on their co-headlining US tour. They promoted it with support slots for Paramore, Less Than Jake and Motion City Soundtrack. The Swellers went on their debut UK tour in early 2010, which was followed by a short tour with Crime in Stereo and a stint on that year's Warped Tour. They ended the year supporting Fireworks on their three-month long US tour.

== Background and recording ==
The Swellers released My Everest in June 2007; they promoted it with a tour of the United States with Alucard and then went on their own West Coast tour shortly afterwards. They ended the year with a US tour with Only Crime and A Wilhelm Scream. In early 2008, the Swellers embarked on headlining US tour, with support from Fireworks and Sydney. In March 2008, guitarist Garrett Burgett announced his departure from the band, though stayed for another two months; when bassist Lance Nelson heard about this, he left immediately. Ryan Collins of Alucard initially took over Nelson's role and then eventually Burgett's.

By June 2008, friend of the band Brad Linden dropped out of college to join them as their bassist. They went on a short US tour with Polar Bear Club and Fireworks in December 2008. Ups and Downsizing was recorded in January 2009, with upwards of 14 songs being recorded for inclusion. Sessions were held at 37 Studios in Rochester, Michigan, Allure Sound in Oak Park, Michigan, Artisan Sounds in Chicago, Illinois and Drasik Studios, also in Chicago. The band and Mark Michalik served as producers, with the latter also acting as engineer. Coinciding with this, they posted videos from the process on their Myspace profile. Ted Jensen then mastered the album at Sterling Sound in New York City.

== Composition and lyrics ==
Musically, the sound of Ups and Downsizing has been described as melodicore and punk rock, drawing comparison to the work of Alkaline Trio, No Use for a Name circa More Betterness! (1999), Pulley and Ten Foot Pole. Discussing the album, Nick Diener said it meshed together "all of our influences that we've wanted to put into our music", going on to single out writing in different time signatures or adding an acoustic song. Jonathan Diener said they wanted to include more of their influences such as Jimmy Eat World, Nada Surf, Saves the Day and Weezer, while at the same time listening to other acts like Oceansize. Nick Diener's voice recalled that of Tim Pagnotta of Sugarcult and Tyson Ritter from the All-American Rejects.

Jonathan Diener said the band had begun writing material for Ups and Downsizing as soon as My Everest was released as they had leftover ideas from that album. Discussing the title, Jonathan Diener explained that he and his brother had lived in Fenton, Michigan for around eight years, where they noticed that "everyone's parents work for [General Motors], and most of them have gotten laid off at some point". He added that he liked the line "Strikes and gutters. Ups and downs" from The Big Lebowski (1998) and wanted to pay homage to that. AbsolutePunk staff writer Thomas Nassiff said a recurring them throughout the album was "being free, being your own person, and doing it yourself".

Throughout the recordings, Eric Hausser, Sal Panza, Brian Phee and Jared Rohde contributed additional vocals. The album's opening track, "2009", merges the band's various influences, and has a 1990s-esque alternative chorus section. "Sleeper" and "Do You Feel Better Yet?" both recall the sound of Piebald circa We Are the Only Friends We Have (2002). The latter song is an acoustic track, enhanced by feedback. "Welcome Back Riders" talks about the Cedar Point amusement park. Both "Feet First" and "Watch It Go" showcase the band's forte for melody and catchy vocal harmonies. "Ups and Downsizing" tackles an economic crisis that affected many families. Nassiff said "The Iron" had a "do or die mentality" that recalled Rise Against frontman Tim McIlrath. The acoustic song "Stars" precedes the album's closing track, "Dirt", which discusses death.

== Release ==
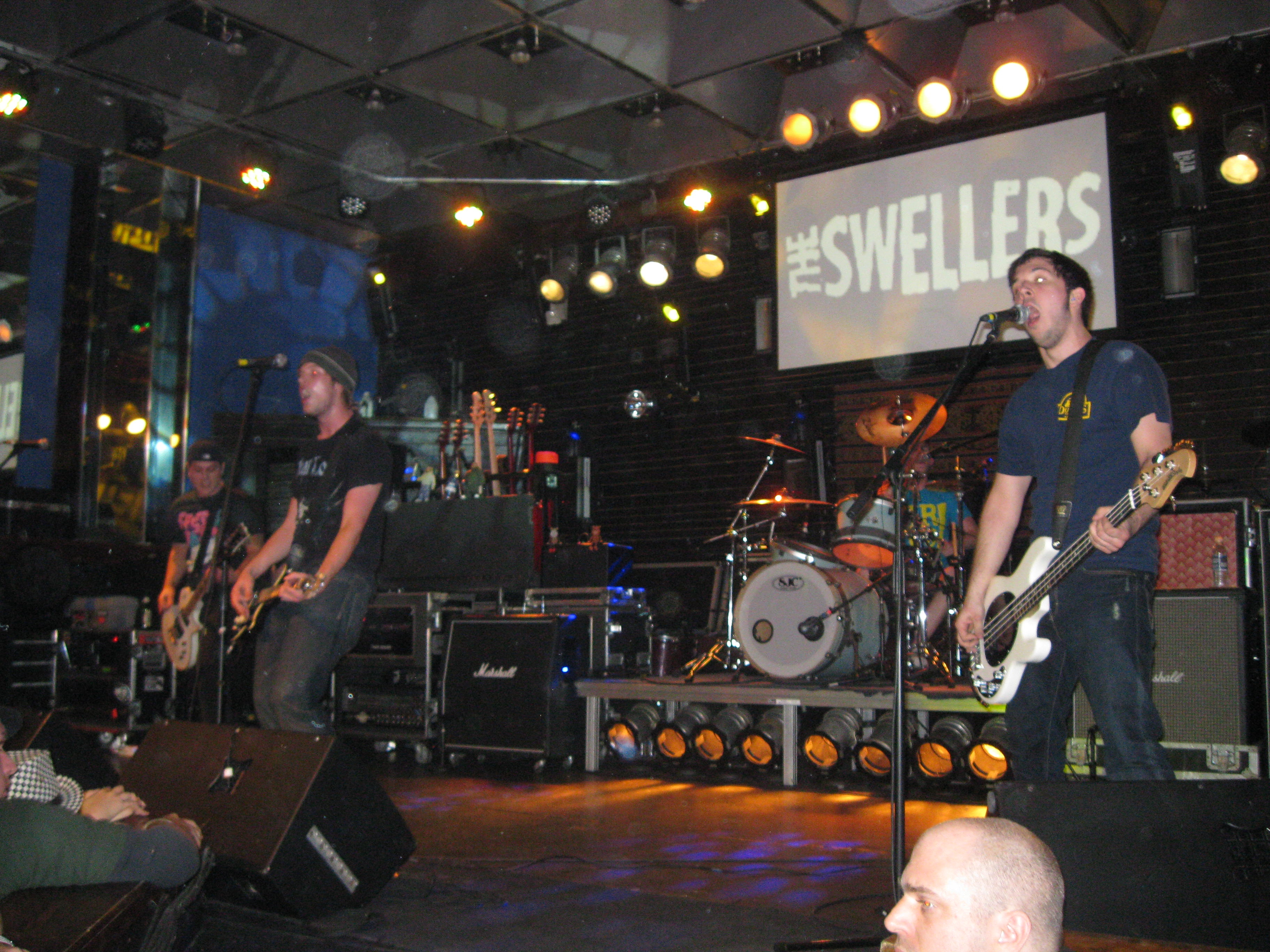
The Swellers performing live in 2009.

In January and February 2009, the band supported Streetlight Manifesto on their headlining tour of the US. In April 2009, the band performed a handful of shows with This Time Next Year. Around this time, Anto Boros became the band's bassist. In June and July 2009, they went on a West Coast tour with Living with Lions. In the midst of this, the band announced that they had signed to Fueled by Ramen on July 1, 2009. Nick Diener said they had been talking to the label for several months; they found out that the staff members were fans of 1990s punk rock bands such as the Get Up Kids and Hot Water Music. He also said that the label's artists and repertoire representative, who heard the band's demos, was childhood friends with the Dieners' cousin. Alongside the announcement, "Welcome Back Riders" was posted on the band's Myspace profile. For the rest of July 2009, the band supported Set Your Goals and Four Year Strong on their co-headlining US tour.

"Welcome Back Riders" was released as a single on July 28, 2009, with the outtake "Montreal Screwjob" as its B-side, as a joint release between Fueled by Ramen and Paper + Plastick. The band approached Paper + Plastick as they were long-time friends of founder Vinnie Fiorello, as well as being fans of his band Less Than Jake. On August 5, 2009, Ups and Downsizing was announced for release the following month. On August 18, 2009, "Fire Away" was posted on the band's Myspace, followed by "2009" on September 10, 2009. Ups and Downsizing was made available for streaming on September 27, 2009, prior to its release through Fueled by Ramen two days later. On the same day, a music video was released for "Fire Away". Behind-the-scenes footage on the making of the video was posted on PureVolume.

To promote Ups and Downsizing, the band supported labelmates Paramore on their headlining US tour, which ran through October 2009, and appeared at The Fest. Jonathan Diener said Paramore's vocalist Hayley Williams had been a strong supporter of the Swellers, prior them joining Fueled by Ramen. The Swellers supported Less Than Jake on their US tour throughout November and December 2009. In January and February 2010, the Swellers then supported Motion City Soundtrack on their headlining tour of the US. During this trek, an acoustic version of "Feet First" was posted on Myspace. In April 2010, the band appeared at the Groezrock festival in Belgium and embarked on their debut UK tour, which ran into May 2010. Coinciding with this, Ups and Downsizing was released in the UK on April 12, 2010. They went on a short tour with Crime in Stereo and This Time Next Year, and appeared at Bled Fest, prior to a stint on the Warped Tour until July 2010. From mid-August to early October 2010, the band supported Fireworks on their headlining tour of the US. On October 27, 2010, a music video was released for "Sleeper".

== Reception ==
Professional ratings
Review scores
Source	Rating
AbsolutePunk	89%
Alternative Press	4.5/5 stars
Alter the Press!	4.5/5
Punknews.org	4.5/5 stars
Rock Sound	9/10

Ups and Downsizing was met with generally favourable reviews from music critics. Nassiff found it to be "certainly their most accessible record yet", praising Nick Diener's vocals, with melodies that were "more prominent" than the band's past work. Brendan Manley of Alternative Press said the album was "pure energy personified"; he added that it was a "rock-solid collection of songs that's perfectly at home with the [Four Year Strong and Set Your Goals] crowd, but still unique and memorable". He also complimented Diener's voice, which was "strong enough to soar over such a formidable backing" track.

Punknews.org writer Bryne Yancey said that the band's "technical proficiency is still here," though subdued and "more subtly solid than it ever has been, which makes these songs sound far more timeless than anything in their back catalogue". Andy Ritchie of Rock Sound wrote that it was a "pedal-to-the-metal, full throttle collection of power-chord anthems with a lyrical hook round every corner". Soundthesirens founder Billy Ho said it was surprising that in "in a scene on the verge of colla/pse under the weight of shittyness [...] a band like the Swellers could sound so damn good".

Williams and Zak Glosserman of Orange have both expressed admiration for the album.

== Track listing ==
All songs written by Nick and Jonathan Diener.

1. "2009" – 2:56
2. "Fire Away" – 3:52
3. "Sleeper" – 2:55
4. "Welcome Back Riders" – 2:55
5. "Feet First" – 4:07
6. "Do You Feel Better Yet?" – 2:27
7. "Ups and Downsizing" – 3:47
8. "The Iron" – 2:13
9. "Watch It Go" – 4:09
10. "Stars" – 5:49
11. "Dirt" – 4:05

== Personnel ==
Personnel per booklet.

The Swellers

- Nick Diener – vocals, guitar
- Jonathan Diener – drums
- Ryan Collins – guitar
- Anto Boros – bass

Additional musicians

- Eric Hausser – additional vocals
- Sal Panza – additional vocals
- Brian Phee – additional vocals
- Jared Rohde – additional vocals

Production and design

- The Swellers – producer
- Mark Michalik – producer, engineer
- Ted Jensen – mastering
- Carolyn Tracey – packaging production
- Nicholas Bilardello – art direction, design
- Pete Flaherty – photography
- Nick Diener – art concept
- Jonathan Diener – art concept
