= Give it a Name =

Annual British rock music festival

- Genre: Alternative, Post-hardcore, Punk, Indie
- Dates: April or May
- Locations: London, England (2005–present); Manchester, England (2006, 2009) Birmingham, England (2007 only); Glasgow, Scotland (2007 only); Sheffield, England (2008 only) Cologne, Germany (2007–present); Munich, Germany (2008–present); Vienna, Austria (2008–present); Paris, France (2007 only); Berlin, Germany (2007 only)
- Years active: 2005–2010
- Website: Official Website

Give it a Name, also known as GIAN (and Give It a Name Incoming in 2009), named after an At the Drive-In song, was an annual British rock music festival, normally held on the weekend nearest to the end of April. The first festival took place on 2 May 2005 at Alexandra Palace, North London. In 2006, Give it a Name became a paired, two-day festival, taking place at the MEN Arena, Manchester, and Earl's Court, London. 2007 saw the festival extend to three days and six different locations, including events for the first time in Scotland, France and Germany. The festival tended to feature post-hardcore, indie rock and alternative bands.

Give It a Name went ahead in 2009 despite the controversy of it possibly being cancelled. Rumours were dismissed when the official Myspace page of Give It a Name was seen to contain only a countdown clock expiring on 4 February. It was then announced on 3 February that Taking Back Sunday and Enter Shikari will headline the 2 day festival over 2 venues by Kerrang!'s Myspace page and official website. In 2009, the festival underwent some slight changes, with it being scaled down from the usual arena venues to smaller sized academy venues, along with it being renamed to Give It a Name Incoming and with only 14 bands playing over the weekend. In 2010 for the first year in its history, there was no festival, only a small five band UK tour.

== Give it a Name 2005 ==
=== Main Stage ===
Monday 2nd - London

Funeral for a Friend
Finch
Coheed & Cambria
Rise Against
Alexisonfire
Mae
The Lucky Nine
Fightstar
MC Lars
mewithoutYou

== Give it a Name 2006 ==
=== Main Stage ===
| Saturday 29th - London Sunday 30th - Manchester | Sunday 30th - London Saturday 29th - Manchester |
|---|---|
| My Chemical Romance; The Ataris; Atreyu; Thrice; Panic! at the Disco; Underoath; The Bled | Lostprophets; Angels & Airwaves; Taking Back Sunday; Goldfinger; We Are Scientists; Aiden; Silverstein |

=== Second Stage ===
| Saturday 29th - London Sunday 30th - Manchester | Sunday 30th - London Saturday 29th - Manchester |
|---|---|
| Billy Talent; Men, Women & Children; Drive By; Paramore; The Honorary Title; Taint | Hundred Reasons; Say Anything; Classic Case; Bayside; Gym Class Heroes; The Blackout |

== Give it a Name 2007 ==
=== Main Stage ===
| Saturday 28th - London Sunday 29th - Birmingham | Friday 27th - London Saturday 28th - Birmingham Sunday 29th - Glasgow | Friday 27th - Birmingham Sunday 29th - London | Friday 20th - Cologne Sunday 22nd - Berlin | Tuesday 24th - Paris | Wednesday 25th - Paris |
|---|---|---|---|---|---|
| Brand New; The All-American Rejects; New Found Glory; Motion City Soundtrack; Enter Shikari; Senses Fail; Madina Lake | HIM; The Used; Alexisonfire; Fightstar; Biffy Clyro (Glasgow only); Juliette and the Licks (Birmingham and Glasgow only); Mindless Self Indulgence; Kill Hannah; Cry for Silence (London and Birmingham Only) | AFI; Jimmy Eat World; The Automatic (London Only); Sparta; Hit the Lights; The Receiving End of Sirens; Boys Like Girls; Attack In Black | Jimmy Eat World; Sparta; Senses Fail mewithoutYou; Lagwagon (Cologne only); Motion City Soundtrack (Berlin only); The Sleeping; Mindless Self Indulgence; MxPx; Voodoo Glow Skulls; Gallows; Grown at Home; One Fine Day | AFI; Jimmy Eat World; Enter Shikari; Motion City Soundtrack; Aiden; The Sleeping; Tracy Gang Pussy | New Found Glory; The Used; MxPx; Sparta; Saosin; Senses Fail mewithoutYou; Minimum Serious |

=== Second Stage ===
| Saturday 28th - London Sunday 29th - Birmingham | Friday 27th - London Saturday 28th - Birmingham Sunday 29th - Glasgow | Friday 27th - Birmingham Sunday 29th - London |
|---|---|---|
| Cute is What We Aim For; Saosin; Kevin Devine; Zebrahead; Kids In Glass Houses; The Zico Chain | Fightstar; The Sleeping; Ignite; The Pink Spiders; LostAlone | Hellogoodbye; The Audition mewithoutyou MxPx; Beat Union |

== Give it a Name 2008 ==
Failsafe were MC Lars' backing band.

=== Main Stage ===
| Saturday 10th - London Sunday 11th - Sheffield | Sunday 11th - London Saturday 10th - Sheffield |
|---|---|
| Paramore; Plain White T's; Alkaline Trio; Finch; Set Your Goals; Cobra Starship; Chiodos | Thirty Seconds to Mars; Billy Talent; Glassjaw; Silverstein; The Blackout; Strike Anywhere; Envy On The Coast |

=== Second Stage ===
| Saturday 10th - London Sunday 11th - Sheffield | Sunday 11th - London Saturday 10th - Sheffield |
|---|---|
| The Audition; All Time Low; My American Heart; MC Lars; Mayday Parade; Meg & Dia; Broadway Calls | Anti Flag; Armor For Sleep; You Me At Six; State Radio; The Color Fred; Four Year Strong; Mexicolas |

== Give it a Name Incoming 2009 ==
2009's scaled-down and renamed festival took place on 17 and 19 April at London's Brixton Academy and on 18 and 19 April at the Manchester Academy. A total of 14 bands played, with seven playing on each day on just the one stage. Tickets went on general sale on 6 February at 9am on all ticket websites across the UK.

=== Main Stage ===
| Sunday 19 April - London Saturday 18 April - Manchester | Friday 17 April - London Sunday 19 April - Manchester |
|---|---|
| Taking Back Sunday; Underoath; Thursday; Escape The Fate; Innerpartysystem; VersaEmerge; Whole Wheat Bread | Enter Shikari; The Blackout; The Academy Is; The King Blues; Emery; Lights; In This Moment |

== Give It A Name Introduces 2010 ==
Various Cities in the United Kingdom

The Swellers
Anarbor
The Dangerous Summer
Rio
The Wild
