= Hope (The Blackout album) =

Studio album by The Blackout
- Released: 4 April 2011
- Studios: AIR, Angelic, The Yard
- Genres: Post-hardcore; alternative metal
- Length: 40:34
- Label: Cooking Vinyl
- Producer: Jason Perry

The Blackout chronology
The Best in Town (2009)	Hope (2011)	Start the Party (2013)

Singles from Hope
- 1. "Higher & Higher" Released: 28 March 2011; 2. "Never By Your Side" Released: 4 May 2011; 3. "The Storm" Released: 20 June 2011; 4. "You're Not Alone" Released: 23 September 2011

Professional ratings
Aggregate scores
Source	Rating
Metacritic	71/100
Review scores
Source	Rating
AltMusicHub	4/5 stars
Melodic	3/5 stars
Rock Sound	8/10

Hope is the third studio album by Welsh rock band The Blackout.

== Production ==
The album was first announced in mid-2010 that the band had begun work on the album. The album was recorded at the end of 2010 and was funded by donations by fans on the website PledgeMusic. Recording was held at AIR Studios, Angelic Studios, and The Yard, with producer Jason Perry. Adam Noble acted as engineer, with additional engineering from Perry; the pair did Pro Tools editing. An assistant engineer aided them at each studio: Fiona Cruickshank (AIR), Tom Fuller (Angelic), and Mark Allaway (The Yard). Due to drummer Gareth Lawrence does not drum on the album, his place was taken by drummers Phillip Jenkins of Kids in Glass Houses and Tom Winch of Hexes. John Mitchell mixed all of the recordings, before they were mastered by Tom Baker at Precision Mastering.

== Release ==
On 12 January 2011, vocalist Gavin Butler said their new album would be titled Hope. "Ambition Is Critical" was released as a free download on 21 January from the group's website. Following the track being played on BBC Radio 1's Rock Show, a music video was released for the track on 25 January. Two days later, the album's artwork and track listing were revealed. The first single to be released from the album was Higher & Higher, which features Hyro Da Hero. The formerly titled "Whatever You Hear, Don't Scream" was released on 13 February 2011 on iTunes as a one track single. On 28 March 2011 it was released again this time with two b-sides, a Tek One remix and a Live recording from their Nottingham Show on the My Chemical Romance World Contamination Tour.

In March and April, the group went on a UK tour alongside the Swellers and Hyro da Hero. A music video was released for "Never by Your Side" on 10 May. Kerrang! magazine revealed that it would be released as the second single with an expected release date of 30 May. On 18 July, a music video was released for "The Storm". The group appeared at the Reading and Leeds Festivals in August, before headlining the main stage at Merthyr Rock festival in September. A music video was released for "You're Not Alone" on 23 September. In October and November, the group went on a UK headlining tour with support from We Are the Ocean and Canterbury.

== Track listing ==
All music and lyrics by the Blackout and Jason Perry, except for "Higher & Higher" by the Blackout, Perry, and Hyron Fenton.

No.	Title	Length
1.	"Ambition Is Critical"	4:01
2.	"Never by Your Side"	3:26
3.	"Higher & Higher" (feat. Hyro da Hero)	3:17
4.	"Hope (Scream It Out Loud)"	3:45
5.	"This Is Our Time"	3:06
6.	"The Last Goodbye"	4:09
7.	"No More Waiting"	3:36
8.	"The Devil Inside"	3:15
9.	"You're Not Alone"	3:37
10.	"Keep on Moving"	3:59
11.	"The Storm"	4:25

Deluxe edition bonus tracks
No.	Title	Length
1.	"Party Hard" (Andrew W.K. cover)	3:07
2.	"Lump" (The Presidents of the United States of America cover)	2:11
3.	"Save Tonight" (Eagle-Eye Cherry cover)	3:31
4.	"Fight for Your Right to Party" (Beastie Boys cover)	3:11
5.	"You're Not Alone" (acoustic)	3:33
6.	"Hope" (acoustic)	4:13

== Personnel ==
Personnel per booklet.

The Blackout

- Sean Smith – vocals
- Gavin Butler – vocals
- James Davies – guitar
- Matthew Davies – guitar
- Rhys Lewis – bass

Additional musicians

- Philip Jenkins – drums
- Thomas Winch – drums
- Taylor Jane Smith – gang vocals
- Frances Sales – gang vocals
- Emma Courridge – gang vocals
- Hayley Connelly – gang vocals
- Nick Harnett – gang vocals
- Sean Goulding – gang vocals
- Hyro da Hero – vocals (track 3)

Production and design

- Jason Perry – producer, additional engineering, Pro Tools editing
- John Mitchell – mixing
- Adam Noble – engineer, Pro Tools editing
- Fiona Cruickshank – assistant engineer
- Tom Fuller – assistant engineer
- Mark Allaway – assistant engineer
- Tom Baker – mastering
- Steven Fessey – artwork
- Ismay Ozga-Lawn – additional photography

== Charts ==
Chart (2011)	Peak position
UK Albums Chart	27
UK Rock Albums Chart	1
UK Indie Albums Chart	6
