= Higher & Higher (The Blackout song) =

Single by The Blackout

from the album Hope
- Released: 13 February 2011
- Genre: Rap rock, pop-punk
- Length: 3:15
- Songwriter: The Blackout

Music video
- "Higher & Higher" on YouTube

"Higher & Higher" is a song by The Blackout, featuring Hyro Da Hero. It is the first single to be released from the band's third studio album Hope, on 4 February 2011. BBC Radio 1's Zane Lowe chose the single as his "Hottest record in the world" on 2 February and gave the song its first radio play. On 28 March 2011 it was re-released, this time with two b-sides, a 'Tek One Remix' and a Live recording from their Nottingham Show on the My Chemical Romance World Contamination Tour.

== Track listing ==
No.	Title	Length
1.	"Higher & Higher" (featuring Hyro da Hero)	3:17
2.	"Higher & Higher" (Tek-One Remix)	2:16
3.	"Higher & Higher" (live from My Chemical Romance World Contamination Tour)	3:56

== Music video ==
The music video was directed by the music video team Sitcom Soldiers, who have previously worked with the bands Young Guns and You Me at Six. It features the band packing their equipment away into a van when a woman gets in the front and drives off. As she is driving off, the band's tour manager (played by British gymnast and free runner Damien Walter) comes out and notices the truck leaving so he engages in a chase through the streets of Manchester. The band are seen playing throughout the song inside the van with Hyro Da Hero appearing on the side of the van for his rapping verse.

== Chart performance ==
Chart (2011)	Peak position
UK Rock Chart	2
UK Indie (OCC)	26
