= End of Discussion (album) =

Studio album by The Swellers
- Released: December 3, 2003
- Genre: Punk rock, melodic hardcore
- Length: 28:16
- Label: Self-released

The Swellers chronology
End of Discussion (2003)	Beginning of the End Again (2005)

End of Discussion is an album by Flint, Michigan punk rock band The Swellers. The album was self-released by the band in 2003. The album was reissued digitally in December 2008.

== Track listing ==
1. "Immunity" - 1:38
2. "Anything" - 2:35
3. "His Name Is Robert Paulson" - 2:48
4. "Sightless " - 2:31
5. "I Wanna Be in the Mob" - 1:21
6. "Sunshine" - 4:44
7. "Zombie Pirates from Outer Space" - 2:33
8. "Erased" - 3:37
9. "Losing My Girl" - 3:19
10. "Get the Process Changed" - 3:10
