= Hyro the Hero =

American rapper

- Born: Hyron Louis Fenton Jr. July 18, 1987 (age 39); Houston, Texas, U.S.
- Genres: Hip hop; nu metal; rap rock; rap metal; punk rap
- Occupations: Musician; rapper; songwriter
- Years active: 2007–present
- Website: hyrothehero.com

Hyro the Hero, formerly Hyro Da Hero (born Hyron Louis Fenton Jr., July 18, 1987), is an American rapper from Houston, Texas. After spending over a decade in Los Angeles, he has now made France his home.

== Career ==
Hyro moved to Los Angeles in November 2007, and shortly afterward released his first mixtape, Gangsta Rock, on Christmas Eve 2007 via iLike. His second mix tape, Rock & Roll Gangsta, released August 8, 2008, was dedicated to the memory of Ryan Halligan, who committed suicide after enduring years of bullying. His third mix tape, Belo Horizonte, named for a city in Brazil and released on Christmas Eve 2009, contained his first track with no samples, "Dirty South Rock".

Hyro recorded his debut album Birth, School, Work, Death which includes tracks produced by Ross Robinson featuring Paul Hinojos (At the Drive-in, the Mars Volta, Sparta) on bass, Daniel Anderson (Idiot Pilot, Glowbug) on guitar, and the Blood Brothers alumni Cody Votolato also on guitar, and Mark Gajadhar on drums. Birth, School, Work, Death was released in the UK and Ireland on April 4, 2011, with worldwide release following later in the year.

Hyro embarked on his first tour with a full band in the UK and Ireland in April 2012, with Welsh post-hardcore band the Blackout. Hyro also appeared on their single "Higher & Higher" from their album Hope.

In June, Hyro performed at Download Festival at Donington Park in England. After watching his Friday performance, the festival's promoter, Andy Copping, added Hyro to the second stage on Sunday the 12th. Hyro also played on the Jägermeister Acoustic stage with his DJ and drummer, making him the first and only artist in the history of Download Festival to perform on three separate stages in the same year. On the Saturday in between his Friday and Sunday performances, Hyro performed with Wu-Tang Clan in London and then again Edinburgh, Scotland the following Monday.

That same month, Hyro was nominated by Kerrang! as Best International Newcomer at the 2011 Kerrang! Awards.

Hyro Da Hero embarked on his first US tour with his current band later that summer, performing with Hollywood Undead and All That Remains on their 2011 summer tour. He was forced to cancel a UK tour in October/November.

=== 2012–present ===
In February 2012 Hyro returned to the UK for his first headline club tour. He also took part in Australia's Soundwave Festival in early March, appearing on the main stage in 4 cities: Brisbane, Sydney, Adelaide and Perth. Following the Soundwave Festival performances, Hyro went on tour with Mindless Self Indulgence on their US comeback tour in March and April 2012. He also appeared on the Vans Warped Tour 2012 and at the Summer Sonic Festival in Tokyo, Japan, August 18, 2012. During an Australian tour supporting Deftones, Hyro presented new material that was more hip hop based, which he is currently developing further.

In the winter of 2016 Hyro entered the recording studio with producer Mitchell Marlow to work new material, resulting in 2018's Flagged Channel. Its lead single was "Bullet".

In December 2018 he played at the Viper Room joined by James Shaffer Korn.

On September 25, 2020, Hyro released a single called "We Believe" featuring David Draiman from Disturbed.

In 2021 Hyro's song "Who's That Playing On The Radio?" featuring Danny Worsnop Asking Alexandria and Mick Mars Mötley Crüe is on the soundtracks of the movie The Retaliators.

In 2023 Hyro released his 3rd album, Bound For Glory, produced by Matt Good and featuring Corey Taylor (Slipknot), David Draiman (Disturbed), Chad Gray (Mudvayne, Hellyeah), Brandon Saller (Atreyu), Markus Videsäter (Solence), AJ Channer (Fire From The Gods)...

In August 2024, Hyro began recording his fourth album in London with Ben Bruce and Paul Bartolome from (Asking Alexandria). August 2025 marked the release of Hyro’s first single, "Black Rambo".

== Discography ==
=== Albums ===
- Birth, School, Work, Death (2011) [as Hyro Da Hero]
- Flagged Channel (2018)
- Bound For Glory (2023)

=== Singles ===
- "Ghetto Ambience" (2010) [as Hyro Da Hero]
- "We Still Popular" (2011) [as Hyro Da Hero]
- "Bullet" (2018) #30 Mainstream Rock Songs
- "Never Back Down" (feat. Myles Kennedy) (2018)
- "We Believe" (feat. David Draiman of Disturbed) (2020)
- "Fight" (feat. Chad Gray of Hellyeah) (2020)
- "Retaliation Generation" (feat. Spencer Charnas of Ice Nine Kills) (2021)
- "Legendary" (feat. Brandon Saller of Atreyu) (2021)
- "FU2" (feat. AJ Channer of Fire from the Gods) (2021)
- "Bound For Glory"(feat. Markus Videsäter of Solence) (2023)
- "Underratded" (with Rise of the Northstar) (2024)
- "Yeah!" (with Like a Storm and Kellin Quinn) (2024)
- "All Fucked (Live It Up)" with Like a Storm (2024)
- "Black Rambo" (2025)
