= The Blackout (band) =

Welsh rock band

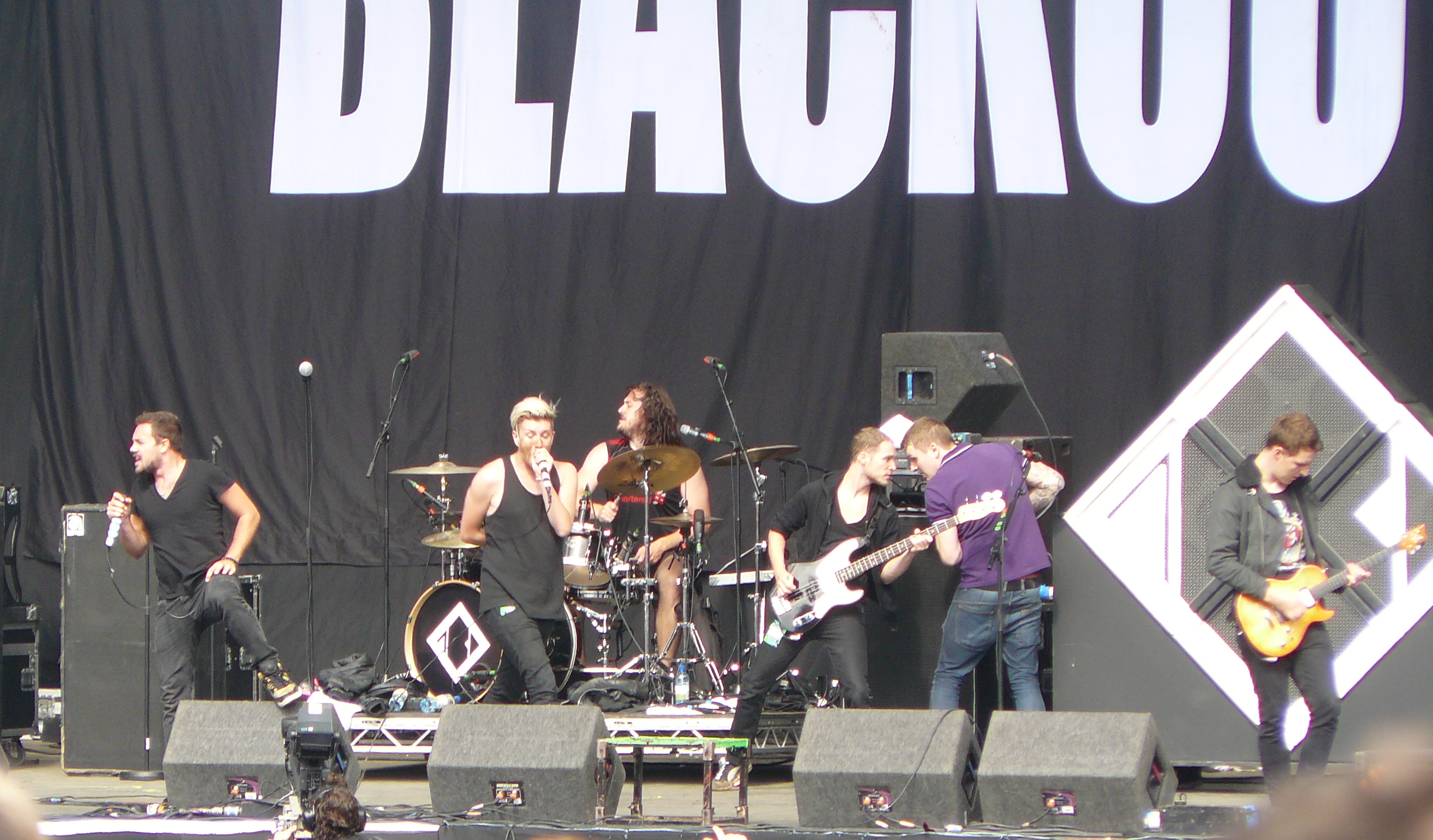
- The Blackout performing at Leeds Festival 2011

Background information
- Origin: Merthyr Tydfil, Wales
- Genres: Post-hardcore; punk rock; alternative rock
- Years active: 2003–2015; 2022–present
- Labels: Fierce Panda; Epitaph; Cooking Vinyl
- Members: Gavin Butler; James "Bob" Davies; Matthew Davies; Gareth "Snoz" Lawrence; Rhys Lewis; Sean Smith

The Blackout are a Welsh rock band from Merthyr Tydfil, formed in 2003. In 2007, the band released their debut album, We Are the Dynamite. Their second record, The Best in Town, was released in 2009. The band's third album, Hope, was released in 2011 and charted at number 27 in the UK album chart. Their fourth studio album, Start the Party, was released in 2013. The Blackout's final release was a five-track EP entitled Wolves, with their farewell tour held in early 2015, finishing in their hometown of Merthyr Tydfil in March 2015.

== History ==
=== Formation and early years (2003–2006) ===
The band formed in 2003 "out of boredom", originally called Ten Minute Preview; however after deciding to ditch this name they renamed themselves The Blackout, taken from a T-shirt saying "I survived the blackout" referring to the New York City blackout of 1977. Having performed with the likes of fellow Welsh bands, including Funeral for a Friend, Kids in Glass Houses, The Automatic and Lostprophets, as well as Reuben, Fightstar, and other big name bands The Blackout released their EP The Blackout! The Blackout! The Blackout! on 23 October 2006 through Fierce Panda Records, this led to Kerrang! nominating The Blackout for Best British Newcomer.

=== We Are the Dynamite (2007–2008) ===
Under a year later The Blackout released their debut album: We Are the Dynamite, on 1 October 2007 through Fierce Panda Records. The first single taken from it is entitled "The Beijing Cocktail" and was released on 24 September 2007. We Are the Dynamite is the fastest selling album ever released on Fierce Panda. To coincide with the band's debut album release they announced a 14-date headline UK tour with Flood of Red and Pierce the Veil followed by joining the Taste of Chaos tour across Europe in November 2007, replacing Escape the Fate and playing alongside The Used, Rise Against and Gallows.

The second single released from the album We Are the Dynamite was "It's High Tide Baby!". After further touring across the United Kingdom and Europe, April 2008 saw The Blackout's first jaunt to USA with a short tour of the midwest supporting blessthefall ending at Bamboozle Festival in New Jersey. In May, the band played at the Give It a Name festival for the second time, this time playing on the main stage alongside acts such as Silverstein, Billy Talent and Glassjaw. They also brought along entertainment team The Fuel Girls to support their stage presence. The Blackout also supported Story of the Year on their UK The Black Swan tour, both bands finished off the tour by playing Slam Dunk Festival in Leeds, UK. 8 September brought The Blackout's first visit to Japan playing a short 4 date stop with Alesana. On returning from Japan, The Blackout got straight on a bus to mainland Europe to tour with fellow Welshmen Attack! Attack! then returning to the UK where they were supported by The Medic Droid, We Are the Ocean and From First to Last. This tour saw The Blackout become only the third unsigned band ever to sell out the London Astoria. The previous bands being The Darkness and Enter Shikari respectively.

=== The Best in Town (2009) ===
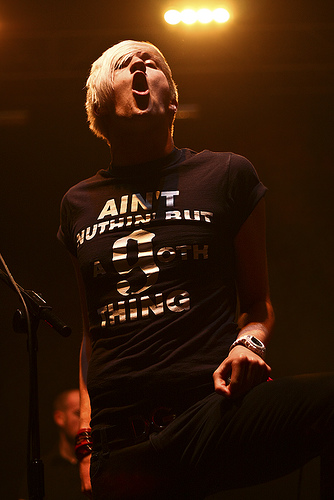
Sean Smith, performing Live in London, United Kingdom in 2009

In 2008 the band split with record label Fierce Panda, scrapping plans to release another two singles from We Are the Dynamite and "I Love Myself and I Wanna Live", this ultimately led to the band being signed to Epitaph Records in February 2009. After finishing up touring in 2008 the band began recording their second album, The Best in Town with A vocalist, Jason Perry at Sonic Ranch, El Paso, Texas. The rest of the vocal tracking was completed in Southend on Sea in early January. In March 2009 the band set out to LA to film a music video for their first single from The Best in Town, "Children of the Night" and for their second single, "Saves Our Selves", as well as meeting with record Label Epitaph, who are based in the US. The first single from The Best in Town, "Children of the Night", was released on 18 May. To promote this album, the band toured with The Urgency, Hollywood Undead and Silverstein, before playing at the Download Festival, where they ended up playing twice due to The Ghost of a Thousand pulling out at the last minute. They played at the Hevy Music Festival on 1 August 2009 and headlined Butserfest on 12 September playing alongside Go:Audio, We Are the Ocean and Attack! Attack!.

In January and February 2010 the band played the Kerrang! Relentless Energy Drink Tour alongside My Passion, Young Guns and All Time Low. Having performed backing vocals on You Me at Six's 2010 album Hold Me Down, Sean Smith appeared on stage with You Me at Six, at Newport Centre on 10 March 2010, and at Brixton Academy on 20 March 2010, with Gavin Butler, during the performance of "The Consequence", both times receiving an enthusiastic reception. In June 2010, the band were confirmed to be support Paramore on their one-off show in Belfast in Northern Ireland. Frontwoman of the band Hayley Williams said that it was an honour to have the band that they supported in 2006 at the Give It a Name Festival supporting them on their headline show. The band also toured Europe with Limp Bizkit in Autumn 2010, fulfilling an ambition for the band, who cite Limp Bizkit as a major influence.

=== Hope (2011–2012) ===
On 28 September 2010, frontman Sean Smith announced that the band was heading to the studio in preparation to record their third studio album. They finished writing the songs on 11 November 2010. On 26 November 2010, the band posted a tweet on their Twitter account, stating that the album is "all wrapped up & done recording" and that the record would be mixed the following week.

On 12 January 2011, Kerrang! announced the title of the third studio album would be Hope. Smith also stated, "there's the wide-eyed hope and the negative, almost desperate meaning of the word (hope), too. The word has appeared a lot in the lyrics. The songs are also a little darker than the ones on our previous record, The Best in Town." Hope was released on 4 April 2011. On 13 January 2011, the band announced on their Twitter account that they would be making an exclusive track called "Ambition Is Critical" available for free download on the band's official site, on 24 January.

The Blackout supported My Chemical Romance on their World Contamination Tour along with LostAlone in February 2011. On 1 March 2011, The Blackout released the video for Higher and Higher. On 21 March 2011, it was announced that The Blackout would play the main stage at the 2011 Reading and Leeds Festivals. On 30 March 2011, The Blackout started touring the Hope album with support from Texan Rock Rapper Hyro Da Hero (who appears on their track "Higher and Higher") as well as Michigan pop-punk band The Swellers. This was followed by a European tour supporting Funeral for a Friend and a headline appearance at Liverpool's Hub Festival. Following their appearance at Reading and Leeds Festival, the band closed the inaugural Merthyr Rock festival on 4 September, which took place in their hometown of Merthyr Tydfil. This was followed by a UK and European headline tour, their biggest to date, throughout October and November, with support from We Are the Ocean, Canterbury and Red Bull Bedroom Jam 2011 winners Page 44.

On 20 January 2012, it was announced that The Blackout would be becoming one of the headlining acts on Kerrang! Tour, alongside New Found Glory, throughout February. This replacement was because of Sum 41's frontman Deryck Whibley having a severe back injury. The band entered the studio once more with Jason Perry in May 2012 to record their fourth studio album. The band took a break from the recording process to play the Slam Dunk Festival on the main stage, supporting Taking Back Sunday. On Thursday 7 June, the band appeared at the annual Kerrang! Awards, with frontman Sean Smith having been nominated for 'Tweeter of the Year'. While he lost out on the award, the band picked up the Devotion Award, voted by the magazine's staff. In July 2012, The Blackout are to support Blink-182 on four dates of the European leg of their 20th Anniversary Tour. The band were also announced to play the T in the Park and Reading and Leeds Festivals in the summer of 2012.

=== Start the Party (2012–2014) ===
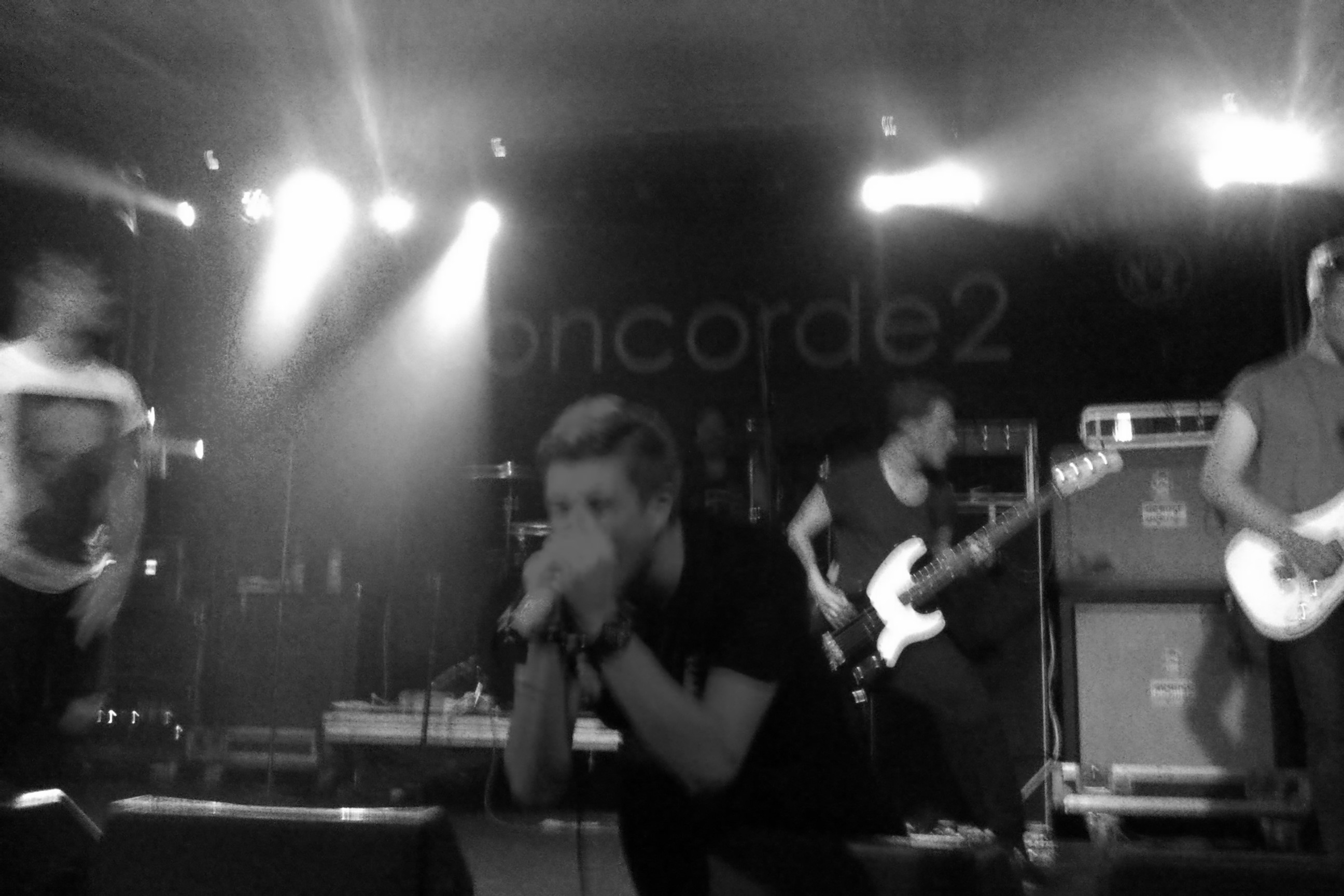
The Blackout in 2013

On 24 August 2012, The Blackout performed "Start the Party", their first single from the album of the same name for the first time at the Sugarmill in Stoke-on-Trent, a warm-up gig for Reading Festival . On 17 September 2012, after a countdown on their official website, the first track, "Start the Party" from the album of the same name aired for the first time on Zane Lowe's show on BBC Radio 1. This coincided with the announcement of the album's title and release date (21 January 2013), a supporting tour in January and the title track's music video. "Start the Party" was also available for free download on the band's website. On 22 November 2012, the band's second single from their fourth album "Running Scared" was aired for the first time on Zane Lowe's show on BBC Radio 1. Both music videos for "Start the Party" and "Running Scared" were filmed in Ibiza, Spain. In April 2013, the band released "Radio" as the third single from the album.

In August 2014 it was announced that the band will be headlining across the UK in November with support acts Chiodos and When We Were Wolves.

=== Split and reunion ===
In December 2014, the band announced that they were splitting up and would perform their last shows in March 2015.

On 7 March 2015, the band played their last festival date at Takedown Festival, Southampton.

In 2019, it was announced that Smith and James Davies had formed a new band called Raiders.

During a September 2021 interview with Matthew Davies-Kreye on the Sappenin' Podcast, Sean Smith revealed that The Blackout had been asked to support Funeral For A Friend for a charity show in 2019, which they had considered playing. Smith stated The Blackout just "couldn't organise it", leading Raiders to fill the support slot instead.

On the 5th June 2023 the band performed a sold-out re-union show at Redhouse Cymru followed up by performing at Download Festival later in June 2023. On the 12th July 2023 the band announced a first UK tour since 2015.

== Band members ==
- Gavin Butler – lead vocals
- Sean Smith – co-lead vocals
- James "Bob" Davies – rhythm guitar, backing vocals
- Matthew Davies – lead guitar, backing vocals
- Rhys Lewis – bass
- Gareth "Snoz" Lawrence – drums, percussion

== Discography ==
=== Albums ===
Year	Title	Chart Positions
Year	Title	UK
2007	We Are the Dynamite	93
2009	The Best in Town	38
2011	Hope	27
2013	Start the Party	35

=== EPs ===
Year	Title
2004	Pull No Punches
2006	The Blackout! The Blackout! The Blackout!
2014	Wolves

=== Singles ===
Title	Year	Peak chart positions				Album
Title	Year	UK	UK Rock	UK Indie	SCO	Album
"Hard Slammin'"	2007	-	8	23	-	The Blackout! The Blackout! The Blackout!
"The Beijing Cocktail"	2007	90	-	4	37	We Are the Dynamite
"It's High Tide Baby!"	2008	-	-	21	-	We Are the Dynamite
"Children of the Night"	2009	128	1	-	28	The Best in Town
"Save Our Selves (The Warning)"	2009	189	9	-	59	The Best in Town
"I Don't Care (This Is Why We Can't Have Nice Things)"	2009	107	7	9	55	The Best in Town
"Higher & Higher"	2011	171	2	26	-	Hope
"Never by Your Side"	2011	-	-	-	-	Hope
"The Storm"	2011	-	-	-	-	Hope
"You're Not Alone"	2011	-	-	-	-	Hope
"Start the Party"	2012	-	22	-	-	Start the Party
"Running Scared"	2012	-	35	-	-	Start the Party

=== Other songs ===
- "My Generation" (Limp Bizkit cover) on Kerrang's compilation Higher Voltage.
- "The Gentle Art of Making Enemies" (Live Faith No More cover) released as a B-side to "The Beijing Cocktail".
- "I Kissed a Girl" (Katy Perry cover) released as a B-side on the "Children of the Night" CD
- "Pastor of Muppets" released as a B-side on the "Children of the Night" vinyl
- "Lapdance" (N*E*R*D cover, the band recorded a studio version of the song to be released on the "Children of the Night" single but it was not approved by the original artist, however the band have played it live)
- "Wanted Dead or Alive" (Live Bon Jovi cover)
- "(You Gotta) Fight for Your Right (To Party!)" (Beastie Boys cover) released on the 2-disc special edition of Hope
- "Party Hard" (Andrew W.K. cover) released on the 2-disc special edition of Hope
- "Lump" (The Presidents of the United States of America cover) released on the 2-disc special edition of Hope
- "Save Tonight" (Eagle-Eye Cherry cover) released on the 2-disc special edition of Hope
- "Stay Away" (Nirvana Cover) released on Kerrang's "Kerrang! Presents Nirvana Nevermind Forever".
- "Boom! Shake the Room" (DJ Jazzy Jeff & The Fresh Prince cover) released on Start The Party album.
- "Sorry for Party Rocking" (LMFAO cover) released on Start The Party album.
- "Super Freak" (Rick James cover) released on Start The Party album.

=== Music videos ===
- The Beijing Cocktail
- It's High Tide Baby!
- Children of the Night
- Save Our Selves (The Warning)
- I Don't Care (This is Why We Can't Have Nice Things)
- Ambition is Critical
- Higher and Higher
- Never by Your Side
- The Storm
- You're Not Alone
- Start the Party
- Running Scared
- Radio
- Take Away The Misery
- Wolves

== Honours ==
- The Blackout were nominated for the Kerrang! British Newcomer award, and also played the Kerrang! New Breed launch show.
- In December 2006, The Blackout won best new Welsh act at The Pop Factory awards held in the Coal Exchange in Cardiff Bay. The awards ceremony was televised on ITV1 Wales.
- The Blackout won Best Unsigned Band in Kerrang! magazine's Readers Poll 2008.
- Sean Smith came third in "Sexiest Male" category in the 2008 Reader's Poll for Kerrang! Magazine.
- "Save Ourselves (The Warning)" was nominated for the Best Single award at the Kerrang! Awards 2010.
- They were nominated for three Kerrang! Awards in 2011; Best Video for Higher & Higher, Best Album for Hope, and Best British Band.
- Sean Smith was nominated for 'Tweeter of the Year' at the 2012 Kerrang! Awards but lost to Hayley Williams of Paramore.
- The Blackout won the Devotion award at the 2012 Kerrang! Awards.
