= Yo La Tengo discography =

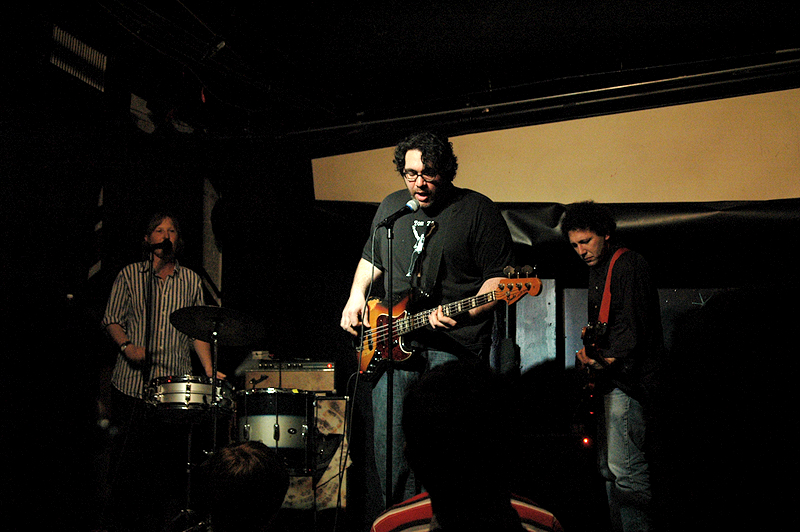
- Yo La Tengo performing in 2005
- Studio albums: 17
- Extended plays: 17
- Compilation albums: 6
- Singles: 22
- B-sides: 15
- Music videos: 19
- Collaborations: 4
- Film scores: 2

The discography of Yo La Tengo, an indie rock band based in Hoboken, New Jersey, consists of seventeen studio albums, six compilation albums, sixteen extended plays, twenty-two singles, two film score albums, four collaborative albums, and one album of cover songs.

== Albums ==
=== Studio albums ===
List of studio albums, with selected chart positions
Title	Album details	Peak chart positions								
Title	Album details	US	BEL (FL)	BEL (WA)	GER	FRA	NLD	POR	SPA	UK
Ride the Tiger	Released: 1986; Label: Coyote; Format: LP	—	—	—	—	—	—	—	—	—
New Wave Hot Dogs	Released: 1987; Label: Coyote; Format: LP	—	—	—	—	—	—	—	—	—
President Yo La Tengo	Released: 1989; Label: Coyote; Format: LP	—	—	—	—	—	—	—	—	—
Fakebook	Released: 1990; Label: Bar/None; Format: LP, CD	—	—	—	—	—	—	—	—	—
May I Sing with Me	Released: February 28, 1992; Label: Alias; Format: LP, CD	—	—	—	—	—	—	—	—	—
Painful	Released: October 5, 1993; Label: Matador; Format: LP, CD	—	—	—	—	—	—	—	—	—
Electr-O-Pura	Released: May 2, 1995; Label: Matador; Format: LP, CD	—	—	—	—	—	—	—	—	—
I Can Hear the Heart Beating as One	Released: April 22, 1997; Label: Matador; Format: LP, CD	—	—	—	—	—	—	—	—	— (Note: I Can Hear the Heart Beating as One did not enter the UK Albums Chart, but it peaked at number 24 on the UK Independent Albums Chart.)
And Then Nothing Turned Itself Inside-Out	Released: February 22, 2000; Label: Matador; Format: LP, CD	138	—	—	—	—	—	—	—	79
Summer Sun	Released: April 8, 2003; Label: Matador; Format: LP, CD	115	—	—	95	—	—	—	—	76
I Am Not Afraid of You and I Will Beat Your Ass	Released: September 12, 2006; Label: Matador; Format: LP, CD	66	—	—	70	179	—	—	—	87
Popular Songs	Released: September 8, 2009; Label: Matador; Format: LP, CD	58	97	—	100	173	—	—	88	—
Fade	Released: January 15, 2013; Label: Matador; Format: LP, CD, download	26	32	58	66	—	88	23	40	82
Stuff Like That There	Released: August 28, 2015; Label: Matador; Format: LP, CD, download, cassette	96	77	86	—	85	76	29	35	86
There's a Riot Going On	Released: March 16, 2018; Label: Matador; Format: LP, CD, download	136	178	—	63	—	175	31	56	60
We Have Amnesia Sometimes	Released: July 17, 2020; Label: Matador; Format: LP, download	—	—	—	—	—	—	—	—	—
This Stupid World	Released: February 10, 2023; Label: Matador; Format: LP, CD, download	—	69	106	18	188	—	20	41	—
"—" denotes a recording that did not chart.

=== Compilation albums ===
Title	Album details	Notes
Genius + Love = Yo La Tengo	Released: September 10, 1996; Label: Matador; Format: CD, LP	Consists of rarities, alternate versions, and out-takes, spanning 1988 to 1995
Mishmoshi-Moshi	Released: 2000; Label: Trama; Format: CD	Brazilian edition of 2000 Japanese compilation, and is a combination of UK's 'You Can Have It All' CD single & the 'Danelectro' CD EP.
Prisoners of Love: A Smattering of Scintillating Senescent Songs: 1985–2003	Released: 2005; Label: Matador; Format: 2xCD, 3xCD	A best-of compilation album, available in two or three disc editions where the third CD consisted of out-takes and rarities from 1986 to 2002
Yo La Tengo Is Murdering the Classics	Released: 2006; Label: Egon; Format: CD	A compilation of cover songs performed at the annual WFMU fundraisers (1996–2003).
They Shoot, We Score	Released: September 12, 2008; Label: Egon; Format: CD	Compiles songs written and recorded for the films Old Joy (2006), Junebug (2005), Game 6 (2005) and Shortbus (2006)
Murder in the Second Degree	Released: 2016; Label: Egon; Format: CD	Another compilation of cover songs performed at the annual WFMU fundraisers (1996–2003).

=== Film score albums ===
Title	Album details	Notes
The Sounds of the Sounds of Science	Release: September 2002; Label: Egon; Format: LP, CD	78 minutes of instrumental music to accompany his eight short documentary-style films shot underwater for filmmaker Jean Painlevé.
The Original Score from the Motion Picture Adventureland	Released: September 8, 2009; Label: Matador; Format: LP	Made available only on LP upon pre-ordering Popular Songs through the Matador online store.
Old Joy	Release: February 2025; Label: Mississippi Records; Format: EP	Collaboration with Smokey Hormel features extended and alternate versions from their compilation of film work, They Shoot, We Score.

=== Collaborative albums ===
Title	Album details	Notes
Strange but True	Released: 1998; Label: Matador; Format: CD, LP	Collaboration with Jad Fair
V.O.T.E.	Released: 2004; Label: Yep Roc; Format: CD	Collaboration with Chris Stamey
Parallelogram	Released: 2015; Label: Three Lobed Recordings; Format: LP	Split album with Bardo Pond
Nursery Rhymes	Released: 2015; Label: Karaoke Kalk; Format: CD	Bill Wells & Friends. Yo La Tengo appear on 6 tracks

=== Other albums ===
Title	Album details	Notes
Fuckbook	Released: 2009; Label: Matador; Format: CD, LP	Released under the name Condo Fucks

== Extended plays ==
Title	Album details
That Is Yo La Tengo	Released: 1991; Label: City Slang; Format: 12", CD
Upside-Down	Released: 1992; Label: Alias; Format: CD
Shaker	Released: August 24, 1993; Label: Matador; Format: CD
From a Motel 6	Released: January 7, 1994; Label: Matador; Format: CD
Tom Courtenay	Released: March 21, 1995; Label: Matador, City Slang; Format: CD
Camp Yo La Tengo	Released: September 19, 1995; Label: Matador, City Slang; Format: CD
Little Honda	Released: 1997; Label: Matador; Format: CD
Autumn Sweater	Released: 1997; Label: Matador; Format: CD, 12"
Danelectro	Released: 2000; Label: Matador; Format: CD, 12"
Nuclear War	Released: 2002; Label: Matador; Format: CD, 12"
Merry Christmas from Yo La Tengo	Released: 2002; Label: Egon; Format: CD
Today Is the Day	Released: November 2, 2003; Label: Matador; Format: CD, 12"
Live Session	Released: 2007; Label: iTunes; Format: digital download
Here To Fall Remixes	Released: June 8, 2010; Label: Matador; Format: CD, 12"
Stupid Things	Released: September 25, 2012; Label: Matador; Format: CD, 12"
Sleepless Night	Released: October 9, 2020; Label: Matador; Format: 12", download
The Bunker Sessions	Released: November 8, 2023

== Singles ==
Year	Title	Label	Notes
1985	"The River of Water" b/w "A House Is Not a Motel": Release date: 1985; Format: 7"	Egon Records	"A House Is Not a Motel" by Arthur Lee
1987	"The Asparagus Song" b/w "For the Turnstiles": Release date: 1987; Format: 7"	Coyote Records	"For the Turnstiles" by Neil Young
1990	"Speeding Motorcycle": Release date: 1990; Format: 7"	Singles Only Label	With Daniel Johnston
1991	"Walking Away from You" b/w "Cast a Shadow": Release date: 1991; Format: 7"	Bar/None Records	"Cast A Shadow" by Beat Happening
1993	"Shaker" b/w "For Shame of Doing Wrong": Release date: 1993; Format: 7"	Matador Records	"For Shame of Doing Wrong" by Richard Thompson
1993	"Big Day Coming" b/w "Double Dare (Sominextraction)": Release date: September 30, 1993; Format: 7"	Matador Records	
1995	"Tom Courtenay" b/w "The Bisexual Boogie": Release date: 1995; Format: 7"	Matador Records (US); City Slang (UK)	
1995	Camp Yo La Tengo: Release date: September 19, 1995; Format: 7"	Matador Records	Contains "(Thin) Blue Line Swinger" and "Tom Courtenay"
1996	"Blue/Green Arrow" b/w "Watching the Sun Rise or Johnny Carson": Release date: 1996; Format: 7"	Earworm Records (UK)	
1996	"Rocket #9" b/w "Wig Out with Charly Dapper": Release date: 1996; Format: 7"	Planet Records (UK)	
1997	"Sugarcube" b/w "Busy with Me Thoughts": Release date: 1997; Format: 7"	Matador Records	
1997	"Little Honda": Release date: 1997; Format: 7"	Matador Records	"Little Honda" by Brian Wilson and Mike Love
1998	"Run Run Run" b/w "Urban Crusher": Release date: 1998; Format: 7"	Egon Records	"Run Run Run" (instrumental) by Velvet Underground
2000	"You Can Have It All (edit)" b/w "Ready-Mades": Release date: 2000; Format: 7"	Matador Records	"Ready-Mades" by Bonzo Dog Band A young Amy Poehler appears on the cover art
2006	"Mr. Tough" b/w "I'm Your Puppet": Release date: 2006; Format: 7"	Matador Records	
2009	"Here to Fall (Pete Rock Remix) ": Release date: 2009; Format: 7"	Matador Records	
2009	"Periodically Double or Triple": Release date: 2009; Format: 7"	Matador Records	
2009	"Do They Know It's Christmas?" (With Fucked Up, Ezra Koenig, David Cross, Kevin Drew, Tegan & Sara, Andrew W.K., Bob Mould, Kyp Malone, GZA): Release date: 2009; Format: 7"	Matador Records	Written by Midge Ure and Bob Geldof
2013	"Ohm" b/w "Oriole": Release date: 2013; Format: 12"	Matador Records	ORANGE COVER "Ohm" (album version) b/w "Oriole" (mix 12); RED COVER "Ohm" (live rock version) b/w "Oriole" (mix 15); BLUE COVER "Ohm" (live quiet version) b/w "Oriole" (mix 29)
2013	"Super Kiwi" b/w "A Day in the Life Of a Tree": Release date: 2013; Format: 7"	Matador Records	"A day in the Life Of a Tree" by Beach Boys
2013	"Toymaggedon": Release date: 2013; Format: 7"	Matador Records	With Ira Glass and Eugene Mirman
2015	"Friday I'm In Love": Release date: 2015; Format: 7"	Matador Records	Written by The Cure

== Music videos ==
Date	Title	Director(s)	Notes	Ref.
1988	"Teenager in Love"	Mike McGonigal	released on the VHS Mouthful of Sweat Video: Chemical Imbalance Video Compilation #1	
1988	"Everyday"	Mike McGonigal	released on the VHS Mouthful of Sweat Video: Chemical Imbalance Video Compilation #1	
Aug 1990	"The Summer"	Phil Morrison		
Apr 1992	"Upside-Down"	Peter Walsh		
1993	"Big Day Coming"	Phil Morrison		
1993	"From a Motel 6"	Hal Hartley	scrapped by Atlantic for being too arty	
Jan 23, 1994	"From a Motel 6"	David Kleiler		
Mar 1995	"Tom Courtenay"	Phil Morrison	cameo by Marshall Crenshaw	
Oct 1995	"Blue Line Swinger"	George Spyros		
Aug 3, 1997	"Sugarcube"	Phil Morrison	cameos by Bob Odenkirk, David Cross, & John Ennis	
Jul 28, 2009	"Here to Fall"	John McSwain	first in a series of four clips	
Aug 4, 2009	"Periodically Double or Triple"	John McSwain	second in a series of four clips	
Aug 11, 2009	"Avalon or Someone Very Similar"	John McSwain	third in a series of four clips	
Aug 18, 2009	"Nothing to Hide"	Pelham Johnston & Brandon Reichard		
Sep 1, 2009	"When It's Dark"	John McSwain	fourth in a series of four clips	
Nov 15, 2012	"Before We Run"	Emily Hubley		
Jan 28, 2013	"I'll Be Around"	Phil Morrison		
Jul 10, 2013	"Ohm"	Donick Cary	animated by Sugarshack Animation	
Aug 6, 2013	"Is That Enough"	Donick Cary	animated by Sugarshack Animation	
Jan 14, 2014	"Tree"	Jim Woodring (characters & storyboard) & Drop (animation)	released as DVD	
Jul 14, 2015	"Friday I'm In Love"	Jason Woliner		
Nov 2, 2022	"Fallout"	Sabrina Nichols	Lyric Video	
Feb 7, 2023	"Sinatra Drive Breakdown"	Curtis Godino		

== Songs ==
=== Originals ===
Year	Title	Available on	Written by
1985	"The River of Water"	"The River of Water" 7" (1985); Ride the Tiger reissue (1993, 1996); Prisoners of Love (2005)	Ira Kaplan
1985	"Private Doberman"	Luxury Condos Coming to Your Neighborhood Soon (1985)	Ira Kaplan
1986	"The Cone of Silence"	Ride the Tiger (1986); Yo Yo a Go Go (Live acoustic 1994) (1996)	Ira Kaplan
1986	"The Evil That Men Do"	Ride the Tiger (1986)	Ira Kaplan
1986	"The Forest Green"	Ride the Tiger (1986)	Georgia Hubley, Ira Kaplan
1986	"The Pain of Pain"	Ride the Tiger (1986)	Ira Kaplan
1986	"The Way Some People Die"	Ride the Tiger (1986)	Dave Schramm
1986	"Alrock's Bells"	Ride the Tiger (1986)	Ira Kaplan
1986	"Five Years"	Ride the Tiger (1986)	Dave Schramm, Tony Rubin
1986	"Screaming Dead Balloons"	Ride the Tiger (1986)	Ira Kaplan
1986	"Crispy Duck"	Ride the Tiger reissue (1993, 1996)	Ira Kaplan
1987	"Clunk"	New Wave Hot Dogs (1987)	Ira Kaplan
1987	"Did I Tell You"	New Wave Hot Dogs (1987)	Ira Kaplan
1987	"House Fall Down"	New Wave Hot Dogs (1987)	Ira Kaplan
1987	"Lewis"	New Wave Hot Dogs (1987); The Best of Mountain Stage (Live) (1992); Prisoners of Love (2005)	Ira Kaplan
1987	"Lost in Bessemer"	New Wave Hot Dogs (1987)	Ira Kaplan
1987	"3 Blocks from Groove St."	New Wave Hot Dogs (1987)	Ira Kaplan
1987	"Serpentine"	New Wave Hot Dogs (1987)	Ira Kaplan, Phil Milstein
1987	"A Shy Dog"	New Wave Hot Dogs (1987)	Ira Kaplan
1987	"No Water"	New Wave Hot Dogs (1987)	Ira Kaplan, Phil Milstein
1987	"The Story of Jazz"	New Wave Hot Dogs (1987); Prisoners of Love (2005)	Ira Kaplan
1987	"The Asparagus Song"	"The Asparagus Song" 7" (1987); President Yo La Tengo/New Wave Hot Dogs reissue (1993, 1996)	Ira Kaplan, Emily Hubley
1989	"Barnaby, Hardly Working"	President Yo La Tengo (1987); Fakebook (1990); Genius + Love = Yo La Tengo (Live) (1996); Prisoners of Love (2005)	Georgia Hubley, Ira Kaplan
1989	"Drug Test"	President Yo La Tengo (1987); Prisoners of Love (2005)	Ira Kaplan
1989	"The Evil That Men Do (Craig's Version)"	President Yo La Tengo (1987)	Ira Kaplan
1989	"Alyda"	President Yo La Tengo (1987)	Georgia Hubley, Ira Kaplan
1989	"The Evil That Men Do (Pablo's Version)"	President Yo La Tengo (1987)	Ira Kaplan
1990	"Can't Forget"	Fakebook (1990)	Yo La Tengo
1990	"The Summer"	Fakebook (1987); Prisoners of Love (2005)	Yo La Tengo
1990	"What Comes Next"	Fakebook (1990)	Yo La Tengo
1990	"Did I Tell You"	Fakebook (1987); Prisoners of Love (2005)	Yo La Tengo
1991	"Out the Window"	That Is Yo La Tengo 12" and CD (1991)	Yo La Tengo
1991	"Swing for Life"	That Is Yo La Tengo 12" and CD (1991)	Yo La Tengo
1991	"Walking Away from You"	That Is Yo La Tengo 12" and CD (1991); "Walking Away from You" 7" (1991); Genius + Love = Yo La Tengo (1996)	Georgia Hubley
1991	"Five Cornered Drone (Crispy Duck)"	That Is Yo La Tengo 12" and CD (1991); May I Sing with Me (1992)	Ira Kaplan
1991	"Fog Over Frisco"	That Is Yo La Tengo 12" and CD (1991); Genius + Love = Yo La Tengo (1996)	Ira Kaplan
1991	"Junk"	Real Underground Vol.2 (1991)	Ira Kaplan
1991	"Artificial Heart"	"Delicacy & Nourishment - Lyrics by Ernest Noyes Brookings Vol. 3" (1991); "Extra Painful" (1994) (Live); Genius + Love = Yo La Tengo (1996)	Ira Kaplan, Ernest Noyes Brookings
1992	"Detouring America with Horns"	May I Sing with Me (1992)	Georgia Hubley
1992	"Upside-Down"	May I Sing with Me (1992); Upside-Down CD EP (1992); Prisoners of Love (2005)	Ira Kaplan
1992	"Mushroom Cloud of Hiss"	May I Sing with Me (1992)	Georgia Hubley, Ira Kaplan
1992	"Swing for Life"	May I Sing with Me (1992); Prisoners of Love (2005)	Georgia Hubley, Ira Kaplan
1992	"Some Kinda Fatigue"	May I Sing with Me (1992); Genius + Love = Yo La Tengo (1996)	Ira Kaplan
1992	"Always Something"	May I Sing with Me (1992)	Georgia Hubley, Ira Kaplan
1992	"86-Second Blowout"	May I Sing with Me (1992)	Ira Kaplan
1992	"Out the Window"	May I Sing with Me (1992)	Ira Kaplan
1992	"Satellite"	May I Sing with Me (1992)	Ira Kaplan
1992	"Sleeping Pill"	May I Sing with Me (1992); Extra Painful (1994) (Live)	Georgia Hubley, Ira Kaplan, James McNew
1992	"Upside-Down One More Time"	Upside-Down CD EP (1992)	Ira Kaplan
1992	"Sunsquashed"	Upside-Down CD EP (1992); Genius + Love = Yo La Tengo (1996)	Georgia Hubley, Ira Kaplan, James McNew
1993	"Big Day Coming" [Slow Version]	Painful (1993); Extra Painful (1994) (Live Acoustic)	Ira Kaplan
1993	"From a Motel 6"	Painful (1993); "From a Motel 6" CD single (1993); Extra Painful (1994) (Live Acoustic); Prisoners of Love (2005)	Georgia Hubley, Ira Kaplan
1993	"Superstar-Watcher"	Painful (1993); Extra Painful (1994) (Live)	Georgia Hubley, Ira Kaplan, James McNew
1993	"I Was the Fool Beside You for Too Long"	Painful (1993); Extra Painful (1994) (Live)	Georgia Hubley, Ira Kaplan, James McNew
1993	"Nowhere Near"	Painful(1993); Extra Painful (1994) (Demo & Live)	Georgia Hubley
1993	"Sudden Organ"	Painful(1993); Extra Painful (1994) (Demo & Live)	Ira Kaplan
1993	"Double Dare"	Painful(1993); Extra Painful (1994) (Demo)	Ira Kaplan
1993	"A Worrying Thing"	Painful(1993); Extra Painful (1994) (Demo)	Ira Kaplan
1993	"Big Day Coming" [Fast Version]	Painful (1993); "Big Day Coming" 7" (1993); Prisoners of Love (2005); Extra Painful (1994) (Live); A Smattering of Outtakes and Rarities (2005) [Demo]	Ira Kaplan
1993	"I Heard You Looking"	Painful (1993); Extra Painful (1994) (Live); Prisoners of Love (2005)	Georgia Hubley, Ira Kaplan, James McNew
1993	"Shaker"	"Shaker" 7" (1993); "Shaker" CD single (1993); Extra Painful (1994) (Live); Prisoners of Love (2005)	Georgia Hubley, Ira Kaplan, James McNew
1993	"What She Wants"	"Shaker" CD single (1993); Extra Painful (1994) (Live)	Georgia Hubley, Ira Kaplan, James McNew
1993	"Double Dare (Sominextraction)"	"Big Day Coming" 7" (1993); Extra Painful (1994) (Live)	Ira Kaplan
1994	"Nutricia"	"From a Motel 6" CD single (1994); Extra Painful (1994) (Live); Genius + Love = Yo La Tengo (1996)	Georgia Hubley, Ira Kaplan, James McNew
1994	"From a Motel 6 (Remix)"	"From a Motel 6" CD single (1994)	Ira Kaplan
1994	"Tunnel Vision	Extra Painful (1994)	Yo La Tengo
1994	"Smart Window	Extra Painful (1994)	Yo La Tengo
1994	"Slow Learner	Extra Painful (1994)	Yo La Tengo
1995	"Regular Life"	Lo-Fi ~ Electric Acoustic & Radical (1995)	Georgia Hubley, Ira Kaplan, James McNew, Jad Fair
1995	"Decora"	Electr-O-Pura (1995)	Georgia Hubley, Ira Kaplan, James McNew
1995	"Flying Lesson (Hot Chicken #1)"	Electr-O-Pura (1995)	Georgia Hubley, Ira Kaplan, James McNew
1995	"The Hour Grows Late"	Electr-O-Pura (1995)	Georgia Hubley, Ira Kaplan, James McNew
1995	"Tom Courtenay"	Electr-O-Pura (1995); Camp Yo La Tengo CD EP (1995); Camp Yo La Tengo 7" (1995); "Tom Courtenay" 7" (1995); Tom Courtenay CD EP (1995); Prisoners of Love (2005); A Smattering of Outtakes and Rarities (2005) [Live Acoustic]	Georgia Hubley, Ira Kaplan, James McNew
1995	"False Ending"	Electr-O-Pura (1995)	Georgia Hubley, Ira Kaplan, James McNew
1995	"Pablo and Andrea"	Electr-O-Pura (1995); Prisoners of Love (2005)	Georgia Hubley, Ira Kaplan, James McNew
1995	"Paul Is Dead"	Electr-O-Pura (1995)	Georgia Hubley, Ira Kaplan, James McNew
1995	"False Alarm"	Electr-O-Pura (1995)	Georgia Hubley, Ira Kaplan, James McNew
1995	"The Ballad of Red Buckets"	Electr-O-Pura (1995)	Georgia Hubley, Ira Kaplan, James McNew
1995	"(Straight Down to the) Bitter End"	Electr-O-Pura (1995)	Georgia Hubley, Ira Kaplan, James McNew
1995	"My Heart's Reflection"	Electr-O-Pura (1995)	Georgia Hubley, Ira Kaplan, James McNew
1995	"Don't Say a Word (Hot Chicken #2)"	Electr-O-Pura (1995); What's Up Matador (Demo) (1997)	Georgia Hubley, Ira Kaplan, James McNew
1995	"Attack on Love"	Electr-O-Pura (1995); The Lounge Ax Defense and Relocation Compact Disc (Live) (1996)	Georgia Hubley, Ira Kaplan, James McNew
1995	"Blue Line Swinger"	Electr-O-Pura (1995); Camp Yo La Tengo CD EP (1995) [Remix, Edit]; Prisoners of Love (2005)	Georgia Hubley, Ira Kaplan, James McNew
1995	"(Thin) Blue Line Swinger"	Camp Yo La Tengo 7" (1995)	Georgia Hubley, Ira Kaplan, James McNew
1995	"Mr. Ameche Plays the Stranger"	Camp Yo La Tengo CD EP (1995); A Smattering of Outtakes and Rarities (2005)	Georgia Hubley, Ira Kaplan, James McNew
1995	"Treading Water"	Tom Courtenay CD EP (1995)	Georgia Hubley, Ira Kaplan, James McNew
1995	"Bad Politics"	Tom Courtenay CD EP (1995)	Georgia Hubley, Ira Kaplan, James McNew
1995	"My Heart's Reflection (Take 3)"	Tom Courtenay CD EP (1995)	Georgia Hubley, Ira Kaplan, James McNew
1995	"The Bisexual Boogie"	"Tom Courtenay" 7" (1995)	Georgia Hubley, Ira Kaplan, James McNew
1996	"Blue/Green Arrow"	"Blue/Green Arrow" 7" (1996); A Smattering of Outtakes and Rarities (2005)	Georgia Hubley, Ira Kaplan, James McNew
1996	"Watching the Sun Rise or Johnny Carson"	"Blue/Green Arrow" 7" (1996)	Georgia Hubley, Ira Kaplan, James McNew
1996	"Evanescent Psychic Pez Drop"	7" split with Stereolab (1996); Genius + Love = Yo La Tengo (1996)	Ira Kaplan, James McNew
1996	"Demons"	I Shot Andy Warhol soundtrack (1996); Genius + Love = Yo La Tengo (1996)	Georgia Hubley, Ira Kaplan
1996	"Something to Do"	Genius + Love = Yo La Tengo (1996)	Ira Kaplan
1996	"Ultra-Powerful Short Wave Radio Picks Up Music from Venus"	Genius + Love = Yo La Tengo (1996)	David Fair, Georgia Hubley, Ira Kaplan, James McNew
1996	"Up to You"	Genius + Love = Yo La Tengo (1996)	Georgia Hubley, Ira Kaplan, James McNew
1996	"Her Grandmother's Gift"	Genius + Love = Yo La Tengo (1996)	Georgia Hubley, Ira Kaplan
1996	"From a Motel 6 #2"	Genius + Love = Yo La Tengo (1996)	Georgia Hubley, Ira Kaplan
1996	"Gooseneck Problem"	Genius + Love = Yo La Tengo (1996)	Ira Kaplan
1996	"Ecstasy Blues"	Genius + Love = Yo La Tengo (1996)	Georgia Hubley, Ira Kaplan, James McNew
1996	"Too Much, Part I"	Genius + Love = Yo La Tengo (1996)	Georgia Hubley, Ira Kaplan
1996	"One Self: Fish Girl"	Genius + Love = Yo La Tengo (1996)	Georgia Hubley, Ira Kaplan
1996	"Enough"	Genius + Love = Yo La Tengo (1996)	Georgia Hubley, Ira Kaplan
1996	"Drum Solo"	Genius + Love = Yo La Tengo (1996)	Georgia Hubley
1996	"From a Motel 6 #1"	Genius + Love = Yo La Tengo (1996)	Georgia Hubley, Ira Kaplan
1996	"Too Much, Part II"	Genius + Love = Yo La Tengo (1996)	Georgia Hubley, Ira Kaplan
1997	"Return to Hot Chicken"	I Can Hear the Heart Beating as One (1997)	Georgia Hubley, Ira Kaplan, James McNew
1997	"Moby Octopad"	I Can Hear the Heart Beating as One (1997)	Georgia Hubley, Ira Kaplan, James McNew
1997	"Sugarcube"	I Can Hear the Heart Beating as One (1997); "Sugarcube" 7" (1997); "Everything is Nice: Matador Records 10th Anniversary Anthology" (Live) (1999); Prisoners of Love (2005)	Georgia Hubley, Ira Kaplan, James McNew
1997	"Damage"	I Can Hear the Heart Beating as One (1997)	Georgia Hubley, Ira Kaplan, James McNew
1997	"Deeper Into Movies"	I Can Hear the Heart Beating as One (1997)	Georgia Hubley, Ira Kaplan, James McNew
1997	"Shadows"	I Can Hear the Heart Beating as One (1997)	Georgia Hubley, Ira Kaplan, James McNew
1997	"Stockholm Syndrome"	I Can Hear the Heart Beating as One (1997); Prisoners of Love (2005)	Georgia Hubley, Ira Kaplan, James McNew
1997	"Autumn Sweater"	I Can Hear the Heart Beating as One (1997); Autumn Sweater EP (1997); Prisoners of Love (2005)	Georgia Hubley, Ira Kaplan, James McNew
1997	"Green Arrow"	I Can Hear the Heart Beating as One (1997)	Georgia Hubley, Ira Kaplan, James McNew
1997	"One PM Again"	I Can Hear the Heart Beating as One (1997)	Georgia Hubley, Ira Kaplan, James McNew
1997	"The Lie and How We Told It"	I Can Hear the Heart Beating as One (1997)	Georgia Hubley, Ira Kaplan, James McNew
1997	"Center of Gravity"	I Can Hear the Heart Beating as One (1997)	Georgia Hubley, Ira Kaplan, James McNew
1997	"Spec Bebop"	I Can Hear the Heart Beating as One (1997)	Georgia Hubley, Ira Kaplan, James McNew
1997	"We're an American Band"	I Can Hear the Heart Beating as One (1997)	Georgia Hubley, Ira Kaplan, James McNew
1997	"Rocket #9 (Long Version)"	"Rocket #9" 7" (1997)	Georgia Hubley, Ira Kaplan, James McNew
1997	"Wig-Out with Charley Dapper"	"Rocket #9" 7" (1997)	Georgia Hubley, Ira Kaplan, James McNew
1997	"Rocket #9 (Short Version)"	"Rocket #9" 7" (1997)	Georgia Hubley, Ira Kaplan, James McNew
1997	"Busy with Me Thoughts"	"Sugarcube" 7" (1997)	Georgia Hubley, Ira Kaplan, James McNew
1997	"3D"	"Spooky Sounds" (1997)	Georgia Hubley, Ira Kaplan, James McNew
1998	"Looney Tunes"	"Little Honda" CD EP (1998)	Georgia Hubley, Ira Kaplan, James McNew
1998	"Urban Crusher"	"Urban Crusher" 7" (1998)	Georgia Hubley, Ira Kaplan, James McNew
1999	"Turtle Soup 1"	"The Book of Life" (1999)	Georgia Hubley, Ira Kaplan, James McNew
1999	"Turtle Soup 2"	"The Book of Life" (1999)	Georgia Hubley, Ira Kaplan, James McNew
2000	"Everyday"	And Then Nothing Turned Itself Inside-Out (2000)	Georgia Hubley, Ira Kaplan, James McNew
2000	"Our Way to Fall"	And Then Nothing Turned Itself Inside-Out (2000); All Tomorrow's Parties (Live) (2001); Prisoners of Love (2005)	Georgia Hubley, Ira Kaplan, James McNew
2000	"Saturday"	And Then Nothing Turned Itself Inside-Out (2000); "Saturday" CD single and 10" (2000)	Georgia Hubley, Ira Kaplan, James McNew
2000	"Let's Save Tony Orlando's House"	And Then Nothing Turned Itself Inside-Out (2000)	Georgia Hubley, Ira Kaplan, James McNew
2000	"Last Days of Disco"	And Then Nothing Turned Itself Inside-Out (2000)	Georgia Hubley, Ira Kaplan, James McNew
2000	"The Crying of Lot G"	And Then Nothing Turned Itself Inside-Out (2000)	Georgia Hubley, Ira Kaplan, James McNew
2000	"Tears Are in Your Eyes"	And Then Nothing Turned Itself Inside-Out (2000); Prisoners of Love (2005)	Georgia Hubley, Ira Kaplan, James McNew
2000	"Cherry Chapstick"	And Then Nothing Turned Itself Inside-Out (2000); Today Is the Day! CD and 12" EP (2003) [Live]	Georgia Hubley, Ira Kaplan, James McNew
2000	"From Black to Blue"	And Then Nothing Turned Itself Inside-Out (2000)	Georgia Hubley, Ira Kaplan, James McNew
2000	"Madeline"	And Then Nothing Turned Itself Inside-Out (2000)	Georgia Hubley, Ira Kaplan, James McNew
2000	"Tired Hippo"	And Then Nothing Turned Itself Inside-Out (2000)	Georgia Hubley, Ira Kaplan, James McNew
2000	"Night Falls on Hoboken"	And Then Nothing Turned Itself Inside-Out (2000)	Georgia Hubley, Ira Kaplan, James McNew
2000	"Danelectro 3"	Danelectro CD and 12" EP (2000); "Saturday" CD and 10" single (2000)	Georgia Hubley, Ira Kaplan, James McNew
2000	"Danelectro 2"	Danelectro CD and 12" EP (2000); "Saturday" CD and 10" single (2000)	Georgia Hubley, Ira Kaplan, James McNew
2000	"Danelectro 1"	Danelectro CD and 12" EP (2000)	Georgia Hubley, Ira Kaplan, James McNew
2002	"Sea Urchins"	The Sounds of the Sounds of Science (2002)	Georgia Hubley, Ira Kaplan, James McNew
2002	"Hyas and Stenorhynchus"	The Sounds of the Sounds of Science (2002)	Georgia Hubley, Ira Kaplan, James McNew
2002	"Shrimp Stories"	The Sounds of the Sounds of Science (2002)	Georgia Hubley, Ira Kaplan, James McNew
2002	"How Some Jellyfish Are Born"	The Sounds of the Sounds of Science (2002)	Georgia Hubley, Ira Kaplan, James McNew
2002	"Liquid Crystals"	The Sounds of the Sounds of Science (2002)	Georgia Hubley, Ira Kaplan, James McNew
2002	"The Love Life of the Octopus"	The Sounds of the Sounds of Science (2002)	Georgia Hubley, Ira Kaplan, James McNew
2002	"Acera or the Wtiches' Dance"	The Sounds of the Sounds of Science (2002)	Georgia Hubley, Ira Kaplan, James McNew
2002	"The Sea Horse"	The Sounds of the Sounds of Science (2002)	Georgia Hubley, Ira Kaplan, James McNew
2003	"Beach Party Tonight"	Summer Sun (2003)	Georgia Hubley, Ira Kaplan, James McNew
2003	"Little Eyes"	Summer Sun (2003); Prisoners of Love (2005)	Georgia Hubley, Ira Kaplan, James McNew
2003	"Nothing But You and Me"	Summer Sun (2003)	Georgia Hubley, Ira Kaplan, James McNew
2003	"Season of the Shark"	Summer Sun (2003); Prisoners of Love (2005)	Georgia Hubley, Ira Kaplan, James McNew
2003	"Today Is the Day"	Summer Sun (2003); Today Is the Day! CD and 12" EP (2003) [Rock Version]	Georgia Hubley, Ira Kaplan, James McNew
2003	"Tiny Birds"	Summer Sun (2003)	Georgia Hubley, Ira Kaplan, James McNew
2003	"How to Make a Baby Elephant Float"	Summer Sun (2003)	Georgia Hubley, Ira Kaplan, James McNew
2003	"Georgia Vs. Yo La Tengo"	Summer Sun (2003)	Georgia Hubley, Ira Kaplan, James McNew
2003	"Don't Have to Be So Sad"	Summer Sun (2003)	Georgia Hubley, Ira Kaplan, James McNew
2003	"Winter A-Go-Go"	Summer Sun (2003)	Georgia Hubley, Ira Kaplan, James McNew
2003	"Moonrock Mambo"	Summer Sun (2003)	Georgia Hubley, Ira Kaplan, James McNew
2003	"Let's Be Still"	Summer Sun (2003)	Georgia Hubley, Ira Kaplan, James McNew
2003	"Styles of the Times"	Today Is the Day! EP (2003)	Georgia Hubley, Ira Kaplan, James McNew
2003	"Outsmartener"	Today Is the Day! EP (2003)	Georgia Hubley, Ira Kaplan, James McNew
2003	"Dr. Crash"	Today Is the Day! EP (2003)	Georgia Hubley, Ira Kaplan, James McNew
2005	"Stay Away from Heaven"	A Smattering of Outtakes and Rarities (2005)	Georgia Hubley, Ira Kaplan, James McNew
2005	"Pencil Test"	A Smattering of Outtakes and Rarities (2005)	Georgia Hubley, Ira Kaplan, James McNew
2005	"Almost True"	A Smattering of Outtakes and Rarities (2005)	Georgia Hubley, Ira Kaplan, James McNew
2005	"Weather Shy"	A Smattering of Outtakes and Rarities (2005)	Georgia Hubley, Ira Kaplan, James McNew
2006	"Pass the Hatchet, I Think I'm Goodkind"	I Am Not Afraid of You and I Will Beat Your Ass (2006)	Georgia Hubley, Ira Kaplan, James McNew
2006	"Beanbag Chair"	I Am Not Afraid of You and I Will Beat Your Ass (2006)	Georgia Hubley, Ira Kaplan, James McNew
2006	"I Feel Like Going Home"	I Am Not Afraid of You and I Will Beat Your Ass (2006)	Georgia Hubley, Ira Kaplan, James McNew
2006	"Mr. Tough"	I Am Not Afraid of You and I Will Beat Your Ass (2006); "Mr. Tough" 7" (2006)	Georgia Hubley, Ira Kaplan, James McNew
2006	"Black Flowers"	I Am Not Afraid of You and I Will Beat Your Ass (2006)	Georgia Hubley, Ira Kaplan, James McNew
2006	"The Race Is on Again"	I Am Not Afraid of You and I Will Beat Your Ass (2006)	Georgia Hubley, Ira Kaplan, James McNew
2006	"The Room Got Heavy"	I Am Not Afraid of You and I Will Beat Your Ass (2006)	Georgia Hubley, Ira Kaplan, James McNew
2006	"Sometimes I Don't Get You"	I Am Not Afraid of You and I Will Beat Your Ass (2006)	Georgia Hubley, Ira Kaplan, James McNew
2006	"Daphnia"	I Am Not Afraid of You and I Will Beat Your Ass (2006)	Georgia Hubley, Ira Kaplan, James McNew
2006	"I Should Have Known Better"	I Am Not Afraid of You and I Will Beat Your Ass (2006)	Georgia Hubley, Ira Kaplan, James McNew
2006	"The Weakest Part"	I Am Not Afraid of You and I Will Beat Your Ass (2006)	Georgia Hubley, Ira Kaplan, James McNew
2006	"Song for Mahila"	I Am Not Afraid of You and I Will Beat Your Ass (2006)	Georgia Hubley, Ira Kaplan, James McNew
2006	"Point and Shoot"	I Am Not Afraid of You and I Will Beat Your Ass (2006)	Georgia Hubley, Ira Kaplan, James McNew
2006	"The Story of Yo La Tango"	I Am Not Afraid of You and I Will Beat Your Ass (2006)	Georgia Hubley, Ira Kaplan, James McNew
2006	"Watch Out for Me Ronnie"	I Am Not Afraid of You and I Will Beat Your Ass (2006); Popular Songs iTunes (2009) (Live at Primavera 2009)	Georgia Hubley, Ira Kaplan, James McNew
2007	"El Es Gay" (Live)	Live Session (2007)	Georgia Hubley, Ira Kaplan, James McNew
2007	"Pass the Hatchet, I Think I'm Goodkind" (Live)	Live Session (2007)	Georgia Hubley, Ira Kaplan, James McNew
2007	"The Weakest Part" (Live)	Live Session (2007)	Georgia Hubley, Ira Kaplan, James McNew
2007	"Luci Baines" (Live)	Live Session (2007)	Georgia Hubley, Ira Kaplan, James McNew
2008	"Leaving Home"	They Shoot, We Score (2008)	Georgia Hubley, Ira Kaplan, James McNew
2008	"Getting Lost"	They Shoot, We Score (2008)	Georgia Hubley, Ira Kaplan, James McNew
2008	"Path to Springs"	They Shoot, We Score (2008)	Georgia Hubley, Ira Kaplan, James McNew
2008	"Driving Home"	They Shoot, We Score (2008)	Georgia Hubley, Ira Kaplan, James McNew
2008	"Leaving Home (Alternate Version)"	They Shoot, We Score (2008)	Georgia Hubley, Ira Kaplan, James McNew
2008	"Old Joy: End Credits"	They Shoot, We Score (2008)	Georgia Hubley, Ira Kaplan, James McNew
2008	"Ashley"	They Shoot, We Score (2008)	Georgia Hubley, Ira Kaplan, James McNew
2008	"Meerkats"	They Shoot, We Score (2008)	Georgia Hubley, Ira Kaplan, James McNew
2008	"Madeline" [2]	They Shoot, We Score (2008)	Georgia Hubley, Ira Kaplan, James McNew
2008	"A Roomful of Ladies" (Outtake)	They Shoot, We Score (2008)	Georgia Hubley, Ira Kaplan, James McNew
2008	"David Wark"	They Shoot, We Score (2008)	Georgia Hubley, Ira Kaplan, James McNew
2008	"Aftermath" (Outtake)	They Shoot, We Score (2008)	Georgia Hubley, Ira Kaplan, James McNew
2008	"George"	They Shoot, We Score (2008)	Georgia Hubley, Ira Kaplan, James McNew
2008	"This Could Be It"	They Shoot, We Score (2008)	Georgia Hubley, Ira Kaplan, James McNew
2008	"The Phantom Who Haunts Broadway"	They Shoot, We Score (2008)	Georgia Hubley, Ira Kaplan, James McNew
2008	"Game Time"	They Shoot, We Score (2008)	Georgia Hubley, Ira Kaplan, James McNew
2008	"Pharaoh Blues"	They Shoot, We Score (2008)	Georgia Hubley, Ira Kaplan, James McNew
2008	"Zoo Chant"	They Shoot, We Score (2008)	Georgia Hubley, Ira Kaplan, James McNew
2008	"Love Chant"	They Shoot, We Score (2008)	Georgia Hubley, Ira Kaplan, James McNew
2008	"Asbestos"	They Shoot, We Score (2008)	Georgia Hubley, Ira Kaplan, James McNew
2008	"Return of the Pharaoh"	They Shoot, We Score (2008)	Georgia Hubley, Ira Kaplan, James McNew
2008	"Spec Bebop" (Shorter Version)	They Shoot, We Score (2008)	Georgia Hubley, Ira Kaplan, James McNew
2008	"Buckner's Boner"	They Shoot, We Score (2008)	Georgia Hubley, Ira Kaplan, James McNew
2008	"Isolation Tank"	They Shoot, We Score (2008)	Georgia Hubley, Ira Kaplan, James McNew
2008	"Panic in Central Park (Outtake)"	They Shoot, We Score (2008)	Georgia Hubley, Ira Kaplan, James McNew
2008	"Panic in Central Park"	They Shoot, We Score (2008)	Georgia Hubley, Ira Kaplan, James McNew
2008	"Wizard's Sleeve"	They Shoot, We Score (2008)	Georgia Hubley, Ira Kaplan, James McNew
2009	"Here to Fall"	Here to Fall 12" (2009); Here to Fall 7" (2009) (Pete Rock Remix); Popular Songs (2009)	Georgia Hubley, Ira Kaplan, James McNew
2009	"Avalon or Someone Very Similar"	Popular Songs (2009)	Georgia Hubley, Ira Kaplan, James McNew
2009	"By Two's"	Popular Songs (2009)	Georgia Hubley, Ira Kaplan, James McNew
2009	"If It's True"	Popular Songs (2009)	Georgia Hubley, Ira Kaplan, James McNew
2009	"I'm On My Way"	Popular Songs (2009)	Georgia Hubley, Ira Kaplan, James McNew
2009	"When It's Dark"	Popular Songs (2009)	Georgia Hubley, Ira Kaplan, James McNew
2009	"All Your Secrets"	Popular Songs (2009)	Georgia Hubley, Ira Kaplan, James McNew
2009	"More Stars Than There Are in Heaven"	Popular Songs (2009)	Georgia Hubley, Ira Kaplan, James McNew
2009	"The Fireside"	Popular Songs (2009)	Georgia Hubley, Ira Kaplan, James McNew
2009	"And the Glitter Is Gone"	Popular Songs (2009)	Georgia Hubley, Ira Kaplan, James McNew
2009	"Nothing to Hide"	Popular Songs (2009); Popular Songs Buy Early Get Now (2009) (Demo)	Georgia Hubley, Ira Kaplan, James McNew
2009	"Periodically Double or Triple"	Periodically Double or Triple 7" (2009); Popular Songs (2009); Popular Songs Buy Early Get Now (2009) (Demo)	Georgia Hubley, Ira Kaplan, James McNew
2012	"Big Fish" (With the Lost City Ramblers)	Occupy This Album (2012)	Georgia Hubley, Ira Kaplan, James McNew
2013	"Ohm"	Fade (2013); Fade Deluxe Edition CD - Fade out (2013) (Live)	Georgia Hubley, Ira Kaplan, James McNew
2013	"Is That Enough"	Fade (2013); Fade Deluxe Edition CD - Fade out (2013) (Live)	Georgia Hubley, Ira Kaplan, James McNew
2013	"Two Trains"	Fade (2013); Fade Deluxe Edition CD - Fade out (2013) (Demo)	Georgia Hubley, Ira Kaplan, James McNew
2013	"Cornelia and Jane"	Fade (2013); Fade Deluxe Edition CD - Fade out (2013) (Instrumental)	Georgia Hubley, Ira Kaplan, James McNew
2013	"Stupid Things"	Stupid Things 12" (2013); Fade (2013); Fade Deluxe Edition CD - Fade out (2013) (Instrumental)	Georgia Hubley, Ira Kaplan, James McNew
2013	"Well You Better"	Fade (2013)	Georgia Hubley, Ira Kaplan, James McNew
2013	"Paddle Forward"	Fade (2013)	Georgia Hubley, Ira Kaplan, James McNew
2013	"I'll Be Around"	Fade (2013)	Georgia Hubley, Ira Kaplan, James McNew
2013	"The Point of It"	Fade (2013)	Georgia Hubley, Ira Kaplan, James McNew
2013	"Before We Run"	Fade (2013); Matador 2013 (Live at KEXP) (2013)	Georgia Hubley, Ira Kaplan, James McNew
2013	"Super Kiwi"	Super Kiwi 7" (2013); Fade Deluxe Edition CD - Fade out (2013)	Georgia Hubley, Ira Kaplan, James McNew
2013	"Note to self"	Fade Deluxe Edition CD - Fade out (2013)	Georgia Hubley, Ira Kaplan, James McNew
2013	"Oriole"	Fade Deluxe Edition CD - Fade out (2013); Ohm 12" (2013)	Georgia Hubley, Ira Kaplan, James McNew
2015	"Rickety"	Stuff Like That There (2015)	Georgia Hubley, Ira Kaplan, James McNew
2015	"All Your Secrets"	Stuff Like That There (2015)	Georgia Hubley, Ira Kaplan, James McNew
2015	"The Ballad of Red Buckets"	Stuff Like That There (2015)	Georgia Hubley, Ira Kaplan, James McNew
2015	"Awhileaway"	Stuff Like That There (2015)	Georgia Hubley, Ira Kaplan, James McNew
2015	"Deeper Into Movies"	Stuff Like That There (2015)	Georgia Hubley, Ira Kaplan, James McNew
2015	"Suspirica"	Fifty at 50 (2015)	Georgia Hubley, Ira Kaplan, James McNew
2019	"Eight Candles"	Hanukkah+	Sam Elwitt

=== Covers ===
Year	Title	Available on	Written by
1985	"A House Is Not a Motel"	"The River of Water" 7" (1985); Ride the Tiger reissue (1993, 1996)	Arthur Lee
1986	"Big Sky"	Ride the Tiger (1986)	Ray Davies
1986	"The Empty Pool"	Ride the Tiger (1986)	Dave Weckerman
1986	"Living in the Country"	Ride the Tiger (1986)	Pete Seeger
1986	"Closing Time"	Ride the Tiger reissue (1993, 1996)	Sammy Walker
1986	"Heart's Expired"	For Your Ears Only - A Jersey Beat Compilation Vol.2 (1986)	Will Rigby
1987	"It's Alright (The Way That You Live)"	New Wave Hot Dogs reissue (1987)	Lou Reed
1987	"Let's Compromise"	New Wave Hot Dogs reissue (1987)	Information
1987	"For the Turnstiles"	"The Asparagus Song" 7" (1987)	Neil Young
1987	"Orange Songs"	President Yo La Tengo (1989)	Tara Key, Tim Harris
1987	"I Threw It All Away"	President Yo La Tengo (1989)	Bob Dylan
1990	"Griselda"	Fakebook (1990)	Antonio Apodeca
1990	"Here Comes My Baby"	Fakebook (1990)	Cat Stevens
1990	"Yellow Sarong"	Fakebook (1990)	The Scene Is Now
1990	"You Tore Me Down"	Fakebook (1990)	Chris Wilson, Cyril Jordan
1990	"Emulsified"	Fakebook (1990)	Rex Garvin
1990	"Speeding Motorcycle" (With Daniel Johnston)	Fakebook (1990); Genius + Love = Yo La Tengo (1996)	Daniel Johnston
1990	"Casper the Friendly Ghost" (With Daniel Johnston)	The Daniel Johnston Hour (1990)	Daniel Johnston
1990	"Whispering Hope" (With Daniel Johnston)	The Daniel Johnston Hour (1990)	Daniel Johnston
1990	"Tried So Hard"	Fakebook (1990)	Gene Clark
1990	"Oklahoma, U.S.A."	Fakebook (1990)	Ray Davies
1990	"The One to Cry"	Fakebook (1990)	The Escorts
1990	"Andalucia"	Fakebook (1990)	John Cale
1990	"What Can I Say"	Fakebook (1990)	Joey Spampinato
1990	"Cast a Shadow"	"Walking Away from You" 7" (1991); Genius + Love = Yo La Tengo (1996)	Beat Happening
1992	"(The) Farmer's Daughter"	Upside-Down CD EP (1992)	The Beach Boys
1992	"Out of Control"	Upside-Down CD EP (1992)	Channel 3
1992	"Dreaming"	Freedom of Choice: Yesterday's New Wave Hits Compilation (1992)	Blondie
1993	"The Whole of the Law"	Painful (1993); Extra Painful (1994) (Loops)	Peter Perrett
1993	"For Shame of Doing Wrong (Slide Version)"	“Shaker” CD single (1993); Extra Painful (1994) (Live)	Richard Thompson
1993	"For Shame of Doing Wrong"	“Shaker” 7" single (1993)	Richard Thompson
1994	"Ashes on the Ground"	"From a Motel 6" CD single (1994); Extra Painful (1994) (Live); A Smattering of Outtakes and Rarities (2005)	David Fair, Mark Jickling
1995	"Can't Seem to Make You Mine"	Camp Yo La Tengo CD EP (1995)	Sky Saxon
1996	"Too Late"	Genius + Love = Yo La Tengo (1996)	Bruce Gilbert
1996	"Hanky Panky Nohow"	Genius + Love = Yo La Tengo (1996)	John Cale
1996	"I'm Set Free"	Genius + Love = Yo La Tengo (1996)	Lou Reed
1996	"Surfin' with the Shah"	Genius + Love = Yo La Tengo (1996)	John Talley-Jones
1996	"Blitzkrieg Bop"	Genius + Love = Yo La Tengo (1996)	Ramones
1997	"Little Honda"	I Can Hear the Heart Beating as One (1997); "Little Honda" CD EP and 7" (1997)	Brian Wilson, Mike Love
1997	"My Little Corner of the World"	I Can Hear the Heart Beating as One (1997)	Bob Hilliard, Lee Pockriss
1997	"Be Thankful for What You Got"	"Little Honda" CD EP (1997)	William DeVaughn
1997	"No Return"	"Little Honda" CD EP (1997)	Ray Davies
1997	"Black Hole"	"Little Honda" CD EP (1997)	Jones
1997	"How Much I've Lied"	"Little Honda" CD EP (1997)	David Rivkin, Gram Parsons
1997	"By the Time It Gets Dark"	"Little Honda" CD EP (1997); Prisoners of Love (2005)	Sandy Denny
1997	"We Are the Champions" (Live)	"Little Honda" CD EP (1997)	Queen
1998	"Run Run Run"	"Urban Crusher" 7" (1998)	Lou Reed
2000	"You Can Have It All"	And Then Nothing Turned Itself Inside-Out (2000); "You Can Have It All" CD single and 7" (2000); Prisoners of Love (2005)	Harry Wayne Casey
2000	"Ready-Mades"	"You Can Have It All" CD single and 7" (2000)	Neil Innes, Vivian Stanshall
2001	"Gun"	The Invisible Circus (2001)	Jeff Tweedy
2002	"Rock N Roll Santa"	Merry Christmas from Yo La Tengo (2002)	Jan Terri
2002	"It's Christmas Time"	Merry Christmas from Yo La Tengo (2002)	Alton Abraham, Sun Ra
2002	"Santa Claus Goes Modern"	Merry Christmas from Yo La Tengo (2002)	Sven Swanson
2002	"Nuclear War"	Nuclear War EP (2002); Prisoners of Love (2005)	Sun Ra
2002	"Fancy"	This Is Where I Belong: The Songs Of Ray Davies & The Kinks Compilation (2002)	Ray Davies
2003	"Take Care"	Summer Sun (2003)	Alex Chilton
2003	"Needle of Death"	Today Is the Day! EP (2003)	Bert Jansch
2003	"Hedwig's Lament/Exquisite Corpse" (With Yoko Ono)	Wig in a Box: Songs from & Inspired by Hedwig and the Angry Inch Compilation (2003)	John Cameron Mitchell, Stephen Trask
2005	"Dreaming"	A Smattering of Outtakes and Rarities (2005)	The Cosmic Rays
2005	"Bad Politics"	A Smattering of Outtakes and Rarities (2005)	The Dead C
2005	"Dreams"	A Smattering of Outtakes and Rarities (2005)	Stevie Nicks
2005	"Magnet"	A Smattering of Outtakes and Rarities (2005)	Joey Spampinato, Terry Adams
2006	"I'm Your Puppet"	"Mr. Tough" 7" (2006)	Dan Penn, Spooner Oldham
2006	"Tighten Up"	Yo La Tengo Is Murdering the Classics (2006)	Archie Bell and the Drells
2006	"The Night Chicago Died"	Yo La Tengo Is Murdering the Classics (2006)	Paper Lace
2006	"Raw Power"	Yo La Tengo Is Murdering the Classics (2006)	The Stooges
2006	"Sea Cruise"	Yo La Tengo Is Murdering the Classics (2006)	Huey "Piano" Smith
2006	"Favorite Thing"	Yo La Tengo Is Murdering the Classics (2006)	The Replacements
2006	"Baseball Altamont"	Yo La Tengo Is Murdering the Classics (2006)	Ned Hayden, Philip Shelley
2006	"Meet the Mets"	Yo La Tengo Is Murdering the Classics (2006)	Bill Katz, Ruth Roberts
2006	"Oh Bondage, Up Yours!"	Yo La Tengo Is Murdering the Classics (2006)	X-Ray Spex
2006	"Ding Dang/Interplanetary Music"	Yo La Tengo Is Murdering the Classics (2006)	Brian Wilson, Roger McGuinn, Sun Ra
2006	"Captain Lou"	Yo La Tengo Is Murdering the Classics (2006)	NRBQ
2006	"Oh! Sweet Nuthin'"	Yo La Tengo Is Murdering the Classics (2006)	The Velvet Underground
2006	"Route 66"	Yo La Tengo Is Murdering the Classics (2006)	Bobby Troup
2006	"Roadrunner"	Yo La Tengo Is Murdering the Classics (2006)	Jonathan Richman
2006	"Tijuana Taxi"	Yo La Tengo Is Murdering the Classics (2006)	Eryan Coleman
2006	"Mendocino/Raindrops Keep Fallin’ on My Head"	Yo La Tengo Is Murdering the Classics (2006)	Doug Sahm, Burt Bacharach
2006	"Sweet Dreams (Are Made of This)"	Yo La Tengo Is Murdering the Classics (2006)	Eurythmics
2006	"Baby's on Fire"	Yo La Tengo Is Murdering the Classics (2006)	Brian Eno
2006	"Mary Anne with the Shaky Hand"	Yo La Tengo Is Murdering the Classics (2006)	The Who
2006	"The Hokey Pokey"	Yo La Tengo Is Murdering the Classics (2006)	Larry Laprise, Taftt Baker, Charles Macak
2006	"You May Be Right"	Yo La Tengo Is Murdering the Classics (2006)	Billy Joel
2006	"Mama Told Me (Not to Come)"	Yo La Tengo Is Murdering the Classics (2006)	Randy Newman
2006	"Roundabout"	Yo La Tengo Is Murdering the Classics (2006)	Yes
2006	"You Ain't Seen Nothing Yet"	Yo La Tengo Is Murdering the Classics (2006)	Bachman-Turner Overdrive
2006	"Don't Worry, Kyoko (Mummy's Only Looking for Her Hand in the Snow)"	Yo La Tengo Is Murdering the Classics (2006)	Yoko Ono
2006	"Downtown"	Yo La Tengo Is Murdering the Classics (2006)	Petula Clark
2006	"Let the Good Times Roll"	Yo La Tengo Is Murdering the Classics (2006)	Shirley Goodman, Leonard Lee
2006	"Never on Sunday"	Yo La Tengo Is Murdering the Classics (2006)	Manos Hadjidakis, Billy Towne
2006	"20th Century Boy"	Yo La Tengo Is Murdering the Classics (2006)	T. Rex
2006	"Rock the Boat"	Yo La Tengo Is Murdering the Classics (2006)	The Hues Corporation
2006	"Shotgun/Medley"	Yo La Tengo Is Murdering the Classics (2006)	Junior Walker and the All-Stars
2007	"Fourth Time Around"	I'm Not There (soundtrack) (2007)	Bob Dylan
2007	"I Wanna Be Your Lover"	I'm Not There (soundtrack) (2007)	Bob Dylan
2009	"Gentle Hour"	Dark Was the Night compilation (2009)	Peter Gutteridge
2009	"What'cha Gonna Do About It"	Fuckbook (2009)	Brian Potter, Ian Samwell
2009	"Accident"	Fuckbook (2009)	Brian McMahon
2009	"This Is Where I Belong"	Fuckbook (2009)	Ray Davies
2009	"Shut Down"	Fuckbook (2009)	Brian Wilson, Roger Christian
2009	"Shut Down Part 2"	Fuckbook (2009)	Carl Wilson
2009	"With a Girl Like You"	Fuckbook (2009)	Reg Presley
2009	"The Kid with the Replaceable Head"	Fuckbook (2009)	Richard Hell
2009	"Dog Meat"	Fuckbook (2009)	Chris Wilson, Cyril Jordan
2009	"So Easy Baby"	Fuckbook (2009)	Billy Miller
2009	"Come On Up"	Fuckbook (2009)	Felix Cavaliere
2009	"Gudbuy T'Jane"	Fuckbook (2009)	Jim Lea, Noddy Holder
2009	"Coloured"	Stroke: Songs for Chris Knox Compilation (2009)	Chris Knox
2009	"You've Got a Friend"	Popular Songs (Japanese CD) (Argentine CD) (2009)	Carole King
2009	"Do They Know It's Christmas?" (With Fucked Up, Ezra Koenig, David Cross, Kevin Drew, Tegan & Sara, Andrew W.K., Bob Mould, Kyp Malone, GZA)	Do They Know It's Christmas? 7" (2009)	Midge Ure, Bob Geldof
2010	"You Make Me Feel Good"	Sweetheart : Our Favorite Artists Sing Their Favorite Love Songs Compilation (2010)	Chris White
2012	"I Saw the Light"	Super Hits Of The Seventies Compilation (2012); Fade (bonus 7") (Deluxe Edition CD - Fade out) (2013)	Todd Rundgren
2013	"Move To California"	Super Kiwi 7" (2013); Fade Deluxe Edition CD - Fade out (2013)	Times New Viking
2013	"A Day in the Life of a Tree"	Super Kiwi 7" (2013); Fade Deluxe Edition CD - Fade out (2013)	Brian Wilson, Jack Rieley
2013	"La Grange"	Fade Deluxe Edition CD - Fade out (2013)	ZZ Top
2014	"Maxwell Snake" (With David Greenberger)	Near the Edge of the Penny Jar Spill (2014)	David Greenberger
2014	"Eight Day Weekend" (With Jeff Tweedy)	Christmas Time Again (2014)	Jeff Tweedy
2015	"My Heart's Not In It"	Stuff Like That There (2015)	Gerry Goffin, Russ Titelman
2015	"I'm So Lonesome I Could Cry"	Stuff Like That There (2015)	Hank Williams
2015	"Friday I'm in Love"	Stuff Like That There (2015)	Cure
2015	"Before We Stopped to Think"	Stuff Like That There (2015)	Great Plains
2015	"Butchie's Tune"	Stuff Like That There (2015)	Steve Boone
2015	"Automatic Doom"	Stuff Like That There (2015)	Dan Cuddy
2015	"I Can Feel the Ice Melting"	Stuff Like That There (2015)	George Clinton, Tamala Lewis
2015	"Naples"	Stuff Like That There (2015)	Tim Harris
2015	"Somebody's in Love"	Stuff Like That There (2015)	Raymond Dancer, Lonnie Tolbert
2016	"Alley Cat"	Murder in the Second Degree (2016)	Frank Bjorn
2016	"New York Groove"	Murder in the Second Degree (2016)	Russ Ballard
2016	"Bertha"	Murder in the Second Degree (2016)	Jerry Garcia, Robert Hunter
2016	"Add It Up"	Murder in the Second Degree (2016)	Gordon Gano
2016	"To Love Somebody"	Murder in the Second Degree (2016)	Bee Gees
2016	"Civilization (Bongo, Bongo, Bongo I Don't Want to Leave the Congo)"	Murder in the Second Degree (2016)	Bob Hilliard, Carl Sigman
2016	"Suspect Device"	Murder in the Second Degree (2016)	Jake Burns
2016	"First I Look At The Purse"	Murder in the Second Degree (2016)	Smokey Robinson, Bobby Rogers
2016	"Jailbreak"	Murder in the Second Degree (2016)	Phil Lynott
2016	"Popcorn"	Murder in the Second Degree (2016)	Gershon Kingsley
2016	"Girl from the North Country"	Murder in the Second Degree (2016)	Bob Dylan
2016	"Build Me Up Buttercup"	Murder in the Second Degree (2016)	Mike d'Abo, Tony Macaulay
2016	"I Wanna Be Free"	Murder in the Second Degree (2016)	Tommy Boyce, Bobby Hart
2016	"Rock and Roll Love Letter"	Murder in the Second Degree (2016)	Tim Moore
2016	"Emotional Rescue"	Murder in the Second Degree (2016)	Mick Jagger, Keith Richards
2016	"Some Velvet Morning"	Murder in the Second Degree (2016)	Lee Hazlewood
2016	"Medley: The Low Spark Of High Heeled Boys/Mr. Soul"	Murder in the Second Degree (2016)	Steve Winwood, Jim Capaldi/Neil Young
2016	"Pay to Cum"	Murder in the Second Degree (2016)	Bad Brains
2016	"Never My Love"	Murder in the Second Degree (2016)	Don Addrisi, Dick Addrisi
2016	"King Kong"	Murder in the Second Degree (2016)	Ray Davies
2016	"White Lines (Don't Don't Do It)"	Murder in the Second Degree (2016)	Melle Mel, Sylvia Robinson
2016	"Slurf Song"	Murder in the Second Degree (2016)	Michael Hurley
2016	"Different Drum"	Murder in the Second Degree (2016)	Mike Nesmith
2016	"Crazy"	Murder in the Second Degree (2016)	Willie Nelson
2016	"Be My Baby"	Murder in the Second Degree (2016)	Phil Spector, Jeff Barry, Ellie Greenwich
2016	"Hey Ya!"	Murder in the Second Degree (2016)	Andre 3000
2016	"Heart of Darkness"	Murder in the Second Degree (2016)	Pere Ubu
2016	"Chantilly Lace/Medley"	Murder in the Second Degree (2016)	Big Bopper
