= Prisoners of Love: A Smattering of Scintillating Senescent Songs: 1985–2003 =

Greatest hits album by Yo La Tengo
- Released: March 22, 2005
- Recorded: 1985–2003
- Genre: Indie rock
- Length: 118:04
- Language: English
- Label: Matador

Yo La Tengo chronology
Summer Sun (2003)	Prisoners of Love: A Smattering of Scintillating Senescent Songs: 1985–2003 (2005)	Yo La Tengo Is Murdering the Classics (2006)

Professional ratings
Review scores
Source	Rating
Allmusic	4.5/5 stars
Pitchfork Media	(8.2/10)

Prisoners of Love: A Smattering of Scintillating Senescent Songs: 1985–2003 is a best-of compilation album of songs by the band Yo La Tengo. It was available in two- or three-disc editions, the third disc being A Smattering of Outtakes and Rarities 1986–2002.

The front and rear cover art is reminiscent of The Beatles' Second Album in style, color and layout of band photographs.

== Track listing ==
All tracks are written by Georgia Hubley, Ira Kaplan, James McNew unless indicated otherwise.

Disc one
No.	Title	Writer(s)	Source	Length
1.	"Shaker"		Shaker EP (1993)	3:20
2.	"Sugarcube"		I Can Hear the Heart Beating as One (1997)	3:22
3.	"Barnaby, Hardly Working"	Hubley, Kaplan	President Yo La Tengo (1989)	4:36
4.	"Little Eyes"		Summer Sun (2003)	4:22
5.	"Stockholm Syndrome"		I Can Hear the Heart Beating as One	2:53
6.	"Our Way to Fall"		And Then Nothing Turned Itself Inside-Out (2000)	4:20
7.	"From a Motel 6"	Hubley, Kaplan	Painful (1993)	4:11
8.	"Swing for Life"	Hubley, Kaplan	May I Sing With Me (1992)	5:16
9.	"Tom Courtenay"		Electr-O-Pura (1995)	3:32
10.	"Lewis"	Kaplan	New Wave Hot Dogs (1987)	2:30
11.	"I Heard You Looking"		Painful	7:02
12.	"You Can Have It All"	Harry Wayne Casey, Richard Finch	And Then Nothing Turned Itself Inside-Out	4:37
13.	"Did I Tell You"	Kaplan	Fakebook (1990)	3:28

Disc two
No.	Title	Writer(s)	Source	Length
1.	"The River of Water"	Kaplan	"The River of Water/A House Is Not a Motel" 7" single (1985)	2:31
2.	"Autumn Sweater"		I Can Hear the Heart Beating as One	5:19
3.	"Big Day Coming"	Kaplan	Painful	4:14
4.	"Pablo and Andrea"		Electr-O-Pura	4:17
5.	"Drug Test"	Kaplan	President Yo La Tengo	4:08
6.	"Season of the Shark"		Summer Sun	4:29
7.	"Upside-Down"	Kaplan	May I Sing With Me	2:41
8.	"The Summer"	Hubley, Kaplan	Fakebook	2:39
9.	"Tears Are in Your Eyes"		And Then Nothing Turned Itself Inside-Out	4:35
10.	"Blue Line Swinger"		Electr-O-Pura	9:30
11.	"The Story of Jazz"	Kaplan	New Wave Hot Dogs	3:35
12.	"Nuclear War (version 1)"	Sun Ra	Nuclear War EP (2002)	7:35
13.	"By the Time It Gets Dark"	Sandy Denny	Little Honda EP (1997)	3:02

A Smattering of Outtakes and Rarities 1986–2002

As indicated by its title, these songs are outtakes and rarities. (*) Indicates the track was previously unreleased.

Disc three
No.	Title	Writer(s)	Source	Length
1.	"Stay Away from Heaven"		The film The Invisible Circus (2001)	4:31
2.	"Pencil Test" (*)		I Can Hear the Heart Beating as One outtake (1996)	3:39
3.	"Almost True" (*)		And Then Nothing Turned Itself Inside-Out outtake (1999)	3:05
4.	"Tom Courtenay (acoustic version)"		Camp Yo La Tengo EP (1995)	3:13
5.	"Big Day Coming (demo)" (*)	Kaplan	previously unreleased (1992)	3:43
6.	"Dreaming" (*)	Sun Ra, Charles Orio, Calvin Barron	previously unreleased The Cosmic Rays cover (1999)	3:37
7.	"Bad Politics"	Bruce Russell	"Tom Courtenay" single (1994)	2:59
8.	"Blue-Green Arrow"		Earworm 7" (1996)	5:42
9.	"Decora" (acoustic)" (*)		KCRW Morning Becomes Eclectic session (1995)	3:06
10.	"Out the Window (original version)"		That Is Yo La Tengo EP (1991)	4:16
11.	"Weather Shy"		The film The Invisible Circus	4:54
12.	"Dreams" (Fleetwood Mac cover)	Stevie Nicks	7" single with Chemical Imbalance magazine (1986)	4:47
13.	"Autumn Sweater (Kevin Shields remix)"		Autumn Sweater EP (1997)	8:42
14.	"Ashes on the Ground"	David Fair, Mark Jickling	From a Motel 6 EP (1993)	5:15
15.	"Mr. Ameche Plays the Stranger"		Camp Yo La Tengo EP	9:19
16.	"Magnet"	Joey Spampinato, Terry Adams	NRBQ tribute album The Q People (2004)	4:10

== Personnel ==
Yo La Tengo

- Ira Kaplan – vocals, guitar, organ
- Georgia Hubley – vocals, drums, organ
- James McNew – bass, vocals (except as noted below)
- Stephan Wichnewski – bass (disc 1: track 10, disc 2: track 11)
- Dave Schramm – guitar (disc 1: track 13, disc 2: tracks 1 & 8)
- Dave Rick – bass (disc 2: track 1), lead guitar (disc 3: track 12)

Additional musicians

- Gene Holder – bass (disc 1: tracks 3 & 8, disc 2: tracks 5 & 8, disc 3: track 10)
- Chris Stamey – guitar (disc 1: track 10)
- David Henry – cello (disc 1: track 12, disc 3: track 3)
- Al Greller – upright bass (disc 1: track 13)
- Mike Tchang – saxophone (disc 2: track 1)
- Chris Nelson – trombone (disc 2: track 1)
- Roger Moutenot – bongos (disc 2: track 2)
- Gary Larson trumpet – trumpet (disc 3: track 3)
- Steve Michener – bass (disc 3: track 12)
- Paul Niehaus – pedal steel guitar (disc 3: track 16)
