= Yo La Tengo Is Murdering the Classics =

Compilation album by Yo La Tengo
- Released: 2006
- Recorded: WFMU studios
- Genre: Indie rock
- Length: 66:53
- Label: Egon Records

Yo La Tengo chronology
Prisoners of Love: A Smattering of Scintillating Senescent Songs: 1985-2003 (2005)	Yo La Tengo Is Murdering the Classics (2006)	I Am Not Afraid of You and I Will Beat Your Ass (2006)

Professional ratings
Review scores
Source	Rating
AllMusic	3.5/5 stars
Pitchfork	4.1/10

Yo La Tengo Is Murdering the Classics is an album by the band Yo La Tengo, released in 2006, consisting solely of covers.

Yo La Tengo supports the fundraising efforts of independent radio channel WFMU with annual studio visits. All listeners who pledge money during the band's appearances are offered the chance to request a favorite song that the band would then attempt to perform. This album compiles more than two dozen WFMU highlights first broadcast between 1996 and 2003.

The album cover was created by cartoonist Adrian Tomine.

== Track listing ==
No.	Title	Writer(s)	Length
1.	"Tighten Up"	Archie Bell, Billy Buttler	2:00
2.	"The Night Chicago Died"	Peter Callander, Mitch Murray	2:04
3.	"Raw Power"	Iggy Pop, James Williamson	3:21
4.	"Sea Cruise"	Huey "Piano" Smith	1:46
5.	"Favorite Thing"	Paul Westerberg, Tommy Stinson, Bob Stinson, Chris Mars	1:40
6.	"Baseball Altamont"	The Nightmares	1:31
7.	"Meet the Mets"	Bill Katz, Ruth Roberts	1:47
8.	"Oh Bondage, Up Yours!"	Poly Styrene	1:35
9.	"Ding Dang/Interplanetary Music"	Brian Wilson, Roger McGuinn / Sun Ra	2:35
10.	"Captain Lou"	NRBQ	2:18
11.	"Oh! Sweet Nuthin'"	Lou Reed	1:38
12.	"Route 66"	Bobby Troup	2:18
13.	"Roadrunner"	Jonathan Richman	2:34
14.	"Tijuana Taxi"	Ervan Coleman	0:46
15.	"Mendocino/Raindrops Keep Fallin' on My Head"	Doug Sahm / Burt Bacharach, Hal David	4:13
16.	"Sweet Dreams (Are Made of This)"	Annie Lennox, David A. Stewart	1:33
17.	"Baby's on Fire"	Brian Eno	2:30
18.	"Mary Anne with the Shaky Hand"	Pete Townshend	2:15
19.	"The Hokey Pokey"	Larry Laprise, Taftt Baker, Charles Macak	1:40
20.	"You May Be Right"	Billy Joel	1:49
21.	"Mama Told Me Not to Come"	Randy Newman	2:14
22.	"Roundabout"	Jon Anderson, Steve Howe	2:06
23.	"You Ain't Seen Nothing Yet"	Randy Bachman	1:51
24.	"Don't Worry Kyoko (Mummy's Only Looking for Her Hand in the Snow)"	Yoko Ono	3:20
25.	"Downtown"	Tony Hatch	1:50
26.	"Let the Good Times Roll"	Shirley Goodman, Leonard Lee	1:52
27.	"Never on Sunday"	Manos Hatzidakis	1:12
28.	"20th Century Boy"	Marc Bolan	3:19
29.	"Rock the Boat"	Wally Holmes	1:23
30.	"Shotgun + Medley: Shotgun (Junior Walker); My Sharona (Doug Fieger, Berton Averre); Mr. Apollo (Neil Innes, Vivian Stanshall); Sonic Reducer (Cheetah Chrome, David Thomas); God Only Knows (Wilson, Tony Asher); If and When/The Summer Sun (Chris Stamey); Schizophrenia (Sonic Youth); Another Girl, Another Planet (Peter Perrett); Bedazzled (Peter Cook, Dudley Moore); Wichita Lineman (Jimmy Webb)"		5:53
Total length:			66:53

== Personnel ==
- Georgia Hubley – vocals, drums, keyboards
- Ira Kaplan – vocals, guitar, keyboards
- James McNew – vocals, bass
- Bruce Bennett – guitar, vocals
