= They Shoot, We Score =

Soundtrack album by Yo La Tengo
- Released: September 5, 2008
- Genre: Soundtrack
- Length: 56:13
- Label: Egon Records

Yo La Tengo chronology
I Am Not Afraid of You and I Will Beat Your Ass (2006)	They Shoot, We Score (2008)	Fuckbook (2009)

Professional ratings
Review scores
Source	Rating
Pitchfork	7.3/10

They Shoot, We Score is a compilation soundtrack album by the band Yo La Tengo, released on September 5, 2008.

It contains tracks from the films Old Joy (2006), Junebug (2005), Game 6 (2005) and Shortbus (2006).

"Spec Bebop" is a shortened new recording of the track from I Can Hear the Heart Beating as One and "Ashley" is a new arrangement of "Green Arrow" from the same album. "Madeline" is different from the identically titled track on And Then Nothing Turned Itself Inside Out.

The album was released with different covers using the posters for each of the films as a cover.

== Track listing ==
Old Joy (2006)

1. "Leaving Home" (2:44)
2. "Getting Lost" (3:02)
3. "Path to Springs" (1:30)
4. "Driving Home" (3:48)
5. "Leaving Home (alternate version)" (4:25)
6. "Old Joy: End Credits" (2:48)

Junebug (2005)

7. "Ashley" (1:37)
8. "Meerkat" (0:34)
9. "Madeline" (0:39)
10. "A Roomful of Ladies" (outtake) (1:57)
11. "David Wark" (1:05)
12. "Aftermath (outtake)" (2:08)
13. "George" (0:40)

Game 6 (2005)

14. "This Could Be It" (2:49)
15. "The Phantom Who Haunts Broadway" (0:42)
16. "Game Time" (1:04)
17. "Pharaoh Blues" (2:42)
18. "Zoo Chant" (2:29)
19. "Love Chant" (4:53)
20. "Asbestos" (1:05)
21. "Return of the Pharaoh" (1:31)
22. "Spec Bebop" (3:03)
23. "Buckner's Boner" (2:24)

Shortbus (2006)

24. "Isolation Tank" (2:09)
25. "Panic in Central Park (outtake)" (1:10)
26. "Panic in Central Park" (1:10)
27. "Wizard's Sleeve" (2:05)

== Personnel ==
Yo La Tengo

- Georgia Hubley – drums, keyboards
- Ira Kaplan – guitars, keyboards
- James McNew – bass, keyboards

Additional musicians

- Smokey Hormel – guitar (Old Joy)
- Doug Wieselman – clarinet (Junebug)
- Garo Yellin – cello (Junebug)
- Katie Gentile – violin (Junebug)
- Margaret White – viola (Junebug)
- Amy Kimball – violin (Junebug)
- Dennis Cronin – trumpet (Junebug)
- Sabir Mateen – alto saxophone (Shortbus)
