= I Can Hear the Heart Beating as One =

Studio album by Yo La Tengo
- Released: April 22, 1997
- Studios: House of David in Nashville, Tennessee and Big House and Magic Shop in New York City
- Genres: Indie rock; indie pop; noise pop
- Length: 68:10
- Label: Matador
- Producer: Roger Moutenot

Yo La Tengo chronology
Genius + Love = Yo La Tengo (1996)	I Can Hear the Heart Beating as One (1997)	And Then Nothing Turned Itself Inside-Out (2000)

Singles from I Can Hear the Heart Beating as One
- 1. "Autumn Sweater" Released: April 15, 1997; 2. "Sugarcube" Released: August 4, 1997; 3. "Little Honda" Released: November 17, 1997

I Can Hear the Heart Beating as One is the eighth studio album by the American indie rock band Yo La Tengo, released on April 22, 1997, by Matador Records. It was produced by Roger Moutenot and recorded at House of David in Nashville, Tennessee. The album expands the guitar-based pop of its predecessor Electr-O-Pura to encompass a variety of other music genres, including bossa nova, krautrock, and electronic music. Most of the songs on the album deal with melancholy emotions and range from short and fragile ballads to long and open-ended dissonance.

Upon release, I Can Hear the Heart Beating as One reached number 19 on the Billboard's Heatseekers Albums chart, becoming the first Yo La Tengo album to enter the charts. Three songs from the album, "Autumn Sweater", "Sugarcube", and the cover "Little Honda", were released as singles. The album received widespread acclaim from music critics, who praised the band's ability to successfully expand the boundaries of nearly any pop style. The album is widely regarded as the band's best work and is frequently included on several publications' best album lists. In 2020, Rolling Stone included it on its list of The 500 Greatest Albums of All Time as no. 423.

== Background and recording ==
I Can Hear the Heart Beating as One is the follow-up to Yo La Tengo's highly acclaimed 1995 album Electr-O-Pura, which was ranked at number 9 in The Village Voice's 1995 Pazz & Jop critics' poll. Electr-O-Pura marked a new creative direction for the band. According to singer and guitarist Ira Kaplan, "I think after Electr-O-Pura we've had a direction of trying not to worry too hard about what the next album is going to sound like [...] we just write a bunch of songs, and then go one baby step at the time and just do what seems right." At the time, Kaplan also explained that the lyrics used to come last: "What will really happen is somebody will start playing and we'll all fall in and play for a long time. We'll finish playing an hour later and kinda say, 'Oh, do you remember what you did?' Then we'll write something down—or maybe we won't."

I Can Hear the Heart Beating as One was recorded at House of David in Nashville, Tennessee and produced by Roger Moutenot, who also produced the band's previous two albums. Kaplan described the recording sessions of the album as follows: "We hole up in a room and work for a really long time. Then we come out and blink our eyes because it's sunny out". Initially, the band did not intend to write a long album, but eventually felt that having a long album was the only way to accommodate the instrumental track "Spec Bebop", which the band felt needed to be included in the album "by hook or by crook". I Can Hear the Heart Beating as One is the only Yo La Tengo album that was recorded on an ADAT magnetic tape format, even though it was mixed to analog later. Moutenot refutes this, however, claiming the album was recorded with a 24-track Studer. Audio mixing took place at Big House and Magic Shop in New York City.

== Music and lyrics ==
I Can Hear the Heart Beating as One expands Electr-O-Pura's guitar-based pop to encompass a variety of other music genres, ranging from the bossa nova soundscapes of "Center of Gravity" to the electronic grooves of "Autumn Sweater", the krautrock jams of "Spec Bebop", the "jazzy goof" of "Moby Octopad", the trip hop sound of "Damage", and the psychedelic folk instrumentation of "We're an American Band", among others. Steven Arroyo of Pitchfork similized: "The album is as quiet and gentle as a winter snowfall, as loud and electric as a spring thunderstorm, as free and fun as a summer bike ride, and as durable and dependable as, yes, the world’s best autumn sweater."

The album also contains two cover songs: "Little Honda", a Beach Boys tune written by Brian Wilson and Mike Love, and "My Little Corner of the World", recorded by Anita Bryant, although the band initially did not know she had ever recorded it. The former, which is a song that Kaplan learned for a solo guitar show, was originally used to make sure the recording equipment was set up right. However, it was ultimately included in the album because, according to bassist James McNew, "it just sort of turned out pretty good."

The title to the song "Moby Octopad" is a reference to Yo La Tengo's appearance on the 1995 Lollapalooza tour, where the band performed mid-afternoon sets on the festival's side stage. Often performing earlier in the afternoon was the artist Moby. One of the instruments that Moby used in his performance was the Roland Octapad, an electronic percussion instrument. When taking the stage for their own performance, Yo La Tengo frequently noticed road crew's tape with "MOBY OCTAPAD" written on it, still left on the stage after Moby's set. The band later used this anecdote as the title for an instrumental that they were jamming on. Lyrics unrelated to the Moby story were added later.

Most of the lyrics on I Can Hear the Heart Beating as One deal with melancholy emotions. The track "Stockholm Syndrome", which is the first Yo La Tengo song sung by McNew, is about captives eventually expressing empathy toward their captors and vice versa. It was described by prominent music critic Robert Christgau as a "simulated Neil Young ballad". The song "Autumn Sweater", which is layered with complex rhythms and textures, explores themes of love and lack of communication, while "Center of Gravity" has been described as "a simple lo-fi devotional love song". I Can Hear the Heart Beating as One also marks the debut of Kaplan's falsetto singing, which was said to blur the line between his voice and that of drummer Georgia Hubley. The album's title is taken from a line in an unknown film. According to Kaplan, "I think it's a nice, evocative title—it seems to mean a lot but it doesn't really mean anything. It comes from a movie, but I'm not telling what movie. You'll have to see it one day and say, 'Eureka!'"

== Release ==
I Can Hear the Heart Beating as One was released on April 22, 1997, by the independent record label Matador Records. The album reached number 19 on the Billboard's Heatseekers Albums chart, becoming the first Yo La Tengo album to enter the charts. Three songs from the album, "Autumn Sweater", "Sugarcube", and "Little Honda", were released as singles or EPs in 1997. A music video featuring Mr. Show with Bob and David's comedians David Cross and Bob Odenkirk was made for "Sugarcube". The song "Moby Octopad", which was not released as a single, peaked at number 4 on the KEXP Top 90.3 Album Chart in 1997. As of March 2000, I Can Hear the Heart Beating as One has sold 73,000 copies in the U.S. according to Nielsen SoundScan, becoming Yo La Tengo's most commercially successful album at the time. In 2012, The Daily Beast reported that the record had sold 300,000 copies since release.

An insert card in the CD release parodied the marketing leaflets that are sometimes inserted into the jewel case for a compact disc, promoting other products from the same label. It "advertised" albums by imaginary artists, like "Condo Fucks", "Unsanitary Napkins", and "Künstler" in a variety of genres. In 2008, Yo La Tengo followed up on the joke by releasing Fuckbook, an album of covers credited to the "Condo Fucks".

== Critical reception ==
Professional ratings
Review scores
Source	Rating
AllMusic	5/5 stars
Chicago Tribune	3.5/4 stars
Entertainment Weekly	A−
The Guardian	4/5 stars
NME	8/10
Pitchfork	9.7/10
Rolling Stone	4/5 stars
The Rolling Stone Album Guide	5/5 stars
Spin	9/10
The Village Voice	A

Upon release, I Can Hear the Heart Beating as One received widespread acclaim from music critics. Matt Diehl of Rolling Stone felt that the album "proves that Yo La Tengo can master nearly any pop style [...] the music's ominousness is undercut by Yo La Tengo's infectious joy at simply making noise. It's just this joy that makes Yo La Tengo stand out amid their indie-rock peers". Similarly, in his review for Spin, Robert Christgau said that the album gave the band "the grace to professionalize toward the pop melodicism they've always loved." He also felt that the first nine songs were perfect and considered "Autumn Sweater" as the "very peak" of the album. Chicago Tribune reviewer Greg Kot highlighted the album's diverse influences, stating that the band "fashions sprawling albums out of minimal instrumental strokes and soft voices."

The album's range of power and soft elements was noted. Writing for Entertainment Weekly, David Browne said that, while the band has always been "adept at striking a balance between hurricane-force dissonance and fragile serenity", Yo La Tengo "crack open their sound even wider here. Their muted, after-hours guitar drone is in full effect [...] As adults who still need to make a racket, they remain addicted to noise, but now the trio integrates the feedback into the arrangements, like squalls rumbling in the distance." Dele Fadele of NME also praised the open-ended nature of the album, but criticized the instrumental "Spec Bebop" for being "constructed around some hurtful feedback, to end up as an endurance test." In a very positive review, Jason Josephes of Pitchfork praised the album for exploring new directions, commenting that the band takes its "sonic inventions to new levels."

I Can Hear the Heart Beating as One was ranked number 5 in The Village Voice's 1997 Pazz & Jop critics' poll, the band's highest position to date. In the poll's accompanying essay, Christgau referred to the album as one of his "favorite albums of the year, easy", alongside those by Pavement, Sleater-Kinney, and Arto Lindsay. Similarly, editors of NME magazine placed the album at number 19 in their albums of the year list for 1997, while Spin journalists placed the album at number 8 in their list of Top 20 Albums of the Year.

== Legacy ==
Retrospectively, I Can Hear the Heart Beating as One is widely regarded as the band's best work. AllMusic reviewer Fred Thomas described it as "a definitive master statement. The subtly shifting moods and wide, curious palette of stylistic exploration resulted in a lasting indie rock classic, essential listening and also something of a blueprint for much of what followed from like-minded bands for years to come." The A.V. Club editor John Krewson remarked that the album marked the point when the band started to "[dabble] on electronica" with songs such as "Moby Octopad" and "Autumn Sweater", calling it "an example of a band having great fun exploring the possibilities of pop music." In his review of the band's 2003 album Summer Sun, Christgau praised I Can Hear the Heart Beating as One as Yo La Tengo's "career album", commenting that "It's no challenge or insult to state categorically that they'll never top it." In 2017, Pitchfork writer Marc Hogan described the record as the band's "first true masterpiece."

I Can Hear the Heart Beating as One is frequently included on several publications' best album lists. In 1999, the record was ranked number 78 on Spin's list of The 90 Greatest Albums of the '90s. In 2003, Pitchfork ranked it number 25 on its list of the Top 100 albums of the 1990s. According to staff writer Steven Arroyo: "This was not Yo La Tengo’s first great album, nor their second, but it marked the first time that they were so great in so many different ways at once." The site would later place the album at number 73 in an updated 2022 list. Similarly, Rolling Stone placed the record at number 86 on its 2010 compilation of 100 Best Albums of the Nineties. In 2012, the album appeared at number 22 on Paste's list of The 90 Best Albums of the 1990s. In 2020, Rolling Stone ranked Beating as One number 423 on its list of The 500 Greatest Albums of All Time.

== Track listing ==
All tracks are written by Yo La Tengo unless otherwise noted.

I Can Hear the Heart Beating as One track listing
No.	Title	Writer(s)	Vocals	Length
1.	"Return to Hot Chicken"			1:38
2.	"Moby Octopad"	Incorporates portions of "Bird Bath" by Burt Bacharach	Hubley, Kaplan, McNew	5:48
3.	"Sugarcube"		Kaplan, Hubley	3:21
4.	"Damage"		Kaplan	4:39
5.	"Deeper into Movies"		Kaplan, Hubley	5:23
6.	"Shadows"		Hubley	2:27
7.	"Stockholm Syndrome"		McNew	2:51
8.	"Autumn Sweater"		Kaplan	5:18
9.	"Little Honda"	Brian Wilson, Mike Love	Kaplan	3:07
10.	"Green Arrow"			5:43
11.	"One PM Again"		Kaplan	2:25
12.	"The Lie and How We Told It"		Kaplan, Hubley, McNew	3:19
13.	"Center of Gravity"		Hubley, Kaplan	2:42
14.	"Spec Bebop"			10:40
15.	"We're an American Band"		Kaplan, Hubley	6:25
16.	"My Little Corner of the World"	Bob Hilliard, Lee Pockriss	Hubley	2:24
Total length:				68:10

== Personnel ==
Credits are adapted from the album's liner notes.

- Yo La Tengo – Georgia, Ira, James
- Al Perkins – lap steel guitar (track 2), pedal steel guitar (track 11)
- Jonathan Marx – trumpet (track 6)
- Roger Moutenot – production
- Greg Calbi – mastering
- Jad Fair – artwork
- Steve Thornton – photography

== Charts ==
Chart performance for I Can Hear the Heart Beating as One
Chart (1997)	Peak position
US Top Heatseekers Albums (Billboard)	19

2022 chart performance for I Can Hear the Heart Beating as One
Chart (2022)	Peak position
Scottish Albums (Official Charts)	46
UK Independent Albums (Official Charts)	24
