= Little Voice (soundtracks) =

Little Voice: Season 1 (Apple TV+ Original Series Soundtrack)

Soundtrack album by Sara Bareilles
- Released: August 21, 2020
- Genre: Soundtrack
- Length: 47:09
- Label: Epic
- Producer: Sara Bareilles; Tyler Chester

Little Voice: Season 1 (Apple TV+ Original Series Soundtrack) is the soundtrack to the 2020 television series of the same name. The album featured compositions for the show by the showrunner and executive producer Sara Bareilles, and songs were performed by the principal cast. The album was led by the single "Little Voice" on June 19, 2020, and was preceded by two extended plays: the first one featuring the songs from the first three episodes, were released on July 10, and second featuring songs from the first six episodes were released on July 31, until the full album was released on August 21 by Epic Records.

== Background ==
According to Sara Bareilles, there were a handful of songs that were included, either Bareilles and co-writer Jessie Nelson wrote it toward from a narrative perspective, or which just happened to sort of fit into the world of the show because they were written at that time in their life. She cited "Coming Back to You" in the second episode, as a song from her life where she was "trying to get back to the purest connection between her and the muse". She wrote the title song "Little Voice" for her eponymous second studio album in 2007 and while submitting the song to Epic Records, the executives told that the song was not strong as the rest of the albums and should be omitted, which left her upset. When she discussed with Nelson of a theme song, he could not crack a new theme, but however remembered of the track "Little Voice" and sent to her knowing that it would be resonated with the show, which was later approved.

== Track listing ==
All tracks are written by Sara Bareilles, except where noted. All tracks were performed by the Little Voice cast members, except where noted

No.	Title	Length
1.	"Little Voice" (performed by Sara Bareilles)	2:19
2.	"I Don't Know Anything"	2:35
3.	"Waiting For My Real Life to Begin" (written by Colin Hay and Thomas Mooney)	2:44
4.	"Coming Back To You"	3:38
5.	"Valerie" (written by Abigail Harding, Boyan Uddin Chowdhury, David Alan McCabe, Russell Thomas Pritchard)	2:38
6.	"Dear Hope"	3:53
7.	"King of the Lost Boys" (co-written by Jason Blynn, Earl the Squirrel, and Peter William Harper)	4:32
8.	"In July" (written by Jack DeBose and Samora Pinderhughes)	2:27
9.	"More Love" (co-written by Jack Antonoff)	3:37
10.	"Our Way To Fall" (performed by Chris Thile, Madison Cunningham; written by Georgia Hubley, Ira David Kaplan and James McNew)	3:54
11.	"Tell Her" (co-written by Hillary Lindsey, Lori McKenna, and Justin Trantor)	4:47
12.	"Simple and True"	3:34
13.	"Ghost Light"	4:06
14.	"Little Voice Finale"	2:25
Total length:		47:09

== More Love: Songs from Little Voice Season One ==
A separate album featuring songs from the series, were recorded by Bareilles, which was released as More Love: Songs from Little Voice Season One on September 11, 2020. The album reached 32 in its one-week on Billboard's Album Sales chart on September 19.
