= Fuckbook =

2009 album

Studio album by Condo Fucks
- Released: March 24, 2009
- Genres: Indie rock, garage rock
- Length: 30:54
- Label: Matador
- Producer: Yo La Tengo

Yo La Tengo chronology
They Shoot, We Score (2008)	Fuckbook (2009)	Popular Songs (2009)

Professional ratings
Review scores
Source	Rating
AllMusic	3/5 stars
Drowned in Sound	8/10
Pitchfork	8.3/10
Tiny Mix Tapes	3.5/5 stars

Fuckbook is an album released by indie rock band Yo La Tengo under the alias Condo Fucks in 2009. The band name comes from an inner sleeve listing fake albums and genre send-ups included in their 1997 album I Can Hear the Heart Beating as One. The album title is a reference to their 1990 album Fakebook. Guitarist Ira Kaplan and drummer Georgia Hubley are credited on this album as Kid Condo and Georgia Condo, respectively. The Matador press release for the album creates a fictional backstory for the band that hints at the truth. The album is purportedly produced by Mutt Lange, mixed by Bob Clearmountain, and mastered by Greg Calbi, but this is unconfirmed and most likely part of the gag.

The album is entirely cover versions, written by a variety of musical acts of the 1960s and 1970s, including The Kinks, Slade, The Small Faces, The Troggs and The Beach Boys.

== Track listing ==
1. "What'cha Gonna Do About It" – 2:29 (Steve Marriott, Ronnie Lane, Ian Samwell)
2. "Accident" – 2:19 (Brian McMahon)
3. "This Is Where I Belong" – 2:45 (Ray Davies)
4. "Shut Down" – 1:48 (Brian Wilson, Roger Christian)
5. "Shut Down Part 2" – 2:09 (Carl Wilson)
6. "With a Girl Like You" – 2:36 (Reg Presley)
7. "The Kid with the Replaceable Head" – 2:21 (Richard Hell)
8. "Dog Meat" – 4:07 (Chris Wilson, Cyril Jordan)
9. "So Easy Baby" – 3:09 (Billy Miller)
10. "Come On Up" – 2:53 (Felix Cavaliere)
11. "Gudbuy T'Jane" – 4:15 (Jim Lea, Noddy Holder)
