= Electr-O-Pura =

Studio album by Yo La Tengo
- Released: May 2, 1995
- Studio: Alex the Great (Nashville)
- Genres: Indie rock, noise pop
- Length: 58:23
- Label: Matador
- Producer: Roger Moutenot

Yo La Tengo chronology
Painful (1993)	Electr-O-Pura (1995)	Genius + Love = Yo La Tengo (1996)

Singles from Electr-O-Pura
- 1. "Tom Courtenay" Released: March 21, 1995; 2. "Blue Line Swinger" Released: October 1995

Electr-O-Pura is the seventh studio album by American indie rock band Yo La Tengo, released on May 2, 1995, by record label Matador. The album received very positive reviews from music critics.

== Music ==
Music critic Jim DeRogatis said Yo La Tengo "came into its psychedelic own" with Electr-O-Pura, describing the sound as “frenetic.”

== Recording and release ==
Electr-O-Pura was recorded at Alex the Great Studios in Nashville, Tennessee, and produced by Roger Moutenot, who recorded the band's previous album, Painful. The band named the album after an extinct soda brand; they discovered the name while they were visiting the Museum of Beverage Containers in Nashville while the album was still in production. The hyphens were added as the band's "own editorial comment." Electr-O-Pura was released on May 2, 1995, by the independent record label Matador Records. The song "Tom Courtenay", which is a tribute to the English film star, was released as a single on March 21, 1995.

In the back of the CD case, the songs are deliberately listed with wrong running times to fool listeners. As singer and guitarist Ira Kaplan explains, "I think sometimes people have a tendency to look at a song and say, 'Oh, it's six minutes long. This is gonna suck. Pop songs should be three minutes.' So we thought we'd say, 'Oh yeah, we agree with you completely', and have people not go into 'Flying Lesson' or 'Blue Line Swinger' already armed to not like this song, and maybe trick them into listening to it once." The alternate titles were lifted from a book on the Blues Project.

== Critical reception ==
Professional ratings
Review scores
Source	Rating
AllMusic	3/5 stars
Chicago Tribune	3.5/4 stars
Christgau's Consumer Guide	A
The Encyclopedia of Popular Music	3/5 stars
Entertainment Weekly	A
Pitchfork	9.1/10
The Rolling Stone Album Guide	5/5 stars
Select	4/5
Spin	9/10
The Village Voice	A−

Electr-O-Pura received very positive reviews from music critics. Steven Mirkin, writing for Entertainment Weekly, commented: "Combining homespun charm, critical sophistication, and a fan's enthusiasm, Yo La Tengo sounds like a well-adjusted Velvet Underground. Electr-O-Pura's songs run the gamut from loopy pop to pensive folk to flat-out weird; their unpretentious honesty brings them together into a musically and emotionally satisfying whole."

In 1996, the album was ranked at number 9 in The Village Voice's Pazz & Jop critics' poll for 1995. Spin placed the album at number 11 on their list of the "20 Best Albums of '95".

Mark Deming of AllMusic gave the album three stars and wrote: "Few bands have consistently better ideas than Yo La Tengo, and they make 14 of them work like a charm on Electr-O-Pura."

== Track listing ==
No.	Title	Vocals	Length
1.	"Decora"	Hubley	3:27
2.	"Flying Lesson (Hot Chicken #1)"	Kaplan	6:42
3.	"The Hour Grows Late"	Kaplan	3:06
4.	"Tom Courtenay"	Kaplan	3:30
5.	"False Ending"		0:56
6.	"Pablo and Andrea"	Hubley	4:16
7.	"Paul Is Dead"	Kaplan	2:26
8.	"False Alarm"	Kaplan	5:28
9.	"The Ballad of Red Buckets"	Kaplan	4:00
10.	"Don't Say a Word (Hot Chicken #2)"	Hubley	3:28
11.	"(Straight Down to the) Bitter End"	Hubley	3:59
12.	"My Heart's Reflection"	Kaplan	6:02
13.	"Attack on Love"	Kaplan	1:52
14.	"Blue Line Swinger"	Hubley	9:19

== Personnel ==
Yo La Tengo

- Georgia Hubley
- Ira Kaplan
- James McNew

Production

- Roger Moutenot – producer
- Brad Jones – recording assistant
- Devin Emke – mixing assistant
- Fred Brockman – recording ("Pablo and Andrea" and "False Alarm")
- Ed Raso – mixing assistant
- Scott Ansell – sequencing
- Greg Calbi – mastering
- Georgia Hubley – design
