= The Sounds of the Sounds of Science =

Film score by Yo La Tengo
- Released: 2002
- Recorded: September 2001
- Genres: Indie rock, instrumental rock
- Length: 77:05
- Label: Egon Records
- Producer: Roger Moutenot

Yo La Tengo chronology
| And Then Nothing Turned Itself Inside-Out (2000) | The Sounds of the Sounds of Science (2002) | Summer Sun (2003) |

Professional ratings
Review scores
| Source | Rating |
|---|---|
| AllMusic | 4/5 stars |
| Dusted Magazine | (favorable) |
| Pitchfork | (8.0/10) |
| Stylus | (B) |

The Sounds of the Sounds of Science is a score written by Yo La Tengo for filmmaker Jean Painlevé. It contains 78 minutes of instrumental music to accompany his eight short documentary-style films shot underwater. The live performances are known as “The Sounds of Science.” The program debuted in 2001 at the San Francisco Film Festival. The entire score has been performed approximately twelve times. The band had not heard of Painlevé before being asked to work on the project nor did the band view the films much before writing the music.

In an interview with Jim DeRogatis of the Chicago Sun-Times, guitarist Ira Kaplan stated:

What was different was that it was all sound for the most part. There was melody involved in the pieces, but it was really all about mood. There's so much of that in the songs we work on anyway, but to think only about the way the mood was developing was a big difference. The songs tend to start the same way with just the three of us kind of playing and seeing what comes out, but once we had something that we were working on, it was a lot different, and the pieces were all 10 minutes long!

The album's cover photos are from the accompanying films. The album artwork was designed by Jim Woodring and Jad Fair.

== Track listing ==
| No. | Title | Length |
|---|---|---|
| 1. | "Sea Urchins" | 10:22 |
| 2. | "Hyas and Stenorhynchus" | 9:12 |
| 3. | "Shrimp Stories" | 6:43 |
| 4. | "How Some Jellyfish Are Born" | 8:22 |
| 5. | "Liquid Crystals" | 8:54 |
| 6. | "The Love Life of the Octopus" | 11:59 |
| 7. | "Acera or the Witches' Dance" | 8:15 |
| 8. | "The Sea Horse" | 13:18 |

== Sources ==
- Yo La Tengo.com's Page on The Sounds of the Sounds of Science
