= Fade (Yo La Tengo album) =

Studio album by Yo La Tengo
- Released: January 15, 2013
- Studio: Soma
- Genres: Indie rock; indie pop
- Length: 45:48
- Language: English
- Label: Matador
- Producer: John McEntire

Yo La Tengo chronology
Popular Songs (2009)	Fade (2013)	Stuff Like That There (2015)

Singles from Fade
- 1. "Stupid Things" Released: 25 September 2012; 2. "I'll Be Around" Released: 28 January 2013; 3. "Ohm"

Fade is the thirteenth studio album by American indie rock band Yo La Tengo. It was produced by John McEntire, instead of Roger Moutenot, who had produced all their albums since 1993's Painful. It was recorded at Soma in Chicago, in the summer of 2012. It was released on January 15, 2013.

== Release ==
Professional ratings
Aggregate scores
Source	Rating
AnyDecentMusic?	7.8/10
Metacritic	82/100
Review scores
Source	Rating
AllMusic	4/5 stars
The A.V. Club	B+
Entertainment Weekly	B+
The Guardian	4/5 stars
Los Angeles Times	3.5/4 stars
MSN Music (Expert Witness)	A−
NME	7/10
Pitchfork	8.1/10
Rolling Stone	3.5/5 stars
Spin	8/10

The "Stupid Things" EP was released on 12" and CD on September 25, 2012, prior to the album release. It contains a different version of the title song. "Ohm" was released as a limited edition triple 12" in "a printed flat in a 4-box poly shower curtain display case" in July 2013. On November 5, 2013 the 12" of "Super Kiwi" was released. The title song was recorded during the Fade sessions with John McEntire. On the B-side there is a cover of the Beach Boys' "A Day in the Life of a Tree".

Fade debuted at number 26 on the Billboard 200 chart upon its release in January 2013, with sales of 14,000 copies. It marked the band's all-time chart peak as well as the first time a Yo La Tengo record has entered the top 40.

There are three different editions of the vinyl LP available: the Standard Edition, another which comes with the Fade CD included, and a "Deluxe Limited Edition" that contains a bonus 7" with two extra songs and an exclusive download track. The "Deluxe Limited Edition" 2-CD set contains a special CD called Fade Out with 14 bonus tracks and four additional downloads (the 12" version of "Stupid Things" and three mixes from "Oriole" from the "Ohm" triple 12" edition).

A DVD called Tree, animated by Jim Woodring, was released on January 14, 2014. It contains an animated short of 5:20 minutes, based on artwork from Fade. The song "Super Kiwi" is featured. The packaging comes with three soft vinyl figurines, sculpted by Tomohiro Yasui, representing the band members, and a bonus comic on the back.

== Music videos ==
Donick Cary (Simpsons, Letterman, Parks and Recreation) of Sugarshack Animation (Sugarshackanimation.com) directed the videos for "Ohm" and its sequel "Is That Enough" featuring Fred Willard Emily Hubley directed the "Before We Run" animated video. Phil Morrison, long time Yo La Tengo collaborator and film director, did the video for "I'll Be Around", starring Mac McCaughan of Superchunk and the members of Yo La Tengo. This marks the first proper video clip from the band since "Sugarcube" (also directed by Morrison).

== Track listing ==
All tracks are written by Yo La Tengo.

No.	Title	Length
1.	"Ohm"	6:48
2.	"Is That Enough"	4:15
3.	"Well You Better"	2:37
4.	"Paddle Forward"	2:49
5.	"Stupid Things"	5:06
6.	"I'll Be Around"	4:47
7.	"Cornelia and Jane"	4:49
8.	"Two Trains"	4:45
9.	"The Point of It"	3:38
10.	"Before We Run"	6:14
Total length:		45:48

Deluxe Edition bonus track 7"
No.	Title	Length
11.	"I Saw the Light" (Todd Rundgren cover)	2:49
12.	"Move to California" (Times New Viking)	3:44
13.	"Oriole" (exclusive download track)	11:05
Total length:		62:46

Deluxe Edition 2-CD set: Fade Out
No.	Title	Length
1.	"Ohm (Live 1)"	6:12
2.	"Two Trains (Demo)"	5:41
3.	"Note to Self"	3:24
4.	"Move to California (Times New Viking)"	3:46
5.	"Is That Enough (Live at NPR Music)"	4:18
6.	"Cornelia and Jane (Instrumental)"	4:45
7.	"A Day in the Life of a Tree" (The Beach Boys cover)	3:41
8.	"Super Kiwi"	3:09
9.	"Stupid Things (EYヨ Remix)"	5:19
10.	"I Saw the Light" (Todd Rundgren cover)	2:49
11.	"Stupid Things (Instrumental)"	5:05
12.	"Ohm (Live 2)"	8:33
13.	"Oriole 5"	11:05
14.	"La Grange" (ZZ Top cover)	2:57
15.	"Stupid Things (12" Version)" (download track)	5:10
16.	"Oriole (Mix 12)" (download track)	14:35
17.	"Oriole (Mix 15)" (download track)	14:35
18.	"Oriole (Mix 29)" (download track)	14:38
Total length:		114:00

== Personnel ==
Yo La Tengo

- Ira Kaplan - vocals, guitars, keyboards, synthesizers
- Georgia Hubley - drums, guitars, vocals, keyboards, percussion
- James McNew - bass, guitars, vocals

Mastered by Greg Calbi at Sterling Sound

Additional musicians

- Andy Baker - trombone ("Cornelia and Jane", "Before We Run")
- Brian Drye - trombone ("Before We Run")
- Robert Fisher - viola ("Is That Enough", "Stupid Things", "Before We Run")
- Jeff Hermanson - trumpet ("Before We Run")
- Todd Matthews - violin ("Is That Enough", "Stupid Things", "Before We Run")
- Rob Mazurek - cornet ("Cornelia and Jane", "Before We Run")
- John McEntire - percussion ("Ohm") and vibes ("Two Trains")
- Michael McGinnis - baritone saxophone ("Before We Run")
- Jeff Parker - string arrangement ("Is That Enough")
- William Porter - cello ("Is That Enough", "Before We Run")
- Phyllis Sanders - violin ("Is That Enough", "Stupid Things", "Before We Run")

Art

- Design by Mark One
- Photographs by Carlie Armstrong
