= Painful (album) =

Studio album by Yo La Tengo
- Released: October 5, 1993
- Recorded: 1993
- Genres: Shoegaze; dream pop
- Length: 48:36
- Label: Matador
- Producers: Fred Brockman; Roger Moutenot

Yo La Tengo chronology
May I Sing with Me (1992)	Painful (1993)	Electr-O-Pura (1995)

Singles from Painful
- 1. "Big Day Coming" Released: 30 September 1993; 2. "From a Motel 6" Released: 7 January 1994

Professional ratings
Review scores
Source	Rating
AllMusic	4.5/5 stars
Chicago Tribune	4/4 stars
Christgau's Consumer Guide	A−
Entertainment Weekly	B+
Mojo	4/5 stars
NME	8/10
Pitchfork	9.6/10
Q	4/5 stars
The Rolling Stone Album Guide	5/5 stars
Spin Alternative Record Guide	9/10

Painful is the sixth studio album by American indie rock band Yo La Tengo, released in 1993 by record label Matador, their first for the label.

On 2 December 2014, the album was reissued with bonus material as Extra Painful, available on double CD, double vinyl and as a digital download.

== Music ==
The album marked a creative shift from Yo La Tengo's previous work, blending atmospheric and ambient sounds with their famous noise jams. Painful features a much more melody-driven Yo La Tengo in its hazy, dream-like songwriting. Music journalist Andrew Earles described the album as the band's "ultimate love letter" to UK shoegaze and New Zealand indie pop, calling it the band's most atmospheric-sounding release to date. Music critic Jim DeRogatis said the tracks “Big Day Coming” and “Sudden Organ” have been noted for their elements of psychedelic music. Music critic Robert Christgau characterized the album as "Hoboken's answer to My Bloody Valentine".

Two versions of the track "Big Day Coming" are present on the album.

== Reception and legacy ==
Music critic Robert Christgau gave Painful a score of A-minus, and wrote: "This is not the forbidding experimentation of an aspiring vanguard. This is the fooling around of folks who like to go out on Saturday night and make some noise--and then go home humming it."

In recent years, Painful has become regarded as a significant step for Yo La Tengo in their discography. In a biography of the band, AllMusic's Mark Deming dubbed it "their first masterpiece", seeing it push them "in a multitude of new directions, significantly expanding [their] palette of sounds and textures." Reflecting on it in a 20th anniversary review, Spectrum Culture's Rodger Coleman called it "revelatory, ageless and sublime." He saw it as the album "where they first came together as a real band," as well as showing "a substantial refinement of sound and approach."

In 2014, Stuart Berman of Pitchfork gave the album's reissue on the band's 30th anniversary a score of 9.6 out of 10, and wrote: "From this point on, Yo La Tengo could no longer be described as mere Velvet Underground wannabes, and within just a few years, you’d be hard-pressed to even call them a rock band anymore. But then, such a free-ranging future seemed almost predestined when, after a decade of playing the rock'n'roll classicist, Kaplan opened up Painful by declaring, 'let’s be undecided.' As Yo La Tengo’s post-Painful path would prove, indecision has never sounded so assured."

== Track listing ==
No.	Title	Writer(s)	Vocals	Length
1.	"Big Day Coming"	Ira Kaplan	Kaplan	7:04
2.	"From a Motel 6"	Ira Kaplan; Georgia Hubley	Hubley; Kaplan	4:08
3.	"Double Dare"	Ira Kaplan	Kaplan	3:28
4.	"Superstar-Watcher"	Yo La Tengo		1:42
5.	"Nowhere Near"	Georgia Hubley	Hubley	6:01
6.	"Sudden Organ"	Ira Kaplan	Kaplan	4:42
7.	"A Worrying Thing"	Ira Kaplan	Kaplan	2:53
8.	"I Was the Fool Beside You for Too Long"	Yo La Tengo	Kaplan	5:04
9.	"The Whole of the Law"	Peter Perrett	Hubley; Kaplan	2:19
10.	"Big Day Coming"	Ira Kaplan	Kaplan	4:14
11.	"I Heard You Looking"	Yo La Tengo		7:01

Extra Painful bonus disc
No.	Title	Length
1.	"Nowhere Near" (demo)	7:14
2.	"From A Motel 6" (live acoustic)	3:44
3.	"Tunnel Vision" (unreleased instrumental demo)	1:43
4.	"Sudden Organ" (demo)	7:35
5.	"Smart Window" (unreleased Painful session)	3:16
6.	"Big Day Coming" (live acoustic)	3:10
7.	"Slow Learner" (unreleased demo)	6:38
8.	"Double Dare" (demo)	3:24
9.	"A Worrying Thing" (demo)	2:57
10.	"I Heard You Looking" (live)	9:17

Extra Painful bonus downloadable additional tracks
No.	Title	Length
1.	"Double Dare (Sominextraction)" (live, CBGB, 1/31/92)	5:41
2.	"What She Wants" (live, House Of Music, West Orange)	2:54
3.	"Ashes On The Ground" (live, SIR, 9/29/93))	5:14
4.	"Nutricia" (recorded At Snack Time by Fred Brockman)	5:04
5.	"For Shame Of Doing Wrong (Slide Version)" (live, House Of Music, West Orange)	4:37
6.	"Superstar Watcher" (recorded At Snack Time by Fred Brockman)	1:45
7.	"Big Day Coming" (live, Reckless Records, 4/26/92)	19:02
8.	"I Was The Fool Beside You For Too Long" (live, SIR, 9/29/93)	4:43
9.	"Shaker" (live, The Batschkapp, Frankfurt, 1/3/94)	3:07
10.	"Artificial Heart" (live, Shank Hall, 5/11/93)	2:39
11.	"Whole Of The Law Loops" (Painful Sessions, Water Music & James Apartment 1992)	2:45
12.	"Nowhere Near" (live, Lounge Ax, Chicago 11/13/93)	6:04
13.	"Sleeping Pill" (excerpt From "Ian Mackaye", Room Temperature, Brooklyn 2/20/93)	2:12
14.	"Big Day Coming" (live, SIR, 9/29/93)	3:45
15.	"Sudden Organ" (live, SIR, 9/29/93)	7:04

Shaker 7" reissue
No.	Title	Length
1.	"Shaker"
2.	"For Shame Of Doing Wrong" (8-Track Version - the CD single contained a different version which is on the download coupon)

Notes

- An exact reproduction of the original single Shaker 7" came with the vinyl edition.
- 15 additional bonus tracks were available for download

== Personnel ==
- Georgia Hubley – drums, percussion, vocals, guitar, organ
- Ira Kaplan – vocals, guitar, organ, percussion
- James McNew – bass, vocals, guitar, percussion
