= Summer Sun =

Studio album by Yo La Tengo
- Released: April 8, 2003
- Studios: Alex the Great Recording, Nashville, Tennessee
- Genres: Post-rock; dream pop; indie rock
- Length: 62:31
- Label: Matador
- Producer: Roger Moutenot

Yo La Tengo chronology
The Sounds of the Sounds of Science (2002)	Summer Sun (2003)	Prisoners of Love: A Smattering of Scintillating Senescent Songs: 1985–2003 (2004)

Singles from Summer Sun
- 1. "Today Is the Day" Released: October 21, 2003

Summer Sun is the tenth studio album by American indie rock band Yo La Tengo, released on April 8, 2003 by record label Matador.

== Recording ==
Summer Sun was recorded in Nashville, United States. The album was mixed at Shelter Island in New York.

== Content ==
Georgia Hubley's mother, Faith Hubley, died right before the band started working on the album. The Hubley family piano went into Yo La Tengo's practice space in Jersey City, and became the center piece for the sound of the album.

On the album's style, The A.V. Club reviewer Keith Phipps notes that "Summer Sun finds Yo La Tengo in a twilight mood, interspersing instrumentals and one elongated jam (the tellingly titled 'Let's Be Still') between atmospheric, quietly ingratiating pop songs."

=== Album cover ===
The cover is a double exposure photograph taken in a New Jersey parking lot.

Despite the title of the album, the cover shows the band wearing Winter coats. When asked about this odd juxtaposition, guitarist Ira Kaplan said: "We really need to get together with the Matador art department about that. We submitted eight rolls of film containing one shot after another of us in bathing suits. At the end of the session, the photographer requested one shot of us in our winter coats, "for his personal collection" we were assured. Imagine our dismay when the album came out."

== Reception ==
Professional ratings
Aggregate scores
Source	Rating
Metacritic	77/100
Review scores
Source	Rating
AllMusic	3.5/5 stars
Christgau's Consumer Guide	A
Entertainment Weekly	B
The Guardian	4/5 stars
Mojo	4/5 stars
NME	8/10
Pitchfork	6.0/10
Q	3/5 stars
Rolling Stone	4/5 stars
Spin	B

Summer Sun has received a favorable reception from critics, though with several reviewers seeing it as a natural come-down from the heights of their previous records. It holds an approval rating of 77 out of 100 on Metacritic.

Mojo called the album "A set of busy beautiful whispers; 62 minutes of exquisite suspended animation" Alternative Press called it Yo La Tengo's "most challenging album to date". Uncut wrote, "From the edge of the sea, back to the fringes of sleep, Summer Sun is uncommonly lovely".

Greg Milner of Spin wrote: "Summer Sun sometimes sounds like a band treading water at low tide, but obsessively exploring the contours of a moment is what Yo La have been about from day one." AllMusic's Heather Phares called it "an album that's as settled and smooth as the previous one was inventive and eclectic. [...] But, even though Yo La Tengo can still run circles around other groups even when they're running in place, compared to their best work Summer Sun is merely pleasant." PopMatters' Adrien Begrand wrote" "As good as Summer Sun is, and it's very good, it just doesn't quite have the timeless, magical quality that ...And Then Nothing had."

Eric Carr of Pitchfork opined that the album "marks Yo La Tengo's first album since their 1986 debut, Ride the Tiger, to lack invention altogether." Andrew Unterberger of Stylus Magazine echoed similar sentiments, writing "Summer Sun, while constantly very good, is never creative, inspiring or great. And sorry, guys, we've just come to expect better of you. It's more of a compliment than anything else, honestly." Even more negative was Michael Chamy of The Austin Chronicle, writing "Most of Summer Sun is underwhelming to downright cringe-inducing."

As of 2006, sales in the United States have exceeded 70,000 copies, according to Nielsen SoundScan.

== Track listing ==
All tracks are written by Yo La Tengo (Georgie Hubley, Ira Kaplan, James McNew), except "Take Care" by Alex Chilton.

No.	Title	Vocals	Length
1.	"Beach Party Tonight"		3:06
2.	"Little Eyes"	Hubley	4:18
3.	"Nothing But You and Me"	Kaplan	5:13
4.	"Season of the Shark"	Kaplan	4:27
5.	"Today Is the Day"	Hubley	5:33
6.	"Tiny Birds"	McNew	5:07
7.	"How to Make a Baby Elephant Float"	Kaplan	3:29
8.	"Georgia vs. Yo La Tengo"		3:56
9.	"Don't Have To Be So Sad"	Kaplan	5:53
10.	"Winter A-Go-Go"	Hubley	3:21
11.	"Moonrock Mambo"	Kaplan	4:49
12.	"Let's Be Still"	Hubley, Kaplan	10:22
13.	"Take Care"	Hubley	2:32
Total length:			62:31

== Personnel ==
Yo La Tengo

- Georgia Hubley
- Ira Kaplan
- James McNew

Additional musicians

- Roy Campbell Jr. – trumpet ("Beach Party Tonight", "Don't Have to Be So Sad", "Let's Be Still")
- Daniel Carter – tenor saxophone ("Beach Party Tonight"), alto saxophone ("Don't Have to Be So Sad") and flute ("Let's Be Still")
- Katie Gentile – violin ("Tiny Birds")
- Tim Harris – cello ("Tiny Birds")
- Sabir Mateen – alto saxophone ("Beach Party Tonight"), tenor saxophone ("Don't Have to Be So Sad") and flute ("How to Make a Baby Elephant Float", "Let's Be Still")
- Paul Niehaus – pedal steel guitar ("Take Care")
- William Parker – upright bass ("Beach Party Tonight", "Nothing But You and Me", "Don't Have to Be So Sad", "Let's Be Still", "Take Care")

Technical

- Roger Moutenot – producer
- Greg Calbi – mastering
- Phil Morrison – sleeve photography
- Alex Kirzhner – sleeve layout
