= Periodically Double or Triple =

Periodically Double or Triple is a song by American band Yo La Tengo, from their 2009 album Popular Songs. The music video was directed by John McSwain, and features stop motion animation with pieces of fruit, interspersed with close-ups of various people eating fruit.

== Reception ==
Stereogum felt that it was "mellow" and "could have been written in the '60s", while the Guardian called it "strutting, tongue-in-cheek funk". Pitchfork compared the song to Booker T, Sun Ra and the Zombies, but considered it overall to fit the distinct sound of the band, and praised details of the songwriting such as the "out-of-nowhere elevator-music break". National Public Radio praised it as a "marvel of spare instrumentation".
