= Popular Songs =

Studio album by Yo La Tengo
- Released: September 8, 2009
- Recorded: Early 2009, Hoboken, New Jersey and Nashville, Tennessee, United States
- Genres: Indie rock, indie pop
- Length: 72:49
- Language: English
- Label: Matador
- Producer: Roger Moutenot

Yo La Tengo chronology
Fuckbook (2009)	Popular Songs (2009)	Fade (2013)

Singles from Popular Songs
- 1. "Here to Fall" Released: 28 July 2009; 2. "Periodically Double or Triple" Released: 4 August 2009; 3. "Avalon or Someone Very Similar" Released: 11 August 2009; 4. "Nothing to Hide" Released: 18 August 2009; 5. "When It's Dark" Released: 1 September 2009

Popular Songs is the twelfth studio album by the American indie rock band Yo La Tengo, released digitally, on CD, and double LP on September 8, 2009, by the Matador record label.

== Content ==
=== Artwork ===
The band contacted the conceptual artist Dario Robleto. He contributed three pieces for the album design:

- At War With the Entropy of Nature / Ghost Don't Always Want to Come Back (2002) (cover)
- A Dark Day for the Dinosaurs (Radio Edit) (2000-2001) (inlay)
- Sometimes Billie Is All That Holds Me Together (1998-1999) (back cover)

== Music videos ==
Four videos were made by the director John McSwain to accompany one song from the album each. In the weeks leading up to the release of the album, a new video was posted on Matador's various "partner sites" and collected on Matador's own website. The first video, for "Here to Fall", was posted on Matador's own "Matablog" on July 28, 2009.

== Release ==
Professional ratings
Aggregate scores
Source	Rating
AnyDecentMusic?	7.2/10
Metacritic	79/100
Review scores
Source	Rating
AllMusic	4/5 stars
The A.V. Club	A−
BBC Music	positive
Drowned in Sound	8/10
The Guardian	4/5 stars
MusicOMH	4/5 stars
Pitchfork	7.9/10
PopMatters	7/10
Rolling Stone	3.5/5 stars
Slant Magazine	4/5 stars

Popular Songs was leaked onto the Internet on July 26. In response, Matador began streaming the album to Buy Early Get Now customers on July 28, more than a week before the stream was originally advertised to begin.

Popular Songs was released on September 8, 2009, by Matador. It was the eighth album to be given Matador's Buy Early Get Now treatment, in which it was sold with a vinyl LP with Yo La Tengo's original score from the film Adventureland, as well as three bonus tracks as download in MP3 and FLAC. The first two of these downloads were demo versions of two album tracks and became available shortly before the release of the CD. The third download became available on December 15, 2009. The same track is also available in the iTunes Store and on the Japanese CD issue of the album.

By 2012, it had sold over 43,000 copies in United States.

== Track listing ==
All songs written by Georgia Hubley, Ira Kaplan and James McNew.

No.	Title	Length
1.	"Here to Fall"	5:45
2.	"Avalon or Someone Very Similar"	3:17
3.	"By Two's"	4:29
4.	"Nothing to Hide"	2:46
5.	"Periodically Double or Triple"	3:53
6.	"If It's True"	2:39
7.	"I'm on My Way"	4:35
8.	"When It's Dark"	3:54
9.	"All Your Secrets"	4:26
10.	"More Stars Than There Are in Heaven"	9:39
11.	"The Fireside"	11:25
12.	"And the Glitter Is Gone"	15:54

Bonus tracks

13. "You've Got a Friend" (Carole King) - 4:10 (Japanese CD, Argentine CD, Buy Early Get Now & iTunes bonus track)
14. "Nothing to Hide (Demo)" - 9:47 (Buy Early Get Now bonus track)
15. "Periodically Double or Triple (Demo)" - 7:39 (Buy Early Get Now bonus track)

== Personnel ==
String arrangements by Richard Evans

- David Angel, Pamela Sixfin - violin
- Monisa Angell, Kristin Wilkingson - viola
- John Catchings - cello
- recorded by John Mark Painter at IHOF in Nashville
- Doug Wieselman - clarinet

Produced by Roger Moutenot Mastered by Greg Calbi at Sterling Sound
