= I Am Not Afraid of You and I Will Beat Your Ass =

Studio album by Yo La Tengo
- Released: September 12, 2006
- Recorded: 2006
- Genres: Indie rock, avant-pop
- Length: 77:41
- Label: Matador
- Producer: Roger Moutenot

Yo La Tengo chronology
Summer Sun (2003)	I Am Not Afraid of You and I Will Beat Your Ass (2006)	They Shoot, We Score (2008)

Singles from I Am Not Afraid of You and I Will Beat Your Ass
- 1. "Mr. Tough" Released: October 10, 2006

I Am Not Afraid of You and I Will Beat Your Ass is the eleventh studio album by American indie rock band Yo La Tengo, released on September 12, 2006 by record label Matador.

== Content ==
The title of the album is rumored to be a (paraphrased) quote by NBA player Kurt Thomas. Sitting on the bench together during a game, Thomas was caught on tape by the MSG Network in a profane exchange with fellow Knick, point guard Stephon Marbury. Thomas yelled at Marbury, "Everyone in this organization is afraid of you, but I'm not, and I will beat your ass". (Note: Some contemporary sources attributed the quote to Knick Tim Thomas instead.)

== Release ==
The record was released on CD and as a double LP vinyl.

A 7" single for "Mr. Tough" was released in the UK, September 4, 2006. On the B-side there is a cover of "I'm Your Puppet" by James & Bobby Purify.

== Reception ==
Professional ratings
Aggregate scores
Source	Rating
Metacritic	85/100
Review scores
Source	Rating
AllMusic	4/5 stars
The A.V. Club	A−
Entertainment Weekly	A
The Guardian	4/5 stars
Mojo	4/5 stars
MSN Music (Consumer Guide)	A−
NME	6/10
Pitchfork	8.3/10
Rolling Stone	4/5 stars
Spin	4/5 stars

The album has received widespread acclaim and appeared in numerous "Best of 2006" lists, including:

- a rating of 85% on Metacritic
- appearing at number 13 on Metacritic's "Best of 2006" list.
- appearing at number 23 on Pitchfork's "Top 50 Albums of 2006"

== Track listing ==
All songs written by Georgia Hubley, Ira Kaplan and James McNew.

No.	Title	Vocals	Length
1.	"Pass the Hatchet, I Think I'm Goodkind"	Kaplan	10:47
2.	"Beanbag Chair"	Kaplan, Hubley	3:03
3.	"I Feel Like Going Home"	Hubley	4:14
4.	"Mr. Tough"	Kaplan	4:06
5.	"Black Flowers"	McNew	4:28
6.	"The Race Is on Again"	Hubley, Kaplan	4:37
7.	"The Room Got Heavy"	Hubley	5:10
8.	"Sometimes I Don't Get You"	Kaplan	3:16
9.	"Daphnia"	instrumental	8:51
10.	"I Should Have Known Better"	Kaplan, McNew	3:16
11.	"Watch Out for Me Ronnie"	Kaplan, McNew, Hubley	3:02
12.	"The Weakest Part"	Hubley, Kaplan	3:04
13.	"Song for Mahila"	Kaplan	3:40
14.	"Point and Shoot"	Kaplan, Hubley, McNew	4:18
15.	"The Story of Yo La Tango"	Kaplan	11:49

- The final track is a deliberate misspelling of the band's name — the album's CD-Text reiterating this by listing the track as "The Story of Yo La Tango", followed by the message "Yes — it should be Tango!". A recurring feature on the band's web site depicts venue marquees with various misspellings of the name.

== Personnel ==
Mastered by Greg Calbi at Sterling Sound.

- Steve Herrman – trumpet ("Mr. Tough", "Black Flowers")
- Jim Hoke – saxophone ("Mr. Tough", "Watch Out for Me Ronnie")
- Bill Huber – trombone ("Beanbag Chair", "Black Flowers") and euphonium ("Black Flowers")
- David Mansfield – violin ("I Feel Like Going Home", "Black Flowers")
- Roger Moutenot – acoustic guitar ("Song for Mahila")
- Garo Yellin – cello ("Black Flowers", "Watch Out for Me Ronnie")

Art

- Cover painting: Little Pink Lady by Gary Panter
- Photos by Reuben Cox
- Inlay photo of Ira as a kid was taken by Abraham Kaplan (Ira's father)
- Inlay photo of Ira and Georgia's dog, named Sydney, was taken by Georgia

== Charts ==
Chart (2006)	Peak position
French Albums (SNEP)	179
German Albums (Offizielle Top 100)	70
US Billboard 200	66
US Top Independent Albums (Billboard)	3
