= Today Is the Day (EP) =

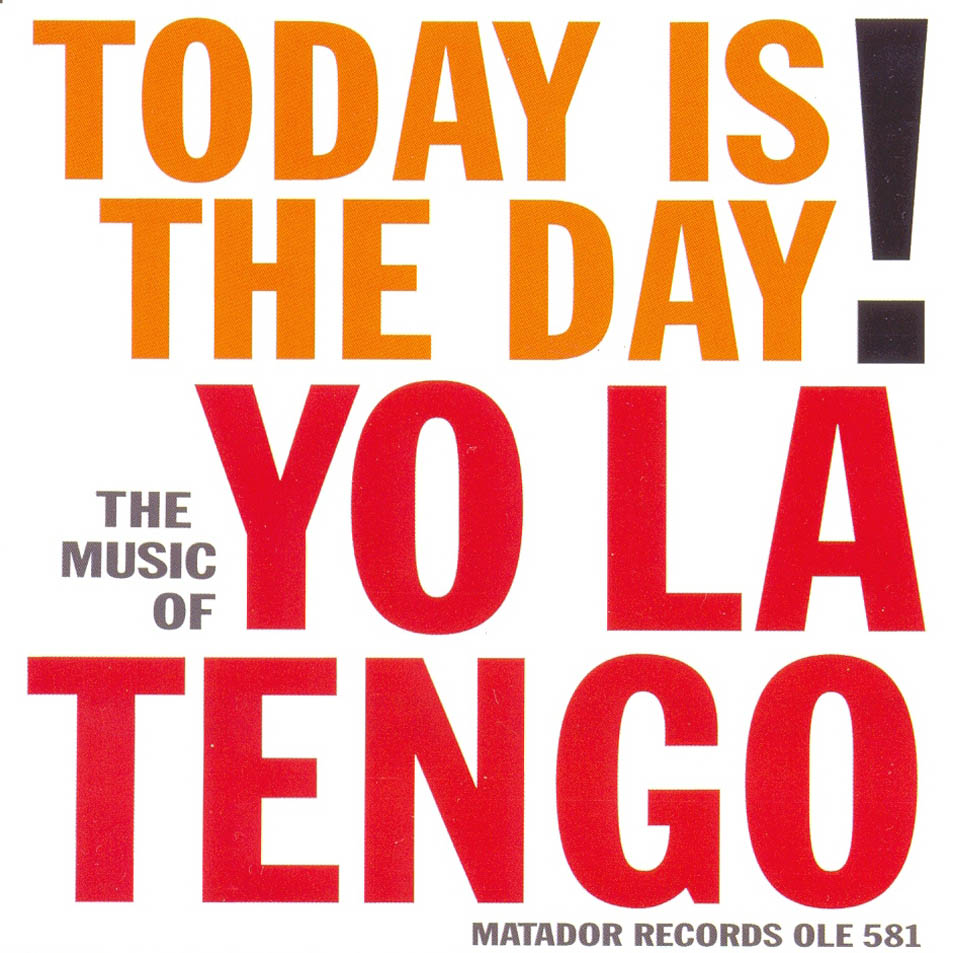

EP by Yo La Tengo
- Released: 2003
- Recorded: 1999–2002
- Genre: Indie rock
- Label: Matador Records
- Producer: Roger Moutenot

Professional ratings
Aggregate scores
Source	Rating
Metacritic	75/100
Review scores
Source	Rating
AllMusic	3/5 stars
Pitchfork	7.6/10
Rolling Stone	3/5 stars

Today Is the Day is an EP by Yo La Tengo, released in 2003 on Matador Records. The title track is a rock version of a song from the album Summer Sun.

The EP features a cover of the song “Needle of Death” by Bert Jansch. The album artwork imitates the artwork for Ornette Coleman’s Something Else!!!!.

== In popular culture ==
- The song "Today Is the Day" is featured in the video game Major League Baseball 2K6.

== Track listing ==
1. "Today Is the Day (Rock Version)" - 4:26
2. "Styles of the Times" - 4:19
3. "Outsmartener" - 2:56
4. "Needle of Death" (Bert Jansch cover) - 3:18
5. "Dr. Crash" - 2:37
6. "Cherry Chapstick" - 5:31
