= Stupid Things (Yo La Tengo song) =

Single by Yo La Tengo

from the album Fade
- Released: 2012
- Label: Matador Records

"Stupid Things" is a song by Yo La Tengo, released as a single in 2012 on Matador Records.

It was released as MP3 and FLAC downloads and as a limited edition run of 1500 copies in 45 RPM 12" vinyl.

The song is remixed by EYE of Boredoms.

== Track listing ==
No.	Title	Length
1.	"Stupid Things"	5:08
2.	"Stupid Things (remix by EYE)"	5:13
3.	"Stupid Things (original instrumental)"	11:58
