= Genius + Love = Yo La Tengo =

Compilation album by Yo La Tengo
- Released: September 10, 1996
- Genres: Indie rock; instrumental rock
- Length: 122:41
- Label: Matador

Yo La Tengo chronology
Electr-O-Pura (1995)	Genius + Love = Yo La Tengo (1996)	I Can Hear the Heart Beating as One (1997)

Professional ratings
Review scores
Source	Rating
AllMusic	3/5 stars
Christgau's Consumer Guide	(neither)
The Encyclopedia of Popular Music	3/5 stars
Entertainment Weekly	A
NME	7/10

Genius + Love = Yo La Tengo is a 2-disc album by Yo La Tengo, consisting of rarities, alternate versions, and out-takes, spanning 1988 to 1995. The album was released on Matador in 1996; a Japanese version with two extra tracks appeared in 1998.

The title is a pun on the 1961 Ray Charles album, Genius + Soul = Jazz. ("The Genius" was Charles' nickname.)

The first disc contains songs with vocals. There are several cover songs, such as John Cale's "Hanky Panky Nohow", The Velvet Underground's "I'm Set Free", Beat Happening's "Cast a Shadow", and Wire's "Too Late". The cover of Daniel Johnston's "Speeding Motorcycle" features Johnston calling in his vocals to the song via telephone. "Demons" originally appeared on the soundtrack to the 1995 film I Shot Andy Warhol (in which YLT appeared as a Velvet Underground-esque band).

The second disc consists entirely of instrumental pieces. Included are songs previously recorded by the group (such as an 8-second drum solo), and covers, such as the Urinals' "Surfin' with the Shah," and a wedding-band-like rendition of the Ramones' "Blitzkrieg Bop." "Sunsquashed" is a 26-minute psychedelic jam, from which one of the band's main fansites took its name.

== Track listing ==
=== Disc 1 ===
1. "Evanescent Psychic Pez Drop" – 2:48
2. "Demons" – 3:18
3. "Fog over Frisco" – 3:47
4. "Too Late" (Wire) – 5:57
5. "Hanky Panky Nohow" (John Cale) – 2:58
6. "Something to Do" – 2:11
7. "Ultra-Powerful Short Wave Radio Picks up Music from Venus" (feat. Jad Fair – written by David Fair and Yo La Tengo) – 1:31
8. "Up to You" – 4:03
9. "Somebody's Baby" (Jackson Browne, Danny Kortchmar) – 3:38
10. "Walking Away from You" – 5:58
11. "Artificial Heart" (Ernest Noyes Brookings, Kaplan) – 3:00
12. "Cast a Shadow" (Beat Happening) – 2:24
13. "I'm Set Free" (The Velvet Underground cover) – 4:10
14. "Barnaby, Hardly Working" – 3:54
15. "Some Kinda Fatigue" – 7:38
16. "Speeding Motorcycle" (feat. and written by Daniel Johnston) – 3:33

=== Disc 2 ===
1. "Nutricia" – 5:01
2. "Her Grandmother's Gift" – 2:39
3. "From a Motel 6, Pt. 2" – 4:29
4. "Gooseneck Problem" – 0:04
5. "Surfin' with the Shah" (Urinals) – 2:07
6. "Ecstasy Blues" – 2:47
7. "Too Much, Pt. 1" – 1:18
8. "Blitzkrieg Bop" (Ramones) – 2:18
9. "One Self: Fish Girl" – 5:31
10. "Enough" – 5:25
11. "Drum Solo" – 0:08
12. "From a Motel 6, Pt. 1" – 3:35
13. "Too Much, Pt. 2" – 0:21
14. "Sunsquashed" – 26:22
