= May I Sing with Me =

Studio album by Yo La Tengo
- Released: February 28, 1992
- Recorded: 1991: Fort Apache, Cambridge, Massachusetts; Water Music, Hoboken, New Jersey, United States
- Genres: Indie rock; noise rock; noise pop
- Length: 54:18
- Label: Alias
- Producer: Gene Holder

Yo La Tengo chronology
| Fakebook (1990) | May I Sing with Me (1992) | Painful (1993) |

Professional ratings
Review scores
| Source | Rating |
|---|---|
| AllMusic | 3/5 stars |
| Chicago Tribune | 3.5/4 stars |
| Christgau's Consumer Guide | (3-star Honorable Mention) |
| Encyclopedia of Popular Music | 3/5 stars |
| Entertainment Weekly | B− |
| The Rolling Stone Album Guide | 2/5 stars |
| Spin Alternative Record Guide | 5/10 |

May I Sing with Me is the fifth studio album by American indie rock band Yo La Tengo, released in February 1992 by record label Alias. This album is the first with their now-permanent bassist James McNew. The song "Five-Cornered Drone (Crispy Duck)" is a remake of the song "Crispy Duck" with different lyrics.

== Style ==
The album's sound has been described as an algamation of the "jangle-storm" of The Feelies and the sounds of noise pop.

== Track listing ==
| No. | Title | Writer(s) | Length |
|---|---|---|---|
| 1. | "Detouring America with Horns" | Hubley | 4:03 |
| 2. | "Upside-Down" | Kaplan | 2:38 |
| 3. | "Mushroom Cloud of Hiss" | Hubley, Kaplan | 9:25 |
| 4. | "Swing for Life" | Hubley, Kaplan | 5:06 |
| 5. | "Five-Cornered Drone (Crispy Duck)" | Hubley, Kaplan | 6:20 |
| 6. | "Some Kinda Fatigue" | Kaplan | 4:34 |
| 7. | "Always Something" | Hubley, Kaplan | 4:38 |
| 8. | "86-Second Blowout" | Kaplan | 1:32 |
| 9. | "Out the Window" | Kaplan | 4:00 |
| 10. | "Sleeping Pill" | Hubley, Kaplan, McNew | 9:44 |
| 11. | "Satellite" | Kaplan | 2:17 |

== Personnel ==
- Ira Kaplan – guitar, vocals
- James McNew – bass, occasional vocals, occasional guitar
- Georgia Hubley – drums, vocals, some feedback, cover art

Additional personnel

- Gene Holder – producer; bass (tracks 4, 5)
- Lou Giordano – engineer
- Carl Plaster – assistant engineer
- John Siket – engineer (tracks 4, 5); mixing engineer
- Greg Calbi – mastering
- John Halpern – front and back cover photos
