= James McNew =

American indie rock musician (born 1969)

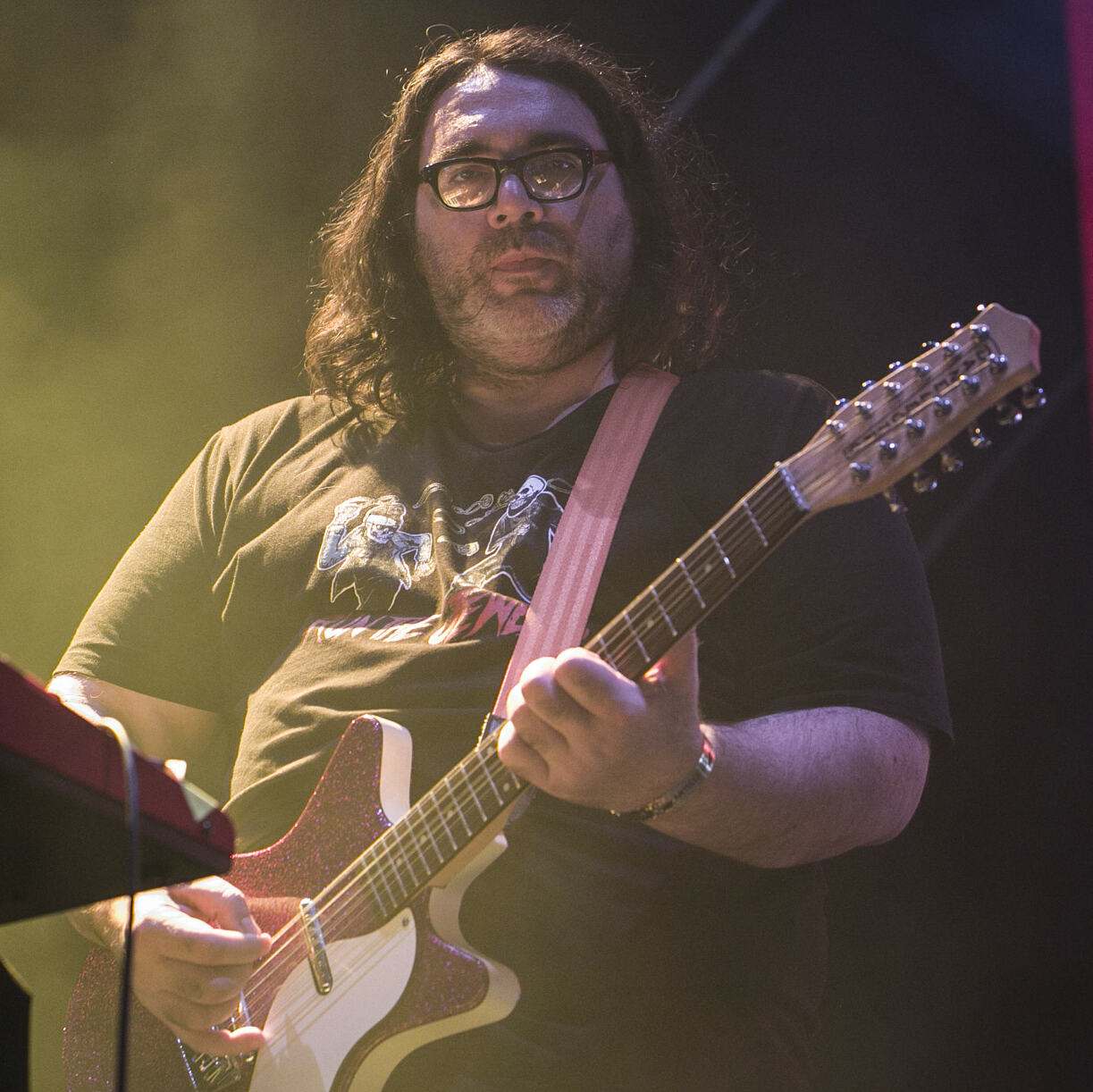
- James McNew performing with Yo La Tengo in 2017

Background information
- Born: July 6, 1969 (age 57); Baltimore, Maryland, United States
- Genres: Indie rock; indie pop
- Occupation: Musician
- Instrument: Bass guitar
- Years active: 1990–present
- Member of: Yo La Tengo; Dump
- Formerly of: Ectoslavia; Christmas

James McNew (born July 6, 1969) is an American musician who has played bass in the indie rock band Yo La Tengo since their 1992 album May I Sing with Me. Live, he also plays guitars, keyboards and drums.

He was previously a member of the band Christmas and was featured on their third album, Vortex. McNew also played in Ectoslavia, a predecessor to Pavement and the Silver Jews, in the early 1990s. He has a solo project called Dump.

The documentary The Parking Lot Movie highlighted McNew's career as a parking lot attendant in Charlottesville, Virginia, before his career as a musician.
