= Ira Kaplan =

Musical artist (born 1957)

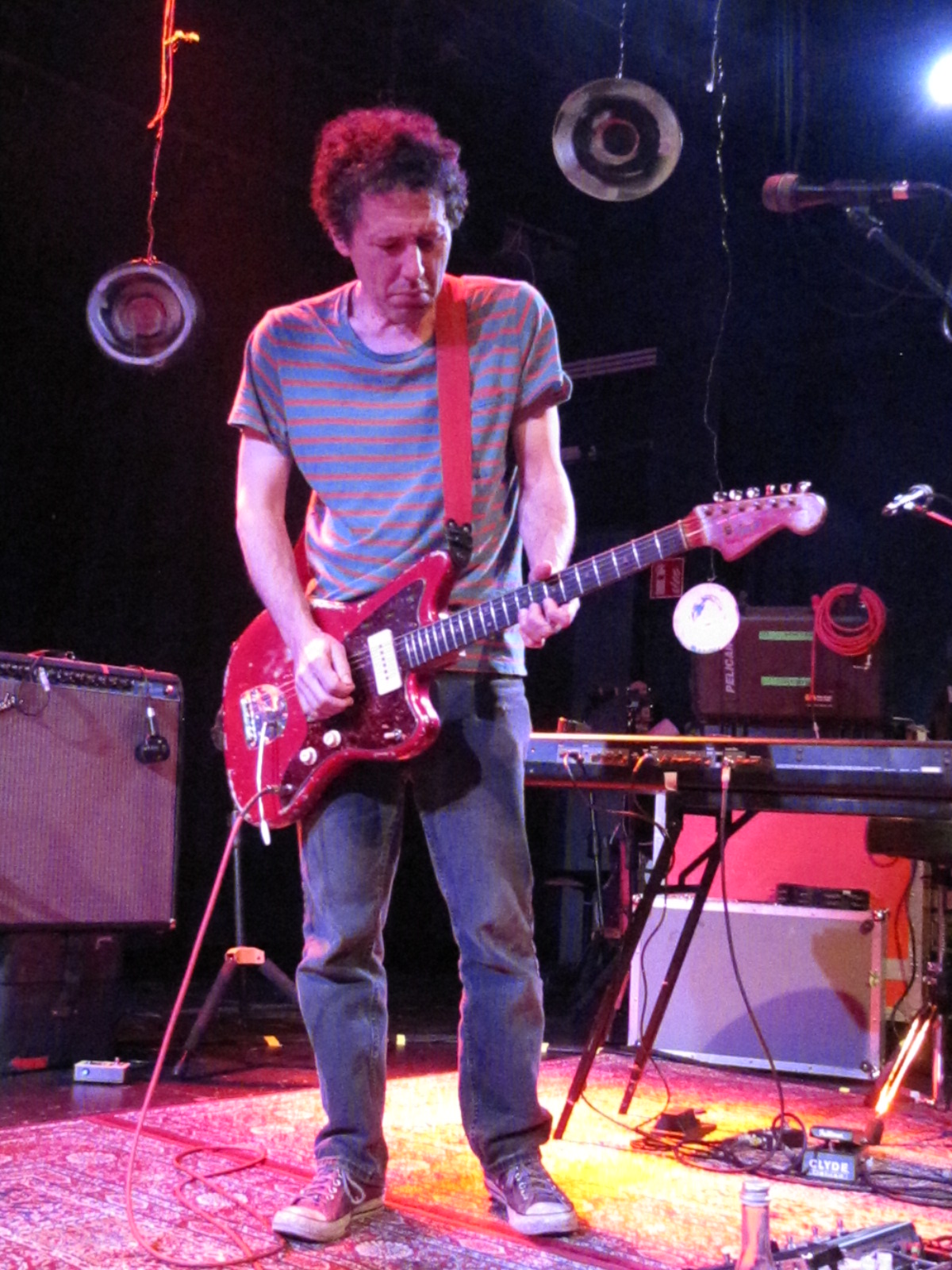
- Ira Kaplan in 2018

Background information
- Born: Ira David Kaplan; January 7, 1957 (age 69); Queens, New York, United States
- Genres: Indie rock
- Occupations: Singer-songwriter, musician
- Instruments: Vocals, guitar, piano
- Years active: 1984–present

Ira David Kaplan (born January 7, 1957) is a co-founder, vocalist, guitarist and songwriter in the American indie rock band Yo La Tengo. He is married to the band's co-founder Georgia Hubley.

A graduate of Sarah Lawrence College, Kaplan formed Yo La Tengo in the early 1980s. Previously, he worked as a music critic for the SoHo Weekly News, New York Rocker, Village Voice and Matter, as well as serving as a soundman, roadie and backup musician for Mofungo and other New York-area bands. Kaplan's life, family, and musical development were chronicled in the book Big Day Coming: Yo La Tengo and the Rise of Indie Rock, by Jesse Jarnow (Avery Books, 2012).

In 2012, Spin named Kaplan the 97th greatest guitarist of all time.

Kaplan's vocals were featured in Eluvium's 2013 album Nightmare Ending in the song "Happiness". He occasionally hosts a free-form radio program on WFMU under the name "Ira the K."
