= Georgia Hubley =

American drummer (born 1957)

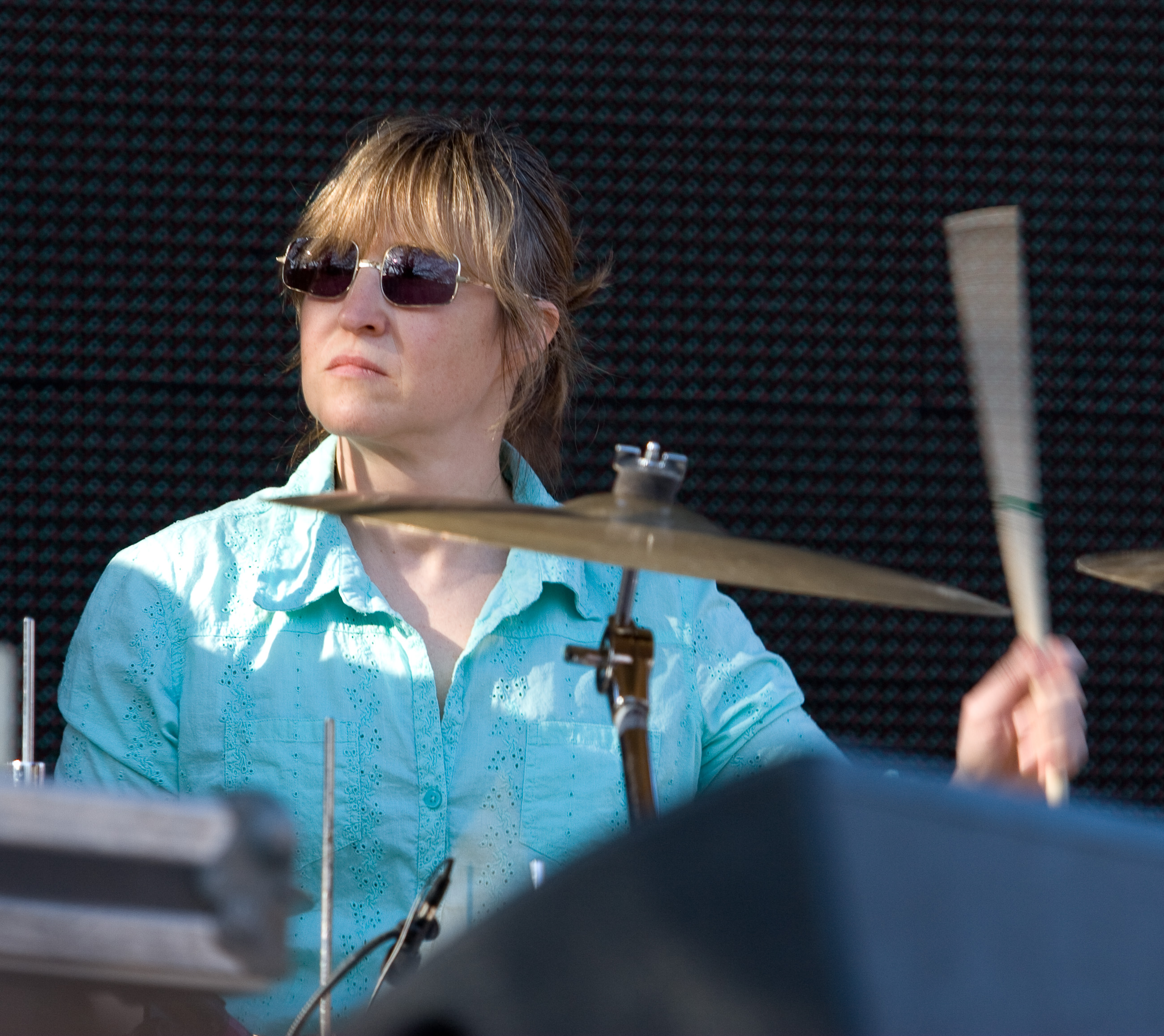
Hubley in 2007

Georgia Mira Hubley (born February 9, 1957) is an American percussionist, vocalist, and visual artist. She is one of the two founding members of the indie rock band Yo La Tengo, and is married to the group's other founding member, guitarist/vocalist Ira Kaplan, with whom she lives in Manhattan. The two would often see each other in record shops and at the same shows. They formed the band in 1984, and released their first album, Ride the Tiger, in 1986 on the Coyote label.

In addition to being the drummer and vocalist, Hubley has designed covers for the band's releases. She also plays occasional guitar, keyboard, and drum machine on the band's recordings.

Hubley is a daughter of UPA Studios animators John Hubley and Faith Elliott Hubley, and a sister of Emily Hubley.
