= List of UK top-ten singles in 2006 =

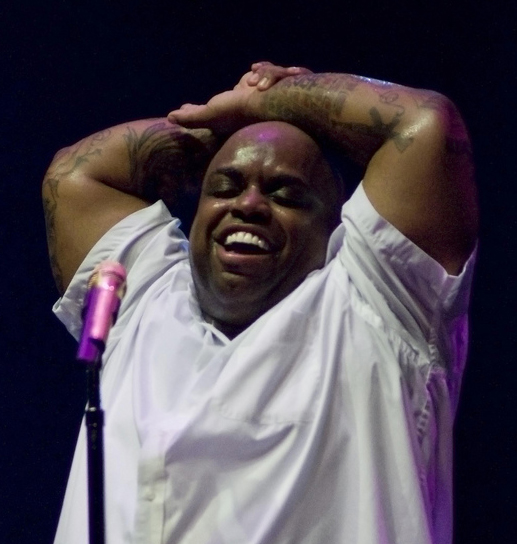
Gnarls Barkley (lead singer CeeLo Green pictured) had the best-selling single of 2006 with "Crazy", their debut single which reigned at number-one for nine weeks. Their other hit single this year was "Smiley Faces", which peaked at number 10.

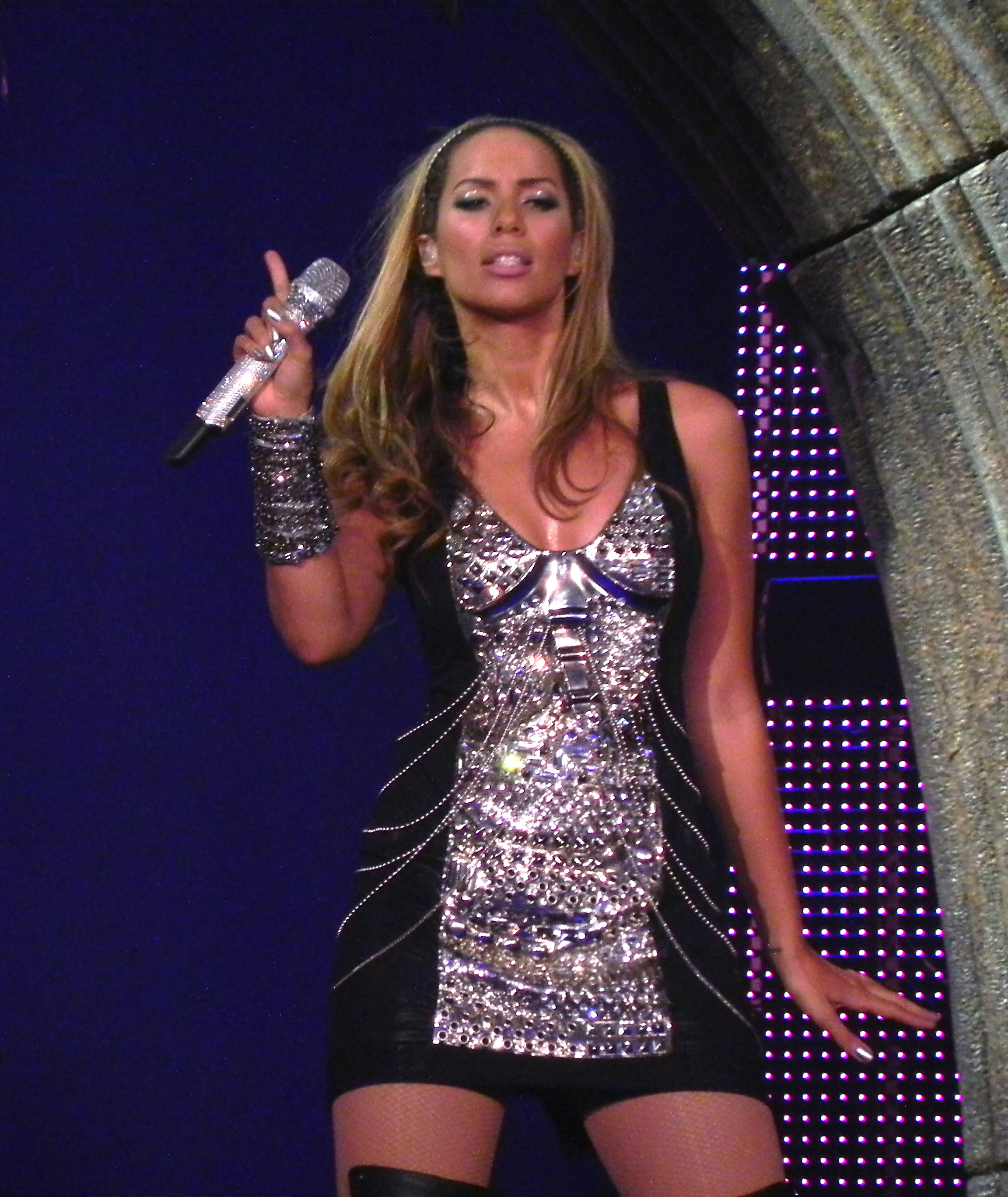
Leona Lewis, the winner of the third series of The X Factor, had the second best-selling song of the year with her winner's single and Christmas number one "A Moment Like This".

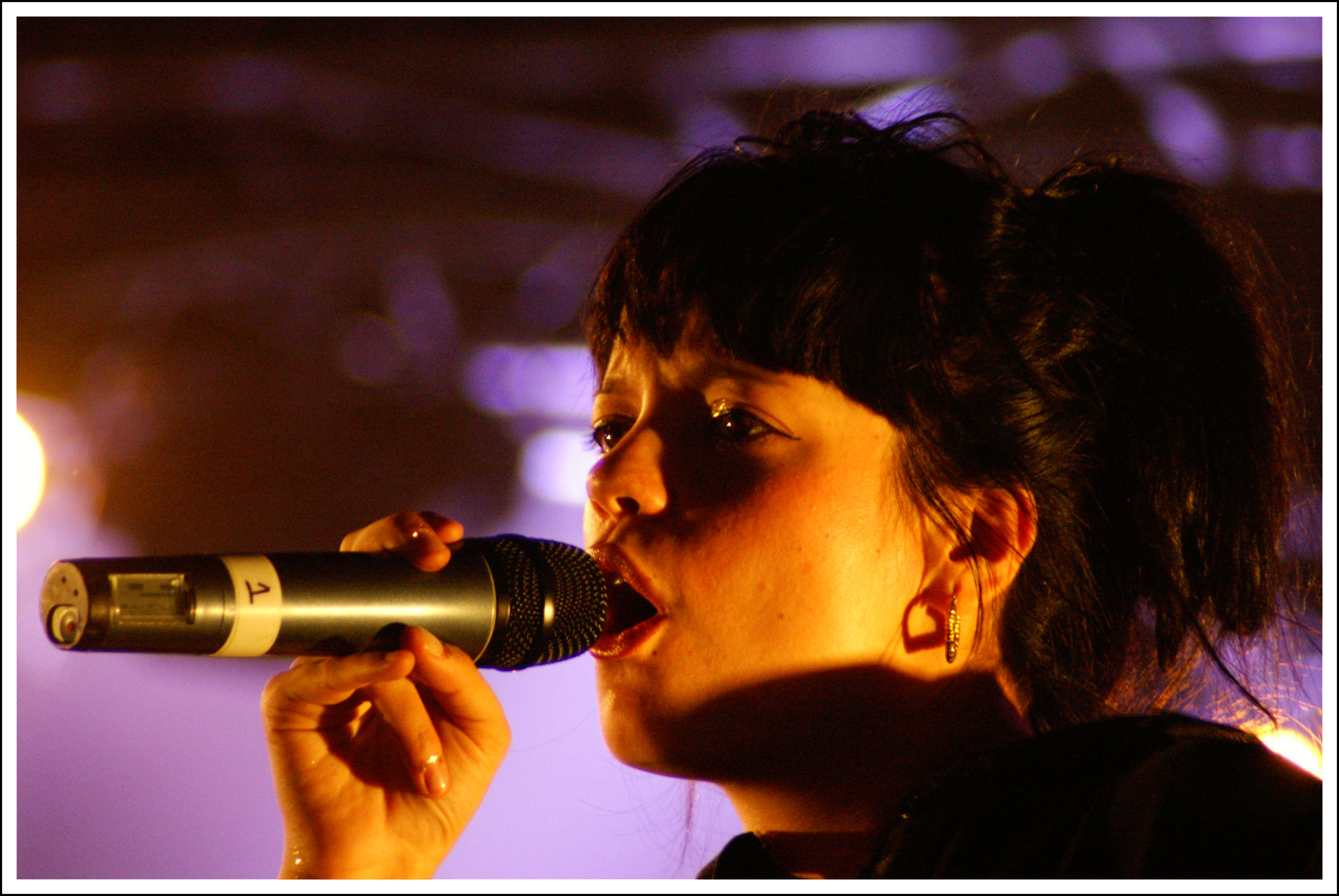
Lily Allen made the UK charts for the first time in 2006 with two singles making the countdown, including her number-one debut hit "Smile"

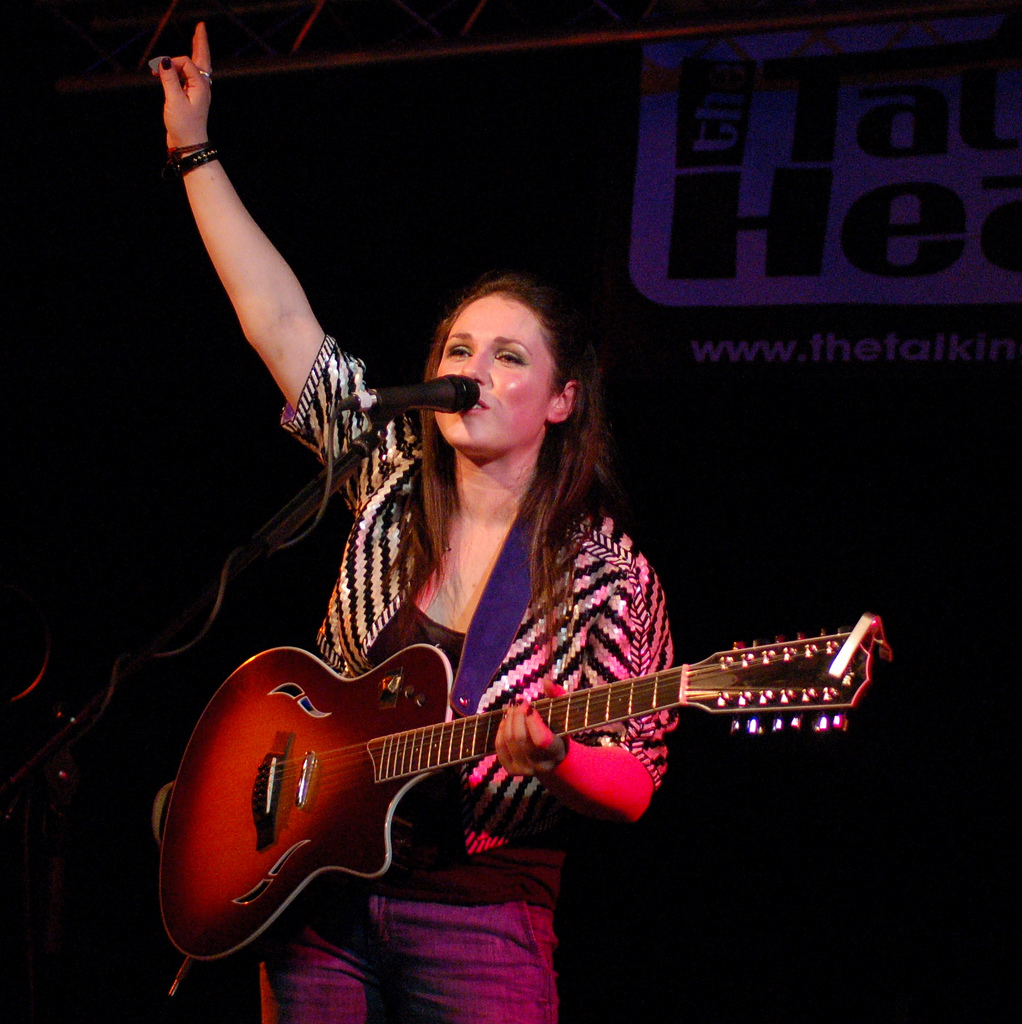
Scottish singer-songwriter Sandi Thom achieved her first and only top 10 single this year with "I Wish I Was a Punk Rocker (With Flowers in My Hair)", which spent a week at number-one in June and became the year's fifth best-selling single.

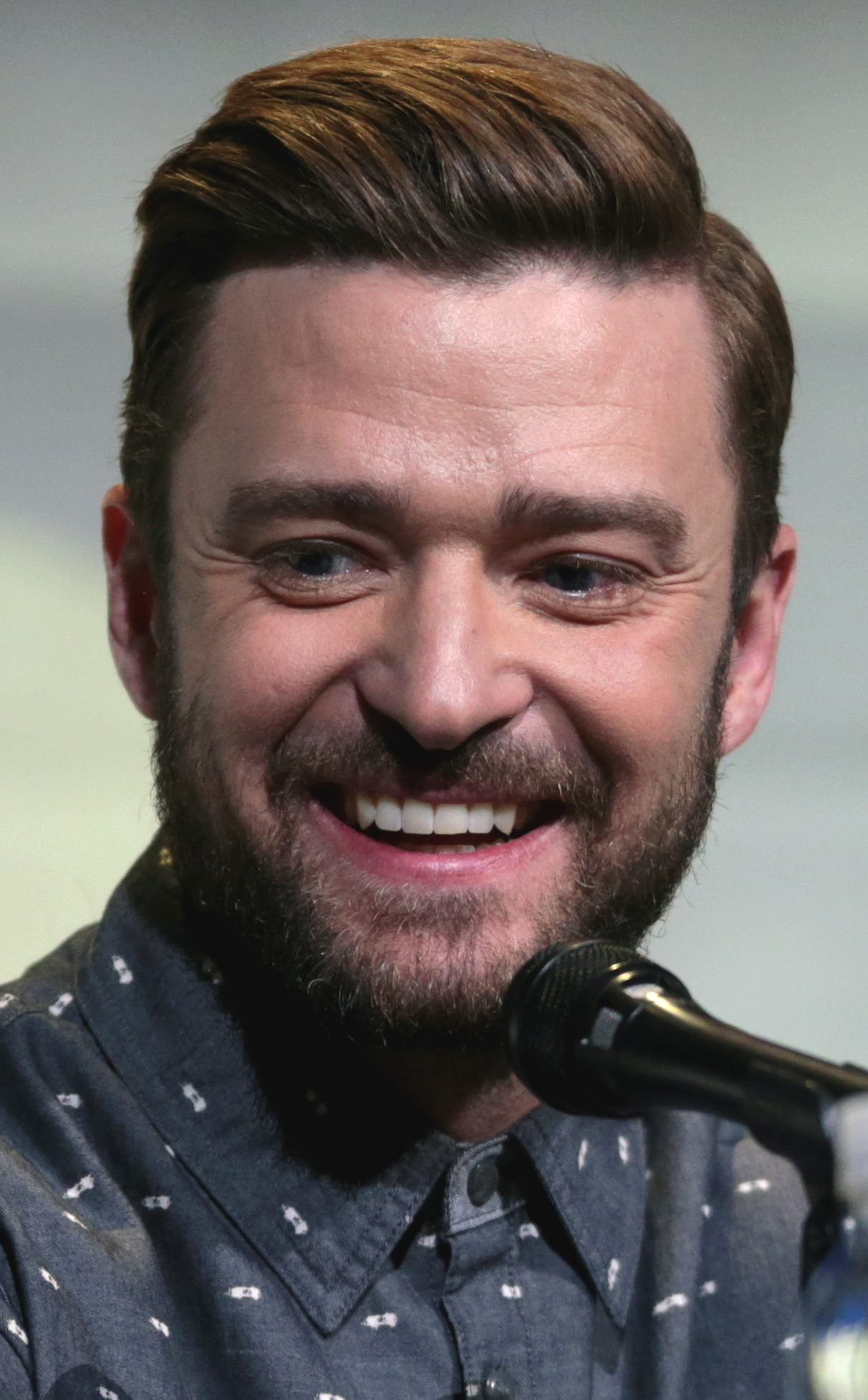
Justin Timberlake achieved two top 10 entries this year, including "SexyBack", which became his first UK number-one single.

The UK Singles Chart is one of many music charts compiled by the Official Charts Company that calculates the best-selling singles of the week in the United Kingdom. Since 2004 the chart has been based on the sales of both physical singles and digital downloads, with airplay figures excluded from the official chart. This list shows singles that peaked in the Top 10 of the UK Singles Chart during 2006, as well as singles which peaked in 2005 but were in the top 10 in 2006. The entry date is when the song appeared in the top 10 for the first time (week ending, as published by the Official Charts Company, which is six days after the chart is announced).

One-hundred and sixty-nine singles were in the top ten in 2006. Nine singles from 2005 remained in the top 10 for several weeks at the beginning of the year. "When I'm Gone" by Eminem was the only song from 2005 to reach its peak in 2006. Forty-two artists scored multiple entries in the top 10 in 2006. Amy Winehouse, Fall Out Boy, Lily Allen, Ne-Yo and Timbaland were among the many artists who achieved their first UK charting top 10 single in 2006.

The 2005 Christmas number-one, "That's My Goal" by 2005 X Factor winner Shayne Ward, remained at number-one for the first three weeks of 2006. The first new number-one single of the year was "When the Sun Goes Down" by Arctic Monkeys. Overall, twenty-five different singles peaked at number-one in 2006, with McFly (2) having the most singles hit that position.

== Background ==
=== Multiple entries ===
One-hundred and sixty-nine singles charted in 2006, with one-hundred and sixty singles reaching their peak this year (including the re-entries "Fairytale of New York", "Three Lions", "You Got the Love" and "You Spin Me Round" which charted in previous years but reached peaks on their latest chart run).

Forty-two artists scored multiple entries in the top 10 in 2006. American singer Nicole Scherzinger of The Pussycat Dolls had the most top ten singles in 2006 with five. Four of the singles were with her band, the exception being "Come to Me", her debut solo single and a collaboration with P. Diddy. The single peaked at number 4 on 14 October 2006, its first week of release, and spent four weeks in the top 10 in total. The best-performing single with The Pussycat Dolls was "Stickwitu" which had peaked at number-one in 2005. "Beep" reached a high of number 2, "Buttons" landed one place lower and "I Don't Need a Man" was at number seven.

Five artists made the top 10 on four occasions in 2006, including The Pussycat Dolls as a group. British girlband Girls Aloud's tally again included a holdover from 2005, their number 9 hit "See the Day". "Whole Lotta History" went to number six in March, "Something Kinda Oooh" was a top 3 entry in October, while the group finished the year with their number four cover of "I Think We're Alone Now", best known as a hit for Tiffany in 1987.

Madonna had another year of chart success. "Hung Up" had topped the rankings in 2005 but she also had three new entries in 2006. "Sorry" made number-one for a single week on 4 March 2006, "Get Together" reached number seven in August and "Jump" squeezed in at number 9 in November.

Fergie and will.i.am of Black Eyed Peas were the final artists with four top 10 hits this year. will.i.am guested on The Pussycat Dolls' "Buttons", while the other three singles were as part of the band. "My Humps" and "Pump It" both reached number three, and they also got together with Sergio Mendes for a new interpretation of his song Mas Que Nada, taking it to number 6 in July. Fergie's other hit single was her solo debut "London Bridge", which peaked at number three.

Boyband McFly were one of a number of artists with three top-ten entries, including number-one singles "Star Girl" and "Don't Stop Me Now"/"Please, Please" (for Sport Relief). Christina Aguilera, Beyoncé, The Black Eyed Peas, The Feeling, Nelly Furtado, The Ordinary Boys, P. Diddy, Pink and Sugababes were among the other artists who had multiple top 10 entries in 2006.

=== Chart debuts ===
Sixty-two artists achieved their first top 10 single in 2006, either as a lead or featured artist. Of these, ten went on to record another hit single that year: Beatfreakz, Fall Out Boy, The Fratellis, Gnarls Barkley, James Morrison, The Kooks, Lily Allen, Ne-Yo, Sunblock and The Zutons. The Feeling and The Ordinary Boys both had two other entries in their breakthrough year.

The following table (collapsed on desktop site) does not include acts who had previously charted as part of a group and secured their first top 10 solo single.

Artist	Number of top 10s	First entry	Chart position	Other entries
Brian Kennedy	1	"George Best – A Tribute"	4	—
Peter Corry	1	"George Best – A Tribute"	4	—
Editors	1	"Munich"	10	—
Sunblock	2	"I'll Be Ready"	4	"First Time" (9)
José González	1	"Heartbeats"	9	—
Jagged Edge	1	"Nasty Girl"	1	—
Avery Storm	1	"Nasty Girl"	1	—
The Ordinary Boys	3	"Boys Will Be Boys"	3	"Lonely at the Top" (10), "Nine2Five" (6)
Chris Brown	1	"Run It!"	2	—
Meck	1	"Thunder in My Heart Again"	1	—
Fall Out Boy	2	"Sugar, We're Goin Down"	8	"Dance, Dance" (8)
Corinne Bailey Rae	1	"Put Your Records On"	2	—
Chico	1	"It's Chico Time"	1	—
Orson	1	"No Tomorrow"	1	—
The Feeling	3	"Sewn"	7	"Fill My Little World" (10), "Never Be Lonely" (9)
Lupe Fiasco	1	"Touch the Sky"	6	—
Ne-Yo	2	"So Sick"	1	"Sexy Love" (5)
Gnarls Barkley	2	"Crazy"	1	"Smiley Faces" (10)
The Kooks	2	"Naïve"	5	"She Moves in Her Own Way" (7)
The Zutons	2	"Why Won't You Give Me Your Love?"	9	"Valerie" (9)
Infernal	1	"From Paris to Berlin"	2	—
The Raconteurs	1	"Steady, As She Goes"	4	—
Dirty Pretty Things	1	"Bang Bang You're Dead"	5	—
Beatfreakz	2	"Somebody's Watching Me"	3	"Superfreak" (7)
Young Jeezy	1	"Say I"	4	—
Sandi Thom	1	"I Wish I Was a Punk Rocker (With Flowers in My Hair)"	1	—
Lady Sovereign	1	"Nine2Five"	6	—
Daz Sampson	1	"Teenage Life"	8	—
Kate Rusby	1	"All Over Again"	6	—
Brittany Murphy	1	"Faster Kill Pussycat"	7	—
The Automatic	1	"Monster"	4	—
The Special Assembly	1	"Hurry Up England - The People's Anthem"	10	—
Sérgio Mendes	1	"Mas Que Nada"	6	—
Lily Allen	2	"Smile"	1	"LDN" (6)
Paolo Nutini	1	"Last Request"	5	—
Steve Edwards	1	"World, Hold On (Children of the Sky)"	9	—
Rogue Traders	1	"Voodoo Child"	3	—
James Morrison	2	"You Give Me Something"	5	"Wonderful World" (8)
Fedde Le Grand	1	"Put Your Hands Up 4 Detroit"	1	—
Paris Hilton	1	"Stars Are Blind"	5	—
Chamillionaire	1	"Ridin'"	2	—
Krayzie Bone	1	"Ridin'"	2	—
David Guetta	1	"Love Don't Let Me Go (Walking Away)"	3	—
The Egg	1	"Love Don't Let Me Go (Walking Away)"	3	—
Cassie	1	"Me & U"	6	—
Micky Modelle	1	"Dancing in the Dark"	10	—
Jessy	1	"Dancing in the Dark"	10	—
The Fratellis	2	"Chelsea Dagger"	5	"Whistle for the Choir"
Timbaland	1	"Promiscuous"	3	—
Lil' Chris	1	"Checkin' It Out"	3	—
Cast of High School Musical	1	"Breaking Free"	9	—
David Hasselhoff	1	"Jump in My Car"	3	—
Cutee B	1	"Rock This Party (Everybody Dance Now)"	3	—
My Chemical Romance	1	"Welcome to the Black Parade"	1	—
Marion Raven	1	"It's All Coming Back to Me Now"	6	—
Amy Winehouse	1	"Rehab"	7	—
Bodyrox	1	"Yeah Yeah"	2	—
Luciana	1	"Yeah Yeah"	2	—
Booty Luv	1	"Boogie 2nite"	2	—
LazyTown	1	"Bing Bang (Time to Dance)"	4	—
Chris Cornell	1	"You Know My Name"	7	—
Leona Lewis	1	"A Moment Like This"	1	—

Notes

The dance music production team Klubbheads previously charted at number 10 with "Klubbhopping" in 1996 but entered the chart under the alias Hi_Tack for the first time in 2006. Liz McClarnon had multiple chart entries, including three number-ones, as part of Atomic Kitten, but "Woman in Love"/"I Get the Sweetest Feeling" marked her solo chart debut.

will.i.am recorded his first single independent of The Black Eyed Peas, guesting on The Pussycat Dolls song "Buttons" which peaked at number two. Fellow bandmate Fergie also launched her solo career in 2006 with "London Bridge", a number three entry. The Raconteurs included Jack White, who was also a member of The White Stripes. His first chart hit was "Seven Nation Army" in 2003 but "Steady, As She Goes" was his first single with his new band.

Matt Willis tasted chart success outside Busted for the first time in 2006, as "Up All Night" reached number 7. Cherise Roberts and Nadia Shepherd charted under the name Booty Luv, having previously recorded hit singles as part of Big Brovaz.

Nicole Scherzinger of The Pussycat Dolls collaborated with P. Diddy on "Come to Me" in 2006.

=== Songs from films ===
Original songs from various films entered the top 10 throughout the year. These included "Breaking Free" (from High School Musical), "You Know My Name" (Casino Royale), and "Friday Night" (Night at the Museum). "Check on It" was also recorded for The Pink Panther but never made the soundtrack.

=== Charity singles ===
A number of singles recorded for charity reached the top 10 in the charts in 2006. The Sport Relief single was the double-A side "Don't Stop Me Now" (a cover of the Queen song) and "Please, Please" by McFly, peaking at number on one 29 July 2006.

Emma Bunton recorded the Children in Need single for 2006, a cover of the Petula Clark song "Downtown". It was the eighth solo top 10 single of her career and reached number three on 2 December 2006.

U2 and Green Day produced the single "The Saints Are Coming", in aid of relief efforts following Hurricane Katrina, which caused destruction and devastation especially in New Orleans but also across the United States. It peaked at number two on its second week of release, on 18 November 2006.

=== Best-selling singles ===
Gnarls Barkley had the best-selling single of the year with "Crazy". The song spent eleven weeks in the top 10 (including nine weeks at number one), sold about 820,000 copies and was certified by the BPI. "A Moment Like This" by Leona Lewis came in second place, selling more than 700,000 copies and losing out by around 120,000 sales. Shakira featuring Wyclef Jean's "Hips Don't Lie", "I Don't Feel Like Dancin'" from Scissor Sisters and "I Wish I Was a Punk Rocker (With Flowers in My Hair)" by Sandi Thom made up the top five. Singles by Infernal, Nelly Furtado, Take That, Rihanna and Justin Timberlake were also in the top ten best-selling singles of the year.

== Top-ten singles ==
Key

Symbol	Meaning
‡	Single peaked in 2005 but still in chart in 2006.
(#)	Year-end top ten single position and rank
Entered	The date that the single first appeared in the chart.
Peak	Highest position that the single reached in the UK Singles Chart.

Entered (week ending)	Weeks in top 10	Single	Artist	Peak	Peak reached (week ending)	Weeks at peak
Singles in 2005
19 November 2005	10	"Hung Up"‡	Madonna	1	19 November 2005	3
26 November 2005	8	"My Humps"‡	Black Eyed Peas	3	26 November 2005	2
10 December 2005	6	"Stickwitu"‡	The Pussycat Dolls	1	10 December 2005	2
17 December 2005	4	"Ugly"‡	Sugababes	3	17 December 2005	1
24 December 2005	8	"JCB Song"‡	Nizlopi	1	24 December 2005	1
31 December 2005	8	"That's My Goal"‡	Shayne Ward	1	31 December 2005	4
31 December 2005	4	"Fairytale of New York"‡ ^{[A]}^{[B]}	The Pogues featuring Kirsty MacColl	3	31 December 2005	1
31 December 2005	4	"When I'm Gone"	Eminem	4	7 January 2006	1
31 December 2005	2	"See the Day"‡	Girls Aloud	9	31 December 2005	1
Singles in 2006
7 January 2006	2	"Goodbye My Lover"	James Blunt	9	7 January 2006	2
14 January 2006	2	"George Best – A Tribute"	Brian Kennedy & Peter Corry	4	14 January 2006	1
14 January 2006	1	"Munich"	Editors	10	14 January 2006	1
21 January 2006	2	"Break the Night with Colour"	Richard Ashcroft	3	21 January 2006	1
21 January 2006	3	"I'll Be Ready"	Sunblock	4	21 January 2006	1
21 January 2006	1	"Sleep"	Texas	6	21 January 2006	1
21 January 2006	1	"Heartbeats"	José González	9	21 January 2006	1
28 January 2006	3	"When the Sun Goes Down"	Arctic Monkeys	1	28 January 2006	1
28 January 2006	8	"Nasty Girl"	The Notorious B.I.G. featuring Diddy, Nelly, Jagged Edge & Avery Storm	1	4 February 2006	2
28 January 2006	4	"All Time Love"	Will Young	3	28 January 2006	1
28 January 2006	5	"Check on It"	Beyoncé	3	4 February 2006	1
28 January 2006	5	"Say Say Say (Waiting 4 U)"	Hi_Tack	4	4 February 2006	1
28 January 2006	1	"Eddie's Song"	Son of Dork	10	28 January 2006	1
4 February 2006	5	"Boys Will Be Boys"	The Ordinary Boys	3	11 February 2006	3
4 February 2006	1	"Analogue (All I Want)"	A-ha	10	4 February 2006	1
11 February 2006	5	"Run It!"	Chris Brown featuring Juelz Santana	2	11 February 2006	1
11 February 2006	3	"You Spin Me Round (Like a Record)" ^{[C]}	Dead or Alive	5	11 February 2006	2
18 February 2006	6	"Thunder in My Heart Again"	Meck featuring Leo Sayer	1	18 February 2006	2
18 February 2006	3	"You Got the Love (New Voyager Mix)" ^{[D]}	The Source featuring Candi Staton	7	18 February 2006	1
18 February 2006	3	"Sugar, We're Goin Down"	Fall Out Boy	8	18 February 2006	1
25 February 2006	1	"Woman in Love"/"I Get the Sweetest Feeling"	Liz McClarnon	5	25 February 2006	1
4 March 2006	4	"Sorry"	Madonna	1	4 March 2006	1
4 March 2006	6	"Put Your Records On"	Corinne Bailey Rae	2	4 March 2006	1
4 March 2006	1	"Amazing"	Westlife	4	4 March 2006	1
4 March 2006	1	"Is It Just Me?"	The Darkness	8	4 March 2006	1
11 March 2006	4	"It's Chico Time"	Chico	1	11 March 2006	2
11 March 2006	7	"Beep"	The Pussycat Dolls featuring will.i.am	2	11 March 2006	1
11 March 2006	8	"No Tomorrow"	Orson	1	25 March 2006	1
11 March 2006	2	"Sewn"	The Feeling	7	11 March 2006	1
11 March 2006	1	"Don't Bother"	Shakira	9	11 March 2006	1
18 March 2006	3	"Red Dress"	Sugababes	4	18 March 2006	1
18 March 2006	3	"Touch the Sky"	Kanye West featuring Lupe Fiasco	6	18 March 2006	1
25 March 2006	6	"Pump It"	Black Eyed Peas	3	25 March 2006	1
25 March 2006	1	"Whole Lotta History"	Girls Aloud	6	25 March 2006	1
1 April 2006	5	"So Sick"	Ne-Yo	1	1 April 2006	1
1 April 2006	3	"Nature's Law"	Embrace	2	1 April 2006	1
1 April 2006	3	"Stupid Girls"	Pink	4	1 April 2006	1
8 April 2006	11	"Crazy" (#1)	Gnarls Barkley	1	8 April 2006	9
8 April 2006	1	"You Have Killed Me"	Morrissey	3	8 April 2006	1
8 April 2006	5	"Naïve"	The Kooks	5	15 April 2006	1
8 April 2006	1	"When You Wasn't Famous"	The Streets	8	8 April 2006	1
15 April 2006	4	"One"	Mary J. Blige & U2	2	15 April 2006	1
15 April 2006	1	"Why Won't You Give Me Your Love?"	The Zutons	9	15 April 2006	1
22 April 2006	6	"No Promises"	Shayne Ward	2	22 April 2006	1
22 April 2006	7	"SOS" (#9)	Rihanna	2	29 April 2006	2
29 April 2006	11	"From Paris to Berlin" (#6)	Infernal	2	27 May 2006	1
29 April 2006	1	"Dance, Dance"	Fall Out Boy	8	29 April 2006	1
6 May 2006	2	"Steady, As She Goes"	The Raconteurs	4	6 May 2006	1
6 May 2006	2	"Bang Bang You're Dead"	Dirty Pretty Things	5	6 May 2006	1
6 May 2006	2	"You're All I Have"	Snow Patrol	7	6 May 2006	1
6 May 2006	3	"Stoned in Love"	Chicane featuring Tom Jones	7	13 May 2006	1
13 May 2006	3	"Dani California"	Red Hot Chili Peppers	2	13 May 2006	1
13 May 2006	3	"Somebody's Watching Me"	Beatfreakz	3	13 May 2006	1
20 May 2006	4	"Control Myself"	LL Cool J featuring Jennifer Lopez	2	20 May 2006	1
20 May 2006	1	"I'm with Stupid"	Pet Shop Boys	8	20 May 2006	1
27 May 2006	1	"Say I"	Christina Milian featuring Young Jeezy	4	27 May 2006	1
27 May 2006	1	"Touch It"	Busta Rhymes	6	27 May 2006	1
27 May 2006	1	"First Time"	Sunblock featuring Robin Beck	9	27 May 2006	1
3 June 2006	9	"I Wish I Was a Punk Rocker (With Flowers in My Hair)" (#5)	Sandi Thom	1	10 June 2006	1
3 June 2006	2	"Country Girl"	Primal Scream	5	3 June 2006	1
3 June 2006	1	"Nine2Five"	The Ordinary Boys vs. Lady Sovereign	6	3 June 2006	1
3 June 2006	1	"Up All Night"	Matt Willis	7	3 June 2006	1
3 June 2006	1	"Teenage Life" ^{[D]}	Daz Sampson	8	3 June 2006	1
3 June 2006	1	"Fill My Little World"	The Feeling	10	3 June 2006	1
10 June 2006	2	"Is It Any Wonder?"	Keane	3	10 June 2006	1
10 June 2006	4	"Who Knew"	Pink	5	10 June 2006	1
10 June 2006	1	"All Over Again"	Ronan Keating & Kate Rusby	6	10 June 2006	1
10 June 2006	1	"Faster Kill Pussycat"	Paul Oakenfold featuring Brittany Murphy	7	10 June 2006	1
10 June 2006	9	"Maneater" (#7)	Nelly Furtado	1	17 June 2006	3
17 June 2006	2	"World at Your Feet"	Embrace	3	17 June 2006	1
17 June 2006	4	"Monster"	The Automatic	4	17 June 2006	2
17 June 2006	1	"(Is This the Way to) The World Cup"	Tony Christie	8	17 June 2006	1
17 June 2006	2	"Three Lions" ^{[E]}	Baddiel, Skinner & The Lightning Seeds	9	24 June 2006	1
24 June 2006	16	"Hips Don't Lie" (#3)	Shakira featuring Wyclef Jean	1	8 July 2006	5
24 June 2006	1	"Who Says You Can't Go Home"	Bon Jovi	5	24 June 2006	1
24 June 2006	1	"Hurry Up England - The People's Anthem"	Sham 69 & The Special Assembly	10	24 June 2006	1
1 July 2006	2	"Supermassive Black Hole"	Muse	4	1 July 2006	1
1 July 2006	2	"Mas que Nada"	Sérgio Mendes featuring Black Eyed Peas	6	1 July 2006	1
1 July 2006	1	"Rooftops (A Liberation Broadcast)"	Lostprophets	8	1 July 2006	1
1 July 2006	1	"Valerie"	The Zutons	9	1 July 2006	1
8 July 2006	3	"Buttons"	The Pussycat Dolls featuring Snoop Dogg	3	8 July 2006	1
8 July 2006	3	"Sexy Love"	Ne-Yo	5	8 July 2006	1
8 July 2006	2	"She Moves in Her Own Way"	The Kooks	7	8 July 2006	1
15 July 2006	6	"Smile"	Lily Allen	1	15 July 2006	2
15 July 2006	2	"In the Morning"	Razorlight	3	15 July 2006	1
15 July 2006	5	"Last Request"	Paolo Nutini	5	15 July 2006	1
15 July 2006	1	"World, Hold On (Children of the Sky)"	Bob Sinclar featuring Steve Edwards	9	15 July 2006	1
22 July 2006	6	"Voodoo Child"	Rogue Traders	3	22 July 2006	1
22 July 2006	1	"I Love My Chick"	Busta Rhymes featuring will.i.am & Kelis	8	22 July 2006	1
29 July 2006	2	"Don't Stop Me Now"/"Please, Please" ^{[F]}	McFly	1	29 July 2006	1
29 July 2006	5	"Unfaithful"	Rihanna	2	29 July 2006	2
29 July 2006	6	"You Give Me Something"	James Morrison	5	29 July 2006	3
29 July 2006	1	"Smiley Faces"	Gnarls Barkley	10	29 July 2006	1
5 August 2006	4	"Ain't No Other Man"	Christina Aguilera	2	5 August 2006	1
5 August 2006	1	"Get Together"	Madonna	7	5 August 2006	1
5 August 2006	2	"Empire"	Kasabian	9	5 August 2006	1
12 August 2006	6	"Everytime We Touch"	Cascada	2	19 August 2006	1
12 August 2006	2	"Stars Are Blind"	Paris Hilton	5	12 August 2006	1
19 August 2006	7	"Chasing Cars" ^{[G]}	Snow Patrol	6	16 September 2006	1
26 August 2006	4	"Ridin'"	Chamillionaire featuring Krayzie Bone	2	26 August 2006	1
26 August 2006	3	"Love Don't Let Me Go (Walking Away)"	David Guetta vs. The Egg	3	26 August 2006	1
26 August 2006	2	"Leave Before the Lights Come On"	Arctic Monkeys	4	26 August 2006	1
26 August 2006	3	"Me & U"	Cassie	6	26 August 2006	2
26 August 2006	1	"Dancing in the Dark"	Micky Modelle vs. Jessy	10	26 August 2006	1
2 September 2006	3	"Déjà Vu"	Beyoncé featuring Jay-Z	1	2 September 2006	1
9 September 2006	7	"SexyBack" (#10)	Justin Timberlake	1	9 September 2006	1
9 September 2006	9	"I Don't Feel Like Dancin'" (#4)	Scissor Sisters	1	16 September 2006	4
9 September 2006	1	"Chelsea Dagger"	The Fratellis	5	9 September 2006	1
16 September 2006	4	"Promiscuous"	Nelly Furtado featuring Timbaland	3	16 September 2006	1
16 September 2006	2	"Rudebox"	Robbie Williams	4	16 September 2006	1
16 September 2006	1	"It's Not That Easy"	Lemar	7	16 September 2006	1
16 September 2006	2	"Never Be Lonely"	The Feeling	9	16 September 2006	2
23 September 2006	2	"London Bridge"	Fergie	3	23 September 2006	1
23 September 2006	5	"When You Were Young"	The Killers	2	30 September 2006	2
23 September 2006	2	"Something About You"	Jamelia	9	30 September 2006	1
30 September 2006	1	"U + Ur Hand"	Pink	10	30 September 2006	1
7 October 2006	4	"Checkin' It Out"	Lil' Chris	3	7 October 2006	1
7 October 2006	2	"Call Me When You're Sober"	Evanescence	4	7 October 2006	1
7 October 2006	2	"LDN"	Lily Allen	6	7 October 2006	1
7 October 2006	1	"I Don't Need a Man"	The Pussycat Dolls	7	7 October 2006	1
7 October 2006	1	"Breaking Free"	Cast of High School Musical	9	7 October 2006	1
14 October 2006	5	"America"	Razorlight	1	14 October 2006	1
14 October 2006	2	"Jump in My Car"	David Hasselhoff	3	14 October 2006	1
14 October 2006	4	"Come to Me"	P. Diddy featuring Nicole Scherzinger	4	14 October 2006	1
14 October 2006	5	"Rock This Party (Everybody Dance Now)"	Bob Sinclar & Cutee B featuring Dollarman, Big Ali & Makedah	3	28 October 2006	1
21 October 2006	5	"Welcome to the Black Parade"	My Chemical Romance	1	21 October 2006	2
21 October 2006	1	"Superfreak"	Beatfreakz	7	21 October 2006	1
28 October 2006	5	"Something Kinda Ooooh" ^{[I]}	Girls Aloud	3	4 November 2006	2
28 October 2006	2	"It's All Coming Back to Me Now"	Meat Loaf featuring Marion Raven	6	28 October 2006	1
28 October 2006	1	"Wonderful World"	James Morrison	8	28 October 2006	1
28 October 2006	1	"Lonely at the Top"	The Ordinary Boys	10	28 October 2006	1
4 November 2006	2	"Star Girl"	McFly	1	4 November 2006	1
4 November 2006	7	"Put Your Hands Up 4 Detroit"	Fedde Le Grand	1	11 November 2006	1
4 November 2006	7	"Irreplaceable"	Beyoncé	4	11 November 2006	1
4 November 2006	2	"Rehab"	Amy Winehouse	7	4 November 2006	2
11 November 2006	3	"Yeah Yeah"	Bodyrox featuring Luciana	2	11 November 2006	1
11 November 2006	3	"The Saints Are Coming" ^{[J]}	U2 & Green Day	2	18 November 2006	1
18 November 2006	3	"The Rose"	Westlife	1	18 November 2006	1
18 November 2006	3	"Rock Steady"	All Saints	3	18 November 2006	1
18 November 2006	1	"Easy"	Sugababes	8	18 November 2006	1
18 November 2006	1	"Jump"	Madonna	9	18 November 2006	1
25 November 2006	9	"Smack That"	Akon featuring Eminem	1	25 November 2006	1
25 November 2006	4	"My Love"	Justin Timberlake featuring T.I.	2	25 November 2006	1
25 November 2006	11	"Patience" (#8) ^{[K]}	Take That	1	2 December 2006	4
25 November 2006	1	"Lovelight"	Robbie Williams	8	25 November 2006	1
2 December 2006	2	"Downtown" ^{[L]}	Emma Bunton	3	2 December 2006	1
9 December 2006	8	"Boogie 2nite"	Booty Luv	2	16 December 2006	1
9 December 2006	2	"All Good Things (Come to an End)"	Nelly Furtado	4	9 December 2006	1
9 December 2006	1	"Whistle for the Choir"	The Fratellis	9	9 December 2006	1
9 December 2006	1	"Knights of Cydonia"	Muse	10	9 December 2006	1
16 December 2006	2	"Bing Bang (Time to Dance)"	LazyTown	4	16 December 2006	1
16 December 2006	3	"Wind It Up" ^{[M]}	Gwen Stefani	3	23 December 2006	1
16 December 2006	1	"Beware of the Dog"	Jamelia	10	16 December 2006	1
23 December 2006	2	"21st Century Christmas"/"Move It"	Cliff Richard	2	23 December 2006	1
23 December 2006	5	"Truly Madly Deeply"	Cascada	4	23 December 2006	1
23 December 2006	4	"You Know My Name"	Chris Cornell	7	23 December 2006	1
23 December 2006	1	"Tell Me"	P. Diddy featuring Christina Aguilera	8	23 December 2006	1
30 December 2006	5	"A Moment Like This" (#2)	Leona Lewis	1	30 December 2006	4
30 December 2006	1	"Sorry's Not Good Enough"/"Friday Night"	McFly	3	30 December 2006	1
30 December 2006	2	"I Think We're Alone Now"	Girls Aloud	4	30 December 2006	1

== Entries by artist ==
The following table shows artists who achieved two or more top 10 entries in 2006, including singles that reached their peak in 2005. The figures include both main artists and featured artists, while appearances on ensemble charity records are also counted for each artist. The total number of weeks an artist spent in the top ten in 2006 is also shown.

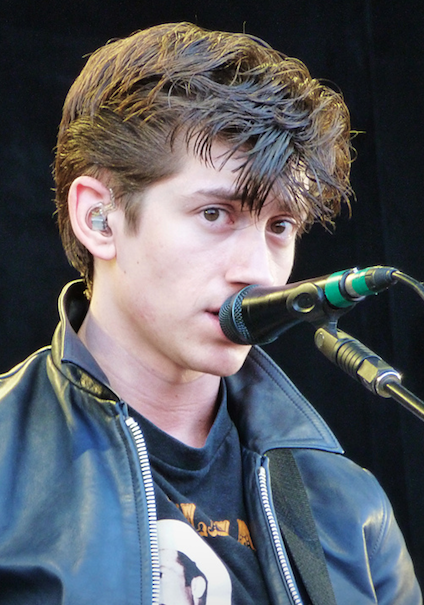
Arctic Monkeys (lead singer Alex Turner pictured) had two top 10 hits in 2006, including the number-one single "When the Sun Goes Down".

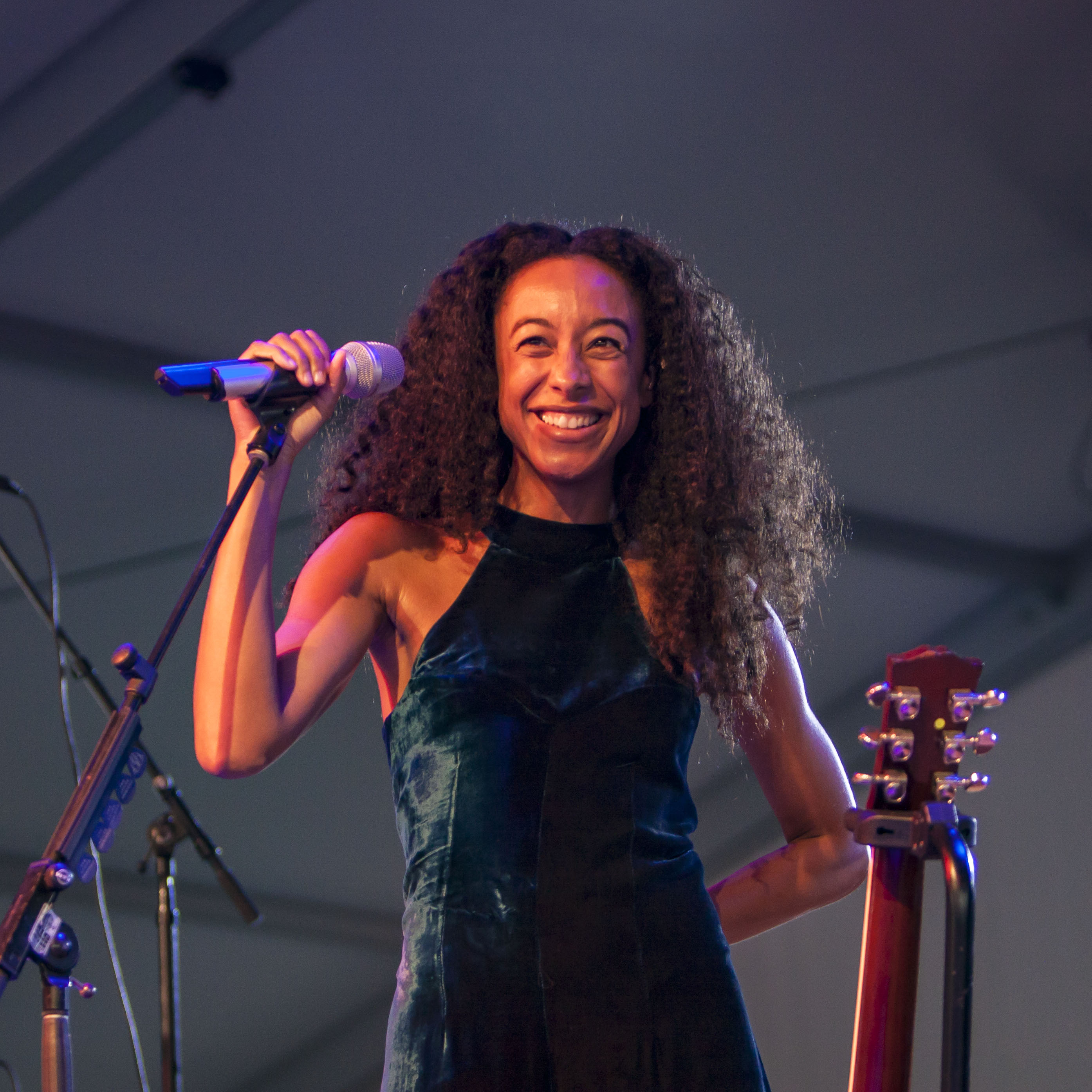
Corrine Bailey Rae scored her one and only top 10 single this year with the number two-peaking "Put Your Records On".

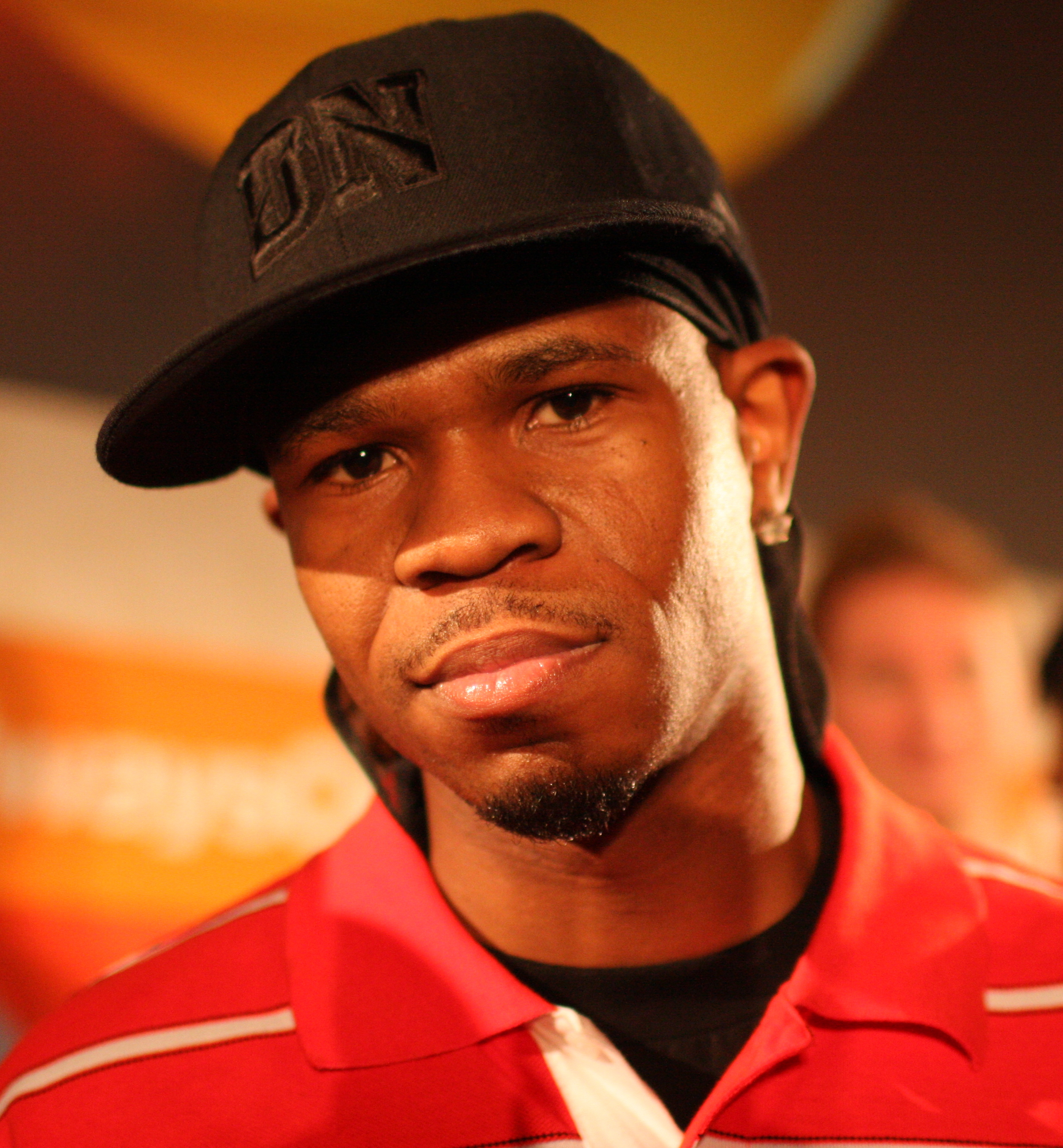
American rapper Chamillionaire reached number two in August 2006 with his best-known and most successful hit single "Ridin'", featuring guest vocals from fellow rapper Krayzie Bone.

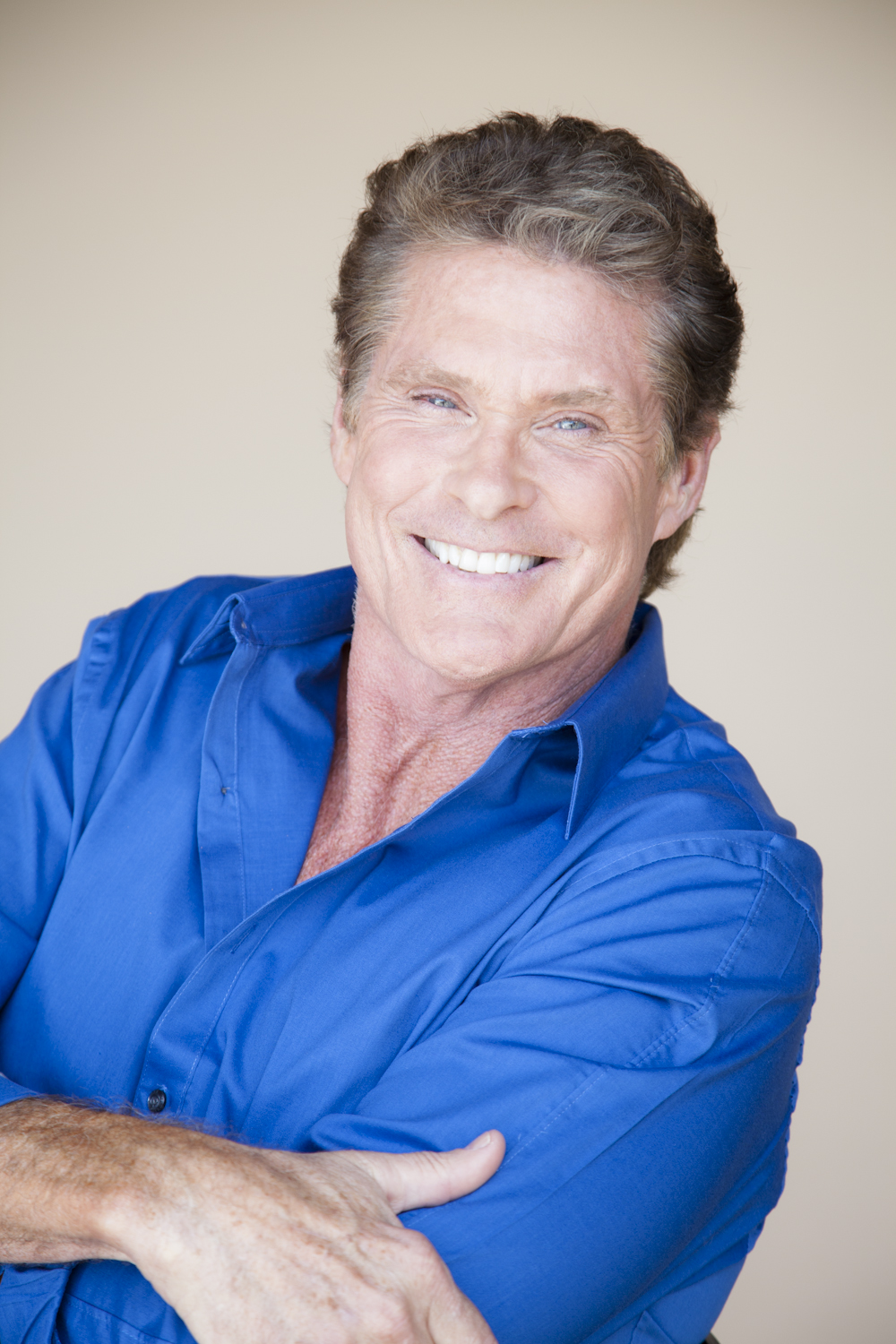
David Hasselhoff achieved his only UK top-ten single in October of this year with his cover version of "Jump in My Car", which peaked at number three.

Entries	Artist	Weeks	Singles
5	Nicole Scherzinger ^{[N]}^{[O]}^{[P]}	17	"Beep", "Buttons", "Come to Me", "I Don't Need a Man", "Stickwitu"
4	Fergie ^{[N]}^{[Q]}^{[R]}	12	"London Bridge", "My Humps", "Mas Que Nada", "Pump It"
4	Girls Aloud ^{[N]}	8	"I Think We're Alone Now", "See the Day", "Something Kinda Ooooh", "Whole Lotta History"
4	Madonna ^{[N]}	9	"Hung Up", "Get Together", "Jump", "Sorry"
4	The Pussycat Dolls ^{[N]}	13	"Beep", "Buttons", "I Don't Need a Man", "Stickwitu"
4	will.i.am ^{[N]}^{[Q]}^{[R]}^{[S]}	17	"Beep", "My Humps", "Mas Que Nada", "Pump It"
3	Beyoncé	15	"Check on It", "Déjà Vu", "Irreplaceable"
3	Black Eyed Peas ^{[N]}^{[R]}	10	"My Humps", "Mas Que Nada", "Pump It"
3	The Feeling	5	"Fill My Little World", "Never Be Lonely", "Sewn"
3	McFly	5	"Don't Stop Me Now"/"Please, Please", "Star Girl", "Sorry's Not Good Enough"/"Friday Night"
3	Nelly Furtado	15	"All Good Things (Come to an End)", "Maneater", "Promiscuous"
3	The Ordinary Boys	7	"Boys Will Be Boys", "Lonely at the Top", "Nine2Five"
3	P. Diddy ^{[T]}	13	"Come to Me", "Nasty Girl", "Tell Me"
3	Pink	8	"Stupid Girls", "U + Ur Hand", "Who Knew"
3	Sugababes ^{[N]}	5	"Easy", "Red Dress", "Ugly"
2	Arctic Monkeys	5	"Leave Before the Lights Come On", "When the Sun Goes Down"
2	Christina Aguilera	5	"Ain't No Other Man", "Tell Me"
2	Beatfreakz	4	"Somebody's Watching Me", "Superfreak"
2	Bob Sinclar	4	"Rock This Party (Everybody Dance Now)", "World, Hold On (Children of the Sky)"
2	Busta Rhymes	2	"I Love My Chick", "Touch It"
2	Cascada	7	"Everytime We Touch", "Truly Madly Deeply"
2	Embrace	5	"Nature's Law", "World at Your Feet"
2	Eminem ^{[U]}^{[V]}	9	"Smack That", "When I'm Gone"
2	Fall Out Boy	4	"Dance, Dance", "Sugar, We're Goin Down"
2	The Fratellis	2	"Chelsea Dagger", "Whistle for the Choir"
2	Gnarls Barkley	12	"Crazy", "Smiley Faces"
2	Jamelia	3	"Beware of the Dog", "Something About You"
2	James Morrison	7	"Wonderful World", "You Give Me Something"
2	Justin Timberlake	11	"My Love", "SexyBack"
2	The Kooks	7	"Naive", "She Moves in Her Own Way"
2	Lily Allen	8	"LDN", "Smile"
2	Muse	3	"Knights of Cydonia", "Supermassive Black Hole"
2	Ne-Yo	8	"Sexy Love", "So Sick"
2	Razorlight	7	"America", "In the Morning"
2	Rihanna	12	"SOS", "Unfaithful"
2	Robbie Williams	3	"Lovelight", "Rudebox"
2	Shakira	17	"Don't Bother", "Hips Don't Lie"
2	Shayne Ward ^{[N]}	13	"No Promises", "That's My Goal"
2	Snow Patrol	9	"Chasing Cars", "You're All I Have"
2	Sunblock	4	"First Time", "I'll Be Ready"
2	U2	7	"One", "The Saints Are Coming"
2	Westlife	4	"Amazing", "The Rose"
2	The Zutons	2	"Valerie", "Why Won't You Give Me Your Love?"

== Notes ==
- ^{a} "Fairytale of New York" was originally released in 1987, charting at number two for two weeks on 26 December 1987 (week ending).
- ^{b} "Fairytale of New York" re-entered the top 10 on 23 December 2006 at number 10 and climbed to number 6 the following week.
- ^{c} "You Spin Me Round (Like a Record)" originally peaked at number-one upon its initial release in 1985. The song re-entered the top 10 at number 5 on 11 February 2006 (week ending) for three weeks after it was re-released following Pete Burns' appearance on Celebrity Big Brother.
- ^{d} The original solo version of "You Got the Love" by Candi Staton peaked at number 95 in 1986. The remixed version by The Source peaked at number 4 for two weeks in 1991. A 1997 remix by New Voyager saw the song reach a new peak of number 3.
- ^{e} "Teenage Life" was the United Kingdom's entry at the Eurovision Song Contest in 2006.
- ^{f} "Three Lions" was released for the first time ahead of Euro 96, reaching number-one on 1 June 1996 (week ending) and for another week on 6 July 1996 (week ending).
- ^{g} Released as the official single for Sport Relief.
- ^{h} "Chasing Cars" re-entered the top 10 at number 9 on 13 January 2007 (week ending).
- ^{i} "Something Kinda Oooh" re-entered the top 10 at number 9 on 2 December 2006 (week ending).
- ^{j} Released as a charity single to aid relief efforts following Hurricane Katrina.
- ^{k} "Patience" re-entered the top 10 at number ten on 24 February 2007 (week ending).
- ^{l} Released as the official single for Children in Need.
- ^{m} "Wind It Up" re-entered the top 10 at number 10 on 6 January 2007 (week ending) for one week.
- ^{n} Figure includes song that peaked in 2005.
- ^{o} Figure includes four top 10 singles with the group The Pussycat Dolls.
- ^{p} Figure includes appearance on Diddy's "Come to Me".
- ^{q} Figure includes three top 10 singles with the group The Black Eyed Peas.
- ^{r} Figure includes appearance on Sergio Mendes' "Mas Que Nada".
- ^{s} Figure includes appearance on The Pussycat Dolls' "Beep".
- ^{t} Figure includes appearance on The Notorious B.I.G.'s "Nasty Girl".
- ^{u} Figure includes appearance on Akon's "Smack That".
- ^{v} Figure includes song that first charted in 2005 but peaked in 2006.
- ^{w} Figure includes appearance on The Pogues' "Fairytale of New York".

== See also ==
- 2006 in British music
- List of number-one singles from the 2000s (UK)
