= List of UK top-ten albums in 2006 =

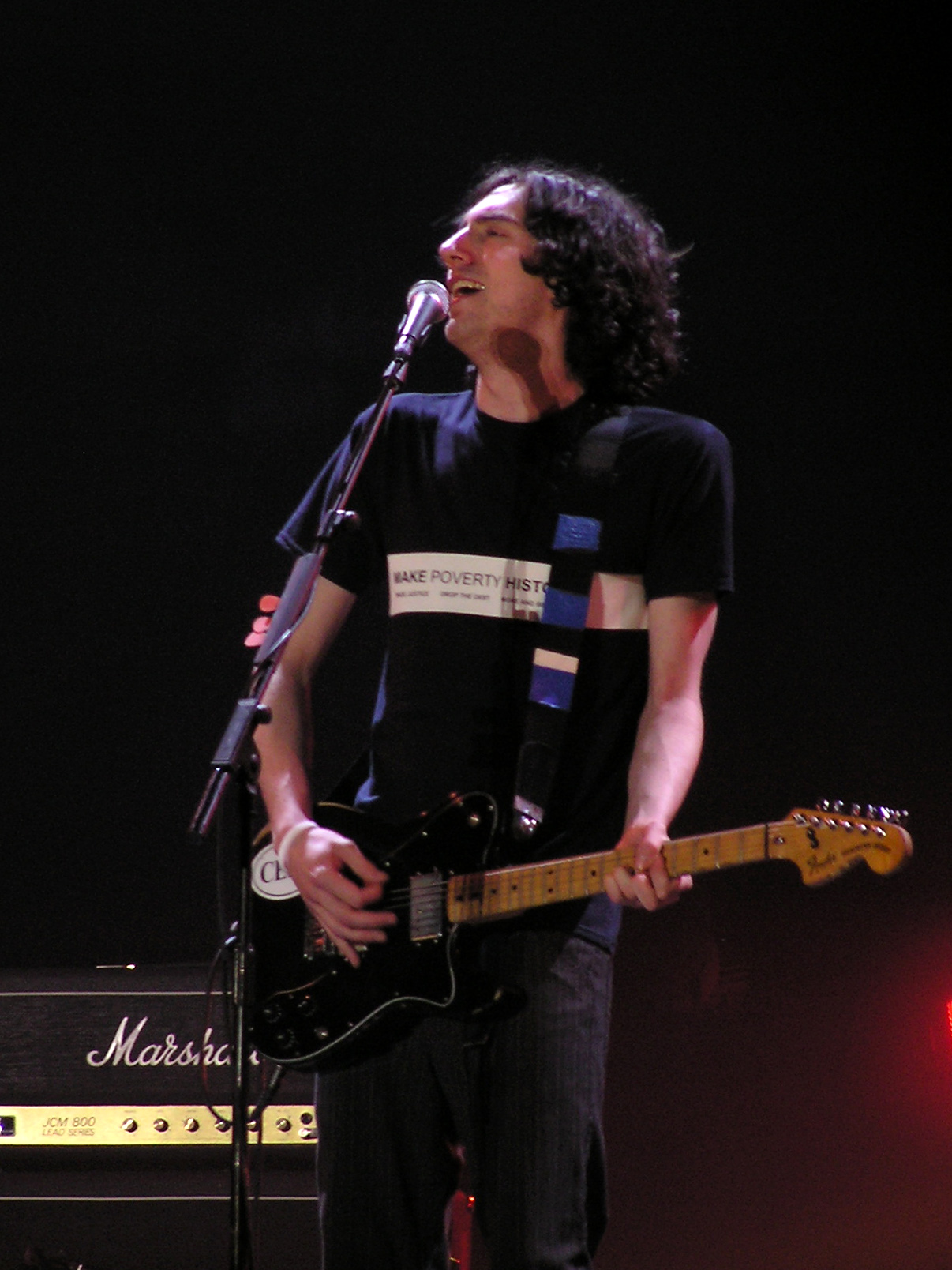
Gary Lightbody and his band Snow Patrol had the best selling album of 2006 with Eyes Open. The album spent a total of 35 weeks inside the UK top 10, and had three non-consecutive weeks at number-one.

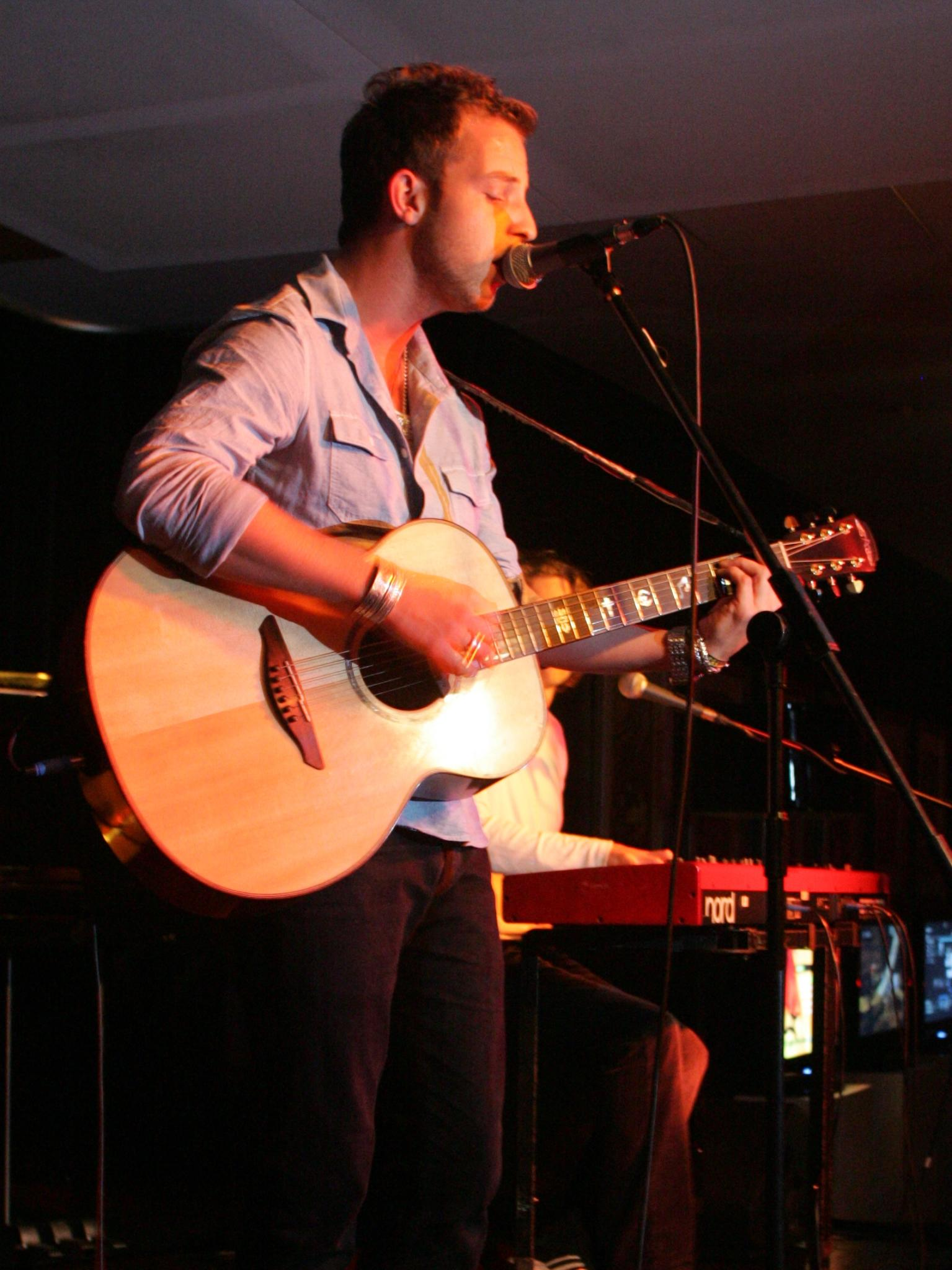
James Morrison reached number-one in August of this year with his debut album Undiscovered, which spent a total of 17 weeks in the top 10.

The UK Albums Chart is one of many music charts compiled by the Official Charts Company that calculates the best-selling albums of the week in the United Kingdom. Since 2004 the chart has been based on the sales of both physical albums and digital downloads. This list shows albums that peaked in the Top 10 of the UK Albums Chart during 2006, as well as albums which peaked in 2005 and 2007 but were in the top 10 in 2006. The entry date is when the album appeared in the top 10 for the first time (week ending, as published by the Official Charts Company, which is six days after the chart is announced).

One-hundred and thirty-two albums were in the top ten this year. Fourteen albums from 2005 remained in the top 10 for several weeks at the beginning of the year, while Back to Black by Amy Winehouse and Loose by Nelly Furtado were both released in 2006 but did not reach their peak until 2007. Breakaway by Kelly Clarkson, Employment by Kaiser Chiefs, In Between Dreams by Jack Johnson, PCD by The Pussycat Dolls and Stars of CCTV by Hard-Fi were the albums from 2005 to reach their peak in 2006. Two artists scored multiple entries in the top 10 in 2006. Arctic Monkeys, Editors, The Kooks, Rihanna and Shayne Ward were among the many artists who achieved their first UK charting top 10 album in 2006.

The 2005 Christmas number-one album, Curtain Call: The Hits by Eminem, remained at the top spot for the first week of 2006. The first new number-one album of the year was First Impressions of Earth by The Strokes. Overall, thirty-three different albums peaked at number-one in 2006, with thirty-three unique artists hitting that position.

== Background ==
=== Multiple entries ===
One-hundred and thirty-two albums charted in the top 10 in 2006, with one-hundred and twenty-one albums reaching their peak this year (including Snap!, which charted in previous years but reached a peak on its latest chart run).

Two artist scored multiple entries in the top 10 in 2006. Robbie Williams had three top 10 albums this year, while Daniel O'Donnell had two entries. Daniel O'Donnell's two entries were both released this year.

=== Chart debuts ===
Thirty-six artists achieved their first top 10 album in 2006 as a lead artist.

The following table (collapsed on desktop site) does not include acts who had previously charted as part of a group and secured their first top 10 solo album, or featured appearances on compilations or other artists recordings.

Artist	Number of top 10s	First entry	Chart position	Other entries
Editors	1	The Back Room	2	—
José González	1	Veneer	7	—
Arctic Monkeys	1	Whatever People Say I Am, That's What I'm Not	1	—
The Kooks	1	Inside In / Inside Out	2	—
Corinne Bailey Rae	1	Corinne Bailey Rae	1	—
Vittorio Grigolo	1	In the Hands of Love	6	—
Journey South	1	Journey South	1	—
Andy Abraham	1	The Impossible Dream	2	—
Yeah Yeah Yeahs	1	Show Your Bones	7	—
The Flaming Lips	1	At War with the Mystics	6	—
Shayne Ward	1	Shayne Ward	1	—
Peter Grant	1	New Vintage	8	—
Gnarls Barkley	1	St. Elsewhere	1	—
Rihanna	1	A Girl like Me	5	—
Emmylou Harris	1	All the Roadrunning	8	—
Jamie Foxx	1	Unpredictable	9	—
Tool	1	10,000 Days	4	—
Dirty Pretty Things	1	Waterloo to Anywhere	3	—
The Raconteurs	1	Broken Boy Soldiers	2	—
Angels & Airwaves	1	We Don't Need to Whisper	6	—
Orson	1	Bright Idea	1	—
Sandi Thom	1	Smile... It Confuses People	1	—
The Feeling	1	Twelve Stops and Home	2	—
The Automatic	1	Not Accepted Anywhere	3	—
Dixie Chicks	1	Taking the Long Way	10	—
Ray LaMontagne	1	Trouble	5	—
Lily Allen	1	Alright, Still	2	—
Paolo Nutini	1	These Streets	3	—
James Morrison	1	Undiscovered	1	—
The Fratellis	1	Costello Music	2	—
Trivium	1	The Crusade	7	—
John Legend	1	Once Again	10	—
Angelis	1	Angelis	2	—
All Angels	1	All Angels	9	—
Tenacious D	1	The Pick of Destiny	10	—
Fron Male Voice Choir	1	Voices of the Valley	9	—

Notes

Simon Webbe released his debut album in 2006 during his group Blue's hiatus - he had recorded 3 number-one albums and a number 6 peaking compilation album with his bandmates by that point. David Gilmour was part of the highly successful Pink Floyd but he secured his first solo top 10 album this year with On an Island going straight to the top of the chart. His previous two efforts - 1978's self-titled album (17) and 1984's About Face (21) - both fell short of the top ten.

Like fellow Libertines member Pete Doherty with Babyshambles the previous year, Carl Barat hit the chart with his new band Dirty Pretty Things with their debut album Waterloo to Anywhere, peaking at number three. Similarly another new rock band The Raconteurs included The White Stripes frontman Jack White among its line-up.

Thom Yorke stepped into the spotlight away from Radiohead with his debut album, The Eraser reaching third position in the chart. Pharrell Williams also reached the top 10 with his first solo effort, In My Mind. With his group N.E.R.D., Fly or Die had previously made the chart.

=== Best-selling albums ===
Snow Patrol had the best-selling album of the year with Eyes Open. The album spent 35 weeks in the top 10 (including three weeks at number one), sold 1.504 million copies and was certified 5× platinum by the BPI. Beautiful World by Take That came in second place. Scissor Sisters' Ta-Dah, Whatever People Say I Am, That's What I'm Not from Arctic Monkeys and Inside In / Inside Out by The Kooks made up the top five. Albums by Razorlight, Oasis, Westlife, Pink and James Morrison were also in the top ten best-selling albums of the year.

== Top-ten albums ==
Key

Symbol	Meaning
‡	Album peaked in 2005 but still in chart in 2006.
♦	Album released in 2006 but peaked in 2007.
(#)	Year-end top-ten album position and rank
Entered	The date that the album first appeared in the chart.
Peak	Highest position that the album reached in the UK Albums Chart.

Entered (week ending)	Weeks in top 10	Album	Artist	Peak	Peak reached (week ending)	Weeks at peak
Albums in 2005
19 March 2005	35	Employment	Kaiser Chiefs	2	25 February 2006	1
21 May 2005	19	Eye to the Telescope ‡	KT Tunstall	3	24 September 2005	2
4 June 2005	22	Demon Days ‡	Gorillaz	1	4 June 2005	1
4 June 2005	40	Back to Bedlam ‡	James Blunt	1	16 July 2005	10
18 June 2005	18	X & Y ‡	Coldplay	1	18 June 2005	4
16 July 2005	7	Stars of CCTV	Hard-Fi	1	28 January 2006	1
30 July 2005	23	Breakaway	Kelly Clarkson	3	7 January 2006	1
17 September 2005	17	In Between Dreams	Jack Johnson	1	4 March 2006	1
24 September 2005	5	PCD	The Pussycat Dolls	7	8 July 2006	1
8 October 2005	10	Piece by Piece ‡	Katie Melua	1	8 October 2005	1
5 November 2005	10	Intensive Care ‡	Robbie Williams	1	5 November 2005	1
26 November 2005	7	Confessions on a Dance Floor ‡	Madonna	1	26 November 2005	2
3 December 2005	10	Keep On ‡	Will Young	2	3 December 2005	1
10 December 2005	8	Curtain Call: The Hits ‡	Eminem	1	10 December 2005	5
Albums in 2006
7 January 2006	2	Greatest Hits	Robbie Williams	5	7 January 2006	1
14 January 2006	3	First Impressions of Earth	The Strokes	1	14 January 2006	1
21 January 2006	3	The Back Room	Editors	2	28 January 2006	1
28 January 2006	4	Veneer	José González	7	28 January 2006	2
4 February 2006	8	Whatever People Say I Am, That's What I'm Not (#4)	Arctic Monkeys	1	4 February 2006	4
4 February 2006	3	Keys to the World	Richard Ashcroft	2	4 February 2006	2
4 February 2006	3	From Daniel with Love: A Collection of 20 Great Love Songs	Daniel O'Donnell	5	4 February 2006	1
4 February 2006	25	Inside In / Inside Out (#5)	The Kooks	2	15 July 2006	2
18 February 2006	1	The Very Best of Johnny Mathis	Johnny Mathis	6	18 February 2006	1
18 February 2006	1	The Life Pursuit	Belle and Sebastian	8	18 February 2006	1
25 February 2006	3	Snap!	The Jam	8	4 March 2006	2
4 March 2006	3	12 Songs	Neil Diamond	5	4 March 2006	1
11 March 2006	10	Corinne Bailey Rae	Corinne Bailey Rae	1	11 March 2006	2
11 March 2006	2	Sanctuary	Simon Webbe	7	18 March 2006	1
18 March 2006	2	On an Island	David Gilmour	1	18 March 2006	1
18 March 2006	4	Amore	Andrea Bocelli	4	18 March 2006	1
18 March 2006	1	Pay the Devil	Van Morrison	8	18 March 2006	1
25 March 2006	3	The Voice: The Ultimate Collection	Russell Watson	2	25 March 2006	1
25 March 2006	2	In the Hands of Love	Vittorio Grigolo	6	25 March 2006	1
25 March 2006	1	Meds	Placebo	7	25 March 2006	1
25 March 2006	2	Greatest Hits	David Essex	7	1 April 2006	1
1 April 2006	3	Journey South	Journey South	1	1 April 2006	1
1 April 2006	3	The Impossible Dream	Andy Abraham	2	1 April 2006	1
1 April 2006	1	3121	Prince	9	1 April 2006	1
1 April 2006	3	Voice – The Best of Beverley Knight	Beverley Knight	9	22 April 2006	2
8 April 2006	3	This New Day	Embrace	1	8 April 2006	1
8 April 2006	7	Collected	Massive Attack	2	8 April 2006	3
8 April 2006	1	Show Your Bones	Yeah Yeah Yeahs	7	8 April 2006	1
15 April 2006	2	Ringleader of the Tormentors	Morrissey	1	15 April 2006	1
15 April 2006	7	I'm Not Dead (#9)	Pink	3	15 April 2006	1
15 April 2006	1	At War with the Mystics	The Flaming Lips	6	15 April 2006	1
22 April 2006	2	The Hardest Way to Make an Easy Living	The Streets	1	22 April 2006	1
29 April 2006	5	Shayne Ward	Shayne Ward	1	29 April 2006	1
29 April 2006	7	Tired of Hanging Around	The Zutons	2	29 April 2006	1
29 April 2006	1	New Vintage	Peter Grant	8	29 April 2006	1
29 April 2006	1	Simpatico	The Charlatans	10	29 April 2006	1
6 May 2006	7	St. Elsewhere	Gnarls Barkley	1	6 May 2006	1
6 May 2006	1	We Shall Overcome: The Seeger Sessions	Bruce Springsteen	3	6 May 2006	1
6 May 2006	9	A Girl Like Me	Rihanna	5	22 July 2006	1
6 May 2006	1	All the Roadrunning	Mark Knopfler & Emmylou Harris	8	6 May 2006	1
6 May 2006	1	Unpredictable	Jamie Foxx	9	6 May 2006	1
13 May 2006	35	Eyes Open (#1)	Snow Patrol	1	13 May 2006	3
13 May 2006	1	10,000 Days	Tool	4	13 May 2006	1
13 May 2006	1	Pearl Jam	Pearl Jam	5	13 May 2006	1
20 May 2006	6	Stadium Arcadium	Red Hot Chili Peppers	1	20 May 2006	3
20 May 2006	2	Waterloo to Anywhere	Dirty Pretty Things	3	20 May 2006	1
27 May 2006	2	Broken Boy Soldiers	The Raconteurs	2	27 May 2006	1
27 May 2006	4	The Singles	Feeder	2	3 June 2006	1
27 May 2006	1	Superbi	The Beautiful South	6	27 May 2006	1
3 June 2006	2	The Garden	Zero 7	4	3 June 2006	1
3 June 2006	1	Fundamental	Pet Shop Boys	5	3 June 2006	1
3 June 2006	1	We Don't Need to Whisper	Angels & Airwaves	6	3 June 2006	1
10 June 2006	5	Bright Idea	Orson	1	10 June 2006	1
10 June 2006	13	The Very Best of Nina Simone	Nina Simone	6	8 July 2006	1
17 June 2006	4	Smile... It Confuses People	Sandi Thom	1	17 June 2006	1
17 June 2006	9	Twelve Stops and Home	The Feeling	2	17 June 2006	1
17 June 2006	1	Bring You Home	Ronan Keating	3	17 June 2006	1
17 June 2006	2	Surprise	Paul Simon	4	17 June 2006	2
17 June 2006	1	Riot City Blues	Primal Scream	5	17 June 2006	1
24 June 2006	9	Under the Iron Sea	Keane	1	24 June 2006	2
24 June 2006	18	Loose ♦	Nelly Furtado	4	21 April 2007	1
24 June 2006	1	The Complete Greatest Hits	Eagles	9	27 June 2006	1
1 July 2006	4	The Greatest Hits – Why Try Harder	Fatboy Slim	2	1 July 2006	1
1 July 2006	2	Not Accepted Anywhere	The Automatic	3	1 July 2006	1
1 July 2006	1	Taking the Long Way	Dixie Chicks	10	1 July 2006	1
8 July 2006	2	Liberation Transmission	Lostprophets	1	8 July 2006	1
15 July 2006	6	Black Holes and Revelations	Muse	1	15 July 2006	2
15 July 2006	1	American V: A Hundred Highways	Johnny Cash	9	15 July 2006	1
22 July 2006	1	The Eraser	Thom Yorke	3	22 July 2006	1
22 July 2006	5	Trouble	Ray LaMontagne	5	12 August 2006	1
29 July 2006	23	Razorlight (#6)	Razorlight	1	29 July 2006	2
29 July 2006	12	Alright, Still	Lily Allen	2	29 July 2006	1
29 July 2006	15	These Streets	Paolo Nutini	3	29 July 2006	1
5 August 2006	1	In My Mind	Pharrell Williams	7	5 August 2006	1
12 August 2006	17	Undiscovered (#10)	James Morrison	1	12 August 2006	2
26 August 2006	3	Back to Basics	Christina Aguilera	1	26 August 2006	1
9 September 2006	4	Empire	Kasabian	1	9 September 2006	1
9 September 2006	5	Modern Times	Bob Dylan	3	9 September 2006	1
9 September 2006	1	A Matter of Life and Death	Iron Maiden	4	9 September 2006	1
16 September 2006	2	B'Day	Beyoncé	3	16 September 2006	1
16 September 2006	1	Lover of Life, Singer of Songs: The Very Best of Freddie Mercury Solo	Freddie Mercury	6	16 September 2006	1
16 September 2006	1	Respect M.E.	Missy Elliott	7	16 September 2006	1
23 September 2006	9	FutureSex/LoveSounds	Justin Timberlake	1	23 September 2006	1
23 September 2006	11	Costello Music	The Fratellis	2	23 September 2006	3
23 September 2006	3	The Truth About Love	Lemar	3	23 September 2006	1
30 September 2006	8	Ta-Dah (#3)	Scissor Sisters	1	30 September 2006	2
30 September 2006	1	The Captain & the Kid	Elton John	6	30 September 2006	1
14 October 2006	8	Sam's Town	The Killers	1	14 October 2006	3
14 October 2006	3	The Open Door	Evanescence	2	14 October 2006	1
14 October 2006	1	Until the Next Time	Daniel O'Donnell	10	14 October 2006	1
21 October 2006	1	The Crusade	Trivium	7	21 October 2006	1
28 October 2006	1	The Ultimate	Luther Vandross	10	28 October 2006	1
4 November 2006	3	Rudebox	Robbie Williams	1	4 November 2006	1
4 November 2006	2	The Black Parade	My Chemical Romance	2	4 November 2006	1
4 November 2006	2	Bat Out of Hell III: The Monster Is Loose	Meat Loaf	3	4 November 2006	1
4 November 2006	2	Still the Same... Great Rock Classics of Our Time	Rod Stewart	4	4 November 2006	1
4 November 2006	1	Once Again	John Legend	10	4 November 2006	1
11 November 2006	7	The Sound of Girls Aloud: The Greatest Hits	Girls Aloud	1	11 November 2006	1
11 November 2006	54	Back to Black ♦	Amy Winehouse	1	20 January 2007	3
11 November 2006	1	Endless Wire	The Who	9	11 November 2006	1
18 November 2006	6	High Times: Singles 1992–2006	Jamiroquai	1	18 November 2006	1
18 November 2006	3	Angelis	Angelis	2	18 November 2006	1
18 November 2006	1	9	Damien Rice	4	18 November 2006	1
18 November 2006	2	Serenade	Katherine Jenkins	5	18 November 2006	1
18 November 2006	1	Motion in the Ocean	McFly	6	18 November 2006	1
18 November 2006	2	Hit Parade	Paul Weller	7	18 November 2006	1
18 November 2006	1	Two's Company: The Duets	Cliff Richard	8	18 November 2006	1
25 November 2006	7	Twenty Five	George Michael	1	25 November 2006	1
25 November 2006	2	Overloaded: The Singles Collection	Sugababes	3	25 November 2006	1
25 November 2006	1	All Angels	All Angels	9	25 November 2006	1
25 November 2006	1	The Pick of Destiny	Tenacious D	10	25 November 2006	1
2 December 2006	6	The Love Album (#8)	Westlife	1	2 December 2006	1
2 December 2006	8	Stop the Clocks (#7)	Oasis	2	2 December 2006	4
2 December 2006	9	Love	The Beatles	3	2 December 2006	1
2 December 2006	6	U218 Singles	U2	4	2 December 2006	1
9 December 2006	28	Beautiful World (#2)	Take That	1	9 December 2006	8
9 December 2006	4	Siempre	Il Divo	2	9 December 2006	1
9 December 2006	2	Voices of the Valley	Fron Male Voice Choir	9	9 December 2006	2

== Entries by artist ==
The following table shows artists who achieved two or more top 10 entries in 2006, including albums that reached their peak in 2005. The figures only include main artists, with featured artists and appearances on compilation albums not counted individually for each artist. The total number of weeks an artist spent in the top ten in 2006 is also shown.

Entries	Artist	Weeks	Albums
3	Robbie Williams	6	Greatest Hits, Intensive Care, Rudebox
2	Daniel O'Donnell	4	From Daniel with Love: A Collection of 20 Great Love Songs, Until the Next Time

== Notes ==
- Employment re-entered the top 10 at number 7 on 7 January 2006 (week ending) for 10 weeks.
- Eye to the Telescope re-entered the top 10 at number 6 on 14 January 2006 (week ending) for 2 weeks and at number 4 on 25 February 2006 (week ending) for 5 weeks.
- Demon Days re-entered the top 10 at number 7 on 25 February 2006 (week ending) for 3 weeks.
- Monkey Business re-entered the top 10 at number 10 on 22 April 2006 (week ending).
- X & Y re-entered the top 10 at number 8 on 25 February 2006 (week ending).
- Stars of CCTV re-entered the top 10 at number 4 on 7 January 2006 (week ending) for 6 weeks.
- Breakaway re-entered the top 10 at number 10 on 28 January 2006 (week ending) and at number 10 on 11 February 2006 (week ending) for 4 weeks.
- In Between Dreams re-entered the top 10 at number 9 on 28 January 2006 (week ending), at number 6 on 25 February 2006 (week ending) for 10 weeks and at number 10 on 13 May 2006 (week ending) for 4 weeks.
- PCD re-entered the top 10 at number 10 on 7 January 2006 (week ending) and at number 7 on 8 July 2006 (week ending) for 2 weeks.
- Piece by Piece re-entered the top 10 at number 9 on 14 January 2006 (week ending) for 2 weeks.
- Keep On re-entered the top 10 at number 10 on 21 January 2006 (week ending) for 6 weeks and at number 10 on 6 May 2006 (week ending) for 3 weeks.
- Greatest Hits by Robbie Williams originally peaked at number-one on its initial release in 2004.
- Inside In / Inside Out re-entered the top 10 at number 9 on 8 April 2006. (week ending) for 10 weeks, at number 7 on 24 June 2006 (week ending) for 12 weeks and at number 8 on 7 October 2006 (week ending) for 2 weeks.
- Snap! originally peaked at number 2 upon its initial release in 1983.
- Corinne Bailey Rae re-entered the top 10 at number 8 on 20 May 2006 (week ending) and at number 10 on 21 October 2006 (week ending).
- Voice: The Best of Beverley Knight re-entered the top 10 at number 9 on 22 April 2006 (week ending) for 2 weeks.
- I'm Not Dead re-entered the top 10 at number 5 on 10 June 2006 (week ending), at number 10 on 16 September 2006 (week ending) for 2 weeks and at number 6 on 6 January 2007 (week ending) for 2 weeks.
- Tired of Hanging Around re-entered the top 10 at number 5 on 8 July 2006 (week ending) for 4 weeks.
- St. Elsewhere re-entered the top 10 at number 10 on 12 August 2006 (week ending).
- A Girl like Me re-entered the top 10 at number 10 on 8 July 2006 (week ending) for 7 weeks.
- Eyes Open re-entered the top 10 at number 6 on 22 July 2006 (week ending) for 16 weeks and at number 7 on 23 December 2006 (week ending) for 12 weeks.
- Bright Idea re-entered the top 10 at number 4 on 19 August 2006 (week ending) for 3 weeks.
- Twelve Stops and Home re-entered the top 10 at number 10 on 26 August 2006 (week ending) for 6 weeks.
- Under the Iron Sea re-entered the top 10 at number 9 on 26 August 2006 (week ending) for 2 weeks and at number 8 on 3 February 2007 (week ending) for 2 weeks.
- Loose re-entered the top 10 at number 9 on 9 September 2006 (week ending) for 3 weeks, at number 9 on 3 March 2007 (week ending) for 3 weeks, at number 6 on 31 March 2007 (week ending) for 7 weeks and at number 7 on 14 July 2007 (week ending) for 3 weeks.
- Black Holes and Revelations re-entered the top 10 at number 8 on 9 September 2006 (week ending) for 2 weeks.
- Razorlight re-entered the top 10 at number 8 on 23 September 2006 (week ending) for 8 weeks, at number 7 on 25 November 2006 (week ending) for 2 weeks, at number 9 on 30 December 2006 (week ending) for 6 weeks and at number 9 on 24 February 2007 (week ending).
- Alright, Still re-entered the top 10 at number 4 on 7 October 2006 (week ending) for 4 weeks, at number 6 on 27 January 2007 (week ending) for 2 weeks and at number 7 on 3 March 2007 (week ending) for 2 weeks.
- These Streets re-entered the top 10 at number 10 on 7 October 2006 (week ending) for 2 weeks, at number 8 on 28 October 2006 (week ending), at number 9 on 13 January 2007 (week ending) for 4 weeks and at number 10 on 1 September 2007 (week ending) for 2 weeks.
- Undiscovered re-entered the top 10 at number 8 on 21 October 2006 (week ending) for 3 weeks and at number 8 on 6 January 2007 (week ending) for 9 weeks.
- FutureSex/LoveSounds re-entered the top 10 at number 10 on 11 November 2006 (week ending), at number 9 on 31 March 2007 (week ending) for 2 weeks and at number 7 on 21 April 2007 (week ending) for 3 weeks.
- Costello Music re-entered the top 10 at number 6 on 13 January 2007 (week ending) for 4 weeks and at number 10 on 3 March 2007 (week ending).
- Ta-Dah re-entered the top 10 at number 10 on 30 December 2006 (week ending).
- Sam's Town re-entered the top 10 at number 6 on 3 March 2007 (week ending) for 3 weeks and at number 9 on 7 July 2007 (week ending).
- Back to Black re-entered the top 10 at number 2 on 13 January 2007 (week ending) for 28 weeks, at number 8 on 28 July 2007 (week ending) for 18 weeks and at number 9 on 8 December 2007 (week ending) for 7 weeks.
- Beautiful World re-entered the top 10 at number 5 on 24 February 2007 (week ending) for 10 weeks, at number 9 on 24 November 2007 (week ending) for 2 weeks and at number 10 on 15 December 2007 (week ending) for 8 weeks.
- B'Day re-entered the top 10 at number 8 on 5 May 2007 (week ending).
- Figure includes album that peaked in 2005.

== See also ==
- 2006 in British music
- List of number-one albums from the 2000s (UK)
