= 2006 in British music charts =

This is a summary of 2006 in music in the United Kingdom including the official single and album charts.

== Summary ==
- At both ends of the year, the chart was dominated by acts from series 2 and series 3 of The X Factor: former contestants Shayne Ward, Chico Slimani and Leona Lewis had number one singles, with Ward and Journey South both enjoying number-one albums.
- A number of pop acts from the 1990s enjoyed comebacks, with Take That in particular having chart and touring success; Emma Bunton and All Saints also returned to the charts.
- The internet had an increased impact on music. Sandi Thom and Lily Allen both had massive success off the back of initial exposure on the web, Many artists used MySpace to spread their music to the wider world Downloaded music also began to dominate the charts, with sales of legal downloads rising from less than six million in 2004 to over 50 million in 2006. When the rules changed, "Crazy" by Gnarls Barkley became the first song to top the singles chart on the basis of downloads alone. From the beginning of 2007, 'physical' copies of a song no longer need to be issued for a song to chart which raises the possibility of golden oldies entering the charts on the back of downloads alone.
- The rise of the internet's influence contrasted with the end of some other long running pop media. Smash Hits magazine, the traditional live Saturday morning kids' programmes on BBC & ITV and Top of the Pops television show all ended in 2006; Top of the Pops had been broadcasting on the BBC since 1964 whilst the Saturday morning kids shows had been broadcasting on the BBC & ITV since 1968 with Smash! Hits being published since 1978.

=== Chronological Review ===
In January, X Factor winner Shayne Ward held on to the top spot in the single chart with his debut "That's My Goal" for three weeks. Ward later went on to top the charts with his debut album in April, on the back of his reality TV show success.

Meanwhile, The Strokes and HARD-Fi both got their first number one albums in January, the Strokes previously having two number twos. Arctic Monkeys were the big story, with their second single "When the Sun Goes Down" repeating the feat of their debut and reaching number one. A week later their debut album, "Whatever People Say I Am, That's What I'm Not", sold over 360,000 copies in its first week. It stayed at number one for four weeks. Arctic Monkeys were also big winners at the NME Awards, taking home three awards. They picked up Best Single for "I Bet You Look Good on the Dancefloor", Best New Band and Best Group. Other winners included Kanye West, singer Ricky Wilson and the Kaiser Chiefs who despite being nominated for six awards only came away with one for Best Album.

The 2006 BRIT Awards were dominated by 'new' acts, with the Kaiser Chiefs winning 3 awards, including 'Best Group', and James Blunt coming away with two. Other big winners were Coldplay, who had the best album and single, and Green Day.

The pop band All Saints announced that they would be reforming, five years after they had split in 2001. Another return came from Leo Sayer, who hit number one 29 years after his previous chart topper, with a remix of the single "Thunder in My Heart". Smash Hits magazine, however, left the music business after 28 years of covering pop music. Later in the year, Top of the Pops also ended, after 42 years on British television. It had been losing ratings for the past five years, having been usurped by music television. The traditional live Saturday morning children's programmes ended too, after 38 years on BBC & ITV. Again, they had been losing ratings for the past 4 years, for the same reason.

The other number ones in the start of the year went to Madonna, with her 12th chart-topper "Sorry", and to US rapper The Notorious B.I.G. in February, who climbed to number one. The song was a re-working of his debut single "Nasty Girl" (which features guest appearances from Jagged Edge, P. Diddy, Nelly, and Avery Storm). He died in 1997, but this is the first time he has scored a #1 and just under a year after "rival" rapper 2Pac had also achieved his first #1 with "Ghetto Gospel".

Chico Slimani, who had finished fifth in the X Factor, went straight to number one with "It's Chico Time", holding on to the top spot for two weeks in March. Orson climbed to the top of the singles chart successfully knocked Chico off the top spot with their song "No Tomorrow".

With a new chart rule stating that singles on downloads alone may enter the chart a week before their full release, Ne-Yo was the first act who managed to climb from #18 to #1, one week after it was released on downloads alone, with his debut single So Sick. Embrace entered to #2 that week with their new single "Nature's Law", making it their biggest single to date. However, it only failed to reach #1 due to a large count of legal downloads which didn't register in the official charts. The following week, their fifth studio album This New Day became their third album to reach #1 in the UK Albums Chart. Other acts that benefited from the change in rules included The Black Eyed Peas, Pink, Liz McClarnon, Girls Aloud, Yeah Yeah Yeahs, James Blunt, Joey Negro, Sean Paul and Nelly. The following week, Gnarls Barkley became the first act to top the singles chart on downloads alone, with Crazy. This was the start of huge success for the duo, who went on to top the singles charts for 9 weeks, as well as the album chart for a week and also the UK Official Download Chart for an outstanding 11 weeks making it the longest stay on the UK Official Download Chart history. However, the single version of Crazy was deliberately deleted on 28 May in order to stop the single's welcome being overstayed. "Crazy" was the first single to top the UK singles chart for nine weeks consecutively since 1994 when Wet Wet Wet's "Love Is All Around" was number one for fifteen weeks (the last song to spend exactly nine weeks on top was "Two Tribes" by Frankie Goes to Hollywood in 1984). But, Crazy's nine-week run at number one came to an end when singer/songwriter Sandi Thom finally knocked it off number one with her debut single I Wish I Was a Punk Rocker (With Flowers in My Hair). 2006 also saw Morrissey return to the top of the album chart for the first time in 12 years with "Ringleader of the Tormentors".

Thom occupied the number one spot for a solitary week before being replaced by Nelly Furtado, who climbed to number one with Maneater and maintained her position the following 3 weeks. On 18 June 2006 there were five England Football World Cup songs in the top 13 in the Official UK Singles Chart. This included the official single by Embrace, a parody of the Dad's Army theme by the Tonedef Allstars and the former number 1 single Three Lions, which topped the chart in both 1996 and 1998.

The festival season was marked by the absence of Glastonbury, which was taking a 'fallow year'. Headliners at the major festivals included: The Who and Red Hot Chili Peppers at T in the Park; Coldplay and the Foo Fighters at the Isle of Wight Festival; Metallica and Guns N' Roses at Download Festival; Radiohead and Kasabian at V Festival; The Prodigy and Goldfrapp at Creamfields; Daft Punk and Groove Armada at Global Gathering 2006; The Who and The Strokes at the Wireless Festival; and Pearl Jam and Muse at the Carling Weekend. This would turn out to be the penultimate year, that the much disputed sponsorship deal by the brewery would take place, and would go on to be the start of the brewery's decline in the UK live music scene, as it suddenly lost its sponsorship deals for gig venues to LiveNation and O2

Following Nelly Furtado's 3 weeks on top for the first time, both Shakira featuring Wyclef Jean's Hips Don't Lie and Lily Allen's Smile enjoyed a first time at the top of the UK singles chart summit with Shakira's smash hit and Lily Allen's debut single. Another debut single to be released was German dance group Cascada's Everytime We Touch which went on to peak at #2, as Hips Don't Lie held them of the top spot. It ended 2006 as being the UK's fifteenth best selling single.

Pop band McFly scored their fifth UK number one single Don't Stop Me Now/Please, Please but the following week dropped to number 6 in the top 40. The week after Shakira climbed back on top with "Hips Don't Lie", the first time since 2004's single Call on Me by Eric Prydz to return to the top. July also saw first time number one albums for the Lostprophets and Razorlight.

In August, it was an American female double on top of both charts, with Christina Aguilera's Back To Basics topping the album chart, and the following week former Destiny's Child star Beyoncé Knowles scored her second (fourth, including her career with the group) number one single with Deja Vu along with her boyfriend Jay-Z.

September kicked off with another American act at #1 in both charts, this time former 'N Sync star Justin Timberlake with his comeback single SexyBack and with his second album FutureSex/LoveSounds. He had previously has three number two records and this is his first #1 single as a solo artist and as part of 'N Sync.

The following week the Scissor Sisters managed to score their first UK #1 with I Don't Feel Like Dancin' and is third highest seller (so far) of this year. They also scored their second #1 in the album chart with Ta-Dah, therefore topping both the album and singles chart at the same time (the last act to manage that was Gnarls Barkley with Crazy and St. Elsewhere).

In October, Girls Aloud became the first British act (sixth act overall) to enter the UK Top 10 on downloads alone when Something Kinda Ooooh charted at #5 on 22 October. The following week it climbed to #3, but they were beaten to number one by McFly with their sixth number one Star Girl. We also saw #1 albums from The Killers, Robbie Williams, Girls Aloud and Jamiroquai.

November saw Dutch DJ and producer Fedde Le Grand manage to get his first UK #1 with Put Your Hands Up For Detroit, while Westlife were still breaking records with their 14 number one The Rose. Westlife didn't last long at the top and later got replaced by rapstar Akon with Smack That which featured the rap music legend Eminem; this was Akon's second and Eminem's seventh number one single.

In November and early December, the charts were dominated by boy bands. Ten years since their last number one single, Take That managed to reclaim their position on top of the singles chart with Patience. Meanwhile, Westlife's number one streak continued with their sixth #1 album The Love Album beating compilation albums from Oasis, The Beatles and U2. This was then knocked off the top by Take That's album Beautiful World. These remained on top of the charts for two more weeks. During this time there were hit singles from Emma Bunton's Official Children in Need song Downtown, Chris Cornell's You Know My Name which was used in Casino Royale, Cliff Richard's 21st Century Christmas and Wind It Up from No Doubt front woman Gwen Stefani.

The X Factor was won by Leona Lewis, beating former child actor Raymond Quinn in the final. She became the first female winner of the show. Her debut single "A Moment Like This" was chosen for whoever won the competition and was released on download the day after the final, selling 50,000 copies in its first half-hour, more than most songs this year achieved in a whole week.

== Record sales ==
Single sales bounced back in 2006 as legal downloads added nearly thirty million sales to the total for the year. Despite this, the 17,694 copies sold during its week at number one gave Orson's "No Tomorrow" the distinction of being the lowest sales ever of a chart topper. However 2006 also saw one song achieve sales of over half a million in its first week, Leona Lewis's song "A Moment Like This" sold 571,992 copies. Although not the biggest first week sales of any of the UK television talent show winners it was still a remarkable figure when total sales of individual records were generally in decline.

As of year end, Gnarls Barkley's single "Crazy", had sold over 800,000 (plus an additional 40,000+ before it became chart eligible) to become the best selling single of 2006, while Leona Lewis had the second biggest seller of the year and enjoyed a second week at number one as 2006 became 2007. The rest of the top five best sellers saw Shakira at three with over 500,000 copies sold in what was a very long chart run, Scissor Sisters were fourth and Sandi Thom was fifth in the overall sales list.

== Charts ==
=== Number-one singles ===
Chart date (week ending)	Song	Artist(s)	Sales
7 January	"That's My Goal"	Shayne Ward	132,284
14 January	"That's My Goal"	Shayne Ward	54,152
21 January	"That's My Goal"	Shayne Ward	31,724
28 January	"When the Sun Goes Down"	Arctic Monkeys	34,992
4 February	"Nasty Girl"	The Notorious B.I.G. featuring Diddy, Nelly, Jagged Edge & Avery Storm	27,482
11 February	"Nasty Girl"	The Notorious B.I.G. featuring Diddy, Nelly, Jagged Edge & Avery Storm	24,854
18 February	"Thunder in My Heart Again"	Meck featuring Leo Sayer	36,185
25 February	"Thunder in My Heart Again"	Meck featuring Leo Sayer	33,635
4 March	"Sorry"	Madonna	36,928
11 March	"It's Chico Time"	Chico	51,000
18 March	"It's Chico Time"	Chico	29,000
25 March	"No Tomorrow"	Orson	17,694
1 April	"So Sick"	Ne-Yo	28,287
8 April	"Crazy"	Gnarls Barkley	31,709
15 April	"Crazy"	Gnarls Barkley	194,179
22 April	"Crazy"	Gnarls Barkley	118,714
29 April	"Crazy"	Gnarls Barkley	76,114
6 May	"Crazy"	Gnarls Barkley	69,202
13 May	"Crazy"	Gnarls Barkley	50,163
20 May	"Crazy"	Gnarls Barkley	42,968
27 May	"Crazy"	Gnarls Barkley	40,000
3 June	"Crazy"	Gnarls Barkley	37,682
10 June	"I Wish I Was a Punk Rocker (With Flowers in My Hair)"	Sandi Thom	39,797
17 June	"Maneater"	Nelly Furtado	48,724
24 June	"Maneater"	Nelly Furtado	42,859
1 July	"Maneater"	Nelly Furtado	34,537
8 July	"Hips Don't Lie"	Shakira featuring Wyclef Jean	32,584
15 July	"Smile"	Lily Allen	39,501
22 July	"Smile"	Lily Allen	35,228
29 July	"Don't Stop Me Now" / "Please, Please"	McFly	36,469
5 August	"Hips Don't Lie"	Shakira featuring Wyclef Jean	29,109
12 August	"Hips Don't Lie"	Shakira featuring Wyclef Jean	33,400
19 August	"Hips Don't Lie"	Shakira featuring Wyclef Jean	28,638
26 August	"Hips Don't Lie"	Shakira featuring Wyclef Jean	29,955
2 September	"Déjà Vu"	Beyoncé featuring Jay Z	29,365
9 September	"SexyBack"	Justin Timberlake featuring Timbaland	49,556
16 September	"I Don't Feel Like Dancin'"	Scissor Sisters	66,757
23 September	"I Don't Feel Like Dancin'"	Scissor Sisters	56,044
30 September	"I Don't Feel Like Dancin'"	Scissor Sisters	42,310
7 October	"I Don't Feel Like Dancin'"	Scissor Sisters	32,338
14 October	"America"	Razorlight	32,753
21 October	"Welcome to the Black Parade"	My Chemical Romance	33,883
28 October	"Welcome to the Black Parade"	My Chemical Romance	29,201
4 November	"Star Girl"	McFly	54,802
11 November	"Put Your Hands Up for Detroit"	Fedde Le Grand	34,391
18 November	"The Rose"	Westlife	44,305
25 November	"Smack That"	Akon featuring Eminem	35,119
2 December	"Patience"	Take That	61,978
9 December	"Patience"	Take That	38,337
16 December	"Patience"	Take That	37,894
23 December	"Patience"	Take That	30,833
30 December	"A Moment Like This"	Leona Lewis	571,253

=== Number-one single downloads ===
Chart date (week ending)	Song	Artist(s)
7 January	"That's My Goal"	Shayne Ward
14 January	"JCB Song"	Nizlopi
21 January	"JCB Song"	Nizlopi
28 January	"Nasty Girl"	The Notorious B.I.G. featuring Diddy, Nelly, Jagged Edge & Avery Storm
4 February	"Nasty Girl"	The Notorious B.I.G. featuring Diddy, Nelly, Jagged Edge & Avery Storm
11 February	"Boys Will Be Boys"	The Ordinary Boys
18 February	"Thunder in My Heart Again"	Meck featuring Leo Sayer
25 February	"Thunder in My Heart Again"	Meck featuring Leo Sayer
4 March	"Put Your Records On"	Corinne Bailey Rae
11 March	"Put Your Records On"	Corinne Bailey Rae
18 March	"No Tomorrow"	Orson
25 March	"Crazy"	Gnarls Barkley
1 April	"Crazy"	Gnarls Barkley
8 April	"Crazy"	Gnarls Barkley
15 April	"Crazy"	Gnarls Barkley
22 April	"Crazy"	Gnarls Barkley
29 April	"Crazy"	Gnarls Barkley
6 May	"Crazy"	Gnarls Barkley
13 May	"Crazy"	Gnarls Barkley
20 May	"Crazy"	Gnarls Barkley
27 May	"Crazy"	Gnarls Barkley
3 June	"Crazy"	Gnarls Barkley
10 June	"I Wish I Was a Punk Rocker (With Flowers in My Hair)"	Sandi Thom
17 June	"Maneater"	Nelly Furtado
24 June	"Maneater"	Nelly Furtado
1 July	"Maneater"	Nelly Furtado
8 July	"Maneater"	Nelly Furtado
15 July	"Hips Don't Lie"	Shakira featuring Wyclef Jean
22 July	"Hips Don't Lie"	Shakira featuring Wyclef Jean
29 July	"Hips Don't Lie"	Shakira featuring Wyclef Jean
5 August	"Hips Don't Lie"	Shakira featuring Wyclef Jean
12 August	"SexyBack"	Justin Timberlake featuring Timbaland
19 August	"Hips Don't Lie"	Shakira featuring Wyclef Jean
26 August	"I Don't Feel Like Dancin'"	Scissor Sisters
2 September	"I Don't Feel Like Dancin'"	Scissor Sisters
9 September	"I Don't Feel Like Dancin'"	Scissor Sisters
16 September	"I Don't Feel Like Dancin'"	Scissor Sisters
23 September	"I Don't Feel Like Dancin'"	Scissor Sisters
30 September	"I Don't Feel Like Dancin'"	Scissor Sisters
7 October	"I Don't Feel Like Dancin'"	Scissor Sisters
14 October	"America"	Razorlight
21 October	"America"	Razorlight
28 October	"America"	Razorlight
4 November	"Star Girl"	McFly
11 November	"Put Your Hands Up for Detroit"	Fedde Le Grand
18 November	"Rock Steady"	All Saints
25 November	"Patience"	Take That
2 December	"Patience"	Take That
9 December	"Patience"	Take That
16 December	"Patience"	Take That
23 December	"A Moment Like This"	Leona Lewis
30 December	"A Moment Like This"	Leona Lewis

=== Number-one albums ===
Chart date (week ending)	Album	Artist	Sales
7 January	Curtain Call: The Hits	Eminem	58,369
14 January	First Impressions of Earth	The Strokes	63,046
21 January	Back to Bedlam	James Blunt	35,385
28 January	Stars of CCTV	Hard-Fi	50,310
4 February	Whatever People Say I Am, That's What I'm Not	Arctic Monkeys	363,735
11 February	Whatever People Say I Am, That's What I'm Not	Arctic Monkeys	162,169
18 February	Whatever People Say I Am, That's What I'm Not	Arctic Monkeys	95,007
25 February	Whatever People Say I Am, That's What I'm Not	Arctic Monkeys	79,241
4 March	In Between Dreams	Jack Johnson	46,749
11 March	Corinne Bailey Rae	Corinne Bailey Rae	108,181
18 March	On an Island	David Gilmour	83,060
25 March	Corinne Bailey Rae	Corinne Bailey Rae	50,732
1 April	Journey South	Journey South	216,843
8 April	This New Day	Embrace	76,322
15 April	Ringleader of the Tormentors	Morrissey	62,709
22 April	The Hardest Way to Make an Easy Living	The Streets	71,407
29 April	Shayne Ward	Shayne Ward	201,266
6 May	St. Elsewhere	Gnarls Barkley	91,195
13 May	Eyes Open	Snow Patrol	126,809
20 May	Stadium Arcadium	Red Hot Chili Peppers	202,499
27 May	Stadium Arcadium	Red Hot Chili Peppers	80,087
3 June	Stadium Arcadium	Red Hot Chili Peppers	52,146
10 June	Bright Idea	Orson	47,542
17 June	Smile... It Confuses People	Sandi Thom	51,128
24 June	Under the Iron Sea	Keane	222,297
1 July	Under the Iron Sea	Keane	79,438
8 July	Liberation Transmission	Lostprophets	55,425
15 July	Black Holes and Revelations	Muse	115,144
22 July	Black Holes and Revelations	Muse	47,519
29 July	Razorlight	Razorlight	106,805
5 August	Razorlight	Razorlight	66,591
12 August	Undiscovered	James Morrison	84,511
19 August	Undiscovered	James Morrison	55,852
26 August	Back to Basics	Christina Aguilera	84,279
2 September	Eyes Open	Snow Patrol	49,772
9 September	Empire	Kasabian	109,397
16 September	Eyes Open	Snow Patrol	45,450
23 September	FutureSex/LoveSounds	Justin Timberlake	90,985
30 September	Ta-Dah	Scissor Sisters	288,167
7 October	Ta-Dah	Scissor Sisters	134,953
14 October	Sam's Town	The Killers	268,946
21 October	Sam's Town	The Killers	82,300
28 October	Sam's Town	The Killers	48,152
4 November	Rudebox	Robbie Williams	147,236
11 November	The Sound of Girls Aloud	Girls Aloud	84,354
18 November	High Times: Singles 1992–2006	Jamiroquai	78,957
25 November	Twenty Five	George Michael	100,502
2 December	The Love Album	Westlife	219,662
9 December	Beautiful World	Take That	168,954
16 December	Beautiful World	Take That	199,185
23 December	Beautiful World	Take That	229,001
30 December	Beautiful World	Take That	443,070

=== Number-one compilation albums ===
Chart date (week ending)	Album
7 January	Now 62
14 January	Clubbers Guide 2006
21 January	Clubbers Guide 2006
28 January	Clubbers Guide 2006
4 February	Clubbers Guide 2006
11 February	R&B Love Songs
18 February	R&B Love Songs
25 February	R&B Love Songs
4 March	BRIT Awards 2006
11 March	The Mash Up Mix 2006
18 March	Clubland X-Treme Hardcore 2
25 March	Clubland X-Treme Hardcore 2
1 April	World's Best Mum
8 April	Floorfillers – Club Classics
15 April	Floorfillers – Club Classics
22 April	Now 63
29 April	Now 63
6 May	Now 63
13 May	Now 63
20 May	Now 63
27 May	Big Club Hits
3 June	Big Club Hits
10 June	Big Club Hits
17 June	England – The Album
24 June	Dad Rocks
1 July	Clubbers Guide Summer 2006
8 July	Clubland 9
15 July	Clubland 9
22 July	Clubland 9
29 July	Clubland 9
5 August	Now 64
12 August	Now 64
19 August	Now 64
26 August	Now 64
2 September	Now 64
9 September	Now 64
16 September	Dance Mania
23 September	Dance Mania
30 September	Dance Mania
7 October	High School Musical
14 October	High School Musical
21 October	High School Musical
28 October	Radio 1's Live Lounge
4 November	High School Musical
11 November	Radio 1's Live Lounge
18 November	Clubland 10
25 November	Pop Party 4
2 December	Now 65
9 December	Now 65
16 December	Now 65
23 December	Now 65
30 December	Now 65

=== Number-one album downloads ===
Chart date (week ending)	Album	Artist
15 April	This New Day	Embrace
22 April	The Hardest Way to Make an Easy Living	The Streets
29 April	Shayne Ward	Shayne Ward
6 May	St. Elsewhere	Gnarls Barkley
13 May	Eyes Open	Snow Patrol
20 May	Stadium Arcadium	Red Hot Chili Peppers
27 May	Eyes Open	Snow Patrol
3 June	Eyes Open	Snow Patrol
10 June	The Garden	Zero 7
17 June	Twelve Stops and Home	The Feeling
24 June	Under the Iron Sea	Keane
1 July	Under the Iron Sea	Keane
8 July	Under the Iron Sea	Keane
15 July	Black Holes and Revelations	Muse
22 July	Black Holes and Revelations	Muse
29 July	Razorlight	Razorlight
5 August	Razorlight	Razorlight
12 August	Undiscovered	James Morrison
19 August	Undiscovered	James Morrison
26 August	Back to Basics	Christina Aguilera
2 September	Eyes Open	Snow Patrol
9 September	Eyes Open	Snow Patrol
16 September	Eyes Open	Snow Patrol
23 September	FutureSex/LoveSounds	Justin Timberlake
30 September	Ta-Dah	Scissor Sisters
7 October	Ta-Dah	Scissor Sisters
14 October	Sam's Town	The Killers
21 October	Sam's Town	The Killers
28 October	Razorlight	Razorlight
4 November	Rudebox	Robbie Williams
11 November	Back to Black	Amy Winehouse
18 November	9	Damien Rice
25 November	Twenty Five	George Michael
2 December	Stop the Clocks	Oasis
9 December	Beautiful World	Take That
16 December	Beautiful World	Take That
23 December	Beautiful World	Take That
30 December	Beautiful World	Take That

== Year-end charts ==
Between 31 December 2005 and 31 December 2006.

=== Best-selling singles ===
Source: Music Week

No.	Title	Artist	Peak position	Sales
1	"Crazy"	Gnarls Barkley	1	820,000
2	"A Moment Like This"	Leona Lewis	1	700,069
3	"Hips Don't Lie"	Shakira featuring Wyclef Jean	1	495,000
4	"I Don't Feel Like Dancin'"	Scissor Sisters	1	353,733
5	"I Wish I Was a Punk Rocker (With Flowers in My Hair)"	Sandi Thom	1	325,600
6	"From Paris to Berlin"	Infernal	2	308,000
7	"Maneater"	Nelly Furtado	1	296,000
8	"Patience"	Take That	1	282,423
9	"SOS"	Rihanna	2	243,000
10	"SexyBack"	Justin Timberlake	1	241,250
11	"Smile"	Lily Allen	1	228,500
12	"No Tomorrow"	Orson	1	227,000
13	"Nasty Girl"	The Notorious B.I.G. featuring Diddy, Nelly, Jagged Edge & Avery Storm	1	222,000
14	"Chasing Cars"	Snow Patrol	6	210,606
15	"Everytime We Touch"	Cascada	2	201,000
16	"No Promises"	Shayne Ward	2	197,500
17	"America"	Razorlight	1	197,000
18	"That's My Goal"	Shayne Ward	1	196,000
19	"Naïve"	The Kooks	5	186,000
20	"Put Your Hands Up for Detroit"	Fedde le Grand	1	184,000
21	"Monster"	The Automatic	4	182,500
22	"Thunder in My Heart Again"	Meck featuring Leo Sayer	1	181,500
23	"Unfaithful"	Rihanna	2	177,250
24	"Put Your Records On"	Corinne Bailey Rae	2	174,000
25	"You Give Me Something"	James Morrison	5	171,000
26	"Welcome to the Black Parade"	My Chemical Romance	1	169,000
27	"Smack That"	Akon featuring Eminem	1	166,250
28	"Voodoo Child"	Rogue Traders	3	163,500
29	"Irreplaceable"	Beyoncé	4	158,000
30	"Who Knew"	Pink	5	157,500
31	"Beep"	The Pussycat Dolls featuring will.i.am	2	157,000
32	"So Sick"	Ne-Yo	1	152,250
33	"Ain't No Other Man"	Christina Aguilera	2	152,000
34	"Pump It"	The Black Eyed Peas	3	148,500
35	"One"	Mary J. Blige and U2	2	148,000
36	"Something Kinda Ooooh"	Girls Aloud	3	147,000
37	"JCB"	Nizlopi	2 (Note: Reached number 1 in 2005)	146,500
38	"Promiscuous"	Nelly Furtado featuring Timbaland	3	141,500
39	"She Moves in Her Own Way"	The Kooks	7	141,000
40	"It's Chico Time"	Chico	1	140,500
41	"Ridin'"	Chamillionaire featuring Krayzie Bone	2	140,000
42	"Somebody's Watching Me"	Beatfreakz	3	137,000
43	"Dani California"	Red Hot Chili Peppers	2	136,500
44	"Sorry"	Madonna	1	136,000
45	"Last Request"	Paolo Nutini	5	134,500
46	"Love Don't Let Me Go (Walking Away)"	David Guetta vs. The Egg	3	132,000
47	"When You Were Young"	The Killers	2	130,000
48	"Control Myself"	LL Cool J featuring Jennifer Lopez	2	129,000
49	"Boys Will Be Boys"	The Ordinary Boys	3	127,000
50	"Me & U"	Cassie	6	124,000

=== Best-selling albums ===
No.	Title	Artist	Peak position	Sales
1	Eyes Open	Snow Patrol	1	1,504,000
2	Beautiful World	Take That	1	1,122,000
3	Ta-Dah	Scissor Sisters	1	1,120,000
4	Whatever People Say I Am, That's What I'm Not	Arctic Monkeys	1	1,111,000
5	Inside In/Inside Out	The Kooks	2	1,099,000
6	Razorlight	Razorlight	1	1,067,000
7	Stop the Clocks	Oasis	2	898,000
8	The Love Album	Westlife	1	891,000
9	I'm Not Dead	Pink	3	844,000
10	Undiscovered	James Morrison	1	839,000
11	In Between Dreams	Jack Johnson	1	788,000
12	Sam's Town	The Killers	1	770,000
13	Corinne Bailey Rae	Corinne Bailey Rae	1	763,000
14	Under the Iron Sea	Keane	1	699,000
15	Stadium Arcadium	Red Hot Chili Peppers	1	682,000
16	The Sound of Girls Aloud: The Greatest Hits	Girls Aloud	1	664,000
17	Love	The Beatles	3	663,000
18	Twenty Five	George Michael	1	617,000
19	U218 Singles	U2	4	609,000
20	Siempre	Il Divo	2	609,000
21	Twelve Stops and Home	The Feeling	2	592,000
22	Back to Bedlam	James Blunt	1	585,000
23	Costello Music	The Fratellis	2	552,000
24	These Streets	Paolo Nutini	3	552,000
25	FutureSex/LoveSounds	Justin Timberlake	1	546,000
26	Black Holes and Revelations	Muse	1	541,000
27	High Times: Singles 1992–2006	Jamiroquai	1	539,000
28	PCD	Pussycat Dolls	10 (Note: Reached number 7 in 2005)	533,000
29	Alright, Still	Lily Allen	2	519,000
30	Breakaway	Kelly Clarkson	3	506,000
31	St. Elsewhere	Gnarls Barkley	1	489,300
32	Employment	Kaiser Chiefs	2	489,232
33	Collected	Massive Attack	2	461,000
34	Eye to the Telescope	KT Tunstall	3	459,300
35	Shayne Ward	Shayne Ward	1	459,200
36	Rudebox	Robbie Williams	1	451,000
37	Tired of Hanging Around	The Zutons	2	445,000
38	Keep On	Will Young	4 (Note: Reached number 2 in 2005)	444,500
39	Loose	Nelly Furtado	5	440,000
40	The Very Best of Nina Simone	Nina Simone	6	440,000
41	Overloaded: The Singles Collection	Sugababes	3	441,000
42	Demon Days	Gorillaz	6 (Note: Reached number 1 in 2005)	411,000
43	Empire	Kasabian	1	406,000
44	Journey South	Journey South	1	404,500
45	A Girl like Me	Rihanna	5	390,000
46	Confessions on a Dancefloor	Madonna	9 (Note: Reached number 1 in 2005)	384,900
47	Voices of the Valley	Fron Male Voice Choir	9	384,600
48	The Singles	Feeder	2	384,300
49	X&Y	Coldplay	8 (Note: Reached number 1 in 2005)	374,000
50	The Truth About Love	Lemar	3	369,000

=== Best-selling compilations ===
No.	Title	Peak position
1	Now 65	1
2	Now 64	1
3	Radio 1's Live Lounge	1
4	High School Musical (Original Soundtrack)	1
5	Now 63	1
6	Pop Party 4	1
7	Floorfillers: Club Classics	1
8	NME Presents the Essential Bands 2006	3
9	The Anthems	2
10	Clubland 9	1

== Music awards ==
=== BRIT Awards ===
The 2006 BRIT Awards took place on 15 February 2006, at Earl's Court in London

- Best British Male Solo Artist: James Blunt
- Best British Female Solo Artist: KT Tunstall
- Best British Group: Kaiser Chiefs
- Best British Album: Coldplay - X&Y
- Best British Single: Coldplay - "Speed of Sound"
- Best British Rock Act: Kaiser Chiefs
- Best British Urban Act: Lemar
- Best British Live Act: Kaiser Chiefs
- British Breakthrough Artist: Arctic Monkeys
- Best Pop Act: James Blunt
- Best International Male Solo Artist: Kanye West
- Best International Female Solo Artist: Madonna
- Best International Group: Green Day
- Best International Album: Green Day - American Idiot
- International Breakthrough Artist: Jack Johnson
- Outstanding Contribution to Music: Paul Weller

=== Mercury Music Prize ===
The 2006 Mercury Music Prize was awarded to Arctic Monkeys - Whatever People Say I Am, That's What I'm Not

=== Popjustice £20 Music Prize ===
The 2006 Popjustice £20 Music Prize was awarded to Girls Aloud for their song Biology from the album Chemistry.

=== Record of the Year ===
The Record of the Year was awarded to "Patience" by Take That.

== See also ==
- List of UK Singles Chart number ones of the 2000s
- List of UK Independent Singles Chart number ones of 2006
- List of UK Rock & Metal Singles Chart number ones of 2006
