= George Best – A Tribute =

Single by Brian Kennedy and Peter Corry

"George Best - A Tribute"

Single by Brian Kennedy and Peter Corry
- Released: 26 December 2005
- Recorded: 3 December 2005
- Genre: Jazz, Easy listening
- Label: Curb Records
- Producer: Frank Gallagher

"George Best – A Tribute" is a single released by Brian Kennedy and Peter Corry as a tribute to former Northern Irish professional footballer George Best. It features songs Kennedy and Corry performed at Best's funeral service, and the single was released with proceeds going to the George Best Foundation. The single reached No. 4 in the UK chart and No. 3 in Ireland.

== Background ==
In November 2005, George Best died following an illness. At his funeral service held on 3 December 2005, Peter Corry performed "Bring Him Home" and "The Long and Winding Road", while Brian Kennedy performed "Vincent" and "You Raise Me Up". Due to popular demand for the music performed at the funeral, Kennedy and Corry recorded the songs with the support of Best's family.

The songs were recorded live at Stormont Buildings in Belfast, and feature the vocals of the Grosvenor Chorale, The Chapel Choir of Methodist College Belfast, and the Stormont Sinfonia featuring members of the Ulster Orchestra and Camerata Ireland. The single was produced by Frank Gallagher.

The single was released on Boxing Day in 2005, a month after Best's death. Three tracks were released in the single: "You Raise Me Up", "The Long and Winding Road", and a medley of "Bring Him Home" and "Vincent". All profits from sales of the single were donated to The George Best Foundation.

The single reached a peak of position number four in the UK Singles Chart in January 2006, staying in the chart for 11 weeks.

== Track listing ==
1. "You Raise Me Up" (Brian Kennedy) – 4:11
2. "The Long and Winding Road" (Peter Corry) – 3:34
3. "Bring Him Home" / "Vincent" (Brian Kennedy and Peter Corry) – 4:14

== Charts ==
Chart (2006)	Peak position
Europe (Eurochart Hot 100)	16
Ireland (IRMA)	3
Scotland Singles (OCC)	5
UK Singles (OCC)	4
UK Indie (OCC)	1
