= Angelis (album) =

Studio album by Angelis
- Released: November 6, 2006
- Recorded: 2006
- Genre: Classical crossover
- Length: 39:12
- Label: Sony BMG

Angelis is the only album from British Classical crossover singing group Angelis, released in the United Kingdom on the 6 November 2006. It reached number 2 in the official British music chart and sold over 350,000 copies and received platinum status. The group members received a platinum disc on GMTV.

== Track listing ==
1. "Angel" – 4:26
2. "Pie Jesu" – 3:16
3. "Somewhere over the Rainbow" – 3:36
4. "Silent Night" – 2:13
5. "Pokarekare Ana" – 2:36
6. "Even Though You're Gone" – 4:11
7. "Walking in the Air" – 3:51
8. "Morning Has Broken" – 2:51
9. "May It Be" – 3:50
10. "Cantero" – 4:03
11. "O, Holy Night" – 4:15
