= Dancing in the Dark (Jessy song) =

2006 song by Jessy

"Dancing in the Dark" is a song originally recorded by Belgian singer Jessy. In 2006, she worked with British DJ Micky Modelle to produce a remix of the song. The remix was very successful and charted in many countries across Europe, peaking at top ten in three of them.

== Formats & track listing ==
First release

- CD single
1. "Dancing in the Dark (Radio Mix)" 4:15
2. "Dancing in the Dark (Piano Mix)" 3:55

Second release, with Micky Modelle

- CD single
1. "Dancing in the Dark (Radio Mix)" 4:15
2. "Dancing in the Dark (the Source Now Voyager Edit)" 3:22
3. "Dancing in the Dark (Radio Edit)" 3:24
4. "Dancing in the Dark (Instrumental)" 3:23
- CD single (Belgium)
1. "Dancing in the Dark (the Source Now Voyager Edit)" 3:22
2. "Dancing in the Dark (Radio Edit)" 3:24
3. "Dancing in the Dark (Dancing DJs Edit)" 4:35
- CD maxi (UK)
1. "Dancing in the Dark (Radio Edit)" 3:24
2. "Dancing in the Dark (the Source Now Voyager Edit)" 3:22
3. "Dancing in the Dark (Extended Mix)" 6:27
4. "Dancing in the Dark (Dancing DJs Remix)" 6:27
5. "Dancing in the Dark (Alex K Remix)" 6:53
6. "Dancing in the Dark (Original Mix)" 6:16
7. "Dancing in the Dark (KB Project Remix)" 6:31

== Chart performance ==
- Micky Modelle Remix

Chart (2006)	Peak Position
Belgium (Ultratip Bubbling Under Flanders)	7
Sweden (Sverigetopplistan)	9
Ireland (IRMA)	5
UK Singles (the Official Charts Company)	10
