= Angelis =

British classical singing group

Background information
- Origin: United Kingdom
- Genres: Choir; classical; pop
- Years active: 2006–2007
- Labels: Sony BMG (2006–07); Syco (2006–07); Virgin (2006); BMG (2007)
- Past members: Amy Dow; Camilla Seale; Sam Adams-Nye; Natalie Grace Chua; Moray West; Joe Martin

Angelis was a British classical singing group created by Simon Cowell. It was initially formed in early 2006 and was made up of six children, who were then aged between 11 and 14. The children were discovered during nationwide auditions led by Ron Corp and from recommendations and contacts with some UK choirs, including the Royal Scottish National Orchestra and New London Children's Choir.

Their eponymous debut album was released on 6 November 2006. It sold over 350,000 copies and reached platinum status, reaching number two on the UK album charts and Number one on the Scottish album charts. The group members received a platinum disc on GMTV. In early 2007, Cowell disbanded the group, partly as a result of complications with a planned overseas tour.

== Discography ==
=== Studio albums ===
Year	Album details	Chart peak positions
Year	Album details	UK
2006	Angelis: Released: November 6, 2006; Label: Syco Music; Formats: CD, digital download	2
