= Micky Modelle =

- Born: Michael Modine; 20 August 1972 (age 53); Belfast, Northern Ireland
- Genres: Dance, hardcore
- Years active: 1999–present
- Label: AATW
- Website: www.mickymodelle.com

Micky Modelle (born Michael Modine in 1972) is a disc jockey and record producer from Belfast, Northern Ireland.

== Career ==
He came into the media spotlight in 2006, when he had a hit with Belgian singer Jessy, a remix of "Dancing in the Dark" which was originally released by Jessy in 2004 in Belgium. After meeting Jessy, he remixed the song in 2006, and this version gained him chart success. It peaked at number ten on the UK Singles Chart, number five in Ireland and number seven in Jessy's native Belgium. The song also peaked at number twenty five in Switzerland. The second single, "Over You" achieved moderate success, peaking at number thirty-five on the UK Singles Chart and number eighteen on the Irish Singles Chart.

Later on in 2008, he reworked Samantha Mumba's "Gotta Tell You" of which she re-recorded the vocals to fit the song. A music video was shot in London and Dublin. She promoted the song on the Clubland Live Tour in 2008, but it did not chart on the UK Singles Chart, but did peak at number forty on the UK Dance Chart. He also joined the judging panel of the Belfast CityBeat contest Young Star Search. He was to produce the singles for winners Rachel Pearson and Caitlin McClurg.

Modelle was named DJ of the year in Ireland in 2000.

== Discography ==
=== Singles ===
Year	Single	Chart positions			
Year	Single	UK	IRL	BEL (FL)	SWE
2006	"Dancing in the Dark" (With Jessy)	10	5	7	9
2006	"Over You" (With Jessy)	35	18	—	—
2007	"Show Me Heaven" (With Jessy)	—	—	—	—
2008	"Take Me Away"	—	—	—	—
2008	"Gotta Tell You" (With Samantha Mumba)	—	—	—	—
2009	"Whine Up" (vs. Ghetto Busterz)	—	—	—	—
2022	"Superstar" (with Simone Denny and Belters Only)	—	62	—	—

=== Remixes ===
Year	Original artist	Original song
2004	Eamon	"Fuck It"
2004	Crush On	"Real Shy"
2006	Dancing DJs	"Right Beside You"
2007	Yomtrax	"The Sound"
2008	Corona	"The Rhythm of the Night"
2008	Scooter	"The Question Is What Is the Question?"
2009	Flo Rida	"Sugar"
2009	Ultrabeat	"Use Somebody" (Kings of Leon cover)
2009	N-Force	"All My Life"
2010	Milk Inc.	"Sunrise (Part 2)"
