= Jessy De Smet =

Belgian singer

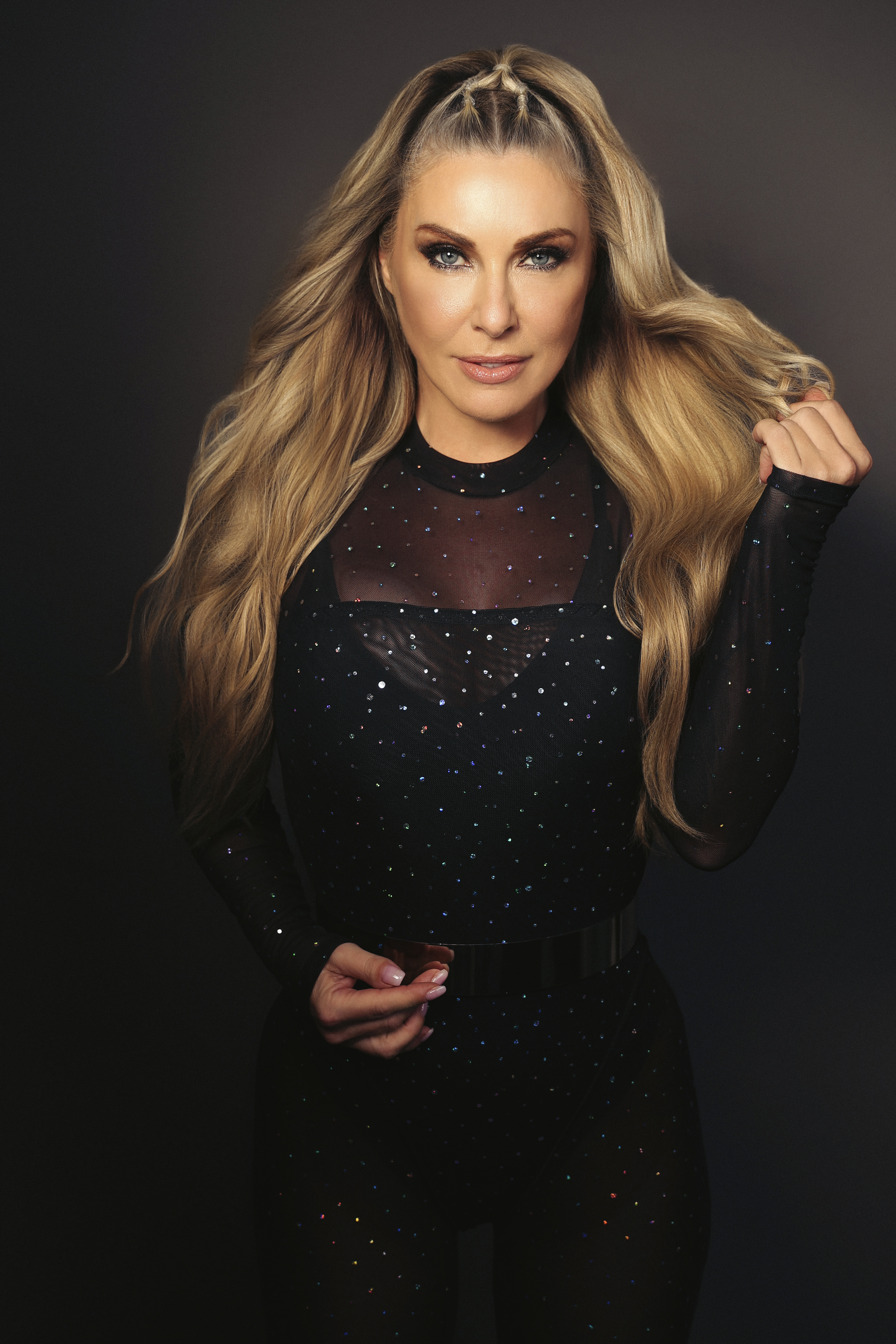
- Jessy De Smet (2012)
- Born: 8 July 1976 (age 50); Zottegem, Belgium
- Other name: Jessy
- Occupation: Singer
- Website: jessy-music.com

Jessy De Smet, whose stage name is Jessy (born 8 July 1976), is a Belgian dance music singer of Flemish origin. who had several gold records in the late 1990s and 2000s.

She started her career in 1995 as a member of Belgian dance act The Mackenzie. They had a number of hits and won a TMF Award for best album in 1999 with Angel. In 2001, Jessy decided to leave The Mackenzie and go solo.

In 2002, she released her solo record Rain, produced by Regi Penxten, the man behind the popular group Milk Inc.

The single "Look at Me Now" became a hit in Belgium and the UK, and launched her solo career. After this success, she worked with international acts, such as Verheyen & Vanvaeck, Sash!, Linda (Milk Inc), DJ Rebel, Michael Beltran and Mickey Modelle. Modelle launched her back into the UK Singles Chart with a reworked version of "Dancing in the Dark".

In 2011, Jessy released a greatest hits compilation, The Ultimate Jessy – Best Of 1995–2012, including the new single "Angel" with the American rapper Kaliq Scott. In 2012, she released "Innocence '12", a remake of her signature song that launched her career in the 1990s. It featured the Belgian urban artist, Abie Flinston, and was produced by Penxten.

In 2015, she released Glorious, her third album.

In 2017 she released "Walking On Air" with Pitbull. During the covid pandemic the single "Reality" was released but failed to chart. Around that time, Jessy's mother, also a singer, participated in the Belgian version of The Voice Senior. She made it to the finals and started performing together with Jessy. They released a duet: "Christmas Time".

In 2024 Jessy released a discopop song called "Heartbeat". It got followed by "Love Is Love", a song written and released for the Antwerp Pride. By the end of the year she also made a track with the Belgian AI-artist Marcy Cortega: "Virtual Love".

In 2025, Jessy's vocals were sampled in the track "Angel" by Ben Hemsley.

She continues to tour and perform across Belgium. She has also performed at 90's and 00's festivals in Spain and the UK.

== Discography ==
=== Albums ===
List of albums, with selected chart positions
Title	Album details	Peak chart positions
Title	Album details	BEL (Fl)
Angel (With The Mackenzie)	Released: April 1999; Format: 2×CD; Label: Antler-Subway	1
Rain	Released: June 2004; Format: CD; Label: Oceanic	46
The Ultimate Jessy – Best Of 1995–2012	Released: November 2011; Format: CD, digital; Label: Mostiko	33
Glorious	Released: April 2015; Format: CD, digital; Label: BIP Records	47

=== Extended plays ===
List of EPs, with selected chart positions
Title	Album details	Peak chart positions
Title	Album details	BEL (Fl)
Live & Acoustic For MNM 90's Café	Released: April 2012; Format: 2×CD; Label: Mostiko	-

=== Charting singles ===
List of charted singles
Title	Year	Peak chart positions				Album
Title	Year	BEL (Fl)	IRL	SWE	UK	Album
"I Am Free" (The Mackenzie feat. Jessy)	1995	26	—	—	—	Angel
"Innocence" (The Mackenzie feat. Jessy)	1998	6	—	—	—	Angel
"Falling in Love" (The Mackenzie feat. Jessy)	1998	4	—	—	—	Angel
"Alive" (The Mackenzie feat. Jessy)	1998	7	—	—	—	Angel
"Out of Control" (The Mackenzie feat. Jessy)	1999	10	—	—	—	Angel
"The Rain" (The Mackenzie feat. Jessy)	1999	12	—	—	—	Angel
"Emotions" (The Mackenzie feat. Jessy)	1999	23	—	—	—	Angel (The Millennium Edition)
"Be My Lover" (The Mackenzie feat. Jessy)	2000	25	—	—	—	non album singles
"For You" (The Mackenzie feat. Jessy)	2000	20	—	—	—	non album singles
"All I Need" (The Mackenzie feat. Jessy)	2000	6	—	—	—	non album singles
"Walk Away" (The Mackenzie feat. Jessy)	2001	25	—	—	—	non album singles
"Look @ Me Now	2002	8	—	—	—	Rain
"Head Over Heels"	2003	11	—	—	—	Rain
"How Long (Point of No Return)"	2004	19	—	—	—	Rain
"Silent Tears"	2004	14	—	—	—	Rain
"Dancing in the Dark"	2004	41	—	—	—	Rain
"My Star" (Verheyen & Vanvaeck feat. Jessy)	2005	27	—	—	—	non album singles
"Dancing in the Dark" (Micky Modelle vs. Jessy)	2006	7 (tip)	5	9	10	non album singles
"Over You" (Micky Modelle vs. Jessy)	2006	—	18	—	35	non album singles
"Getting Out" (as Jessy & Linda)	2008	45	—	—	—	non album singles
"Missing"	2010	16	—	—	—	The Ultimate Jessy (Best Of 1995-2012)
"All Is Love" (with Sash!)	2010	16 (tip)	—	—	—	The Ultimate Jessy (Best Of 1995-2012)
"Think About the Way 2011" (with DJ Rebel)	2011	37	—	—	—	The Ultimate Jessy (Best Of 1995-2012)
"Angel" (featuring Kaliq Scott & Rebel)	2011	35	—	—	—	The Ultimate Jessy (Best Of 1995-2012)
"Innocence '12" (featuring Abie Flinstone)	2012	7	—	—	—	Live & Acoustic For MNM 90's Café
"Missing " (with Dennis)	2012	28	—	—	—	Live & Acoustic For MNM 90's Café
"Impossible " (featuring Ian Prada)	2012	25	—	—	—	non album singles
"Nothing at All"	2013	10	—	—	—	non album singles
"Bring Me Back To Life"	2013	30 (tip)	—	—	—	non album singles
"Beautiful"	2014	22 (tip)	—	—	—	non album singles
"Stars" (with Ian Prada feat. Gregoir Cruz)	2014	47 (tip)	—	—	—	Glorious
"Salvation" (with DJ F.R.A.N.K)	2014	35	—	—	—	Glorious
