= Peter Corry =

Northern Irish singer, producer and director

Peter Corry MBE
- Occupations: Singer, director, producer

Peter Andrew Corry MBE is a Northern Irish singer, director, producer and actor. As a performer Corry has been cast in productions of Così fan tutte, The Marriage of Figaro, Sweeney Todd: The Demon Barber of Fleet Street, On Eagle's Wing, The Last Five Years, Chess, The Beggar's Opera, and The Crocodile. He performed as Dean Martin in The Rat Pack, starred in Night of 1,000 Stars at the Royal Albert Hall and performed in The Music of Andrew Lloyd Webber. He spent three years playing Inspector Javert in the West End and the UK tour of Les Misérables.

He sang "Bring Him Home" and "The Long and Winding Road" at George Best's funeral. In 2006, he featured in Washington on Saint Patrick's Day and performed at the MGM Grand in Las Vegas, Nevada.

Corry has presented his own TV series, The Peter Corry Show with BBC Northern Ireland, and has hosted several radio series for BBC Radio Ulster. He starred in the stageshow On Eagle's Wing for PBS Television, and in "The Voice Within – Songs of Hope" on RTÉ Television.

He produced Les Misérables in Concert at Belfast's Odyssey Arena, at the time the largest production to be staged. Corry's production company also staged One Enchanted Evening and The Night of 1000 Voices at the Odyssey Arena starring David Essex, the cast of Riverdance, and Sir James Galway. His other productions include The Red Velvet Cabaret and Twilight at the Trust at Mount Stewart. He has directed productions of musicals Annie Get Your Gun, I Love You, You're Perfect, Now Change, Oklahoma!. He also produced the US tour of Celtic Rhythms and European tours of Irish Wings and The Magic of the Tenors.

In 2014, he staged a new show called Spectacular, Spectacular, which toured Ireland. He has also directed youth productions of The Producers, Oklahoma!, and Les Misérables. Corry has produced a number of other musicals at the Edinburgh Playhouse, Carlisle Memorial Church, and the SSE Arena Belfast. He produced, directed and hosted the Belfast Christmas special The Music Box from 2009 to 2016. He is the Artistic Director of the Belfast School of Performing Arts.

Peter Corry has recorded 11 solo albums and four production albums. He tours The Netherlands regularly; shows there have included "The Magical Rhythms of Ireland", "Celtic Rhythms" "Irish Christmas" and "Peter Corry in Concert".

Corry was appointed Member of the Order of the British Empire (MBE) in the 2023 Birthday Honours for services to music and the arts in Northern Ireland.
