= Beatfreakz =

Dutch house music band

- Also known as: Rockefeller, White Men Don't Funk, Pool Players Soul Corporation,
- Genre: House
- Years active: 2000–2008, 2020
- Label: Data
- Past members: Dennis Christopher (de Laat); Mark Simmons; ~~Errol Lafleur~~; ~~Dimitrie Siliakus~~

Beatfreakz (also spelled BeatFreakz) were a Dutch house group consisting of members Dennis Christopher, Dimitrie Siliakus and Mark Simmons. For a period of time, Errol Lafleur was also part of the group.

== History ==
The group was founded in 2000 by Dennis Christopher (born Dennis C. de Laat, Amsterdam), Dimitrie Siliakus (born 1978, The Hague) and Mark Simmons (born Mark Nieuwenhuijzen, Amsterdam).

The group's first big hit was a song making prominent use of a sample from Rockwell's hit "Somebody's Watching Me". Instead of using the original voice of Rockwell, a.k.a. Kenneth Gordy, they used the voice of Dennis Delano, a Dutch singer. The song peaked at #3 in the UK Singles Chart in May 2006 and peaked at #21 in the Dutch Top 100. It peaked at #28 in the Belgium UltraTop 50 and peaked at #38 in Australia. It also peaked at #41 in the German Chart. The music video was a parody of Michael Jackson's hit Thriller.

The band released the follow-up track "Superfreak", a Rick James remix, on 16 October 2006.

They revealed exclusively on BBC Radio 1's Chart Show on 15 October 2006, that their next project was likely to be a remix of the Ghostbusters theme tune, original from Ray Parker Jr. This track was previewed at the Matinee closing party in Ibiza on 30 September 2006.

Dimitrie Siliakus had left the group by November 2006.

Another song of theirs is released on the Put Your Hands Up! 2 compilation, a remake of Aerosmith's "Walk This Way".

In 2007, the group were credited in a remix of Marvin Gaye's "Sexual Healing" under their alias Rockefeller, as Alibi vs. Rockefeller, with a music video featuring three female dancers dressed as nurses (Lauren Ridealgh, Bayley Darling and Stephanie Fitzpatrick). It charted at #16 on the Finnish Singles Chart and at #34 on the UK Singles Chart.

The group has not had any activity under the Beatfreakz name since 2008, however the former members worked together in the years after.

== Discography ==
=== Singles ===
Year	Song	AUS	BEL	FIN	FRA	GER	IRE	NLD	NZL	SWI	UK
2000	"U Got da Feelin'"	-	-	-	-	-	-	-	-	-	-
2001	"Get Out of My Life"	-	-	-	-	-	-	-	-	-	-
2006	"Somebody's Watching Me"	38	28	7	18	41	8	21	7	65	3
2006	"Superfreak"	-	55	6	56	-	20	26	-	-	7
2007	"Bring the Ghost"	-	-	-	-	-	-	-	-	-	-
2007	"Walk This Way" (pres. Mark Simmons)	-	-	-	-	-	-	-	-	-	-
2008	"Rockstar"	-	-	-	-	-	-	-	-	-	-

=== Remixes ===
- 2006: Rockefeller – "Do It 2 Nite"
- 2006: The B.O.M.B feat. Sean Finn – "Skynight"
- 2006: Starkillers – "Discoteka"
- 2007: Royal Melody – "Blinded By The Light"
- 2007: Infernal – "I Won't Be Crying"
- 2007: Alibi vs. Rockefeller – "Sexual Healing"
