= It's Chico Time =

2006 single by Chico Slimani

Single by Chico
- Released: 27 February 2006
- Length: 2:46
- Label: Sony BMG
- Songwriters: Mark Hudson, Chico Slimani
- Producer: Mark Hudson

Chico singles chronology
"It's Chico Time" (2006)	"D.I.S.C.O." (2006)

"It's Chico Time" is the debut single of former The X Factor contestant Chico Slimani. The single was released on 27 February 2006. The song was written and composed by Mark Hudson.

== Background ==
Chico first performed the song on The X Factor on 19 November 2005. It was the only time that a contestant had performed an original song during the live stages of the show, until series 9, when contestant Lucy Spraggan performed her own track, "Mountains". The track was released on the back of the success of the performance and peaked at number one on the UK Singles Chart on 5 March 2006, toppling Madonna's hit single "Sorry" and staying at the top of the chart for two weeks. Chico became the first X Factor runner-up to have his debut single peak at number one.

The general theme of the song is to not take life too seriously, and to just party – as life is too short. Chico contributed some of the lyrics himself. The music video for the track is very low budget, showing Chico in front of a plain white background, with lines of red, yellow and orange, and a staircase where Chico stands at the beginning of the video. The video features many children, known as "Chiquettes", dancing along with Chico.

== "It's England Time" ==
In 2010, Slimani re-recorded the single in support of the England football team at the 2010 FIFA World Cup in South Africa. Aptly entitled "It's England Time", a play on "It's Chico Time", it uses the same basis as the original version, but with amended lyrics. The song was first played on The Chris Moyles Show.

Slimani recorded the version after having a 'vision' that England would win the 2010 World Cup, and that in the celebrations, commentators would make reference to his song. The single was released on 8 February 2010. Proceeds went to Rainbow Child Foundation to help under-privileged children in Africa.

== Track listings ==
=== "It's Chico Time" ===
- CD single
1. "It's Chico Time" – 2:49
2. "It's Chico Time" (The X Factor Live Show Version) – 2:28
3. "Kiss" – 3:18
4. "It's Chico Time" (video) – 3:00
- Digital download
1. "It's Chico Time" – 2:49
2. "It's Chico Time" (The X Factor Live Show Version) – 2:28
3. "It's Chico Time" (Chico Dub) – 4:58
4. "It's Chico Time" (The X Factor Extended Mix) – 3:48

=== "It's England Time" ===
- Digital download
1. "It's England Time" – 3:22
2. "It's England Time" (Instrumental) – 3:18

== Credits and personnel ==
- Chico Slimani – lead vocals
- Marcus Hutton – synth (on "Kiss")
- Archie Merrington – kazoo (on "It's Chico Time")

== Charts ==
=== Weekly charts ===
Weekly chart performance for "It's Chico Time"
Chart (2006)	Peak position
Europe (Eurochart Hot 100)	4
Ireland (IRMA)	3
Scottish Singles Sales (Official Charts)	1
UK Singles (Official Charts)	1

=== Year-end charts ===
Year-end chart performance for "It's Chico Time"
Chart (2006)	Position
UK Singles (OCC)	40
