= Sandi Thom discography =

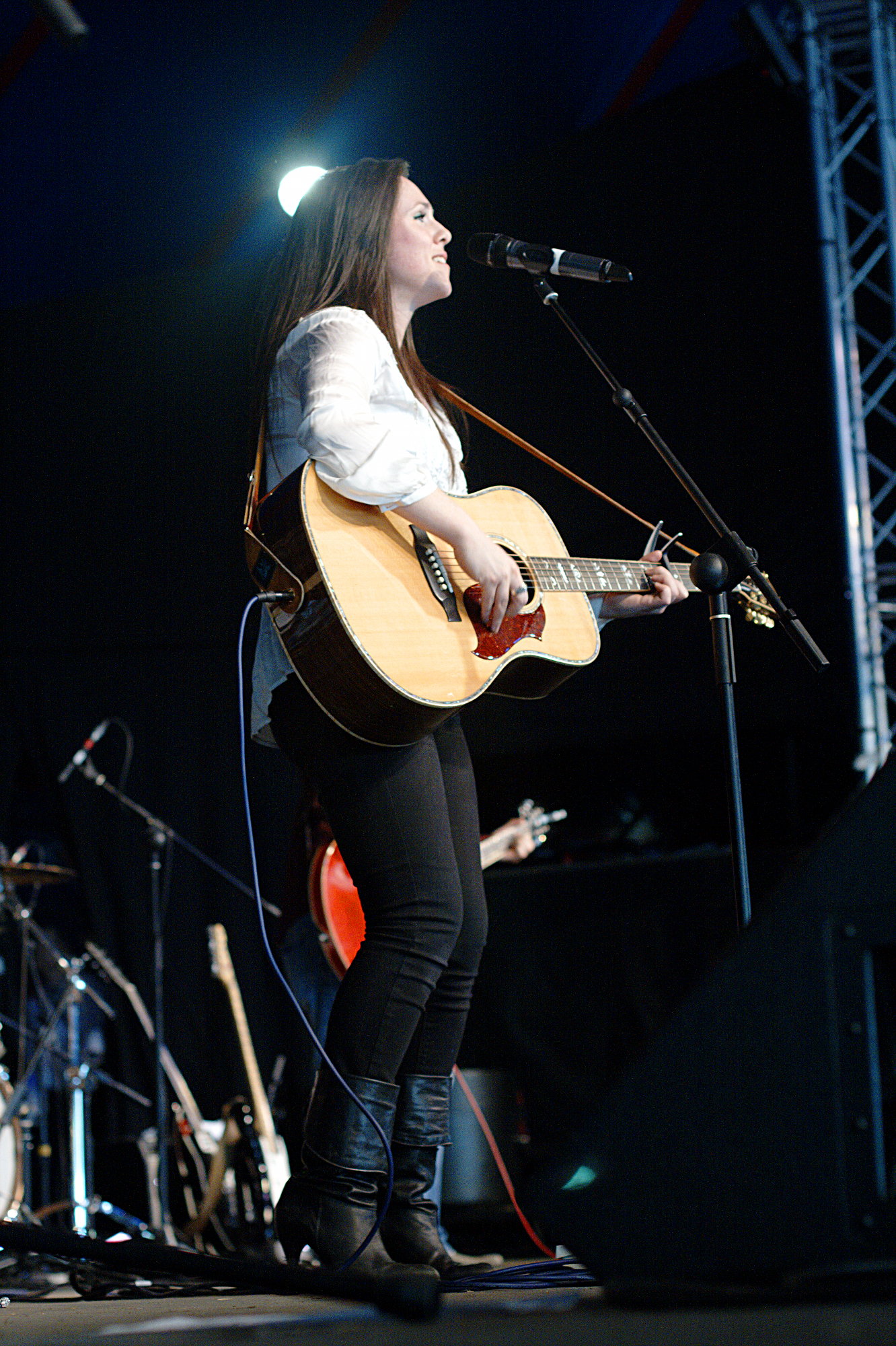
- Thom performing live at the Ealing Blues Festival in July 2011
- Studio albums: 5
- Live albums: 2
- Compilation albums: 1
- Singles: 21
- Music videos: 7
- Demo album: 1

The discography of Scottish singer-songwriter Sandi Thom includes six studio albums, twenty-one singles, one compilation album, two live albums and one demo album. Her debut album, Smile... It Confuses People, was released in June 2006, and spawned the internationally successful lead single "I Wish I Was a Punk Rocker (With Flowers in My Hair)". It eventually topped the singles charts in the United Kingdom, and finished as the 5th best selling single of 2006 in the United Kingdom. It topped the singles charts in her native Scotland, and in Australia, where it was eventually certified 2× Platinum by the Australian Recording Industry Association. In Sweden and the United Kingdom, the single was certified Gold status, indicating sales in excess of 10,000 and 400,000 copies respectively. The album reached number one in Ireland, Scotland and the United Kingdom, and the top twenty in both Australia and New Zealand.

In May 2008, she released "The Devil's Beat" as the lead single from her second album, The Pink & the Lily, which was subsequently released on 26 May 2008. The single failed the match the success experienced by her previous releases, peaking at number fifty-eight in the United Kingdom and eighty-eight in Germany. In many respects, the album also failed to match the success of her debut album, despite debuting at number eight in her native Scotland. It debuted at number twenty-five on the UK Albums Charts, spending only two weeks within the top 100.

Her third album, Merchants and Thieves (2010) debuted at number sixty-three on the albums charts in her native Scotland, and peaked at number three on the United Kingdom Jazz & Blues Albums Chart. Her follow up album, Flesh and Blood (2012), debuted at number twenty-seven on the UK Independent Albums Charts, whilst it debuted at number seventy-nine in Scotland. Her subsequent albums, Covers Collection (2013) and Ghosts (2019) failed to make any chart appearance. In 2009, she released her first compilation album, The Best of Sandi Thom, followed by a live album, Live Sessions, in 2010.

== Albums ==
=== Studio albums ===
Title	Details	Peak chart positions										Certifications (sales thresholds)
Title	Details	SCO	UK	AUS	FRA	GER	IRE	NLD	NZ	UK Ind	UK Jazz	Certifications (sales thresholds)
Smile... It Confuses People	Released: 5 June 2006; Label: RCA Music Group; Format: CD, digital download	1	1	11	43	42	1	75	5	—	—	BPI: Platinum; ARIA: Gold; SNEP: Gold; RIANZ: Gold
The Pink & the Lily	Released: 26 May 2008; Label: RCA Music Group, Sony BMG; Format: CD, digital download	8	25	—	163	—	72	—	—	—	—	
Merchants and Thieves	Released: 17 May 2010; Label: RCA Music Group; Format: CD, digital download	63	118	—	—	—	—	—	—	12	3	
Flesh and Blood	Released: 17 September 2012; Format: CD, digital download	79	152	—	—	—	—	—	—	27	—	
Covers Collection	Released: 11 November 2013; Format: CD, digital download	—	—	—	—	—	—	—	—	—	—	
Ghosts	Released: 7 January 2019; Format: CD, digital download	—	—	—	—	—	—	—	—	—		

=== Demo albums ===
Year	Title
2005	Rockabyeberry: Released: 2005

=== Compilation albums ===
Year	Title
2009	The Best of Sandi Thom: Released: 27 July 2009

=== Live albums ===
Year	Title
2009	Live: Released: 2009
2010	Live Sessions: Released: 2010

== Extended Plays ==
Year	Title
2024	Warpaint: Released: 2024; Format: Digital download, streaming

== Singles ==
Title	Year	Peak chart positions										Certifications (sales thresholds)	Album
Title	Year	SCO	AUS	AUT	FRA	GER	IRE	NZ	SWI	SWE	UK	Certifications (sales thresholds)	Album
"I Wish I Was a Punk Rocker (With Flowers in My Hair)"	2006	1	1	27	8	16	1	3	62	3	1	BPI: Gold; GLF: Gold; ARIA: 2× Platinum	Smile... It Confuses People
"What If I'm Right"	2006	8	36	—	—	—	30	35	—	—	22		Smile... It Confuses People
"Lonely Girl"	2006	—	—	—	—	—	—	—	—	—	—		Smile... It Confuses People
"The Devil's Beat"	2008	17	—	—	—	88	—	—	—	—	58		The Pink & the Lily
"Saturday Night"	2008	—	—	—	—	—	—	—	—	—			The Pink & the Lily
"This Ol' World" (featuring Joe Bonamassa)	2010	—	—	—	—	—	—	—	—	—	—		Merchants and Thieves
"Gold Dust"	2010	—	—	—	—	—	—	—	—	—	—		Merchants and Thieves
"House of the Rising Sun"	2010	—	—	—	—	—	—	—	—	—	—		Merchants and Thieves
"Maggie McCall"	2010	—	—	—	—	—	—	—	—	—	—		Merchants and Thieves
"Sun Comes Crashing Down"	2012	—	—	—	—	—	—	—	—	—	—		Flesh and Blood
"Big Ones Get Away" (with Buffy Sainte-Marie)	2012	—	—	—	—	—	—	—	—	—	—		Flesh and Blood
"Flesh and Blood"	2012	—	—	—	—	—	—	—	—	—	—		Flesh and Blood
"Love You Like a Lunatic"	2013	—	—	—	—	—	—	—	—	—	—		Flesh and Blood
"Earthquake"	2015	—	—	—	—	—	—	—	—	—	—		Non-album singles
"I Wish I Was a Punk Rocker" (Morlando Remix)	2016	—	—	—	—	—	—	—	—	—	—		Non-album singles
"Tightrope"	2017	—	—	—	—	—	—	—	—	—	—		Non-album singles
"Logan's Song"	2018	—	—	—	—	—	—	—	—	—	—		Non-album singles
"Ghosts" (solo or featuring Byron Gindra)	2018	—	—	—	—	—	—	—	—	—	—		Non-album singles
"World War 1"	2018	—	—	—	—	—	—	—	—	—	—		Non-album singles
"Punkrocker" (with DJ Harpoon)	2023	—	—	—	—	—	—	—	—	—	—		Non-album singles
"Silence"	2023	—	—	—	—	—	—	—	—	—	—		Warpaint
"Proud to Be from Scotland"	2026	—	—	—	—	—	—	—	—	—	—		
"—" denotes a recording that did not chart.
