= Friday (disambiguation) =

Friday is a day of the week.

Friday or Fridays may also refer to:

== People with the name ==
- Friday (given name) (includes a list of people with the name)
- Friday (surname) (includes a list of people with the name)
- Friday (Arapaho chief) (ca. 1822–1881) interpreter and negotiator during the Treaties of Fort Laramie in 1851 and 1868

== Arts, entertainment, and media ==
=== Fictional entities ===
- Friday (2000 AD), a character in the 2000 AD comics
- F.R.I.D.A.Y., a fictional artificial intelligence appearing in American comic books published by Marvel Comics.
- Friday (G.I. Joe), a fictional member of the Phoenix Guard in G.I. Joe: America's Elite
- Friday (Robinson Crusoe), a main character in Robinson Crusoe
- Friday, a canine character in the 2009 film Hotel for Dogs
- Friday Caliban, a character in A Series of Unfortunate Events
- Joe Friday, a fictional police detective in the television series Dragnet

=== Films ===
- Friday (1995 film), featuring rapper Ice Cube and comedian Chris Tucker
- Friday (2012 film), an Indian drama film
- Friday (2016 film), a Russian comedy film
- Friday (film series), a series of comedy films starring Ice Cube and John Witherspoon
- His Girl Friday, a 1940 American screwball comedy film
- Man Friday (film), a 1975 British/American film directed by Jack Gold
- Friday (2023 film), 2023 Bengali thriller film directed by Raihan Rafi

=== Literature ===
- Friday (novel), a novel by Robert A. Heinlein
- Friday, or, The Other Island, a novel by Michel Tournier
- Al-Jumua, 'Friday', the 62nd chapter (sura) of the Quran

=== Music ===
==== Full-length works ====
- Friday (album), by Christine Milton
- Friday (opera) or Freitag
- Friday (soundtrack), by Ice Cube

==== Songs ====
- "Friday" (Daniel Bedingfield song)
- "Friday" (Rebecca Black song)
- "Friday" (Riton and Nightcrawlers song) featuring Mufasa and Hypeman
- "Friday", by Bowling For Soup from Rock on Honorable Ones!!
- "Friday", by J.J. Cale from the album 5
- "Friday", by the Chainsmokers from the EP No Hard Feelings
- "Friday", by Goldspot
- "Friday", by Ice Cube from soundtrack of Friday
- "Friday", by IU from their album Modern Times
- "Friday", by Joe Jackson from his album I'm the Man
- "Friday", by Phish from Round Room
- "Friday", by Plies from The Real Testament
- "Friday", by Sunny Day Real Estate from Sunny Day Real Estate
- "Friday", by Suzi Quatro from Quatro
- "Friday", by Stefania

=== Periodicals ===
- Friday (magazine), a Japanese weekly photographic magazine

=== Television ===
- Friday: The Animated Series, a TV cartoon based on the film series
- Fridays (TV series), an American comedy show which aired from 1980 to 1982
- Fridays (Cartoon Network), a 2003–07 Cartoon Network programming block
- "Friday" (The One Game), a 1988 episode
- Friday!, a Russian television channel

== Idioms ==
- Man Friday, an especially faithful servant or one's best servant or right-hand man (inspired by the eponymous Robinson Crusoe character)

== Other uses ==
- HMS Friday, an urban legend about an ill-fated ship
- TGI Fridays, American restaurant chain

== See also ==
- Friday the 13th, a day considered unlucky
- Friday the 17th, a day considered unlucky in Italy
- Friday Bridge (band), a Swedish band
- Friday Bridge, Cambridgeshire, England
- Fryday (disambiguation)
- Friday the 13th (disambiguation)
- Girl Friday (disambiguation)

Sunday • Monday • Tuesday • Wednesday • Thursday • Friday • Saturday
