= Monday (disambiguation) =

Monday is a day of the week.

Monday may also refer to:

== Film and television ==
- "Monday" (The X-Files), a 1999 episode of the television series
- Monday (2000 film), a Japanese film
- Monday (2020 film), an American-British-Greek film
- "Monday" (The Cockfields), a 2021 TV episode
- "Monday" (The One Game), a 1988 TV episode
- Alien: Monday, a 2024 fan film

== Music ==
- Monday (opera) (German: Montag), an opera by Karlheinz Stockhausen from his Licht cycle
- "Monday" (Matt Corby song) (2016)
- "Monday" (Imagine Dragons song) (2021)
- "Monday", a song by The Jam from Sound Affects (1980)
- "Monday", a song by Orbital from Orbital (1993)
- "Monday", a song by Quadeca from Vanisher, Horizon Scraper (2025)
- "Monday", a song by Sonny & Cher from In Case You're in Love (1967)
- "Monday", a song by Wilco from Being There (1996)

== Places ==
- Monday, Missouri, an unincorporated community
- Monday, Ohio, an unincorporated community
- Monday Creek, a stream in Ohio
- Monday River, in Paraguay (unrelated etymology)
- Dushanbe, Tajikistan, which means Monday in Persian

== Companies ==
- monday.com, a SaaS company

== Other uses ==
- Monday (given name)
- Monday (surname)
- Monday Magazine, a weekly newspaper in Victoria, British Columbia, Canada
- Monday (play), a 2009 one-woman stage play by Gloria Idahota Williams
- Monday (software), task management software
- Miss Monday, a character from the 2014 video game Yaiba: Ninja Gaiden Z

== See also ==
- Monday Monday (disambiguation)

Sunday • Monday • Tuesday • Wednesday • Thursday • Friday • Saturday
