= Sunday News =

Sunday News may refer to the following newspapers:

- Sunday editions of newspapers
- Sunday News (Lancaster), Pennsylvania, United States
- Sunday News (New Zealand)
- Sunday News (Sydney)
- Sunday News (Tanzania)
- Sunday News (UK), the later name of Lloyd's Weekly Newspaper
- Sunday News (Daily News), New York, New York

== See also ==
- Sunday Edition (disambiguation)
- Sunday (disambiguation)
- News (disambiguation)
- Weekly (disambiguation)
