= Saturday (disambiguation) =

Saturday is a day of the week.

Saturday may also refer to:

== Film and television ==
- Saturday (film), a 1945 Czechoslovak film
- "Saturday" (Roseanne), a 1989 television episode
- "Saturday" (The One Game), a 1988 TV episode
- Saturdays (TV series), a 2023 Disney Channel series

== Literature ==
- Saturday (novel), 2005, by Ian McEwan
- The Saturdays (novel), 1941, by Elizabeth Enright

== Music ==
- Saturday (opera) (German: Samstag), by Karlheinz Stockhausen
- The Saturdays, a British-Irish girl group
- Saturday (group), a South Korean girl group

=== Albums ===
- Saturday (Ocean Colour Scene album), 2010
- Saturday (The Reivers album) or the title song, 1987

=== Songs ===
- "Saturday" (Basshunter song), 2010
- "Saturday" (The Enemy song), 2012
- "Saturday" (Fall Out Boy song), 2003
- "Saturday" (Rebecca Black and Dave Days song), 2013
- "Saturday" (Twenty One Pilots song), 2021
- "Saturday" (Yo La Tengo song), 2000
- "Saturday (Oooh! Ooooh!)", by Ludacris, 2002
- "Saturday", by Baboon from their 2006 self-titled album
- "Saturday", by Babyface from For the Cool in You, 1993
- "Saturday", by Built to Spill from You in Reverse, 2006
- "Saturday", by the Carpenters from Carpenters, 1971
- "Saturday", by Childish Gambino and Deni's Band from the soundtrack of the film Guava Island, 2019
- "Saturday", by Christie Front Drive from Christie Front Drive, 1997
- "Saturday", by the Clientele from Suburban Light, 2000
- "Saturday", by Hedley from Hedley, 2005
- "Saturday", by the Judybats from Down in the Shacks Where the Satellite Dishes Grow, 1992
- "Saturday", by Kids in Glass Houses from Smart Casual, 2008
- "Saturday", by Liberty X from Thinking It Over, 2002
- "Saturday", by Marc Broussard from Carencro, 2004
- "Saturday", by Nathan Willett from the soundtrack of the film Captain Underpants: The First Epic Movie, 2017
- "Saturday", by Norma Jean Wright from Norma Jean, 1978
- "Saturday", by Per Gessle from The World According to Gessle, 1997
- "Saturday", by the Rocket Summer from Calendar Days, 2003
- "Saturday", by Sam Fender from Hypersonic Missiles, 2019
- "Saturday", by Simple Plan, 2015
- "Saturday", by Smile Empty Soul from Anxiety, 2005
- "Saturday", by Sparklehorse from Vivadixiesubmarinetransmissionplot, 1995
- "Saturday", by White Reaper from You Deserve Love, 2019
- "Saturday (Do I Care)", by Jack Lucien from EuroSceptic, 2009
- "Saturdays", by Chevelle from Vena Sera, 2007
- "Saturdays", by Louis Tomlinson from Faith in the Future, 2022
- "Saturdays", by Nelly Furtado featuring Jarvis Church from Folklore, 2003
- "Saturdays", by Twin Shadow from Caer, 2018

== People ==
- Jeff Saturday (born 1975), American football player
- Windradyne or Saturday (c. 1800–1829), Australian Aboriginal warrior and resistance leader

== See also ==
- "A Roller Skating Jam Named "Saturdays"", a song by De La Soul
- Saturday morning (disambiguation)
- Saturday Night (disambiguation)

Sunday • Monday • Tuesday • Wednesday • Thursday • Friday • Saturday
