= Saturday Night =

Saturday Night may refer to:

== Film, television and theatre ==
=== Film ===
- Saturday Night (1922 film), a 1922 film directed by Cecil B. DeMille
- Saturday Nights (film), a 1933 Swedish film directed by Schamyl Bauman
- Saturday Night (1950 film), a Spanish film directed by Rafael Gil
- Saturday Night (1957 film), a Yugoslav film directed by Vladimir Pogačić
- Saturday Night, a 1975 short film based on Sondheim's musical and directed by James Benning
- Saturday Night (2000 film), an Australian film starring Alison Whyte
- Saturday Night (2010 film), an American documentary about the television series Saturday Night Live
- Saturday Night (2022 film), a Malayalam-language comedy-drama
- Saturday Night (2024 film) An American comedy-drama film about the production of the first episode of the television series Saturday Night Live

=== Television ===
- Saturday Night Live, an American sketch-comedy show originally called NBC's Saturday Night
- Saturday Night (BBC comedy series), 1972, starring James Young
- Saturday Night Rove, an Australian variety series hosted by Rove McManus
- Saturday Night, a pre-game program that precedes Hockey Night in Canada
- WCW Saturday Night, an American wrestling program

=== Theatre ===
- Saturday Night (musical), by Stephen Sondheim, 1955

== Literature ==
- Saturday Night (book), by Susan Orlean, 1990
- Saturday Night (magazine), a Canadian magazine
- Saturday Night Magazine (U.S.), a lifestyle magazine
- Ireland's Saturday Night, an Irish sports newspaper

== Music ==
=== Albums ===
- Saturday Night (The Bear Quartet album), 2005
- Saturday Night (Zhané album) or the title song, 1997
- Saturday Night! – The Album, by Schoolly D, or the title song, 1986
- Saturday Night, by Black Lace, 1995

=== Songs ===
- "Saturday Night" (Aaron Carter song), 2005
- "Saturday Night" (Bay City Rollers song), 1973
- "Saturday Night" (The Blue Nile song), 1989
- "Saturday Night" (Cold Chisel song), 1984
- "Saturday Night" (Drowning Pool song), 2012
- "Saturday Night" (Glen Adams Affair song), 1984
- "Saturday Night" (Jessica Mauboy song), 2010
- "Saturday Night" (Natalia Kills song), 2013
- "Saturday Night" (Sandi Thom song), 2008
- "Saturday Night" (Sqeezer song), 1997
- "Saturday Night" (Suede song), 1997
- "Saturday Night" (The Underdog Project song), 2002
- "Saturday Night" (Whigfield song), 1992
- "Saturday Night (Is the Loneliest Night of the Week)", written by Jule Styne and Sammy Cahn, 1944; popularized by Frank Sinatra, 1945
- "Saturday Nite", by Earth, Wind & Fire, 1976
- "Say Amen (Saturday Night)", by Panic! at the Disco, 2018
- "Saturday Nights" (Khalid song), 2018
- "Saturday Night", by 2 Chainz from Pretty Girls Like Trap Music, 2017
- "Saturday Night", by the Cat Empire from Stolen Diamonds, 2019
- "Saturday Night", by the Commodores from In the Pocket, 1981
- "Saturday Night", by Crayon Pop, 2012
- "Saturday Night", by Daniel Lindström, 2008
- "Saturday Night", by the Eagles from Desperado, 1973
- "Saturday Night", by Herman Brood & His Wild Romance from Shpritsz, 1978
- "Saturday Night", by Herbie Hancock from Monster, 1980
- "Saturday Night", by Kaiser Chiefs from Employment, 2005
- "Saturday Night", by Key from Bad Love, 2021
- "Saturday Night", by Lonestar from Lonely Grill, 1999
- "Saturday Night", by Misfits from Famous Monsters, 1999
- "Saturday Night", by the New Christy Minstrels, 1963
- "Saturday Night", by Noisettes from Wild Young Hearts, 2009
- "Saturday Night", by the Odds, released by Red Rhino Records
- "Saturday Night", by Ozomatli from Street Signs, 2004
- "Saturday Night", by the Thrills from Let's Bottle Bohemia, 2004
- "Saturday Night", by Toni Braxton from Spell My Name, 2020
- "Saturday Night", by U2, rewritten and retitled "Fire", 1981

== Other uses ==
- Motza'ei Shabbat, the time in the evening immediately following Shabbat, that is Saturday night

== See also ==
- One More Saturday Night (disambiguation)
- Saturday (disambiguation)
- Saturday Night and Sunday Morning (disambiguation)
- Saturday Night Live (disambiguation)
- Saturday Knight, a South African rugby and cricket player
- Saturday Night Fever, a 1977 American film
- "It's Saturday Night", a song by The Proclaimers from Sunshine on Leith
