= You Can Have It All =

You Can Have It All may refer to:

- "You Can Have It All" (Kaiser Chiefs song)
- "You Can Have It All" (George McCrae song)
- "You Can Have It All", a song by Florence and the Machine from their 2025 album Everybody Scream

== See also ==
- "You Can't Have It All", a song by Ash
