= Fryday (disambiguation) =

Fryday is a social and business networking club for professionals.

Fryday may also refer to:

- FryDay, a 2018 Indian dramedy film
- Bob Fryday (1928–2007), Canadian ice hockey player
- Nichola Fryday (born 1995), Irish rugby player
- Robin Fryday, one of the producers of The Barber of Birmingham, a 2011 American documentary

== See also ==
- Friday (disambiguation)
- Operation Fryday, a 2023 Indian Hindi-language film by Vishram Sawant, starring Sunil Shetty and Randeep Hooda
