= Sunday (disambiguation) =

Sunday is a day of the week.

Sunday or Sundays may also refer to:

== Film and television ==
- Sunday (1915 film), an American silent film directed by George W. Lederer
- Sunday (1969 film), a Yugoslav film by Lordan Zafranović
- Sunday (1997 film), an indie film by Jonathan Nossiter
- Sunday (2002 film), a TV film about the 1972 "Bloody Sunday" shootings in Derry, Northern Ireland
- Sunday (2008 film), a Bollywood film
- Sunday (2011 film) or Dimanche, a Canadian animated short by Patrick Doyon
- Sunday (2023 film), a Singaporean drama film by Sean Ng
- Sundays (film) (Los Domingos), a 2025 Spanish film
- Sunday (Australian TV program), a 1981–2008 news and current affairs programme
- Sunday (New Zealand TV programme), a current affairs programme
- "Sunday" (Desperate Housewives), a 2008 TV episode
- "Sunday" (The One Game), a 1988 TV episode
- "Sunday" (Stargate Atlantis), a 2007 TV episode

== Music ==
- The Sundays, a 1988–1997 British rock band
- Sunday (opera) (Sonntag aus Licht), an opera in the Licht cycle by Karlheinz Stockhausen
- Sunday (singer) (born 1987), South Korean pop singer
- Sunday (The Gospel According to Iso), an album by Vika and Linda, 2020

=== Songs ===
- "Sunday" (jazz standard), written by Chester Conn and Benny Krueger, 1926
- "Sunday" (Foals song), 2019
- "Sunday" (Hurts song), 2011
- "Sunday" (Jessica Mauboy song), 2019
- "Sunday" (Lo-Pro song), 2003
- "Sunday" (Schiller song), 2010
- "Sunday" (Sonic Youth song), 1998
- "Sunday (The Day Before My Birthday)", by Moby, 2003
- "Sunday", by Ben Rector from The Joy of Music, 2022
- "Sunday", by Bloc Party from A Weekend in the City, 2007
- "Sunday", by the Cranberries from Everybody Else Is Doing It, So Why Can't We?, 1993
- "Sunday", by David Bowie from Heathen, 2002
- "Sunday", by Dermot Kennedy, 2023
- "Sunday", by Lee Ann Womack from The Lonely, the Lonesome & the Gone, 2017
- "Sunday", by the Lemonheads from Creator, 1988
- "Sunday", by Moka Only from Flood, 2002
- "Sunday", by Sia from Colour the Small One, 2004
- "Sunday", by the View from Bread and Circuses, 2011

== Other uses ==
- Sunday (name)
- Sunday (computer virus)
- The Sunday, Las Vegas magazine
- Sunday (magazine), flagship publication of the Lord's Day Association
- Sunday (radio programme), a UK religious affairs programme
- Sunday Communications, a parent company of SUNDAY, a mobile communication operator in Hong Kong
- Sunday (Honkai: Star Rail), a video game character
- Sundays (restaurant), in Uxbridge, Ontario, Canada

== See also ==
- Sundae, an ice cream dessert
- The Sun Days, Swedish pop band
- Sun Day, U.S. solar power advocacy day
- Day of the Sun, North Korean public holiday
- Bloody Sunday (disambiguation)
- Sunday Bloody Sunday (disambiguation)
- Sunday Morning (disambiguation)
- Sunday Edition (disambiguation)

Sunday • Monday • Tuesday • Wednesday • Thursday • Friday • Saturday
