= Monday Monday (disambiguation) =

Monday Monday is an ITV, UTV comedy drama.

Monday Monday may also refer to:

- Monday, Monday (album), by Paul Horn
- "Monday, Monday", by The Mamas & The Papas

== See also ==
- Monday (disambiguation)
