= One More Saturday Night =

One More Saturday Night may refer to:

- "One More Saturday Night" (song), a song by the Grateful Dead
- One More Saturday Night (film), a comedy written by and starring Al Franken and Tom Davis
- One More Saturday Night (The Halluci Nation album), 2021
- One More Saturday Night, an album by Sha Na Na
- "One More Saturday Night", a song by Nils Lofgren from Nils Lofgren
- "One More Saturday Night", a single by Maureen Steele
- One More Saturday Night, a satellite radio show hosted by Bill Walton

== See also ==
- "Another Saturday Night", a song by Sam Cooke
- Saturday Night (disambiguation)
