= Saturday Morning =

Saturday Morning may refer to:

- Saturday Morning (album), an album by Sonny Criss
- Saturday Morning (1922 film), an Our Gang comedy
- Saturday Morning (2007 film)
- Saturday Morning: Cartoons' Greatest Hits, a tribute album produced by Ralph Sall
- "Saturday Morning", a song by Eels from Shootenanny!
- "Saturday Morning", an instrumental song by Raffi from his Everything Grows album

== See also ==
- Saturday-morning cartoon, programming on American television networks.
- Saturday Morning Watchmen, a 2009 viral video
- Saturday AM (magazine), a manga magazine
- Saturday (disambiguation)
- CBS Saturday Morning
