= Wednesday (disambiguation) =

Wednesday is a day of the week.

Wednesday may also refer to:

== Film and television ==
- Wednesday, a 2007 UK short film by Rob Sorrenti
- A Wednesday!, a 2008 Hindi film
- Wednesday (TV series), a 2022 show based on the Addams Family
- "Wednesday" (The Cockfields), a 2021 television episode

== Music ==
- Wednesday (Canadian band), a Canadian pop group active 1971–1981
- Wednesday (American band), formed 2017 in Asheville, North Carolina
- Wednesday (album), a 1999 album by King Creosote
- Wednesdays (album), a 2020 album by Ryan Adams
- "Wednesday", a song by Tori Amos from her 2002 album Scarlet's Walk

== Other uses ==
- Wednesday (given name)
- Sheffield Wednesday F.C., an English football club
- Wednesday Addams, a member of the fictional Addams Family
- Wednesday Island, Wilhelm Archipelago, Antarctica
- Wednesday Martin, American author and cultural critic
- Mr. Wednesday, a personification of Odin in the novel American Gods

== See also ==
Sunday • Monday • Tuesday • Wednesday • Thursday • Friday • Saturday
