= And Then Nothing Turned Itself Inside-Out =

Studio album by Yo La Tengo
- Released: February 22, 2000
- Recorded: 1999 in Nashville, Tennessee
- Genres: Indie rock; dream pop
- Length: 77:36
- Label: Matador
- Producer: Roger Moutenot

Yo La Tengo chronology
I Can Hear the Heart Beating as One (1997)	And Then Nothing Turned Itself Inside-Out (2000)	The Sounds of the Sounds of Science (2002)

Singles from And Then Nothing Turned Itself Inside-Out
- 1. "You Can Have It All" Released: May 25, 1999; 2. "Saturday" Released: January 31, 2000

And Then Nothing Turned Itself Inside-Out is the ninth studio album by American indie rock band Yo La Tengo, released on February 22, 2000, by Matador Records. The album received acclaim from critics.

== Recording and release ==
And Then Nothing Turned Itself Inside-Out was recorded at Alex the Great in Nashville, Tennessee, and mixed at the Big House in Manhattan, New York City. The album was produced by Roger Moutenot and released on February 22, 2000, by Matador Records. The title of the album is likely derived from a quote by musician Sun Ra, a noted influence on the band: "...At first there was nothing...then nothing turned itself inside-out and became something".

The album's artwork is by Gregory Crewdson.

The album reached number 138 on the Billboard 200 in the United States, their first to do so. As of January 2003, the album had sold 114,000 copies in the US, according to Nielsen SoundScan.

== Music and lyrics ==
And Then Nothing Turned Itself Inside-Out has been described by Philip Sherburne of Pitchfork as "the quietest, coziest album of [Yo La Tengo's] career, one suffused in lullaby-like close harmonies and cotton-candy 1960s flashbacks." The album marks a creative shift in Yo La Tengo's songwriting with a greatly slower approach. The band continued to expand on their simple songwriting. Many songs on the album are soft ballads with very airy percussion and background noises.

The guitars and bass provide a strong undertone of reverberation. The album also features an array of backing instruments such as vibraphone and drum machines, which all lend an expansion of musical textures and differentiation of timbre.

Yo La Tengo deliver more subdued art pop songs on this album than on any other. However, their noise rock influence is also most present in songs like "Saturday", "Cherry Chapstick", "Tired Hippo", and the 17-minute epic "Night Falls on Hoboken". The title "Let's Save Tony Orlando's House" comes from an episode of The Simpsons, titled "Marge on the Lam". It is the name of a telethon that actor Troy McClure previously hosted. During this period, many of their tracks were given temp-titles based on McClure's filmography.

"Everyday" incorporates slide guitar.

The song "The Crying of Lot G" is a reference to Thomas Pynchon's novel The Crying of Lot 49. "You Can Have It All" is a cover of the George McCrae song, originally written by Harry Wayne Casey of KC and the Sunshine Band. Yo La Tengo's take is of a distinctly different style, with a much slower tempo. A techno version of "You Can Have It All" was used as Northwest Airlines's theme song under the Now You're Flying Smart slogan. The track "Our Way to Fall" appears in an episode of Six Feet Under titled "Driving Mr. Mossback" (season 2, episode 4).

== Critical reception ==
Professional ratings
Aggregate scores
Source	Rating
Metacritic	83/100
Review scores
Source	Rating
AllMusic	4/5 stars
Entertainment Weekly	A
The Guardian	4/5 stars
Melody Maker	4/5 stars
NME	9/10
Pitchfork	8.1/10
Q	4/5 stars
Rolling Stone	4/5 stars
Spin	8/10
The Village Voice	B+

And Then Nothing Turned Itself Inside-Out received acclaim from music critics. AllMusic reviewer Heather Phares felt that the album "isn't as immediate as some of the group's earlier work, but it's just as enduring, proving that Yo La Tengo is the perfect band to grow old with". The album appeared at number 8 in The Village Voice's Pazz & Jop critics' poll for 2000.

In 2009, Pitchfork ranked the album at number 37 on its list of The Top 200 Albums of the 2000s. Similarly, the album was ranked at number 77 in Rolling Stone's list of 100 Best Albums of the 2000s. In 2020, the album was ranked at number 48 in PopMatters' list of the 100 Best Albums of the 2000s. In 2018, Pitchfork ranked it fifth on its list of "The 30 Best Dream Pop Albums". In 2019, the album was ranked 82nd on the Guardian's 100 Best Albums of the 21st Century list. In 2017, Treble ranked the album at thirteenth in their "Top 100 Indie Rock albums of the '00s".

== Track listing ==
All tracks are written by Yo La Tengo unless otherwise noted.

No.	Title	Writer(s)	Vocals	Length
1.	"Everyday"		Hubley, McNew	6:32
2.	"Our Way to Fall"		Kaplan	4:18
3.	"Saturday"		Hubley, Kaplan	4:18
4.	"Let's Save Tony Orlando's House"		Hubley	4:59
5.	"Last Days of Disco"		Kaplan	6:28
6.	"The Crying of Lot G"		Kaplan	4:45
7.	"You Can Have It All"	Harry Wayne Casey, Richard Finch	Hubley	4:37
8.	"Tears Are in Your Eyes"		Hubley	4:35
9.	"Cherry Chapstick"		Kaplan	6:12
10.	"From Black to Blue"		Kaplan	4:47
11.	"Madeline"		Hubley	3:37
12.	"Tired Hippo"			4:46
13.	"Night Falls on Hoboken"		Kaplan	17:42

== Personnel ==
Credits are adapted from the album's liner notes.

Yo La Tengo

- Georgia Hubley
- Ira Kaplan
- James McNew

Additional musicians

- Susie Ibarra – percussion (tracks 1, 3)
- Kris Gillespie – drum programming (track 4)
- David Henry – cello (track 7)
- Tim Harris – cello (track 10)

Production

- Roger Moutenot – producer
- David Henry – additional recording in Nashville
- Bil Emmons – additional recording in Manhattan
- Peter Walsh – additional recording on location in Brooklyn
- Wayne Dorell – additional recording at the Pigeon Club in Hoboken
- Greg Calbi – mastering
- Gregory Crewdson – photography
- Dan – photography

== Charts ==
Chart performance for And Then Nothing Turned Itself Inside-Out
Chart (2000)	Peak position
Norwegian Albums (VG-lista)	17
Scottish Albums (Official Charts)	76
UK Albums (Official Charts)	79
UK Independent Albums (Official Charts)	15
US Billboard 200	138
US Independent Albums (Billboard)	8
