= The Devil's Beat =

Single by Sandi Thom

from the album The Pink & The Lily
- B-side: "The Devil's Beat" (Live)
- Released: 19 May 2008 (UK)
- Recorded: 2008
- Genre: Folk pop
- Length: 2:23
- Songwriters: Sandi Thom, Jake Field, Duncan Thomson

Sandi Thom singles chronology
"Lonely Girl" (2006)	"The Devil's Beat" (2008)	"Saturday Night" (2008)

"The Devil's Beat" is a Folk-pop song taken from Sandi Thom's second album, The Pink & The Lily. It was the first single taken from the album and marked Thom's return after almost two years. Despite some promotion on TV and heavy rotation on BBC Radio 2, it only charted briefly, reaching #58 in the UK before leaving the charts. However, it achieved moderate commercial success in her native Scotland, debuting at number 17 on the singles charts.

== Track listings ==
UK CD Single

1. The Devil's Beat
2. The Devil's Beat (Live)

German Maxi CD

1. The Devil's Beat
2. The Devil's Beat (Live)
3. The Ghost of Stevie Ray
4. The Devil's Beat (Video)

== Chart performance ==
Chart (2008)	Peak position
Scotland Singles (OCC)	17
Germany (GfK)	88
UK Singles (OCC)	58
