= Thursday (disambiguation) =

Thursday is a day of the week.

Thursday may also refer to:

== Film and television ==
- Thursday (film), a 1998 film directed by Skip Woods
- A Thursday, a 2022 Indian film directed by Behzad Khambata
- "Thursday" (13 Reasons Why), a 2020 TV episode
- "Thursday" (The Cockfields), a 2021 TV episode
- "Thursday" (Queer as Folk), a 1999 TV episode

== Fictional characters ==
- Ruby Thursday, a fictional character in the Marvel Comics Universe
- Thursday Next, a fictional character in novels by Jasper Fforde
- Fred Thursday, a fictional character in the television series Endeavor
- Thursday, a fictional mouse in four books by Michael Bond
- Thursday Ramsbottom, a fictional Canadian ram in Marathon (2028)

== Music ==
- Thursday (band), an American post-hardcore band
- Thursday (opera) (German: Donnerstag), an opera by Karlheinz Stockhausen from his Licht cycle

=== Albums ===
- Thursday (album), mixtape or title track by the Weeknd

=== Songs ===
- "Thursday", a song from the musical revue Blackbirds of 1939 written by Haber and Sachs
- "Thursday" (Pet Shop Boys song), a song by the Pet Shop Boys
- "Thursday", a song by Morphine from Cure for Pain and also used in the soundtrack to the film Beavis and Butt-head
- "Thursday", a song by Country Joe and the Fish from I-Feel-Like-I'm-Fixin'-to-Die, 1967
- "Thursday", a song by Jim Croce from I Got a Name, 1973
- "Thursday", a song by The Puddle, 1993
- "Thursday", single by The Features, 2000
- "Thursday" (Jess Glynne song), 2018
- "Thursday", a song by Holly Humberstone from The Walls Are Way Too Thin, 2021

== Other uses ==
- Thursday October Christian I (1790–1831), first son of Fletcher Christian (leader of the historical mutiny on HMS Bounty)
- Thursday, West Virginia, a community in the United States
- Abergavenny Thursdays F.C., a Welsh football club
- Thursday Island, Queensland, Australia

== See also ==
Sunday • Monday • Tuesday • Wednesday • Thursday • Friday • Saturday
