= Tuesday (disambiguation) =

Tuesday is a day of the week.

Tuesday may also refer to:

== Films ==
- Tuesday (2008 film), a British crime film featuring a bank heist in the 1980s
- Tuesday (2023 film), an English-language drama-fantasy film starring Julia Louis-Dreyfus

== Music ==
- Tuesday (band), an American pop-punk/emo band

=== Albums ===
- Tuesday (album), by Reamonn

=== Songs ===
- "Tuesday" (ILoveMakonnen song), featuring Drake (2014)
- "Tuesday" (Trey Anastasio song) (2005)
- "Tuesday" (You Am I song) (1997)
- "Tuesday", by Avail from 4am Friday (1996)
- "Tuesday", by Five for Fighting from Slice (2010)
- "Tuesday", by Télépopmusik from Angel Milk (2005)
- "Tuesday", by Yazoo from Upstairs at Eric's (1982)
- "Tuesday", by Psychostick from Do (2018)

== People ==
- Tuesday Knight (born 1969), an American actress born Melody Lynn Knight
- Tuesday Middaugh (born 1973), an American former synchronized swimmer
- Tuesday Weld (born 1943), an American actress born Susan Ker Weld
- Gayle Tuesday, a pseudonym of Brenda Gilhooly (born 1964), an English comedian
- Tuesday Vargas (born 1979), Filipina actress, comedian, and singer

== Other uses ==
- Tuesday (book), a 1991 children's picture book by David Wiesner
- Tuesday (horse), a Thoroughbred racehorse foaled in 2019
- Tuesday X, a character in the American animated television series The X's (2005-2006)

== See also ==
Sunday • Monday • Tuesday • Wednesday • Thursday • Friday • Saturday
