= Saturday Night and Sunday Morning (disambiguation) =

Saturday Night and Sunday Morning is a 1958 novel by Alan Sillitoe.

Saturday Night and Sunday Morning or similar may also refer to:

== Film and television ==
- Saturday Night and Sunday Morning (film), a 1960 film adaptation of Sillitoe's novel
- "Saturday Night and Sunday Morning", a 1991 episode of 2point4 Children
- "Saturday Night and Sunday Morning", a 2004 episode of Ghost in the Shell: Stand Alone Complex

== Music ==
- Saturday Nights & Sunday Mornings, a 2008 album by Counting Crows
- Saturday Night, Sunday Morning, a 1993 live album by The Stranglers
- Saturday Night, Sunday Morning (Jake Bugg album), 2021
- Saturday Night Sunday Morning, a 1989 album by The River Detectives
- Saturday Night Sunday Morning, a 2015 album by Chelsea
- Saturday Night – Sunday Morning, a 1988 album by Lonesome River Band
- Saturday Night/Sunday Morning, a 2014 album by Marty Stuart
- Saturday Night, Sunday Morning, a 1983 album by The Viletones
- Saturday Night, Sunday Morning, a 2004 EP by Starky
- "Saturday Night, Sunday Morning", a 1979 song by Thelma Houston
- "Saturday Night Sunday Morning", a song by Madness on the 1999 album Wonderful
- "Saturday Night and Sunday Morning", an instrumental track on Phil Collins' 1989 album ...But Seriously

== Other uses ==
- Saturday Night, Sunday Morning, a 1999 drama by Archie Weller
- "Saturday Night, Sunday Morning", a track on the 1962 comedy album The First Family by Vaughn Meader
- Saturday Night Sunday Morning Records, a record label of Six by Seven

== See also ==
- Saturday Night (disambiguation)
