= The Sunday Times (disambiguation) =

The Sunday Times is a British Sunday newspaper.

It may also refer to:

- The Sunday Times Magazine, a magazine included with The Sunday Times
- Sunday Times of Ceylon, a defunct Ceylonese newspaper
- The Sunday Times (India)
- The Sunday Times (Malta)
- The Sunday Times (South Africa)
- The Straits Times, which has The Sunday Times as one of its former names
- The Sunday Times (Sri Lanka)
- The Sunday Times (Sydney)
- The Sunday Times (Western Australia)
- The Sunday Times, the Sunday edition of The New York Times
- The Sunday Times, the Sunday edition of The New Times (Rwanda)
- The Sunday Times, the Sunday edition of The Scranton Times-Tribune
- The New Sunday Times, the Sunday edition of the New Straits Times

== See also ==
- Sunday Times-Star
- Sunday Star-Times
- Sunday Edition (disambiguation)
- The Times (disambiguation)
