= Sunday Edition =

Sunday Edition may refer to:

- Sunday Edition (Australian TV program), an Australian morning news television program that debuted on Sky News Live in 2016
- Sunday Edition (Canadian TV series), a 1988–1999 Canadian news and public affairs television program
- The Sunday Edition, a 2006–2007 British political interview and discussion television programme
- The Sunday Edition (CBC Radio), a Canadian news and information radio show
- Sunday editions, weekly newspapers published on Sunday
- Sunday comics, weekly special comics printings in newspapers

== See also ==
- The Sunday Times (disambiguation)
- Sunday (disambiguation)
