= Sunday Morning =

Sunday Morning or Sunday Mornin' may refer to:

== Art ==
- Sunday Morning (poem), a poem by Wallace Stevens
- Sunday Morning (collage), a public artwork by India Cruse-Griffin, in Indianapolis, Indiana, US

== Music ==
=== Albums ===
- Sunday Morning (album), a 2002 album by Jake Shimabukuro
- Sunday Mornin' (album), a 1961 album by Grant Green, or its title song (see below)

=== Songs ===
- "Sunday Morning" (Earth, Wind & Fire song), 1993
- "Sunday Morning" (Mitch James song), 2019
- "Sunday Morning" (k-os song), 2006
- "Sunday Morning" (Maroon 5 song), 2004
- "Sunday Morning" (No Doubt song), 1997
- "Sunday Morning" (The Velvet Underground song), 1967
- "Sunday Mornin'" (Spanky and Our Gang song), 1966
- "Sunday Mornin'", by Grant Green from the album Sunday Mornin'
- "Sunday Morning", by the Bolshoi, 1986
- "Sunday Morning", by Julian Lennon from his 1989 album Mr. Jordan
- "Sunday Morning", by Ani DiFranco from her 2005 album Knuckle Down
- "Sunday Morning", from the musical Natasha, Pierre & the Great Comet of 1812
- "Sunday Morning" (日曜の朝), by Hikaru Utada from the 2006 album Ultra Blue
- "Sunday Mornin", by Mary Mary from her 2011 album Go Get It
- "Sunday Morning", by Matoma feat. Josie Dunne, from the 2018 album One in a Million
- "Sunday Morning", by Ethel Cain, 2019
- "Sunday Morning", by Illit, 2026

== Radio and television ==
- Sunday Morning (radio program), a Canadian radio program formerly aired on CBC Radio One
- CBS News Sunday Morning, a television news program on CBS in the United States
- Sunday Morning, a Japanese television news program on TBS
- Sunday Morning, a UK television current affairs programme on BBC One
- Sunday Morning with Trevor Phillips, a UK television political programme on Sky News

== See also ==
- One Sunday Morning, a 1926 film directed by Fatty Arbuckle
