= You Can Have It All (George McCrae song) =

1974 single by George McCrae

Single by George McCrae

from the album Rock Your Baby
- B-side: "Make It Right"
- Released: 1974
- Genre: Disco
- Length: 2:40
- Label: Jay Boy
- Songwriter(s): Harry Wayne Casey; Richard Finch
- Producer(s): Harry Wayne Casey; Richard Finch

George McCrae singles chronology
"I Can't Leave You Alone" (1974)	"You Can Have It All" (1974)	"I Get Lifted" (1975)

"You Can Have It All" is a song by American singer George McCrae. It was written by Harry Wayne Casey and Richard Finch and released as a single in 1974, reaching number 23 on the UK Singles Chart.

The song was notably covered by American indie rock band Yo La Tengo and released as a single from their 2000 album And Then Nothing Turned Itself Inside-Out.

== Yo La Tengo cover ==
"You Can Have It All"

Single by Yo La Tengo

from the album And Then Nothing Turned Itself Inside-Out
- B-side: "Ready-Mades"
- Released: 2000
- Genre: Indie rock; indie pop
- Length: 4:37
- Label: Matador
- Songwriter(s): Harry Wayne Casey; Richard Finch
- Producer(s): Roger Moutenot

Yo La Tengo singles chronology
"Run Run Run" (1998)	"You Can Have It All" (2000)	"Saturday" (2000)

The song was covered by Yo La Tengo for their 2000 album And Then Nothing Turned Itself Inside-Out, and was released as a single, charting at number 87 on the UK Singles Chart. The artwork for the single featured a photograph of comedian Amy Poehler.

Reviewing the single, AllMusic wrote: "Yo La Tengo rework the song so thoroughly that it sounds like an original. [...] as a stylistic choice, it works beautifully, not least because when David Henry's cello line comes in towards the song's end, its unexpected beauty is all the sweeter because of the genial goofiness of the rest of the arrangement."
