= HMS Friday =

Urban myth about a Royal Navy ship

HMS Friday is an urban myth concerning a disastrous attempt by the Royal Navy to dispel the superstition against sailing on a Friday. While widely circulated, the story is in fact untrue; moreover, there was never even a ship named HMS Friday.

The details of the story vary, but it usually follows this form:

Sometime in the 19th century, the Royal Navy attempted to finally dispel the old superstition among sailors that beginning a voyage on a Friday was certain to bring bad luck. To demonstrate the falseness of this belief, they decided to commission a ship named HMS Friday. Her keel was laid on a Friday, she was launched on a Friday, and she set sail on her maiden voyage on Friday the 13th, under the command of a Captain James Friday. She was never seen or heard from again.

This story, in numerous variations, is frequently recounted, often as fact. It also appeared as a small "filler" item in the magazine Reader's Digest, its format giving the impression of having been historically researched.

In fact, there has never been any Royal Navy ship of that name. It is unclear where the story originated; however, it seems to have gained in popularity after its recounting by comedian Dave Allen on his BBC television show Dave Allen at Large, Series 1, Episode 2, first broadcast 4 February 1971. It also was retold in detail in the 1983 book Destiny by Paul Aurandt Jr., the son of Paul Harvey as part of the elder Harvey's The Rest of the Story book series.
