= Monday (given name) =

Monday is a given name. Notable people with the name include:

- Monday Eguabor (born 1968), Nigerian wrestler
- Monday Emoghavwe (born 1963), Nigerian powerlifter
- Monday Etim (born 1998), Nigerian footballer
- Monday Floyd, 19th-century American carpenter and politician
- Monday James (born 1986), Nigerian footballer
- Monday Kiz (singer) (born 1985), South Korean singer and former member of Monday Kiz
- Monday Merotohun (born 1977), Nigerian table tennis player
- Monday Michiru (born 1963), Japanese American actress, singer, and songwriter
- Monday Okpebholo (born 1970), Nigerian businessman and politician
- Monday Onyezonwu (born 1964), Nigerian lawyer and commissioner
- Monday Osagie (born 1989), Nigerian professional footballer
- Monday Samuel (born 1993), Nigerian footballer

== See also ==
- Monday-chan, nickname for VTuber Otonose Kanade
- Monday (surname)
