= Monday (surname) =

Monday is a surname. Notable people with the surname include:

- Carl Monday, American television reporter
- Edigold Monday, Ugandan businessman
- Gift Monday (born 2001), Nigerian footballer
- Jon Monday (born 1947), American record producer
- Kenny Monday (born 1961), American wrestler
- Osborne Monday (born 1985), Kenyan footballer
- Rick Monday (born 1945), American baseball player and broadcaster
- Smoke Monday (born 1999), American football player

== See also ==
- Monday (given name)
