= Sandi Thom =

Scottish musician (born 1981)

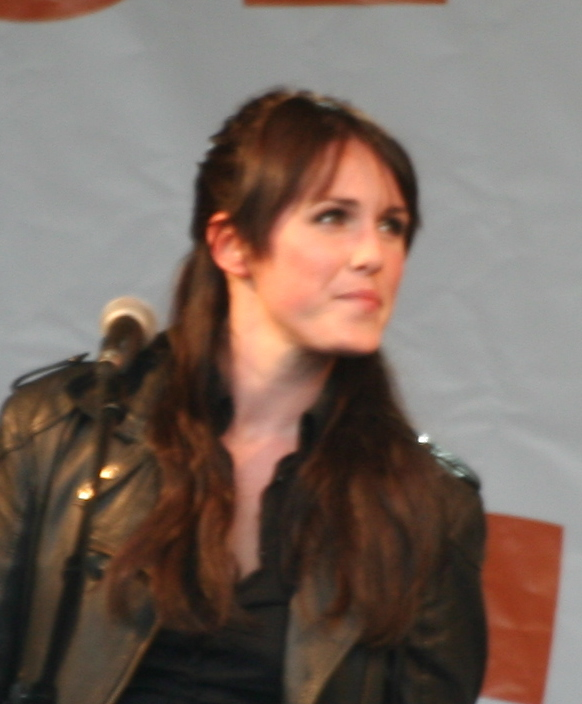
- Thom in 2008

Background information
- Born: Alexandria Thom; 11 August 1981 (age 45); Banff, Aberdeenshire, Scotland
- Genres: Pop, folk, R&B, rock, blues, acoustic
- Occupations: Singer-songwriter; multi-instrumentalist; guitarist
- Instruments: Vocals; guitar; piano; harmonica
- Years active: 2004–present
- Labels: Viking Legacy, Sony BMG, RCA, Guardian Angels
- Website: sandithommusic.com

Alexandria Thom (/tɒm/) (born 11 August 1981) is a Scottish singer-songwriter and instrumentalist who became widely known in 2006 for her debut single, "I Wish I Was a Punk Rocker (With Flowers in My Hair)". The single finished the year as the best selling single in Australia, and the 5th best selling single of 2006 in the United Kingdom. Her debut album, Smile... It Confuses People (2006), also achieved considerable commercial success, reaching number one in her native Scotland, the United Kingdom and Ireland, and was certified Platinum in the United Kingdom, whilst achieving Gold status in both Australia and New Zealand, and a Silver certification in France. The album's second single "What If I'm Right" achieved moderate commercial success.

In May 2008, she released "The Devil's Beat" as the lead single from her second studio album The Pink & the Lily which was released the following week. The single achieved only moderate commercial success, whilst the album failed to match the performance of her debut album. A second and final single, "Saturday Night", was released from the album, failing to make any chart appearance. Her subsequent albums, Merchants and Thieves (2010) and Flesh and Blood (2012) achieved some commercial success in the UK, whilst Merchant and Thieves reached number three on the Jazz & Blues Albums Charts in the United Kingdom.

== Early life ==
Thom was born in Banff. Thom spent three years playing piano and singing in a band from Gourdon in Aberdeenshire, called The Residents. Thom became the youngest student ever to be accepted at the prestigious Liverpool Institute for Performing Arts (LIPA). In 2003, Thom graduated from LIPA with a BA in Performing Arts.

Thom has assisted many charity appeals for Oxfam's work in Malawi and across east Africa.

== Career ==
=== 2004–2007: Smile... It Confuses People ===
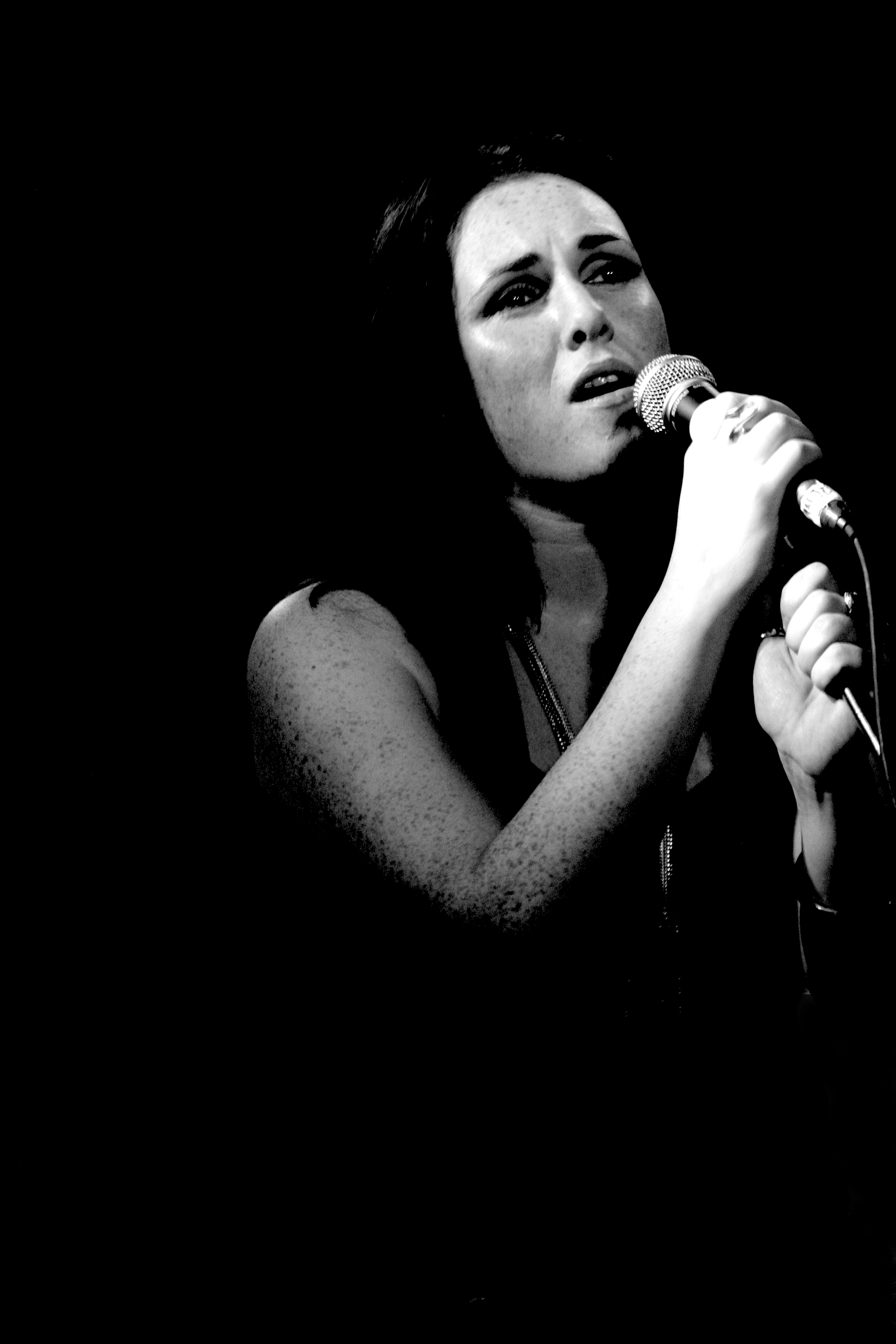
Thom performing in 2006

In 2004, Thom moved to London to pursue her songwriting career. Thom signed to Windswept Pacific Music in 2005, an independent music publishing company, and its UK arm, P&P Songs. She signed a record contract with the record label Viking Legacy, where her mother was director. At this time she was managed by Ian Brown and John Proctor at Total Artist Management. 21 Nights from Tooting was a "tour" consisting of 21 performances from the basement of her Tooting flat, from 24 February to 16 March. These were recorded and then webcast by professional hosting company Streaming Tank. Tickets were sold, but the venue had a capacity of "six people" ("10 including the band"). The MySpace post announcing the gigs was posted in the early hours of 22 February. Thom's website states that "the idea ... popped into her head" after her car broke down travelling from a gig in York (on the 22nd) to one in Wales (on the 23rd) and following the very first live webcast she did at a gig in Edinburgh organized by her PR manager, Paul Boyd from Polar Flame Music. Thom's first video webcast was at the Edinburgh Left Bank venue in October 2005.

In early 2006, news services noted Thom's promotion efforts. A PR company, Quite Great, claimed to have conducted a large publicity campaign on her behalf, including a million "virtual flyers" (unsolicited emails). In a story first published in March 2006, The Sunday Times ran a piece. It was claimed that the audience for the first day was around 60 or 70 before rising to 70,000. A Reuters story the same month mentioned that "I Wish I Was a Punk Rocker" was being re-released the following week, with the album following in April. The publicity surrounding the tour led to major label interest, with music label representatives attending the gigs in question, and the release of the records was put back until a deal was signed. Craig Logan, the managing director of RCA Records UK, said that the label was "drawn to" Thom after hearing of the webcasting, as has Thom herself. Thom subsequently accepted an offer by RCA, which led to the single re-release being delayed until May, when it was released via the major label. The news of this broke on 3 April 2006, the official signing itself being webcast. The single was placed on Music Week Daily's playlist that day.

Paul Kelly of The Independent and others have questioned how Thom was able to sustain production of the webcast, and its viewership figures, and noted that internet traffic monitors such as Alexa and Technorati show no unusual surge of interest in Thom until she began to be covered by mainstream media.

Following her online webcast concerts from her basement in Tooting, and accompanied by increasing airplay exposure, "I Wish I Was a Punk Rocker" was re-released on 22 May 2006 by RCA Records UK and debuted at number 1 on the UK Singles Chart. Thom performed on Top of the Pops, making her major terrestrial television début, and in June the song reached number one on the singles chart. The song was later nominated at the Brit Awards for Best British Single. In the Republic of Ireland, "I Wish I Was a Punk Rocker" also reached number one, and in Australia, it was number one for ten consecutive weeks, becoming Australia's highest selling single of 2006. Thom's début album, Smile... It Confuses People was released in the United Kingdom the same month and débuted at number one on the UK Albums Chart, eventually selling over one million copies worldwide. The follow-up single "What If I'm Right" reached the lower reaches of the charts, but "Lonely Girl", the third single from the album, failed to enter any charts.

=== 2007–2012: The Pink & the Lily and decline ===
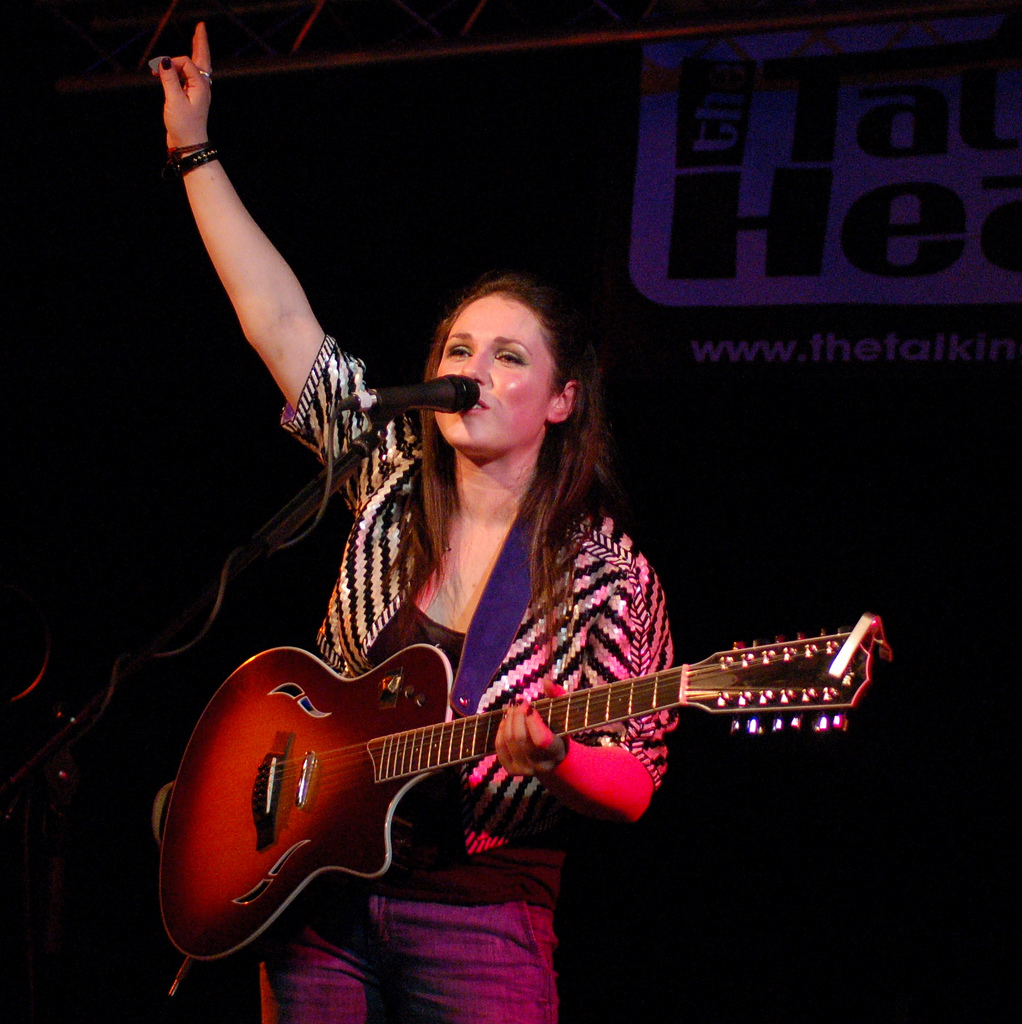
Thom performing in 2008

In May 2008, Thom released her second album, The Pink & the Lily, preceded by the first single, "The Devil's Beat". Before the release, journalists were doubtful about its appeal. The album and single received extensive airplay on BBC Radio 2. In the UK, the album entered the chart at 25 for one week before dropping out of the top 100. Thom said:

I feel like my second album was too rushed. I felt under quite a lot of pressure when I was making it. I was out on the road and my label was really hassling me to get it finished. I admit I was disappointed with it and now, when I look back, it was released too soon. There were some things that were overlooked. It wasn't thought out properly. So, with my next album, I'm going to put my foot down and spend as long as it takes to make it.

On New Year's Eve 2008, Thom headlined the stage at the Aberdeen's Hogmanay celebrations followed by an appearance on the BBC Hogmanay show from Edinburgh where she sang one song. Thom was transferred by citation jet from Aberdeen's Hogmanay street party to Edinburgh's Castle to make both performances possible that night. Thom has also performed "By Afton Water" at the official Burns Supper in celebration of Robert Burns's 250th birthday in front of Scotland's First Minister. The event was held in Alloway, Ayrshire, where Burns was born. Thom then went on to perform in the Library of Congress alongside Sir Sean Connery and a host of Scottish congress members in January 2009.

In February 2009, Thom told the press that she would be making her third album as an independent artist after it had been announced that RCA had dropped her from their label without her prior knowledge and who she then claimed pressured her during the making of her second album.

A compilation album, The Best of Sandi Thom, was released in July 2009 to fulfil contractual obligations without Thom's consent by the Sony BMG label Camden. The 18 track collection was compiled from Thom's two previous albums and various B-sides. Thom dedicated her tour of 2009 to the Homecoming Scotland campaign. The support acts for each show were local artists with special guests ranging from Phil Cunningham in Inverness, Leon Jackson at the Clyde Auditorium in Glasgow and her original guitarist Marcus Bonfanti appearing at the final show of the English leg of the tour in Milton Keynes. A duet with the first minister of Scotland, Alex Salmond, took place at one of the shows in Banff where he is the Member of Parliament, Thom has widely made her political views known and is an avid supporter of Scottish independence.

During the tour Thom released two EPs: a "Live EP" featuring recordings from the Aberdeen Castlegait Hogmanay celebrations and the "Caledonia EP" featuring a series of covers including "Patience of Angels" (originally by Eddi Reader) and the official Homecoming Scotland 2009 song "Caledonia" (written by Dougie MacLean). These recordings were only available to purchase at concerts performed on the Homecoming Tour.

=== 2012–2019: "Earthquake" controversy ===
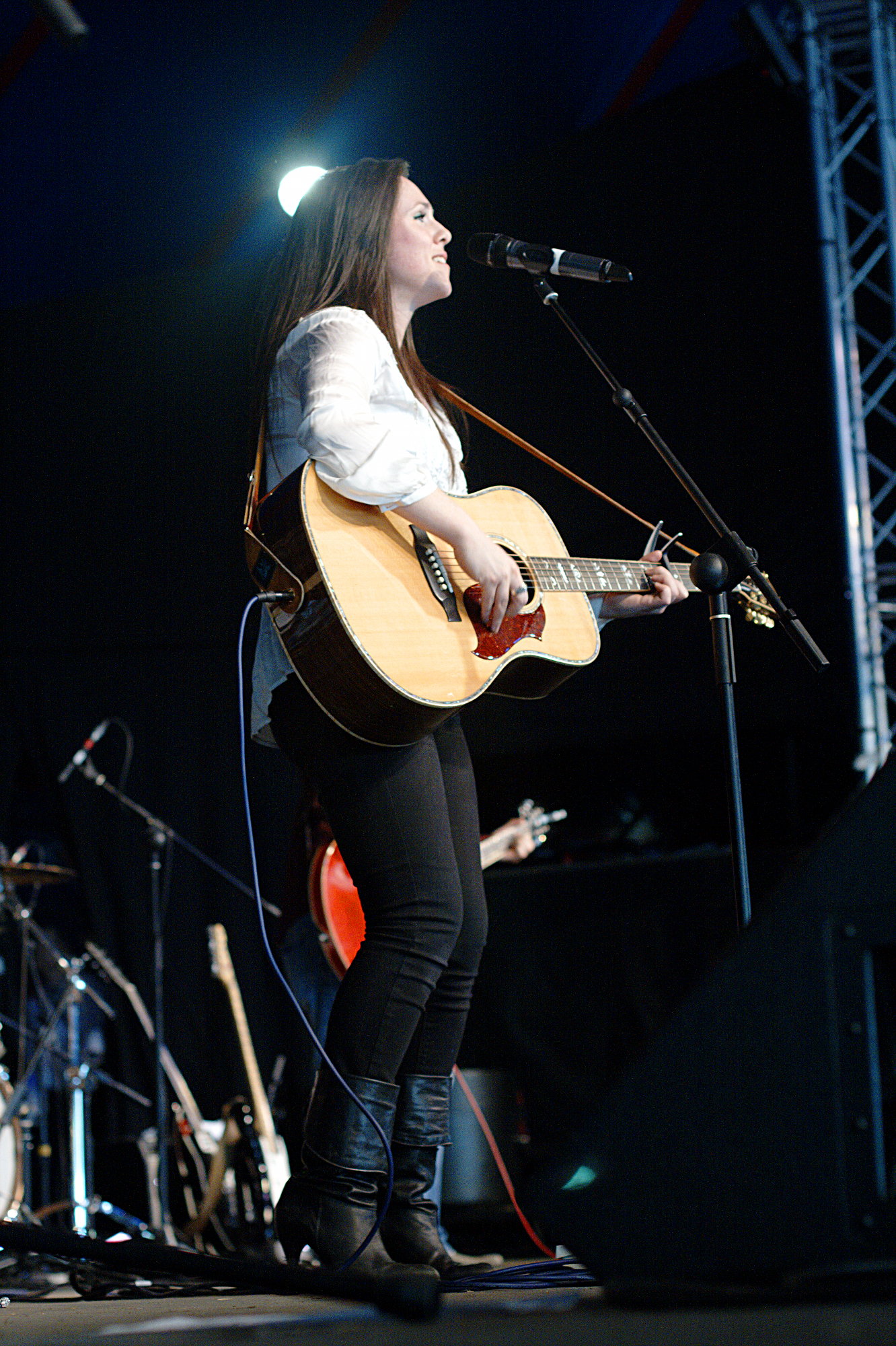
Thom performing live during her Merchants and Thieves tour in 2011

Thom's third studio album, Merchants and Thieves, was released independently in May 2010 with "This Ol' World" (featuring guitarist and then-boyfriend Joe Bonamassa) as the lead single. The album was released by Thom on her own label Guardian Angels, which she formed after her split with RCA. Musically it moves from pop folk towards blues and roots influences. Thom's cover version of the track "House of the Rising Sun" was released as a download-only single and extra track on the deluxe edition of the album. It was also given away as a free download to readers of the Scottish Mail newspaper. Merchants and Thieves was nominated for Best Album at the British Blues Awards 2011, and for Best Jazz/Blues Recording of the Year at the Scottish Music Awards. Thom was also nominated for Artist of the Year and her label Guardian Angel Recordings was nominated for Record Label of the Year.

Thom's fourth studio album, Flesh and Blood, was released in September 2012. The album was recorded in Nashville's 16 Ton Studios and features The Black Crowes guitarist Rich Robinson as guest producer, and other musicians such as Audley Freed and Rolling Stones saxophonist Bobby Keys. Thom then released her first live concert DVD, which featured a guest performance from former boyfriend Joe Bonamassa. Her fifth studio album, The Covers Collection, was released in November 2013 and was publicised as an acoustic collection of songs that Thom listened to as a teenager, including Nirvana, Guns N' Roses, Pearl Jam, Heart, and Fleetwood Mac. Thom played all instruments on the record and produced the album, which failed to chart.

In 2015, it was reported that Thom had signed to the independent label MITA Records for the release of her sixth studio album. Later that year, she attracted publicity after uploading a video to her Facebook page in which she criticised BBC Radio 2 and Bauer Media Group's radio stations for not playlisting her single "Earthquake". She said in the video, "Honest to God I'm fucking sick to death of the bullshit this industry pulls on people like me and I've had it. Enough I'm done. Fuck you Radio 2. Fuck you Bauer network and fuck the lot of you. There is no reason why you need to do this to me once again". The video was deleted shortly after attracting comment. In a subsequent interview, she accused the BBC of a bias against Scottish recording artists. Despite these comments, "Earthquake" was playlisted by many regional BBC stations and BBC Radio Scotland. In the event, MITA Records did not release Thom's album. Thom self-released the charity single "Tightrope" in March 2017 through The Famous Company, and said in an interview that no release date had been set for her next album, but she hoped it would be out by the end of 2017.

=== 2019–present: Ghosts ===
Thom released the album Ghosts in 2019. In December 2023, Thom released "Silence", the lead single from EP, Warpaint.

== Concert tours ==
=== Nationwide tours ===
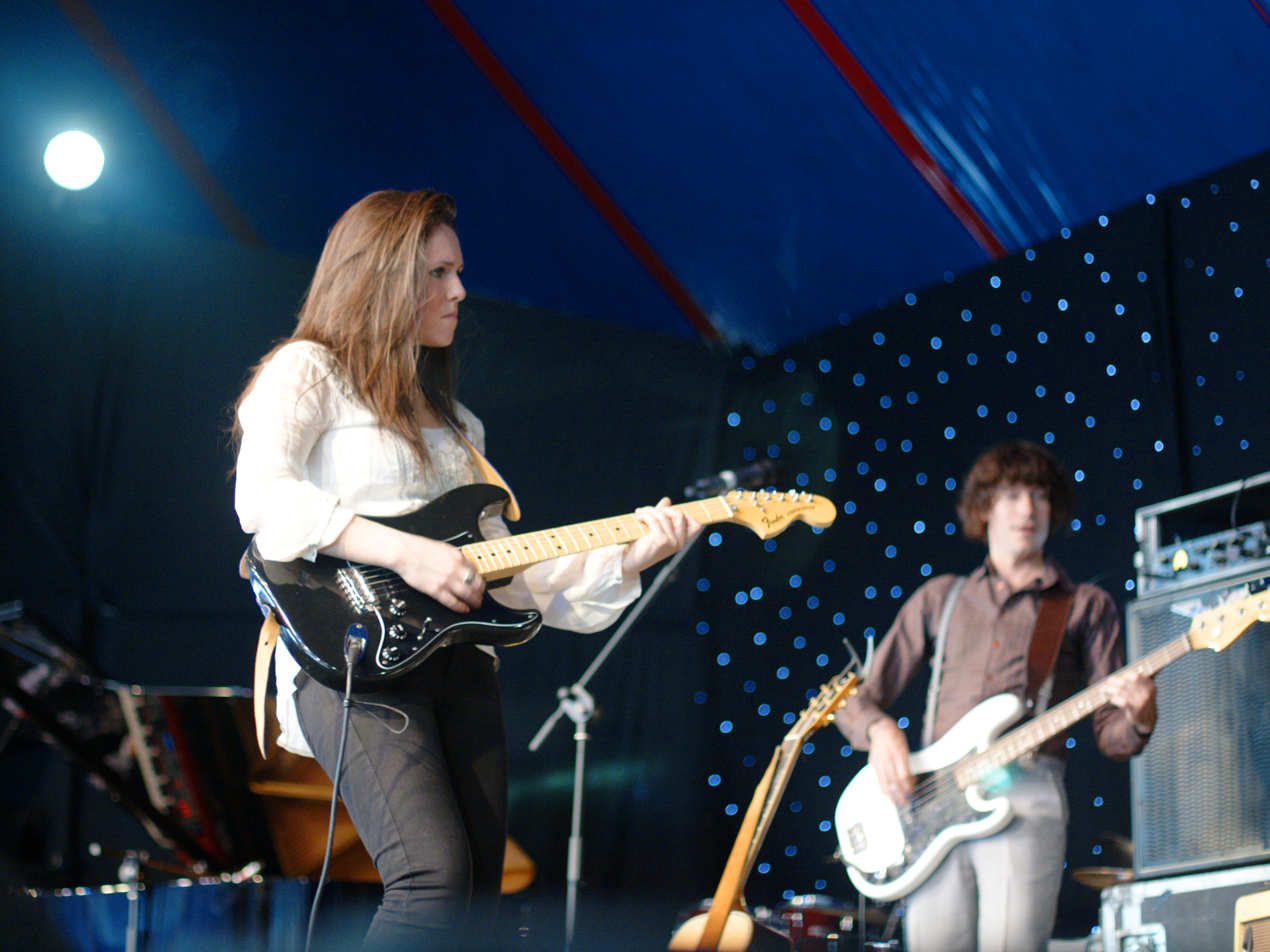
Thom performing live during her 2011 tour

Before the 21 Nights from Tooting, Thom had been actively touring in the UK in 2005. Thom made an appearance at the Northsound Radio to 40,000 Free at the Dee festival in Aberdeen on 4 September 2005; a charity gig in Edinburgh later in September 2005, and was described as "hotly-tipped" by the Daily Record. Thom supported The Proclaimers on their UK tour in December 2005 and toured with Nizlopi. She and her band continued to tour, playing the Pocklington Arts Centre near York on 22 February 2006, supported by Edwina Hayes, and the Queen's Hall Narberth in Wales on 23 February 2006. In 2008, Thom was invited by The Who's Pete Townshend to perform for the Teenage Cancer Trust at the Royal Albert Hall in London. Thom performed two more times at the Royal Albert Hall: at the Sunflower Jam alongside Queen's Brian May and Led Zeppelin's John Paul Jones (musician).

Thom has played live in several unconventional venues. She had previously performed at the opening of the World Skiing Championships in Sweden, where the stage was set up at the top of a mountain range; she performed at the top of the BT tower in London on behalf of the DMA's (Digital Music Awards), where she was nominated; she also performed for a Children in Need auction winner who paid the charity £17,000 for Thom to play her living room. She played the Main Stage at T in the Park 2006, having previously been booked for the lowest billed stage. She headlined the acoustic tent at the 2006 V Festival with Kasabian. In early 2007, Thom spent 6 weeks in France performing in every city across the country alongside a French artist at a free concert called the Ricard Live Tour to crowds of approximately 35,000 a night. She has performed at festivals such as Glastonbury, Guilfest and Redbourne; and in Scotland, the Wizard festival and the Belladrum Heart festival. Other festivals further afield included the Oxegen music festival and the World Fleadh in Ireland, and the Fuji Rock Festival in Japan. Thom supported George Michael on his stadium tour in Denmark in 2008. The same year, she performed a free 50-minute acoustic gig in front of 200 people at the broadcast centre of WDR radio station in Cologne, Germany; the gig was broadcast twice during the course of the month. Thom performed at the Blackpool Illuminations Christmas lights switch-on concert alongside presenters of the TV series Top Gear presenters.

=== Further touring ===
Thom appeared at the SXSW festival in Texas in March 2009. In April, a sold-out performance took place at the 200 capacity Crown Hotel Ballroom as part of the Nantwich Jazz Festival. Thom was invited to play a filmed set at Switzerlands Avo Session Basel, supporting Snow Patrol. This was followed by an extensive support slot for Joe Bonamassa on his UK and Irish tour dates.

Thom appeared at the Stirling Castle Hogmanay celebrations 2009. She performed alongside The MacDonald Brothers, The Shermans and Gary Mullen. Thom toured the UK in April and May 2010 to showcase new material from her album Merchants and Thieves and made a number of appearances at Festivals in the UK including The Tiree festival in Scotland and The Great British Rhythm & Blues Festival in Colne Lancashire in England. A second Merchants and Thieves tour took place in September and early October. Thom announced a tour of "intimate" venues in the UK for early 2011 as well as details of a record to be recorded in Nashville in 2011. Festival appearances, including Rhythm Festival, were also added for 2011.

In 2012, Thom returned to Australia to perform a series of concerts alongside blues singer/harmonica player Chris Wilson. Performances included Melbourne's Recital Centre. Following the release of Flesh and Blood, Thom performed an exclusive set at London's Gibson showroom and was the first artist to play the brand new 12 string Les Paul. She also made several guest appearances with Joe Bonamassa including the Usher Hall in Edinburgh. She had performed with him some years earlier at a Blues Festival in Nice, France providing lead vocals throughout, when Bonamassa was forced to rest his voice. In 2013 Thom performed a series of concerts all over the world including Australia, UK, Holland and ending in Scandinavia late December 2013. She changed her live show and went out as a solo act simultaneously playing 12 string guitar, stomp box, vocals and harmonica.

=== Royal Albert Hall ===
In April 2014, Thom made a guest performance at the Royal Albert Hall, She also performed a series of US concerts including Chicago, Nashville, at New York City's B. B. King Blues Club, plus in Charlotte, and Portland, Maine. Thom booked and promoted all the shows herself. In late 2014, Thom undertook a six-week tour of Australia and for the first time performed a series of concerts in New Zealand, mainly in the South Island. Thom performed at the Narooma Blues Festival in Australia in 2014, and then went on to perform a four-week tour of the UK.

Thom announced in August 2018 that she was taking up a Friday night residency for the foreseeable future in the Privee Jazz Lounge Bar at the Domain Hotel in Bahrain.

== Discography ==
- Smile... It Confuses People (2006)
- The Pink & the Lily (2008)
- Merchants and Thieves (2010)
- Flesh and Blood (2012)
- The Covers Collection (2013)
- Ghosts (2019)

== Awards and nominations ==
In 2007, her single "I Wish I Was a Punk Rocker (With Flowers in My Hair)" was nominated for the Brit Award for Song of the Year. Her third studio album, Merchant and Thieves was nominated for Best Jazz/Blues Recording of the Year in the Scottish Music Awards in 2011. Thom was also nominated for Artist of the Year and her label "Guardian Angel Recordings" was nominated for Record Label of the Year.
