= Monday.com =

Cloud-based project management software

Monday.com Ltd.
- Formerly: dapulse (2012–2017)
- Type: Public
- Traded as: Nasdaq: MNDY
- Industry: Process management, project management software, productivity software, team management
- Founded: February 2012; 14 years ago (as dapulse)
- Founders: Roy Mann; Eran Zinman
- Headquarters: Tel Aviv, Israel
- Key people: Roy Mann (co-CEO); Eran Zinman (co-CEO)
- Services: Process management, project management software, productivity software, team management, customer relationship management, collaborative software
- Revenue: ▲US$1,232 million (2025)
- Operating income: ▲US$−1.7 million (2025)
- Net income: ▲US$118 million (2025)
- Total assets: ▲US$2.11 billion (2025)
- Total equity: ▲US$1,246 million (2025)
- Number of employees: 3,155 (2025)
- Website: monday.com

Monday.com Ltd. (styled in lowercase as monday.com) is an Israeli software company based in Tel Aviv. It develops work management software. The platform was launched in 2014 and then relaunched in July 2019.

== History ==
The company began in 2012 as DaPulse, before renaming itself Monday.com in 2017. Its product was initially developed on Wix.com since 2010, before spun off as a separate startup in 2012, with Wix as its first customer and supporter. DaPulse raised $1.5 million in seed funding that August, before commercially launching its product in 2014.

The company went public on June 10, 2021, As of 2025, the company reported it had 2,508 employees, and was serving over 245,000 customers. Co-founders Eran Zinman and Roy Mann serve as co-CEOs.

In February 2026, monday.com's stock dropped 21% amid broader investor concerns about agentic AI tools potentially disrupting traditional SaaS work management platforms, in what was termed "SaaS-Pocolypse".

In June 2026, the company launched Monday Ventures, a venture capital firm investing in Israeli technology startups.

In July 2026, monday.com fired twenty-percent of its work force.

== Product ==
Monday.com develops work management software, with no code development features.

The company uses agentic AI, including a context aware AI assistant, and AI-based workflow and coding tools.

== See also ==
- Comparison of project management software
- List of collaborative software
