= Saturday (Yo La Tengo song) =

2000 single by Yo La Tengo

Single by Yo La Tengo

from the album And Then Nothing Turned Itself Inside-Out
- Released: January 31 2000
- Recorded: 1999
- Genre: Indietronica; ambient pop; post-rock
- Songwriters: Ira Kaplan, Georgia Hubley and James McNew

Yo La Tengo singles chronology
"You Can Have It All" (2000)	"Saturday" (2000)

"Saturday" is a song by American indie rock band Yo La Tengo, released as the second single from their 2000 album And Then Nothing Turned Itself Inside-Out. It reached number 92 in the UK Singles Chart.

== Legacy ==
PopMatters included the song in their list "Popular Songs: 15 (Or So) Essential Yo La Tengo Tracks", writing, "The centerpiece of 2000's mood-heavy And Then Nothing Turned Itself Inside-Out, 'Saturday' is Yo La Tengo's most striking foray into something resembling electronic music."
