= Friday Bridge (band) =

- Origin: Sweden
- Genres: Pop
- Years active: 2004 – present
- Label: But is it Art?
- Website: Official website

Friday Bridge is a Swedish pop band. The band has released two EPs and two albums since 2004. Friday Bridge's sound has been described as a mix between 1980s electronic pop and music from the 18th century - particularly referring to the use of harpsichord. The band is named after a village in Cambridgeshire, Great Britain.

== Discography ==
- The Lady Julie (2004), EP, Best Kept Secret LIE084
- Friday Bridge 2 (2005), EP, Bedroom BED025
- Intricacy (2007), album, But is it Art? ART005
- Bite My Tongue (2009), album, But is it Art? ART012
- Dark Heart (featuring Nicolas Makelberge) (2011), single, But is it Art? ART017
