= Monday (play) =

Play by Gloria Idahota Williams

Monday is a one-woman stage play written and performed by Actress and Playwright Gloria Idahota Williams and directed by Ellie Joseph. The play was produced under the Theatre company Freedom Tongues and developed as part of the Royal Court Theatre Young Writers group. Monday premiered at four International Play festivals such as New York City, London, and Edinburgh and was shortlisted for the Alfred Fagon Award 2009.

== Plot ==
The play starts on Monday morning with the play’s central character, Neena, getting ready for school. Neena is an 18-year-old, preparing for university who is haunted by a past experience. Neena is desperate to protect her younger half-sister from the same fate and we see how this event from Neena’s childhood affects her relationship with each member of her family, her peers at school, and her confused view of herself. The play depicts a disturbing series of events that harm and eventually destroy the world of what appears to everyone else to be a typical, church-going North London, Jamaican family. With a poetic and rhythmic writing style, the play evokes not only the individual emotions and journeys of the characters, but also the specific North London-‘speak’ of the world in which the characters live.

== Critical response ==
Monday premiered at the 25th Annual Lost One Act Festival in London and was Awarded "Best Overall Production" by critic and judicator Jeremy Kingston of The Times. It had its New York Premier at the Manhattan Repertory Theatre as part of the New York Amazing Play Festival and Gloria Williams received a "Best Actress" Award. It had its second New York showing at the Samuel French Off Broadway One Act Play Festival at the Peter Jay Sharp Theatre after being selected out of 800 submissions worldwide.

The Play had a preview at Theatre 503 before having a four-week run at the Edinburgh International Festival and received 5 stars from notable Theatre critics. The British Theatre Guide who wrote, " Gloria Williams is a star in the making... Monday has all the power and intensity of the best drama, whilst using inventive and cleverly rhymed-language throughout." Although not making the short list, Williams performance was considered for the Stage Awards for Acting Excellence.

Monday was nominated for the Ogeyinka Merit Award of Excellence the following year.
