= Friday (surname) =

Friday is a surname. Notable people with the surname include:

- David Friday (1876–1945), American educator
- Elmer Otto Friday (1924–2006), American judge and politician
- Fred Friday (born 1995), Nigerian footballer
- Gavin Friday (born 1959), Irish singer, composer and painter
- Hershel Friday (1922–1994), American lawyer
- Mike Friday (born 1972), English rugby player and coach
- Nancy Friday (1933–2017), American author
- Pat Friday (1921–2016), American singer
- Robin Friday (1952–1990), English footballer
- Tim Friday (born 1961), American ice hockey player
- William C. Friday (1920–2012), American educator

== See also ==
- Friday (given name)
- Freitag (disambiguation) and Freytag as a name in German
