= Girl Friday =

Girl Friday may refer to:

- Girl Friday (idiom), a feminine variation of the phrase "Man Friday"
- Girl Friday (TV programme), a 1994 BBC television reality show
- Girl Friday, a 2009 TV pilot for Channel 4's Comedy Showcase
- His Girl Friday, a 1940 motion picture
