= I Wish I Was a Punk Rocker (With Flowers in My Hair) =

2005 single by Sandi Thom

Single by Sandi Thom

from the album Smile... It Confuses People
- B-side: "Little Remedy"; "Something in the Air"; "No More Heroes"; "A Light as Bright as Ours"; "May You Never"
- Released: 3 October 2005
- Genre: Pop
- Length: 2:30
- Label: Viking Legacy; Sony BMG; RCA
- Songwriters: Tom Gilbert; Sandi Thom
- Producers: Tom Gilbert; Stephen Darrell Smith

Sandi Thom singles chronology
| "I Wish I Was a Punk Rocker (With Flowers in My Hair)" (2005) | "What If I'm Right" (2006) |

Music video
- "I Wish I Was a Punk Rocker (With Flowers in My Hair)" on YouTube

Re-issued cover art
- Cover art for 2006 release

"I Wish I Was a Punk Rocker (With Flowers in My Hair)" is a song by Scottish singer-songwriter Sandi Thom, released as her debut single in October 2005. The song was written by Thom and Tom Gilbert. Following a re-release in 2006, the song topped the singles charts of Australia, Ireland, and the United Kingdom. However, critical reaction to the song was largely negative, especially regarding the lyrics.

== Inspiration ==
Thom has said on her website that she wrote the song after being robbed of her mobile phone and other belongings one evening, leaving her completely lost and without any way of contacting her family, friends, or the bank. She says, "I wondered if that had happened to me back in the days of the hippies what would I have done and would I have freaked out so much?"

== Release ==
Although only physically released in the United Kingdom on 22 May 2006, download sales the week before are counted for the purpose of charts, and it achieved number fifteen on this basis in the general charts (and number seven in the download-only chart). The physical release had three formats: two CD versions (one featuring the radio mix and "A Light as Bright as Ours", another featuring the radio mix, the album mix, a further remix, "May You Never" and the music video), and also as a 7-inch vinyl record backed with Stranglers cover "No More Heroes".

== Critical reception ==
Most reviews of the song were negative. For AllMusic, Thom Jurek called the song "a hopelessly naïve, cleverly worded musical ditty that is reminiscent of something used to sell European automobiles." Criticising the intense public relations efforts to make the single popular, Charlie Brooker of The Guardian called the song "a boneheaded plea for authenticity, sung in the most Tupperware tones imaginable." Brooker also added: "It's not 'art', it's 'content'." Virgin Media was even more harsh, describing the song as "dreary rose-tinted drivel sung by a girl with a voice like wind billowing up an old drainpipe." In 2017, NME named the song among the worst of the 2000s: "...had this song not existed within a viral fad, literally nobody would care." NME also responded to the song title: "...Johnny Rotten wouldn’t be seen dead with flowers in his hair."

For Yahoo! Music, Dan Gennoe had a more positive review of the song, calling it "a cunningly perfect piece of pop." Similarly, RTÉ music critic Linda McGee defended Thom against popular backlash: "...truth be known, there aren't many of us who haven't wished that we could be transported to another time or place at some point in our lives." Andy Gill of The Independent said the song was "original enough to merit its success, but hardly enough to carry an entire album". In the 2006 Record of the Year online poll, "I Wish I Was a Punk Rocker" finished eighth out of 10 nominees.

Thom was criticized by several recording artists, including Lily Allen, the Fratellis, and the Automatic. James Frost and Robin Hawkins from the Automatic stated that "If she was a punk rocker with flowers in her hair she'd get the shit kicked out of her by other punk rockers."

== Chart performance ==
The song was released on 3 October 2005 by Viking Legacy Records, reaching number 55 in the UK Singles Chart. It was re-released in May 2006 on Sony BMG's RCA Records label, selling 39,797 copies in the week ending 3 June 2006, enough to reach number one on the UK Singles Chart, replacing Gnarls Barkley's "Crazy" following a nine-week run. It spent one week at the top spot and went on to be the UK's fifth-best-selling single of the year. The single also spent 10 weeks at number one in Australia, where it finished the year as the country's highest-selling single. It received a double platinum certification from the Australian Recording Industry Association.

== Music video ==
The music video was shot in Bethnal Green in London and is all one shot.

== Track listings ==
UK CD1 (2005)

1. "I Wish I Was a Punk Rocker (With Flowers in My Hair)" – 2:30
2. "Little Remedy" – 3:01

UK CD2 (2005)

1. "I Wish I Was a Punk Rocker (With Flowers in My Hair)" – 2:30
2. "Something in the Air" – 4:15
3. "No More Heroes" – 2:46
4. "I Wish I Was a Punk Rocker (With Flowers in My Hair)" (video)

UK 7-inch single (2006)

A. "I Wish I Was a Punk Rocker (With Flowers in My Hair)" (radio mix) – 2:31
B. "No More Heroes" – 2:46

UK CD1 (2006)

1. "I Wish I Was a Punk Rocker (With Flowers in My Hair)" (radio mix) – 2:31
2. "A Light as Bright as Ours" – 3:55

UK CD2 and Australian CD single (2006)

1. "I Wish I Was a Punk Rocker (With Flowers in My Hair)" (radio mix) – 2:33
2. "I Wish I Was a Punk Rocker (With Flowers in My Hair)" (album version) – 2:31
3. "I Wish I Was a Punk Rocker (With Flowers in My Hair)" (Mutiny's Rockers & Lovers mix) – 3:02
4. "May You Never" – 3:45
5. "I Wish I Was a Punk Rocker (With Flowers in My Hair)" (video) – 2:39

European CD single (2006)

1. "I Wish I Was a Punk Rocker (With Flowers in My Hair)" (album version) – 2:31
2. "A Light as Bright as Ours" – 3:55
3. "I Wish I Was a Punk Rocker (With Flowers in My Hair)" (Mutiny's Rockers & Lovers mix) – 3:04

== Charts ==
=== Weekly charts ===
| Chart (2006–2007) | Peak position |
|---|---|
| Australia (ARIA) | 1 |
| Austria (Ö3 Austria Top 40) | 27 |
| Belgium (Ultratip Bubbling Under Wallonia) | 13 |
| Europe (Eurochart Hot 100) | 4 |
| France (SNEP) | 8 |
| Germany (GfK) | 16 |
| Ireland (IRMA) | 1 |
| Netherlands (Single Top 100) | 56 |
| New Zealand (Recorded Music NZ) | 3 |
| Scottish Singles Sales (Official Charts) | 1 |
| Sweden (Sverigetopplistan) | 3 |
| Switzerland (Schweizer Hitparade) | 62 |
| UK Singles (Official Charts) | 1 |

=== Year-end charts ===
| Chart (2006) | Position |
|---|---|
| Australia (ARIA) | 1 |
| Europe (Eurochart Hot 100) | 57 |
| Germany (Media Control GfK) | 100 |
| Ireland (IRMA) | 6 |
| New Zealand (RIANZ) | 19 |
| Sweden (Hitlistan) | 26 |
| UK Singles (OCC) | 5 |

| Chart (2007) | Position |
|---|---|
| France (SNEP) | 64 |

=== Decade-end charts ===
| Chart (2000–2009) | Position |
|---|---|
| Australia (ARIA) | 34 |

== Certifications ==
| Region | Certification | Certified units/sales |
|---|---|---|
| Australia (ARIA) | 2× Platinum | 140,000^{^} |
| Sweden (GLF) | Gold | 10,000^{^} |
| United Kingdom (BPI) | Gold | 400,000^{^} |
^{^} Shipments figures based on certification alone.
