= The Pink & the Lily =

The Pink & The Lily

Studio album by Sandi Thom
- Released: (United Kingdom) 26 May 2008 (UK)
- Genres: Pop, Folk, Pop rock, Country pop
- Labels: RCA, Sony BMG
- Producers: Jake Field, Duncan Thompson

Sandi Thom chronology
Smile... It Confuses People (2006)	The Pink & The Lily (2008)	Merchants and Thieves (2010)

Singles from The Pink & The Lily
- 1. "The Devil's Beat" Released: 19 May 2008; 2. "Saturday Night" Released: 25 August 2008

Professional ratings
Review scores
Source	Rating
BBC.co.uk	(favorable)
New Zealand Herald	2/5 stars
Sunday Express	2/5 stars
The Guardian	2/5 stars
The Mirror	2/5 stars
The Scotsman	2/5 stars
The Times	2/5 stars

The Pink & The Lily is the second studio album by the Scottish singer Sandi Thom, released in both the United Kingdom and Ireland on 26 May 2008 by RCA Records. The album had been released on iTunes on 24 May 2008. The album is a mix of pop and folk songs – written by Thom herself, alongside other writers including her boyfriend, Jake Field, and Tom Gilbert, and produced by Jake Field and Duncan Thompson, who work under the alias of The Mighty Vibrations.

The album entered the UK Albums Chart at number 25, then dropped to 65 the following week, before dropping out of the top 75.

== Singles ==
The album's first single, "The Devil's Beat," reached #58 in the UK Singles Chart. The second single, "Saturday Night", was released digitally on 25 August 2008, but failed to chart.

== Name ==
The album's title is a reference to a pub in Lacey Green, Buckinghamshire, originally owned by two ex-employees of the local Hampden family, the butler Mr Pink and the chambermaid Miss Lilie. They had to flee after Miss Lilie fell pregnant and the family shunned them - their illegitimate son set up the pub and named it after his parents. Thom has said in interviews that the story inspired the title track of the album.

== Track listing ==
No.	Title	Writer(s)	Length
1.	"The Devil's Beat"	Sandi Thom, Jake Field; Duncan Thomson	2:22
2.	"Shape I'm In"	Sandi Thom, Marcus Bonfanti, Craig Connet	4:00
3.	"Wounded Hearts"	Sandi Thom	3:25
4.	"Saturday Night"	Sandi Thom, Jake Field, Duncan Thompson, Tom Gilbert	3:16
5.	"Beatbox"	Sandi Thom, Tom Gilbert	3:16
6.	"Remote Control Me"	Sandi Thom, Jake Field, Duncan Thomson	2:47
7.	"Success's Ladder"	Sandi Thom, Jake Field, Duncan Thomson, Tom Gilbert	3:12
8.	"Mirrors"	Sandi Thom, Robert Hadderall, Tom Gilbert	3:59
9.	"Music in My Soul"	Sandi Thom, Rick Knowles	4:10
10.	"The Pink and the Lily"	Sandi Thom, Tom Gilbert	3:23
11.	"I'm a Human Being"	Sandi Thom, Jake Field, Duncan Thomson, Tom Gilbert	3:01
12.	"The Last Picturehouse"	Sandi Thom, Jake Field	4:30
13.	"My Ungrateful Heart"	Sandi Thom, Jake Field, Duncan Thompson	3:10

iTunes Bonus Track
No.	Title	Writer(s)	Length
14.	"Life on Mars"	David Bowie	3:41

Japanese Bonus Tracks
No.	Title	Writer(s)	Length
14.	"Speed of Life"	Sandi Thom, Jake Field, Duncan Thomson, Tom Gilbert	2:48
15.	"The Ghost of Stevie Ray"	Sandi Thom, Jake Field, Duncan Thomson	3:49
16.	"The Monster's Called a Band"	Sandi Thom, Jake Field, Duncan Thomson, Tom Gilbert	3:50

Left Over Tracks from The Pink and the Lily Sessions
No.	Title	Writer(s)	Length
14.	"Rainbird"		3:07
15.	"Days of Summer"	Duncan Thompson, Jake Field, Sandi Thom	2:45

=== Promotion ===
To promote the album Thom has travelled around her home country, Scotland, appearing in HMV branches in Aberdeen, Dundee, Perth and Edinburgh, performing tracks from her new album and signing records. This was followed by the Pink & Lily Tour to promote the new release which failed to sell out was enthusiastically received by those who attended.

== Release details ==
Country	Date	Label	Format	Catalog
United Kingdom	2008-05-26	RCA Records	CD	86972994024
