= Merchants and Thieves =

Studio album by Sandi Thom
- Released: 17 May 2010 (UK)
- Recorded: 2009–2010
- Genre: Folk rock, Blues
- Length: 46:10
- Label: Guardian Angels
- Producer: Sandi Thom

Sandi Thom chronology
The Pink & The Lily (2008)	Merchants and Thieves (2010)	Flesh and Blood (2012)

Singles from Merchants and Thieves
- 1. "This Ol' World" Released: 19 April 2010; 2. "Gold Dust" Released: 19 July 2010; 3. "House Of the Rising Sun" Released: 5 December 2010; 4. "Maggie McCall" Released: 2010 (Promo only)

Professional ratings
Review scores
Source	Rating
AllMusic	3.5/5 stars

Merchants and Thieves is the third studio album by Scottish pop singer Sandi Thom, released on 17 May 2010. The album was released through Thom's own record label 'Guardian Angels' after being dropped by her former label Sony BMG. Commercially, it failed to match the success experienced by her previous two albums, however, it did debut at number sixty-three on the albums charts in her native Scotland, and peaked at number three on the United Kingdom Jazz & Blues Albums Chart.

== Background and release ==
Thom's third studio album Merchants and Thieves was released on 17 May 2010 with "This Ol' World" as the lead single. The album was published by Thom on her own "Guardian Angels" label, which she formed after being dropped by RCA. Musically it moves from pop folk towards blues and roots. The album entered the UK official chart at 118 on its first week of release before dropping out of the top 200. The single was made available as a download-only release in April 2010.

A second single "Gold Dust" (smoking gun remix) was released as a download-only in July 2010 but failed to enter the official UK Chart. A deluxe edition with extra tracks and video of the single "Gold Dust" was released as a download in February 2011.This was followed by a physical release made available on Thoms website Thom's cover version of the classic track "House of the Rising Sun" was released as a download-only single and extra track on the deluxe edition of the album. It was also given away as a free download to readers of the Scottish Mail newspaper. The album was nominated for Best Album in the British Blues Awards 2011.

The album was nominated for Best Jazz/Blues Recording of the Year in the Scottish Music Awards. Thom was also nominated for Artist of the Year and her label "Guardian Angel Recordings" was nominated for Record Label of the Year.

== Reception ==
"Merchants and Thieves" received a positive review by The Scotsman: "Musically, she struts a good game ... The challenge will be to convince others that she was 'born in the belly of the blues'".

== Track listing ==
No.	Title	Writer(s)	Length
1.	"Maggie McCall"	Jake Field, Randall Breneman, Sandi Thom	3:49
2.	"Runaway Train"	Jake Field, Sandi Thom	4:26
3.	"Gold Dust"	Jake Field, Sandi Thom	3:50
4.	"Let It Stay"	Jake Field, Randall Breneman, Sandi Thom	4:39
5.	"Merchants and Thieves"	Sandi Thom	3:41
6.	"Show No Concern"	Jake Field, Randall Breneman, Sandi Thom	3:33
7.	"This Ol' World" (featuring Joe Bonamassa)	Craig Connet, Jake Field, Lindsey Cleary, Randall Breneman, Sandi Thom, Scott Wiber	3:17
8.	"The Sadness"	Duncan Thompson, Sandi Thom	3:48
9.	"Heart of Stone"	Jake Field, Marcus Bonfanti, Sandi Thom	3:48
10.	"Ghost Town"	Jake Field, Sandi Thom	2:42
11.	"Belly of the Blues"	Jake Field, Randall Breneman, Sandi Thom	5:31
12.	"This Ol' World (Sunset Marquis Version)"	Craig Connet, Jake Field, Lindsey Cleary, Randall Breneman, Sandi Thom, Scott Wiber	3:06

iTunes Bonus Tracks
No.	Title	Writer(s)	Length
13.	"I Need Your Love So Bad"	Little Willie John, Mertis John Jr.	4:10
14.	"If Heartaches Were Nickels"	Warren Haynes	4:30

== Awards and nominations ==
The album was nominated for Best Jazz/Blues Recording of the Year in the Scottish Music Awards. Thom was also nominated for Artist of the Year and her label "Guardian Angel Recordings" was nominated for Record Label of the Year.

== Chart performance ==
Chart (2010)	Peak position
Scottish Albums Chart	63
UK Jazz & Blues Albums Chart	3
UK Albums Chart	118
