= What If I'm Right =

2006 single by Sandi Thom

Single by Sandi Thom

from the album Smile... It Confuses People
- B-side: "Cinderella in Reverse"; "Don't Think Twice"
- Released: 28 August 2006
- Length: 2:58
- Label: Viking Legacy; RCA
- Songwriters: Tom Gilbert; Sandi Thom
- Producers: Rick Parkhouse; The Mighty Vibrations

Sandi Thom singles chronology
"I Wish I Was a Punk Rocker (With Flowers in My Hair)" (2005)	"What If I'm Right" (2006)	"Lonely Girl" (2006)

"What If I'm Right" is a song written by Tom Gilbert and Sandi Thom that was recorded for Thom's debut album, Smile... It Confuses People (2006). The song was released in the UK on 28 August 2006 as a digital download. According to Thom's official website, the song "explores the bittersweetness of a newfound relationship, where the excitement of what there is to gain is eclipsed by the fear of what there could be to lose". Upon its release, "What If I'm Right" reached the top 40 in Australia, Ireland, New Zealand, and the United Kingdom, where it peaked at number 22 on the UK Singles Chart.

== Track listings ==
UK CD1

1. "What If I'm Right" (radio mix) – 2:56
2. "Cinderella in Reverse" – 2:38

UK CD2

1. "What If I'm Right" (radio mix) – 2:56
2. "What If I'm Right" (acoustic) – 3:23
3. "Don't Think Twice" – 2:24
4. "What If I'm Right" (video) – 2:57

Digital download EP

1. "What If I'm Right" – 2:58
2. "Cinderella in Reverse" – 2:37
3. "Don't Think Twice" – 2:23
4. "What If I'm Right" (acoustic) – 3:24

== Charts ==
Chart (2006)	Peak position
Australia (ARIA)	36
Ireland (IRMA)	30
New Zealand (Recorded Music NZ)	35
Scotland Singles (OCC)	8
UK Singles (OCC)	22
Ukraine Airplay (TopHit)	140

== Release history ==
Region	Date	Format(s)	Label(s)	Ref(s).
United Kingdom	28 August 2006	CD; digital download	Viking Legacy; RCA	
Australia	27 November 2006	CD	Viking Legacy; RCA	
