= Smile... It Confuses People =

Studio album by Sandi Thom
- Released: 5 June 2006
- Genre: Pop, folk
- Length: 32:05
- Label: RCAMG
- Producer: Jake Field, Rick Parkhouse, Duncan Thompson

Sandi Thom chronology
Smile... It Confuses People (2006)	The Pink & The Lily (2008)

Singles from Smile... It Confuses People
- 1. "I Wish I Was a Punk Rocker (With Flowers in My Hair)" Released: 3 October 2005; 2. "What If I'm Right" Released: 28 August 2006; 3. "Lonely Girl" Released: 4 December 2006

Smile... It Confuses People is the debut studio album by Scottish singer Sandi Thom. It was released in both Ireland and the United Kingdom on 5 June 2006 by RCA Records (although the back of the album bears the RCA Music Group logo instead). The album is a mix of pop and folk, predominantly written by Thom herself alongside Tom Gilbert.

The album produced Thom's first number-one single—"I Wish I Was a Punk Rocker (With Flowers in My Hair)"—on the UK Singles Chart, the Irish Singles Chart, and Australia's ARIA Singles Chart. In the latter country, the song spent the longest period at number-one in 2006 (10 weeks) and became the country's highest-selling single for 2006. The album also generated another two singles, but they both failed to replicate the success of the first single. Smile... It Confuses People was certified platinum by BPI selling three hundred thousand copies around the UK. However, critical reception was generally unfavourable.

== Critical reception ==
Professional ratings
Review scores
Source	Rating
Allmusic	3/5 stars
Contactmusic	3/10 stars
The Guardian	3/5 stars
The Independent	2/5 stars
Metro	2/5 stars
RTÉ	3/5 stars
The Scotsman	2/5 stars
Virgin Media	1/5 stars
Yahoo! Music	7/10 stars

Critical reviews of the album were mixed to negative. In a three-star (out of five) review allmusic, Thom Jurek said of "I Wish I Was a Punk Rocker": "...it's a hopelessly naïve, cleverly worded musical ditty that is reminiscent of something used to sell European automobiles." However, Jurek also praised tracks "Lonely Girl" and "Sunset Borderline" as "simple acoustic songs [that] become big, swirling numbers that touch on '70s female singer/songwriter empathy." Virgin Media rated the album one of five stars, calling the album "retro, technophobic" and commented on Thom's approach to 1970s folk pop: "...Thom lacks the charisma or the musicianship to bring the sound into the 21st century without coming over like a covers act."

In Thom's native Scotland, The Scotsman rated the album two out of five stars, with critic Kenneth Walton commenting: "...beyond her digital rags-to-riches story, there really isn't anything to mark out this Banff native from the legions of other rootsy pop troubadours strumming in bars up and down the country." Linda McGee of Irish public broadcaster RTÉ had a mixed review: "Nothing here is overproduced. Nothing is overly dressed up with musical trickery. It's all very stripped down, some guitar strumming and percussion for the most part - that simple."

Yahoo! Music critic Dan Gennoe had a more positive review, rated seven out of 10 stars: "Every song comes preloaded with an unmissable hook, endearing melody and wide-eyed idealism which only a real humbug would chide." Gennoe did offer a contrasting view questioning the authenticity of the music: "At no point does Thom sound like she's singing from the heart, just trying to reach the widest possible demographic."

== Chart performance ==
The album went straight to number one in its week of release in the UK. It spent a total of eighteen weeks in the UK top forty. It has since gone platinum in the UK and has sold over 1 million copies worldwide.

In Australia the album reached its peak at #11. On its ninth week in the chart at number fifteen the album was certified gold by ARIA selling thirty-five thousand copies around Australia. It was the seventy-eighth highest selling album for 2006.

I Wish I Was a Punk Rocker (With Flowers in My Hair) was the first song released from the album and topped the UK, Ireland Singles Chart for two weeks the Australian ARIA Singles Chart for ten weeks making it the highest selling single for 2006. It was accredited Double Platinum (140,000 units) by ARIA. "What If I'm Right" was the second song released from the album and reached 22 in the UK and 30 in the Irish chart and top forty in Australia and New Zealand. "Lonely Girl" was the third song released from the album available for digital download only released in the UK on 4 December 2006 and did not chart.

== Track listing ==
Standard Edition
No.	Title	Writer(s)	Length
1.	"When Horsepower Meant What It Said"	Sandi Thom; Tom Gilbert	3:05
2.	"I Wish I Was a Punk Rocker (With Flowers in My Hair)"	Sandi Thom; Tom Gilbert	2:31
3.	"Lonely Girl"	Sandi Thom	3:10
4.	"Sunset Borderline"	Duncan Thompson; Jake Field; Sandi Thom	3:36
5.	"Little Remedy"	Duncan Thompson; Jake Field; Sandi Thom	2:53
6.	"Castles"	Jake Field; Sandi Thom; Tom Gilbert	4:25
7.	"What If I'm Right"	Sandi Thom; Tom Gilbert	2:58
8.	"Superman"	Sandi Thom; Tom Gilbert	2:43
9.	"Human Jukebox"	Sandi Thom; Tom Gilbert	3:19
10.	"Time"	Simon Perry; Sandi Thom	3:20

First Pressing
No.	Title	Writer(s)	Length
11.	"Under the Sun"	John McLaughlin; Nick Cook; Sandi Thom	3:22

Japan Edition
No.	Title	Writer(s)	Length
11.	"May You Never"	John Martyn	3:43
12.	"Don't Think Twice"	Bob Dylan; Hugues Aufray	2:24

Sandithom.com Bonus Track
No.	Title	Writer(s)	Length
1.	"Soul Mining"	Sandi Thom	3:25

== Charts and certifications ==
=== Weekly charts ===
Chart (2006)	Peak position
Australian Albums (ARIA)	11
Dutch Albums (Album Top 100)	75
French Albums (SNEP)	43
German Albums (Offizielle Top 100)	42
Irish Albums (IRMA)	1
New Zealand Albums (RMNZ)	5
Scottish Albums (OCC)	1
UK Albums (OCC)	1

=== Year-end charts ===
Chart (2006)	Position
Australian Albums (ARIA)	78
UK Albums (OCC)	68

== Certifications ==
Chart	Certification	Sales/shipments
Australia (ARIA)	Gold	35,000
France (SNEP)	Silver	50,000
New Zealand (RIANZ)	Gold	7,500
United Kingdom (BPI)	Platinum	313,200

== Release details ==
Country	Date	Label	Format	Catalog
United Kingdom	05 June 2006	RCA Records	CD	82876843432
Australia	29 July 2006	Sony BMG	CD	82876843432
