= Friday (given name) =

Friday is a given name. Notable people with the name include:

- Friday (Arapaho chief) (c. 1822–1881), Arapaho leader and interpreter
- Friday Ahunanya (born 1971), Nigerian boxer
- Friday Brown (born 1947), English singer-songwriter
- Friday Camaclang, Filipino football player
- Friday Elahor (born 1967), Nigerian former footballer
- Friday Ekpo (born 1969), Nigerian footballer
- Friday Etim (born 2002), Nigerian footballer
- Friday Hassler (1935–1972), American driver
- Friday John Imaekhai, Nigerian Anglican archbishop
- Friday Jumbe (born 1955), Malawian economist and politician
- Friday Kasteni (born 1988), Zimbabwean cricketer
- Friday Malwa (born 1952), Zambian politician
- Friday Okonofua (born 1955), Nigerian gynaecologist and educator
- Friday Osanebi (born 1980), Nigerian politician

== Fictional character ==
- Friday (Robinson Crusoe), character from Robinson Crusoe
- F.R.I.D.A.Y., one of Tony Stark's AI in the Marvel universe.

== See also ==
- Friday (surname)
- Fridayy, American rapper
