= Fryday =

Networking club

Fryday was a networking club for professionals, organising series of social and business networking events in Kyiv, Ukraine.

== Events ==
There are four types of Fryday events: Fryday Afterwork and Fryday W. Afterwork is a business-socialising event of around 500 participants on Friday evenings in downtown city venues. These events are typically held every second Friday of each month. Entrance is free of charge.

Fryday W, is held on weekdays, and has a more professional and thematical approach to networking. Themes of W events are determined by spheres of invited speakers. There are usually fewer guests at W events, around 150, who typically relate to an industry of a speaker. The entrance to Fryday W for guests is EUR 10.

Fryday Good Morning and Fryday Training were both developed during 2015.

During spring 2013 the people behind Fryday launched an affiliated website Socialite.nu, which aimed to function as a broader umbrella for business-networking. Fryday also provides networking through social media, connecting members from different cities. The network has presence on LinkedIn and Facebook, as well as a YouTube channel.

== Branches ==
The biggest Fryday community was formerly in Kyiv. The first event in Kyiv was on April 21, 2010. In September 2011 Fryday started to hold the events in Almaty (Kazakhstan), following by Tbilisi (Georgia) in January and Astana (Kazakhstan) in March 2012. As of August 2013 Fryday was holding events in 29 cities in 21 countries of Eastern Europe and Central Asia. By late 2015 Fryday was holding events in Austria, Switzerland and Sweden.
