= RCA Music Group =

Umbrella group of labels created in 2004 and merged with RCA in 2011

RCA Music Group was the BMG-owned umbrella group for RCA Records, Arista Records, LaFace Records, J Records, and Jive Records. It was established in 2004 and deactivated in 2011. Each of the labels became imprints of RCA.
