= Saturday Night (Sandi Thom song) =

Single by Sandi Thom

from the album The Pink & The Lily
- A-side: "Saturday Night"
- B-side: "N/A"
- Released: 25 August 2008 (UK)
- Recorded: 2008
- Genre: Pop, rock
- Length: 3:16 Album Version
- Label: RCA
- Songwriter(s): Duncan Thompson; Jake Field; Sandi Thom; Tom Gilbert

Sandi Thom singles chronology
"The Devil's Beat" (2008)	"Saturday Night" (2008)	"This Ol' World" (2010)

"Saturday Night" is a song performed by Scottish singer Sandi Thom. It was released as the second single of Thoms second album The Pink & The Lily and her fifth single overall. The song was named as "Single of the Week" by Radio 2 and received extensive airplay on the station. It was released on 25 August 2008. It is a download release for the UK market only. A planned CD single format release was abandoned. Despite numerous promotional appearances on television, radio and press interviews the single failed to enter the UK Top 100 on its release.

== Story Behind The Song ==
Thom said inspiration for the song came from a conversation with her manager telling her that she could not go out partying every night whilst on tour because she had to be more professional and that the original lyrics for Saturday Night, mentioned drugs, but her record company insisted they were changed before release,

== Music video ==
There was no official music video produced. She created a homemade video for the song. A version of this video featuring fan photographs was mounted by Sandi's management on her official YouTube channel but it was removed by YouTube because it contained scenes of an offensive and law-breaking nature. It has been suggested by some that this video was deliberately created to stir up controversy as a publicity stunt for the single.
