= Dave Schramm (musician) =

American musician

Dave Schramm is an American musician best known for his stint as the lead guitarist for Yo La Tengo during the band's early years.

Schramm was born and raised on Long Island, New York. After learning to play several instruments from the age of eight, Schramm picked up the guitar in his teenage years. He began his music career with a late incarnation of Human Switchboard, a short-lived group heavily influenced by The Velvet Underground and Joy Division. Although Schramm was not around early enough to be involved in the band's only LP, he did contribute to the album After Words, a solo album by Switchboard lead singer Bob Pfeifer released in 1987, five years after the band's breakup. Following Human Switchboard's breakup, Schramm played briefly with Jon Klages, formerly of The Individuals. Soon after that, Schramm joined fledgling band Yo La Tengo, serving as the band's lead guitarist for a period of approximately two years. During this span, he contributed to their debut recording "The River of Water" and the band's highly acclaimed first LP, Ride the Tiger.

Following Ride the Tiger, Schramm amicably left Yo La Tengo to form the Schramms with a number of musicians he had previously been connected to - Ron Metz, who had played drums in Human Switchboard, and former Yo La Tengo members Mike Lewis (bass) and Terry Karydes, who initially played bass until her bass guitar was stolen, after which she moved to keyboards. The band also had guitarist Todd Novak and saxophonist Pete Linzell. The Schramms released their debut album Walk to Delphi in 1989, and gained a following in Germany.

In 1990, Schramm briefly worked with Yo La Tengo again, this time contributing to their album Fakebook. Meanwhile, he continued writing songs with the Schramms, and after being signed to European label Normal Records, the band released its second album, Rock, Paper, Scissors, Dynamite in 1992.

Around this time, much of the original lineup had left the band, and a more-or-less new version of the Schramms released two albums in the mid-1990s: 1994's Little Apocalypse and 1996's Dizzy Spell. In 2000, the Schramms released their most recent record, 100 Questions, again with a different lineup than the previous album. Schramm has also released two solo albums: 1994's Folk und die Folgen (only released in Germany), and 1999's Hammer and Nails. He has worked on three albums by singer/songwriter Kate Jacobs, and has done session guitar and lap steel work for many artists, including The Replacements, Soul Asylum, Freedy Johnston, Richard Buckner, and Chris Stamey - whom he had worked with previously as a member of The dB's in the 1980s. He plays in Syd Straw's band at her annual Valentine's Day 'Heartwreck' shows.

In 2015, he once again reunited with Yo La Tengo for their album Stuff Like That There and subsequent tour.

Schramm lives in Hoboken, New Jersey.
