= Stuff Like That There =

Stuff Like That There may refer to:

- Stuff Like That There (song), a song performed by The King Sisters in the 1945 film On Stage Everybody
- Stuff Like That There (album), a 2015 album by Yo La Tengo
