= This Stupid World tour =

2023 concert tour by Yo La Tengo

- Promotional tour by Yo La Tengo
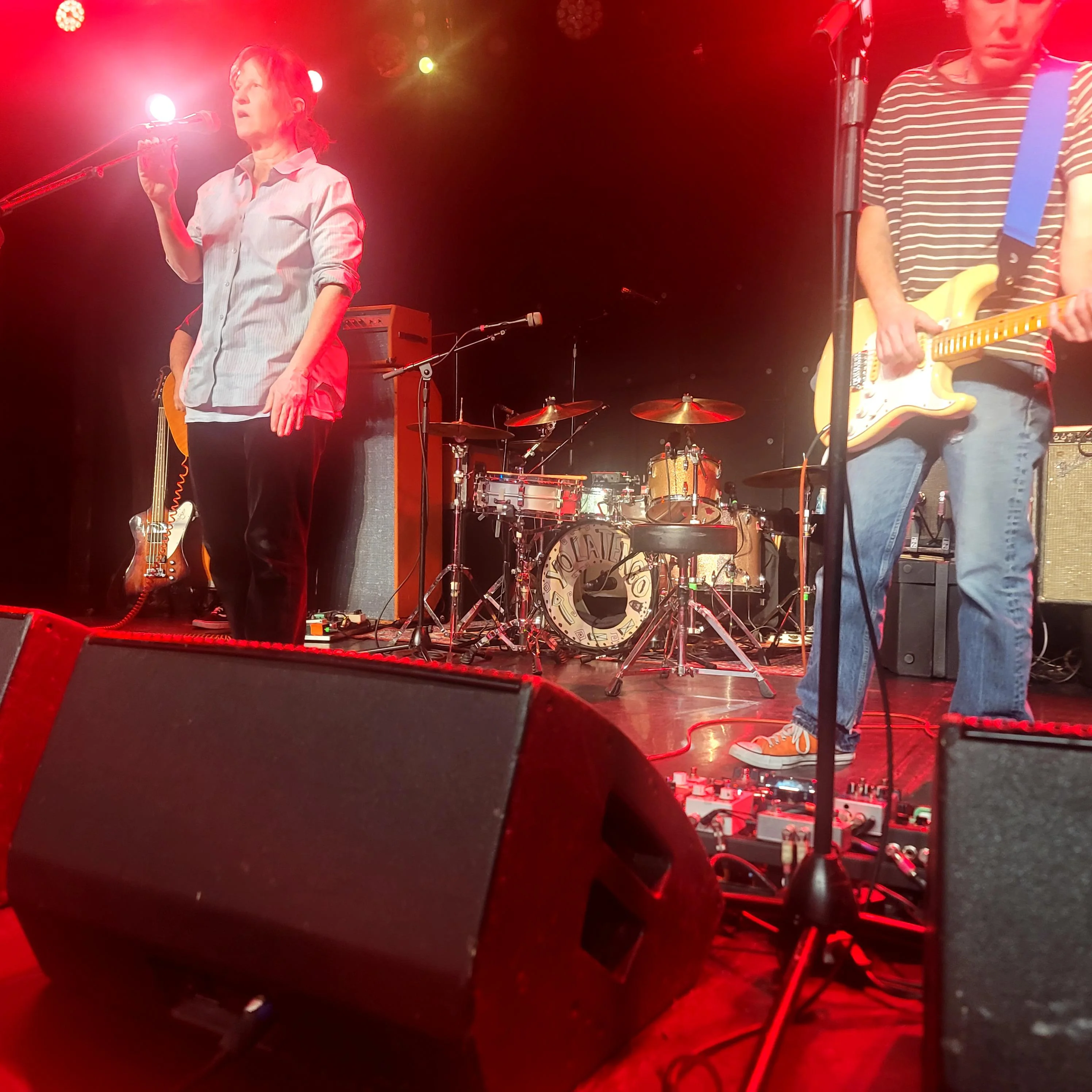
- Yo La Tengo at the Teragram Ballroom on February 26, 2023
- Location: Europe; Japan; North America
- Associated album: This Stupid World
- Start date: February 15, 2023
- End date: September 30, 2023
- Legs: 3
- No. of shows: 78
- Website: Official website

The This Stupid World tour is a 2023 concert tour by American indie rock band Yo La Tengo in support of their studio album This Stupid World. The tour has received positive reviews from critics and has taken the band across the world, playing mostly domestic dates, but also several Asian and European gigs, particularly on the festival circuit. The five-song EP The Bunker Sessions was recorded live on this tour and released on November 8, 2023.

== Announcement and structure ==
Yo La Tengo announced a tour of the United States and Europe from February to May 2023 to promote This Stupid World in January 2023. In April, the band announced a second leg of dates, followed by a third in June 2023.

The tour included many songs from the album, alongside older Yo La Tengo songs and the band's signature mix of cover versions. Set lists changed every night and shows were broken up between quieter initial sets and louder rock sets, with an intermission in between. The tour did not feature opening acts, but the final Los Angeles date included a surprise appearance by Mike Belitsky and Travis Good of The Sadies, a Chicago performance featured Wilco for four covers, Alan Sparhawk joined on keyboards at a Minneapolis gig, and Glenn Mercer guested to perform Tom Verlaine songs in Jersey City. At the March 13, 2023 show, the band cross-dressed to protest Tennessee Senate Bill 3. On February 8, 2024, the Sun Ra Arkestra joined the band to play a cover of "New Speedway Boogie". They played an additional promotional performance for a Live On KEXP set at Seattle radio station KEXP.

In August 2023, the band announced that dates for the following month would be rescheduled so drummer and vocalist Georgia Hubley could have knee surgery.

== Reception ==
Several performances have been positively reviewed by critics. Paige Walter of WXPN called the two sets performed at Union Transfer in Philadelphia "breathtaking", leaving the crowd "breathless" due to the first set list and noting that the second set was different enough to sound like a new band had come onstage. In Variety, William Earl reviewed the band's Brooklyn Steel performance, noting that "their improvisational spark seems to burn brighter with each tour" and praising each performer's musicianship. Piet Levy of The Milwaukee Journal Sentinel called the band's Milwaukee show "one-of-a-kind" for the diverse sounds that the band manages onstage and for Kaplan surprising the audience by passing around his guitar for them to play, and in the Shepherd Express, Blaine Schultz noted that "there was no shortage of deep cuts and nods to influences", calling attention to the band's deep roster of covers. At Racket, Keith Harris gave an extensive review of the Minneapolis performance, noting that the band had retained their vitality for decades and that "each show now takes on the air of a special event". The Pittsburgh performance was critiqued by Scott Tady for The Beaver County Times, calling it "a bob and sway and let the music wash over your experience" that had perfect sound. In The Detroit News, Samin Hassan called the Majestic Theatre performance "timeless" and "an intimate experience".

== Tour dates ==
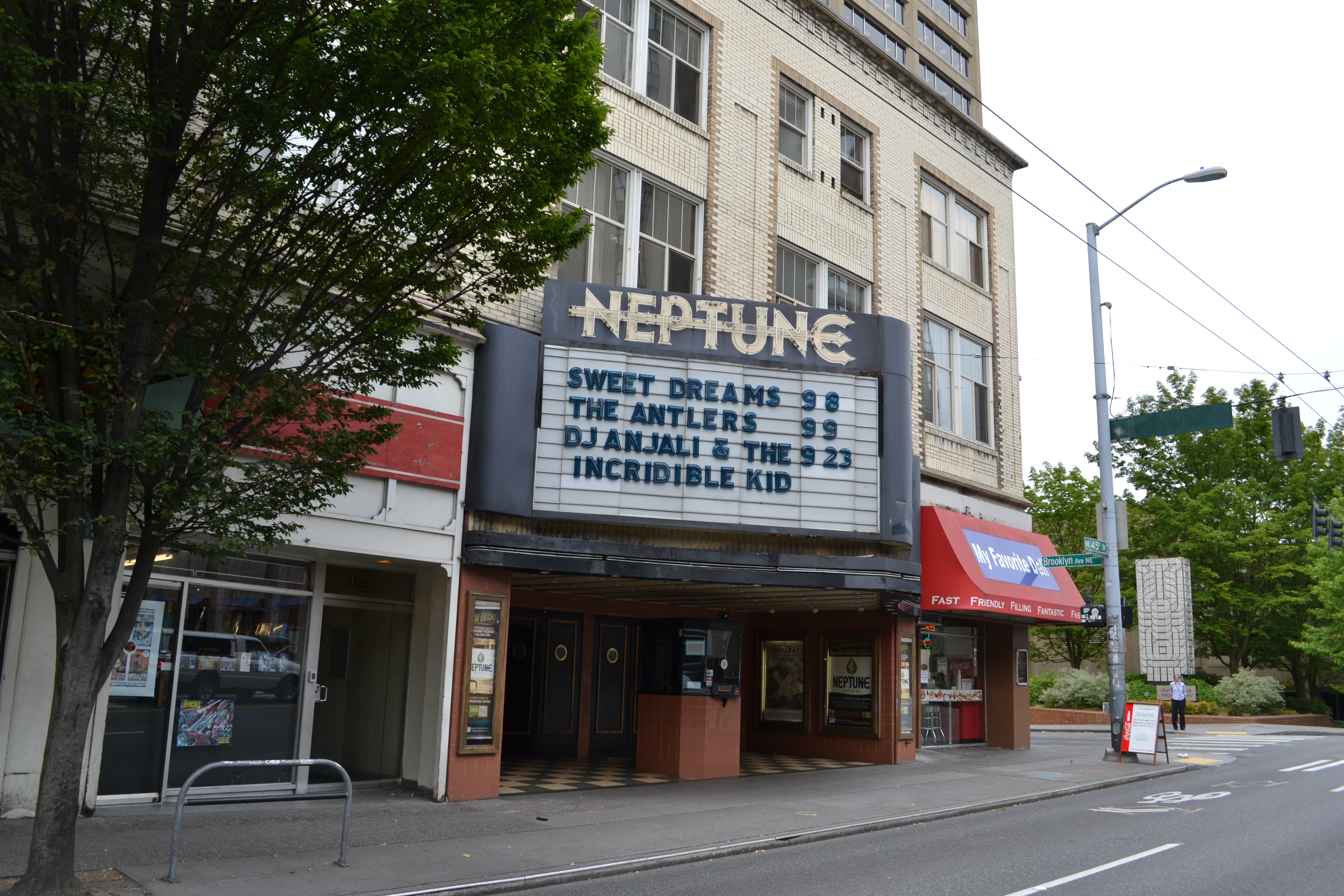
The tour to promote This Stupid World kicked off at Seattle's Neptune Theatre

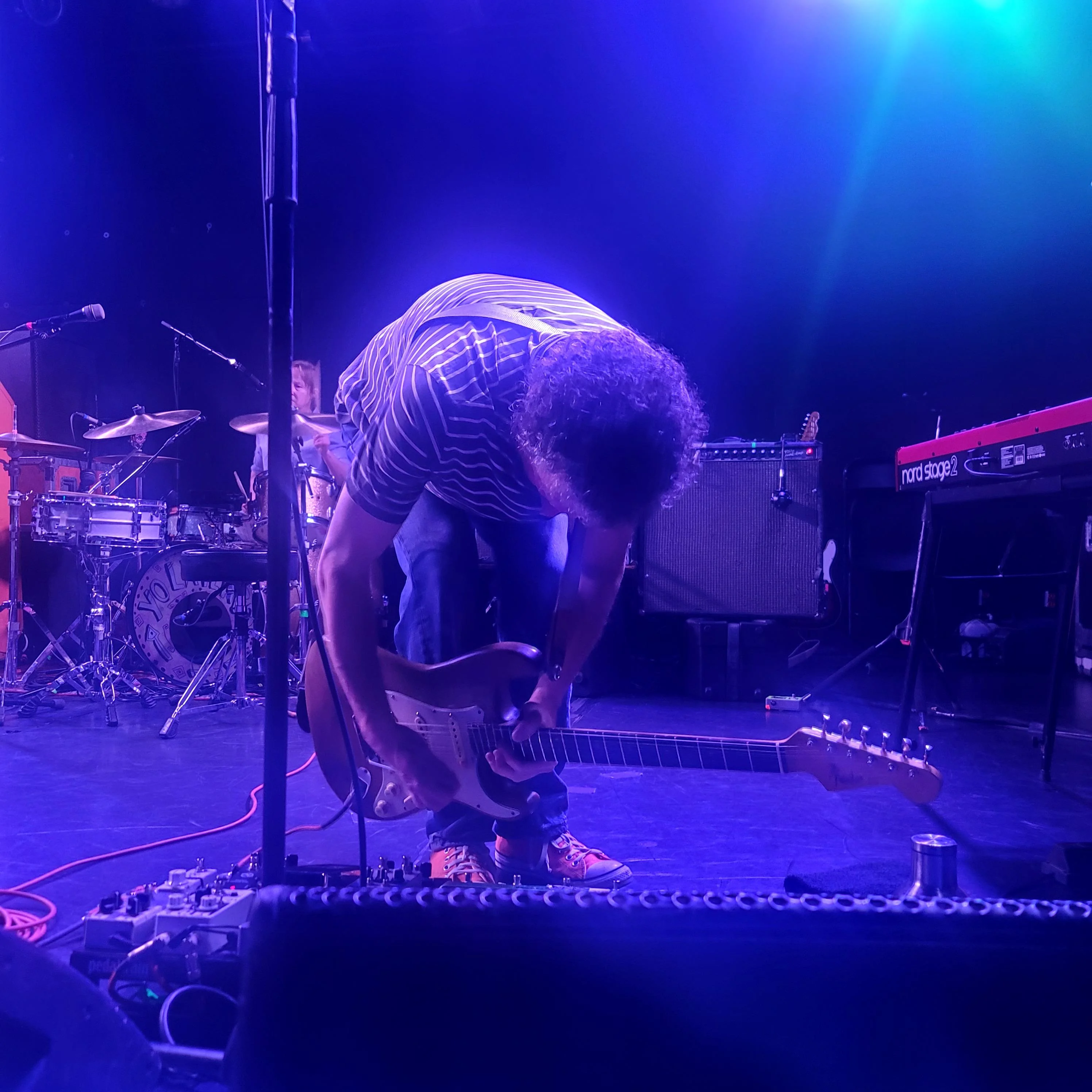
Ira Kaplan onstage at a Los Angeles show

List of 2023 concerts
Date	City	Country	Venue
February 15, 2023	Seattle	United States	Neptune Theatre
February 16, 2023	Seattle	United States	Neptune Theatre
February 17, 2023	Bellingham	United States	Neptune Theatre
February 19, 2023	Portland	United States	Wonder Ballroom
February 20, 2023	Portland	United States	Wonder Ballroom
February 22, 2023	San Francisco	United States	The Fillmore
February 24, 2023	San Francisco	United States	The Fillmore
February 25, 2023	Los Angeles	United States	Teragram Ballroom
February 26, 2023	Los Angeles	United States	Teragram Ballroom
February 27, 2023	Los Angeles	United States	Teragram Ballroom
March 9, 2023	Carrboro	United States	Cat's Cradle
March 10, 2023	Carrboro	United States	Cat's Cradle
March 11, 2023	Asheville	United States	The Orange Peel
March 13, 2023	Nashville	United States	The Basement East
March 14, 2023	Nashville	United States	The Basement East
March 16, 2023	Charlottesville	United States	Jefferson Theater
March 17, 2023	Philadelphia	United States	Union Transfer
March 18, 2023	New York City	United States	Brooklyn Steel
March 19, 2023	Washington, D.C.	United States	9:30 Club
March 21, 2023	Pittsburgh	United States	Mr Smalls
March 22, 2023	Cleveland	United States	Beachland Ballroom
March 24, 2023	Chicago	United States	Metro Chicago
March 25, 2023	Milwaukee	United States	Turner Hall Ballroom
March 26, 2023	Minneapolis	United States	Mainroom
April 10, 2023	Dublin	Ireland	3Olympia
April 12, 2023	Manchester	England	New Century Hall
April 13, 2023	Bristol	England	SWX
April 14, 2023	London	England	London Palladium
April 16, 2023	Brussels	Belgium	Ancienne Belgique
April 18, 2023	Amsterdam	Netherlands	Paradiso
April 19, 2023	Rotterdam	Netherlands	LantarenVenster
April 20, 2023	Hamburg	Germany	Uebel & Gefaehrlich
April 21, 2023	Copenhagen	Denmark	Bremen Teater
April 23, 2023	Cologne	Germany	Gloria Theatre
April 24, 2023	Prague	Czech Republic	MeetFactory
April 25, 2023	Berlin	Germany	Huxley's Neue Welt
April 26, 2023	Paris	France	La Cigale
April 29, 2023	Barcelona	Spain	Sala Apolo
April 30, 2023	Murcia	Spain	Warm Up Festival
May 2, 2023	Madrid	Spain	Warner Music the Music Station Príncipe Pío
May 3, 2023	Bilbao	Spain	Santana 27
June 9, 2023	Jersey City	United States	White Eagle Hall
June 10, 2023	Washington, D.C.	United States	The Atlantis
June 13, 2023	Portland	United States	State Theatre
June 14, 2023	South Deerfield	United States	Tree House Brewing Company
June 15, 2023	Montreal	Canada	Corona Theatre
June 16, 2023	Toronto	Canada	Phoenix Concert Theatre
June 18, 2023	Boston	United States	Paradise Rock Club
June 19, 2023	Boston	United States	Paradise Rock Club
June 21, 2023	Homer	United States	Center for the Arts
June 22, 2023	Detroit	United States	Majestic Theatre
June 23, 2023	Kalamazoo	United States	Bell's Beer Garden
June 24, 2023	Chicago	United States	Metro
June 26, 2023	Knoxville	United States	Bijou Theatre
June 27, 2023	Birmingham	United States	Saturn
June 28, 2023	Atlanta	United States	Variety Playhouse
July 28, 2023	Yuzawa	Japan	Fuji Rock Festival
August 11, 2023	Gothenburg	Sweden	Way Out West Festival
August 12, 2023	Oslo	Norway	Oya Festival
August 16, 2023	Paredes de Coura	Portugal	Paredes de Coura Festival
August 18, 2023	Saint-Malo	France	La Route du Rock
September 8, 2023	Charleston	United States	Music Farm
September 9, 2023	St. Augustine	United States	The Backyard Stage
September 11, 2023	New Orleans	United States	Tipitina's
September 12, 2023	New Orleans	United States	Tipitina's
September 14, 2023	Houston	United States	The Heights Theater
September 15, 2023	Austin	United States	Mohawk
September 16, 2023	Austin	United States	Mohawk
September 17, 2023	Dallas	United States	Longhorn
September 19, 2023	Wichita	United States	Wave
September 20, 2023	Omaha	United States	The Waiting Room
September 22, 2023	Fort Collins	United States	Washington's
September 23, 2023	Boulder	United States	Boulder Theater
September 25, 2023	Santa Fe	United States	Meow Wolf
September 27, 2023	Tucson	United States	Rialto
September 28, 2023	Phoenix	United States	Crescent Ballroom
September 29, 2023	Los Angeles	United States	Bellwether
September 30, 2023	Solana Beach	United States	Belly Up

The band were also added to the line-up of All Points East 2024, in August of that year.

== The Bunker Sessions ==
The Bunker Sessions

Live album EP by Yo La Tengo
- Released: November 8, 2023
- Recorded: 2023
- Studio: Bunker Studio, Brooklyn, New York City, New York, US
- Genre: Indie rock
- Length: 25:34

Yo La Tengo chronology
This Stupid World (2023)	The Bunker Sessions (2023)

The Bunker Sessions is a 2023 extended play recorded on this tour.

Writing for Uproxx, Grant Sharples included this among the best indie music of the week, writing that it "reifies Yo La Tengo’s live performances for the at-home listener" and "feels like a gift".

1. "Sinatra Drive Breakdown" – 8:55
2. "Aselestine" – 3:42
3. "Fallout" – 4:25
4. "Apology Letter" – 5:39
5. "Stockholm Syndrome" – 2:53
