= What About Regret =

Studio album by Kate Jacobs
- Released: 1995
- Genre: Folk, pop
- Label: Bar/None
- Producer: Kate Jacobs, Dave Schramm, James MacMillan, Charlie Shaw, Gary Arnold

Kate Jacobs chronology
The Calm Comes After (1992)	What About Regret (1995)	A Sister EP (1996)

What About Regret, stylized as (What About Regret), is an album by the American musician Kate Jacobs, released in 1995. Jacobs promoted the album with two tours, one with a full band and one with just a bass player.

After an editor at Hyperion Books heard Jacobs perform "A Sister" on the radio, the song was adapted for an illustrated children's book.

== Production ==
The album was produced by Jacobs, Dave Schramm, James MacMillan, Charlie Shaw, and Gary Arnold. As on Jacobs's first album, Schramm played guitar and many other instruments. "3 Years in Nebraska" is about a Vietnam vet who turns to growing marijuana.

== Critical reception ==
Professional ratings
Review scores
Source	Rating
AllMusic	4/5 stars
The Indianapolis Star	4/4 stars
MusicHound Folk: The Essential Album Guide	4.5/5 stars

Stereo Review considered that, "while there's great warmth in Jacobs's songs, and a nice homemade quality, many of her offerings have an off-putting vagueness and an eccentricity-for-eccentricity's-sake quality about them." The Indianapolis Star opined that "Jacobs' voice is light and lilting, but unwavering... Musically, she's akin to Nanci Griffith and Iris DeMent, but she's no clone." The Philadelphia Inquirer determined that Schramm "decorates each tune beautifully with whatever acoustic or electric touches the songs demand."

The Chicago Tribune concluded that the "brilliant lyrics continue to detonate long after these lovely, sometimes meandering, folk-pop tunes have finished." Trouser Press wrote: "A moderately demanding emotional experience, (What About Regret) rewards careful listening with details and empathy, like a series of personal letters from close friends." The Chicago Reader thought that "Jacobs sings her airy country-tinged folk rock with a slippery warble, sliding over clearly defined melodies with a palpable shyness."

Will Hermes, in City Pages, listed the album as his fifth favorite of 1995, writing that "of all the country-rock sets this year, Jacobs's moved me the most... In a word, it was her stories—tales not of vague ennui, but of people I knew intimately"; The Star-Ledger also listed What About Regret among 1995's best albums. MusicHound Folk: The Essential Album Guide praised "some of the richest, most complex songs written during the [1990s]."

== Track listing ==
No.	Title	Length
1.	"George Says"
2.	"See the Moon"
3.	"Be Brave"
4.	"No Question"
5.	"My Old Haunts"
6.	"Oh Vagabond"
7.	"Indiana"
8.	"Love Comes and Goes"
9.	"In the Country"
10.	"3 Years in Nebraska"
11.	"Don't Watch Me Sleep"
12.	"A Sister"
13.	"Made My Bed"
