= Little Apocalypse (album) =

Studio album by the Schramms
- Released: 1994
- Label: East Side Digital
- Producers: Dave Schramm, Ron Metz, Al Greller, Gary Arnold

The Schramms chronology
| Rock, Paper, Scissors, Dynamite (1992) | Little Apocalypse (1994) | Dizzy Spell (1996) |

Little Apocalypse is an album by the American band the Schramms, released in 1994. It was the band's third album, and first to be released in the United States; their first two albums, initially released by a German label, were rereleased in the U.S. in early 1995.

The band supported the album by opening for Freedy Johnston on a North American tour; they also toured with Kate Jacobs.

== Production ==
The album was produced by Dave Schramm, Ron Metz, Al Greller, and Gary Arnold. "Side of the Road" is a cover of the Lucinda Williams song. "A Woman's Name" begins with a line from an Emily Dickinson poem.

== Critical reception ==
Professional ratings
Review scores
| Source | Rating |
|---|---|
| AllMusic | 4/5 stars |
| MusicHound Rock: The Essential Album Guide | 4.5/5 stars |

Trouser Press wrote that "a pair of instrumentals—the slide-driven 'Duck Hunting in Hell' and the acoustic 'Little American Hymn'—stand out for their stylistic variance, an attribute that doesn't flatter the rest of the album." The Chicago Reader thought that Schramm's "guitar playing soars: complex, often knotty excursions that maintain a balance between the songs' exquisite tunefulness and their tender emotional outlay."

The Hartford Courant determined that "this is about as close as it comes to country in New York City, where smart lyrics are combined with acoustic twangs that owe more to the Byrds than the Burrito Brothers." The Columbus Dispatch deemed Little Apocalypse "a country-inflected folk album featuring terrific originals." The Daily Hampshire Gazette noted the "twangy country-style vocals and fine instrumental harmonies."

AllMusic wrote that "Dave Schramm's guitar playing has, if anything, grown even more striking and inventive, confirming his status as one of America's greatest unsung guitarists." MusicHound Rock: The Essential Album Guide called "Little American Hymn" "one of the most gorgeously introspective instrumentals this side of John Hartford's 'Presbyterian Guitar'."

== Track listing ==
| No. | Title | Length |
|---|---|---|
| 1. | "Heart Not Within" |
| 2. | "Sooner or Later" |
| 3. | "Home" |
| 4. | "Side of the Road" |
| 5. | "Never Hold Heaven" |
| 6. | "Little Apocalypse" |
| 7. | "Duck Hunting in Hell" |
| 8. | "Where Were You" |
| 9. | "I Saw Him Fall" |
| 10. | "Conquerer's Song" |
| 11. | "A Woman's Name" |
| 12. | "Little American Hymn" |
