= President Yo La Tengo =

Studio album by Yo La Tengo
- Released: March 1989
- Recorded: Waterhouse; CBGB
- Genres: Indie rock, noise rock
- Length: 31:16
- Label: Coyote
- Producer: Gene Holder

Yo La Tengo chronology
New Wave Hot Dogs (1987)	President Yo La Tengo (1989)	Fakebook (1990)

Alternative cover
- Matador re-release

President Yo La Tengo is the third studio album by American indie rock band Yo La Tengo, released in 1989 by record label Coyote.

== Recording ==
President Yo La Tengo was recorded at Waterhouse studio, except for tracks 4 and 6, recorded at CBGB.

== Content ==
The album contains two new versions of instrumental vehicle "The Evil That Men Do" (previously featured on the 1986 album Ride the Tiger), including an extensive live performance. "Orange Song" is a cover of the Antietam song.

== Release ==
The CD version (released by Coyote/Twin Tone Records) included the band's previous album New Wave Hot Dogs and the A-side of the 1987 single "The Asparagus Song". It was re-released by Matador Records, in 1996.

== Reception ==
Professional ratings
Review scores
Source	Rating
AllMusic	4.5/5 stars
Chicago Tribune	3/4 stars
Daily News	2.5/4 stars
NME	7/10
The Philadelphia Inquirer	3/4 stars
Q	3/5 stars
The Rolling Stone Album Guide	4/5 stars
Select	4/5
Spin Alternative Record Guide	9/10
The Village Voice	A−

Stereogum wrote: "Featuring a number of great early Yo La Tengo compositions, President Yo La Tengo is an initiation into the creative ethic of a good band that is going to turn great".

== Track listing ==
No.	Title	Writer(s)	Length
1.	"Barnaby, Hardly Working"	Ira Kaplan, Georgia Hubley	4:35
2.	"Drug Test"	Kaplan	4:06
3.	"The Evil That Men Do (Craig's Version)"	Kaplan	2:41
4.	"Orange Song"	Tim Harris, Tara Key	3:22
5.	"Alyda"	Kaplan, Hubley	3:39
6.	"The Evil That Men Do (Pablo's Version)"	Kaplan	10:37
7.	"I Threw It All Away"	Bob Dylan	2:17

== Personnel ==
- Ira Kaplan – guitars, lead vocals, organ
- Georgia Hubley – drums, harmony vocals; bass solo (track 1)
- Gene Holder – bass (tracks 1–3, 5), guitar flourishes (track 3)
- Stephan Wichnewski – bass (tracks 4, 6, 7)
- John Baumgartner – accordion (track 7)
