= CJ Camerieri =

American musician

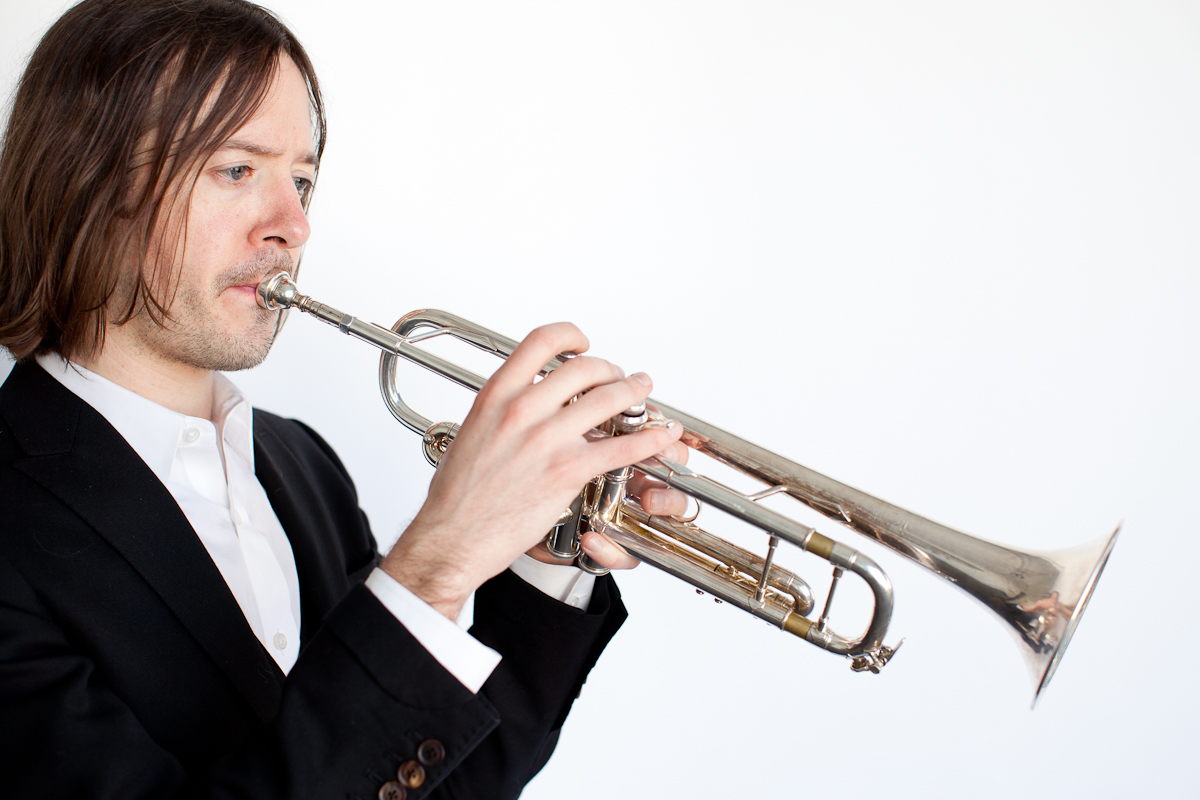

Background information
- Also known as: CARM
- Born: Carmen Jonathan Camerieri; New Jersey, United States
- Occupations: Musician; composer; arranger; producer
- Instruments: Trumpet; French horn; keyboard
- Label: 37d03d
- Website: www.cjtrumpet.com

CJ Camerieri (born in New Jersey) is a trumpet and French horn player, arranger, and producer. Camerieri is best known as the brass player for Paul Simon, Bon Iver, and the contemporary classic ensemble yMusic. His extensive discography is highlighted by two Grammy Awards for Bon Iver, Bon Iver, appearances on Paul Simon's last two records, Stranger to Stranger and In the Blue Light, and four records by yMusic including their standout premiere record which was named Classical Record of the Year by Time Out New York.

Camerieri graduated with a degree in Classical Trumpet Performance from The Juilliard School in 2004 where he was featured as a Concerto Soloist and went on to tour with Sufjan Stevens, Rufus Wainwright, The National, Sean Lennon, Belle and Sebastian, and starting yMusic in 2008.

In 2021, CJ released a solo album under the moniker CARM which features some of CJ's long-time collaborators including Justin Vernon, Sufjan Stevens and Shara Nova. It was released through the 37d03d (PEOPLE) Project. His French horn playing appears on the 2023 Yo La Tengo album This Stupid World.
