= This Stupid World =

2023 album by Yo La Tengo

Studio album by Yo La Tengo
- Released: February 10, 2023
- Recorded: March 2020; Late 2021; 2022
- Studios: Yo La Tengo studio space, Hoboken, New Jersey, United States
- Genre: Indie rock
- Length: 48:47
- Label: Matador
- Producers: Georgia Hubley; Ira Kaplan; James McNew

Yo La Tengo chronology
We Have Amnesia Sometimes (2020)	This Stupid World (2023)	The Bunker Sessions (2023)

Singles from This Stupid World
- 1. "Fallout" Released: November 2, 2022; 2. "Aselestine" Released: January 11, 2023; 3. "Sinatra Drive Breakdown" Released: February 7, 2023

This Stupid World is the seventeenth studio album by American indie rock band Yo La Tengo, released on February 10, 2023 by Matador Records. It was recorded and produced by the band in their studio space intermittently between 2020 and 2022, during the COVID-19 pandemic and represents their first effort self-producing. This Stupid World has received highly positive reviews from critics for the lyrics and musicianship, with several reviewers commenting on how strong the release is decades into the band's career. The album has been promoted with three single releases and a concert tour that took the band worldwide, including playing several festival dates.

== Recording ==
This Stupid World grew out of jam sessions that the band wrote and recorded in their Hoboken, New Jersey, studio space as part of their regular process of playing together, without the expectation of recording an album. These sessions began immediately before the COVID-19 pandemic, which caused the trio to pause recording for several months. Live performance commitments for the band were also canceled, so the musicians recorded This Stupid World until mid-March 2020 and stopped to follow COVID-19 restrictions. After performing a few live shows and their annual Hanukkah series of performances later that year, they returned to recording for this album in the last few days of 2021. The spontaneity of those holiday performances reinvigorated Yo La Tengo to return to experimenting in the studio, and unlike 2020's We Have Amnesia Sometimes, the band recorded these sessions knowing they would be put to record, with multi-track recording and overdubs. The band initially wanted to release the album as soon as possible digitally via their long-time label Matador Records, but ended up missing a July 2022 deadline for autumn release and tinkered with the recordings, pushing back release to early 2023.

The songs were written and recorded as instrumentals, with lyrics added later. While the band has typically collaborated and used outside producers, they decided that their competence in the studio and experience as musicians did not require an external record producer or mixing engineer. Bassist James McNew handled much of the recording and mixing duties, relying largely on live in-studio performance with minimal loops or overdubbing. McNew's role in recording the band had expanded over the decade prior to this album, and he reached out to fellow musician and former collaborator Jad Fair for advice on recording techniques. This is the first Yo La Tengo album to not feature an outside producer. Prior to giving the recordings to mastering engineer Greg Calbi, the only other person involved in the recordings was C. J. Camerieri, who provides French horn on two tracks. Themes and moods on the recordings came up naturally, without any particular plan for a cohesive angle or intent. The album title is similarly open to interpretation and has no single meaning.

== Release and promotion ==
Yo La Tengo announced the album in November 2022, previewing the track "Fallout". “Aselestine” (January) and “Sinatra Drive Breakdown” (February) were also shared before the album release. The band announced a tour of the United States and Europe from February to May 2023 to promote the album. In April, the band announced a second leg of dates, followed by a third in June 2023. The tour included many songs from the album, alongside older Yo La Tengo songs and the band's signature mix of cover versions. The tour has not featured opening acts, but a number of guest musicians have appeared. The five-song EP The Bunker Sessions was recorded live on this tour and released on November 8, 2023.

== Reception ==
Professional ratings
Aggregate scores
Source	Rating
AnyDecentMusic?	7.9/10
Metacritic	85/100
Review scores
Source	Rating
AllMusic	4/5 stars
Clash	8/10
The Daily Telegraph	4/5 stars
Exclaim!	8/10
Mojo	4/5 stars
MusicOMH	4.5/5 stars
Paste	8.0/10
Pitchfork	8.5/10
The Skinny	4/5 stars
Uncut	8/10

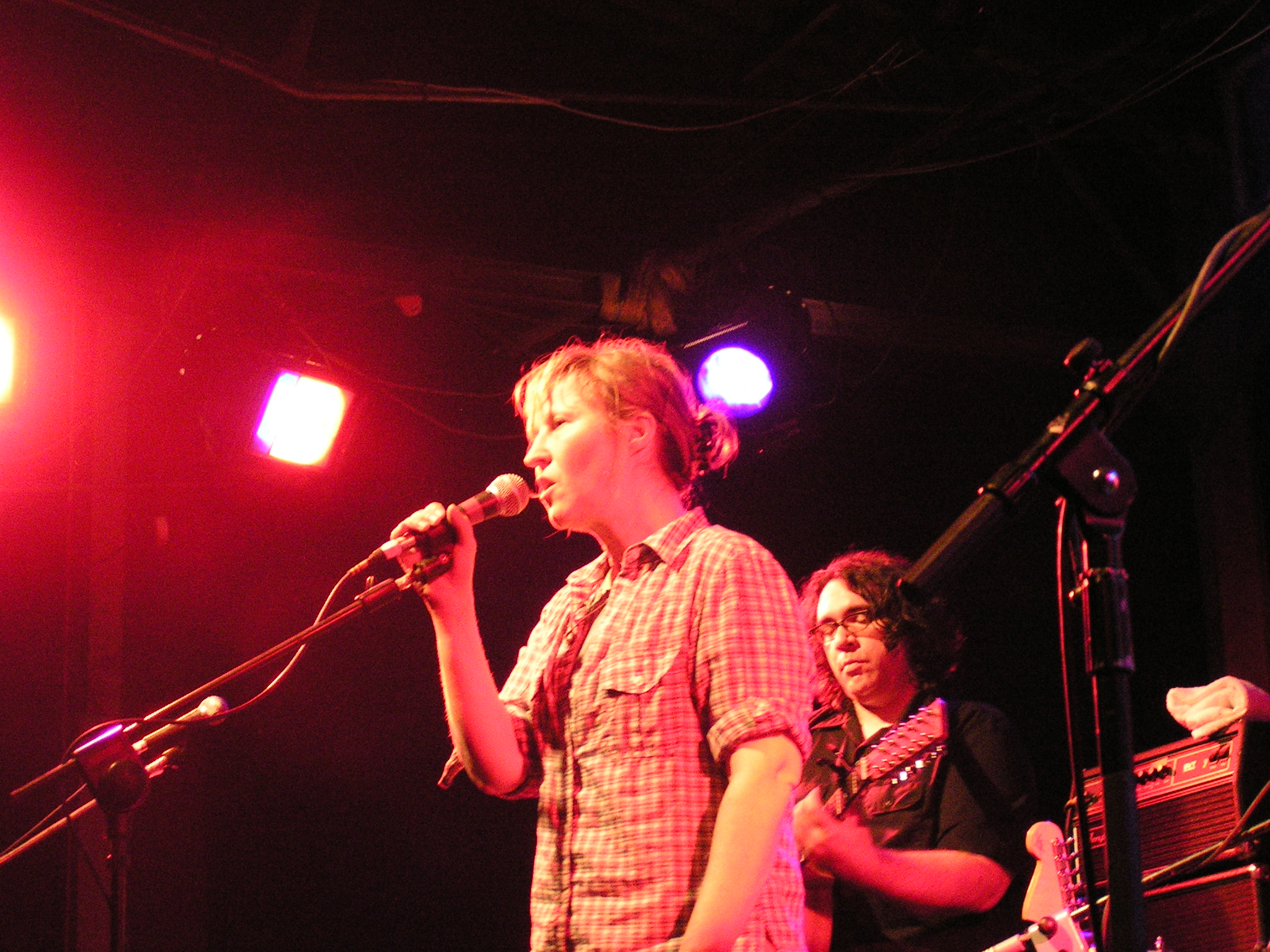
Several critics have noted the vocals of drummer Georgia Hubley (pictured in 2010) on songs from this album

This Stupid World received critical acclaim. On review aggregator Metacritic, the album has a weighted average score of 85 out of 100, based on 23 reviews, indicating "universal acclaim". The album holds a rating of 7.9 out of 10 on AnyDecentMusic?, based on 23 reviews.

Pitchfork named this release the Best New Music and reviewer Grayson Haver Currin scored it an 8.5 out of 10, calling it the band's "liveliest album in at least a decade", writing that it "feels focused and lean"; it was one of 10 albums of the week recommended by the publication. Marc Hogan of that site proposed Grammy Award picks and listed this for Grammy Award for Best Rock Album. The editors of Rolling Stone highlighted this album for its readers to listen to and critic Jon Dolan emphasized the ability of the band's lyrics and musicianship to explore dark and depressive moods. Writing for Exclaim!, Nicholas Sokic rated this album an 8 out of 10, also pointing out the longevity of the band and opining that this "is a far livelier and live-sounding album than one would expect from a group this deep into their career". For Paste, Zach Schonfeld gave This Stupid World an 8 out of 10, praising the "hermetic bubble" that the band used when recording the music, and writing that the lyrics exploring "perseverance in a stupid world is its own kind of hope"; the magazine listed it as one of the top 10 albums of the month. In a review that scored the album a 4 out of 5, Sunnyvale of Sputnik Music called it "an absolute shot in the arm" that is "an immensely satisfying listen". Writing for Glide Magazine, Mac Lockett calls this album a return to form, connecting this sound to the band's work prior to 2006, with moods of "beguiling sadness to the resultant beauty of dismissing its own urgency" and "innate energy and some of the group’s strongest songwriting in years". Michael Elliott of No Depression also highlighted "drones of noise [that] rumble" in some tracks, as well as the "haunting vocal contributions" by Georgia Hubley.

The editors of AllMusic Guide scored this album 4 out of 5 stars, with reviewer Mark Deming stating that the musicians are "still finding new ways of doing things" with "music [that] feels warmer and more emotionally satisfying" than anything they have released in over a decade. Jem Aswad of Variety calls this "their loudest and liveliest outing in years", while staying within their signature indie rock sound. Lee Zimmerman of American Songwriter gave this album 3.5 out of 5 stars for having "odd and unexpected" tracks that have "resolve and resilience" in the lyrics. For NPR's All Songs Considered, host Bob Boilen highlighted "Fallout" as a preview for the album and "Tonight's Episode" upon release; the publisher named this one of the top five albums of the week. Fader and JamBase also listed This Stupid World among the albums of the week. In Under the Radar, Michael James Hall rated the album 8.5 out of 10 stars, calling it a "triumphant stylistic return to peak form" with "a tender, tenebrous beauty". In The Jersey Journal, Jim Testa speculated that this could be the best rock album of the 2020s and that the band defines "the Hoboken sound". In The Philadelphia Inquirer, This Stupid World was the number four album of the week. Jon M. Gilbertson of The Shepherd Express characterizes this release "an intimate head trip" with songs that are "loose-limbed, if stylistically varied". In Tablet, David Meir Grossman compares this release to others across the band's career, noting how the musical sound continues a tradition of loud-and-quiet dynamics and blending the familiar with the chaotic, calling This Stupid World "one of their best albums in decades". In the Burlington County Times, Marc Masters highlights the theme of the passage of time and calls this "the most live-sounding Yo La Tengo album in a while". Writing in his And It Don't Stop blog, Robert Christgau rated this album a B+. In The Big Takeover, Jeff Elbel wrote that "the unfettered experimentation and unfiltered noise-rock suggest Sonic Youth pulled through the lo-fi filter of a less-bombastic Guided By Voices".

Steven Johnson of musicOMH scored this album 4.5 out of 5 stars, writing that they are "reverting to their signature sound, consolidating their position as alternative treasures". In The Skinny, Tony Inglis gave This Stupid World a 4 out of 5 stars, calling the music "reflective and funny" and noting that the band "continue[s] to defy" forty years into their career. Zara Hedderman of The Quietus points out the band's playfulness and sense of humor, writing that this album "sounds like a body of recordings made by the band over a fruitful and fun weekend two decades ago. You could say it’s the sonic equivalent of finding a beloved jumper you’d forgotten about or assumed missing that miraculously re-appears at the back of a dusty drawer. As soon as you step into the world created by the trio, there’s an immediate warmth and familiarity to the compositions." Mojo's Stevie Chick rated this album a 4 out of 5 stars, stating that this album "marks a gear change from Yo La Tengo’s recent records", by exploring emotionally heavy themes and noting the musicians high level of craft. In Uncut, Sam Richards also gave an 8 out of 10, emphasizing the "childlike quality" of the band members' musical experimentation deep into their careers. Theo Gorst of Loud and Quiet gave the same score as Uncut and wrote that this album eschews the restraint of the band's recent albums, with "resolution... wrought from noise". Far Out scored This Stupid World a 5 out of 5 stars, with reviewer Jordan Potter saying that it "isn't far from perfect".

For Gigwise, Charlotte Grimwade gave This Stupid World 8 out of 10 stars, stating that the album "allow[s] anxiety, acceptance and existentialism to battle it out", and has an "unsettling sense of impending doom" paired with "reassuring vocals and ... lighter tracks ... that captures abrasive uncertainty and soothing acceptance perfectly". For The Arts Desk, Guy Oddy gave This Stupid World a 3 out of 5 stars for including "mellow and woozy shades" alongside "psychedelic vibes". Calling this album "gorgeously untethered", Ed Power of The Irish Examiner rated This Stupid World a 4 out of 5 stars. Another 8 out of 10 rating came from Benjamin Graye of Clash, writing that this release is "very much in the mould of a classic Yo La Tengo album", but that they "bring more than enough energy, variety and tallent to create wonderful new songs that all sit comfortably inside this little world whilst still sounding as vibrant and into it as they did 30 years ago". Michael Hahn of The Guardian rated the album a 4 out of 5 stars, naming it "a quintessential YLT album", emphasizing the subtle interplay between sounds and moods that is created between Hubley and Ira Kaplan. The Observer gave the same score, with critic Phil Mongredien praising the mix of playful, absurdist lyrics alongside serious and introspective ones. Writing for The Daily Telegraph, Cat Woods gives another 4 out of 5 stars, assessing that the band "sound[s] as fresh and relevant now as they ever have". The Evening Standard's David Smyth rated this album a 3 out of 5 stars, cautioning new listeners, "if you’re not already invested in the band this could all come across as a shade intimidating, if it wasn’t for a couple of truly beautiful compositions" and concluding that "marvellous things can still happen" with this seasoned musical group. The British Ticketmaster named this the album of the week, with critic Mark Grassick characterizing this release as "capturing the magic of three kindred spirits playing in the moment", noting that the music never gets boring as "Yo La Tengo’s technique has captured so many spontaneous rehearsal room moments that usually vanish into the ether". In The Scotsman, Fiona Shepherd gave this album a 3 out of 5 stars, calling the music "psychedelic garage rock territory, carving meditative, timeless reflections from sprawling live jams".

Mint's Sanjoy Narayan proposed that Yo La Tengo may be "the greatest band you never heard of" and noted that this album brings to mind the band's best releases for "veering from a soft and quiet understated sound to loud, raw and noisy". Writing for The New Zealand Herald, Peter Baker calls This Stupid World "Yo La Tengo's most compelling and concise album in ages". For The Australian, Doug Wallen gave the album 3.5 out of 5 stars, stating that the end of the album drags, but "a low-key air of resignation runs throughout, though always graced with a playful twist".

As the first quarter of 2023 wrapped up, two outlets mentioned This Stupid World as among the best of the year so far: Goldmine's Peter Lindblad called the album a "mature blend of sweet, smart accessibility and soft, inventive dissonance", and for Iowa Public Radio, Mark Simmet characterized the music as "smart indie rock from a band that helped to invent the genre". For Business Insider, Barnaby Lane collated the highest scores for albums on Metacritic, with This Stupid World tying for 10th place. An April 6 unranked listing of the seven best albums of the year from Vulture included the release. Another unranked listing from BrooklynVegan included This Stupid World among the best of indie rock in the first quarter. In June 2023, the staffs of The Guardian and Spin published unranked round-ups of the best albums of the year and included this release, with the former noting that the album is a "US indie institution return to first principles", and the latter writing that "the trio is at its most vividly indispensable for the first time in quite a while". Also in June, Stereogum rated this album 13th best of the year, with Rachel Brodsky noting how the band members still have something new to say this deep into their careers. Two more lists were published on June 19: The A.V. Club included this on their 22 best albums of the first half of the year for being "more focused and energized than they have in years" and Paste ranked it fourth for mixing humor and sadness in a way that "bristles with a sense of uneasy quiet as the world outside rages and burns". On June 30, BrooklynVegan published a list of the best independent music albums of 2023 so far, for having "the jagged, fuzzy pop numbers, krautrock inspired one-chord groovers, feedback-laden slow-burn rippers, hazy shoegaze, and especially pretty songs sung by Georgia" and thoughtful lyrics. Rolling Stone's mid-year list published on June 13 also included This Stupid World and Jon Dolan wrote that it "has a mood that makes it feel distinct in the band’s esteemed catalog" In a mid-year review, Rolling Stone India included this release in their best albums of 2023. Uncut editor Michael Bonner included this album on his list of the best of the year.

This Stupid World in best-of lists
Outlet	Listing	Rank
AllMusic	AllMusic Best of 2023	—N/a
AllMusic	Favorite Alternative & Indie Albums	—N/a
BrooklynVegan	33 great 2023 albums from indie/alternative legends	—N/a
BrooklynVegan	Indie Basement: Top 40 Albums of 2023	—N/a
The Guardian	The 50 Best Albums of 2023	43
JamBase	Team JamBase’s Favorite Albums Of 2023 (Andy Kahn)	—N/a
Mojo	Mojo's Top 75 Albums of 2023	25
musicOMH	musicOMH’s Top 50 Albums Of 2023	26
El País	The best music albums of 2023	14
Paste	The 50 Best Albums of 2023	50
Paste	The 30 Best Rock Albums of 2023	—N/a
Pitchfork	The 50 Best Albums of 2023	38
Pitchfork	The 37 Best Rock Albums of 2023	—N/a
PopMatters	The 30 Best Rock Albums of 2023	22
Qobuz	The Best Albums of 2023	—N/a
Rolling Stone	The 100 Best Albums of 2023	49
Rolling Stone	The 40 Best Indie-Rock Albums of 2023	—N/a
Slant Magazine	The 50 Best Albums of 2023	38
Uncut	Uncut's Top 75 Albums of 2023	5
Under the Radar	Under the Radar's Top 100 Albums of 2023	25
The Wire	2023 Rewind: Releases of the Year 1–50	1

== Track listing ==
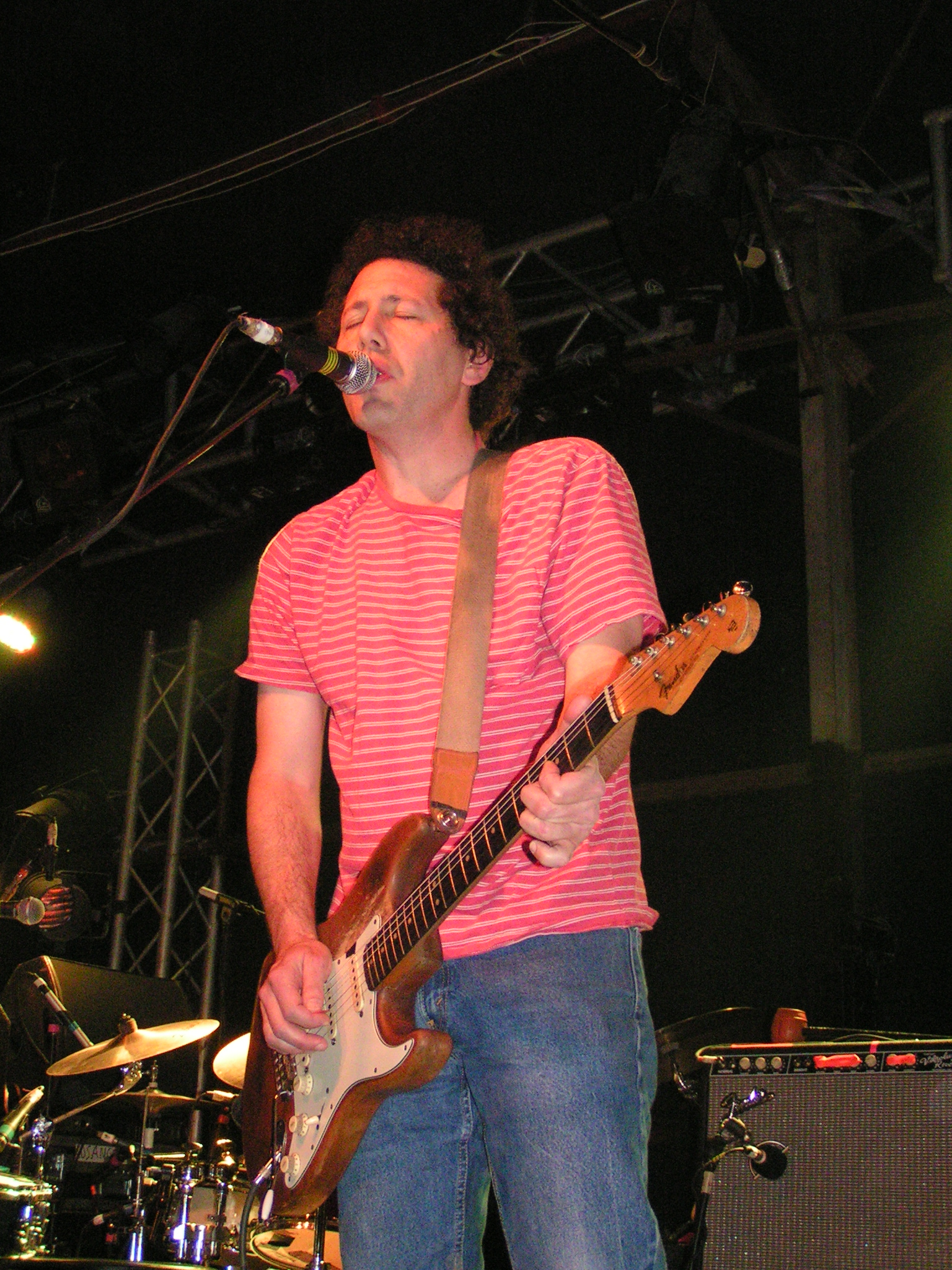
Guitarist and vocalist Ira Kaplan (pictured in 2010) wrote the album's lyrics and co-wrote all of the music

All lyrics written by Ira Kaplan and all music written by Georgia Hubley, Ira Kaplan, and James McNew

1. "Sinatra Drive Breakdown" – 7:25
2. "Fallout" – 4:36
3. "Tonight's Episode" – 4:50
4. "Aselestine" – 3:50
5. "Until It Happens" – 3:15
6. "Apology Letter" – 4:17
7. "Brain Capers" – 5:35
8. "This Stupid World" – 7:28
9. "Miles Away" – 7:30
- On the vinyl edition of the album, "Brain Capers" extends into the locked groove. The track length listed on the record itself is marked as ∞.

== Personnel ==
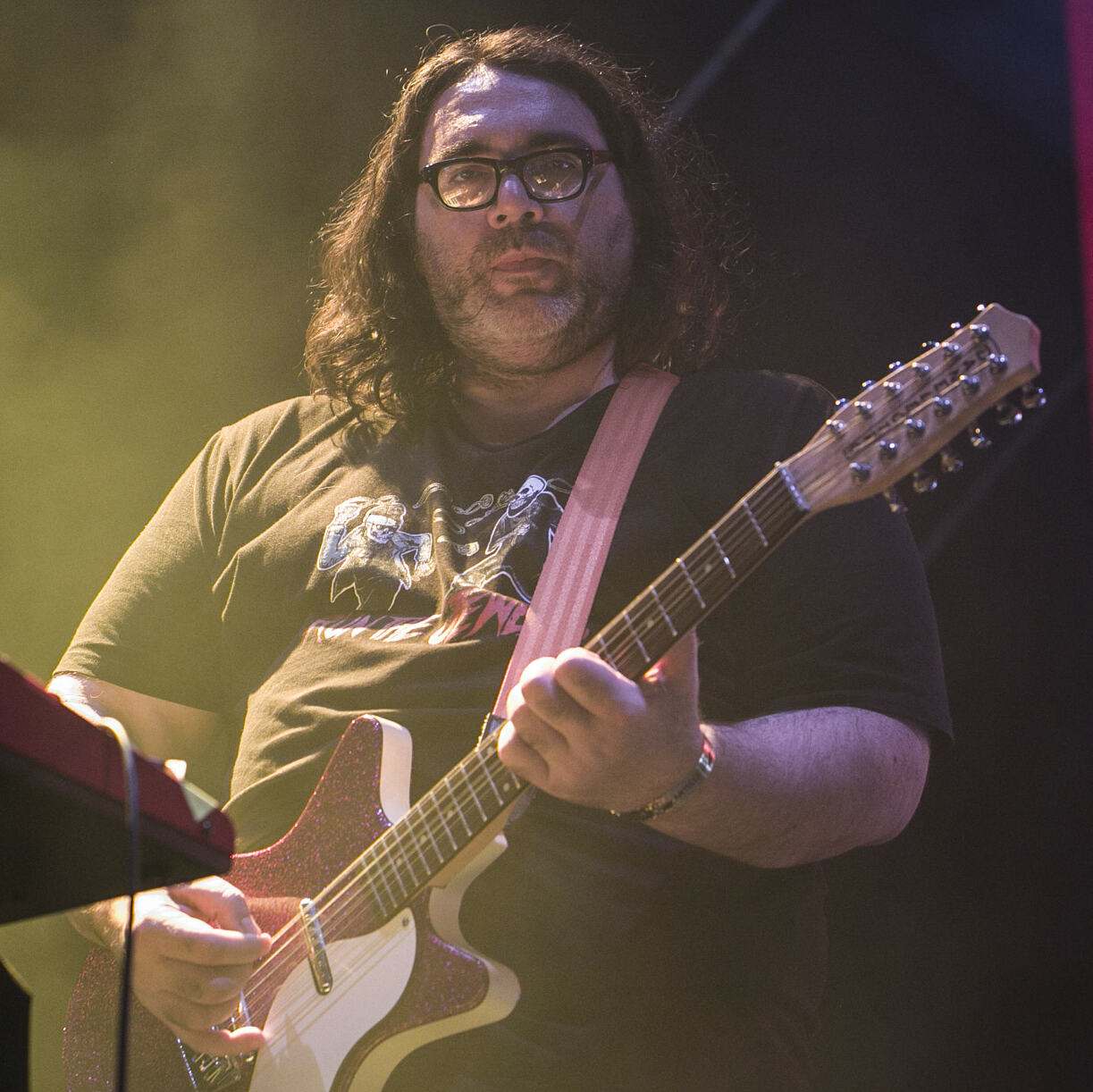
Yo La Tengo relied on the band members to produce and record the sessions for This Stupid World, led by bassist James McNew (pictured in 2017)

Yo La Tengo

- Georgia Hubley – drums, vocals, production
- Ira Kaplan – guitar, vocals, production
- James McNew – bass guitar, vocals, engineering, mixing, production

Additional personnel

- Greg Calbi – mastering at Sterling Sound, Edgewater, New Jersey, United States
- C. J. Camerieri – French horn on "Aselestine" and "Apology Letter"
- David Godlis – photography
- Mark Ohe – design

== Chart performance ==
This Stupid World was the highest-charting album from Yo La Tengo in the United States, debuting at eighth place on the Billboard Top Album Sales chart, selling 6,000 units in its first week.

Chart performance for This Stupid World
Chart (2023)	Peak
Belgian Albums (Ultratop Flanders)	69
Belgian Albums (Ultratop Wallonia)	106
French Albums (SNEP)	188
German Albums (Offizielle Top 100)	18
Portuguese Album Chart	20
Scottish Albums (Official Charts)	12
Spanish Albums (Promusicae)	41
Swiss Albums (Schweizer Hitparade)	35
UK Album Downloads (Official Charts)	21
UK Independent Albums (Official Charts)	8
US Top Albums Sales (Billboard)	8

== Release history ==
This Stupid World release formats and history
Region	Date	Label	Format	Catalog	Notes
Europe, North America	February 10, 2023	Matador	vinyl LP (double album)	OLE-1929-LP	Standard black vinyl
Europe, North America	February 10, 2023	Matador	vinyl LP (double album)	OLE1929LPE	Limited edition blue vinyl
Japan	February 10, 2023	Matador	vinyl LP (double album)	OLE1929LPE	Limited edition yellow vinyl with obi strip
Europe, North America	February 10, 2023	Matador	compact disc	OLE 1929CD	
Worldwide	February 10, 2023	Matador	music download	—N/a	Available platforms include Apple Music, Bandcamp, and Bleep
Worldwide	February 10, 2023	Matador	streaming music	—N/a	Available platforms include Deezer, Napster, Pandora, Qobuz, SoundCloud, Spotify, Tidal, and YouTube Music

== See also ==
- 2023 in American music
- List of 2023 albums
