= We Have Amnesia Sometimes =

Studio album by Yo La Tengo
- Released: July 17, 2020
- Recorded: April 2020
- Studios: Rehearsal space, Hoboken, New Jersey
- Genres: Drone; ambient
- Length: 37:16
- Label: Matador

Yo La Tengo chronology
There's a Riot Going On (2018)	We Have Amnesia Sometimes (2020)	This Stupid World (2023)

Professional ratings
Aggregate scores
Source	Rating
Metacritic	79/100
Review scores
Source	Rating
Paste	8.0/10
Pitchfork	6.2/10

We Have Amnesia Sometimes is the sixteenth studio album by Yo La Tengo, released on July 17, 2020.

== Background ==
The album consists of five tracks recorded during the COVID-19 pandemic. The songs were recorded by the band placing a single mic in the center of their rehearsal space. The improvised songs are reminiscent of ambient music, with slowly moving, droning sounds.

The digital version of the album includes recolored versions of the main cover art attached to each track.

== Reception ==
The album has received mostly favorable reviews. On review aggregator website Metacritic, the album has a score of 79, indicating generally favorable reviews.

== Track listing ==
All songs written by Yo La Tengo.

No.	Title	Length
1.	"James and Ira demonstrate mysticism and some confusion holds (Monday)"	5:42
2.	"Georgia thinks it's probably okay (Tuesday)"	7:33
3.	"James gets up and watches mourning birds with Abraham (Wednesday)"	6:20
4.	"Georgia considers the two blue ones (Thursday)"	8:16
5.	"Ira searches for the slide, sort of (Friday)"	9:25
Total length:		37:16
