= There's a Riot Going On =

Studio album by Yo La Tengo
- Released: March 16, 2018
- Genre: Indie rock
- Length: 63:30
- Label: Matador
- Producer: Yo La Tengo

Yo La Tengo chronology
Murder in the Second Degree (2016)	There's a Riot Going On (2018)	We Have Amnesia Sometimes (2020)

Professional ratings
Aggregate scores
Source	Rating
AnyDecentMusic?	7.4/10
Metacritic	77/100
Review scores
Source	Rating
AllMusic	3.5/5 stars
The A.V. Club	B+
The Guardian	4/5 stars
Mojo	4/5 stars
The Observer	3/5 stars
Pitchfork	7.6/10
Q	4/5 stars
The Times	4/5 stars
Uncut	8/10
Vice	A−

There's a Riot Going On is the fifteenth studio album by the American band Yo La Tengo, and was released through Matador Records on March 16, 2018.

There's a Riot Going On was ranked the 41st best release of the year in The Wire magazine's annual critics' poll.

The title of the album is derived from the 1971 Sly and the Family Stone album There's a Riot Goin' On.

== Track listing ==
All tracks are written by Yo La Tengo except "Polynesia #1" by Michael Hurley.

No.	Title	Vocals	Length
1.	"You Are Here"		5:44
2.	"Shades of Blue"	Hubley	2:50
3.	"She May, She Might"	Kaplan	5:22
4.	"For You Too"	Kaplan	4:12
5.	"Ashes"	Hubley	3:34
6.	"Polynesia #1"	Hubley	2:26
7.	"Dream Dream Away"	McNew	5:50
8.	"Shortwave"		5:44
9.	"Above the Sound"	Kaplan; McNew	5:40
10.	"Let's Do It Wrong"	Kaplan; Hubley	3:34
11.	"What Chance Have I Got"	Hubley	3:06
12.	"Esportes Casual"		1:26
13.	"Forever"	Kaplan; McNew	4:20
14.	"Out of the Pool"	Kaplan	2:46
15.	"Here You Are"	Kaplan; Hubley; McNew	6:56
Total length:			63:30

== Charts ==
Chart (2018)	Peak position
Belgian Albums (Ultratop Flanders)	178
German Albums (Offizielle Top 100)	63
Scottish Albums (Official Charts)	21
Spanish Albums (PROMUSICAE)	56
Swiss Albums (Schweizer Hitparade)	47
UK Albums (Official Charts)	60
US Billboard 200	136
US Top Alternative Albums (Billboard)	11
US Top Rock Albums (Billboard)	25
