= Murder in the Second Degree =

Compilation album by Yo La Tengo
- Released: 2016
- Recorded: WFMU studios
- Genre: Indie rock
- Length: 76:36

Yo La Tengo chronology
Stuff Like That There (2015)	Murder in the Second Degree (2016)	There's a Riot Going On (2018)

Murder in the Second Degree is a 2016 album by the American musical group Yo La Tengo. The album consists of cover songs originally written by other musicians, all of which were played live in the studio by Yo La Tengo as fundraisers for independent radio station WFMU. It is a follow-up to their 2006 compilation album, Yo La Tengo Is Murdering the Classics.

The album cover was created by cartoonist Adrian Tomine, who did the cover of the previous compilation album as well.

== Track listing ==
No.	Title	Writer(s)	Length
1.	"Alley Cat"	Frank Björn	1:12
2.	"New York Groove"	Russ Ballard	2:48
3.	"Bertha"	Jerry Garcia, Robert Hunter	3:13
4.	"Add It Up"	Gordon Gano	2:50
5.	"To Love Somebody"	Barry Gibb, Robin Gibb	2:52
6.	"Civilization (Bongo Bongo Bongo)"	Bob Hilliard, Carl Sigman	0:35
7.	"Suspect Device"	Jake Burns	1:52
8.	"First I Look At The Purse"	Smokey Robinson, Bobby Rogers	2:20
9.	"Jailbreak"	Phil Lynott	3:02
10.	"Popcorn"	Gershon Kingsley	1:35
11.	"Girl from the North Country"	Bob Dylan	2:01
12.	"Build Me Up Buttercup"	Mike d'Abo, Tony Macaulay	3:05
13.	"I Wanna Be Free"	Tommy Boyce, Bobby Hart	2:04
14.	"Rock and Roll Love Letter"	Tim Moore	2:54
15.	"Emotional Rescue"	Mick Jagger, Keith Richards	1:40
16.	"Some Velvet Morning"	Lee Hazlewood	2:27
17.	"The Low Spark Of High Heeled Boys/Mr. Soul"	Steve Winwood, Jim Capaldi/Neil Young	4:54
18.	"Pay to Cum"	Dr. Know, Paul Hudson, Darryl Jenifer, Earl Hudson	1:36
19.	"Never My Love"	Don Addrisi, Dick Addrisi	1:49
20.	"King Kong"	Ray Davies	3:12
21.	"White Lines (Don't Don't Do It)"	Melle Mel, Sylvia Robinson	2:06
22.	"Slurf Song"	Michael Hurley	1:56
23.	"Different Drum"	Mike Nesmith	3:17
24.	"Crazy"	Willie Nelson	1:00
25.	"Be My Baby"	Phil Spector, Jeff Barry, Ellie Greenwich	3:21
26.	"Hey Ya!"	André 3000	3:02
27.	"Heart of Darkness"	David Thomas, Scott Krauss, Tim Wright, Peter Laughner, Tom Herman	5:07
28.	"Chantilly Lace/Medley": Chantilly Lace (J.P.Robinson); Waterloo Sunset (Ray Davies); Yo Yo Bye Bye (Yoni Wolf); Fame (David Bowie, Carlos Alomar, John Lennon); Another One Bites the Dust (John Deacon); Afternoon Delight (Bill Danoff); At Last I Am Free (Bernard Edwards, Nile Rodgers); Now You Know You're Black (Dennis Flemion, Jimmy Flemion); Girl Don't Tell Me (Brian Wilson); I'll Never Fall in Love Again (Burt Bacharach, Hal David); I'll Keep It with Mine (Bob Dylan); Plea for Tenderness (Jonathan Richman); Ode to Billie Joe (Bobbie Gentry); MacArthur Park (Jimmy Webb); Tattooed Love Boys (Chrissie Hynde); The Tra La La Song (One Banana, Two Banana) (Mark Barkan, Ritchie Adams); Boogie Wonderland (Allee Willis, Jon Lind); Ain't That Nothing (Tom Verlaine); The Star-Spangled Banner (Francis Scott Key)"		8:46
