= Fakebook (album) =

Studio album by Yo La Tengo
- Released: July 1990
- Studios: Water Music in Hoboken, United States
- Genres: Indie rock; folk
- Length: 42:24
- Label: Bar/None
- Producer: Gene Holder

Yo La Tengo chronology
President Yo La Tengo (1989)	Fakebook (1990)	May I Sing with Me (1992)

Singles from Fakebook
- 1. "Speeding Motorcycle" Released: 1990

Professional ratings
Review scores
Source	Rating
AllMusic	4.5/5 stars
The Encyclopedia of Popular Music	3/5 stars
Entertainment Weekly	A−
Melody Maker	3.5/5 stars
(The New) Rolling Stone Album Guide	4/5 stars
Select	4/5
Spin Alternative Record Guide	8/10

Fakebook is the fourth studio album by American indie rock band Yo La Tengo, released in 1990 by record label Bar None.

== Content ==
Comprising eleven cover songs as well as five originals, this album is regarded as a departure from their previous albums due to it containing mostly folk songs. "Barnaby, Hardly Working" is a new version of the song featured in the previous album President Yo La Tengo. "Did I Tell You" is a new version of the song featured in the 1987 album New Wave Hot Dogs.

== Track listing ==
No.	Title	Writer(s)	Length
1.	"Can't Forget"	Ira Kaplan	2:13
2.	"Griselda"	Antonia	1:54
3.	"Here Comes My Baby"	Cat Stevens	2:26
4.	"Barnaby, Hardly Working"	Georgia Hubley, Kaplan	4:12
5.	"Yellow Sarong"	(Originally by The Scene Is Now)	1:37
6.	"You Tore Me Down"	(Originally by Flamin' Groovies)	2:54
7.	"Emulsified"	(Originally by Rex Garvin & The Mighty Cravers)	2:46
8.	"Speeding Motorcycle"	Daniel Johnston	3:16
9.	"Tried So Hard"	Gene Clark	2:13
10.	"The Summer"	Hubley, Kaplan	2:40
11.	"Oklahoma, U.S.A."	Ray Davies	2:18
12.	"What Comes Next"	Kaplan	3:11
13.	"The One to Cry"	(Originally by The Escorts)	1:47
14.	"Andalucia"	John Cale	3:33
15.	"Did I Tell You"	Kaplan	3:21
16.	"What Can I Say"	Joey Spampinato	2:03

== Personnel ==
- Ira Kaplan – vocals, acoustic guitar; electric guitar (tracks 6, 7, 12)
- Dave Schramm – electric guitar, steel guitar, organ
- Al Greller – double bass
- Georgia Hubley – drums, vocals; organ (tracks 11, 14), electric guitar (track 8)

Additional Personnel

- The Pussywillows – vocals (track 7)
- Gene Holder – electric bass (track 10)
- Peter Stampfel – violin and vocals (track 13)
