= Ride the Tiger (album) =

Studio album by Yo La Tengo
- Released: January 1986
- Recorded: December 1985 in Boston, United States
- Genres: Folk rock; jangle pop
- Length: 38:06
- Label: Coyote
- Producer: Clint Conley

Yo La Tengo chronology
Ride the Tiger (1986)	New Wave Hot Dogs (1987)

Professional ratings
Review scores
Source	Rating
AllMusic	4/5 stars
The Encyclopedia of Popular Music	3/5 stars
MusicHound Rock: The Essential Album Guide	3.5/5 stars
The New Rolling Stone Album Guide	2/5 stars
Q	4/5 stars
Spin Alternative Record Guide	4/10

Ride the Tiger is the debut studio album by American indie rock band Yo La Tengo. It was released in 1986 by record label Coyote.

== Production ==
The album was produced by Mission of Burma's Clint Conley. Dave Schramm plays guitar on the album.

== Content ==
The song "Big Sky" is a cover of The Kinks' song from their album The Kinks Are the Village Green Preservation Society. The song "A House Is Not a Motel" is a cover of Love's song from their album Forever Changes.

== Critical reception ==
The Washington Post called the album "unpretentious and emotionally convincing," writing that the band's "chief asset is not [Ira] Kaplan's flat, intimate vocals, but their guitars, which are finely textured and finely tuned to the moody, personal resonances of their songs." Trouser Press wrote that "it’s originals like 'The Cone of Silence' and 'The Forest Green' that make Ride the Tiger such a pleasure."

== Track listing ==
All tracks are written by Ira Kaplan, except where noted.

No.	Title	Writer(s)	Length
1.	"The Cone of Silence"		2:49
2.	"Big Sky"	Ray Davies	2:46
3.	"The Evil That Men Do"		4:11
4.	"The Forest Green"	Kaplan, Georgia Hubley	3:23
5.	"The Pain of Pain"		5:35
6.	"The Way Some People Die"	Dave Schramm	3:37
7.	"The Empty Pool"	Dave Weckerman	2:21
8.	"Alrock's Bells"		4:08
9.	"Five Years"	Tony Rubin, Schramm	3:45
10.	"Screaming Dead Balloons"		3:17
11.	"Living in the Country"	Pete Seeger	2:14

CD reissue bonus tracks
No.	Title	Writer(s)	Length
12.	"The River of Water"		2:30
13.	"A House Is Not a Motel"	Arthur Lee	3:43
14.	"Crispy Duck"		3:04
15.	"Closing Time"	Sammy Walker	3:45

== Personnel ==
Yo La Tengo

- Ira Kaplan – vocals, guitar
- Dave Schramm – guitar, vocals on "The Way Some People Die" and "Five Years"
- Mike Lewis – bass guitar
- Georgia Hubley – drums

Additional personnel

- David Bither – saxophone on "Screaming Dead Balloons"
- Mike Tchang – saxophone on "The River of Water"
- Chris Nelson – trombone on "The River of Water"
- Clint Conley – bass guitar on "The Forest Green," "The Empty Pool," and "Alrock's Bells"
- Dave Rick – bass guitar on "The River of Water" and "A House Is Not a Motel"

Technical

- Ken French – engineering
