= New Wave Hot Dogs =

Studio album by Yo La Tengo
- Released: 1987
- Studio: Waterhouse Studio
- Genre: Indie rock
- Length: 34:35
- Label: Coyote
- Producer: Yo La Tengo

Yo La Tengo chronology
Ride the Tiger (1986)	New Wave Hot Dogs (1987)	President Yo La Tengo (1989)

New Wave Hot Dogs is the second studio album by American indie rock band Yo La Tengo, released in 1987 by record label Coyote.

== Re-releases ==
The CD version (released by Coyote/Twin Tone Records) included the band's following album President Yo La Tengo and the A-side of the 1987 single "The Asparagus Song". It was re-released by Matador Records, in 1996.

== Reception ==
Professional ratings
Review scores
Source	Rating
AllMusic	4/5 stars
NME	10/10
Underground	(2 1/2/3)

The album was described by Dave Henderson in a 1988 review in Underground magazine as "a fine album, a loveable set of tunes – all put together with the greatest of ease." AllMusic called it "a quantum leap over the sound of their debut".

== Track listing ==
All songs written by Ira Kaplan except where noted.

No.	Title	Writer(s)	Length
1.	"Clunk"		3:32
2.	"Did I Tell You"		3:30
3.	"House Fall Down"		2:45
4.	"Lewis"		2:31
5.	"Lost in Bessemer"	Ira Kaplan, Georgia Hubley	1:22
6.	"It's Alright (The Way That You Live)"	Lou Reed, John Cale	4:10
7.	"3 Blocks from Groove Street"		2:24
8.	"Let's Compromise"	Chris Nelson	1:51
9.	"Serpentine"	Kaplan, Phil Milstein	1:57
10.	"A Shy Dog"		3:36
11.	"No Water"	Kaplan, Phil Milstein	3:18
12.	"The Story of Jazz"		3:34

== Personnel ==
- Ira Kaplan — guitars, vocals
- Stephan Wichnewski — bass
- Georgia Hubley — drums

Additional Personnel

- Chris Stamey — guitar (tracks 4, 11)
- Dave Rick — guitar (track 8)
