= Stuff Like That There (album) =

Studio album by Yo La Tengo
- Released: August 28, 2015
- Recorded: Brooklyn Recording, Kaleidoscope Sound and Water Music
- Genre: Indie rock
- Length: 45:41
- Language: English
- Label: Matador

Yo La Tengo chronology
Fade (2013)	Stuff Like That There (2015)	Murder in the Second Degree (2016)

Stuff Like That There is the fourteenth studio album by American indie rock band Yo La Tengo, released in August 2015 by record label Matador.

== Content ==
On this album, the band revisits the original concept of their 1990 album Fakebook with a mix of cover songs, "covers" of Yo La Tengo songs, and brand new originals.

== Reception ==
Professional ratings
Aggregate scores
Source	Rating
AnyDecentMusic?	7.0/10
Metacritic	74/100
Review scores
Source	Rating
AllMusic	4/5 stars
Billboard	3.5/5 stars
The Guardian	4/5 stars
NME	7/10
Pitchfork	7.1/10
Record Collector	4/5 stars
Rolling Stone	3.5/5 stars
Slant Magazine	3.5/5 stars
Uncut	8/10
Vice (Expert Witness)	A

At Metacritic, which assigns a normalized rating out of 100 to reviews from mainstream critics, Stuff Like That There received an average score of 74, based on 28 reviews, indicating "generally favorable reviews". Reviewer Mark Deming of AllMusic commented that "If Stuff Like That There isn't as revelatory as Fakebook, it's a splendid, beguiling album that's perfectly suited for late nights and rainy afternoons, and a welcome reminder of one of the many, many things Yo La Tengo do so well." In his review for The Guardian, Ben Thompson asked whether another Yo La Tengo covers record was really needed and concluded that "[t]he answer to that question appears to be yes." NME reviewer Noel Gardner said that the band had "honed their approach to a point where they can't really sound like anyone except themselves", which he said was "key to the deep likeability" of the record. Critic Stuart Berman of Pitchfork said that "taken as a whole, the record stands as a loving portrait of Yo La Tengo's vast musical and social universe condensed into a small wooden frame. And at a time when the full-album experience is giving way to the almighty playlist, Stuff Like That There handily reasserts Yo La Tengo's reputation as indie rock’s consummate curators." Robert Christgau named it the second best album of 2015 in his ballot for The Village Voice's annual Pazz & Jop critics poll.

== Track listing ==
No.	Title	Writer(s)	Length
1.	"My Heart's Not In It"	Gerry Goffin, Russ Titelman	2:48
2.	"Rickety"	Yo La Tengo	3:47
3.	"I'm So Lonesome I Could Cry"	Hank Williams	2:52
4.	"All Your Secrets"	Yo La Tengo	3:18
5.	"The Ballad of Red Buckets"	Yo La Tengo	4:49
6.	"Friday I'm in Love"	Perry Bamonte, Boris Williams, Simon Gallup, Robert Smith, Porl Thompson	3:11
7.	"Before We Stopped to Think"	Bill Bruner, Dave Green, Ron House, Matt Wyatt, Mark Wyatt	2:59
8.	"Butchie's Tune"	Steve Boone	2:47
9.	"Automatic Doom"	Dan Cuddy	2:37
10.	"Awhileaway"	Yo La Tengo	4:03
11.	"I Can Feel the Ice Melting"	George Clinton, Tamala Lewis	2:36
12.	"Naples"	Tim Harris	2:45
13.	"Deeper Into Movies"	Yo La Tengo	5:09
14.	"Somebody's In Love"	Raymond Dancer, Lonnie Tolbert	2:06
Total length:			45:41

== Charts ==
Chart (2015)	Peak position
Belgian Albums (Ultratop Flanders)	77
Belgian Albums (Ultratop Wallonia)	86
Dutch Albums (Album Top 100)	76
French Albums (SNEP)	85
Portuguese Albums (AFP)	29
Spanish Albums (Promusicae)	35
UK Albums (Official Charts)	86
US Billboard 200	96
