= Kate Jacobs =

American singer-songwriter (born 1959)

- Born: January 11, 1959 (age 67); Alexandria, Virginia, United States
- Origin: New York City, United States
- Genres: Folk, Americana
- Instruments: Guitar, vocals
- Years active: 1980s–present
- Label: Bar/None
- Website: www.katejacobsmusic.com

Kate Jacobs (born January 11, 1959) is an American singer-songwriter.

== Biography ==
Jacobs wanted to become a ballet dancer. Her father was in the United States Foreign Service, and she moved to Austria when she was eleven.

Her family was a singing one, if not formally musical. Her father sang old Tin Pan Alley songs at home, and her mother sang Russian ballads and American standards. At church, she sang songs of the civil rights era and the folk revival, and some songs such as "Up, Up and Away". She was a fan of Fred Astaire, and her disparate musical tastes included standards written by Cole Porter, Irving Berlin, and Johnny Mercer, as well as country music by artists like Loretta Lynn.

During the early 1980s, Jacobs moved to New York City. She continued to dance, but by 1987, she had started to write songs. In 1992, she recorded her first album, The Calm Comes After Bar/None Records. She followed in 1995, with What About Regret. In 1999, she released her third album, Hydrangea, to which guests Peter Holsapple, Vicki Peterson and Susan Cowsill added their musical contributions, as did long-time cohorts Dave Schramm and James MacMillan. The key songs on the album are taken from her family's history. "Never Be Afraid" is based on a phrase of her Aunt Katia's in 1938 when the family was emigrating to the US; "A Snowy Street" is based on a journal entry of her doctor grandfather in post-revolutionary Russia; "Eddy Went To Spain" is about an uncle who fought in the Abraham Lincoln Brigade for the republican side in the Spanish Civil War, and "Good Doctor" was based on a journal of Elena, a fourteen-year-old Tuberculosis patient of her great grandfather's, who fell in love with her physician.

After Hydrangea, she became busy with her family life, and did not release another album for six years. In 2004, she released her fourth album, You Call That Dark. After a six-year hiatus while she raised two sons, Jacobs, a Hoboken, New Jersey resident since 1981, released her fifth album Home Game in January 2011 through Small Pond Music.

== Discography ==
- The Calm Comes After (Bar/None, 1993)
- What About Regret (Bar/None, 1995)
- Hydrangea (Bar/None, 1998)
- You Call That Dark (Bar/None, 2004)
- Home Game (2011)
