= Yo La Tengo =

American indie rock band

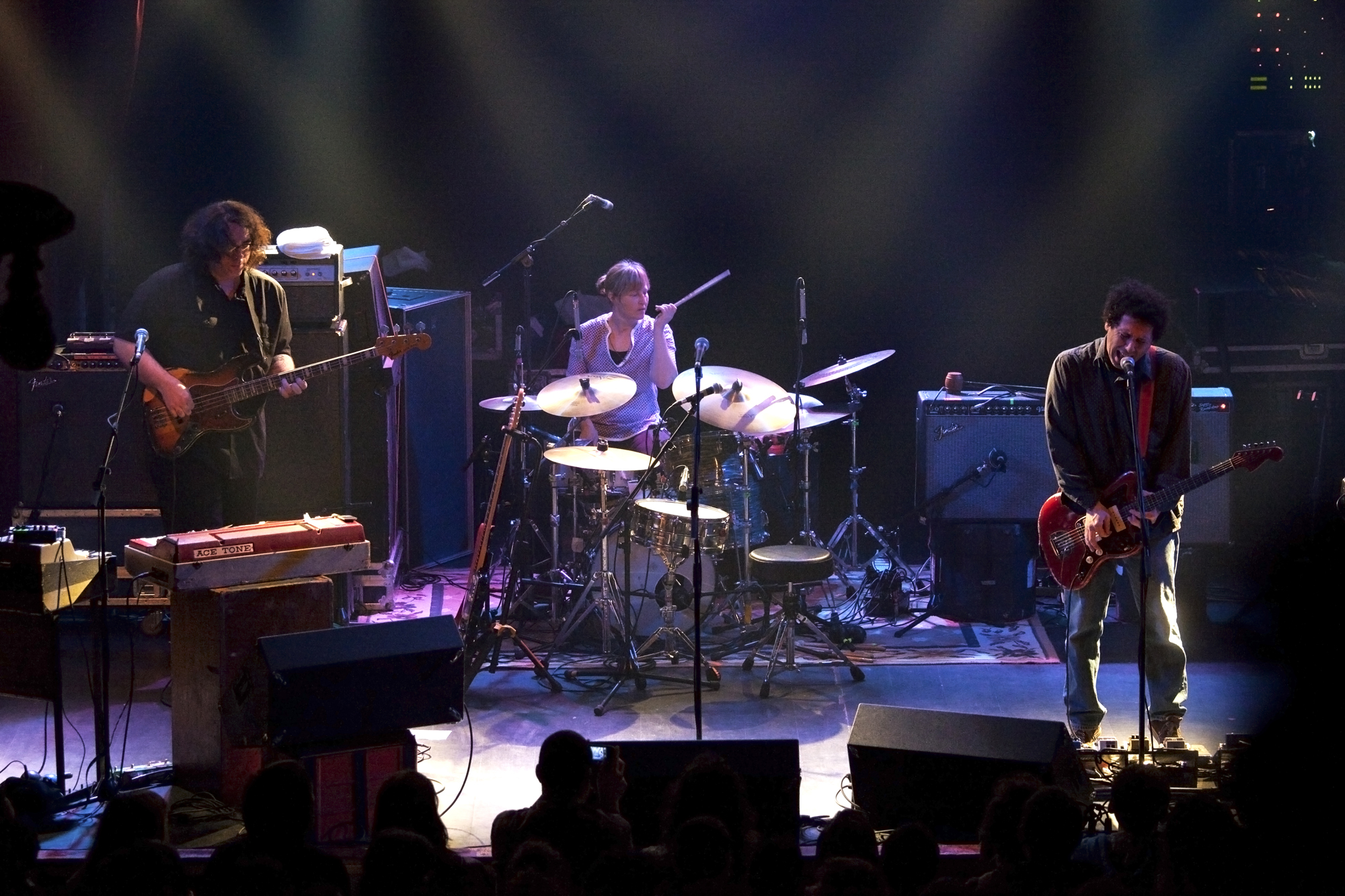
- Yo La Tengo performing in 2010. From left to right: McNew, Hubley, and Kaplan

Background information
- Origin: Hoboken, New Jersey, U.S.
- Genres: Indie rock; noise pop; experimental rock; shoegaze
- Years active: 1984–present
- Labels: Matador; Bar/None; City Slang; Alias; Arts & Crafts México; Three Lobed
- Members: Georgia Hubley; Ira Kaplan; James McNew
- Past members: Dave Schramm; Dave Rick; Mike Lewis; Clint Conley; Steve Michener; Stephan Wichnewski; Chris Stamey; Wolf Knapp; Tony Maimone; Robert Vickers; Al Greller; Gene Holder; Wilbo Wright; Janet Wygal; Tim Harris
- Website: www.YoLaTengo.com

Yo La Tengo (Spanish for "I've got it"; also abbreviated as YLT) is an American indie rock band formed in Hoboken, New Jersey, in 1984. Since 1992, the lineup has consisted of Ira Kaplan (guitars, piano, vocals), Georgia Hubley (drums, piano, vocals), and James McNew (bass, vocals). In 2015, original guitarist Dave Schramm rejoined the band and appeared on their fourteenth album, Stuff Like That There.

Despite achieving limited mainstream success, Yo La Tengo has been called "the quintessential critics' band" and maintains a strong cult following. Though they mostly play original material, the band performs a wide repertoire of cover songs both in live performance and on record.

== History ==
=== Formation and early history, 1984–1985 ===
Ira Kaplan and Georgia Hubley formed the band as a couple in 1984. They chose the name Yo La Tengo, Spanish for "I have it". The name came from a baseball anecdote from the 1962 season told by Richie Ashburn, when New York Mets center fielder Ashburn and shortstop Elio Chacón collided in the outfield. When Ashburn went for a catch, he would yell, "I got it! I got it!" only to run into Chacón, a Venezuelan who spoke only Spanish. Ashburn, who before spoke only English, learned to yell, "Yo la tengo! Yo la tengo!" instead. In a later game, Ashburn happily saw Chacón backing off. He relaxed, positioned himself to catch the ball, and was run over by left fielder Frank Thomas, who understood no Spanish and had missed a team meeting that proposed using the words "Yo la tengo!" as a way to avoid outfield collisions. After getting up, Thomas asked Ashburn, "What the hell is a yellow tango?" Ashburn got many laughs out of the story, but its provenance is dubious. Thomas always insisted that Ashburn made the whole thing up.

Kaplan and Hubley placed an advertisement to recruit other musicians who shared their love for bands such as the Soft Boys, Mission of Burma, and Arthur Lee's Love. The group's debut recording was a 7" single, "The River of Water", backed with a cover of Lee's "A House Is Not a Motel", released in late 1985 with Dave Schramm on lead guitar and Dave Rick on bass. After recording "Private Doberman" for the Coyote Records compilation Luxury Condos Coming to Your Neighborhood Soon, Rick left the band and was replaced by Mike Lewis, the founding bass player of Boston garage-punk bands DMZ and Lyres, who was also a member of Brooklyn garage rock band the A-Bones throughout his tenure in YLT.

=== Early releases, 1986–1989 ===
In 1986, Yo La Tengo released their first LP, Ride the Tiger, on Coyote Records. Produced by former Mission of Burma bassist Clint Conley who also took over bass duties on three songs, the album "marked Yo La Tengo as a band with real potential" according to reviewer Mark Deming. Kaplan was credited as "naive guitar" on the sleeve, and in the liner notes for the 1993 reissue of the album on City Slang Records, went so far as to say "Dave's guitar playing is inarguably the best thing about the record."

Schramm and Lewis left the band after the album's release, with Kaplan subsequently taking on the role of lead guitar and Stephan Wichnewski joining to play bass. The group's next album New Wave Hot Dogs (1987) sold poorly, but, per Deming, "was a quantum leap over the sound of their debut."

The release of President Yo La Tengo in 1989 did much to establish the band's reputation among rock critics; Robert Christgau praised the "mysterioso guitar hook" of the first song, "Barnaby, Hardly Working". Produced by Gene Holder of The dB's, the album was the band's last release on Coyote. Despite the album's positive reception, sales were still poor and Wichnewski left the band not long after. Hubley and Kaplan carried on as a duo and began playing two-electric-guitar shows.

=== Bar/None and Alias Records, 1990–1992 ===
Yo La Tengo reunited with Dave Schramm in 1990 to record Fakebook, an album of mostly acoustic tunes, including covers of Cat Stevens, Gene Clark, the Kinks, Daniel Johnston, among others. It also featured five original songs, including an acoustic version of "Barnaby, Hardly Working". Again produced by Gene Holder, the album's folk sound was a change of pace for the band. Years later, Kaplan recalled that the album was "just me and Georgia looking for an excuse to record with Dave Schramm and Al Greller" who played guitar and double bass on the album, respectively.

In 1991, with Dave Schramm in tow, Yo La Tengo collaborated with Daniel Johnston on the song "Speeding Motorcycle" which was released as a single. The band also released a 7" single on Bar/None Records with the song "Walking Away from You" backed with a cover of Beat Happening's "Cast a Shadow." Gene Holder produced the single and played the bass. The That Is Yo La Tengo EP released later that year included some tracks that would end up on the group's next LP.

After the release of That Is Yo La Tengo, James McNew (who also records under the solo moniker Dump) began playing bass with the band, forming the trio that continues to make up the band today. According to McNew,

I originally signed on as a fill-in for a short US tour, and a 4-week summer tour of Europe with Eleventh Dream Day. One night after a show in Munster, I was to look after our box of merchandise while Ira and Georgia went gallovanting [sic] through the town, meeting their policemen. Needless to say, during our soundcheck in Hamburg the next day, it suddenly dawned on me that I had left the box filled with copies of this EP back at the club in Munster. Oh man, was I in trouble... Sure... blame it on the rookie.

The band recorded May I Sing with Me in Boston with Holder producing and Lou Giordano engineering. The album was released on Alias Records in 1992. Three of the album's eleven songs ("Swing for Life", "Out the Window" and "Five-Cornered Drone") were carried over from the That Is Yo La Tengo EP and feature Holder on bass. The Upside-Down EP was released on CD in support of the album, rounding out the band's releases on Alias.

=== Early Matador period, 1993–2000 ===
In 1993, Yo La Tengo began their partnership with Matador Records, releasing a 7" and CD5 of the song "Shaker" which the band recorded with John Siket in New Jersey. The following LP, 1993's Painful, was also the beginning of the band's fruitful creative partnership with producer Roger Moutenot, who has produced all of their subsequent albums up until 2013's Fade, which was produced by John McEntire. Painful is the first Yo La Tengo album to feature James McNew on every song. Ira Kaplan explains:

I think this group really started when we made the record Painful. . . . Painful was the first record that we made as the three of us, and I think it sounds different from the things that came before it. Even though I can see connections with the earlier records and things we've done since, it really seems like mostly we've built on that record. Anything from before then is really, really different to me. Since Painful, I think we've gotten more confident and more willing to trust ourselves and trust each other, and probably better at dealing with things that go wrong.

Rob Sheffield, writing in The New Rolling Stone Album Guide remarked that McNew "became an essential part of the sound on Painful, the 1993 album that kept every promise Yo La Tengo ever made and blew their previous highlights away." Critical reaction was quite positive, with reviewer Stephen Thomas Erlewine calling it "a subtly addicting album." Robert Christgau also praised the group once again, writing in his review that Yo La Tengo is "always friendly. This is not the forbidding experimentation of an aspiring vanguard. This is the fooling around of folks who like to go out on Saturday night and make some noise—and then go home humming it." The band released Electr-O-Pura in 1995 to similar acclaim. For the first time, all songs were credited to the band as a whole rather than individual members; this became the norm for all future releases.

In 1996 the band had a role in the movie I Shot Andy Warhol as an anonymous version of the Velvet Underground, a Warhol-associated band to whom Yo La Tengo were often compared in their early years.

The band's 1997 LP I Can Hear the Heart Beating as One synthesized the group's eclectic combination of folk, punk rock, shoegaze, long instrumental noise-jams, and electronic music into a sprawling, multi-faceted style. Critical reaction was extremely positive; Pitchfork awarded the album a 9.7 out of 10, and AllMusic reviewer Stephen Thomas Erlewine wrote that it was "arguably Yo La Tengo's finest and most coherent album to date." Kaplan recalled a turning point in the band's musical progression:

I think after Electr–O-Pura we've had a direction of trying not to worry too hard about what the next album is going to sound like. Everything we've ever played on we just do whatever seems right at the moment, we just write a bunch of songs, and then go one baby step at the time and just do what seems right.

With their critical reputation higher than ever before, the band toured extensively and their fan base continued to grow. In 1998, they collaborated with Jad Fair and released the album Strange but True to mixed reviews. Yo La Tengo had a cameo role as a Salvation Army band in the 1998 Hal Hartley film The Book of Life, and feature on its 1999 soundtrack release. The band entered the studio again in late 1999 to record their ninth LP. And Then Nothing Turned Itself Inside-Out was released in February 2000 to a warm reception. The album features some intimate songs with hushed, varied instrumentation and includes the 17-minute meditation "Night Falls On Hoboken".

=== Continued acclaim and soundtrack work, 2001–present ===
In 2001, Yo La Tengo recorded an instrumental score for eight short undersea documentaries by Jean Painlevé, entitled The Sounds of the Sounds of Science. The program debuted at the San Francisco Film Festival and has been performed live approximately twelve times. The band also released an EP with covers of Sun Ra's "Nuclear War" in late 2002.

The band's tenth LP, Summer Sun, was released in 2003. Although the album received generally favorable reviews, some critics found the album's quiet atmosphere "underwhelming." Others criticized the band for a perceived lack of invention. When asked about the album's quiet nature, Kaplan stated,

We made a decision at the last second just to leave the loud songs off. We were looking at the material we recorded and just trying to put out the best record that we could. At a certain point, we just thought it seemed right to put out the quiet ones. I've been aware that there's been some surprise about that and people saying it's even quieter than the last record, which has sort of taken me by surprise.

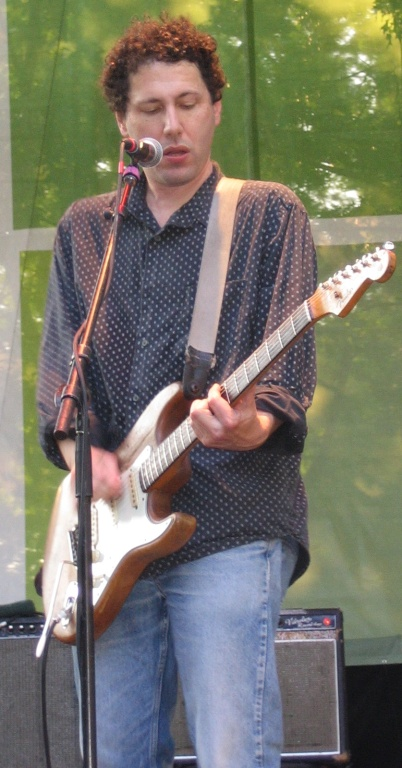
Ira Kaplan of Yo La Tengo playing in Battery Park, New York City, July 4, 2005

Yo La Tengo collaborated with Yoko Ono on the 2003 charity album Wig in a Box: Songs from and Inspired by Hedwig and the Angry Inch in support of the Harvey Milk High School. The band put together their first "best of" compilation entitled Prisoners of Love: A Smattering of Scintillating Senescent Songs: 1985–2003 which was released in 2005. They composed scores for four more films, 2005's Junebug and Game 6, and 2006's Shortbus and Old Joy. Their scores for these four films were collected on the 2008 compilation They Shoot, We Score.

Their eleventh LP, I Am Not Afraid of You and I Will Beat Your Ass, was released in 2006 to universal acclaim. Informed by their soundtrack work, the arrangements included more strings and horns than any of the band's previous albums. Kaplan told an interviewer: "I think we gained an element of comfort with using that kind of instrumentation, and it became something we could draw on for our other songs." In addition, the album was book-ended with two guitar jams lasting over ten minutes each.

In 2006, the band released Yo La Tengo Is Murdering the Classics, a compilation of their live impromptu cover-song performances on the New Jersey freeform radio station, WFMU. As part of the station's annual fundraising marathon, listeners who called in to pledge money to the station could request a favorite which the band then performed on the spot. In late 2007, the band began performing acoustically for "The Freewheelin' Yo La Tengo" tour. Audiences were encouraged to request songs and ask questions which, Kaplan stated, the band tried to answer "in a strategic manner so that the answers to the questions will lead to the next song."

In March 2008, Yo La Tengo performed under the alias "Condo Fucks" at Brooklyn's Magnetic Field. As Condo Fucks, the band released an album of cover songs, Fuckbook, on Matador in March 2009.

Popular Songs, the band's 12th album, was released on September 8, 2009. The album was recorded in the band's rehearsal space in New Jersey and features two songs with elaborate string sections (composed by jazz composer Richard Evans). It entered the Billboard chart at No. 58, the highest entry of the band's career thus far.

In 2009, Yo La Tengo contributed to Stroke: Songs for Chris Knox, a tribute album for New Zealand rock and roll musician Chris Knox who suffered a stroke in June 2009. Yo La Tengo covered Knox's song "Coloured". All proceeds from the album went towards Knox's recovery. Also in 2009, Yo La Tengo contributed a cover of the song "Gentle Hour" to the AIDS benefit album, Dark Was the Night, produced by the Red Hot Organization.

Preceding their album Popular Songs, Yo La Tengo released an EP titled Here to Fall Remixes in the summer of 2010. Remixes of their single “Here to Fall” were done by De La Soul, RJD2, and Pete Rock. This was Yo La Tengo's third out-of-the-box remix EP in 14 years, following the Autumn Sweater Remix and Danelectro Remix EPs.

In 2012 Yo La Tengo recorded a cover of Todd Rundgren's "I Saw the Light" for a fund raising CD titled Super Hits Of The Seventies for radio station WFMU. In August 2012 they announced the release of an EP in September 2012, to be followed by an album in January 2013. The EP includes three versions of the song "Stupid Things": the single version, a remix by EYƎ, and the original 12-minute instrumental version.

The following album, Fade, was released on January 15, 2013.

In 2014 they toured and performed live onstage as film maker Sam Green live narrated an evolving version of his new film The Love Song of R. Buckminster Fuller in Austin, Burlington, Detroit, Ithaca, Portland, New Orleans and Vancouver.

In 2014, they played an Indiana-based Night Ranger cover band Bobby Night Ranger in the final episode of season 6 of the television series Parks and Recreation.

On August 28, 2015, Yo La Tengo released Stuff Like That There, an album (and "a sequel of sorts to Fakebook") of re-recorded versions of some of their old songs as well as covers, including songs by The Cure, Hank Williams, and Sun Ra.

In 2016, the band released Murder in the Second Degree, a second compilation of their live impromptu cover-song performances on the New Jersey freeform radio station, WFMU.

In 2017, the band played two dates in New York City with Robyn Hitchcock. The performances included the Hitchcock album "Black Snake Diamond Role" in its entirety, as well as collections of classic Hitchcock songs and covers of other artists.

In 2018, Yo La Tengo released their 15th studio album, There's a Riot Going On, which Pitchfork decided 'reflects the group's greatest and most instantly recognizable strengths'.

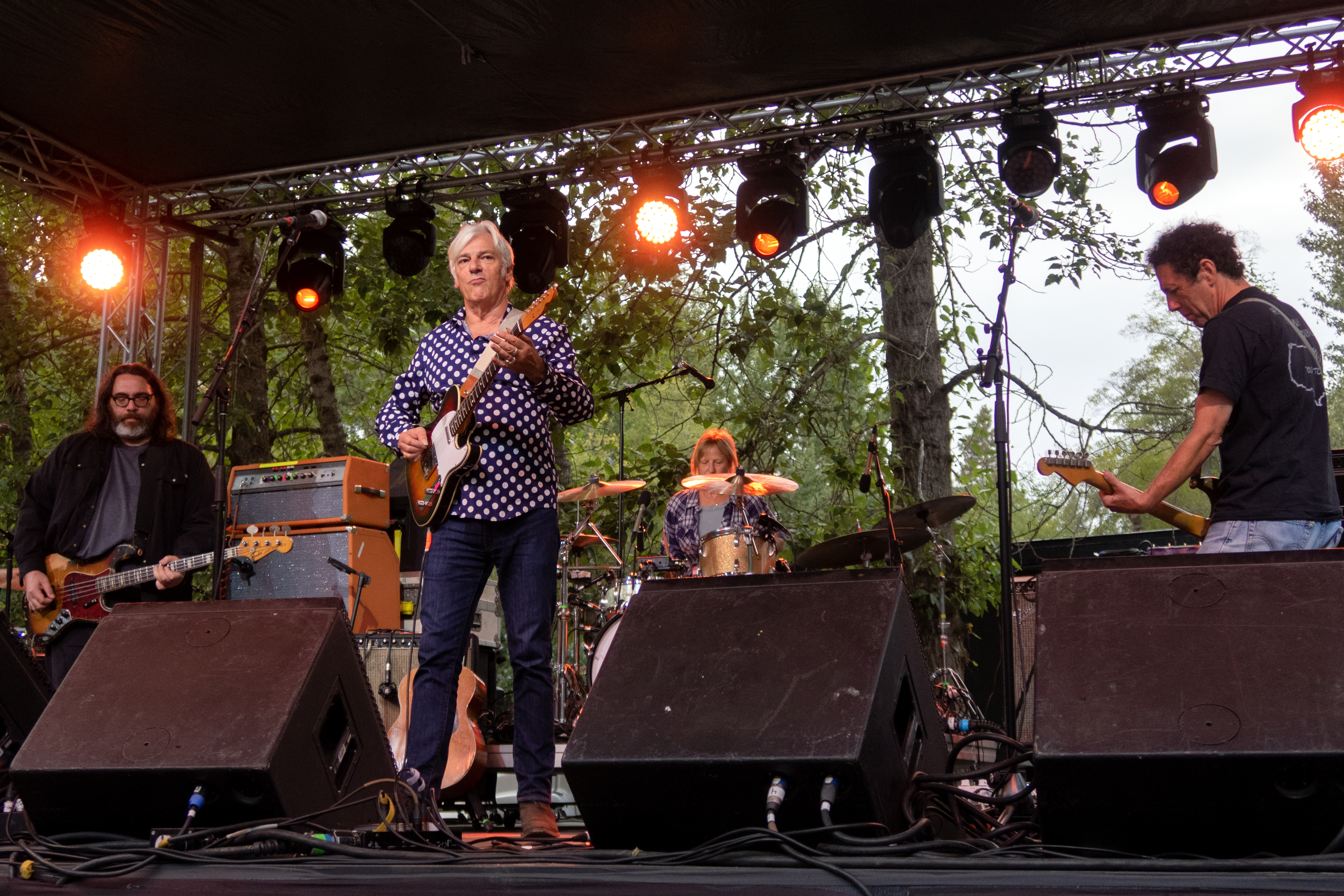
Yo La Tengo backing Robyn Hitchcock in 2019

In 2020, Yo La Tengo released We Have Amnesia Sometimes which was recorded over a 10-day period from late April to early May amid the COVID-19 pandemic. The album consists of five instrumental, ambient compositions which were recorded with one microphone in the room and the band spread out adhering to social distance protocols laid out by Governor Murphy of New Jersey.

On February 10, 2023, the band released their seventeenth studio album This Stupid World.

== Musical style and influences ==
AllMusic describes Yo La Tengo's style as diverse, incorporating "noisy" guitar work and "dreamy" melodies that are "infused with an understated sweetness that made even their noisiest freakouts feel accessible and their extended jams compelling in their exploration". They have cited the Kinks, the Velvet Underground, My Bloody Valentine and Bob Dylan as influences.

== Band members ==
Yo La Tengo have always had the core members Ira Kaplan and Georgia Hubley. They have had 15 bass players. James McNew has been the bass player since 1992's May I Sing With Me.

Current

- Ira Kaplan – lead and backing vocals, guitar, keyboard (1984–present)
- Georgia Hubley – drums, lead and backing vocals, percussion, keyboard, guitar (1984–present)
- James McNew – bass, guitar, percussion, keyboard, lead and backing vocals (1991–present)

Past

- Dave Rick – bass (1984-85)
- Dave Schramm – guitar, keyboards, vocals (1985–1986, 1990, 2015-16)
- Mike Lewis – bass (1985–1986)
- Clint Conley - bass (1986)
- Steve Michener - bass (1986)
- Stephan Wichnewski – bass (1986, 1986–1988, 1989)
- Chris Stamey - bass (1986)
- Wolf Knapp - bass (1988)
- Tony Maimone - bass (1988)
- Robert Vickers - bass (1989)
- Al Greller - bass (1990, 1991)
- Gene Holder - bass (1990)
- Wilbo Wright - bass (1990)
- Janet Wygal - bass (1990)
- Tim Harris - bass (1991)

== Discography ==
Studio albums

- Ride the Tiger (1986)
- New Wave Hot Dogs (1987)
- President Yo La Tengo (1989)
- Fakebook (1990)
- May I Sing with Me (1992)
- Painful (1993)
- Electr-O-Pura (1995)
- I Can Hear the Heart Beating as One (1997)
- And Then Nothing Turned Itself Inside-Out (2000)
- Summer Sun (2003)
- I Am Not Afraid of You and I Will Beat Your Ass (2006)
- Popular Songs (2009)
- Fade (2013)
- Stuff Like That There (2015)
- There's a Riot Going On (2018)
- We Have Amnesia Sometimes (2020)
- This Stupid World (2023)

EPs

- Sleepless Night (2020)

Film Soundtracks

- The Sounds of the Sounds of Science (2001)
- They Shoot, We Score (2008)

== See also ==
- Music of New Jersey
