= Embrace discography =

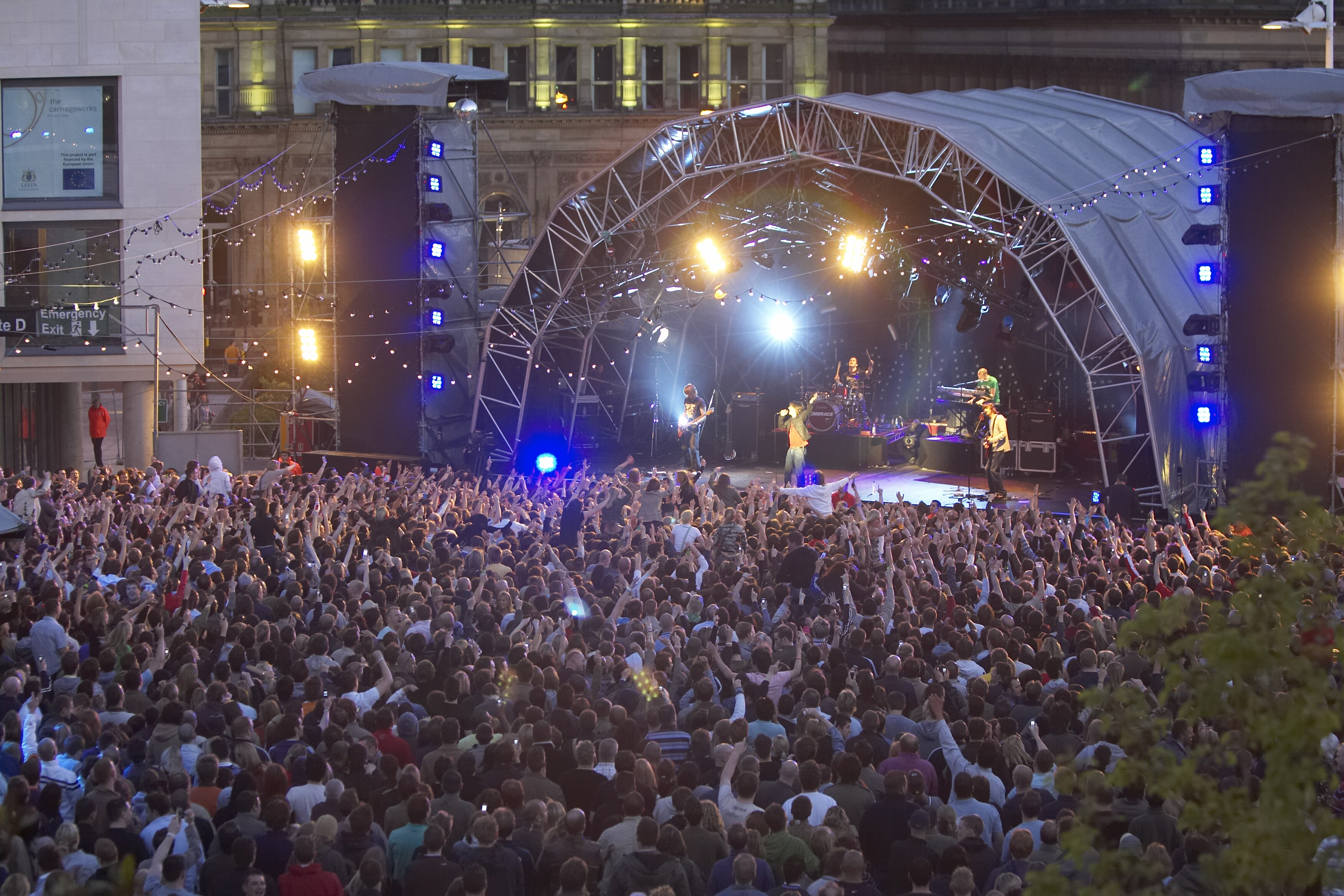
- Embrace performing live in Leeds
- Studio albums: 9
- Extended plays: 6
- Compilation albums: 3
- Singles: 18
- Video albums: 3
- Music videos: 22

The discography of the English rock band, Embrace. The band's highest-charting single is "Nature's Law", which reached number two on the UK Singles Chart in 2006. The albums This New Day, Out of Nothing and The Good Will Out all reached number one on the UK Albums Chart.

== Albums ==
=== Studio albums ===
| Title | Album details | Peak chart positions | | | | | | Certifications |
| Title | Album details | UK | UK Digital | UK Indie | GER | IRE | SCO | Certifications |
|---|---|---|---|---|---|---|---|---|
| The Good Will Out | Released: 8 June 1998; Label: Hut/Virgin/Mobetta (HUT46/7243 8 46015 2 2); Format: CD, CS, DL, LP, MD | 1 | — | — | — | — | 2 | BPI: Platinum |
| Drawn from Memory | Released: 27 March 2000; Label: Hut/Virgin/Mobetta (HUT60/7243 8 49014 2 4); Format: CD, CS, DL, LP, MD | 8 | — | — | — | 24 | 7 | BPI: Gold |
| If You've Never Been | Released: 3 September 2001; Label: HutVirgin/Mobetta (HUT68/7243 8 10973 2 8); Format: CD, CS, DL, LP | 9 | — | — | — | 54 | 7 | BPI: Silver |
| Out of Nothing | Released: 13 September 2004; Label: Independiente (ISOM45/5185722006); Format: CD, CD+DVD-V, CS, DL, LP | 1 | — | — | 86 | 39 | 1 | BPI: 2× Platinum |
| This New Day | Released: 27 March 2006; Label: Independiente (ISOM60); Format: CD, CD+DVD-V, DL, LP | 1 | 1 | 1 | — | 32 | 1 | BPI: Gold |
| Embrace | Released: 28 April 2014; Label: Cooking Vinyl (COOK603); Format: CD, CD+DVD-V, DL, LP | 5 | 6 | 1 | — | 58 | 4 | |
| Love Is a Basic Need | Released: 2 March 2018; Label: Cooking Vinyl (COOK692); Format: CD, CS, DL, LP | 5 | — | — | — | 93 | 3 | |
| How to Be a Person Like Other People | Released: 26 August 2022; Label: Mobetta; Format: CD, CS, DL, LP | 9 | — | 1 | — | — | 2 | |
| Avalanche | Released: 12 June 2026; Label: Cooking Vinyl; Format: CD, DL, LP | 5 | — | 1 | — | — | 4 | |
"—" denotes items that did not chart or were not released in that territory.

=== Compilation albums ===
| Title | Album details | Peak chart positions | | Certifications |
| Title | Album details | UK | SCO | Certifications |
|---|---|---|---|---|
| Fireworks: The Singles 1997–2002 | Released: 25 March 2002; Label: Hut/Virgin (HUT74/724381208328); Format: CD, DL | 36 | 27 | BPI: Gold |
| Dry Kids: B-Sides 1997–2005 | Released: 31 September 2005; Label: Hut (HUT 86); Format: CD, DL | — | — | |
| The Essential | Released: 2007; Label: Virgin (5047602); Format: CD, DL | — | — | |
"—" denotes items that did not chart or were not released in that territory.

== Extended plays ==
| Title | Extended play details | Peak chart positions | | |
| Title | Extended play details | UK | UK Indie | SCO |
|---|---|---|---|---|
| Fireworks | Released: 5 May 1997; Label: Hut (HUT84/7243 8 94232 2 8); Format: CD, 7", 12" | 34 | — | 34 |
| One Big Family | Released: 7 July 1997; Label: Hut (HUT86/7243 8 94399 2 2); Format: CD, 7", 12" DL | 21 | — | 22 |
| All You Good Good People | Released: 27 October 1997; Label: Hut (HUT90/7243 8 94634 2 2); Format: CD, 7", 12" DL | 8 | — | 7 |
| The Good Will Out | Released: 1998; Label: Hut (HUT107/7243 8 95566 6 7); Format: CD, 12" | — | — | — |
| The Abbey Road Sessions | Released: 11 January 1999; Label: Hut (HUT109); Format: CD, 7" | — | — | — |
| Refugees | Released: 11 February 2014; Label: Cooking Vinyl (FRY560); Format: CD, DL, 12" | — | 50 | — |
| Love Is a Basic Need | Released: 3 February 2016; Label: Sony/ATV; Format: CD, DL, 10" | — | — | — |
"—" denotes items that did not chart or were not released in that territory.

== Singles ==
| Year | Title | Peak chart positions | | | | | Certifications | Album |
| Year | Title | UK | UK Digital | UK Indie | IRE | SCO | Certifications | Album |
|---|---|---|---|---|---|---|---|---|
| 1997 | "All You Good Good People" | 8 | — | — | — | 7 | | The Good Will Out |
| 1998 | "Come Back to What You Know" | 6 | — | — | — | 4 | | The Good Will Out |
| 1998 | "My Weakness Is None of Your Business" | 9 | — | — | — | 7 | | The Good Will Out |
| 1999 | "Hooligan" | 18 | — | — | — | 38 | | Drawn from Memory |
| 2000 | "You're Not Alone" | 14 | — | — | — | 12 | | Drawn from Memory |
| 2000 | "Save Me" | 29 | — | — | — | 25 | | Drawn from Memory |
| 2000 | "I Wouldn't Wanna Happen to You" | 23 | — | — | — | 21 | | Drawn from Memory |
| 2001 | "Wonder" | 14 | — | — | — | 12 | | If You've Never Been |
| 2001 | "Make It Last" | 35 | — | — | — | 34 | | If You've Never Been |
| 2004 | "Gravity" | 7 | — | — | — | 2 | BPI: Gold | Out of Nothing |
| 2004 | "Ashes" | 11 | — | — | — | 8 | BPI: Silver | Out of Nothing |
| 2005 | "Looking as You Are" | 11 | — | — | — | 9 | | Out of Nothing |
| 2005 | "A Glorious Day" | 28 | — | — | — | — | | Out of Nothing |
| 2006 | "Nature's Law" | 2 | 2 | 1 | 36 | 1 | | This New Day |
| 2006 | "World at Your Feet" | 3 | 9 | 1 | — | 9 | | This New Day |
| 2006 | "Target" | 29 | — | 1 | — | 14 | | This New Day |
| 2006 | "I Can't Come Down" | 54 | — | 4 | — | 31 | | This New Day |
| 2014 | "Follow You Home" | — | — | 13 | — | — | | Embrace |
| 2014 | "I Run" | — | — | — | — | — | | Embrace |
| 2014 | "In The End" | — | — | — | — | — | | Embrace |
| 2017 | "The Finish Line" | — | — | — | — | — | | Love Is a Basic Need |
| 2017 | "Wake Up Call" | — | — | — | — | — | | Love Is a Basic Need |
| 2018 | "Never" | — | — | — | — | — | | Love Is a Basic Need |
| 2018 | "Love Is a Basic Need" | — | — | — | — | — | | Love Is a Basic Need |
| 2018 | "Adrenalin" | — | — | — | — | — | | Love Is a Basic Need |
| 2022 | "The Terms of My Surrender" | — | — | — | — | — | | How to Be a Person Like Other People |
| 2022 | "Death Is Not the End" | — | — | — | — | — | | How to Be a Person Like Other People |
"—" denotes items that did not chart or were not released in that territory.

== Video albums ==
- Fireworks: The Singles 1997–2002
- SG 14 Live In Majorca
- Embrace – A Glorious Day Live in Leeds (2005)

== Other appearances ==
- "Forever Young" (performed live at Royal Albert Hall)
