= List of songs recorded by Embrace =

The following are a list of songs released by English rock band Embrace from 1997 to the present day. The dates given are the dates on which the songs were released. The highest ever chart position was reached by the single "Nature's Law" which was ranked 2nd. The albums This New Day, Out of Nothing and The Good Will Out all reached number 1 on the charts.

== Singles ==
- We Are It (2022)
- Death Is Not The End (2022)
- The Terms Of My Surrender (2022)
- Love Is A Basic Need (2018)
- Never (2018)
- Wake Up Call (2017)
- The Finish Line (2017)
- I Run (2014)
- Follow You Home (2014)
- Refugees (2014)
- I Can't Come Down (2007)
- Target (2006)
- World at Your Feet (2006)
- Nature's Law (2006)
- A Glorious Day (2005)
- Looking As You Are (2005)
- Ashes (2004)
- Gravity (2004)
- Make It Last (2001)
- Wonder (2001)
- I Wouldn't Wanna Happen to You (2000)
- Save Me (2000)
- You're Not Alone (2000)
- Hooligan (1999)
- The Good Will Out (1998)
- My Weakness Is None of Your Business (1998)
- Come Back to What You Know (1998)
- All You Good Good People (1997)
- One Big Family (1997)
- Fireworks (1997)

== B-sides (released on albums) ==
B-sides from the album Dry Kids: B-Sides 1997–2005

- The Shot's Still Ringing
- Madelaine
- Flaming Red Hair
- How Come
- Dry Kids
- Butter Wouldn't Melt
- Too Many Times
- Blind
- Maybe I Wish
- Free Ride
- Feels Like Glue
- I've Been Running
- Brothers And Sisters
- Milk And Honey
- The Way I Do
- Love Is Back
- Waterfall

== B-sides (not released on albums) ==
- Bash The Rat (2018)
- The White Alien (2018)
- Adrenalin (2018)
- DNA (2014)
- Equal
- Bullets (2014)
- Decades (2014)
- Chameleon (2014)
- Contender (2007)
- Heart & Soul (2007)
- Run Away (2006)
- One Luck (2006)
- Thank God You Were Mean To Me (2006)
- Just Admit It (2006)
- Love Order (2006)
- Whatever It Takes (2006)
- What Lies Behind Us (2006)
- Deliver Me (2006)
- Collide (2006)
- Soulmates (2006)
- Red Eye Shot (2005)
- Hallelujah (2005)
- The Final Say (2005)
- I Ache (2005)
- Soldiers Hours (2005)
- Enough (2004)
- Wasted (2004)
- Fight Yer Corner (2001)
- It's You I Make It For (2001)
- Giving, Forgiving and Giving In (2001)
- What You've Never Had You'll Never Have (2001)
- Anywhere You Go (2001)
- Today (2001)
- Everyday (2001)
- Caught In a Rush (2001)
- The First Cut (2000)
- I Know What's Going On (2000)
- Top of the Heap (2000)
- Get On Board (2000)
- Still So Young (2000)
- A Tap On Your Shoulder (2000)
- Happy And Lost (2000)
- Come On And Smile (2000)
- Like A Believer (1999)
- With The One Who Got Me Here (1999)
- I Can't Feel Bad Anymore (1999)
- Don't Turn Your Back On Love (1998)
- Feelings I Thought You Shared (1998)
- If You Feel Like A Sinner (1998)
- Perfect Way (1998)
- You've Only Gotta Stop To Get Better (1997)
- You Don't Amount To Anything - This Time (1997)

== Songs released only on albums ==
How To Be A Person Like Other People

- Up
- Remember Me
- Run Away With Me
- Rubble
- How To Be A Person Like Other People
- I Miss You
- For Kate

Love Is A Basic Need

- Snake Oil
- Where You Sleeping
- All That Remains
- Rabbit Hole
- Horseshoe In My Glove
- My Luck Comes In Threes

Embrace

- Protection
- In The End
- Quarters
- At Once
- Self Attack Mechanism
- The Devil Looks After His Own
- A Thief On My Island

This New Day

- No Use Crying (2006)
- Sainted (2006)
- Celebrate (2006)
- Exploding Machines (2006)
- Even Smaller Stones (2006)
- The End Is Near (2006)
- This New Day (2006)

Out of Nothing

- Someday (2004)
- Wish 'Em All Away (2004)
- Keeping (2004)
- Spell It Out (2004)
- Near Life (2004)
- Out Of Nothing (2004)

If You've Never Been

- Over (2001)
- I Hope You're Happy Now (2001)
- Many Will Learn (2001)
- It's Gonna Take Time (2001)
- Hey, What You Trying To Say (2001)
- If You've Never Been In Love With Anything (2001)
- Happiness Will Get You In The End (2001)
- Satellites (2001)

Drawn from Memory

- The Love It Takes (2000)
- Drawn from Memory (2000)
- Bunker Song (2000)
- New Adam New Eve (2000)
- Yeah You (2000)
- Liars Tears (2000)
- I Had A Time (2000)

The Good Will Out

- Retread (1998)
- Higher Sights (1998)
- I Want The World (1998)
- You've Gotta Say Yes (1998)
- The Last Gas (1998)
- That's All Changed Forever (1998)
- Now You're Nobody (1998)

== Cover songs ==
- "Three Is A Magic Number" (released on the album of singles - Fireworks)
- "How Come" originally by D12 (released on "Radio 1's Live Lounge)
- "Chestnuts Roasting on an Open Fire" (can be found on a rare 1 song album titled 'The Christmas Song')
- "I Believe In Father Christmas" (original by Greg Lake, recorded in 2004)

== Other songs ==
- Forever Young (performed live at RAH)
