= Embrace (English band Embrace album) =

2014 album by Embrace

Studio album by Embrace
- Released: 25 April 2014
- Recorded: August 2011 – January 2014 at Magnetic North Studios (Halifax, England)
- Genre: Alternative rock
- Length: 46:22
- Label: Cooking Vinyl
- Producer: Richard McNamara

Embrace chronology
This New Day (2006)	Embrace (2014)	Love Is a Basic Need (2018)

Singles from Embrace
- 1. "Refugees" Released: 13 January 2014 (radio); 2. "Follow You Home" Released: 21 April 2014; 3. "I Run" Released: 30 June 2014; 4. "In the End" Released: 29 December 2014

Embrace is the eponymously titled sixth studio album by English alternative rock band Embrace. The album, produced by vocalist Richard McNamara, was released on 25 April 2014 in Friday-release countries and on 28 April 2014 in the United Kingdom by independent record label Cooking Vinyl. The album was the band's first in eight years, after the release of their fifth studio album This New Day in 2006.

Embrace, created with a goal to outdo their debut studio album, the critically acclaimed The Good Will Out, features a return to the band's original form, dropping the post-britpop influenced and commercially accessible sounds of their previous two albums, Out of Nothing and This New Day. On this album, the band draws influences from post-punk bands from the 1970s and 80s, with electronic instruments and sounds and further influences from hard rock music. With the creative process of the album lasting a total of three years of writing and another three years in production, Embrace was recorded at Richard McNamara's self-built Magnetic North Studios in Halifax, England.

The album was lightly promoted by the band and label Cooking Vinyl in the lead-up to its release, with the launch of the album being accompanied by a limited theatrical run of the band's live film Magnetic North. The album's release cycle is reminiscent of the release cycle of The Good Will Out, with full-length extended plays and singles with multiple tracks being released in promotion of the album, a release cycle strategy which would otherwise be an unusual in the digital age of music. The album reached number 5 in the UK albums chart.

== Background ==
Over eight years prior to the release of Embrace, the band released their fifth studio album, This New Day, in 2006. The album became the band's third to peak at number 1 in the UK Albums Chart, after making a "hot-shot" debut in the first week of release, and was received with positive reception, with the album currently certified as Gold in the UK. Two of the band's singles released in 2006 also made huge successes for the band; "Nature's Law", which was released as the lead single promoting This New Day, and "World at Your Feet", which was used as the official song of the England national football team at the 2006 FIFA World Cup, charting at number 2 and 3 on the UK Singles Chart respectively.

It was expected that Embrace would return to the studio after touring for This New Day was over, however, no activity from the band was reported for a full four years until lead singer Danny McNamara confirmed through NME in April 2011 that the band were about to start working on their sixth studio album, and that the band had amassed 150 song ideas, eight of which McNamara described as "killer". McNamara has stated on numerous occasions that the ideology behind the band's sixth studio album, and the primary reason for the length of the creative process leading into the sixth studio album was to do better than their highly acclaimed debut album, 1998's The Good Will Out, and that the band was unwilling to return with material that wasn't, in their opinion, better than The Good Will Out, claiming that creating something better, or at the very least on-par, with their debut album would re-ignite new interest in the band and attract new listeners, given the success that their debut had made. He stated in 2014:

"We had been away so long because we were unwilling to return with an album unless it was better than our debut. That was the rule we set, and I think we've done that. If I was going to explain Embrace to a person that had never heard us, I'd play them "All You Good Good People", from our first album, "Ashes" from Out of Nothing and this new album from start to finish. Some people who've heard the single have said it's not what they'd expect from us and that it doesn't sound like Embrace, but I think we've always moved things forward and tried new things. We've been away for quite a while, and for us this feels like natural evolution."

— Danny McNamara

== Composition ==
Drummer Mike Heaton, in an interview with the Burton Mail, described the album as "not as different as we thought it might be, although the influences go back to a very much darker time for music". He cited Joy Division and New Order, bands popular in the 1970s and 80s, as influences in the creative process of the album, with Heaton commenting that the album had "lots of bass riffs". He further stated that Embrace was more complex musically, compared to the band's mid-2000s albums, but still retains the "same identity" in the lyrics and music. He further stated that "It was a big melting pot of ideas but the whole hangs together really well".

== Recording ==
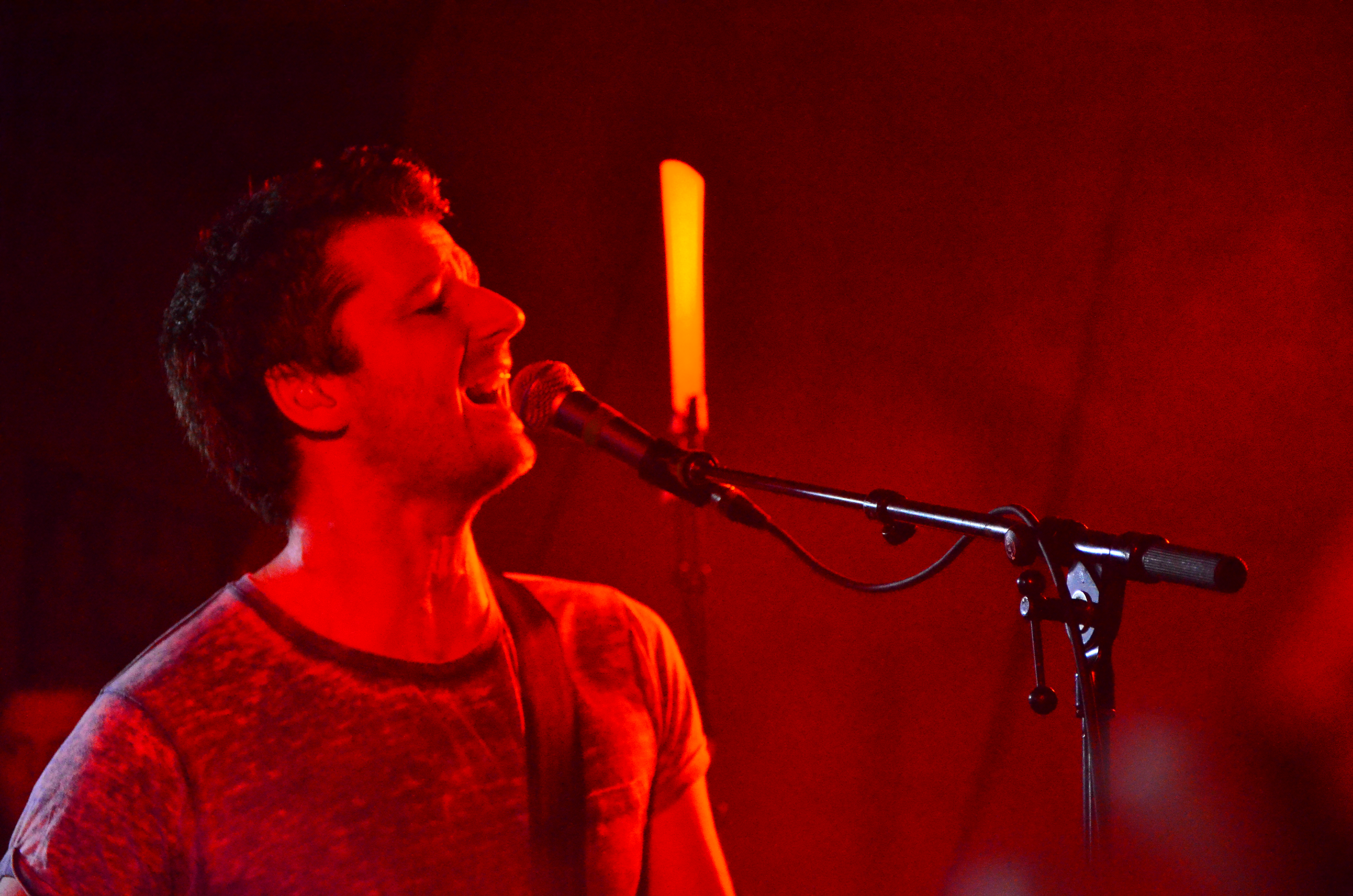
Guitarist and producer Richard McNamara contributed greatly to the recording and production of Embrace, serving as one of only two personnel working on the album outside the band itself.

The album was recorded at Magnetic North Studios, built by guitarist and producer Richard McNamara. McNamara had built Magnetic North Studios at Halifax in West Yorkshire in 2007 in an effort to boost his production career, with acoustics and architecture designed by McNamara himself. The studio had been previously used by McNamara and British rock band Operahouse for recording and production on the band's second studio album Escape from the Sun, released in 2009. Magnetic North was also used by indie pop band Thomas Tantrum for recording and production on the band's debut studio album Thomas Tantrum, released in 2008.

After three years of writing new material for their sixth studio album, the band began production on the album in August 2011. Richard McNamara wrote on the band's Facebook page on 12 August 2011 announcing their return to the studio, seven years after the release of This New Day, stating "We've gone from barely seeing or speaking to each other, dodging rumours about a band split, to living out of each others pockets and I just know somewhere in my bones that they've got my back both musically and spiritually...". He also jokingly noted that the band's "quality control" had been "set to stun".

== Packaging ==
The album art for Embrace features the number five in stroke counting form, painted in white over a black background. Compact Disc copies of the album feature the album art with the word "Embrace" written inside a white-bordered rectangle in the top-left corner of the artwork. The artwork on the Compact Disc itself features a black bird imposed onto a red background. The Deluxe Edition of Embrace features the same artwork, with the rectangle in the top-left featuring the words "Embrace" and "Deluxe Edition" underneath the former word. The CD artwork is the same, although the DVD included with the Deluxe Edition features a white bird imposed onto a black background instead of a black one on red. The LP press of the album features the same album art without the "Embrace" typography in the top-left. The album is presented on two Vinyl discs. The album is a gatefold with the artwork featuring graffiti-inspired paintings, reminiscent of the artwork for "Refugees" and "Follow You Home". The discs themselves feature the same bird-on-background artwork as the CDs and DVDs from the other physical presses of the album. Sides A and C feature the white bird on black and sides B and D feature the black bird on red.

The "Super Deluxe Edition" of Embrace is encased in a black box, with the number five in stroke counting form embossed onto the top of the box. The box includes both the CD+DVD and LP presses of the album and a download code to the digital download version of the album. It also includes a T-shirt with the album artwork on the front face, a signed A4 photograph of the band, a printed copy of the hand-written and illustrated lyric and song ideas booklet used by the band during the creative process of the album, an extract from Danny McNamara's "lyric book", a 12x12 inch print of the SG20 artwork, and an entry ticket to an album launch party attended by the band.

== Promotion ==
Embrace was officially unveiled by the band and Cooking Vinyl on 13 January 2014. The official announcement was accompanied by the release of "Refugees" to UK Modern rock radio the same day and the release of the Refugees music video. The track, however, was deemed "too dynamic" by radio playlisters, and thus did not gain airplay, preventing the track from charting on the UK Singles Chart. A four-track extended play, entitled Refugees was released on 14 February 2014, serving as the second release in promotion of Embrace. Despite climbing to #2 on the UK iTunes album chart, it was not eligible to chart in the UK due to the absence of a chart for extended plays under the Official Charts Company in the UK.

The release of Embrace was accompanied by a limited theatrical release of the band's live film Magnetic North, which is included in the album's Deluxe and "Super Deluxe" editions. The film was screened at the Hyde Park Picture House in Leeds and at a Rough Trade East store in London on 25 April 2014 and at the Miners Community Arts and Music Centre in Manchester on 26 April 2014.

== Critical reception ==
Professional ratings
Aggregate scores
Source	Rating
Metacritic	58/100
Review scores
Source	Rating
Clash	8/10
Drowned in Sound	7/10
The Guardian	2/5 stars
The Line of Best Fit	7/10 stars
Mojo	2/5 stars
musicOMH	3/5 stars
Renowned for Sound	4/5 stars
Uncut	5/10
AllMusic	4/5 stars

Upon its release, Embrace was met with mixed reviews from music critics. At Metacritic, which assigns a normalized rating out of 100 to reviews from mainstream critics, the album received an average score of 58, which indicates "mixed reviews", based on 11 reviews.

Gareth James of London-based music magazine Clash wrote positively of the album, describing the album as "10 strikingly powerful songs". He wrote: "Self-produced and melding electronic elements to their more conventional methods, this is a record by a band that has fallen in love with making music again". In an article about the discography of the band leading into the release of Embrace, entitled Embrace: The Complete Guide and described as "The timeline to a triumphant comeback", he additionally wrote: "The album keeps throwing up must-replay moments in a way of which Embrace no longer seemed capable. This is a bold and largely brilliant record that should be listened to with open ears". Marc Burrows of UK-based music webzine Drowned in Sound also wrote positively of the album. He gave a bitterly positive comment on the album's sound, comparing individual tracks and the album as a whole to various acts of the 70s and 80s, stating that "Somewhere in the last few years the Yorkshire five piece have reinvented themselves, they’ve been listening to Depeche Mode, the best bits of U2 and a shit-load of New Order and Joy Division, and yes they’re pretty much ripping those sounds off, but ya know what? It really, really works". He also stated that "It’s a hell of a rug-pull from a band long written-off, and a reminder to some of us that everything should be approached with an open mind".

Matt Tomiak of music website The Line of Best Fit gave the album a positive review, writing that "Embrace’s old calling cards, mammoth, bellow-along choruses and a lyrical blend of vulnerability and bluster" remain "intact" on Embrace. He further noted that "Despite the curveballs and their extended break from the biz, the band’s phasers remain set to festival-primed, punch-the-air anthemic bravado, a formula as solid today as it was in their early feted period". Jamie Parmenter of music magazine Renowned for Sound also gave a positive review of the album, commenting on the album's 70s and 80s influences: "Embrace seem to have moved into a new era with this record, but in a backwards direction. This isn't a bad thing as they seem to have settled on the 80s with an indie vibe". He also commended the band's decision to take extend the production of the album over seven years, stating that the length of the creative process "has done a world of wonders for the band. It's allowed them to reflect on where they were, where they were going and rekindled their love of music. They’ve released a record which feels like they enjoyed creating, and the time and effort comes through in their mix of nostalgia and the current".

Alan Ashton-Smith of music website musicOMH, alternatively, gave a mixed review of the album, stating that "The album hits more often than it misses. Longstanding fans will either love or loathe the more prominently electronic direction, but it’s clear that Embrace have succeeded in keeping up with the times while continuing to sound like the same band". Uncut Magazine also gave the album a mixed review, commenting: "Gone, for the most part, are the aching ballads in favour of identikit stadium rock epics somewhere between Simple Minds and Coldplay, overlain with '90s dance beats". Tim Jonze of Manchester-based national newspaper The Guardian, however, gave the album a negative review. Describing the album as "vaguely uplifting, anthemic guitar pop", he states that "Almost all of the songs here could soundtrack an Ashes highlights package or that moment when a reality TV star winner gets to see their "best bits" reel". Mojo also additionally wrote negatively of the album, commenting: "Embrace is [a] schizophrenic stab at modernity, [from] bolting synths and clattering drum patterns to forgettable harmonies, with limp results".

Danny McNamara had told XFM that Coldplay lead singer, and friend of McNamara, Chris Martin, was fond of Embrace compared to the band's earlier material. McNamara said that "When he heard our third album, he didn't like it at all. This album he was like 'Wow'. He was really buzzing about it all, which is great because, obviously, he's done all right for himself".

== Track listing ==
All tracks are written by Danny McNamara, Richard McNamara. All tracks produced by Richard McNamara.

Embrace
No.	Title	Length
1.	"Protection"	3:57
2.	"In the End"	4:30
3.	"Refugees"	4:59
4.	"I Run"	4:11
5.	"Follow You Home"	4:03
6.	"Quarters"	4:53
7.	"At Once"	3:56
8.	"Self Attack Mechanism"	4:33
9.	"The Devil Looks After His Own"	4:49
10.	"A Thief on My Island"	6:31
Total length:		46:22

Embrace Digital download
No.	Title	Length
11.	"Dna"	5:11
Total length:		51:33

Embrace Japanese Edition
No.	Title	Length
11.	"Equal"	4:04
12.	"Follow You Home" (Acoustic)	3:36
13.	"Refugees" (Acoustic)	4:25
Total length:		58:35

== Personnel ==
Adapted from Embrace liner notes.

Embrace

- Mickey Dale – keyboards, backing vocals, string arrangement
- Steve Firth – bass
- Mike Heaton – drum kit, percussion, backing vocals
- Danny McNamara – lead vocals
- Richard McNamara – guitar, keyboards, percussion, backing vocals

Technical personnel

- Richard McNamara – producer, engineer
- Nick Watson – mastering

== Release history ==
Region	Date	Format	Label	Catalog no.
Germany	25 April 2014	Digital download	Cooking Vinyl	none
United Kingdom	28 April 2014	CD	Cooking Vinyl	COOKCD603
United Kingdom	28 April 2014	Digital download	Cooking Vinyl	none
United Kingdom	28 April 2014	2xVinyl	Cooking Vinyl	COOKLP603
United States	29 April 2014	Digital download	Cooking Vinyl	none
Australia	2 May 2014	Digital download	Cooking Vinyl	none

Deluxe edition
Region	Date	Format	Label	Catalog no.
United Kingdom	28 April 2014	CD+DVD	Cooking Vinyl	COOKCD603X

== Acoustic ==
"Acoustic" is a 2014 single by British alternative rock band Embrace. The single, featuring acoustic versions of "Follow You Home" and "Refugees", is scheduled for release by Independent record label Cooking Vinyl on 28 April 2014. The single will be released exclusively through the "Exclusive Super Deluxe" edition of the band's sixth studio album Embrace.

=== Track listing ===
7"
No.	Title	Writer(s)	Length
1.	"Follow You Home" (Acoustic)
2.	"Refugees" (Acoustic)	Danny McNamara, Richard McNamara

=== Personnel ===
Embrace

- Mickey Dale – backing vocals
- Steve Firth – bass
- Mike Heaton – percussion, backing vocals
- Danny McNamara – lead vocals
- Richard McNamara – guitar, backing vocals

=== Release history ===
Country	Date	Format	Label	Catalog no.
United Kingdom	28 April 2014	7"	Cooking Vinyl	unknown
