= Out of Nothing =

Studio album by Embrace
- Released: 13 September 2004
- Recorded: 2004
- Studios: Olympic, London
- Genre: Post-Britpop
- Length: 47:24
- Label: Independiente
- Producer: Youth

Embrace chronology
Fireworks: The Singles 1997–2002 (2002)	Out of Nothing (2004)	Dry Kids: B-Sides 1997–2005 (2005)

Singles from Out of Nothing
- 1. "Gravity" Released: 30 August 2004; 2. "Ashes" Released: 15 November 2004; 3. "Looking as You Are" Released: 14 February 2005; 4. "A Glorious Day" Released: 30 May 2005

Out of Nothing is the fourth studio album by English rock band Embrace. It was released on 13 September 2004 through the label Independiente. Following the release of their third studio album If You've Never Been (2001), the band were dropped by Hut Records; around this time, the general public had lost interest in them. After signing to Independiente, they took time working on new material, until early 2004, when they recorded their next album at Olympic Studios in London with producer Martin "Youth" Glover. Out of Nothing is an indie rock album that drew comparison to the works of Coldplay and Keane.

"Gravity" was released as the lead single from Out of Nothing in August 2004; shortly afterwards, Embrace went on a tour of the United Kingdom. "Ashes" appeared as the album's second single in November 2004 in the midst of another UK tour. In the early months of 2005, the band toured the UK a third time, "Looking as You Are" was released as the third single from the album in February 2005, and they played their first-ever shows in the United States. They held two shows at the Millennium Square in Leeds, dubbed A Glorious Day, in May 2005; coinciding with this, "A Glorious Day" was released as the album's fourth and final single.

Out of Nothing received generally favourable reviews from critics, many of whom praised the high-quality songwriting, while others felt it sounded uninspired. It topped the album charts in both Scotland and the UK, while also charting in Germany and Ireland. The album was certified gold a few days after its release, and has been certified double platinum as of 2021. All of the album's singles reached the top 30 in the UK, and the top 10 in the Scotland; "Gravity" peaked the highest in both territories, with number two in Scotland and number seven in the UK. Stylus Magazine included Out of Nothing on their list of the best albums from the year.

== Background ==
Embrace released their third studio album, If You've Never Been, in September 2001 through Hut, Virgin Records and the band's own label Mobetta. It peaked at number nine in the UK Albums Chart; its two singles, "Wonder" and "Make It Last", both reached the top of the UK Singles Chart. Despite this, the band were dropped from the roster by Hut and Virgin Records less than a month later. The band promoted the album with a tour of the United Kingdom at the end of the year, with a shorter UK tour following in early 2002. While making If You've Never Been, frontman Danny McNamara said they had gathered enough material that they were considering releasing its follow-up in early 2002. In between the two UK tours, the band spent some time recording new material.

Hut Records released the band's first compilation album, Fireworks: The Singles 1997–2002, in March 2002; McNamara explained: "I see the next phase of Embrace as being quite separate and different from what the band has done up until now and this album is us signing-off on the past". Cam Lindsay of Exclaim! wrote that the career of acts hyped up by the Britpop and post-Britpop scenes was "so short it left many bands and their second albums for dead". He acknowledged that while Embrace had made a third album, the general music-buying "public had lost interest in their melodramatic epic rock and moved on". As a result, Fireworks: The Singles 1997–2002 ended up reaching number 36 in the UK.

== New label and recording ==
In March 2002, the band publicly revealed they had left Hut and Virgin to sign with the label Independiente. After leaving Hut, some of the members were forced to get day jobs. McNamara said label chairman Andy MacDonald was a fan of theirs and had seen them a few times prior. McNamara mentioned that he had been spending sometime in London writing material while the other members were building a recording studio, and that they were aiming to release a new single later in the year. According to McNamara, MacDonald told the band he was impressed with their live performances and that they had high-quality songwriting but had "never made a classic album", which was something he wanted for the label. He was content with them taking as long as they wanted for as much money as they needed.

Drummer Mike Heaton said they did not have the means of writing songs in peace previously, often feeling stressed while out touring. In December 2003, the band played a few shows under the moniker the Good Good People; McNamara explained that he had spent the "last two years doing nothing but writing songs". At MacDonald's suggestion, they worked with producer Martin "Youth" Glover, with whom they previously worked with earlier in their career. Bassist Steve Firth said by this point, they had grown accustomed to outside opinions, something they used to block out, allowing for an easier process when working with Youth. After New Years Day 2004, the band began recording at Olympic Studios in London.

Clive Goddard served as engineer, while Paul "P Dub" Walton recorded the strings; they were assisted by Phillipe Rose, Sam Miller and Bea Kenkel. McNamara said Youth "broke us into pieces, and then re-built us as a new band almost", expressing interest in wanting him for their next album. While in the mixing process, the band were offered the song "Gravity" by Coldplay frontman Chris Martin. As the process was almost done, they had disregarded the suggestion as guitarist Richard McNamara said they "had so much faith in what we’d already recorded, the potential backlash just didn’t seem necessary". After an evening of contemplation, they decided to use the song. Heaton had to do some post-production work on "Looking as You Are" as they had recorded the song at the wrong tempo, prompting them to slow the track's speed down without sacrificing the quality of the recording. Goddard mixed the recordings, before the album was mastered by George Marino at Sterling sound in New York.

== Composition and lyrics ==
=== Overview ===
Musically, the sound of Out of Nothing has been described as indie rock. The Guardian writer Dorian Lynskey said in a "revisionist twist [Embrace] are being spoken of not as post-Oasis stragglers but as big-hearted forbears of Keane and Coldplay". Adam Knott of Sputnikmusic said the guitars aim for the "rafters of packed arenas, layered and interesting but never dense enough for their effect to become masked", while the piano parts "max out the heart, whether that be in search of a massive crescendo or a gentle introduction". Gareth Jones contributed programming across the album's songs. Wil Malone served as orchestra leader and wrote the majority of the string arrangements, bar the ones for "Someday" and "Spell It Out", which were done by keyboardist Mickey Dale.

Malone was brought in by Youth, while the rest of the band wanted Dale to arrange the strings. Will Jackson provided additional material for the string sections, which were performed by the London Session Orchestra. Over a period of three years, Embrace accumulated over 500 songs that were eventually pared down to 15. This was cut down again to 10, and then one song, "Everytime That I See Your Face", was dropped in favour of "Gravity". Close to the end of the recording sessions, they jammed material as a unit for an hour at the encouragement of Youth, resulting in two songs, namely "Near Life" and "Out of Nothing". Discussing the album's title, Danny McNamara said it was a "little bit of lets get together, and not be fazed by it, because at one point, that's all we had - was ourselves, and our belief in ourselves and in each other".

=== Tracks ===
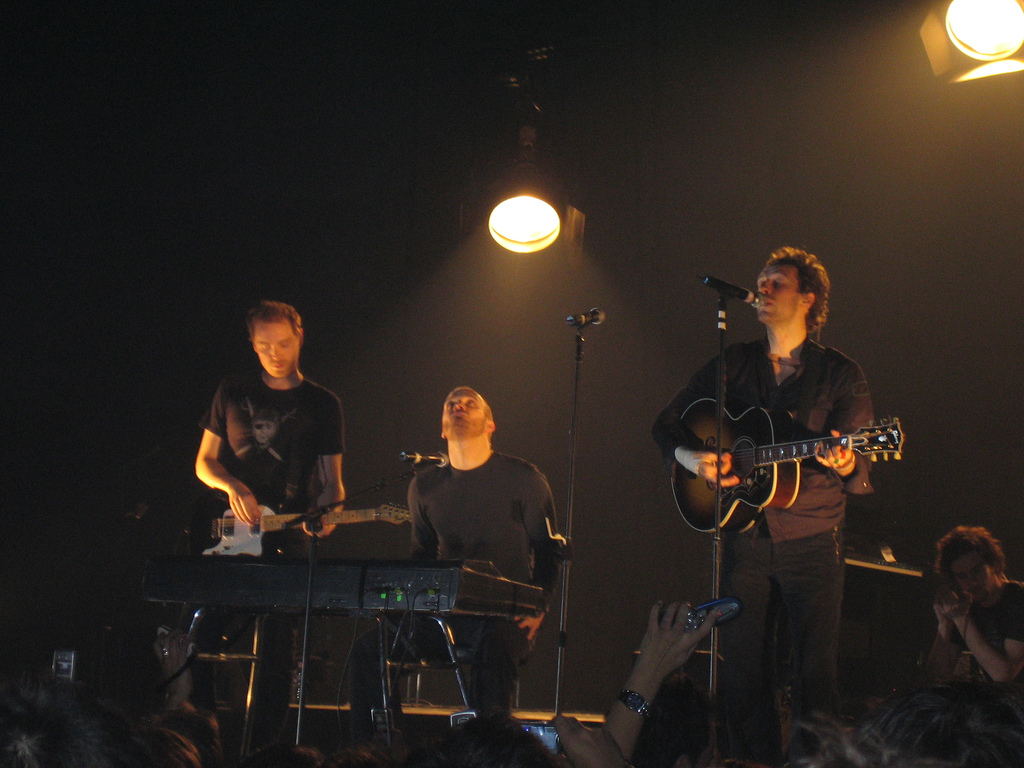
Coldplay (pictured in 2005) wrote the song "Gravity"; the two bands came across each other years prior.

Out of Nothing opens with the pop rock song "Ashes", which Pitchfork reviewer Sam Ubl said "captures the feel of post-personal disaster perspective-shift", and was compared to "Pounding" (2002) by Doves. Before it was recorded, the chorus section of "Ashes" was the only part Danny McNamara had for three years, until Richard McNamara wrote the verse sections. Danny McNamara initially had an argument with Youth on how the song should be, having originally been intended as a gentle ballad akin to "Fireworks" from their debut studio album The Good Will Out (1998), which Youth changed into an anthemic song with a disco beat. The band edited down the song's long outro section, despite Youth's insistence on retaining it.

"Gravity" was written by the members of Coldplay; Martin became friends with McNamara a few years prior when Embrace help Coldplay before they became famous. When Coldplay wrote "Gravity", Martin thought the song "sounded far too much like them for us, [...] so I asked Danny if he wanted the song and that was that". McNamara said he had heard Coldplay perform the song sometime prior and liked it, but thought nothing else of it until Martin offered it. musicOMH writer John Murphy said Embrace took the "melancholic piano sound of Mr Martin’s lot and push[ed] it through the Embrace emotional mincer", coming across in the style of "Imagine" (1970) by John Lennon and material from Coldplay's debut album Parachutes (2000).

"Someday" is a gospel rock track; the song, which McNamara wrote, dated back to 1995, but lacked a chorus section. Its chorus was taken from a demo of different song, "How Do You Like to Fly", that Richard McNamara wrote. Danny McNamara wrote "Looking as You Are" about a woman that was "spending her last night with the guy before [dating] me". Richard McNamara described the song as Mercury Rev-like vocals over a guitar riff styled after "Everybody Wants to Rule the World" (1985) by Tears for Fears. "Wish 'Em All Away" is a power ballad that features a harmonica, evoking the sound of Oasis and Travis. When Dale heard it, he asked the band if they were attempting to recreate the sound of Harvest (1972) by Neil Young, which Youth thought was a good idea.

"Keeping" is a love song about an ex-partner that PopMatters' Michael Franco said starts off with a "recurring instrumental melody, then builds to a lofty chorus, spacious guitars, and really pretty crescendos", which he felt also described the following track, "Spell It Out". The latter was originally named "Pocket to the Sun" and written by Richard McNamara on a piano, which Dale thought it was similar to the work of the Flaming Lips. "A Glorious Day" is a ballad that also recalls Oasis; Youth had unsuccessfully tried to get the band to perform it in the style of McFly. Embrace wanted the piano in the song to sound similar to the damaged piano at McNamara's house, prompting them to visit piano shops across London, and renting an upright piano. "Near Life" is a made of various jam sessions and vocal takes stitched together. The album concludes with the piano-centric "Out of Nothing", an experimental and atmospheric song with elements of Sigur Rós. Dale said the outro was inspired by post-rock acts, like Explosions in the Sky and Mogwai, that Youth had recommended.

== Release ==
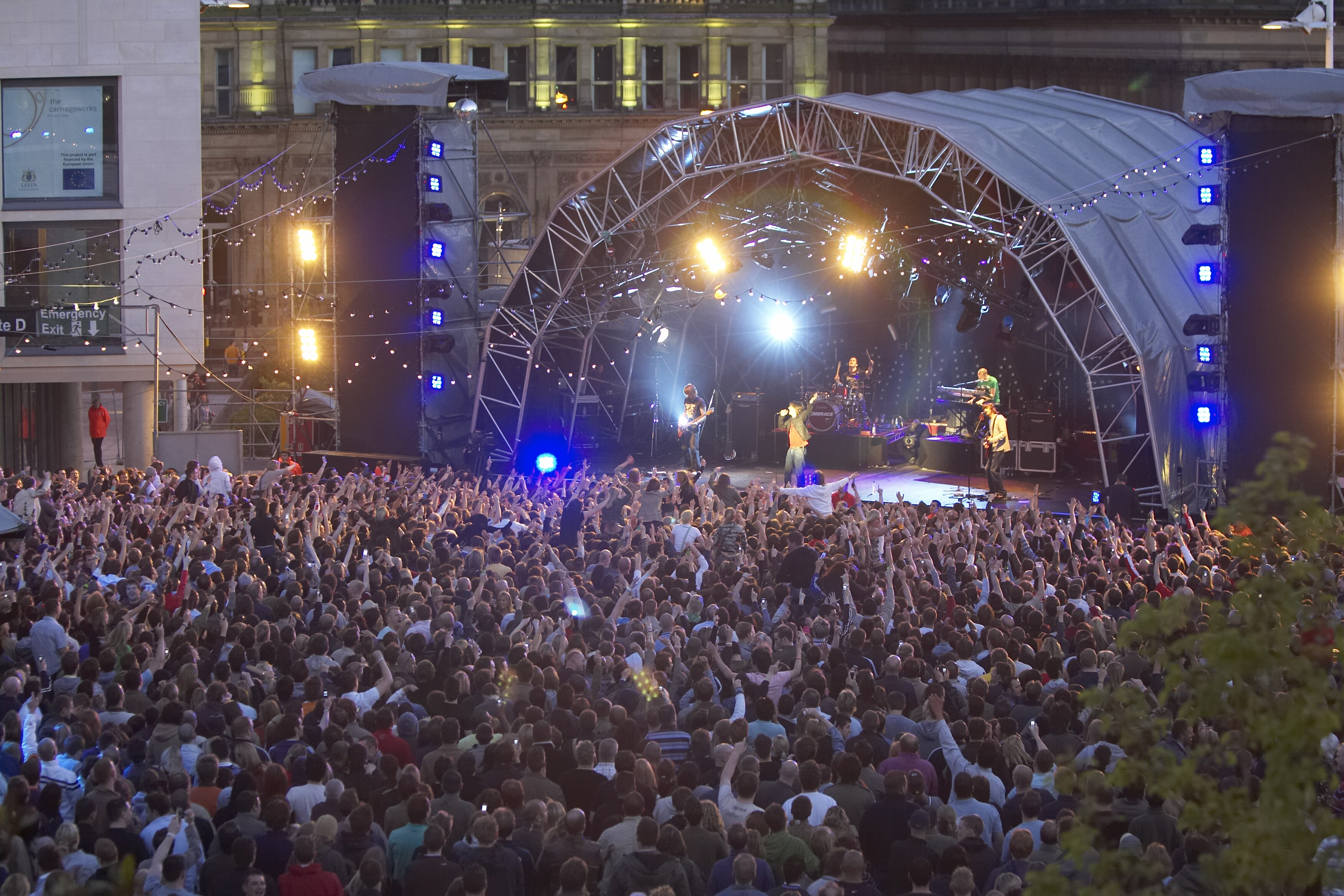
Embrace performing in Leeds; they toured throughout 2004 and 2005 in support of Out of Nothing.

On 14 June 2004, Embrace's next album was announced for release in three months' time. On 22 July 2004, the album's title was revealed as Out of Nothing, and its track listing was posted online. Shortly after this, the band played a one-off show in Brighouse, Yorkshire on 15 August 2004 to celebrate their 10th anniversary, which saw the debut of material from Out of Nothing. They appeared a V Festival a few days later after Jet pulled out because of a death in the family. Shortly after this, Embrace partially played a fan club gig in London that was ultimately shut down by the police. They promoted the "Gravity" single with a one-off show at the Shepherd's Bush Empire venue in London, prior to the release of Out of Nothing on 13 September 2004. The artwork shows the members of the band embracing one another.

To promote the album, the band told fans via text messages about secret gigs they were holding, one of which including a performance in Mallorca. Later that month, they embarked on a UK tour that ran into October 2004. Following this, they went on a longer UK tour throughout November 2004. On 15 November 2004, a special edition of Out of Nothing was released, featuring a DVD with footage of their secret gigs from two months prior. This edition also included a special code that fans could use to enter into a competition for addition secret shows at the end of the year. The band promoted it two in-store signing sessions in Leeds, Birmingham and Liverpool. They closed out the year appearing at a benefit gig for Shelter, alongside Kasabian and the Zutons, and a secret show at the Carnglaze Caverns in Cornwall.

Billboard reported in their 12 February 2005 issue that Embrace had signed to Lava Records for releases in the North American market. Between February and April 2005, Embrace went on another tour of the UK, played their first ever shows in the United States and then two gigs in Ireland. After this, Embrace went on a tour of the US with Snow Patrol in April and May 2005. Following a warm up gig at a fan's house, the band played two hometown shows in Leeds at the Millennium Square, which were dubbed A Glorious Day, at the end of May 2005. They were supported for the first show by the Ordinary Boys, the Subways, Hard-Fi and Anechoic, while other show feature Thirteen Senses, the Engineers and Infrasound. After initially planned for release in the US on 3 May 2005, Out of Nothing was eventually released there on 14 June 2005. The following month, the band performed at one of the Live 8 benefit shows.

The two A Glorious Day shows were released on DVD in 2005 through the company Eagle Vision, which also included all of the musics from Out of Nothing as well as a documentary and a fan film. It was packaged with a three-track CD that featured live versions of "Gravity", "A Glorious Day" and "Keeping". The Mallorca performance was also released on DVD in 2005, this time through Independiente. That same year, Coldplay released their own version of "Gravity" as the B-side to their song "Talk". Embrace held special shows in March 2020 where they played songs exclusively from their The Good Will Out and Out of Nothing albums. In October 2020, the band held a livestream performance where they played Out of Nothing in its entirety. To coincide with the latter, Out of Nothing and their fifth studio album This New Day (2006) were re-pressed on vinyl in 2020 through Craft Recordings; this version was done as a single-disc, in contrast to the double-disc version of the original 2004 Independiente edition.

=== Singles ===
"Gravity" was released as the lead single from the album on 30 August 2004; the seven-inch vinyl edition included "Wasted" as the B-side. Two versions were released on CD: the first with "The Shot's Still Ringing" and "Waterfall" as the B-sides, alongside the video for "Gravity", and the second with "Too Many Times" as the B-side. The music video for "Gravity", which features a cameo from Youth, was filmed at Abbey Road Studios the previous month and shows the band performing the track.

"Ashes" was released as the album's second single on 15 November 2004. It was in the running for lead single status until "Gravity" was eventually chosen. Their label told them that the song would perform better in the charts if it was released after "Gravity". The seven-inch vinyl edition included "Enough" as the B-side. Two versions were released on CD: the first with "Maybe I Wish", and the second with "Flaming Red Hair" and a live cover of "How Come" by D12 as the B-sides, alongside the music video for "Ashes". The "Ashes" video sees the band performing in a dark, dusty, abandoned theatre that subsequently restores itself and gets brighter as the song plays out. They included "How Comes" after demand from fans, after having recorded it for The Jo Whiley Show. "Ashes" was released to American modern rock radio stations on 1 March 2005.

"Looking as You Are" was released as the album's third single on 14 February 2005; the seven-inch vinyl edition included "The Final Say" as the B-side. Two versions were released on CD: the first with "Madelaine", while the included "I Ache" and "Soldiers Hours" as B-sides, alongside the music video for "Looking as You Are". The artwork consists of photos of the bands fans as their way of thanking them for their support. The "Looking as You Are" video cuts between two perspectives, Danny McNamara and a woman as they near-mirror each other's actions. It starts with the woman climbing out of bed while McNamara wakes up on a sofa. McNamara walks up to the rest of the band as they begin performing, as the woman is getting ready in a bathroom. She leaves her place as the band continues playing and eventually visits a café. She is seen walking past a bus and then finds herself in the same room as the band, before running off.

"A Glorious Day" was released as the album's fourth single on 30 May 2005; the seven-inch vinyl edition included "Hallelujah" as the B-side. Two versions of the single were released on CD: the first with "Milk and Honey" and the second with "Feels Like Glue" and "Red Eye Shot" as B-sides. The "A Glorious Day" music video is a compilation of various live performances, cut with backstage footage.

== Critical reception ==
Professional ratings
Aggregate scores
Source	Rating
Metacritic	61/100
Review scores
Source	Rating
AllMusic	4/5 stars
E! Online	B
The Guardian	2/5 stars
laut.de	3/5 stars
Pitchfork	7.3/10
PopMatters	2/10
Stylus Magazine	9/10
This Is Fake DIY	2/5 stars
Uncut	6/10
Yahoo! Launch	6/10 stars

Out of Nothing was met with generally favourable reviews from music critics. At Metacritic, which assigns a normalized rating out of 100 to reviews from mainstream publications, the album received an average score of 61, based on 16 reviews.

Murphy said Out of Nothing was a "wonderfully affecting album that is the band’s best to date", adding that it was the "record they’ve been threatening to make for years". Jack Smith of 6 Music agreed with this, adding that it "could take the Huddersfield five-piece higher than they could ever have contemplated". Ubl was surprised that the band had "turned in an effort as pretty or economical as Out of Nothing [...] "the result is less wish-wash, more dependable songwriting". The staff at AllMusic called it a "batch of well crafted songs tailor-made for the charts", praising the "euphorically expansive production". They went on to say it had zero "missteps or rough and rugged patches here: Out of Nothing is supremely confident, polished mainstream rock of the first order". Karim Adab of Stylus Magazine wrote that the album "sees them take off like an Exocet, obliterate all targets and then ricochet off under their own control". The staff at E! Online said aside from "Gravity", the band "stepped up to the challenge brilliantly with a set of stately tunes of their own".

Laut.de writer Vicky Butscher noted that it was "faster and louder" than their second studio album Drawn from Memory (2000), which she felt minimized the "emotional power of the balladesque pieces". Lynskey wrote that while the band's "first album had a stirring anthem or two, their songwriting here is both flimsy and overblown". Franco added to this, saying that "all the ingredients of the [Coldplay] recipe are here, right down to the lazy rhymes, cornball lyrics, 'uplifting' choruses, and all manner of inspirational platitudes". He went on to say it had a "decidedly contrived and boringly obvious feel" as the music was "so paint-by-numbers it probably arrived in a kit at the studio". The staff at Uncut said that after the opening three tracks, the album "sags—the old, pedestrian Embrace return, and Danny McNamara's mawkish lowing grates". Yahoo! Launch reviewer Adam Webb said the track names "reveals a band with little imagination beyond recycling 'meaningful' clichés" as it "really detracts from the heartfelt nature of the music". Stephen Ackroyd of This Is Fake DIY summarised his criticism of the album as: "there are well crafted songs here, good arrangements - the basic parts are all there. The problem? Your Mum would like it. Nobody wants that".

== Commercial performance and legacy ==
Out of Nothing topped the charts in the UK and Scotland, selling almost double as many copies that The Good Will Out did in its first week of release. It also reached number 58 in Ireland and number 86 in Germany. It peaked at number 49 and 106 on the year-end UK charts for 2004 and 2005, respectively. In the UK, the British Phonographic Industry (BPI) certified Out of Nothing gold four days after its release, platinum by November 2004, and double platinum as of 2021. "Gravity" charted at number two in Scotland and number seven in the UK. The BPI certified the song silver in 2019. "Ashes" charted at number eight in Scotland and number 11 in the UK. The BPI certified the song silver in 2023. "Looking as You Are" charted at number nine in Scotland and number 11 in the UK. "A Glorious Day" charted at number 28 in the UK.

McNamara said that had they not had received success brought on by "Gravity", they would have been dropped by Independiente and likely broke up. NME reported that the song "prompted a complete resurgence in fortunes for Embrace after a number of years on the periphery", noting that Out of Nothing had sold close to 250,000 copies within a month of its release, and that the accompanying UK and European tour was completely sold out. Stylus Magazine ranked the album at number 16 on their list of the year's 40 best releases. In 2014, journalist Gareth James wrote that the album "restored the band to the top 10 and signalled a shift towards the middle of the road in pursuit of album sales".

== Track listing ==
All songs written by Danny and Richard McNamara, except where noted.

Out of Nothing track listing
No.	Title	Writer(s)	Length
1.	"Ashes"		4:22
2.	"Gravity"	Chris Martin; Guy Berryman; Jon Buckland; Will Champion	4:40
3.	"Someday"		5:38
4.	"Looking as You Are"		4:06
5.	"Wish 'Em All Away"		3:59
6.	"Keeping"		4:32
7.	"Spell It Out"		4:57
8.	"A Glorious Day"		3:52
9.	"Near Life"	D. McNamara (lyrics); Embrace (music)	5:48
10.	"Out of Nothing"	D. McNamara (lyrics); Embrace (music)	5:32

== Personnel ==
Personnel per booklet.

Embrace

- Danny McNamara – vocals, acoustic guitar
- Richard McNamara – guitar, vocals, keyboards
- Mike Heaton – drums, percussion, backing vocals
- Steve Firth – bass guitar
- Mickey Dale – keyboards, backing vocals, strings arranger (tracks 3 and 7)

Additional musicians

- Gareth Jones – programming
- Wil Malone – strings arranger (all except tracks 3 and 7), orchestra leader
- Will Jackson – additional string material
- The London Session Orchestra – strings
- Mary Pearce – additional backing vocals
- Juliet Roberts – additional backing vocals
- Sylvia Mason – additional backing vocals
- James McNamara – additional backing vocals
- Jo McNamara – additional backing vocals
- Natalie Long – additional backing vocals
- Jennie – additional backing vocals
- Lucy – additional backing vocals

Production and design

- Youth – producer
- Clive Goddard – engineer, mixing
- Phillipe Rose – assistant
- Sam Miller – assistant
- Bea Kenkel – assistant
- Paul "P Dub" Walton – strings recording
- George Marino – mastering
- Rick Guest – photography
- Richard Bull – art direction, design

== Charts and certifications ==
=== Weekly charts ===
Chart performance for Out of Nothing
Chart (2004)	Peak position
German Albums (Offizielle Top 100)	86
Irish Albums (IRMA)	58
Scottish Albums (Official Charts)	1
UK Albums (Official Charts)	1

=== Year-end charts ===
Year-end chart performance for Out of Nothing
Chart (2004)	Position
UK Albums (OCC)	49
Chart (2005)	Position
UK Albums (OCC)	106

=== Certifications ===
Certifications for Out of Nothing
Region	Certification	Certified units/sales
United Kingdom (BPI)	2× Platinum	600,000^{‡}
^{‡} Sales+streaming figures based on certification alone.
