= Follow You Home =

Single by Embrace
- Released: 10 March 2014
- Recorded: 2011–13
- Genre: Alternative rock
- Length: 4:04
- Label: Cooking Vinyl
- Songwriter(s): Danny McNamara and Richard McNamara
- Producer(s): Richard McNamara

Embrace singles chronology
"Refugees" (2014)	"Follow You Home" (2014)	"Acoustic" (2014)

"Follow You Home" is a song written by Danny McNamara and Richard McNamara of the English alternative rock band Embrace. The song was originally recorded by the band for their eponymous sixth studio album, Embrace, where it appears as the fifth track on the album. A "Follow You Home" promotional single, featuring the Embrace track of the same name, was released to UK radio on 10 March 2014 by Cooking Vinyl. The single serves as the third overall release in promotion of Embrace, after promotional single "Refugees" and the extended play Refugees.

== Packaging ==
The radio single art for "Follow You Home" continues the graffiti motif which began with Refugees. The artwork features a multi-layered painting, with the word "Follow", painted in black, being the central focus of the artwork. It also prominently features Shades of orange, as opposed to the variations of gray featured in the artwork to "Refugees". The promotional single itself features a black border, with the artwork itself being overwritten by "Embrace" and "Follow You Home" in a black rectangle, obscuring most of the artwork.

== Promotion ==
"Follow You Home", alongside the promotional single release to UK radio, was made available early on the iTunes Store through Embrace beginning 11 March 2014, becoming the second track from the album, after third track "Refugees", to be released.

== Music video ==
A music video for "Follow You Home" was produced by the band to accompany the release of the track. The music video was premiered on music video hosting service Vevo on 30 March 2014. The three-and-a-half minute video prominently features lead singer Danny McNamara walking through the streets of London while singing along to the lyrics of the song. The video begins with a woman writing on Danny's hand, and then walking away. Danny then proceeds to walk home through the streets of London, setting off car alarms and spraying an aerosol paint canister on a wall in the meantime. He then comes home to discover that the woman had written the number five in stroke counting form, before the same woman comes and knocks on his front door.

Principal photography for the video took place on the night of 12 March 2014 in South London. The band used crowdsourcing in order to obtain six cars to use as props during the filming of the music video. The cars were used to film a scene where Danny intentionally sets off car alarms by running into the cars.

== Track listing ==
Digital download
No.	Title	Writer(s)	Producer(s)	Length
1.	"Follow You Home"	Danny McNamara, Richard McNamara	R McNamara	4:04
2.	"Equal"
Total length:				4:04

UK promotional single
No.	Title	Writer(s)	Producer(s)	Length
1.	"Follow You Home" (Radio Edit)	Danny McNamara, Richard McNamara	R McNamara	3:30
2.	"Follow You Home" (Instrumental)	D McNamara, R McNamara	R McNamara	4:04
Total length:				7:34

== Personnel ==
Adapted from Embrace liner notes.

Embrace

- Mickey Dale – keyboards, backing vocals
- Steve Firth – bass
- Mike Heaton – drum kit, percussion, backing vocals
- Danny McNamara – lead vocals
- Richard McNamara – guitar, percussion, backing vocals

== Release history ==
=== Commercial ===
Country	Date	Format	Label	Catalog no.
United Kingdom	22 April 2014	Digital download	Cooking Vinyl	none

=== Promotional ===
Country	Date	Format	Label	Catalog no.
United Kingdom	10 March 2014	Modern Rock / Alternative radio	Cooking Vinyl	unknown
