= Refugees (Embrace song) =

Single by Embrace
- Released: 13 January 2014
- Recorded: 2011–13
- Genre: Alternative rock
- Length: 3:57
- Label: Cooking Vinyl
- Songwriters: Danny McNamara, Richard McNamara
- Producer: Richard McNamara

Embrace singles chronology
"I Can't Come Down" (2006)	"Refugees" (2014)	"Follow You Home" (2014)

"Refugees" is a song written by Danny McNamara and Richard McNamara of the English alternative rock band Embrace. The song was originally recorded by the band as a track for their eponymous sixth studio album, Embrace, where it appears as the third track on the album. "Refugees" was first released as the Embrace track, but debuting on the namesake seventh extended play, Refugees, which was released in promotion of Embrace two months prior. It appears as the opening track on the EP. A "Refugees" promotional single, boasting a radio edit of the song, was sent to UK Modern rock radio in January 2014, in promotion of both Refugees and Embrace.

== Music video ==
A music video for "Refugees" was premiered on 13 January 2014 on video hosting service Vevo. The 5-minute video, directed by Richard McNamara and starring the McNamara brothers, was released parallel to the official announcement of Refugees and Embrace.

== Track listing ==
UK promotional single
No.	Title	Writer(s)	Producer(s)	Length
1.	"Refugees" (Radio Edit)	Danny McNamara, Richard McNamara	R McNamara	3:57

Japanese single
No.	Title	Writer(s)	Producer(s)	Length
1.	"Refugees"	Danny McNamara, Richard McNamara	R McNamara	5:00
2.	"Chameleon"	Danny McNamara, Richard McNamara	R McNamara	4:40
3.	"Decades"	Danny McNamara, Richard McNamara	R McNamara	4:28
4.	"Bullets"	Danny McNamara, Richard McNamara	R McNamara	3:20
5.	"Refugees" (Radio Edit)	Danny McNamara, Richard McNamara	R McNamara	3:58
6.	"Refugees" (Instrumental)	Danny McNamara, Richard McNamara	R McNamara	5:00

== Personnel ==
Adapted from Refugees liner notes.

Embrace

- Mickey Dale – keyboards, string arrangements, backing vocals
- Steve Firth – bass
- Mike Heaton – drum kit, percussion, backing vocals
- Danny McNamara – lead vocals, acoustic guitar
- Richard McNamara – vocals, guitars, keyboard, percussion, production

Additional personnel

- Nick Watson - mixing

== Release history ==
=== Promotional ===
Country	Date	Radio format	Label	Catalog no.
United Kingdom	13 January 2014	Modern rock / alternative radio	Cooking Vinyl	unknown
