= Tantrum (disambiguation) =

A tantrum is an emotional outburst, usually associated with those in emotional distress.

Tantrum may also refer to:

== Film, TV and comics ==
- Tantrum, a graphic novel by Jules Feiffer
- Tantrum (Transformers), a character from the Transformers toy line
- Tantrum, the fictional energy drink from How I Met Your Mother episode "Duel Citizenship"
- Tantrum Entertainment
- Tantrum, a Static Shock character
- Tantrums, an alternative name for the film People Toys

== Music ==
- Tantrum (Sri Lankan band), a Sri Lankan heavy metal band
- Tantrum (American band), a 1970s rock band
  - Tantrum (album), Tantrum's 1978 debut album
- Fitz and the Tantrums
- Thomas Tantrum
  - Thomas Tantrum (album)
- "Tantrum", a song by Jinjer from Duél (Jinjer album)
- Tangos and Tantrums, an album by Sylvie Lewis
- Bundle of Tantrums, an album by Jasmine Thompson

== Other ==
- Tantrum (roller coaster), a roller coaster at Six Flags Darien Lake, New York
