= Refugees (EP) =

EP by Embrace
- Released: 14 February 2014
- Recorded: August 2011 – January 2014
- Genre: Alternative rock
- Length: 17:25
- Label: Cooking Vinyl
- Producer: Richard McNamara

Embrace chronology
This New Day (2006)	Refugees (2014)	Embrace (2014)

Refugees is the seventh extended play by English band Embrace. Released on 14 February 2014 by independent record label Cooking Vinyl, the EP was the first commercial release by the band in over seven years, the last being the "I Can't Come Down", released in December 2006.

== Background ==
Said lead singer Danny McNamara on 13 January 2014, the day of Refugees' first radio airplay, "Richard brought this in as a near finished recording. It was one of the first songs we finished and it really set the bar for the rest of the album...To say we have argued over this song would be an understatement. I guess you know you've got a good one when that happens because everyone gets really precious about it. But it was really important to us that all the other tracks are strong too. We wanted to go back to how we were at the beginning when we released EPs and every track was as good as the lead track. It feels just like those days, we're all fired up and hungry for it because we've got it all to prove again."

== Promotion ==
In the weeks leading up to the release of Refugees, the opening track, "Refugees", was released early on the iTunes Store on 14 January 2014.

== Commercial performance ==
Refugees climbed to #2 on the UK iTunes album chart after its release on 17 February. Despite its commercial success in the United Kingdom, however, it was not eligible to chart in the UK due to the absence of a chart for extended plays under the Official Charts Company in the UK.

== Track listing ==
All tracks are written by Danny McNamara and Richard McNamara

Refugees
No.	Title	Length
1.	"Refugees"	4:59
2.	"Chameleon"	4:39
3.	"Decades"	4:28
4.	"Bullets"	3:19
Total length:		17:25

== Personnel ==
Adapted from Refugees liner notes.

Embrace

- Mickey Dale – keyboards, string arrangements, backing vocals
- Steve Firth – bass
- Mike Heaton – drum kit, percussion, backing vocals
- Danny McNamara – lead vocals, acoustic guitar
- Richard McNamara – vocals, guitars, keyboard, percussion, production

Additional personnel

- Nick Watson – mixing
- Nathan McGrory – artwork
- Glenn Hustler – "White noise illustration" [sic]

== Release history ==
Region	Date	Format	Label	Catalog no.
Germany	14 February 2014	Digital download	Cooking Vinyl	none
Germany	14 February 2014	Vinyl	Cooking Vinyl	FRYEP560
United Kingdom	17 February 2014	Digital download	Cooking Vinyl	none
United Kingdom	17 February 2014	Vinyl	Cooking Vinyl	unknown
United States	18 February 2014	Digital download	Cooking Vinyl	none
Australia	21 February 2014	Digital download	Cooking Vinyl	none
