= The Furnace studio =

The Furnace is one of Eastern Europe's best known recording studios, located near Razgrad, Bulgaria.

Having been built to meet the needs of post-communist Bulgaria's growing music scene it has also been home to many international artists including members of Thomas Tantrum, Moneytree and Lonely Joe Parker. Lonely Joe Parkers Album was later mixed at one of Europes finest and probably best known recording studios Abbey Road Studios

The studio was built in a 100-year-old derelict government building with artist accommodation included. The centre piece of the studio is it customized Allen and Heath desk while the architectural highlight is the 4-metre-tall (13 ft) live room with its vaulted ceilings.
