= Make It Last (disambiguation) =

"Make It Last" is a 2001 single by British band Embrace.

Make It Last may also refer to:

- "Make It Last" (Kate Miller-Heidke song), 2007 single
- "Make It Last" (Dave Audé song), 2007 single
- "Make It Last" (Jason Owen song), 2012 Australian X-factor winner's single
- "Make It Last" (Therr Maitz song), 2014 single
