= How to Be a Person Like Other People =

Studio album by Embrace
- Released: 26 August 2022
- Recorded: 2021–2022
- Studio: Magnetic North, Halifax, England
- Genre: Alternative rock
- Length: 47:12
- Label: Mobetta
- Producer: Richard McNamara

Embrace chronology
Love Is a Basic Need (2018)	How to Be a Person Like Other People (2022)

Singles from How to Be a Person Like Other People
- 1. "The Terms of My Surrender" Released: 10 May 2022; 2. "Death Is Not the End" Released: 14 June 2022; 3. "We Are It" Released: 19 July 2022

Professional ratings
Review scores
Source	Rating
musicOMH	3.5/5 stars
Record Collector	3/5 stars
Stereoboard	3.5/5 stars

How to Be a Person Like Other People is the eighth studio album by English rock band Embrace. It was released on 26 August 2022 through Embrace's own record label, Mobetta.

== Recording ==
Richard McNamara produced and mixed the album at Magnetic North Studios in Halifax, West Yorkshire, before it was mastered by Nick Watson at Fluid Mastering.

== Track listing ==
All songs written by Danny and Richard McNamara, except where noted.

How to Be a Person Like Other People track listing
No.	Title	Writer(s)	Length
1.	"Death Is Not the End"		6:34
2.	"We Are It"		3:46
3.	"Up"		4:22
4.	"Remember Me"	Richard McNamara; Sarah Walk	3:41
5.	"The Terms of My Surrender"		6:33
6.	"Run Away with Me"		3:58
7.	"Rubble"	Danny McNamara; Mickey Dale	4:43
8.	"How to Be a Person Like Other People"		5:51
9.	"I Miss You"		4:18
10.	"For Kate"	Danny McNamara; Mickey Dale	3:26
Total length:			47:12

== Personnel ==
Personnel per booklet.

Embrace

- Danny McNamara – lead vocals, artwork concept
- Richard McNamara – guitar, keyboards, vocals, production, mixing, artwork concept
- Mickey Dale – keyboards, backing vocals, string arrangements, artwork concept
- Mike Heaton – drums, percussion, backing vocals, artwork concept
- Steve Firth – bass, artwork concept

Additional musicians

- Nicole Hope Smith – additional backing vocals
- Ellen Benn – additional backing vocals
- James Smith – additional backing vocals
- Ella McNamara – additional backing vocals

Production and design

- Nick Watson – mastering
- Nathan McGrory – sleeve design, layout, artwork concept
- Neil Chapman – sleeve artwork photography

== Charts ==
Chart performance for How to Be a Person Like Other People
Chart (2022)	Peak position
Scottish Albums (OCC)	2
UK Albums (OCC)	9
UK Independent Albums (OCC)	1
