= Drawn from Memory =

Studio album by Embrace
- Released: 27 March 2000
- Recorded: 1999
- Studios: Batsford Park Manor, Gloucestershire; Olympic, London; Soundworks, Leeds
- Genres: Alternative rock, post-Britpop, Britpop, soft rock, funk rock
- Length: 48:05
- Labels: Hut; Virgin; Mobetta
- Producers: Tristin Norwell; Embrace; Hugo Nicolson

Embrace chronology
The Good Will Out (1998)	Drawn from Memory (2000)	If You've Never Been (2001)

Singles from Drawn from Memory
- 1. "Hooligan" Released: 1 November 1999; 2. "You're Not Alone" Released: 13 March 2000; 3. "Save Me" Released: 22 May 2000; 4. "I Wouldn't Wanna Happen to You" Released: 7 August 2000

Drawn from Memory is the second album by English rock band Embrace, released on 27 March 2000 by Mobetta, Hut, and Virgin Records. Following the release of their debut studio album The Good Will Out (1998), touring keyboardist Mickey Dale became an official member. Frontman Danny McNamara began suffering from writer's block, leaving guitarist Richard McNamara to handle the writing. Sessions were done at Batsford Park Manor in Gloucestershire, Olympic Studios in London, and Soundworks Studios in Leeds. Tristin Norwell and the band produced the entire album, bar "You're Not Alone", which was produced by Hugo Nicolson. Songs on the album centred around the arrangements and the interplay between instruments, instead of being melody-driven.

Drawn from Memory received generally favourable reviews from critics, some seeing it as a progression from The Good Will Out, while others felt it was weaker than that release. The album charted at number eight in the United Kingdom; it would later be certified gold in that territory. All four of its singles charted within the top 40 of the Scottish and UK Singles Charts, with "You're Not Alone" reaching the highest at number 12 and 14, respectively. "Hooligan" was released as the lead single from Drawn from Memory on 1 November 1999, which was followed by a short tour of the United Kingdom. "You're Not Alone" was released as a single on 13 March 2000, preceded by a tour of Europe. They played a handful of festival shows, bookended by the "Save Me" and "I Wouldn't Wanna Happen to You" singles on 22 May and 7 August 2000, respectively. They went on another tour of the UK towards the end of the year.

== Background and production ==
Embrace released their debut studio album The Good Will Out in June 1998. It peaked at number one in the UK; all of its singles charted within the top 40 of the UK Singles Chart, with "Come Back to What You Know" reaching the highest at number six. "All You Good Good People" attracted minor attention from college radio in the United States. Prior to embarking on a tour of Europe at the end of 1998, touring keyboardist Mickey Dale was made an official member. Vocalist Danny McNamara suffered from writer's block, and as such, his brother, and the band's guitarist, Richard McNamara handling the majority of the songwriting.

Drawn from Memory was recorded at Batsford Park Manor in Gloucestershire, Olympic Studios in London, and Soundworks Studios in Leeds. At Batsford, Tristin Norwell and his team had spent weeks constructing a state-of-the-art studio for the band to use. Norwell and the band produced nearly every song on the album, except for "You're Not Alone", which was produced by Hugo Nicolson. Norwell and Simon Sheridan handled recording, with assistance from Stuart Miller; Nicolson recorded "You're Not Alone". Nicolson mixed almost every song with assistant mix engineer Paul "P Dub" Walton, except for "Bunker Song" and "Yeah You", which were mixed by Norwell with assistance from Olly Mecock.

== Composition and lyrics ==
Drawn from Memory has been compared to Urban Hymns (1997) by the Verve. During the recording, the band were influenced by Nick Cave, Simon & Garfunkel, and jazz albums from the label Blue Note Records. The songs were based on the musical arrangements and how instruments interact with one another, instead of being driven by the melody. The orchestration throughout the album is more subdued than on The Good Will Out. The album opens with the country-soul ballad "The Love It Takes". Danny McNamara wrote it on an acoustic guitar during the making of The Good Will Out, before showing it to the rest of the band, who added music in the style of Frank Zappa. It slowly builds and ends with a guitar solo crescendo. Dale said the band wanted to open the album with a "bold departure" to separate it from The Good Will Out. "You’re Not Alone" is a ballad that is reminiscent of The Good Will Out track "Fireworks", and the work of the Boo Radleys. Richard McNamara showed the band the song during the mixing of The Good Will Out, and nearly put it on that album, until their label pushed to release the album as-is. McNamara said they added the song to Drawn from Memory last as the label told the band they "needed an Embracey track".

"Save Me" shares a similar chord progression as "Everyday Is a Winding Road" (1996) by Sheryl Crow, and touches on gospel music. It was originally known as "Plasterscenic" and lacked a chorus, until they played the song and Danny McNamara sung the first words that came to him, "save me". The piano-driven "Drawn from Memory" opens with several bars of classical chamber music, while it overall recalled the sound of Cave's The Boatman's Call (1997). McNamara wrote the track in Thailand, when its intro section was known as "Barbara"; he later played it for the rest of the band during a soundcheck in Denmark. The band spent several days working on the track to without any success, by which point, Dale worked on the arrangement at his house. The day after, the band were pleased with his changes; he played the part on a Yamaha grand piano with directions from McNamara, which later had to be edited out of the final recording. The Led Zeppelin-lite "Bunker Song" is an instrumental that was done in homage to "Nine Acre Court" (1995) by the Charlatans.

"New Adam New Eve" is a psychedelic track with Eastern-esque guitarwork that the band saw as their attempt to emulate "Song 2" (1997) by Blur. "Hooligan" is sung by Richard McNamara, features a kazoo solo, and is done in the vein of Beck and the Beta Band. Bassist Steve Firth said the band did not want a guitar solo as they felt "they sound really cheesy", so they opted for a kazoo. McNamara said the song dealt with peer pressure, as well as the "happiness comes from focusing on what you have rather than what you don’t have". "Yeah You" channels the sound of Nirvana, specifically their track "Pennyroyal Tea" (1993). It was initially known as "Pavement". Danny McNamara recorded his vocals for "Liars Tears", another ballad, at the end of the garden at Batsford. "I Wouldn't Wanna Happen to You" is a psychedelic pop song with horns during the bridge section. Richard McNamara said it had a "Midnight Cowboy vibe... all major sevenths for that summery vibe". Danny McNamara compared the album's closing track, "I Had a Time", to The Good Will Out cut "Retread". His vocals were lifted from the demo version of the song; it features a clarinet part from drummer Mike Heaton.

== Release ==
"Hooligan" was released as a single 1 November 1999. Two versions were released on CD: the first with "I've Been Running" and "I Can't Feel Bad Anymore", while the second included "Like a Believer" and "With the One Who Got Me Here". The music video for "Hooligan" sees Richard McNamara exploring the Thamesmead housing estate in London. In the weeks leading up to its release, "Hooligan" and its B-sides were made available for streaming through the band's website. In January 2000, the band went on a short tour of the United Kingdom. A documentary on the making of the album was broadcast on the band's website around this time. On 26 January 2000, Drawn from Memory was announced for release in two months' time. The band did a BBC Radio 1 session where they played "Hooligan", "Save Me", "The Love It Takes", and "Yeah You". The music video for "You're Not Alone" was posted on Dotmusic on 28 February 2000; it was filmed in Australia and sees the band doing outdoor activities, such as walking on a rope.

"You're Not Alone" was released as a single on 13 March 2000. Two versions were released on CD: the first with "Brothers and Sisters" and "Happy and Lost", while the second featured "Come on and Smile" and "A Tap on Your Shoulder". They performed "You're Not Alone" on CD:UK without McNamara, who felt ill. Later that day, he was rushed to the hospital where it was found that he had a blood clot in his lung. "The Love It Takes" premiered through NME's website; the band appeared on Top of the Pops. Drawn from Memory was released on 27 March 2000. It was promoted with a small show to members of their fan club, and listening parties and club nights throughout the country leading up to the album's release. The following month, the band embarked on a tour of Europe; they cancelled a show in Austria due to the inclusion of the Freedom Party in that country's government.

Embrace played two shows in Blackpool (with support from Coldplay), prior to a series of festival appearances over the next few months, including Glastonbury, Witnness and Reading and Leeds. "Save Me" was released as a single on 22 May 2000. Two versions were released on CD: the first with "Get on Board" and "Still So Young", while the second included a radio session version and remixes of "Save Me". The music video for "Save Me" was posted on Dotmusic on 9 May 2000; it sees McNamara walking through a wall of glass, before falling out of a building. As he is dropping to the ground, other people in the building are unaware of him. Following this, they embarked on tours of Japan and Germany. A re-recorded version of "I Wouldn't Wanna Happen to You" was released as a single on 7 August 2000. Danny McNamara said they want to "capture a more wide-eyed summery feel", which they were unable to do the first time. Two versions were released on CD: the first with "The First Cut" and "I Know What's Going On", while the second featured "Top of the Heap", and a cover of "3 Is a Magic Number" (1973) by Bob Dorough. In October and November 2000, the band went on a short UK tour.

"Save Me", "Hooligan", "I Wouldn't Wanna Happen to You" and a re-recorded version of "3 Is a Magic Number" were included on the band's first compilation album, Fireworks (Singles 1997–2002) (2002). "Drawn from Memory" and "Save Me" were included on the band's third compilation album, The Essential (2007). Drawn from Memory was re-pressed on vinyl, alongside The Good Will Out and third studio album If You've Never Been (2001), in 2020.

== Reception ==
Professional ratings
Review scores
Source	Rating
AllMusic	3/5 stars
laut.de	3/5 stars
NME	8/10
Q	2/5 stars
Select	3/5 stars

Drawn from Memory was met with generally favourable reviews from music critics. The staff at NME wrote that the album "trawls emotional depths, plays to its strengths, comforts and encourages, strong in the knowledge that sometimes the good really will out". Cam Lindsay of Exclaim! said the album was the "sound of a band starting over", and as the "pressure of delivering a great sophomore album" beckons, "Embrace can be happy that they have done that with this strong and sincere effort." In a guide to the band's releases for Clash, writer Gareth James considered the album "a far stronger set of songs than its much-lauded predecessor". John Walshe of Hot Press said it would be "all too easy" to single out the issues with the band's "brand of stadium-friendly guitar rock, [...] but Embrace have a certain naggingly familiar, gap-toothed charm."

The staff at laut.de saw it as "definitely versatile", and while the tracks occasionally featured an acoustic guitar or piano, it was "not always very spectacular". AllMusic reviewer Ben Davies said the album attempted to rectify a balance between the "Verve-style ballads and Oasis-like raucous guitars" of their debut "by not taking everything to an excessive degree". He added that in spite of its "many creditable aspects", the album had a "lingering feeling that this isn't all it could be". Select's Roy Wilkinson saw it as "clearly a more stylistically ambitious" release than the debut, though the "abiding moment is a bittersweet and familiar one". In a review for Q, John Harris wrote that the "impassioned love song is still Embrace's calling card, though this time the embellishment and orchestration has been toned down". He highlighted "You're Not Alone" as being "somewhere to the right of pallid cliche. As too much of Drawn From Memory proves, it's really something Embrace need to work on."

Drawn from Memory peaked at number eight in the UK. It also reached number seven in Scotland, and number 24 in Ireland. "Hooligan" charted at number 18 in the UK, and number 38 in Scotland. "You're Not Alone" charted at number 12 in Scotland, and number 14 in the UK. "Save Me" charted at number 25 in Scotland, and number 29 in the UK. "I Wouldn't Wanna Happen to You" charted at number 21 in Scotland, and number 23 in the UK. Drawn from Memory was certified gold by the British Phonographic Industry (BPI). Several years later, McNamara attended a U2 gig; upon meeting Bono, Bono told McNamara that Drawn from Memory had been a "big inspiration and influence" on one of their releases.

== Track listing ==
All songs written by Danny McNamara and Richard McNamara.

Drawn from Memory track listing
No.	Title	Length
1.	"The Love It Takes"	5:31
2.	"You're Not Alone"	4:29
3.	"Save Me"	4:46
4.	"Drawn from Memory"	7:00
5.	"Bunker Song"	1:48
6.	"New Adam New Eve"	3:47
7.	"Hooligan" (lead vocals: Richard McNamara)	4:13
8.	"Yeah You"	3:38
9.	"Liars Tears"	3:16
10.	"I Wouldn't Wanna Happen to You"	3:50
11.	"I Had a Time"	5:47

== Personnel ==
Personnel per booklet, except where noted.

Embrace

- Mickey Dale – keyboards, string arrangements, guitar
- Steve Firth – bass
- Mike Heaton – drums, percussion, loops, clarinet
- Danny McNamara – vocals, guitar
- Richard McNamara – guitar, vocals, kazoo, decks, percussion, loops

Additional musicians

- Paul "P Dub" Walton – additional programming
- Shkati Strings – strings (tracks 4 and 5)

Production and design

- Tristin Norwell – producer (all except track 2), recording (all except track 2) mixing (tracks 5 and 8)
- Embrace – producer
- Hugo Nicolson – producer (track 2), recording (track 2), mixing (all except tracks 5 and 8)
- Simon Sheridan – recording (all except track 2)
- Stuart Miller – assistant
- Paul "P Dub" Walton – assistant mix engineer
- Olly Mecock – assistant
- Mary Scanlon – black and white band portraits
- Blue Source – art direction
- Tommy Penton – illustration

== Charts and certifications ==
=== Weekly charts ===
Chart performance for Drawn from Memory
Charts (2000)	Peak position
Irish Albums (IRMA)	24
Scottish Albums (Official Charts)	7
UK Albums (Official Charts)	8

=== Certifications ===
Certifications for Drawn from Memory
Region	Certification	Certified units/sales
United Kingdom (BPI)	Gold	100,000^{^}
^{^} Shipments figures based on certification alone.
