= Tristin Norwell =

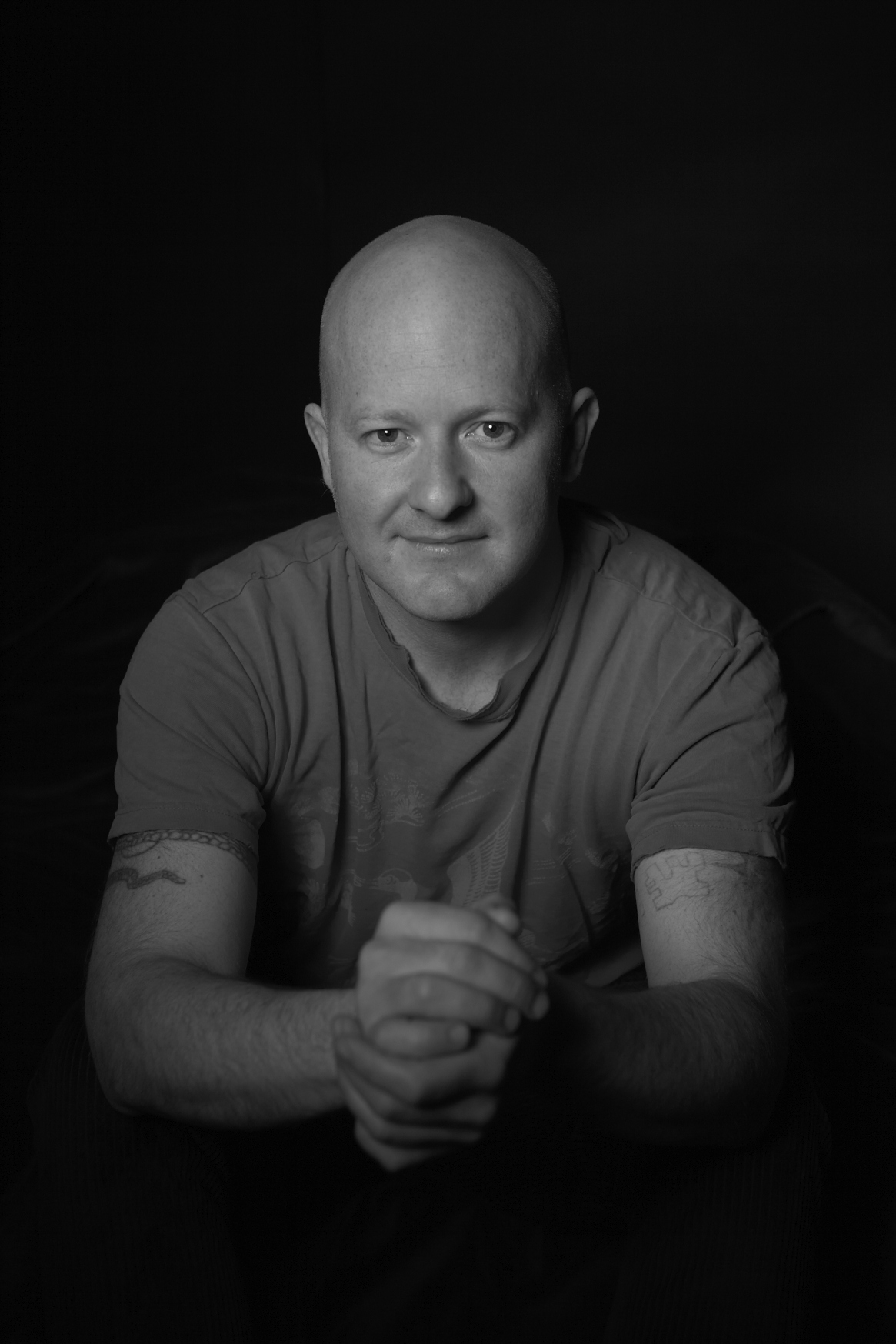
- Tristin Norwell

Background information
- Genres: Film scores, Classical, Electronica, Neo Classical
- Occupations: Composer, score writer, songwriter, arranger, music producer
- Instruments: Piano, Violin, Guitar, Bass, Butone
- Years active: 1992-present
- Label: Cinefonietta
- Website: tristinnorwell.com

Tristin Norwell is a British music composer, producer, mixer, arranger, and musician.

He recorded and mixed the Mercury Prize winning Talvin Singh, album O.K., and has worked with Neneh Cherry, Ryuichi Sakamoto, Madonna, Embrace, Tricky and Cast and recorded Noel Gallagher's tenth Number one album, Who Built The Moon.

He has worked extensively for David Holmes on the award-winning series Killing Eve, the 2015 Ivor Novello winning Yann Demange film '71 and "London Spy", and the film Ordinary Love and for Adrian Corker on the Tim Roth series "Tin Star (2017)".

Among others he scored the feature films Trick Or Treat (2019), the road film Hellbent (2018) and two John Hardwick feature films Svengali and Follow The Money.

His TV credits include the long running series Waterloo Road, Wild at Heart, John Hurt's Whistle and I'll Come to You, the supernatural ghost story written by M.R. James, Kenneth Williams: Fantabulosa! starring Michael Sheen, and Meera Syal's novel Life Isn't All Ha Ha Hee Hee.

== Mal Influence (2015) ==
In October 2014, Norwell released his record Mal Influence, on his Cinefonietta Label, an experimental album melding his classical influences with electronica. Critiques have described it "as tough and breakable as glass...somewhere between chamber pop, the ambience of quieter Aphex Twin" and that "it never adds up to anything less than compelling"
