= Ashes (Embrace song) =

2004 single by Embrace

Single by Embrace

from the album Out of Nothing
- B-side: "Enough"; "Maybe I Wish"; "Flaming Red Hair"; "How Come" (live)
- Released: 15 November 2004
- Recorded: Olympic (London, England)
- Length: 4:22
- Label: Independiente
- Songwriters: Danny McNamara, Richard McNamara
- Producers: Youth, Embrace

Embrace singles chronology
"Gravity" (2004)	"Ashes" (2004)	"Looking As You Are" (2005)

"Ashes" is the second single from English rock band Embrace's fourth studio album, Out of Nothing. This release was publicised by a fan campaign called G.A.T.N.O (Get Ashes to Number One). The song reached number 11. "Ashes" was released to American radio on 1 March 2005. The B-side, "Flaming Red Hair", started life as a cover version of Michael Jackson's "Thriller". Another B-side, "How Come", is a cover of the D12 song of the same name and was originally performed on Jo Whiley's BBC Radio 1 show.

== Track listings ==
7-inch

1. "Ashes"
2. "Enough"

CD1

1. "Ashes" – 4:23
2. "Maybe I Wish" – 5:25

CD2

1. "Ashes"
2. "Flaming Red Hair"
3. "How Come" (live)
4. "Ashes" (video)

== Certifications ==
Region	Certification	Certified units/sales
United Kingdom (BPI)	Silver	200,000^{‡}
^{‡} Sales+streaming figures based on certification alone.

== In popular culture ==
On 14 August 2014, Reading F.C. fans chose "Ashes" as their official club anthem.

"Ashes" can be heard in the film Kingsman: The Golden Circle (2017), where it is implied that Embrace are headlining the Pyramid stage at Glastonbury Festival.

The song was included on the soundtrack of the 2005 video game FIFA 06.

The instrumental version of the song was used for the Goal of the Month segment in BBC's Match of the Day during the 2004–05 season.

"Ashes" was used as the walkout song of Salford RLFC, the phoenix club of the original Salford Red Devils who were liquidated in 2025, for their first game against Oldham on 16 January 2026.
