= Make It Last =

2001 single by Embrace

Single by Embrace

from the album If You've Never Been
- Released: 5 November 2001
- Length: 4:43
- Label: Hut, Virgin, Mobetta
- Songwriter(s): Danny McNamara, Richard McNamara
- Producer(s): Mike Hunter, Embrace

Embrace singles chronology
"Wonder" (2001)	"Make It Last" (2001)	"Gravity" (2004)

"Make It Last" is a song by English rock band Embrace, released on 5 November 2001. It was the second and final single from their third studio album, If You've Never Been (2001), and peaked at number 35 on the UK Singles Chart.

== Track listings ==
UK CD1

1. "Make It Last" (single version)
2. "Fight Yer Corner"
3. "It's You I Make It For"
4. "Make It Last" (video)

UK CD2

1. "Make It Last" (orchestral version)
2. "Giving Forgiving and Giving In"
3. "What You've Had You'll Never Have"

UK DVD single

1. "Make It Last" (live performance at Secret Gig #6—video) – 4:53
2. "Over" (live recording at Secret Gig #6—audio) – 6:23
3. "The Good Will Out" (live recording at Secret Gig #6—audio) – 6:01
4. 4 × 30 second interview clips

== Charts ==
Chart (2001)	Peak position
Scotland (OCC)	34
UK Singles (OCC)	35
