= Wonder (Embrace song) =

2001 single by Embrace

Single by Embrace

from the album If You've Never Been
- Released: 20 August 2001
- Length: 4:24
- Label: Hut, Virgin, Mobetta
- Songwriter(s): Danny McNamara, Richard McNamara
- Producer(s): Ken Nelson, Embrace

Embrace singles chronology
"I Wouldn't Wanna Happen to You" (2000)	"Wonder" (2001)	"Make It Last" (2001)

"Wonder" is a song by English rock band Embrace, released on 20 August 2001. It was the first single from their third studio album, If You've Never Been (2001), and peaked at number 14 on the UK Singles Chart.

== Track listings ==
UK CD1 and cassette single

1. "Wonder"
2. "Anywhere You Go"
3. "Everyday"

UK CD2

1. "Wonder"
2. "Today"
3. "Caught in a Rush"
4. "Wonder" (video)

== Charts ==
Chart (2001)	Peak position
Europe (Eurochart Hot 100)	59
Scotland (OCC)	12
UK Singles (OCC)	14
