= If You've Never Been =

Studio album by Embrace
- Released: 3 September 2001
- Recorded: February–May 2001
- Studio: Soundworks, Leeds
- Genre: Soft rock
- Length: 47:49
- Label: Hut; Mobetta; Virgin
- Producer: Ken Nelson, Embrace

Embrace chronology
Drawn from Memory (2000)	If You've Never Been (2001)	Fireworks: The Singles 1997–2002 (2002)

Singles from If You've Never Been
- 1. "Wonder" Released: 20 August 2001; 2. "Make It Last" Released: 5 November 2001

If You've Never Been is the third studio album by English rock band Embrace. It was released on 3 September 2001 through Hut, Mobetta, and Virgin Records. Within a month of releasing their second studio album Drawn from Memory (2000), the band had started writing its follow-up. Recording took place at Soundworks in Leeds, with Ken Nelson and the band co-producing the sessions, which lasted from February to May 2001. If You've Never Been is a soft rock album that uses more strings and horns compared to its predecessor.

If You've Never Been received generally favourable reviews from critics, some if whom praised the high-quality songwriting. It peaked at number nine in the UK Albums Chart; it would later be certified silver in that territory. Both of its singles charted within the top 40 of the Scottish and UK Singles Charts, with "Wonder" reaching the highest at number 12 and 14, respectively. "Wonder" was released as the album's lead single on 20 August 2001. Preceded by a tour of the UK, a re-recorded version of "Make It Last" was released as a single on 5 November 2001. A European tour was planned; however, it was cancelled, and the band later embarked on another UK tour in early 2002.

== Background and production ==
Embrace released their second studio album Drawn from Memory in March 2000. It peaked at number eight in the UK; all of its singles charted within the top 40 of the UK Singles Chart, with "You're Not Alone" reaching the highest at number 14. By April 2000, the band were in the process of writing material for the next album, which they were expecting to record later in the year. While re-recording the fourth single from Drawn from Memory, "I Wouldn't Wanna Happen to You", in July 2000, frontman Danny McNamara said they had been working on some new songs.

By August 2000, they had drafted a list of 24 possible tracks for their next album. If You've Never Been was recorded at Soundworks in Leeds, with Ken Nelson and the band producing the sessions; they were aided by engineer Mike Hunter. Sessions started in February 2001, and ended in May 2001. Nelson and Hunter mixed the recordings at Parr Street in Liverpool, before the album was mastered by Bunt Stafford Clark at The Townhouse in London.

== Composition and lyrics ==
Musically, the sound of If You've Never Been has been described as soft rock. Danny McNamara wrote the majority of the lyrics as guitarist Richard McNamara took a break to spend time with his newly born child. If You've Never Been features a heavier use of strings and horns compared to Drawn from Memory; the strings were performed by the Liverpool Philharmonic Orchestra, who were conducted by Will Jackson. Danny McNamara referred to it as "probably the deepest [lyrically] – it goes to some really personal places, and is probably the most autobiographical" out of all their releases. The album opens with the sombre "Over", which discusses the end of a relationship, the initial feelings that result from it, and the eventual acceptance. McNamara said "Many Will Learn" gad a "lost at sea feel" to it, which he compared to "Now You're Nobody", a track from their debut studio album The Good Will Out (1998). "It's Gonna Take Time" is an upbeat song that recalled the band's earlier works. The mid-tempo "Hey, What You Trying to Say" features a melodica; Danny McNamara said they tried using a harmonica, though it gave the song "unwelcome 'Roseanne' feel". "If You've Never Been in Love with Anything" evokes the work of the Kinks.

== Release ==
On 4 July 2001, If You've Never Been was announced for release in two months' time. Later in the month, the band held two private shows where they debuted new songs from the album. "Wonder" was released as a single on 20 August 2001. Two versions were released on CD: the first with "Anywhere You Go" and "Everyday", while the second featured "Today", "Caught in a Rush", and the music video for "Wonder" (directed by Grant Gee). Around this time, the band performed at the Witnness, Gig on the Green and V Festivals. "It's Gonna Take Time" was made available for streaming through the website for Visions on 30 August 2001. If You've Never Been was released on 3 September 2001, by Hut, Mobetta, and Virgin Records. It was promoted with club nights across the United Kingdom, leading up to the album's release, a signing session in London, as well as a documentary of one of the two private shows from July 2001.

In October and November 2001, the band embarked on a tour of the UK. A re-recorded version of "Make It Last" was released as a single on 5 November 2001; the DVD version included live versions of "Make It Last", "Over", and "The Good Will Out", as well as interviews. Two versions were released on CD: the first with "Fight Yer Corner" and "It's You I Make It For", and the music video for "Make It Last" (directed by Adam Townley and Simon Atkinson), while the second featured "Giving, Forgiving and Giving In", "What You've Never Had You'll Never Have", and an orchestral version of "Make It Last". The band were due to tour Europe with the Dave Matthews Band; however, they pulled out, citing "recent global events". In January and February 2002, the band played a short, four-date tour of the UK.

"Make It Last" and "Wonder" were included on the band's first compilation album, Fireworks (Singles 1997–2002) (2002). "Wonder" was included on the band's third compilation album, The Essential (2007). If You've Never Been was re-pressed on vinyl, alongside The Good Will Out and Drawn from Memory, in 2020.

== Reception ==
Professional ratings
Review scores
Source	Rating
AllMusic	2.5/5 stars
Drowned in Sound	7/10
laut.de	3/5 stars
Playlouder	4/5 stars
RTÉ	4/5 stars
Stylus	D+

If You've Never Been was met with generally favourable reviews from music critics. Drowned in Sound reviewer Michael Clarke found the album to be the band's "best and most consistent record to date" that "doesn’t base itself on the strength of a few uplifting anthems like their previous work has". John Raftery of RTÉ said the band "show the tenderness that they are renowned for, without their previous tendency towards over-production." Exclaim!'s Rob Bolton wrote that album sees the "more sensitive brotherly music group in top form". Though he said the opening three songs "standout somewhat," the album itself is "consistently good throughout". PopMatters writer Devon Powers said the album focuses on the band's best elements: "contemplative, passionate, mid-tempo numbers that never lose their poignancy". Sarah Bee of Playlouder saw it as The Good Will Out' "with added experience and reduced hubris"; she praised McNamara's voice, calling it "pleasant and confident with just a hint of soul".

Vicky Butscher for laut.de found the music to be "calmer" with "more thoughtful" lyricism. AllMusic reviewer Ben Davies said the album "hit[s] its target, but has lost something along the way", citing the band's "harder edge". The staff at Entertainment.ie wrote that the album was "hardly a radical departure", though the "sense of ambition that permeates [it] is laudable". Dotmusic writer Lisa Oliver noted that while the performance of each song was skilfully done, the majority of the tracks were "let down by excessively mawkish sentimentality". Stylus's Jon Monks was disappointed with the album, as it "lack[ed] the spark of its predecessor or even the conviction" that their debut had. While it was not a "disastrous record" for the band, it was "certainly a step backwards" that "shows only glimpses of their ability".

If You've Never Been peaked at number nine in the UK. It also reached number seven in Scotland, and number 54 in Ireland. "Wonder" charted at number 12 in Scotland, and number 14 in the UK. "Make It Last" charted number 34 in Scotland, and at number 35 in the UK. If You've Never Been was certified silver by the British Phonographic Industry (BPI).

== Track listing ==
All songs written by Danny McNamara and Richard McNamara.

Main CD
No.	Title	Length
1.	"Over"	7:02
2.	"I Hope You're Happy Now"	3:41
3.	"Wonder"	4:24
4.	"Many Will Learn"	4:19
5.	"It's Gonna Take Time"	4:38
6.	"Hey, What You Trying to Say"	5:01
7.	"If You've Never Been in Love with Anything"	4:47
8.	"Make It Last"	4:43
9.	"Happiness Will Get You in the End"	2:47
10.	"Satellites"	6:27

== Personnel ==
Personnel per booklet.

Embrace

- Danny McNamara – vocals, acoustic guitar
- Richard McNamara – guitar, vocals, keyboards
- Mike Heaton – drums, percussion, backing vocals, melodica, vibraphone
- Steve Firth – bass guitar
- Mickey Dale – keyboards, guitar, backing vocals, vibraphone, string arrangements

Additional musicians

- Ben Castle – brass
- Mike Smith – brass
- Pete Wareham – brass
- Jim Hunt – brass
- Darren Wiles – brass
- Andrew Morrell – brass
- Andrew Ross – brass
- Duncan Mackay – brass
- Simon Finch – brass
- Mike Kearsey – brass
- Finn Peters – brass
- Liverpool Philharmonic Orchestra – strings
- Will Jackson – orchestra scoring, conducting, additional arranging

Production

- Ken Nelson – producer, mixing
- Embrace – producer
- Mike Hunter – engineer, mixing
- Bunt Stafford Clark – mastering

== Charts and certifications ==
=== Weekly charts ===
Chart performance for If You've Never Been
Chart (2001)	Peak position
Irish Albums (IRMA)	54
Scottish Albums (OCC)	7
UK Albums (OCC)	9

=== Certifications ===
Certifications for If You've Never Been
Region	Certification	Certified units/sales
United Kingdom (BPI)	Silver	60,000^{^}
^{^} Shipments figures based on certification alone.
