= Gravity (Embrace song) =

2004 single by Embrace

Single by Embrace

from the album Out of Nothing
- B-side: "Wasted"
- Released: 30 August 2004
- Studio: Olympic (London)
- Genre: Indie rock
- Length: 4:40
- Label: Independiente
- Songwriters: Guy Berryman; Jonny Buckland; Will Champion; Chris Martin
- Producers: Youth; Embrace

Embrace singles chronology
"Make It Last" (2001)	"Gravity" (2004)	"Ashes" (2004)

"Gravity" is a song by English rock band Embrace, released as the lead single from their fourth studio album, Out of Nothing (2004). Written by Coldplay, the song was first performed live by Coldplay in 2002. Ultimately, Coldplay frontman Chris Martin gave the song to Embrace, although Coldplay released their own version in 2005 as a B-side to their single "Talk".

"Gravity" was released in the United Kingdom on 30 August 2004. It subsequently peaked at number seven on the UK Singles Chart and earned a silver sales certification from the British Phonographic Industry (BPI) in October 2019. Radio X ranked it among the best indie songs of 2004. The B-side, "Wasted", was originally conceived during the Drawn from Memory (2000) sessions.

== Track listings ==
UK CD1

1. "Gravity" – 4:39
2. "The Shot's Still Ringing" – 3:39
3. "Waterfall" – 5:04
4. "Gravity" (video)

UK CD2

1. "Gravity" – 4:39
2. "Too Many Times" – 3:59

UK limited-edition 7-inch red vinyl single

A. "Gravity" – 4:39
B. "Wasted" – 4:24

== Charts ==
=== Weekly charts ===
Weekly chart performance
Chart (2004)	Peak position
Scottish Singles Sales (Official Charts)	2
UK Singles (Official Charts)	7

=== Year-end charts ===
Year-end chart performance
Chart (2004)	Position
UK Singles (OCC)	142

== Certifications ==
Certifications
Region	Certification	Certified units/sales
United Kingdom (BPI)	Gold	400,000^{‡}
^{‡} Sales+streaming figures based on certification alone.
