= How Come (D12 song) =

Single by D12

from the album D12 World
- B-side: "40 Oz."
- Released: June 8, 2004
- Genre: Hip hop
- Length: 4:09
- Label: Shady; Interscope
- Songwriters: Marshall Mathers; Denaun Porter; DeShaun Holton; Bryan Johnson; Dewitt Moore
- Producers: Witt & Pep

D12 singles chronology
"My Band" (2004)	"How Come" (2004)

Music video
- Video on YouTube

"How Come" is a song by the American rap group D12. It was released in June 2004 as the second single from their second album D12 World. The song was certified Gold by the RIAA.

== Content ==
The song is about the relationship between the members of D12. Eminem makes reference to his relationship to Proof, Kon Artis talks about Eminem and Kim's relationship, and Proof talks about the rift between him and Eminem.

Bizarre and Swift had verses in the extended version, but these were cut from the official release of the song.

== Music video ==
The video depicts members of D12 fighting with Eminem in the Shady Records studio. It shows a detailed strain on the members relationships. They discuss how Eminem rose to stardom, and they can't get a deal. They envy Eminem, but he doesn't think there is anything to envy, the song ends, leaving people wondering, with the members dissatisfied. In the second verse of the song, Kon Artis talks about a time when he claims to have seen Eminem's girlfriend Kim cheating on him. The video ends with a clip of another song from D12 World, "Git Up". The beginning also shows a home video of Eminem rapping at an underground show with Proof and Bizarre.

The accompanying music video for this single is known as "How Come Plus Git Up" and was released in 2004.

== Track listing ==
UK CD single

No.	Title	Writer(s)	Producer(s)	Length
1.	"How Come^{[A]}"	Marshall Mathers; Denaun Porter; DeShaun Holton; Bryan Johnson; Dewitt Moore	Witt & Pep	4:41
2.	"40 Oz."	Mathers; Von Carlisle; Johnson; Holton; Mark Williams; Joe Kent	Trackboyz	4:08
3.	"How Come - Video"	Mathers; Porter; Holton; Johnson; Moore	Witt & Pep	5:24
4.	"40 Oz. - Video"	Mathers; Carlisle; Johnson; Holton; Williams; Kent	Trackboyz	3:56
5.	"40 Oz. - Instrumental"	Mathers; Carlisle; Johnson; Holton; Williams; Kent	Trackboyz	4:05

European CD single

No.	Title	Writer(s)	Producer(s)	Length
1.	"How Come^{[A]}"	Marshall Mathers; Denaun Porter; DeShaun Holton; Bryan Johnson; Dewitt Moore	Witt & Pep	4:41
2.	"40 Oz."	Mathers; Von Carlisle; Johnson; Holton; Mark Williams; Joe Kent	Trackboyz	4:08
3.	"How Come - Video"	Mathers; Porter; Holton; Johnson; Moore	Witt & Pep	5:24
4.	"40 Oz. - Video"	Mathers; Carlisle; Johnson; Holton; Williams; Kent	Trackboyz	3:56

Notes:

This is an extended version of the song, containing Swifty McVay and Bizarre's verses, which were cut off the album version.

== Charts ==
=== Weekly charts ===
Chart (2004)	Peak position
Australia (ARIA)	4
Australian Urban (ARIA)	1
Austria (Ö3 Austria Top 40)	17
Belgium (Ultratop 50 Flanders)	15
Belgium (Ultratop 50 Wallonia)	26
Denmark (Tracklisten)	5
Germany (GfK)	15
Ireland (IRMA)	4
Italy (FIMI)	17
Netherlands (Dutch Top 40)	7
Netherlands (Single Top 100)	9
New Zealand (Recorded Music NZ)	6
Norway (VG-lista)	10
Sweden (Sverigetopplistan)	42
Switzerland (Schweizer Hitparade)	17
UK Singles (The Official Charts Company)	4
U.S. Billboard Hot 100	27
U.S. Billboard Hot R&B/Hip-Hop Songs	68
U.S. Billboard Hot Rap Tracks	18

=== Year-end charts ===
Chart (2004)	Position
Australia (ARIA)	67
Belgium (Ultratop Flanders)	98
Germany (Official German Charts)	99
Netherlands (Dutch Top 40)	56
Netherlands (Single Top 100)	68
UK Singles (Official Charts Company)	97

== Certifications ==
Region	Certification	Certified units/sales
United States (RIAA)	Gold	500,000^{*}
^{*} Sales figures based on certification alone.

== Cover ==
- A cover version was first performed by English rock band Embrace for BBC Radio 1's Live Lounge show. This version is shortened to Eminem's lyrics on the song, cutting out Kon Artis and Proof. The song was released B-sides to their single "Ashes" and on their album Dry Kids: B-Sides 1997–2005. When the video is played for this song, the song often joins onto a shortened version of the D12 song, "Git Up."

== Release history ==
Region	Date	Format(s)	Label(s)	Ref.
United States	June 8, 2004	Contemporary hit radio	Shady, Interscope	
