= Dry Kids: B-Sides 1997–2005 =

Compilation album by Embrace
- Released: 31 October 2005
- Recorded: 1997–2005
- Genre: Alternative
- Length: 73:08
- Label: Hut Records
- Producer: Youth, Embrace

Embrace chronology
Out of Nothing (2004)	Dry Kids: B-Sides 1997–2005 (2005)	This New Day (2006)

Dry Kids: B-Sides 1997–2005 is a compilation album of B-sides by English band Embrace, released on 31 October 2005. It features 18 tracks from singles and EPs across their entire career, including a version of "Blind", an early live favourite which was omitted from their debut album The Good Will Out, as was their Otis Redding-influenced "The Way I Do".

Much time is given to B-sides of singles from the band's fourth album Out of Nothing, including the experimental groove of "Flaming Red Hair", as well as "Feels Like Glue", "The Shot's Still Ringing", "Too Many Times" and a live cover version of D12's "How Come". Dry Kids reached No. 129 in the UK chart.

Nick Churchill of the Bournemouth Daily Echo rated the album three stars, commenting that while the band won't ever "knock your socks off", they're still "worth a listen".

== Track listing ==
1. "The Shot's Still Ringing" – 3:40
2. "Madelaine" – 4:00
3. "Flaming Red Hair" – 3:53
4. "One Big Family" (Perfecto Remix – Long Fade) – 4:42
5. "How Come (Live)" – 3:07
6. "Dry Kids" – 2:45
7. "Butter Wouldn't Melt" – 3:23
8. "Too Many Times" – 3:59
9. "Blind (Road Version)" – 4:17
10. "Maybe I Wish" – 5:28
11. "Free Ride" – 2:32
12. "Feels Like Glue" – 8:48
13. "I've Been Running" – 5:48
14. "Brothers and Sisters" – 3:25
15. "Milk and Honey" – 4:51
16. "The Way I Do" – 4:20
17. "Love Is Back" – 3:39
18. "Waterfall" – 5:03
