= Love Is a Basic Need =

Studio album by Embrace
- Released: 2 March 2018
- Recorded: 2017
- Studios: Magnetic North Studios, Halifax, England
- Genre: Alternative rock
- Length: 43:42
- Label: Cooking Vinyl
- Producer: Richard McNamara

Embrace chronology
| Embrace (2014) | Love Is a Basic Need (2018) | How to Be a Person Like Other People (2022) |

Singles from Love Is a Basic Need
- 1. "Wake Up Call" Released: 16 November 2017; 2. "Never" Released: 17 January 2018; 3. "Love Is a Basic Need" Released: 14 February 2018

Professional ratings
Review scores
| Source | Rating |
|---|---|
| AllMusic | 3/5 stars |
| GIGsoup | 65% |
| MusicOMH | 2.5/5 stars |
| The Skinny | 3/5 stars |
| Stereoboard | 3/5 stars |

Love Is a Basic Need is the seventh studio album by English rock band Embrace. It was released on 2 March 2018 through Cooking Vinyl.

== Track listing ==
All tracks are written by Danny McNamara and Richard McNamara.

| No. | Title | Length |
|---|---|---|
| 1. | "The Finish Line" | 4:00 |
| 2. | "Never" | 3:20 |
| 3. | "Wake Up Call" | 3:31 |
| 4. | "Snake Oil" | 4:32 |
| 5. | "Where You Sleeping" | 4:13 |
| 6. | "All That Remains" | 4:57 |
| 7. | "Rabbit Hole" | 4:56 |
| 8. | "Horseshoe in My Glove" | 3:17 |
| 9. | "My Luck Comes in Threes" | 4:18 |
| 10. | "Love Is a Basic Need" | 6:35 |

== Charts ==
| Chart (2018) | Peak position |
|---|---|
| Irish Albums (IRMA) | 93 |
| Scottish Albums (Official Charts) | 3 |
| UK Albums (Official Charts) | 5 |
