= Thomas Tantrum (album) =

Studio album by Thomas Tantrum
- Released: September 1, 2008
- Recorded: 2008
- Genres: Indie pop, Alternative
- Label: Sindy Stroker's Records

Thomas Tantrum chronology
Work It (single) (2008)	Thomas Tantrum (2008)	Mad by Moonlight (2011)

Professional ratings
Review scores
Source	Rating
Artrocker	link
NME	8/10

Thomas Tantrum is the self-titled debut studio album by English rock band Thomas Tantrum, released on September 1, 2008. It features twelve tracks which include several songs that were previously released as stand-alone singles.

The album was an Xfm New Music Award 2009 nominee.

== Track listing ==
All songs written and performed by Thomas Tantrum.

1. "Rage Against The Tantrum"
2. "What What What"
3. "Work It"
4. "Shake It! Shake It!"
5. "Why The English Are Rubbish"
6. "Warm Horse"
7. "Swan Lake"
8. "Zig A Zig"
9. "Trust Rhymes with Crust"
10. "Mums The Word"
11. "Blasé"
12. "Pshandy"
