= Thomas Tantrum =

English indie pop band

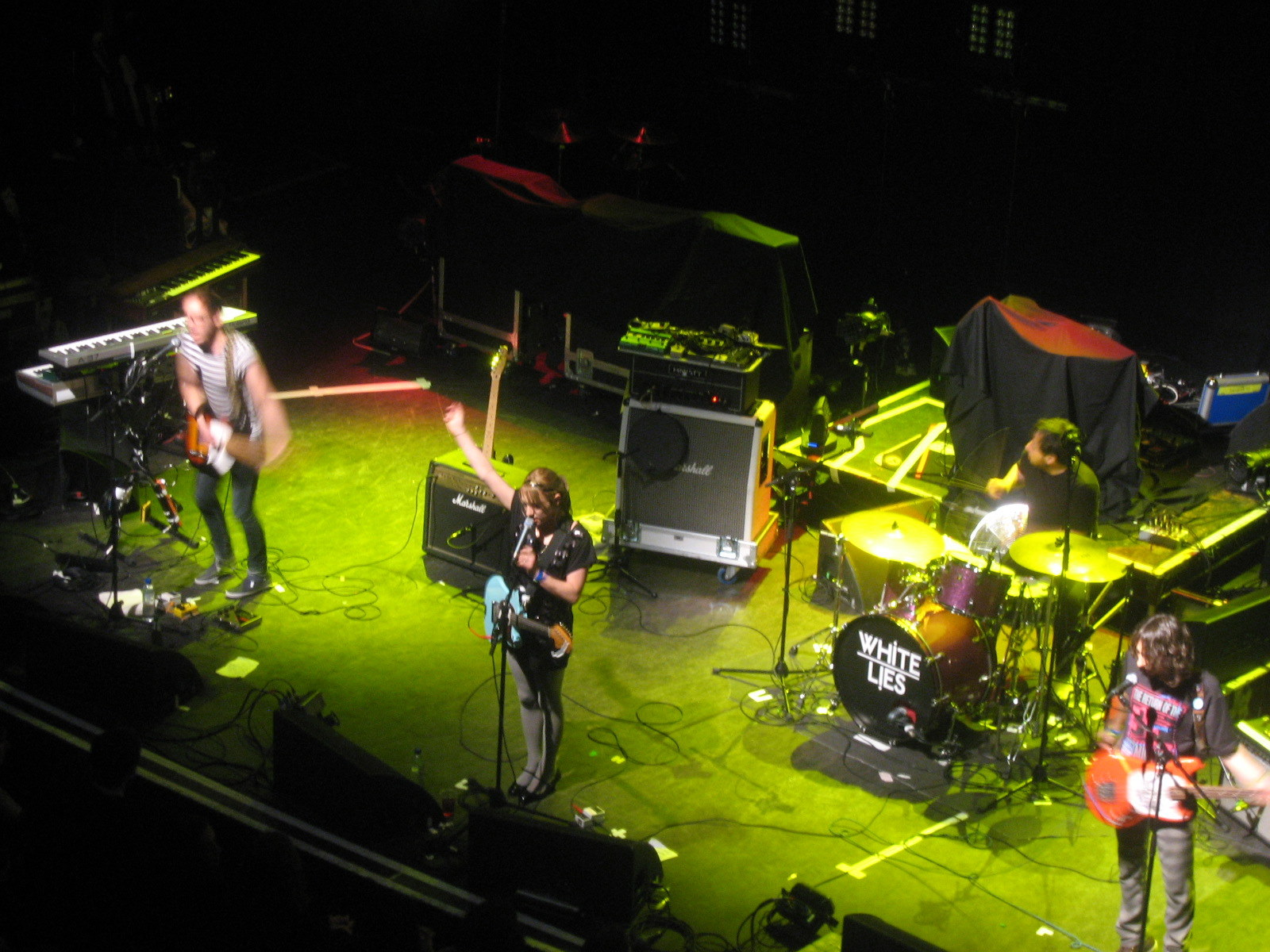
- Thomas Tantrum live at Shepherds Bush

Background information
- Origin: Southampton, England
- Genre: Indie
- Years active: 2006–2011
- Labels: Sindy Stroker's, Cool For Cats, Marquis Cha Cha
- Past members: Megan Thomas; Dave Wade Brown; David Miatt; Jim Shivers; Ken Robshaw
- Website: thomastantrum.co.uk

Thomas Tantrum were an English indie pop band from Southampton, England.

== History ==
Thomas Tantrum consists of Megan Thomas (lead vocals, guitar), Dave Wade Brown (drums, vocals), David Miatt (guitars, vocals), and Jim Shivers (bass, vocals).

English singer-songwriter Lily Allen is considered one of Thomas Tantrum's famous fans. The band gained greater exposure in 2008 after Allen placed them in the "Top Friends" section of her MySpace page. The band spent much of 2008 touring with bands such as The Futureheads, Glasvegas, White Lies and Dirty Pretty Things.

In 2007, Thomas Tantrum performed live at the Maida Vale Studios for BBC Radio One. Their performance at Reading Festival in 2008 was also broadcast on BBC 3 for BBC Introducing. The band were featured on 27 August 2008 broadcast of "In New Music We Trust," a radio program hosted by Huw Stephens on BBC Radio 1. A live version of their single "Work It" (performed at the Reading Festival) was played.

Thomas Tantrum, their self-titled debut album, was released on 1 September 2008.

In a 24 March 2009 update, it was announced via the Thomas Tantrum Facebook page that original drummer Ken Robshaw had left the band as of 10 March. Ian Barnett, friend to bassist Jimmy Shivers, stepped in as drummer for a charity show before the official new drummer Dave Wade Brown was introduced in a MySpace blog entry on 3 April.

The band's second album Mad By Moonlight was released in June 2011 and featured the single "Sleep", which had previously been released on 27 March.

== Discography ==
=== Singles ===
- "Armchair" (25 January 2007)
- "Shake It! Shake It!" (16 November 2007)
- "Swan Lake" (24 March 2008)
- "Work It" (18 August 2008)
- "Rage Against the Tantrum" (10 November 2008)
- "Birdsong EP" (December 2010)
- "Sleep" (27 March 2011)

=== Albums ===
- Thomas Tantrum (1 September 2008)
- Mad by Moonlight (13 June 2011)
