= Richard McNamara =

British guitarist

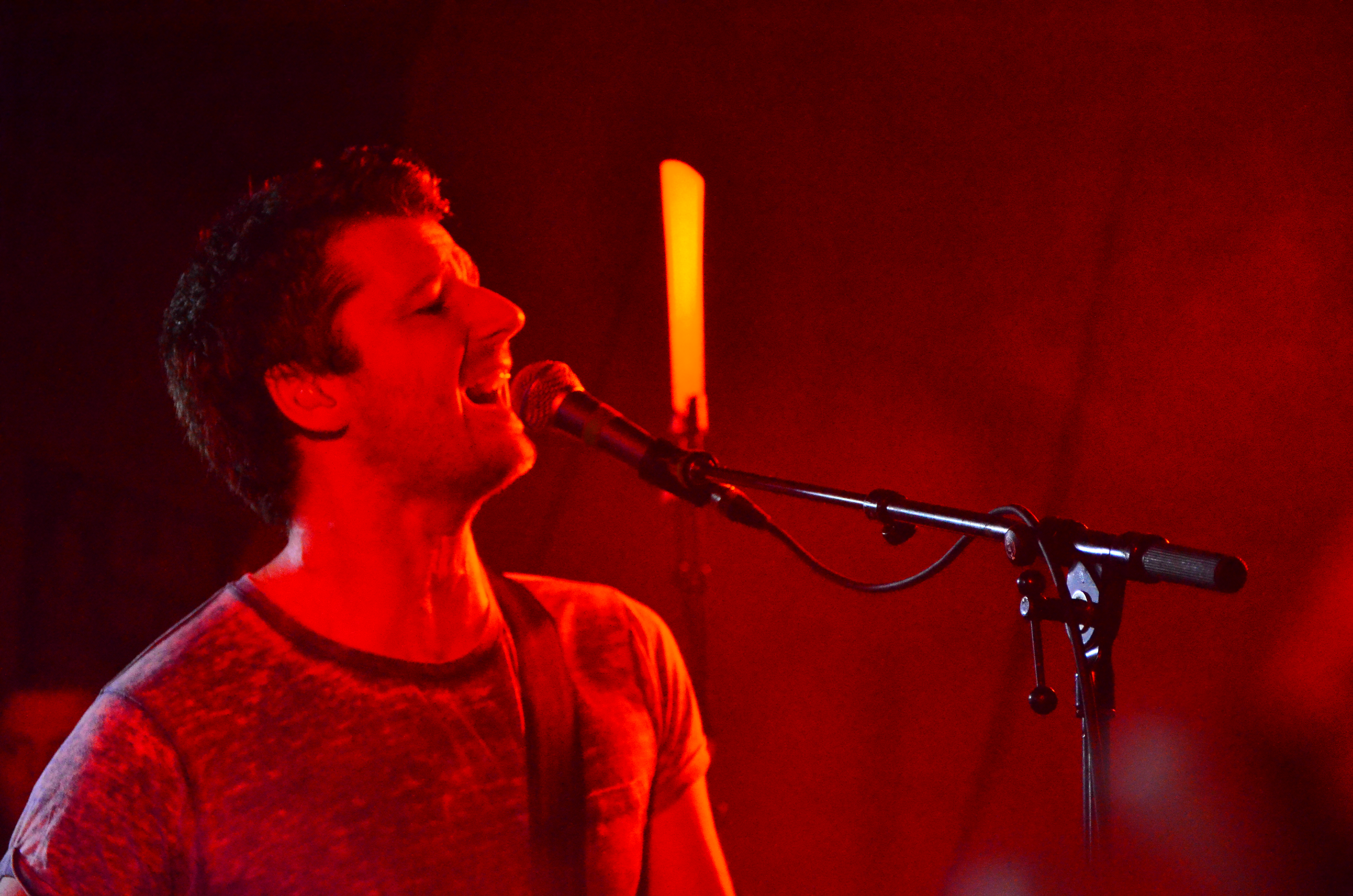
- McNamara in 2014

Background information
- Born: 23 October 1972 (age 53); Mytholmroyd, West Riding of Yorkshire, England
- Genres: Rock, Britpop
- Occupations: Musician, record producer
- Instruments: Guitar, vocals, percussion, keyboards

Richard McNamara (born 23 October 1972 in Mytholmroyd, West Riding of Yorkshire) is a British musician and record producer, best known as the guitarist and co-lead vocalist for Embrace. He and his older brother, Danny, grew up in the village of Bailiff Bridge, Brighouse near Halifax. He is the father of singer-songwriter Ellur.

== Life and career ==
Richard and Danny McNamara attended Hipperholme Grammar School in nearby Hipperholme with their brother Jonathan.

According to Danny, as a child Richard was nicknamed 'Firestarter' as he was fascinated with fire and was always playing with a box of matches.

McNamara was initially the drummer for a thrash metal garage band called Gross Misconduct in his teens. It is believed that Embrace began when his brother barged into a session and started telling him and his bandmates what to do.

Although McNamara has worked with his brother in writing many of the band's songs, he only single-handedly sings a few songs. Most notably "One Big Family" and "Hooligan" which were both issued as singles; also "I Want The World" on the band's début album.

In 2018, McNamara (alongside Embrace members, Steve Firth, Mike Heaton and Mickey Dale) collaborated with Preston-based songwriter, Mark Whiteside [Evil Blizzard] under Whiteside's pre-existing solo project, One Sided Horse. An album ["Between Light and Space"] was recorded and produced by Mickey Dale and released on UK Independent Label, Butterfly Effect.

== Production discography ==
Artist	Title	Credit	Year
Thomas Tantrum	Thomas Tantrum	Producer, mixed by	2008
Embrace	Embrace	Producer, engineer, mixed by	2014
Evil Blizzard	Everybody Come to Church	Producer, mixed by	2015
Starsailor	All This Life	Producer, engineer, mixed by	2017
Embrace	Love Is a Basic Need	Producer, engineer	2018
Embrace	How to Be a Person Like Other People	Producer, engineer	2022
EEVAH	I Didn't See It Coming	Producer	2025
The Rolling People	Outlier	Producer	2026
