= Embrace (English band) =

British rock band

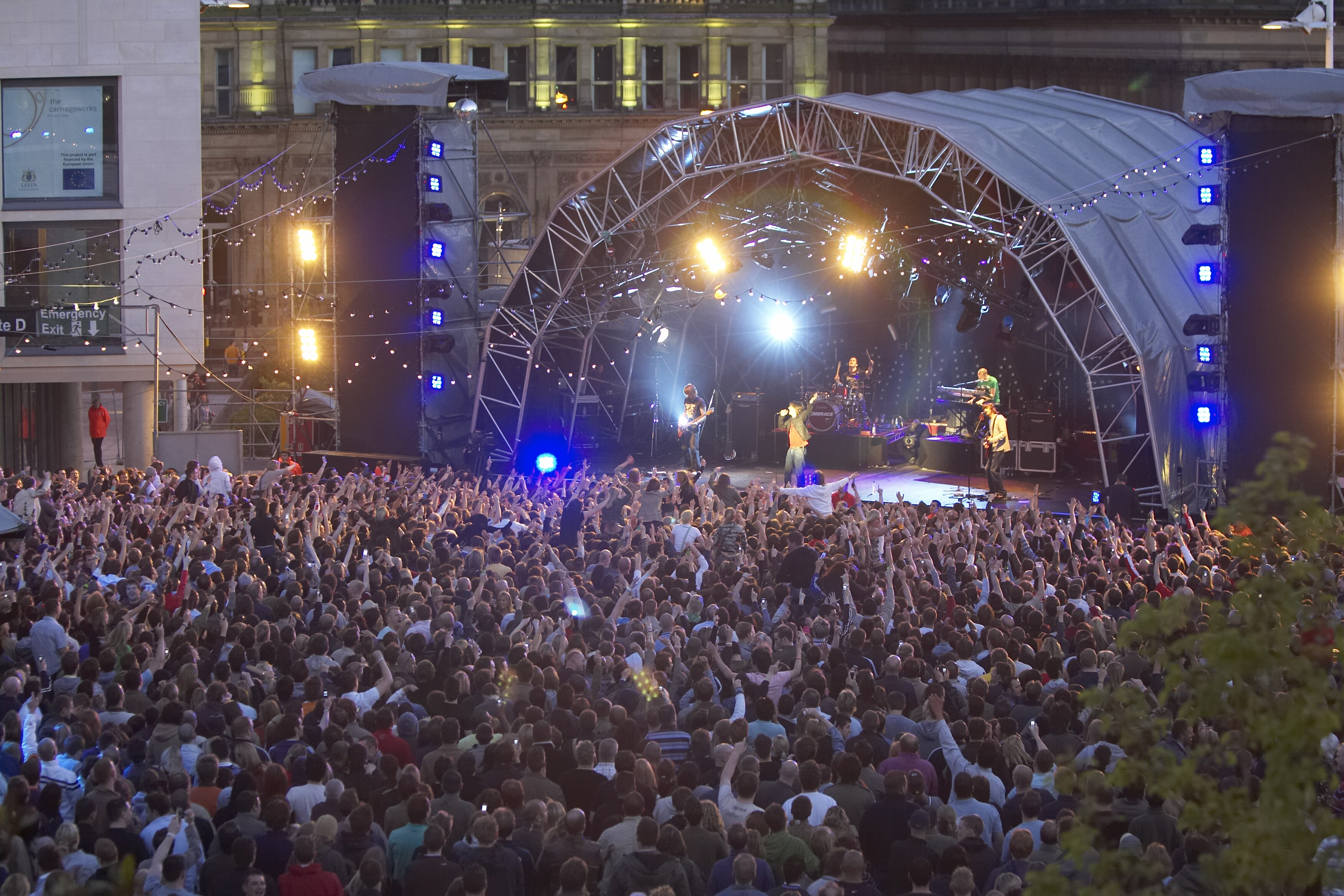
- Embrace playing live in Leeds in 2005

Background information
- Origin: Bailiff Bridge, West Yorkshire, England
- Genres: Alternative rock; post-Britpop; indie rock; Britpop (early)
- Years active: 1990–2006, 2013–present
- Labels: Fierce Panda, Hut, Virgin, Mobetta, Independiente, Cooking Vinyl
- Members: Danny McNamara; Richard McNamara; Steve Firth; Mike Heaton; Mickey Dale
- Website: embrace.co.uk

Embrace are an English rock band formed in Bailiff Bridge, West Yorkshire, in 1990. The band consists of brothers singer Danny McNamara and guitarist Richard McNamara, bassist Steve Firth, keyboardist Mickey Dale, and drummer Mike Heaton. The group have released eight studio albums: The Good Will Out (1998), Drawn from Memory (2000), If You've Never Been (2001), Out of Nothing (2004), This New Day (2006), Embrace (2014), Love Is a Basic Need (2018), and How to Be a Person Like Other People (2022).

== History ==
=== Origins and formation: 1990–1995 ===
The band began in a small outbuilding at the bottom of a garden in Bailiff Bridge in 1990. The McNamara brothers, with Richard playing guitar and Danny, started creating songs with the aid of a cassette recorder and, soon, a drum machine was added. An initial set of songs was written and dropped, then a second set of songs written. Mickey Dale soon joined them on keyboards.

After various auditions, drummer Mike Heaton joined the band. A period of consolidation of existing songs and writing of new ones followed. It proved hard to settle on a name, so gigs were initially performed from 1992 onwards under one-off names; Curious Orange, Christianne F, Shimmer, Lady Bum, and Mesmerise. Eventually they settled on 'Embrace'. Richard was familiar with the American band Embrace, and thought it a good name, despite it having been used already. The band wrote a letter to seek approval from the older band's singer Ian Mackaye who replied that it was alright for the English band to use the same name, though he said that it could possibly cause some confusion. Steve Firth joined the quartet in 1996, forming their current and permanent line-up.

=== The Good Will Out: 1996–1998 ===
The band then recorded a three track demo in a recording studio in Huddersfield, the now closed Beaumont Street Studios, which was sold at concerts in cassette form. This now extremely rare demo consisted of the songs "Overflowing", "Say It With Bombs" and "Sooner Than You Think".

A video was recorded of a gig in Leeds, copies of which were offered for sale. A second spell in a Manchester recording studio yielded some rough mixes, one of which was seen as good enough to be released on a cassette attached to the Leeds fanzine The Expression She Pulled. A single, "All You Good Good People", was released in February 1997 on Fierce Panda Records. After building a following through two further singles (including "Fireworks" and "One Big Family"), their debut album The Good Will Out was released on 8 June 1998 and went to number 1 in the UK Albums Chart. The album achieved critical acclaim as well as success in terms of sales, going gold on its first day of release, becoming one of the fastest-ever-selling debut albums by a British artist, and going on to sell over 500,000 copies domestically.

=== Drawn from Memory and If You've Never Been: 1999–2002 ===
On 27 March 2000, the band released Drawn from Memory, which reached number 8 in the UK Albums Chart. Although the album was supported by a tour during which they were supported by then-fledgling Coldplay, its sales were relatively low, but critical reception was good, especially NME praising the album: "[The album] trawls emotional depths, plays to its strengths, comforts and encourages, strong in the knowledge that sometimes the good really will out.[...]Embrace have finally put their flag firmly at the summit. Embrace covered Bob Dorough's "Three Is a Magic Number" on the B-side of "I Wouldn't Wanna Happen to You" and also released two other 'Christmas' cover versions of the traditional song "Chestnuts Roasting on an Open Fire" and "I Believe in Father Christmas".

Afterwards they quickly recorded their third studio album If You've Never Been, which was released on 3 September 2001. The album reached number 9 in the UK chart. Drowned in Sound claimed: "Embrace have returned with their most compelling piece of work to date. It doesn't base itself on the strength of a few uplifting anthems like their previous work has, instead going for the thoughtful, tender approach. And it's all the better for it." The album was once again supported by an international tour, covering Europe, the US and Australia until the end of 2002.

=== Out of Nothing and This New Day: 2003–2006 ===
They were signed by Andy McDonald to his Independiente Records label and released the album Out of Nothing, which reached number one in the UK in 2004. The 'comeback' single that preceded this album was "Gravity", which had been written by Coldplay's Chris Martin. Danny McNamara and Martin had become friends after Coldplay had supported Embrace in 2000 in Blackpool. The single was a hit, charting at number seven in the UK Singles Chart. Coldplay have since recorded "Gravity" as a B-side for their single "Talk". In 2004, Radio 1's Live Lounge, Embrace recorded a version of the D12 rap song "How Come". In October 2005, the band released their first compilation, called Dry Kids: B-Sides 1997–2005. It features 18 tracks from singles and EPs across their entire career, including a version of "Blind", an early live favourite which was omitted from their debut album The Good Will Out, as was their Otis Redding-influenced "The Way I Do".

The band's fifth studio album, This New Day was released on 27 March 2006, with the single "Nature's Law" being released the week before. The album saw the whole band contributing to the songs. Before this, the McNamara brothers had written virtually all of the band's songs themselves. The band recording twenty four songs in nine days. In March 2006, Embrace were chosen to record England's official football World Cup 2006 song, "World at Your Feet," which received its first radio airplay on 21 April 2006 on BBC Radio 1. It was released on 5 June 2006, and entered the UK Singles Chart at number 3. The first single entered the charts at number two, providing them with their biggest hit. This New Day went straight into the charts at number one and became their third chart topping album in the UK. The band played a new song "Heart and Soul" live, which was expected to appear on their sixth album. A live version of "Heart and Soul" is a B-side to "I Can't Come Down". However they entered extended hiatus afterwards lasting several years.

=== Embrace and Love Is a Basic Need: 2013–present ===
After three years of writing new material for their sixth studio album, the band began production on the album in August 2013. Richard McNamara wrote on the band's Facebook page on 12 August 2013 announcing their return to the studio, seven years after the release of This New Day. They signed with the Cooking Vinyl label in 2013, and showcased some of their new tracks at two gigs in November and December. "Refugees" was released in January 2014 as the lead single to their self-titled album, which appeared in April.

Embrace's seventh album, Love Is a Basic Need, was released on 2 March 2018. Love Is a Basic Need was recorded in the first half of 2017 at the band's own Magnetic North Studio, produced by Richard McNamara. The album's overriding theme is one surrounding love: "Most people remember to eat, breathe and drink, but too many of us forget about love until it's too late. The album is about the realisation that without food or water or shelter you die, but the same is also true of love. We set out to make an album where every song on it would stand up against the best songs we’ve ever written, and I'm pretty confident we’ve done just that," said Danny McNamara.

In 2018, Firth and Heaton co-formed the punk rock band Land Sharks.

The band's eighth album, How to Be a Person Like Other People, was released on 26 August 2022 and became their eighth consecutive studio album to chart within the UK Albums Chart Top 10. The album, which reached number 9 on a sales total of 4,423 copies, was supported by a 10-date UK tour.

== Band members ==
- Danny McNamara – lead vocals, acoustic guitar
- Richard McNamara – lead guitar, keyboards, percussion, backing and lead vocals, production, mixing
- Steve Firth – bass guitar
- Mike Heaton – drums, percussion, backing vocals
- Mickey Dale – keyboards and piano, backing vocals, horn and string arrangement

== Discography ==
- The Good Will Out (1998)
- Drawn from Memory (2000)
- If You've Never Been (2001)
- Out of Nothing (2004)
- This New Day (2006)
- Embrace (2014)
- Love Is a Basic Need (2018)
- How to Be a Person Like Other People (2022)
- Avalanche (2026)
