= Mickey Dale =

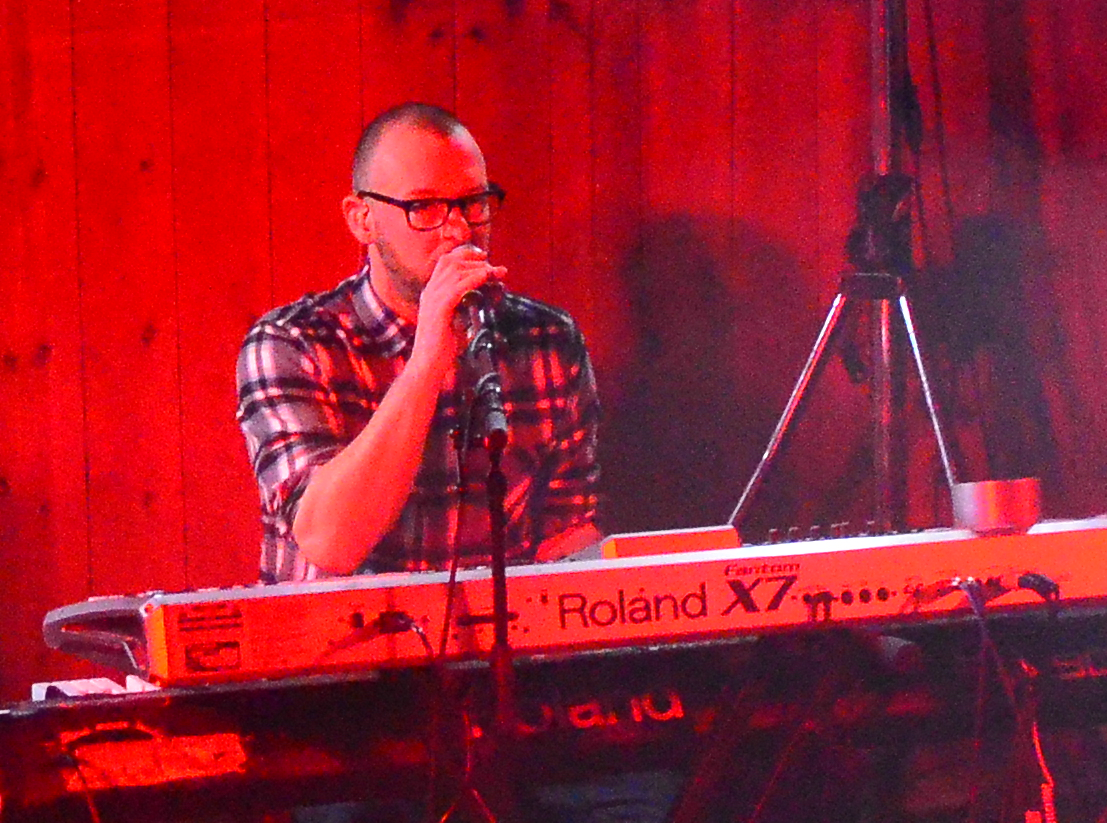
- Dale in 2014

Background information
- Born: Michael William Dale; 22 March 1968 (age 57); Bradford, West Riding of Yorkshire, England
- Genres: rock, indie
- Occupations: Keyboardist, musician, record producer
- Instruments: Keyboards, piano, bass guitar, guitar, vocals

Michael William Dale (born 22 March 1968) is the keyboardist for the English rock indie band, Embrace. He grew up in the Heaton area of Bradford, West Yorkshire.

== History ==
Before joining Embrace, he had previous experience with local bands Poppy Factory, Kitsch, Copingsaw, Lazer Boy and more famously Cud, who enjoyed moderate success themselves, including three Top 40 singles. With Poppy Factory he released one EP and three singles. Their debut, the Fabulous Beast EP, met critical acclaim and was played by a number of radio DJs and stations (it was notably thrashed by Rock FM's Tim Lancaster), though its chart performance did not match industry reception. Next came the 7-inch "Stars", and then "7x7" (composers Cotton/Dale/MacDonald), produced by David Creffield.

An album entitled Good Time, which was promoted as 'forthcoming' on the rear sleeve of "Stars" never saw the light of day and the band's contract with Chrysalis foundered. They self-released a 12-inch promo, "Drug House" before fading into obscurity.

The band's frontman Mickey Dale later rose to fame as the keyboard player for Embrace.

Dale officially joined Embrace in October 1998, just after the release of their first album, The Good Will Out. Dale had been playing live and on record with the rest of the band beforehand, but was an 'unofficial member'. He composed all of the string arrangements for The Good Will Out.

As well as his continuing work as a member of Embrace, Dale has been working as a producer, making records with bands such as Glass Mountain, LELO, Marsicans, Talkboy and Faux Pas. He also owns and runs his own studio, known as 'The Cellar Of Dreams'. In 2018, Dale produced an album with One Sided Horse entitled, “Between Light and Space” which was released via UK Independent Butterfly Effect Label.

One Sided Horse began as a side project of Preston-based singer-songwriter, Mark Whiteside (Evil Blizzard). Dale also performed on the album alongside fellow Embrace members, Steve Firth, Mike Heaton and Richard McNamara.

In early 2019, Dale and some close friends set up a label called 'the boy who left home to learn fear'. Run as a collective of filmmakers, visual artists and musicians, the label released two singles on 7 June 2019:

- LFR1 - LELO - "About A Journey" (digital and 7" coloured vinyl
- LFR2 - Glass Mountain - "Autumn Jam" (digital only)
