= Steve Firth =

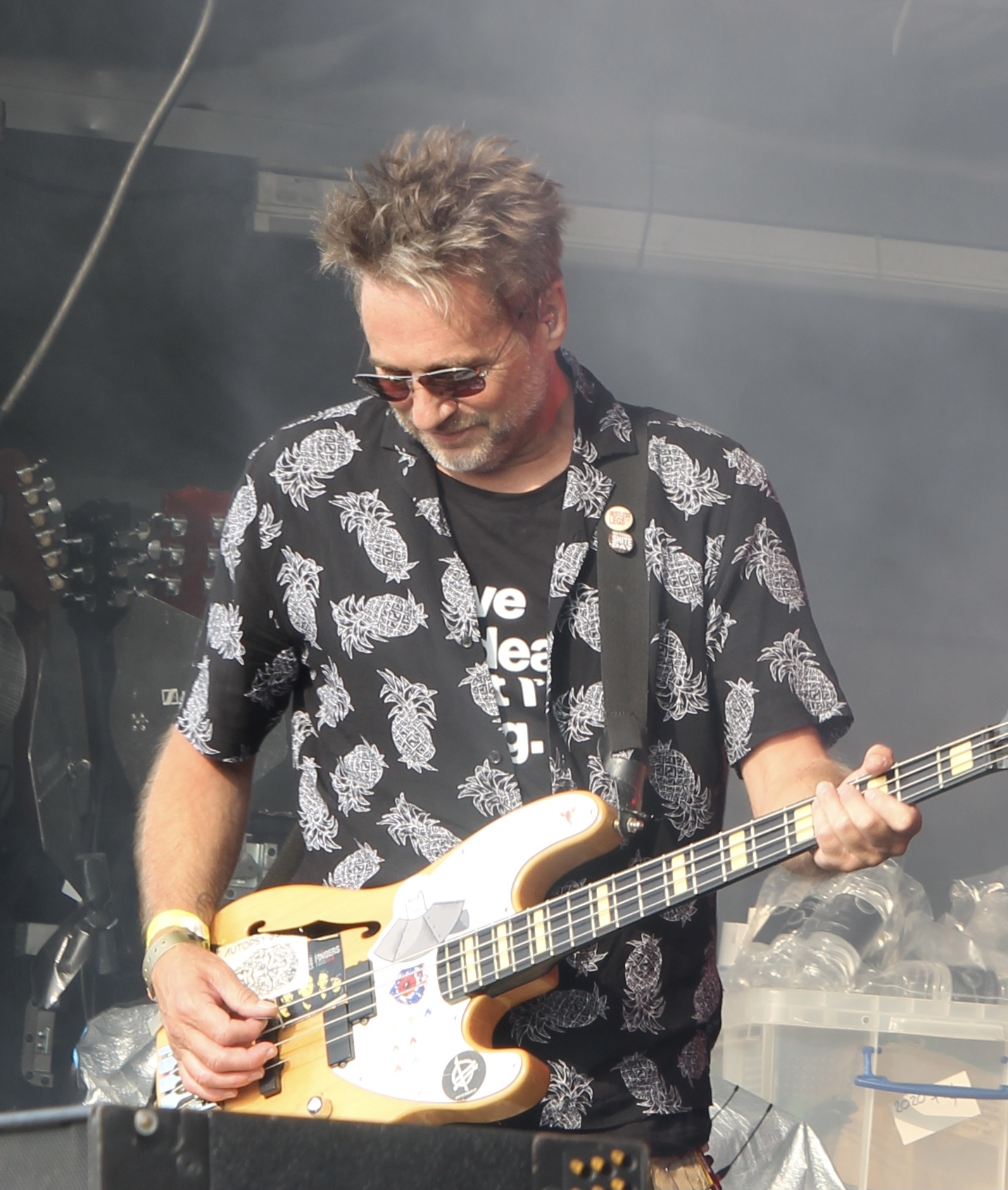

Background information
- Born: Steven Mark Firth; 1 February 1965 (age 61); Halifax, West Riding of Yorkshire, England
- Genres: Rock, Indie
- Occupations: Bassist, guitarist
- Instrument: Bass guitar

Steven Mark Firth (born 1 February 1965 in Halifax, England) is the bass guitarist for the English band Embrace.

== Life and career ==
He studied art at Liverpool University.

Firth admitted that he only found out about Embrace by chance, as he was looking in the music adverts section of a local paper as an old habit and had temporarily given up due to several failures in bands. He replaced the band's original bass player J Senior in 1995.

In spite of the band's affiliation with football through the release of England’s 2006 FIFA World Cup song, Steve is believed to be the only member of the band who is largely interested, and supports Leeds United.

Firth is also a founding member and bassist of Land Sharks, formed in 2018. The band also features Embrace drummer Mike Heaton.

In 2018, Firth joined forces with Preston-based songwriter, Mark Whiteside [Evil Blizzard] to record album "Between Light and Space" under Mark’s pre-existing solo project, One Sided Horse. Embrace members Richard McNamara, Mike Heaton and Mickey Dale also featured on the album which was also produced by Mickey Dale and released on UK Independent Label, Butterfly Effect.
