= List of interments at Forest Lawn Memorial Park (Hollywood Hills) =

Many notable people, especially from the entertainment industry, are interred at Forest Lawn Memorial Park (Hollywood Hills) in California, United States.

== A ==
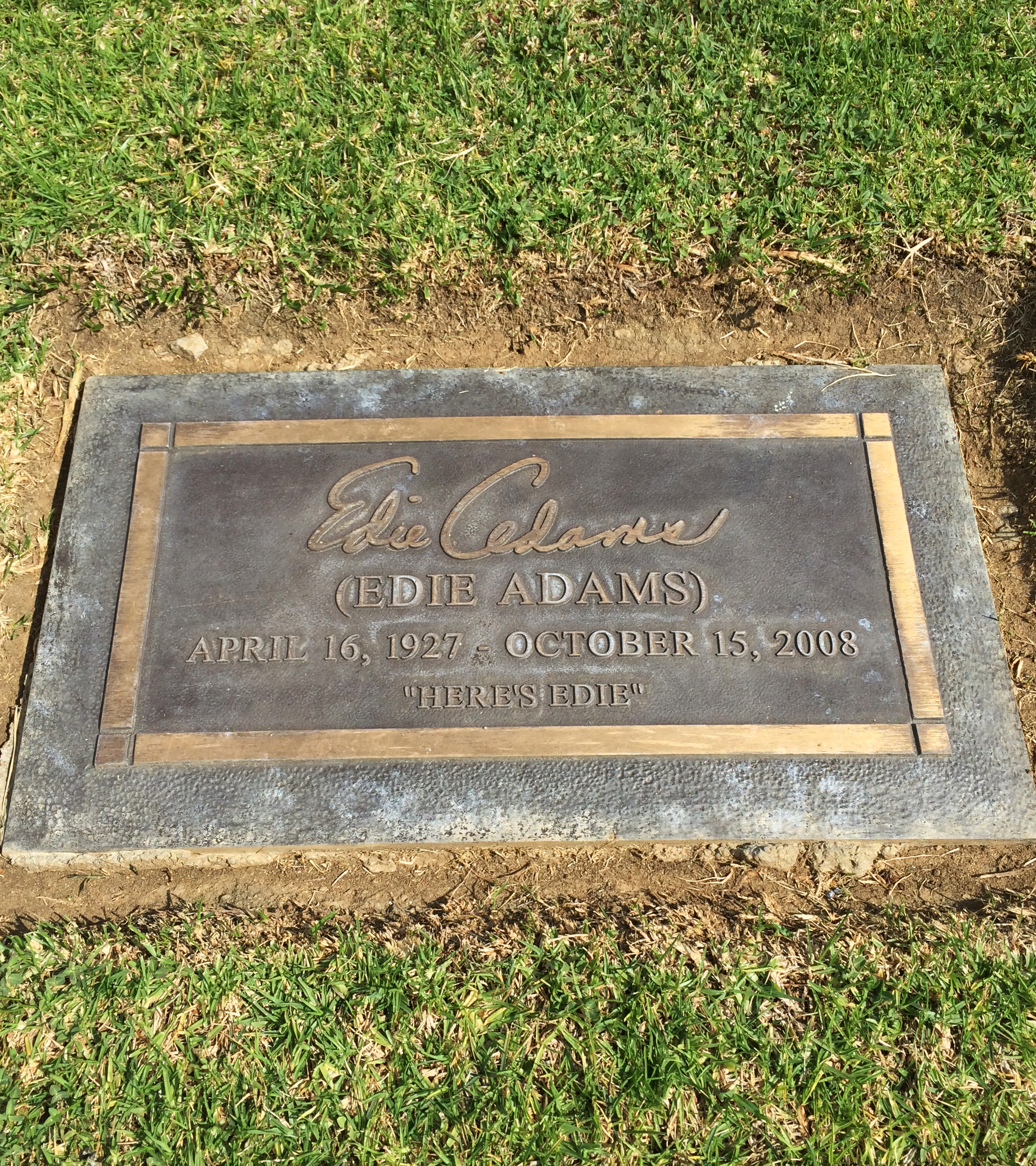
Edie Adams

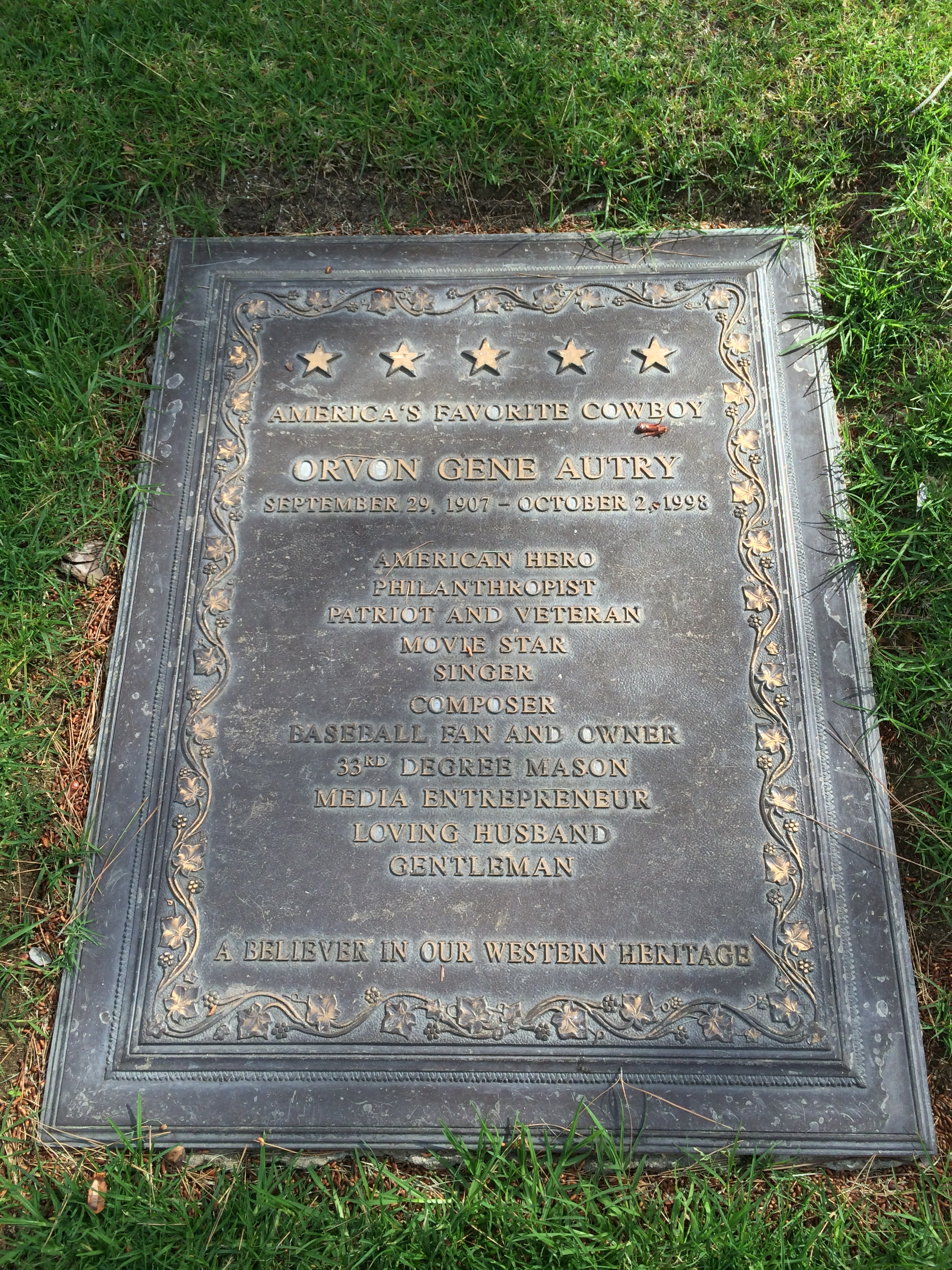
Gene Autry

- Harry Ackerman (1912–1991), television executive producer
- Rodolfo Acosta (1920–1974), actor
- Edie Adams (1927–2008), actress and singer
- Iris Adrian (1912–1994), actress
- Philip Ahn (1905–1978), actor
- Ralph Ahn (1926–2022), actor
- Harry Akst (1894–1963), songwriter
- Robert Aldrich (1918–1983), director
- Irving Allen (1905–1987), producer and director
- Steve Allen (1921–2000), actor, comedian, writer, and television host (unmarked grave)
- Don Alvarado (1904–1967), actor and director
- Leon Ames (1902–1993), actor
- Morey Amsterdam (1908–1996), actor and comedian
- Carl David Anderson (1905–1991), scientist
- Ernie Anderson (1923–1997), television announcer
- Mignon Anderson (1892–1983), actress
- Lois Andrews (1924–1968), actress
- Jack Angel (1930–2021), voice actor
- Michael Ansara (1922–2013), actor
- Dimitra Arliss (1932–2012), actress
- Robert Arthur (1909–1986), producer
- Kelly Asbury (1960–2020), animator and film director
- John Ashley (1934–1997), actor
- Gene Autry (1907–1998), actor and singer
- Luis Ávalos (1946–2014), actor
- Doe Avedon (1925–2011), actress and model
- Patricia Avery (1902–1973), actress
- Tex Avery (1908–1980), director, cartoonist, voice actor, animator

== B ==
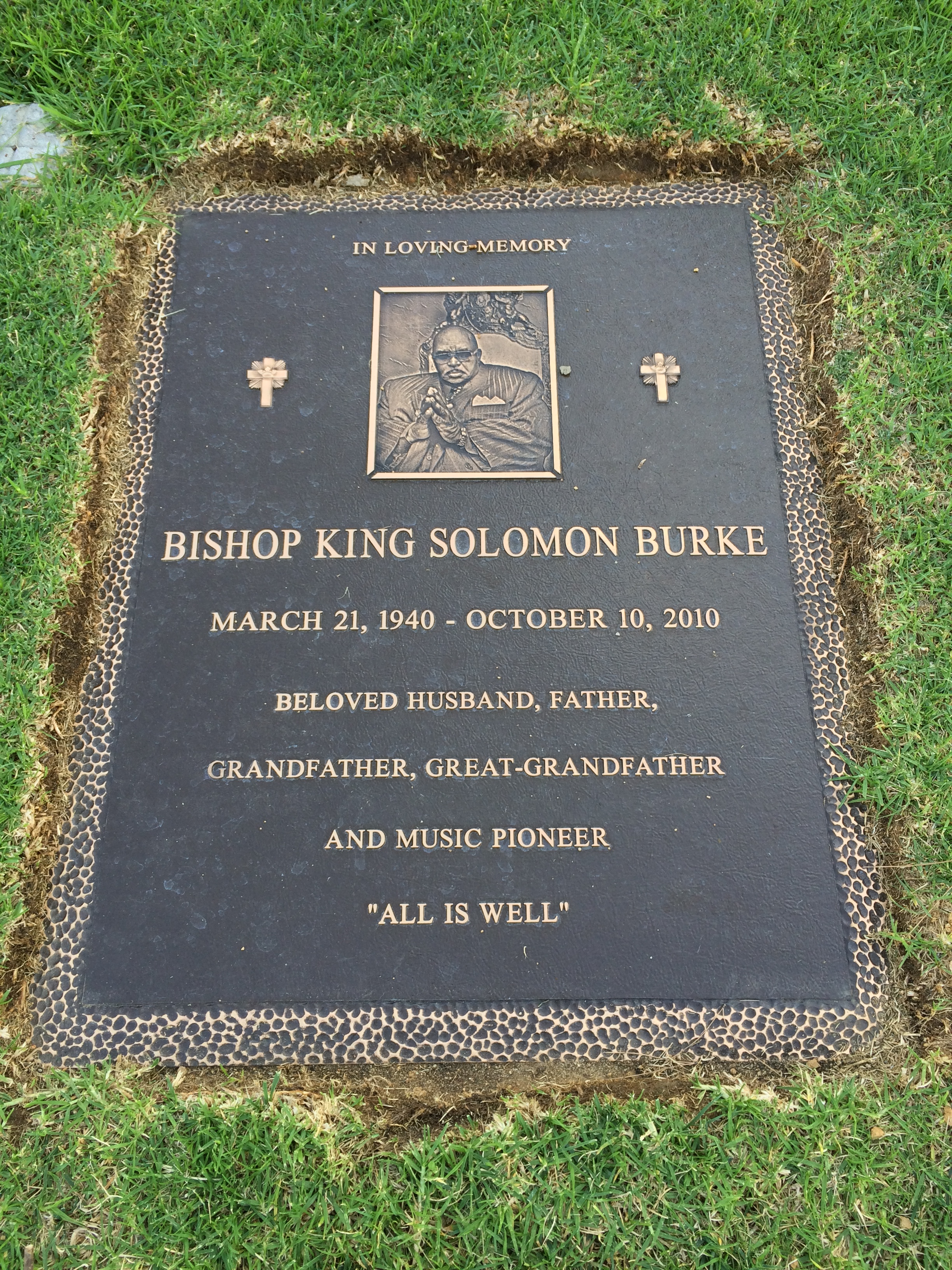
Solomon Burke

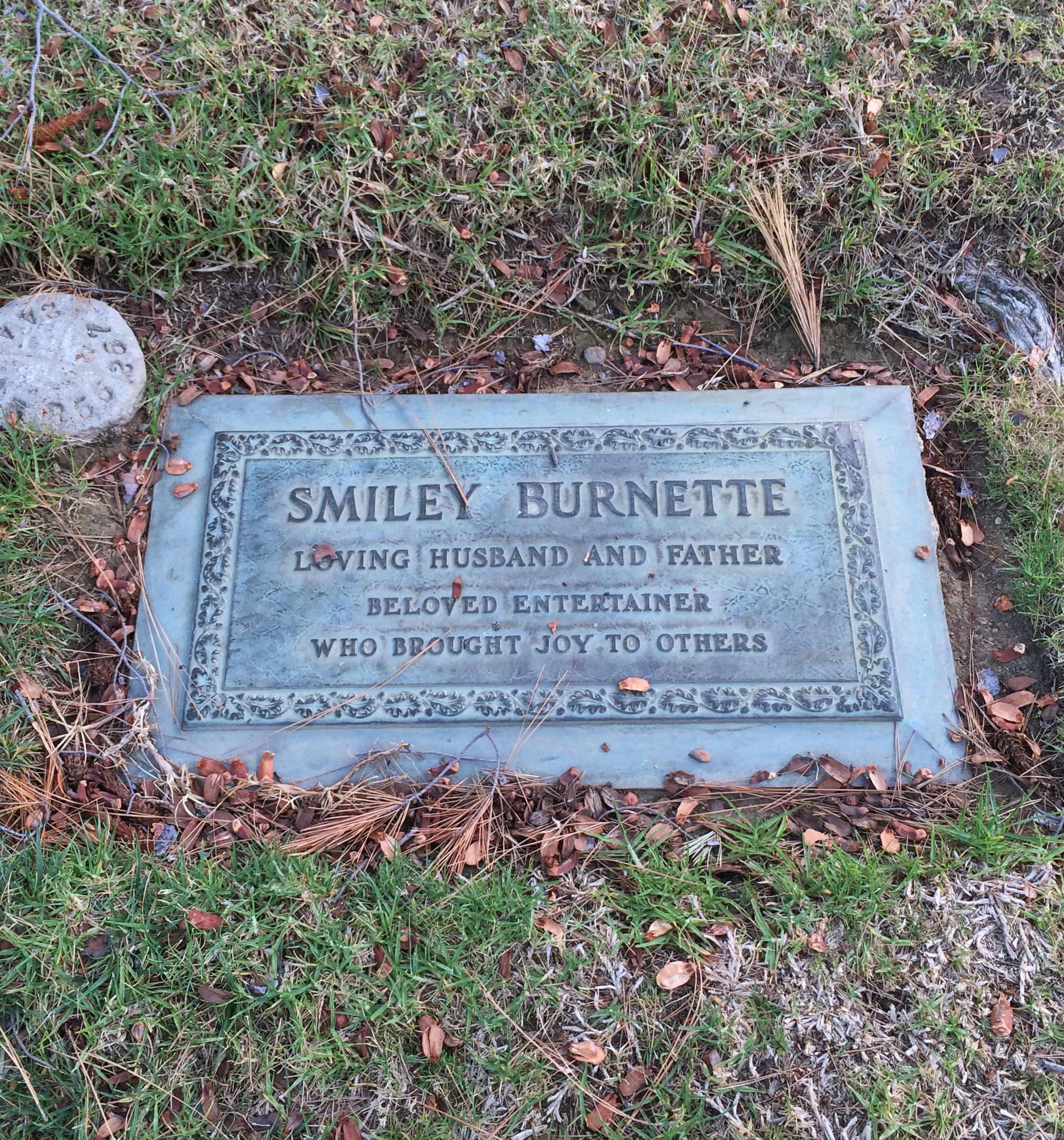
Smiley Burnette

- Art Babbitt (1907–1992), animator
- Lloyd Bacon (1889–1955), director
- Parley Baer (1914–2002), actor
- David Bailey (1933–2004), actor
- Jimmy Bain (1947–2016), musician
- Richard Bakalyan (1931–2015), actor
- Buddy Baker (1918–2002), composer
- Bonnie Lee Bakley (1956–2001), actress and singer
- John Ball (1911–1988), novelist
- Frankie Banali (1951–2020), musician
- Bob Barker (1923–2023), game show host
- Harry Barris (1905–1962), singer, songwriter and musician
- Don "Red" Barry (1912–1980), actor
- Ivor Barry (1919–2006), actor
- Judith Barsi (1978–1988), child actress
- Elgin Baylor (1934–2021), basketball player, coach and executive
- Clyde Beatty (1903–1965), circus owner and lion tamer
- Noah Beery Jr. (1913–1994), actor
- Noah Beery Sr. (1882–1946), actor
- Ralph Bellamy (1904–1991), actor
- Richard Benedict (1920–1984), actor and director
- Brenda Benet (1945–1982), actress
- Spencer Gordon Bennet (1893–1987), director
- Lamont Bentley (1973–2005), actor
- Frances Bergen (1922–2006), actress, wife of Edgar Bergen
- Mary Kay Bergman (1961–1999), voice-over artist
- Robyn Bernard (1959–2024), actress
- Fred Berry (1951–2003), actor/street dancer/ordained Baptist minister
- Gus Bivona (1915–1996), musician
- Bill Bixby (1934–1993), actor and director
- Willie Bobo (1934–1983), musician
- Priscilla Bonner (1899–1996), actress
- Ernest Borgnine (1917–2012), actor (Note: Cenotaph, not grave. Borgnine was cremated after his death.)
- Tom Bosley (1927–2010), actor
- Truman Bradley (1905–1974), actor and television announcer
- Delaney Bramlett (1939–2008), musician
- Chet Brandenburg (1897–1974), actor
- Mary Brian (1906–2002), actress
- Pamela Britton (1923–1974), actress
- Albert R. Broccoli (1909–1996), producer
- Joe Brooks (1923–2007), actor
- Leslie Brooks (1922–2011), actress and model
- Thad F. Brown (1902–1970), former acting chief of Los Angeles Police Department
- Wally Brown (1904–1961), actor and comedian
- Kathie Browne (1930–2003), actress
- Mona Bruns (1899–2000), actress
- Edgar Buchanan (1903–1979), actor
- Mary-Ellis Bunim (1946–2004), TV producer, creator of The Real World and The Simple Life
- Mildred Burke (1915–1989), professional wrestler
- Solomon Burke (1940–2010), singer
- Bartine Burkett (1898–1994), actress
- Everett G. Burkhalter (1897–1975), politician
- Smiley Burnette (1911–1967), actor
- Jerry Buss (1933–2013), majority owner of the Los Angeles Lakers

== C ==
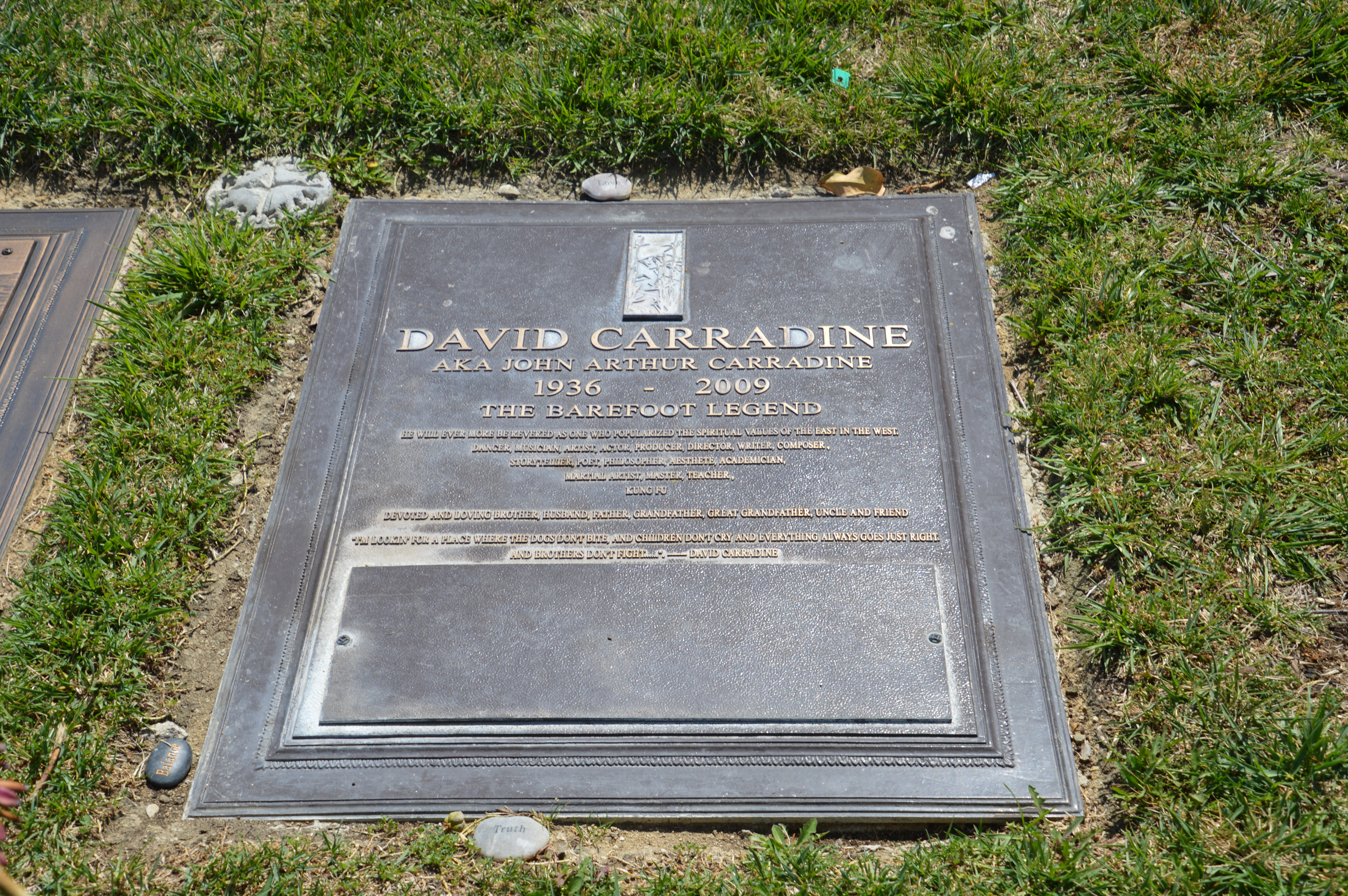
Grave of David Carradine

- Darrell Wayne Caldwell (1993–2021), rapper known as Drakeo the Ruler
- Salvador "Tutti" Camarata (1913–2005), composer
- Godfrey Cambridge (1933–1976), actor and comedian
- William Campbell (1923–2011), actor
- Pete Candoli (1923–2008), musician
- Stephen J. Cannell (1941–2010), producer
- Adan Canto (1981–2024), actor
- Philip Carey (1925–2009), actor
- Frankie Carle (1903–2001), musician, pianist and bandleader
- Johnny Carpenter (1914–2003), actor, director, and screenwriter
- David Carradine (1936–2009), actor
- John Carroll (1906–1979), actor and singer
- Virginia Carroll (1913–2009), actress
- Aaron Carter (1987–2022), singer
- Ted Cassidy (1932-1979), actor (cremated here, but his ashes were buried in the backyard of his residence at Woodland Hills)
- Nick Ceroli (1939–1985), musician, jazz drummer for Herb Alpert's Tijuana Brass
- Michael Chekhov (1891–1955), actor, director, novelist, and theater practitioner
- Warren Christopher (1925–2011), former Secretary of State and Deputy Attorney General
- Ethlyne Clair (1904–1996), actress
- Bob Clampett (1913–1984), animator
- Bryan Clark (1929–2022), actor
- Robert Clarke (1920–2005), actor
- William H. Clothier (1903–1996), cinematographer
- Bill Cody, Jr. (1925–1989), actor
- Nudie Cohn (1902–1984), fashion designer
- Buddy Cole (1916–1964), musician
- Dennis Cole (1940–2009), actor
- Ray Collins (1889–1965), actor
- Roberta Collins (1944–2008), actress
- Joyce Compton (1907–1997), actress
- Christopher Connelly (1941–1988), actor
- William Conrad (1920–1994), actor
- Bert Convy (1933–1991), actor and television host
- Wilbur Cooper (1892–1973), Major League Baseball player
- Rita Corday (1920–1992), actress
- Tara Correa-McMullen (1989–2005), actress
- Jerome Cowan (1897–1972), actor
- Willie Crawford (1946–2004), Major League Baseball player
- Gary Crosby (1933–1995), actor and singer
- Scatman Crothers (1910–1986), actor and musician
- Peter Cullen (1941–2026), voice actor of Optimus Prime
- Pauline Curley (1903–2000), actress

== D ==
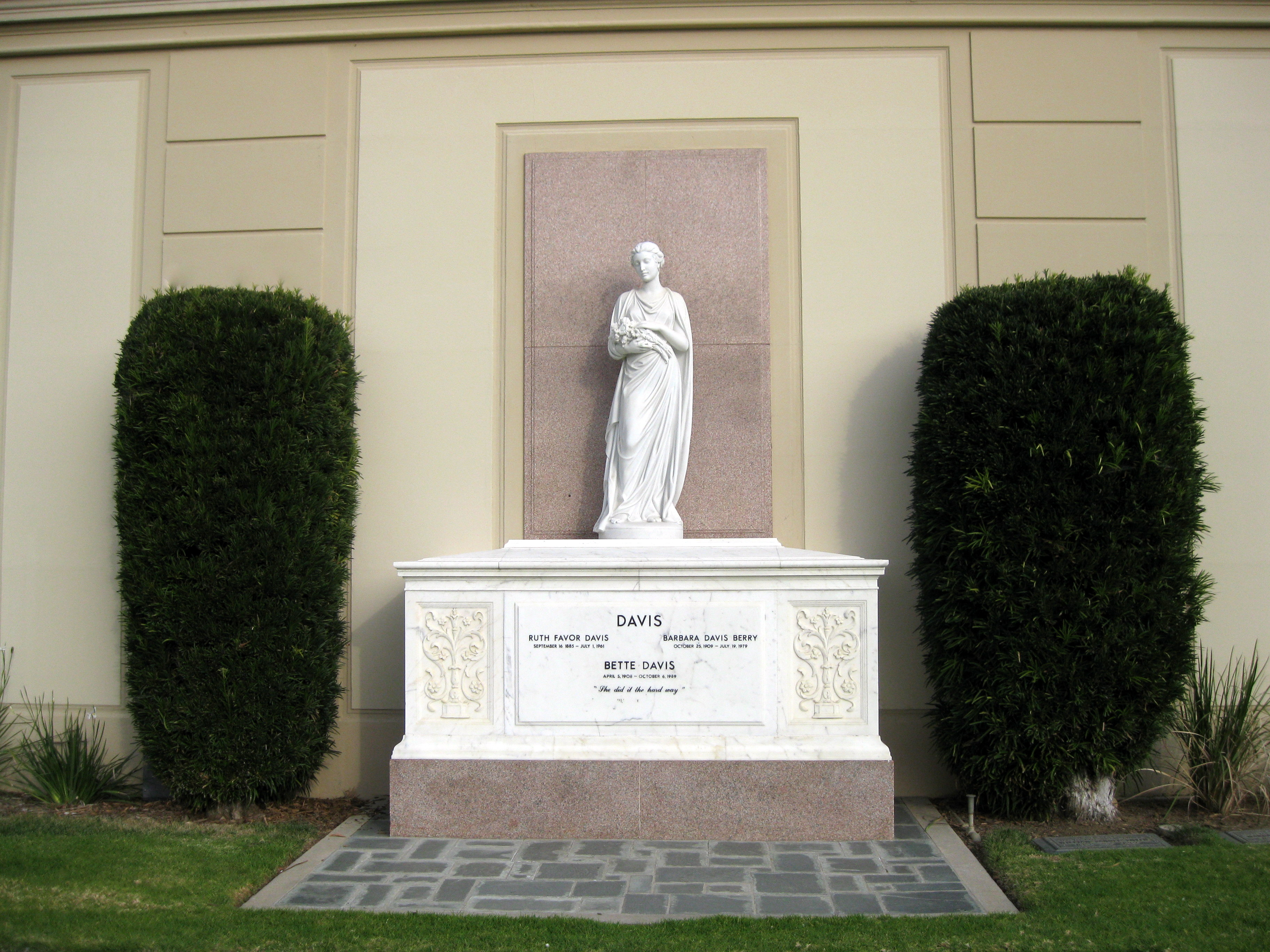
Bette Davis's tomb

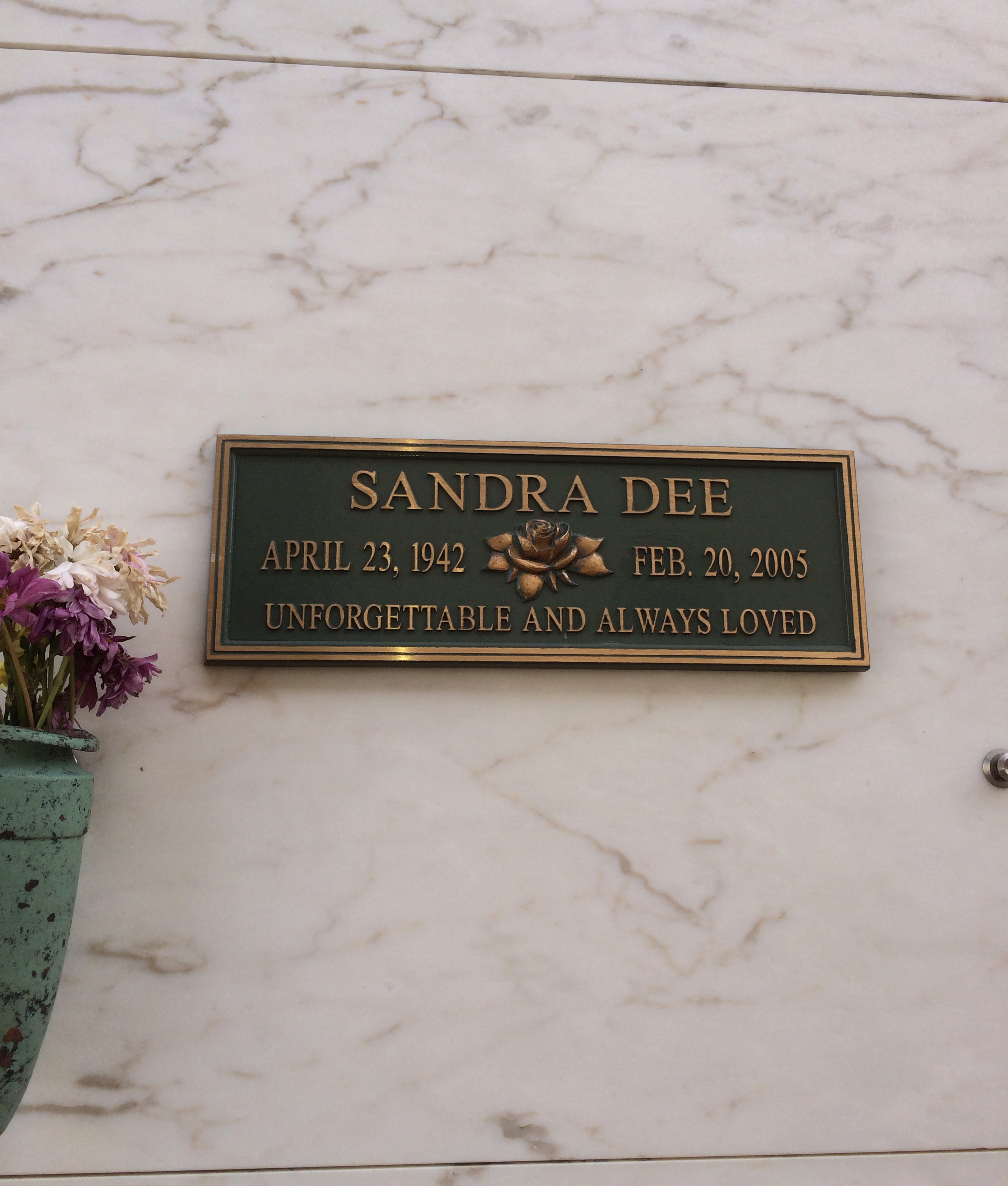
Sandra Dee

- Virginia Dale (1917–1994), actress
- Ken Darby (1909–1992), composer
- Hal David (1921–2012), songwriter
- Beryl Davis (1924–2011), singer
- Bette Davis (1908–1989), actress
- Brad Davis (1949–1991), actor
- Gail Davis (1925–1997), actress
- Rufe Davis (1908–1974), actor
- Laraine Day (1920–2007), actress
- Frank de Kova (1910–1981), actor
- Gene de Paul (1919–1988), composer
- Tamara De Treaux (1959–1990), actress
- Frank De Vol (1911–1999), composer, actor
- Rod Dedeaux (1914–2006), longtime USC Trojans baseball head coach
- Sandra Dee (1942–2005), actress
- Reginald Denny (1891–1967), actor
- Vernon Dent (1895–1963), actor
- Andre de Toth (1913–2002), director
- Ronnie James Dio (1942–2010), heavy metal singer and songwriter, member of Rainbow, Black Sabbath, Heaven & Hell and Dio
- Roy Oliver Disney (1893–1971), businessman, co-founder of The Walt Disney Company
- Edward Dmytryk (1908–1999), director
- Jimmie W. Dodd (1910–1964), actor, singer, and songwriter, host of The Mickey Mouse Club, Mouseketeer
- Jim Duffy (1937–2012), animator
- George Duke (1946–2013), musician
- Michael Clarke Duncan (1957–2012), actor
- Jerry Dunphy (1921–2002), television news anchor
- Leo Durocher (1905–1991), Major League Baseball Hall of Famer
- Dan Duryea (1907–1968), actor
- Devi Dja (1914–1989), actress

== E ==
- Arthur Edeson (1891–1970), cinematographer
- Anthony Eisley (1925–2003), actor
- Julien Eltinge (1881-1941), female impersonator
- Dan Enright (1917–1992), producer
- Josh Ryan Evans (1982–2002), actor
- Michael Evans (1920–2007), actor

== F ==
Marty Feldman

- Richard Farnsworth (1920–2000), actor
- Marty Feldman (1934–1982), actor and comedian
- William Ferrari (1901–1962), art director
- Jim Ferrier (1915–1986), professional golfer
- George Fischbeck (1922–2015), meteorologist
- Carrie Fisher (1956–2016), actress and writer (urn is buried with mother, Debbie Reynolds)
- Shug Fisher (1907–1984), actor, singer and songwriter
- Robert Florey (1900–1979), director
- Tony Fontane (1925–1974), singer
- Ruth Foster (1920–2012), actress
- Robert Charles Francis (1930–1955), actor
- Albert Frankel (1868–1957), architect
- Melvin Franklin (1942–1995), singer and member of The Temptations
- Irwin Franklyn (1904–1966), publicist, writer, film director, film producer
- Mona Freeman (1926–2014), actress
- Milton Frome (1909–1989), actor
- Bobby Fuller (1942–1966), singer

== G ==
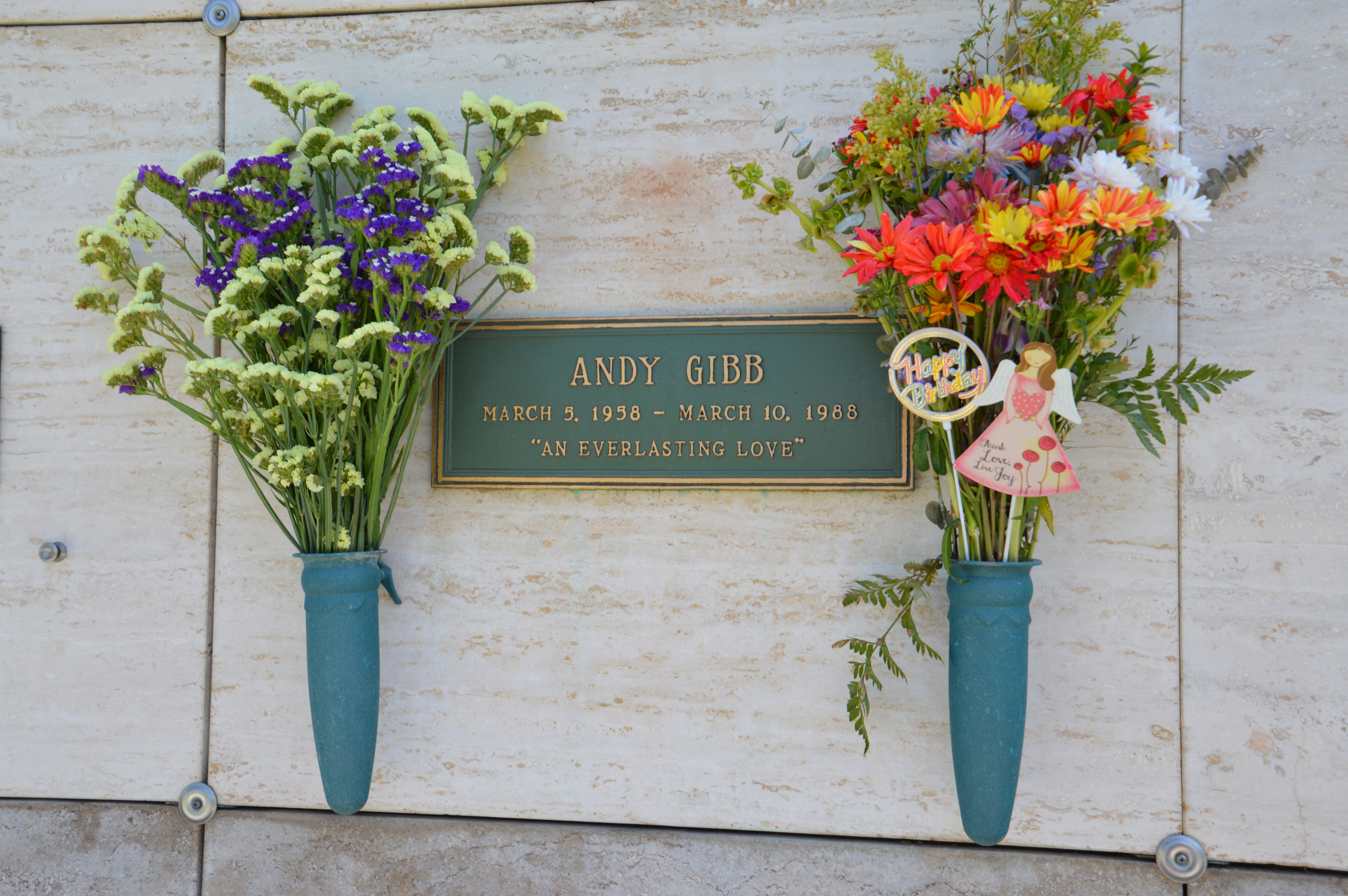
Grave of Andy Gibb

- Reginald Gardiner (1903–1980), actor
- Michael Garrison (1922–1966), producer
- Mort Garson (1924–2008), composer
- Willie Garson (1964–2021), actor
- Frankie Gaye (1941–2001), singer
- Wally George (1931–2003), television host
- Andy Gibb (1958–1988), singer
- Hughie Gibb (1916–1992), bandleader
- Paul Gilbert (1918–1976), actor
- Peggy Gilbert (1905–2007), musician
- Haven Gillespie (1888–1975), songwriter
- Clarence Gilyard (1955–2022), actor, author and educator
- Roger Gimbel (1925–2011), producer
- Bob Givens (1918-2017), animator, character designer, and layout artist
- Joel Goldsmith (1957–2012), composer
- Claude Gordon (1916–1996), trumpeter
- Floyd Gottfredson (1905–1986), Disney cartoonist
- Alfred J. Goulding (1885–1972), director and screenwriter
- Earl Grant (1931–1970), musician
- R. B. Greaves (1943–2012), singer
- Howard Greenfield (1936–1986), songwriter

== H ==
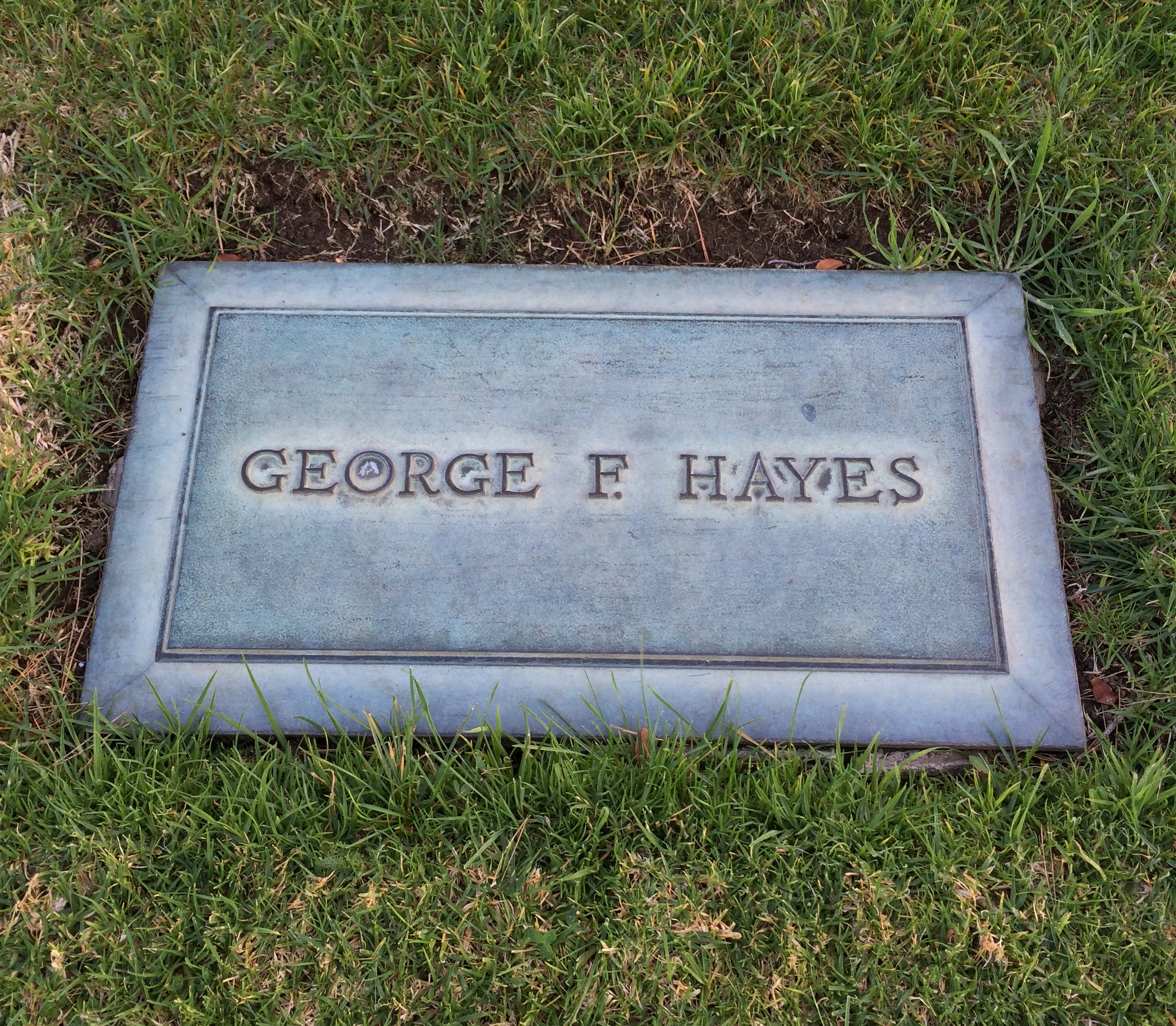
George "Gabby" Hayes

- Hard Boiled Haggerty (1925–2004), professional wrestler
- Sevil Hajiyeva (1968–2000), Azerbaijani singer
- Barbara Hale (1922–2017), actress
- Monte Hale (1919–2009), actor and singer
- Jon Hall (1915–1979), actor
- Porter Hall (1888–1953), actor
- Thurston Hall (1882–1958), actor
- Stuart Hamblen (1908–1989), actor, singer, and songwriter
- Thomas F. Hamilton (1894–1969), founder of the Hamilton Standard propeller company
- John Hancock (1941–1992), actor
- Jack Hannah (1913–1994), animator
- Ben Hardaway (1895–1957), animator and voice-over artist
- Ann Harding (1902–1981), actress
- Bob Hastings (1925–2014), actor
- Marvin Hatley (1905–1986), composer
- George "Gabby" Hayes (1885–1969), actor
- Jim Healy (1923–1994), sports commentator
- Neal Hefti (1922–2008), composer
- Horace Heidt (1901–1986), bandleader
- Wanda Hendrix (1928–1981), actress
- Buck Henry (1930–2020), actor, director and screenwriter
- Maxine Elliott Hicks (1904–2000), actress
- Higgins (1957–1975), dog actor (urn is buried with trainer, Frank Inn)
- James Day Hodgson (1915–2012), politician
- Rich Hogan (1913-1981), cartoon screenwriter
- John C. Holland (1893–1970), Los Angeles City Council member, 1943–67
- Red Holloway (1927–2012), musician
- Sol Hoʻopiʻi (1902–1953), musician
- Gladys Horton (1945–2011), singer and vocalist
- Nipsey Hussle (1985–2019), musician
- Michael Hutchence (1960–1997), musician, frontman of INXS

== I ==
- James Ingram (1952–2019), musician, singer and songwriter
- Rex Ingram (1895–1969), actor
- Frank Inn (1916–2002), animal trainer
- Jill Ireland (1936–1990), actress
- Ub Iwerks (1901–1971), animator

== J ==
- James Jacks (1947–2014), film producer
- Tito Jackson (1953–2024), singer, songwriter, musician
- Dennis James (1917–1997), actor and television host
- Al Jarreau (1940–2017), singer and musician
- Charles Jarrott (1927–2011), director
- Howard Jarvis (1903–1986), political activist
- Sybil Jason (1927–2011), child actress
- Tony Jay (1933–2006), actor and voice-over artist
- Kelly Johnson (1910–1990), aviation engineer
- I. Stanford Jolley (1900–1978), actor
- Mickey Jones (1941–2018), drummer and actor
- Allyn Joslyn (1901–1981), actor

== K ==
Buster Keaton

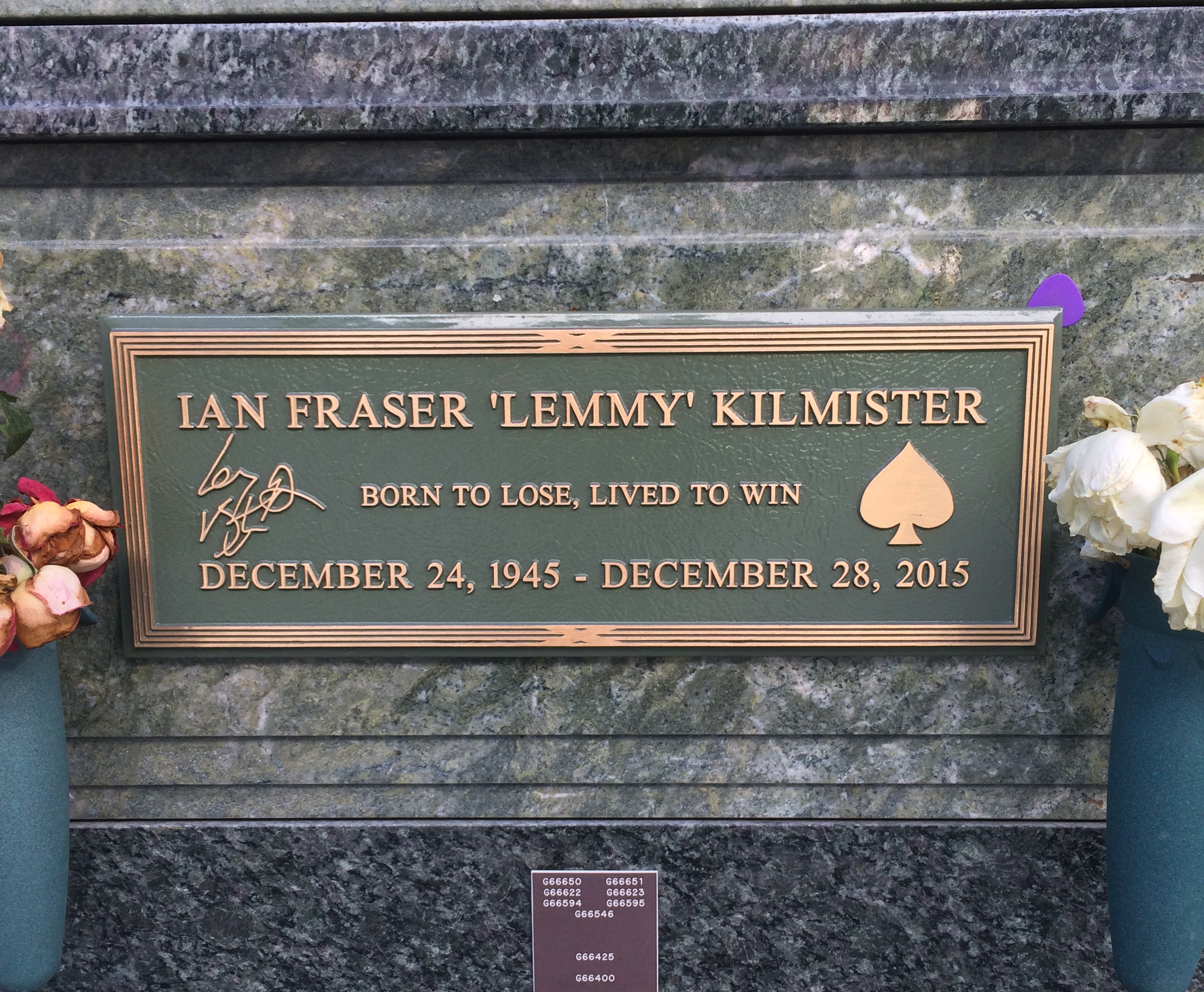
Lemmy Kilmister

- Dick Kallman (1933–1980), actor
- Bob Kane (1915–1998), comic book artist
- Stacy Keach Sr. (1914–2003), actor
- Joseph Kearns (1907–1962), actor
- Buster Keaton (1895–1966), actor and comedian
- Jack Kehoe (1934–2020), actor
- Adolf Keller (1872–1963), theologian and writer
- Lemmy Kilmister (1945–2015), musician, singer and songwriter of Motörhead.
- Lincoln Kilpatrick (1932–2004), actor (unmarked grave)
- Peter King (1914–1982), composer
- Rodney King (1965–2012)
- Winrich Kolbe (1940–2012), German-American television director
- James Komack (1924–1997), TV producer, screenwriter, director and actor
- Ernie Kovacs (1919–1962), actor and comedian
- Helen Barbara Kruger (1913–2006), fashion designer
- Otto Kruger (1885–1974), actor
- Kay E. Kuter (1925–2003), actor

== L ==
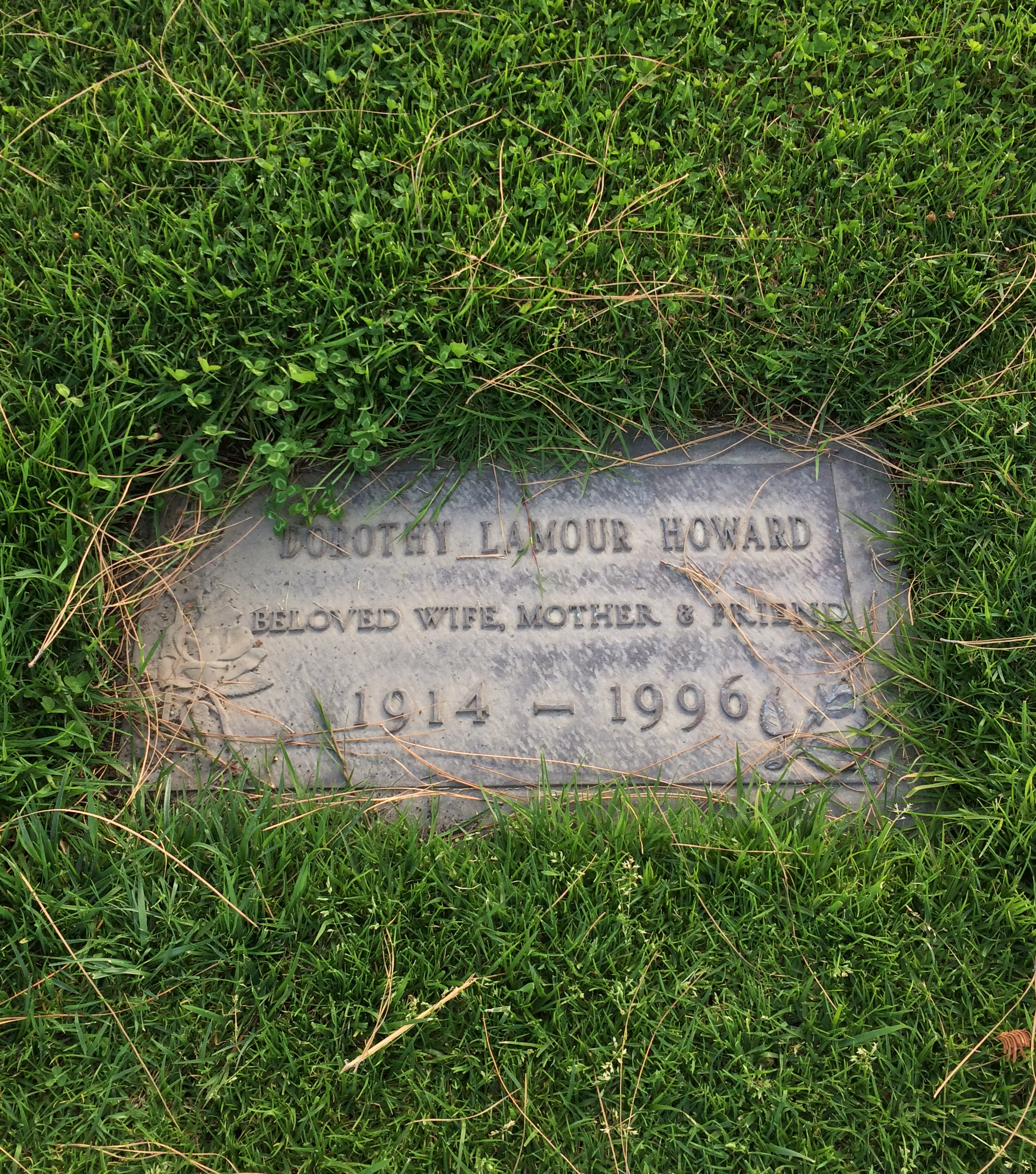
Dorothy Lamour

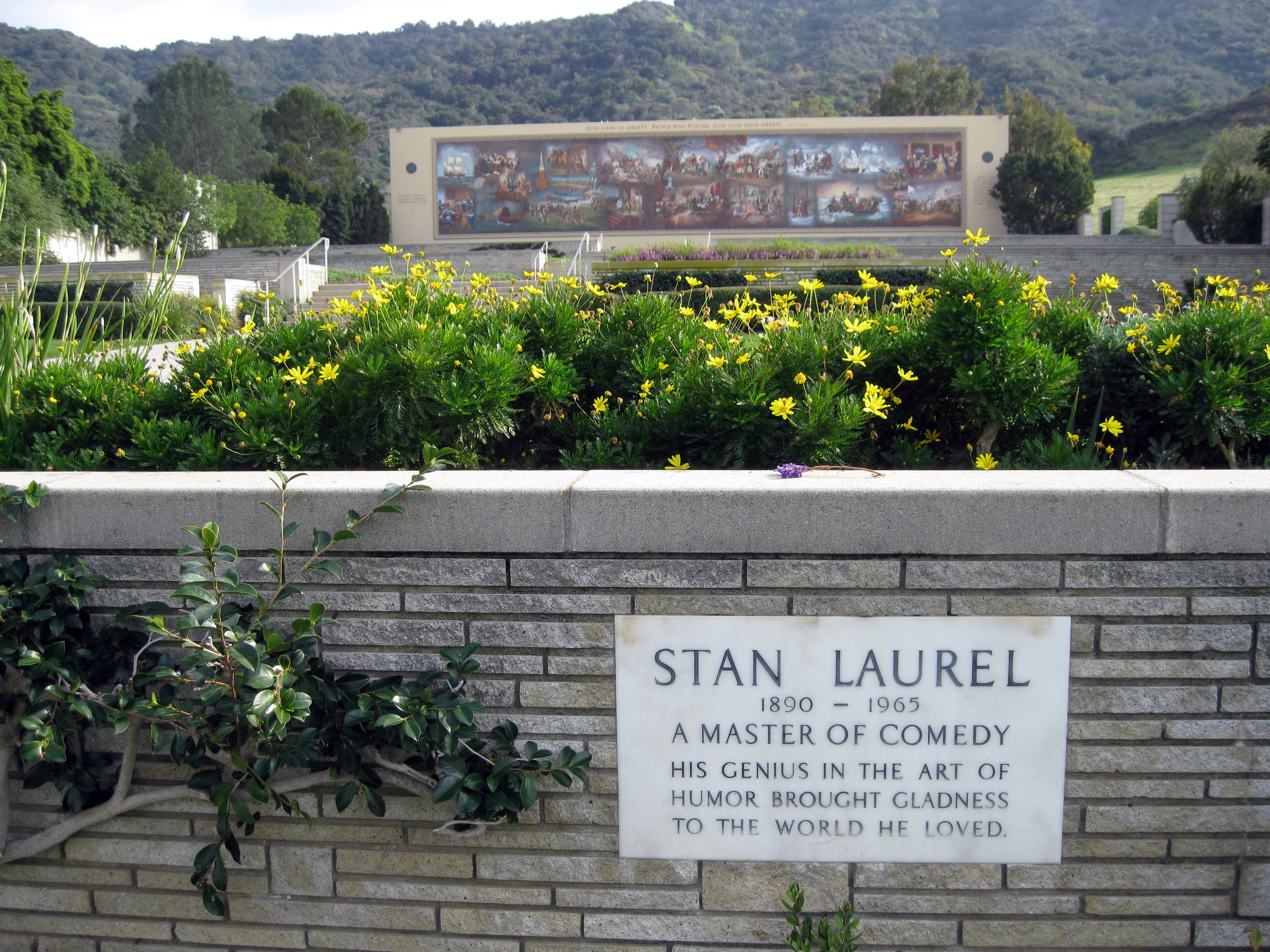
Stan Laurel's memorial marker, with the Birth of Liberty mosaic in background

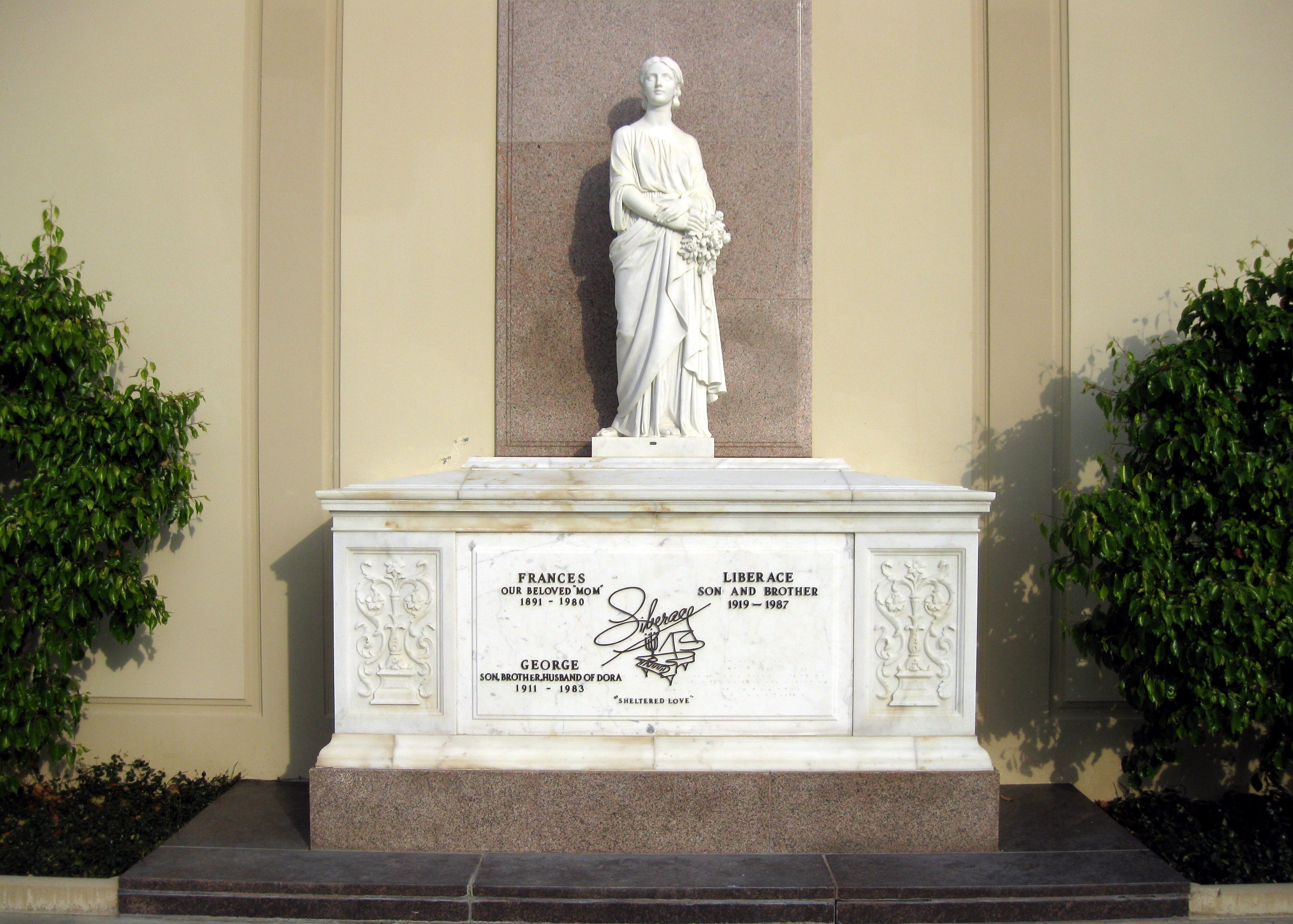
Liberace, with his brother George

- Jack LaLanne (1914–2011), fitness and nutrition expert
- Dorothy Lamour (1914–1996), actress and singer
- Muriel Landers (1921–1977), actress
- Christa Lang (1943-2026), actress and screenwriter
- Fritz Lang (1890–1976), director
- June Lang (1917–2005), actress
- Grace Lantz (1903–1992), voice-over artist, voice of Woody Woodpecker
- Walter Lantz (1899–1994), animator and founder of Walter Lantz Productions
- Eric Larson (1905–1988), animator
- Nicolette Larson (1952–1997), singer
- Philip H. Lathrop (1912–1995), cinematographer
- Wesley Lau (1921–1984), actor
- Charles Laughton (1899–1962), actor
- Stan Laurel (1890–1965), actor and comedian, one-half of the Laurel and Hardy duo
- William Lava (1911–1971), composer
- Yvette Lebon (1910–2014), actress
- Arthur Lee (1945–2006), singer, songwriter, musician
- Robert Edwin Lee (1918–1994), playwright and lyricist
- Lance LeGault (1935–2012), actor
- Earl Lestz (1938–2017), studio executive
- Stan Levey (1926–2005), musician
- Liberace (1919–1987), musician
- George Liberace (1911–1983), actor and musician
- Diane Linkletter (1948–1969), daughter of Art Linkletter
- Glenard P. Lipscomb (1915–1970), former US Congressman
- Felix Locher (1882–1969), actor
- Carey Loftin (1914–1997), actor and stuntman
- Hicks Lokey (1904–1990), animator
- Julie London (1926–2000), actress and singer
- Louise Lorraine (1904–1981), actress
- John Lounsbery (1911–1976), animator
- Otto Ludwig (1903–1983), editor
- Art Lund (1915–1990), actor and singer
- Jeffrey Lynn (1909–1995), actor

== M ==
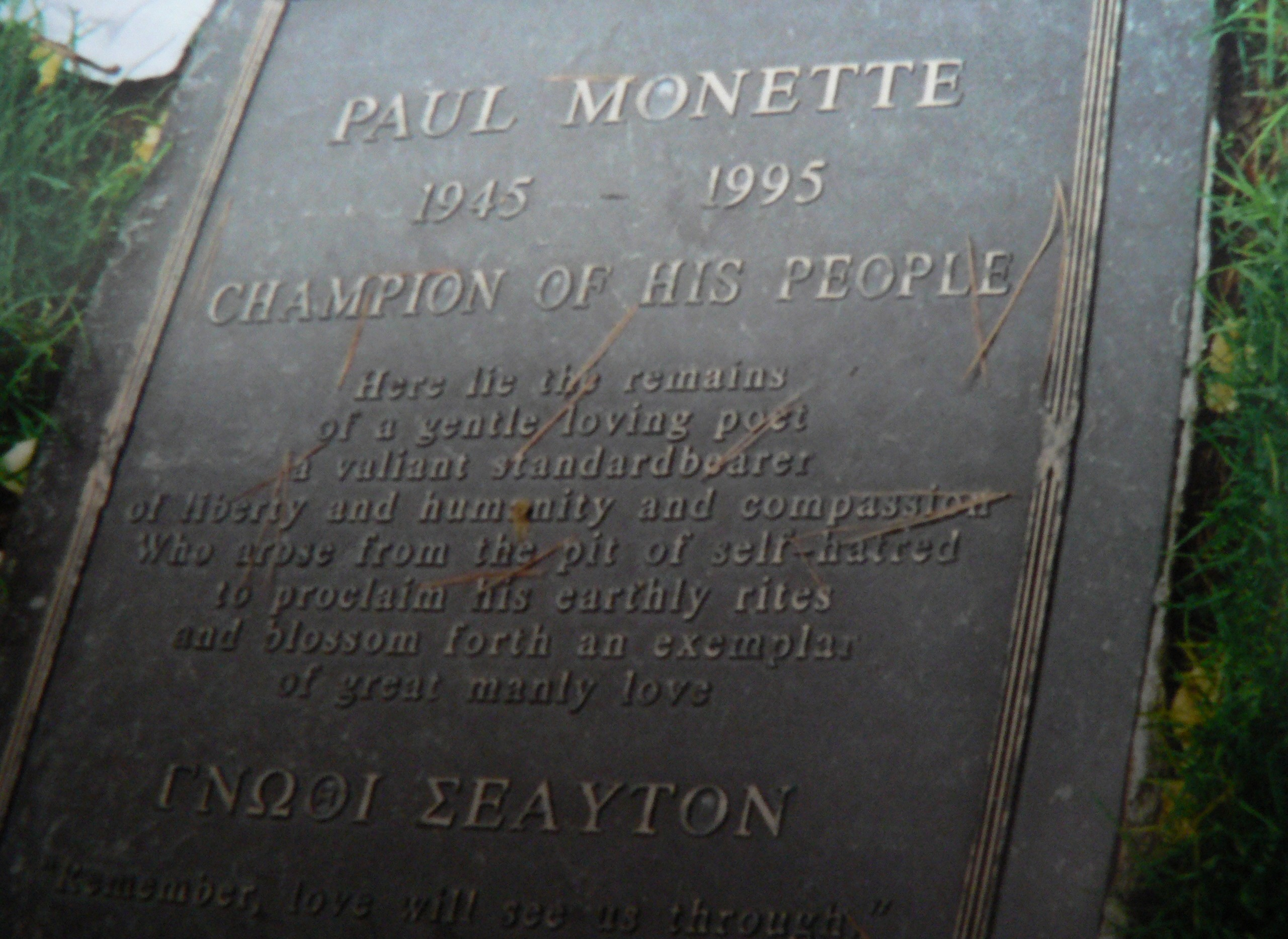
Paul Monette

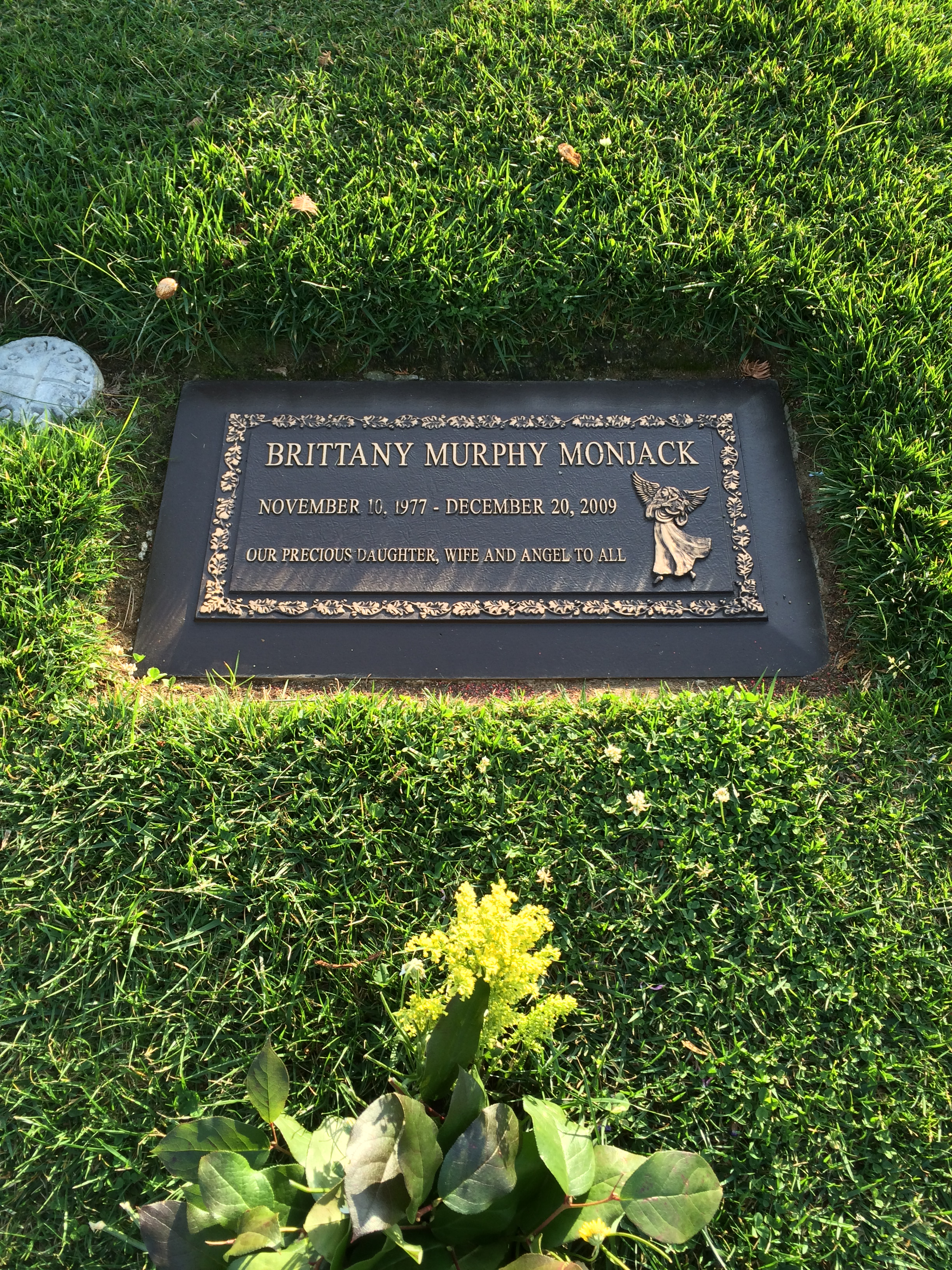
Brittany Murphy

- Kenneth MacDonald (1901–1972), actor
- Harriet E. MacGibbon (1905–1987), actress
- Chummy MacGregor (1903–1973), musician
- Wilbur Mack (1873–1964), actor
- Dave Mackay (1932–2020), jazz pianist
- Marjorie Main (1890–1975), actress
- Albert Hay Malotte (1895–1964), composer
- Shelly Manne (1920–1984), musician
- Jerry Maren (1920–2018), actor
- Richard Marquand (1937–1987), director
- Garry Marshall (1934–2016), writer, director, producer, and actor
- Jack Marshall (1921–1973), guitarist, composer and conductor
- Penny Marshall (1943–2018), actress and director
- Lock Martin (1916–1959), actor
- Strother Martin (1919–1980), actor
- Michelle Triola Marvin (1932–2009), actress
- Joseph Mascolo (1929–2016), actor
- Matty Matlock (1907–1978), musician
- Junius Matthews (1890–1978), actor
- Burny Mattinson (1935–2023), animator, director, producer
- Frank Mayo (1889–1963), actor
- Larry McCormick (1933–2004), television news anchor
- Pat McCormick (1927–2005), comedian
- Michelle McNamara (1970–2016), writer and crime blogger
- Caroline McWilliams (1945–2010), actress
- Jayne Meadows (1919–2015), actress
- Ralph Meeker (1920–1988), actor
- Martin Melcher (1915–1968), producer
- Sam Melville (1936–1989), actor
- Rafael Méndez (1906–1981), musician
- Chuck Menville (1940–1992), animator and writer
- Gertrude Messinger (1911–1995), actress
- Donald Mills (1915–1999), singer
- Harry Mills (1913–1982), singer
- Shirley Mills (1926–2010), actress
- Victor Milner (1893–1972), cinematographer
- Chris Mims (1970–2008), football player
- Cyril J. Mockridge (1896–1979), composer
- Louella Maxam Modie (1891–1970), silent film actress
- Paul Monette (1945–1995), author and poet
- Simon Monjack (1970–2010), producer, screenwriter
- Edmund Mortimer (1874–1944), actor
- Alvy Moore (1921–1997), actor
- Fred Moore (1911–1952), animator
- Vicki Morgan (1952–1983), model, socialite, and murder victim
- Alphonse Mouzon (1948–2016), drummer
- Brittany Murphy (1977–2009), actress, singer, voice artist
- Timothy Patrick Murphy (1959–1988), actor
- Burt Mustin (1884–1977), actor
- John Myhers (1921–1992), actor

== N ==
- Harriet Nelson (1909–1994), actress and singer
- Ozzie Nelson (1906–1975), actor and musician
- Ricky Nelson (1940–1985), actor and singer
- Bob Newhart (1929–2024), actor and comedian
- Michelle Nicastro (1960–2010), actress
- Red Nichols (1905–1965), musician
- Jack Nimitz (1930–2009), musician
- Lewis Nixon III (1918–1995), army officer, portrayed in Band of Brothers
- Heather North (1945–2017), actress
- Carroll Nye (1901–1974), actor

== O ==
- Donald O'Connor (1925–2003), actor, singer and dancer
- David Oliver (1962–1992), actor
- C. Timothy O'Meara (1943–2007), film editor
- Ron O'Neal (1937–2004), actor
- Henry Ong (1949–2018), playwright
- Orangey (1950–1967), animal actor (cat)
- William T. Orr (1917–2002), television producer and founder of Warner Bros. Television
- Orry-Kelly (1897–1964), costume designer
- Frank Orth (1880–1962), actor
- Bud Osborne (1884–1964), actor
- Chuck Osborne (1973–2012), football player

== P ==
- Joy Page (1924–2008), actress
- Nestor Paiva (1905–1966), actor
- Maria Palmer (1917–1981), actress
- Cecilia Parker (1914–1993), actress
- Eleanor Parker (1922–2013), actress
- Jean Parker (1915–2005), actress
- Hank Patterson (1888–1975), actor
- Don Paul (1925–2014), football player
- Bill Paxton (1955–2017), actor
- Kenneth Peach (1903–1988), cinematographer
- Bill Peet (1915–2002), animator
- Jack Pepper (1902–1979), actor
- Freddie Perren (1943–2004), musician
- Jack Perrin (1896–1967), actor
- Valerie Perrine (1943–2026), actress
- Barbara Perry (1921–2019), actress
- Matthew Perry (1969–2023), actor.
- Brock Peters (1927–2005), actor
- Rumen Petkov (1948–2018), animator
- George O. Petrie (1912–1997), actor
- Esther Phillips (1935–1984), singer
- Rich Piana (1971–2017), bodybuilder
- Charles Pierce (1926–1999), actor and female impersonator
- Daphne Pollard (1891–1978), actress
- Snub Pollard (1889–1962), actor and comedian
- Tony Pope (1947–2004), voice-over artist
- Jeff Porcaro (1954–1992), musician, drummer for Toto
- Mike Porcaro (1955–2015), bassist for Toto
- Jean Porter (1922–2018), actress
- John Clinton Porter (1871–1959), former mayor of Los Angeles
- Don Post (1902–1979), makeup artist
- Jerry Pournelle (1933–2017), author and journalist
- June Preston (1928–2022), child actress and opera singer
- Freddie Prinze (1954–1977), actor and comedian
- Alan Purwin (1961–2015), helicopter pilot

== R ==
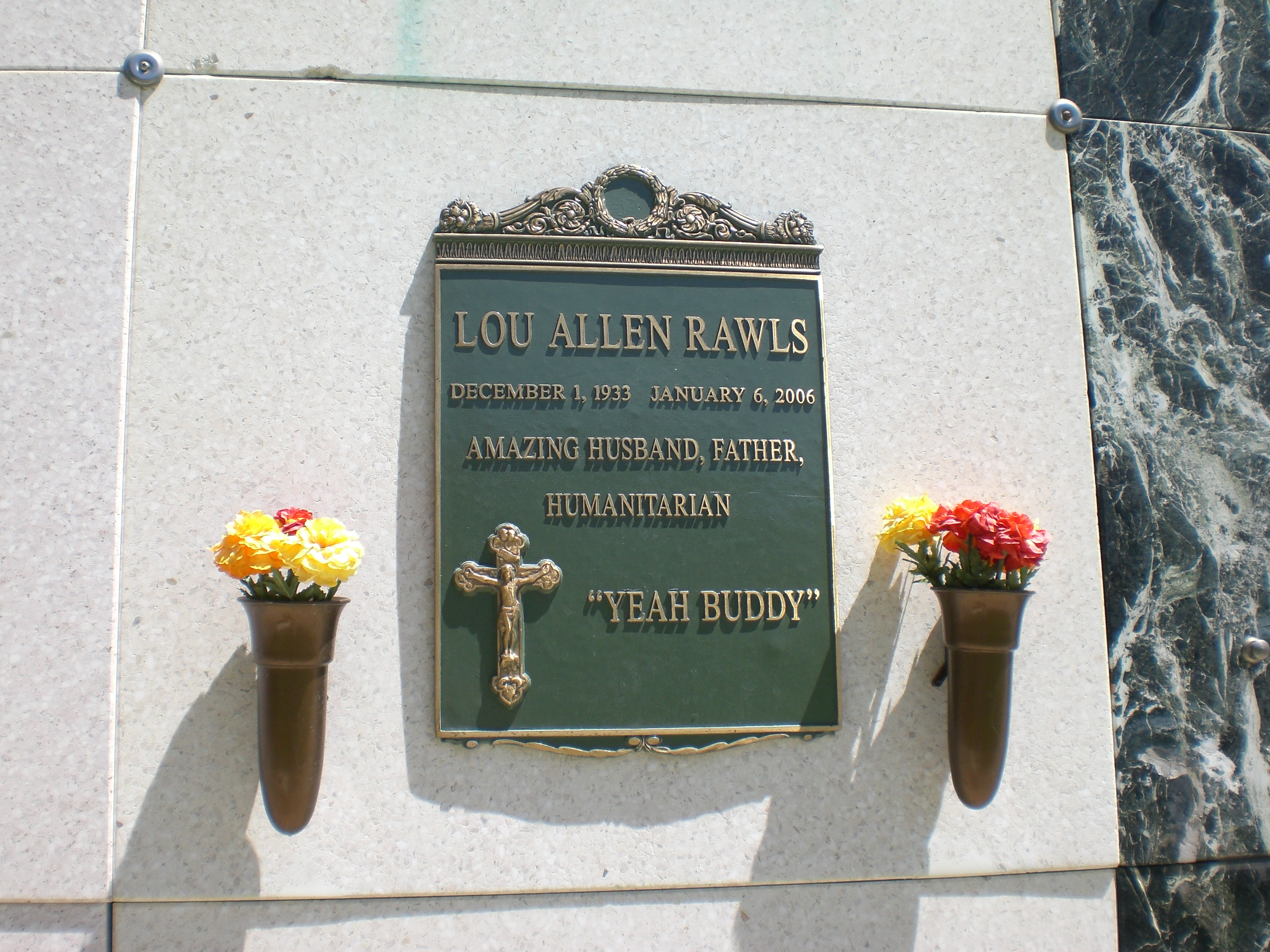
Lou Rawls's crypt

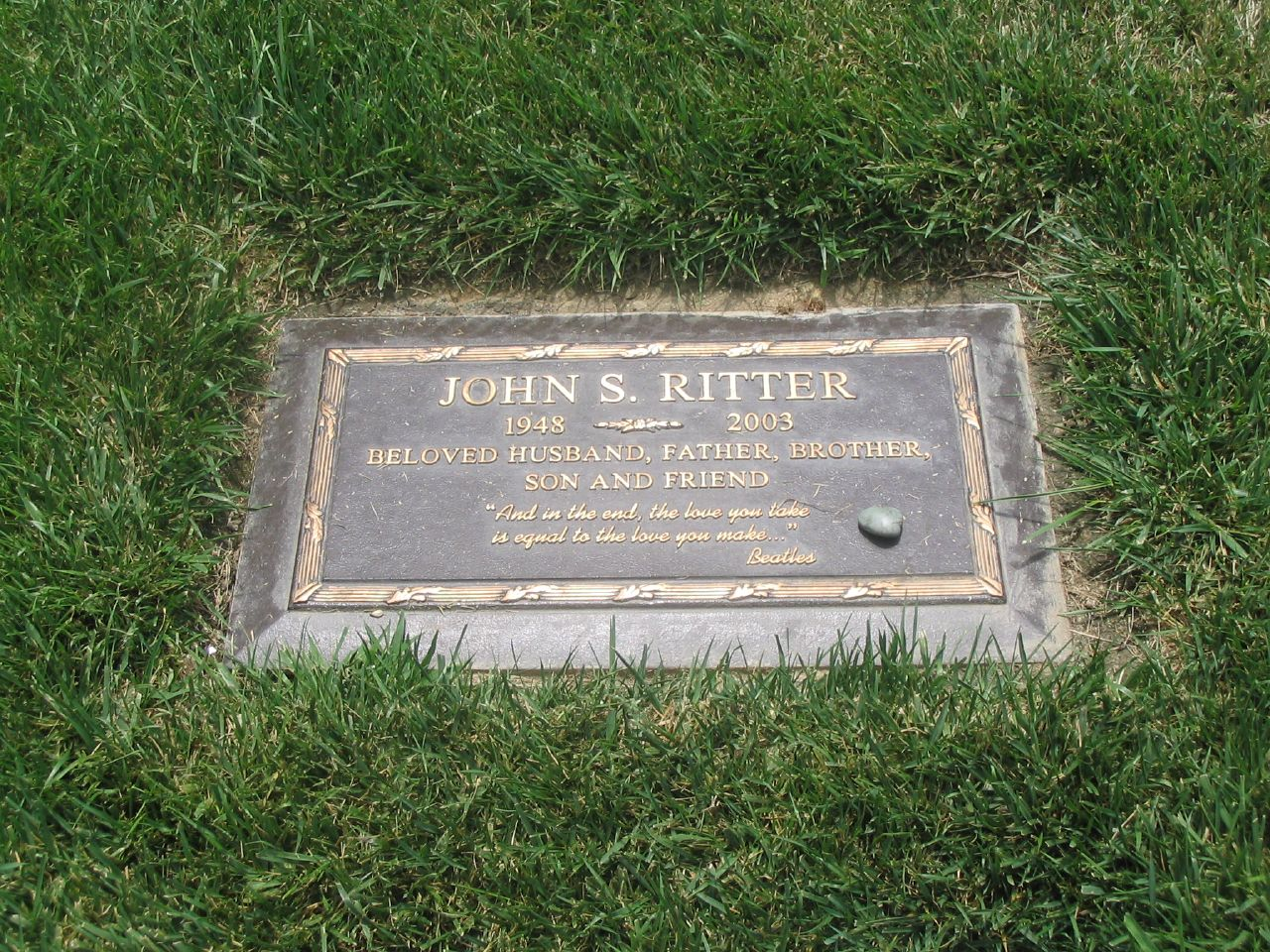
John Ritter's grave

- George Raft (1901–1980), actor
- Ramesh (Azar Mohebbi) (1950–2020), Persian musician
- Amanda Randolph (1896–1967), actress
- Lillian Randolph (1898–1980), actress
- Lou Rawls (1933–2006), singer
- Hugh Reilly (1915–1998), actor
- Bert Remsen (1925–1999), actor
- Ray Rennahan (1896–1980), cinematographer
- Dorothy Revier (1904–1993), actress
- Reynaldo Rey (1940–2015), actor, comedian, TV personality
- Debbie Reynolds (1932–2016), actress and singer
- Bill Richmond (1921–2016), television writer
- Dean Riesner (1918–2002), screenwriter
- John Ritter (1948–2003), actor, son of Tex Ritter and Dorothy Fay, husband of Amy Yasbeck, father of Jason Ritter and Tyler Ritter
- Preston Ritter (1949–2015), musician
- Naya Rivera (1987–2020), actress and singer
- Jason Robards Sr. (1892–1963), actor
- Gale Robbins (1921–1980), actress and singer
- Dar Robinson (1947–1986), film stuntman
- Jay Robinson (1930–2013), actor
- Kasey Rogers (1925–2006), actress
- John Roseboro (1933–2002), MLB player
- Joe E. Ross (1914–1982), actor and comedian
- Ruth Royce (1893–1971), actress
- Miklós Rózsa (1907–1995), composer
- Don Rudolph (1931–1968), MLB player
- Al Ruscio (1924–2013), actor

== S ==
- Sabu (1924–1963), actor
- Boris Sagal (1923–1981), television and film director
- Jack Sahakian (1931–1995), hairdresser and actor
- Ruth St. Denis (1879–1968), dancer and choreographer
- Raymond St. Jacques (1930–1990), actor
- Bill Salkeld (1917–1967), MLB player
- Isabel Sanford (1917–2004), actress
- George Savalas (1924–1985), actor
- Telly Savalas (1922–1994), actor
- Richard Schaal (1928–2014), actor
- Johnny Sekka (1934–2006), actor
- Leon Shamroy (1901–1974), cinematographer
- Reta Shaw (1912–1982), actress
- Larry Shay (1897–1988), songwriter
- Robert Shayne (1900–1992), actor
- Bobby Sherman (1943–2025), singer and actor
- Roberta Sherwood (1913–1999), singer (unmarked grave)
- Mickey Simpson (1913–1985), actor
- John Singleton (1968–2019), film director and screenwriter
- Tom Sizemore (1961–2023), actor
- Phillips Smalley (1865–1939), actor and director
- Keely Smith (1928–2017), singer
- Roger Smith (1932–2017), actor
- Jack Soo (1917–1979), actor
- Olan Soule (1909–1994), actor
- Tim Spencer (1908–1974), actor and singer
- Jack Starrett (1936–1989), actor and director
- Bob Steele (1907–1988), actor
- Joan Benedict Steiger (1927–2024), actress
- Rod Steiger (1925–2002), actor
- George Stevens (1904–1975), director
- McLean Stevenson (1927–1996), actor
- Jay Stewart (1918–1989), television and radio announcer
- Fred Stone (1873–1959), actor
- Bill Stout (1927–1989), journalist
- Glenn Strange (1899–1973), actor, musician, early rodeo star⁰
- Victor Sutherland (1889–1968), actor
- Harold Norling Swanson (1899–1991), Hollywood literary agent

== T ==
- William Talman (1915–1968), actor
- Vic Tayback (1930–1990), actor
- Rod Taylor (1930–2015), actor
- Zola Taylor (1938–2007), singer
- Jack Teagarden (1905–1964), musician
- Frankie Thomas (1921–2006), actor
- Alfred Tischbauer (1853–1922) artist
- Martha Tilton (1915–2006), singer
- Wayne Tippit (1932–2009), actor
- George Tomasini (1909–1964), editor
- Pinky Tomlin (1907–1987), actor and musician
- Leo Tover (1902–1964), cinematographer
- Bobby Troup (1918–1999), actor and musician
- Charles Trowbridge (1882–1967), actor
- Forrest Tucker (1919–1986), actor

== V ==
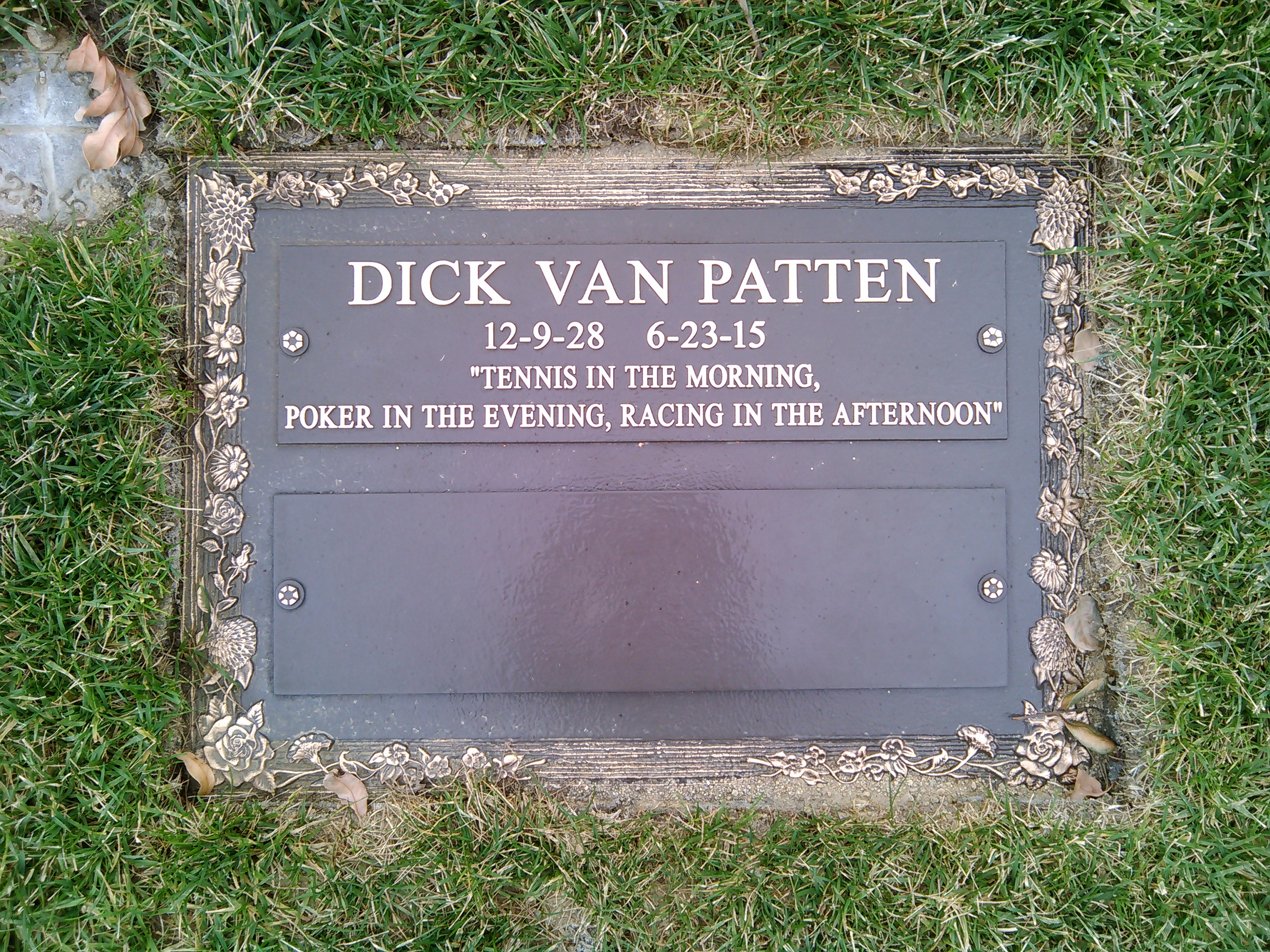
Dick Van Patten

- Virginia Vale (1920–2006), actress
- Fernando Valenzuela (1960–2024), baseball player
- Lee Van Cleef (1925–1989), actor
- Buddy Van Horn (1928–2021), director and stuntman
- Dick Van Patten (1928–2015), actor
- Wally Vernon (1905–1970), actor
- Katherine Victor (1923–2004), actress
- Al Viola (1919–2007), musician

== W ==
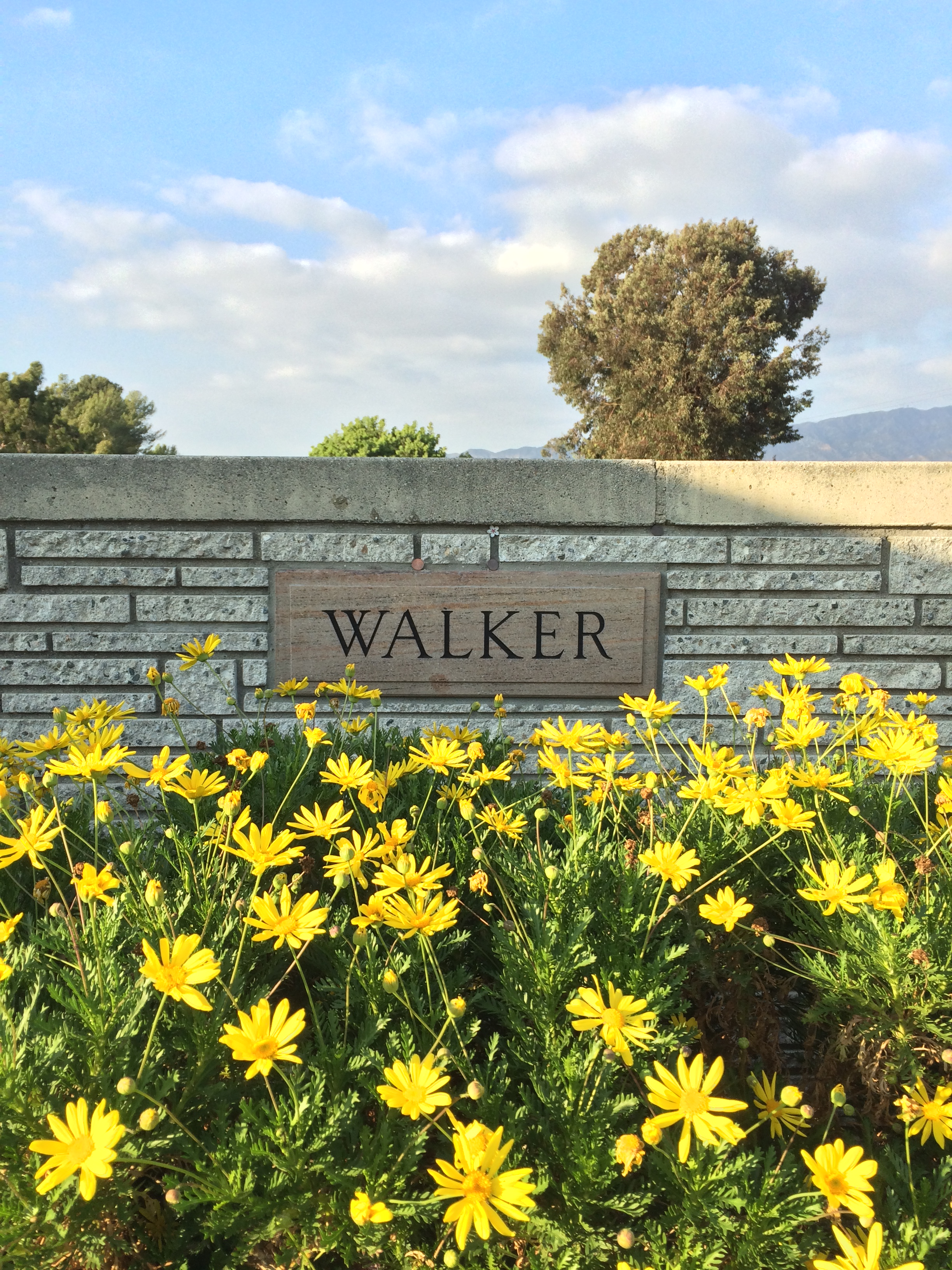
Paul Walker

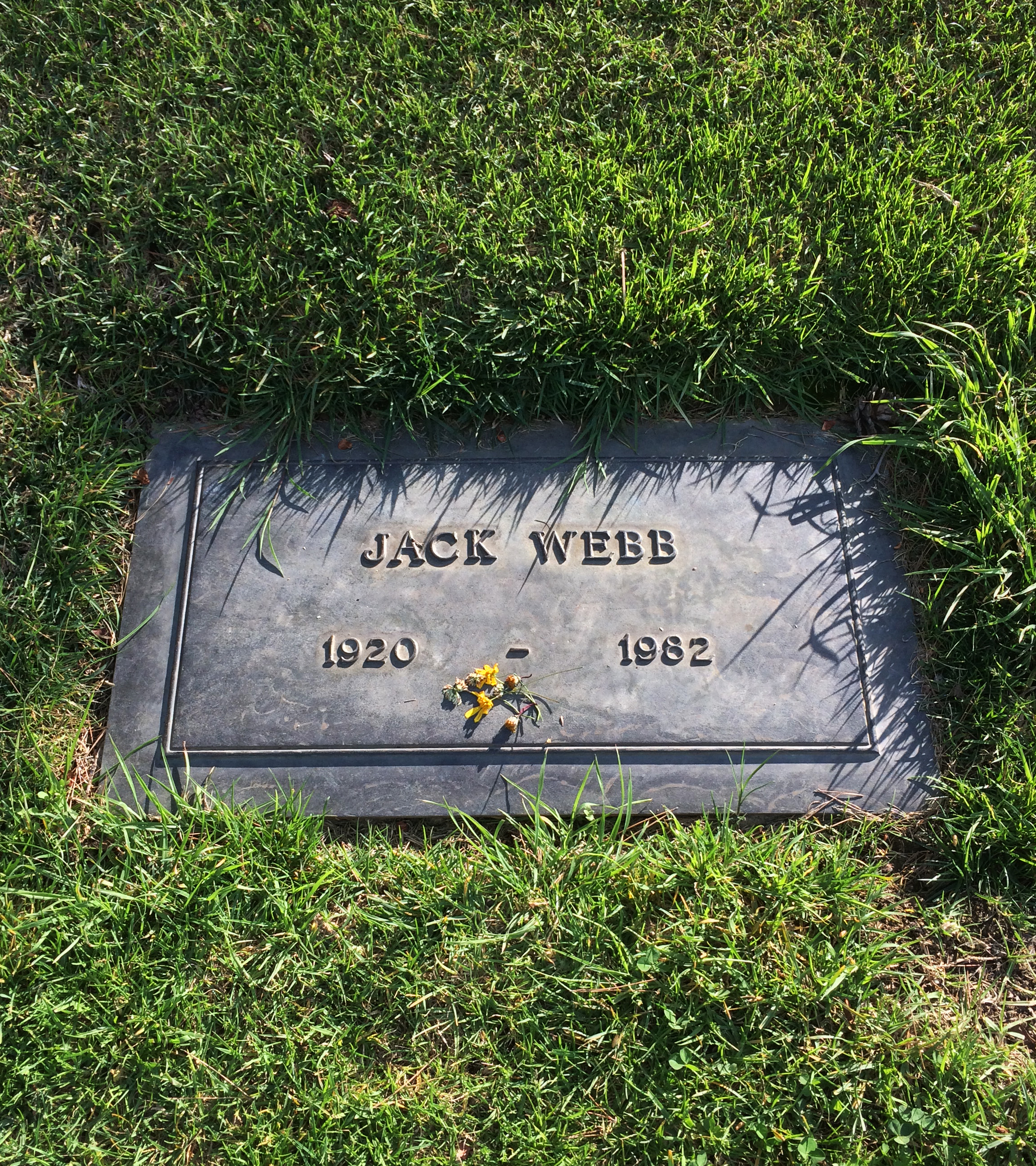
Jack Webb

- Jack Wagner (1925–1995), announcer at Disneyland, "The Voice of Disneyland"
- Jimmy Wakely (1914–1982), actor and singer
- Janet Waldo (1920–2016), voice actress
- Paul Walker (1973–2013), actor
- Eddy Waller (1889–1977), actor
- Larry Walters (1949–1993), truck driver known as "Lawnchair Larry" or "The Lawn Chair Pilot who flew a lawn chair with weather balloons"
- Kent Warner (1943–1984), costume designer
- Ruth Waterbury (1896–1982), film critic
- Michael Wayne (1934–2003), film producer and actor, son of John Wayne
- Paul Weatherwax (1900–1960), editor
- Jack Webb (1920–1982), actor, producer, and director
- Reinhold Weege (1949–2012), television writer
- Frank Wells (1932–1994), Disney president
- Billy West (1892–1975), actor and comedian
- Keith A. Wester (1940–2002), sound engineer
- Norman Whitfield (1940–2008), songwriter and composer
- Claire Whitney (1890–1969), actress
- Richard Whorf (1906–1966), actor, director, and producer
- Crane Wilbur (1886–1973), actor and director
- Fred Willard (1933–2020), actor and comedian
- Jess Willard (1881–1968), world heavyweight boxing champion
- Bill Williams (1915–1992), actor
- Cindy Williams (1947–2023), actress and producer
- Dick Williams (1926–2018), singer
- Guinn "Big Boy" Williams (1899–1962), actor
- Rhys Williams (1897–1969), actor
- Roy Williams (1907–1976), animator, The Mickey Mouse Club Mouseketeer
- Vesta Williams (1957–2011), singer
- Dick Wilson (1916–2007), actor
- Marie Wilson (1916–1972), actress and comedian
- Scott Wilson (1942–2018), actor
- Paul Winfield (1941–2004), actor
- Charles Winninger (1884–1969), stage and film actor
- Bill Withers (1938–2020), singer
- John Witherspoon (1942–2019), actor and comedian
- Ad Wolgast (1888–1955), boxer
- David L. Wolper (1928–2010), producer
- Tyrus Wong (1910–2016), animator
- John Wooden (1910–2010), UCLA Bruins men's basketball coach

== Y ==
- Ralph Yearsley (1896–1928), actor
- Vasyl Yemetz (1891–1982), bandurist, composer, founder of the Ukrainian Bandurist Chorus
- Snooky Young (1919–2011), musician

== Z ==
- Paul Zastupnevich (1921–1997), costume designer
- Arnold Ziffel (1964–1972), known as "Arnold the Pig" on Green Acres (urn is buried with trainer, Frank Inn)
- George Zucco (1886–1960), actor
