= Datla =

Datla is a Telugu surname. Notable people bearing the name include:

- Datla Satyanarayana Raju (1904–1973), personal doctor to Netaji Subhash Chandra Bose
- Datla Balarama Raju (1907–1998), Indian politician, Member of Parliament for Narasapuram from 1962 to 1971
- Datla Venkata Suryanarayana Raju (1928–2010), Indian film producer and chairman of the National Film Development Corporation
- Ramesh Datla, Indian industrialist (born 1961), chairman and managing director of Elico Limited
- Datla Venkata Krishnam Raj, founder of Biological E. Limited
- Mahima Datla, managing director of Biological E. Limited
