= Ramesh =

Ramesh is a male given name among Indians and Nepalese. It is a contraction of a Sanskrit epithet of Vishnu, Ramesha (Rameśa), which is a conjugation of Ramā, another name of Lakshmi, and Īśa, which means power or lord. It translates to, "lord of Lakshmi". It is used among Hindus, Jains and Buddhists and some Christians.

Notable people with the name include:

- Jairam Ramesh (born 1954), Indian politician
- Jithan Ramesh (born 1981), Tamil cinema actor
- Ramachandran Ramesh (born 1976), Indian chess grandmaster
- Sadagoppan Ramesh (born 1975), Indian cricketer and film actor
- Viswashkumar Ramesh (born 1984), Indo-British sole survivor of Air India Flight 171 crash.
- Ramesh (1946–2020), Iranian singer
- Ramesh Aravind (born 1964), Kannada movie actor
- Ramesh Bhat, Kannada movie actor
- Ramesh Chennithala, (born 1956), Kerala politician
- Ramesh Datla, Indian industrialist
- Ramesh Karad (born 1968), Indian politician from Maharashtra
- Ramesh Krishnan (born 1961), Indian tennis player
- Pasupuleti Ramesh Naidu (1933–1987), Telugu film music director
- Ramesh Ponnuru (born 1974), American political commentator
- Asogan Ramesh Ramachandren (c. 1973–1998), Singaporean convicted murderer
- Ramesh Rushantha (born 1983), Sri Lankan travel vlogger, water sports instructor and deckhand
- Ramesh Sippy (born 1947), Indian film producer
- Sachin Ramesh Tendulkar, Indian cricketer

== Fictional characters ==
- Professor Ramesh, fictional astronomer in Kim Possible
- Ramesh Majhu fictional shopkeeper in Fags, Mags and Bags
