= Tantrum (Sri Lankan band) =

TANTRUM
- Origin: Sri Lanka
- Genres: Thrash metal; Death metal; Progressive metal; Hard rock
- Years active: 2002 – 2016
- Members: Javeen Soysa; Akila Peiris; Thishan Wijesinghe; Ranil Senarath

Tantrum was a heavy metal band based in Colombo, Sri Lanka, originally formed in 2002. The band was one of the early pioneers among the first wave of "new millennium" heavy metal bands in Sri Lanka when the genre saw a rise in popularity in the country after the year 2000.

== Biography ==
School mates Hasula Dias and Javeen Soysa formed Tantrum in 2002 as a heavy metal band when they were students at S. Thomas' College, Mount Lavinia. At the time they barely knew the rudiments of instrumentation, and actually getting a band off the ground seemed unrealistic. Eventually, Hasula learned how to play a box guitar, later moving on to an electric guitar. In the meantime, schoolmate Dasith Fernando got a drum set and soon they were jamming, with Javeen on vocals. Another schoolmate, Soorya Hasthimuni, joined the band, and the four of them started to cover songs by their favourite bands. Soorya was on lead guitar and Hasula on rhythm guitar. Since they were lacking a bassist, they got another friend to help them on the bass guitar.

At the beginning of 2004 the band decided take things more seriously and chose the name "Tantrum". They started off practising in cheap studios, since access to cash and good equipment was hard to come-by. The band put together a demo for TNL Onstage, although they were still short of a consistent bassist. Javeen took up bass guitar duties, but found it hard to play and sing at the same time. The band then got a new vocalist, who was also a schoolmate, who agreed to fill in until the band could identify a permanent vox. In the end, the band did not make it in to TNL Onstage 2004 due to the poor quality of the recording submitted as a demo as the band could not afford to record the track in a professional studio.

This disappointing incident motivated the members to improve. Soon after, drummer Dasith left the band and other schoolmates filled in on various instruments for a short period, with Sujiv Fonseka and James Mather staying on as permanent drummer and lead guitarist respectively at the end of 2004. With these talented new members admitted to the Tantrum line-up, in the first few months of 2005 Tantrum had a stable line-up and decided to work on developing the original songs the band had composed over the past year. For once, they did not have to depend on many outside practice studio facilities as they practised at the drummer's home.

Tantrum recorded and released their first single titled "The Destroyer", which instantly made waves in the local music scene with its unique theme, creative riffs and catchy drumming. It reached the number one spot on local TNL Radio's SL Hot 10, which it held for several weeks, and was the first debut track of any local band to reach the Number 1 spot on this much listened to chart-show that highlighted the best of local talent each week.

This earned Tantrum some recognition in the music scene. They joined the now defunct Rock Company, which was then the main organisation promoting rock and metal bands in Sri Lanka. Soon afterwards, Tantrum released their second single, titled "Alone," which although wholly different from The Destroyer in terms of mood and composition, also became a chart topping hit within a few weeks of its debut, and a new favourite among the local rock fans. Tantrum entered TNL Onstage 2005, and won the trophy for the Best Band. This was a good achievement as the band had been unable to even qualify for the competition the previous year. After Onstage and the release of the track "Alone," drummer Sujiv left the band as he was leaving the country. He was replaced by former Hi-Octane drummer Heshan Jayawardena. Soon after Tantrum's first Rock Saturday event, which was also in 2005, Hasula left the band as he was leaving the country. The band that had a unique presence with three guitarists was now down to two, and has remained a four-member line-up ever since.

The band also later saw the exit of guitarists Soorya and James who both left the country and were replaced by Malinda Senanayake and Arjun Dhas. Malinda later left the band and was replaced by Thishan Wijesinghe, while Arjun was replaced by Akila Peiris. Drummer Heshan Jayawardena left the band in 2006, and was replaced by Oshada Wijemanne who played with the band until 2008, when he left the country and was replaced by Tharaka Seneviratne, formerly of Whirlwind and Stigmata.

The band released an EP titled The Destruction Begins in 2006. They have performed at several large and small musical events across Sri Lanka, having also headlined Heavy Metal festivals in India and the Maldives, with some members having played in Australia with associated acts.

Tantrum released their debut album "Rebellion" in 2012, setting a new standard in the quality of heavy metal recordings in Sri Lanka.

On February 14, 2015, Tantrum released a statement announcing that Taraka Senewirathne would step down from drumming duties. He was replaced by Ranil "Jackson" Senarath. On September 28, 2015 Tantrum released a brand new song titled "Milieu". The song was part of a compilation put together by TNL Radio for the station's 15th anniversary.

Tantrum vanished without explanation shortly after the release of "Milieu," thus ending an era with one of the last of the original new millennium heavy metal bands in Sri Lanka being destroyed by the very mainstream music it set out to challenge.

== Discography ==
=== Studio releases ===
- 2012: Rebellion

=== EPs ===
- 2006:The Destruction Begins

== Band members ==
=== Last known lineup ===
- Javeen Soysa – vocals/bass (formerly bass player, Stigmata)
- Akila Peiris – guitar
- Thishan Wijesinghe – guitar
- Ranil "Jackson" Senarath - drums

=== Former members ===
Guitars:

- Hasula Dias
- Soorya Hasthimuni
- James Mather
- Arjun Dhas
- Malinda Senanayake

Drums:

- Dasith Fernando
- Sujiv Fonseka
- Heshan Jayawardena
- Oshada Wijemanne
- Taraka Senewiratne
