= Ramesh Rushantha =

Sri Lankan travel vlogger, water sports instructor, senior deckhand (born 1983)

Ramesh Rushantha Silva
- රමේශ් රුශාන්ත සිල්වා
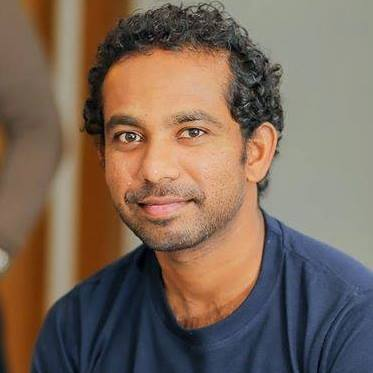
- Born: Ramesh Rushantha Silva; 30 March 1983 (age 43); Narahenpita, Sri Lanka
- Education: Isipathana College
- Alma mater: Colombo International Nautical and Engineering College
- Occupations: Travel vlogger; water sports instructor; senior deckhand
- Children: --
- Musical career
- Genres: Rock; soul; rhythm and blues
- Instrument: Percussion
- Years active: 1999–2003 / 2009–present
- Member of: The Kreators
- Website: rameshsilva.com

Ramesh Rushantha Silva (Sinhala:රමේශ් රුශාන්ත සිල්වා: born 30 March 1983), commonly as Ramesh Rushantha, is a Sri Lankan travel vlogger, water sports instructor and senior / lead deckhand He is also the CEO of Isipathana College Online Information Center and currently runs his own travel program Walk With RAMA on YouTube.

== Early life ==
He was born on 30 March 1983 in Narahenpita as the eldest of the family. He completed education from Isipathana College. He excelled cricket and rugby during school times, where he was a member of the college under 13, 15, and 16 cricket team as well as under 13, 15, 17, XV rugby teams. Silva is also a member of Sinhala literacy society and was the vice president in 2002. Then he worked in several school societies such as media, computer, and in oriental band. He completed A/L in 2002.

He is a graduate of Colombo International Nautical and Engineering College. He is also the CEO of Isipathana College Online Information Center and currently runs his own travel program Walk With RAMA in YouTube.

== Career ==
At the age of 16, Silva worked as a door to door book seller. After completing A/L in 2002 , he joined with one of refrigerator making company in Ratmalana for a cheap salary. Then he worked as a potter in Tangerine Beach hotel, Kalutara.

In 1999, he formed a rock band called "The Kreators" along with his friends Roshan and Dinesh where Silva as the percussionist. The Kreators is an instrumental band who composed jam sessions with few rock bands. The Kreators won several competitions organized by other schools which includes School Interact Clubs, such as Collide-scope, Talent Search.

In 2000, they released the popular song Sri Lankan Mix which featured in the Boney M's Rasputin Sri Lankan mix. The song is still the best known song of The Kreators. The song was released when Boney M. arrived in Sri Lanka. Later, two more have joined to the group, Harsha on guitar, violin, accordion, banjo and Chamika on keyboards. Each member plays more than one musical instrument, which made ‘The Kreators’ the first instrumental band to play many instruments with a few members in the band. In 2001, first manager Dinesh Soyza joined with the band to manage non-musical activities. In 2001, three more joined the band – Kasun on thabla, Maria on bongos and Sajith on vocal backups. In 2002 Kreators backed up a stage play Animal Farm Directed by Feroz Kamardeen. Later, the band was invited to feature popular rock band "Jacobs Ladder" where Kreators participated in the TNL Onstage competition and became finalists. Meanwhile, Kreators became the first ethnic fusion rock band in Sri Lanka. The band split up in 2003 due to some members new careers. In 25 April 2003, they held the debut concert 'Sri Lankan in Concert' at BMICH.

Then he left Sri Lanka in 2005 for merchant navy. After few years, he joined as a deck rating in commercial vessel. Apart from music, Silva worked as a Deck hand, Deck Instructor, Bosun, senior deckhand on a private yachts based in Europe since 2008. Currently he is a full time deckhand on a private yacht in a French company which includes all watersports and other works on the yacht. In 2009, he returned to Sri Lanka and joined back with The Kreators. In 2010, Kreators released their first album ‘Kreators Reborn 2010’. The album was created with Ravihans and Hans Rock team under guidance from Ravibandu Vidyapathi and his son Jith Vidyapathi.

== Ramesh's Yachting Career ==
Ramesh began his yachting career in 2008 as a deck hand on the Private and Charter yacht MY Amevi. Over the next 15 years, he gained valuable experience and rose through the ranks, eventually being promoted to senior deck Instructor in 2020.

After leaving MY Amevi, Ramesh joined the expedition yacht MY Brother Brancusi as a deck hand in 2024. During his time on Brancusi, he was promoted to bosun while on probationary period. Ramesh joined a 96-meter private and charter yacht in 2025.

Silva has been part of discussions to grant the custodianship of Henry Pedris Ground to Isipathana College as their rugby ground.

He runs the YouTube channel RAMA, where he publishes a vlog about travel and water sports. Recently he expressed his ideas and negative impact on motor racing held in Hambantota.

In 2022, Silva collaborated with entrepreneur, marketer and trainer Roshan Yaheya to establish the company Universal Green Solutions. The company is in the process of developing a waste converting machine to be deployed in Sri Lanka where the prototype machine will be launched in 2022 fourth quarter as the pre-phase-1 of the project.
