= Photoplay =

American film magazine

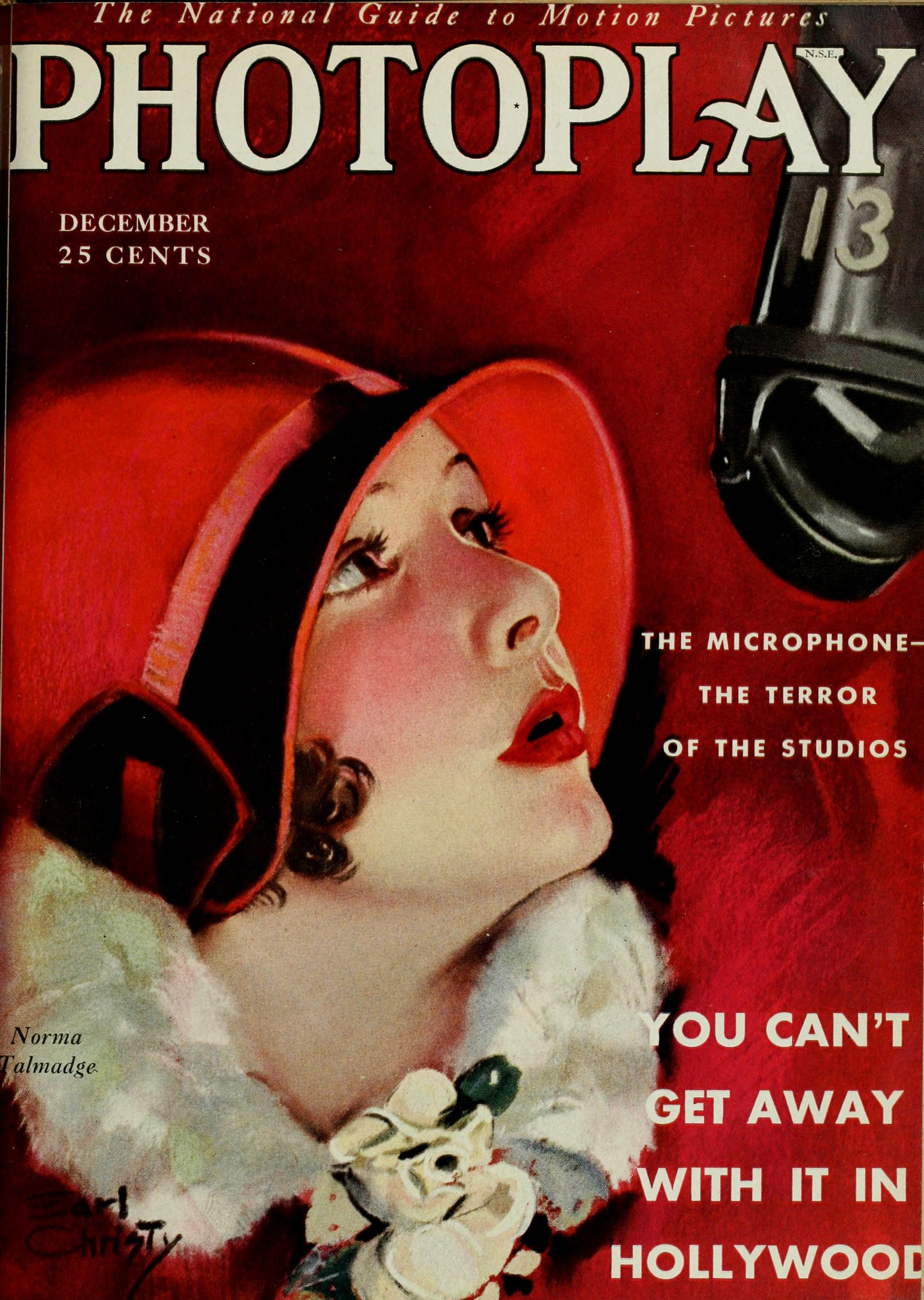
- "The Microphone—The Terror of the Studios" (December 1929 issue); the cover features an Earl Christy portrait of actress Norma Talmadge
- Categories: Film; Entertainment
- Publisher: Photoplay Publishing Company
- Founded: 1911; 115 years ago
- Final issue: 1980; 46 years ago
- Company: Macfadden Publications
- Country: United States
- Based in: Chicago, Illinois
- Language: English
- ISSN: 0732-538X

Photoplay was one of the first American film fan magazines. It was founded in Chicago in 1911. Under early editors Julian Johnson and James R. Quirk, it became a pacesetter for fan magazines in style and reach. In 1921, Photoplay established what is considered the first significant annual movie award. For most of its run, it was published by Macfadden Publications. The magazine ceased publication in 1980.

== History ==
Photoplay began as a short fiction magazine concerned mostly with the plots and characters of films at the time and was used as a promotional tool for those films. In 1915, Julian Johnson and James R. Quirk became the editors (though Quirk had been vice president of the magazine since its inception), and together they created a format which would set a precedent for almost all celebrity magazines that followed. By 1918 the circulation exceeded 200,000, with the popularity of the magazine fueled by the public's increasing interest in the private lives of celebrities.

== Popularity ==
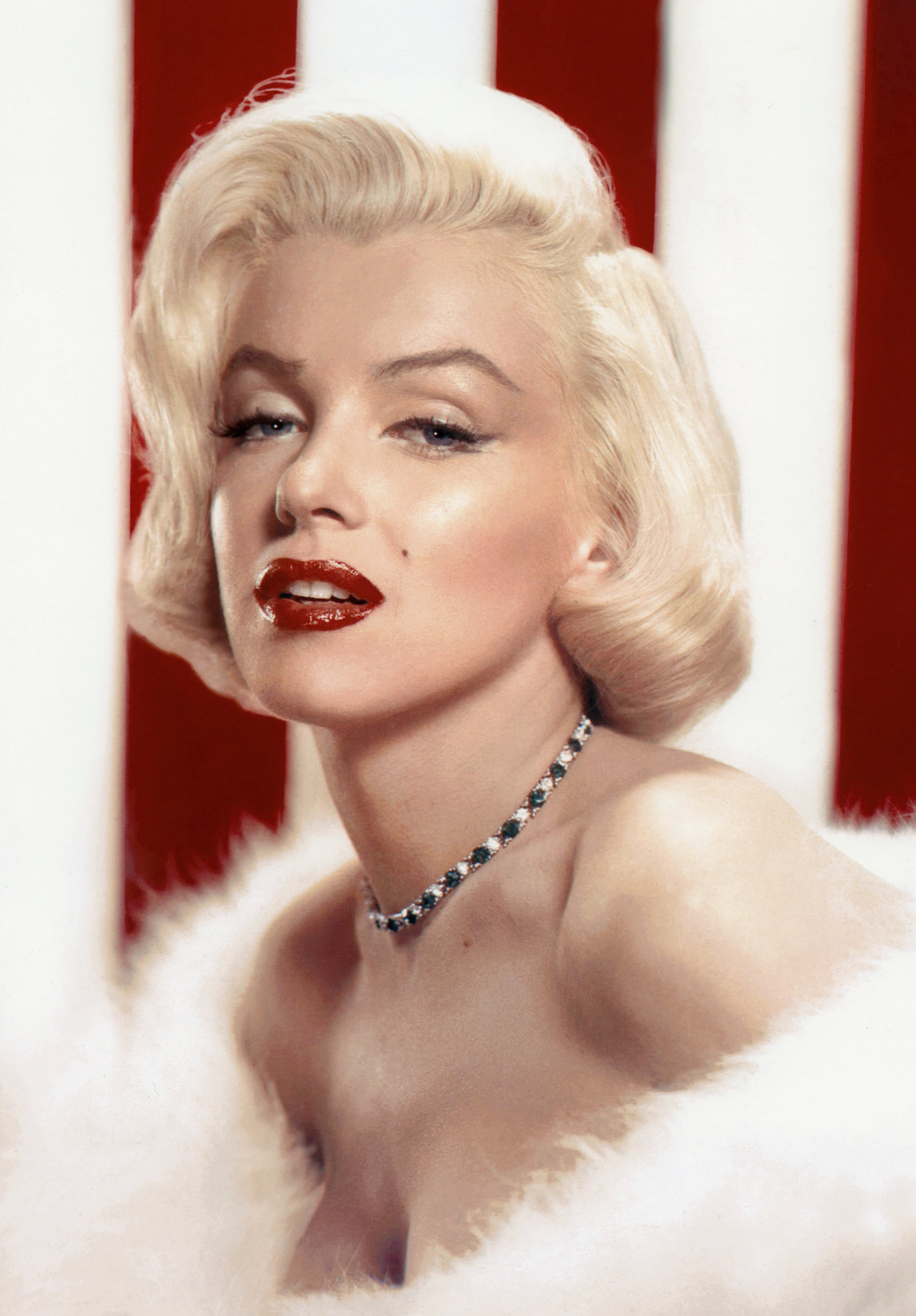
Marilyn Monroe in the December 1953 issue of Photoplay magazine

Photoplay reached its apex in the 1920s and 1930s, and was considered quite influential within the motion picture industry. The magazine was renowned for its artwork portraits of film stars, by such artists as Earl Christy and Charles Sheldon, on the cover. Macfadden Publications purchased the magazine in 1934. With the advance of color photography, by 1937 the magazine instead began using photographs of the stars.

Photoplay published the writings of Lillian Day, Sheilah Graham, Hedda Hopper, Dorothy Kilgallen, Hazel MacDonald, Louella Parsons, Adela Rogers St. Johns, Rob Wagner (later the editor and publisher of Script), and Walter Winchell, among others. The magazine was edited by Quirk until 1932; later editors include Kathryn Dougherty, Ruth Waterbury, and Adele Whitely Fletcher. It also featured the health and beauty advice of Sylvia of Hollywood, arguably the first fitness guru to the stars.

Sidney Skolsky, a nationally syndicated gossip columnist for the New York Daily News and later the New York Daily Mirror, had a regular column in Photoplay called "From A Stool At Schwab's", the Hollywood drugstore he made famous; such was the magazine's popularity.

== The Photoplay Magazine Medal of Honor ==
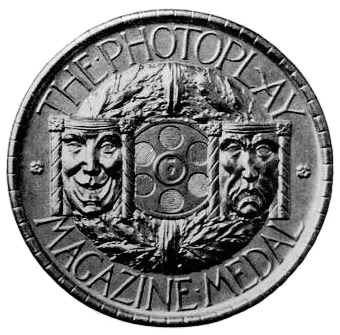
Front of the first Photoplay Magazine Medal of Honor, created in gold by Tiffany & Co. and presented in 1921 to Cosmopolitan Productions for the film Humoresque (1920)

In 1921, Photoplay established what is considered the first significant annual movie award, the Photoplay Magazine Medal of Honor. An actual medallion produced by Tiffany & Co., it was voted on by the readers of the magazine and given to the producer of the year's best film, chosen with an emphasis on (according to Quirk) "the ideals and motives governing its production... the worth of its dramatic message." Though Photoplay only gave the single award for best film, its intentions and standards were influential on the Academy Awards founded later in the decade, and they overlap on Best Picture choices to some extent, though increasingly in the 1930s Photoplay's choices reflected its primarily female readership. By 1939, the Medal of Honor had declined in importance, and the award was discontinued that year.

From 1944 to 1968, Photoplay awarded a Gold Medal for film of the year based on polling done by George Gallup's Audience Research Inc. through the 1950s, and then voted on by the magazine's readers. It also awarded Most Popular Male Star and Most Popular Female Star based on actors' and actresses' popularity, not a particular performance. The awards were based on polling through the 1950s, and then on a vote by the readers, similar to the Gold Medal. Bing Crosby and Greer Garson were frequently named the most popular film stars during the 1940s and later winners of the title included James Stewart, Jane Wyman, Alan Ladd, Marilyn Monroe, Rock Hudson, and Kim Novak. Most popular television stars were also named in the 1960s. In 1948, the Photoplay Awards were broadcast on network television as part of The Steve Allen Plymouth Show.

=== Medal of Honor winners: 1920–1939 ===
- 1920: Humoresque
- 1921: Tol'able David
- 1922: Robin Hood
- 1923: The Covered Wagon
- 1924: The Dramatic Life of Abraham Lincoln
- 1925: The Big Parade
- 1926: Beau Geste
- 1927: Seventh Heaven
- 1928: Four Sons
- 1929: Disraeli
- 1930: All Quiet on the Western Front
- 1931: Cimarron
- 1932: Smilin' Through
- 1933: Little Women
- 1934: The Barretts of Wimpole Street
- 1935: Naughty Marietta
- 1936: San Francisco
- 1937: Captains Courageous
- 1938: Sweethearts
- 1939: Gone with the Wind

=== Gold Medal Winners for film of the year: 1944–1968 ===
- 1944: Going My Way
- 1945: The Valley of Decision
- 1946: The Bells of St. Mary's
- 1947: The Jolson Story
- 1948: Sitting Pretty
- 1949: The Stratton Story
- 1950: Battleground
- 1951: Show Boat
- 1952: With a Song in My Heart
- 1953: From Here to Eternity
- 1954: Magnificent Obsession
- 1955: Love is a Many-Splendored Thing
- 1956: Giant
- 1957: An Affair to Remember
- 1958: Gigi
- 1959: Pillow Talk
- 1960: no awards
- 1961: Splendor in the Grass
- 1962: The Miracle Worker
- 1963: How the West Was Won
- 1964: The Unsinkable Molly Brown
- 1965: The Sound of Music
- 1966: The Russians Are Coming, the Russians Are Coming
- 1967: The Dirty Dozen
- 1968: Rosemary's Baby

Additionally, in September 1921, Photoplay began designating a handful of movies each month as the Best Pictures of the Month, providing a window into contemporary opinion at a time when movie coverage was not as extensive as it later became. The initial set of selections in the September 1921 issue were:

- The Conquering Power
- The Old Nest
- The Affairs of Anatol
- Experience
- Doubling for Romeo
- The Golem

In January 1923, Photoplay also added the category Best Performances of the Month. The initial selections for this award were:

Actor	Film
Mary Pickford	Tess of the Storm Country
Wallace Beery	Robin Hood
Betty Compson	To Have and To Hold
George Nichols	The Flirt
Helen Jerome Eddy	The Flirt
Jackie Coogan	Oliver Twist

== Mergers and closure ==
Photoplay merged with another fan magazine, Movie Mirror, in 1941; and with TV-Radio Mirror in 1977, when the name became Photoplay and TV Mirror.

The magazine published its final issue on April 15, 1980. In a sign of changing times, the cover photo featured not movie stars but two television actresses, Victoria Principal and Charlene Tilton. The skeleton staff of six people were all transferred to Us magazine, which Macfadden Publications had recently acquired. The president of Macfadden, Peter J. Callahan, said the decision to cease publication was made "very reluctantly", but also added the bald observation that "the day of the traditional movie magazine is over".

A British version of Photoplay debuted in March 1950, and in April 1981 it was rebranded as Photoplay: Movies and Video. It featured an equal mix of American and British films and stars, and ceased publication in 1989.

== See also ==
- Screenland
- Silver Screen
