= TNL Onstage =

Annual music competition

- Genre: Music Competition
- Begins: May
- Ends: September
- Frequency: Annually
- Location: Sri Lanka
- Years active: 17
- Inaugurated: 1999
- Most recent: ongoing
- Website: www.tnlonstage.com

TNL Onstage is an annual music talent competition based in Colombo, Sri Lanka, organised by the TNL Radio Network. It is currently in its seventeenth season. The competition takes place over a four-month period, during which the participants (musicians and artists from all musical genres) undergo a training programme inclusive of workshops, training sessions and one-on-one work with established musicians.

TNL Onstage commenced in 1999. The inaugural winners of the competition was rock 'n' roll band, Independent Square.

In 2013 the competition won the 'Most Fashionable Contest' award at the Fashion Asia Awards held in China., a category assessing events from Malaysia, Taiwan, Cambodia, Thailand and China.

The 2014 finale of TNL Onstage took place on 13 September 2014 at the Viharamahadevi Amphitheater, with the winner of the soloist category, Nikhil, Constellation winning the best band category and DJ Hiranya winning the spin off category.

== The Competition ==
Each year, musicians from around Sri Lanka submit recorded demos to TNL Radio Network. Station staff listen to the demos and make their first selections. Those chosen are called and given the opportunity to compete in the first round of Onstage. Judges evaluate musicians during each round on the basis of musicality. At the end of Onstage, one winner is selected for each of the following categories: Best Band, Best Soloist, and Best Musician. The winners are awarded cash prizes.

== Past winners ==
Independent Square won the title for Best Band at the first TNL Onstage competition in 1999.

Soul Skinner won the title of Best Band at TNL Onstage 2004. The band subsequently released their debut EP titled 'River Flow' to a highly receptive audience, resulting in a sold out release. Their debut album 'Gateway to Eternity' was released in 2005 and featured original tracks including Illusions, War at mind, Angel Dust, Chaotic Symphony and the title track Gateway to Eternity.

Tantrum the Colombo-based heavy metal band, won Best Band at TNL Onstage 2005. In 2006, they released their first EP, The Destruction Begins.

Magic Box Mixup got their start in 2005, and went on to win the People's Choice Award at TNL Onstage in 2006. The band is currently one of the most popular English language bands in Sri Lanka.

The Rebels were named a runner-up at TNL Onstage 2008.

Five Minutes Apart won Best Band at TNL Onstage in 2009. Their drummer, Darron Johnson, was named the best drummer.

Road Kill won Best Band at TNL Onstage in 2011.

Magician's Toolbox won best band at TNL Onstage in 2012. The band also won for Best Original Song.

Audacity won the title of Best Band in 2013. They were the first female band to do so in the history of the competition.

Constellation won best band TNL Onstage in 2014. Constellation created history in winning all major awards that year, which were Best Musician, Best Original Song, Best Look and the most prestigious award of the night, Best Band. Constellation was the first band to achieve this feat.

== Legacy ==
TNL Onstage has become a major staple of the music industry in Sri Lanka. Many professional musicians see Onstage as a perfect means of jumpstarting a local music career. In an article for the Sunday Times, keyboardist for the Rebels, Sandeep Milan John said of the experience, "We didn't win, but being placed runners-up has been enough to keep the gigs coming in."

=== TNL Radio Network ===
TNL first began broadcasting in 1993. The Network was the first in Asia to stream online, and now comprises three stations — TNL Radio, Lite FM, and Rhythm FM. TNL Radio includes a news department focusing on local coverage of the latest events in Sri Lankan politics and culture.
