= Ruth Waterbury =

American film critic

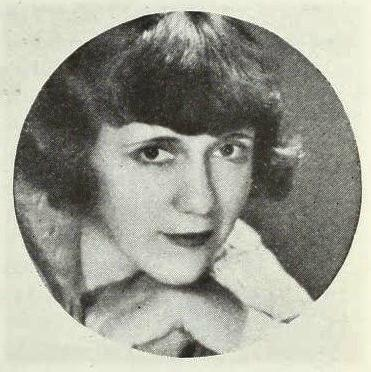
Ruth Waterbury, c. 1936

Ruth Waterbury (December 6, 1896, Rensselaer, New York – March 23, 1982, Newbury Park, California) was an American film critic and writer, best known for her work with Photoplay and Silver Screen magazines, and later, the Los Angeles Examiner, and The New York Daily News.

She was a critic and writer on Hollywood films for over 50 years, and was president of the Hollywood Women's Press Club five times. In the 1960s she published two biographies on Elizabeth Taylor and Richard Burton: Elizabeth Taylor: Her Life, Her Loves, Her Future (1961) and Richard Burton: His Intimate Story (1965).

Waterbury died in 1982, aged 85, and interred at Forest Lawn Memorial Park in the Hollywood Hills.
