= Ramesh Datla =

- రమేష్ దాట్ల
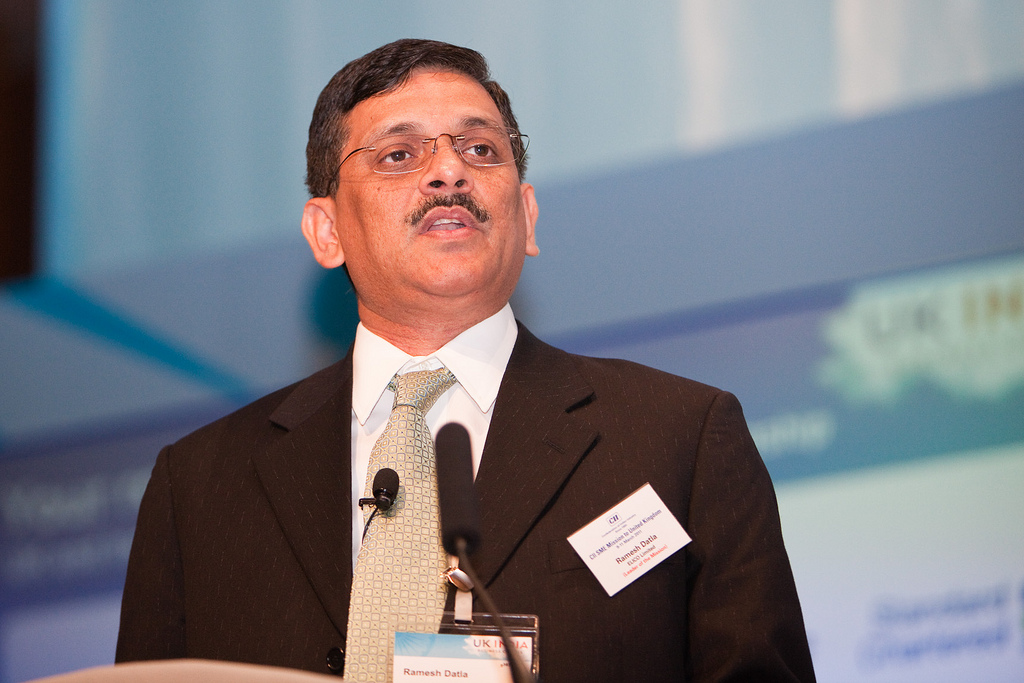
- Ramesh Datla addressing the UKIBC conference in Manchester, United Kingdom in 2011
- Born: 25 October 1961 (age 64)
- Education: MIT Sloan School of Management; Wichita State University; Indian Institute of Science
- Occupation: Entrepreneur
- Spouse: Vanitha Datla
- Website: ELICO; ELICO Healthcare Services

Ramesh Datla is an Indian industrialist and the Chairman of Elico Limited, India's first analytical instruments company, established in 1960. He also serves as Chairman of Elico Healthcare Services, a leading player in the healthcare IT and ITES sector.

He is actively involved with the Confederation of Indian Industry (CII), having held key positions such as Chairman of the CII National Committee on Intellectual Property Rights, past Chairman of the CII Southern Region, and the CII National MSME Council. He has represented India at various international forums, including the OECD Conference in Tokyo, the GTZ Conference in Berlin, and the B20 Working Group for the G20 Summit in France, among others.

== Early life and education ==
Born on 25 October 1961. Ramesh Datla holds a Doctorate in Instrumentation from SK University, Graduate in Executive Management from MIT Sloan School of Management, Post Graduate Diploma in Electronics Design Technology from Indian Institute of Science, a Master's in Electrical Engineering from Wichita State University.

== Career ==
Ramesh started his career at Cirrus Logic Inc, a semiconductor company located in Milpitas, California, USA before moving to India. Later he joined ELICO Limited and held several positions before taking over as managing director.

== Associations ==
- Member B20 Working Group as part of G20 Heads of State & Governments Summit 2012, Mexico.
- Member B20 Working Group as part of G20 Heads of State & Governments Summit 2011, France.
- Chairman, Confederation of Indian Industry (CII) – National MSME Council.
- Member, National Board for MSME, Ministry of MSME, Govt. of India.
- Member, National Instrumentation Development Board (NIDB), Department of Science and Technology (DST), Govt. of India.
- Board of Director, State Bank of Hyderabad.
- Member, Advisory Board, Electronics & ICT Academy NIT Warangal
- Member, Governing Board, Jawaharlal Nehru Technological University, Hyderabad and Kakinada & Osmania University.

He also actively participated with following associations in past.

- Chairman, Bharatiya Yuva Shakti Trust (BYST) - Andhra Pradesh, Hyderabad.
- Chairman, Confederation of Indian Industry (CII) - Southern Region
- Chairman, Confederation of Indian Industry (CII) – National IPR Committee, New Delhi
- Chairman, Confederation of Indian Industry (CII) – National Membership Committee, New Delhi
- Chairman, Confederation of Indian Industry (CII) – National MSME Council, New Delhi
- Chairman, Confederation of Indian Industry (CII) – Andhra Pradesh State Council.
- Chairman, Employers" Federation of Southern India (EFSI) - AP, Hyderabad
- Chairman, Indo-American Chamber of Commerce (IACC-AP).
- President, ISA-The Instrumentation, Systems, and Automation Society, Hyderabad Section
- President, Electronic Industries Association of A.P.
