= List of UK Country Albums Chart number ones of 2006 =

These are the Official Charts Company's UK Country Albums Chart number ones of 2007. The chart week runs from Friday to Thursday with the chart-date given as the following Thursday. Chart positions are based the multi-metric consumption of country music in the United Kingdom, blending traditional album sales, track equivalent albums, and streaming equivalent albums. The chart contains 20 positions.

== Chart history ==
Issue date	Album	Artist(s)	Record label	Ref.
26 February	Those Were the Days	Dolly Parton	EMI Records	
5 March	Those Were the Days	Dolly Parton	EMI Records	
12 March	Pay the Devil	Van Morrison	Lost Highway	
19 March	Pay the Devil	Van Morrison	Lost Highway	
26 March	Pay the Devil	Van Morrison	Lost Highway	
2 April	Pay the Devil	Van Morrison	Lost Highway	
9 April	Pay the Devil	Van Morrison	Lost Highway	
16 April	Pay the Devil	Van Morrison	Lost Highway	
23 April	Pay the Devil	Van Morrison	Lost Highway	
30 April	The Jukebox Years	Daniel O'Donnell	DMG TV	
7 May	The Jukebox Years	Daniel O'Donnell	DMG TV	
14 May	The Jukebox Years	Daniel O'Donnell	DMG TV	
21 May	The Jukebox Years	Daniel O'Donnell	DMG TV	
28 May	Pay the Devil	Van Morrison	Exile	
4 June	American IV: The Man Comes Around	Johnny Cash	American Recordings	
11 June	Whatever We Wanna	LeAnn Rimes	Curb Records	
18 June	Taking the Long Way	Dixie Chicks	Open Wide Records	
25 June	Taking the Long Way	Dixie Chicks	Open Wide Records	
2 July	Taking the Long Way	Dixie Chicks	Open Wide Records	
9 July	American V: A Hundred Highways	Johnny Cash	American Recordings	
16 July	American V: A Hundred Highways	Johnny Cash	American Recordings	
23 July	American V: A Hundred Highways	Johnny Cash	American Recordings	
30 July	American V: A Hundred Highways	Johnny Cash	American Recordings	
6 August	American V: A Hundred Highways	Johnny Cash	American Recordings	
13 August	American V: A Hundred Highways	Johnny Cash	American Recordings	
20 August	American V: A Hundred Highways	Johnny Cash	American Recordings	
27 August	Taking the Long Way	Dixie Chicks	Open Wide	
3 September	American V: A Hundred Highways	Johnny Cash	American Recordings	
10 September	American V: A Hundred Highways	Johnny Cash	American Recordings	
17 September	Heart and Soul	Charlie Landsborough	Rosette	
24 September	Heart and Soul	Charlie Landsborough	Rosette	
1 October	Heart and Soul	Charlie Landsborough	Rosette	
8 October	Heart and Soul	Charlie Landsborough	Rosette	
15 October	Heart and Soul	Charlie Landsborough	Rosette	
22 October	Water & Bridges	Kenny Rogers	Capitol Records	
29 October	Water & Bridges	Kenny Rogers	Capitol Records	
5 November	Water & Bridges	Kenny Rogers	Capitol Records	
12 November	Water & Bridges	Kenny Rogers	Capitol Records	
19 November	Love, Pain & the Whole Crazy Thing	Keith Urban	Capitol Records	
26 November	Love, Pain & the Whole Crazy Thing	Keith Urban	Capitol Records	
3 December	Love, Pain & the Whole Crazy Thing	Keith Urban	Capitol Records	
10 December	American V: A Hundred Highways	Johnny Cash	American Recordings	
17 December	American V: A Hundred Highways	Johnny Cash	American Recordings	
24 December	American IV: The Man Comes Around	Johnny Cash	American Recordings	
31 December	American IV: The Man Comes Around	Johnny Cash	American Recordings	

== Most weeks at number one ==
Weeks at number one	Artist
21	Johnny Cash
8	Van Morrison
5	Charlie Landsborough
4	Daniel O'Donnell
4	Dixie Chicks
4	Kenny Rogers
3	Keith Urban
2	Dolly Parton

== See also ==
- List of UK Albums Chart number ones of 2006
- List of UK Dance Singles Chart number ones of 2006
- List of UK Album Downloads Chart number ones of 2006
- List of UK Independent Albums Chart number ones of 2006
- List of UK R&B Albums Chart number ones of 2006
- List of UK Rock & Metal Albums Chart number ones of 2006
- List of UK Compilation Chart number ones of the 2000s
