= List of UK Independent Singles Chart number ones of 2006 =

The UK Indie Chart is a weekly chart that ranks the biggest-selling singles that are released on independent record labels in the United Kingdom. The chart is compiled by the Official Charts Company, and is based on both physical and digital single sales. During 2006, 36 singles reached number one.

The biggest-selling indie hit of the year was "JCB" by Nizlopi, which sold over 146,000 copies during 2006, despite having been released the previous year. Other high-selling indie hits included "Love Don't Let Me Go (Walking Away)" by David Guetta vs. The Egg, which sold 132,000 singles and reached the top three of the UK Singles Chart, and "When the Sun Goes Down" by Arctic Monkeys, which sold over 123,000 copies and reached number one on the UK Singles Chart.

Eight acts managed to top the UK Indie Chart with two different singles. They were: Embrace, Franz Ferdinand, The Raconteurs, Arctic Monkeys, Bob Sinclar, ¡Forward, Russia! and The Long Blondes. Morrissey was the only act to reach number one with three different singles, namely "You Have Killed Me", "In The Future When All's Well" and "I Just Want to See the Boy Happy".

== Chart history ==
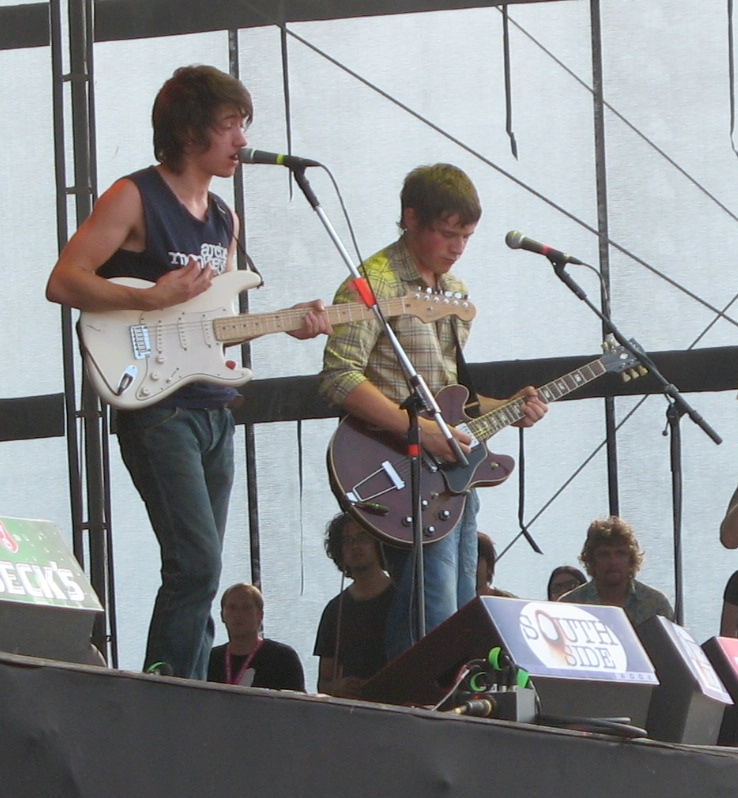
British band Arctic Monkeys had one of the biggest-selling indie tracks of the year with "When the Sun Goes Down".

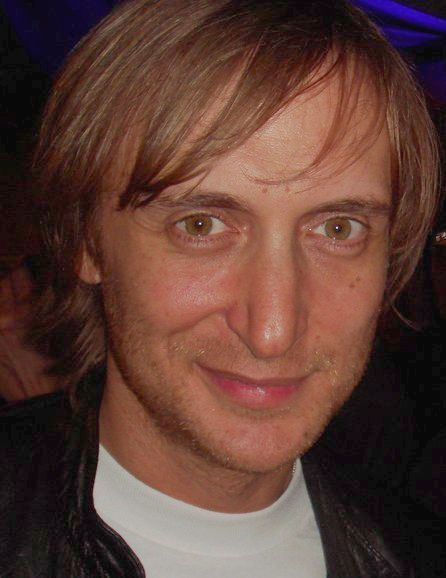
French DJ David Guetta spent three weeks at the top of the UK Indie Chart during 2006.

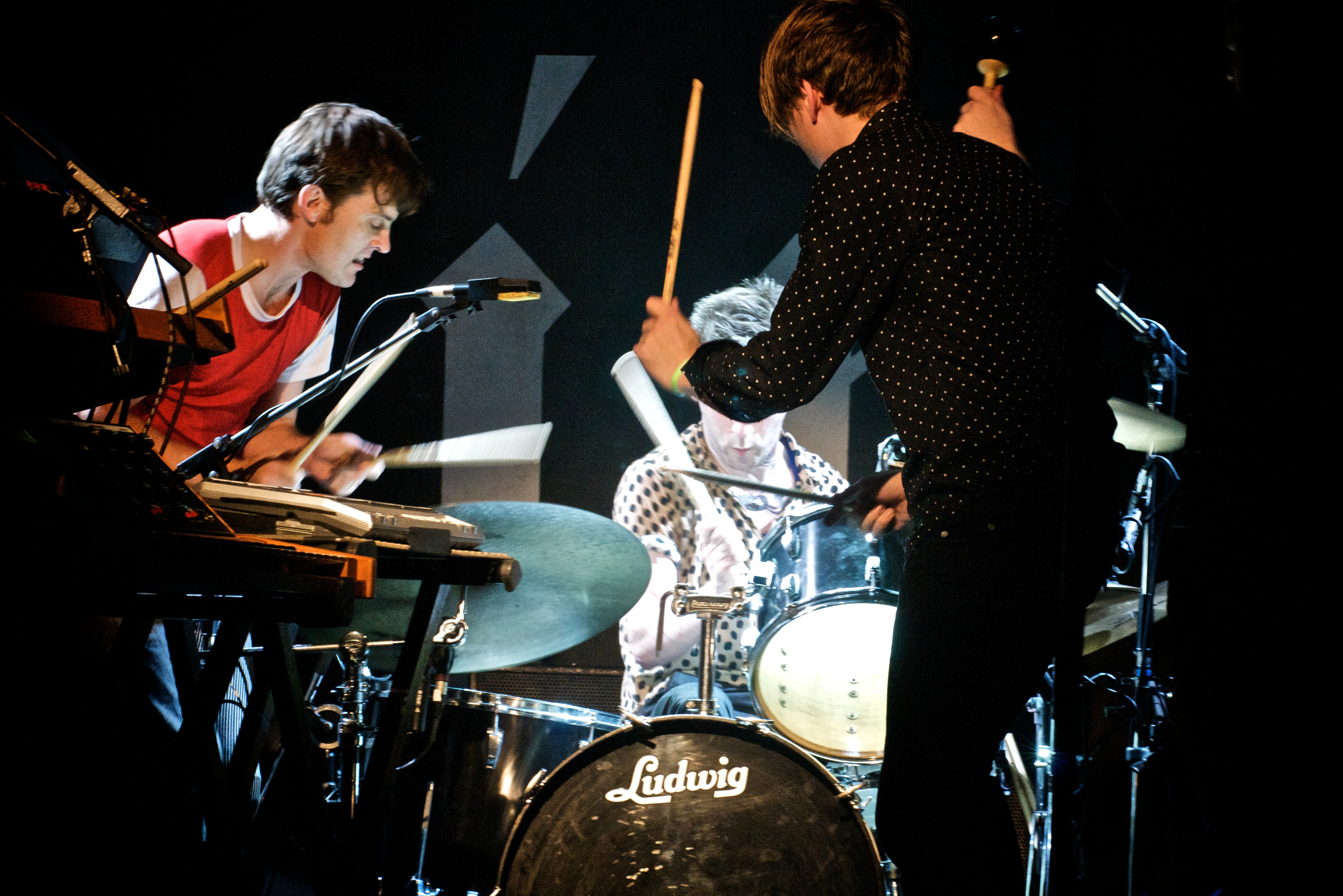
Franz Ferdinand topped the UK Indie Chart twice in 2006.

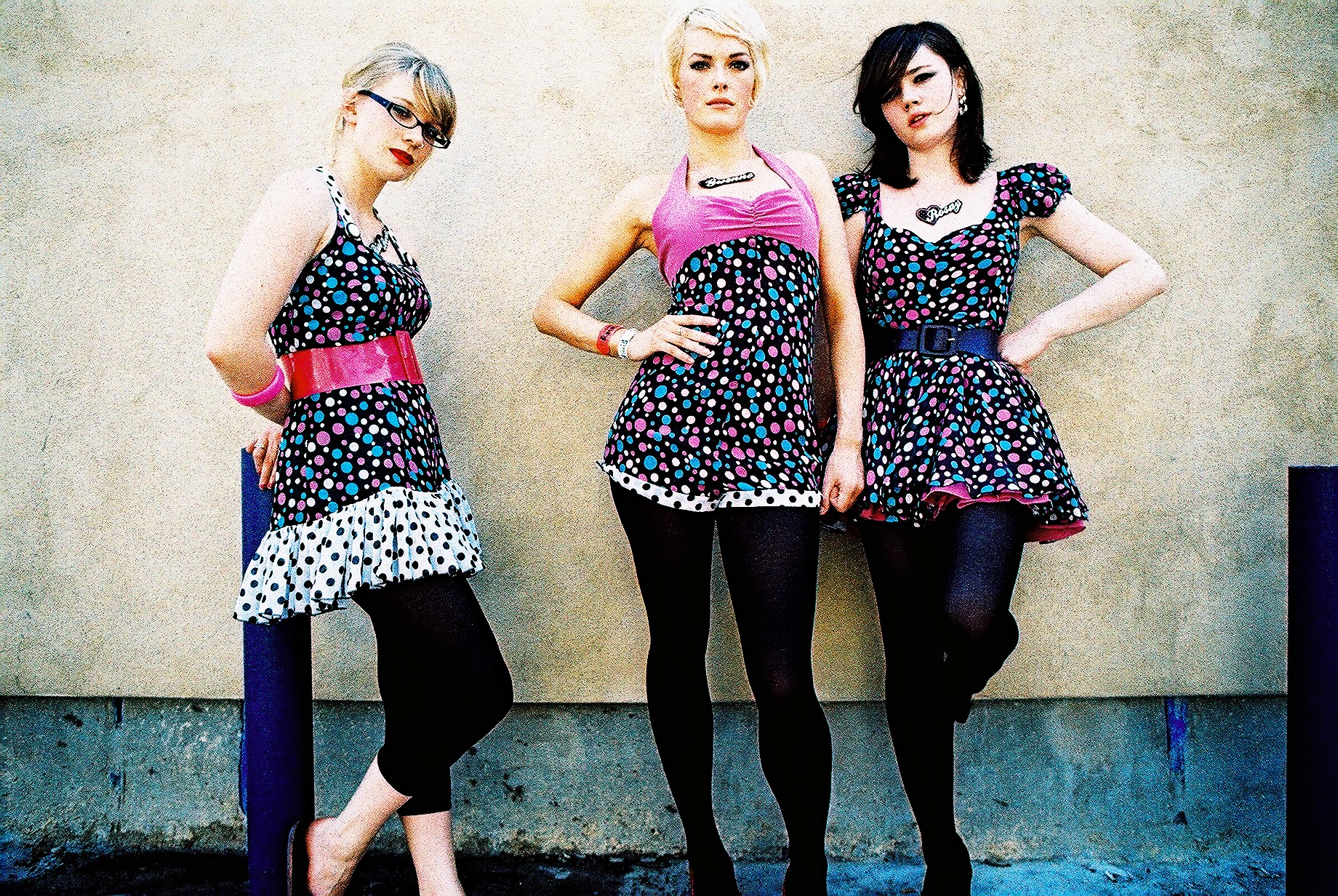
British band The Pipettes had their first indie number one in October 2006.

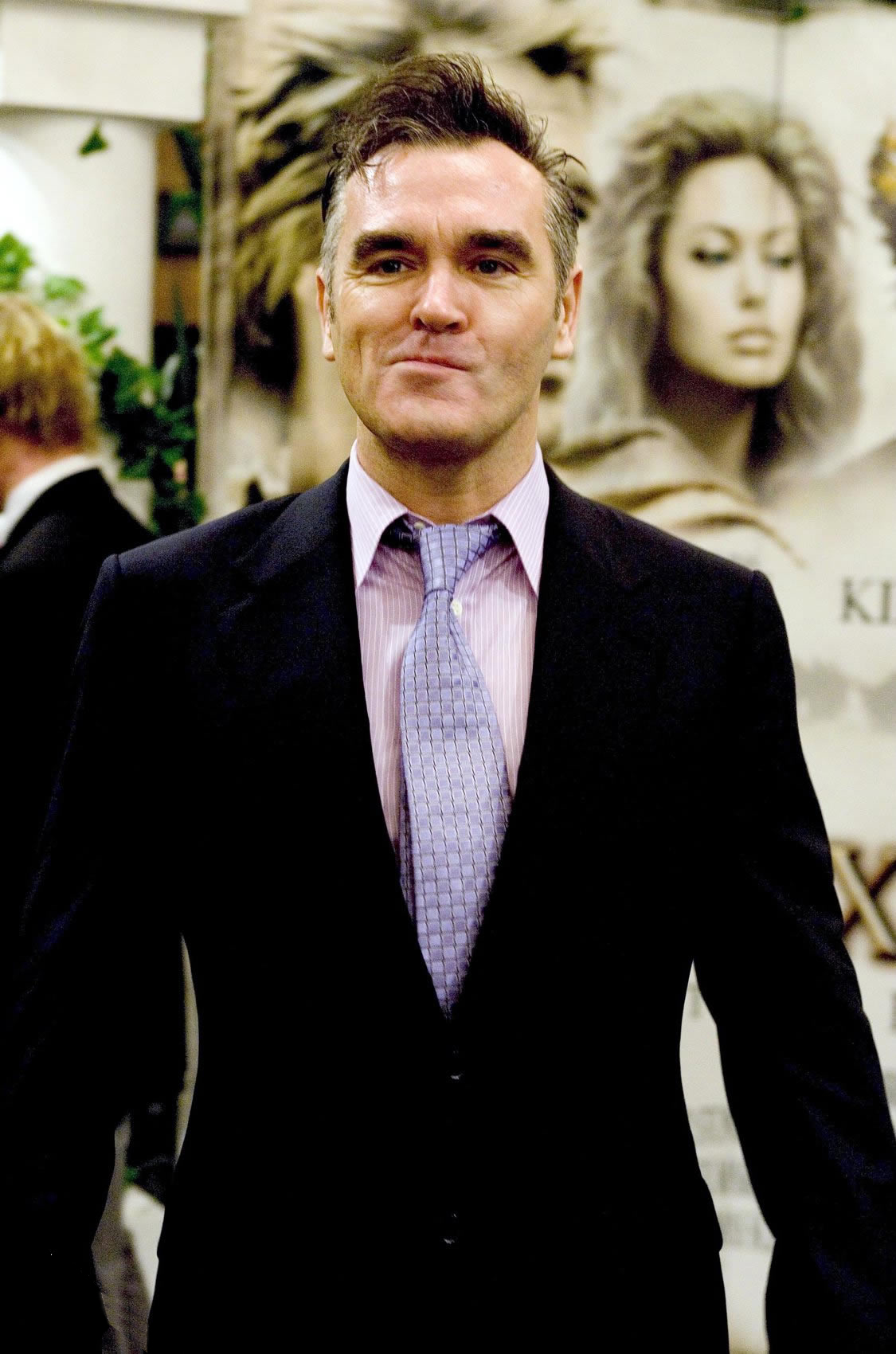
Morrissey reached number one with three different singles during 2006.

Key
†	Best-selling indie single of the year

Issue date	Song	Artist(s)	Record label	Ref.
1 January	"JCB" †	Nizlopi	FDM	
8 January	"JCB" †	Nizlopi	FDM	
15 January	"JCB" †	Nizlopi	FDM	
22 January ^{[a]}	"When the Sun Goes Down"	Arctic Monkeys	Domino	
29 January	"When the Sun Goes Down"	Arctic Monkeys	Domino	
5 February	"When the Sun Goes Down"	Arctic Monkeys	Domino	
12 February	"Say Say Say (Waiting 4 U)"	Hi-Tack	Gusto	
19 February	"JCB" †	Nizlopi	FDM	
26 February	"I Want You to Stay"	Maximo Park	Warp	
5 March	"All Too Human"	The Rakes	Dim Mak	
12 March	"Repeated Offender"	The Rifles	Red Ink	
19 March	"One Wish"	Ray J	Sanctuary	
26 March	"Nature's Law"	Embrace	Independiente	
2 April	"You Have Killed Me"	Morrissey	Attack	
9 April	"The Fallen" / "L. Wells"	Franz Ferdinand	Domino	
16 April	"C'mon Get It On"	Studio B	Loaded	
23 April	"Most Precious Love"	Blaze featuring Barbara Tucker	Defected	
30 April	"Steady, As She Goes"	The Raconteurs	XL	
7 May	"Steady, As She Goes"	The Raconteurs	XL	
14 May	"Hideaway"	Delays	Rough Trade	
21 May	"Air Guitar"	Towers of London	TVT	
28 May	"What? What You Got?"	Little Man Tate	Yellow Van	
4 June	"Stan's World Cup Song"	Stan Boardman	Harkit	
11 June	"World at Your Feet"	Embrace	Independiente	
18 June	"My My My"	Armand Van Helden featuring Tara McDonald	Southern Fried	
25 June	"Rooftops (A Liberation Broadcast)"	Lostprophets	Visible Noise	
2 July	"Weekend Without Makeup"	The Long Blondes	Rough Trade	
9 July	"World, Hold On (Children of the Sky)"	Bob Sinclar featuring Steve Edwards	Defected	
16 July	"World, Hold On (Children of the Sky)"	Bob Sinclar featuring Steve Edwards	Defected	
23 July	"Eleanor Put Your Boots On"	Franz Ferdinand	Domino	
30 July	"Eighteen"	¡Forward, Russia!	Dance to the Radio	
6 August	"Hands"	The Raconteurs	XL	
13 August	"Hands"	The Raconteurs	XL	
20 August	"Leave Before the Lights Come On"	Arctic Monkeys	Domino	
27 August	"In the Future When All's Well"	Morrissey	Attack	
3 September	"Love Don't Let Me Go (Walking Away)"	David Guetta vs. The Egg	Gusto	
10 September	"Love Don't Let Me Go (Walking Away)"	David Guetta vs. The Egg	Gusto	
17 September	"Target"	Embrace	Independiente	
24 September	"Love Don't Let Me Go (Walking Away)"	David Guetta vs. The Egg	Gusto	
1 October	"Judy"	The Pipettes	Memphis Industries	
8 October	"Rock This Party (Everybody Dance Now)"	Bob Sinclar and Cutee B	Defected	
15 October	"Rock This Party (Everybody Dance Now)"	Bob Sinclar and Cutee B	Defected	
22 October	"Generator"	The Holloways	TVT	
29 October	"Once and Never Again"	The Long Blondes	Rough Trade	
5 November	"Janie Jones (Strummerville)"	Babyshambles	B-Unique	
12 November	"I Found Out"	The Pigeon Detectives	Dance to the Radio	
19 November	"Nineteen"	¡Forward, Russia!	Dance to the Radio	
26 November	"Sticky Honey"	Juliette and the Licks	Hassle	
3 December	"The Cure and the Cause"	Fish Go Deep featuring Tracey K	Defected	
10 December	"I Just Want to See the Boy Happy"	Morrissey	Attack	
17 December	"Bing Bang (Time to Dance)"	LazyTown	Gut	
24 December	"Bing Bang (Time to Dance)"	LazyTown	Gut	
31 December	"The Photos on My Wall"	Good Shoes	Brille	

== Notes ==
- ^{a} – The single was simultaneously number-one on the singles chart.

== See also ==
- List of UK Dance Singles Chart number ones of 2006
- List of UK Dance Albums Chart number ones of 2006
- List of UK Singles Downloads Chart number ones of the 2000s
- List of UK Rock & Metal Singles Chart number ones of 2006
- List of UK Singles Chart number ones of the 2000s
