= List of UK Independent Albums Chart number ones of 2006 =

These are the Official Charts Company's UK Indie Chart number-one albums of 2006.

== Chart history ==
Issue date	Album	Artist(s)	Record label	Ref.
1 January	The Singles	Basement Jaxx	XL	
8 January	First Impressions of Earth	The Strokes	Rough Trade	
15 January	First Impressions of Earth	The Strokes	Rough Trade	
22 January	Veneer	José González	Imperial Recordings	
29 January	Whatever People Say I Am, That's What I'm Not	Arctic Monkeys	Domino	
5 February	Whatever People Say I Am, That's What I'm Not	Arctic Monkeys	Domino	
12 February	Whatever People Say I Am, That's What I'm Not	Arctic Monkeys	Domino	
19 February	Whatever People Say I Am, That's What I'm Not	Arctic Monkeys	Domino	
26 February	Whatever People Say I Am, That's What I'm Not	Arctic Monkeys	Domino	
5 March	Whatever People Say I Am, That's What I'm Not	Arctic Monkeys	Domino	
12 March	Whatever People Say I Am, That's What I'm Not	Arctic Monkeys	Domino	
19 March	Whatever People Say I Am, That's What I'm Not	Arctic Monkeys	Domino	
26 March	Whatever People Say I Am, That's What I'm Not	Arctic Monkeys	Domino	
2 April	This New Day	Embrace	Independiente	
9 April	Ringleader of the Tormentors	Morrissey	Attack	
16 April	Ringleader of the Tormentors	Morrissey	Attack	
23 April	Simpatico	The Charlatans	Creole	
30 April	Whatever People Say I Am, That's What I'm Not	Arctic Monkeys	Domino	
7 May	Whatever People Say I Am, That's What I'm Not	Arctic Monkeys	Domino	
14 May	Whatever People Say I Am, That's What I'm Not	Arctic Monkeys	Domino	
21 May	Broken Boy Soldiers	The Raconteurs	XL	
28 May	Broken Boy Soldiers	The Raconteurs	XL	
4 June	Broken Boy Soldiers	The Raconteurs	XL	
11 June	Broken Boy Soldiers	The Raconteurs	XL	
18 June	Catch-Flame!	Paul Weller	Yep Roc	
25 June	The Greatest Hits – Why Try Harder	Fatboy Slim	Skint	
2 July	Liberation Transmission	Lostprophets	Visible Noise	
9 July	Liberation Transmission	Lostprophets	Visible Noise	
16 July	The Eraser	Thom Yorke	XL	
23 July	The Eraser	Thom Yorke	XL	
30 July	The Greatest Hits – Why Try Harder	Fatboy Slim	Skint	
6 August	The Greatest Hits – Why Try Harder	Fatboy Slim	Skint	
13 August	Broken Boy Soldiers	The Raconteurs	XL	
20 August	Broken Boy Soldiers	The Raconteurs	XL	
27 August	Never Said Goodbye	Cerys Matthews	Rough Trade	
3 September	Whatever People Say I Am, That's What I'm Not	Arctic Monkeys	Domino	
10 September	Crazy Itch Radio	Basement Jaxx	XL	
17 September	Whatever People Say I Am, That's What I'm Not	Arctic Monkeys	Domino	
24 September	The Greatest Hits – Why Try Harder	Fatboy Slim	Skint	
1 October	The Greatest Hits – Why Try Harder	Fatboy Slim	Skint	
8 October	The Greatest Hits – Why Try Harder	Fatboy Slim	Skint	
15 October	Yours to Keep	Albert Hammond Jr.	Rough Trade	
22 October	Broken Boy Soldiers	The Raconteurs	XL	
29 October	Broken Boy Soldiers	The Raconteurs	XL	
5 November	So This Is Great Britain?	The Holloways	TVT	
12 November	Someone to Drive You Home	The Long Blondes	Rough Trade	
19 November	Jarvis	Jarvis Cocker	Rough Trade	
26 November	Orphans: Brawlers, Bawlers & Bastards	Tom Waits	Anti	
3 December	Jarvis	Jarvis Cocker	Rough Trade	
10 December	Piece by Piece	Katie Melua	Dramatico	
17 December	Piece by Piece	Katie Melua	Dramatico	
24 December	Piece by Piece	Katie Melua	Dramatico	
31 December	Hold Your Colour	Pendulum	Breakbeat Kaos	

== See also ==
- List of number-one albums of 2006 (UK)
- List of UK Independent Singles Chart number ones of 2006
- List of UK Rock Chart number-one albums of 2006
- List of UK R&B Albums Chart number ones of 2006
