= Sir Henry's =

Former bar and nightclub in Cork, Ireland

- Nightclub logo
- Location: South Main Street, Cork, Ireland
- Coordinates: 51.8962°N 8.4763°W
- Owner: Jerry Lucey
- Type: Nightclub, music venue, bar
- Opened: 1978
- Closed: 2003

Sir Henry's was a bar and nightclub on South Main Street in Cork, Ireland. It was founded by Jerry Lucey in 1978. The name was derived from Henry O'Shea, a baker and building owner in the South Main Street area of Cork city. The club was known for its house, trance, R&B, hip hop and regular live rock concerts. Gigs held there included a number by The Golden Horde, Toasted Heretic, Sonic Youth with support band Nirvana, Therapy?, The Wedding Present and The Fall.

During late 1980s, the club ran a series of three-night long acid house weekenders, which attracted DJs such as Laurent Garnier, Shades of Rhythm and Justin Robertson. From the mid 1990s the music tended towards deep house.

Henry's closed in June 2003 and the building was demolished soon afterwards.

== Early years ==
Sir Henrys was a rock bar for most of the 1980s. The club at the time also held gigs by an older and more traditional "pub rock" element, but this scene had died out by the mid 1980s, as post-punk bands such as Nun Attax (later Five Go Down to the Sea?) grew in prominence.

Many of Ireland's up-and-coming young bands performed here and the 'Battle of the Bands' was held there for a number of years where unsigned talent competed for a recording contract. Artists that performed there over these years included Phil Lynott, John Martyn, ex-Clash Mick Jones' Big Audio Dynamite, The Pogues and The Sisters of Mercy.

On 20 August 1991, Sonic Youth played Sir Henry's, supported by the then virtually unknown band Nirvana. Some scenes were featured in the documentary 1991: The Year Punk Broke.

== Dance venue ==
As dance music became more popular and the demand for small venue live gigs decreased, Sir Henry's became a venue for the "Sweat" night. Started in 1988 by Shane Johnson and Greg Dowling, this was to become one of the top clubs in Europe in the early 1990s, supplemented with the addition of the Back Bar with DJ's such as Donkeyman (Mark Ring) and Stephen Grainger (Stevie G).

Over the 1990s, Sweat built up an international reputation, being variously described as "a gorgeous blend of underground house" (i-D), a "deep house frenzy" (The Face) and "the best music on that side of the Irish Sea" (DJ Magazine). By the mid 1990s Sir Henry’s had become a house venue, playing host to some of genre's better known artists such as Kerri Chandler, Roger Sanchez, Glenn Underground, Cajmere, Derrick May, Migs, Fred Everything, Charles Webster, Kevin McKay, and Mike Pickering. The venue also hosted the "alternative" disco night Freakscene for many years. Sweat ended in 2001, and the venue closed in 2003.

The short independent films "120 bpm" and "The House That Cork Built" record the club's place in Irish House music. A research exhibition, titled Sir Henrys@UCC Library, was held in University College Cork during 2014.
