= Fish Go Deep =

Irish musical duo

- Origin: Cork, Ireland
- Genres: House, deep house, Chicago house
- Occupation(s): DJ, producer, remixer
- Years active: 1988–present
- Labels: Go Deep, Ork Recordings
- Members: Greg Dowling; Shane Johnson
- Website: fishgodeep.com

Fish Go Deep are an Irish production duo consisting of Greg Dowling and Shane Johnson from Cork city. They have been releasing house records under this name since 1997 and in 2006 reached number 1 on both the UK dance chart and indie chart and also reached number 23 in the singles chart with their track "The Cure and the Cause", with singer and co-songwriter Tracey K.

Both Dowling and Johnson played an integral part in the emergence of house music in Cork City between 1988 and 2001, and ran the "Sweat" night at Sir Henrys, which attracted acts such as Kerri Chandler, Arnold Jarvis, Laurent Garnier, DJ Deep, Jerome Sydenham, Roger Sanchez, Glenn Underground, Boo Williams, Cajmere, Gemini, Derrick May, Kevin Yost, Migs, Rasoul and Fred Everything.

== Discography ==
=== Albums ===
Year	Title	Label
2004	Lil' Hand	Ultrasound Recordings
2012	Draw the Line	
2021	This Bit of Earth	

=== Singles and EPs ===
Year	Title	Label	Notes
1994	"In Motion"	Red Records	under Fishgotech alias
1995	"Silver"	Red Records	under Fishgotech alias
1997	Vol. 1	Eventual Records	as Fish Go Deep
2000	"Flying Funk"	i! Records	as Fish Go Deep
2001	"Half Step"	Brique Rouge	as Fish Go Deep
2001	"Let's Go Back"	Chez Music	as Fish Go Deep
2001	"Music's Got Me"	Gourmet Recordings	as Fish Go Deep
2001	"Set the Night On"	i! Records	as Fish Go Deep
2001	"There for Me"	i! Records	as Fish Go Deep
2002	"How Do You Feel?"	Elevation Recordings	as Fish Go Deep
2002	"No Big Deal / Dollface"	Brique Rouge	as Fish Go Deep
2002	"The Jazz"	i! Records	as Fish Go Deep
2002	"Sin’s I’ve Lost"	Imperial Dub Recordings	as DSP
2003	"3 Miles"	Attic Space	as Fish Go Deep
2003	"Nights Like These"	Inspirit Music	as Fish Go Deep
2003	"The Layback"	i! Records	as Fish Go Deep
2003	Sound Scapes: Ireland	Deep House Network Records	as Fish Go Deep
2004	"2 Dings / Andavar"	Gourmet Recordings	as Fish Go Deep
2004	"Hey Mr California"	Blusoul Music	as Fish Go Deep
2005	"Culture Bug"	Ork Recordings	as Fish Go Deep
2005	"The Cure and the Cause"	Go Deep	as Fish Go Deep
2005	"Battery Man"	Ultrasound Recordings	as Fish Go Deep
2006	"Soul"	Ork Recordings	as Fish Go Deep
2006	"Chemical God"	Go Deep	as Fish Go Deep
2006	"Wurk"	Ork Recordings	as Fish Go Deep
2007	"Disco / ESL"	Ork Recordings	as Fish Go Deep
2008	"Battery Man"	Go Deep	New mixes of the live classic.
2009	"Final Tide"	Go Deep	as Fish Go Deep

== Sources ==
- Fish Go Deep Interview on DHN (2004). Retrieved 23 August 2008.
- DHN Article on Go Deep in Fast Eddies. Retrieved 23 August 2008.
- Fish Go Deep Interview on NiteFeva.com. Retrieved 24 August 2008.
