= UK Album Downloads Chart =

Album sales chart

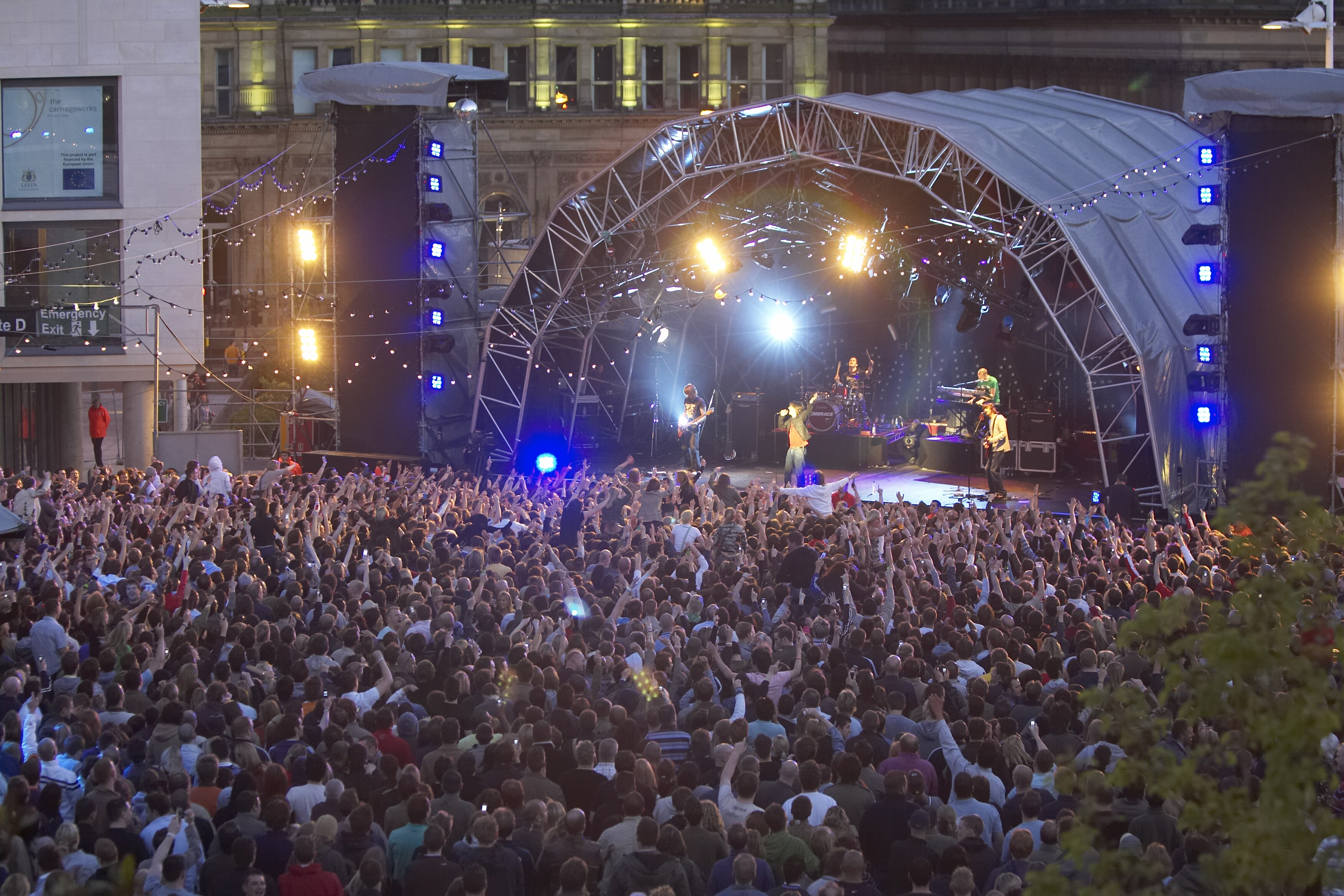
In April 2006, English alternative rock band Embrace (pictured on stage) became the first act to top the UK Album Downloads Chart, with their album This New Day.

The UK Album Downloads Chart is compiled by the Official Charts on behalf of the British music industry. Since July 2015, the chart week runs from Friday to Thursday, with the chart date given as the following Thursday. The chart was introduced in April 2006 to coincide with the OCC's decision to include sales of album downloads in the UK Albums Chart. The first album to top the download chart was This New Day by Embrace.

The chart is published in Music Week, UKChartsPlus and on the OC's official website, with the former featuring the Top 75 downloads and the top 100 in the latter two. The chart only uses sales of permanent digital downloads, that is album-downloads on non-subscription online music stores.

== History ==
Before the inauguration of the download chart, only sales of physical formats—such as CD, vinyl and cassette tape—contributed towards an album's position on the UK Albums Chart. In 2004, in response to falling physical sales of singles, a downloads-only singles chart was introduced by the Official Charts Company (OCC); the following year, downloads were implemented into the UK Singles Chart.

In the first three months of 2006, more than 825,000 albums were legally downloaded, almost half of the entire total downloaded in 2005. In response, a digital albums chart was launched in April 2006, alongside the OCC's decision to include downloads in the regular chart. On 9 April 2006, English alternative rock band Embrace topped the first ever UK Album Downloads Chart with their fifth studio album This New Day, which sold around 1,200 digital copies.

== Criteria for inclusion ==
- The album must be more than three tracks or 20 minutes long and not be classed as a budget album. A budget album costs between £0.50 and £3.75.
- An Album Bundle without a physical component is eligible to appear in its own right in the Official Album Downloads Chart from release. Once again, this is only if all formats meet the chart rules.

== Most-downloaded by year ==
Year	Album	Artist	Record label	Ref.
2006	Eyes Open	Snow Patrol	Universal	
2007	Back to Black	Amy Winehouse	Universal	
2008	Viva la Vida or Death and All His Friends	Coldplay	EMI	
2009	The Fame	Lady Gaga	Universal	
2010	Sigh No More	Mumford & Sons	Universal	
2011	21	Adele	Beggars	
2012	Unknown	Unknown	Unknown	
2013	Bad Blood	Bastille	Universal	
2014	x	Ed Sheeran	Warner	
2015	25	Adele	Beggars	
2016	25	Adele	Beggars	
2017	Unknown	Unknown	Unknown	
2018	The Greatest Showman	Motion Picture Cast Recording	Warner	
2019	Unknown	Unknown	Unknown	
2020	Unknown	Unknown	Unknown	
2021	Unknown	Unknown	Unknown	
2022	Unknown	Unknown	Unknown	
2023	Trustfall	Pink	Sony	
2024	Moon Music	Coldplay	Warner	
2025	The Life of a Showgirl	Taylor Swift	EMI	

== See also ==
- Lists of UK Album Downloads Chart number ones
- UK Albums Chart
- UK Singles Downloads Chart
