= Tracey K =

Irish singer and songwriter

- Also known as: Tracey K Stacey K Kewher; T.Kelliher
- Born: Tracey Kelliher
- Origin: Tralee, County Kerry, Ireland
- Genres: House, deep house
- Occupations: Singer, songwriter
- Years active: 1998–present
- Labels: Go Deep, Defected, Strictly Rhythm, Ultrasound, Inspirit
- Website: Tracey K's Myspace

Tracey Kelliher is an Irish singer and songwriter best known for providing the vocals and lyrics for the UK Dance Chart hit "The Cure and the Cause".

== Career ==
Born and raised in Tralee, County Kerry, Kelliher attended university in Galway. There, she joined Dextris, a group consisting of two vocalists harmonising over house and hip-hop beats. In 2003, Kelliher collaborated with Shane Johnson and Greg Dowling of Fish Go Deep. Their first track was "Lil' Hand" which was later released as the title track on their debut album. Their first single release was "Nights Like These", on the UK Inspirit Music label in 2003. In 2004, Lil' Hand was released on Canadian label, Ultrasound Recordings. The single was remixed by Dennis Ferrer in 2005 and reached No. 23 on the UK Singles Chart and No. 1 on the Dance chart. The song was released in the U.S. on Strictly Rhythm in 2007.

== Discography ==
=== Albums ===
| Year | Title |
|---|---|
| 2004 | Lil' Hand (with Fish Go Deep) |

=== Singles ===
| Year | Title | Label |
|---|---|---|
| 2003 | "Nights Like These" | Inspirit UK |
| 2005 | "The Cure and the Cause" | Go Deep, Defected, Strictly Rhythm |
| 2007 | "Battery Man" | Go Deep |
| 2009 | "Final Tide" | Go Deep |
| 2010 | "A Dream" | Go Deep |
| 2011 | "Love Is You" (with DJ Meme Orchestra) | MN2S |
| 2011 | "Lovefool" (with Tiago Fragateiro) | Composite Records |
| 2011 | "Special" (with DJ Yellow & Tiago Fragateiro) | Composite Records |
