= Lil' Hand =

Studio album by Fish Go Deep & Tracey K
- Released: 22 November 2004
- Recorded: 2003–2004
- Genre: House, downtempo, deep house
- Length: 47:57
- Label: Ultrasound Recordings
- Producer: Fish Go Deep

Fish Go Deep & Tracey K chronology
Lil' Hand (2004)	TBA (2008)

Singles from Lil' Hand
- 1. "Cocoon"; 2. "Battery Man"; 3. "The Cure and the Cause"

Lil' Hand is the debut album from Fish Go Deep, that showcases their collaboration with Dublin-based vocalist/lyricist Tracey Kelliher. The album contains the hit "The Cure and the Cause", with which Fish Go Deep made their name known worldwide. Despite being best known for productions in the deep end of the house genre, in this album Fish Go Deep strayed off their beaten track into a more downtempo, chill out strain of electronic music. Tracey K states in an interview with Lady Duracell that Lil' Hand was "kinda half housey, half...something other."

== Track listing ==
1. "Battery Man" - 5:26
2. "1000 Dreams" - 3:13
3. "White Moon" - 3:48
4. "Winding Path" - 6:34
5. "Cocoon" - 4:38
6. "Change Your Mind" - 5:23
7. "The Cure and the Cause" - 3:48
8. "Lil' Hand" - 5:30
9. "Day in Debt" - 4:51
10. "Love's Cloth" - 4:46
