= List of UK Dance Albums Chart number ones of 2006 =

These are the Official Charts Company's UK Dance Chart number-one albums of 2006. The dates listed in the menus below represent the Saturday after the Sunday the chart was announced, as per the way the dates are given in chart publications such as the ones produced by Billboard, Guinness, and Virgin.

== Chart history ==
Issue date	Album	Artist(s)	Record label	Ref.
7 January	The Singles	Basement Jaxx	XL	
14 January	The Singles	Basement Jaxx	XL	
21 January	Confessions on a Dancefloor	Madonna	Warner	
28 January	Confessions on a Dancefloor	Madonna	Warner	
4 February	The Singles	Basement Jaxx	XL	
11 February	We Are Not The Infadels	Infadels	Wall of Sound	
18 February	Confessions on a Dancefloor	Madonna	Warner	
25 February	Confessions on a Dancefloor	Madonna	Warner	
4 March	Connected - 10 Year of Full Intention	Various Artists	In The House	
11 March	Soul Heaven - Masters at Work	Various Artists	Soul Heaven	
18 March	Confessions on a Dancefloor	Madonna	Warner	
25 March	Defected in the House - Miami 06	Various Artists	In The House	
1 April	Defected in the House - Miami 06	Various Artists	In The House	
8 April	Collected - The Best of	Massive Attack	Virgin	
15 April	Collected - The Best of	Massive Attack	Virgin	
22 April	Collected - The Best of	Massive Attack	Virgin	
29 April	Collected - The Best of	Massive Attack	Virgin	
6 May	Collected - The Best of	Massive Attack	Virgin	
13 May	Collected - The Best of	Massive Attack	Virgin	
20 May	Collected - The Best of	Massive Attack	Virgin	
27 May	GU 10	Various Artists	Global Underground	
3 June	Fundamental	Pet Shop Boys	Parlophone	
10 June	Fundamental	Pet Shop Boys	Parlophone	
17 June	Classic Euphoria	Various Artists	Ministry of Sound	
24 June	Clubbers Guide - Summer 2006	Various Artists	Ministry of Sound	
1 July	Why Try Harder - The Greatest Hits	Fatboy Slim	Skint	
8 July	Why Try Harder - The Greatest Hits	Fatboy Slim	Skint	
15 July	Why Try Harder - The Greatest Hits	Fatboy Slim	Skint	
22 July	Why Try Harder - The Greatest Hits	Fatboy Slim	Skint	
29 July	Renaissance 3D - Faithless	Various Artists	Renaissance	
5 August	Confessions on a Dancefloor	Madonna	Warner	
12 August	Confessions on a Dancefloor	Madonna	Warner	
19 August	Hed Kandi - The Mix - Summer 2006	Various Artists	Hed Kandi	
26 August	Hed Kandi - The Mix - Summer 2006	Various Artists	Hed Kandi	
2 September	Hed Kandi - The Mix - Summer 2006	Various Artists	Hed Kandi	
9 September	Hed Kandi - The Mix - Summer 2006	Various Artists	Hed Kandi	
16 September	Crazy Itch Radio	Basement Jaxx	XL	
23 September	Crazy Itch Radio	Basement Jaxx	XL	
30 September	Crazy Itch Radio	Basement Jaxx	XL	
7 October	Why Try Harder - The Greatest Hits	Fatboy Slim	Skint	
14 October	Dubai - Sharam - Gu29	Various Artists	Global Underground	
21 October	The Warning	Hot Chip	EMI	
28 October	We Are Glitter	Goldfrapp	Mute	
4 November	Disco Kandi	Various Artists	Hed Kandi	
11 November	The Annual 2007	Various Artists	Ministry of Sound	
18 November	The Annual 2007	Various Artists	Ministry of Sound	
25 November	The Annual 2007	Various Artists	Ministry of Sound	
2 December	Hed Kandi Classics	Various Artists	Hed Kandi	
9 December	To All New Arrivals	Faithless	Columbia	
16 December	To All New Arrivals	Faithless	Columbia	
23 December	Remixes	Depeche Mode	Mute	
30 December	The Anthems	Various Artists	UMTV	

== See also ==
- List of number-one albums of 2006 (UK)
- List of UK Dance Chart number-one singles of 2006
- List of UK R&B Chart number-one albums of 2006
