= I Can't Come Down =

Single by Embrace

from the album This New Day
- Released: 4 December 2006
- Genre: Alternative rock
- Length: 4:13
- Label: Independiente
- Songwriter(s): Danny McNamara, Richard McNamara
- Producer(s): Embrace

Embrace singles chronology
"Target" (2006)	"I Can't Come Down" (2006)	"Acoustic" (2014)

"I Can't Come Down" is a song by English rock band Embrace and the fourth and final single from their number-one selling album, This New Day. It was released on 4 December 2006 as the follow-up to "Target". The B-sides included various versions of "I Can't Come Down", "Contender" and a live recording of the recently written "Heart & Soul". The single peaked at #54 in the UK Singles Chart, making it the lowest charting single by the band to date and their first to miss the UK Top 40.

== Track listing ==
CD

1. I Can't Come Down
2. Contender (live at Birmingham Academy)
3. Heart & Soul (live at Manchester Academy)
4. I Can't Come Down (video)

7"

1. I Can't Come Down
- Download versions of "I Can't Come Down"
  - Radio Edit
  - Album Version
  - Live Version
  - Demo Version
  - Acoustic Version

== Charts ==
Chart (2006)	Peak position
UK Singles (OCC)	54
