= List of UK Dance Singles Chart number ones of 2006 =

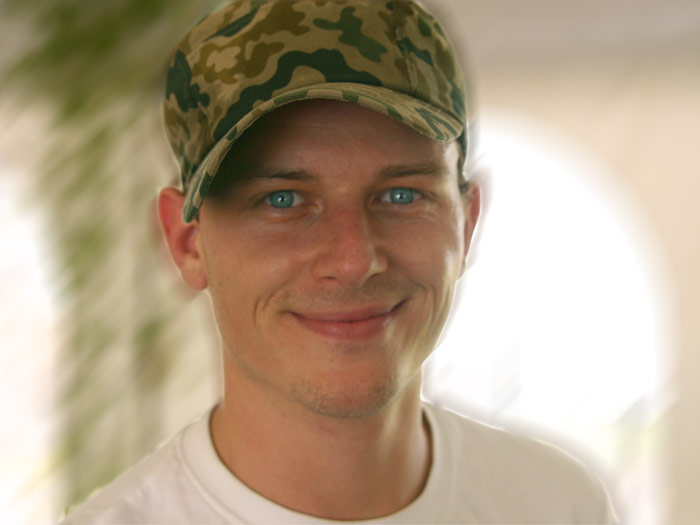
Dutch DJ Fedde le Grand had the biggest-selling dance hit of 2006 with his single "Put Your Hands Up for Detroit".

The UK Dance Chart is a weekly chart that ranks the biggest-selling dance singles in the United Kingdom, and is compiled by The Official Charts Company. The dates listed in the menus below represent the Saturday after the Sunday the chart was announced, as per the way the dates are given in chart publications such as the ones produced by Billboard, Guinness, and Virgin. In 2006, the chart was based on sales of CD singles and 12-inch singles, and was published in the UK magazines ChartsPlus and Music Week and on BBC Radio 1's official website. During the year, 31 singles reached number one.

The biggest-selling dance hit of 2006 was "Put Your Hands Up for Detroit" by Fedde le Grand—it sold approximately 184,000 copies in the UK and topped the UK Singles Chart. "Put Your Hands Up for Detroit" was also the longest-running number one of year, spending nine weeks at the top over six separate runs. Other high-selling dance singles included "Somebody's Watching Me" by Beatfreakz, which sold roughly 137,000 copies, and "Sorry" by Madonna, which sold approximately 136,000 singles. "Sorry" also topped the UK Singles Chart. Three acts topped the chart with more than one single. They were: Mylo, DJ Fresh and Madonna. The only act to top the chart with more than two singles was Madonna, who reached number one with three different singles during the year.

== Chart history ==
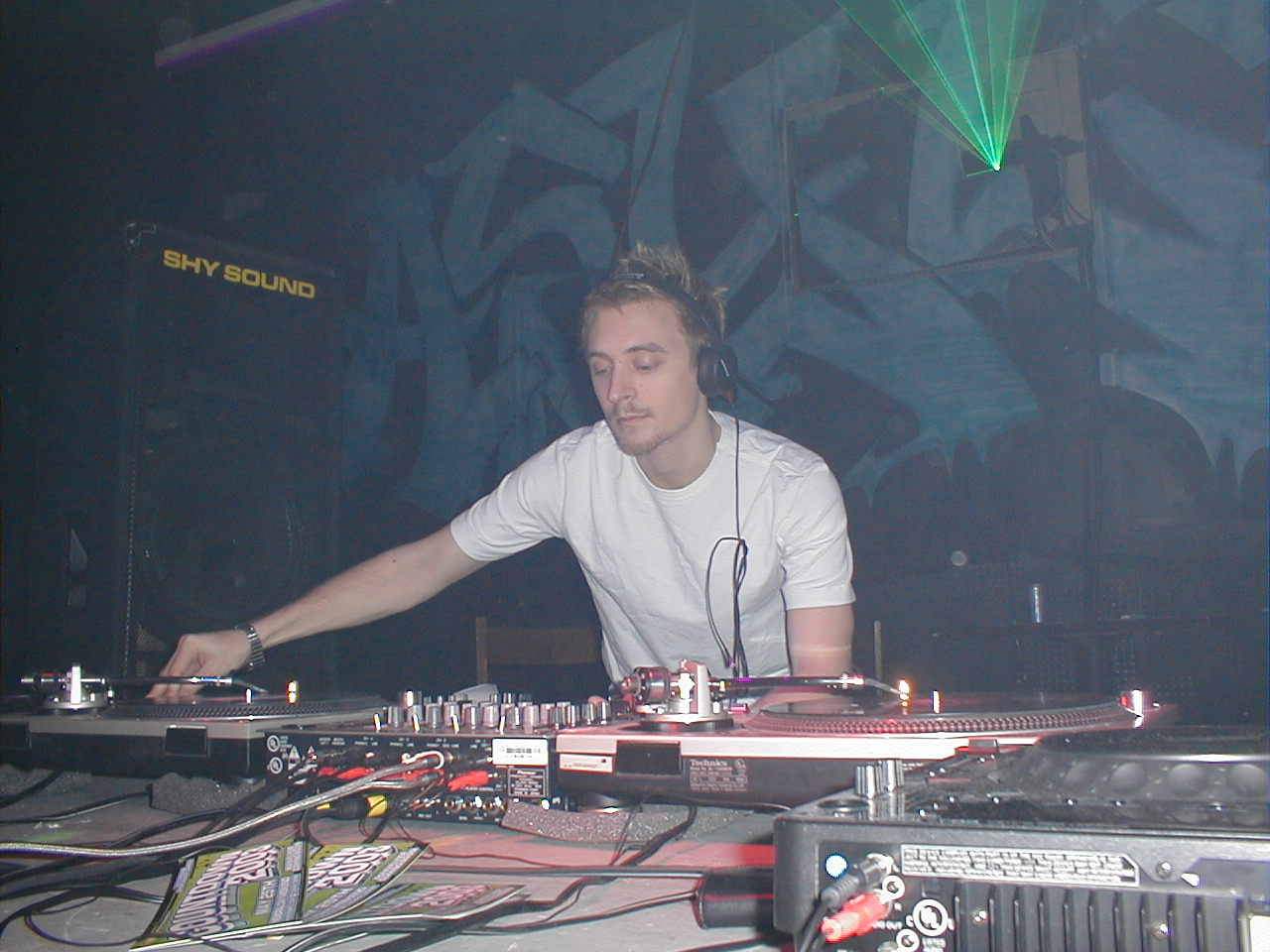
DJ Fresh was one of only two acts to top the UK Dance Chart with more than one single in 2006.

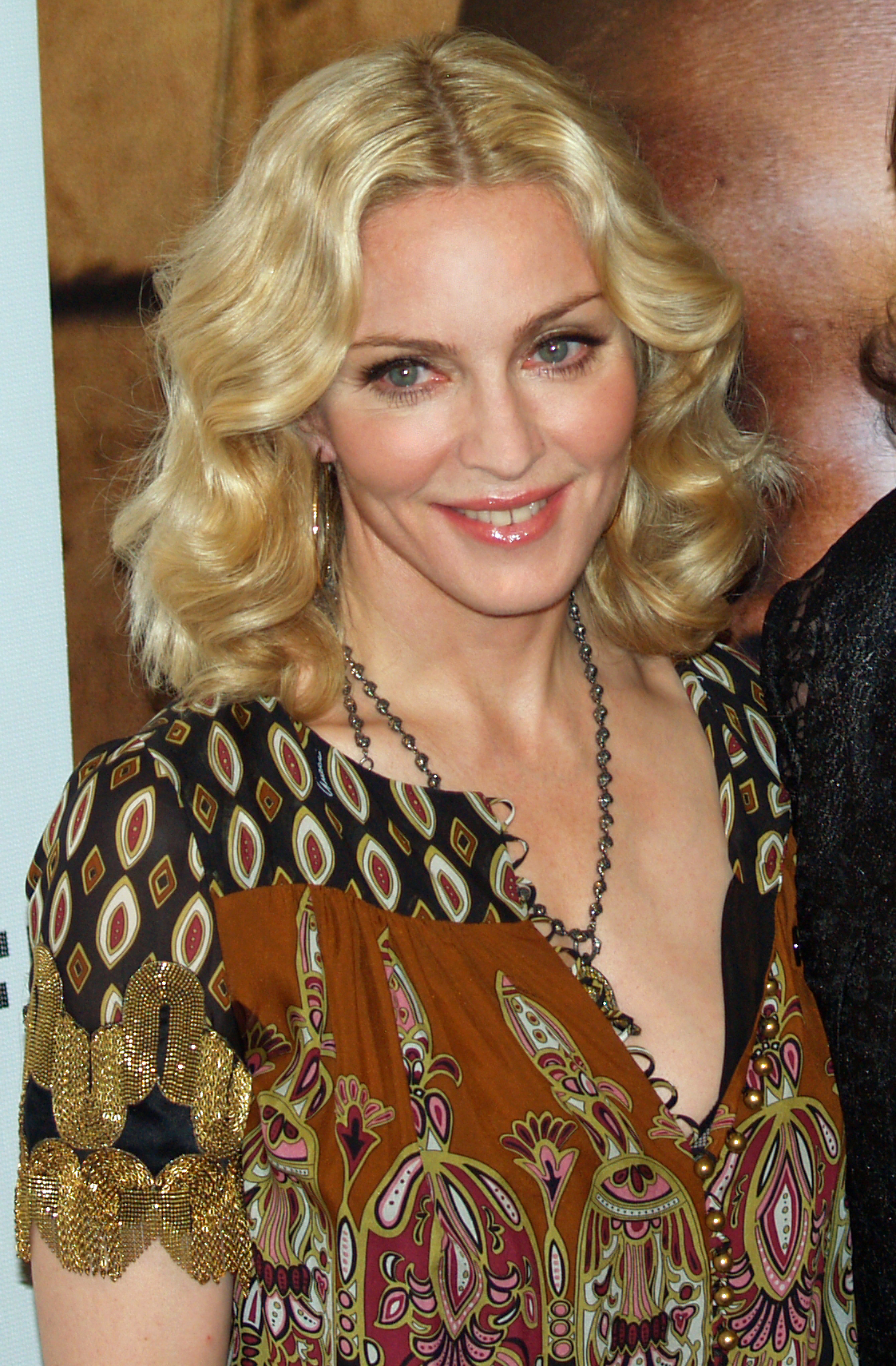
Madonna topped the dance chart three times during 2006.

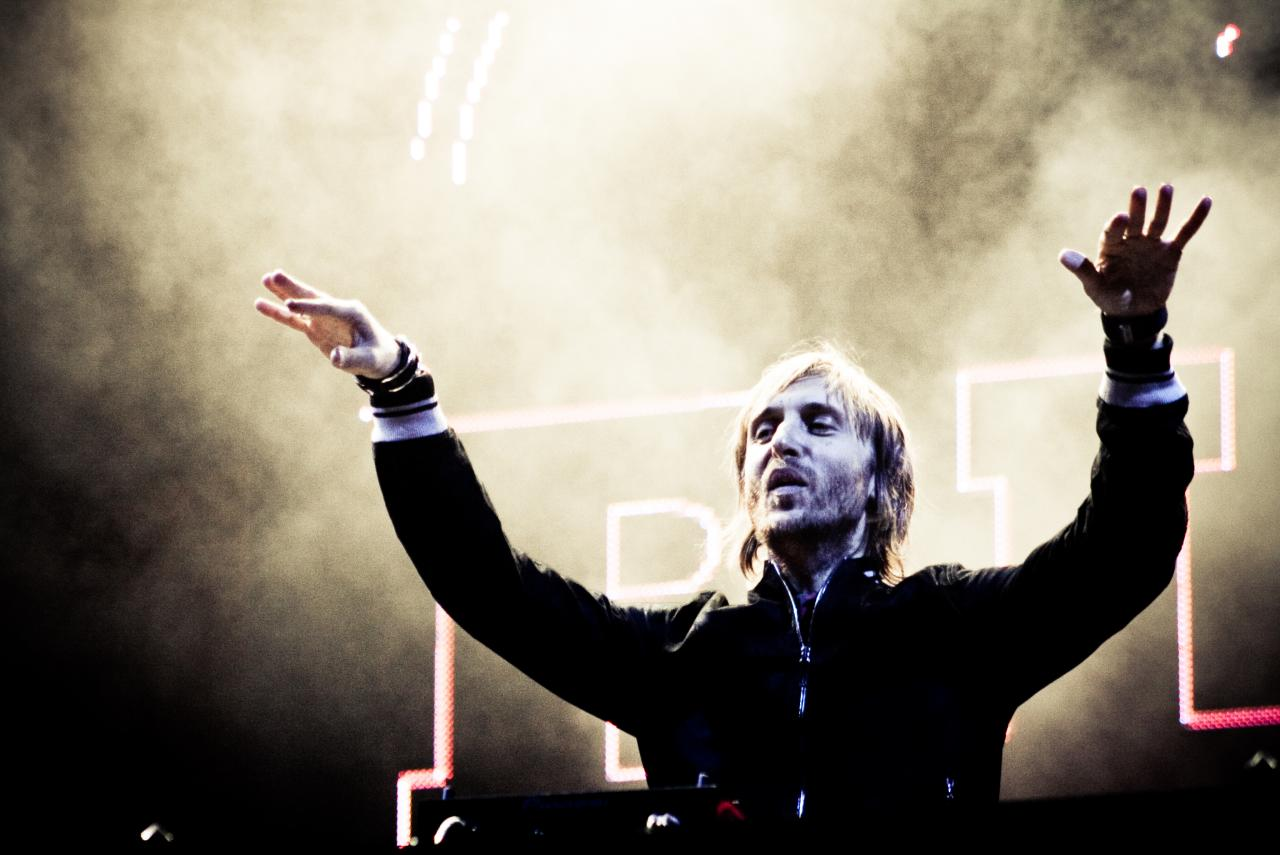
David Guetta had one of the biggest-selling dance hits of the year with "Love Don't Let Me Go (Walking Away)".

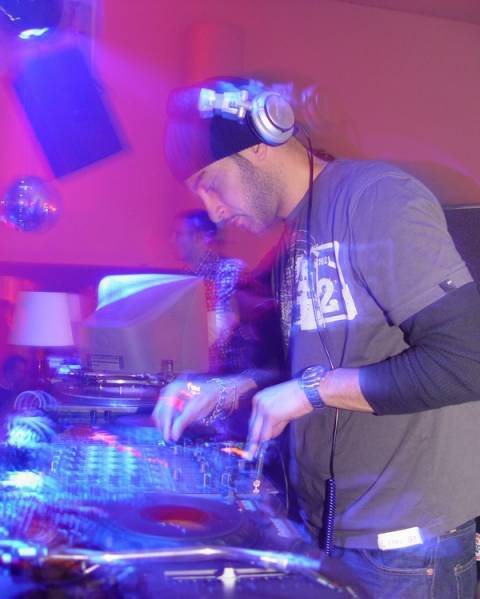
Armand van Helden reached number one on UK Dance Chart with a rerelease of his 2004 track "My My My".

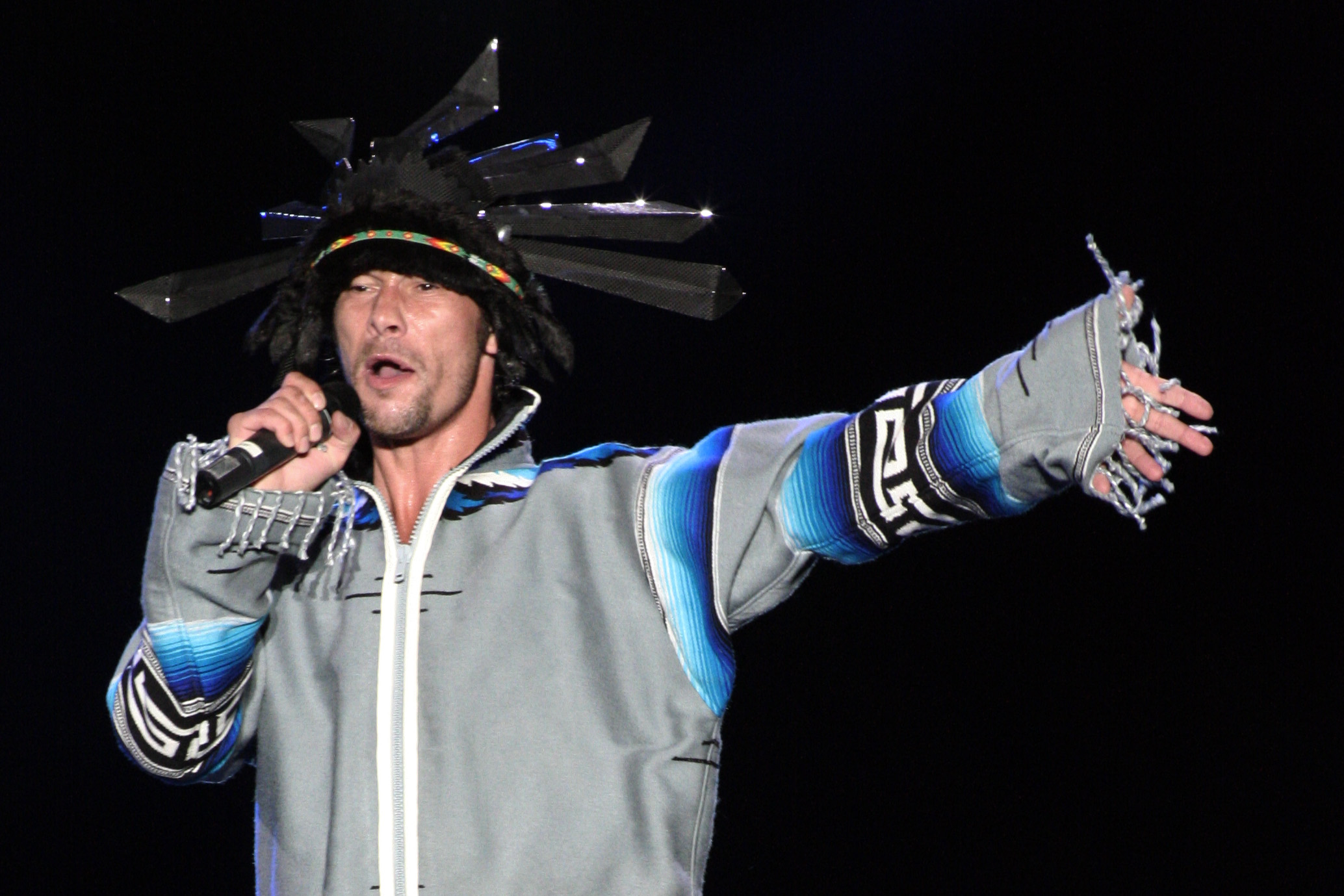
Jamiroquai topped the dance chart in June with "Space Cowboy", which was originally released in 1994.

Issue date	Song	Artist(s)	Record label	Reference
7 January	"Doctor Pressure"	Mylo vs. Miami Sound Machine	Breastfed	
14 January	"Dancin'"	Aaron Smith featuring Luvli	B.O.S.S.	
21 January	"Muscle Car"	Mylo featuring Freeform Five	Breastfed	
28 January	"Say Say Say (Waiting 4 U)"	Hi-Tack	Gusto	
4 February	"Say Say Say (Waiting 4 U)"	Hi-Tack	Gusto	
11 February	"Jealousy"	Martin Solveig	Defected	
18 February	"Jealousy"	Martin Solveig	Defected	
25 February	"The Immortal" / "Living Daylights"	DJ Fresh	Breakbeat Kaos	
4 March	"Doctor Pressure"	Mylo vs. Miami Sound Machine	Breastfed	
11 March	"Sorry"	Madonna	Warner Bros.	
18 March	"Sorry"	Madonna	Warner Bros.	
25 March	"Make a Move on Me"	Joey Negro with Taka Boom	Data	
1 April	"Make a Move on Me"	Joey Negro with Taka Boom	Data	
8 April	"Make a Move on Me"	Joey Negro with Taka Boom	Data	
15 April	"Speechless"	Mish Mash	Data	
22 April	"Never Had a Dream"	Total Science	C.I.A.	
29 April	"True Skool"	Coldcut featuring Roots Manuva	Ninja Tune	
6 May	"True Skool"	Coldcut featuring Roots Manuva	Ninja Tune	
13 May	"Somebody's Watching Me"	Beatfreakz	Data	
20 May	"Nervous"	DJ Fresh featuring Mary	Breakbeat Kaos	
27 May	"Nervous"	DJ Fresh featuring Mary	Breakbeat Kaos	
3 June	"Nervous"	DJ Fresh featuring Mary	Breakbeat Kaos	
10 June	"Space Cowboy"	Jamiroquai	Columbia	
17 June	"The Way You Love Me"	Ron Hall & The Muthafunkaz	Defected	
24 June	"My My My"	Armand Van Helden featuring Tara McDonald	Southern Fried	
1 July	"My My My"	Armand Van Helden featuring Tara McDonald	Southern Fried	
8 July	"That Old Pair of Jeans"	Fatboy Slim	Skint	
15 July	"We Are Your Friends"	Justice vs. Simian	10	
22 July	"We Are Your Friends"	Justice vs. Simian	10	
29 July	"Put Your Hands Up for Detroit"	Fedde le Grand	CR2	
5 August	"Get Together"	Madonna	Warner Bros.	
12 August	"Get Together"	Madonna	Warner Bros.	
19 August	"Take It"	Tom Novy & Lima	Data	
26 August	"Love Don't Let Me Go (Walking Away)"	David Guetta vs. The Egg	Gusto	
2 September	"Love Don't Let Me Go (Walking Away)"	David Guetta vs. The Egg	Gusto	
9 September	"Put Your Hands Up for Detroit"	Fedde le Grand	CR2	
16 September	"The Cure & the Cause"	Fish Go Deep featuring Tracey K	Defected	
23 September	"Anthem 2006"	N-Joi	RCA	
30 September	"Painkiller"	Freestylers and Pendulum with SirReal	Against the Grain	
7 October	"Changes"	Chris Lake featuring Laura V	Apollo	
14 October	"Put Your Hands Up for Detroit"	Fedde le Grand	CR2	
21 October	"Don't Stop the Music"	Bugz in the Attic	Nurture	
28 October	"Drive In Drive By"	Baron	Breakbeat Kaos	
4 November	"Put Your Hands Up for Detroit"	Fedde le Grand	Data	
11 November	"Yeah Yeah"	Bodyrox	Eye Industries/UMTV	
18 November	"Jump"	Madonna	Warner Bros.	
25 November	"Jump"	Madonna	Warner Bros.	
2 December	"Put Your Hands Up for Detroit"	Fedde le Grand	Data	
9 December	"Put Your Hands Up for Detroit"	Fedde le Grand	Data	
16 December	"Elektro"	Outwork featuring Mr Gee	Defected	
23 December	"Put Your Hands Up for Detroit"	Fedde le Grand	Data	
30 December	"Put Your Hands Up for Detroit"	Fedde le Grand	Data	

== See also ==
- List of number-one singles of 2006 (UK)
- List of UK Dance Albums Chart number ones of 2006
- List of UK Independent Singles Chart number ones of 2006
- List of UK Rock & Metal Singles Chart number ones of 2006
