= This New Day =

Studio album by Embrace
- Released: 27 March 2006
- Recorded: 2005–2006
- Studios: Britannia Row, London, England; Olympic, London, England; Blue Skies (Granada, Spain)
- Genre: Alternative rock
- Length: 49:57
- Label: Independiente
- Producer: Martin Glover

Embrace chronology
Dry Kids: B-Sides 1997–2005 (2005)	This New Day (2006)	Embrace (2014)

Singles from This New Day
- 1. "Nature's Law" Released: 20 March 2006; 2. "World at Your Feet" Released: 5 June 2006; 3. "Target" Released: 11 September 2006; 4. "I Can't Come Down" Released: 4 December 2006

This New Day is the fifth studio album by English rock band Embrace. It was released on 27 March 2006, being preceded by the release of the single, "Nature's Law", and went straight to number one on the UK Albums Chart. The single and album were enough to earn the band the distinction of performing "World at Your Feet", England's official 2006 FIFA World Cup song. The album was then reissued on 5 June 2006, with the song included on it. The album is also notable for being the first album ever to top the UK Album Downloads Chart.

"Nature's Law" had become the band's most successful single, having debuted at number two on the UK Singles Chart. Their second single was "World at Your Feet". The third single from the album was "Target" released on 11 September 2006, and charted at No. 29 after being number 9 in the midweek charts. The fourth single "I Can't Come Down" was released on 4 December 2006 and reached No. 54.

Notably, "Exploding Machines" was originally planned to be the title of the album.

== Critical reception ==
Professional ratings
Aggregate scores
Source	Rating
Metacritic	59/100
Review scores
Source	Rating
AllMusic	4/5 stars
Gigwise	1/5 stars
The Guardian	3/5 stars
The Irish Times	3/5 stars
Melodic	4/5 stars
The Observer	1/5 stars
The Skinny	1/5 stars
Stylus Magazine	A−
The Times	2/5 stars
Yahoo! Music	6/10 stars

This New Day received mixed reviews from music critics. At Metacritic, which assigns a normalized rating out of 100 to reviews from mainstream critics, the album received an average score of 59, based on nine reviews, indicating "mixed or average reviews".

== Track listing ==
All tracks are written by Embrace and Martin Glover, except where noted.

Standard edition
No.	Title	Writer(s)	Length
1.	"No Use Crying"		3:42
2.	"Nature's Law"		4:07
3.	"Target"		4:28
4.	"Sainted"		4:18
5.	"I Can't Come Down"	Danny McNamara; Richard McNamara	4:13
6.	"Celebrate"		3:33
7.	"Exploding Machines"		5:17
8.	"Even Smaller Stones"		4:28
9.	"The End Is Near"	D. McNamara; R. McNamara	4:38
10.	"This New Day"		4:45

Special edition
No.	Title	Length
1.	"No Use Crying"	3:42
2.	"Nature's Law"	4:07
3.	"Target"	4:28
4.	"World at Your Feet" (Embrace, Martin Glover and Tony Perrin)	3:39
5.	"Sainted"	4:18
6.	"I Can't Come Down" (Danny McNamara and Richard McNamara)	4:13
7.	"Celebrate"	3:33
8.	"Exploding Machines"	5:17
9.	"Even Smaller Stones"	4:28
10.	"The End Is Near" (Danny McNamara and Richard McNamara)	4:38
11.	"This New Day"	4:45

== Release history ==
Country	Date	Label	Format
United Kingdom	27 March 2006	Independiente	LP, CD

== Charts and certifications ==
=== Weekly charts ===
Chart performance for This New Day
Chart (2006)	Peak position
Scottish Albums (Official Charts)	1
UK Albums (Official Charts)	1
UK Independent Albums (Official Charts)	1
UK Album Downloads (Official Charts)	1

=== Year-end charts ===
Chart (2006)	Position
UK Albums (OCC)	92

=== Certifications ===
Region	Certification	Certified units/sales
United Kingdom (BPI)	Gold	100,000^{^}
^{^} Shipments figures based on certification alone.
