= Target (Embrace song) =

Single by Embrace

from the album This New Day
- Released: 11 September 2006
- Recorded: Granada, Spain
- Genre: Alternative rock
- Length: 4:28
- Label: Independiente
- Songwriter(s): Martin Glover, Richard McNamara and Danny McNamara
- Producer(s): Youth, Embrace

Embrace singles chronology
"World at Your Feet" (2006)	"Target" (2006)	"I Can't Come Down" (2006)

"Target" is a song by English rock band Embrace and is featured on their number-one charting fifth album, This New Day. It was released on 11 September 2006 as the follow-up to the band's official World Cup 2006 Anthem. It did not repeat the top 3 success of their two recent singles from their album, peaking at #29 in the UK Singles Chart and was their last song to reach the UK top 40.

== Track listing ==
7" ISOM110SST

1. "Target"
2. "Just Admit It"

CD1 ISOM110MSST

1. "Target"
2. "Run Away"

CD2 ISOM110SMSST

1. "Target"
2. "One Luck"
3. "Thank God You Were Mean To Me"

== Charts ==
"Target" spent 2 weeks in the UK Singles Chart in September 2006, peaking at number 29. The single was a number one hit in the UK independent singles chart.
