= Nature's Law =

2006 single by Embrace

Single by Embrace

from the album This New Day
- B-side: "Deliver Me"; "Collide"; "Soulmates"
- Released: 20 March 2006
- Length: 4:07
- Label: Independiente
- Songwriters: Martin "Youth" Glover; Embrace
- Producer: Martin "Youth" Glover

Embrace singles chronology
"A Glorious Day" (2005)	"Nature's Law" (2006)	"World at Your Feet" (2006)

"Nature's Law" is a song by English rock band Embrace from their fifth studio album, This New Day (2006). It was released 20 March 2006 as the lead single from the album, peaking at number two on the UK Singles Chart to become the band's highest-charting single in their home country.

== Track listings ==
UK CD single

1. "Nature's Law" – 4:09
2. "Deliver Me" – 3:52
3. "Collide" – 2:57

UK DVD single

1. "Nature's Law" (audio)
2. "Nature's Law" (video)
3. "Nature's Law" (video—live at the M.E.N. Arena)
4. "Nature's Law" (video—behind the scenes)

UK limited-edition 7-inch orange vinyl single

A. "Nature's Law" – 4:09
B. "Soulmates" – 4:11

UK digital download

1. "Nature's Law" – 4:07
2. "Deliver Me" – 3:54
3. "Collide" – 2:59
4. "Nature's Law" (draft one) – 4:15
5. "Nature's Law" (live at Alexandra Palace) – 4:10
6. "Nature's Law" (live at the M.E.N. Arena) – 4:12
7. "Nature's Law" (orchestral instrumental version) – 4:06
8. "Nature's Law" (orchestral version) – 4:11

== Charts ==
=== Weekly charts ===
Chart (2006)	Peak position
Europe (Eurochart Hot 100)	10
Scotland Singles (OCC)	1
UK Singles (OCC)	2
UK Airplay (Music Week)	2
UK Indie (OCC)	1

=== Year-end charts ===
Chart (2006)	Position
UK Singles (OCC)	81
UK Airplay (Music Week)	67
