= World at Your Feet =

2006 song by English rock band Embrace

Single by Embrace

from the album This New Day
- Released: 5 June 2006
- Recorded: 2006
- Length: 3:39
- Label: Independiente
- Songwriter(s): Richard McNamara, Danny McNamara, Martin Glover, Tony Perrin
- Producer(s): Youth, Embrace

Embrace singles chronology
"Nature's Law" (2006)	"World at Your Feet" (2006)	"Target" (2006)

"World at Your Feet" is a song by English rock band Embrace from the re-released version of their fifth studio album, This New Day (2006). It was the official song of the England World Cup squad in the 2006 FIFA World Cup campaign, and was released on 5 June 2006. Singer Danny McNamara told the NME: "We didn't apply to do this. They just asked us. Our manager said, 'Do you want to do the World Cup song? The FA want to know.' I asked my dad and he said, 'if you think you're up to it-do it!' I was just trying to cover all the bases."

It was broadcast on Radio 1 on 21 April by Chris Moyles. A news reporter on BBC One was in a Bristol pub at the time and had several people listen and review the song. The first impressions were that the song is "too slow". This caused Moyles and a good friend of members of the band to shout out on the radio, live, "It's not too slow, it's perfect. Shut up and enjoy it."

== Track listings ==
7-inch (ISOM107S)

1. "World at Your Feet"
2. "What Lies Behind Us"

CD1 (ISOM107MS)

1. "World at Your Feet"
2. "Celebrate"

CD2 (ISOM107SMS)

1. "World at Your Feet" – 3:41
2. "Love Order" – 4:39
3. "Whatever It Takes" – 7:21

== Chart performance ==
As the follow-up to their previous single, the number-two hit "Nature's Law", "World at Your Feet" became another commercial success for Embrace, marking their second UK top-three single by peaking at number three on the UK Singles Chart.

=== Weekly charts ===
Chart (2006)	Peak position
Europe (Eurochart Hot 100)	10
Scotland (OCC)	9
UK Singles (OCC)	3
UK Indie (OCC)	1

=== Year-end charts ===
Chart (2006)	Position
UK Singles (OCC)	131
