= List of UK Rock & Metal Albums Chart number ones of 2006 =

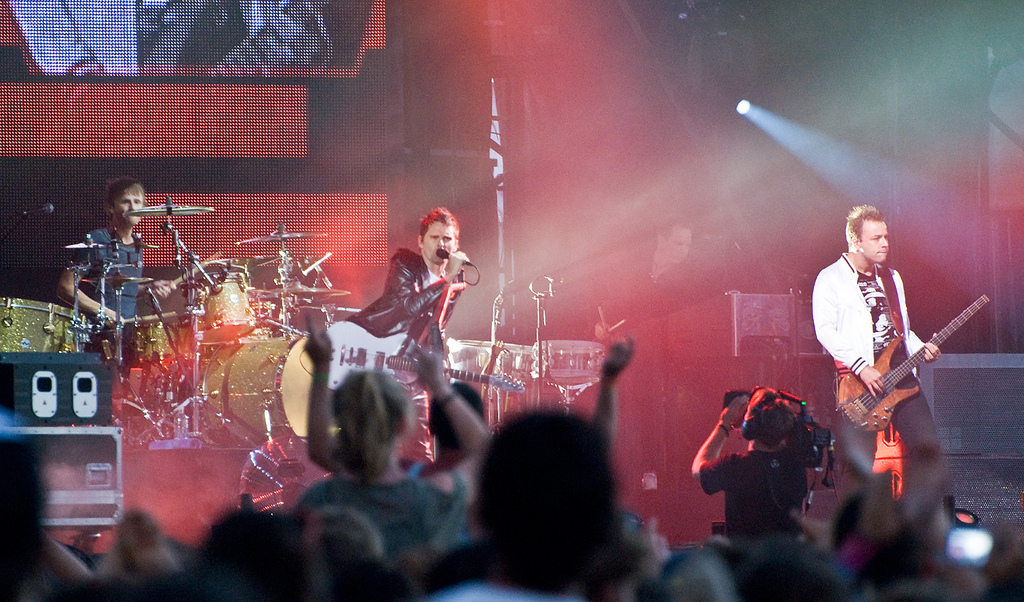
Muse's 2006 fourth studio album Black Holes and Revelations was the longest-running number-one album of 2006, spending ten weeks atop the chart.

The UK Rock & Metal Albums Chart is a record chart which ranks the best-selling rock and heavy metal albums in the United Kingdom. Compiled and published by the Official Charts Company, the data is based on each album's weekly physical sales, digital downloads and streams. In 2006, there were 21 albums that topped the 52 published charts. The first number-one album of the year was In Your Honor, the fifth studio album by Foo Fighters, which was released the previous year and spent the first four weeks of 2006 at number one. The first new number-one album of the year was Yellowcard's fifth studio album Lights and Sounds. The final number-one album of the year was the Aerosmith compilation The Very Best of Aerosmith, which spent the last two weeks of the year at number one.

The most successful album on the UK Rock & Metal Albums Chart in 2006 was Muse's 2006 fourth studio album Black Holes and Revelations, which spent a total of ten weeks at number one over four separate spells. Green Day's 2004 seventh studio album American Idiot was number one for eight weeks in 2006, while Stadium Arcadium by Red Hot Chili Peppers spent seven weeks at number one and was the best-selling rock and metal album of the year, ranking 15th in the UK End of Year Albums Chart. In Your Honor by Foo Fighters and The Black Parade by My Chemical Romance were both number one on the chart for four consecutive weeks, while an additional three albums – Yellowcard's Lights and Sounds, Evanescence's The Open Door and The Very Best of Aerosmith – each spent two weeks at number one in 2006.

== Chart history ==
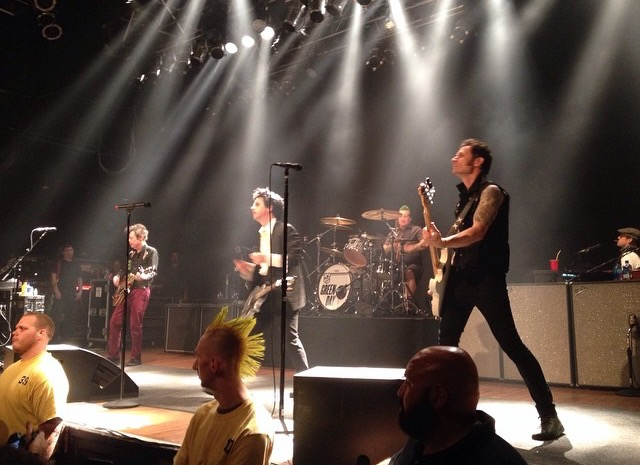
Green Day's 2004 release American Idiot was number one for eight weeks across three spells in 2006.

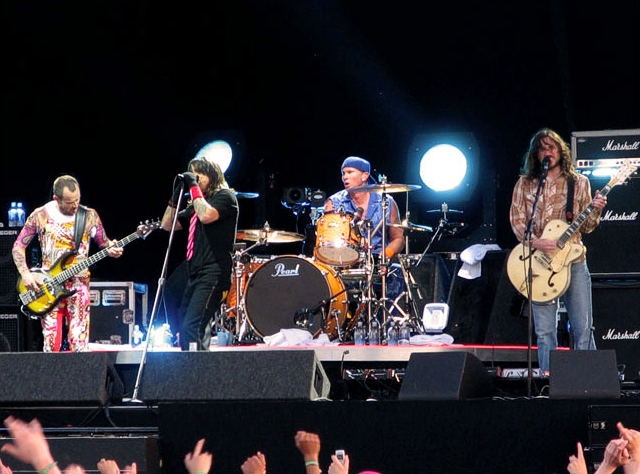
Stadium Arcadium by Red Hot Chili Peppers spent seven weeks at number one in 2006, and was the best-selling rock and metal album of the year.

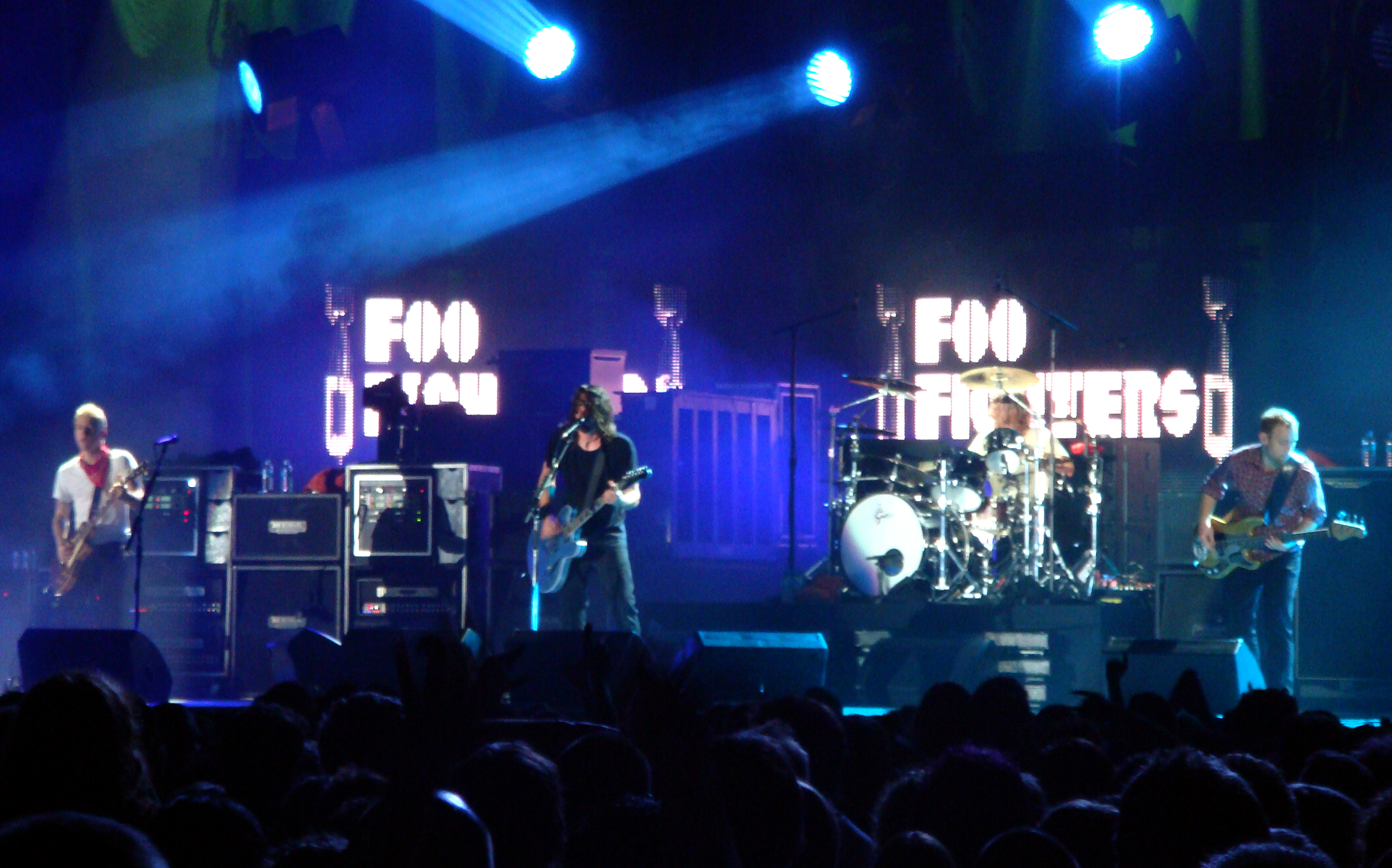
Foo Fighters spent six weeks at number one in 2006, five of which were held by In Your Honor.

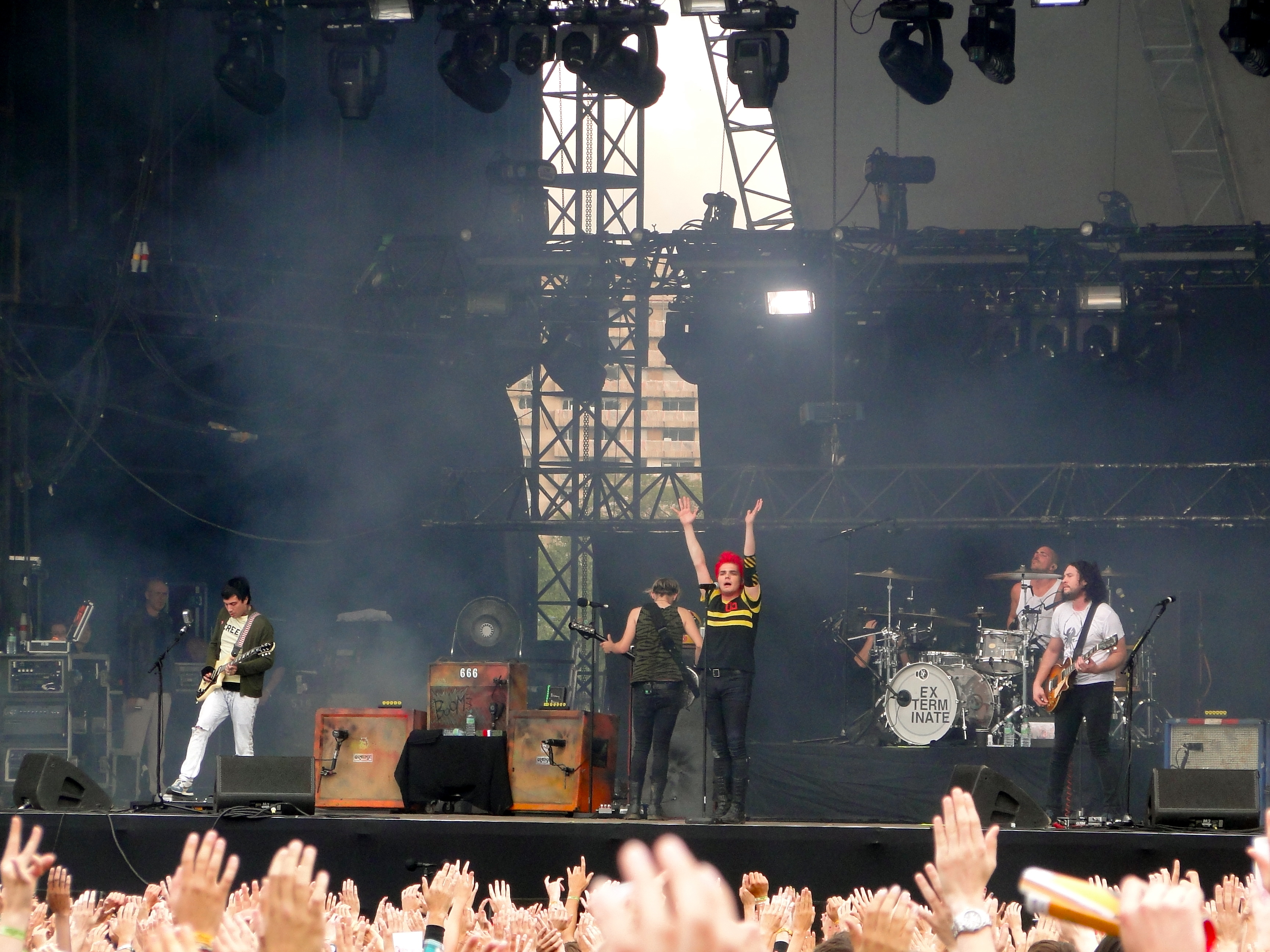
Two albums by My Chemical Romance reached number one in 2006: Life on the Murder Scene (one week) and The Black Parade (four weeks).

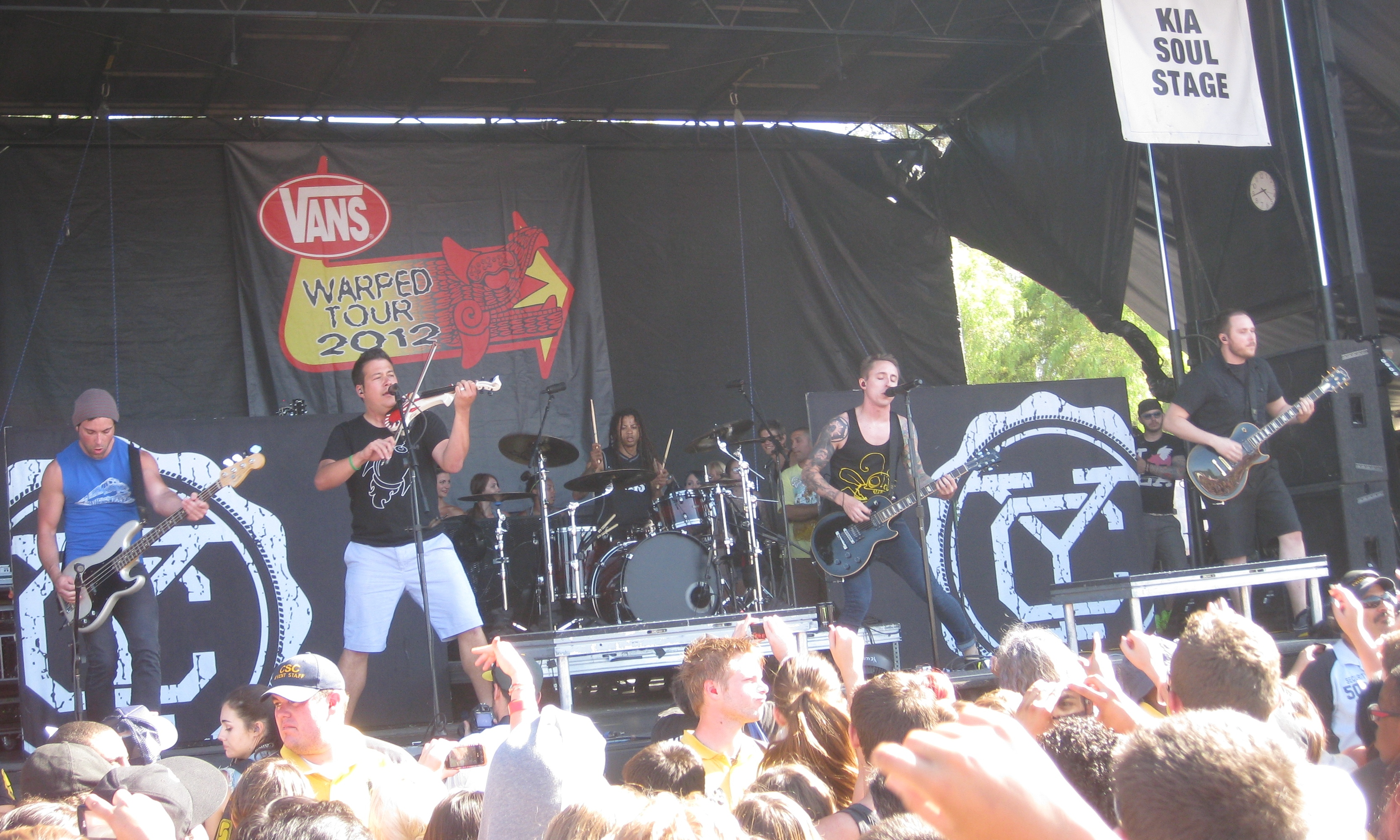
Yellowcard's Lights and Sounds spent two weeks at number one in 2006.

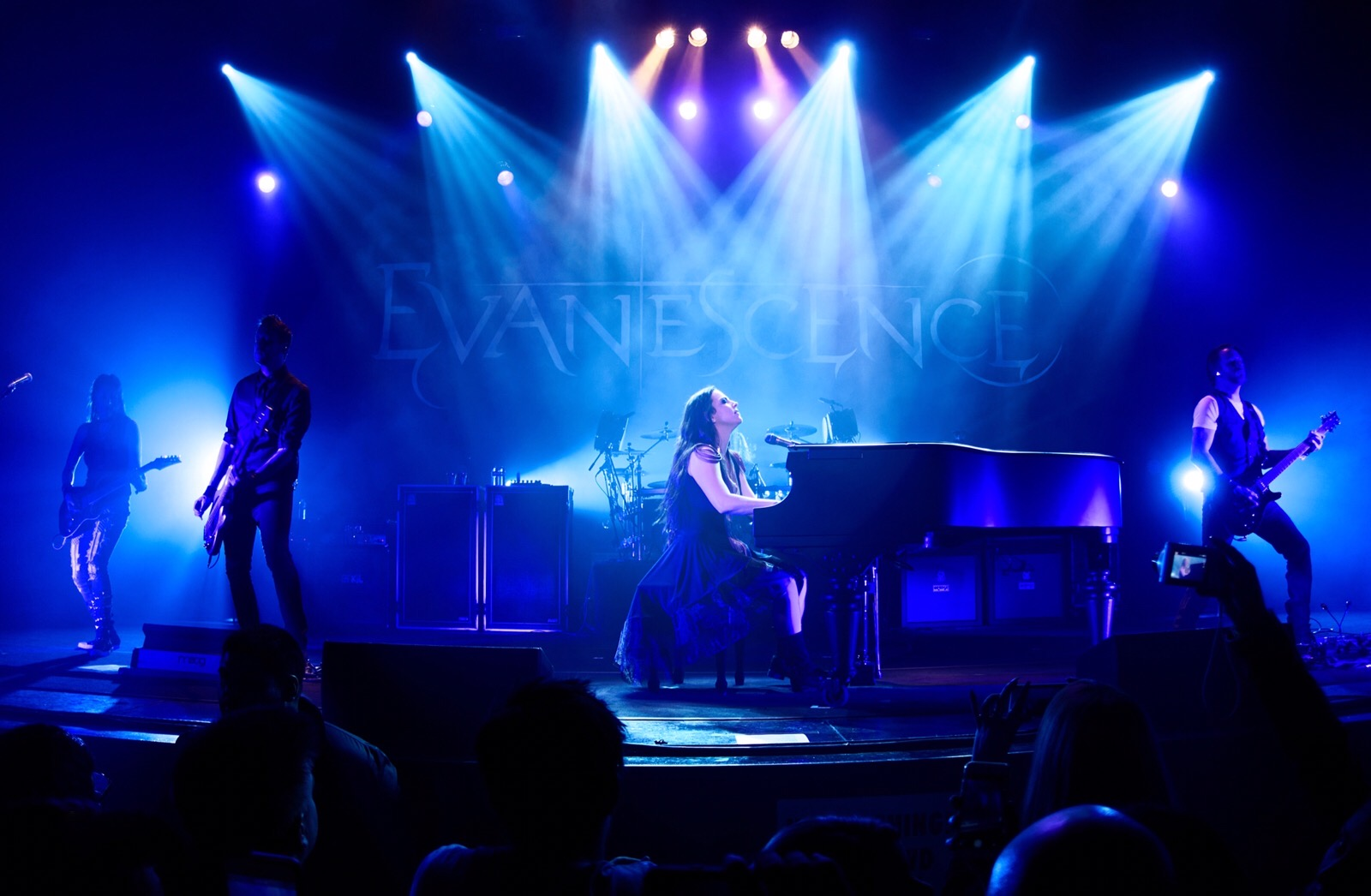
The Open Door by Evanescence was number one for two weeks in 2006.

Key
†	Indicates best-selling rock album of 2006

Issue date	Album	Artist(s)	Record label(s)	Ref.
7 January	In Your Honor	Foo Fighters	RCA	
14 January	In Your Honor	Foo Fighters	RCA	
21 January	In Your Honor	Foo Fighters	RCA	
28 January	In Your Honor	Foo Fighters	RCA	
4 February	Lights and Sounds	Yellowcard	Capitol	
11 February	Lights and Sounds	Yellowcard	Capitol	
18 February	Curious George Original Soundtrack	Jack Johnson	Brushfire/Island	
25 February	American Idiot	Green Day	Reprise	
4 March	American Idiot	Green Day	Reprise	
11 March	Ascendancy	Trivium	Roadrunner	
18 March	American Idiot	Green Day	Reprise	
25 March	American Idiot	Green Day	Reprise	
1 April	Life on the Murder Scene	My Chemical Romance	Reprise	
8 April	American Idiot	Green Day	Reprise	
15 April	American Idiot	Green Day	Reprise	
22 April	American Idiot	Green Day	Reprise	
29 April	American Idiot	Green Day	Reprise	
6 May	Louder Now	Taking Back Sunday	Warner Bros.	
13 May	10,000 Days	Tool	Tool Dissectional	
20 May	Stadium Arcadium †	Red Hot Chili Peppers	Warner Bros.	
27 May	Stadium Arcadium †	Red Hot Chili Peppers	Warner Bros.	
3 June	Stadium Arcadium †	Red Hot Chili Peppers	Warner Bros.	
10 June	Stadium Arcadium †	Red Hot Chili Peppers	Warner Bros.	
17 June	Stadium Arcadium †	Red Hot Chili Peppers	Warner Bros.	
24 June	Stadium Arcadium †	Red Hot Chili Peppers	Warner Bros.	
1 July	Stadium Arcadium †	Red Hot Chili Peppers	Warner Bros.	
8 July	Liberation Transmission	Lostprophets	Visible Noise	
15 July	Black Holes and Revelations	Muse	Helium 3/Warner Bros.	
22 July	Black Holes and Revelations	Muse	Helium 3/Warner Bros.	
29 July	Black Holes and Revelations	Muse	Helium 3/Warner Bros.	
5 August	Black Holes and Revelations	Muse	Helium 3/Warner Bros.	
12 August	Come What(ever) May	Stone Sour	Roadrunner	
19 August	Black Holes and Revelations	Muse	Helium 3/Warner Bros.	
26 August	Black Holes and Revelations	Muse	Helium 3/Warner Bros.	
2 September	Christ Illusion	Slayer	Warner Bros.	
9 September	A Matter of Life and Death	Iron Maiden	EMI	
16 September	Revelations	Audioslave	Epic/Interscope	
23 September	Black Holes and Revelations	Muse	Helium 3/Warner Bros.	
30 September	Black Holes and Revelations	Muse	Helium 3/Warner Bros.	
7 October	Black Holes and Revelations	Muse	Helium 3/Warner Bros.	
14 October	The Open Door	Evanescence	Wind-up	
21 October	The Crusade	Trivium	Roadrunner	
28 October	The Open Door	Evanescence	Wind-up	
4 November	The Black Parade	My Chemical Romance	Warner Bros.	
11 November	The Black Parade	My Chemical Romance	Warner Bros.	
18 November	The Black Parade	My Chemical Romance	Warner Bros.	
25 November	The Black Parade	My Chemical Romance	Warner Bros.	
2 December	Skin and Bones	Foo Fighters	RCA	
9 December	Light Grenades	Incubus	Epic/Immortal	
16 December	Black Holes and Revelations	Muse	Helium 3/Warner Bros.	
23 December	The Very Best of Aerosmith	Aerosmith	Columbia/Geffen	
30 December	The Very Best of Aerosmith	Aerosmith	Columbia/Geffen	

== See also ==
- 2006 in British music
- List of UK Rock & Metal Singles Chart number ones of 2006
