= Fred Everything =

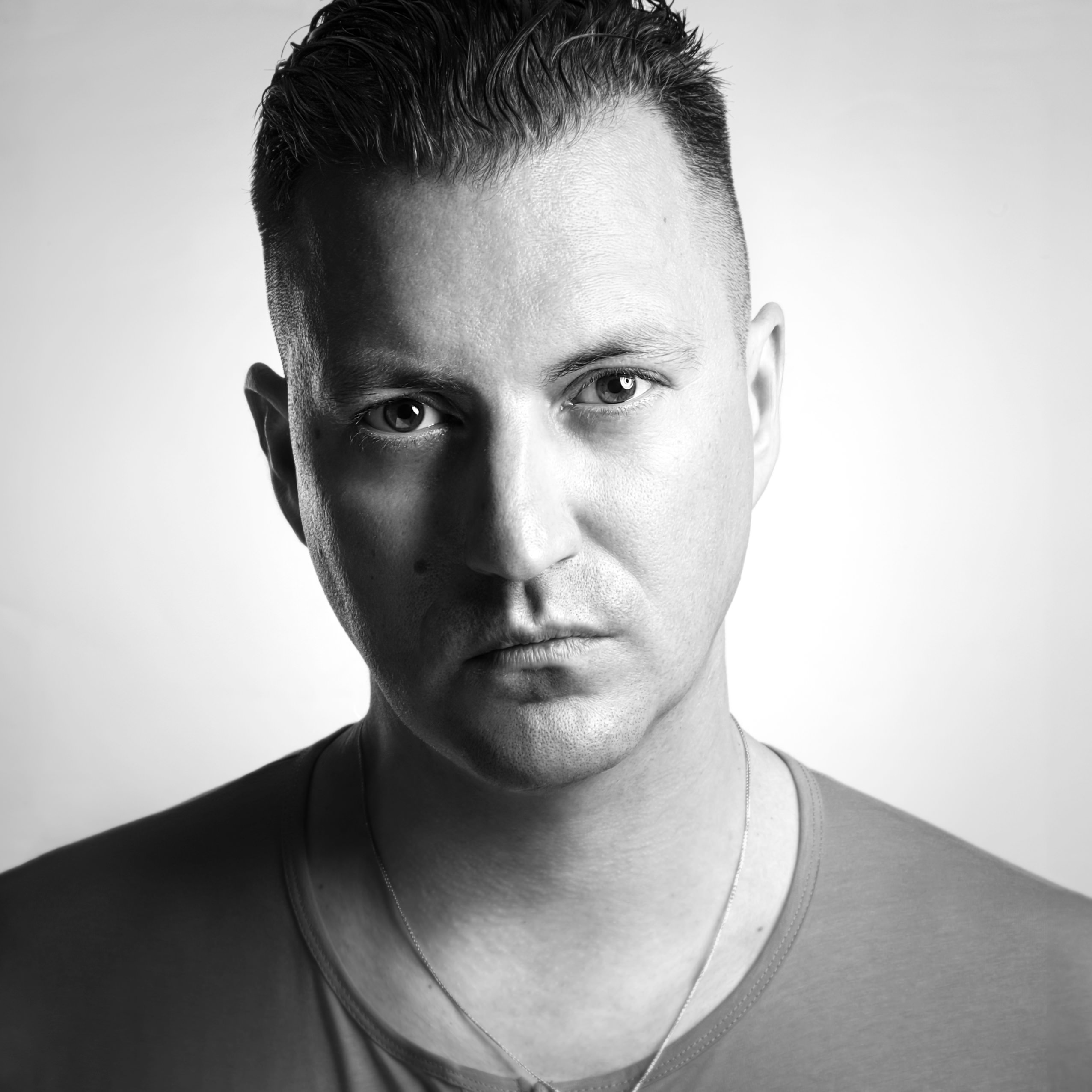
- Fred Everything in 2015

Background information
- Also known as: The Afro Love Project; Frederico Todos
- Born: Frédéric Blais; Hull, Quebec, Canada
- Origin: Montreal, Quebec, Canada
- Genres: House; Deep house
- Occupations: DJ, music producer, composer, remixer
- Years active: 1993 – present
- Label: 20:20 Vision

Fred Everything (born Frédéric Blais in Hull, Quebec) is a French-Canadian electronic musician and DJ, best known for his work in the deep house music genre.

== Early life ==
Blais was brought up in Quebec City, where he gained an interest in synthesis and editing techniques from a young age. He later went on to perform in several live bands and compose music for theatre. His interest in dance music began with the acid house movement, particularly UK label Warp Records' releases.

== Career ==
In the early 90s, he started performing live in raves and clubs in Canada. He was then known as "Everything", because his live sets could range anywhere from techno to house, ambient, and drum and bass. Fred Everything's career as a DJ began in 1993, when he opened for Sasha at the Metropolis club night in Montreal. After building up a reputation in the US and Canada, he moved to Montreal in 1996, where he released many records under various record labels, including 20:20 Vision, with whom he went on to release a total of 20 records, including Under the Sun in 2000.

Fred Everything became popular in Europe in 1997 when he performed at a festival in Glasgow, Scotland. Two years later, he moved to London for three months to do an extended European tour whilst also doing production work with numerous other deep house artists, including AtJazz, Nigel Hayes, and Bougie Soliterre.

Towards the end of the 1990s, a remix of Derrick Carter's "Life Is Like A Circle", as well as the release of Under the Sun gave Fred Everything more popularity as a remixer. He went on to remix a large number of tracks, the most well known of these being his remix of Bran Van 3000 and Roy Davis Jr.'s track "Watch Them Come". This led to a compilation of his remixes, From The Deep- A Collection of Remixes 1998-2001, being released by Bombay Records in 2002. Everything also writes articles on house music for the San Francisco-based music journal XLR8R. He also won two awards at the Mimi Gala that year, which voted him "Best DJ in Montreal" and "Best Electronic Artist".
