= List of UK R&B Albums Chart number ones of 2006 =

The logo of the Official Charts Company, responsible for compiling all of the official music charts in the United Kingdom, including the R&B albums chart.

The UK R&B Chart is a weekly chart, first introduced in October 1994, that ranks the 40 biggest-selling singles and albums that are classified in the R&B genre in the United Kingdom. The chart is compiled by the Official Charts Company, and is based on sales of CDs, downloads, vinyl and other formats over the previous seven days.

The following are the number-one albums of 2006.

== Number-one albums ==
Issue date	Album	Artist(s)	Record label	Ref.
1 January	Curtain Call: The Hits	Eminem	Shady/Aftermath/Interscope	
8 January	Curtain Call: The Hits	Eminem	Shady/Aftermath/Interscope	
15 January	Duets: The Final Chapter	The Notorious B.I.G.	Bad Boy	
22 January	Duets: The Final Chapter	The Notorious B.I.G.	Bad Boy	
29 January	Duets: The Final Chapter	The Notorious B.I.G.	Bad Boy	
5 February	Duets: The Final Chapter	The Notorious B.I.G.	Bad Boy	
12 February	R&B Lovesongs	Various Artists	Sony BMG/Universal Music TV	
19 February	R&B Lovesongs	Various Artists	Sony BMG/Universal Music TV	
26 February	Late Registration	Kanye West	Roc-A-Fella/Def Jam	
5 March	Corinne Bailey Rae	Corinne Bailey Rae	EMI	
12 March	Corinne Bailey Rae	Corinne Bailey Rae	EMI	
19 March	Corinne Bailey Rae	Corinne Bailey Rae	EMI	
26 March	Corinne Bailey Rae	Corinne Bailey Rae	EMI	
2 April	Corinne Bailey Rae	Corinne Bailey Rae	EMI	
9 April	Corinne Bailey Rae	Corinne Bailey Rae	EMI	
16 April	The Hardest Way to Make an Easy Living	The Streets	679/Locked On	
23 April	The Hardest Way to Make an Easy Living	The Streets	679/Locked On	
30 April	St. Elsewhere	Gnarls Barkley	Downtown/Atlantic	
7 May	St. Elsewhere	Gnarls Barkley	Downtown/Atlantic	
14 May	St. Elsewhere	Gnarls Barkley	Downtown/Atlantic	
21 May	St. Elsewhere	Gnarls Barkley	Downtown/Atlantic	
28 May	St. Elsewhere	Gnarls Barkley	Downtown/Atlantic	
4 June	St. Elsewhere	Gnarls Barkley	Downtown/Atlantic	
11 June	Essential R&B - Summer 2006	Various Artists	Sony BMG/Universal Music TV	
18 June	The Big Bang	Busta Rhymes	Flipmode/Aftermath/Interscope	
25 June	The Big Bang	Busta Rhymes	Flipmode/Aftermath/Interscope	
2 July	PCD	The Pussycat Dolls	A&M/Interscope	
9 July	PCD	The Pussycat Dolls	A&M/Interscope	
16 July	PCD	The Pussycat Dolls	A&M/Interscope	
23 July	PCD	The Pussycat Dolls	A&M/Interscope	
30 July	In My Mind	Pharrell Williams	Star Trak/Interscope	
6 August	A Girl Like Me	Rihanna	Def Jam/SRP	
13 August	A Girl Like Me	Rihanna	Def Jam/SRP	
20 August	Back to Basics	Christina Aguilera	RCA	
27 August	Back to Basics	Christina Aguilera	RCA	
3 September	Back to Basics	Christina Aguilera	RCA	
10 September	B'Day	Beyoncé	Columbia/Music World	
17 September	FutureSex/LoveSounds	Justin Timberlake	Jive/Zomba	
24 September	FutureSex/LoveSounds	Justin Timberlake	Jive/Zomba	
1 October	FutureSex/LoveSounds	Justin Timberlake	Jive/Zomba	
8 October	FutureSex/LoveSounds	Justin Timberlake	Jive/Zomba	
15 October	Corinne Bailey Rae	Corinne Bailey Rae	EMI	
22 October	Press Play	Diddy	Bad Boy/Atlantic	
29 October	Once Again	John Legend	GOOD Music	
5 November	Back to Black	Amy Winehouse	Island	
12 November	High Times: Singles 1992–2006	Jamiroquai	Sony	
19 November	High Times: Singles 1992–2006	Jamiroquai	Sony	
26 November	High Times: Singles 1992–2006	Jamiroquai	Sony	
3 December	High Times: Singles 1992–2006	Jamiroquai	Sony	
10 December	Eminem Presents: The Re-Up	Various Artists	Shady/Interscope	
17 December	High Times: Singles 1992–2006	Jamiroquai	Sony	
24 December	High Times: Singles 1992–2006	Jamiroquai	Sony	
31 December	Back to Black	Amy Winehouse	Island	

== See also ==
- List of UK Albums Chart number ones of the 2010s
