= Fireworks: The Singles 1997–2002 =

Greatest hits album by Embrace
- Released: 25 March 2002
- Recorded: 1997–2002
- Genre: Alternative rock
- Length: 58:10
- Label: Hut/Virgin

Embrace chronology
| If You've Never Been (2001) | Fireworks: The Singles 1997–2002 (2002) | Out of Nothing (2004) |

Professional ratings
Review scores
| Source | Rating |
|---|---|
| AllMusic | 4/5 stars |
| NME | 4/5 stars |

Fireworks: The Singles 1997–2002 is a compilation album of singles from English band Embrace's first 3 albums.

The versions of "Make It Last" and "I Wouldn't Wanna Happen to You" are both the single versions and are different from those on the albums If You've Never Been and Drawn from Memory. It also features a (re-recorded) cover of Bob Dorrough's "3 Is A Magic Number", which was originally a B-side to "I Wouldn't Wanna Happen to You". "The Good Will Out", which is usually their encore at live performances, was released only on 12" as a limited edition.

The album reached No. 36, at a time in which the band's popularity was waning and record-label Hut had dropped them. The main intention of the album's release was that their record label had insisted they complete their four-album deal.

== Track listings ==
=== CD ===
1. "All You Good Good People"
2. "You're Not Alone"
3. "Come Back to What You Know"
4. "Make It Last" (single version)
5. "3 Is A Magic Number"
6. "One Big Family"
7. "My Weakness Is None of Your Business"
8. "I Wouldn't Wanna Happen to You" (single version)
9. "Save Me" (edit)
10. "Hooligan"
11. "The Good Will Out"
12. "Wonder"
13. "Fireworks"

=== DVD ===
1. "All You Good Good People" (Fierce Panda version)
2. "The Last Gas"
3. "One Big Family"
4. "All You Good Good People"
5. "Come Back to What You Know"
6. "My Weakness Is None of Your Business"
7. "Hooligan"
8. "You're Not Alone"
9. "Save Me"
10. "I Wouldn't Wanna Happen to You"
11. "Wonder"
12. "Make It Last"
13. "Higher Sights (live)"
14. "All You Good Good People" (US version)
