= He Never Mentioned Love =

Studio album by Claire Martin
- Released: June 4, 2007
- Recorded: December 2–4, 2006
- Genre: Vocal jazz
- Length: 32:18
- Label: Linn

Claire Martin chronology
When Lights Are Low (2005)	He Never Mentioned Love (2007)

Professional ratings
Review scores
Source	Rating
The Guardian	4/5 stars
The Penguin Guide to Jazz Recordings	4/4 stars

He Never Mentioned Love is an album by Claire Martin, released in 2007.

== Critical reception ==
The Guardian wrote: "Having covered a lot of ground on her previous albums without demonstrating a convincing emotional range, here she ticks that final box and becomes the complete jazz singer she's always threatened to be."

== Track listing ==
1. "He Never Mentioned Love" (Curtis Reginald Lewis) – 5:08
2. "Forget Me" (Valerie Brown Parks) – 3:59
3. "Everything Must Change" (Benard Ighner) – 5:18
4. "Trav'llin Light" (Johnny Mercer, Jimmy Mundy, Trummy Young) – 2:44
5. "The Music That Makes Me Dance" (Bob Merrill, Jule Styne) – 6:11
6. "All Night Long" (Curtis) – 3:41
7. "If You Go" (Geoffrey Claremont Parsons, Michel Emer) – 4:57
8. "A Song for You" (Leon Russell) – 4:59
9. "Slowly But Shirley" (Laurence Cottle, Claire Martin) – 4:07
10. "You're Nearer" (Lorenz Hart, Richard Rodgers) – 4:39
11. "L.A. Breakdown" (Larry B. Marks) – 5:23
12. "Slow Time" (Ian Shaw) – 4:09
13. "The Sun Died" (Ray Charles, Hubert Giraud, Anne Gregory, Pierre LeRoye) – 5:26

== Personnel ==
- Claire Martin – vocal
- Gareth Williams – piano
- Laurence Cottle – bass, producer
- Clark Tracey – drums
