= The Abbey Road Sessions =

Abbey Road sessions or The Abbey Road Sessions may refer to:

- Abbey Road Sessions, a 1997 live solo album by Mike Peters
- Abbey Road Sessions, music recording sessions conducted at Abbey Road Studios
- The Abbey Road Sessions (DVD), a 2006 live DVD by Donavon Frankenreiter
- The Abbey Road Sessions (EP), a 1999 EP by Embrace
- The Abbey Road Sessions (Kylie Minogue album), 2012
- The Abbey Road Sessions (Ian Shaw album), 2011
- The Abbey Road Sessions/The Walk, a 2005 album by Steven Curtis Chapman

== See also ==
- Abbey Road (disambiguation)
