= Lifejacket (disambiguation) =

A lifejacket is a marine safety flotation device.

Lifejacket may also refer to:

- Lifejacket (album) by Ian Shaw
- Lifejackets (album) by Danish-based indie rock band Mimas.
