= Taking It to Hart =

Taking it to Hart

Studio album by Ian Shaw
- Released: 1996
- Recorded: 1996
- Genre: Vocal jazz
- Length: 52:48
- Label: Jazz House Records

Ian Shaw chronology
Ghostsongs (1996)	Taking it to Hart (1996)	The Echo of a Song (1997)

Taking it to Hart is a 1996 studio album by Ian Shaw, focusing on the songs written by Richard Rodgers and Lorenz Hart.

== Critical reception ==
Professional ratings
Review scores
Source	Rating
The Penguin Guide to Jazz Recordings	2.5/4 stars

Dave Burns of JazzTimes said that Shaw "is blessed with strong pipes and good intonation; unfortunately, he has also mastered every pop mannerism-bathos, exaggerated dynamics, melodramatic vibrato, fake-Southern diction, swoops of pointless-tasteless Mathis falsetto, the Tom Jones vocal wink, the ain't-we-hip scat", but added that the musicians and arrangements added a "tender counterpoint".

== Track listing ==
1. "I Wish I Were in Love Again" – 2:58
2. "Where or When" – 3:24
3. "Have You Met Miss Jones?" – 4:11
4. "I Could Write a Book" – 4:00
5. "My Romance"/"Any Old Place with You" – 3:10
6. "Little Girl Blue" – 4:01
7. "I Didn't Know What Time It Was" – 6:07
8. "My Funny Valentine" – 5:12
9. "Blue Moon" – 1:55
10. "This Can't Be Love" – 3:00
11. "It Never Entered My Mind" – 5:12
12. "This Funny World" – 3:51
13. "With a Song in My Heart" – 5:47

All music composed by Richard Rodgers, with all lyrics written by Lorenz Hart.

== Personnel ==
- Ian Shaw - vocals, arranger
- Carol Grimes - vocals
- Mari Wilson - vocals
- Iain Ballamy - tenor saxophone
- Mornington Lockett - tenor saxophone
- Guy Barker - trumpet
- Tim Wells - double bass
- Matthew Barley - cello
- Mark Fletcher - drums
- Adrian York - piano
