= Soho Stories =

Studio album by Ian Shaw
- Released: 23 March 2001
- Recorded: September 2000
- Genre: Vocal jazz
- Label: Milestone
- Producer: Todd Barkan

Ian Shaw chronology
In a New York Minute (1999)	Soho Stories (2001)	A World Still Turning (2003)

Professional ratings
Review scores
Source	Rating
Allmusic	4.5/5 stars
The Penguin Guide to Jazz Recordings	3/4 stars

Soho Stories is a 2001 studio album by Welsh jazz singer Ian Shaw.

== Track listing ==
1. "Comes Love" (Lew Brown, Sam H. Stept, Charles Tobias) – 4:02
2. "I Never Went Away" (Richard Rodney Bennett) – 4:13
3. "Ruby" (Janis Ian) – 5:22
4. "Dearly Beloved" (Jerome Kern, Johnny Mercer) – 3:32
5. "How Little We Know" (Hoagy Carmichael, Mercer) – 4:23
6. "A Little Piece of Heaven" (Rob Coral, Sue Hawker) – 2:15
7. "I Wished on the Moon" (Dorothy Parker, Ralph Rainger) – 3:55
8. "Be Sure I'll Let You Know" (Ian Shaw, Cedar Walton) – 4:28
9. "If You Could See Me Now" (Tadd Dameron, Carl Sigman) – 4:03
10. "Tomorrow Never Came" (Fran Landesman, Simon Wallace) – 5:12
11. "I Keep Going Back to Joe's" (Marvin Fisher, Jack Segal) – 4:25
12. "Happy with the Blues" (Harold Arlen, Peggy Lee) – 2:30
13. "Rainbow Sleeves" (Tom Waits) – 3:37

== Personnel ==
- Ian Shaw – vocals, piano, arranger
- Papo Vazquez – trombone
- Lew Soloff – trumpet
- Mark Fletcher – drums
- Chip Jackson – double bass
- Joe Beck – guitar
- Cedar Walton – piano
- James Pearson – piano, arranger
- Eric Alexander – tenor saxophone
- Steve Rubie – flute
- Geoff Gascoyne – arranger
- Simon Wallace

Production

- Jamie Putnam – art direction, design
- Katherine Miller – engineer, mixing
- Darren Crowdy – executive producer
- Joel E. Siegel – liner notes
- George Horn – mastering
- Michael Semanick – mixing
- John Abbott – photography
