= When Lights Are Low =

When Lights Are Low may refer to:

- "When Lights Are Low", a song composed by Benny Carter and Spencer Williams, 1936
- When Lights Are Low (Tony Bennett album), 1964
- When Lights Are Low, an album by Harry Edison, 1966
- When Lights Are Low (Kenny Burrell album), 1979
- When Lights Are Low (Claire Martin and Richard Rodney Bennett album), 2005
