= Stairway to the Stars =

1939 popular song by Malneck, Signorelli, and Parish

Song
- Released: 1939 by Robbins Music Corp.
- Songwriters: Matty Malneck, Frank Signorelli, Mitchell Parish

"Stairway to the Stars" is a popular song composed by Matty Malneck and Frank Signorelli, with lyrics by Mitchell Parish. It was based on a theme from Malneck and Signorelli's 1934 instrumental piece, "Park Avenue Fantasy."

Hit recordings in 1939 were by Glenn Miller, Kay Kyser, Jimmy Dorsey and by Al Donohue. The Glenn Miller recording on RCA Bluebird reached no. 1 on the Your Hit Parade chart.

== Notable recordings ==
- Glenn Miller and His Orchestra, vocals by Ray Eberle (May 9, 1939)
- Ella Fitzgerald and her Famous Orchestra (June 29, 1939)
- The Ink Spots – 1939 NBC radio Broadcast (July 12, 1939)
- Jimmy Dorsey and his Orchestra, vocals by Bob Eberly (1939)
- Kay Kyser and his Orchestra, vocals by Harry Babbitt (1939)
- Al Donahue and his Orchestra, vocals by Paula Kelly (1939)
- Dinah Washington with Chubby Jackson's Orchestra (1947)
- Buddy DeFranco quartet – New York (1953)
- Bud Powell – Piano Interpretations by Bud Powell (1956)
- Sarah Vaughan – At Mister Kelly's (1957)
- Lee Konitz – Very Cool (1957)
- Ella Fitzgerald – Hello, Love (1960)
- Johnny Mathis – I'll Buy You a Star (1961)
- Milt Jackson and Wes Montgomery – Bags Meets Wes! (1962)
- Stan Kenton – Adventures In Jazz (1962)
- Bill Evans – Moon Beams (1962)
- Dexter Gordon – Our Man in Paris (1963)
- Johnny Hartman – I Just Dropped by to Say Hello (1964)
- Benny Goodman – An Album of Swing Classics (1967)
- Carmen Cavallaro – Decca - recorded in 1947, relaeased as a reissue in (1973)
- Natalie Cole – Don't Look Back (1980)
- Mel Tormé – An Evening with Mel Tormé (1994)
- Ian Shaw – The Abbey Road Sessions (2011)

== Notable uses ==
- Major theme in the 1959 motion picture Some Like It Hot.
