= Drawn to All Things: The Songs of Joni Mitchell =

Studio album by Ian Shaw
- Released: April 3, 2006
- Recorded: 23–30 November 2005
- Genre: Vocal jazz
- Label: Linn (AKD 276)

Ian Shaw chronology
A World Still Turning (2003)	Drawn to All Things: The Songs of Joni Mitchell (2006)	Lifejacket (2008)

Drawn to All Things: The Songs of Joni Mitchell is a 2006 studio album by Ian Shaw, recorded in tribute to Joni Mitchell. This was Shaw's first album for Linn Records.

Shaw first encountered Joni Mitchell's music at the age of sixteen when he borrowed her 1971 album Blue from a library, and says that he is still "fascinated and puzzled" by the "immaculate marriage of words and music in her work".

== Critical reception ==
Professional ratings
Review scores
Source	Rating
The Penguin Guide to Jazz Recordings	3.5/4 stars

Reviews of the album were positive. Christopher Loudon of JazzTimes stated that he "always felt that the way [Mitchell] handled her own material was the only way it could be properly interpreted, and none of the pop or jazz vocalists who've since tackled Mitchell tracks have shaken my belief. Until now." Andy Robson of Jazzwise said that "this isn't Mitchell 'done' jazz any more than it's Shaw gone west coast rock: it's just (just!) a gloriously musical album, with Shaw particularly drawn to Mitchell the story teller... if you want an album that's about touching souls, then look no further". Clive Davis of The Sunday Times said that "Shaw's rococo delivery takes some getting used to ... After three or four plays, though, the feathery vocals and the pop poetry seem a much better match." Kathryn Shackleton of BBC Music said that Shaw "takes her canvas of angsty real life tableaux and stretches it over a jazz frame. It works. Beautifully. Shaw captures the poetry in Joni's songs with an eye-watering vocal range and bucketloads of soul... If you're into jazz but not Joni, don't be put off. Quality musicians and stylish scoring make this a superb listen."

== Track listing ==
1. "Jericho" – 4:14
2. "Moon at the Window" – 5:16
3. "Night in the City" – 4:09
4. "Edith and the Kingpin" – 5:17
5. "Harlem in Havana" (with Lea DeLaria) – 5:11
6. "A Case of You" – 4:14
7. "Barangrill" – 4:24
8. "Chelsea Morning" – 3:15
9. "Love or Money" – 5:48
10. "Talk to Me" – 3:55
11. "River" – 3:59
12. "Night Ride Home" (with Claire Martin) – 3:57
13. "Both Sides, Now" – 5:20
14. "Stay in Touch" – 2:50

All songs written by Joni Mitchell.

== Personnel ==
- Ian Shaw – vocals, piano, electric piano
- Lea DeLaria – vocals
- Claire Martin
- Janette Mason – piano
- Tim Lapthorn
- Simon Little – double bass
- Mark Fletcher – drums
- Miles Bould – percussion
- Richard Cottle – keyboards
- Guy Barker – trumpet
- Nigel Hitchcock – tenor saxophone
- David Preston – guitar
- Jim Mullen
- The Tapestry Strings – strings
