= The Echo of a Song =

Studio album by Ian Shaw
- Released: June 10, 1997
- Recorded: June 12–13, 1996
- Genre: Vocal jazz
- Length: 58:08
- Label: Jazz House
- Producer: Ian Shaw

Ian Shaw chronology
Famous Rainy Day (1995)	The Echo of a Song (1997)	In a New York Minute (1999)

Professional ratings
Review scores
Source	Rating
Allmusic	4/5 stars

The Echo of a Song is a 1997 studio album by Ian Shaw.

== Track listing ==
1. "I Concentrate on You" (Cole Porter) - 3:37
2. "My Heart Is Haunted" (Egan, Flynn) - 4:42
3. "It Could Happen to You" (Johnny Burke, Jimmy Van Heusen) - 3:57
4. "It's Easy to Remember (And So Hard to Forget)" (Lorenz Hart, Richard Rodgers) - 5:41
5. "Just Let Me Look at You" (Dorothy Fields, Jerome Kern) - 4:44
6. "The Echo of a Song" (Peter Mendoza) - 5:35
7. "Change Partners" (Irving Berlin) - 4:59
8. "You Are My Heart's Delight" (Steve Graham, Ludwig Herver, Franz Lehár) - 4:21
9. "Time After Time" (Sammy Cahn, Jule Styne) - 5:35
10. "You Stepped Out of a Dream" (Nacio Herb Brown, Gus Kahn) - 3:55
11. "Taking a Chance on Love" (Vernon Duke, Ted Fetter, John Latouche) - 3:22
12. "I'll Be Seeing You" (Sammy Fain, Irving Kahal) - 3:26
13. "Goodnight, Angel" (Herbert Magidson, Allie Wrubel) - 4:14

== Personnel ==
Performance

- Ian Shaw - vocals, producer, liner notes
- Simon Wallace - piano, producer
- Mark Fletcher - drums
- Geoff Gascoyne - double bass, design, drawing
- Mornington Lockett - clarinet, soprano saxophone, tenor saxophone

Production

- Chris Lewis - producer, engineer, mastering, mixing
- David Sinclair - photography
- Richard Rodney Bennett - liner notes
