= Abbey Road (disambiguation) =

Abbey Road most commonly refers to the eleventh studio album by the Beatles.

Abbey Road may also refer to:

== Places ==
- Abbey Road, Barrow-in-Furness, the main road running through Barrow-in-Furness, England, UK
- Abbey Road, London, a street in North London, England, UK after which the album was named
- Abbey Road DLR station, an East London station on the Docklands Light Railway

== Arts, entertainment, and media ==
- "Abbey Road", a song by Tori Amos
- Abbey Road E.P., an EP by Spiritualized
- Abbey Road on the River, the largest Beatles festival in the US
- Abbey Road Studios, an EMI recording studio, named after the street, which opened in 1931
- Live from Abbey Road, a recurring music television programme broadcast by More4
- "SYRE on Abbey Road", a song by Jaden Smith
- The Abbey Road E.P., an EP by Red Hot Chili Peppers

== See also ==
- The Abbey Road Sessions (disambiguation)
