= Fireworks EP =

Fireworks

EP by Embrace
- Released: 5 May 1997
- Genre: Alternative rock
- Length: 3:56
- Label: Hut

Embrace chronology
All You Good Good People (1997)	Fireworks (1997)	One Big Family (1997)

Fireworks is the first EP by English rock band Embrace, released in May 1997. It was their first release to reach the top 40 in the UK, at No. 34. It consisted of 3 songs from the debut album The Good Will Out, which reached No. 1 on the UK Albums Chart. It was mixed by renowned dub and electronic musician Ott. The popular and well recognised B-side, "Blind", was released on the North American version of the album.

== Track listing ==
All tracks are written by Danny McNamara and Richard McNamara

Main CD
No.	Title	Length
1.	"The Last Gas"	3:38
2.	"Now You're Nobody"	4:34
3.	"Blind"	3:58
4.	"Fireworks"	3:56
