= In a New York Minute =

Studio album by Ian Shaw
- Released: September 28, 1999
- Recorded: September 1998
- Genre: Vocal jazz
- Length: 61:39
- Label: Milestone
- Producer: Todd Barkan

Ian Shaw chronology
The Echo of a Song (1997)	In a New York Minute (1999)	Soho Stories (2001)

Professional ratings
Review scores
Source	Rating
AllMusic	4.5/5 stars
The Penguin Guide to Jazz Recordings	3.5/4 stars

In a New York Minute is a 1999 studio album by Ian Shaw.

== Track listing ==
1. "In a New York Minute" (Fran Landesman, Simon Wallace) – 4:12
2. "Standing in the Dark" (Sikandar Luck) – 5:22
3. "Wouldn't It Be Loverly" (Alan Jay Lerner, Frederick Loewe) – 4:55
4. "I Thought About You" (Johnny Mercer, Jimmy Van Heusen) – 4:29
5. "Furry Sings the Blues" (Joni Mitchell) – 3:46
6. "Grandma's Hands" (Bill Withers) – 3:45
7. "Alfie" (Burt Bacharach, Hal David) – 7:54
8. "All or Nothing at All" (Arthur Altman, Jack Lawrence) – 6:40
9. "Shake Down the Stars" (Eddie DeLange, Van Heusen) – 3:55
10. "No One Ever Tells You" (Hub Atwood, Carroll Coates) – 5:47
11. "Last Night When We Were Young" (Harold Arlen, Yip Harburg) – 7:59
12. "That's Life" (Kelly Gordon, Dean Kay) – 2:50

== Personnel ==
- Ian Shaw - vocals, arranger
- Iain Ballamy - saxophone
- Joe Beck - guitar
- Cedar Walton - piano, arranger
- James Pearson
- Geoff Gascoyne - arranger
- James Pearson
- Simon Wallace

Production

- Jamie Putnam - art direction, design
- Troy Halderson - engineer
- Darren Crowdy - executive producer
- Will Friedwald - liner notes
- Todd A. Gerard - mastering
- John Abbott - photography
- Jack Frisch
