= Witchcraft (Claire Martin and Richard Rodney Bennett album) =

Studio album by Claire Martin and Richard Rodney Bennett
- Released: 2010

Claire Martin chronology
| A Modern Art (2009) | Witchcraft (2010) | Too Much In Love to Care (2012) |

Richard Rodney Bennett chronology
| Richard Rodney Bennett: Words And Music (2007) | Witchcraft (2010) | Say It Isn't So (2013) |

Witchcraft is a 2010 studio album by Claire Martin and Richard Rodney Bennett.
