= A World Still Turning =

Studio album by Ian Shaw
- Released: October 13, 2003
- Recorded: June 2003
- Genre: Vocal jazz
- Label: 441
- Producer: Todd Barkan

Ian Shaw chronology
| Soho Stories (2001) | A World Still Turning (2003) | Drawn to All Things: The Songs of Joni Mitchell (2006) |

Professional ratings
Review scores
| Source | Rating |
|---|---|
| Allmusic | 4/5 stars |
| The Penguin Guide to Jazz Recordings | 4/4 stars |

A World Still Turning is a 2003 studio album by Ian Shaw.

== Critical reception ==
The Penguin Guide to Jazz Recordings awarded the album a maximum four-star rating, describing it as “engaged, passionate and musically rewarding”.

== Track listing ==
1. "Alone Again (Naturally)" (Gilbert O'Sullivan) – 4:13
2. "We All Fall in Love Sometimes" (Elton John, Bernie Taupin) – 4:21
3. "An Occasional Dream" (David Bowie) – 4:03
4. "Peace" (Kitarō, Horace Silver) – 4:28
5. "Soon As the Weather Breaks" (Bobby Bland, Margie Evans, Pea Vee) – 3:24
6. "This Is Always" (Mack Gordon, Harry Warren) – 6:49
7. "Rockabye" (Ian Shaw) – 6:43
8. "Don't Ask Why" (Alan Broadbent, Chris Hobler, Mark Murphy) – 6:04
9. "Speak Low" (Ogden Nash, Kurt Weill) – 5:55
10. "Gotta Serve Somebody" (Bob Dylan) – 3:47
11. "I'm Glad There Is You" (Jimmy Dorsey, Paul Mertz) – 3:18
12. "Guilty" (Randy Newman) – 6:09
13. "The Tourist" (Radiohead) – 6:18

== Personnel ==
- Ian Shaw – vocals, piano, arranger
- Mark Murphy – vocals (track 5)
- Mark Fletcher – drums
- Peter Washington – double bass
- Paul Bollenback – guitar
- Billy Childs – piano
- Eric Alexander – tenor saxophone
- Alan Broadbent – arranger
- Jeff Gascoyne
- James Pearson
- Nick Weldon

Production

- Laura Marzec – art direction
- Peter Doris – assistant engineer
- Derek Kwan – associate producer
- Katherine Miller – engineer
- Darren Crowdy – executive producer
- Harvey Rosen
- Alan Silverman – mastering
- Roy Hendrickson – mixing
- John Abbott – photography
- Todd Barkan – producer
