= The Abbey Road Sessions (EP) =

The Abbey Road Sessions EP

EP by Embrace
- Released: 11 January 1999
- Recorded: 19 October 1997
- Genre: Alternative
- Label: Hut Records

Embrace chronology
The Good Will Out EP (1998)	The Abbey Road Sessions EP (1999)	Hooligan (2000)

Part 2

Professional ratings
Review scores
Source	Rating
AllMusic	(Part 1)
Allmusic	(Part 2)

The Abbey Road Sessions is an extended play by English rock band Embrace. The EP was released in the form of a 2-CD set as a limited-edition version of their single "My Weakness Is None of Your Business".

The first CD came in a cardboard double gatefold CD sleeve and was available in record shops. In place of a second CD there was a card insert with the words: "Abbey Road Sessions Part 2 (for insertion into wallet) will be available later in the year details to follow". The second CD, Abbey Road Sessions Part 2, had three more tracks and was only available by mail order from the band.

All the tracks were recorded live at Abbey Road Studios on 19 October 1997. Versions of all the songs on this EP appear on their debut album The Good Will Out.

== Track listing ==
Part 1

1. My Weakness Is None of Your Business
2. Higher Sights
3. Retread

Part 2

1. All You Good Good People
2. That's All Changed Forever
3. You've Got to Say Yes
