= My Weakness Is None of Your Business =

1998 single by Embrace

Single by Embrace

from the album The Good Will Out
- B-side: "Feelings I Thought You Shared"; "Don't Turn Your Back on Love"; "Higher Sights"; "Retread"
- Released: 17 August 1998
- Length: 3:22
- Label: Hut; Virgin
- Songwriter(s): Danny McNamara; Richard McNamara
- Producer(s): Dave Creffield; Embrace

Embrace singles chronology
"Come Back to What You Know" (1998)	"My Weakness Is None of Your Business" (1998)	"Hooligan" (1999)

Professional ratings
Review scores
Source	Rating
AllMusic	(CD1)
AllMusic	(CD2)

"My Weakness Is None of Your Business" is a song by English rock band Embrace from their debut album, The Good Will Out (1998). It was released on 17 August 1998 and became the band's third top-10 single, peaking at number nine on the UK Singles Chart, but it dropped out of the top 40 the following week.

CD2 contains three songs from the album performed live at Abbey Road Studios, and is part of an EP of songs recorded live during the "Abbey Road Sessions" that was released the same year. The song had previously been included as the B-side of the limited-edition vinyl release of "All You Good Good People" in early 1997.

== Track listings ==
All tracks are written by Danny McNamara and Richard McNamara.

UK CD1 and cassette single
No.	Title	Lead vocals	Length
1.	"My Weakness Is None of Your Business"	Danny McNamara
2.	"Feelings I Thought You Shared"	D. McNamara
3.	"Don't Turn Your Back on Love"	D. McNamara

UK CD2
No.	Title	Lead vocals	Length
1.	"My Weakness Is None of Your Business"	D. McNamara
2.	"Higher Sights"	D. McNamara
3.	"Retread"	D. McNamara

UK 12-inch EP
No.	Title	Lead vocals	Length
1.	"My Weakness Is None of Your Business"	D. McNamara
2.	"Feelings I Thought You Shared"	D. McNamara
3.	"Don't Turn Your Back on Love"	D. McNamara
4.	"One Big Family" (Perfecto mix)	Richard McNamara

== Charts ==
Chart (1998)	Peak position
Europe (Eurochart Hot 100)	48
Scotland (OCC)	7
UK Singles (OCC)	9

== Release history ==
Region	Date	Format(s)	Label(s)	Ref.
United Kingdom	17 August 1998	CD; cassette	Hut; Virgin	
United Kingdom	30 November 1998	12-inch vinyl	Hut; Virgin	
