= Templecloud =

Music group from Bristol, England

Templecloud music
- Origin: Bristol, United Kingdom
- Years active: 2008–present
- Members: Simon Gwilliam, .

Templecloud music is a bespoke music company owned by composer Simon Gwilliam.

== "One Big Family" ==
"One Big Family" is the first single from Templecloud. It is a cover of the 1997 Embrace single. It was released on iTunes on 24 May 2011. Many believed that it was sung by Paloma Faith. It was actually sung by Hannah Symons.

The fast food chain KFC aired an advert in the UK which used "One Big Family" as the soundtrack.

== Discography ==
=== Singles ===
Year	Single	Peak chart position		Album
Year	Single	UK	IRE	Album
2011	"One Big Family"	24	21	
