= Lifejacket (album) =

Studio album by Ian Shaw
- Released: April 14, 2008
- Recorded: 12–15 November 2007
- Genre: Vocal jazz
- Label: Linn (AKD 311)
- Producer: Ian Shaw, David Preston

Ian Shaw chronology
Drawn to All Things: The Songs of Joni Mitchell (2006)	Lifejacket (2008)	Somewhere Towards Love (2009)

Professional ratings
Review scores
Source	Rating
The Guardian	3/5 stars

Lifejacket is a 2008 studio album by Ian Shaw.

== Critical reception ==
Christopher Loudon of JazzTimes noted that Lifejacket was Shaw's first attempt at finding his own voice, saying, "Stylistically, he sounds as if he's shrugged off the surplice, abandoned his pew and trudged through the mud in search of a long night at the nearest pub. Additionally, all 13 tracks were written or cowritten by Shaw, and demonstrate an ability to dissect social foibles and ills (while also plumbing the depths of one's own heart) that is fully on par with [Jamie] Cullum, just one generation removed. Shaw's goal, brilliantly realized, was to hold up his encroaching middle age like a prism and study all its facets." John Fordham of The Guardian stated "this gifted maverick has taken a different kind of risk, in making his life's passage 'from young man to middle-aged child' the central thread of this album of originals" and that "Shaw's mix of haunting falsettos, jazzy agility and conviction is as classy as ever". John Bungey of The Times praised "the vivid imagery, the imaginative small-group arrangements, the purring electric bass" but noted that "Shaw's emotive vocal style can sound overwrought".

== Track listing ==
1. "Love at First Tequila" – 3:56
2. "Lifejacket" – 4:38
3. "She's Loaded" – 4:08
4. "A Good and Simple Man" – 3:58
5. "Glue" – 4:19
6. "Forty-Two" (Ian Shaw) – 5:03
7. "Northop Road" – 3:15
8. "Pamela" – 4:21
9. "I Want to Live in Paris" – 3:41
10. "Hiraeth" – 3:02
11. "My Safest Place" – 3:43
12. "Letter from a Dead Soldier" (Shaw) – 4:25
13. "Flowers" (Rozz Williams) – 3:40

All songs written by David Preston and Ian Shaw, except where noted.

== Personnel ==
- Ian Shaw - vocals, piano
- Liane Carroll - vocals
- Thad Kelly - double bass
- Mark Fletcher - drums
- Thebe Lipere - percussion
- Guy Barker - trumpet, flugelhorn
- Julian Siegel - tenor saxophone, soprano saxophone, bass clarinet
- David Preston - guitar, composer
- Gabriella Swallow - cello
