= Lifejackets (album) =

Studio album by Mimas
- Released: 25 October 2010
- Genre: Indie rock, alternative rock
- Length: 41:08
- Label: BSM
- Producer: Kenn Hedegaard Eskildsen

Mimas chronology
The Worries (2008)	Lifejackets (2010)	Strong Ties (2014)

Professional ratings
Review scores
Source	Rating
Alter The Press	4.5/5 stars
Rock Sound	7/10 stars

Lifejackets is the second album by Danish based indie rock band Mimas. It was produced by original keyboardist Kenn Hedegaard Eskildsen.

== Track listing ==
All music is composed by Mimas

No.	Title	Length
1.	"Application"	5:22
2.	"La Moustache Formidable"	4:18
3.	"Manflu"	4:25
4.	"Sodapop Stalkers"	4:23
5.	"Rotting Rodents"	4:06
6.	"Smom"	3:29
7.	"Vader In Burgos"	3:52
8.	"Touring The Riot Scene"	6:32
9.	"Relationship"	4:46
Total length:		41:08

== Personnel ==
Mimas

- Snævar Njáll Albertsson - vocals/guitar/trumpet
- Daniel Beck - guitar
- Lasse Christensen - drums
- Gert Hoberg Jørgensen - bass/backing vocals
