= The Good Will Out =

Studio album by Embrace
- Released: 8 June 1998
- Recorded: Early 1997
- Studios: Hook End, Checkendon, Oxfordshire; Whitfield Street, London; Metropolis, London
- Genres: Britpop; post-Britpop
- Length: 59:05
- Labels: Hut; Virgin; Mobetta
- Producers: Dave Creffield; Embrace; Martin "Youth" Glover

Embrace chronology
The Good Will Out (1998)	Drawn from Memory (2000)

Singles from The Good Will Out
- 1. "All You Good Good People" Released: 27 October 1997; 2. "Come Back to What You Know" Released: 25 May 1998; 3. "My Weakness Is None of Your Business" Released: 17 August 1998

The Good Will Out is the debut studio album by English rock band Embrace, released on 8 June 1998, by Hut, Mobetta and Virgin Records. The band formed in 1993; by 1996, they consisted of vocalist Danny McNamara, his brother, guitarist Richard McNamara, drummer Mike Heaton and bassist Steve Firth, and Tony Perrin had become their manager. A single, "All You Good Good People", was released through Fierce Panda in February 1997, attracting music media and record label interest, resulting in the band signing to Hut. Produced by the band, Dave Creffield and Martin "Youth" Glover, sessions for their debut were held at the Hook End, Whitfield Street and Metropolis studios. Other production staff included Jonny Dollar, who almost produced the album, Steve Osborne, who did additional production on one song, and Hugo Nicolson, who handled recording on another.

On release, reviewers described The Good Will Out as a Britpop album; it has since been regarded by some reviewers as a post-Britpop album. Keyboardist Mickey Dale, who would join the band during the album's touring cycle, contributed to the recordings, alongside Wil Malone and Craig Armstrong, all three of whom helped with the string sections. Two EPs, Fireworks EP and One Big Family EP, were released in mid-1997 and promoted with festival appearances and a tour of the United Kingdom. A re-recorded version of "All You Good Good People" was released as the lead single from The Good Will Out on 27 October 1997, which was promoted with a UK tour. "Come Back to What You Know" was released as the album's second single on 25 May 1998, followed by the third single "My Weakness Is None of Your Business" on 17 August 1998. Following this, the band toured the UK and Japan.

The Good Will Out received generally favourable reviews from critics, some of whom praised the high-quality songwriting and noted comparisons to the work of Oasis and the Verve. The album topped the UK chart and reached number two in Scotland. It went gold in the UK on the first day of release and was certified platinum in that territory by the end of the year. All three singles charted within the top 10 of the UK Singles Charts and Scottish Singles Charts, with "Come Back to What You Know" peaking the highest at number six in the former and number four in the latter, respectively. NME included the album on their list of the best albums of the year.

== Background ==
In 1993, vocalist Danny McNamara and his brother, guitarist Richard McNamara, formed Embrace in the English town of Huddersfield, initially under the name Christiania F and later the Bus Conductors. At the time, Richard was playing drums for the thrash metal band Gross Misconduct. After placing an ad in a local publication, the pair drafted Mike Heaton to play drums. Following a handful of live shows, one of which earned an unfavourable piece in Melody Maker, the band took a break from performing to focus on writing material. Their sound during this time was a mix of Echo & the Bunnymen, Joy Division and the early work of U2. During a performance at the Heineken Festival in Leeds, McNamara had an epiphany where he saw himself as "Ian McCullough or Bono or someone", and decided to perform as himself going forward. The day after, they scrapped all of the material that they had gathered up to that point and started again. Over the next two years, they stayed in a rehearsal room, prior to Richard McNamara finding a recording of "Retread" in Danny's set of demos. Richard McNamara felt this song was a turning point for their musical direction as he thought it sounded like no other act.

Their bassist found religion, prompting him to be replaced by Steve Firth in 1996. Around this time, the band sent demos to potential managers and eventually settled with Tony Perrin. Leading up to an appearance at the 1996 Sound City festival in Leeds, they compiled 30 copies of a demo tape that was sent out to potential labels, receiving replies from 18 of them. Three showcases were held at the Duchess of York in Leeds; the band eventually signed to major label Virgin imprint Hut Records in September 1996. They also signed with DGC Records in the United States. Embrace were already friends with the head of Hut, who was promoted to the president of Virgin around the same time. Perrin said he knew people at Geffen Records, who owned DGC; A&R staff member Tony Berg signed the band to the label. Independent label Fierce Panda Records released "All You Good Good People", with "My Weakness Is None of Your Business" as its B-side, in February 1997. It was promoted with a tour alongside the Longpigs, and caught the attention of music publications.

== Recording ==
Embrace, with Dave Creffield and Martin "Youth" Glover, produced The Good Will Out, which was recorded in early 1997. Jonny Dollar, who mixed "Now You're Nobody", was asked to produce the album, but declined for personal reasons. Steve Osborne did additional production on "One Big Family"; Dollar's lack of involvement allowed Osborne to work with Embrace; he had wanted to work again with a rock-centric band. The band attempted unsuccessfully to draft Steve Albini as producer, and had turned down Butch Vig previously. All the previously released tracks on the final version of the album were re-recorded during the sessions. Danny McNamara explained: "Everyone says we write songs like we're on our third or fourth album, but the early tracks still had the sound of a fledgling band so I wanted more definitive versions."

Dave Creffield and the band produced nearly all the final recordings except for "All You Good Good People" and "Come Back to What You Know" produced by Youth at Hook End Studios, near Checkendon, Oxfordshire. While Creffield handled most of the recording, Hugo Nicolson recorded "All You Good Good People" and "Come Back to What You Know"; both tracks had additional recording by Creffield. Guitars on "The Last Gas" were recorded at an unnamed studio in Nottingham. The piano on "That's All Changed Forever" was recorded at Whitfield Street Studios in London. A 24-piece orchestra at Metropolis Studios in London was recorded playing the string arrangements. McNamara thought the orchestra warming up "sound[ed] incredible", and ran into the studio's control room to have it recorded as the intro piece. He asked the orchestra to repeat what they had been doing; they could not remember and just improvised. On the second occasion the band worked with an orchestra, they had the tape rolling; the conductor can be heard filling out Musicians' Union forms. Dale described the piece as capturing the "feel" and "all the excitement and ALL the nerves in the room". "Fireworks"' piano was recorded at Metropolis as Dollar wanted the band to use the studio's Fazioli piano. Youth and Nicolson mixed the recordings except "Now You're Nobody". Bunt Stafford-Clark mastered the album at Townhouse Studios in London.

== Composition and lyrics ==
Musically, the sound of The Good Will Out has been described as Britpop and post-Britpop. It was compared to the works of Oasis and the Verve, which McNamara felt worked as "good promotion" for the release, but clarified that "90% of 'The Good Will Out' was already written when these bands weren't even successful". Consumable Online writer Sean Eric McGill avoided making analogies to either act, instead connecting to Embrace's sound to that of Queen, as he explained: "like Queen, Embrace writes finely crafted rock/pop songs that can only be described as 'huge'". Wil Malone served as the conductor for a string section of the album, and Mickey Dale added keyboards to the recordings. While the album's booklet credits Dale with helping to arrange the strings, Richard McNamara said Craig Armstrong (who worked with Massive Attack at the time) had helped in that regard. The album's title is based on the proverb the truth will out, referring to being positive. It opens with the 40-second "Intro", which consists of an orchestra setting up their instruments, ending with drum hits that segue into "All You Good Good People", which also features said orchestra. Dale said "All You Good Good People" was the first time he had worked with the band; they required a string arrangement and had asked him for one. The track began originally as "Mikes Fast", and went through multiple versions before ending up in its final form. Varying tape noises can be heard, the result of the tape with Danny McNamara's vocals being fast-forwarded and rewound.

"Sweetness" (1994) by Michelle Gayle influenced "My Weakness Is None of Your Business". McNamara had Leonard Cohen-esque verses for the song for sometime and a call-and-response chorus, before writing the hook after hearing "Sweetness". The band intended holding back "Come Back to What You Know" for their second album until publicist Scott Piering heard the song and pushed for its release. McNamara said an earlier version of "One Big Family" was "a lot more chaotic", influenced by "Naked Cousin (1996) by PJ Harvey. It features Richard McNamara on lead vocals and tambourine; the group vocals consist of friends, partners, and people from the street, under the name the Bricklayers. "Higher Sights" is a power ballad in the vein of INXS, and was inspired by "You Do" (1995) by McAlmont & Butler. Danny McNamara said he wrote the song after someone told the band they "weren't [B]ritpop enough". Dale said the string players had struggled with the song as the scores were written in the wrong key; the players had to transpose the score while recording it. "Retread", a ballad, details the end of a relationship. The guitar riff was played on every guitar the band had before they settled on the final tone. "I Want the World" features the use of wah-wah pedals and feedback, and was compared to the work of Oasis. In its original form, the song sounded closer to the Jesus and Mary Chain; Richard McNamara attempted emulating Tim Burgess of the Charlatans.

"You've Got to Say Yes" was about Heaton's best friend Dean who had an "incredibly tough life", and was influenced by the work of Curtis Mayfield. Initially, the song was called "Shallow Time", had a saxophone, and a section in 6/8 time. For "Fireworks", Danny McNamara sang a soul-esque rendition, before they added their instruments. He wrote the lyrics to it while sat under a mixing desk. The intro to "The Last Gas" is a snippet from a radio show about orangutans; it includes shouting by the Bricklayers. The album's final three tracks are piano-led pieces: "That's All Changed Forever", "Now You're Nobody" and "The Good Will Out". "That's All Changed Forever" was influenced by McNamara falling in love, and the affects love has on a person's life. The chorus was inspired after the band saw Superstar, who had a song with a similar sound. The lyrics include a reference to a conversation McNamara and Dale had at Heaton's house in 1995. With "Now You're Nobody", Dale said the band took a "very Pet Sounds approach", like quieting the drum and bass parts, and adding a lot of reverb. Richard McNamara said they dismantled a music box to sample its notes for the song. "The Good Will Out" was the result of combining two separate songs, and is reminiscent of "Hey Jude" (1968) by the Beatles. It had a different verse from what ended up on the album, which Jazz Summers said was acceptable, though McNamara thought he could do better, and subsequently re-wrote it. Discussing the closing "la-la-la" section, McNamara said it was the "most emotional moment during the recording [...] Think about it, everyone understands La-la-la".

== Release and promotion ==
=== Pre-album singles and EPs ===
The Fireworks EP released on 5 May 1997, featured "The Last Gas", "Now You're Nobody", "Blind" and "Fireworks". The music video for "The Last Gas" sees the band perform in a darkly-lit room, while a lyric video for "Fireworks" consists of shots of a desert landscape. Following this, Embrace went on a sold-out UK tour. The One Big Family EP released on 7 July 1997, featured "One Big Family", "Dry Kids", "You've Only Got to Stop to Get Better" and "Butter Wouldn't Melt". In the music video for "One Big Family", footage of the band performing the track is cut with shots of them at an amusement park. The band promoted it with appearances at Glastonbury, T in the Park, Phoenix, V and the Reading Festivals, as well as a three-date residency at the Institute of Contemporary Arts in London.

The re-recorded version of "All You Good Good People" was released as a single on 27 October 1997. Two versions were released on CD: the first, dubbed the All You Good Good People EP, with "You Don't Amount to Anything – This Time", "The Way I Do" and "Free Ride", while the other included a Perfecto remix of "One Big Family", the Fierce Panda version of "All You Good Good People", as well as an orchestral version of it. The music video for "All You Good Good People", which was directed by Mary Scanton, consists of a mix of black-and-white and colour performance footage. The band went on a tour of mainland Europe, before touring the UK in November 1997.

"Come Back to What You Know" was released as a single on 25 May 1998. Two versions were released on CD: the first with "Love Is Back", "If You Feel Like a Sinner" and "Perfect Way", while the other featured live versions of "Butter Wouldn't Melt" and "Dry Kids", as well as an orchestral version of "Come Back to What You Know". The music video for "Come Back to What You Know", which was directed by Olly Blackburn, features people in different locations that meet up by its end, interspersed with clips of the band performing. Coinciding with this, the band embarked on a short four-date tour of the UK.

=== Album promotion and later singles ===
Hut, Mobetta and Virgin Records released The Good Will Out on 8 June 1998. The album cover was photographed on Christopher Street in New York City; the shoot cost around £25,000 according to Danny McNamara. The chosen image was taken by photographer Mary Scanlon, who spent a day following the band around, during the evening. It was promoted with an in-store performance and signing session at HMV's flagship store on Oxford Street in London. Following this, the band performed at Glastonbury Festival. The US release of the album, on 28 July 1998, featured a re-recorded version of "Blind" subtitled the "road version". It was promoted there with "All You Good Good People", which was issued to modern rock radio stations. They had tried to tour US, but were unable to when Geffen Records dropped them from the roster, despite "All You Good Good People" performing well at radio stations.

"My Weakness Is None of Your Business" was released as a single on 17 August 1998. The CD version included "Feelings I Thought You Shared" and "Don't Turn Your Back on Me", while the 12" vinyl version featured those two songs and the Perfecto remix of "One Big Family". An edition dubbed The Abbey Road Sessions, recorded at Abbey Road Studios, was also released with versions of "My Weakness Is None of Your Business", "Higher Sights" and "Retread". The music video for "My Weakness Is None of Your Business" consists of stop-motion movement of McNamara being assaulted in a club and thrown in the back of a car. He is then taken to the roof of a building, and it ends with a shot of him hanging off the side of it as people watch from below.

Embrace embarked on a tour of the UK in September 1998, and then Japan and played three shows in the US. Before embarking on a European tour at the end of the year, touring keyboardist Mickey Dale was made an official member. The Good Will Out EP was released on 30 November 1998, consisting of the previously released live version of "Butter Wouldn't Melt" and "Dry Kids", as well as the "road version" of "Blind". The Abbey Road Sessions Part 2 was also released with session versions of "All You Good Good People", "That's All Changed Forever" and "You've Got to Say Yes".

=== Reissues and related releases ===
"All You Good Good People", "My Weakness Is None of Your Business", "Come Back to What You Know", "One Big Family", "Fireworks" and "The Good Will Out" were included on the band's first compilation album, Fireworks (Singles 1997–2002) (2002). "All You Good Good People", "Come Back to What You Know", "One Big Family" and the "road version" of "Blind" were included on the band's third compilation album, The Essential (2007). The band performed The Good Will Out live in its entirety for a series of shows in 2019. The London show at the Roundhouse was recorded and released as the live album The Good Will Out (Live) that same year. Firth reasoned that they had "never done a live album", funding the release of it through PledgeMusic. When asked if the studio version would be reissued, he explained that as they had large debts with their former labels, they had no financial incentive to do so: "it'd just be a vanity project really. There'd be no money in it for us". The studio version was re-pressed on vinyl, with their second studio album Drawn from Memory (2000) and their third studio album If You've Never Been (2001), in 2020.

== Critical reception ==
Professional ratings
Review scores
Source	Rating
AllMusic	4/5 stars
Dotmusic	8/10
Encyclopedia of Popular Music	5/5 stars
NME	9/10
Melody Maker	9/10
PopMatters	5.7/10
Q	2/5 stars
Rolling Stone	2/5 stars
The Times	7/10 stars

The Good Will Out was met with generally favourable reviews from music critics. James Oldham of NME saw the album as a collection of "uplifting optimism that substitutes vulnerability for bravado, and heartfelt sentiment for boisterous thrills". His only complaint was the band's "not so confident [...] crazed hedonism", concluding the release was "one of the great debut albums of the past decade". Melody Maker's Mark Sutherland said after his first listen to the album, he was immediately struck "not its arrogance, but it's humility". He expanded on this by saying the band were "at their least engaging when they resemble their caricature [...] and merely endearing when pulling self-consciously 'classic' tricks". AllMusic reviewer Stephen Thomas Erlewine said the album had a lot of expectation on release; it was viewed as the "heir apparent to the lad-rock throne", and one listen of the album "illustrates why -- the group ingeniously combines the anthemic hooks and monolithic roar of Oasis with the sweeping aural majesty of the Verve". He said the songs were "quite good, and they're performed passionately".

The staff at Dotmusic said the album "challenges The Verve and Oasis out to compare the size of their anthems and the sweetness of their ballads". They added that while the album, "sounds massively important, it lacks the soul of [frontman Richard] Ashcroft & co". Rolling Stone reviewer Matt Diehel said the band "drag out all the Brit-pop devices" on the album from the "obvious Beatles references [...] to Stone Roses-ish hubris". He added the band's "main problem is lack of personality". In a review for The Times, Mike Pattenden wrote that when the band "put the bluster to one side they hit a genuinely soulful note", but "when they try and rock their impact is diminished". PopMatters editor Sarah Zupko said the tracks "don't quite possess the instant hooks" that Oasis member Noel Gallagher "is a master" of. Despite this, she called it "a pretty good album of middle-of-the-road Britpop". Q writer Andrew Collins said tracks like "The Last Gas" and "All You Good Good People" were the band's "stock-in-trade" which was "rousing in short doses but punishing over an hour, chiefly due to Danny McNamara's limited voice". He noted strings were "employed relentlessly but the result is like underlining a shopping list for effect".

== Commercial performance and accolades ==
The Good Will Out peaked at number one in the UK and number two in Scotland. It ranked at number 52 on the UK's year-end chart for 1998. The Fireworks EP charted at number 34 in Scotland and the UK. The One Big Family EP charted at number 21 in the UK and number 22 in Scotland. "All You Good Good People" charted at number seven in Scotland and number eight in the UK. "Come Back to What You Know" charted at number four in Scotland and number six in the UK. "My Weakness Is None of Your Business" charted at number seven in Scotland and number nine in the UK.

The Good Will Out went gold on its first day of release, and was certified platinum by the British Phonographic Industry (BPI) by the end of the year. The album is ranked number 993 in All-Time Top 1000 Albums (3rd. edition, 2000). NME ranked the album at number 12 on their list of the best albums of the year.

== Track listing ==
All songs written by Danny McNamara and Richard McNamara.

The Good Will Out track listing
No.	Title	Producer	Length
1.	"Intro"	Dave Creffield; Embrace	0:46
2.	"All You Good Good People"	Youth	6:06
3.	"My Weakness Is None of Your Business"	Creffield; Embrace	3:17
4.	"Come Back to What You Know"	Youth	4:10
5.	"One Big Family"	Creffield; Embrace; Steve Osborne (add.)	4:05
6.	"Higher Sights"	Creffield; Embrace	3:44
7.	"Retread"	Creffield; Embrace	3:39
8.	"I Want the World"	Creffield; Embrace	5:44
9.	"You've Got to Say Yes"	Creffield; Embrace	3:42
10.	"Fireworks"	Creffield; Embrace	3:58
11.	"The Last Gas"	Creffield; Embrace	3:44
12.	"That's All Changed Forever"	Creffield; Embrace	4:13
13.	"Now You're Nobody"	Creffield; Embrace	4:23
14.	"The Good Will Out"	Creffield; Embrace	7:00

== Personnel ==
Personnel per booklet, except where noted.

Embrace

- Danny McNamara – lead vocals
- Richard McNamara – guitar, backing vocals, lead vocals (tracks 5 and 8)
- Mike Heaton – drums, backing vocals
- Steve Firth – bass

Additional musicians

- Mickey Dale – keyboards, string arrangements
- Wil Malone – conductor

Production and design

- Martin "Youth" Glover – producer (tracks 2 and 4), mixing (all except track 13)
- Dave Creffield – producer (all except tracks 2 and 4), additional recording (tracks 2 and 4), recording (all except tracks 2 and 4)
- Embrace – producer (all except tracks 2 and 4), design
- Steve Osborne – additional production (track 5)
- Hugo Nicolson – mixing (all except track 13), recording (tracks 2 and 4)
- Jonny Dollar – mixing (track 13)
- Bunt Stafford-Clark – mastering
- Blue Source – design
- Mary Scanlon – photography

== Charts and certifications ==
=== Weekly charts ===
Chart performance for The Good Will Out
Chart (1998)	Peak position
Scottish Albums (Official Charts)	2
UK Albums (Official Charts)	1

=== Year-end charts ===
1998 year-end chart performance for The Good Will Out
Chart (1998)	Position
UK Albums (OCC)	52

=== Certifications ===
Certifications for The Good Will Out
Region	Certification	Certified units/sales
United Kingdom (BPI)	Platinum	300,000^{^}
^{^} Shipments figures based on certification alone.

== See also ==
- Urban Hymns – the 1997 album by the Verve, also produced by Youth
