= Come Back to What You Know =

1998 single by Embrace

Single by Embrace

from the album The Good Will Out
- Released: 25 May 1998
- Length: 4:09
- Label: Hut, Virgin
- Songwriters: Danny McNamara, Richard McNamara
- Producer: Youth

Embrace singles chronology
"All You Good Good People" (1997)	"Come Back to What You Know" (1998)	"My Weakness Is None of Your Business" (1998)

Professional ratings
Review scores
Source	Rating
AllMusic	2/5 stars

"Come Back to What You Know" is a song by English rock band Embrace, released as the fourth single from their debut album, The Good Will Out (1998), on 25 May 1998. The song reached number six on the UK Singles Chart, becoming the band's highest-charting single until "Nature's Law" peaked at number two in 2006. B-side "Love Is Back" was later included on Embrace's compilation album Dry Kids: B-Sides 1997-2005.

== Track listings ==
All tracks are written by Danny McNamara and Richard McNamara.

UK CD1, 12-inch, cassette single
No.	Title	Length
1.	"Come Back to What You Know"
2.	"Love Is Back"
3.	"If You Feel Like a Sinner"
4.	"Perfect Way"

UK CD2
No.	Title	Length
1.	"Come Back to What You Know"
2.	"Butter Wouldn't Melt" (live at the ICA)
3.	"Dry Kids" (live at the ICA)
4.	"Come Back to What You Know" (orchestral version)

== Charts ==
Chart (1998)	Peak position
Europe (Eurochart Hot 100)	58
Scottish Singles Sales (Official Charts)	4
UK Singles (Official Charts)	6

=== Year-end charts ===
Chart (1998)	Position
UK Singles (OCC)	170

== Release history ==
Region	Date	Format(s)	Label(s)	Ref.
United Kingdom	25 May 1998	CD; cassette	Hut; Virgin	
United Kingdom	30 November 1998	12-inch vinyl	Hut; Virgin	
