= The Abbey Road Sessions (Ian Shaw album) =

Studio album by Ian Shaw
- Released: 14 March 2011
- Recorded: 2010
- Genre: Vocal jazz
- Length: 35:39
- Label: Splash Point Records
- Producer: Neal Richardson

Ian Shaw chronology
Somewhere Towards Love (2009)	The Abbey Road Sessions (2011)	A Ghost in Every Bar: The Lyrics of Fran Landesman (2012)

The Abbey Road Sessions is a 2011 studio album by Welsh musician Ian Shaw. It was released on 14 March 2011 by Splash Point Records.

== Critical reception ==
Professional ratings
Review scores
Source	Rating
The Guardian	3/5 stars

In a review for The Guardian, jazz critic John Fordham wrote "Shaw is cool but never calculatingly crooner-hip. Perhaps he occasionally embroiders too much for lyrics lovers, and the band might have welcomed a few more hours together, but this is a fitting document for one of the UK's most honest and musical jazz vocalists." At JazzTimes, Christopher Loudon explained: "Shaw was positively fizzing with excitement. It must have also been the launch of his lushly arranged latest album The Abbey Road Sessions... he's in danger of becoming a national treasure."

== Track listing ==
The Abbey Road Sessions track listing
No.	Title	Writer(s)	Length
1.	"Get Out of Town"	Cole Porter	3:48
2.	"Human Nature"	Steve Porcaro; John Bettis	4:17
3.	"Skylark"	Hoagy Carmichael; Johnny Mercer	2:06
4.	"Obsession"	Danilo Caymmi; Tracy Mann; Gilson Peranzzetta	3:22
5.	"Stuck in the Middle with You"	Gerry Rafferty; Joe Egan	3:18
6.	"Since I Fell for You"	Buddy Johnson	4:16
7.	"The Lady's In Love With You"	Burton Lane; Frank Loesser	3:28
8.	"I'm Thru with Love/Day Dream"	Gus Kahn; Fud Livingston; Matty Malneck); (John La Touche; Billy Strayhorn; Duke Ellington	7:19
9.	"Be Cool"	Joni Mitchell	4:23
10.	"I Get Along Without You Very Well"	Carmichael; Jane Brown Thompson	5:03
11.	"Darn That Dream"	Jimmy Van Heusen; Eddie DeLange	4:21
12.	"Today I Sing the Blues"		4:13
13.	"Stairway to the Stars"	Mitchell Parish; Malneck; Frank Signorelli	1:52

== Personnel ==
- Ian Shaw - vocals
- Peter Ind - double bass (all tracks except track 5)
- David Preston - guitar
- Phil Ware - piano
- Gene Calderazzo - drums
- Zhenya Strigalev - alto saxophone
- Miguel Gorodi - trumpet
- David BeeBee - double bass (on track 5)
