= Claire Martin (singer) =

English jazz singer

Claire Martin OBE
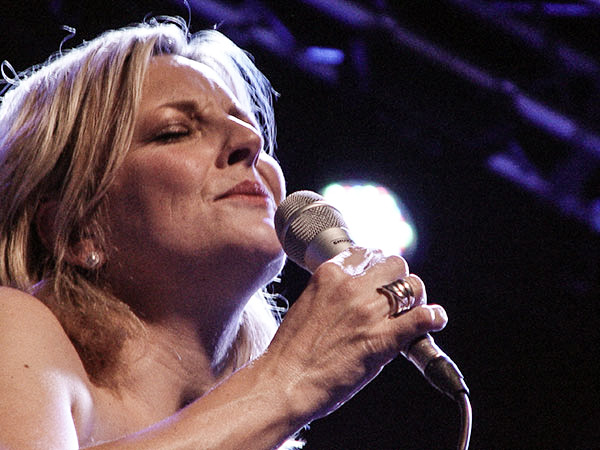
- Claire Martin at Aarhus Jazz Festival 2011

Background information
- Born: 6 September 1967 (age 59); Wimbledon, London, England
- Genres: Jazz, vocal jazz
- Occupation: Singer
- Years active: 1988–present
- Label: Linn
- Website: clairemartinjazz.co.uk

Claire Martin, OBE (born 6 September 1967) is an English jazz singer.

== Music career ==
Martin was born in Colliers Wood, London. She grew up in a house "full of music" thanks to jazz-loving parents. She cites Ella Fitzgerald's Song Books as the inspiration for her to study singing at the Doris Holford Stage School in New York and London. She was influenced to sing jazz when she saw Betty Carter at Ronnie Scott's club.

Her professional career began at the age of 19 when she sang in a hotel band at the Savoy Hotel in Bournemouth, after auditioning to be a bluecoat. For two years, she worked aboard the cruise ship QE II, where she sang in the piano bar.

When she was 21, she formed her jazz quartet. In 1991, she was signed by the Scottish jazz label Linn Records, and her debut album, The Waiting Game, was released in 1992. Later that year, she performed as the opening act for Tony Bennett at the Glasgow International Jazz Festival.

Martin has performed all over Europe and Asia with her trio, and with late Richard Rodney Bennett in an intimate cabaret duo setting in the United Kingdom and America. They played to sell-out crowds at venues, including the Algonquin Hotel in New York City. She has been a featured soloist with the Halle Orchestra, the Royal Liverpool Philharmonic, the RTÉ Concert Orchestra, the BBC Big Band, and the BBC Concert Orchestra. She has co-presented BBC Radio 3's Jazz Line Up since 2000 and has interviewed many of her musical heroes, such as Pat Metheny, Michael Brecker, Brad Mehldau, and André Previn. She has collaborated with Martin Taylor, John Martyn, Stéphane Grappelli, Kenny Barron, Richard Rodney Bennett, Jim Mullen, and Nigel Hitchcock. Martin also regularly appears with the singer and pianist Ian Shaw, and they are currently collaborating on a new duo show for 2025.

Martin has toured extensively throughout the UK, Scandinavia, Russia, and China. In 2011, she debuted with pianist Bill Charlap at Lincoln Center in New York City and performed at the Algonquin Hotel for a three-week residency with Rodney Bennett. Martin recorded with jazz pianist Kenny Barron on Too Much in Love to Care (Linn, 2011). In 2013, she toured with her show, The Two of U, and worked with conductor John Wilson, Joe Stilgoe, Mark McGann, and the Royal Liverpool Philharmonic, celebrating the music of Paul McCartney and John Lennon.

Martin collaborated with the Montpellier Cello Quartet, performing arrangements written for her by Rodney Bennett, Mark Anthony Turnage, and Django Bates. This chamber jazz ensemble toured throughout 2014 to promote the album Time and Place, which featured singer and pianist Joe Stilgoe, who became Martin's cabaret partner.

In August 2020, Martin also sang several songs in the BBC Radio 2 show Sunday Night is Music Night (Sinatraland), which was dedicated to Frank Sinatra's music.

== Awards and honours ==
- Best Vocalist, British Jazz Awards, 2009, 2010
- Best New Recording, Too Much in Love to Care, British Jazz Awards, 2012
- Officer of the Order of the British Empire (OBE), 2011

== Discography ==
- The Waiting Game (Linn, 1992)
- Devil May Care (Linn, 1993)
- Old Boyfriends (Linn, 1994)
- Off Beat (Linn, 1995)
- Make This City Ours (Linn, 1997)
- Take My Heart (Linn, 1999)
- Perfect Alibi (Linn, 2000)
- Too Darn Hot! (Linn, 2002)
- Secret Love (Linn, 2004)
- Girl Talk with Mari Wilson, Barb Jungr (Linn, 2005)
- When Lights Are Low with Richard Rodney Bennett (Linn, 2005)
- He Never Mentioned Love (Remembering Shirley Horn) (Linn, 2007)
- A Modern Art (Linn, 2009)
- Witchcraft with Richard Rodney Bennett (Linn, 2011)
- Too Much in Love to Care with Kenny Barron (Linn, 2012)
- Say It Isn't So with Richard Rodney Bennett (Linn, 2013)
- Time & Place (Linn, 2014)
- We've Got a World That Swings with Ray Gelato (Linn, 2016)
- Bumpin' (Celebrating Wes Montgomery) with Jim Mullen (Stunt, 2018)
- Believin' It (Linn, 2019)
- Songs and Stories with Callum Au (Stunt, 2020)
- I Watch You Sleep (Stunt, 2023)
- Almost in Your Arms (Stunt, 2024)
