= Famous Rainy Day =

Studio album by Ian Shaw
- Released: 1995
- Recorded: 1995
- Genre: Vocal jazz
- Length: 52:48
- Label: EFZ Records

Ian Shaw chronology
Lazy Blue Eyes (1990)	Famous Rainy Day (1995)	Ghostsongs (1996)

Famous Rainy Day is a 1995 studio album by Ian Shaw.

Only 5,000 copies of Famous Rainy Day were printed, and the record company, EFZ Records went out of business shortly afterwards.
