= All You Good Good People =

1997 single by Embrace

Single by Embrace

from the album The Good Will Out
- Released: 10 February 1997
- Genre: Alternative rock; Britpop
- Length: 6:06
- Label: Fierce Panda
- Songwriters: Danny McNamara; Richard McNamara
- Producer: Youth

Embrace singles chronology
"All You Good Good People" (1997)	"Come Back to What You Know" (1998)

"All You Good Good People" is a song by English rock band Embrace, released on the Fierce Panda label as their debut single. Only 1,300 copies were made in 1997, but it was named NME's single of the week of 15 February 1997, and the airplay received by key radio shows was enough to gain significant recognition. An extended play (EP) containing the song was released on 27 October 1997, peaking at number eight on the UK Singles Chart that November. The 1,300 originals, mixed by dub and electronica artist Ott, are now collector's items.

== Track listing ==
All tracks are written by Danny McNamara and Richard McNamara.

UK limited-edition 7-inch single
No.	Title	Length
1.	"All You Good Good People"
2.	"My Weakness Is None of Your Business"

== EP release ==
All You Good Good People EP

EP by Embrace
- Released: 27 October 1997
- Genre: Alternative rock
- Length: 6:06
- Labels: Hut, Virgin
- Producer: Youth

Embrace chronology
One Big Family EP (1997)	All You Good Good People EP (1997)	The Good Will Out EP (1998)

Professional ratings
Review scores
Source	Rating
AllMusic	3/5 stars

The All You Good Good People EP was released on 27 October 1997 by Hut Records as the first single from the band's debut album, "The Good Will Out" (1998). It became their biggest single to date at the time, and their first to reach the top 10, peaking at number eight.

The video for the US single featured Danny McNamara portraying a death row inmate during the last day before execution. The promo features a shaven-headed McNamara being executed in a replica of Tennessee's electric chair. The songs "The Way I Do", "Free Ride" and "One Big Family" (Perfecto mix) are featured on the B-sides compilation Dry Kids: B-Sides 1997–2005.

=== Track listings ===
All tracks are written by Danny McNamara and Richard McNamara.

UK CD1, 12-inch, and cassette EP
No.	Title	Lead vocals	Length
1.	"All You Good Good People"	Danny McNamara
2.	"You Don't Amount to Anything – This Time"	Danny McNamara
3.	"The Way I Do"	Richard McNamara
4.	"Free Ride"	Danny McNamara

UK CD2
No.	Title	Lead vocals	Length
1.	"All You Good Good People" (radio edit)	Danny McNamara
2.	"One Big Family" (Perfecto mix)	Richard McNamara
3.	"All You Good Good People" (Fierce Panda mix)	Danny McNamara
4.	"All You Good Good People" (orchestral version)	Danny McNamara

Japanese CD EP
No.	Title	Length
1.	"All You Good Good People"
2.	"You Don't Amount to Anything – This Time"
3.	"The Way I Do"
4.	"Free Ride"
5.	"All You Good Good People" (orchestral mix)
6.	"All You Good Good People" (Fierce Panda version)

Japanese Love Is Back EP
No.	Title	Length
1.	"All You Good Good People" (edit)
2.	"Butter Wouldn't Melt" (live at the ICA)
3.	"One Big Family" (Perfect mix)
4.	"Dry Kids" (live at the ICA)
5.	"You've Only Got to Stop to Get Better"
6.	"Come Back to What You Know" (orchestral)
7.	"Don't Turn Your Back on Love"
8.	"Love Is Back"

=== Charts ===
Chart (1997)	Peak position
Europe (Eurochart Hot 100)	43
Scottish Singles Sales (Official Charts)	7
UK Singles (Official Charts)	8

== Release history ==
Region	Version	Date	Format(s)	Label(s)	Ref.
United Kingdom	"All You Good Good People"	10 February 1997	7-inch vinyl	Fierce Panda	
United Kingdom	All You Good Good People EP	27 October 1997	CD; cassette	Hut; Virgin	
Japan	All You Good Good People EP	28 January 1998	CD	Hut; Virgin	
Japan	Love Is Back EP	6 November 1998	CD	Hut; Virgin	
United Kingdom	All You Good Good People EP	30 November 1998	12-inch vinyl	Hut; Virgin	
