= When Lights Are Low (Claire Martin and Richard Rodney Bennett album) =

Studio album by Claire Martin and Richard Rodney Bennett
- Released: September 5, 2005
- Genre: Vocal, Jazz
- Length: 52:25
- Label: Linn Records
- Producer: Richard Cottle

Professional ratings
Review scores
Source	Rating
All About Jazz	4/5 stars
The Penguin Guide to Jazz Recordings	3/4 stars

When Lights Are Low is a 2005 studio album by Claire Martin and Richard Rodney Bennett.

== Track listing ==
No.	Title	Length
1.	"My One and Only"	2:39
2.	"I Was a Little Too Lonely"	2:02
3.	"My Mood Is You"	3:17
4.	"World Weary"	3:07
5.	"When Lights Are Low"	2:56
6.	"Fools Fall in Love"	3:17
7.	"I Got a Right to Sing the Blues"	3:39
8.	"Baby Plays Around"	3:29
9.	"The Very Thought of You"	4:54
10.	"What I Was Warned About"	2:52
11.	"Baby, Don't You Quit Now"	3:00
12.	"No Love, No Nothing"	3:44
13.	"Not Exactly Paris"	3:15
14.	"Any Place I Hang My Hat Is Home"	2:49
15.	"I Keep Going Back to Joe's"	3:23
16.	"We'll Be Together Again"	3:45
Total length:		52:25
