= Richard Rodney Bennett =

English composer and pianist (1936–2012)

Sir Richard Rodney Bennett CBE

Background information
- Born: 29 March 1936; Broadstairs, Kent, England
- Died: 24 December 2012 (aged 76) New York City, US
- Genres: Classical music; film music; jazz
- Occupation: Composer
- Instruments: Piano; vocals
- Years active: 1954–2012

Sir Richard Rodney Bennett CBE (29 March 1936 – 24 December 2012) was an English composer and pianist. He was noted for his musical versatility, drawing from such sources as jazz, romanticism, and avant-garde; and for his use of twelve-tone technique and serialism. His body of work included over 200 concert works and 50 scores for film and television. He was also active in jazz, as a composer, a pianist, and an occasional vocalist.

For his scoring work, Bennett was nominated for a total of 10 BAFTA Awards, winning once for Best Original Music for the film Murder on the Orient Express (1974). He was also nominated for three Academy Awards (Far from the Madding Crowd, 1967; Nicholas and Alexandra, 1971; and Murder on the Orient Express) and three Grammy Awards, among other accolades. He was the International Chair of Composition of the Royal Academy of Music, and was knighted in 1998.

== Life and career ==
Bennett was born at Broadstairs, Kent, but was raised in Devon during World War II. His mother, Joan Esther, née Spink (1901–1983) was a pianist who had trained with Gustav Holst. His father, Rodney Bennett (1890–1948), was a children's book author, poet and lyricist, who worked with Roger Quilter on his theatre works and provided new words for some of the numbers in the Arnold Book of Old Songs.

Bennett was a pupil at Leighton Park School. He later studied at the Royal Academy of Music with Howard Ferguson and Lennox Berkeley. Ferguson regarded him as extraordinarily brilliant, having perhaps the greatest talent of any British composer in his generation, though lacking in a personal style. During this time, Bennett attended some of the Darmstadt summer courses in 1955, where he was exposed to serialism. He later spent two years in Paris as a student of the prominent serialist Pierre Boulez between 1957 and 1959. He always used both his first names after finding another Richard Bennett active in music.

Bennett taught at the Royal Academy of Music between 1963 and 1965, at the Peabody Institute in Baltimore, United States from 1970 to 1971, and was later International Chair of Composition at the Royal Academy of Music between 1994 and the year 2000. He was appointed a Commander of the Order of the British Empire (CBE) in 1977, and was knighted in 1998.

Bennett produced over 200 works for the concert hall, and 50 scores for film and television. He was also a writer and performer of jazz songs for 50 years. Immersed in the techniques of the European avant-garde via his contact with Boulez, Bennett subsequently developed his own dramato-abstract style. In his later years, he adopted an increasingly tonal idiom.

Bennett regularly performed as a jazz pianist, with such singers as Cleo Laine, Marion Montgomery (until her death in 2002), Mary Cleere Haran (until her death in 2011), and more recently with Claire Martin, performing the Great American Songbook. Bennett and Martin performed at such venues as The Oak Room at the Algonquin Hotel in New York, and The Pheasantry and Ronnie Scott's Jazz Club in London.

In later years, in addition to his musical activities, Bennett became known as an artist working in the medium of collage. He exhibited these collages several times in England, including at the Holt Festival, Norfolk in 2011, and at the Swaledale Festival, Yorkshire, in 2012. The first exhibition of his collages was in London in 2010, at the South Kensington and Chelsea Mental Health Centre, curated by the Nightingale Project, a charity that takes music and art into hospitals. Bennett was a patron of this charity. Bennett is honoured with four photographic portraits in the collection of the National Portrait Gallery, London.

Bennett was gay and in 1995 Gay Times nominated him as one of the most influential gay people in music. He was based in New York City from 1979 until his death there in 2012.

Anthony Meredith's biography of Bennett was published in November 2010. Bennett is survived by his sister Meg (born 1930), the poet M. R. Peacocke, with whom he collaborated on a number of vocal works.

Bennett's cremated remains are buried in Section 112, Plot 45456 at Green-wood Cemetery, Brooklyn. His grave is marked by a grey granite headstone.

== Music ==
Despite his early studies in modernist techniques, Bennett's tastes were eclectic. He wrote in a wide range of styles, including jazz, for which he had a particular fondness. Early on, he began to write music for feature films. He said that it was as if the different styles of music that he was writing went on 'in different rooms, albeit in the same house'. Later in his career the different aspects all became equally celebrated – for example in his 75th birthday year (2011), there were numerous concerts featuring all the different strands of his work. At the BBC Proms for example his Murder on the Orient Express Suite was performed in a concert of film music, and in the same season his Dream Dancing and Jazz Calendar were also featured. Also at the Wigmore Hall, London, on 23 March 2011 (a few days before his 75th birthday), a double concert took place in which his Debussy-inspired piece Sonata After Syrinx was performed in the first concert, and in the Late Night Jazz Event which followed, Bennett and Claire Martin performed his arrangements of the Great American Songbook (Cole Porter, George Gershwin, Rodgers and Hart and so on). See also Tom Service's appreciation of Bennett's music published in The Guardian in July 2012.

== Film and television scores ==
He wrote music for films and television; among his scores were the Doctor Who story The Aztecs (1964) for television, and the feature films Billion Dollar Brain (1967), Lady Caroline Lamb (1972) and Equus (1977). His scores for Far from the Madding Crowd (1967), Nicholas and Alexandra (1971), and Murder on the Orient Express (1974), each earned him Academy Award nominations, with Murder on the Orient Express gaining a BAFTA award. Later works include Enchanted April (1992), Four Weddings and a Funeral (1994), The Tale of Sweeney Todd (1999) and Gormenghast (2000). He was also a prolific composer of orchestral works, piano solos, choral works and operas. Despite this eclecticism, Bennett's music rarely involved stylistic crossover.

== Selected works ==
=== Orchestral works ===
- Aubade (1964)
- Farnham Festival Overture (1964)
- Symphony No. 1 (1965)
- Piano Concerto (1968)
- Symphony No. 2 in one movement (1968) - commissioned by the New York Philharmonic Orchestra
- Party Piece (1971)
- Concerto for Orchestra (1973)
- Viola Concerto (1973) - commissioned by the Northern Sinfonia for Roger Best
- Violin Concerto (1975)
- Zodiac (1975-76)
- Serenade for small orchestra (1976)
- Music for Strings (1977)
- Sonnets to Orpheus for cello and orchestra (1978-79)
- Harpsichord Concerto (1980) - premiere conducted by Leonard Slatkin. St. Louis Symphony Orchestra. Richard Rodney Bennett, harpsichord
- Anniversaries (1982)
- Sinfonietta (1984)
- A Little Suite for chamber orchestra (1986) - based on selections from the song cycles The Insect World and The Aviary
- Symphony No. 3 (1987)
- Saxophone Concerto (1988) for alto saxophone
- Marimba Concerto (1988)
- Diversions for chamber orchestra (1989)
- Concerto for Stan Getz (1990) - for tenor saxophone, timpani and strings
- Percussion Concerto (1990) - commissioned by and first performed at St Magnus Festival, Orkney, soloist Dame Evelyn Glennie, 1990
- Trumpet Concerto (1993) - for trumpet and wind orchestra
- Partita for orchestra (1995)
- Reflections on a Sixteenth Century Tune (1999) - for string orchestra or double wind quintet
- Troubadour Music (2006)

=== Instrumental and chamber ===
- Sonata (1954) - for piano, first published work
- Fanfare (1962) - for brass quintet
- Impromptus (1968) - for guitar
- Scena II (1973) - for solo cello; commissioned by the Music Department of the University College of North Wales, Bangor, with funds from Welsh Arts Council, first performed by Judith Mitchell 25 April 1974
- Sonatina (1981) - for solo clarinet
- After Syrinx I (1982) - for oboe and piano
- Summer Music (1982) - for flute and piano
- Sonata (1983) - for solo guitar
- After Syrinx II (1984) - for solo marimba
- Morning Music (1986) - for wind band
- Over the Hills and Far Away (1991) - for piano 4 hands
- The Four Seasons (1991) - for symphonic wind ensemble
- Dream Sequence (1992) - for cello and piano, first performed in December 1994 at the Wigmore Hall, London by Julian Lloyd Webber and John Lenehan (1992)
- Ballad in Memory of Shirley Horn (2006) - For clarinet and piano, written the year after her death to commemorate her
- Lilliburlero Variations (2008) - for two pianos, commissioned by the Dranoff 2 Piano Foundation in Miami

=== Operas ===
- The Ledge (1961) - libretto by Adrian Mitchell
- The Midnight Thief (1964) - libretto by Ian Serraillier
- The Mines of Sulphur (1965) - libretto by Beverley Cross
- A Penny for a Song (1967)
- All the King's Men (1968) - libretto by Beverley Cross
- Victory (1970) - libretto by Beverley Cross

=== Ballet ===
- Jazz Calendar (1968)
- Isadora (1981)

=== Choral and vocal works ===
- Tom o' Bedlam's Song (1961) - voice and cello
- Two Madrigals: 1. Still to be neat, 2. The hour-glass (1961) – text by Ben Jonson
- The Aviary, song cycle (1966)
- The Insect World, song cycle (1966)
- Soliloquy (1967) - voice and jazz ensemble, text Julian Mitchell, written for Cleo Laine
- Five Carols: There is No Rose, Out of Your Sleep, That Younge Child, Sweet was the Song, Susanni (1967) - written for St Matthew's Church Northampton
- Spells (1974) - written for soprano Jane Manning
- Sea Change (1983)
- Nonsense (1984) - chorus and piano duet, a setting of the seven poems by Mervyn Peake
- Missa Brevis (1990)
- Partridge Pie (1990) for chorus and piano (based on The Twelve Days of Christmas)
- On Christmas Day to My Heart, (1998) - written for the Festival of Nine Lessons and Carols at King's College Chapel, Cambridge in 1999.
- A Good-Night (1999)
- The Glory and the Dream (2000), chorus a cappella and 1 instrument, text Wordsworth
- A Farewell to Arms (2001)
- The Garden – A Serenade to Glimmerglass (2006) - commissioned by Nicholas Russell for Glimmerglass Opera in honour of Stewart Robertson for its Young American Artists Program
- A History of the Thé Dansant for mezzo-soprano and small orchestra (2011)

== Recordings ==
=== Albums ===
Solo:

- Lush Life (1988) - Ode Records
- I Never Went Away (1992) - Delos
- Harold Arlen's Songs (1994) - Audiophile
- A Different Side of Sondheim (1995) - DRG
- Take Love Easy (2002) - Audiophile
- Richard Rodney Bennett: Words And Music (2007) - Chandos

with Marion Montgomery

- Surprise Surprise (1977)
- Town and Country(1978)
- Puttin' On the Ritz (1984)

with Carol Sloane (singer)

- Love You Madly (1989) - Contemporary

with Chris Connor (singer)

- Classic (1991) - Contemporary
- New Again (1991) - Contemporary

with Mary Cleere Haran (singer)

- This Funny World: Mary Cleere Haran Sings Lyrics By Hart (1995) - Varèse Sarabande
- Pennies From Heaven: Movie Songs From The Depression Era (1998) - Angel Records
- The Memory Of All That: Gershwin On Broadway and In Hollywood (1999) - 2011 reissue
- Crazy Rhythm: Manhattan in the 20s (2002) - Varèse Sarabande

with Claire Martin

- When Lights Are Low (2005)
- Witchcraft (2010)
- Say It Isn't So (2013)

Opera

- The Mines of Sulphur (2005) - Chandos

Orchestral

- Symphony No. 1 (1968) - with works by Bax and Berkeley, Royal Philharmonic Orchestra, Igor Buketoff, RCA
- Jazz Calendar; Piano Concerto (1972) - Stephen Bishop-Kovacevich, London Symphony Orchestra, Alexander Gibson, Philips
- Spells; Aubade (1979) - Jane Manning, Philharmonia Orchestra, David Willcocks, David Atherton, Argo
- Partita; Four Jazz Songs; Enchanted April Suite (1995) - Britten Sinfonia, Nicholas Cleobury, the composer, Neil Richardson, BBC
- Diversions; Symphony No. 3; Violin Concerto (1996) - Monte Carlo Philharmonic Orchestra, James DePreist, Koch
- Bennett: Orchestral Works, Vol 1 (2017) - Celebration; Marimba Concerto; Symphony No. 3; Summer Music; Sinfonietta. BBC Scottish Symphony Orchestra, John Wilson, Chandos
- Bennett: Orchestral Works, Vol 2 (2018) - Concerto for Stan Getz; Symphony No. 2; Serenade; Partita. BBC Scottish Symphony Orchestra, John Wilson, Chandos
- Bennett: Orchestral Works, Vol 3 (2019) - Symphony No. 1; A History of the Dansant; Reflections on a 16th Century Tune; Zodiac. BBC Scottish Symphony Orchestra, John Wilson, Chandos
- Bennett: Orchestral Works, Vol 4 (2020) - Aubade; Piano Concerto; Anniversaries; Country Dances, Book One, Troubadour Music. BBC Scottish Symphony Orchestra, John Wilson, Chandos
- Bennett: Orchestral Works, Vol 5 (2025) - Concerto for Orchestra; Sonnets to Orpheus, Diversions. BBC Scottish Symphony Orchestra, John Wilson, Chandos

Choral

- Stuff and Nonsense (1999) - Astounding Sounds for London Oriana Choir
- Letters to Lindbergh (2013) - Signum UK
- Sea Change: Choral Music of Richard Rodney Bennett (2013) - The Cambridge Singers, the composer and John Rutter, Collegium Records

== Selected TV and filmography ==
- Pickup Alley (1957)
- Face in the Night (1957)
- The Safecracker (1958)
- Indiscreet (1958)
- The Man Inside (1959)
- The Man Who Could Cheat Death (1959)
- The Angry Hills (1959)
- Chance Meeting (1959)
- The Devil's Disciple (1959)
- The Mark (1961)
- Only Two Can Play (1962)
- Satan Never Sleeps (1962)
- The Wrong Arm of the Law (1963)
- Heavens Above! (1963)
- Billy Liar (1963)
- Hamlet at Elsinore (1964) (TV)
- One Way Pendulum (1964)
- The Wednesday Play (1964–1967) (TV, 3 episodes)
- The Nanny (1965)
- Hereward the Wake (1965)
- The Witches (1966)
- Far from the Madding Crowd (1967) (nominated for Academy Award for Best Original Score)
- Billion Dollar Brain (1967)
- Secret Ceremony (1968)
- The Buttercup Chain (1970)
- Figures in a Landscape (1970)
- Nicholas and Alexandra (1971) (nominated for Academy Award for Best Original Score (Dramatic))
- Lady Caroline Lamb (1973)
- Voices (1973)
- Murder on the Orient Express (1974) (nominated for Academy Award for Best Original Dramatic Score)
- Permission to Kill (1975)
- Sherlock Holmes in New York (1976) (TV)
- The Accuser aka L'Imprécateur (1977)
- Equus (1977)
- The Brink's Job (1978)
- Yanks (1979)
- The Return of the Soldier (1982)
- Knockback (1984) (TV)
- The Ebony Tower (1984) (TV)
- Murder with Mirrors (1985) (TV)
- Tender is the Night (1985) (TV mini-series)
- Poor Little Rich Girl: The Barbara Hutton Story (1987) (TV)
- The Charmer (1987) (TV mini-series)
- American Playhouse (1988) (TV, 1 episode)
- The Attic: The Hiding of Anne Frank (1988) (TV)
- Enchanted April (1991)
- Four Weddings and a Funeral (1994)
- Swann (1996)
- The Tale of Sweeney Todd (1997) (TV)
- Gormenghast (2000) (TV mini-series)
