= One Big Family EP =

1997 single by Embrace

EP by Embrace
- Released: 7 July 1997
- Length: 4:01 ("One Big Family")
- Label: Hut
- Producer: Embrace, Dave Creffield

Embrace chronology
Fireworks EP (1997)	One Big Family EP (1997)	All You Good Good People EP (1997)

One Big Family EP is a four-track extended play (EP) by English band Embrace from their debut album, The Good Will Out (1998). Released on 7 July 1997, and with the song "One Big Family" as the lead track, the EP narrowly missed the top 20 in the United Kingdom, peaking at number 21. "One Big Family" is sung by guitarist Richard McNamara rather than Embrace's usual singer, his brother Danny. In 2011, English artist Templecloud released a cover of the song that reached number 24 on the UK Singles Chart.

The songs "Dry Kids" and "Butter Wouldn't Melt" are on the B-sides compilation, Dry Kids: B-Sides 1997-2005. The B-side "Dry Kids" gave the name to the collection.

== Track listing ==
All tracks are written by Danny McNamara and Richard McNamara

UK CD, 12-inch, and cassette EP
No.	Title	Lead vocals	Length
1.	"One Big Family"	Richard McNamara	4:01
2.	"Dry Kids"	Danny McNamara	2:45
3.	"You've Only Got to Stop to Get Better"	Danny McNamara	4:47
4.	"Butter Wouldn't Melt"	Danny McNamara	3:22

== Charts ==
Chart (1997)	Peak position
Scotland (OCC)	22
UK Singles (OCC)	21

== Templecloud version ==
"One Big Family"

Single by Templecloud

from the album Over It
- Released: 24 May 2011
- Genre: Pop
- Length: 3:11
- Label: Polydor Records
- Songwriter(s): Danny McNamara and Richard McNamara

English artist Templecloud released a cover version of the song, featuring vocals by English singer Hannah Symons. The single was released in the United Kingdom on 24 May 2011 as a digital download. On 29 May 2011 the song entered the UK Singles Chart at number 24.

=== Music video ===
The music video for the song was uploaded to YouTube on 24 May 2011.

=== Track listing ===
No.	Title	Length
1.	"One Big Family"	3:11

=== Charts ===
Chart (2011)	Peak position
Scotland (OCC)	23
UK Singles (OCC)	24

=== Release history ===
Country	Date	Format	Label
United Kingdom	24 May 2011	Digital download	Polydor Records
