= Ian Shaw (singer) =

British jazz singer, broadcaster and comedian

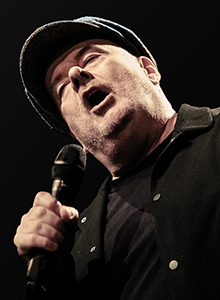
- Ian Shaw in Saarbrücken, Germany, October 2023

Background information
- Born: 2 June 1962 (age 64); St. Asaph, Wales
- Genre: Jazz
- Occupations: Singer, broadcaster, producer, comedian
- Instruments: Vocals, piano
- Years active: 1982-present
- Website: www.ianshaw.biz

Ian Shaw (born 2 June 1962) is a British jazz singer, broadcaster, record producer, actor and comedian.

Shaw was born in St. Asaph, Wales. At eighteen he moved to London where he studied music at King's College London. His career in performance began in the 1980s working in piano bars in the UK and abroad, both solo and as a duo with composer Andrew Phillips (guitar). On the alternative cabaret circuit, he appeared alongside such performers as Julian Clary, Rory Bremner, and Jo Brand.

Shaw co-founded the band Brave New World with Adrian York, touring with them and playing at venues that included Hammersmith Odeon and Ronnie Scott’s Jazz Club. He recorded his first album Lazy Blue Eyes (1990), a collaboration with fellow singer Carol Grimes. By the mid-1990s, he was regularly performing at the Ronnie Scott's Jazz Club and he released three albums on the club's Jazz House label: Ghostsongs (1992), a tribute to Richard Rodgers and Lorenz Hart titled Taking It to Hart (1995), and The Echo of a Song (1996). In 1996, Shaw led his own Very Big Band on a UK tour, and by the late 1990s he was performing regularly in the US. In 1999, he released In a New York Minute, the first of two albums on the US label Milestone Records. This and Soho Stories, released in 2001, featured American musicians, including Cedar Walton, Lew Soloff, and Eric Alexander. On his next album A World Still Turning (2003), he worked with Billy Childs and Peter Washington, and guest vocalist Mark Murphy.

His 2006 album on Linn Records saw Shaw paying tribute to songwriter Joni Mitchell. Drawn to All Things: The Songs of Joni Mitchell was followed in 2008 by an autobiographical album, Lifejacket, which showcased his songwriting for the first time, in collaboration with the guitarist David Preston. Somewhere Towards Love from 2009 was an intimate album of voice and piano released by Splash Point Records. The title song, written by Shaw, was chosen by Molly Parkin as one of her Desert Island Discs. In 2011, he recorded The Abbey Road Sessions with a band that included bass player Peter Ind.

Shaw was a close friend of lyricist and poet Fran Landesman and following her death he recorded A Ghost In Every Bar (2012), a collection of songs with lyrics by Landesman, also on Splash Point Records. His next two albums were on the French Jazz Village label: The Theory of Joy (2016) and Shine Sister Shine (2018), both with piano trio led by Barry Green. These were followed by two collaborations with pianist and songwriter Jamie Safir, both on Silent Wish Records: What's New (2020) which also featured saxophonist Iain Ballamy and Greek Street Friday (2023) which consisted of original tracks with biographical lyrics written by Shaw, performed by a full band. An Adventurous Dream (2024) was a collaboration with saxophonist Tony Kofi, featuring the music of Billy Strayhorn and Duke Ellington. On his most recent album, Stephensong – Ian Shaw Sings Stephen Sondheim (2025), Shaw was partnered by pianist Barry Green.

On radio, Shaw presented the weekly BBC Radio 2 programme Big Band Special in 2004. Since 2012 he has presented the Ronnie Scott’s Radio Show, broadcast in the UK on JazzFM and syndicated to the US (Jazz90.1 and Jazz88.FM) and Canada (Jazz.FM91). He has also written and presented three series of his own podcast, Not Even Music.

Among notable appearances, he hosted the BBC Jazz Awards with singer Claire Martin in 2004, and the inaugural Jazz FM awards ceremony in 2013. He performed at the opening gala for the London Jazz Festival in 2007, 2014 and 2022. In 2021 he sang in the world premiere of Mark-Anthony Turnage’s Black Milk, written for jazz singer and sixteen players with a text by Paul Celan. The following year he celebrated his birthday with Shaw at 60, a concert at Kings Place with guests including singers Madeline Bell and Elaine Delmar, trumpeter Guy Barker, actor Haydn Gwynne and comedian Julian Clary. In 2025, Shaw returned to Kings Place for the album launch of Stephensong.

Shaw has continued to perform in the UK including regular shows at the Vortex Jazz Club, Ronnie Scott's Jazz Club, 606 Club and PizzaExpress Jazz Club. Music festival appearances have included Cheltenham and London Jazz Festivals, North Sea Jazz Festival (Rotterdam) in 2014, Toronto Jazz Festival in 2014 and Love Supreme Jazz Festival 2018. He has also continued to perform worldwide with regular appearances in Germany and Canada.

He has won the BBC Jazz Award in the Best Jazz Vocalist category (2004 and 2007), and Best Jazz Vocalist at the Parliamentary Jazz Awards (2018).

== Acting ==
As an actor, Shaw performed in Jerry Springer: The Opera during its run at Battersea Arts Centre in 2002 playing Warm-Up Man/Devil, a role which was created for him by Richard Thomas. Shaw appeared as Percy in the 2005 film Pierrepoint and as Eric in the 2013 film Titus. He wrote and performed his comedy show A Bit Of A Mouthful, with dates at the Edinburgh Fringe (The Stand Comedy Club, 2012) and the Adelaide Comedy Festival (2015), the latter at the invitation of Barry Humphries. In Kurt Elling’s jazz musical The Big Blind, he played the villain Tony Bonilla with performances at Lincoln Center’s Rose Theater (2019) and Queen Elizabeth Hall, London (2020).

== Activism ==
Shaw has campaigned in support of refugees, and he worked as a volunteer in the Calais Jungle encampment. He is a patron of Side by Side Refugees which provides humanitarian aid to those fleeing war, poverty and persecution, and since 2020 he has been a patron of Refugee Support. He organised fundraisers, including 2015 events at The Vortex Jazz Club and Phoenix Artist Club and a 2016 event at The 606 Club with guests including Tanita Tikaram. He also released a music video of My Brother, a track from his album The Theory of Joy, to raise money for refugee charities.

== Discography ==
- Lazy Blue Eyes with Carol Grimes (Offbeat, 1990)
- Ghostsongs with Adrian York (Jazz House, 1992)
- Famous Rainy Day (EFZ, 1995)
- Taking It to Hart (Jazz House, 1996)
- The Echo of a Song (Jazz House, 1997)
- In a New York Minute with Cedar Walton (Milestone, 1999)
- Soho Stories (Milestone, 2001)
- A World Still Turning (441 Records, 2003)
- Drawn to All Things: The Songs of Joni Mitchell (Linn, 2006)
- Lifejacket (Linn, 2008)
- Somewhere Towards Love (Splash Point, 2009)
- The Abbey Road Sessions (Splash Point, 2011)
- A Ghost in Every Bar: The Lyrics of Fran Landesman (Splash Point, 2012)
- The Theory of Joy (Jazz Village, 2016)
- Shine Sister Shine (Jazz Village, 2017)
- Integrity (Abeat Records, 2020)
- What's New (Silent Wish Records, 2020)
- Greek Street Friday (Silent Wish Records, 2023)
- An Adventurous Dream – the Music of Billy Strayhorn and Duke Ellington (At Pizza Express Live – In London) (PX Records, 2024)
- Stephensong – Ian Shaw Sings Stephen Sondheim (Silent Wish Records, 2025)
