= Black =

Darkest color

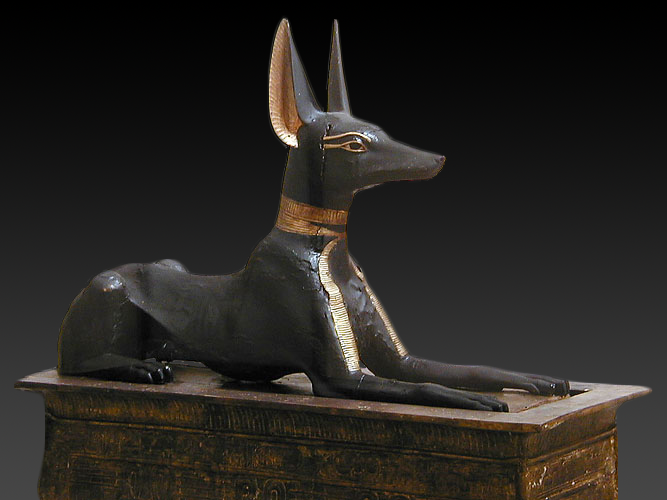
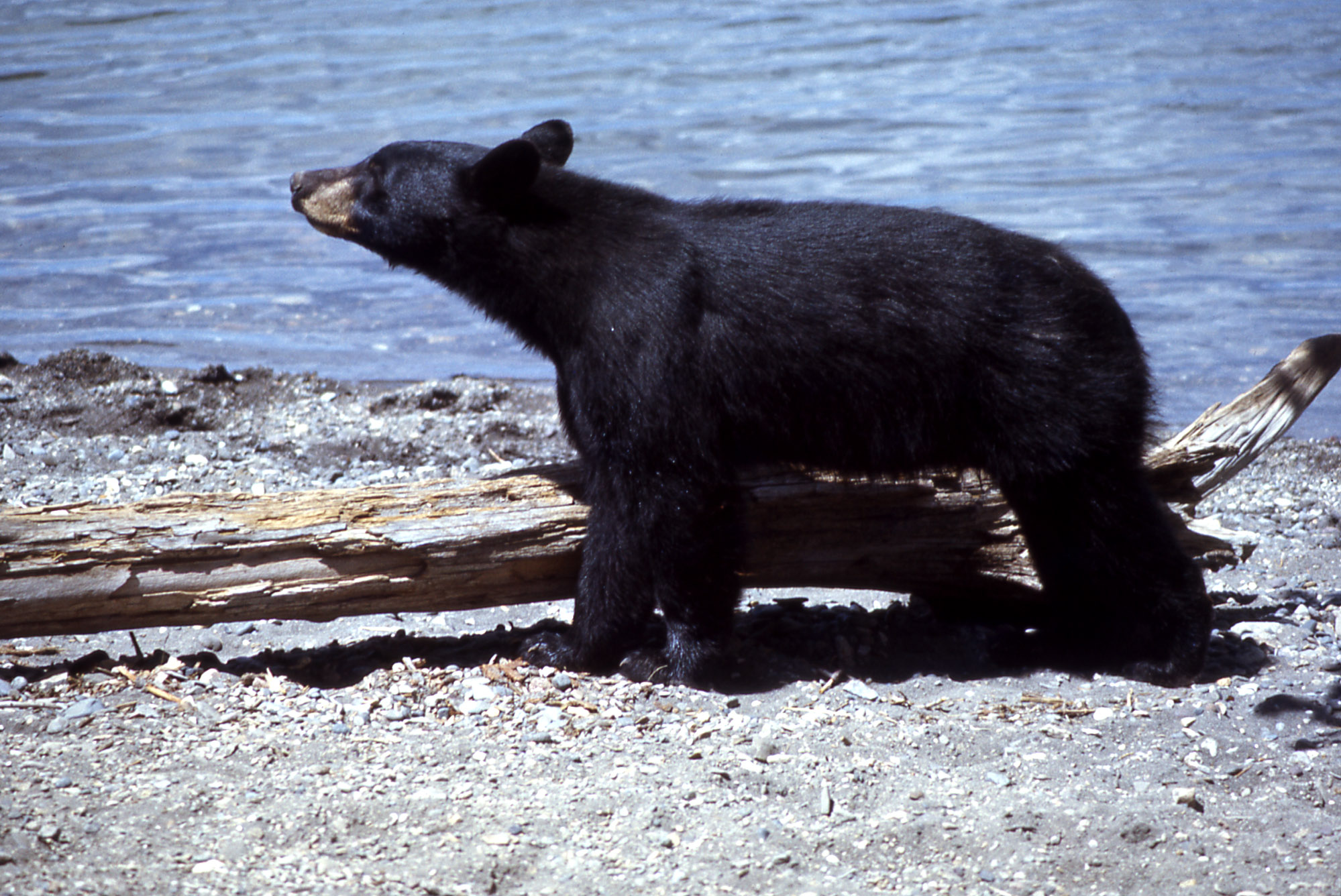
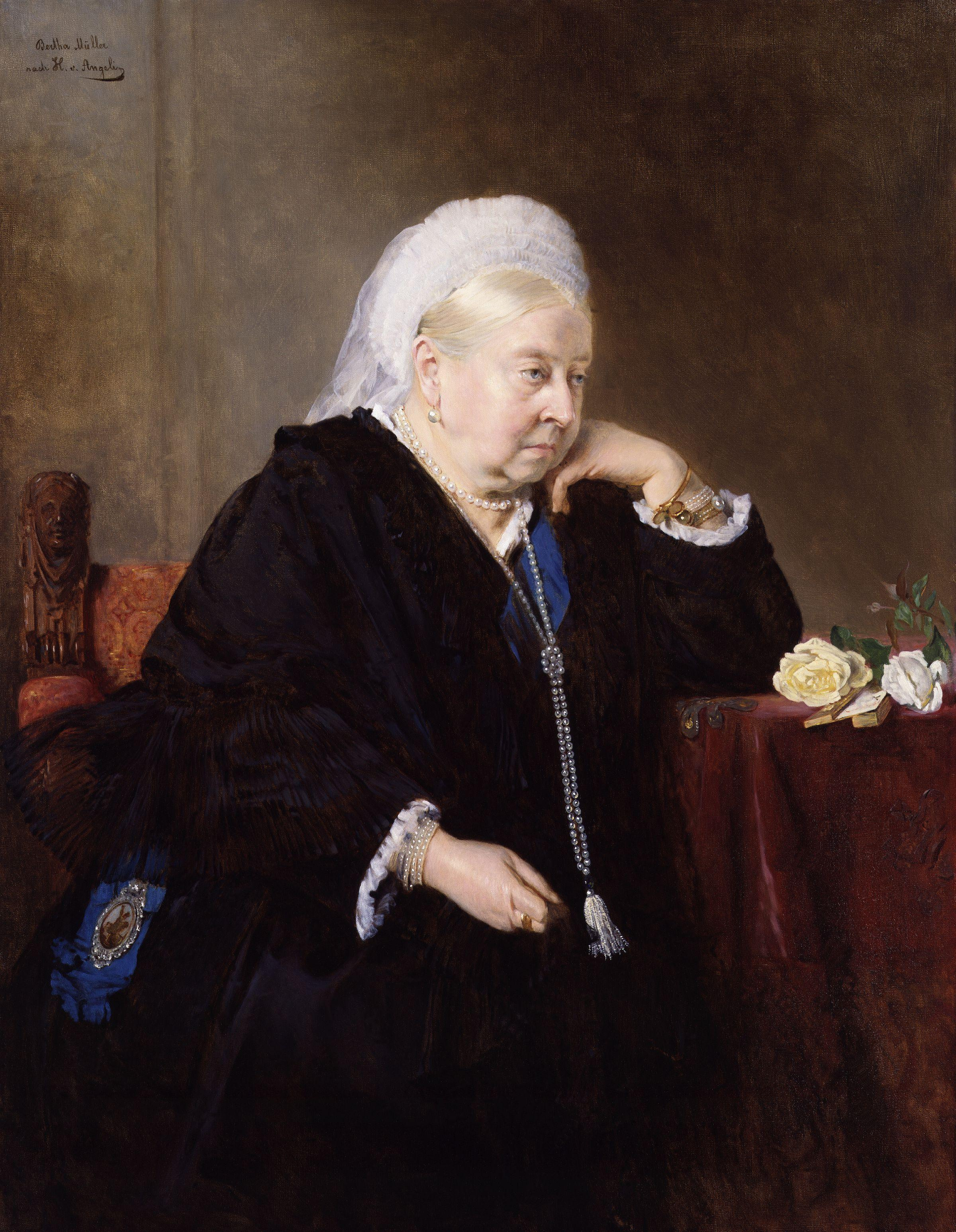
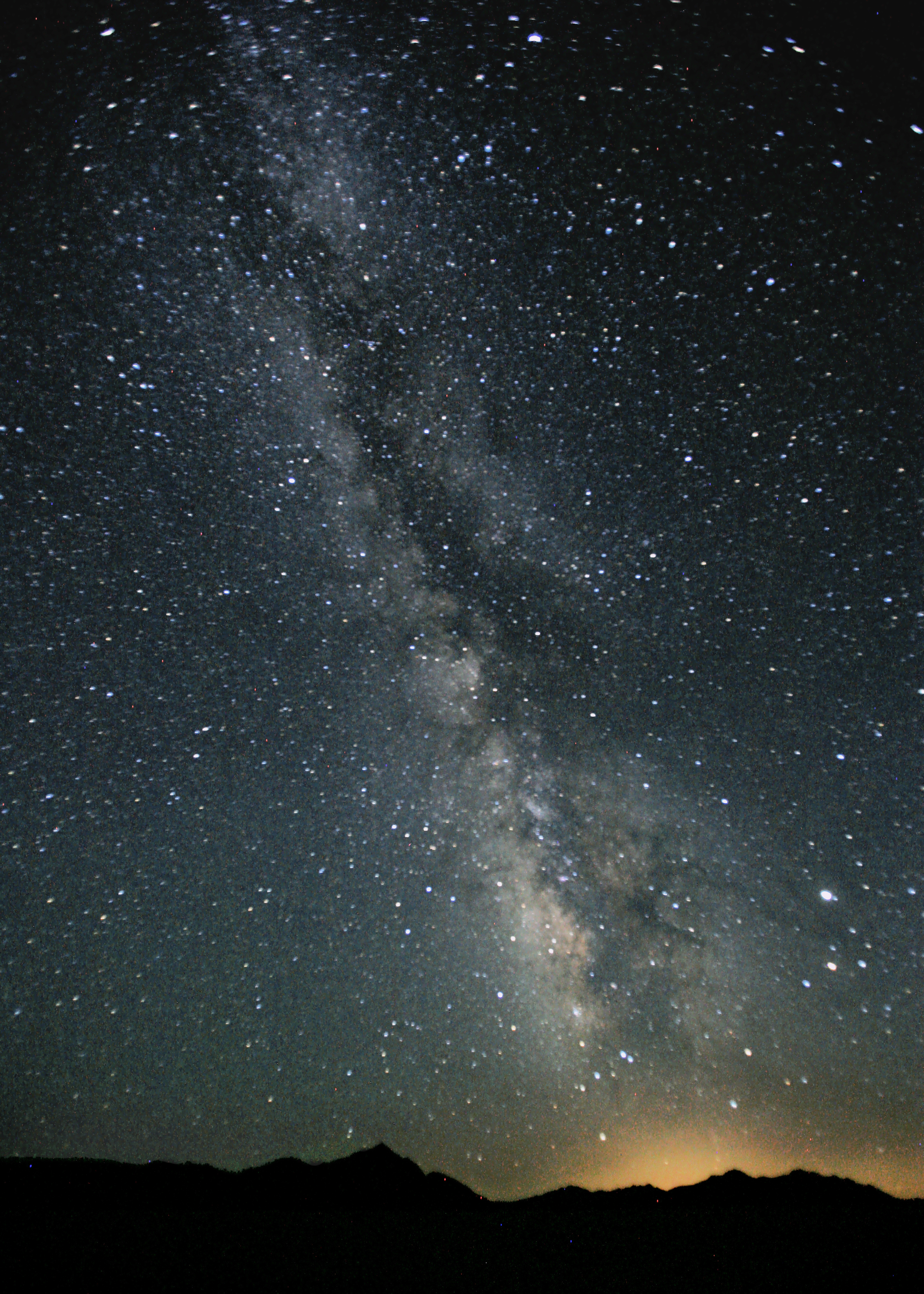
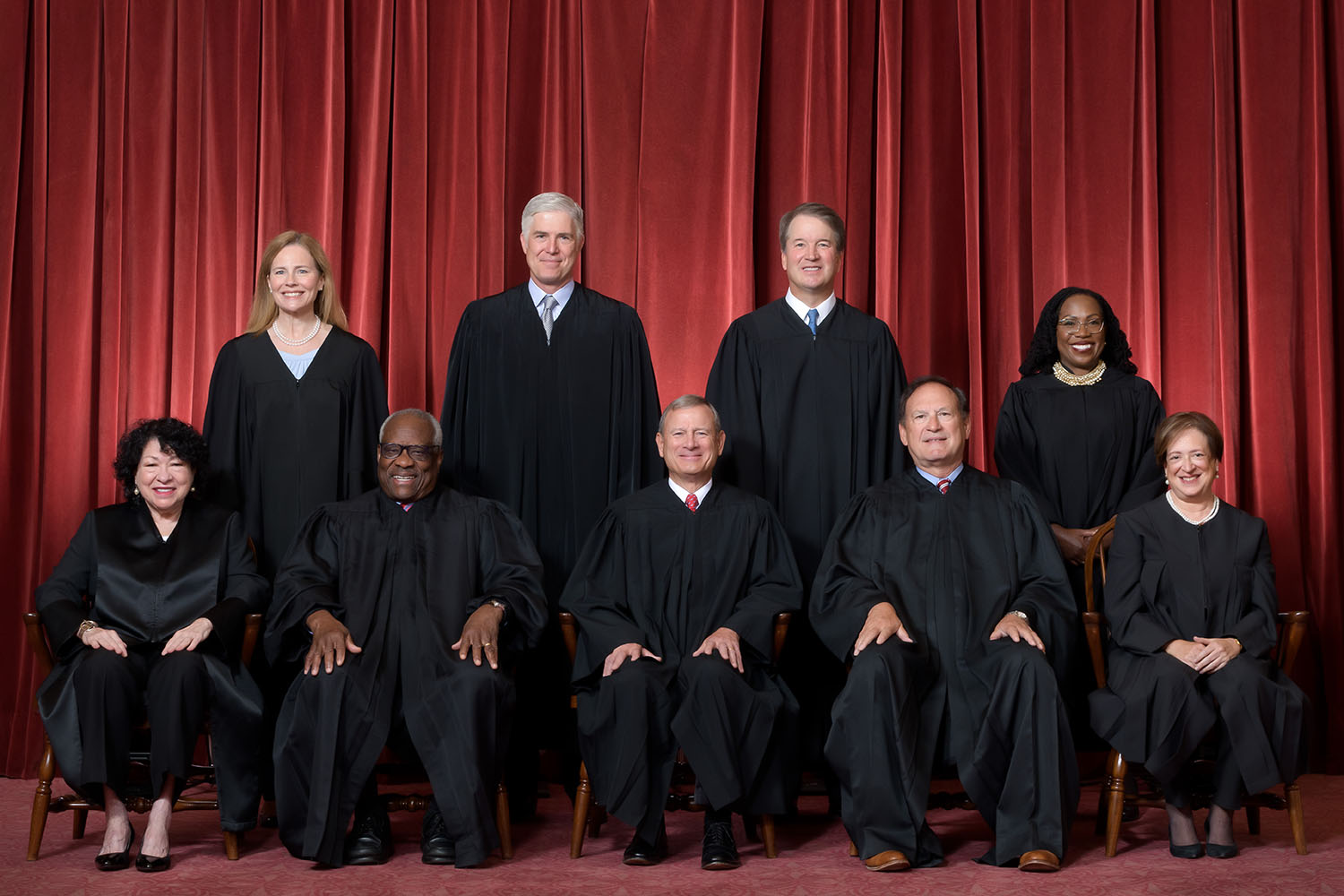
- Clockwise, from top left: Anubis statue; American black bear; Milky Way Galaxy; The Supreme Court of the United States in October 2022; Portrait painting of Queen Victoria.

Color coordinates
- Hex triplet: #000000
- sRGB^{B} (r, g, b): (0, 0, 0)
- HSV (h, s, v): (0°, 0%, 0%)
- CIELCh_{uv} (L, C, h): (0, 0, 0°)
- Source: HTML/CSS
- B: Normalized to [0–255] (byte); H: Normalized to [0–100] (hundred)

Black is a color that results from the absence or complete absorption of visible light. It is an achromatic color, without chroma, like white and grey. It is often used symbolically or figuratively to represent darkness. Black and white have often been used to describe opposites such as good and evil, the Dark Ages versus the Age of Enlightenment, and night versus day. Since the Middle Ages, black has been the symbolic color of solemnity and authority, and for this reason it is still commonly worn by judges and magistrates.

Black was one of the first colors used by artists in Neolithic cave paintings. It was used in ancient Egypt and Greece as the color of the underworld. In the Roman Empire, it became the color of mourning, and over the centuries it was frequently associated with death, evil, witches, and magic. In the 14th century, it was worn by royalty, clergy, judges, and government officials in much of Europe. It became the color worn by English romantic poets, businessmen and statesmen in the 19th century, and a high fashion color in the 20th century. According to surveys in Europe and North America, it is the color most commonly associated with mourning, the end, secrets, magic, force, violence, fear, evil, and elegance.

Black is the most common ink color used for printing books, newspapers and documents, as it provides the highest contrast with white paper and thus is the easiest color to read. Similarly, black text on a white screen is the most common format used on computer screens. As of September 2019, the darkest material is made by MIT engineers from vertically aligned carbon nanotubes.

== Etymology ==
The word black comes from Old English blæc ("black, dark", also, "ink"), from Proto-Germanic *blakkaz ("burned"), from Proto-Indo-European *bhleg- ("to burn, gleam, shine, flash"), from base *bhel- ("to shine"), related to Old Saxon blak ("ink"), Old High German blach ("black"), Old Norse blakkr ("dark"), Dutch blaken ("to burn"), and Swedish bläck ("ink"). More distant cognates include Latin flagrare ("to blaze, glow, burn"), and Ancient Greek phlegein ("to burn, scorch"). The Ancient Greeks sometimes used the same word to name different colors, if they had the same intensity. Kuanos could mean both dark blue and black. The Ancient Romans had two words for black: ater was a flat, dull black, while niger was a brilliant, saturated black. Ater later vanished from the vocabulary, but niger was the source of the English word Negro, and the word for "black" in most modern Romance languages (French: noir; Spanish and Portuguese: negro; Italian: nero; Romanian: negru).

Old High German also had two words for black: swartz for dull black and blach for a luminous black. These are paralleled in Middle English by the terms swart for dull black and blaek for luminous black. Swart still survives as the word swarthy, while blaek became the modern English black. The former is cognate with the words used for black in most modern Germanic languages aside from English (German: schwarz, Dutch: zwart, Swedish: svart, Danish: sort, Icelandic: svartr). In heraldry, the word used for the black color is sable, named for the black fur of the sable, an animal.

== Art ==
=== Prehistoric ===
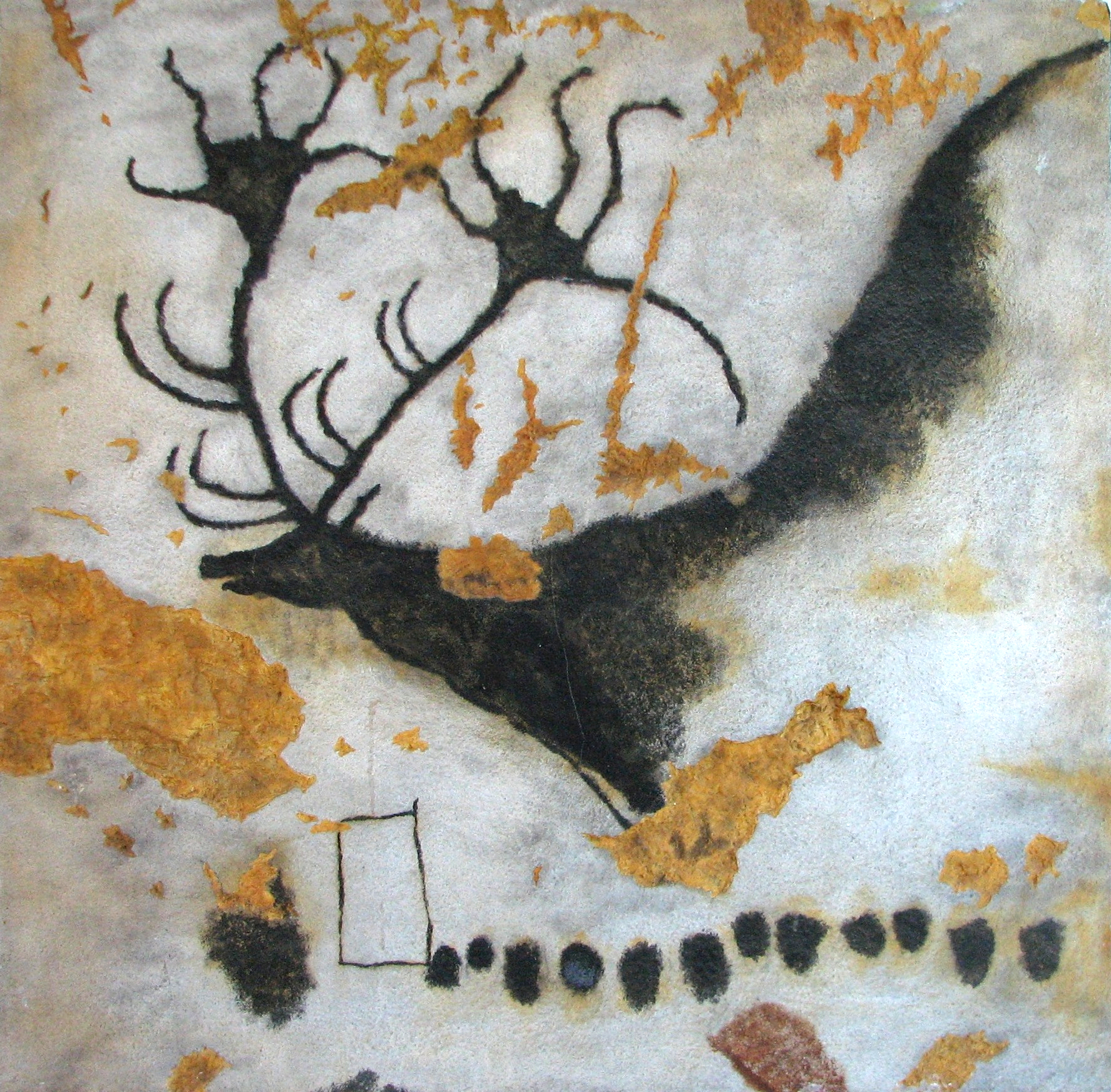
Megaloceros cave art at Lascaux

Black was one of the first colors used in art. The Lascaux Cave in France contains drawings of bulls and other animals drawn by paleolithic artists between 18,000 and 17,000 years ago. They began by using charcoal, and later achieved darker pigments by burning bones or grinding a powder of manganese oxide.

=== Ancient ===
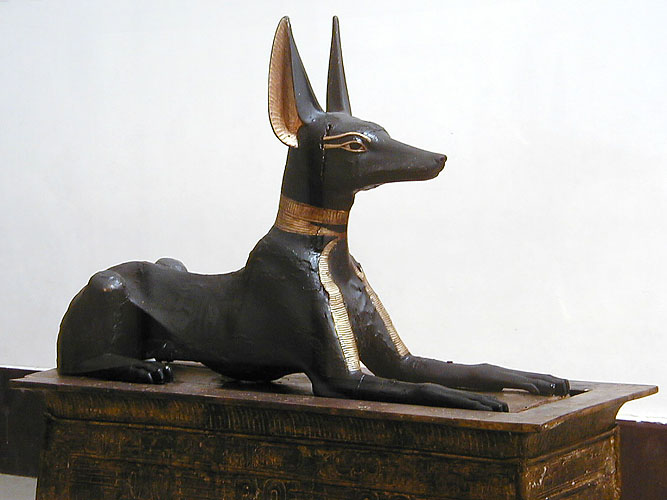
Statue of Anubis, guardian of the underworld, from the tomb of Tutankhamun

For the ancient Egyptians, black had positive associations; being the color of fertility and the rich black soil flooded by the Nile. It was the color of Anubis, the god of the underworld, who took the form of a black jackal, and offered protection against evil to the dead. To ancient Greeks, black represented the underworld, separated from the living by the river Acheron, whose water ran black. Those who had committed the worst sins were sent to Tartarus, the deepest and darkest level. In the center was the palace of Hades, the king of the underworld, where he was seated upon a black ebony throne. Black was one of the most important colors used by ancient Greek artists. In the 6th century BC, they began making black-figure pottery and later red figure pottery, using a highly original technique. In black-figure pottery, the artist would paint figures with a glossy clay slip on a red clay pot. When the pot was fired, the figures painted with the slip would turn black, against a red background. Later they reversed the process, painting the spaces between the figures with slip. This created magnificent red figures against a glossy black background.

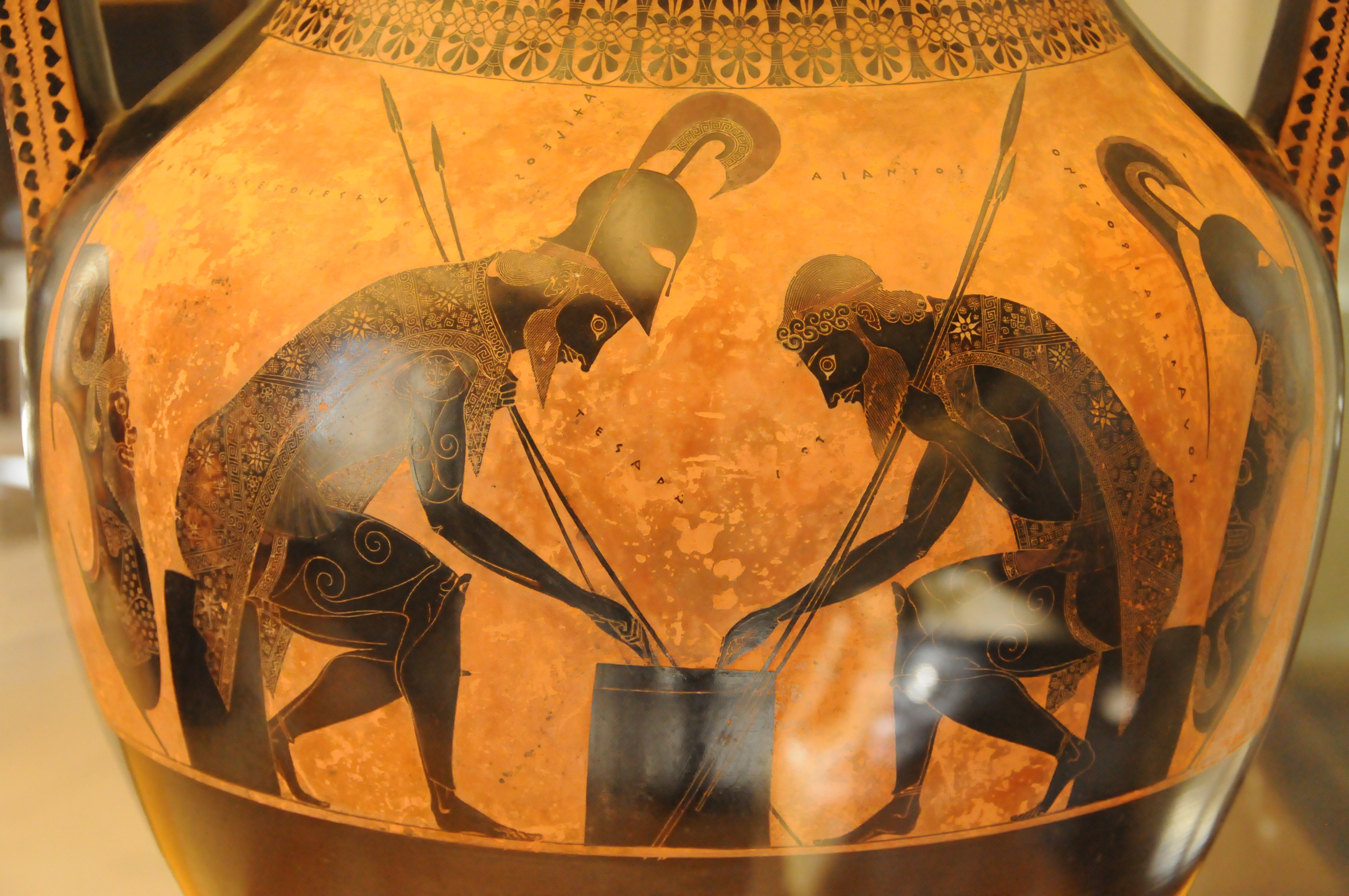
Greek black-figure pottery. Ajax and Achilles playing a game, about 540–530 BC. Vatican Museums

In the social hierarchy of ancient Rome, purple was reserved for the emperor; red was the color worn by soldiers (red cloaks for the officers, red tunics for the soldiers); white the color worn by the priests, and black was worn by craftsmen and artisans. The black they wore was not deep and rich; the vegetable dyes used to make black were not solid or lasting, so the blacks often faded to gray or brown.

In Latin, the word for black, ater and to darken, atere, were associated with cruelty, brutality and evil. They were the root of the English words "atrocious" and "atrocity". For the Romans, black symbolized death and mourning. In the 2nd century BC Roman magistrates wore a dark toga, called a toga pulla, to funeral ceremonies. Later, under the Empire, the family of the deceased also wore dark colors for a long period; then, after a banquet to mark the end of mourning, exchanged the black for a white toga. In Roman poetry, death was called the hora nigra, the black hour.

The German and Scandinavian peoples worshipped their own goddess of the night, Nótt, who crossed the sky in a chariot drawn by a black horse. They also feared Hel, the goddess of the kingdom of the dead, whose skin was black on one side and red on the other. They also held sacred the raven. They believed that Odin, the king of the Nordic pantheon, had two black ravens, Huginn and Muninn, who served as his agents, traveling the world for him, watching and listening.

=== Postclassical ===
In the early Middle Ages, black was commonly associated with darkness and evil. In Medieval paintings, the devil was usually depicted as having human form, but with wings and black skin or hair.

==== 12th and 13th centuries ====
In fashion, black did not have the prestige of red, the color of the nobility. It was worn by Benedictine monks as a sign of humility and penitence. In the 12th century a famous theological dispute broke out between the Cistercian monks, who wore white, and the Benedictines, who wore black. A Benedictine abbot, Pierre the Venerable, accused the Cistercians of excessive pride in wearing white instead of black. Saint Bernard of Clairvaux, the founder of the Cistercians responded that black was the color of the devil, hell, "of death and sin", while white represented "purity, innocence and all the virtues".

Black symbolized both power and secrecy in the medieval world. The emblem of the Holy Roman Empire of Germany was a black eagle. The black knight in the poetry of the Middle Ages was an enigmatic figure, hiding his identity, usually wrapped in secrecy.

Black ink, invented in China, was traditionally used in the Middle Ages for writing, for the simple reason that black was the darkest color and therefore provided the greatest contrast with white paper or parchment, making it the easiest color to read. It became even more important in the 15th century, with the invention of printing. A new kind of ink, printer's ink, was created out of soot, turpentine and walnut oil. The new ink made it possible to spread ideas to a mass audience through printed books, and to popularize art through black and white prints. Because of its contrast and clarity, black ink on white paper continued to be the standard for printing books, newspapers and documents; and for the same reason black text on a white background is the most common format used on computer screens.

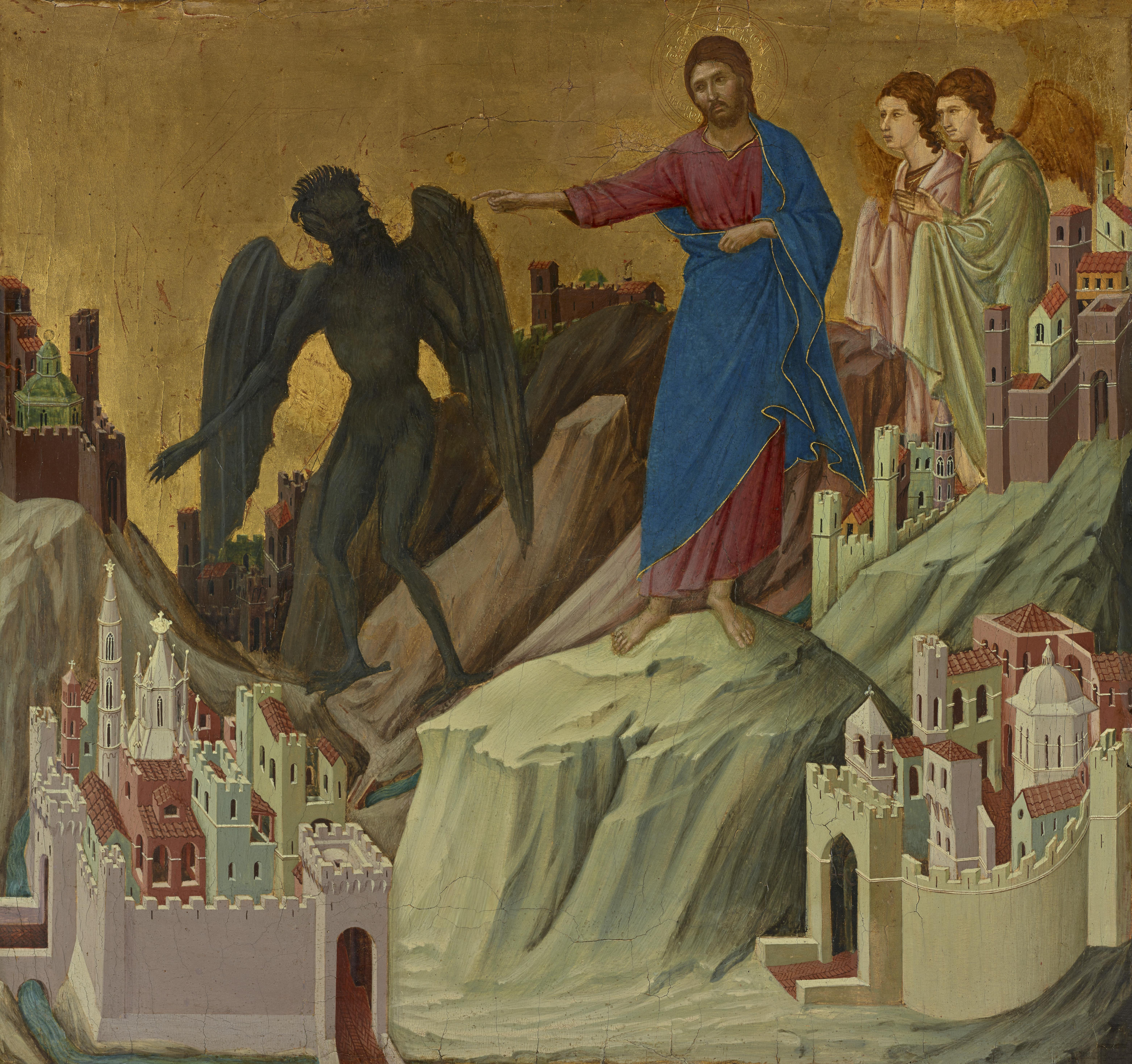
The Italian painter Duccio di Buoninsegna showed Christ expelling the Devil, shown covered with bristly black hair (1308–11).

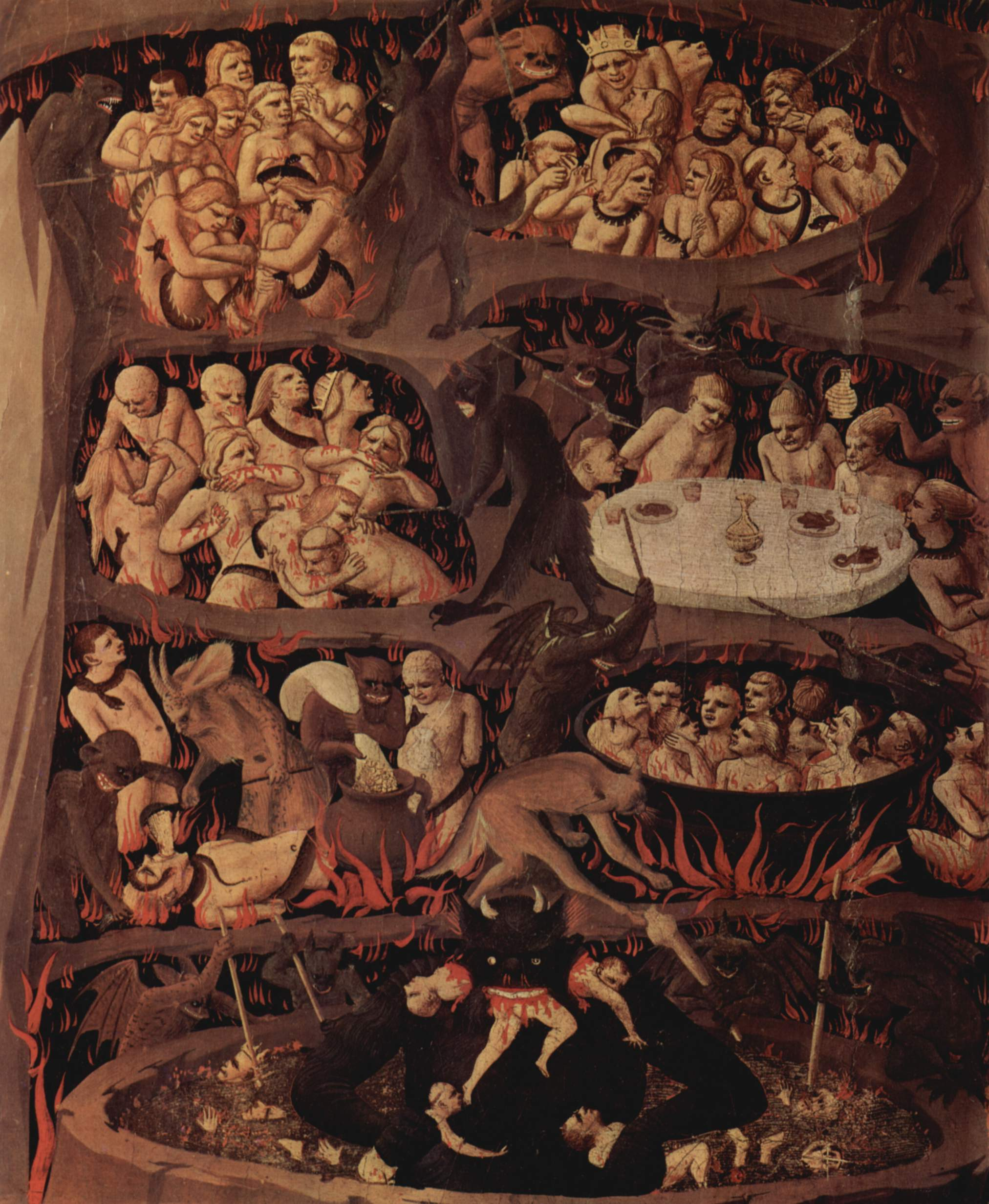
The 15th-century painting of the Last Judgement by Fra Angelico (1395–1455) depicted hell with a vivid black devil devouring sinners.

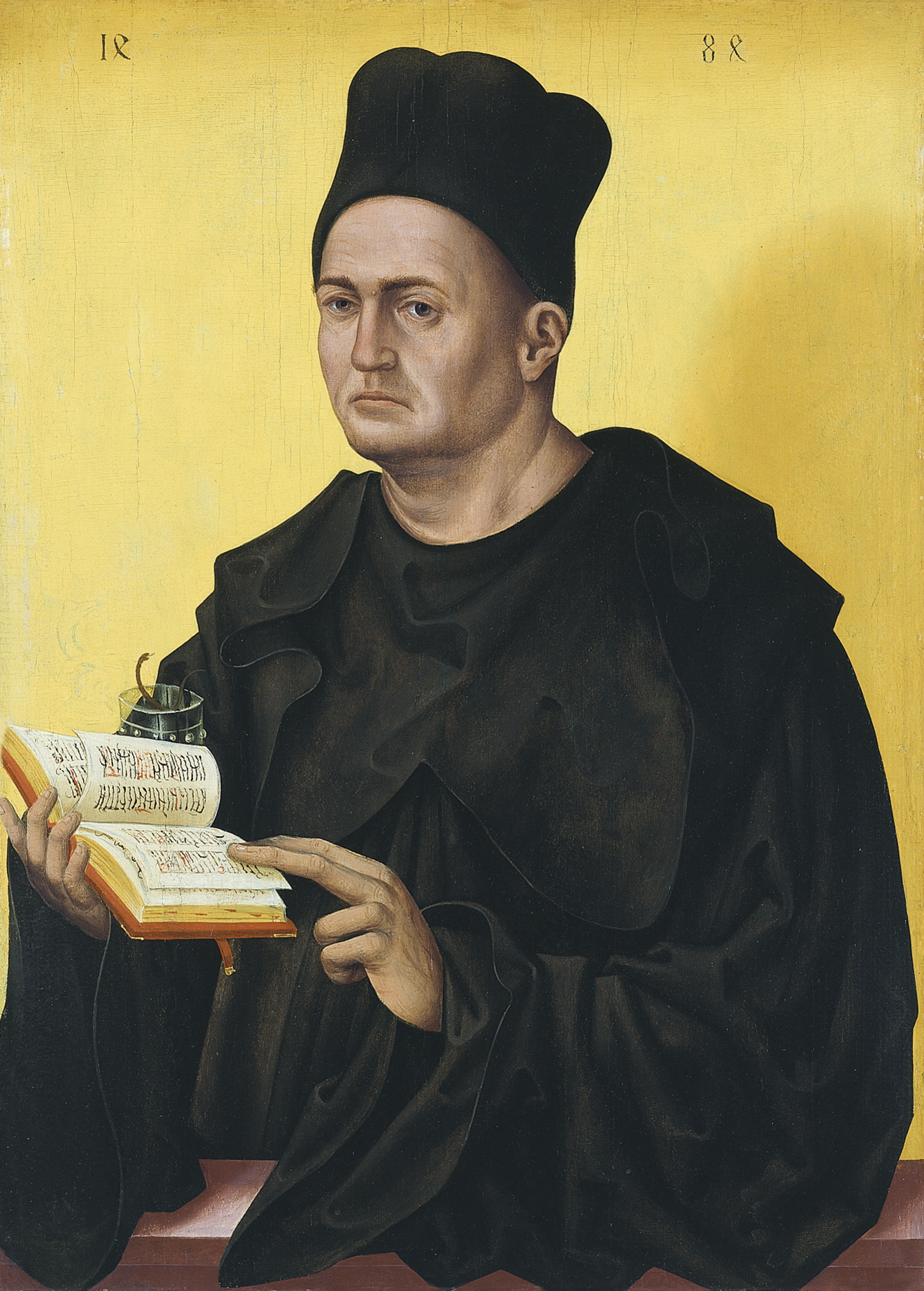
Portrait of a monk of the Benedictine Order (1484)

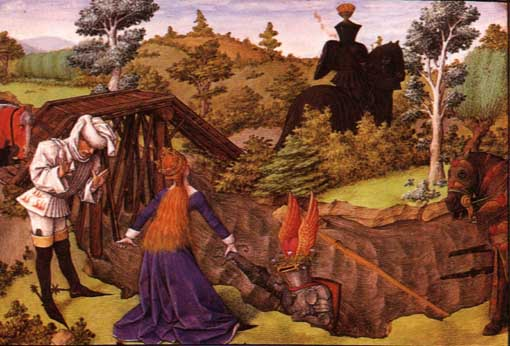
The black knight in a miniature painting of a medieval romance,Le Livre du cœur d'amour épris (about 1460)

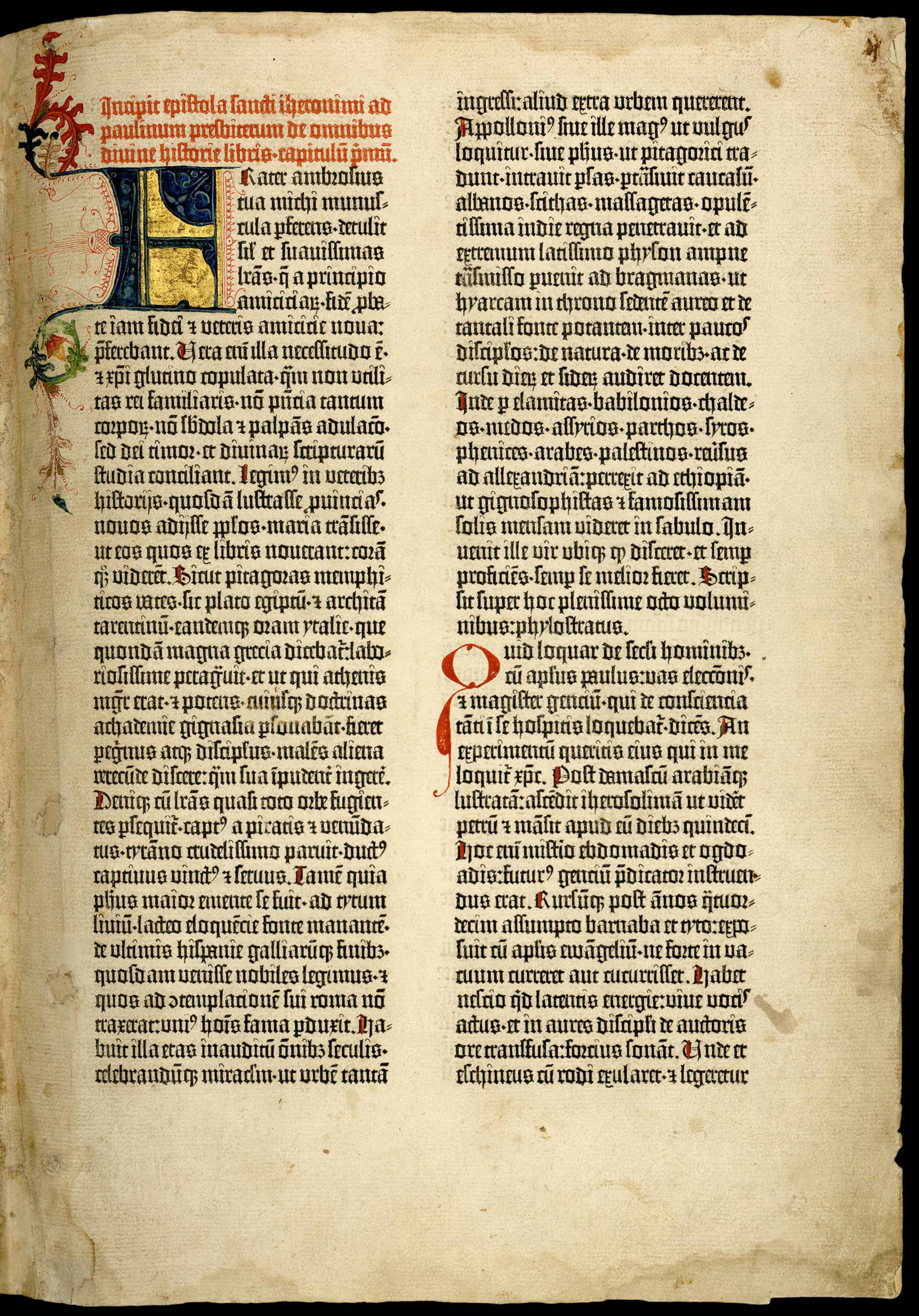
Gutenberg Bible (1451–1452). Black ink was used for printing books, because it provided the greatest contrast with the white paper and was the clearest and easiest color to read.

==== 14th and 15th centuries ====
In the early Middle Ages, princes, nobles and the wealthy usually wore bright colors, particularly scarlet cloaks from Italy. Black was rarely part of the wardrobe of a noble family. The one exception was the fur of the sable. This glossy black fur, from an animal of the marten family, was the finest and most expensive fur in Europe. It was imported from Russia and Poland and used to trim the robes and gowns of royalty.

In the 14th century, the status of black began to change. First, high-quality black dyes began to arrive on the market, allowing garments of a deep, rich black. Magistrates and government officials began to wear black robes, as a sign of the importance and seriousness of their positions. A third reason was the passage of sumptuary laws in some parts of Europe which prohibited the wearing of costly clothes and certain colors by anyone except members of the nobility. The famous bright scarlet cloaks from Venice and the peacock blue fabrics from Florence were restricted to the nobility. The wealthy bankers and merchants of northern Italy responded by changing to black robes and gowns, made with the most expensive fabrics.

The change to the more austere but elegant black was quickly picked up by the kings and nobility. It began in northern Italy, where the Duke of Milan and the Count of Savoy and the rulers of Mantua, Ferrara, Rimini and Urbino began to dress in black. It then spread to France, led by Louis I, Duke of Orleans, younger brother of King Charles VI of France. It moved to England at the end of the reign of King Richard II (1377–1399), where all the court began to wear black. In 1419–20, black became the color of the powerful Duke of Burgundy, Philip the Good. It moved to Spain, where it became the color of the Spanish Habsburgs, of Charles V and of his son, Philip II of Spain (1527–1598). European rulers saw it as the color of power, dignity, humility and temperance. By the end of the 16th century, it was the color worn by almost all the monarchs of Europe and their courts.

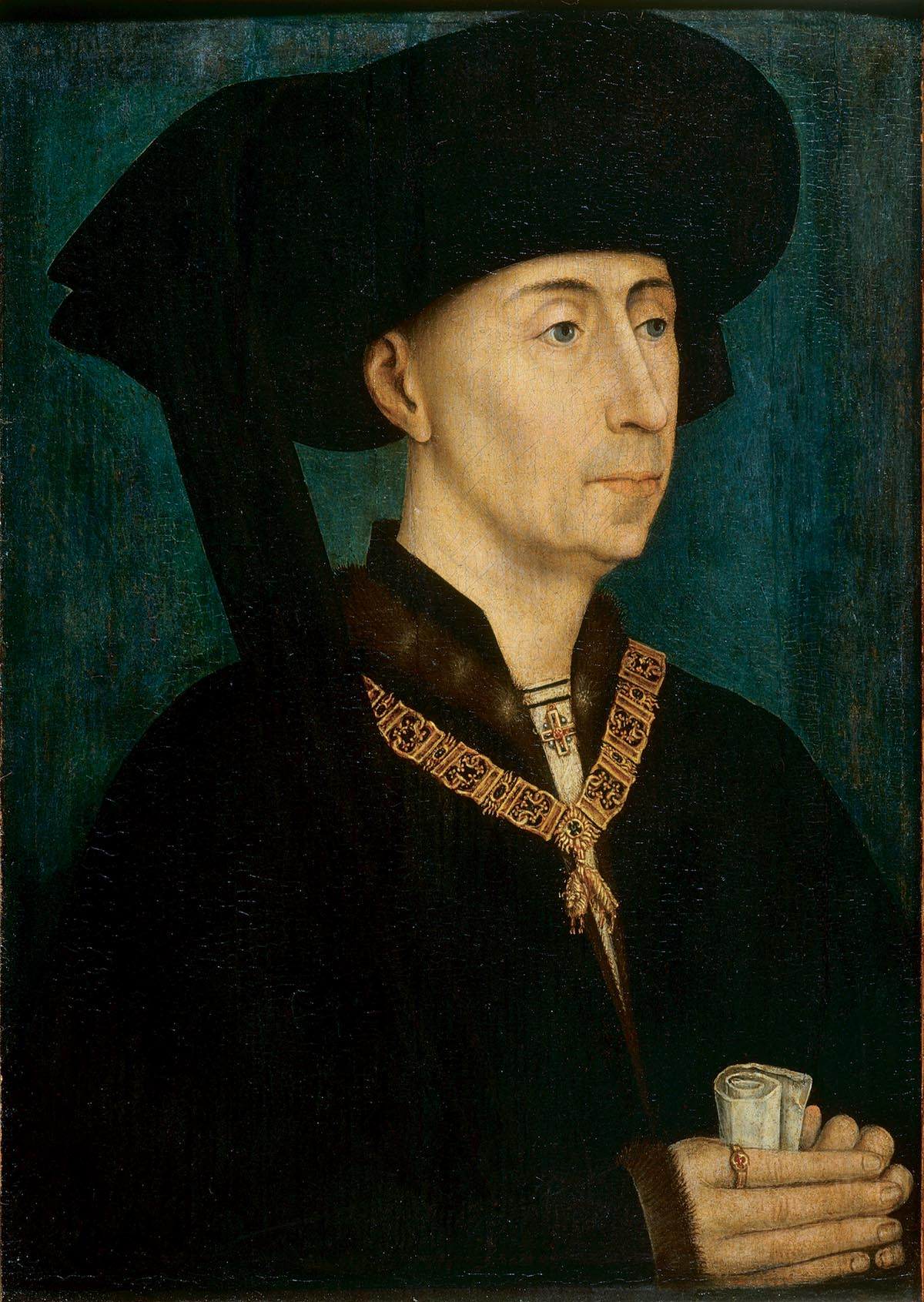
Portrait of Philip the Good, Rogier van der Weyden, c. 1450

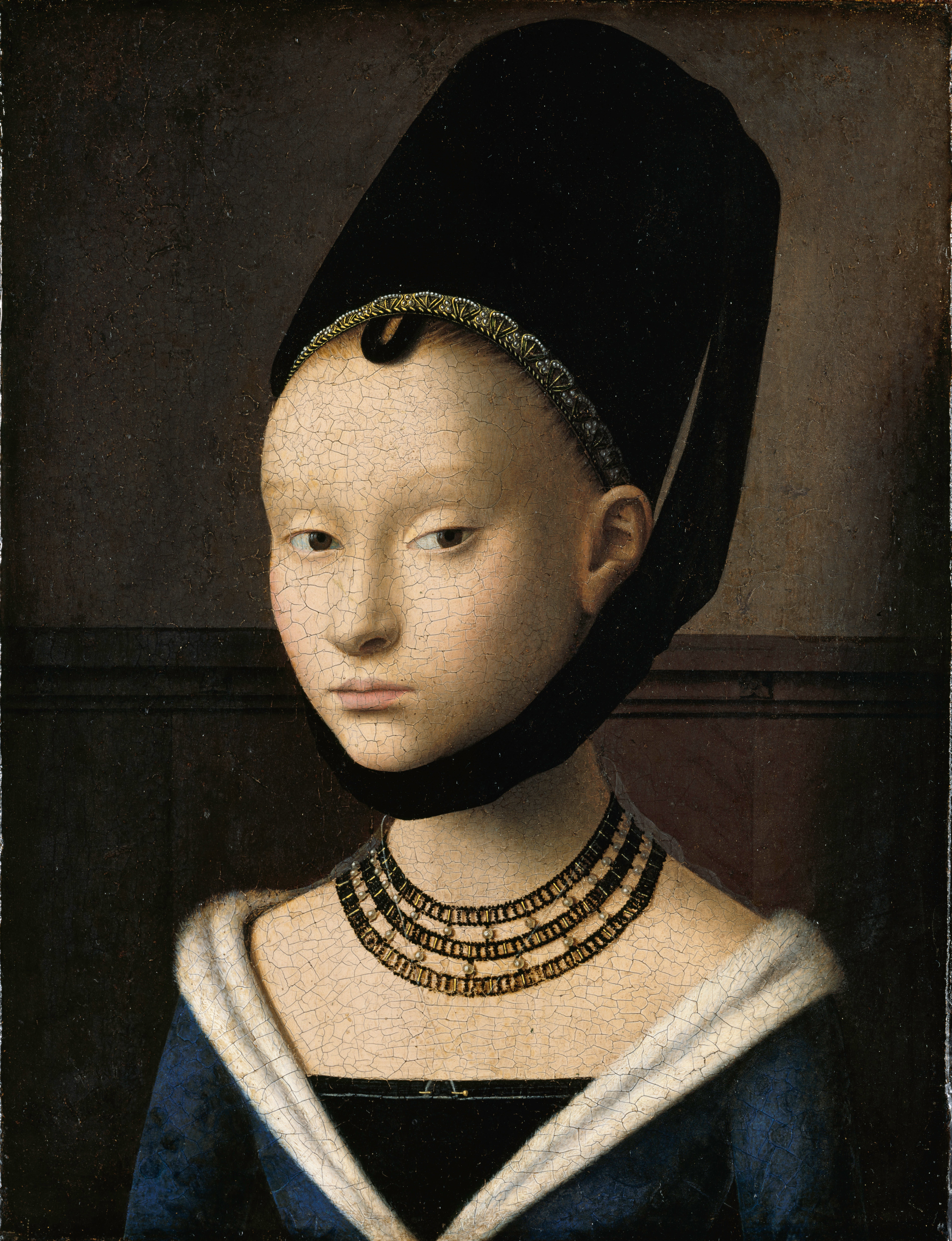
Portrait of a Young Girl, Petrus Christus, between 1465 and 1470

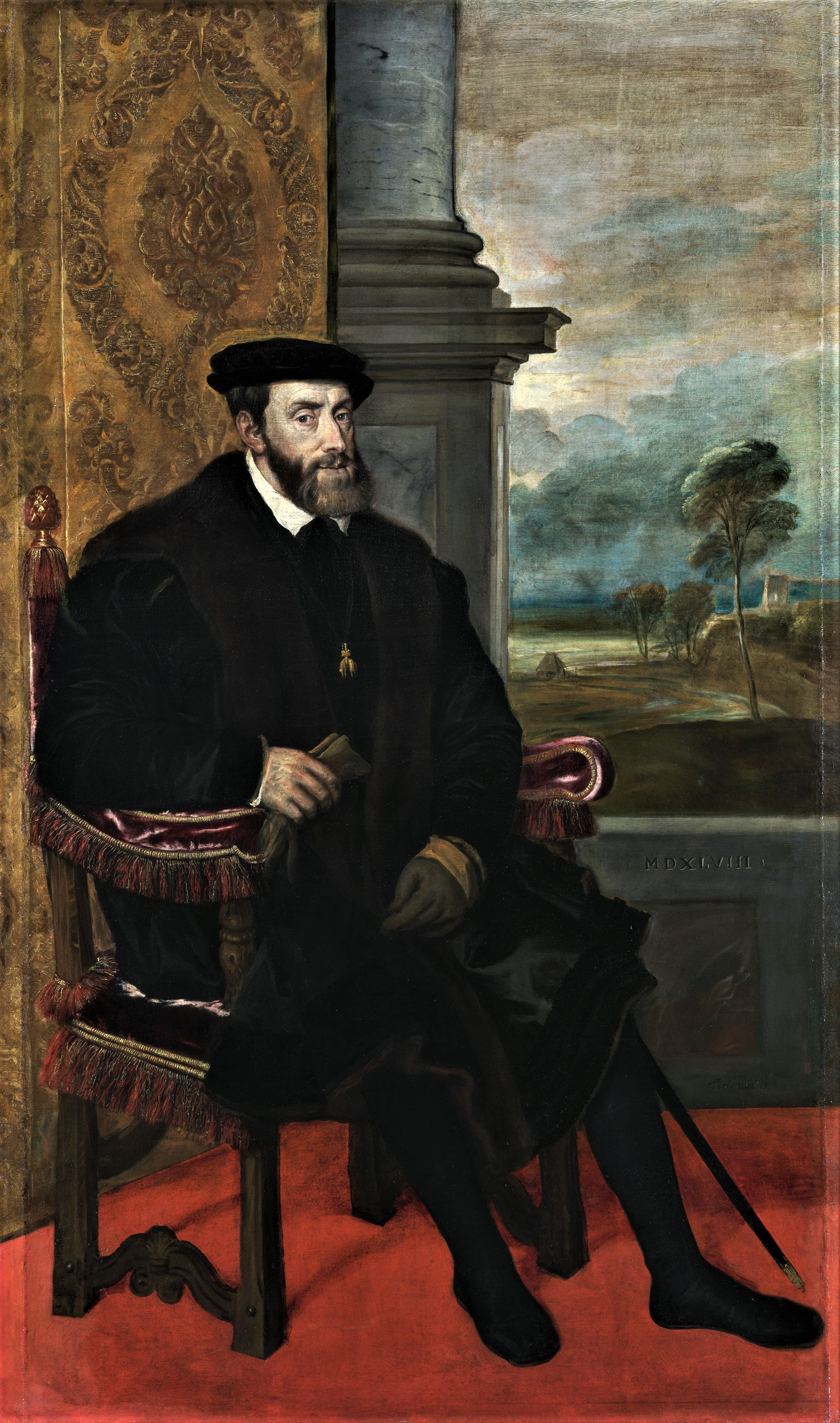
Charles V, Holy Roman Emperor, Titian, c.1500–1558

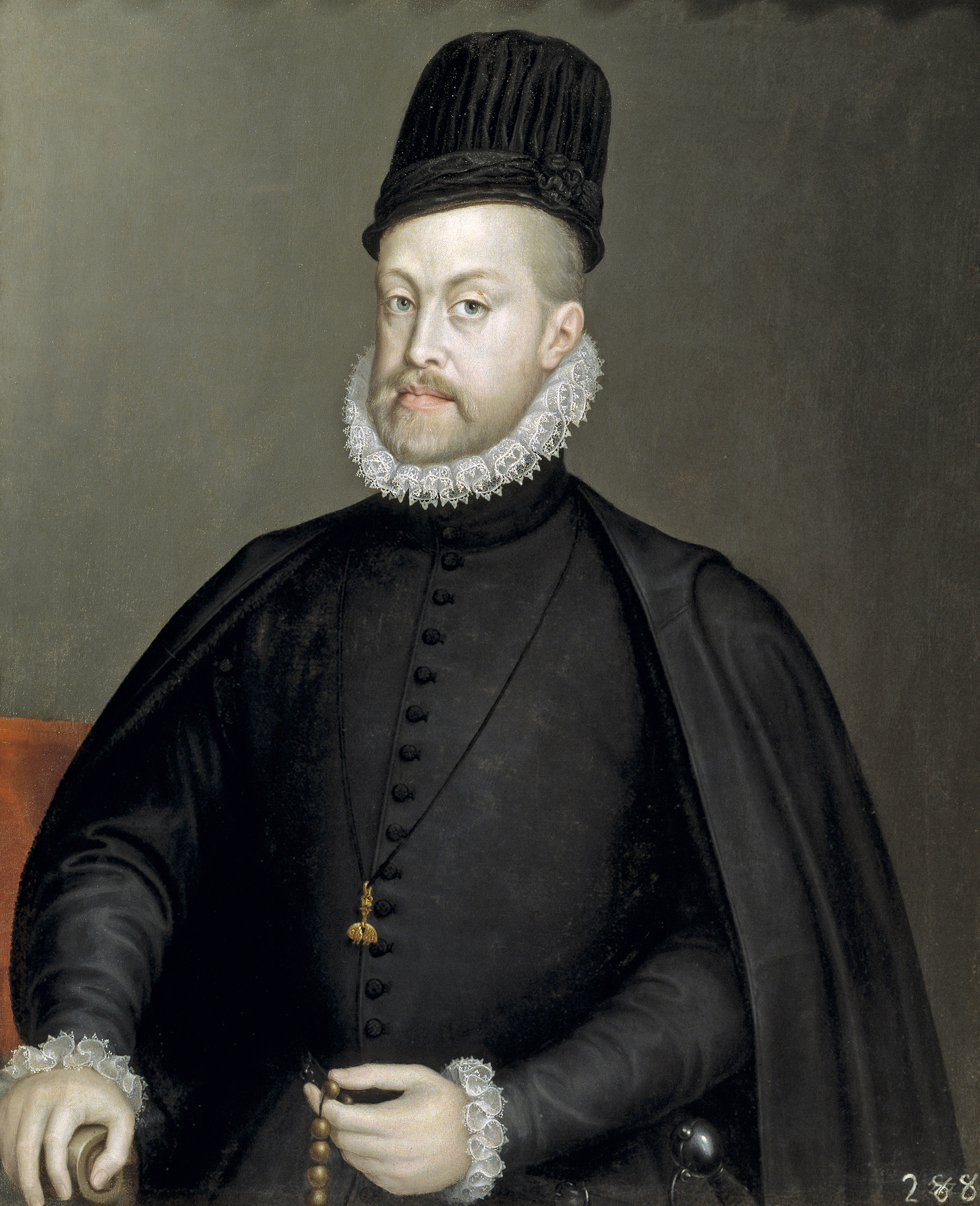
Portrait of Philip II of Spain (1527–1598)

=== Modern ===
==== 16th and 17th centuries ====
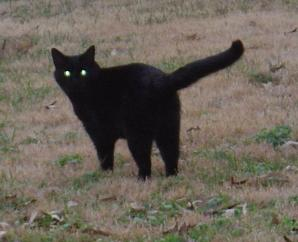
Black cats have been accused for centuries of being the familiar spirits of witches or of bringing bad luck.

While black was the color worn by the Catholic rulers of Europe, it was also the emblematic color of the Protestant Reformation in Europe and the Puritans in England and America. John Calvin, Philip Melanchthon and other Protestant theologians denounced the richly colored and decorated interiors of Roman Catholic churches. They saw the color red, worn by the pope and his cardinals, as the color of luxury, sin, and human folly. In some northern European cities, mobs attacked churches and cathedrals, smashed the stained glass windows and defaced the statues and decoration. In Protestant doctrine, clothing was required to be sober, simple and discreet. Bright colors were banished and replaced by blacks, browns and grays; women and children were recommended to wear white.

In the Protestant Netherlands, Rembrandt used this sober new palette of blacks and browns to create portraits whose faces emerged from the shadows expressing the deepest human emotions. The Catholic painters of the Counter-Reformation, like Rubens, went in the opposite direction; they filled their paintings with bright and rich colors. The new Baroque churches of the Counter-Reformation were usually shining white inside and filled with statues, frescoes, marble, gold and colorful paintings, to appeal to the public. But European Catholics of all classes, like Protestants, eventually adopted a sober wardrobe that was mostly black, brown and gray.

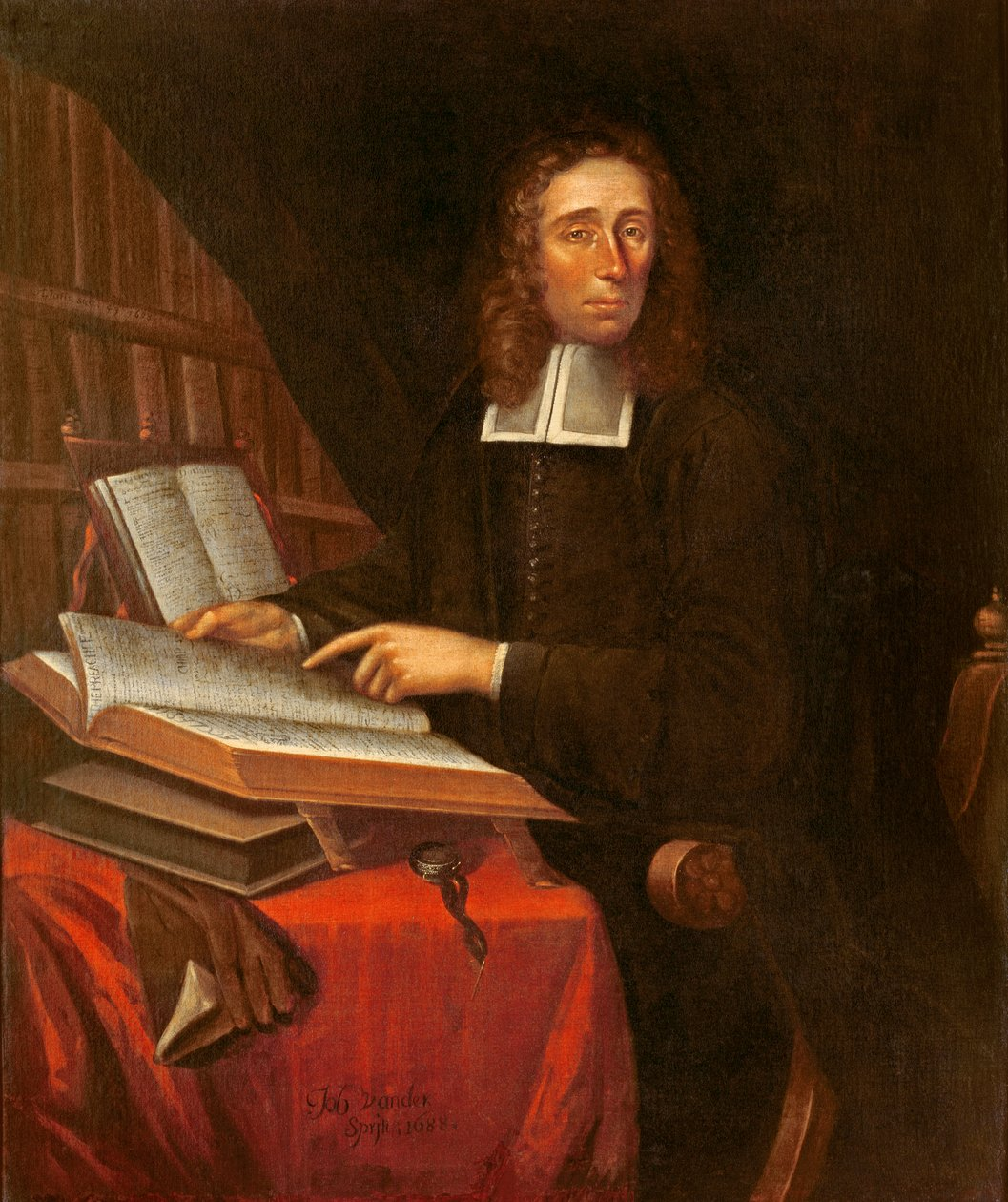
Increase Mather, an American Puritan clergyman (1688).

Rembrandt, Self-portrait (1659)

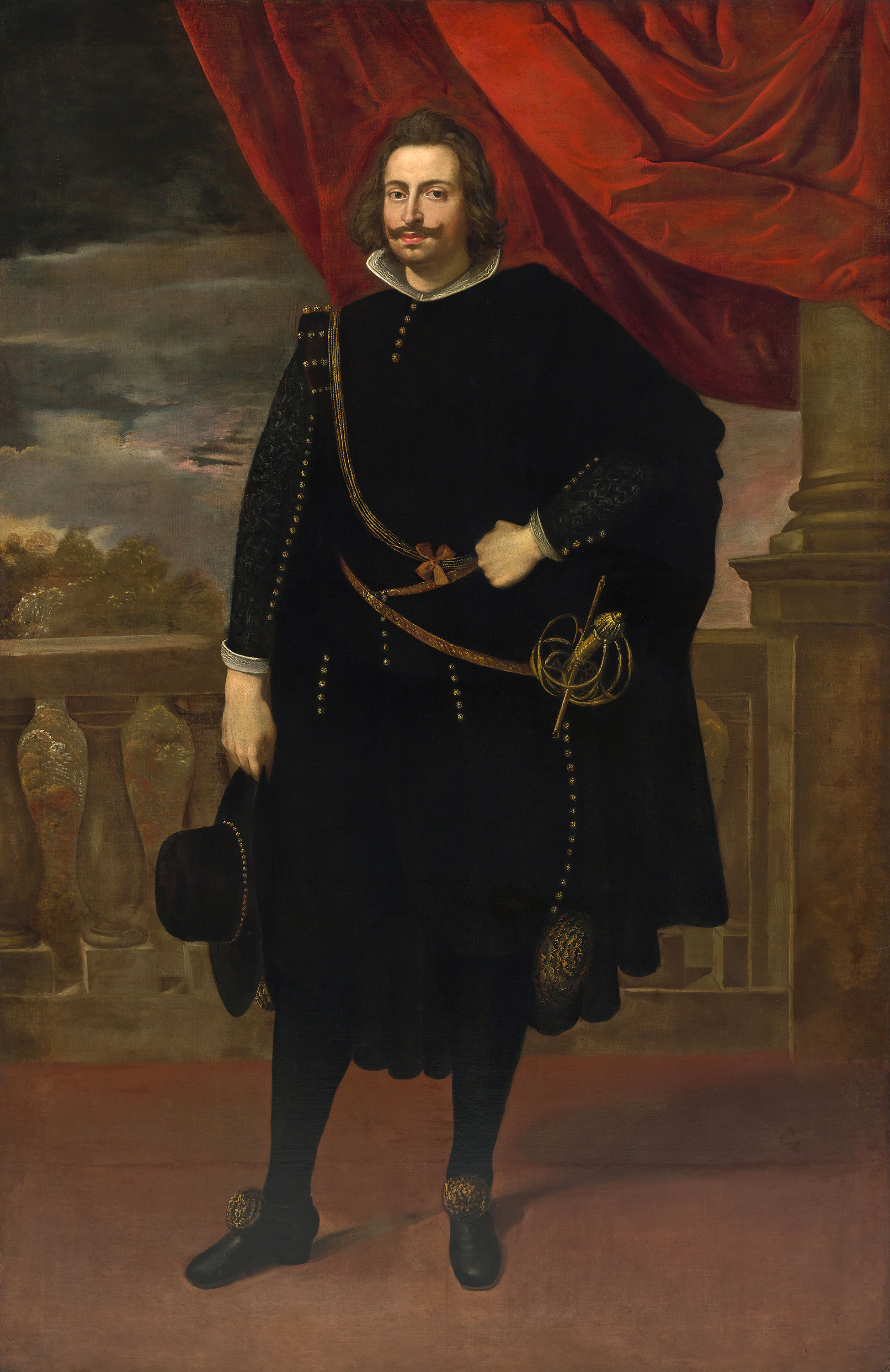
John, Duke of Braganza, later King John IV of Portugal (1628)

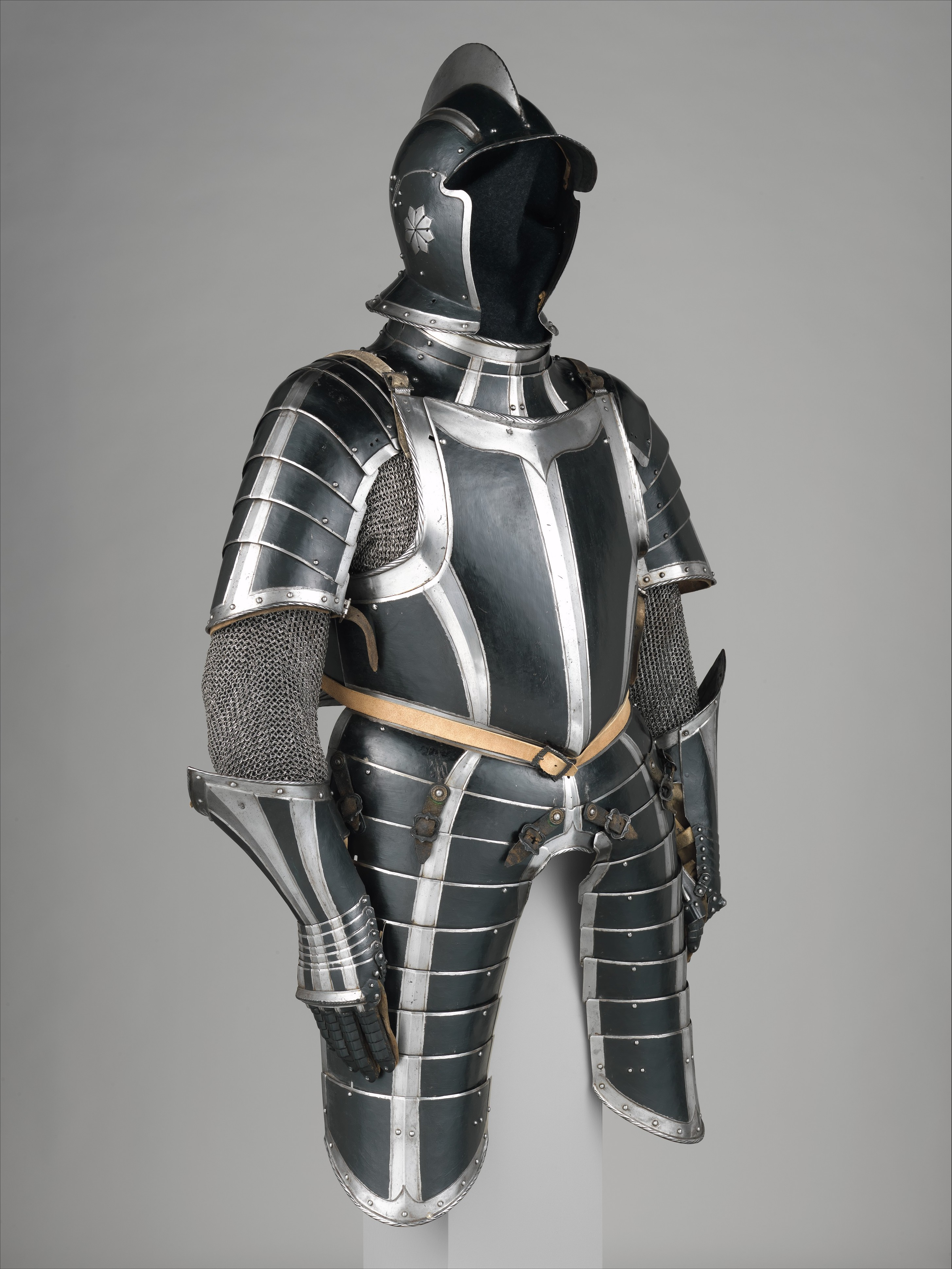
Black painted suit of German armor crafted circa 1600.

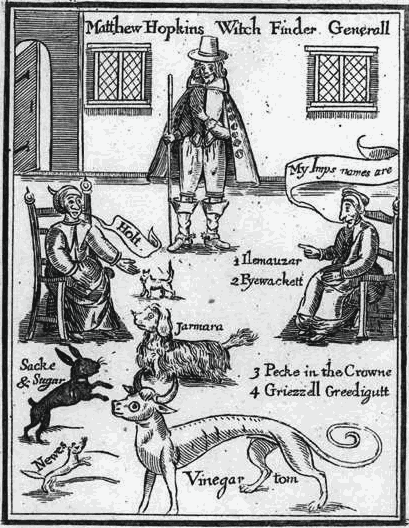
An English manual on witch-hunting (1647), showing a witch with her familiar spirits

In the second part of the 17th century, Europe and America experienced an epidemic of fear of witchcraft. People widely believed that the devil appeared at midnight in a ceremony called a Black Mass or black sabbath, usually in the form of a black animal, often a goat, a dog, a wolf, a bear, a deer or a rooster, accompanied by their familiar spirits, black cats, serpents and other black creatures. This was the origin of the widespread superstition about black cats and other black animals. In medieval Flanders, in a ceremony called Kattenstoet, black cats were thrown from the belfry of the Cloth Hall of Ypres to ward off witchcraft.

Witch trials were common in both Europe and America during this period. During the notorious Salem witch trials in New England in 1692–93, one of those on trial was accused of being able to turn into a "black thing with a blue cap", and others of having familiars in the form of a black dog, a black cat and a black bird. Nineteen women and men were hanged as witches.

==== 18th and 19th centuries ====
In the 18th century, during the European Age of Enlightenment, black receded as a fashion color. Paris became the fashion capital, and pastels, blues, greens, yellow and white became the colors of the nobility and upper classes. But after the French Revolution, black again became the dominant color. Black was the color of the industrial revolution, largely fueled by coal, and later by oil. Thanks to coal smoke, the buildings of the large cities of Europe and America gradually turned black. By 1846 the industrial area of the West Midlands of England was "commonly called 'the Black Country'". Charles Dickens and other writers described the dark streets and smoky skies of London, and they were vividly illustrated in the wood-engravings of French artist Gustave Doré.

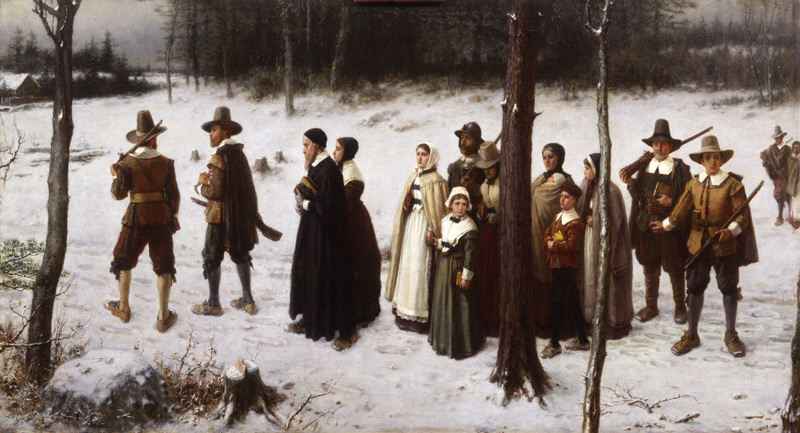
American Pilgrims in New England going to church, George Henry Boughton, 1867

A different kind of black was an important part of the romantic movement in literature. Black was the color of melancholy, the dominant theme of romanticism. The novels of the period were filled with castles, ruins, dungeons, storms, and meetings at midnight. The leading poets of the movement were usually portrayed dressed in black, usually with a white shirt and open collar, and a scarf carelessly over their shoulder, Percy Bysshe Shelley and Lord Byron helped create the enduring stereotype of the romantic poet.

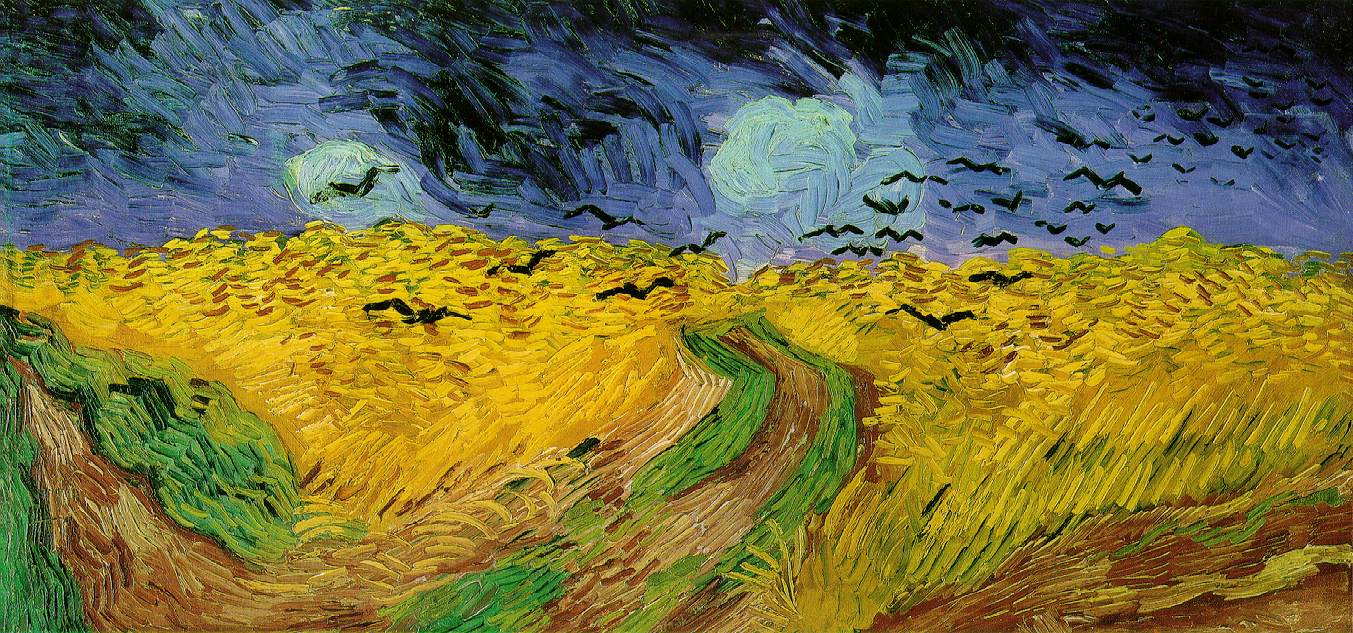
Wheat Field with Crows (1890), one of Vincent van Gogh's last paintings

The invention of inexpensive synthetic black dyes and the industrialization of the textile industry meant that high-quality black clothes were available for the first time to the general population. In the 19th century black gradually became the most popular color of business dress of the upper and middle classes in England, the Continent, and America. Black dominated literature and fashion in the 19th century, and played a large role in painting. James McNeill Whistler made the color the subject of his most famous painting, Arrangement in grey and black number one (1871), better known as Whistler's Mother.

Some 19th-century French painters had a low opinion of black: "Reject black," Paul Gauguin said, "and that mix of black and white they call gray. Nothing is black, nothing is gray." But Édouard Manet used blacks for their strength and dramatic effect. Manet's portrait of painter Berthe Morisot was a study in black which perfectly captured her spirit of independence. The black gave the painting power and immediacy; he even changed her eyes, which were green, to black to strengthen the effect. Henri Matisse quoted the French impressionist Pissarro telling him, "Manet is stronger than us all – he made light with black."

Pierre-Auguste Renoir used luminous blacks, especially in his portraits. When someone told him that black was not a color, Renoir replied: "What makes you think that? Black is the queen of colors. I always detested Prussian blue. I tried to replace black with a mixture of red and blue, I tried using cobalt blue or ultramarine, but I always came back to ivory black."

Vincent van Gogh used black lines to outline many of the objects in his paintings, such as the bed in the famous painting of his bedroom. making them stand apart. His painting of black crows over a cornfield, painted shortly before he died, was particularly agitated and haunting. In the late 19th century, black also became the color of anarchism. (See the section political movements.)

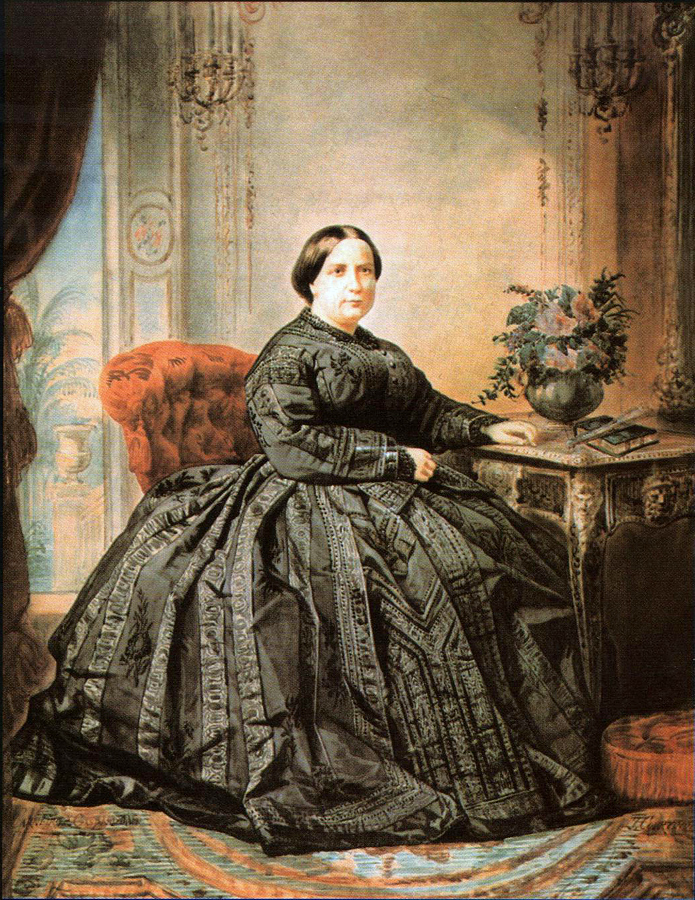
Portrait of Empress Teresa Cristina of Brazil (circa 1870)

Arrangement in Grey and Black Number 1 (1871) by James McNeill Whistler better known as Whistler's Mother.

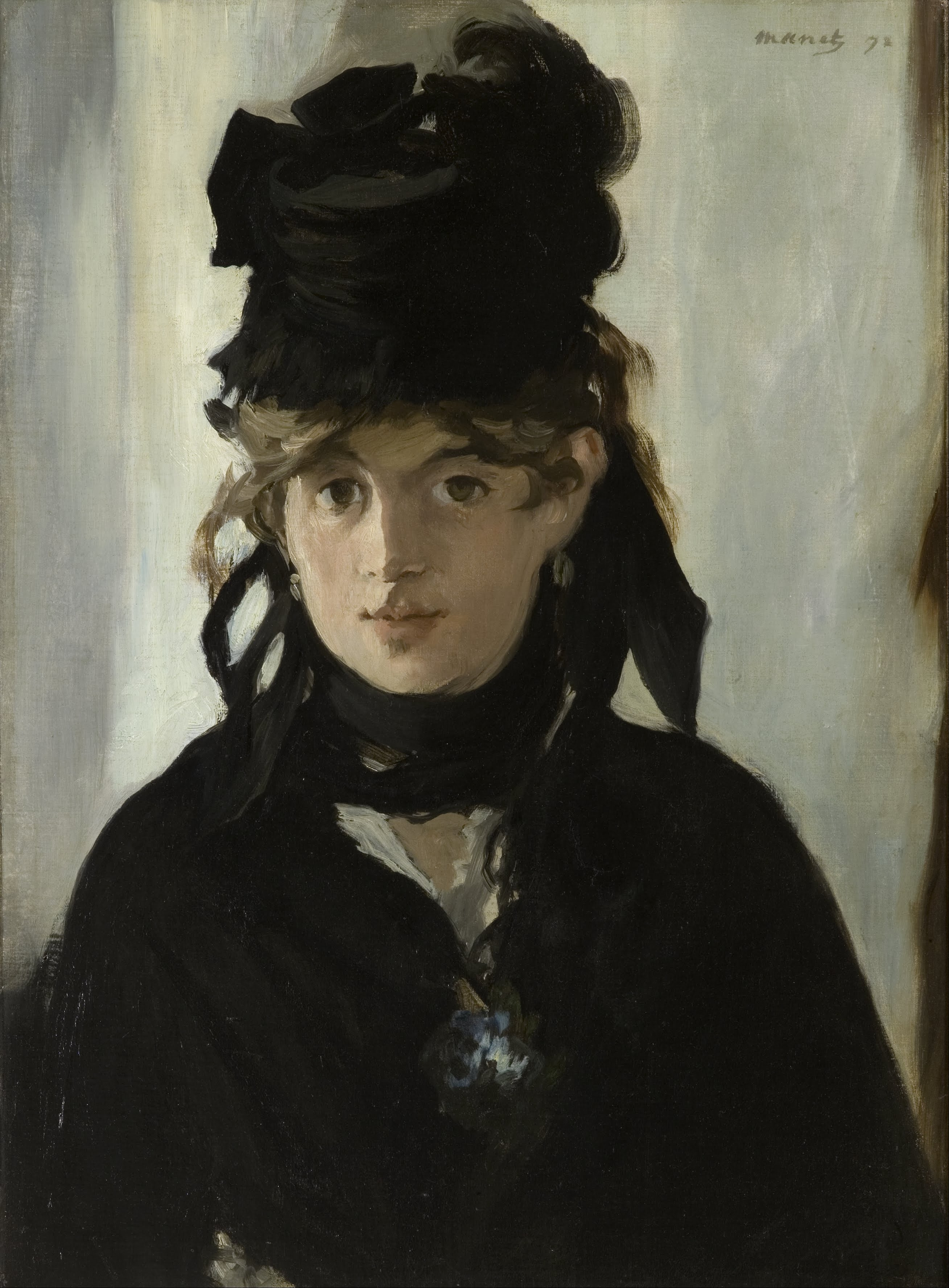
Berthe Morisot with a Bouquet of Violets, by Édouard Manet (1872).

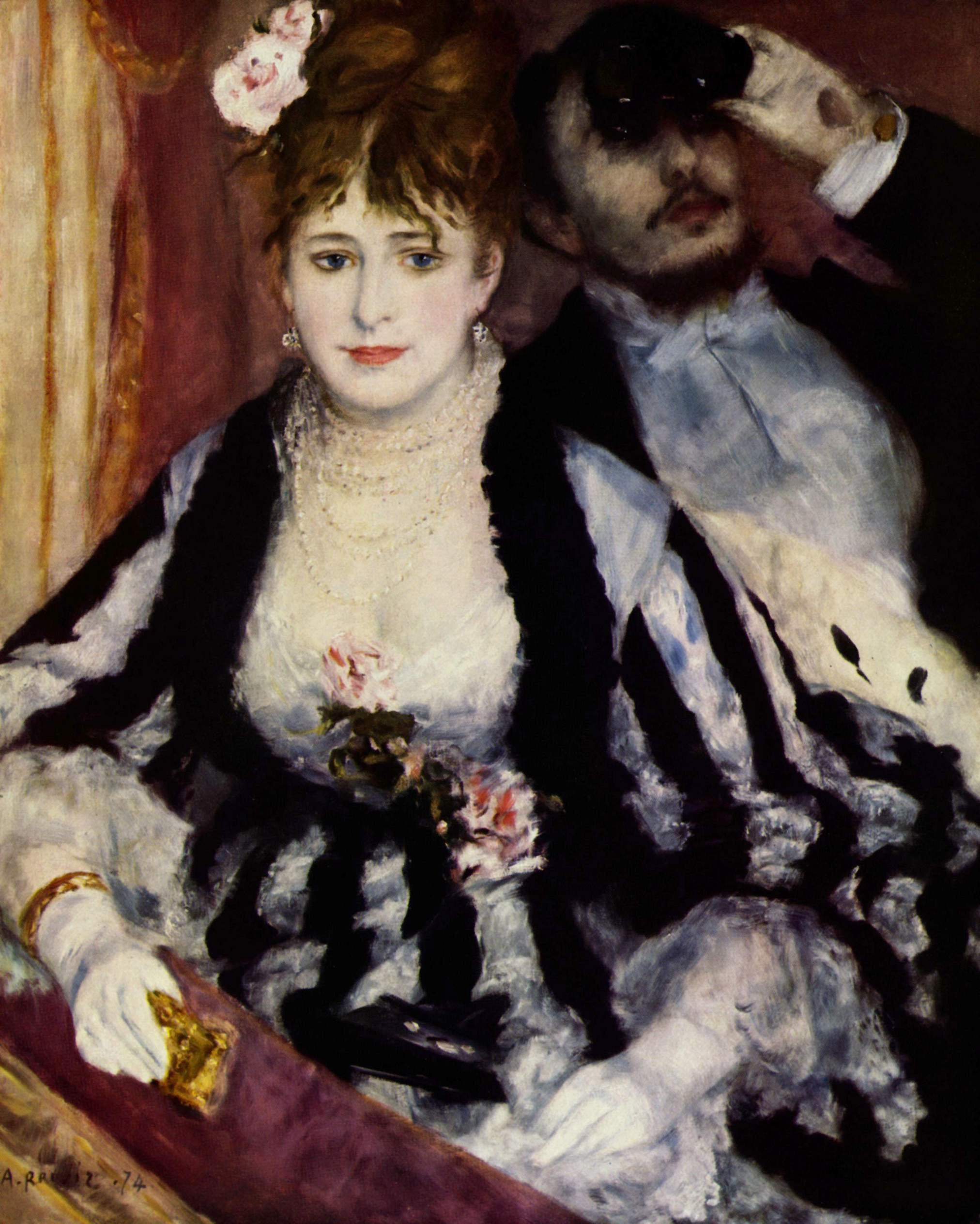
The Theater Box (1874) by Pierre-Auguste Renoir, captured the luminosity of black fabric in the light.

==== 20th and 21st centuries ====
In the 20th century, black was utilized by Italian and German fascism. (See the section political movements). In art, the color regained some of the territory that it had lost during the 19th century. The Russian painter Kasimir Malevich, a member of the Suprematist movement, created the Black Square in 1915, is widely considered the first purely abstract painting. He wrote, "The painted work is no longer simply the imitation of reality, but is this very reality ... It is not a demonstration of ability, but the materialization of an idea."

Black was appreciated by Henri Matisse. "When I didn't know what color to put down, I put down black," he said in 1945. "Black is a force: I used black as ballast to simplify the construction ... Since the impressionists it seems to have made continuous progress, taking a more and more important part in color orchestration, comparable to that of the double bass as a solo instrument."

In the 1950s, black came to be a symbol of individuality and intellectual and social rebellion, the color of those who did not accept established norms and values. In Paris, it was worn by Left-Bank intellectuals and performers such as Juliette Gréco, and by some members of the Beat Movement in New York and San Francisco. Black leather jackets were worn by motorcycle gangs such as the Hells Angels and street gangs on the fringes of society in the United States. Black as a color of rebellion was celebrated in such films as The Wild One, with Marlon Brando. By the end of the 20th century, black was the emblematic color of punk fashion and the goth subculture. Goth fashion, which emerged in England in the 1980s, was inspired by Victorian era mourning dress.

In men's fashion, black gradually ceded its dominance to navy blue, particularly in business suits. Black evening dress and formal dress in general were worn less and less. In 1960, John F. Kennedy was the last American President to be inaugurated wearing formal dress; Lyndon Johnson and his successors were inaugurated wearing business suits.

Women's fashion was revolutionized and simplified in 1926 by the French designer Coco Chanel, who published a drawing of a simple black dress in Vogue magazine. She famously said, "A woman needs just three things; a black dress, a black sweater, and, on her arm, a man she loves." French designer Jean Patou also followed suit by creating a black collection in 1929. Other designers contributed to the trend of the little black dress. The Italian designer Gianni Versace said, "Black is the quintessence of simplicity and elegance," and French designer Yves Saint Laurent said, "black is the liaison which connects art and fashion. One of the most famous black dresses of the century was designed by Hubert de Givenchy and was worn by Audrey Hepburn in the 1961 film Breakfast at Tiffany's.

The American civil rights movement in the 1950s was a struggle for the political equality of African Americans. It developed into the Black Power movement in the early 1960s until the late 1980s, and the Black Lives Matter movement in the 2010s and 2020s. It also popularized the slogan "Black is Beautiful".

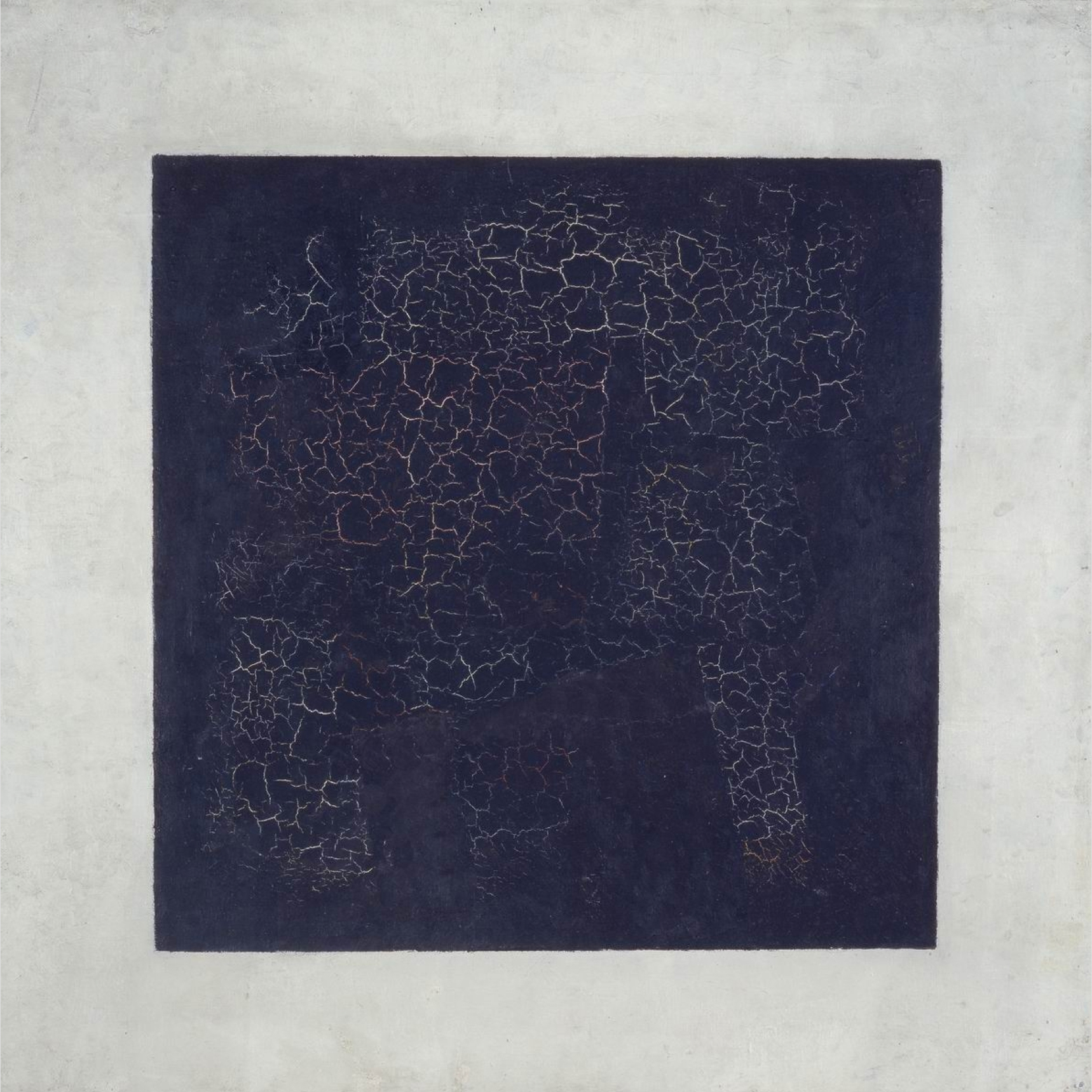
Black Square, Kazimir Malevich, 1915

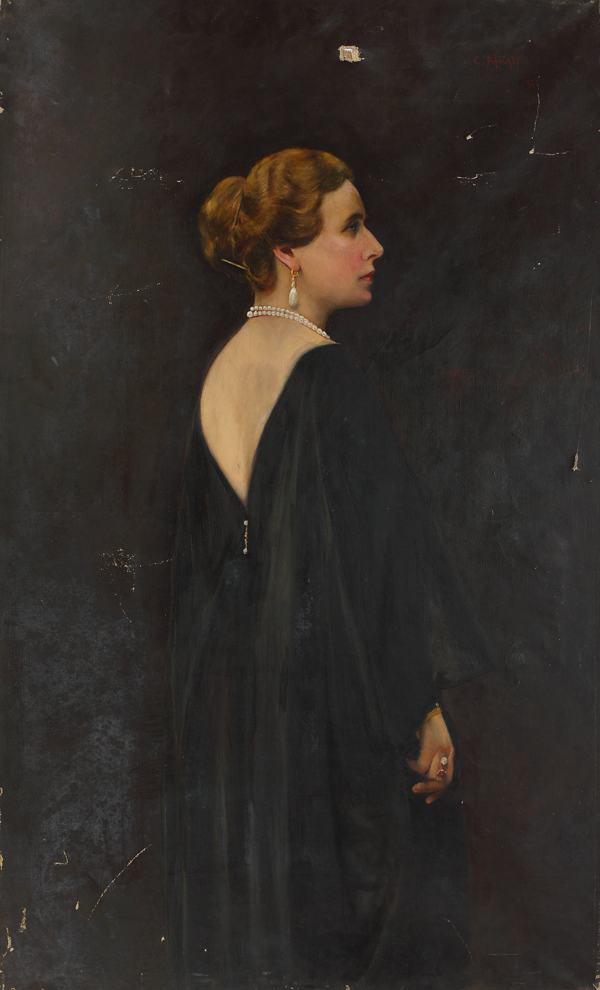
Queen Marie of Romania, Constantin Pascali, early 1920s

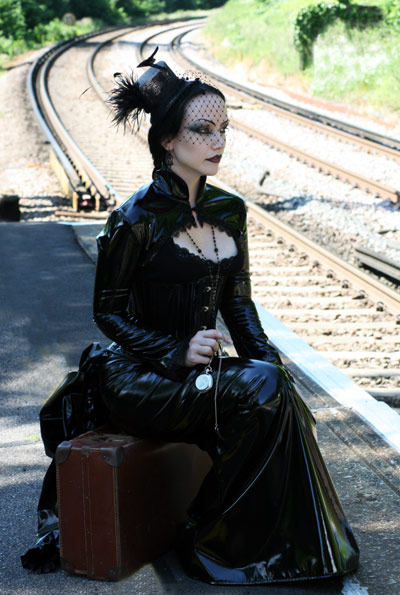
The 21st-century goth fashion model Lady Amaranth, in a style inspired by British Victorian mourning costumes

== Science ==
=== Physics ===
Black can be defined as the color perceived when no visible light reaches the eye. Pigments or dyes that absorb almost all light rather than reflect it back to the eye look black. A black pigment can, however, result from a combination of several pigments that collectively absorb all wavelengths of visible light. If appropriate proportions of three primary pigments are mixed, the result reflects so little light as to be called black. This provides two superficially opposite but actually complementary descriptions of black. Black is the color produced by the absorption of all wavelengths of visible light, or an exhaustive combination of multiple colors of pigment.

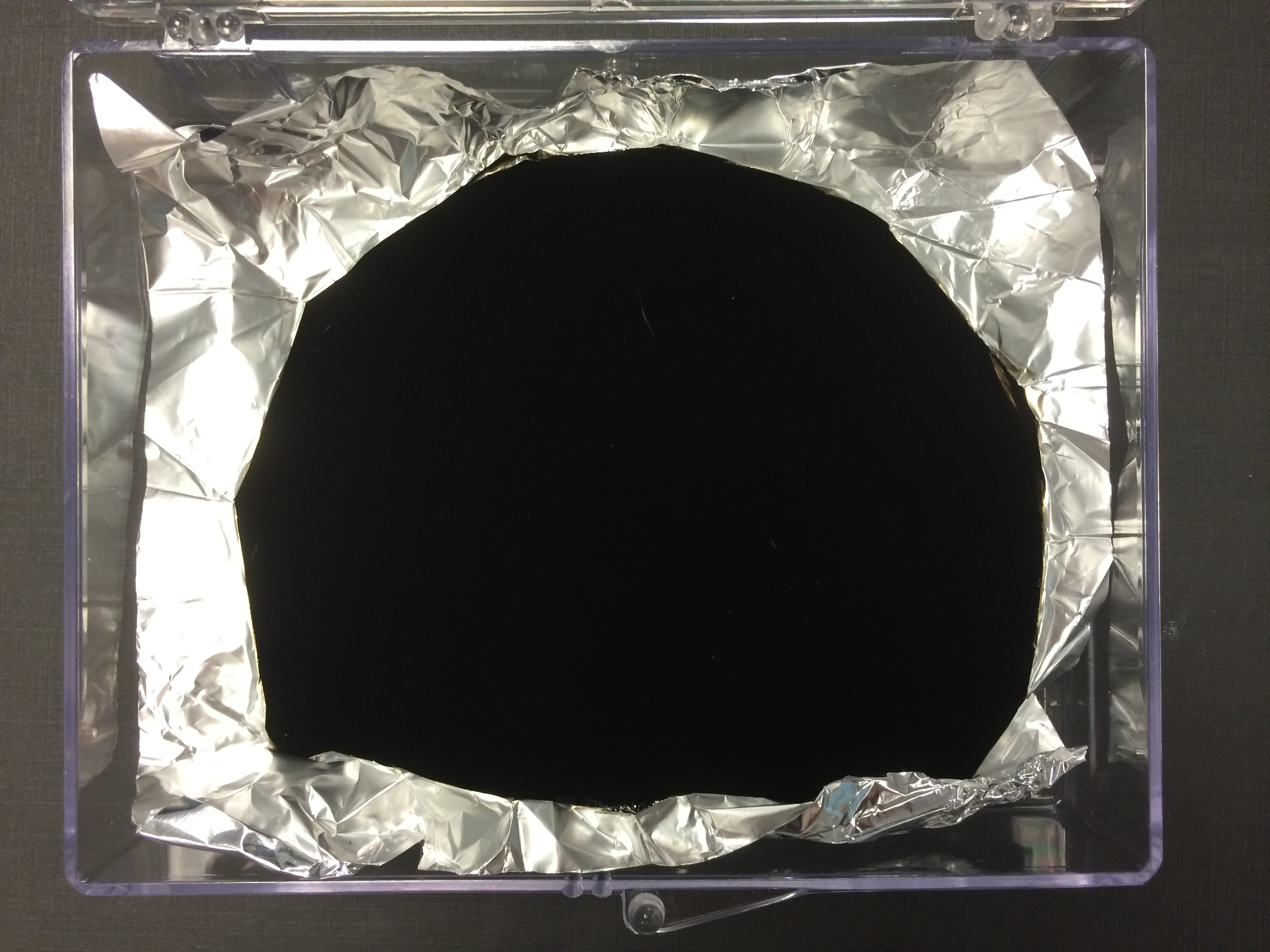
Vantablack was the blackest substance known until 2019.

In physics, a black body is a perfect absorber of light, but, by a thermodynamic rule, it is also the best emitter. Thus, the best radiative cooling, out of sunlight, is by using black paint, though it is important that it be black (a nearly perfect absorber) in the infrared as well. In elementary science, far ultraviolet light is called "black light" because, while itself unseen, it causes many minerals and other substances to fluoresce.

Absorption of light is contrasted by transmission, reflection and diffusion, where the light is only redirected, causing objects to appear transparent, reflective or white respectively. A material is said to be black if most incoming light is absorbed equally in the material. Light (electromagnetic radiation in the visible spectrum) interacts with the atoms and molecules, which causes the energy of the light to be converted into other forms of energy, usually heat. This means that black surfaces can act as thermal collectors, absorbing light and generating heat (see Solar thermal collector).

As of September 2019, the darkest material is made from vertically aligned carbon nanotubes. The material was grown by MIT engineers and was reported to have a 99.995% absorption rate of any incoming light. This surpasses any former darkest materials including Vantablack, which has a peak absorption rate of 99.965% in the visible spectrum.

=== Chemistry ===
==== Pigments ====
The earliest pigments used by Neolithic humans were charcoal, red ocher and yellow ocher. The black lines of cave art were drawn with the tips of burnt torches made of a wood with resin. Different charcoal pigments were made by burning different woods and animal products, each of which produced a different tone. The charcoal would be ground and then mixed with animal fat to make the pigment.

- Vine black was produced in Roman times by burning the cut branches of grapevines. It could also be produced by burning the remains of the crushed grapes, which were collected and dried in an oven. According to the historian Vitruvius, the deepness and richness of the black produced corresponded to the quality of the wine. The finest wines produced a black with a bluish tinge the color of indigo.

The 15th-century painter Cennino Cennini described how this pigment was made during the Renaissance in his famous handbook for artists: "...there is a black which is made from the tendrils of vines. And these tendrils need to be burned. And when they have been burned, throw some water onto them and put them out and then mull them in the same way as the other black. And this is a lean and black pigment and is one of the perfect pigments that we use."

Cennini also noted that "There is another black which is made from burnt almond shells or peaches and this is a perfect, fine black." Similar fine blacks were made by burning the pits of the peach, cherry or apricot. The powdered charcoal was then mixed with gum arabic or the yellow of an egg to make a paint.

Different civilizations burned different plants to produce their charcoal pigments. The Inuit of Alaska used wood charcoal mixed with the blood of seals to paint masks and wooden objects. The Polynesians burned coconuts to produce their pigment.

- Lamp black was used as a pigment for painting and frescoes, as a dye for fabrics, and in some societies for making tattoos. The 15th century Florentine painter Cennino Cennini described how it was made during the Renaissance: "... take a lamp full of linseed oil and fill the lamp with the oil and light the lamp. Then place it, lit, under a thoroughly clean pan and make sure that the flame from the lamp is two or three fingers from the bottom of the pan. The smoke that comes off the flame will hit the bottom of the pan and gather, becoming thick. Wait a bit. take the pan and brush this pigment (that is, this smoke) onto paper or into a pot with something. And it is not necessary to mull or grind it because it is a very fine pigment. Re-fill the lamp with the oil and put it under the pan like this several times and, in this way, make as much of it as is necessary." This same pigment was used by Indian artists to paint the Ajanta Caves, and as dye in ancient Japan.
- Ivory black, also known as bone char, was originally produced by burning ivory and mixing the resulting charcoal powder with oil. The color is still made today, but ordinary animal bones are substituted for ivory.
- Mars black is a black pigment made of synthetic iron oxides. It is commonly used in water-colors and oil painting. It takes its name from Mars, the god of war and patron of iron.

==== Dyes ====
Good-quality black dyes were not known until the middle of the 14th century. The most common early dyes were made from bark, roots or fruits of different trees; usually walnuts, chestnuts, or certain oak trees. The blacks produced were often more gray, brown or bluish. The cloth had to be dyed several times to darken the color. One solution used by dyers was add to the dye some iron filings, rich in iron oxide, which gave a deeper black. Another was to first dye the fabric dark blue, and then to dye it black.

A much richer and deeper black dye was eventually found made from the oak apple or "gall-nut". The gall-nut is a small round tumor which grows on oak and other varieties of trees. They range in size from 2–5 cm, and are caused by chemicals injected by the larva of certain kinds of gall wasp in the family Cynipidae. The dye was very expensive; a great quantity of gall-nuts were needed for a very small amount of dye. The gall-nuts which made the best dye came from Poland, eastern Europe, the near east and North Africa. Beginning in about the 14th century, dye from gall-nuts was used for clothes of the kings and princes of Europe.

Another important source of natural black dyes from the 17th century onwards was the logwood tree, or Haematoxylum campechianum, which also produced reddish and bluish dyes. It is a species of flowering tree in the legume family, Fabaceae, that is native to southern Mexico and northern Central America. The modern nation of Belize grew from 17th century English logwood logging camps.

Since the mid-19th century, synthetic black dyes have largely replaced natural dyes. One of the important synthetic blacks is Nigrosin, a mixture of synthetic black dyes (CI 50415, Solvent black 5) made by heating a mixture of nitrobenzene, aniline and aniline hydrochloride in the presence of a copper or iron catalyst. Its main industrial uses are as a colorant for lacquers and varnishes and in marker-pen inks.

==== Inks ====
The first known inks were made by the Chinese, and date back to the 23rd century B.C. They used natural plant dyes and minerals such as graphite ground with water and applied with an ink brush. Early Chinese inks similar to the modern inkstick have been found dating to about 256 BC at the end of the Warring States period. They were produced from soot, usually produced by burning pine wood, mixed with animal glue. To make ink from an inkstick, the stick is continuously ground against an inkstone with a small quantity of water to produce a dark liquid which is then applied with an ink brush. Artists and calligraphists could vary the thickness of the resulting ink by reducing or increasing the intensity and time of ink grinding. These inks produced the delicate shading and subtle or dramatic effects of Chinese brush painting.

India ink (or "Indian ink" in British English) is a black ink once widely used for writing and printing and now more commonly used for drawing, especially when inking comic books and comic strips. The technique of making it probably came from China. India ink has been in use in India since at least the 4th century BC, where it was called masi. In India, the black color of the ink came from bone char, tar, pitch and other substances.

The ancient Romans had a black writing ink they called atramentum librarium. Its name came from the Latin word atrare, which meant to make something black. (This was the same root as the English word atrocious.) It was usually made, like India ink, from soot, although one variety, called atramentum elephantinum, was made by burning the ivory of elephants.

Gall-nuts were also used for making fine black writing ink. Iron gall ink (also known as iron gall nut ink or oak gall ink) was a purple-black or brown-black ink made from iron salts and tannic acids from gall nut. It was the standard writing and drawing ink in Europe, from about the 12th century to the 19th century, and remained in use well into the 20th century.

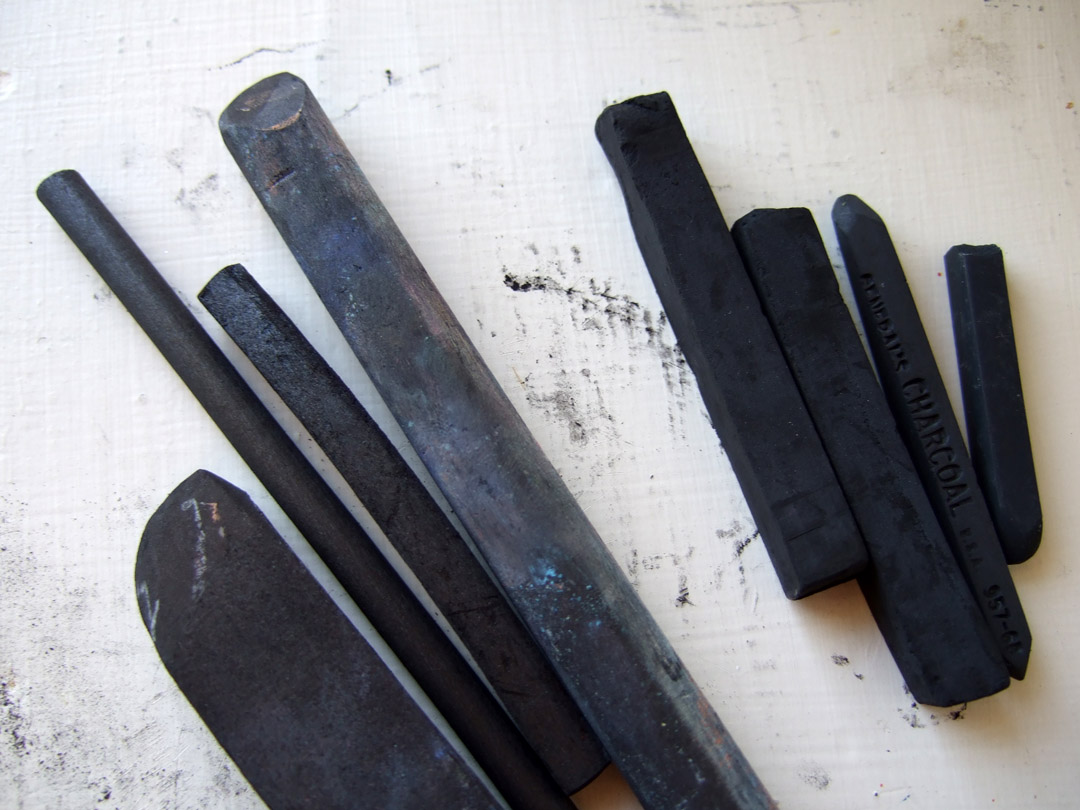
Sticks of vine charcoal and compressed charcoal. Charcoal, along with red and yellow ochre, was one of the first pigments used by Paleolithic man.

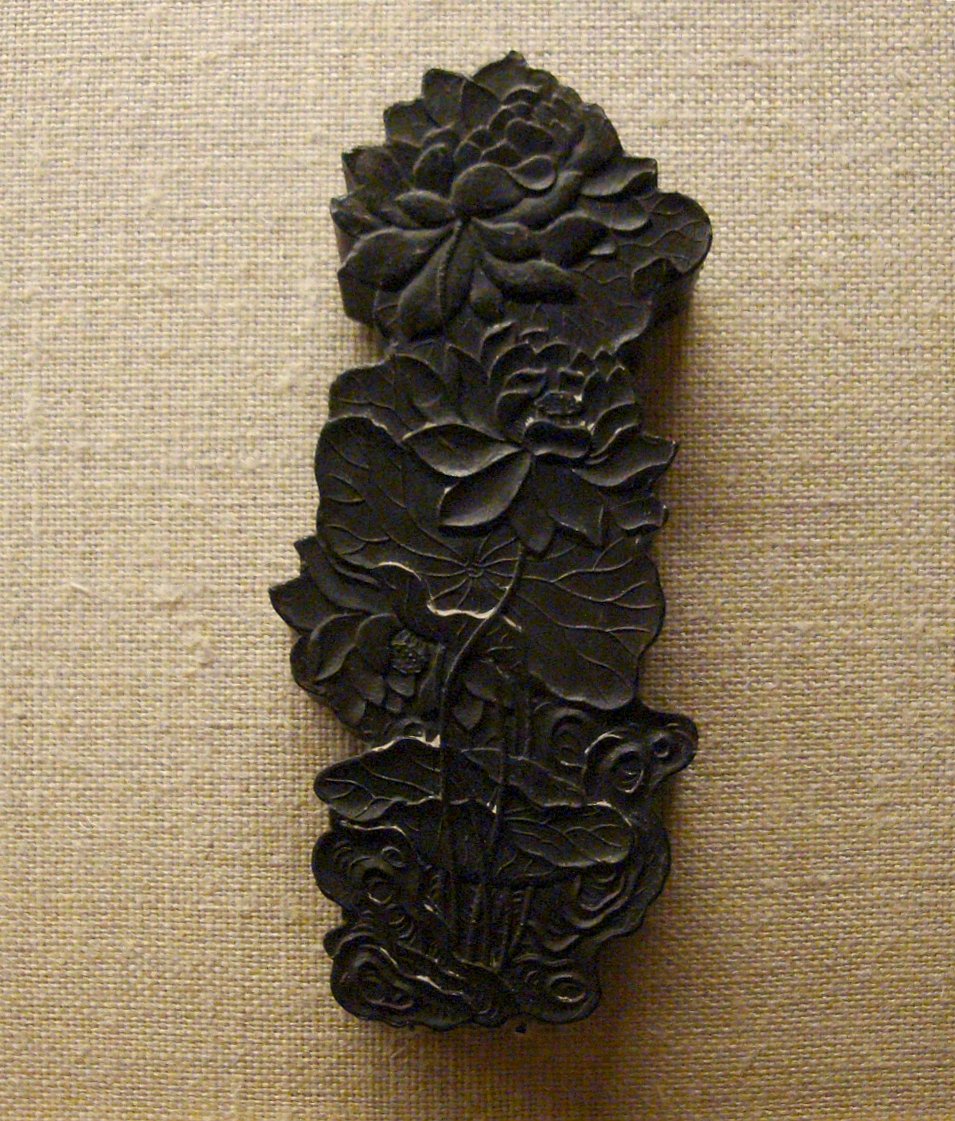
A Chinese inkstick, in the form of lotus flowers and blossoms. Inksticks are used in Chinese calligraphy and brush painting.

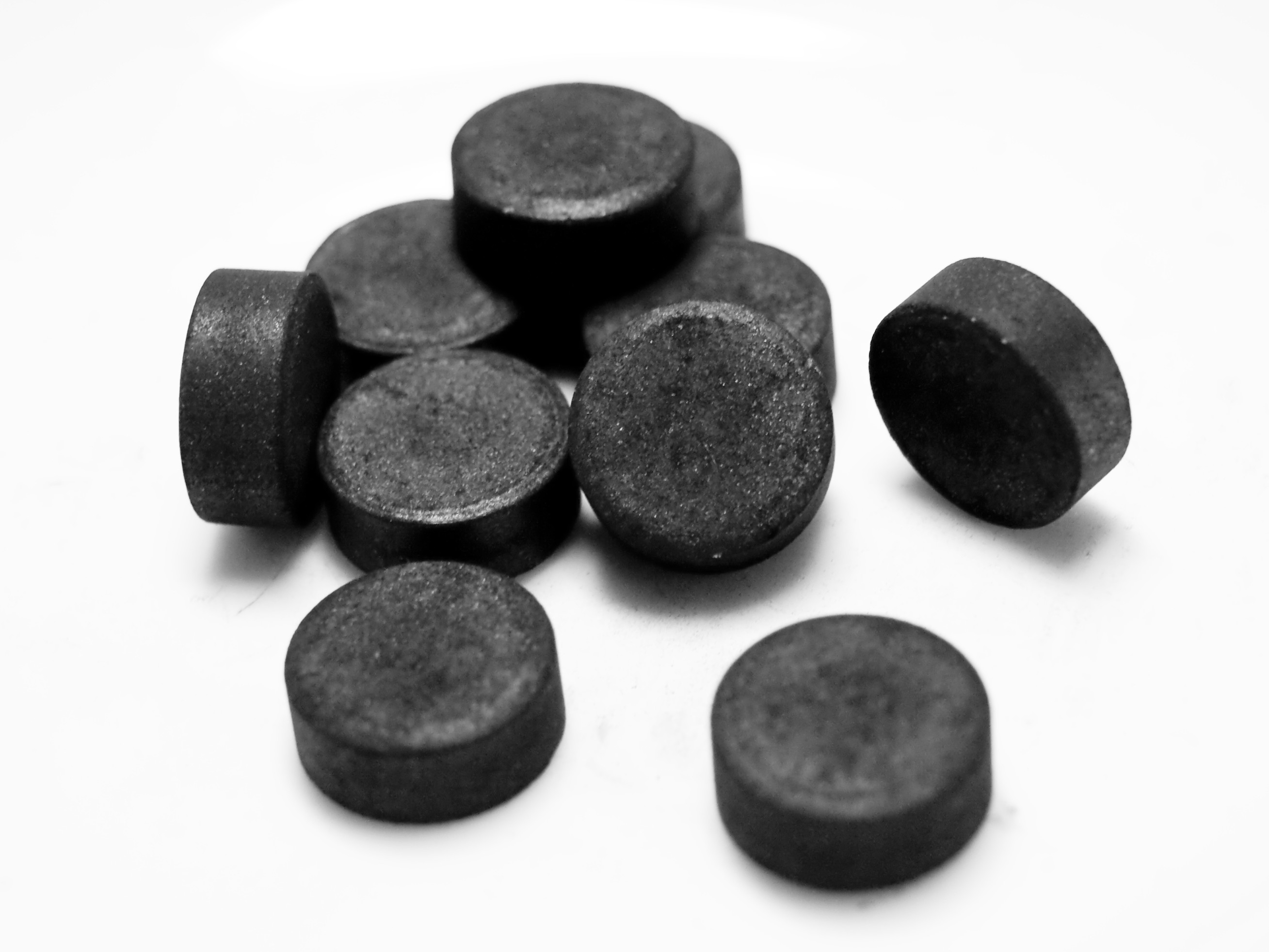
Ivory black or bone char, a natural black pigment made by burning animal bones.

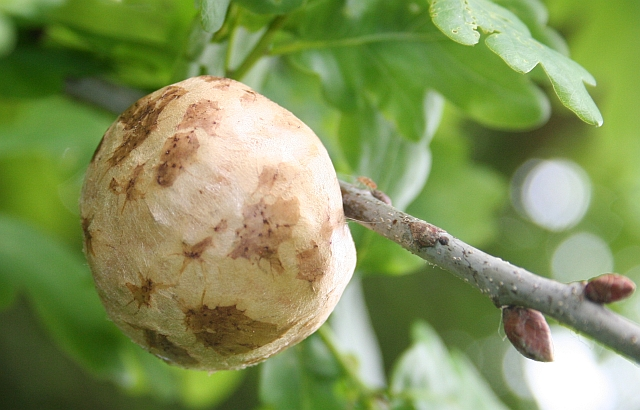
The oak apple or gall-nut, a tumor growing on oak trees, was the main source of black dye and black writing ink from the 14th century until the 19th century.

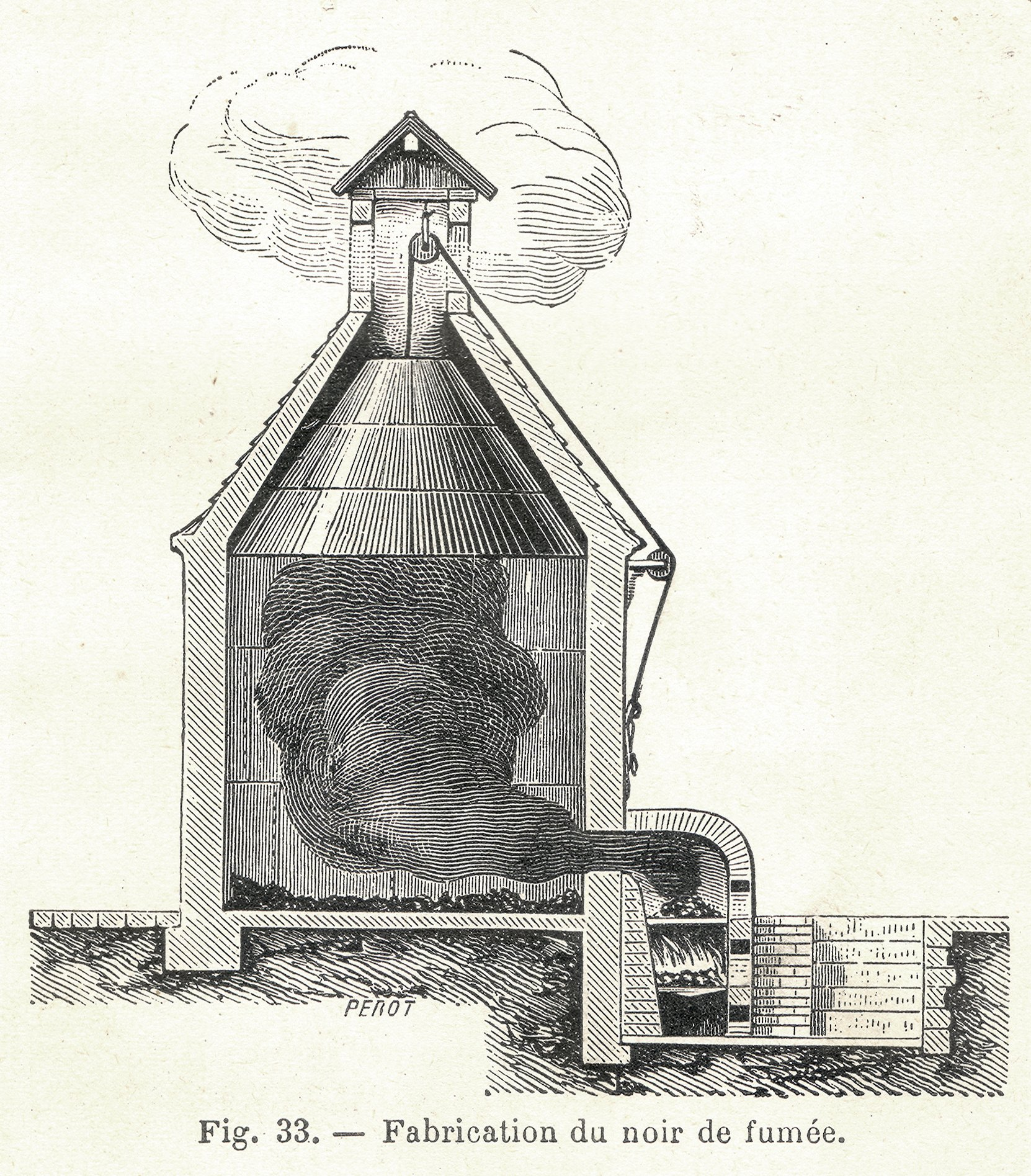
The industrial production of lamp black, made by producing, collecting and refining soot, in 1906.

=== Astronomy ===
- A black hole is a region of spacetime where gravity prevents anything, including light, from escaping. The theory of general relativity predicts that a sufficiently compact mass will deform spacetime to form a black hole. Around a black hole there is a mathematically defined boundary called an event horizon that marks the point of no return. It is called "black" because it absorbs all the light that hits the horizon, reflecting nothing, just like a perfect black body in thermodynamics. Black holes of stellar mass are expected to form when very massive stars collapse at the end of their life cycle. After a black hole has formed it can continue to grow by absorbing mass from its surroundings. By absorbing other stars and merging with other black holes, supermassive black holes of millions of solar masses may form. There is general consensus that supermassive black holes exist in the centers of most galaxies. Although a black hole itself is black, infalling material forms an accretion disk, one of the brightest types of object in the universe.
- Black-body radiation refers to the radiation coming from a body at a given temperature where all incoming energy (light) is converted to heat.
- Black sky refers to the appearance of space as one emerges from Earth's atmosphere.
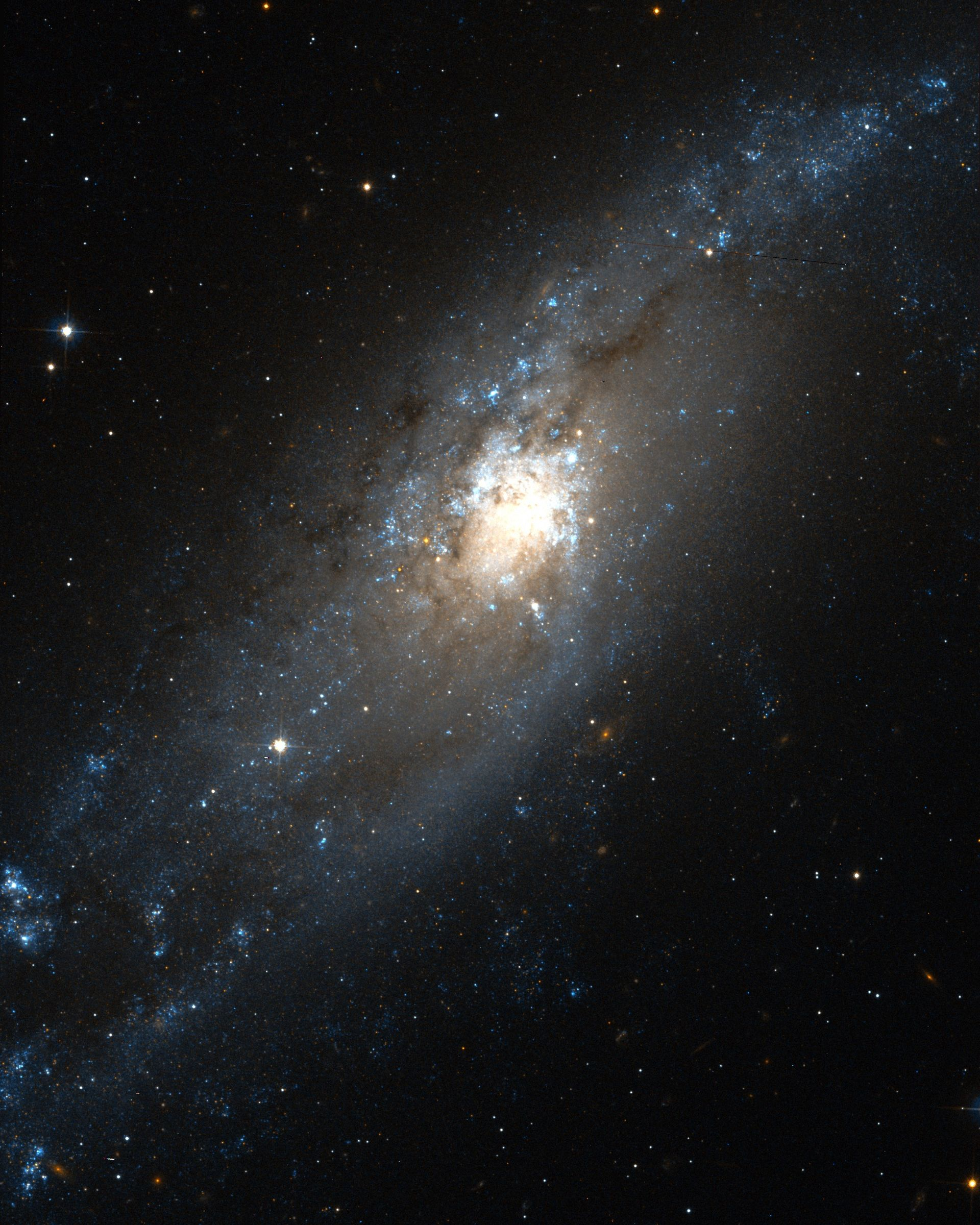
Image of the NGC 406 galaxy from the Hubble Space Telescope

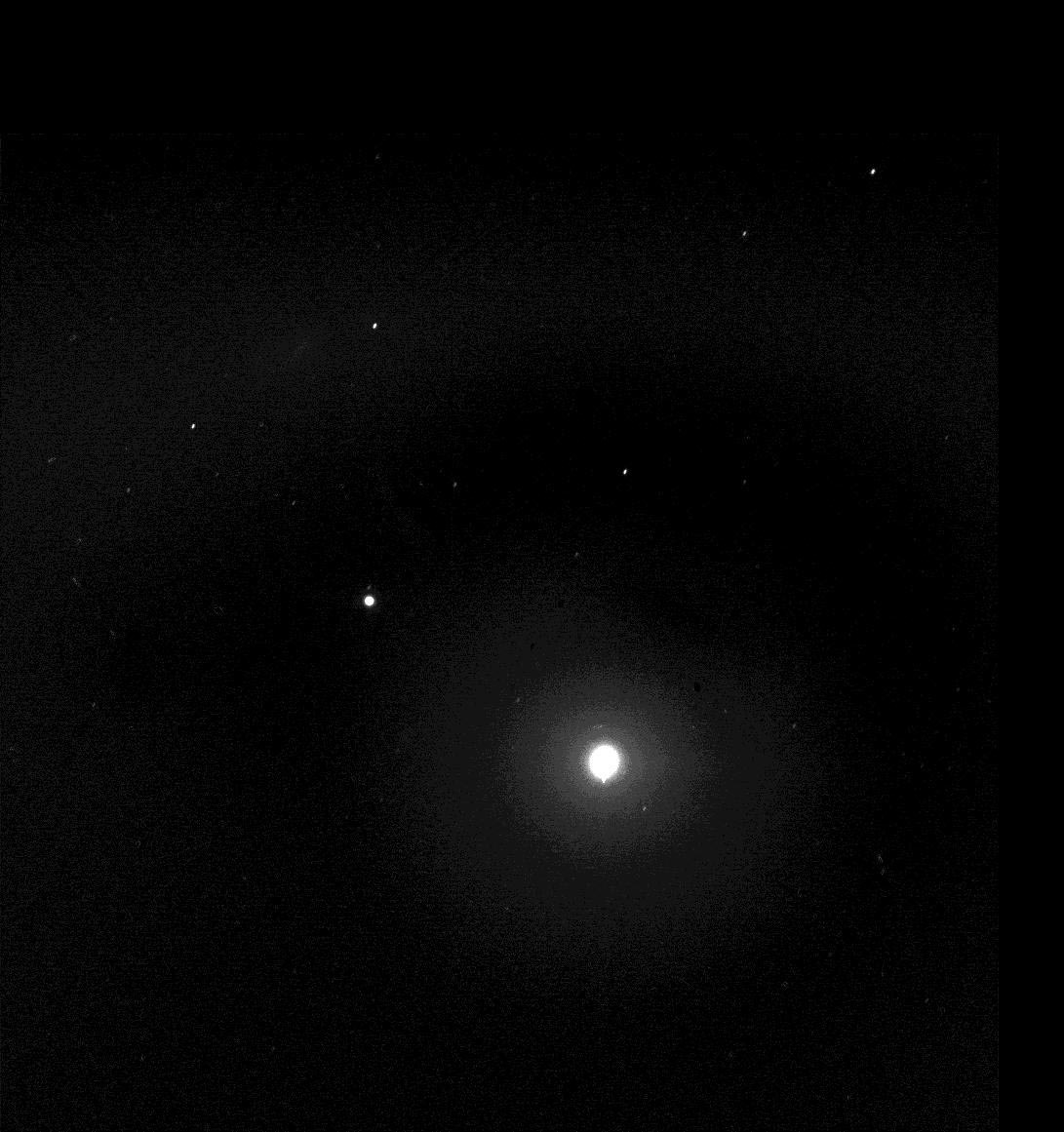
The night sky seen from Mars, with the two moons of Mars visible, taken by the NASA Spirit Rover.

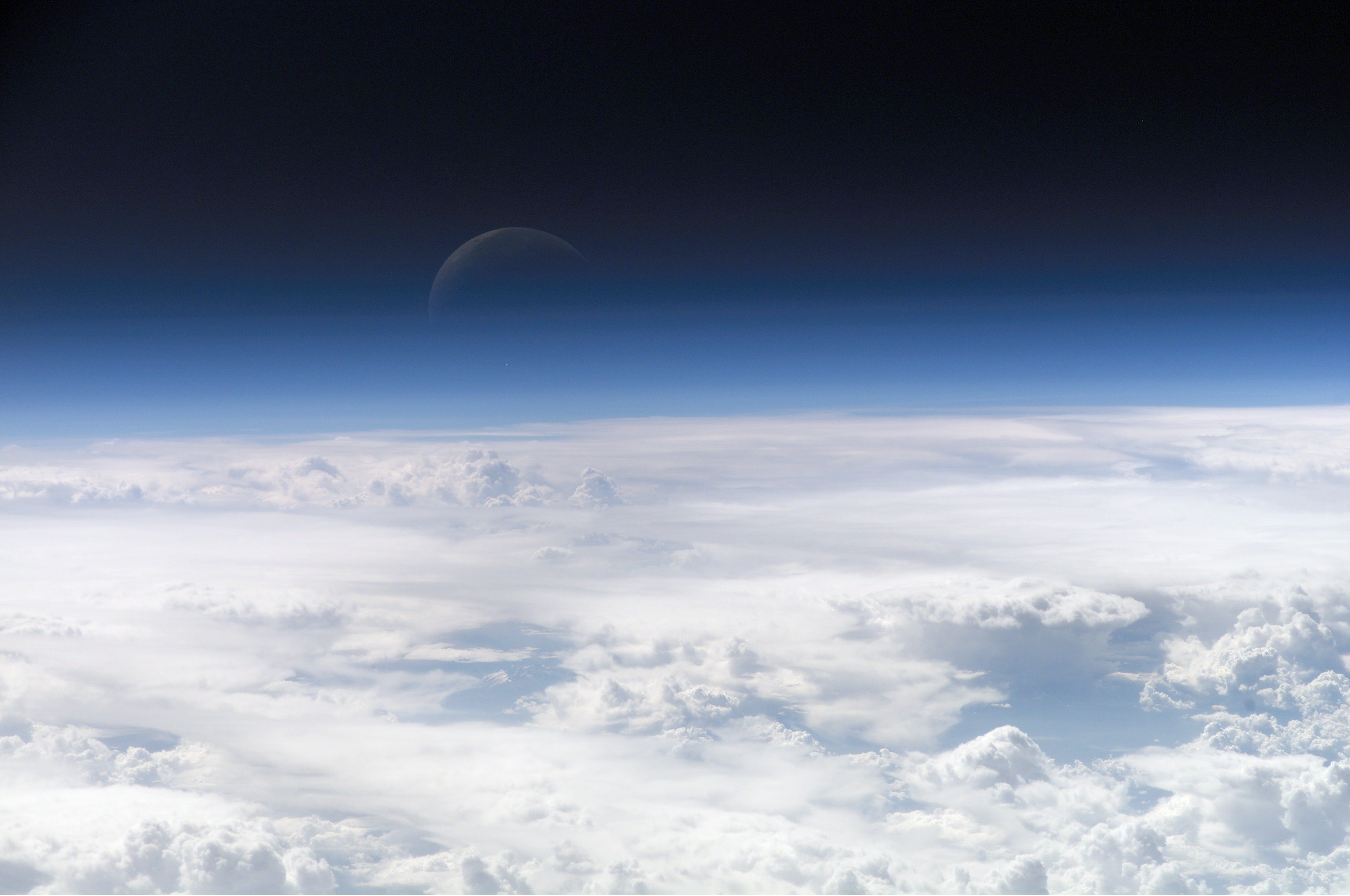
Outside Earth's atmosphere, the sky is black day and night.

An illustration of Olbers' paradox (see below)

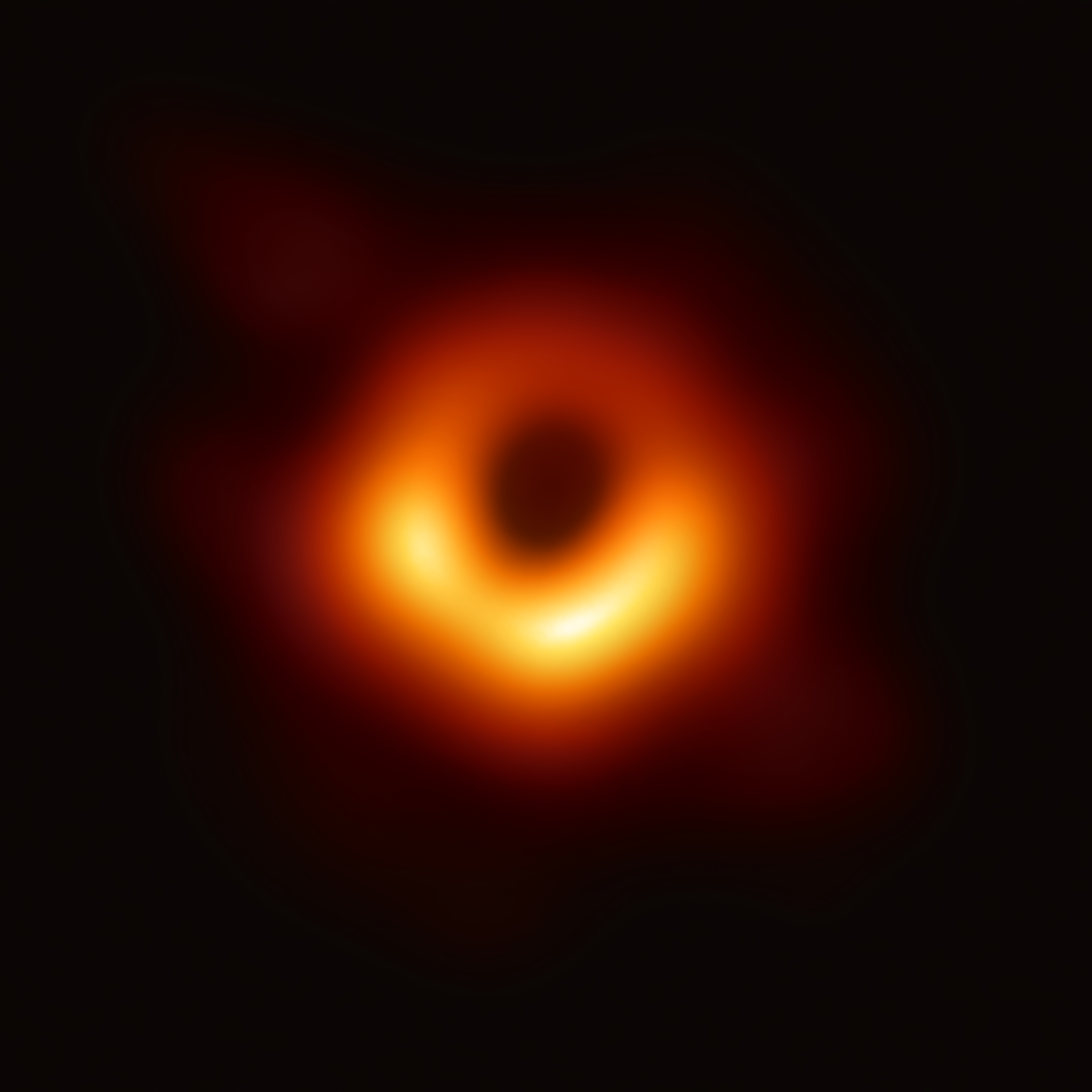
Image of the central black hole of Messier 87 taken by the Event Horizon Telescope.

==== Why the night sky and space are black – Olbers' paradox ====
The fact that outer space is black is sometimes called Olbers' paradox. In theory, because the universe is full of stars, and is believed to be infinitely large, it would be expected that the light of an infinite number of stars would be enough to brilliantly light the whole universe all the time. However, the background color of outer space is black. This contradiction was first noted in 1823 by German astronomer Heinrich Wilhelm Matthias Olbers, who posed the question of why the night sky was black.

The current accepted answer is that, although the universe may be infinitely large, it is not infinitely old. It is thought to be about 13.8 billion years old, so we can only see objects as far away as the distance light can travel in 13.8 billion years. Light from stars farther away has not reached Earth, and cannot contribute to making the sky bright. Furthermore, as the universe is expanding, many stars are moving away from Earth. As they move, the wavelength of their light becomes longer, through the Doppler effect, and shifts toward red, or even becomes invisible. As a result of these two phenomena, there is not enough starlight to make space anything but black.

The daytime sky on Earth is blue because light from the Sun strikes molecules in Earth's atmosphere scattering light in all directions. Blue light is scattered more than other colors, and reaches the eye in greater quantities, making the daytime sky appear blue. This is known as Rayleigh scattering.

The nighttime sky on Earth is black because the part of Earth experiencing night is facing away from the Sun, the light of the Sun is blocked by Earth itself, and there is no other bright nighttime source of light in the vicinity. Thus, there is not enough light to undergo Rayleigh scattering and make the sky blue. On the Moon, on the other hand, because there is virtually no atmosphere to scatter the light, the sky is black both day and night. This also holds true for other locations without an atmosphere, such as Mercury.

=== Biology ===
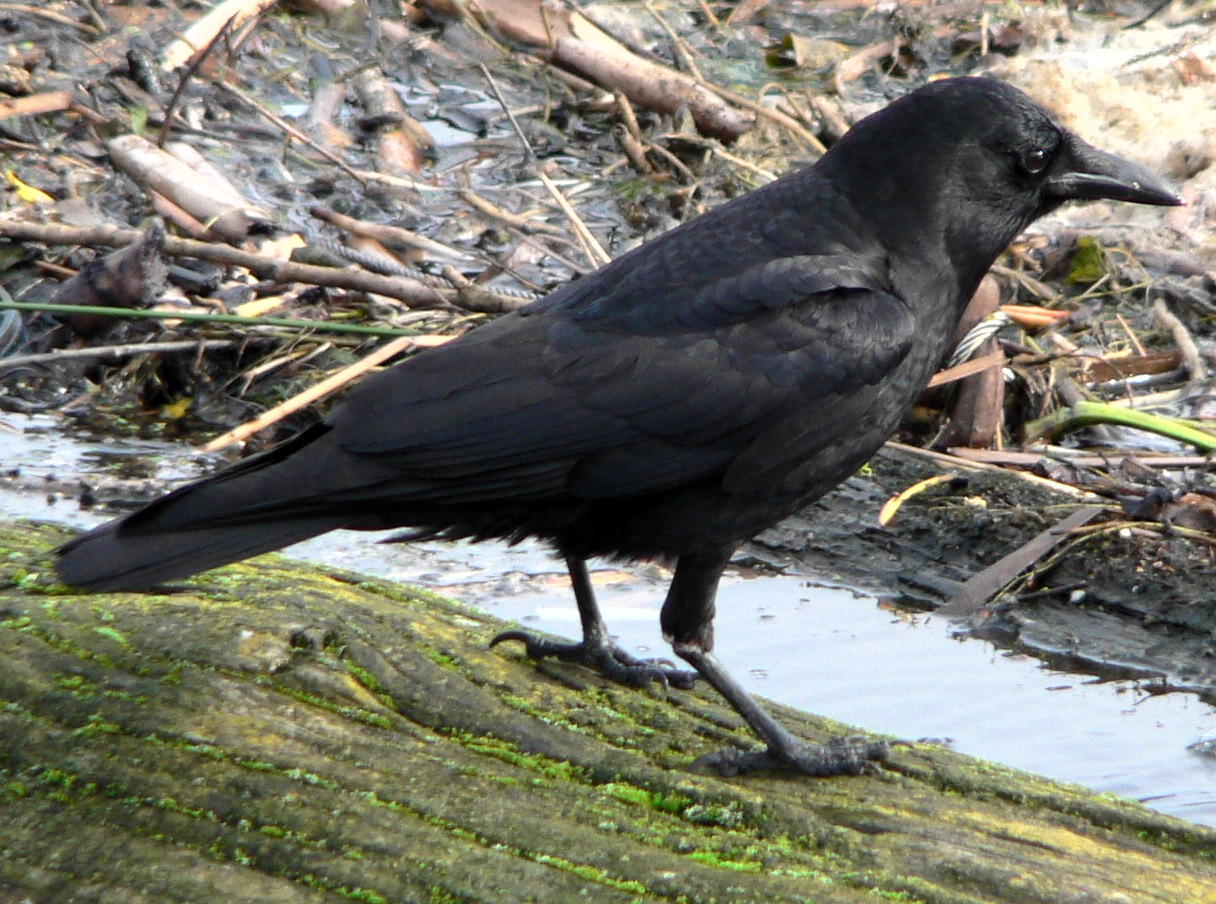
The American crow is one of the most intelligent of all animals.

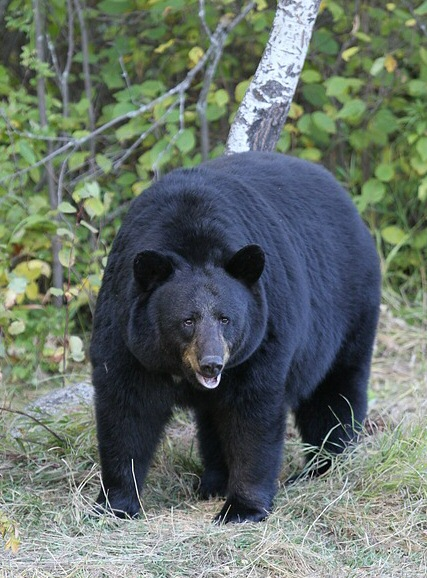
American black bear (Ursus americanus) near Riding Mountain Park, Manitoba, Canada

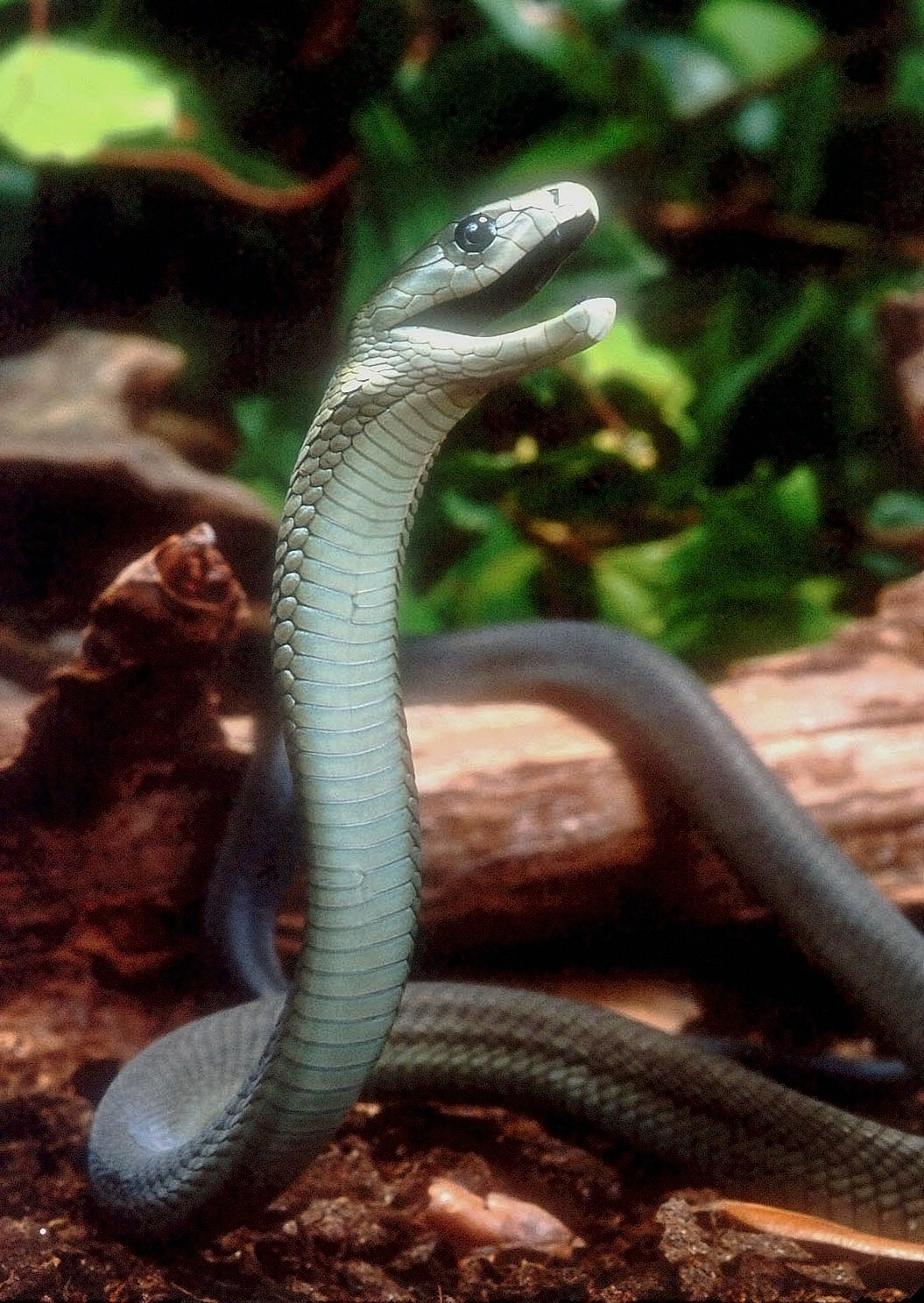
The black mamba of Africa is one of the most venomous snakes, as well as the fastest-moving snake in the world.

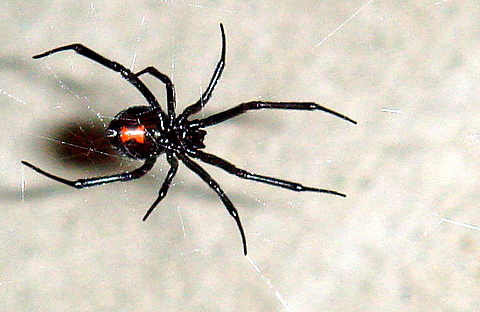
The black widow spider, or latrodectus, The females frequently eat their male partners after mating. The female's venom is at least three times more potent than that of the males, making a male's self-defense bite ineffective.

A black panther is actually a melanistic leopard or jaguar, the result of an excess of melanin in their skin caused by a recessive gene.

== Culture ==
In China, the color black is associated with water, one of the five fundamental elements believed to compose all things; and with winter, cold, and the direction north, usually symbolized by a black tortoise. It is also associated with disorder, including the positive disorder which leads to change and new life. When the first emperor of China Qin Shi Huang seized power from the Zhou dynasty, he changed the Imperial color from red to black, saying that black extinguished red. Only when the Han dynasty appeared in 206 BC was red restored as the imperial color.

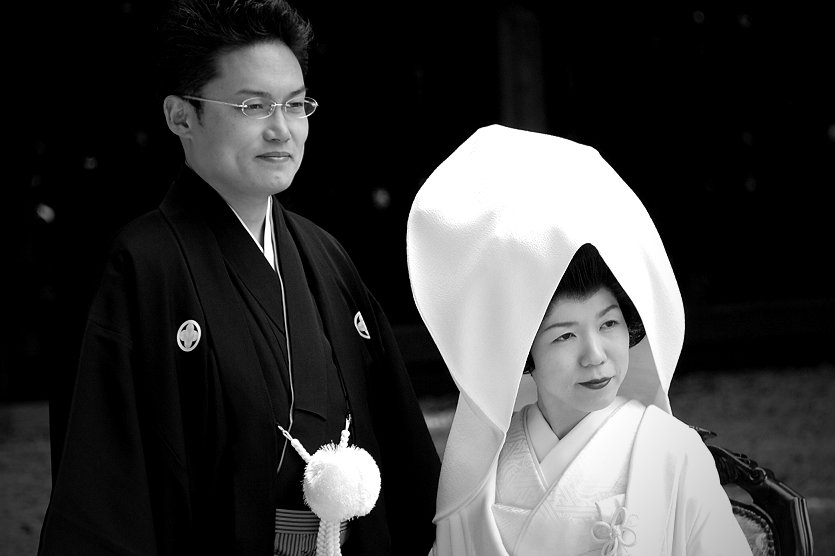
Japanese men traditionally wear a black kimono with some white decoration on their wedding day

In Japan, black is associated with mystery, the night, the unknown, the supernatural, the invisible and death. Combined with white, it can symbolize intuition. In 10th- and 11th-century Japan, it was believed that wearing black could bring misfortune. It was worn at court by those who wanted to set themselves apart from the established powers or who had renounced material possessions.

In Japan black can also symbolize experience, as opposed to white, which symbolizes naiveté. The black belt in martial arts symbolizes experience, while a white belt is worn by novices. Japanese men traditionally wear a black kimono with some white decoration on their wedding day.

Black is associated with depth in Indonesia, as well as the subterranean world, demons, disaster, and the left hand. When combined with white, however, it symbolizes harmony and equilibrium.

=== Political movements ===
==== Anarchism ====
Anarchism is a political philosophy, most popular in the late 19th and early 20th centuries, which holds that governments and capitalism (Note: With the exception of anarcho-capitalism, though this is contested as being "true" anarchism.) are harmful and undesirable. The symbols of anarchism was usually either a black flag or a black letter A. More recently it is usually represented with a bisected red and black flag, to emphasize the movement's socialist roots in the First International. Anarchism was most popular in Spain, France, Italy, Ukraine and Argentina. There were also small but influential movements in the United States, Russia and many other countries all around the world.

==== Fascism ====
The Blackshirts (Italian: camicie nere, 'CCNN) were Fascist paramilitary groups in Italy during the period immediately following World War I and until the end of World War II. The Blackshirts were officially known as the Voluntary Militia for National Security (Milizia Volontaria per la Sicurezza Nazionale, or MVSN).

Inspired by the black uniforms of the Arditi, Italy's elite storm troops of World War I, the Fascist Blackshirts were organized by Benito Mussolini as the military tool of his political movement. They used violence and intimidation against Mussolini's opponents. The emblem of the Italian fascists was a black flag with fasces, an axe in a bundle of sticks, an ancient Roman symbol of authority. Mussolini came to power in 1922 through his March on Rome with the blackshirts.

Black was also adopted by Adolf Hitler and the Nazis in Germany. Red, white and black were the colors of the flag of the German Empire from 1870 to 1918. In Mein Kampf, Hitler explained that they were "revered colors expressive of our homage to the glorious past". Hitler also wrote that "the new flag ... should prove effective as a large poster" because "in hundreds of thousands of cases a really striking emblem may be the first cause of awakening interest in a movement". The black swastika was meant to symbolize the Aryan race, which, according to the Nazis, "was always anti-Semitic and will always be anti-Semitic." Several designs by a number of different authors were considered, but the one adopted in the end was Hitler's personal design. Black became the color of the uniform of the SS, the Schutzstaffel or "defense corps", the paramilitary wing of the Nazi Party, and was worn by SS officers from 1932 until the end of World War II.

The Nazis used a black triangle to symbolize anti-social elements. The symbol originates from Nazi concentration camps, where every prisoner had to wear one of the Nazi concentration camp badges on their jacket, the color of which categorized them according to "their kind". Many Black Triangle prisoners were either mentally disabled or mentally ill. The homeless were also included, as were alcoholics, the Romani people, the habitually "work-shy", prostitutes, draft dodgers and pacifists. More recently the black triangle has been adopted as a symbol in lesbian culture and by disabled activists.

Black shirts were also worn by the British Union of Fascists before World War II, and members of fascist movements in the Netherlands.

==== Patriotic resistance ====
The Lützow Free Corps, composed of volunteer German students and academics fighting against Napoleon in 1813, could not afford to make special uniforms and therefore adopted black, as the only color that could be used to dye their civilian clothing without the original color showing. In 1815 the students began to carry a red, black and gold flag, which they believed (incorrectly) had been the colors of the Holy Roman Empire (the imperial flag had actually been gold and black). In 1848, this banner became the flag of the German confederation. In 1866, Prussia unified Germany under its rule, and imposed the red, white and black of its own flag, which remained the colors of the German flag until the end of the Second World War. In 1949 the Federal Republic of Germany returned to the original flag and colors of the students and professors of 1815, which is the flag of Germany today.

A flag used by the Revolutionary Insurgent Army of Ukraine during the Russian Civil War. It says, "Power begets parasites. Long live Anarchy!"

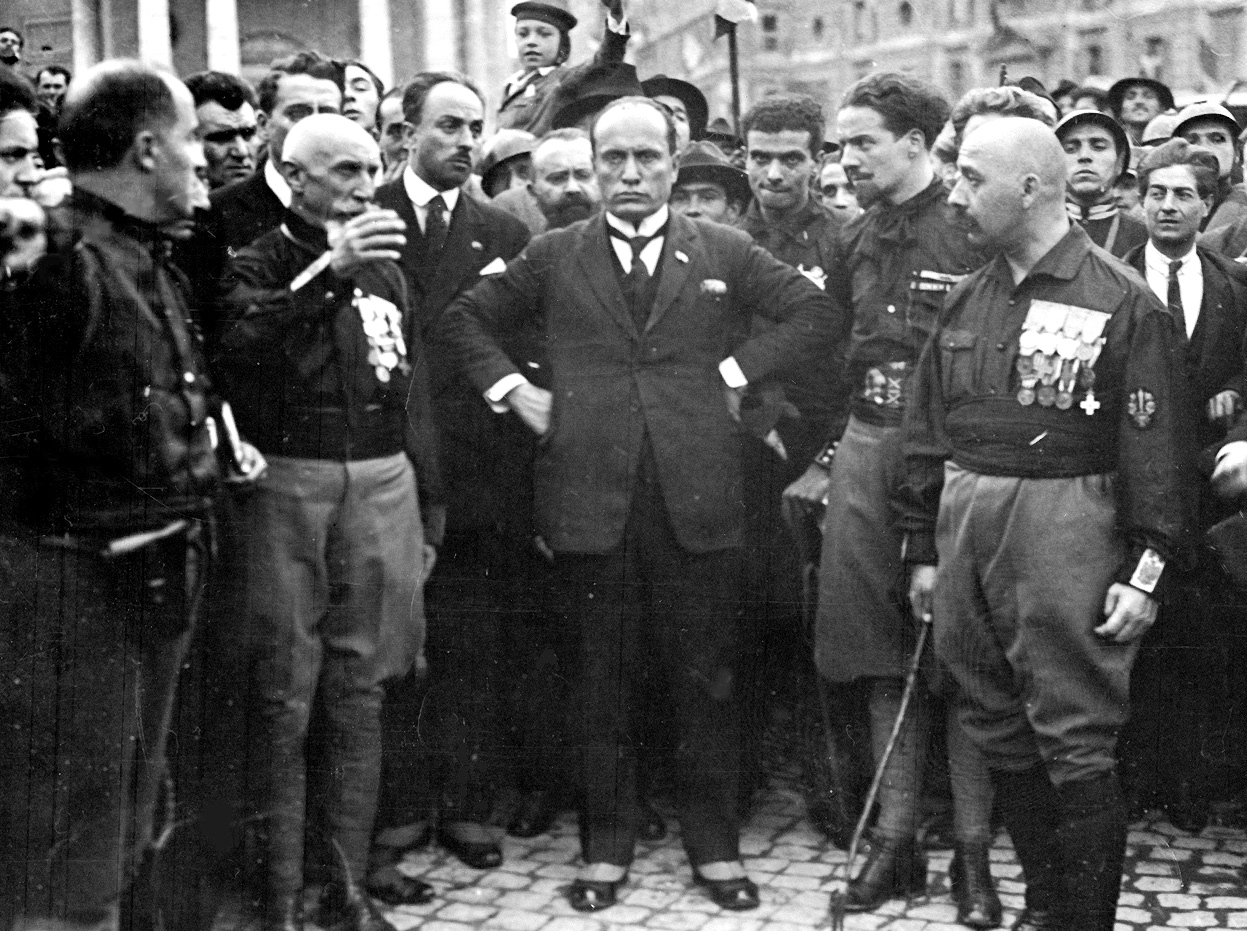
Benito Mussolini and his blackshirt followers during his March on Rome in 1922.

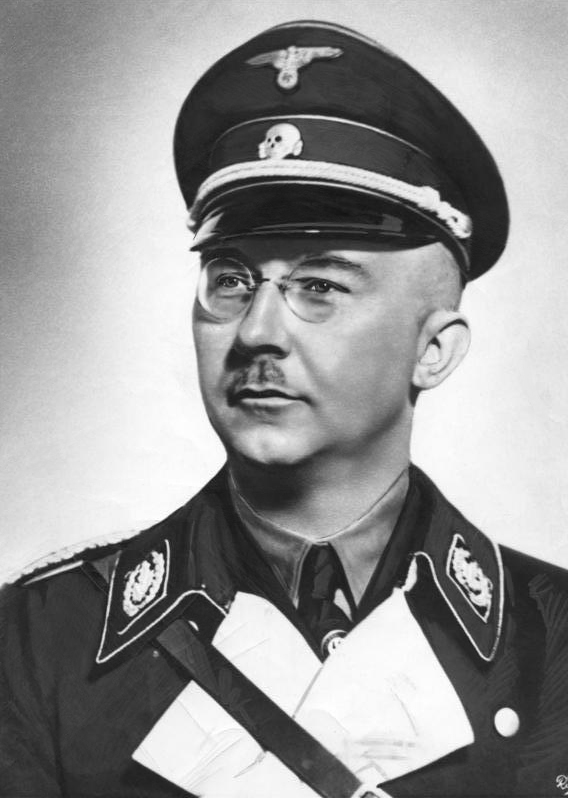
Black uniform of Heinrich Himmler, head of the SS, the military wing of the Nazi Party (1938).

=== Military ===
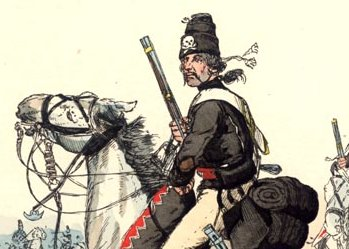
Hussar from Husaren-Regiment Nr.5 (von Ruesch) in 1744 with the Totenkopf on the mirliton (ger. Flügelmütze).

Black has been a traditional color of cavalry and armoured or mechanized troops. German armoured troops (Panzerwaffe) traditionally wore black uniforms, and even in others, a black beret is common. In Finland, black is the symbolic color for both armoured troops and combat engineers, and military units of these specialities have black flags and unit insignia.

The black beret and the color black is also a symbol of special forces in many countries. Soviet and Russian OMON special police and Russian naval infantry wear a black beret. A black beret is also worn by military police in the Canadian, Czech, Croatian, Portuguese, Spanish and Serbian armies.

The silver-on-black skull and crossbones symbol or Totenkopf and a black uniform were used by Hussars and Black Brunswickers, the German Panzerwaffe and the Nazi Schutzstaffel, and U.S. 400th Missile Squadron (crossed missiles), and continues in use with the Estonian Kuperjanov Battalion.

=== Religion ===
In Christian theology, black was the color of the universe before God created light. In many religious cultures, from Mesoamerica to Oceania to India and Japan, the world was created out of a primordial darkness. In the Bible the light of faith and Christianity is often contrasted with the darkness of ignorance and paganism.

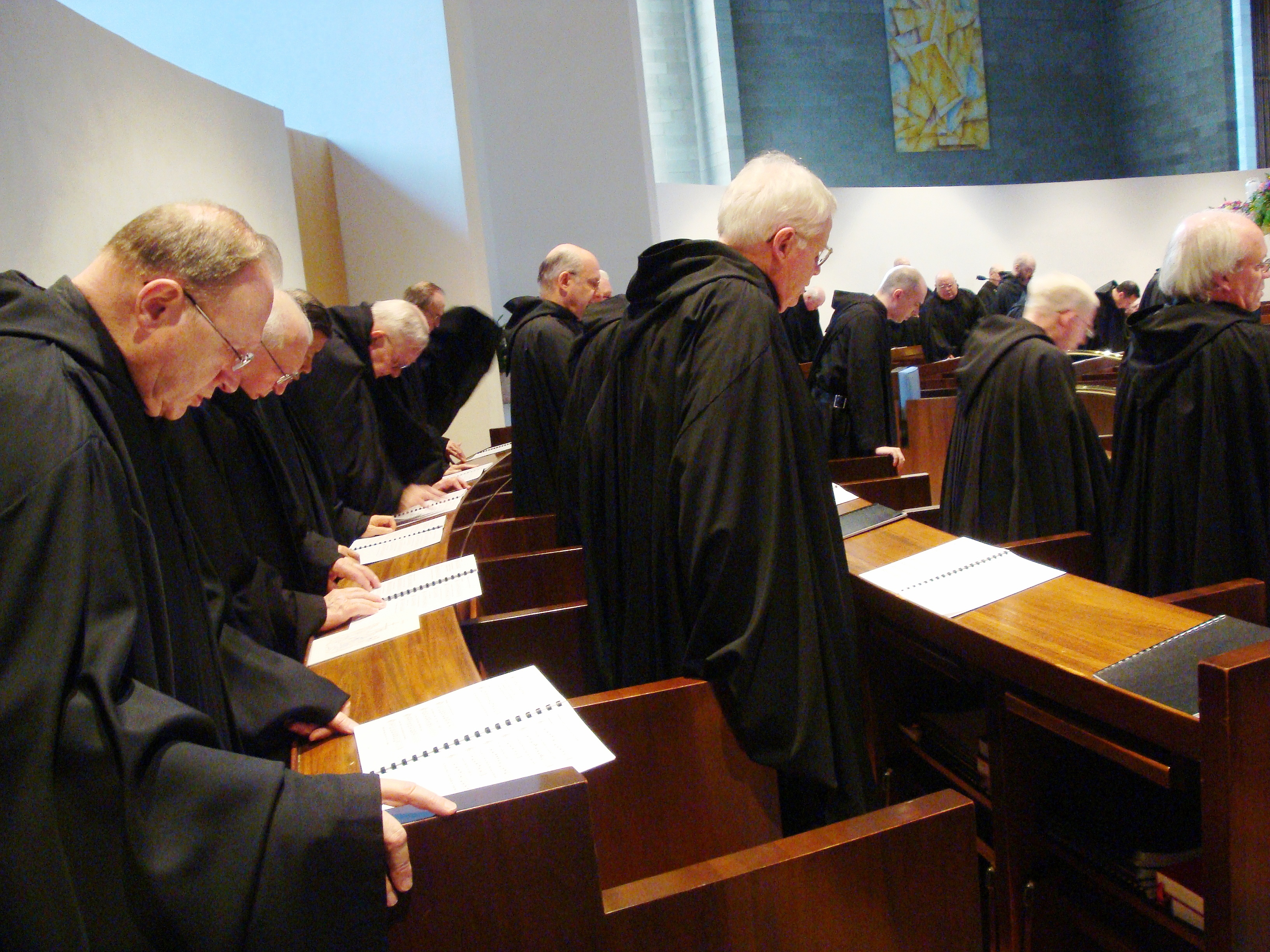
Modern-day monks of the Order of Saint Benedict in New Jersey

In Christianity, the devil is often called the "prince of darkness". The term was used in John Milton's poem Paradise Lost, published in 1667, referring to Satan, who is viewed as the embodiment of evil. It is an English translation of the Latin phrase princeps tenebrarum, which occurs in the Acts of Pilate, written in the fourth century, in the 11th-century hymn Rhythmus de die mortis by Pietro Damiani, and in a sermon by Bernard of Clairvaux from the 12th century. The phrase also occurs in King Lear by William Shakespeare (c. 1606), Act III, Scene IV, l. 14: 'The prince of darkness is a gentleman."

Priests and pastors of the Roman Catholic, Eastern Orthodox and Protestant churches commonly wear black, as do monks of the Benedictine Order, who consider it the color of humility and penitence.

The Royal Black Institution, a Protestant fraternity, is associated with the colour black, wearing the colour is a reminder that it is associated with death, mortality and being saved by God.

- In Islam, black, along with green, plays an important symbolic role. It is the color of the Black Standard, the banner that is said to have been carried by the soldiers of Muhammad. It is also used as a symbol in Shi'a Islam (heralding the advent of the Mahdi and the flag of followers of Islamism and Jihadism).
- In Hinduism, the goddess Kali, goddess of time and change, is portrayed with black or dark blue skin. wearing a necklace adorned with severed heads and hands. Her name means "The black one". She destroys anger and passion according to Hindu mythology and her devotees are supposed to abstain from meat or intoxication. Kali does not eat meat, but it is the śāstra's injunction that those who are unable to give up meat-eating, they may sacrifice one goat, not cow, one small animal before the goddess Kali, on amāvāsya (new moon) day, night, not day, and they can eat it.
- In Modern Paganism, black represents dignity, force, stability, and protection. The color is often used to banish and release negative energies, or binding. An athame is a ceremonial blade often having a black handle, which is used in some forms of witchcraft.
- In Aztec religion, black is linked to the diety Tezcatlipoca, associated with the night sky, obsidian, violence and sometimes represented as a black jaguar or "smoking mirror".

=== Sports ===
- The national rugby union team of New Zealand is called the All Blacks, in reference to their black outfits, and the color is also shared by other New Zealand national teams such as the Black Caps (cricket) and the Kiwis (rugby league).
- Association football (soccer) referees traditionally wear all-black uniforms, however nowadays other uniform colors may also be worn.
- In auto racing, a black flag signals a driver to go into the pits.
- In baseball, "the black" refers to the batter's eye, a blacked out area around the center-field bleachers, painted black to give hitters a decent background for pitched balls.
- A large number of teams have uniforms designed with black colors even when the team does not normally feature that color. Many feel the color sometimes imparts a psychological advantage in its wearers. Black is used by numerous professional and collegiate sports teams.

=== Idioms and expressions ===
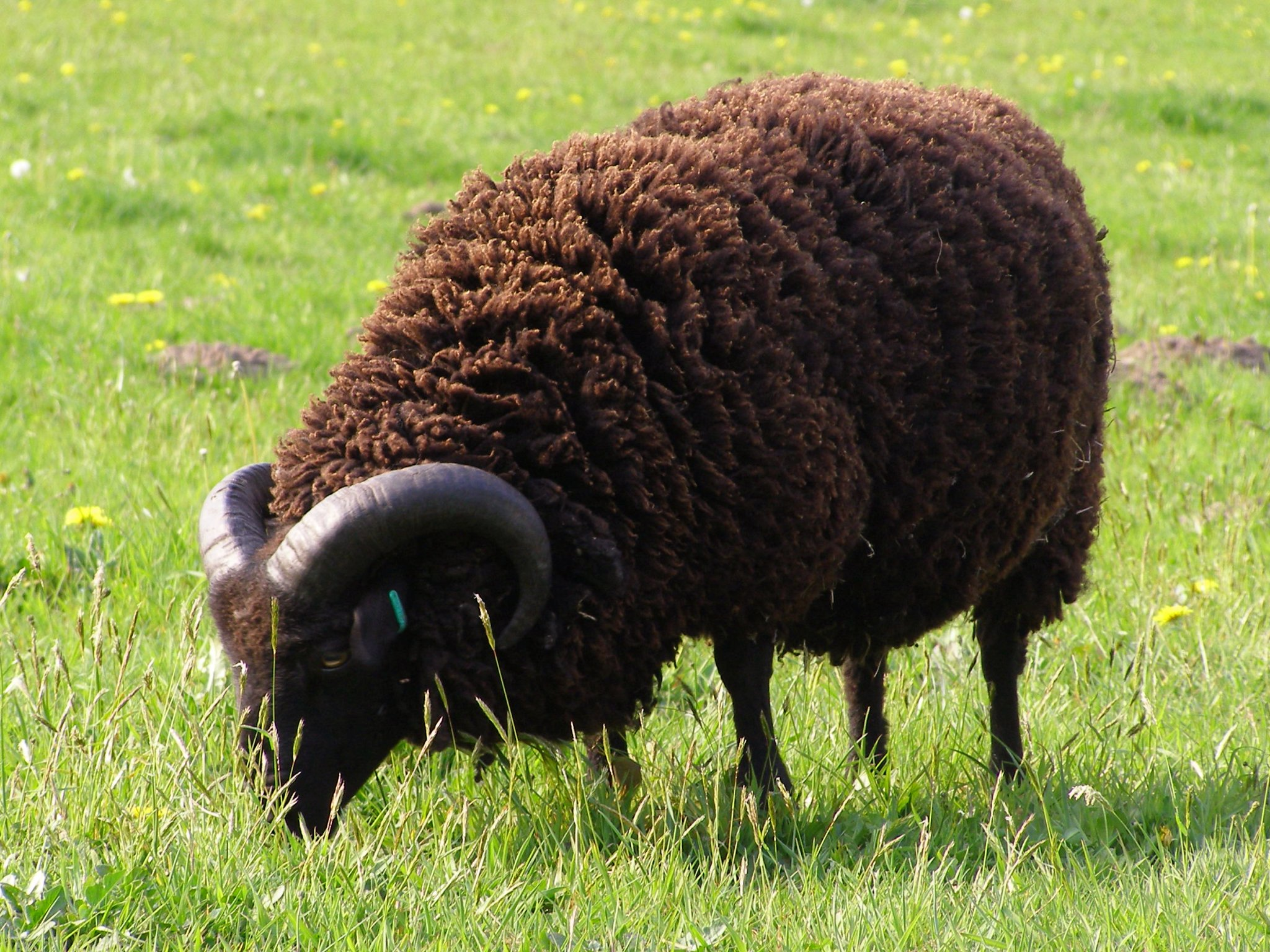
Namesake of the idiom "black sheep"

- In general, the Negro race of African origin is called "Black", while the Caucasian race of European origin is called "White".
- In the United States, "Black Friday" (the day after Thanksgiving Day, the fourth Thursday in November) is traditionally the busiest shopping day of the year. Many Americans are on holiday because of Thanksgiving, and many retailers open earlier and close later than normal, and offer special prices. The day's name originated in Philadelphia sometime before 1961, and originally was used to describe the heavy and disruptive downtown pedestrian and vehicle traffic which would occur on that day. Later an alternative explanation began to be offered: that "Black Friday" indicates the point in the year that retailers begin to turn a profit, or are "in the black", because of the large volume of sales on that day.
- "In the black" means profitable. Accountants originally used black ink in ledgers to indicate profit, and red ink to indicate a loss.
- Black Friday also refers to any particularly disastrous day on financial markets. The first Black Friday (1869), 24 September 1869, was caused by the efforts of two speculators, Jay Gould and James Fisk, to corner the gold market on the New York Gold Exchange.
- A blacklist is a list of undesirable persons or entities (to be placed on the list is to be "blacklisted").
- Black comedy is a form of comedy dealing with morbid and serious topics. The expression is similar to black humor or black humour.
- A black mark against a person relates to something bad they have done.
- A black mood is a bad one (cf Winston Churchill's clinical depression, which he called "my black dog").
- Black market is used to denote the trade of illegal goods, or alternatively the illegal trade of otherwise legal items at considerably higher prices, e.g. to evade rationing.
- Black propaganda is the use of known falsehoods, partial truths, or masquerades in propaganda to confuse an opponent.
- Blackmail is the act of threatening someone to do something that would hurt them in some way, such as by revealing sensitive information about them, in order to force the threatened party to fulfill certain demands. Ordinarily, such a threat is illegal.
- If the black eight-ball, in billiards, is sunk before all others are out of play, the player loses.
- The black sheep of the family is the ne'er-do-well.
- To blackball someone is to block their entry into a club or some such institution. In the traditional English gentlemen's club, members vote on the admission of a candidate by secretly placing a white or black ball in a hat. If upon the completion of voting, there was even one black ball amongst the white, the candidate would be denied membership, and he would never know who had "blackballed" him.
- Black tea in the Western culture is known as "crimson tea" in Chinese and culturally influenced languages (紅茶, Mandarin Chinese hóngchá; Japanese kōcha; Korean hongcha).
- "The black" is a wildfire suppression term referring to a burned area on a wildfire capable of acting as a safety zone.
- Black coffee refers to coffee without sugar or cream.

== Associations and symbolism ==
=== Mourning ===
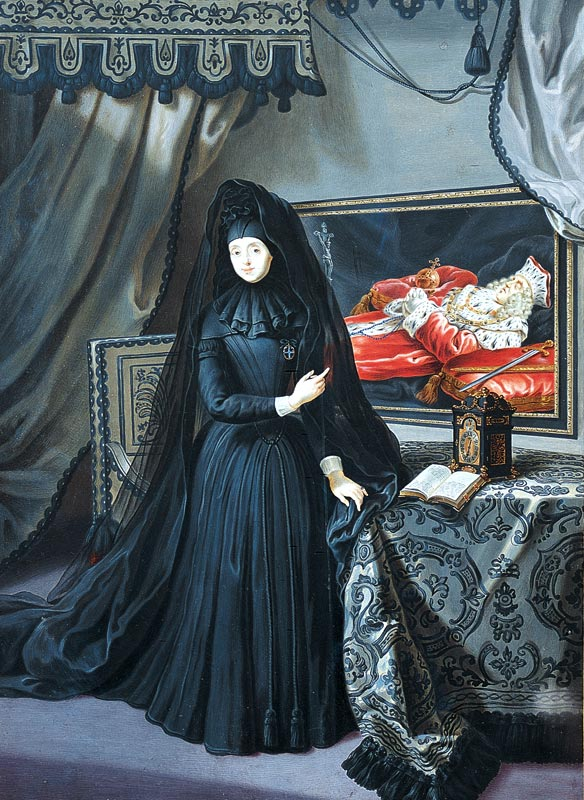
The Dowager Electress of Palatine in mourning (1717)

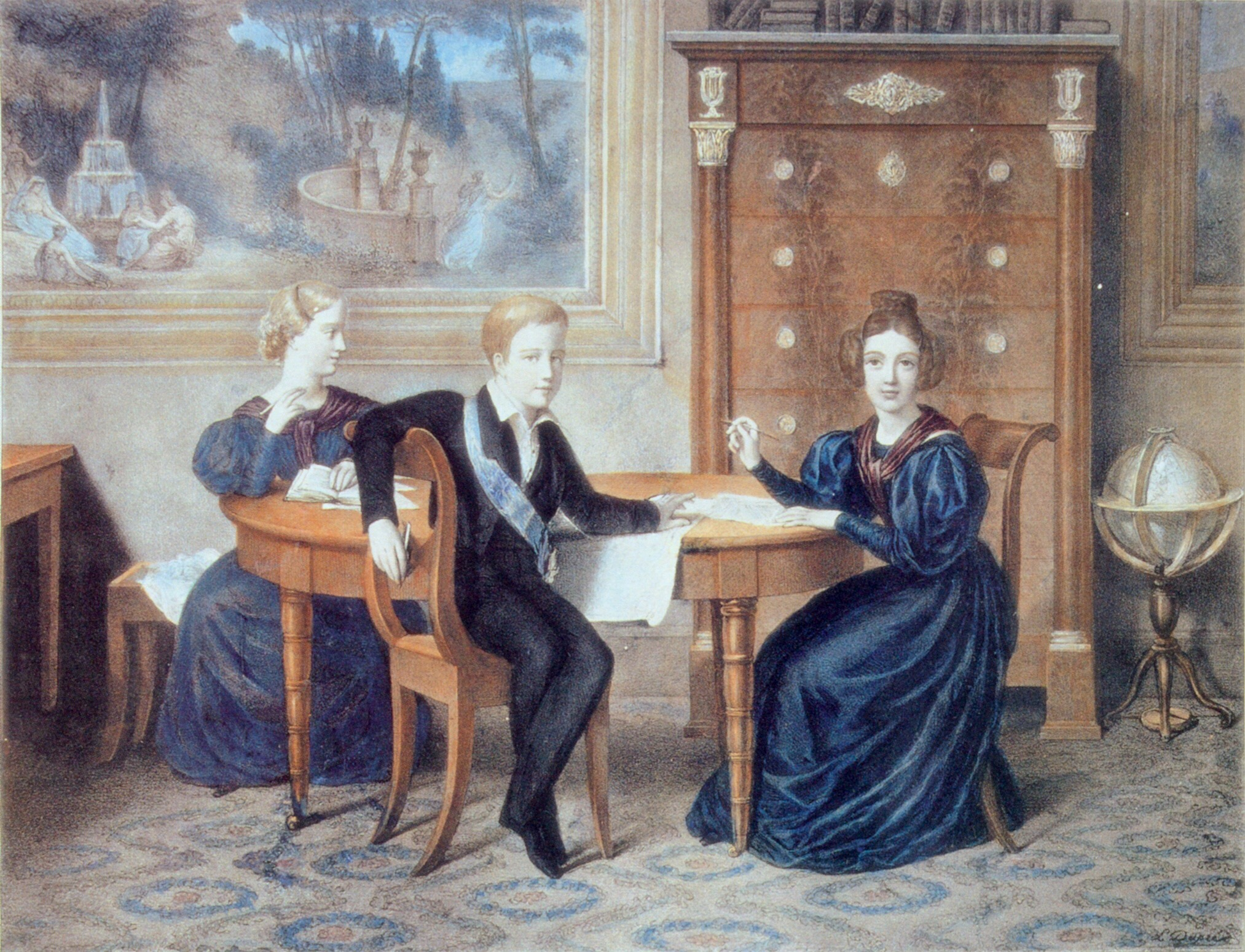
Emperor Pedro II of Brazil and his sisters wearing mourning clothes due to their father's death (1834)

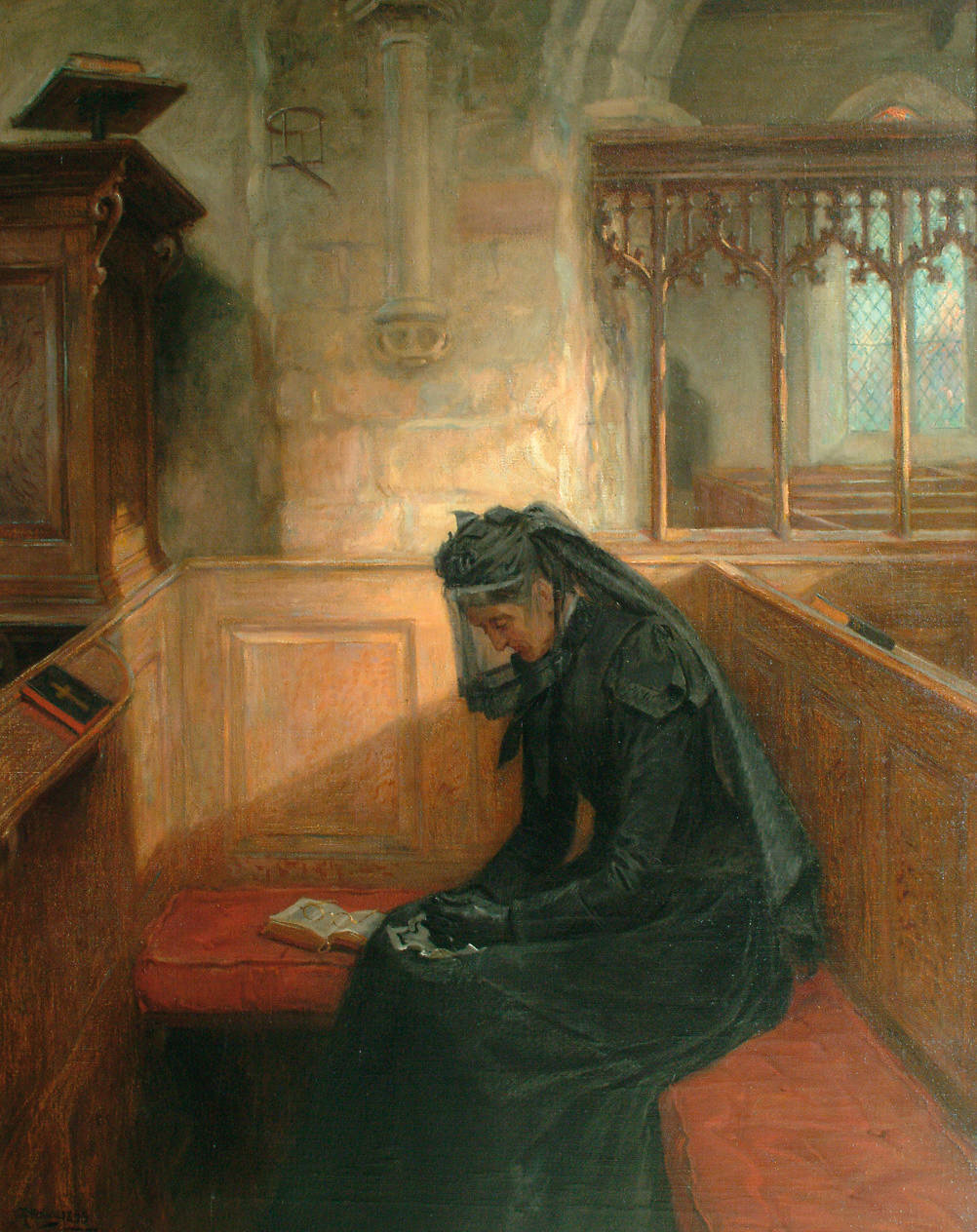
The Widow (1899) depicts a widow mourning

In the West, black is commonly associated with mourning and bereavement, and usually worn at funerals and memorial services. In some traditional societies, for example in Greece and Italy, some widows wear black for the rest of their lives. In contrast, across much of Africa and parts of Asia like Vietnam, white is a color of mourning.

A "black day" (or week or month) usually refers to tragic date. The Romans marked fasti days with white stones and nefasti days with black. The term is often used to remember massacres. Black months include the Black September in Jordan, when large numbers of Palestinians were killed, and Black July in Sri Lanka, the killing of members of the Tamil population by the Sinhalese government. In the financial world, the term often refers to a dramatic drop in the stock market. For example, the Wall Street crash of 1929, the stock market crash on 29 October 1929, which marked the start of the Great Depression, is nicknamed Black Tuesday, and was preceded by Black Thursday, a downturn on 24 October the previous week.

=== Darkness, evil, and the occult ===
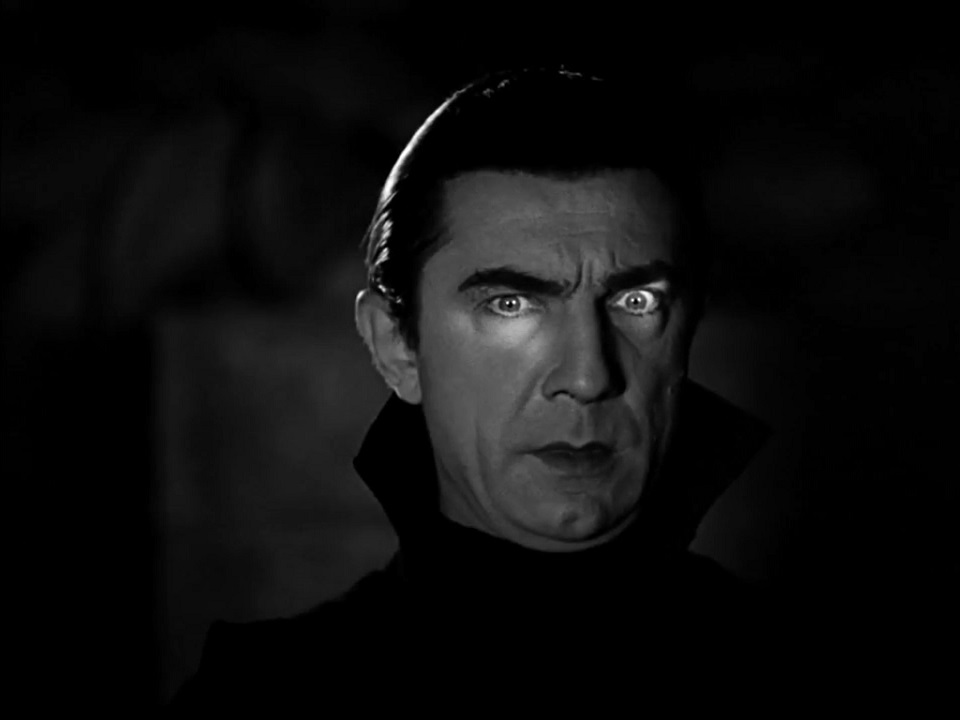
Count Dracula as portrayed by Bela Lugosi in the 1931 film version

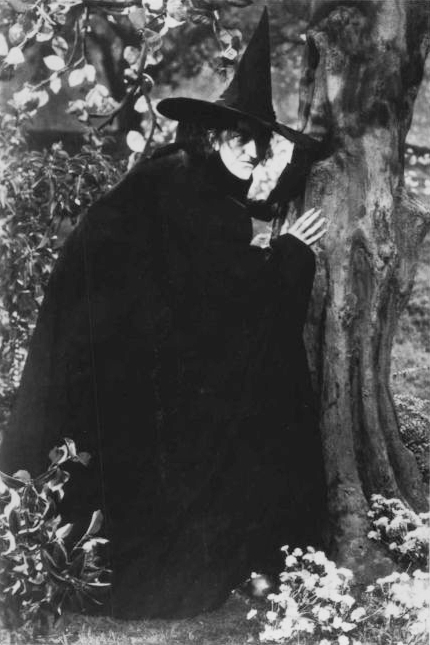
The Wicked Witch of the West as portrayed by Margaret Hamilton in The Wizard of Oz (1939)

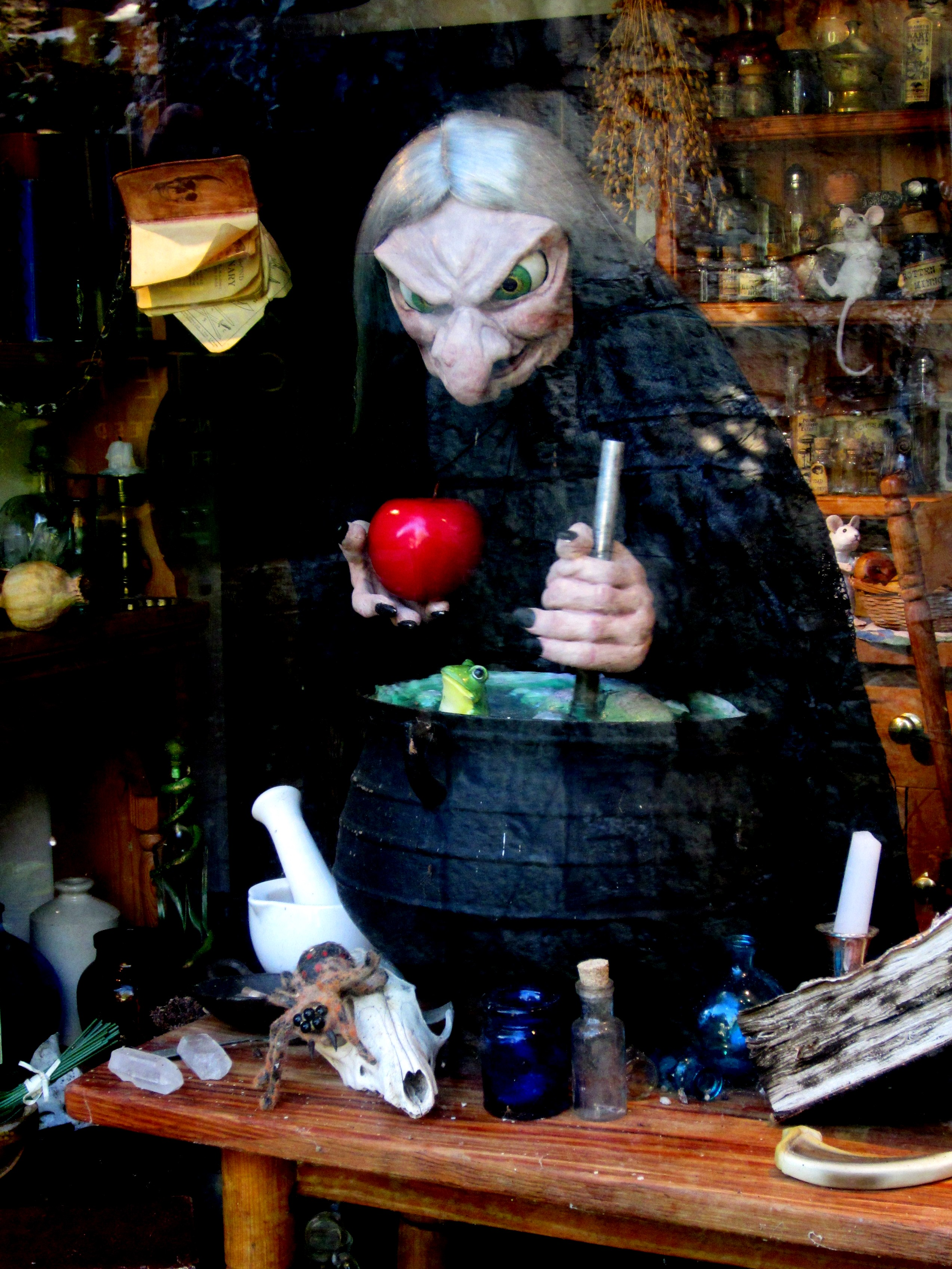
The witch from Snow White on display at the Old Smithy Gardens in Godshill, England

In western popular culture, black has long been associated with evil and darkness. It is the traditional color of witchcraft and black magic. The vampire of literature and films, such as Count Dracula of the Bram Stoker novel, dressed in black. The Wicked Witch of the West in the 1939 film The Wizard of Oz became the archetype of witches wearing black clothes including witch Halloween costumes.

=== Horror ===
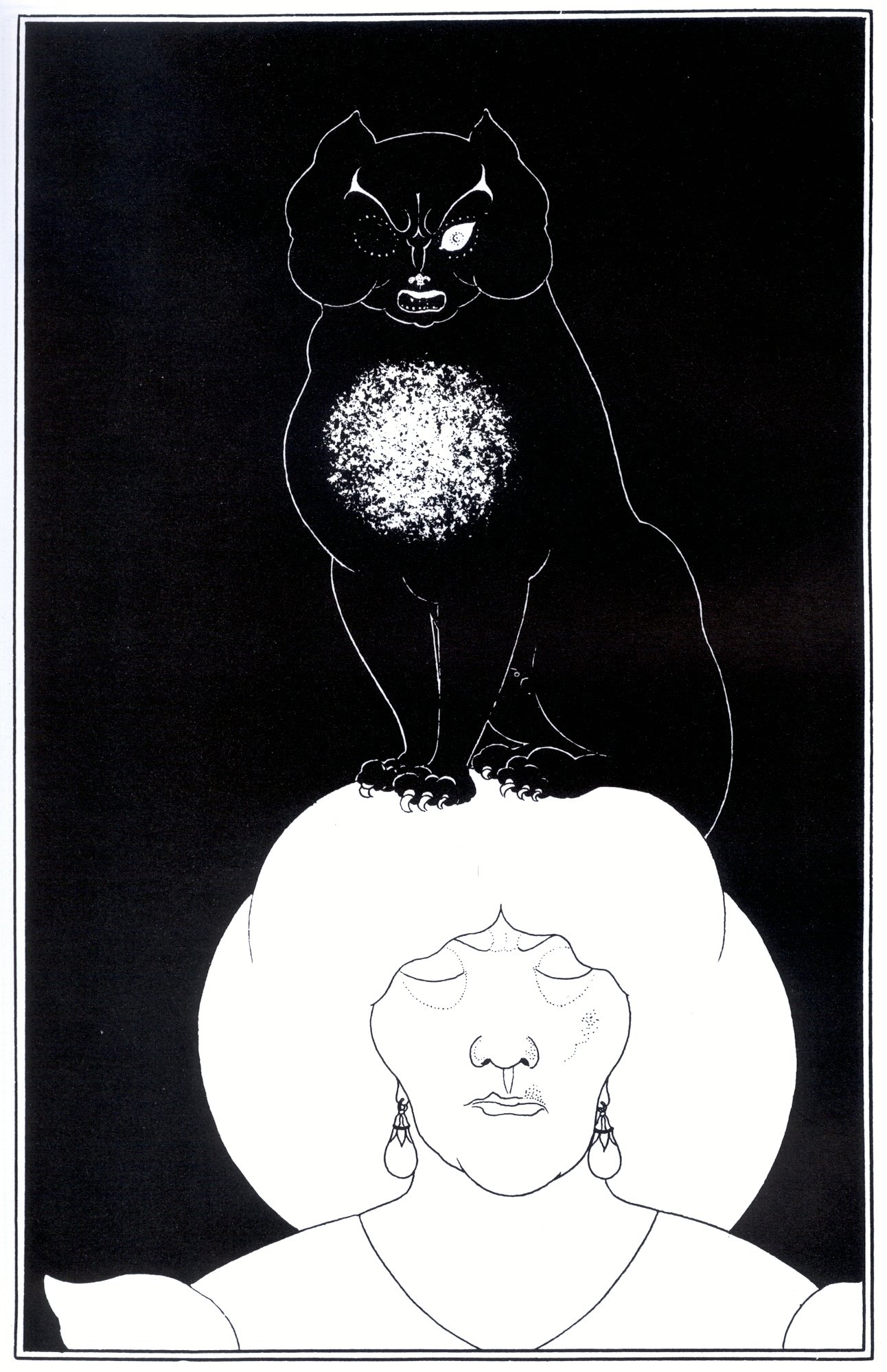
Illustration for "The Black Cat" by Aubrey Beardsley (1894–1895)

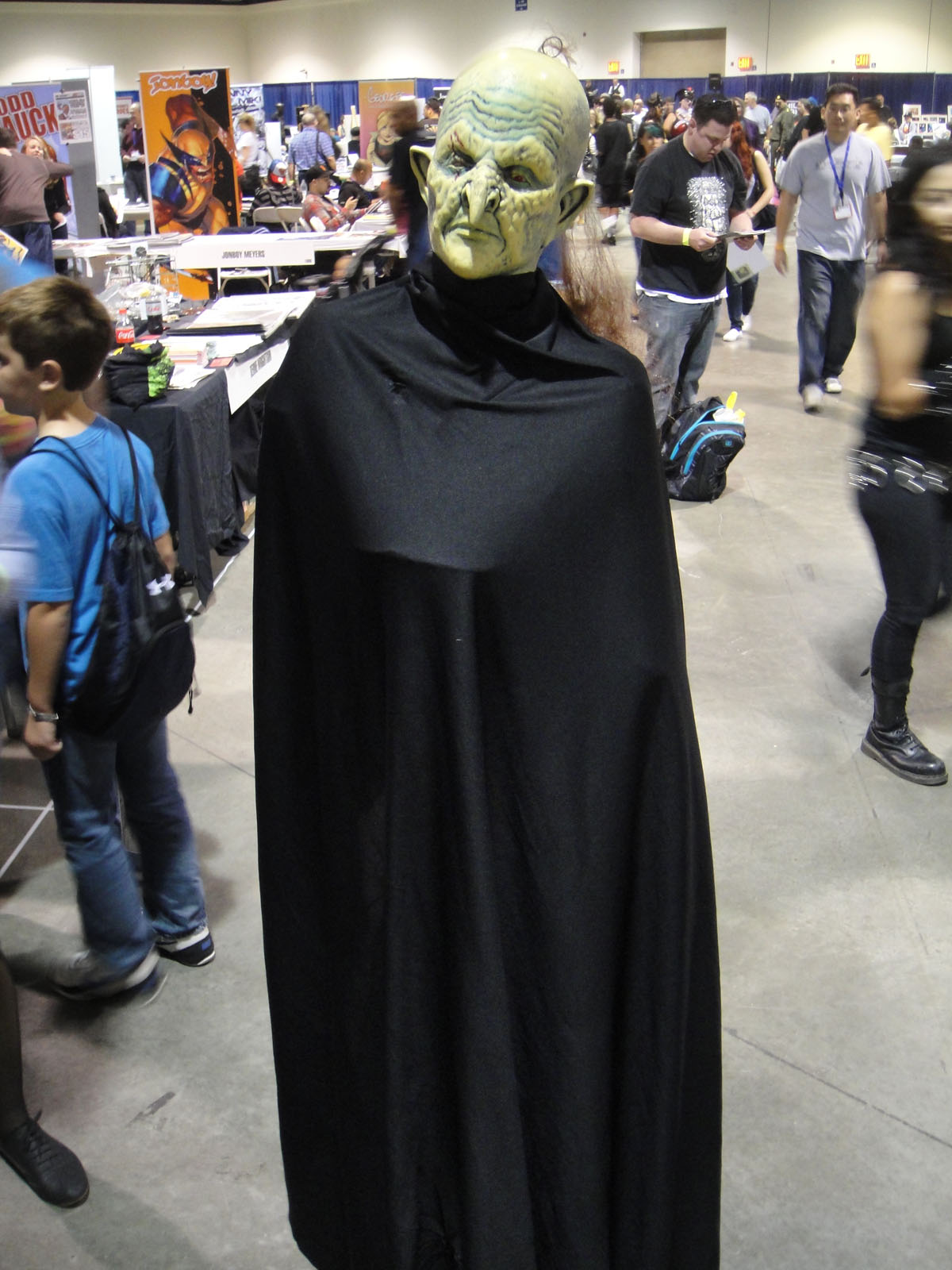
Person in a black witch costume at Long Beach Comic & Horror Con 2011

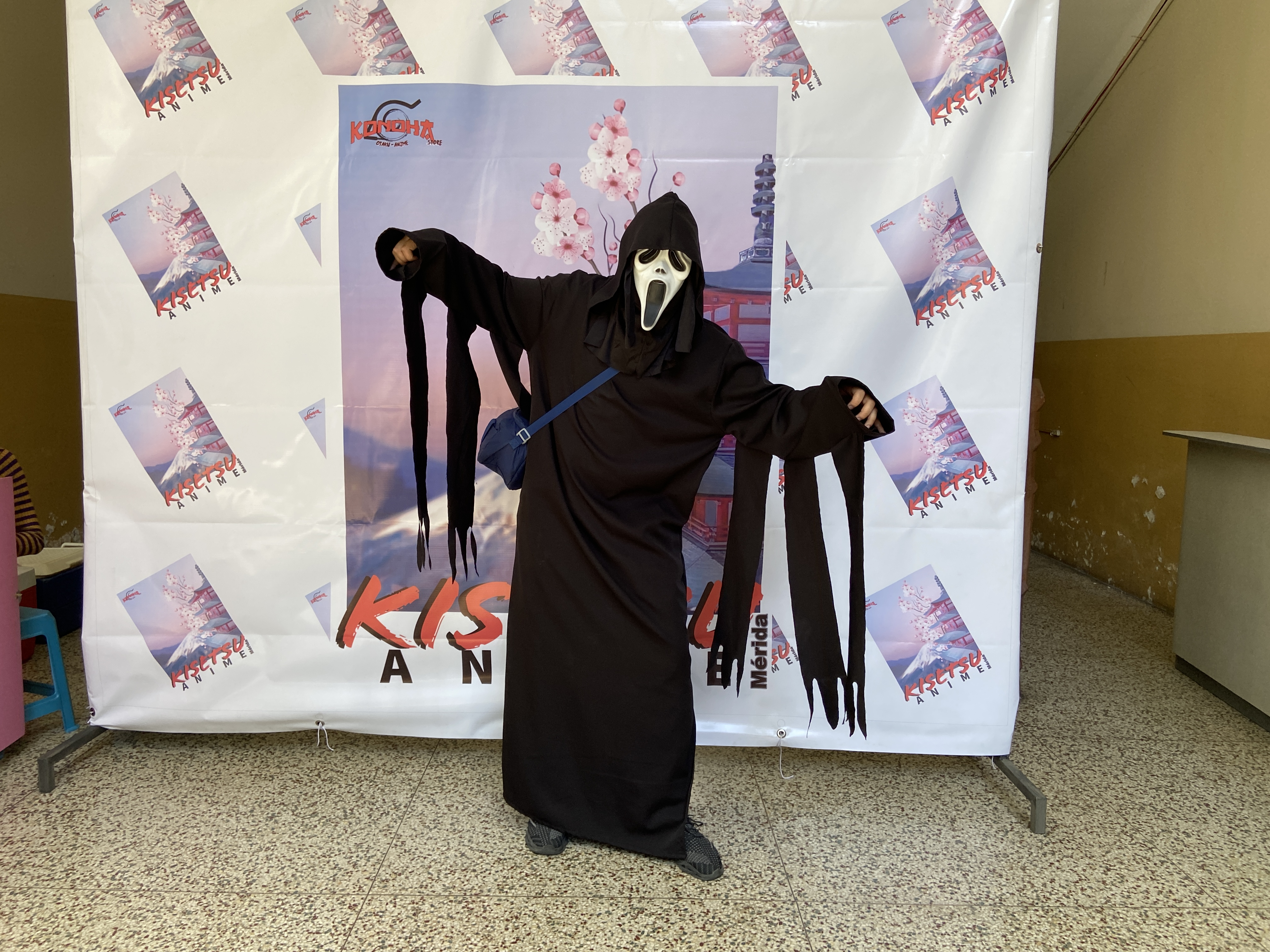
Person wearing a Ghostface costume

Black is associated with the horror genre. This association is due to the association of darkness with the color. An example of the color being used in a horror story is The Black Cat by Edgar Allan Poe. In the horror franchise, Scream, the main antagonist is a serial killer identity named Ghostface which wears a black cloak. It was originally white but was changed to black.

=== Power, authority and solemnity ===
Black is frequently used as a color of power, law and authority. In many countries judges and magistrates wear black robes. That custom began in Europe in the 13th and 14th centuries. Jurists, magistrates and certain other court officials in France began to wear long black robes during the reign of Philip IV of France (1285–1314), and in England from the time of Edward I (1271–1307). The custom spread to the cities of Italy at about the same time, between 1300 and 1320. The robes of judges resembled those worn by the clergy, and represented the law and authority of the King, while those of the clergy represented the law of God and authority of the church. Until the 20th century most police uniforms were black, until they were largely replaced by blue in France, the U.S. and other countries. In the United States, police cars are frequently Black and white. The riot control units of the Basque Autonomous Police in Spain are known as beltzak ("blacks") after their uniform.

Black formal attire is still worn at many solemn occasions or ceremonies, from graduations to formal balls. Graduation gowns are copied from the gowns worn by university professors in the Middle Ages, which in turn were copied from the robes worn by judges and priests, who often taught at the early universities. The mortarboard hat worn by graduates is adapted from a square cap called a biretta worn by Medieval professors and clerics.

=== Functionality ===
In the 19th and 20th centuries, many machines and devices, large and small, were painted black, to stress their functionality. These included telephones, sewing machines, steamships, railroad locomotives, and automobiles. The Ford Model T, the first mass-produced car, was available only in black from 1914 to 1926. Of means of transportation, only airplanes were rarely ever painted black.

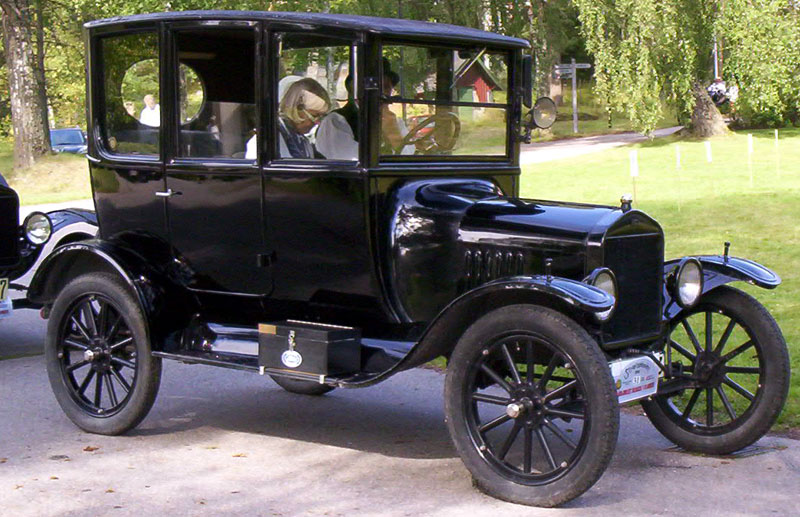
A 1920 Ford Model T

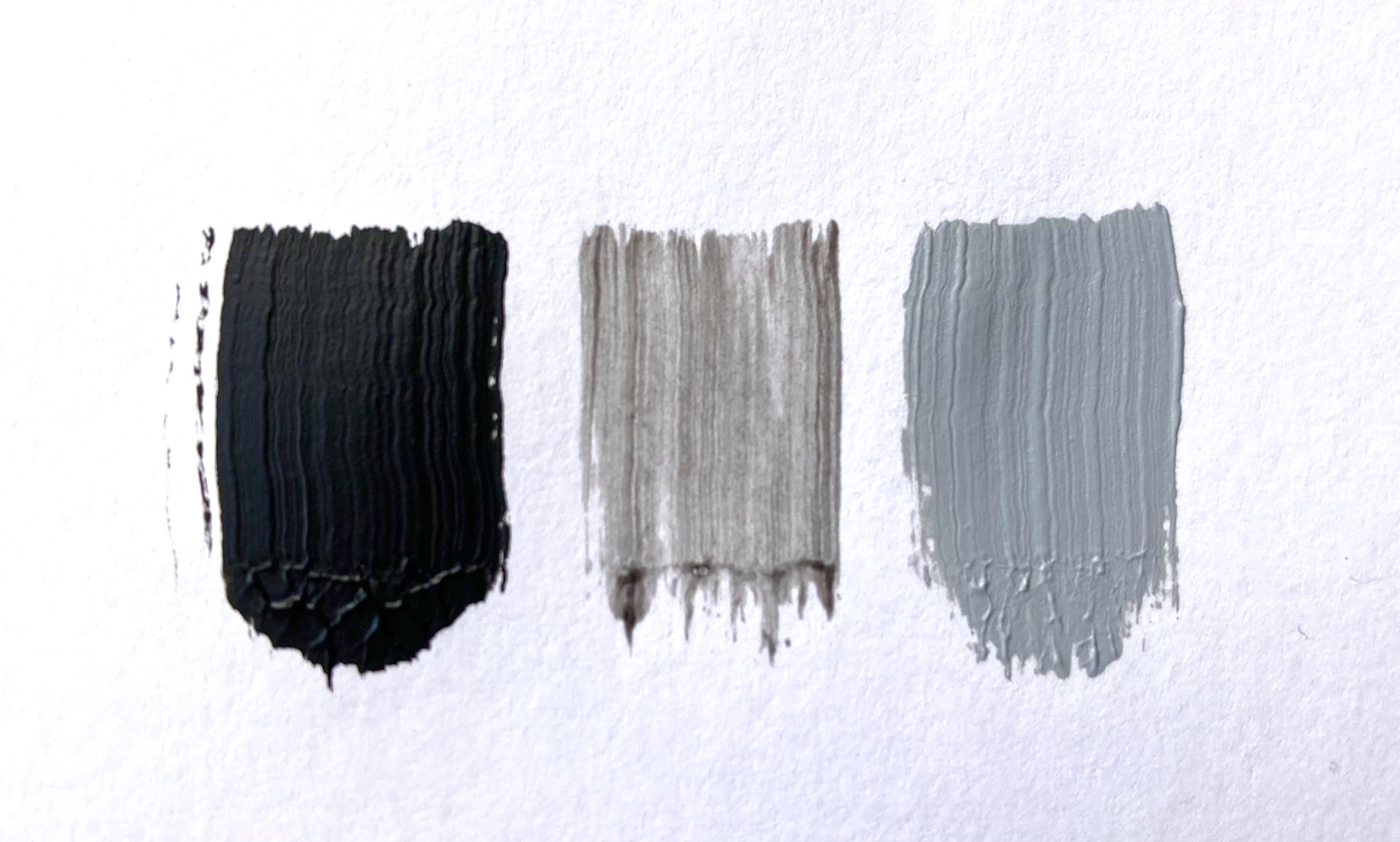
Black paint alongside two shades of gray paint

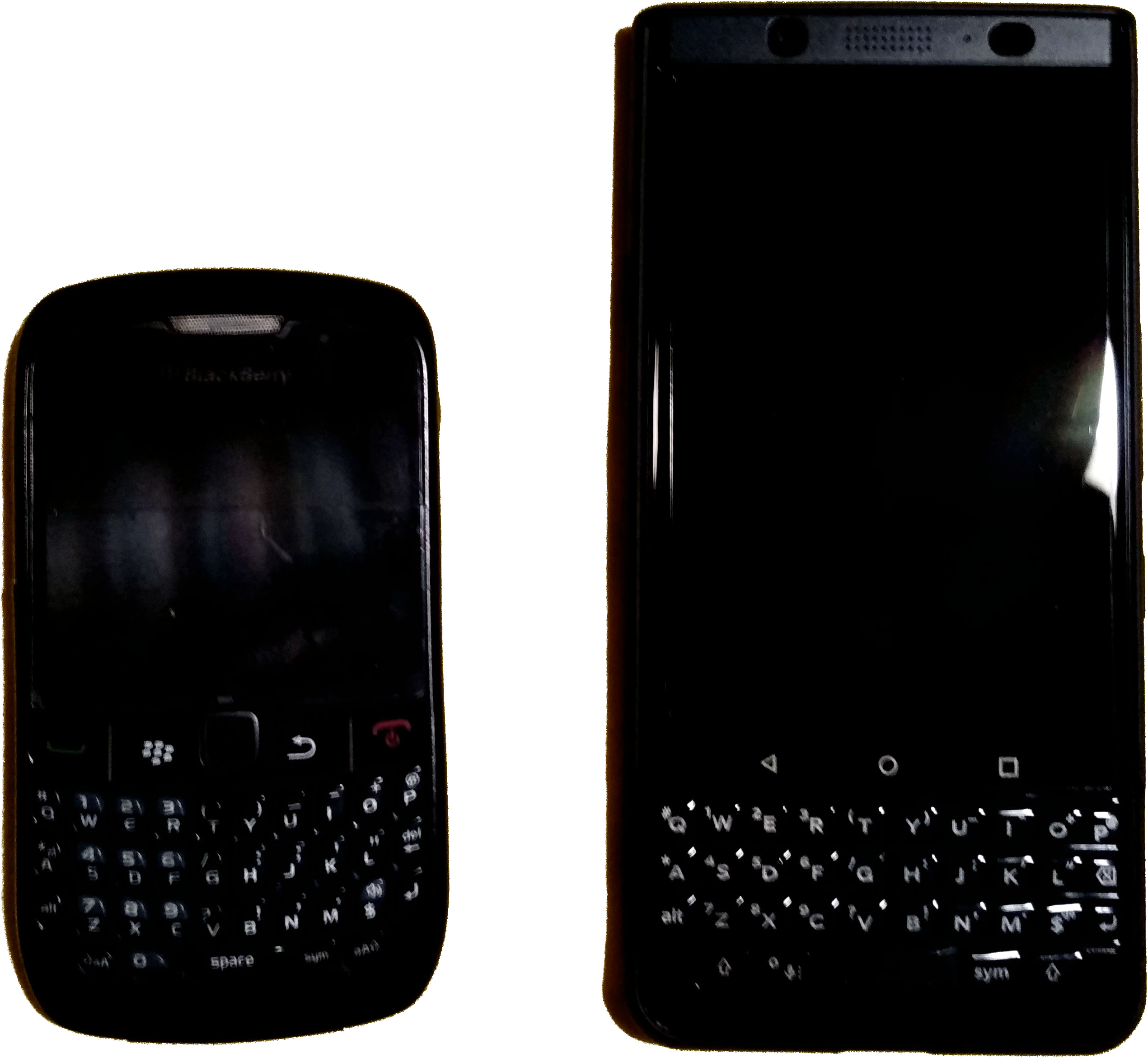
The BlackBerry Curve 8520 (left, introduced 2009) compared with the BlackBerry KeyOne BBB100-7 (right, introduced 2017)

=== Race ===
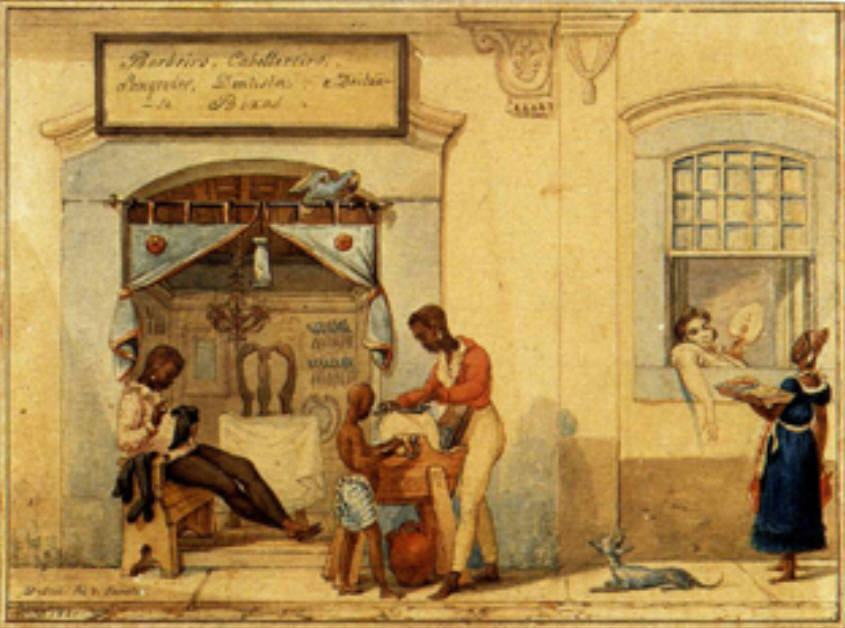
Jean Baptiste Debret - Loja de barbeiros, 1821

The term "Black" is often used in the West to describe people whose skin is darker. In the United States, it is particularly used to describe African Americans. Black is also commonly used as a racial description in the United Kingdom, since ethnicity was first measured in the 2001 census. In Canada, census respondents can identify themselves as Black. In Brazil, the Brazilian Institute of Geography and Statistics (IBGE) asks people to identify themselves as branco (white), pardo (brown), preto (black), or amarelo (yellow).

=== Opposite of white ===
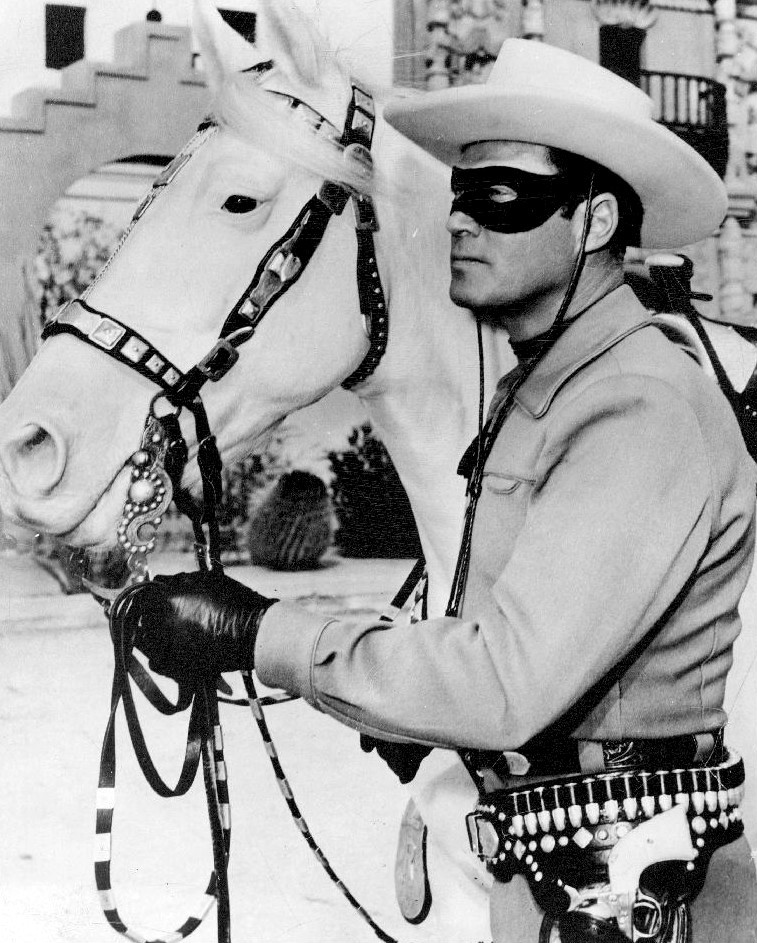
Heroes in American westerns, like the Lone Ranger, traditionally wore a white hat, while the villains wore black hats.

Black and white have often been used to describe opposites, particularly light and darkness and good and evil. In Medieval literature, the white knight usually represented virtue, the black knight something mysterious and sinister. In American westerns, the hero often wore a white hat, the villain a black hat. In philosophy and arguments, the issue is often described as black-and-white, meaning that the issue at hand is dichotomized (having two clear, opposing sides with no middle ground). Black is commonly associated with secrecy.

- In the original game of chess invented in Persia or India, the colors of the two sides were varied; a 12th-century Iranian chess set in the New York Metropolitan Museum of Art, has red and green pieces. But when the game was imported into Europe, the colors, corresponding to European culture, usually became black and white.

=== Elegant fashion ===
Black is the color most commonly associated with elegance in Europe and the United States. Black first became a fashionable color for men in Europe in the 17th century, in the courts of Italy and Spain. In the 19th century, it was the fashion for men both in business and for evening wear. For women's fashion, the defining moment was the invention of the simple black dress by Coco Chanel in 1926. Thereafter, a long black gown was used for formal occasions, while the simple black dress could be used for everything else. The expression "X is the new black" is a reference to the latest trend or fad that is considered a wardrobe basic for the duration of the trend, on the basis that black is always fashionable. The phrase has taken on a life of its own and has become a cliché.

== See also ==
- Black Rose (disambiguation)
- Lists of colors
- Rich black, which is different from using black ink alone, in printing.
- Shades of black
