= Black Saturday =

Black Saturday may refer to:

== Events ==
=== Battles, massacres, and unrest ===
- Battle of Pinkie Cleugh or Black Saturday, a 1547 battle fought between the Scottish and the English Royal armies
- Black Saturday (Mau Movement), a 1929 killing of 11 unarmed people by New Zealand police during a Mau demonstration in Samoa
- Black Saturday, a day during the 1942 Battle of Gazala between the German Afrika Korps and British armoured divisions
- Operation Agatha or Black Saturday (1946), British arrests of Jewish paramilitaries in Palestine
- Cairo Fire or Black Saturday, a 1952 series of riots in Cairo
- Black Saturday (Cuban Missile Crisis), a day in 1962 when tensions reached their height
- Black Saturday or the Wekiduba massacre, the massacre of an Eritrean village by Ethiopian soldiers during the Eritrean War of Independence
- Massacre of the Sixty or Black Saturday, a 1974 execution of 60 senior Ethiopian officials by the country's ruling junta
- Black Saturday (Lebanon), a 1975 series of massacres and armed clashes in Beirut
- Black January or Black Saturday, a 1990 crackdown on Azeri demonstrations by the Soviet army
- 12 May Karachi riots or Black Saturday riots, 2007 political riots in Karachi, Pakistan
- October 7 attacks or Black Saturday, a 2023 military incursion including coordinated massacres in Israel

=== Natural events ===
- Black Saturday (1598), a total solar eclipse over Scotland
- Black Saturday (1621), a dark, stormy day in Scotland, taken as a sign of Armageddon
- Black Saturday (1988), the worst day of the fires in Yellowstone Park
- Black Saturday bushfires, a 2009 series of bushfires that burned across the Australian state of Victoria

=== Economic events ===
- Black Saturday (1900), the collapse of Dumbbell's Bank, Isle of Man, leading to numerous bankruptcies and poverty
- Black Saturday (1983), the crisis when the Hong Kong dollar exchange rate was at an all-time low

=== Other events ===
- Holy Saturday, the day between Good Friday and Easter Sunday
- Black Saturday (France), the busiest day of the year when many people go on holiday
  - Beaune coach crash, occurred on Black Saturday in July 1982
- Black Saturday (1903), the collapse of a balcony section during a baseball game between the Boston Braves and Philadelphia Phillies, which killed 12 spectators and injured more than 200
- Black Saturday (professional wrestling), a 1984 event when the World Wrestling Federation took over the TBS television time slots that had been home to Georgia Championship Wrestling
- Black Saturday demonstrations, an annual parade by the Royal Black Institution, a Protestant organisation in Northern Ireland

== Music ==
- "Black Saturday", a 2012 song by Soundgarden from King Animal
- "Black Saturday", a 2014 song by Mando Diao from Ælita

== Books ==
- Black Saturday: An Unfiltered Account of the October 7th Attack on Israel and the War in Gaza, by American journalist Trey Yingst

== See also ==
- Bloody Saturday (disambiguation)
- Black Sabbath (disambiguation)
- Black Sunday (disambiguation)
- Bloody Sunday (disambiguation)
- Black Friday (disambiguation)
- Bloody Friday (disambiguation)
- Black Monday (disambiguation)
- Bloody Monday (disambiguation)
- Black Tuesday (disambiguation)
- Bloody Tuesday (disambiguation)
- Black Wednesday (disambiguation)
- Bloody Wednesday (disambiguation)
- Black Thursday
- Bloody Thursday (disambiguation)
