= Black Day =

Black Day may refer to

- Black Day (South Korea), an informal holiday in South Korea
- Black Day of the Indiana General Assembly, an 1887 event in Indiana, United States

== See also ==
- Black Sunday (disambiguation)
- Black Monday
- Black Tuesday (disambiguation)
- Black Wednesday (disambiguation)
- Black Thursday
- Black Friday (disambiguation)
- Black Saturday (disambiguation)
- Black Sabbath (disambiguation)
