= Black Friday =

Black Friday may refer to:

== Events ==
=== Recurring days ===
- Black Friday (shopping), the day following Thanksgiving in the United States

- Black Friday etymology hoax, online hoax about the origin of the name

- Black Friday (partying), the last Friday before Christmas in the United Kingdom
- Good Friday or Black Friday, day of Christian observance in commemoration of Jesus' crucifixion

=== Single days ===
- Black Friday (1869), the Fisk–Gould Scandal, an American financial crisis and the origin of the term "Black Friday"
- Black Friday (1873), the crash of the Vienna Stock Exchange that precipitated the Panic of 1873
- Black Friday (1881), the Eyemouth, Scotland disaster in which 189 fishermen died
- Black Friday (1910), day of police brutality on women's suffrage activists in England
- Black Friday (1912), day of police brutality during a general strike in Brisbane
- Black Friday (1916), the day a "perfect storm" hit Lake Erie in North America, sinking four ships
- Black Friday (1919), the Battle of George Square, a riot stemming from industrial unrest in Glasgow, Scotland
- Black Friday (1921), the announcement of British transport union leaders not to call for strike action against wage reductions for miners
- Black Friday (1929), the crash of Wall Street (known as Black Thursday in America and Black Friday in Europe).
- Black Friday (1939), day of devastating bush fires in Victoria, Australia
- Black Friday (1944), disastrous attack by the Black Watch (Royal Highland Regiment) of Canada near Woensdrecht during the Battle of the Scheldt
- Black Friday (1945), Allied military operation during the Norwegian campaigns in World War II
- 1950 Red River flood or Black Friday flood in Winnipeg, Manitoba, Canada
- Black Friday (1959), the cancellation of the CF-105 Arrow and Orenda Iroquois engine programs in Malton, Ontario, Canada
- Black Friday (1960), San Francisco protest against the House Un-American Activities Committee
- Black Friday (1978), massacre of protesters in Iran
- Viernes Negro (1983), the first major currency devaluation in Venezuela
- Black Friday (1982), the day Argentine forces invaded the Falkland Islands
- Black Friday (1987), the day a tornado struck Edmonton, Alberta, Canada
- 1988 killings in Hyderabad, Sindh or Black Friday, a massacre of Mohajir civilians in Hyderabad, Sindh, Pakistan
- Black Friday (1993):
  - Black Friday (March 1993), series of bomb explosions in Mumbai, India
  - Black Friday (November 1993), the production shutdown of Toy Story in 1993, better known as the Black Friday Incident
- Black Friday (1995), the murder of Mexican-American singer Selena
- Black Friday (2004), crackdown by government forces on peaceful protesters in Malé, Maldives
- Black Friday (2005), event in which tribal students were killed in Meghalaya, India
- Black Friday (2011), when the indictment of three online poker companies was unsealed in United States v. Scheinberg
- Black Friday (2014), a four day Israeli bombing campaign on Rafah in the Gaza Strip, notable for its intensity and high number of casualties
- Black Friday (2015):
  - Black Friday (June 2015), string of terrorist attacks in France, Kuwait, Somalia, Syria and Tunisia
  - Black Friday (November 2015), series of terrorist attacks in France

== Films ==
- Black Friday (1916 film), American feature film starring Dorothy Davenport and Emory Johnson
- Black Friday (1940 film), American film starring Boris Karloff and Bela Lugosi
- Black Friday, 2002 action film starring Gary Daniels
- Black Friday (2004 film), Indian film about the 1993 Bombay bombings
- Black Friday, 2007 cable television movie directed by Arthur Allan Seidelman
- Black Friday, 2009 Canadian short film starring Jeff Hammond
- Black Friday (2021 film), American horror comedy film directed by Casey Tebo

== Literature ==
- Black Friday (Patterson novel), a 1986 novel by James Patterson
- Black Friday (Muchamore novel), a 2013 CHERUB novel by Robert Muchamore

== Music ==
=== Albums ===
- Black Friday (Indian Ocean album) (2005)
- Black Friday (Faderhead album) (2010)
- Black Friday (Tom Odell album) (2024)
- Black Friday, a Palehound album (2019)

=== Mixtapes ===
- Black Friday (Tony Yayo mixtape) (2008)
- Black Friday (Jay Rock mixtape) (2010)
- Black Friday (Lil' Kim mixtape) (2011)

=== Songs and singles ===
- "Black Friday", Steely Dan song and lead single from their 1975 album Katy Lied
- "Good Mourning/Black Friday", song by Megadeth from their 1986 album, Peace Sells... but Who's Buying?
- "Black Friday", 1998 song by Grinspoon from Pushing Buttons
- "Black Friday", 2013 song by Stray from the Path from Anonymous
- "Black Friday" (Gwar single album), 2016 single by thrash metal band Gwar
- "Black Friday" (Tom Odell song), 2023 single by Tom Odell

== Television ==
- "Black Friday" (South Park), 2013 episode of South Park
- "Black Friday" (Scream Queens), 2015 episode of Scream Queens

== Other uses ==
- Black Friday (musical), 2019 musical produced by StarKid Productions
- 1979 Revolution: Black Friday, 2016 video game by iNK Stories
- Game 3 of the 1977 National League Championship Series, a controversial baseball game nicknamed "Black Friday"

== See also ==
- Bloody Friday (disambiguation)
- Friday the 13th (disambiguation)
- Black Day (disambiguation)
- Black Monday
- Black Tuesday
- Black Wednesday
- Black Thursday
- Black Saturday
- Black Sunday
- List of Black Fridays
