= Black Monday (disambiguation) =

Black Monday refers to specific Mondays when undesirable or turbulent events have occurred.

Black Monday may also refer to:

== Events ==
- Black Monday (1360), a freak hail storm killing 1,000 English soldiers
- Black Monday (1894), the Newfoundland bank crash
- Black Monday (1929), the Wall Street crash
- Black Monday (Malta), 15 October 1979, ransacking of the Progress Press following a Labour Party rally
- Black Monday (1987), a global stock market crash
- Black Monday (2008), in the 2008 financial crisis
- Black Monday (2011), a US and global stock market crash
- Black Monday (China), a 2015–2016 Chinese stock market turbulence
- Black Monday (2020), a stock market crash

== Other uses ==
- Black Monday (TV series), a 2019 American historical dark comedy
- Black Monday (album), a 2000 album by Dice
- Black Monday (card game), a 1988 game by Sid Sackson
- Black Monday (film), a 1922 German silent film
- Black Monday, professional name of American record producer and composer Jeff Kleinman

== See also ==
- Black Thursday
- Black Friday (disambiguation)
