= Bloody Monday (disambiguation) =

Bloody Monday can mean:

- Bloody Monday, the 1855 riots in Louisville, Kentucky
- Bloody Monday (Louisiana), a 1929 incident during the impeachment of Governor Huey Long
- Hilo Massacre, the 1938 police shootings of strikers in Hilo, Hawaii
- Częstochowa massacre, the massacre of Polish and Jewish civilians by the Wehrmacht in 1939
- Katowice massacre, the massacre of Polish defenders of Katowice by the Wehrmacht in 1939
- Bloody Monday (Danville), a civil protest at Danville, Virginia, 10 June 1963
- Claudy bombing, on 31 July 1972, when three car bombs exploded mid-morning on the Main Street of Claudy in County Londonderry, Northern Ireland
- Abdi House raid, a 1993 attack by UN and US forces on a gathering of Somali elders

== Other uses ==
- Bloody Monday (manga), a manga series

== See also ==
- Black Monday
- Bloody Sunday (disambiguation)
