= Bloody Sunday =

Bloody Sunday may refer to:

== Historical events ==
=== Canada ===
- Bloody Sunday (1923), a day of police violence during a steelworkers' strike for union recognition in Sydney, Cape Breton Island, Nova Scotia
- Bloody Sunday (1938), police violence against unemployment protesters in Vancouver, British Columbia, Canada

=== Ireland ===
- Bloody Sunday (1913), an attack by police against protesting trade unionists in Dublin, Ireland during the Dublin lock-out
- Bloody Sunday (1920), a day of violence in Dublin during the Irish War of Independence, in which Irish Republican Army hit squads killed or injured 15 mostly British army officers, after which Auxiliary forces opened fire on the crowd of a Gaelic Football match, killing 14 people and injuring at least 80 others
- Bloody Sunday (1921), a day of violence in Belfast during the Irish War of Independence, in which police launched a raid against Irish republicans, which was ambushed by the Irish Republican Army
- Bloody Sunday (1972), British soldiers shot 26 unarmed civilians during a protest march, killing 14 of the protesters in Derry, Northern Ireland

=== England ===
- Bloody Sunday (1887), a day of violent clashes between protestors and police in London, England
- Bloody Sunday, a police charge on a crowd of protestors during the 1911 Liverpool general transport strike

=== Poland ===
- Bloody Sunday (1939) or Bromberg Bloody Sunday, events in Bydgoszcz, Poland, at the onset of World War II
- Stanislawow Ghetto massacre (German: Blutsonntag von Stanislau, Ukrainian: Кривава неділя у Станіславі), a 1941 massacre of Jews before the Stanisławów Ghetto announcement
- Volhynian Bloody Sunday, a 1943 massacre of ethnic Poles by Ukrainian National Army paramilitaries, specifically Ukrainian Insurgent Army (UPA)

=== United States ===
- Everett massacre, a violent confrontation between police and striking workers in Everett, Washington, United States in November 1916
- Bloody Sunday (1965), the violent suppression of a civil rights march by state and local law enforcement in Selma, Alabama

=== Other ===
- Bloody Sunday (1900), a day of high British military casualties during the Second Boer War
- Bloody Sunday (1905), the killing of unarmed demonstrators by Russian soldiers in Saint Petersburg, Russia
- Marburg's Bloody Sunday, a 1919 massacre of ethnically German civilians by soldiers during a protest in Maribor, Slovenia
- Bloody Sunday (Bolzano), a 1921 day of unrest instigated by fascists in Bolzano, Italy
- Bloody Sunday (1926), a day of violence in Alsace between French nationalists and Alsatian autonomists
- Altona Bloody Sunday, a 1932 confrontation among the Sturmabteilung and Schutzstaffel, the police, and Communist Party supporters in Altona, Hamburg
- Bloody Sunday (1968), a massacre in Prostějov during Warsaw Pact invasion of Czechoslovakia
- Bloody Sunday (1969), violence after a protest in Taksim Square, Istanbul, Turkey
- January Events (Lithuania), the 1991 killing of 14 civilians by the Soviet Army following the Act of the Re-Establishment of the State of Lithuania
- 2021 Calabarzon raids, the killing of nine activists and arrest of six individuals in Calabarzon, Philippines, by the Philippine National Police and the Armed Forces of the Philippines

== Other uses ==
- Bloody Sunday (film), a 2002 film about the 1972 event
- Bloody Sunday (radio show), a 2006 Australian radio programme
- Bloody Sunday: Scenes from the Saville Inquiry, a 2005 play by Richard Norton-Taylor

== See also ==
- Black Sunday (disambiguation)
- Bloody Sunday Inquiry, a 1998 inquiry commissioned by Tony Blair to investigate the killings of 1972
- Sunday Bloody Sunday (disambiguation)
- Bloody Saturday (disambiguation)
