= Friday the 13th (disambiguation) =

Friday the 13th is an unlucky day in western superstition.

Friday the 13th or Friday the Thirteenth may also refer to:

== Horror franchise ==
- Friday the 13th (franchise), an American horror franchise
  - Friday the 13th (1980 film), the first film in the series
  - Friday the 13th (2009 film), a remake of the series
- Friday the 13th: The Computer Game, a 1986 game by Domark
- Friday the 13th: The Series, a 1987–1990 television series
- Friday the 13th (1989 video game), developed by Atlus
- Friday the 13th: The Game, a 2017 game developed by IllFonic

== Film ==
- Friday the 13th (1916 film), an American silent film
- Friday the 13th, a 1923 American silent film directed by and starring Marcel Perez
- Friday the Thirteenth (1933 film), a British comedy-drama
- Friday the Thirteenth (1949 film), a German comedy crime film
- Friday the 13th, a 1953 Little Roquefort cartoon
- Brookside: Friday the 13th, a 1998 British film spin-off of the television soap opera Brookside

== Television ==
- "Friday the 13th", Arthur season 6, episode 10b (2001)
- "Friday the 13th", Beast King GoLion episode 23 (1981)
- "Friday the 13th", Candy episode 1 (2022)
- "Friday the 13th", Code Lyoko: Evolution episode 13 (2013)
- "Friday the 13th", Felix the Cat season 1, episode 14 (1958)
- "Friday the 13th", Great Lake Warriors episode 7 (2012)
- "Friday the 13th", Hey Arnold! season 4, episode 14b (1999)
- "Friday the 13th", Kelly season 1, episode 5 (1991)
- "Friday the 13th", NBC Matinee Theater season 1, episode 53 (1956)
- "Friday the 13th", Ovide and the Gang episode 58 (1988)
- "Friday the 13th", Second Thoughts series 5, episode 8 (1994)
- "Friday the 13th", Shark Wranglers episode 7 (2012)
- "Friday the 13th", Ssshhhh...Koi Hai season 2, episode 24 (2007)
- "Friday the 13th", Swamp People season 11, episode 6 (2020)
- "Friday the 13th", The Killer Bride episode 90 (2019)
- "Friday the 13th", Up the Elephant and Round the Castle series 2, episode 3 (1985)
- "Friday the 13th, 1901", Murdoch Mysteries season 7, episode 14 (2014)
- "Friday the Thirteenth", Epic Ink episode 5 (2014)
- "Friday the Thirteenth", Fox's Peter Pan & the Pirates episode 40 (1991)
- "Friday the Thirteenth", Teen Mom season 6 part 2, episode 25 (2017)
- "Friday the Thirteenth", The Army Game series 2, episode 26 (1959)
- "Friday the Thirteenth", The Gale Storm Show season 2, episode 16 (1957)
- "They'll Get You in the End (Friday the 13th)", Sirens (1993) season 1, episode 13 (1993)

== Music ==
=== Albums ===
- Friday the Thirteenth (album), by the Stranglers
- Friday 13th (EP), by the Damned
- Live Ritual – Friday the 13th, a 2002 album by Blasphemy
- Live – Friday the 13th, a 2005 DVD and CD by Maroon 5
- Friday 13th, a 1984 album by Man
- Friday the 13th, a 2016 EP by Misfits

=== Songs ===
- "Friday the 13th", a composition by Thelonious Monk included on the 1954 album Thelonious Monk and Sonny Rollins
- "Friday the 13th", a song by Jolin Tsai from the 2012 album Muse
- "Friday the 13th", a song by Nana Kitade from the 2006 album I Scream
- "Paraskavedekatriaphobia (Friday the 13)", a song by Fozzy from the 2010 album Chasing the Grail
- "Friday 13th" (song), a 2020 song by Gorillaz

== Other uses ==
- Friday the Thirteenth, a 1907 novel by Thomas W. Lawson
- Friday the 13th, the American alternative title of Exit John Horton, a 1939 British novel by Joseph Jefferson Farjeon
- Friday the Thirteenth, the working title of the 1940 science fiction horror film Black Friday
- "Friday the Thirteenth", a 1976 short story by Isaac Asimov
- Friday the 13th, a 1981 picture book by Steven Kroll
- "Friday the 13th", episode 12 of the first season of the web series Angry Video Game Nerd (2006)

== See also ==
- Black Friday (disambiguation)
- Friday the 13th mini-crash, the 13 October 1989 stock market crash
- Paraskevidekatriaphobia, the fear of Friday the 13th
- Triskaidekaphobia, the fear of the number 13
- Frightday the 13th, a 1953 Casper the Friendly Ghost cartoon
