= List of Black Fridays =

Black Friday is a term used to refer to certain events which occur on a Friday. It has been used in the following cases:

== Specific events ==
- Black Friday (1688), imprisonment of the Seven Bishops of the Church of England (8 June), on the eve of the Glorious Revolution.
- Panic of 1866, sometimes referred to as Black Friday, an international financial downturn that accompanied the failure of Overend, Gurney and Company in London (11 May)
- Black Friday (1869), the Fisk-Gould Scandal (24 September), a financial crisis in the United States.
- Black Friday (1881), the Eyemouth disaster (14 October), in which 189 fishermen died.
- Haymarket affair (11 November 1887), four Chicago anarchists hanged, without evidence, for the deaths of seven police officers during a labor meeting.
- Black Friday (1910), a campaign outside the British House of Commons (18 November) of the Women's Social and Political Union after the Conciliation Bill failed.
- Black Friday (1919), the Battle of George Square (31 January), a riot stemming from industrial unrest in Glasgow, Scotland.
- Black Friday (1921), the announcement of British transport union leaders (15 April) not to call for strike action against wage reductions for miners.
- Black Friday (1929), the crash of Wall Street (known as Black Thursday in America and Black Friday in Europe).
- Black Friday (1939), a day of devastating bushfires (13 January) in Victoria, Australia, which killed 71 people.
- In the 1941 Białystok massacres, The "Black Friday" of June 27, 1941
- Black Friday (1942), an air raid on Dartmouth, Devon (18 September).
- Black Friday (1944), a disastrous attack by The Black Watch (Royal Highland Regiment) of Canada (13 October) near Woensdrecht during the Battle of the Scheldt.
- Black Friday (1945), an air battle over Sunnfjord (9 February), the largest over Norway.
- Hollywood Black Friday (5 October 1945), a riot at the Warner Bros. studios stemming from a Confederation of Studio Unions (CSU) strike leading to the eventual breakup of the CSU.
- 1950 Red River Flood, which burst several dikes flooding much of Winnipeg, Manitoba (5 May).
- The cancellation of the Avro Arrow (20 February 1959), which resulted in massive layoffs in the Canadian Aerospace industry.
- Black Friday (1960), San Francisco City protest against the House Un-American Activities Committee.
- Black Friday (1963), the assassination of US President John F Kennedy in Dallas, Texas on 22 November 1963.
- Black Friday (1974), an armed standoff in Calgary, Alberta during which 8 Calgary Police Service Officers were shot, one fatally, leading to the formation of Calgary's first Tactical Unit.
- Black Friday (1978), a massacre of protesters in Iran (8 September).
- Viernes Negro, beginning of modern economic turmoil in Venezuela (18 February 1983)
- 1985 United States-Canadian tornado outbreak, (31 May 1985).
- Edmonton tornado (31 July 1987), a tornado touching down in Edmonton, Alberta, Canada.
- Friday the 13th mini-crash (13 October 1989), a stock market crash referred to by some as the "Black Friday" crash
- Black Friday, an event on 1992 where the screenplay for Aladdin was entirely rewritten by Jeffrey Katzenberg's order.
- Black Friday (1993), which refers to two distinct events:
  - Black Friday (March 1993) (12 March), a series of bomb explosions in Mumbai, India that killed 257 people
  - Black Friday (November 1993) (19 November), the production shutdown of the Pixar film Toy Story (1995) due to negative reception to the reel by the Disney executives.
- Murder of Selena (31 March 1995), nicknamed by Hispanics as "Black Friday" when American singer Selena was murdered.
- Uphaar Cinema fire (13 June 1997), in New Delhi, India.
- Black Friday (Maldives) (13 August 2004), a crackdown in Malé, Maldives on peaceful protesters.
- Black Friday (2005), student protesters killed in Meghalaya, India (30 September).
- 2009 Jakarta bombings, terrorist attacks at hotels (17 July), referred to as Black Friday by The Jakarta Post.
- Black Friday (2011), several online poker sites seized (15 April) as a result of United States v. Scheinberg et al..
- 2013 El Reno tornado, a record setting 2.6 mile wide EF3 tornado (May 31) that is the widest tornado on record, the second fastest wind speed on record that struck near El Reno, Oklahoma and the first fatal accident in the storm chasing community that killed 8 people including 3 storm chasers, Tim & Paul Samaras and Carl Young of TWISTEX due to numerous shifts in the path of the tornado.
- Black Friday (2014), a four day Israeli bombing campaign on Rafah in the Gaza Strip, notable for its intensity and high number of casualties
- Black Friday (2015):
  - 26 June 2015 Islamist attacks, terrorist attacks in France, Kuwait, Syria and Tunisia (26 June), also called Bloody Friday in English.
  - November 2015 Paris attacks (13 November 2015), referred to as Black Friday (vendredi noir) by several media outlets
- Tornado outbreak of December 10–11, 2021, the deadliest tornado outbreak in the month of December in the United States with 89 fatalities and 672 injuries, which also that produced the Quad-State Tornadic Supercell.
- Many 2025 anti-corruption protests in the Philippines were termed as Black Friday Protests. At least six Black Friday Protests were orchestrated by affiliates of Bagong Alyansang Makabayan on November 7 alone.

== Recurring events ==
- Black Friday (partying), the last Friday before Christmas
- Black Friday (shopping), the Friday after U.S. Thanksgiving Day, when shopping is extremely popular and traditionally the start of Christmas shopping.
- Good Friday or Black Friday, a Christian observance of Jesus' crucifixion
