= Blue Day (disambiguation) =

Blue Day is a compilation album by English band Slowdive.

Blue Day may also refer to:

- "Blue Day" (Mi-Sex song), 1984
- "Blue Day" (Suggs song), 1997
- "Blue Day", a 2001 song by American Hi-Fi from American Hi-Fi

== See also ==
- "Blue Blue Day"
- "Blue Morning, Blue Day"
- Born on a Blue Day, a memoir by autistic savant Daniel Tammet
- Blue Monday (disambiguation)
