= Black Sunday =

Black Sunday may refer to:

== Events ==
=== Natural disasters ===
- Black Sunday, a day of major bushfires in Victoria, Australia during the 1925–26 Victorian bushfire season
- Black Sunday (storm), a 1935 dust storm that swept across the Midwestern United States during the Dust Bowl
- Black Sunday, a 1938 event of extraordinary surf conditions at Bondi Beach, Sydney, Australia
- Black Sunday (1955), a series of bushfires in South Australia
- Black Sunday (1963), the deadliest lightning strike on record involving Pan Am Flight 214, or The Clipper Tradewind, a Boeing 707-121 that crashed in Maryland on 8 December 1963.
- Black Sunday, the day of the deadly 1967 Iowa–Minnesota tornado outbreak
- Black Sunday, the evening the deadliest single tornado to ever hit the US State of Missouri, the 2011 Joplin Tornado

=== Warfare and terrorism ===
- Black Sunday, the 1918 attack of SM U-151 against U.S. ships off the coast of New Jersey
- Black Sunday (1937), an Irgun attack on November 14 in Jerusalem
- Black Sunday, when 53 USAAF aircraft and 660 aircrewmen were lost during the 1943 Operation Tidal Wave attack on Romanian oil refineries
- Bus massacre, also known as Black Sunday, the 1975 clashes in Beirut that started the Lebanese Civil War
- Black Sunday, the first day of the Siege of Sadr City (2004–2007) during the Iraq War

=== Other events ===
- Black Sunday, the 1955 opening day of Disneyland Park
- Black Sunday, the 1982 cancellation of the Colony Shale Oil Project
- Black Sunday, the 1984 victory by the Los Angeles Raiders in Super Bowl XVIII
- Black Sunday (1991), a day in which three people died in two unrelated incidents at Kings Island amusement park
- Black Sunday, the 1998 failure of the Automated Guideway Transit System at Denver International Airport
- Black Sunday, the 2001 death of Dale Earnhardt
- Black Sunday (2005), a day when three New York City firefighters were killed in two fires

== Music ==
- Black Sunday (Cypress Hill album) (1993)
- Black Sunday (Sutter Kain & Donnie Darko album) (2005)
- "Black Sunday", a song by Black Label Society from Order of the Black
- "Black Sunday", a song by Coheed and Cambria from album Vaxis – Act I: The Unheavenly Creatures
- "Black Sunday", a song by Cold from Year of the Spider
- "Black Sunday", a song by Espen Lind from This Is Pop Music
- "Black Sunday", a song by Jag Panzer from album Ample Destruction
- "Black Sunday", a song by Jethro Tull from A

== Other uses ==
- Black Sunday (1960 film), an Italian horror film
- Black Sunday (novel), a 1975 novel by Thomas Harris
  - Black Sunday (1977 film), an American film adaptation of the novel

== See also ==
- Black mass
- Black Monday
- Black Tuesday
- Black Wednesday
- Black Thursday
- Black Friday
- Black Saturday
- Black Sabbath (disambiguation)
- Bloody Sunday (disambiguation)
