= Goodbye Blue Monday =

Goodbye blue Monday may refer to:

- Breakfast of Champions, or Goodbye Blue Monday, 1973 novel by the American author Kurt Vonnegut
- Goodbye Blue Monday (album), 2007 album from Canadian singer-songwriter Jeremy Fisher
- Goodbye Blue Monday, misery punk band from Scotland

== See also ==
- Blue Monday (disambiguation)
