= Black Monday =

Black Monday refers to specific Mondays when undesirable or turbulent events have occurred. It has been used to designate massacres, military battles, and stock market crashes.

== Historic events ==
- 1209, Dublin – when a group of 500 recently arrived settlers from Bristol were killed by warriors of the Gaelic O'Byrne clan. The group had left the safety of the walled city of Dublin to celebrate Easter Monday near a wood at Ranelagh, when they were attacked without warning. Although now a relatively obscure event in history, it was commemorated by a mustering of the Mayor, Sheriffs and soldiers on the day as a challenge to the native tribes for centuries afterwards.
- 13 April 1360 – Black Monday (1360), when inclement weather killed men and horses in the army of Edward III during the Hundred Years' War.
- Solar eclipse of April 8, 1652 (New Style, i.e. in the Gregorian calendar, or 29 March, Old Style, in the Julian calendar used in Great Britain at that time) – A total solar eclipse.
- 24 February 1689 – During the Williamite War in Ireland the Protestant inhabitants of Bandon rose up against the Irish Army garrison of the town in an incident known as Black Monday. Bandon was quickly recaptured by Justin MacCarthy.
- 10 December 1894, also known as the Newfoundland Bank Crash of 1894, the Union Bank of Newfoundland and the Commercial Bank of Newfoundland closed.
- 27 May 1935 – The US Supreme Court ruled unanimously against President Franklin D. Roosevelt in three cases challenging the constitutionality of the New Deal, which was a factor leading to Roosevelt's attempt in 1937 to pack the Supreme Court.
- 17 May 1954, Washington, D.C. – Following the Supreme Court's decision in Brown v. Board of Education, U.S. Representative John Bell Williams (D-Mississippi) coined the term "Black Monday" on the floor of Congress to denote Monday, 17 May 1954, the date of the Supreme Court's decision. In opposition to the decision, white citizens' councils formally organized throughout the south to preserve segregation and defend segregated schools.
- 19 September 1977, Youngstown, Ohio, U.S. – Youngstown Sheet and Tube closes its doors and furloughs 5000 workers, devastating the Youngstown economy: See Economy of Youngstown, Ohio § Black Monday
- 8 October 1990 – 1990 Temple Mount riots in Jerusalem.
- August 2003 – During the Europe heat wave of 2003, 3000 died in a single night in Paris due to the excessive heat.
- 20 July 2009, Berlin – Only 330 of the 1,260 of the Berlin S-Bahn's train cars were deemed good for operation, resulting in significant service reductions. Earlier in the month 380 (30.2%) train cars were removed, making the total removed on 20 July was at 550 (43.7%).
- 3 October 2016 – Strikes and demonstrations by women in Poland protesting against proposed legislation for a total ban on abortion.
- 9 May 2022 – During the 2022 Sri Lankan protests, armed loyalists of Mahinda Rajapaksa led by Sri Lanka Podujana Peramuna politicians attacked protestors that were occupying Temple Trees and Galle Face.

=== Stock market losses ===
- 28 October 1929 – Stock markets in the United States began to crash as part of the Wall Street crash of 1929.
- 19 October 1987 – Stock markets around the world unexpectedly crashed, shedding a huge value in a very short time.
- 29 September 2008 – Following the bursting of the post-Cold War real-estate bubble and the 2008 financial crisis, stock markets worldwide crashed, leading to the Great Recession.
- 8 August 2011 – A stock market crash occurred from a credit rate downgrade of the United States' debt.
- 24 August 2015 – The 2015–2016 Chinese stock market turbulence began. The SSE Composite Index declined by 8.45%.
- 16 September 2019 – The Federal Reserve began intervening in the repo market five months before the start of the 2020 stock market crash after the overnight lending rate spiked above 8%.
- 9 March 2020 – Part of the 2020 stock market crash; the worst day for stock market losses since the Great Recession, fueled by investor panic over the COVID-19 pandemic and the oil price war between Russia and Saudi Arabia.
- 16 March 2020 – Larger declines than the previous week's fall during the 2020 stock market crash.
- 7 April 2025 - Part of the 2025 stock market crash; the largest declines since the aforementioned March 2020 Black Mondays, which set off many circuit breakers in Asian markets, as a result of tariffs in the second Trump administration.

== Recurring events ==
- The day following the final Sunday of the National Football League regular season (Week 18) on which numerous coaches and general managers of underperforming teams are fired, their contracts are allowed to expire without renewal, or they resign their positions. The first known use of the phrase was attributed by a pair of writers in The New York Times to a 1998 Associated Press story, "Black Monday for NFL Coaches". The term is also sometimes used in reference to the day following the annual NFL draft where players' contracts may be terminated once new players are added to a roster.
- An old schoolchildren's name for the first Monday of the new year, when winter recess ends and school resumes.

== See also ==
- Black Tuesday
- Black Wednesday
- Black Thursday
- Black Friday
- Black Saturday
- Black Sunday
- Blue Monday
- Bloody Monday (disambiguation)
