= Blue Monday =

Blue Monday may refer to:

== Music ==
- "Blue Monday" (New Order song), a 1983 song by New Order
- "Blue Monday" (1954 song), a 1950s song first recorded by Smiley Lewis and later popularized by Fats Domino
- Blue Monday (Flunk album), a 2002 album by Flunk
- Blue Monday (opera), the original name of a George Gershwin one-act "jazz opera"
- Blue Monday (band), a Vancouver hardcore punk band
- "Blue Monday", 1991 instrumental by White Lion on Mane Attraction
- Blue Monday, weekly blues and jazz show created by DJ Larry Monroe

== Other uses ==
- Blue Monday (term), workers hungover from a weekend's drinking
- Blue Monday (comics), a comic book by Chynna Clugston-Major
- Blue Monday (date), supposedly the most depressing day of the year
- Blue Monday (film), a 1938 The Captain and the Kids cartoon
- "Blue Monday" (Eureka Seven episode), the pilot episode of the anime series Eureka Seven
- The last game of the 1981 National League Championship Series between the Montreal Expos and the Los Angeles Dodgers
- Blue Monday, a 1985 painting by artist Annie Lee
- Nieuwmarkt riots, Netherlands: 1975 protests in Amsterdam against the demolition of homes

== See also ==
- Goodbye Blue Monday (disambiguation)
- Black Monday
