= Sunday Bloody Sunday (disambiguation) =

"Sunday Bloody Sunday" is a song by U2 released in February 1983.

Sunday Bloody Sunday may also refer to:

- Sunday Bloody Sunday (film), a 1971 British drama film by John Schlesinger
- "Sunday Bloody Sunday" (Paddywagon song) (March 1972)
- "Sunday Bloody Sunday" (John Lennon and Yoko Ono song) (June 1972)
- "Sunday, Bloody Sunday", an episode of That '70s Show

== See also ==
- Bloody Sunday (disambiguation)
