= Bloody Friday (Minneapolis) =

1934 US police shooting event

Bloody Friday is the name of an event which occurred in Minneapolis, Minnesota on July 20, 1934, when city police shot at truck drivers injuring 67 picketers and killing strikers John Belor and Henry Ness. This was one incident in the Minneapolis general strike of 1934, beginning May 20 and ending on August 22.

In 1940 the Aquatennial celebrations were created in the same third week of July as the first Bloody Friday had landed on, "to take the minds of Minneapolis citizens off past troubles and focus all minds throughout the state on some pleasant event."

== Background ==
During the Great Depression work for drivers of Minneapolis was sporadic. Because of the poor economic conditions of the time people wouldn’t order coal unless serious weather was coming. As a result, coal workers would only find work when the weather was severe for 20-30 cents per hour, often for long shifts that could last until midnight. Under the leadership of Vincent Dunne and Carl Skoglund, the coal workers organized and joined Local 574 of the Teamsters Union. After coal operators failed to recognize Local 574’s bargaining rights, the union and seven hundred members went on strike on February 7, 1934. The strike lasted three days after operators agreed to negotiate wages and working conditions with union officials who represented some, but not all, of their employees. After this success Dunne and Skoglund looked to build on the momentum of the previous strike by focusing on the city’s market district and its major employers, who dealt in mostly perishable produce. They targeted eleven market district firms, demanding closed shops and an average wage of $27.50 per week, with extra pay for overtime work. To combat the union the eleven market district firms formed an informal committee, back by the anti-union Citizens' Alliance, representing 166 local businesses that had truck driver employees in an attempt to broaden the conflict. Local 574 eventually gave up its demand for closed shops but the business committee refused to negotiate. Frustrated with the lack of progress the union called for another strike that would see clashes between the unions and police.

== Bloody Friday ==
On Friday July 20, police cordoned off an area on Third Street North in front of the Slocum Bergren Company as two trucks loaded merchandise at the company’s dock and drove off under police escort. A third truck followed by twelve squad cars carrying shotgun-armed policemen turned onto Third Street North and was cut off by another truck carrying picketers. Police opened fire with shotguns on the pickets' truck. By the end of it 67 strikers had been wounded, two of which, John Belor and Henry Ness, later died.

An investigation ordered by Governor Floyd B. Olson determined "police took direct aim at the pickets and fired to kill. Physical safety of police was at no time endangered. No weapons were in possession of the pickets in the truck. At no time did the pickets attack the police."

== Aftermath ==
On July 24 100,000 people lined the streets of the route of the funeral procession for Henry Ness, according to The Minneapolis Labor Review. Many people called for the firing of Police Chief Michael Johannes whom they dubbed “Bloody Mike.” Governor Floyd B. Olson declared martial law after employers announced they would start moving trucks again. The National Guard began issuing permits to allow companies not directly targeted by the Local 574 to begin transporting goods again. 4,000 permits were issued, angering union leaders who as a result announced they would begin picketing again.

In response Governor Olson first ordered that the union headquarters be raided, and a couple days later ordered a raid on Citizen Alliance headquarters. The Regional Labor Board offered a settlement named the Haas-Dunnigan Plan that established uniform pay rates for trucking workers and called for strikers to be rehired. The proposed settlement was accepted by the Local 574 but the trucking companies rejected it. On August 8, while in Rochester, MN for a ceremony honoring the Mayo brothers, President Franklin D. Roosevelt met with Governor Olson who briefed him on the strike in Minneapolis. A labor delegation also met with Roosevelt’s chief aide, Louis Howe, encouraging the Roosevelt administration to pressure the Minneapolis businessmen to settle the strike.

Not long after Roosevelt’s visit, Jesse Jones, the head of the administration’s Reconstruction Finance Corporation, began making calls to local industrialists in Minnesota who relied on the RFC to meet their credit needs signaling to them that their relationship with the agency could be jeopardized if they continued to resist the Haas-Dunnigan Plan. By August 22 the strike was ended after a new settlement was finally reached which gave the union most of what it wanted.

== Remembrance ==
Successful organizing and union victories following the 1934 strikes birthed many parades and memorial events, the General Drivers picnics at their head with nearly 20,000 in attendance.

While the intent is tenuous, the fact is Aquatennial is a colossal business sponsored event that overshadows the same timeslot many of these labor remembrances had. Where there were once fat lady races and all manner of inclusive participant run events, in 1941 there was the Aqua Dears, a synchronized swimming troupe with strict height and weight limits of 5'4" and 125 lbs. The history of Aquatennial is events named and sponsored by business, in 1971 the milk carton boat race was launched by advertising agency Campbell Mithun, Inc, even the capstone fireworks are Target branded.

In 2015, a plaque was created detailing the labor movement, events of bloody friday, and the subsequent labor unionization resulting from the killings. The plaque is located near the original site, 701 North 3rd St, where yearly memorial gatherings are also held.

== See also ==
- Bloody Friday (disambiguation)
- Minneapolis Teamsters Strike of 1934
