= Bloody Tuesday =

Bloody Tuesday is a term used to refer to certain events which occurred on a Tuesday:

- two die when gunfire erupts during the San Francisco Streetcar Strike of 1907
- one day in the 1913 Ipswich Mills strike
- one day in the African Mine Workers' Union Strike in 1946
- Badu Station Incident and She-liao Tao Incident Both used in Formerly Japanese Name Before Taiwanese's cognition. is Part of February 28 incident in 1947
- the start of the April Revolution, South Korea, 1960
- Bloody Tuesday (1964), civil rights marchers attacked by police in Tuscaloosa, Alabama
- "Bloody Tuesday", an episode in the Polish animated series Włatcy móch

== See also ==
- Black Tuesday (disambiguation)
