= The Killer Bride =

Philippine television drama series

- Title card
- Genre: Gothic fiction; Drama; Horror; Romance; Supernatural; Revenge
- Created by: Arah Jell G. Badayos
- Developed by: ABS-CBN Studios
- Written by: Arden Rod Condez; Arah Jell G. Badayos; Benson A. Logronio; Sonny A. Calvento; Jimuel P. dela Cruz
- Directed by: Diosdado "Dado" C. Lumibao
- Starring: Maja Salvador; Janella Salvador; Joshua Garcia; Geoff Eigenmann; Miko Raval
- Opening theme: "Halik sa Hangin" by KZ Tandingan
- Ending theme: "Bawat Daan" by Zephanie
- Country of origin: Philippines
- Original language: Filipino
- No. of seasons: 2
- No. of episodes: 115 (list of episodes)

Production
- Executive producers: Carlo Katigbak; Cory Vidanes; Laurenti Dyogi
- Producers: Myleen H. Ongkiko; Ann D. Guimbangunan
- Editors: Joy C. Buenaventura; Trin Ebarle; Yiezzel Gatdula; Jeric Hernandez; Alan C. Pimentel; Ayen del Carmen-Guiyang; Raymond Samaniego; Dennis Austria; Mayette Manlutac; Ding Mora; Jessica Rae Viñas
- Running time: 30-45 minutes
- Production company: RCD Narratives

Original release
- Network: ABS-CBN
- Release: August 12, 2019 – January 17, 2020

The Killer Bride is a Philippine television drama Gothic horror series broadcast by ABS-CBN. Directed by Dado Lumibao, it stars Maja Salvador, Janella Salvador, Joshua Garcia and Geoff Eigenmann. It aired on the network's Primetime Bida line up and worldwide on TFC from August 12, 2019 to January 17, 2020, replacing Sino ang Maysala?: Mea Culpa and was replaced by A Soldier's Heart.

== Premise ==
Las Espadas was once a town full of vast greenery and plantations owned by generations of wealthy landowners and their farmers until a 1999 major crop plague doomed their land, sparking a superstitious tale among the locals.

The tale stems from a woman named Camila dela Torre (Maja Salvador), who in 1999—right before her wedding day, "killed" a member of a rival family and was found by her fiance, the victim's brother, in a bloody wedding dress and veil. During her murder trial, Camila begs the court that she is wrongfully accused, but is eventually shunned by her own fiance Vito dela Cuesta (Geoff Eigenmann) who testifies against her. After being sentenced to life imprisonment, Camila eventually gives birth to a beautiful baby girl in prison. Days later, a sudden fire engulfs the prison. Anguished and unable to find her newborn daughter, her last words exact revenge on every person who falsely accused her as she apparently perished in the flames.

18 years pass and urban legend fuses into reality as a group of teenagers headed by Elias Sanchez (Joshua Garcia) again tell the story of Camila. Playfully, they claim that on the day of the blood moon eclipse, the ghost of Camila will possess a new body and kickstart her vow for revenge. As if fulfilling the prophecy, a girl from nowhere, Emma Bonaobra (Janella Salvador) moves to the town. Securing a job as the town's mortuary cosmetologist, she is told of the tale of The Killer Bride but disbelieves it. Lo and behold, Emma wakes up possessed, gatecrashing the dela Torre family's grand party event claiming that she is the long-dead Camila, The Killer Bride. The entire town begin to question her motives. Is this a haunting chronicle that connects the rival dela Torre vs. dela Cuesta families who battled for land and politics—or is this simply a tale of The Killer Bride's spirit destined to curse the town?

== Cast and characters ==
The Killer Bride promotional poster.

=== Main ===
Camila dela Torre (Note: Camila used the alias Alba Almeida in her casino business as Camila dela Torre was already believed to have perished in the fire in the women's correctional.)
Played by: Maja Salvador

-The grandchild of Guada and Jacobo to Renato, she was falsely accused in killing Javier Dela Cuesta. When fire came in Women's Correctional, she seeks revenge on everyone who hurts her. She is rescued by Sharon's brother Fabio and eventually assume the identity of a crime boss named Alba Almeida. She adopts Emma from the streets and raises her like her own daughter, not realizing that she is actually her biological daughter. She eventually employs Emma in her revenge but is eventually exposed as alive. After being released on legal technicalities she is later killed by her aunt and returns to haunt her family and possess Emma for real before being put at rest by Vito, who reveals that Emma is their long-lost daughter.

Emma Bonaobra / Emma Sharon Serrano / Vida D. dela Cuesta (Note: Emma is the name given by the prison guard Aurora Bonaobra to the young Vida dela Torre-dela Cuesta when she took the child and raised her as her own. After Camila took Emma under her care, Fabio formally adopted Emma and gave her the name Emma Sharon Serrano, her second name being in honor of Fabio's deceased sister.)
Played by: Janella Salvador and Angelica Rama (young)

-the mortuary cosmetologist of Dako Pa Roon and the one who possessed by Camila. When she was an infant, she was adopted by Aurora after rescuing her from prison fire. When she is a child, she was adopted by Camila and Fabio unaware that she is Camila's long-lost daughter, Vida.

Elias Sanchez (Note: Elias' birth name is Elias Gonzales. He carries the last name Sanchez because he was legally adopted by Aran and Ingrid Sanchez)
Played by: Joshua Garcia and Yñigo Delen (young)

-the owner of Amalia's flowershop and Emma's/Vida's love interest. He is Vito's godson, which eventually creates parallels in her relationship with Emma/Vida with his godfather's relationship with Camila. He didn't believe on Killer Bride at first.

Vito Dela Cuesta
Played by: Geoff Eigenmann

-Camilla's lover who testifies against her on his brother's death. Distraught over his failing, he secretly pursues his own investigation into Camila's case while he struggles in his relationship with his wife and adopted daughter. He gradually reconciles with Camila shortly before her death and puts her at peace when he reveals that Emma is their lovechild.

=== The Dela Torre's ===
Alice Montero-Dela Torre / Belladonna / Killer Groom
Played by: Lara Quigaman

-Camila's doting Aunt and Juan Felipe's wife who turned out to be the Killer Groom and is having a secret affair with Luciano. She is responsible for the bombing of Las Espadas and along with Luciano, arranges the frame-up and presumed murder of Camila. After Camila resurfaces she arranges attacks on Camila's circle and has Camila killed for real, only to be haunted by her ghost. After attempting to shoot Emma, she is killed by her son and current town mayor Luis after being exposed as the villain.

Luciano Dela Torre
Played by: Cris Villanueva and Luke Alford (young)

-Jacobo and Guada's eldest child and Camila's uncle who wants to take over the family's business. Aside from Camila's predicament, he is also responsible for the unsolved murder of Camila's father and the pestilence that struck the town caused by his connections with a South African drug syndicate that stored chemicals in the plantation. He is exposed by Camila and killed by Fabio but warns her that he will be avenged by someone else. He has a secret affair with Alice in spite of her marriage to Juan Felipe.

Juan Felipe "Felipe" Dela Torre
Played by: James Blanco and JJ Quilantang (young)

-Jacobo and Guada's third child and also the Mayor of Las Espadas, the husband of Alice who is a closeted homosexual. He is responsible for a series of murders supposedly connected to the Killer Bride during Emma's first days in Las Espadas and is later imprisoned.

Doña Guada Dela Torre
Played by: Aurora Sevilla and Ingrid dela Paz (young)

-The Dela Torre matriach and the grandmother of Camila. A superstitious woman, she is intrigued by Emma's supposed possession by her "late" granddaughter.

Tatiana "Tati" Dela Torre
Played by: Ariella Arida

-the youngest and the only daughter of Jacobo and Guada. He is more close to Juan Felipe than her other siblings. She despises Camila when she calling her aunt. She was raped at her teenage years that leads to her pregnancy and killing her own baby. She keep this secret to her family to protect Juan Felipe's secret.

Luis Dela Torre
Played by: Sam Concepcion and Marco Masa (young)

-Jacobo's and Guada's grandson to Juan Felipe and Alice. He is Camila's cousin and Vida/Emma's uncle. A municipal councilor, he becomes Mayor after his father's arrest and the elimination of the line of succession following the bombing of Las Espadas. He becomes Emma's only friend in the Dela Torre family.

Don Jacobo Dela Torre
Played by: Eddie Gutierrez and Alex Castro (young)

-the Dela Torre patriach and the father of Renato, Luciano, Tatiana & Juan Felipe. He supports Camila on her trial and help her to escape but failed.

=== The Dela Cuestas' ===
Tessa Cruz-Dela Cuesta
Played by: Loren Burgos

-The wife of Vito and adoptive mother of Luna.

Luna Cruz-Dela Cuesta
Played by: Alexa Ilacad

-Vito and Tessa's adopted daughter. She has an unrequited love interest for Elias and hates Emma for standing in the way but later reconciles with her. She also owns the Killer Cafe, the town's favorite hangout. She claims that she is Camila's and Vito's long lost daughter, Vida.

Antonia Dela Cuesta
Played by: Jobelle Salvador

-Vito and Javier's mother. He also admires Fabio. She despises Camila believing that she is the one who killed her son, Javier.

Javier Dela Cuesta
Played by: Dominic Ochoa

-Vito's brother who is against in Vito and Camilla's relationship. His murder leads to Camila's imprisonment.

Police Chief Alejandro Dela Cuesta
Played by: Mike Lloren

-Vito's cousin and the police chief of Las Espadas.

=== Others ===
Marichu "Manay Ichu" Sagrado
Played by: Malou de Guzman

-Camila's nanny who treated Camila like her own daughter. She is also Andres' sister. She owns a funeral parlor business named "Dako Pa Roon" and hires Emma as a mortuary cosmetologist.

Fabio Serrano / Edmundo
Played by: Miko Raval

-The one who saved Camila from the prison fire. The brother of Camila's fellow prisoner named Sharon. He act as Emma's father after they legally adopted her. He works at Dela Cuestas as their family driver to gather information on them. He is killed by Alice.

Agnes Dimaguiba / Agnes Sagrado
Played by: Mara Lopez

-Alice's right hand and former friend of Camila who turns against her out of jealousy and is responsible for some of the Killer Bride murders. She died after fighting with Camila in her ghost form.

Ornusa Lim
Played by: Viveika Ravanes

-the person of Camilla inside Dela Torre who works as Guada's assistant. She is later killed by Alice.

Tsoknat Tumulak
Played by: Pamu Pamorada

-Dako Pa Roon's mortuary cosmetologist. She likes Intoy so much.

Intoy Ilagan
Played by: Neil Coleta

-Elias' bestfriend who also works in his flowershop.

Iking Isip
Played by: Pepe Herrera

-Manay Ichu's nephew who works as embalmer in his aunt's funeral parlor. A skeptic of the supernatural, his third eye opens up after the bombing of Las Espadas, which enables him to help Camila in her ghostly form. He dreams about the true story about Dela Torre and Dela Cuestas.

Ingrid Sanchez
Played by: Keanna Reeves

-Elias' adoptive mother.

Aran Sanchez
Played by: Eric Nicolas

-Elias' adoptive father.

Andres "Manoy" Del Pilar
Played by: Soliman Cruz

-Manay Ichu's brother who is a quack. He is employed by Luciano to frame Emma as the Killer Bride and a pestilence to the town but is drugged and rendered insane by Alice posing as the Killer Bride.

Aurora Bonaobra
Played by: Maricel Morales

-A former prisoner guard who starts the prison fire ordered by Luciano and Alice but adopts Vida and renamed her as Emma after the fire in prison, only to neglect her in the streets due to a drug addiction.

Matias Gonzales
Played by: Manuel Chua

-Elias' biological father. A former criminal, he fakes his death after his family is massacred except for Elias and returns after the Las Espadas bombing. He is later found to be involved with Luciano and Alice's shady dealings and is killed while trying to protect his son from the consequences of his involvement.

Mildred Dimalanta
Played by: Vivoree Esclito

-A member of Luna's circle of friends who is the only person friendly to Emma.

Mario Sandoval
Played by Charles "CK" Kieron

-One of Luna's friends.

Sonya
Played by: Melizza Jimenez

-One of Luna's friends.

=== Guests ===
Agot
Played by: Tanya Gomez

-a housemaid of Dela Torres. She despises Emma and Camila very much.

Belinda Dela Torre
Played by: Sammie Rimando

-Her affair with Armando Dela Cuesta starts the feud between Dela Torre and Dela Cuesta families.

Armando Dela Cuesta
Played by: Akihiro Blanco

-Belinda's lover.

Renato Dela Torre
Played by: Angelo Ilagan

-Camila's father. Luciano despised him so much because their father wants him to take his place in the future. Because of this, Luciano killed him.

Sharon Serrano
Played by: Karla Pambid

-Fabio's jailed sister who helps Camila during her imprisonment. She died in prison fire organized by Luciano and Alice.

Jorge Faeldonea
Played by: Kyle Velino

-A friend of Luna who dies in the bombing of Las Espadas

Benjamin Perez
Played by: Aldrin Angeles

-Luna's friend who was killed by someone who pretends as the killer bride.

Kayla Salamanca
Played by: Jessica Marco

-A friend of Luna who dies in the bombing of Las Espadas.

Amalia Gonzales
Played by: Mickey Ferriols

-Elias' biological mother. The flower shop owned by Elias is named after her.

Ivan Muñoz
Played by: Angelo Patrimonio

-Juan Felipe's aide. He is exposed as Juan Felipe's secret lover and is killed by Alice in revenge.

Marciana Campos
Played by: Ilonah Jean

-Mildred's aunt who becomes acting Mayor after Juan Felipe's arrest. She is killed in the bombing of Las Espadas, and is succeeded by Luis.

Seth
Played by: Marco Gallo

-The playboy schoolmate of Emma. He makes Emma fall in love on him.

Marvin Cruz
Played by: Kokoy de Santos

-The video editor who was allegedly paid by Juan Felipe's rival to manipulate and spread his video scandal.

Chona
Played by: Tart Carlos

-A Dela Torre housemaid who works for Camila to spy on Dela Torres.

Alexis Dela Torre
Played by: Rayt Carreon

-Luciano's son who has own advertising agency in Makati.

David Dela Torre
Played by: Victor Robinson III

-Luciano's son who studied in Harvard Business School.

Lizette Dela Torre
Played by: Yanah Laurel

-Luciano's daughter who works in Wall Street

Justino De Vera
Played by: Jordan Hong

-The one who raped Tati.

- Cheska Iñigo as Elena Sanchez
- Christopher Roxas as Big Boss
- Mario Capalad as Omar
- Ruby Ruiz as Agnes' mother

Notes

Joshua Garcia and Janella Salvador reunited in Mars Ravelo's Darna with Jane de Leon

== Broadcast ==
The Killer Bride premiered on ABS-CBN on August 12, 2019, replacing Sino Ang Maysala?: Mea Culpa. It aired weeknights at 9:15 PM PST on the network's Primetime Bida evening block and worldwide via TFC. The show concluded on January 17, 2020, and was replaced by A Soldier's Heart beginning January 20, 2020.

It aired re-runs on Jeepney TV from November 9, 2020 to January 29, 2021; replacing the re-runs of Wildflower and was replaced by the re-runs of Hanggang Saan. It also aired re-runs on Kapamilya Channel's Kapamilya Gold afternoon block, Kapamilya Online Live, and A2Z's Zuper Hapon from July 29, 2024 to January 3, 2025; replacing the re-runs of Darna 2022 and was replaced by the re-runs of Viral Scandal.

An extended version of the series, The Killer Bride: Killer Cuts, streamed exclusively on iWant and ran concurrently with the series. Killer Cuts showed the primetime series’ unrated and uncensored scenes.

== Production ==
Series lead Maja Salvador was supposed to do another series which would have been the follow-up to the wildly successful Wildflower. However, as the series was to tackle marital infidelity, which she has already done in The Legal Wife, she turned down the role to pursue The Killer Bride. Maja Salvador landed the role in May 2019 when, while doing iWant Originals Hinahanap-hanap Kita with The Killer Bride co-stars Geoff Eigenmann, Pepe Herrera and Pamu Pamorada, she convinced Business Unit Manager, Roda C. Dela Cerna to let her audition for the role. Although there was trepidation on the part of Dela Cerna as she knew Salvador was supposed to do another series, she nevertheless allowed Salvador to audition because the original actress tapped for the role ultimately turned down the part of Camila.

The project Salvador turned down was Ang Lihim ni Ligaya, with Ivana Alawi taking over the lead.

The show and the cast was first announced by ABS-CBN on June 28, 2019.

The project serves as a reunion project for Maja Salvador and leading man Geoff Eigenmann, who has just returned from his stint in the GMA Network. The two have previously worked together on the film Villa Estrella and was also set to star in the teleserye Moon River that was shelved and ultimately did not push through after Eigenmann's move to GMA Network.

The series would also see many "firsts" for series lead Janella Salvador. The series would mark the first time she would work with real-life aunts, Maja Salvador and Jobelle Salvador. The series would also see her being paired for the first time with Joshua Garcia, who was previously paired with perrenial loveteam partner and ex-girlfriend Julia Barretto.

The series was partially shot in Laguna.

== Reception ==
The Killer Bride has been well-received by viewers and netizens alike with the show's episodes not only obtaining good ratings but also making for top trending topics.

The show has been praised for its writing, its twists in particular being cited for subverting the horror genre. These twists in the story have themselves become top trending topics on their own. The show has likewise been praised for integrating a measure of social commentary on its scenes and its dialogue.

=== Ratings ===
From its pilot episode, The Killer Bride proved itself as a hit by recording a high pilot episode rating of 23.1%. In the same month as its debut, the show was pitted against a new rival which it managed to beat in the ratings and also saw the show registering its highest rating, 25.6% for its August 30, 2019, episode. This was notable because its timeslot normally sees a steep decline in ratings. While its finale rating is noticeably smaller as compared to its peak and its pilot rating, its finale rating of 19.3% is still considered a success in comparison to the show it was pitted against as shown by it being the fifth most watched program on the day of its finale.

Kantar Media National TV Ratings (9:30PM PST)
| Pilot Episode | Finale Episode | Peak | Average |
|---|---|---|---|
| 23.1% August 12, 2019 | 19.3% January 17, 2020 | 25.6% August 30, 2019 | 18.1% |

| |-

== Accolades ==
Accolades received by The Killer Bride
| Year | Award giving body | Category | Nominated work | Results | Source |
|---|---|---|---|---|---|
| 2020 | Asian Academy Creative Awards 2020 | Best Telenovela (National Winner) | The Killer Bride | Won | |
| 2020 | Asian Academy Creative Awards 2020 | Best Telenovela | The Killer Bride | Nominated | |
