= First African Baptist Church (Tuscaloosa, Alabama) =

Historic church in Alabama, United States

- U.S. National Register of Historic Places
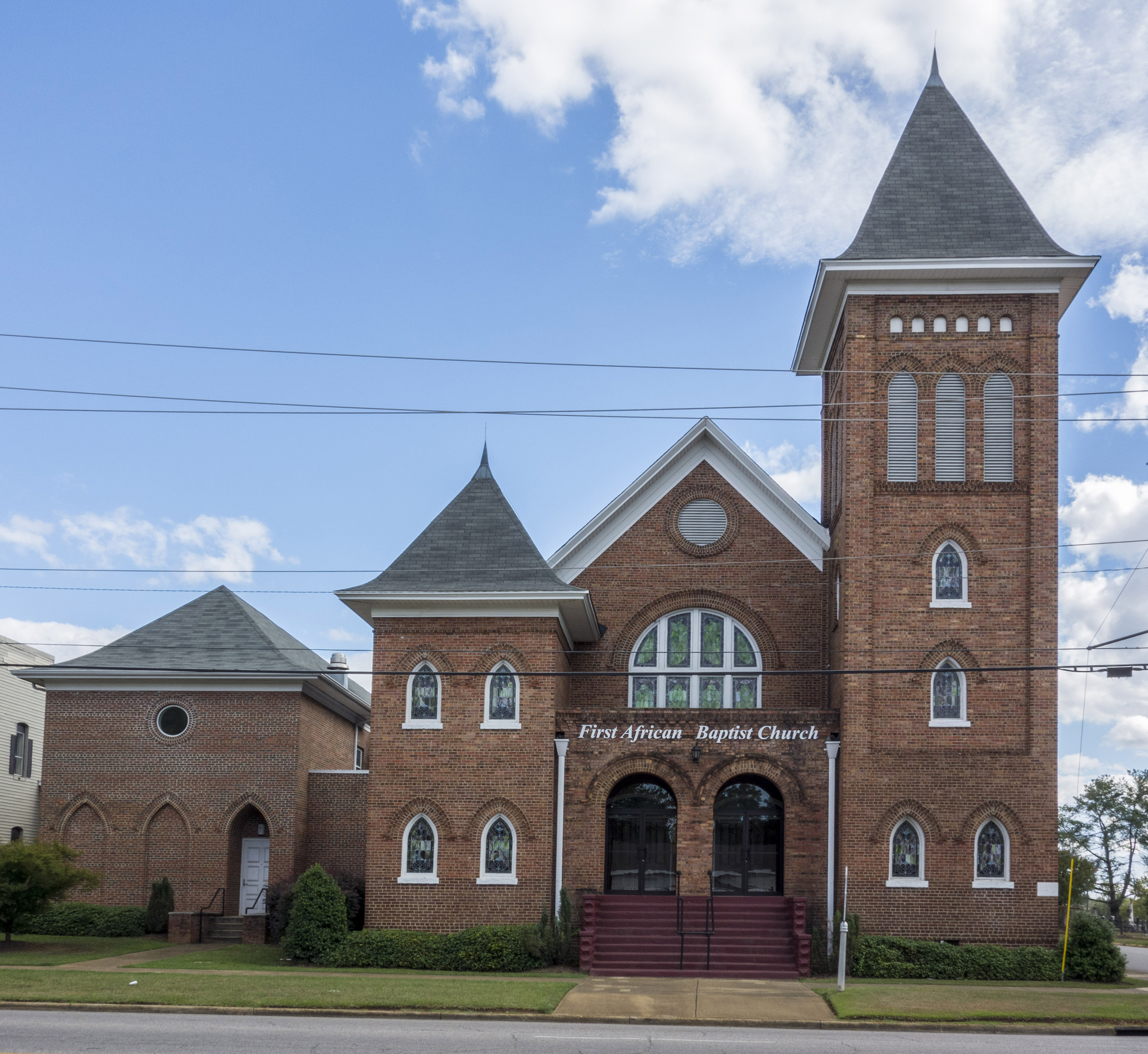
- First African Baptist Church, Tuscaloosa

- Location within Alabama Location within the United States
- Location: 2621 Stillman Boulevard, Tuscaloosa, Alabama
- Coordinates: 33°12′17″N 87°34′14″W
- Area: less than one acre
- Built: 1907
- Built by: George Clopton, William Medlock
- NRHP reference No.: 88001580
- Added to NRHP: September 28, 1988

First African Baptist Church is a Baptist church located in Tuscaloosa, Alabama. It is affiliated with the National Baptist Convention, USA.

It was built in 1907 from a congregation established in 1866, and was added to the National Register of Historic Places in 1988.

== History ==
The historical marker outside the church reads:

Organized November 1866, with 144 members. The Rev. Prince Murrell, first pastor, served until 1885. A church building located at corner of 4th Street and 24th Avenue was purchased and became place of worship during pastorate of the Rev. James Mason, 1885-1891. Resolution passed in this church 1873 resulted in establishment of Selma University, Selma, Alabama.

Present structure erected 1907 under leadership of the Rev. J. H. Smith. Church annex completed and adjoining property purchased during pastorate of the Rev. W. B. Shealey, 1952-1957. Education building and new parsonage constructed during term of the Rev. T. Y. Rogers, Jr., 1963-1971.

=== Bloody Tuesday (1964) ===
The Church was the site of a civil rights incident on Tuesday, June 9, 1964, during which peaceful protestors were beaten, arrested, and tear-gassed by Tuscaloosa police officers and a mob of white citizens. The protestors gathered at the church and attempted to march to the Tuscaloosa County courthouse a few blocks away. Sparking their protest was the long-standing Jim Crow laws that resulted in segregated drinking fountains and restrooms at the Courthouse. They did not get very far before the police and the white mob attacked them.

Thirty-three African-American men, women, and children were hospitalized. The police brutality led the incident to be labelled "Bloody Tuesday". It occurred over a year before the "Bloody Sunday" events during the Selma to Montgomery marches, but did not receive as much media coverage as the later conflict.
