= Blue Monday (term) =

American colloquial term associated with drinking

In American literature of the 1830s, Blue Monday referred to the hungover state of the labor workforce after a weekend spent drinking, and the association of the color blue with a depressed state of mind.

In the 1860s, the term began to be applied to a weekly home "wash day." White clothing was sometimes rinsed with bluing, however the relevance of this fact to the nickname for Mondays is contested, and the name may simply carry over from the earlier usage.
