= Bloody Tuesday (1964) =

1964 civil rights march in Tuscaloosa, Alabama, USA

- Part of the Civil Rights Movement
- Date: June 9, 1964
- Location: Tuscaloosa, Alabama
- Caused by: Racial segregation in the Tuscaloosa County Courthouse

Parties
Tuscaloosa Citizens for Action Committee (TCAC)	Tuscaloosa County Commission; Tuscaloosa Police Department

Lead figures
TCAC member: T. Y. Rogers	Police Chief: William Marable

Bloody Tuesday was a march that occurred on June 9, 1964, in Tuscaloosa, Alabama, during the Civil Rights Movement. The march was both organized and led by Rev. T. Y. Rogers and was to protest against segregated drinking fountains and restrooms in the county courthouse. The protest consisted of a group of peaceful African Americans walking from The First African Baptist Church to the Tuscaloosa County Courthouse; however, protesters did not get very far before being beaten, arrested, and tear gassed by not only police officers standing outside the church, but a mob of angry white citizens as well.

These events were similar to Bloody Sunday during the Selma to Montgomery marches, which took place a year later and received an extensive amount of media coverage, while there were no journalists to capture the events of Bloody Tuesday. During Bloody Tuesday thirty-three men, women, and children had to be hospitalized, and ninety-four African Americans were arrested by police, this all taking place right outside the church with the marchers not having an opportunity to get to the courthouse.

== Background ==
Throughout the 1960s, there were a number of demonstrations that took place in Alabama. During this era, Martin Luther King Jr. was a well known leader in Alabama as an advocate for equal rights. One of these demonstrations took place on June 9, 1964, in Tuscaloosa, Alabama. The demonstration was organized by Rev. T. Y. Rogers who was installed by King to lead the Civil Rights activities in Tuscaloosa. Many documents from the Tuscaloosa County Sheriff's office produced during the time of the election riots predicted that in the summer of 1964, the laws of the State of Alabama would be challenged.

Along with the documents, the sheriff's office also had a copy of Handbook for Freedom and Army Recruits written by King. The commission to Preserve Peace, which was a force in Alabama trying to stop movements and protests, knew from the handbook that over the course of the year 1964, there would be multitudes of civil rights activities across the state, all commissioned by King. The handbook also stated that on an unknown date that spring volunteers would be called to "report to duty" to participate in a variety of protests and marches across Alabama. There was reason to believe that Tuscaloosa would be one of the starting towns in leading these types of movements, and when the organization process of the march became known to the county's police, it became a threat to the town.

Other documents from the sheriffs office seem to be inaccurate, as the Peace Commission not only believed the demonstrations at the time were negative, but also were very focused on communism, and strived to expose many organizations during that period as subversive.

== Purpose of the march ==
The main reason for the march was to get the Tuscaloosa County Courthouse to remove both segregated drinking fountains and restrooms in the building. This was one of the small steps groups of African Americans were taking across the state of Alabama to promote desegregation in public accommodations. During the rebuilding of the new courthouse, there were claims made that it would be completely integrated. However this was not the case, and at the dedication on April 12, 1964, for the new building, African Americans came only to see that there were still Jim Crow signs hung up. It was also witnessed that there were restrooms and drinking fountains with signs up indicating separate facilities for African Americans.

Wanting to interfere with the signs specifying separate restrooms and drinking fountains, the Tuscaloosa Citizens for Action Committee began meeting with the County Commission in an attempt to receive their original promise of an integrated courthouse and a guarantee to get the signs removed from the courthouse. These request were all denied, and there was nothing the committee could do about it. Despite this refusal they were still pledged to getting an integrated courthouse and started getting together weekly in order to solve the issue at hand. Every Monday night mass, meetings were held by Rev. T. Y. Rogers at The First African Baptist church where they planned a march to protest against these segregated facilities. Although police chief William Marable declined the request to march, the group was determined to march anyway, at the risk of getting arrested.

== Eve of the march ==
On June 8, 1964, the night before the organized march would take place, the group of protesters gathered in the First African Baptist Church, where they would also begin the march the next day, for one last speech by Rev. T. Y. Rogers, who was the pastor of the church and the head of the Tuscaloosa Citizens for Action Committee.

Rev. T. Y. Rogers came to The First African Baptist Church after being appointed by Martin Luther King Jr. to lead the movement in Tuscaloosa in 1964. He was an optimistic and determined leader and was able to get many people of all ages involved in the march, from young teenagers to adults. His meetings grew larger and more people began attending the Monday night mass, and with the growing number of attendees the citizens became more enthusiastic and would start to sing We Shall Overcome, stomping and clapping their hands and feet. His aim, which was to take action for the denied requests, had been met and he was able to convince people about the importance of the march.

During their last meeting, the reverend gave instructions and orders about the morning of, explaining how the march would hopefully play out. He implied that there should be no reason to stop marching, and even if somebody fell directly in front of them, to simply walk over them and keep marching. If they wanted to make a difference, their time to act needed to be now, he explained. The audience left the church that night prepared to come back the next morning with the possibility of being arrested, as they were going to be marching without a permit.

== Day of the march ==
On June 9, 1964, at around 9 am, over 500 people gathered at the First African Baptist Church to march, many were aware that they were disobeying the ban on the march given out by Tuscaloosa Police. The protestors organized within the church then stepped out, led by Rev. Rogers and other TCAC leaders and were met by Tuscaloosa Police and white neighbors, many in both groups armed with clubs, sticks, or cattle prods.

Rev. Rogers was confronted by Chief of Police William Marable and asked if he still planned to march. Rogers answered affirmatively, then he and the other TCAC leaders were subsequently arrested. The rest of the demonstrators marched on, attempting to reach the courthouse. However, they were soon pushed back into the church by force from the police and bystanders.

The following morning, June 9, 1964, protesters started arriving at The First African Baptist Church around 9 that morning. Waiting for them outside were police men and white residents, and with them fire trucks and paddy wagons. The marchers started to gather in lines of two by two out the front doors of the church at 10:15 in the morning. Marables first arrested Rogers and other leaders of the group before the march could leave the church. When police ordered them back inside the church, the marchers ignored their commands, and continued walking out the doors.

Before the marchers could get as far as 50 feet, there was an outbreak of chaos. The police became very violent towards the peaceful marchers, and were waiting outside the church with billy clubs, ready to charge the marchers. The protesters were beaten by police, and pushed back inside the church, where police also fired tear gas through the windows. The police attempted to arrest all protesters both inside and outside the church, but a few managed to escape the scene. On top of the police brutality, the angry mob of white residents charged the group as well, using billy clubs, baseball bats, cattle prods, fire hoses, and other weapons. The farthest any protesters were able to get was the Van Hoose funeral home, before being beaten and arrested.

Many of the injuries were detrimental such as nearly losing an eye like 21 year old Maxie Thomas. There was a total of ninety-four arrests made by police, and thirty-three men women and children were hospitalized by the incident. The number of injured civilians was close to the number during "Bloody Sunday" the following year.

== Aftermath ==
After the brutal and chaotic events that occurred on June 9, 1964, during the marched protest to the Tuscaloosa County Courthouse, the Tuscaloosa Citizens For Action Committee was later able to see progress from the march, putting aside the deaths and losses they had to face.

Later in June of that year, Rogers and his committee of protesters were still set on removing the signs indicating segregation in the courthouse, and Rogers took city officials to court on the issue in order to attempt to get the signs taken down. On June 25, 1964, the county was ordered by Federal Judge Seybourn Lynne to get rid of the discriminatory signs, and in less than a week they were no longer present. As well, the group did eventually get their peaceful march to the courthouse later that summer; however, it did take time as Rogers had to persistently try to work out a deal with the police. The Civil Rights Act of 1964 was also very helpful in initiating the second march to happen.

Police did not keep much record of reports from Bloody Tuesday, which is one of the reasons why there are so few details about this movement. The local newspapers who wrote about the march did not seem to report much on violence in their first day accounts, and in The Tuscaloosa News, it was claimed that the protesters threw bottles and rocks at the police officers, which injured some of them. On the second day, the newspapers seemed to report more on violent accounts, although still not very thoroughly, and seemed to be very partial to the police and officials involved. One article explained that marches and anti-segregation protests could only be permitted if it was agreed to let the police take charge of the situation with no interfering from the protesters. When Mayor George M. Van Tassel spoke out, he claimed how patient Tuscaloosa had been with the protest groups, and how even though their plan of action was regrettable, they warned them about the violence to come if they followed through with the march and they chose to ignore the authorities, which gave the police no choice but to intervene. The event was largely overlooked during the Civil Rights Era, and was not seen as an important detail to the time period.

== Media coverage ==
Although Bloody Tuesday was very similar to many local movements during the Civil Right Movement (Stand in the Schoolhouse Door or the Selma to Montgomery marches), one factor separates this movement from others: journalists and the national news were not there to capture the events. Since there were certain circumstances during the time of the protest that prevented it from large amounts of media coverage, it was largely ignored by the press. These circumstances include that no national TV networks were notified about the march, and it did not involve a famous leader of the time such as Martin Luther King Jr. In present-day it can be hard to find much evidence on this event in relation to Civil Rights Movement, with most timelines and historic websites likely to skip past it and onto Bloody Sunday.

== See also ==
- Bloody Monday (Danville)
