= Bloody Friday =

Bloody Friday may refer to:

- Bloody Friday (1919), also known as the Battle of George Square, a riot in Glasgow in 1919
- Bloody Friday (Minneapolis), a police shooting of pickets in Minneapolis in 1934
- Bloody Friday (1968), demonstrations against the Brazilian military regime and civil responses to police repression
- Hard Hat Riot, also known as Bloody Friday, a May 8, 1970, an attack by New York City construction workers on students protesting the Vietnam War
- Bloody Friday (1972), a series of bombings by the Provisional Irish Republican Army
- Bloody Friday (1993), an ethnic cleansing against the Kongo during the Angolan Civil War
- Bloody Friday (1998), a confrontation between university students and police forces during the May 1998 riots in Indonesia
- Bloody Friday, the stock market crash on 24 October in the 2008 financial crisis
- Bloody Friday (2015), a series of terrorist attacks, involving mainly the Islamic State of Iraq and the Levant, which occurred on June 26
- Bloody Friday (film), a 1972 German-Italian crime film
- Bloody Friday (2022), a massacre of protesters by regime forces in Zahedan, Iran
- Bloody Friday, 9 October for 2026 Poland school attacks

== See also ==
- Black Friday (disambiguation)
- Friday the 13th
