= Black Friday etymology hoax =

Hoax claims about the origin of Black Friday

In 2018, a viral Facebook post made the false claim that the term "Black Friday" derives from a day when slave traders sold slaves at a discount. The name given to the Friday after Thanksgiving in the United States, a day that traditionally marks the start of the Christmas shopping season, actually originates from a 19th-century financial crisis.

== True origin ==
The term "Black Friday" was first used in relation to a 19th-century financial crisis. Wall Street financiers Jay Gould and Jim Fisk attempted to corner the gold market and failed after their conspiracy was derailed. On Friday, September 24, 1869, the gold market crashed and caused the stock market to suffer losses affecting practically everyone in the nation, many to the point of bankruptcy.

The link between the term and retailing begins in 1939, when U.S. president Franklin D. Roosevelt issued a presidential proclamation, subsequently reinforced by an act of Congress, which set the day of Thanksgiving to be the fourth Thursday in November rather than the last Thursday as it was until then. The change, in effect, lengthened the Christmas shopping season with whose start Thanksgiving had been traditionally tied.

In the 1950s, "Black Friday" became associated with a specific social disturbance, and indirectly with retail finances. The annual Army-Navy football game was traditionally held in Philadelphia, Pennsylvania, on the Saturday after Thanksgiving and was drawing a significant number of visitors. Local retailers began offering significant discounts the day before the game to attract these new potential customers. Philadelphia police began calling the day "Black Friday" because of the headaches the large crowds caused for them. As the discounting practice spread, followed by sales' increases, many businesses subsequently started using the term "Black Friday" to denote the day when their accounting logs went "from red ink to black".

In the late 1980s, the term was re-invented and promoted by retailers to denote the discounts offered to the seasonal shoppers and it spread nationwide across the United States. Through the years, discount-offer days using the "Black Friday" moniker were used for additional dates of the year, such as Amazon's "Black Friday in July" of 2015. Additionally, the use of the term for discount-offer Fridays spread beyond the U.S.

It remains the prevalent use of the term. (Note: Retailers have tried to avoid the "negative" adjective "Black" and tried for "Big Friday" but the name did not catch on. See Butterly (2014))

== The hoax ==
Internet posts have falsely claimed that the term "Black Friday" was originally used for "the day after Thanksgiving" when slave traders sold slaves at a discount for the upcoming winter. One of the posts was accompanied by a "1904 photo" claiming to show African slaves in America, but which actually depicts Aboriginal prisoners in Wyndham, Australia from around that time. The image dates from at least 2013, and appeared on Facebook in 2018 and 2019.

It is one of many "fanciful" claims that have surfaced over time due to the term's distant and convoluted historical provenance but it caught on and remains a viral phenomenon that regularly appears around the time of the eponymous holiday, on various social media platforms, including Twitter.

The claim has been debunked as a hoax by experts and the media, including African online media and fact-checking websites, but was still in circulation in 2019.

== See also ==
- Cyber Monday
- Slavery in the United States
- List of hoaxes
