= List of The Killer Bride episodes =

The Killer Bride is a 2019 Philippine drama television series starring Maja Salvador, Janella Salvador, Joshua Garcia and Geoff Eigenmann.

== Series overview ==
Season	Episodes	Originally released	
Season	Episodes	First released	Last released
1	115	August 12, 2019	January 17, 2020

== Episodes ==
=== Season 1 ===
No. overall	No. in season	Title	Original release date	Kantar Media Ratings (nationwide)
1	1	"First Dance"	August 12, 2019	23.1%
2	2	"First Blood"	August 13, 2019	23.3%
3	3	"First Curse"	August 14, 2019	23.7%
4	4	"First Meet"	August 15, 2019	23.7%
5	5	"First Encounter"	August 16, 2019	22.1%
6	6	"Gone Viral"	August 19, 2019	19.6%
7	7	"Bride Fishing"	August 20, 2019	21.0%
8	8	"Bride Bullying"	August 21, 2019	21.7%
9	9	"Blame Game"	August 22, 2019	22.2%
10	10	"Power Tripping"	August 23, 2019	23.9%
11	11	"First Victim"	August 26, 2019	20.2%
12	12	"SOS"	August 27, 2019	20.9%
13	13	"Face of Fear"	August 28, 2019	22.0%
14	14	"Showtime"	August 29, 2019	24.6%
15	15	"Revenger Squad"	August 30, 2019	25.6%
16	16	"In Your Area"	September 2, 2019	23.1%
17	17	"Training Ground"	September 3, 2019	23.7%
18	18	"Warning"	September 4, 2019	22.2%
19	19	"Calling"	September 5, 2019	23.1%
20	20	"Shookt"	September 6, 2019	22.9%
21	21	"Dig Dig Dig"	September 9, 2019	20.3%
22	22	"Pa-victim"	September 10, 2019	19.8%
23	23	"Oh My G"	September 11, 2019	20.9%
24	24	"Triggered"	September 12, 2019	21.1%
25	25	"Pain Game"	September 13, 2019	20.5%
26	26	"Attack"	September 16, 2019	20.3%
27	27	"In A Snap"	September 17, 2019	21.8%
28	28	"Abduction"	September 18, 2019	20.9%
29	29	"Run for Life"	September 19, 2019	21.4%
30	30	"Conspiracy"	September 20, 2019	19.3%
31	31	"No More Lies"	September 23, 2019	18.6%
32	32	"Reality Strikes"	September 24, 2019	17.7%
33	33	"Unveiling"	September 25, 2019	19.5%
34	34	"Come Out"	September 26, 2019	17.4%
35	35	"Nightmares"	September 27, 2019	17.8%
36	36	"Escape"	September 30, 2019	20.1%
37	37	"Payback"	October 1, 2019	18.2%
38	38	"Freak Out"	October 2, 2019	17.8%
39	39	"Off Limits"	October 3, 2019	20.0%
40	40	"Threatened"	October 4, 2019	17.8%
41	41	"Kill This Love"	October 7, 2019	16.3%
42	42	"Saving Emma"	October 8, 2019	17.5%
43	43	"Unplanned"	October 9, 2019	17.3%
44	44	"Beast Mode"	October 10, 2019	17.8%
45	45	"Obstruction"	October 11, 2019	17.0%
46	46	"Nostalgia"	October 14, 2019	17.5%
47	47	"Great Pretender"	October 15, 2019	14.9%
48	48	"Bloodshed"	October 16, 2019	15.3%
49	49	"Mourning"	October 17, 2019	15.6%
50	50	"Panic"	October 18, 2019	17.2%
51	51	"Hunting"	October 21, 2019	17.3%
52	52	"Own Justice"	October 22, 2019	16.6%
53	53	"Death Stroke"	October 23, 2019	17.8%
54	54	"Downfall"	October 24, 2019	17.8%
55	55	"Death Row"	October 25, 2019	16.9%
56	56	"Backtrack"	October 28, 2019	18.5%
57	57	"Backlash"	October 29, 2019	15.9%
58	58	"Rush Hour"	October 30, 2019	16.4%
59	59	"Face of the Past"	October 31, 2019	16.4%
60	60	"Rise from Dead"	November 1, 2019	15.7%
61	61	"Hide and Seek"	November 4, 2019	18.6%
62	62	"Vito vs Fabio"	November 5, 2019	15.0%
63	63	"Face Off"	November 6, 2019	17.4%
64	64	"Living Curse"	November 7, 2019	18.1%
65	65	"Trapped"	November 8, 2019	17.1%
66	66	"Unfolding"	November 11, 2019	14.9%
67	67	"Ride or Die"	November 12, 2019	15.3%
68	68	"Poisonous Truth"	November 13, 2019	16.0%
69	69	"Proof"	November 14, 2019	15.0%
70	70	"Exposé"	November 15, 2019	17.4%
71	71	"Unstoppable"	November 18, 2019	17.6%
72	72	"Killer Clash"	November 19, 2019	16.1%
73	73	"Killer Takes All"	November 20, 2019	15.8%
74	74	"Killer Truth"	November 21, 2019	16.0%
75	75	"Resurrection"	November 22, 2019	17.9%
76	76	"Blackout"	November 25, 2019	17.6%
77	77	"Vulnerable"	November 26, 2019	18.5%
78	78	"Homecoming"	November 27, 2019	14.3%
79	79	"Guilt Kill"	November 28, 2019	16.0%
80	80	"Judgment"	November 29, 2019	15.7%
81	81	"Rivalry"	December 2, 2019	14.9%
82	82	"Dark Secret"	December 3, 2019	13.4%
83	83	"DilEMMA"	December 4, 2019	13.8%
84	84	"Trust and Lies"	December 5, 2019	16.0%
85	85	"True Vida"	December 6, 2019	15.8%
86	86	"Take Back"	December 9, 2019	16.6%
87	87	"Suspicion"	December 10, 2019	14.9%
88	88	"Serial Killer"	December 11, 2019	15.6%
89	89	"Next in Line"	December 12, 2019	16.8%
90	90	"Friday the 13th"	December 13, 2019	16.7%
91	91	"The Killer Bride vs. Killer Groom"	December 16, 2019	17.1%
92	92	"Confrontation"	December 17, 2019	15.6%
93	93	"Vengeance"	December 18, 2019	14.7%
94	94	"Killer Facts"	December 19, 2019	15.1%
95	95	"Price to Pay"	December 20, 2019	14.2%
96	96	"Choose Only One"	December 23, 2019	15.9%
97	97	"Noche Bomba"	December 24, 2019	15.6%
98	98	"The Killer Bride is Coming to Town"	December 25, 2019	12.8%
99	99	"Terrified"	December 26, 2019	16.2%
100	100	"Scared to Death"	December 27, 2019	15.9%
101	101	"Bloody Torture"	December 30, 2019	18.0%
102	102	"Bloody Countdown"	December 31, 2019	16.9%
103	103	"Bloody New Year"	January 1, 2020	13.9%
104	104	"Bloody Angry"	January 2, 2020	15.9%
105	105	"Bloody Caution"	January 3, 2020	16.3%
106	106	"Deadly Secret"	January 6, 2020	15.7%
107	107	"Deadly Cover Up"	January 7, 2020	15.8%
108	108	"Deadly Offer"	January 8, 2020	17.3%
109	109	"Deadly Match"	January 9, 2020	19.2%
110	110	"Deadly End"	January 10, 2020	18.5%
111	111	"Killer Fate"	January 13, 2020	18.0%
112	112	"Killer Return"	January 14, 2020	18.2%
113	113	"Killer Ghost"	January 15, 2020	17.6%
114	114	"Ultimate Attack"	January 16, 2020	19.1%
115	115	"Killer Finale"	January 17, 2020	19.3%
