= Black Sunday (2005) =

New York City Fire Department deaths

- Date: January 23, 2005
- Location: 236 East 178th Street, The Bronx, New York City, U.S.; Jerome Street, Brooklyn, New York City, U.S.
- Type: Tenement and house fire
- Deaths: 3
- Injuries: 4

Black Sunday has been used to describe January 23, 2005, when three firefighters of the New York City Fire Department (FDNY) died in two fires: two at a tenement fire in the Morris Heights section of the Bronx, with four others being seriously injured, and one at a house fire in the East New York section of Brooklyn. It was the deadliest day for the FDNY since the World Trade Center attack on September 11, 2001, and the first time since 1918 that firefighters had died at two separate incidents on the same day.

== Fires ==
=== Bronx fire ===
The Bronx fire started on the third floor of a tenement at 236 East 178th Street off the Grand Concourse, and may have been caused by an extension cord to a portable heater setting fire to a mattress. Three alarms were called: Engine Company 42, Ladder Company 33, Ladder Company 27, and Rescue Company 3 were involved in fighting the fire. The alarm call was made at 7:59 a.m., one day after a blizzard, and snow hampered the engines in reaching the address; the closest hydrant was frozen, and some hoses were either frozen or cracked.

The apartments had been illegally subdivided using drywall partitions. Six firefighters on the fourth floor were trapped when the fire flashed through the door of the apartment, and at 8:30 to 8:32 a.m., unable to find a fire escape, they jumped from the windows. Only two had an escape rope, which one of them had bought for himself. Two were killed in the fall: John G. Bellew and Lieutenant Curtis W. Meyran, who was in command of Ladder 27. The other four, Brendan Cawley, Jeff Cool, Joe DiBernardo, and Gene Stolowski, were severely injured and disabled and had to retire. DiBernardo died six years later; he had been promoted to lieutenant in May 2005 and Bellew received a posthumous promotion.

=== Brooklyn fire ===
The Brooklyn fire, later the same day, was in the basement of a two-family house on Jerome Street in East New York. People attending a birthday party reported smelling smoke; a group of firefighters from Ladder Company 103 who were investigating withdrew from the basement when the heat became too intense, but one, Richard T. Sclafani, did not come out and was found unconscious on the stairs after apparently catching his equipment on a coat rack. He was pronounced dead at Brookdale Medical Center, bringing the total number of firefighter deaths that day to three, the highest number in one day since the 9/11 attack on the World Trade Center and, unusually, in two separate fires.

== Investigation ==
The department's official report on the Bronx fire, issued in September 2005, stated that safety ropes would have been helpful; the department had ceased the practice of issuing ropes to all firefighters in 2000, citing their bulky size and general disuse, with cost also speculated as a factor. The department resumed the practice of giving safety ropes to firefighters by October 2005. Beginning in 2006, FDNY firefighters have been equipped with a hook, a rope and a sliding mechanism. The report also blamed the firefighters for poor communication and for remaining too long on the fourth floor given the conditions, and those operating the pump for poor understanding of the equipment.

== Legal aftermath ==
The FDNY assigned a large part of the blame for the deaths to the building code violation for the subdivision of the apartment. The Bronx County District Attorney charged the landlord and two tenants in connection with the deaths. In criminal trials in 2009 the tenants, who had erected the partition, were found not guilty of criminally negligent homicide and reckless endangerment, while two former owners of the building were found guilty, but the verdict was reversed a year later.

The surviving firefighters and the families of those who were killed announced their intention to file lawsuits against the city over the lack of safety ropes. The civil suit began in September 2015. Meyran's family reached a settlement; in February 2016 a New York State Supreme Court jury awarded damages of $183 million to the remaining five, of which approximately $140 million was to be paid by the city and the rest by one of the former owners. The families had reached a settlement with the former owner shortly before and, in September 2016, settled with the city for $29.5 million.

== Memorials ==
Annually, friends, family and colleagues gather on a January Saturday morning for an 11 a.m. memorial mass and service at Brooklyn Ladder 103 and Bronx Engine 46 Ladder 27 to pay homage to the trio.

New York City Fire Department (FDNY) dedicated a plaque honoring Lieutenants John Bellew and Curtis Meyran a year after Black Sunday. Hundreds of firefighters from the City joined family and friends standing in the rain without complaint. New York City Fire Commissioner Nicholas Scoppetta said “The plaque dedication is a department tradition; a way we pay respect to our lost firefighters. It is the department’s way of reaffirming the promise each and every firefighter makes to his fellow firefighter. It is another way of saying we will never forget. It is our job today, and in the days to come, to ensure that they are not forgotten – to continue the work of these men.” Terry Bellew, John's brother spoke: “These men were doing what they loved when they met their fate.”

Richard Sclafani had a similarly well attended ceremony at the Brooklyn firehouse attended by Mayor Michael Bloomberg. The Mayor said, “Every day, firefighters risk their lives for people they’ve never met. January 23 was no different. These men will always be remembered as heroes.” Mayor Bloomberg held Firefighter Sclafani's mother's hand whilst his sister spoke: “I have always felt the strength of my brother. We will always love him, and we will never forget.”
