= Black Saturday (France) =

Busiest day of the year for road traffic

Black Saturday (samedi noir in French) refers, in France, to the day of the year when road traffic is most dense due to the many departures on holiday. (Traffic problems are exacerbated by France's extreme centralisation, with Paris being the hub of the entire national highway network.) This Saturday is usually at the end of July, though in 2007 both the last Saturday of July and the first Saturday of August were designated as Black Saturdays.

The Autoroute du Soleil, the highway to the south of France and Spain, is usually particularly busy. In 2004 there was more than 700 kilometres (430 mi) in accumulated traffic congestion.

The black colour is the qualification with which the French government web site Bison Futé designates a day with extrêmement dense (extremely busy) traffic. The French newspapers call this day samedi noir after Bison Futé's designation. Usually, the French call these days les jours de grands départs (days of great departures). In Dutch, this French phenomenon was known as zwarte zaterdag long before the French adopted the term samedi noir, both meaning (literally) Black Saturday.

The term Black Saturday may also refer to Saturday July 31, 1982, when the worst road accident in French history happened. Around 1:45 AM, a coach collided into passenger cars near Beaune in dense holiday traffic during rainfall. The collision and subsequent fire killed 53 people, among which 46 were children. After this crash, a regulation was enforced to prohibit the transportation of groups of children during this part of the year.

== See also ==
- List of road accidents
- Beaune coach crash
