= Black Saturday (1621) =

Dark, stormy day in Scotland, taken as a sign of Armageddon

Black Saturday was a particularly dark, stormy Saturday in Scotland, on 4 August 1621. Many regarded the foul weather as a judgment of Heaven against the Five Articles of Perth then passed in the Scots Parliament tending to establish Episcopacy.

Many suicides were recorded on this day, as some saw the foul weather as a preparatory for Armageddon.

== See also ==
- Divine retribution
- Five Articles of Perth
