= Bloody Wednesday =

Bloody Wednesday can refer to:

- Bloody Wednesday (film), a 1988 film based on the San Ysidro McDonald's massacre
- Bloody Wednesday, the events of 15 August 1906 in the (Congress) Kingdom of Poland
- Operation Harvest Festival, murder of 43,000 Jews beginning on 3 November 1943
- The Colorado Avalanche–Detroit Red Wings brawl, an NHL fight between the Avalanche and the Red Wings

== See also ==
- Black Wednesday (disambiguation)
