= Justin MacCarthy =

19th century Irish Anglican Priest

Justin MacCarthy was an Anglican priest in Ireland in the second half of the 19th century.

MacCarthy was born in County Cork, educated at Trinity College, Dublin. and ordained in 1851. After curacies in Cullen and Cork, he was the incumbent at Castleventry from 1870. He was Archdeacon of Ross from 1870
