= Bloody Saturday =

Bloody Saturday may refer to:

- Bloody Saturday (1919), climax of the Winnipeg general strike
- Bloody Saturday (photograph), a photograph of a Chinese baby amid the ruins of Shanghai's South Station after Japanese bombing attacks in 1937
- Bloody Saturday (Shanghai), a mistaken attack on civilians by the Republic of China Air Force on 14 August 1937
- 1981 Brixton riot, an anti-police riot by black youths in London

== See also ==
- Black Saturday (disambiguation)
