= Beaune coach crash =

1982 traffic collision in France

Coordinates: 46.8622°N 4.8210°E

- Date: 31 July 1982
- Location: A6 motorway near Beaune, France
- Type: Multiple-vehicle collision.
- Cause: Driver error, defective brakes.
- Deaths: 53

The Beaune coach crash occurred on 31 July 1982 on the French A6 motorway near Beaune, in the Côte-d’Or département of east-central France. It is the second deadliest road traffic collision in France's history after the 2016 Nice truck attack. 53 people died, including 46 children (44 on the coach and 2 in a car). Most of the victims were on board a coach that caught fire as a result of the collision. The coach passengers were from Crépy-en-Valois in the Oise département of Picardy, northern France.

== The accident ==
At 8:00 pm on 30 July 1982, two coaches left Crépy-en-Valois, a town located approximately 60 kilometres (37 miles) north of Paris. They were carrying children and their teachers heading to a summer camp in Aussois in Savoie, in the French Alps. In the middle of the night, the two coaches were on the A6, heading towards Lyon.When they passed Beaune, it was raining and traffic was heavy on a day that is known as samedi noir ("black Saturday") in France, as many people leave for their summer holidays on this day.

At around 1:45 am, the general speed of traffic dropped due to the motorway becoming narrower, reducing from three lanes to two. Two cars, which were overtaking the two coaches at the point where the road narrowed, cut across behind one of the coaches and in front of the other. At the same time, the leading coach braked suddenly due to a slow-moving vehicle ahead. The second coach hit the back of the second car, causing a pile-up. The fuel tank of one of the cars was ripped open and emptied onto the road, and the petrol ignited. Six vehicles caught fire.

The first coach was evacuated by the drivers and teachers. In the second coach, a side exit was blocked by a crashed car. Nevertheless, two teachers managed to let around 15 children out through the back of the vehicle, but 44 remained trapped inside along with two drivers and two teachers and died. In the two cars that were travelling between the coaches, a total of five people, including two children, were killed (there were no survivors in these two cars).

== Victims ==
Families were informed of the accident at 6 am. The names of the children who had died were announced by the mayor of Crépy-en-Valois at around 11 am, in alphabetical order. Few of the bodies were identifiable.

The funerals took place in Crépy-en-Valois on 3 August 1982. French President François Mitterrand attended. The bodies that could not be identified were buried together under a large headstone in the cemetery in Crépy-en-Valois.

The insurance company had to pay out 12 million francs to the victims’ families.

== Investigation ==
Following a trial, the coach company’s contractor received a suspended 18-month prison sentence and a fine of 25,000 French francs. This was because the vehicle was found to have had seriously defective brakes. One of the drivers received a suspended 6-month prison sentence, his driving licence was suspended and he was fined 2,300 francs.

== Legislative consequences ==
The Minister of Transport at the time, Charles Fiterman, reacted by implementing strict measures, which remain in place today.

The maximum speed limit for coaches was reduced, while the speed limit for all vehicles in rainy conditions was reduced to 110 km/h (68 mph) on motorways and 80 km/h (50 mph) on other roads. Transporting groups of children is now forbidden during the busy weekends of late July and early August. All heavy vehicles (such as HGVs and coaches) must now be equipped with a mechanical speed-limitation device, and it is strictly forbidden for the user to tamper with or modify this device in any way.

Furthermore, manufacturers of vehicles destined for public transportation must use non-combustible and non-toxic materials and must make the windscreen out of laminated glass.

== Memorials ==
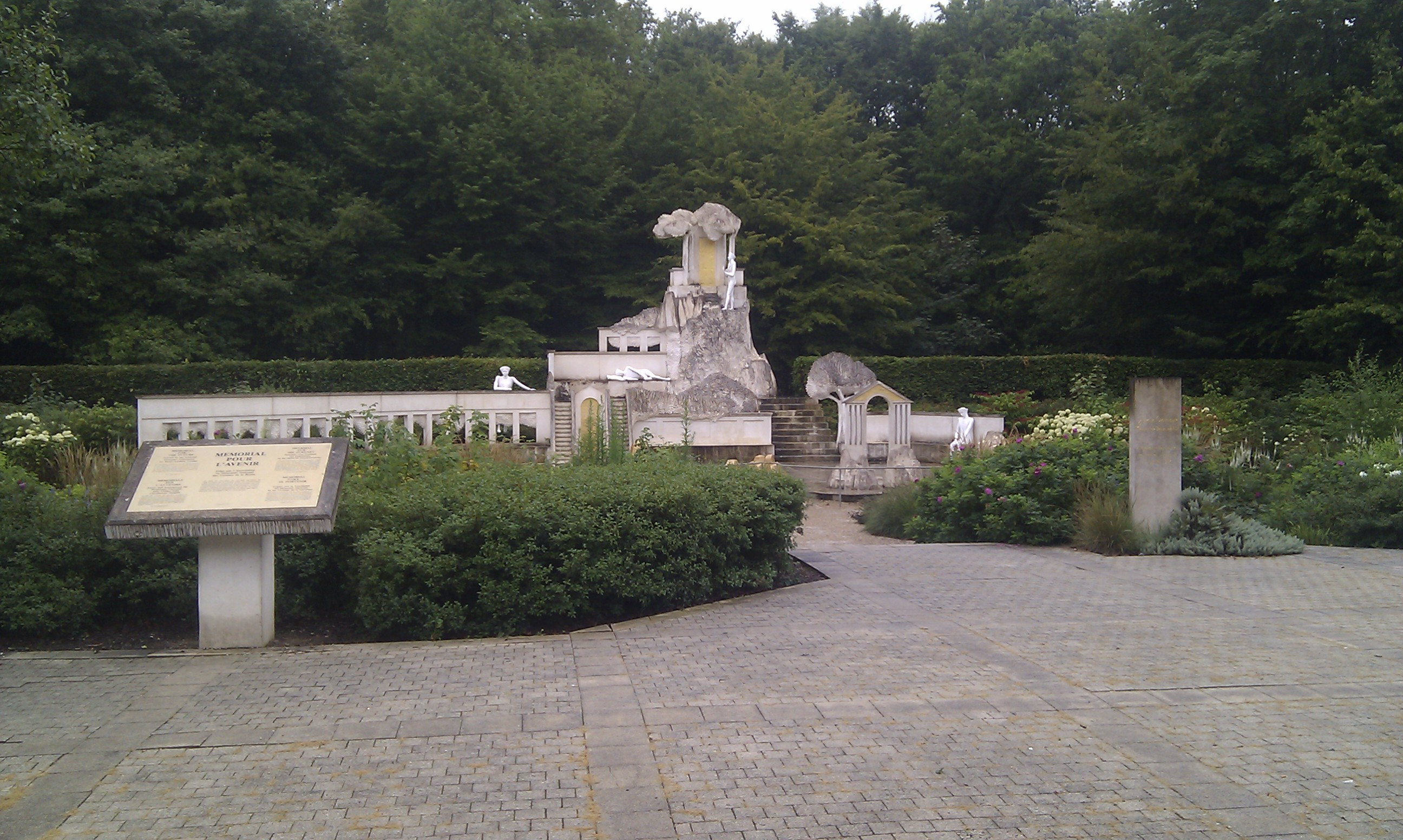
Memorial to the dead at the rest area at Curney, near Beaune

A memorial was erected in 1985 at a road-side rest area near Curney, in the commune of Merceuil, very close to the crash site. The child victims of the accident are buried in the cemetery in Crépy-en-Valois. The plaques feature their names, and some families lost several children.

Marie-Andrée Martin – who lost three children and had a fourth who was in the accident but survived – created the Association des victimes de Beaune (“Beaune Victims' Association”), which became a member of the Fédération nationale des victims d’accidents collectifs (“National Federation for Victims of Public-Transport Accidents”).

Each year since the accident, the town hall in Crépy-en-Valois has commemorated the tragedy on the anniversary date.

== See also ==
- Måbødalen bus accident
- Sierre coach crash
