= Bloody Monday (Danville) =

Series of arrests and attacks during a 1963 civil rights demonstration

Coordinates: 36.58659430°N 79.39215750°W

Bloody Monday is a name used to describe a series of arrests and attacks that took place during a civil rights protest held on June 10, 1963, in Danville, Virginia. It was held to protest segregation laws and racial inequality and was one of several protests held during the month of June. It attracted veteran protesters from out of town, such as Ivanhoe Donaldson, Avon Rollins, Robert Zellner and Dorthy Miller (Zellner) of the Student Nonviolent Coordinating Committee. The events received widespread criticism from national media, especially for the subsequent trials overseen by Judge Archibald M. Aiken.

During the day thirty-eight protesters were arrested and jailed for their participation in the protests. In response fifty protesters gathered at the city jail to hold a prayer vigil that evening. Participants at the vigil were attacked by the town's police and deputized citizens using billy clubs and water hoses. Sixty-five people were taken to the town's African-American hospital as a result of the events of that day. Forty-seven of the victims were people attending the prayer vigil. Martin Luther King Jr. visited Danville to support the demonstrators on July 11, 1963, but chose not to hold a march.

Judge Aiken began trying the arrested protesters on June 17. His handling of the cases of those arrested has received criticism from several people and organizations such as the United States Department of Justice. During the trials Aiken refused to give out bills of particulars or grant continuances or bail, and announced guilty verdicts from a pre-typed script after a five-minute proceeding for each defendant.

Judge Aiken's refusal to stay the sentences and allow appeal forced the civil rights movement into a difficult legal path. This and the prohibition on demonstrating weakened their unity while unifying the white power structure around a legal strategy to suppress dissent. With the petering down of demonstrations the "Danville method" became a model for white resistance to desegregation.

== See also ==
- Bloody Tuesday (1964)
