= Bloody Thursday =

Bloody Thursday, Thursday Massacre or Thursday Night Massacre may refer to:

- "Bloody Thursday", on March 28, 1918, during the Battle of Tampere
- "Bloody Thursday" on July 5, 1934, during the 1934 West Coast waterfront strike in the United States
- "Bloody Thursday", on February 17, 2011, during the fourth day of the Bahraini uprising
- The Chiquola Mill Massacre, on September 6, 1934, during the 1934 textile workers' strike in the eastern United States
- Escalante massacre, Filippines
- The Kossuth Tér Massacre, on October 25, 1956, during the Hungarian Revolution
- 28–29 April events (Turkey)
- "Bloody Thursday" during the 1969 People's Park protest, on May 15, 1969, Berkeley, California
- The 2017 storming of the Macedonian Parliament, on April 27, 2017, was dubbed "Bloody Thursday".
- "Thursday Night Massacre", a name for the December 2022 Twitter suspensions
- "Thursday Afternoon Massacre", a name used for the resignations of federal prosecutors in response to the quid pro quo deal between the Trump administration and New York City mayor Eric Adams

== See also ==
- Black Thursday (disambiguation)
