= Bloody Sunday (1968) =

Soviet attack on civilians during Warsaw Pact invasion of Czechoslovakia

- Part of Warsaw Pact invasion of Czechoslovakia
- Location: 49°28′21″N 17°06′24″E; Prostějov, Czechoslovakia
- Date: 25 August 1968; 58 years ago 20:02
- Attack type: Mass shooting
- Deaths: 3
- Injuries: 9
- Perpetrator: Soviet Armed Forces

Bloody Sunday was a massacre on 25 August 1968 when Soviet soldiers shot three unarmed civilians in Prostějov during the Warsaw Pact invasion of Czechoslovakia. Nine others were injured.

== Events ==
On 20 August, 1968, the armies of five states of the Warsaw Pact invaded Czechoslovakia starting occupation of the country. On 25 August, 1968, at 20:00 PM, a large column of the Soviet army was passing from Olomouc to Brno through Prostějov. Soldiers got strayed in the streets of Prostějov as Czechoslovaks were modifying or removing traffic markings to disorient Soviets. Soviets passed through the centre of town but, due to missing signs, they turned the wrong way and circled around the city returning back on the access road from Olomouc. Soviet soldiers started to become nervous due to being disoriented. Near the Prostějov Municipal Cemetery soldiers started shooting around, even though streets were full of people. Shooting resulted in blown-out shop windows, damaged facades of houses and the deaths of three people.

== Aftermath ==
The funeral services for the three people killed occurred on 29 August, 1968. Thousands of people gathered in the center of the city for the funeral. Some were holding banners demanding the departure of the occupiers and condemnation of the shooting. The massacre was never investigated and Soviets called story of massacre a fabrication. It is unknown what caused the massacre. The people who were shooting were never found.
