= Black Friday (Patterson novel) =

Book by James Patterson

- First edition
- Author: James Patterson
- Original title: Black Market
- Language: English
- Publisher: Simon & Schuster (initial publication), Warner Books
- Publication date: June 1986 (Black Market), April 1, 2000 (Black Friday)
- Publication place: United States
- Media type: Print, ebook
- Pages: 365 pages (BM hardback), 450 pages (BF paperback)
- ISBN: 0446609323

Black Friday (originally published in 1986 as Black Market) is an American thriller novel by James Patterson. The book was initially published in 1986 through Simon & Schuster and Patterson released a slightly re-written version of the novel in 2000 through Warner Books.

The 2000 edition, Black Friday, was a New York Times Bestseller for paperback fiction.

== Synopsis ==
The book follows lawyer Caitlin Dillon and Federal Agent Archer Carroll as they must find a way to overcome a threat against Wall Street. A secret militia group has threatened to destroy Wall Street by way of several explosions, but give no demands and will not negotiate.

== Reception ==
Initial critical reception for the book in 1986 was mixed, with Kirkus Reviews panning the novel while the Business Review called it "predictable but intriguing". The Atlanta Journal praised the novel, calling it a "tense, gripping thriller".

Publishers Weekly reviewed the 2000 edition and gave a mixed review.
