= 1921 Bolzano Bloody Sunday =

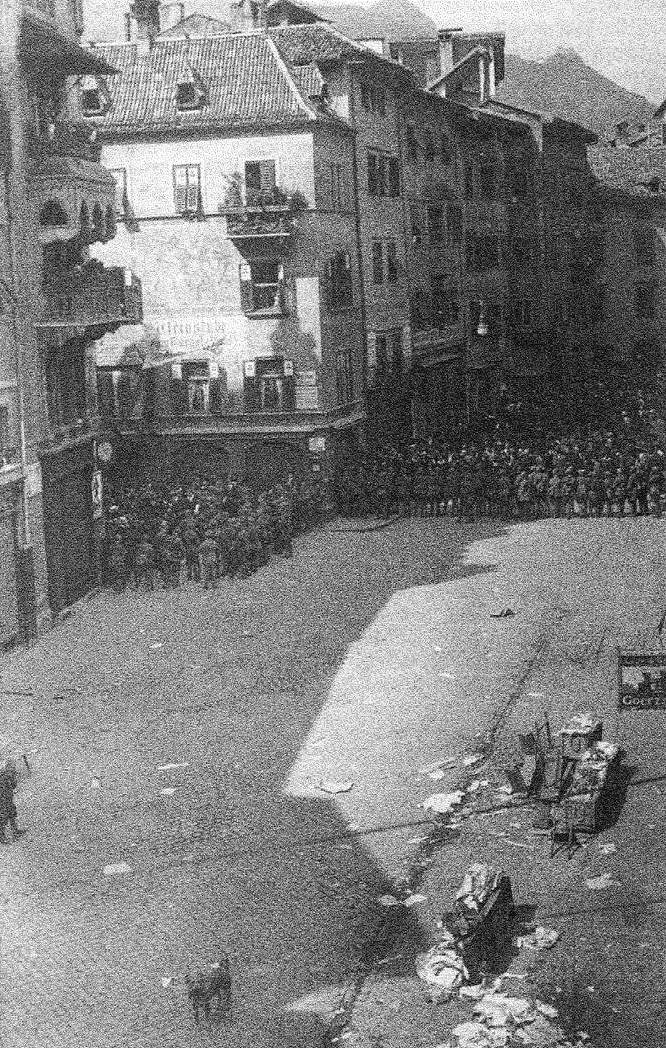
Italian military blocking the Bozen Obstmarkt after the fascist raid on 24 April 1921

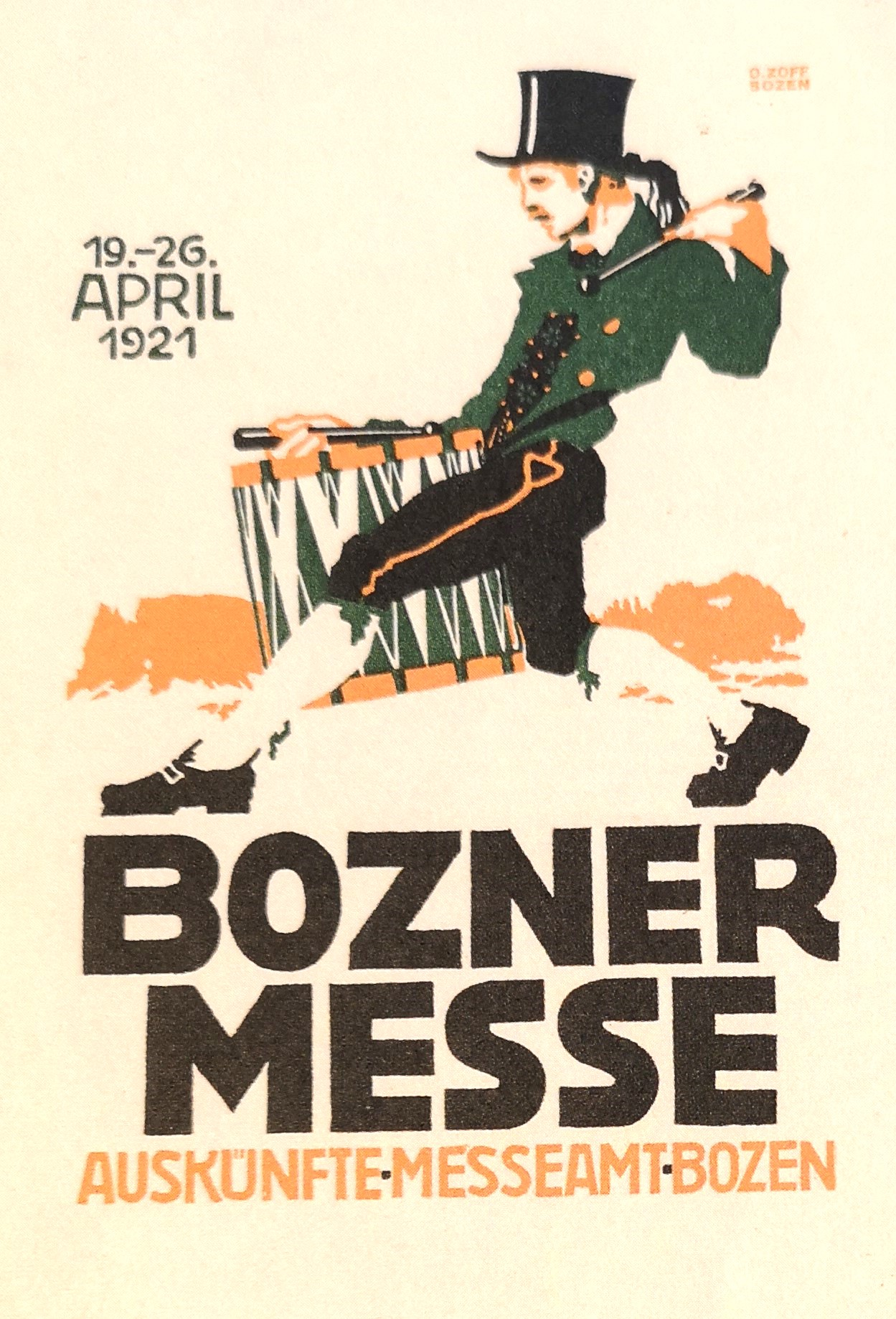
Poster for the 1921 Bozen Spring Fair

Bozner Blutsonntag (German for Bozen Bloody Sunday) refers to the events of 24 April 1921 in Bozen (Italian Bolzano). It was the first climax of fascist violence in South Tyrol, a German-speaking province that was annexed by Italy after World War I.

== Events ==
On 24 April 1921, a referendum was held in the part of Tyrol still belonging to Austria regarding the Anschluss to the German Reich. The fascists, who at that time were a paramilitary group involved in thuggery throughout Italy, considered the coincidental opening of the Bozen Spring Fair on the same day as a provocation connected with the plebiscite. They decided to disrupt the traditional costume procession (Trachtenumzug) through Bozen. Despite warnings, the Italian authorities did not take any security measures to protect the local populace.

In the morning of 24 April 1921, about 290 fascists from the rest of Italy arrived at the Bozen railway station and united with about 120 supporters of the fascist movement from Bozen. During the traditional costume procession, the fascists attacked the participants and spectators with clubs, pistols and hand grenades. About 50 South Tyroleans were injured, some severely. Franz Innerhofer, a teacher from Marling, was shot to death, while trying to protect a boy.

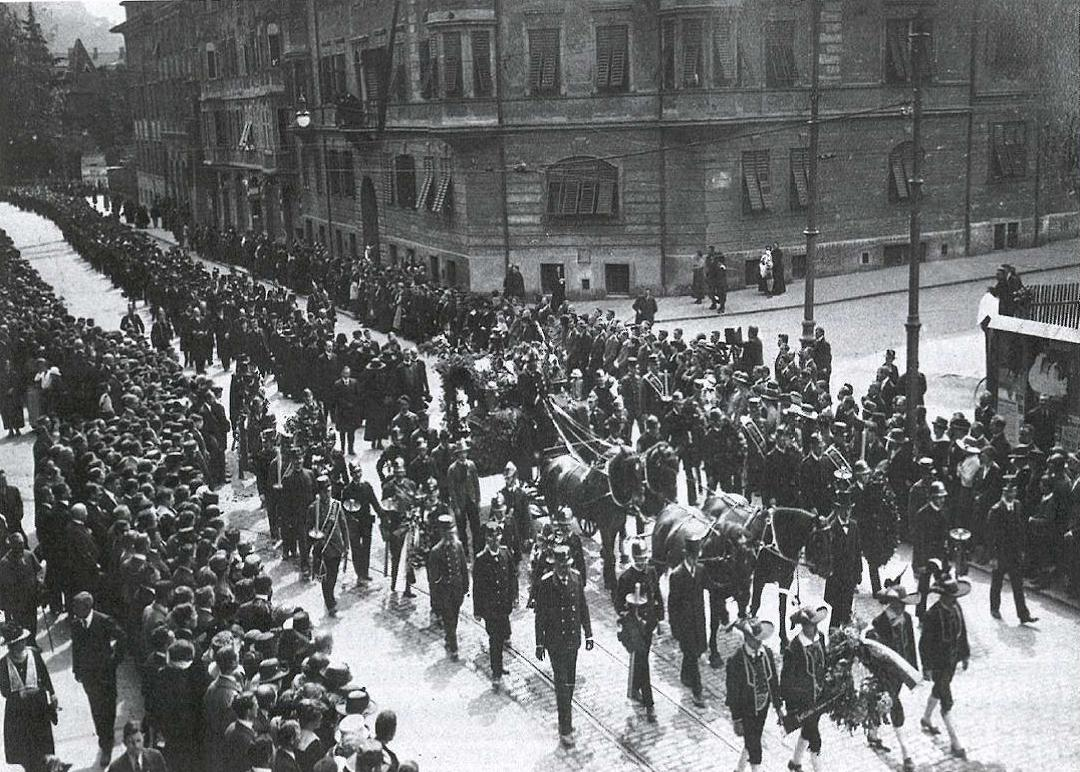
Funeral procession of Franz Innerhofer in Bozen 1921

The Italian military intervened only to escort the aggressors to the railway station, where they were able to leave unharmed. The request by the Italian Prime Minister Giovanni Giolitti to immediately arrest the perpetrators and bring them to justice resulted in the arrest of two Bozen fascists. Benito Mussolini threatened to force the liberation of his comrades with 2000 fascists on 1 May 1921 in Bozen, but the two were then released.

== Legacy ==
A commemorative plaque commemorates the events at Ansitz Stillendorf (where Innerhofer was shot). On 25 April 2011, the Italian national holiday to the liberation from fascism and national socialism, a square in the historical center of Bozen was named in the honor of Franz Innerhofer (immediately south of the Free University of Bozen-Bolzano).
