= Black Friday (single album) =

Single by Gwar
- Released: November 25, 2016
- Recorded: 2013, 2014
- Genre: Thrash metal, punk rock
- Length: 10:14
- Label: Metal Blade

Gwar singles chronology
"Isn't This Disgusting?" (2011)	"Black Friday" (2016)

Black Friday is a single by thrash metal band Gwar, that was issued on picture disc for Record Store Day Black Friday 2016. It is the first studio material released by the band since founding member and lead singer Dave Brockie died of a heroin overdose on March 23, 2014.

== Contents ==
Side A (dubbed "Side Oderus") contains the band's final studio recording with Brockie, and side B (dubbed "Side Blothar") contains the band's first studio recording with new lead singer Michael Bishop as his new character Blothar the Berserker. Side B features the only appearance of the character Vulvatron Destructo, portrayed by singer and seamstress Kim Dylla, due to her dismissal from the band in early 2015.

The single consists of re-recorded cover songs that were initially released through The A.V. Club's annual A.V. Undercover series. The lyrics of the Jim Carroll Band's "People Who Died" were rewritten to include the names of friends of the band who had died. Each verse is sung by a different member of the band.

The rewritten lyrics honor actor and comedian Robin Williams, Peter Steele of Type O Negative, Jeff Hanneman of Slayer, Jackass member Ryan Dunn, local friend David Castleman, former Death Piggy drummer Sean Sumner, Pantera and Damageplan guitarist Dimebag Darrell, Ministry and Rigor Mortis guitarist Mike Scaccia, freak show performer Crazy White Sean, and former Gwar members Cory Smoot and Dave Brockie.

== Track listing ==
Side Oderus
No.	Title	Writer(s)	Length
1.	"Get Outta My Dreams, Get Into My Car" / "Baba O'Riley"	Billy Ocean, Robert John "Mutt" Lange, Pete Townshend	5:35

Side Blothar
No.	Title	Writer(s)	Length
1.	"West End Girls" / "People Who Died"	Neil Tennant, Chris Lowe, Jim Carroll, Brian Linsley, Stephen Linsley, Terrell Winn, Wayne Woods, Gwar	4:39
Total length:			10:14

== Personnel ==
Side Oderus:

- Dave Brockie (Oderus Urungus) – lead vocals
- Brent Purgason (Pustulus Maximus) – lead guitar, backing vocals
- Michael Derks (Balsac the Jaws of Death) – rhythm guitar
- Jamison Land (Beefcake the Mighty) – bass, backing vocals
- Brad Roberts (Jizmak Da Gusha) – drums

Side Blothar:

- Michael Bishop (Blothar the Berserker) – lead vocals
- Kim Dylla (Vulvatron Destructo) – female vocals
- Brent Purgason (Pustulus Maximus) – lead guitar, backing vocals
- Michael Derks (Balsac the Jaws of Death) – rhythm guitar, backing vocals
- Jamison Land (Beefcake the Mighty) – bass, backing vocals
- Brad Roberts (Jizmak Da Gusha) – drums
