= Black Friday (bombing campaign) =

2014 four day bombing campaign by Israel in Rafah, Gaza Strip

Black Friday refers to a series of military strikes that took place in Rafah, a city in the southern Gaza Strip, over a period of four days starting on 1 August 2014. The events are notable for their intensity and the high number of casualties, particularly within the context of the larger conflict known as the 2014 Israel–Gaza conflict or Operation Protective Edge.

== Background ==
The 2014 Israel–Gaza conflict began on 8 July 2014 and escalated to significant military engagements, including aerial, naval, and ground operations by Israel, and rocket fire by Hamas and other militant groups. During the military operation known as Cast Lead, approximately 350 children lost their lives, and about 6,000 residential structures were demolished. During Protective Edge, the number of child fatalities rose to roughly 550, with destruction expanding to 18,000 homes. The aftermath of Cast Lead left approximately 600,000 tons of debris, while Protective Edge resulted in a significantly higher amount of debris, estimated at 2.5 million tons. Furthermore, the impact of Protective Edge was particularly devastating on the economic front, exacerbating already dire socioeconomic conditions that had not been at such a low point since 1967.

== Prelude to the attack ==
On 1 August 2014, a temporary ceasefire had been brokered by the United Nations and the United States, which was intended to last for 72 hours to allow humanitarian aid and relief to the residents of Gaza. However, the ceasefire collapsed within a few hours. Both Israel and Hamas accused each other of violating the ceasefire terms.

== The attack on Rafah ==
The four-day bombing in Rafah commenced on 1 August, immediately after the breakdown of the ceasefire. The Israel Defense Forces (IDF) launched a series of airstrikes and artillery shelling targeting what they claimed were Hamas militants and infrastructure. More than 2,000 bombs, missiles and artillery shells were fired on Rafah on the first day of the attack. By the end of the four day assault, over 200 people had been killed and over 2,600 homes destroyed or damaged. Amnesty International described the bombing campaign as an indiscriminate attack hitting cars, ambulances, motorbikes and civilians attempting to flee the attack. According to Palestinian medical sources, 135 civilians were killed in the attackes including 75 children.

The motivation for the operation is widely seen to be a response to the suspected capture of an Israeli soldier, Hadar Goldin, which triggered the implementation of the so-called Hannibal Directive, encompassing intensive military efforts to foil the capture. He was declared dead on the second day of bombing. After he was declared dead the bombing continued.

Breaking the Silence reported an Intelligence Corps soldier quoting senior army officers, saying:

2,000 dead and 11,000 wounded, half a million refugees, decades' worth of destruction. Harm to lots of senior Hamas members and to their homes, to their families. These were stated as accomplishments so that no one would doubt that what we did during this period was meaningful.

== Reactions ==
Amnesty International and Forensic Architecture published a report titled "'Black Friday', Carnage in Rafah during 2014 Israel/Gaza conflict" detailing allegations of human rights violations. The report described the attack as a disproportionate and indiscriminate attack in which the Israeli military failed to take sufficient precautions to avoid civilian casualties. In two of 15 individual cases, Amnesty International determined that the Israeli military directly targeted civilians. One of the cases describes drone missile attacks wounding civilians, including children. The ambulance carrying the wounded was then also targeted with drone missiles incinerating eight people, including the three children, two medics, and a volunteer. A second ambulance arriving to the scene was also targeted by drone missiles.

The United Nations Fact Finding Mission on the 2014 Israel–Gaza conflict said the attack may have been a war crime, writing that it both "appears to have violated the prohibition of indiscriminate attacks" and "raises concerns with regard to the IDF's respect of the principle of proportionality."

The Palestinian Center for Human Rights called the attacks a "massacre" and called on the International Criminal Court to "guarantee that civilians will be secured in any coming confrontation in Gaza."

Finkelstein describes the attack on Rafah as a "a terror assault on a defenseless population", citing testimony from soldiers and evidence presented in Amnesty International's report.

== See also ==
- Israeli–Palestinian conflict
- Operation Protective Edge
- Gaza War (2008–2009)
- Gaza War (2012)
- List of wars involving Israel
- List of wars involving the State of Palestine
