= Black Tuesday (disambiguation) =

Black Tuesday (October 29, 1929) was the highest trading volume day of the Wall Street crash of 1929 on the New York Stock Exchange.

Black Tuesday may also refer to:

- Tuesday, 29 May 1453, on which Constantinople fell to the Ottoman Empire
- Black Tuesday (film), a 1954 film starring Edward G. Robinson
- Black Tuesday (1912), on which a union conflict in New Zealand led to the death of Fred Evans
- Tuesday October 29, 1929, associated with the Wall Street crash of 1929
- Black Tuesday (1931), on which the Estevan Riot took place in Estevan, Saskatchewan
- Black Tuesday (1965), a pivotal political event in The Bahamas
- Black Tuesday (1967), a day of devastating bushfires in the Australian state of Tasmania
- Black Monday (1987) or Black Tuesday (due to time-zone differences), the largest one-day percentage decline in recorded stock market history
- Tuesday, 18 July 1995, during which the funeral of Patriarch Volodymyr of Kyiv turned into a riot between supporters of the Ukrainian Orthodox Church – Kyiv Patriarchate and supporters of the Ukrainian Orthodox Church (Moscow Patriarchate)
- Tuesday, September 11, 2001, the day of the September 11 attacks on the World Trade Center in New York City, the Pentagon in Arlington, Virginia, and a field in Shanksville, Pennsylvania
- Black Tuesday (2005), the day of a devastating bushfire on the Eyre Peninsula in South Australia
- Black Tuesday, an Imperial Stout brewed by The Bruery

== See also ==
- Bloody Tuesday (disambiguation)
- Blackout Tuesday
