= Black Wednesday (disambiguation) =

Black Wednesday was a British financial crisis on 16 September 1992.

Black Wednesday may also refer to:

- Other one-time events:
  - 9 January 1878: Black Wednesday 1878, a political crisis in Victoria, Australia
  - September 15, 1954: Black Wednesday 1954, a 1954 air traffic control crisis caused by severe weather in the East Coast of the United States
  - September 27, 1968: Black Wednesday 1968, a day of despair in the 1967 Chicago White Sox season
  - April 3, 1974: Black Wednesday 1974 – 1974 Super Outbreak, the most violent tornado outbreak on record with 30 out of 148 tornadoes being of F4-F5 intensity, with 7 F5 tornadoes recorded
  - February 25, 1981: Black Wednesday 1981, when Michael Scott fired forty employees at Apple Computer
  - 26 March 1986: Black Wednesday 1986, the day when Swindon Works closed after 143 years of operation
  - 25 May 2005: Black Wednesday 2005, a day of mass sexual assault in Egypt
  - April 27, 2011: Black Wednesday 2011 – 2011 Super Outbreak, the most prolific day with tornadoes in recorded history, which saw 216 tornadoes with 15 violent tornadoes and 4 EF5 tornadoes
  - 26 June 2013: Black Wednesday 2013, the first Wednesday of the 2013 Wimbledon Championships in which a number of former world number ones got knocked out in the second round of the tournament
  - 8 April 2026: Black Wednesday 2026, Israeli attacks in Lebanon which killed more than 300 people
- Black Wednesday (comic), a 1959 Disney comic by Carl Barks
- Black Wednesday (NHS), the first Wednesday of August when newly qualified doctors start and resident doctors rotate in the UK's National Health Service

== See also ==
- Bloody Wednesday (disambiguation)
