= Black Friday (2005) =

Black Friday was a massacre on 30 September 2005 in the towns of Tura and Williamnagar, in Meghalaya, India when police shot and killed 9 protesters during a protest against the state government's decision to transfer the education board from Tura to the state capital, Shillong. They were the single largest acts of violence in those towns since the Indian Independence Movement. The day became known locally as "Black Friday".

The decision of the state government to move the education board was extremely unpopular in the west of Meghalaya because the area is predominantly made up of members of the Garo tribe, whereas the east of the state (including Shillong) is mostly inhabited by members of the Khasi tribe. Protesters complained that the transfer meant that the west of Meghalaya would be bereft departments, given all were transferred east.
