= Black Thursday =

Black Thursday is a term used to refer to typically negative, notable events that have occurred on a Thursday. It has been used in the following cases:

- 6 February 1851, a devastating day of bushfires in Victoria, Australia
- 21 June 1877, an execution of 10 suspected leaders of the "Molly Maguires"
- 8 November 1901 (21 November in the Gregorian calendar), the climax of the gospel riots in Athens.
- 24 October 1929, start of the Wall Street crash of 1929.
- 14 October 1943, when the USAAF suffered large losses during bombing in the second Schweinfurt raid during World War II
- 12 April 1951, during the Korean War, when 25% of the Far East Air Force B-29 bombing force were damaged or destroyed by Soviet MiG-15s in MiG Alley.
- 21 November 1968, day of protests by students at University of Wisconsin-Oshkosh
- 12 April 1973, clashes between the police and right-wing demonstrators in Milan resulted in the killing of policeman Antonio Marino.
- 30 May 1975, the massacre of about 50 Lebanese Christians in the area of Bashoura in West Beirut.
- 22 January 1987, the Mendiola massacre, which claimed the lives of 13 protesters in Manila, Philippines
- 3 September 1987, known as the "Black Thursday of Warsaw Transit", when 15 people died in two separate rail accidents in Warsaw, Poland
- 24 July 2003, when former Guatemalan president Efraín Ríos Montt's supporters rioted in protest of a court decision barring him from standing in the 2003 general election
- 30 September 2009, when the Irish government revealed to its people the alleged full cost of bailing out Anglo-Irish Bank
- 15 November 2018, the Franco-Ontarian jeudi noir when the government of Ontario announced the elimination of several Franco-Ontarian institutions
- 12 March 2020, Black Thursday stock market crash
- A massacre during the 2022 Chadian protests
- "Black Thursday", the week day preceding Black Friday
- A nationwide general strike in the 2026 French civil unrest on 5 November 2026.

== See also ==
- Black Monday
- Black Tuesday
- Black Wednesday
- Black Friday
- Black Saturday
- Black Sunday
- Bloody Thursday (disambiguation)
