= Akelarre (disambiguation) =

Akelarre is a Basque term meaning Witches' Sabbath.

Akelarre may also refer to:

- Akelarre (Criminal album), 2011
- Akelarre (Lola Índigo album), 2019
- Akelarre (cipher), a block cipher
- Akelarre (film), a 1984 Spanish film by Pedro Olea
- Akelarre (restaurant), a Basque restaurant that has achieved three Michelin stars
- Akelarre, a 2020 Spanish drama film also known as Coven
- Aquelarre (band), a former Argentinian rock group
- El aquelarre, an oil mural by Francisco Goya also known as Witches' Sabbath (The Great He-Goat)
- Aquelarre (role-playing game), a medieval demoniacal fantasy role-playing game
- Aquelarre (TV series), a Chilean television drama series

== See also ==
- Witches' Sabbath (disambiguation)
