= The Malefice =

Studio album by Pentagram Chile
- Released: September 6, 2013
- Genre: Death metal, thrash metal
- Length: 51:55
- Label: Cyclone Empire

Pentagram Chile chronology
Imperial Anthem (2013)	The Malefice (2013)

The Malefice is the debut full-length studio album by Chilean extreme metal band Pentagram Chile. It is their first full-length album released in over 28 years after their formation. The album was released on September 6, 2013. Vice described it as having a "beautifully meaty modern production job, but it pulses with feral old-school energy, giving off a possessed sense of conviction".

The limited edition digipak includes a bonus album with re-recorded demos.

== Track listing ==
No.	Title	Length
1.	"The Death of Satan"	5:22
2.	"La Fiura"	4:28
3.	"The Apparition"	6:03
4.	"Horror Vacui"	4:08
5.	"Spontaneous Combustion"	5:02
6.	"Grand Design"	5:41
7.	"Sacrophobia"	4:56
8.	"Arachnoids"	4:22
9.	"King Pest"	6:13
10.	"Prophetic Tremors"	5:40
Total length:		51:55

Digipak bonus tracks
No.	Title	Length
11.	"Fatal Predictions"	5:27
12.	"The Malefice"	4:23
13.	"Demoniac Possession"	4:11
14.	"Demented"	5:58
15.	"Profaner"	6:11
16.	"Temple of Perdition"	6:30
17.	"Spell of the Pentagram"	6:36
Total length:		91:11

== Personnel ==
- Anton Reisenegger – vocals, guitar
- Juan Pablo "Azazel" Uribe – guitar
- Dan Biggin – bass
- Juan Pablo Donoso – drums
