= Pentagram (Pentagram album) =

Compilation album by Pentagram
- Released: January–November 2000
- Genres: Thrash metal, death metal
- Length: 42:39
- Labels: Independiente: 2000 Picoroco Records; 2002 From Beyond Productions

Pentagram chronology
White Hell (1991)	Pentagram (2000)	Pentagram Reborn (2001)

Pentagram is the first compilation album of the Chilean metal band Pentagram, independently released in Chile in 2000 and, two years later, in The Netherlands as a limited edition LP of 500 copies on vinyl. It was the first album by the group after their last demo, White Hell in 1991, and consists of songs recorded live and in the studio in 1987.

In April 2008, the Chilean edition of Rolling Stone ranked the album as the 47th best album of all time in Chile.

== Track listing ==
=== CD version ===
Pentagram
No.	Title	Length
1.	"Fatal Prediction"	5:06
2.	"Demoniac Possession"	4:09
3.	"Spell of the Pentagram"	6:20
4.	"The Malefice"	4:18
5.	"Profaner"	6:02
6.	"Temple of Perdition"	6:19

Bonus track
No.	Title	Length
7.	"Demoniac Possession (Live)"	4:11
8.	"Profaner (Live)"	6:02

- Tracks 1–3 previously released on Demo I and recorded in January 1987, Nacofon Studio, Santiago, Chile.
- 4 to 6 songs previously released in Demo II and recorded in 1987 in Eym September Studios, Santiago, Chile.
- Tracks 7–8 recorded live on 7 November 1987, at Manuel Plaza, Santiago, Chile.

=== LP version ===
Side A
No.	Title	Length
1.	"Fatal Prediction"	5:06
2.	"Demoniac Possession"	4:09
3.	"Spell of the Pentagram"	6:20
4.	"Demoniac Possession (Live)"	4:11

Side B
No.	Title	Length
1.	"The Malefice"	4:18
2.	"Profaner"	6:02
3.	"Temple of Perdition"	6:19
4.	"Profaner (Live)"	6:02

== Credits ==
Pentagram

- Bass guitar – Alfredo Peña, Anton Reisenegger (tracks 1–3)
- Drums – Eduardo Topelberg
- Rhythm guitar – Juan Pablo Uribe
- Vocals, lead guitar – Anton Reisenegger

Other

- Design – Fernando Mujica
- Engineer – Alvaro Leon (tracks 1–6)
- Remastering (digital edition) – Cristian Rodríguez
