= Marcel René von Herrfeldt =

German painter (1889–1965)

Marcel René von Herrfeldt (September 1889, in Boulogne-Billancourt – 1965, in Munich) was a German painter and protagonist of the Munich School. Initially adhering to the movement of Art Nouveau sans phrase, Herrfeldt later integrates elements of New Objectivity. Fusing Art Nouveau and elements of New Objectivity, he develops a style referred to as expressive realism in respective literature.

== Biography ==
Marcel René von Herrfeldt was born in 1889, in Paris of the Fin de Siècle. His parents, Alice Herrfeldt and Luis Ricardo Falero, are both artists and engaged to the bustling art scene of Paris and Europe. Since a very young age, painting is a preoccupation of Herrfeldt. He mainly studies in Munich, guided by Franz von Stuck, Florence and Paris, with an interruption during the First World War. Herrfeldt's paintings are strongly influenced by his teacher Franz von Stuck; in an early phase, he is both influenced by motives and genre, later on, he develops a more individual style, integrating realistic, expressionist elements. The motives Herrfeldt does not only share with other protagonists of the Munich School, but with his father as well. The focus on nude paintings and especially women portrayals is relatively widespread in that art scene.

Although Herrfeldt's biography is not entirely reconstructed, there is an uncontested hallmark in his early career: 1921 he exhibitions his interpretation of the subjection of woman/woman slavery at Glaspalast, at an annual exhibition organized by protagonists of the Munich School, well renowned by that time. His painting is then widely discussed and his work is accessible to a greater audience. This standing is limited to the inter-war period, fostered by the disbandment of the Munich School. Herrfeldt reassesses in 1951, without tying on to his success of the inter-war period. Awarded the Diplôme d`honneur in 1971, Herrfeldts Oeuvre is priced posthum.

The classification of Herrfeldt to a specific genre ist difficult, wrote Max Drost in his analysis on Herrfeldt's work in 1925. Experts primarily differentiate between an early MRH phase of pure Art Nouveau and a later phase of an Expressionist Realistic turn. By contrast, there is continuity regarding his motives of astrology and mythology.

== Oeuvre ==
=== Inspiration ===
Regarding motives, several influences can be highlighted. One of the most important: His father Luis Ricardo Falero (Im. 2) – a Spanish painter and engineer – who is as well focused on nude-painting, astrology and mythology. The focus on women portrayals and mythological motives Herrfeldt shared with his contemporaries and relative art movements such as the Vienna Secession, with well renowned representatives such as Gustav Klimt and Egon Schiele.

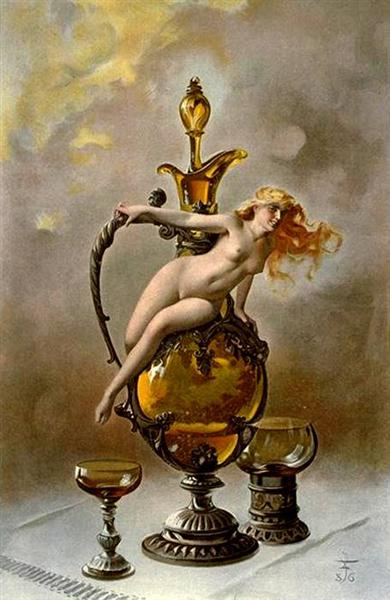
Im.1 Wine of Tokai, Falero

=== Principal work and Motives ===
Exploring the treasure-chest of antique mythology, his preoccupation with nude painting and women portrayals are accompanied with Max Drost's dictum that Herrfeldt is the herald of women's beauty.

His affinity to antique Mythology is pivotal and explicit in his masterpiece Poseidon, completed in 1960, a phase Herrfeldt himself refers to as his peak. Herrfeldt only dates this piece of art. Herrfeldt's masterpiece is created by a time when the Age of Aquarius is of special interest. Moreover, Herrfeldt not only portrays women, but men as well. His interpretation of Narciss is a typical example. The interpretations of Salome, Judith and the slave women, the latter catching huge attention when exhibited in 1921 in the Glaspalast, are key paintings as well. Further topics are his extensive studies of water, music and dancing scenes. The portrayals of women and focus on power relations and subjection runs like a golden thread through his creations. These portrayals are expressive, idealized and provocative, especially in the context of the 1920s.

== Impact ==
Despite his absence in current debates, Herrfeldt can be related to modern Pinup culture. In addition, the tension of erotic, idealized portrayals and emancipation is not a controversy limited to his epoch, but steadily reappears and recently becomes manifest in the context of the Femen Movement.

== Sources ==
=== Further reading ===
- Bruckmanns Lexikon der Münchner Kunst (1993): Münchner Maler im 19./20. Jahrhundert, 6 Bde., Stuttgart: Bruckmann.
- Drost, Max (1925): «Marcel René von Herrfeldt. Ein Verkünder der Schönheit», in: Die Schönheit, 8 (1925), Dresden: Verlag der Schönheit, S. 358–369.
- Johann, Karl (1929): «Herrfeldt Marcel», in: Aus den Künstler-Ateliers des 26.6. und 7. Bezirkes, München: Selbstverlag des Autors, S. 53, 52, 143.
- Ludwig, Horst (1989):«Im Fahrwasser der Sezession», in: Franz von Stuck und seine Schüler, München: Dr. C. Wolf und Sohn KG, S. 210–239.
- Neue Pinakothek München (1999), Bestandes Katalog, Bayerische Staatsgemäldesammlungen, München.
- Ova. (1982): «Erotik pur», in: Iui, 7 (1982), München: NewMag New Magazines Verlagsgesellschaft, S. 60–72.
- Zeller, Klaus Robert (2000): Marcel René von Herrfeldt. Die Sammlung MRH, Zürich, www.artocratia.ch

=== Film ===
- Kayser, Stephan (1980): Magma – Eine Reise von hier nach dort
- Kayser, Stephan (1978): Marcel von Herrfeldt – Künder der Frauenschönheit

=== Images ===
- Im. 1 Wine of Tokai, Luis Ricardo Falero
