= Anton Reisenegger =

Chilean guitarist and vocalist

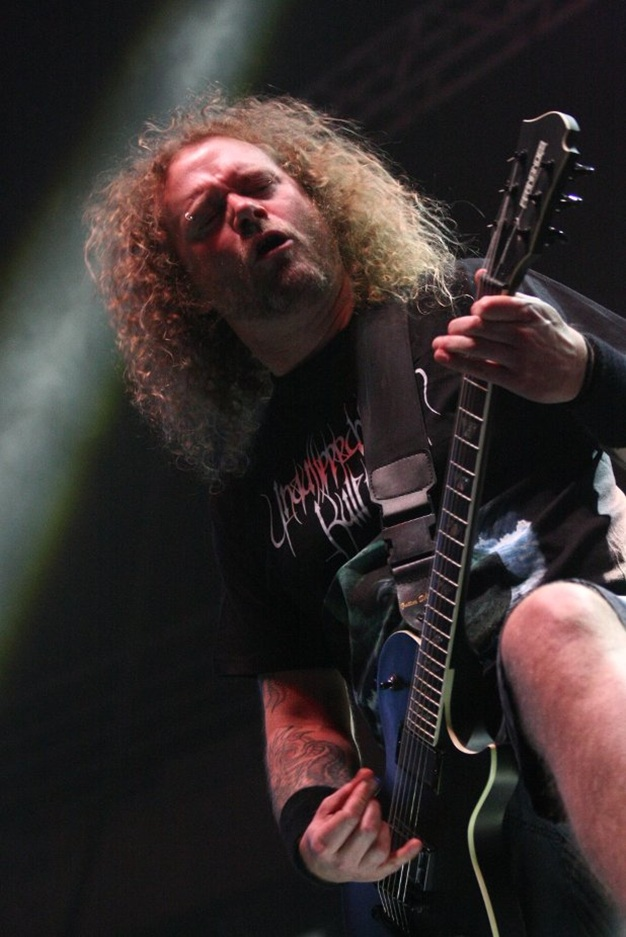
- Reisenegger in 2015

Background information
- Also known as: "Behemoth"
- Born: Georg Anton Reisenegger von Oepen; 21 January 1969 (age 57); Santiago, Chile
- Genres: Thrash metal, death metal, grindcore, heavy metal, extreme metal
- Occupation: Musician
- Instruments: Guitar, vocals
- Years active: 1985–present

Anton Reisenegger von Oepen (born 21 January 1969) is a Chilean musician who is the guitarist and vocalist of the thrash/death metal band Criminal as well as guitarist and vocalist of death metal band Pentagram Chile. He is also the host of the extreme metal radio show Disco Duro on Radio Futuro.

== Career ==
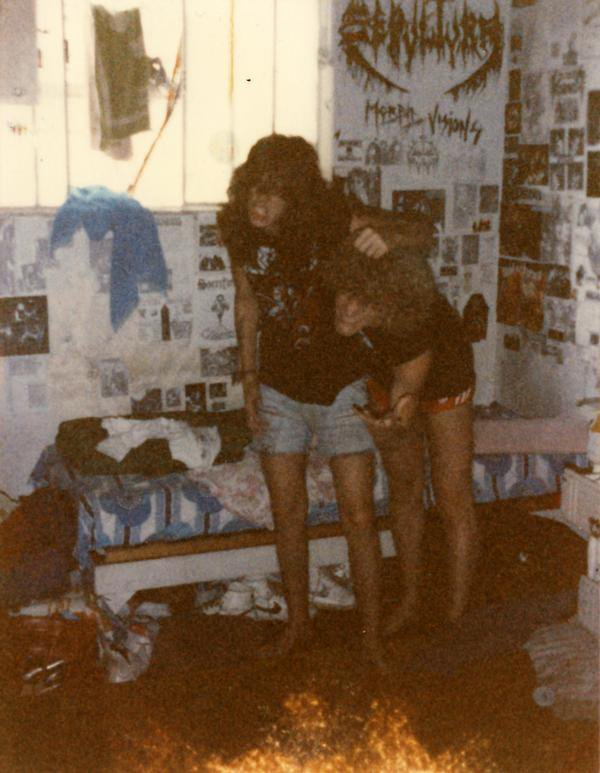
Max Cavalera (left) and Anton Reisenegger

=== Pentagram (1985–1992, 2007–present) ===
On 28 December 1985, Reisenegger formed Pentagram with Juan Pablo Uribe (guitar), and Eduardo Topelberg (drums). By 1987, the band had recorded a demo (Demo I) in which Reisenegger also played bass guitar. Due to limited media coverage of the genre at the time, recognition was achieved by word of mouth and through fans distributing tape recordings. This marketing method made Demo I popular within the Chilean extreme metal underground scene.

In September 1987, Reisenegger recruited bassist Alfredo 'El Bey' Peña and released a second demo tape, named Demo II, which was well received. Increased popularity gained from tape distribution allowed the band able to record a single in Switzerland, through the Chainsaw Murder Records label.

Pentagram was not able to attain the level of recognition to catch the interest of national and international record labels, leading to a drop in motivation and music quality, and ultimately, their split. Pentagram played their last concert before separating in 1988 at the Plaza Manuel Rodríguez to a crowd of nearly two thousand people.

After the untimely death of band member 'El Bey' and the failed reformation of the band in 1991, Reisenegger announced a reunion concert on 27 May 2001 at Teatro Providencia. The concert was recorded into a live record named Pentagram Reborn 2001.

Reisenegger reformed the band in 2009 and released their debut album The Malefice in 2013, 28 years after the band's inception.

=== Fallout (1989) ===
Reisenegger was part of Fallout, a short-lived project; he only lasted a year in the group and then withdrew. Their style was more influenced by thrash and power metal, unlike his previous band that was clearly death metal.

They released two demos, which did not seem to gain much support. Yet despite the limited success of the project, this was the beginnings of what would be his most ambitious and well-known product: Criminal.

=== Lock Up (2006–present) ===
On 23 July 2006, Reisenegger was introduced as the new guitarist of the deathgrind project with Shane Embury, Nicholas Barker, and Tomas Lindberg, Lock Up.

=== Criminal (1991–present) ===
Criminal has been seen as the project in which the best of Reisenegger's ideas have been channeled and in which his musical journey has flourished. Criminal began in 1991 under the command of Reisenegger and Rodrigo Contreras, who were later joined by JJ Vallejo and Francisco "Cato" Cueto.

In 2000, due to many of the same difficulties that led to the breakdown of Pentagram, Reisenegger relocated to England. There he met the vocalist for Extreme Noise Terror, who offered the Chilean a position as the replacement for an absent guitarist for a tour. In this way, Reisenegger met Zac O'Neil, the drummer for Extreme Noise Terror, who manifested his willingness to explore other musical directions, including the possibility of working with Reisenegger. The latter did not hesitate to show O'neil his work from Criminal, which only served to further convince the drummer.

The Chilean joined O'Neil on a projected already being planned (Cradle of Filth) with Rob Eaglestone and Mark Rogue of Entwined. The style was Thrash Metal with industrial trends, a combination which served to motivated Reisenegger's return to Criminal. He reached out to Rodrigo Contreras and began recording Cancer, first international project and with a new lineup.

Since then, Criminal has been based between England and Spain. The band has been very well received by the public, and has performed in various concerts. Tours of Europe and sporadic visits to Chile have been the trend in recent years, each year gaining more followers and establishing notoriety.

=== United Forces (2012–present) ===
On 24 December 2012, it was announced that Reisenegger would become the guitarist of the United States-based heavy metal band United Forces, which features two former members of Stormtroopers of Death, vocalist Billy Milano and bassist Dan Lilker, and Nick Barker on drums.

== Discography ==
=== Pentagram ===
- Demo I (1987)
- Demo II (1987)
- Pentagram (2004)
- Fatal Prediction/Demoniac Possession (1987)
- Under The Spell of the Pentagram (2008)
- The Malefice (2013)

=== Fallout ===
- Demo I (1989)
- Demo II (1989)

=== Lock Up ===
- Necropolis Transparent (2011)
- Demonization (2017)

=== Criminal ===
- Demo (1992)
- Forked Demo (1992)
- Victimized (1994)
- Live Disorder (1996)
- Dead Soul (1997)
- Slave Masters (1998)
- Cancer (2000)
- No Gods No Masters (2004)
- Sicario (2005)
- White Hell (2009)
- Akelarre (2011)
- Fear Itself (2016)
