= Pentagram Chile =

Chilean thrash/death metal band

- Also known as: Pentagram (1985–1988, 1991–1992, 2001, 2009–2012)
- Origin: Santiago, Chile
- Genres: Thrash metal, death metal
- Years active: 1985–1988, 1991–1992, 2001, 2009–present
- Labels: Cyclone Empire, Picoroco, Chainsaw Murder
- Members: Anton Reisenegger; Juan Pablo “Azazel“ Uribe; Dan Biggin; Juan Pablo Donoso
- Past members: Alfredo “El Bey“ Peña; Marcelo Ulloa; Eduardo “Eurynomos“ Topelberg; Juan Francisco Cueto

Pentagram Chile (previously known as Pentagram) is an extreme metal band from Chile, formed in 1985. They were part of the first wave of extreme metal in the mid 1980s, along with bands like Possessed, Celtic Frost, Sepultura and others. Considered as a very influential band in the black metal and death metal genres, they have influenced bands like At the Gates, Dismember, Napalm Death and Avulsed among others.

== Early years (1985—1987) ==
Their first live performance was on December 28, 1985. The group then consisted of Anton Reisenegger (vocals, guitar) and Juan Pablo Uribe (guitar), two heavy metal fans who were influenced by thrash metal bands such as Exodus, Megadeth, and Metallica, as well as darker, wilder and more raw-edged stuff such as Slayer, Possessed, Kreator and Venom. At the time they played with drummer Eduardo Topelberg. He still had his group Chronos and it took him a year to decide to become a stable member of Pentagram. With this line-up, and with Anton playing the bass parts, Pentagram recorded Demo 1, in January 1987.

One of the characteristics of the thrash metal scene, and, in general, of the extreme metal underground at that time, was tape trading. This helped Pentagram get more fans and reviews in magazines and fanzines. This way, Pentagram made its name well known in Chile and abroad.

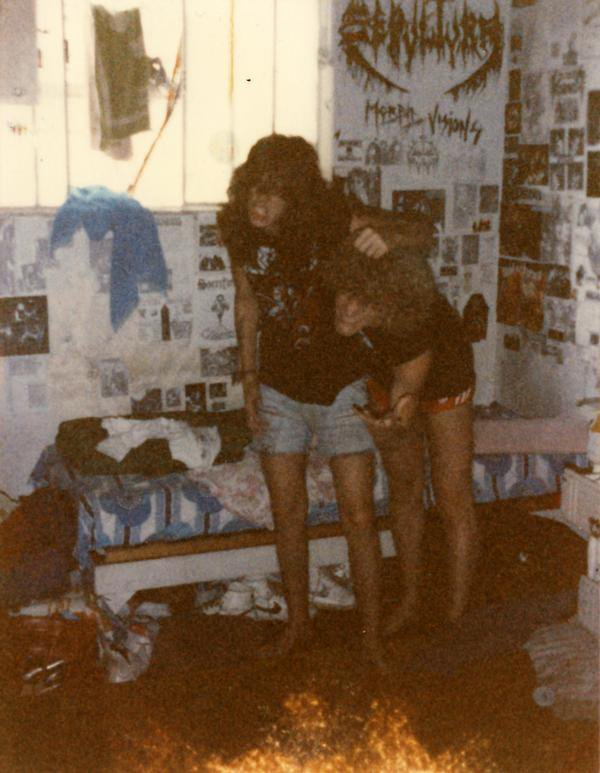
Reisenegger with Max Cavalera during their stay in Brazil to record an LP that was never released

Through letters, Reisenegger got in touch with the brothers Max and Igor Cavalera of Sepultura, who hosted him at their home in Belo Horizonte. In those days, the Brazilian group was about to release their first album Morbid Visions. Anton remembers the whole Cavalera family gathering around the TV when a commercial announcing the release of Sepultura's debut album was aired on local television.

Now back in Chile, Pentagram consolidated a stable line-up by adding bassist Alfredo "Bey" Peña to their ranks. 1987 was a watershed year for Pentagram, as the gigs were becoming more regular, they shared bills with groups such as Necrosis, Rust (later Warpath) and Chaos. These concerts were held mainly in the Manuel Plaza and Nataniel gyms in Santiago. The number of people in attendance was increasing in numbers. In September of that year, they recorded Demo 2, in which a big improvement in terms of sound quality and song writing can be heard.

Through tape trading, Pentagram were able to release a 7″ single in Switzerland via Chainsaw Murder Records. This single, containing the demo songs "Fatal Predictions" and "Demoniac Possession", was released by the owner of the label, a man who called himself Dinosaur and had worked as a roadie for Celtic Frost.

Despite enjoying the recognition of the metal scene, members of Pentagram were discouraged to see that there was no interest from domestic and foreign labels to sign them. The public admired them, paradoxically, spitting at them at each of their performances, which was a common practice at the time. The discomfort that this caused, coupled with the immaturity of its own members, sealed the end for the group, who left the scene in 1988 with a concert at Manuel Plaza with about two thousand people in attendance.

== Failed comeback (1991–1992) ==
In 1991, Anton Reisenegger tried to restart Pentagram, but this time without the original members, as it had been one year after the death of Bey Peña, and Eduardo Topelberg had returned to Dorso to help them record Romance. Instead, Reisenegger teamed up with drummer Marcelo Ulloa to record the demo White Hell. In this demo, Reisenegger recorded guitar, bass and vocals with Ulloa behind the drum kit. In search of a new bassist, Reisenegger found Miguel Angel Montenegro, after his stay as a session bass player for Chilean bands Squad and Fallout. This line-up failed to record any songs, even though they had a presentation with concert flyers displaying a picture of these aforementioned members.

== Pentagram's return (2000–2012) ==
In 2000, while Reisenegger was living in Europe, two demos plus a couple of live recordings from 1987 were reissued on CD by the now defunct Chilean label Picoroco Records. On May 27, 2001, a single reunion concert was held at a jam-packed Providencia theater. Old and new fans of the group were there to witness this historical reunion. On that occasion, three original members were there (Reisenegger, Topelberg and Uribe) as well as former Criminal bassist Juan Francisco Cueto Cato, who took over bass duties for the occasion because of Alfredo Peña's death. This concert included Pentagram's classic songs, as well as covers of Slayer and Venom plus an old unreleased song; it was published as a live album under the title Pentagram Reborn 2001.

In 2008, Under The Spell Of The Pentagram was released on digipack format containing a CD and DVD. The CD includes the first two demos, that had been previously released in 2000, and the DVD contains the Pentagram Reborn 2001 concert and three presentations in 1987 at gymnasium Manuel Plaza.

Pentagram reunited in 2009 for their first national tour, which began in the Chilean Metal Summit (June 14, Theatre Caupolicán). The second one was the European tour that took them to countries like Spain and Norway, ending in Wacken Festival, Germany. Another highlight was sharing stage with Atomic Aggressor as opening acts for the British Venom on December 9 at Teatro Caupolicán.

After three years of waiting since the original announcement, on January 23, 2012, a statement from the official Facebook page of the band was issued: "Just wanted to let you all know we have resumed work on the first Pentagram album!"

The delay was largely due to Reisenegger mainly working with Lock Up and Criminal with whom he released Akelarre in late 2011 and gave several concerts.

== Name change, The Malefice and Eternal Life of Madness (2012—present) ==
In May 2012, the band changed their name to Pentagram Chile, to avoid confusion with the American band of the same name.

In March 2013, the band announced they were releasing their debut album, titled The Malefice, in June or July of the same year, 28 years after the band's formation.

In January 2024, the band announced they had signed with Listenable Records and would be releasing their second album, Eternal Life of Madness, on April 26.

== Current members ==
- Anton Reisenegger — guitars, vocals (1985–present)
- Juan Pablo “Azazel“ Uribe — guitars (1985–present)
- Dan Biggin — bass (2009 (live), 2011–present)
- Juan Pablo Donoso — drums (2012–present)

== Discography ==
=== Studio albums ===
- The Malefice (2013)
- Eternal Life of Madness (2024)

=== Other releases ===
- Demo #1 (demo, 1987)
- Demo #2 (demo, 1987)
- White Hell (demo, 1991)
- Pentagram (compilation, 2000)
- Reborn 2001 (live album, 2001)
- Under the Spell of the Pentagram (compilation, 2008)
- The Demos (compilation, 2018)
- Past, Present and Future (compilation, 2019)
- Demos Collection 1986/1987 (boxed set, 2020)
