= Black Sabbath (disambiguation) =

Black Sabbath were an English heavy metal band.

Black Sabbath may also refer to:

- Black Sabbath (album), a 1970 album by Black Sabbath
  - "Black Sabbath" (song), the title song
- Black Sabbath (compilation), a 2006 album by Black Sabbath
- Black Sabbath (film), a 1963 horror film by Mario Bava
- Black Sabbath MC, an American motorcycle club
- 1942 Eleftherias Square roundup, or Black Sabbath, during the Holocaust in Greece
- Operation Agatha, or Black Sabbath, a 1946 British police and military operation against Jewish paramilitaries in Mandatory Palestine
- October 7 attacks, or the Black Saturday (Hebrew: השבת השחורה, romanized: HaShabbat HaShehorah), 2023 Hamas attacks on Israel
- Shabbat Chazon, or "black Sabbath", a Jewish Special Shabbat day
- Witches' Sabbath, or "black Sabbath", a purported gathering of witches
- "Black Sabbath", a song by Coven from the 1969 album Witchcraft Destroys Minds & Reaps Souls

== See also ==
- Black Saturday (disambiguation)
- Black Sunday (disambiguation)
- Witches' Sabbath (disambiguation)
