= Lock Up (British band) =

British grindcore band

- Origin: Sparkhill, Birmingham, England
- Genres: Grindcore; deathgrind; death metal
- Years active: 1998–present
- Labels: Nuclear Blast, Listenable, Dissonance, (Cherry Red Records)
- Members: Shane Embury; Kevin Sharp; Anton Reisenegger; Adam Jarvis
- Past members: Nick Barker; Jesse Pintado; Peter Tägtgren; Tomas Lindberg

Lock Up are an English grindcore supergroup.

== History ==
Shane Embury (Napalm Death, Venomous Concept), Nick Barker (ex-Cradle of Filth, Dimmu Borgir) and Jesse Pintado (Napalm Death, Terrorizer) formed the band. Peter Tägtgren (Hypocrisy) joined Lock Up for their 1999 debut album, Pleasures Pave Sewers. Tomas Lindberg (At the Gates, Disfear) joined for 2002's Hate Breeds Suffering and a Japanese tour.

Guitarist Anton Reisenegger (Pentagram Chile and Criminal) replaced the late Pintado.

Lock Up have played very few live shows. In 2009, the band announced that they would play the Damnation Festival that year. The line-up featured Embury, Barker, Lindberg and Reisenegger. It was billed as the band's last live show; they later booked more shows for 2010 and 2012. During February of that year, they scheduled a ten-show mini-tour in the United States, their first time playing there. Embury was unable to make the tour; Danny Lilker from Nuclear Assault filled in on bass.

On 3 December 2010, Lock Up uploaded their first new music in eight years, the track "Life of Devastation", to the band's official MySpace page. The song was set to appear on a split seven-inch single with Misery Index in 2011.

The band's third studio album, Necropolis Transparent, was recorded in November and December 2010 at HVR Studios in Ipswich, England, and features guest appearances by Peter Tägtgren and Jeff Walker (Carcass, Brujeria). It was released on 1 July in Europe and 12 July in North America by Nuclear Blast Records.

The fourth album, Demonization, was released in March 2017 through Listenable Records. Kevin Sharp (Brutal Truth, Venomous Concept) performed the vocals.

In April 2020, it was announced that drummer Nick Barker had left the band. He was replaced with Adam Jarvis less than a month later. In February 2021, it was announced former singer Tomas Lindberg had rejoined the band and would share vocals with Sharp.

== Members ==
Current

- Shane Embury – bass (1998–present)
- Anton Reisenegger – guitar (2006–present)
- Kevin Sharp – vocals (2014–present)
- Adam Jarvis – drums (2020–present)

Former

- Nick Barker – drums (1998–2020)
- Jesse Pintado – guitar (1998–2006; his death)
- Peter Tägtgren – vocals (1998–2002)
- Tomas Lindberg – vocals (2002–2014, 2021–2025; his death)

Touring musicians

- Barry Savage – guitar (2002)
- Danny Lilker – bass (2012)

== Discography ==
- Pleasures Pave Sewers (1999)
- Hate Breeds Suffering (2002)
- Play Fast or Die: Live in Japan (2005)
- Necropolis Transparent (2011)
- Demonization (2017)
- The Dregs of Hades (2021)
