= Witches Going to Their Sabbath =

1878 painting

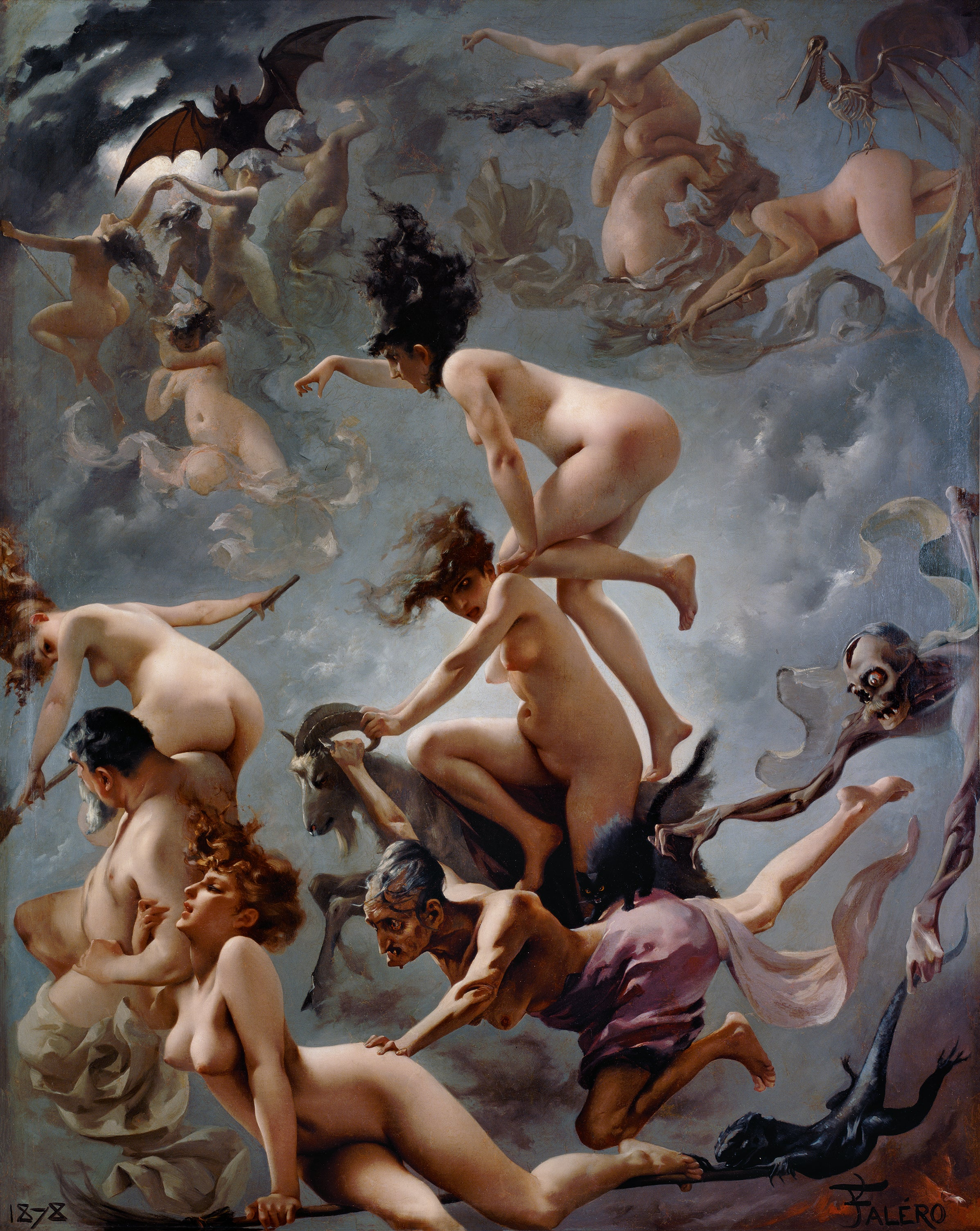
- Artist: Luis Ricardo Falero
- Year: 1878
- Medium: Oil on poplar wood
- Dimensions: 145,4 cm × 117,5 cm (572 in × 463 in)

Witches going to their Sabbath, or The Witches' Sabbath (Spanish: Brujas yendo al Sabbath) is a painting by the Spanish Luis Ricardo Falero, made in 1878. It is currently in a private collection.

== Description ==
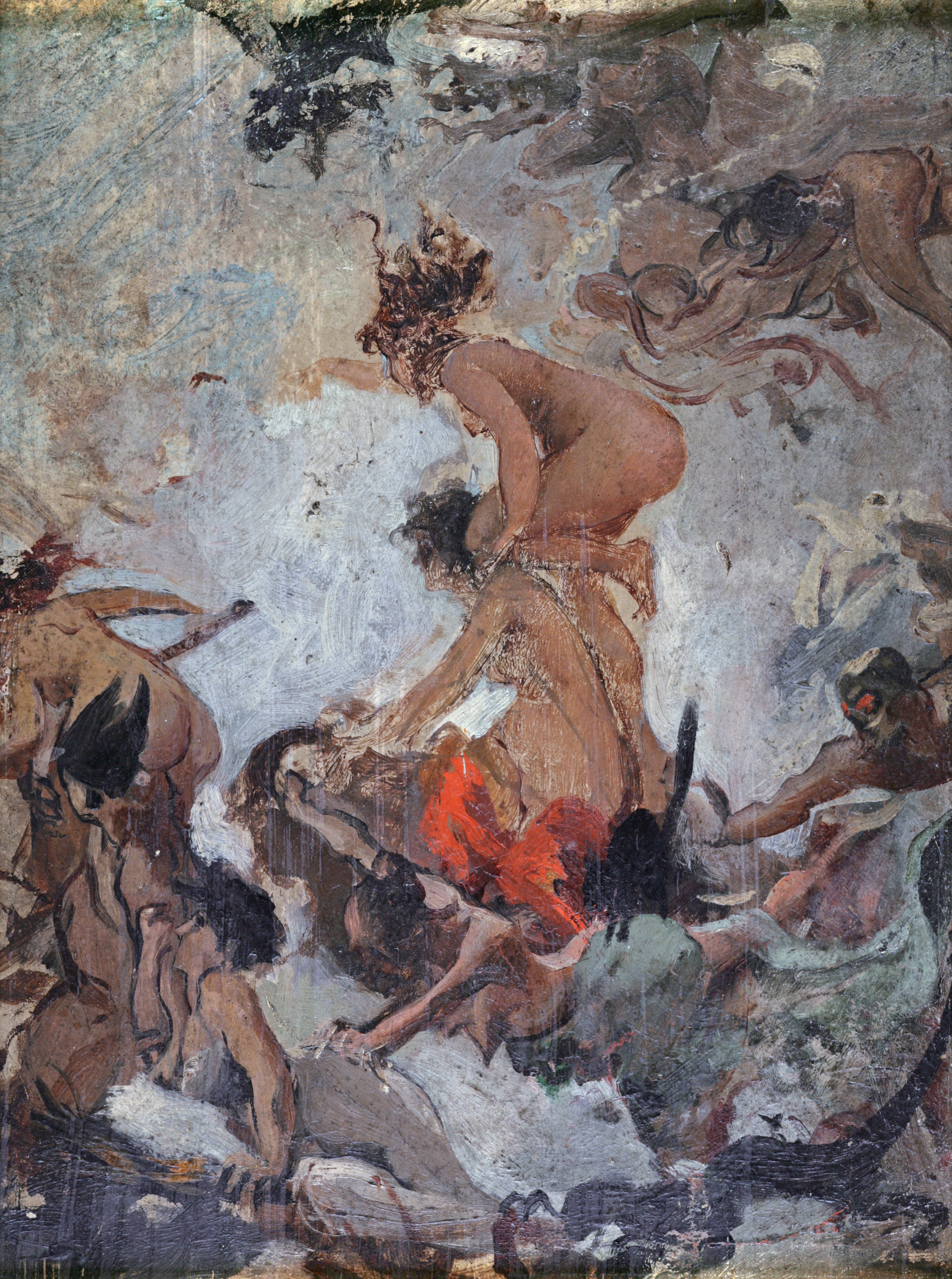
Study for the painting

The painting shows a group of witches, almost all naked, flying to participate in a Sabbath, a meeting place where black magic rituals and orgies were performed. Other creatures associated with witchcraft also appear, such as a bat, a goat, and a black cat. Among the various figures, a group in the foreground stands out, consisting of two witches, one of whom is riding a goat and the other is an old witch who is holding on to one of the goat's horns and leaning on a young witch with red hair (who in turn is clinging to a wizard). On the right side of the painting are three other sinister creatures: the skeleton of a pelican (a symbol of death in Egyptian tradition) and a skeletal living human corpse and a salamander (a spirit of fire according to alchemists).

The work follows a spiral layout, due to the rotating rhythm of the characters against the background.

The painting has very uniform tones and, despite being set at night, there is a lot of light, thanks to the moon.

Falero was known for his paintings depicting witches in a sensual manner, often drawn astride their broomsticks, and this painting gives the viewer a sense of ecstasy due to the women's spinning flight. Such paintings were very successful in Victorian England, as the public was interested in esoteric and occult themes, which were appreciated by the decadent taste of the time.
