= Pleasures Pave Sewers =

Studio album by Lock Up
- Released: 31 May 1999
- Genre: Grindcore
- Length: 29:08
- Label: Nuclear Blast
- Producer: Peter Tägtgren

Lock Up chronology
Pleasures Pave Sewers (1999)	Hate Breeds Suffering (2002)

Professional ratings
Review scores
Source	Rating
AllMusic	3.5/5 stars

Pleasures Pave Sewers is the debut album by grindcore band Lock Up, a side project of Napalm Death, featuring Peter Tägtgren on vocals. According to engineer Andy Sneap, the album was recorded in a day and was never mixed.

== Background ==
According to Shane Embury, the origins of the project go back to the time Napalm Death were working on the Words from the Exit Wound album. In 2010 he told Kerrang!:

I was hanging around with Nick Barker, who was playing drums for Cradle of Filth at the time. We were... getting drunk and listening to our favourite thrash, speed and grindcore bands. All the time we were just wanting to do something that was a return to the days of From Enslavement to Obliteration and World Downfall by Terrorizer. It was very quickly done, very spontaneous and based on energy and performance... With Lock Up we wanted to go back to the old days of thrashing a record out and recapturing that sense of early excitement.

== Track listing ==
1. "After Life in Purgatory" (2:08)
2. "Submission" (2:46)
3. "Triple Six Suck Angels" (2:58)
4. "Delirium" (1:56)
5. "Pretenders of the Throne" (1:45)
6. "Slow Bleed Gorgon / Pleasures Pave Sewers" (3:36)
7. "Ego Pawn" (1:53)
8. "The Dreams Are Sacrificed" (2:06)
9. "Tragic Faith" (2:30)
10. "Darkness of Ignorance" (2:23)
11. "Salvation thru' Destruction" (2:24)
12. "Leech Eclipse" (0:56)
13. "Fever Landscapes" (1:47)

== Credits ==
- Peter Tägtgren – vocals
- Nick Barker – drums
- Shane Embury – bass
- Jesse Pintado – guitars
