= Witches' Sabbath (disambiguation) =

A Witches' Sabbath is a legendary ritual associated with witchcraft.

Witches' Sabbath may also refer to:

- Witches' Sabbath (Goya, 1798), a painting by Francisco Goya in the Museo Lázaro Galdiano, Madrid
- Witches' Sabbath (The Great He-Goat), a painting by Francisco Goya in the Museo del Prado, Madrid
- Witches' Sabbath (novel), by Paula Allardyce

== See also ==
- The Witches' Sabbath, 1988 French-Italian film
- Witches Going to Their Sabbath, or The Witches' Sabbath, a painting by Luis Ricardo Falero
- Black Sabbath (disambiguation)
