= Metal.de =

German heavy metal online magazine

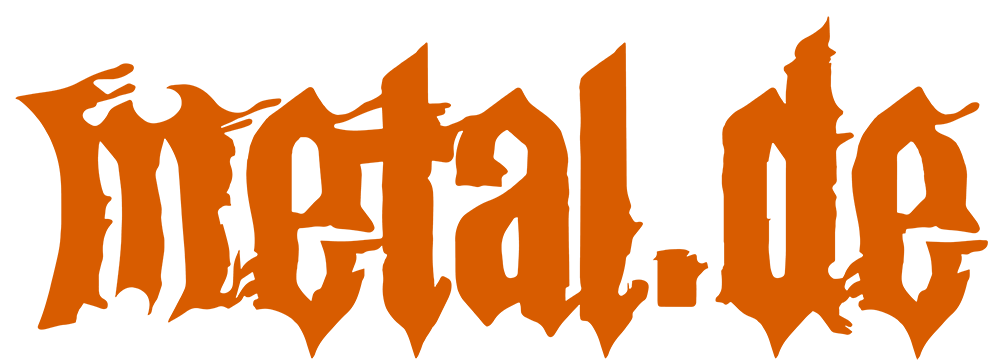
- Website type: News and reviews
- Website: metal.de
- Launched: 1996
- Current status: Active

Metal.de is a German-language online magazine launched in 1996. The magazine focuses on the subgenres of heavy metal and hard rock, but also reports on similar styles. Metal.de foundation in 1996 makes it one of the longest-running heavy metal websites from Germany. It is based in Stuttgart.

Metal.de is a subsidiary of Versus Media UG based in Kämpfelbach. Today, it is associated with Hi-Media S.A., a company that works with Rolling Stone, Metal Hammer, Michelin, among other brands in Germany. Its publishers are Norman Sickinger, Markus Endres and Marc Furrer. Since September 2017, Jan Wischkowski and Alex Klug are co-editors in chief.

With more than 400,000 page views per month with 147,000 visitors, Metal.de is the widest-reaching metal online magazine in the German-speaking world.

== History ==
Metal.de was first launched on 1 October 1996 under the name The Dark Site online. The first editor-in-chief Truhe programmed the site himself and built up the content with friends. As early as 1997, the team added small audio clips in real audio format to the CD reviews. In 1998, the first major update followed, as well as its own small search engine, the first German metal mailing list and a newsletter. Since 1999 there have been cooperations with advertising partners and event organizers, as well as another update. This year also renamed Metal.de. In 2004, a new forum was activated and the layout and logo were also revised.

On 27 October 2006, Metal.de celebrated its 10th anniversary with a show that featured Disillusion, Equilibrium, Neaera, Criminal and Undertow at LKA Longhorn, Stuttgart. For the event, the online magazine Vampster created a contest with three double tickets as prizes.

In March 2011, the technology and design of the site changed once more. Single genre portals were Introduced, which allowed to filter of the content by individual metal genres.

Along with record label Nuclear Blast, Metal.de has co-presented several German tours, including those by Behemoth and Cannibal Corpse, Vader, Hate Eternal and Threat Signal, and Suffocation and Fleshgod Apocalypse.

In addition to its online services, Metal.de has its own stand at festivals. For example, it has organised autograph sessions at Summer Breeze Open Air for many years.
