= Sicario (album) =

- Cover art by Claudio Bergamin

Studio album by Criminal
- Released: September 5, 2005
- Recorded: 2005
- Genre: Thrash metal, death metal
- Length: 46:54
- Label: Metal Blade Records

Criminal chronology
No Gods No Masters (2004)	Sicario (2005)	White Hell (2009)

Professional ratings
Review scores
Source	Rating
Blabbermouth	6/10 stars
metal.de	8/10

Sicario is the fifth studio album by the thrash metal/death metal band Criminal. It was released on September 5, 2005 in Europe and on 2006 in Chile. It was released by Metal Blade Records. The album's first single was "Rise and Fall", performed for the first time at Teatro Caupolican" in Chile on May 13, 2006.

== Track listing ==
1. "Rise and Fall" – 3:43
2. "Time Bomb" – 3:31
3. "Walking Dead" – 4:57
4. "The Root of All Evil" – 4:28
5. "Shot In The Face" – 4:28
6. "Sicario" – 4:19
7. "The Land God Forgot" – 3:51
8. "Preacher of Hate" – 3:25
9. "Touch of Filth" – 3:31
10. "From the Ashes" – 3:58
11. "Por la Fuerza de la Razón" – 4:48
12. "Self Destruction" (bonus track) – 2:58
