= Dan Biggin =

English musician

- Also known as: Danny B
- Born: 1 August 1980 (age 46)
- Genres: Death metal, thrash metal, extreme metal
- Occupation: Musician
- Instruments: Bass, guitar
- Labels: Massacre Records, Cyclone Empire Records

Dan Biggin, more commonly known professionally as Danny B, is an English guitarist and bassist performing with thrash band Criminal, death metal band Pentagram Chile and is also involved in his own side projects Takoma Star and Flight 19.

== Biography ==
Biggin is a record producer, mix engineer, mastering engineer, live sound engineer, and owner of HVR Recording Studios in Suffolk, U.K. where he has produced bands such as Pentagram Chile, Criminal, Agonyst, Brainchoke, Beef Conspiracy and Lock Up.

As a live musician he has performed playing guitar or bass with bands such as Criminal, Pentagram Chile, Annihilated, Trespass, Takoma Star and filling in under the name 'El Sucio' for metal group Brujeria.

He completed a summer tour in Europe doing front of house sound for American Nu-Metal band Ill Niño followed by a short run of shows in Australia. He was also front of house sound engineer for Devilment (the new band of Cradle of Filth frontman Dani Filth) on the main stage at the 2017 edition of Bloodstock Open Air.

He worked on a full world tour for Cradle of Filth in a dual role as Tour Manager and Front of House Sound Engineer.

== Discography (as musician) ==
=== N.C.A. (guitars) ===
- "Something for the weakened" E.P. (2014) – Unreleased

=== Anihilated (guitars) (2013–2017) ===
- "Anti Social Engineering" (2015) – 7th Vile Records

=== Criminal (bass) (2006–present) ===
- White Hell (2009) – Massacre Records
- Akelarre (2011) – Massacre Records
- "Fear Itself" (2016) – Metal Blade Records

=== Pentagram (bass) (2009 (live), 2011–present) ===
- "Demented" Split 7" with Master
- The Malefice (2013)
- "Ritual Human Sacrifice" (2015)

=== Takoma Star (vocals and guitars) (2006–present) ===
- "To This Day E.P." (2007)
- "Stockholm" – single (2008)
- "Live O.B.S. Vol. 1" (2009)
- "Till The Fall" (2009)
- "The Action Goes Here E.P." (2014) – Unreleased
