= Black Sabbath Motorcycle Club =

Black Sabbath Motorcycle Club Nation
- Abbreviation: BSMC, 214
- Founded: February 17, 1974
- Founders: The Original 7 - President Robert D. Hubbard "Hubbard", (SDG&E Electrician), Vice President: William Charles Sanders "Couchie" (SDG&E Electrician), Sgt-At-Arms: Alvin Ray "Stretch", Road Captain: Paul Perry "Pep" (SDG&E Meter-Reader), Asst. Road Captain: Solomon "Sol", Secretary: John Kearny "Black", the last founding member's name has been lost to history
- Location(s): San Diego, California,
- Region served: National (14 chapters in the USA)
- National President: Big Meech
- Key people: Robert D. Hubbard, William Charles Sanders, Alvin Ray, Paul Perry, Solomon, John Kearny, Clayton Mitchell
- Website: blacksabbathmc.com

The Black Sabbath Motorcycle Club Nation is a national Motorcycle Club whose members ride all makes of street legal motorcycles (cruisers at least 750cc and sport bikes at least 600cc). As of 2014, it is not listed by the United States Department of Justice or California Department of Justice as an Outlaw Motorcycle Club or Gang.

== Mission ==
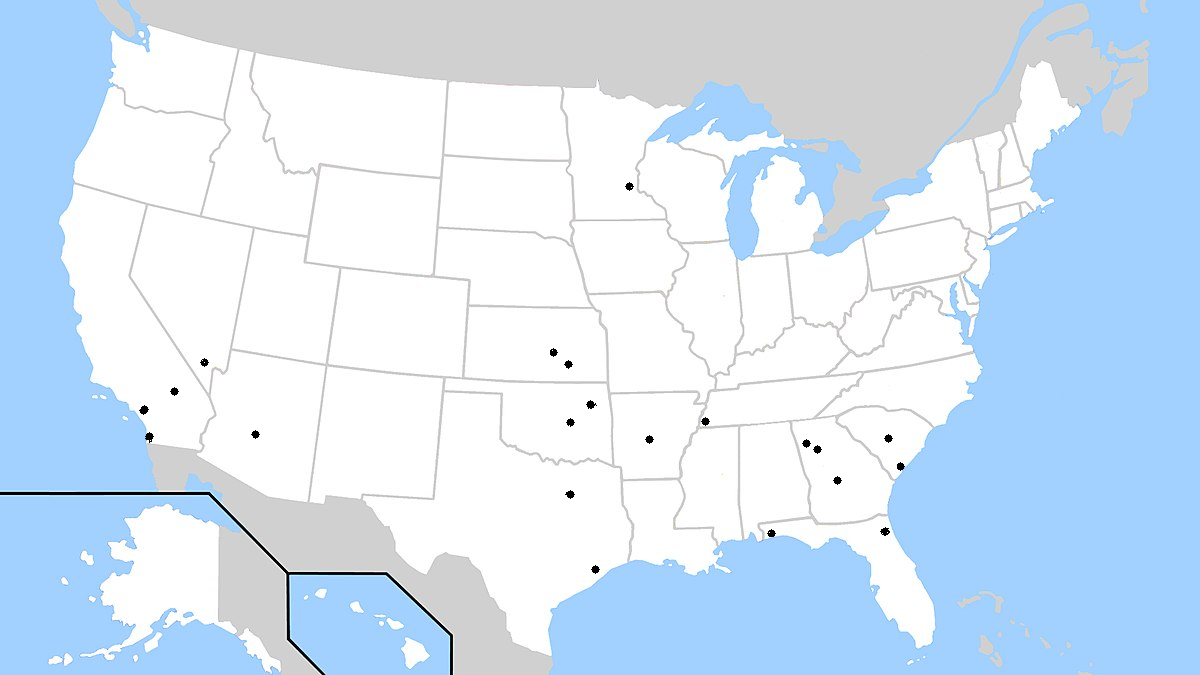
As of 2020
