= White Hell =

Studio album by Criminal
- Released: February 27, 2009
- Recorded: 2009 - Colchester, England
- Genres: Thrash metal, death metal
- Length: 50:09
- Label: Massacre Records
- Producer: Danny Biggin

Criminal chronology
Sicario (2005)	White Hell (2009)	Akelarre (2011)

Professional ratings
Review scores
Source	Rating
Blabbermouth	7/10 stars

White Hell is the sixth studio album by Chilean thrash metal/death metal band Criminal. It was released on February 27, 2009. It's also the third album performed released in United Kingdom and the second with the current members.

The album was produced and released with a bonus DVD that was released in Europe on the same date. The DVD contains a compilation of various unreleased performances from the band, like the show supporting Megadeth in April 2008 in front of 10,000 people in "Arena Santiago", Santiago de Chile. In spite of being released Massacre Records, the band recording in bassist Dan Biggin's studio. The first single, "21st Century Paranoia" was presented in Chile in January 2010 during the "White Hell Tour". On March 10 "Incubus" music video, directed by Carlos Toro, was released.

== Track listing ==
1. "21st Century Paranoia" – 3:51
2. "Crime and Punishment" – 5:10
3. "Incubus" – 3:44
4. "Black Light" – 3:44
5. "The Deluge" – 4:12
6. "Strange Ways" – 4:40
7. "Mobrule" – 2:56
8. "The Infidel" – 4:09
9. "Invasion" – 4:29
10. "Eyes of Temptation" – 3:41
11. "Bastardom" – 4:00
12. "Sons of Cain" – 5:33
13. "Brothers Insame (bonus track)
