= Akelarre (Criminal album) =

Studio album by Criminal
- Released: August 19, 2011
- Recorded: 2010–2011
- Genre: Thrash metal, death metal
- Length: 41:24
- Label: Metal Blade Records

Criminal chronology
White Hell (2009)	Akelarre (2011)

Akelarre is the seventh studio album by the thrash metal/death metal band Criminal.

== Track listing ==
1. "Order from Chaos" – 4:53
2. "Resistance Is Futile" – 4:40
3. "The Ghost We Summoned" – 4:03
4. "Akelarre" – 1:59
5. "State of Siege" – 4:10
6. "Tyrannicide" – 4:21
7. "Feel the Void" – 4:40
8. "The Power of the Dog" – 3:35
9. "Vows of Silence" – 4:16
10. "La Santa Muerte" – 4:47
