= Dead Soul =

Studio album by Criminal
- Released: 1997
- Recorded: May to July 1997
- Genre: Thrash metal, death metal
- Length: 50:09
- Label: Inferno, BMG, Metal Blade
- Producer: Criminal

Criminal chronology
Victimized (1994)	Dead Soul (1997)	Cancer (2000)

Dead Soul is the second studio album by Chilean thrash metal/death metal band Criminal. It was released in 1997 by the band's own Inferno Records and produced by Vincent Wojnar who had worked with bands such as Kreator and Machine Head. The album was released in Santiago de Chile and presented in a concert supporting Napalm Death. Mitch Harris from Napalm Death came to the stage to play "Demoniac Possession" Pentagram with Criminal. The promotional tour included countries such as Argentina, Peru, Uruguay, Venezuela and Colombia, where the band performed at the "Rock the Park" festival in front of 50,000 people. Music videos "Collide", "Victimized" and "Slave Masters" were broadcast on major television channels.

== Style ==
According to Rock Hard magazine, the album is clearly rooted in Death Metal and reminds of early pieces by Sepultura.

== Reception ==
Dead Soul sold over 10,000 copies in Chile. Metal Blade Records distributed the album in United States and Europe, earning very positive reviews in related magazines such as Rock Hard in Germany and the American Metal Maniacs.

== Track listing ==
1. "Denial" – 3:00
2. "Scapegoat" – 3:11
3. "Collide" – 3:04
4. "Terror" – 2:31
5. "Life Is Agony" – 4:36
6. "No Salvation" – 3:15
7. "Victimized" – 3:01
8. "S.S.S." – 2:43
9. "Hijos De La Miseria" – 4:36
10. "Slave Master" – 2:21
11. "Nation of Hate" – 3:01
12. "Guilt" – 4:48

All songs composed by Criminal.
