= Luis Ricardo Falero =

Spanish painter (1851–1896)

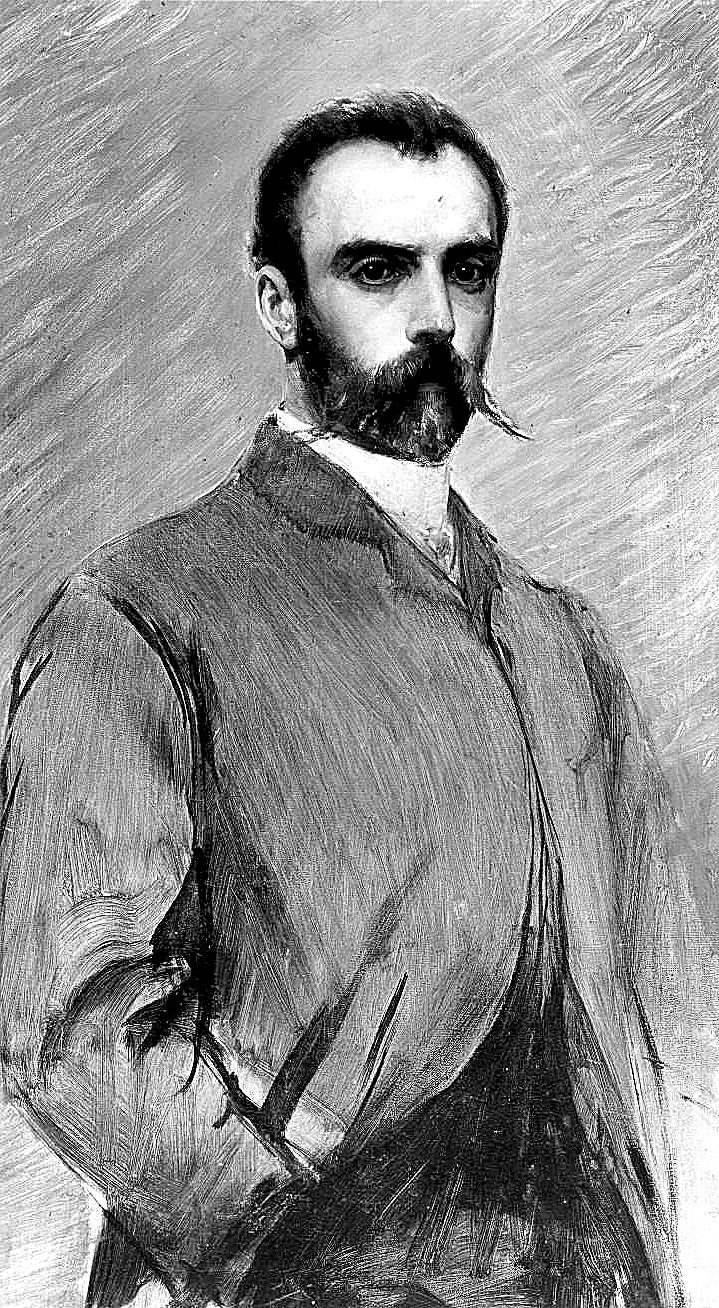
- Self-Portrait, c. 1880
- Born: Luis Ricardo Falero; 23 May 1851; Granada, Spain
- Died: 7 December 1896 (aged 45); London, England
- Education: Paris, London
- Known for: Painting

Luis Ricardo Falero (23 May 1851 – 7 December 1896) was a Spanish painter. He specialized in female nudes and mythological, orientalist and fantasy settings. His most common medium was oil on canvas. Falero’s paintings are held mostly within private collections in Europe and the United States, although a watercolour of the Twin Stars is in the collection of the Metropolitan Museum of Art, New York.

In England, Falero sometimes gave himself the title of Duke of Labranzano, a fictitious place name.

== Biography ==
Falero was born in Granada and originally pursued a career in the Spanish Navy, but gave it up to his parents' disappointment. He travelled on foot to Paris, where he studied art, chemistry and mechanical engineering. The experiments which he had to conduct in the latter two were dangerous, leading him to decide to focus on painting alone. He was a student of Gabriel Ferrier. After Paris, he studied in London, where he eventually settled.

Falero had a particular interest in astronomy and incorporated celestial constellations into many of his works, such as The Marriage of a Comet and Twin Stars. His interest and knowledge of astronomy also led him to illustrate the works of Camille Flammarion.

In 1889, in Rochford, Essex, Falero married Maria Cristina Spinelli, and in 1891 they were living at 100 Fellows Road, Hampstead. His wife was Italian and had a connection with Atina in the Province of Frosinone.

In 1896, the year of his death, Maud Harvey sued Falero for paternity. The suit alleged that Falero seduced Harvey in 1894, when she was 15, first serving as his housemaid, and then model. When he discovered she was pregnant, he dismissed her. She won the case and was awarded five shillings per week in support of their child.

Falero died at University College Hospital, London, at the age of 45, leaving an estate valued for probate at £1,139. His widow María Cristina Falero was his executrix.

In 1937, following the Second Italo-Ethiopian War, an Italian War Cross of Military Valor was awarded to Riccardo Falero of Atina, Frosinone, referencing Maria Cristina Spinelli, suggesting that Falero had a son posthumously.

== Gallery ==
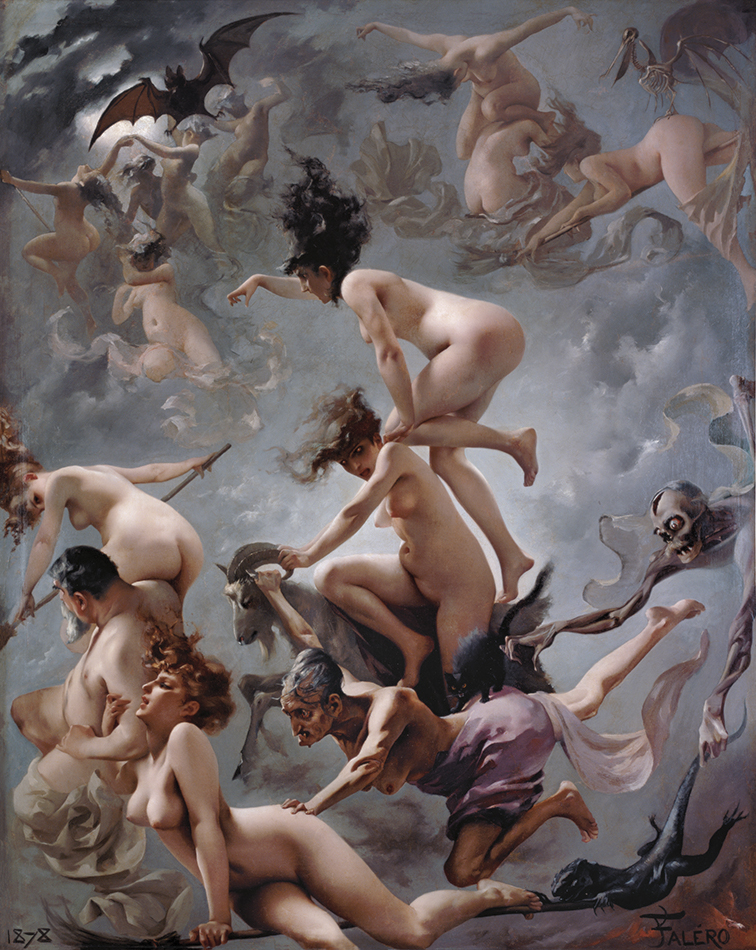
Witches going to their Sabbath (1878)

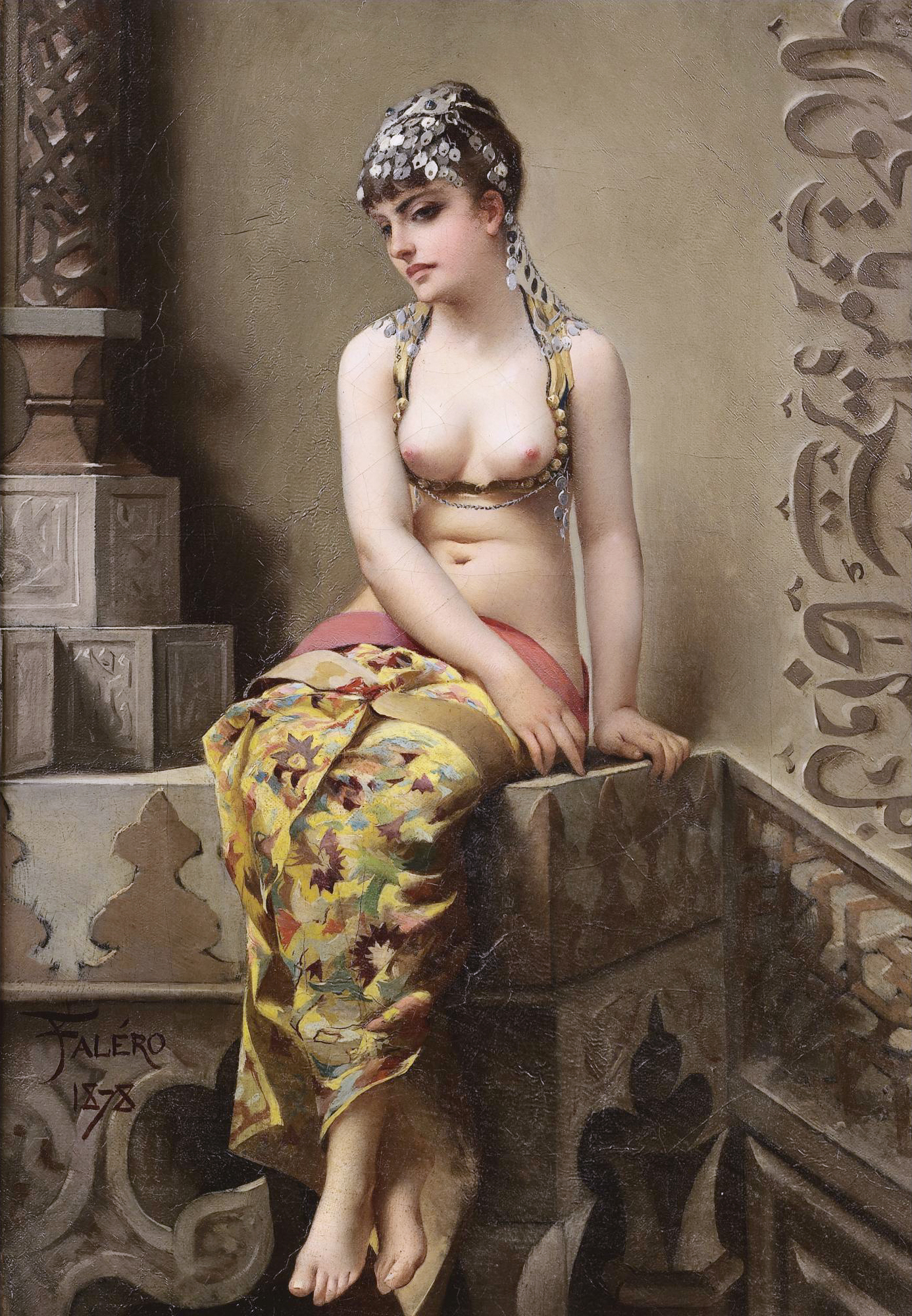
The Enchantress (1878)

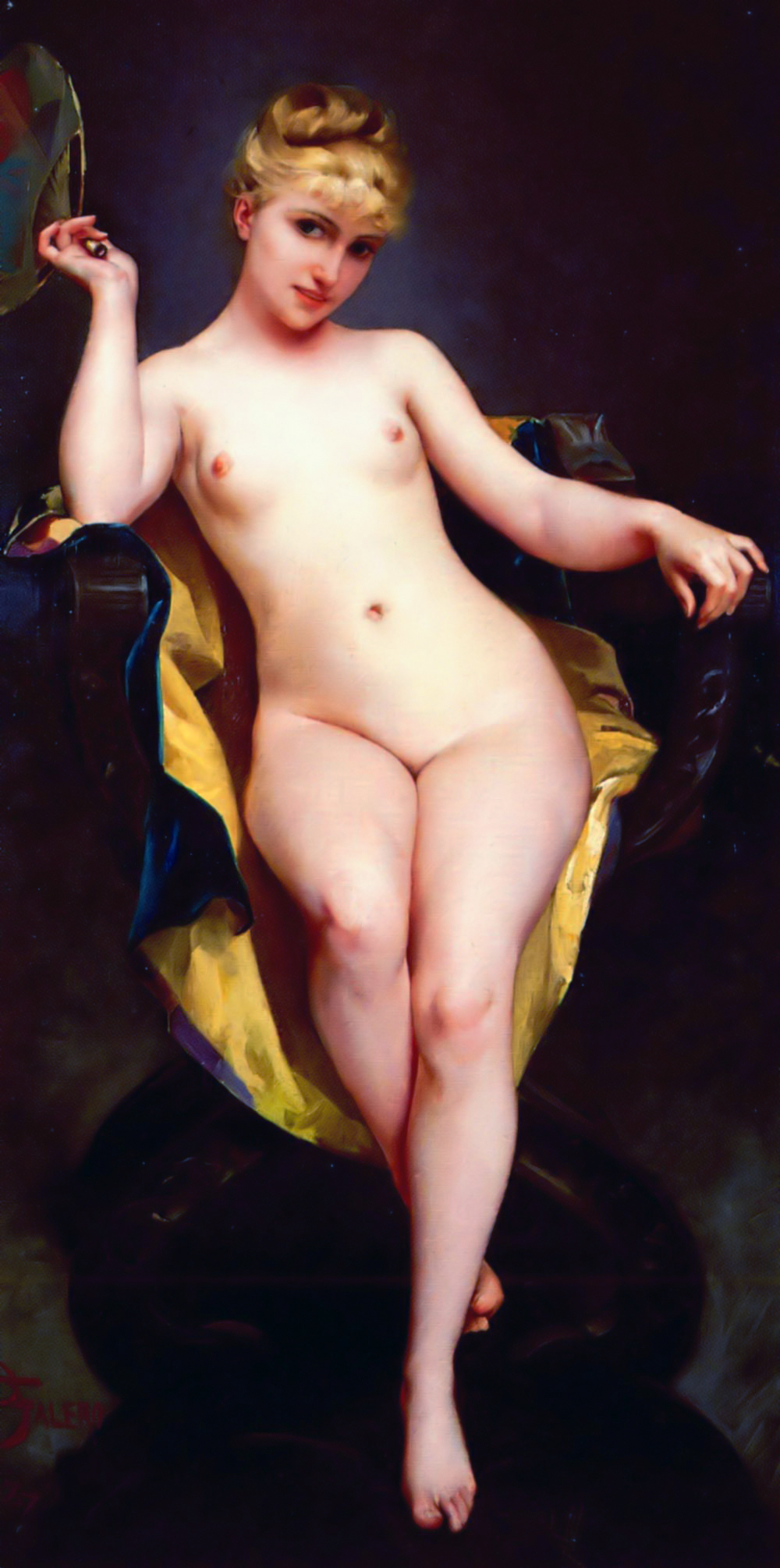
Posing (1879)

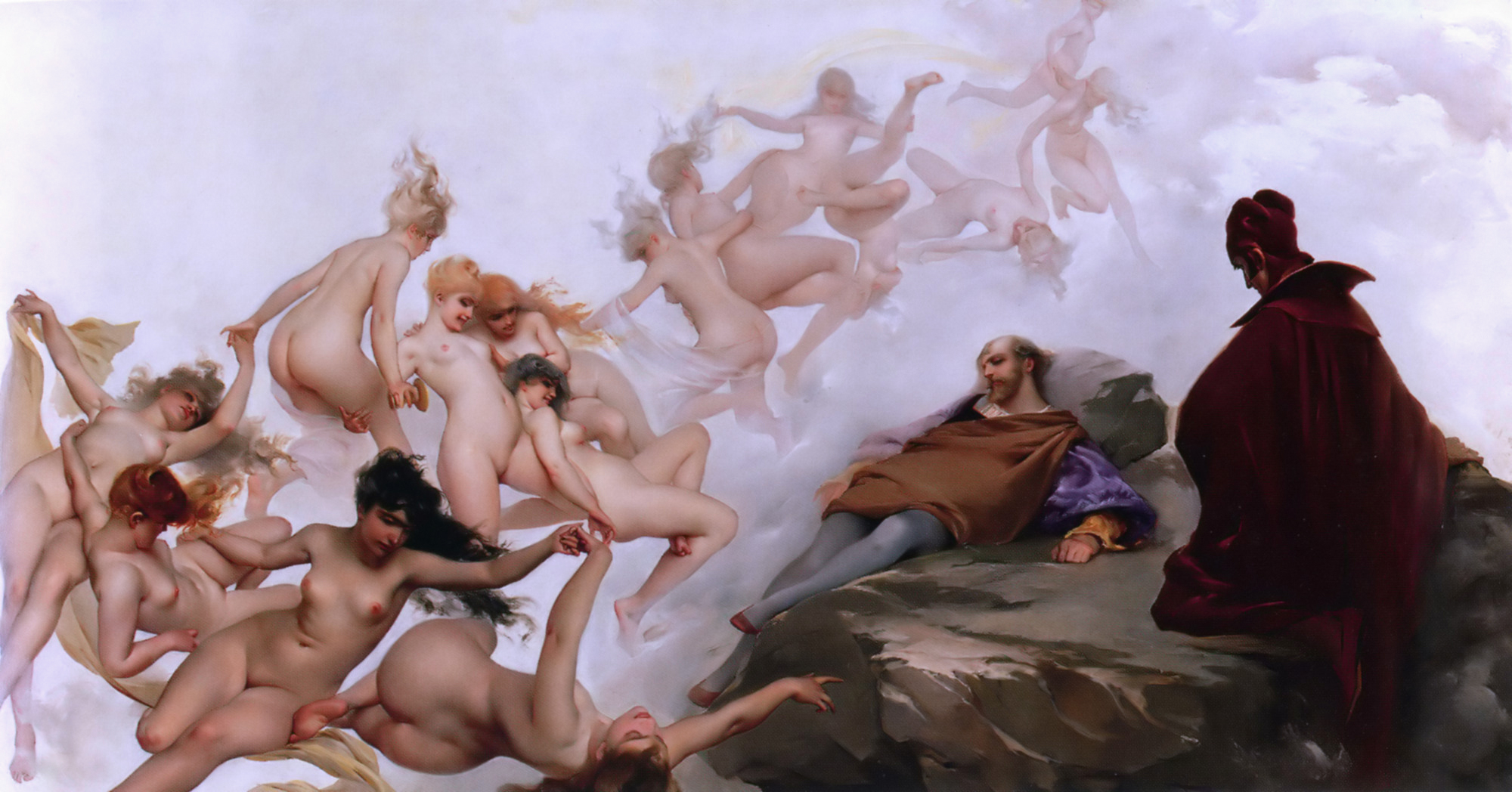
Faust's Dream (1880)

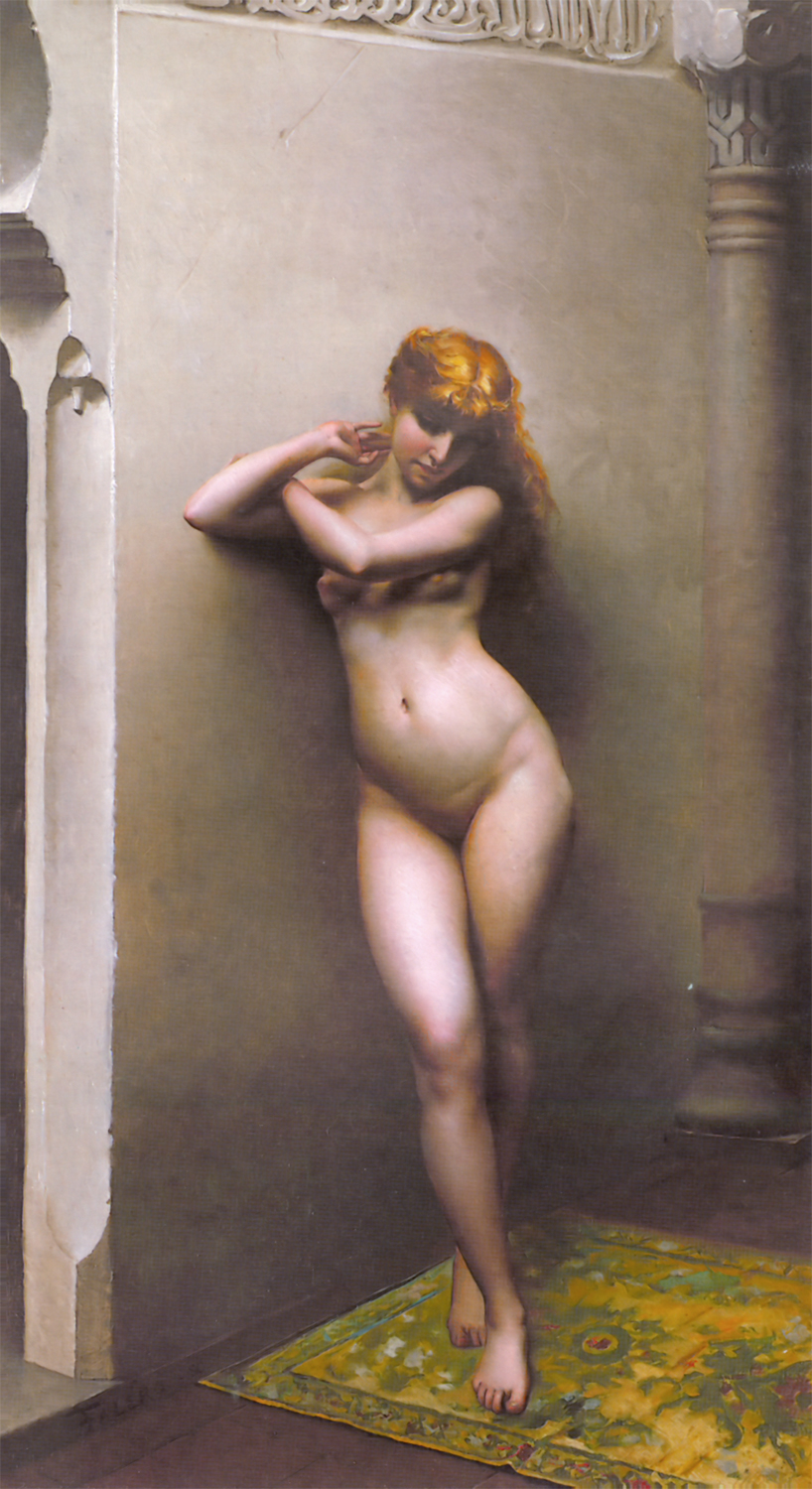
La Favorite (1880)

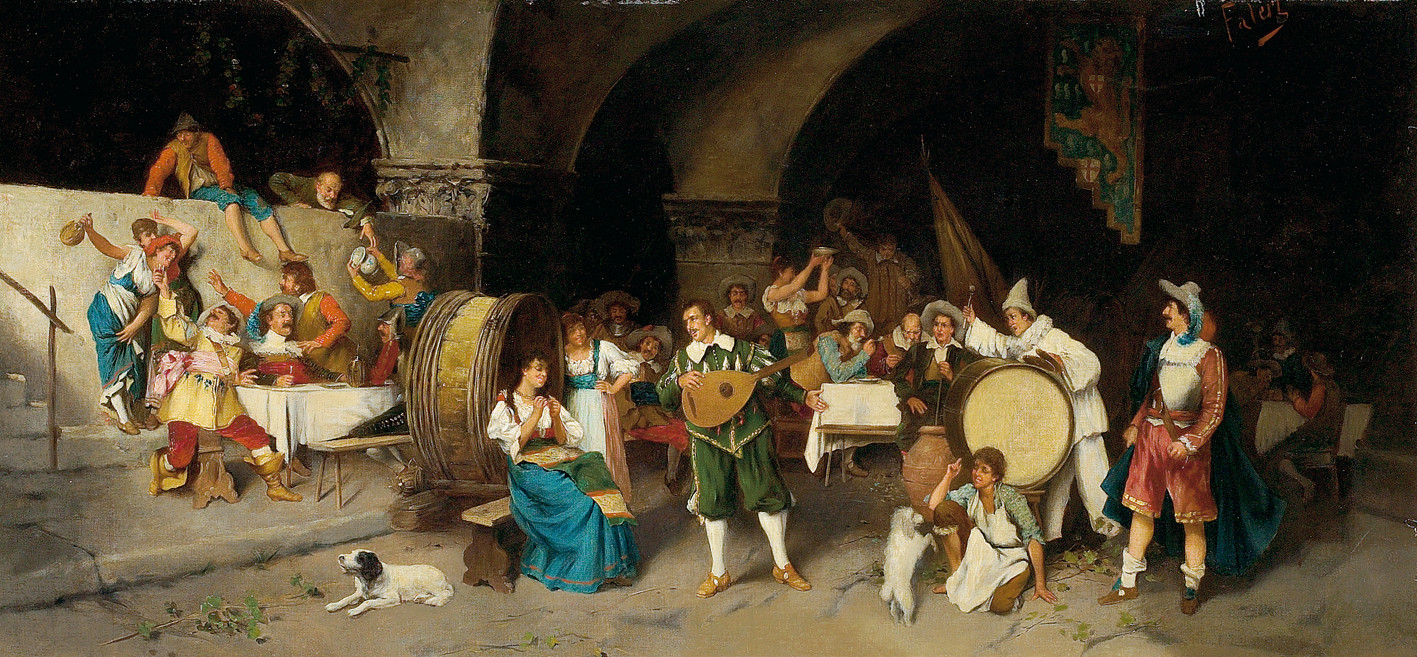
Fiesta in the Tavern (1880)

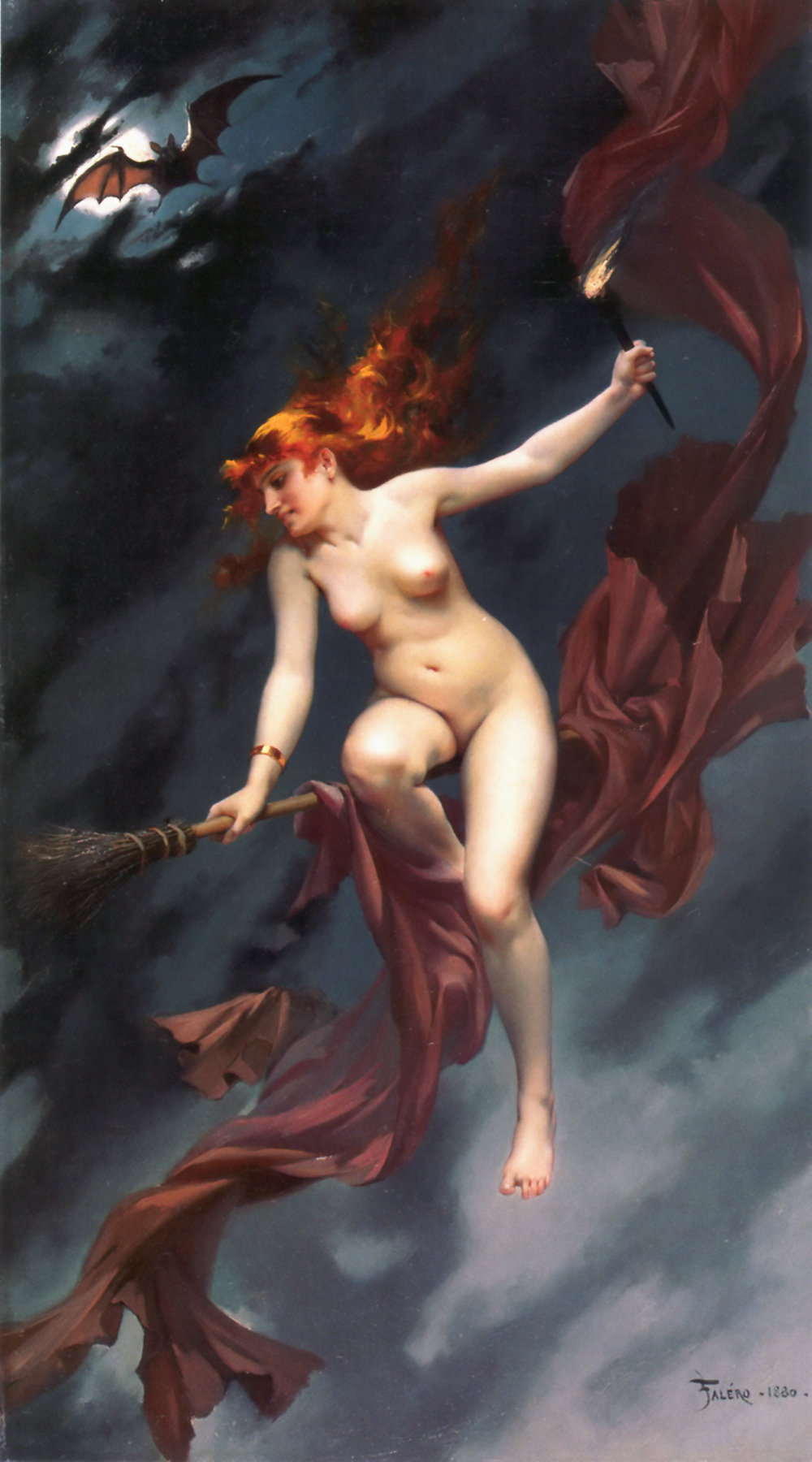
Festival of the Witches (1880)

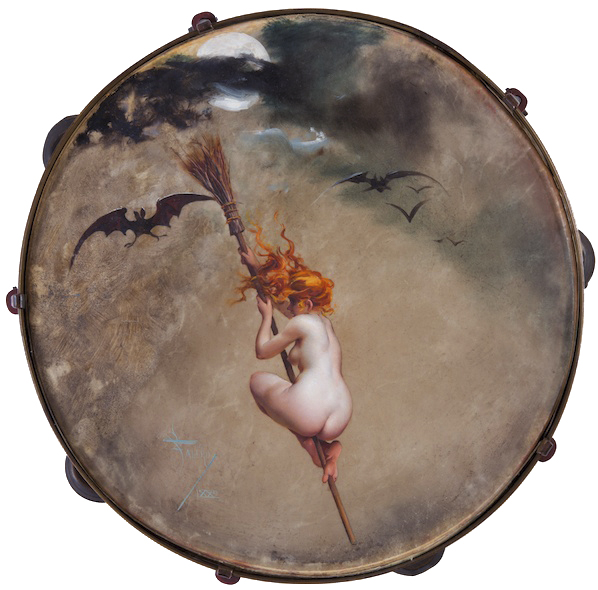
The witch, painted on a tambourine (1882)

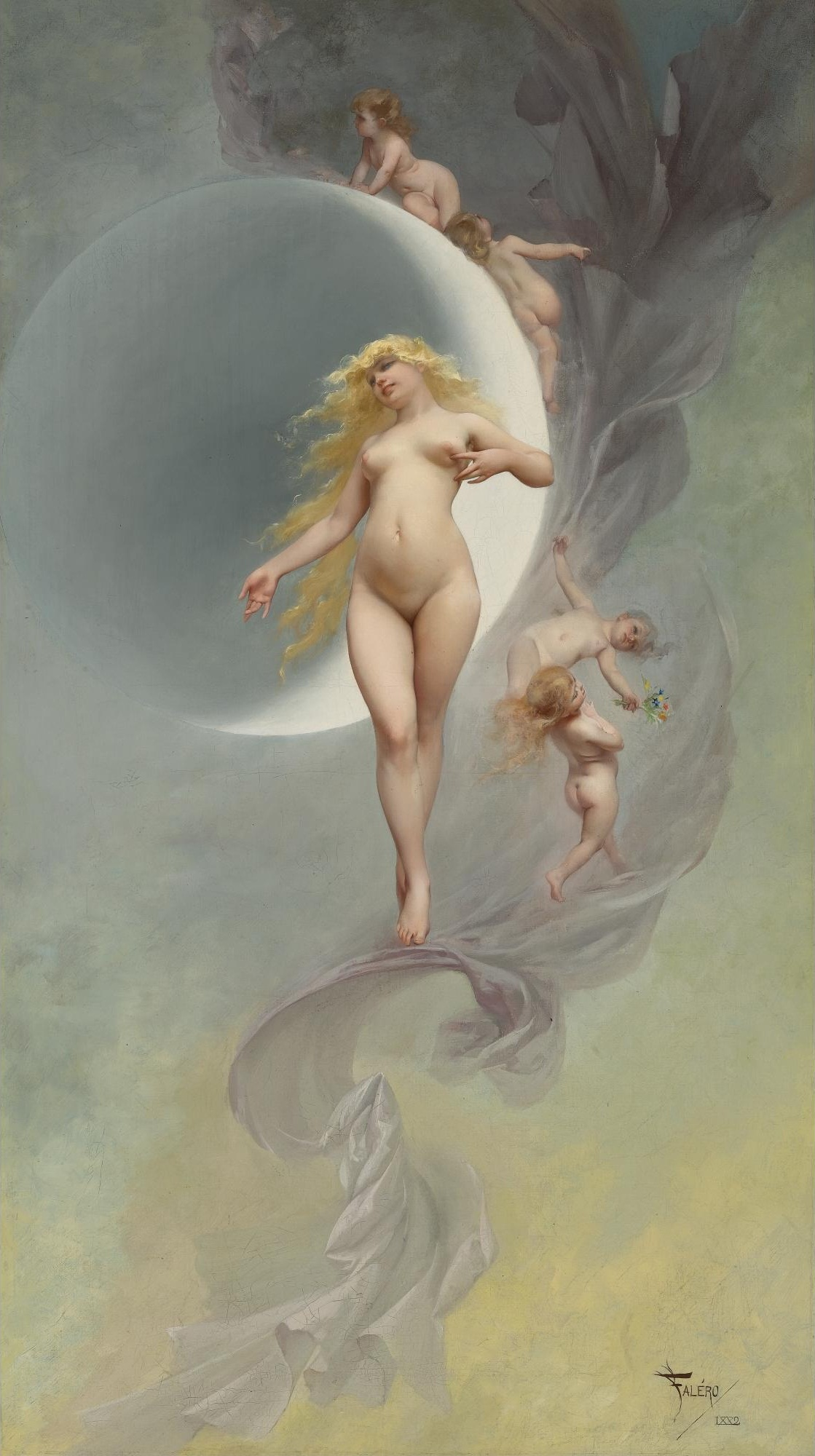
The Planet Venus (1882)

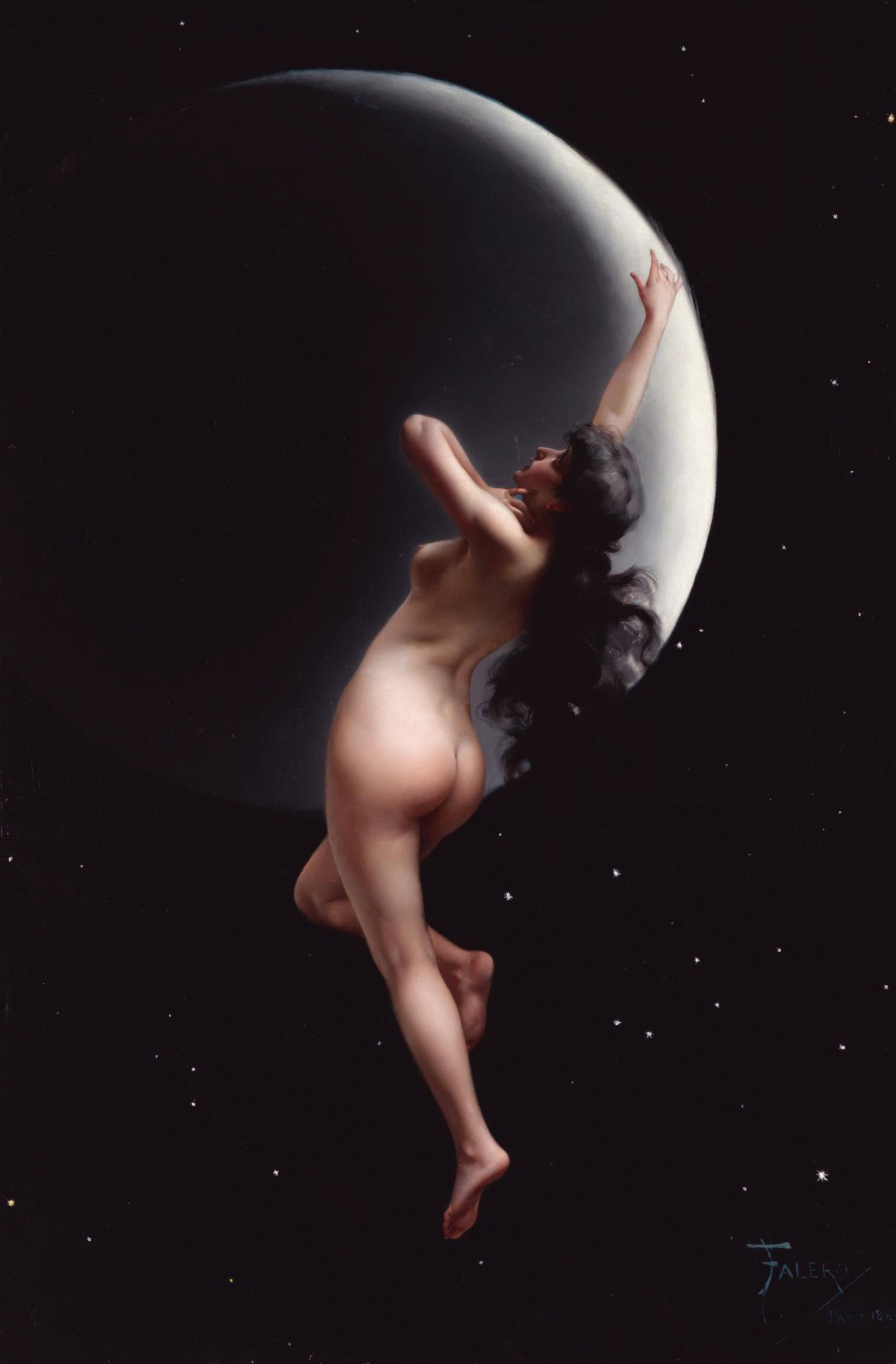
Moon Nymph (1883)

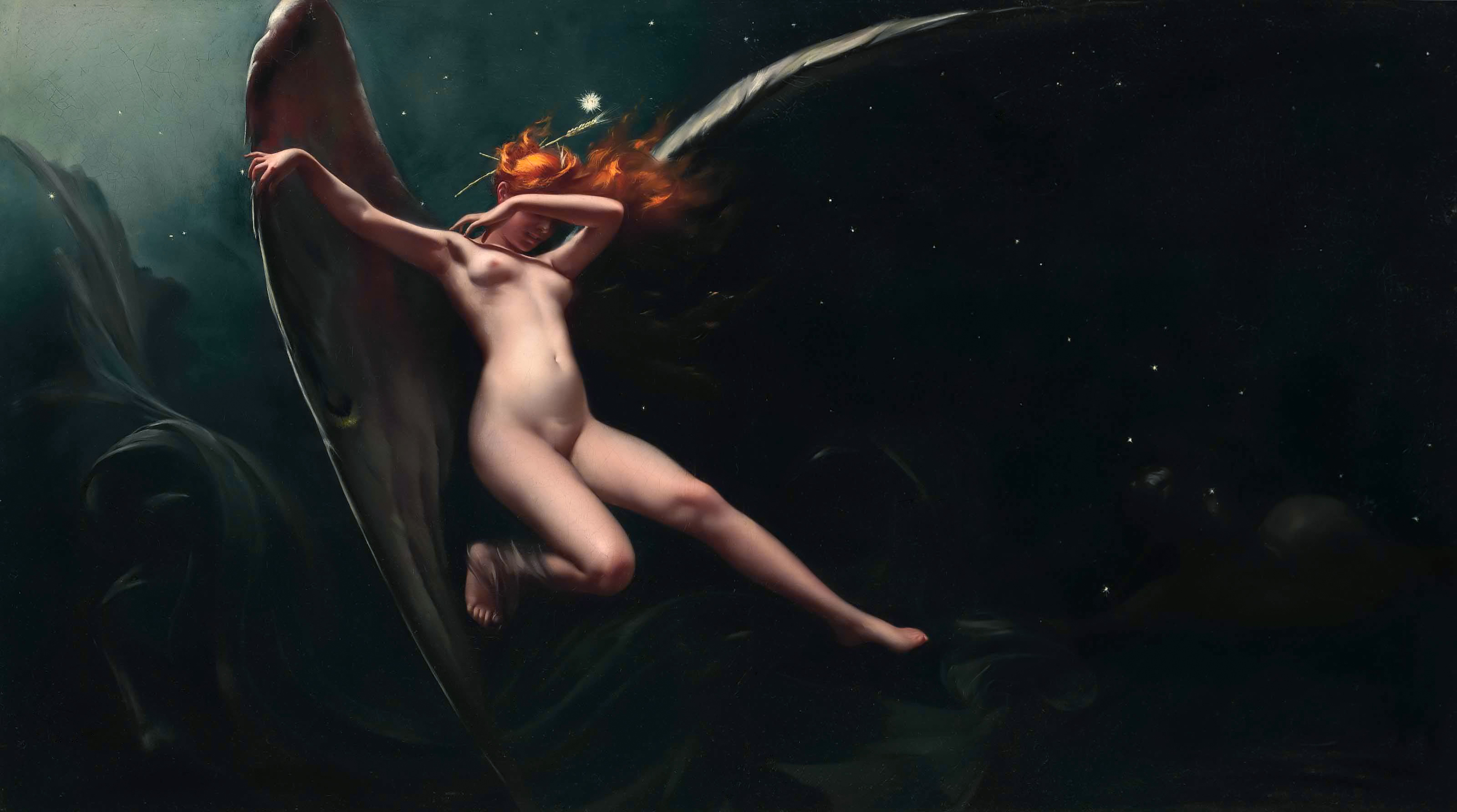
Fairy Under Starry Skies

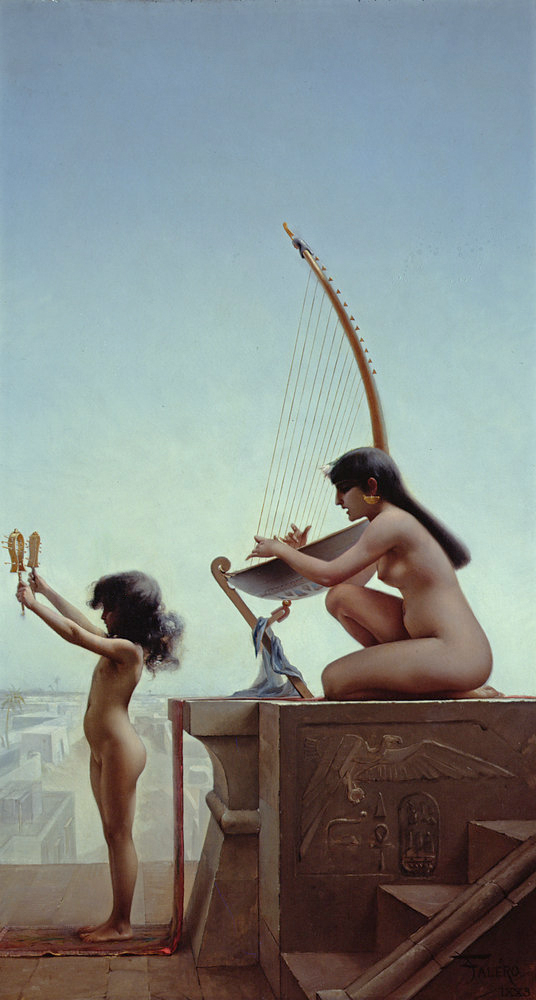
Prayer to Isis (1883)

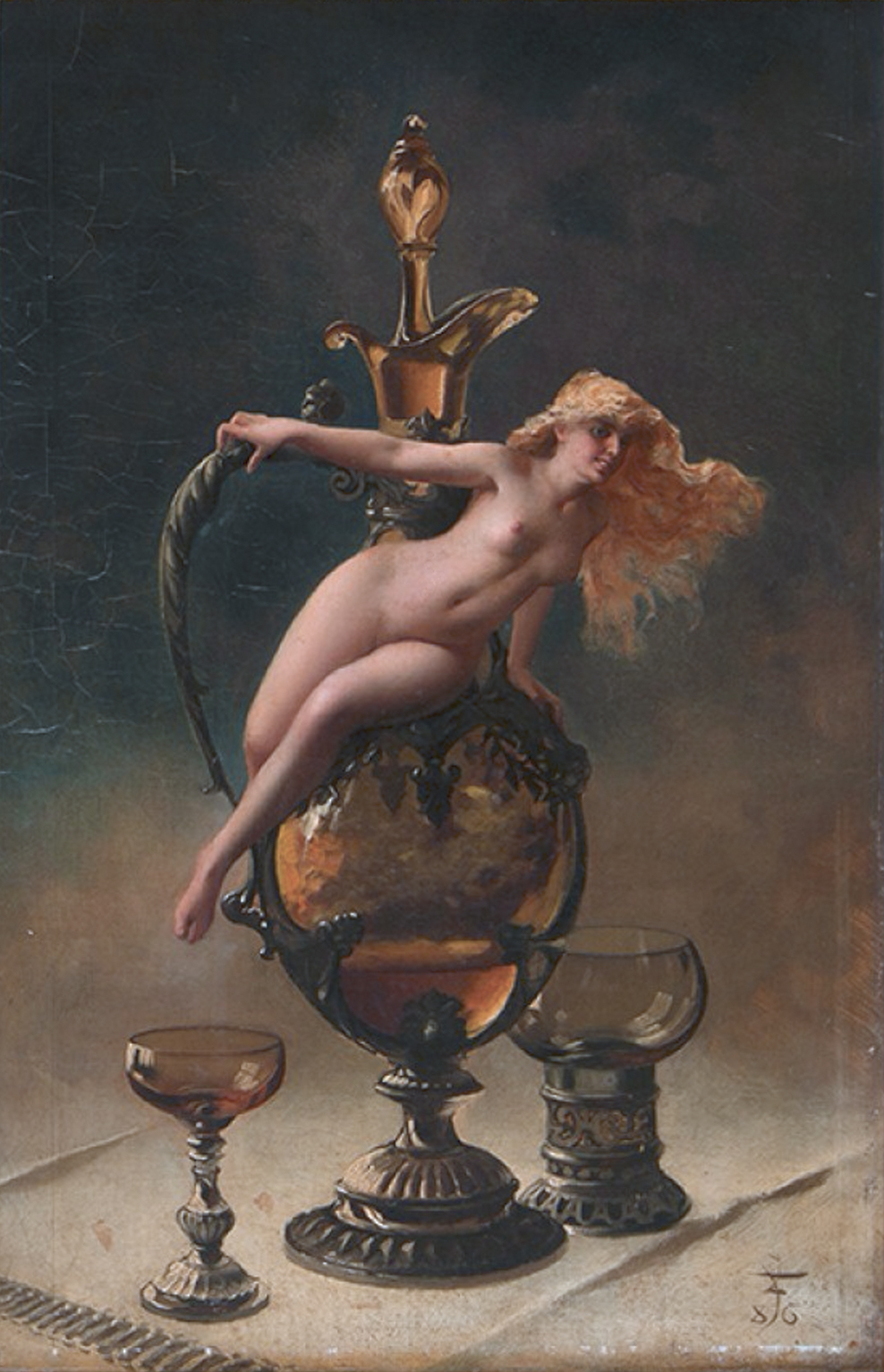
The Wine of Tokay (1886)

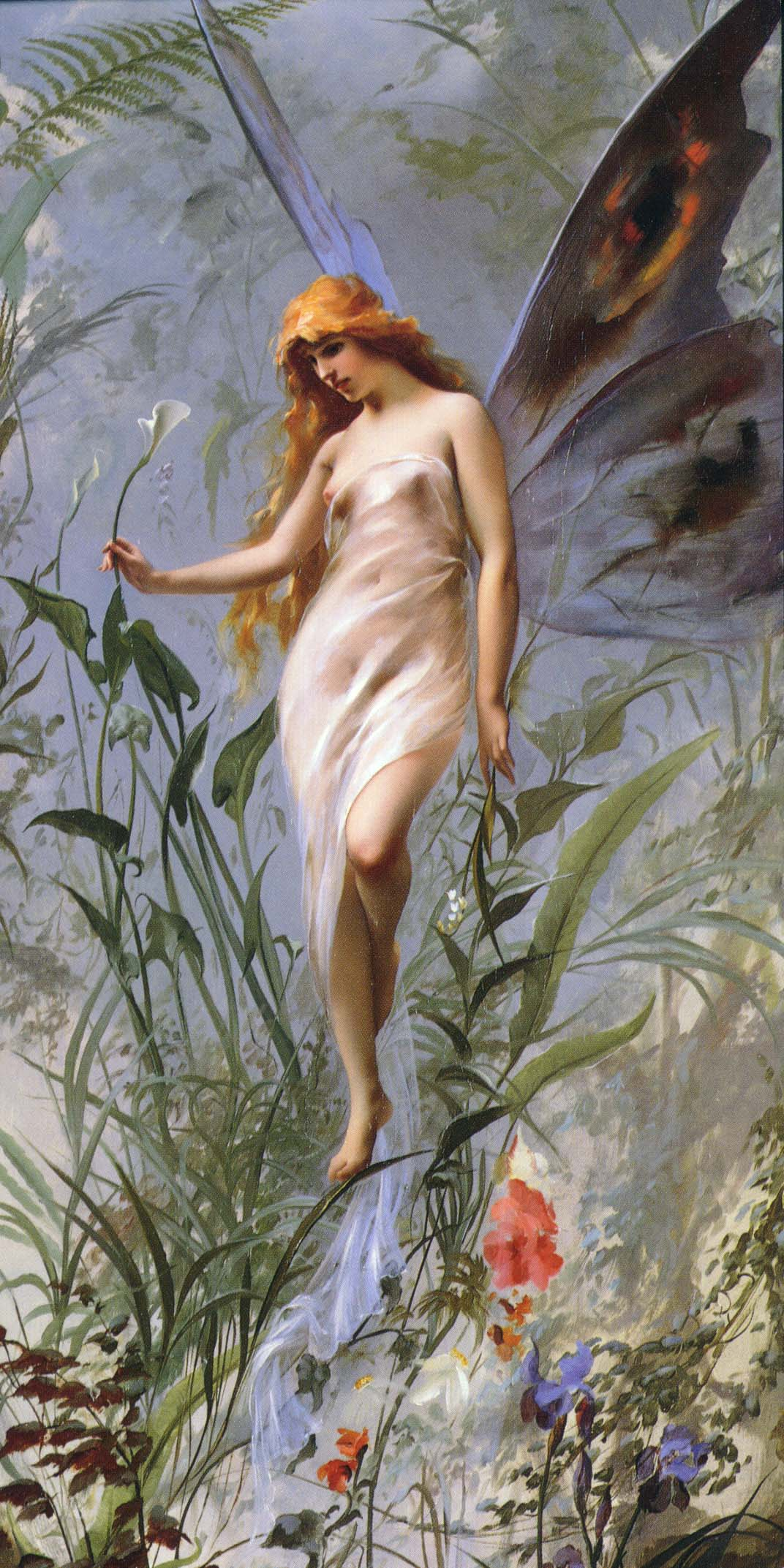
Lily Fairy (1888)

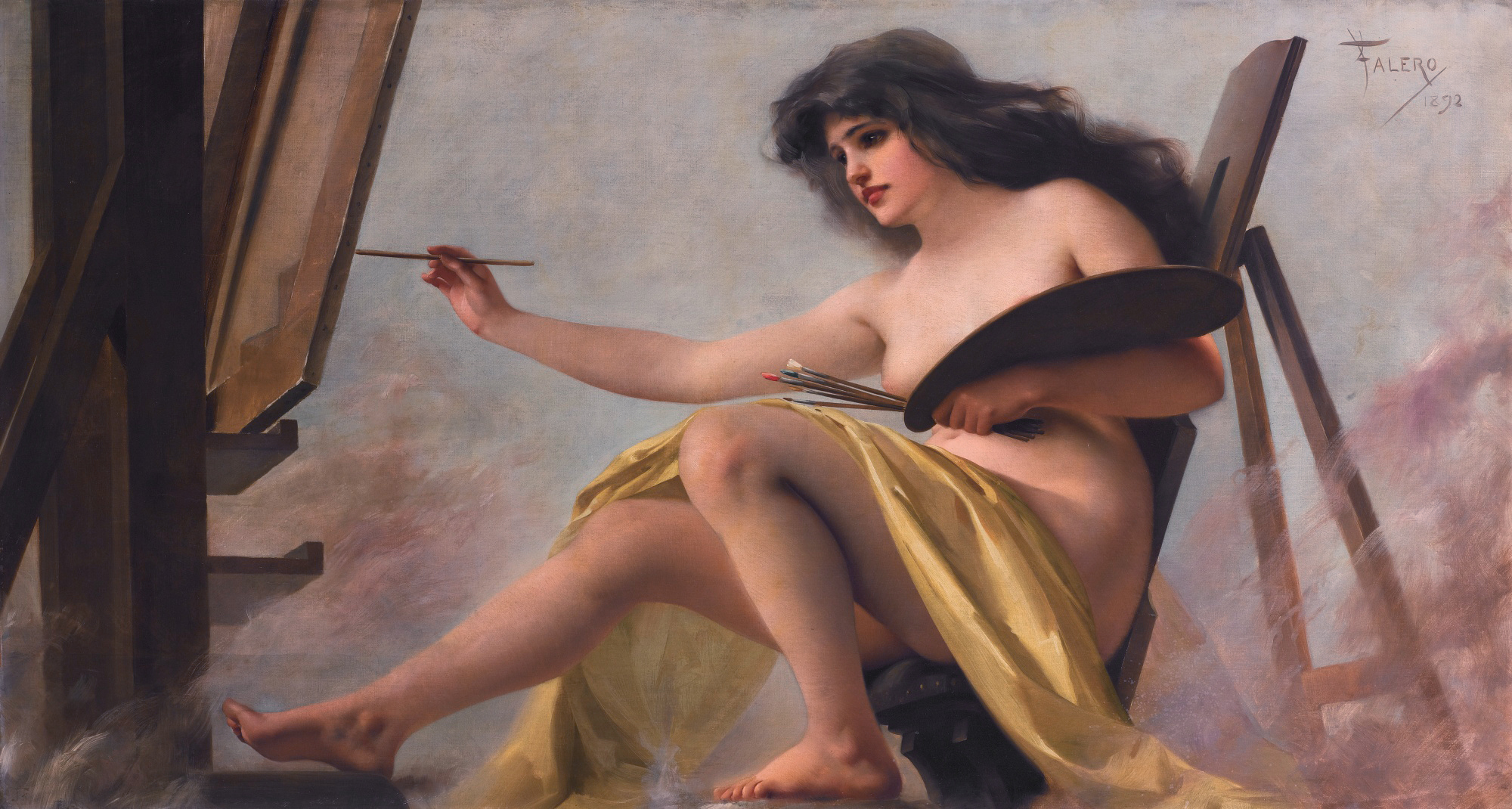
An allegory of art (1892)

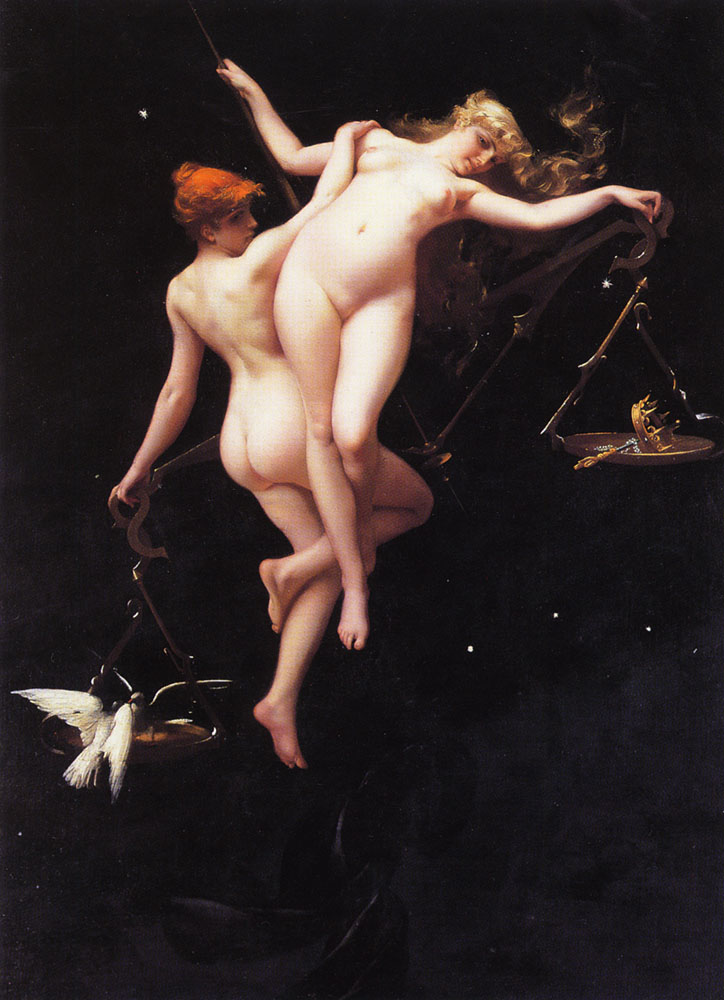
The Balance of the Zodiac

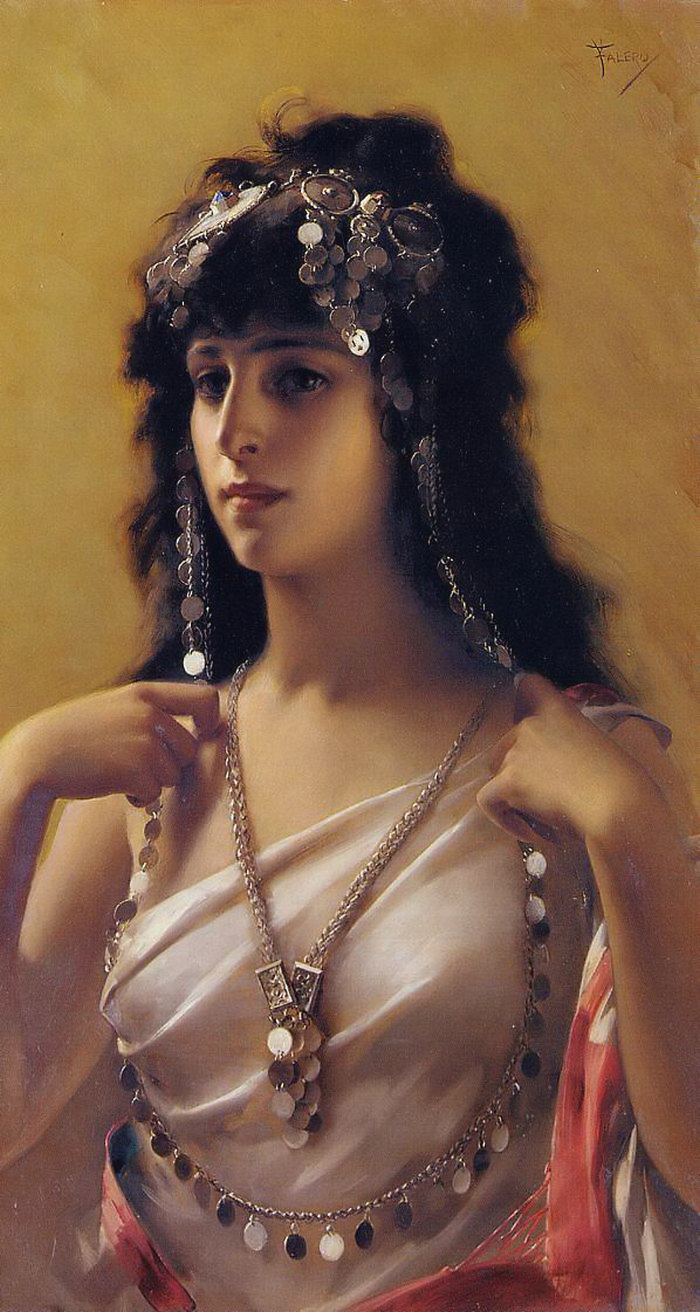
Oriental Beauty

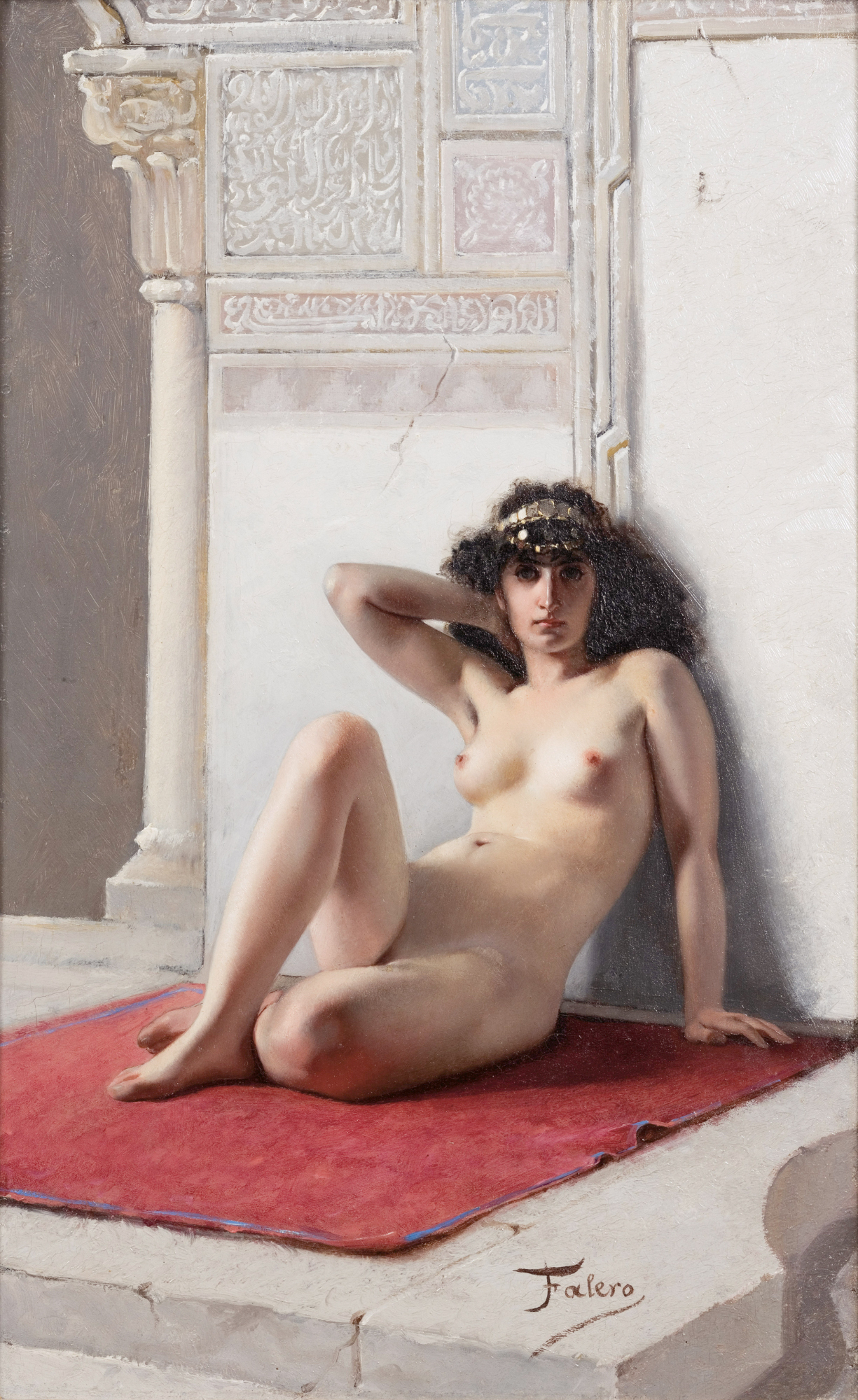
The Favorite

== Sources ==
- Eduardo Dizy Caso (1997) Les orientalistes de l'École Espagnole. Paris: ACR Édition Internationale. pp. 96–97
