= Criminal (band) =

Chilean thrash/death metal band

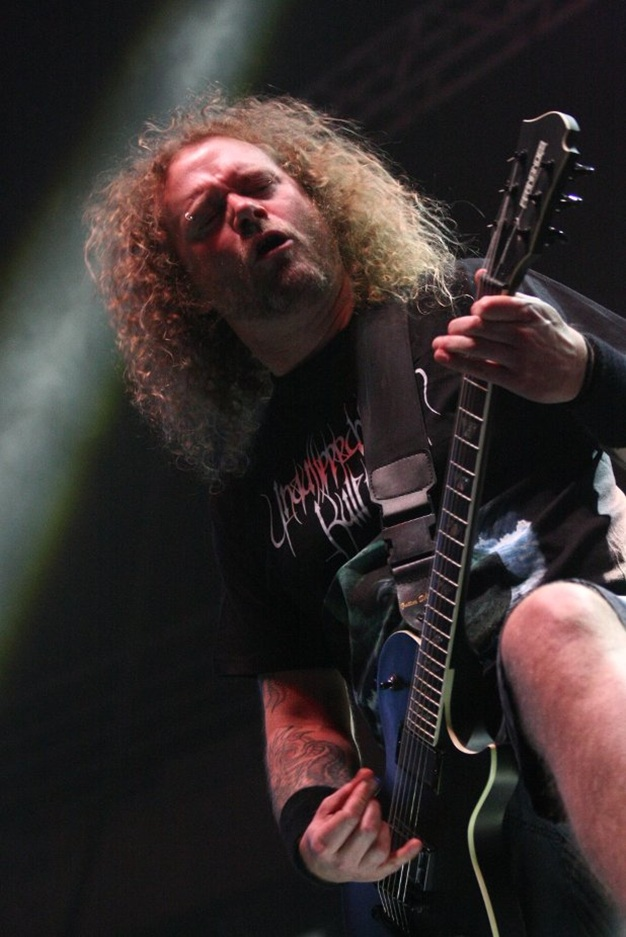

Background information
- Origin: Santiago, Chile
- Genres: Thrash metal; death metal; groove metal
- Years active: 1991–present
- Labels: Inferno Records, Metal Blade, Massacre Records
- Members: Anton Reisenegger; Sergio Klein; Dan Biggin; Zac O´Neil
- Past members: Robin Eaglestone; Juan Francisco Cueto; Staff Glover; Mark Royce; José Joaquín Vallejos; Jimmy Ponce; Olmo Cascallar
- Website: criminal1.com

Criminal is a Chilean thrash metal/death metal band that Anton Reisenegger (guitar and vocals) and Rodrigo Contreras (lead guitar) formed in late 1991 in Santiago. Drummer J.J. Vallejo and bassist Juan Francisco Cueto joined them to complete the original lineup. The band incorporates thrash metal, death metal, groove metal and hardcore. They later moved to Colchester, England.

The band received international attention with their second studio album, Dead Soul, released in 1997. Their next release, Sicario, established them as a known band in Europe and received good reviews.

Criminal have released eight studio albums, two live albums, and two demos.

== History ==
In late 1991, Reisenegger Anton joined Rodrigo Contreras to start the thrash metal band Criminal. Anton was known in the local underground scene and had received recognition by bands like Napalm Death and Dismember. The latter band had played with Contreras before.

Their debut show was in April 1992, opening for Kreator. That same year, they released two demos that got wide distribution in the local scene. Their second demo, Forked, received good reviews by international heavy metal magazines like Metal Hammer in Holanda.

In 1994, they independently recorded their first album, Victimized, and sold 1000 copies in three weeks of its release. The album got the attention of the major BMG label. The album was distributed in countries like Mexico, Argentina and Japan. The videos of Self Destruction and Disorder were frequently broadcast on MTV Latin America on the Head Bangers show, rapidly gaining reputation internationally. After that, they made their first appearance outside their country, in Buenos Aires, Argentina and Montevideo. In 1995, they played at the Festival of Latin American Metal in Guadalajara, Mexico. After this show J.J. Vallejo was replaced by Jimmy Ponce, drummer of Slavery.

In 1996, the group opened shows for Bruce Dickinson and Motörhead, also releasing the EP Live Disorder.

In 1997, they released Dead Soul, which is held in high regard by fans and critics alike. The album was released in the United States and Europe. They collaborated with Exodus and Napalm Death for the release-show of the album.

In late 1998, they released the compilation album Live Slave Master which has both studio and live performances, and the demo songs from Forked.

In early 2000, Reisenegger and Contreras began producing the third album, Cancer. The album was heavily criticized by fans as they had a shift in their music style, the album being labeled as a commercial record and far from the aggressive style of their early albums. However, the album was well received in Europe.

The 2001, Reisenegger moved to England and met the lead singer of Extreme Noise Terror, which he would join as a guitarist for their tour the following year. It was here that here would get to know a member of that band, Zac O'Neil (drums), who would lead him to undertake other musical directions. Anton showed him Criminal material to convince the drummer to continue the project. Zac already had planned to form a band with bassist Robin Eaglestone (ex Cradle of Filth) and keyboardist Mark Royce (from Entwined). Both immediately accepted the Chilean's idea, meaning that Jimmy Ponce and Juan Francisco Cueto were no longer in the band.

Regarding the internationalization of the band and their settlement in England, Anton said the following in an interview in Chile:

I honestly think that if we had been in Chile we would no longer exist. If you don't see results and you begin to start doing the same thing, people get bored of you too. It makes no sense. That was our situation, but I think that anyone, if he gets into a certain routine, in the end he gets frustrated and has no motivation."

With these new members he started a tour in Europe, one of the highlights was a performance at the Wacken Open Air festival in Germany. Due to internal problems, Anton Reisenegger and Robin Eaglestone suffered personal differences before "No Gods No Masters" was completed, Robin was ejected from the band.

No Gods No Masters was released in Europe on 23 February 2004 in Springvale Studios in Suffolk, United Kingdom. The name was inspired by one of the anarchist movements. The bass parts were improvised by the guitarists of the band. In subsequent tours they were rejoined by band's original bassist and founder: Juan Francisco Cueto. With this began a new tour, including a mini tour of Chile.

Soon the band began work on a new album which was released in 2005 under the name Minion. This was recorded at Stage One Studios in Borgentreich, Germany and was voted one of the ten best albums of 2005 by Terrorizer magazine. The sound of the album returned to the simplicity and power of their riffs. The graphic design on the album cover was provided by Claudio Bergamin, who had participated in the design of No Gods No Masters.

Despite the success of the tours Criminal again made a lineup change. Cueto decided to retire, giving way to Glover Staff who had played with the band on tour with Six Feet Under. Nevertheless, due to the abrupt departure of Glover it was Dan Biggin who played with the band on the final shows of the tour.

In 2006 and 2007, the band continued to promote the new album.

Criminal opened for Megadeth in their tour through Chile in 2008.

In early 2009, the band ventured on the acclaimed White Hell Tour where they were promoting their latest album called White Hell.

On 26 January 2010, the band opened for Metallica at the Santiago Equestrian Club.

Despite the stability that had the group among its members, during a European tour fans noticed the absence of a signature member of the quartet, Rodrigo Contreras. His replacement was Olmo Cascallar who hails from the Basque band Gamora. In respect, Anton Reisenegger issued the following statement on his website:

I know that a lot of you are a little confused by the absence of Rodrigo during these concerts, so I think that it would be better to tell you what the situation is. Rod has decided to go back to Chile for now to take care of some personal issues and business. We hope that this is a temporary situation and that he'll come right back, but right now the future is sort of uncertain.

On the band's eighth album Fear Itself, Cascallar was replaced by Sergio Klein.

== Discography ==
=== Demos ===
- Demo (1992)
- Forked Demo (1992)

=== Albums ===
- Victimized (1994)
- Dead Soul (1997)
- Cancer (2000)
- No Gods No Masters (2004)
- Sicario (2005)
- White Hell (2009)
- Akelarre (2011)
- Fear Itself (2016)
- Sacrificio (2021)

=== EPs ===
- Live Disorder (1996)

=== Live albums ===
- Slave Master Live (1998)

== Band members ==
=== Current members ===
- Anton Reisenegger – vocals, guitar
- Sergio Klein – lead guitar
- Danilo Estrella – drums
- Dan Biggin – bass

=== Former members ===
- Rodrigo Contreras – guitar
- Juan Francisco "Cato" Cueto – bass
- J.J Vallejo – drums
- Jimmy Ponce – drums
- Robin Eaglestone – bass
- Staff Glover – bass
- Aldo Celle – bass
- Olmo Cascallar – guitar
- Zac O'Neil – drums
