= The Court-Martial of Billy Mitchell =

1955 film by Otto Preminger

- Theatrical release poster
- Directed by: Otto Preminger
- Written by: Milton Sperling; Emmet Lavery; Dalton Trumbo (uncredited); Michael Wilson (uncredited); Ben Hecht (uncredited)
- Based on: Life of Billy Mitchell
- Produced by: Milton Sperling
- Starring: Gary Cooper
- Cinematography: Sam Leavitt
- Edited by: Folmar Blangsted
- Music by: Dimitri Tiomkin
- Color process: Warnercolor
- Production company: United States Pictures
- Distributed by: Warner Bros. Pictures
- Release date: December 31, 1955
- Running time: 100 minutes
- Country: United States
- Language: English
- Box office: $3 million (US)

The Court-Martial of Billy Mitchell is a 1955 American CinemaScope biographical drama film directed by Otto Preminger, and starring Gary Cooper and co-starring Charles Bickford, Ralph Bellamy, Rod Steiger, and Elizabeth Montgomery in her film debut. The film is based on the 1925 court-martial of General Billy Mitchell, who is considered a founding figure of the U.S. Air Force. During the 28th Academy Awards, it received a nomination for Best Story and Screenplay for Milton Sperling and Emmet Lavery. The award, however, went to Interrupted Melody (William Ludwig and Sonya Levien).

== Plot ==
Brigadier General William "Billy" Mitchell tries to prove the worth of the Air Service as an independent service by sinking a battleship under restrictive conditions agreed to by the Army and Navy. He disobeys their orders to limit the attack to bombs under 1,000 pounds from an altitude of greater than 5,000 ft. and instead loads 2,000-pounders. With these, Mitchell directs his aircraft to fly at 1,500 ft. and proves he can sink the ex-German World War I battleship Ostfriesland, previously considered unsinkable. His superiors are outraged.

Mitchell is demoted to colonel and sent to a ground unit in Texas. A high-profile air disaster occurs in which his close friend Zachary Lansdowne is killed in the crash of the dirigible USS Shenandoah. This is followed by a second disaster in which six aircraft crash after flying from a base on the California coast to Fort Huachuca, Arizona. They were poorly maintained because of lack of funds.

Mitchell is outraged by the tragedy and calls a press conference in which he harshly accuses the Army and Navy of criminal negligence and almost treasonable disregard of the air service. This results in a court martial in Washington, D.C. He is represented by his friend, Illinois Congressman Frank R. Reid, an advocate of air power in Congress. None of the officers hearing the case, among them General Douglas MacArthur, are in the Air Corps. Reid makes little headway. His request to call witnesses on the merits of Mitchell's position is denied. He asks who preferred the charges against Mitchell, and receiving no clear answer he demands the appearance as a witness of President Calvin Coolidge as commander of the armed forces. The court adjourns to consider the request.

Mitchell refuses to sign a paper Reid has presented him in which he withdraws his criticisms in return for saving his career as an Army officer. Margaret Lansdowne, widow of Mitchell's dead friend from the Shenandoah, then appears in court. Coolidge declines to appear, but witnesses on air power previously excluded are now allowed to testify to corroborate Mitchell's criticisms, including Eddie Rickenbacker, Carl Spaatz, Henry H. Arnold and Fiorello LaGuardia.

Finally Mitchell testifies and is cross-examined by Maj. Allen W. Gullion, a prosecutor specially brought in for the job. He stresses that Mitchell had disobeyed his superior officers. Gullion also ridicules Mitchell's claim that at some point in the future Japan will attack the U.S. Navy at Pearl Harbor.

The court finds Mitchell guilty and suspends him from rank, command, and duty for five years. The men of the air service stand to attention as he departs the Army and Navy Club in civilian dress. On hearing the sound of biplanes, Mitchell looks up at them. Footage of biplanes dissolves into footage of modern jet fighters, followed by footage of a flypast that demonstrates U.S. air power as envisioned by Billy Mitchell.

== Cast ==
- Gary Cooper as Col. Billy Mitchell
- Charles Bickford as Maj. Gen. Jimmy Guthrie (based upon Maj. General Charles Pelot Summerall and Maj. General Robert Lee Howze)
- Ralph Bellamy as Congressman Frank R. Reid
- Rod Steiger as Maj. Allen W. Gullion
- Elizabeth Montgomery as Mrs. Margaret Lansdowne
- Fred Clark as Col. Sherman Moreland
- James Daly as Lt. Col. Herbert White
- Jack Lord as Lt. Cmdr. Zachary Lansdowne
- Peter Graves as Capt. Bob Elliott
- Darren McGavin as Capt. Russ Peters
- Robert Simon as Adm. Gage
- Charles Dingle as Unnamed US Senator
- Dayton Lummis as General Douglas MacArthur
- Tom McKee as Capt. Eddie Rickenbacker
- Stephen Roberts as Major Carl Spaatz
- Herbert Heyes as General John J. Pershing
- Robert Brubaker as Major H. H. Arnold
- Phil Arnold as Fiorello LaGuardia
- Ian Wolfe as President Calvin Coolidge
- Will Wright as Admiral William S. Sims

== Production ==
Producer and screenwriter Milton Sperling began work on Mitchell's story in 1938, just two years after the general's death. In the years that followed, he continued to seek out help from Mitchell's family until 1955 when production began in earnest. Under the direction of Otto Preminger, the first 10 days of principal photography took place on location in Washington, D.C. in the original sites involved in the story. The old War Department Building, Army-Navy Club and State Department buildings, among others, were featured in key scenes.

Aerial sequences under the direction of second unit director Russ Saunders and aerial coordinator Paul Mantz took place at the Fletcher Airport in Rosamond, California. The aircraft that were used in the film included two Curtiss JN-4 biplanes, de Havilland DH-4, Grumman J2F Duck and Waco 10 biplanes.

== Reception ==
The Court-Martial of Billy Mitchell had its national premiere in New York City on December 22, 1955, as the main feature along with the short 24 Hour Alert. The films were subsequently paired with the longer feature shown first in major cities. When The Court-Martial of Billy Mitchell was released, Mitchell's sister Ruth, who served in World War II with Yugoslavian Chetnik guerrillas and later wrote a book about her brother, toured the U.S. doing publicity for the film. (Note: A "gala" premiere was held on December 14, 1955, at the Liberty and Weller Theaters in Zanesville, Ohio, near the site of the USS Shenandoah crash.)

== See also ==
- List of American films of 1955
