= John Gray (American Revolutionary War soldier) =

Continental Army veteran

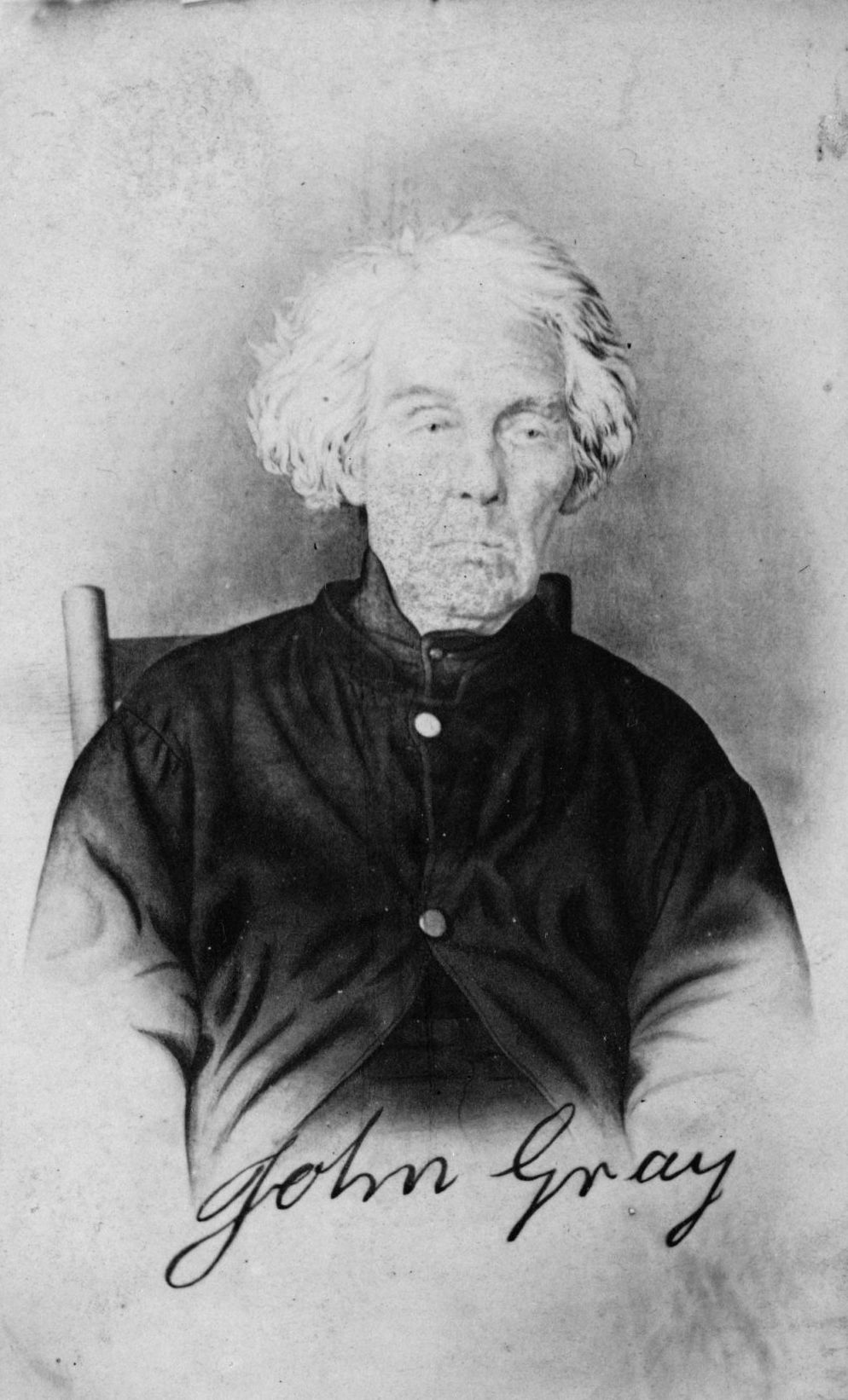
- Gray c. 1860s
- Born: January 6, 1764; Fairfax County, Colony of Virginia, British America
- Died: March 29, 1868 (aged 104); Noble County, Ohio, U.S.
- Burial place: McElroy Family Cemetery, Hiramsburg, Ohio, U.S.
- Military career
- Allegiance: United States
- Branch: Continental Army
- Service years: 1780–1781 (six months)
- Rank: Private
- Units: Virginia militia
- Conflicts: American Revolutionary War; Siege of Yorktown

John Gray (January 6, 1764 – March 29, 1868) was an American soldier and veteran of the American Revolutionary War. He was recognized by the United States government as a veteran of the war and received a pension under an act of Congress passed in 1866. Following the death of Samuel Downing in 1867, Gray was believed by the Bureau of Pensions to be the last surviving Revolutionary War veteran.

Gray was born near Mount Vernon in Virginia and joined the Virginia militia in 1780 at the age of 16. He was present at the Siege of Yorktown during the final campaign of the Revolutionary War. After the war, he moved to the Northwest Territory and eventually settled in Noble County, Ohio, where he spent most of his later life. His life and military service were later described in a biography by journalist and attorney James McCormick Dalzell, published in 1868.

== Legacy ==
His claim to the "last surviving veteran" of the War depends primarily on the failure of his competitors Daniel F. Bakeman and George Fruits (the former died a year later and the latter died several years after him) to prove service during the war. Samuel Downing and Gray had been granted pensions, by special act of the U.S. Congress (in February 1867, retroactive to June 1, 1866). The special act was required because the two had not previously applied for pensions or service land grants. Bakeman was unable to prove his service; Gray, while able to prove his service, had only served six months; Fruits had never had any pension.

A memorial to Gray is located along State Route 821 in Noble County's Noble Township.
