= List of Alpha Phi Sigma chapters =

Alpha Phi Sigma is an international criminal justice honor society. The society was established at Washington State University in January 1942. It is a member of the Association of College Honor Societies. Following are the chapters of Alpha Phi Sigma, with active chapters in bold and inactive chapters in italics.

Chapter	Charter date	Institution	Location	State, territory, or province	Status	Ref.
**Alpha**	January 1942	Washington State University	Pullman, Washington	WA	Active	
**Beta**		Michigan State University	East Lansing, Michigan	MI	Active	
**Gamma**		University of Central Missouri	Warrensburg, Missouri	MO	Active	
Delta		Northern Arizona University	Flagstaff, Arizona	AZ	Inactive	
**Epsilon**		Eastern Kentucky University	Richmond, Kentucky	KY	Active	
Zeta		University of Dayton	Dayton, Ohio	OH	Inactive	
**Eta**		University of Nebraska–Lincoln	Lincoln, Nebraska	NE	Active	
**Theta**		Texas State University	San Marcos, Texas	TX	Active	
**Iota**		San Jose State University	San Jose, California	CA	Active	
**Kappa**		University of South Alabama	Mobile, Alabama	AL	Active	
**Lambda**		York College of Pennsylvania	Spring Garden Township, Pennsylvania	PA	Active	
Mu					Inactive ?	
Nu		University of Alabama at Birmingham	Birmingham, Alabama	AL	Inactive	
**Xi**		University of South Carolina	Columbia, South Carolina	SC	Active	
**Omicron**		University of Louisville	Louisville, Kentucky	KY	Active	
**Pi**		Shippensburg University of Pennsylvania	Shippensburg, Pennsylvania	PA	Active	
Rho		University of Nevada, Reno	Reno, Nevada	NV	Inactive	
**Sigma**		University of South Florida	Tampa, Florida	FL	Active	
**Tau**		Truman State University	Kirksville, Missouri	MO	Active	
**Upsilon**		Mercyhurst University	Erie, Pennsylvania	PA	Active	
**Phi**		Sam Houston State University	Huntsville, Texas	TX	Active	
**Chi**		Illinois State University	Normal, Illinois	IL	Active	
**Psi**		Kent State University	Kent, Ohio	OH	Active	
**Omega**		Midwestern State University	Wichita Falls, Texas	TX	Active	
**Alpha Alpha**		Roger Williams University	Bristol, Rhode Island	RI	Active	
Alpha Beta					Inactive ?	
**Alpha Gamma**		American University	Washington, D.C.	DC	Active	
**Alpha Delta**		American International College	Springfield, Massachusetts	MA	Active	
Alpha Epsilon		Texas Woman's University	Denton, Texas	TX	Inactive	
Alpha Zeta					Inactive ?	
**Alpha Eta**		Indiana University of Pennsylvania	Indiana, Pennsylvania	PA	Active	
Alpha Theta					Inactive ?	
**Alpha Iota**		Southern Illinois University Carbondale	Carbondale, Illinois	IL	Active	
**Alpha Kappa**		Boise State University	Boise, Idaho	ID	Active	
Alpha Lambda					Inactive ?	
**Alpha Mu**		University of Tennessee at Chattanooga	Chattanooga, Tennessee	TN	Active	
Alpha Nu		Governors State University	University Park, Illinois	IL	Inactive	
**Alpha Xi**		Florida State University	Tallahassee, Florida	FL	Active	
**Alpha Omicron**		Indiana State University	Terre Haute, Indiana	IN	Active	
**Alpha Pi**		Texas Christian University	Fort Worth, Texas	TX	Active	
**Alpha Rho**		University of Alabama	Tuscaloosa, Alabama	AL	Active	
**Alpha Sigma**		Indiana University Northwest	Gary, Indiana	IN	Active	
**Alpha Tau**		University of New Haven	West Haven, Connecticut	CT	Active	
**Alpha Upsilon**		Ashland University	Ashland, Ohio	OH	Active	
**Alpha Phi**		University of Houston–Downtown	Houston, Texas	TX	Active	
Alpha Chi					Inactive ?	
**Alpha Psi**		Grand Valley State University	Allendale, Michigan	MI	Active	
**Alpha Omega**		East Tennessee State University	Johnson City, Tennessee	TN	Active	
**Beta Alpha**		Caldwell University	Caldwell, New Jersey	NJ	Active	
**Beta Beta**		West Virginia State University	Institute, West Virginia	WV	Active	
Beta Gamma					Inactive ?	
**Beta Delta**		Auburn University at Montgomery	Montgomery, Alabama	AL	Active	
**Beta Epsilon**		Thomas University	Thomasville, Georgia	GA	Active	
**Beta Zeta**		Utica University	Utica, New York	NY	Active	
Beta Eta					Inactive	
**Beta Theta**		University of Miami	Coral Gables, Florida	FL	Active	
Beta Iota					Inactive	
**Beta Kappa**		Indiana University Bloomington	Bloomington, Indiana	IN	Active	
**Beta Lambda**		Southern Utah University	Cedar City, Utah	UT	Active	
Beta Mu		Methodist University	Fayetteville, North Carolina	NC	Inactive	
**Beta Nu**		University of Wisconsin–Oshkosh	Oshkosh, Wisconsin	WI	Active	
Beta Xi					Inactive	
**Beta Omicron**		Loyola University Chicago	Chicago, Illinois	IL	Active	
**Beta Pi**		Endicott College	Beverly, Massachusetts	MA	Active	
Beta Rho					Inactive ?	
**Beta Sigma**		Charleston Southern University	North Charleston, South Carolina	SC	Active	
**Beta Tau**		Cumberland University	Lebanon, Tennessee	TN	Active	
**Beta Upsilon**		Campbell University	Buies Creek, North Carolina	NC	Active	
Beta Phi		Florida Atlantic University	Boca Raton, Florida	FL	Inactive	
Beta Chi					Inactive ?	
Beta Psi					Inactive ?	
**Beta Omega**		University of North Georgia	Dahlonega, Georgia	GA	Active	
**Gamma Alpha**		Lycoming College	Williamsport, Pennsylvania	PA	Active	
**Gamma Beta**		Saint Louis University	St. Louis, Missouri	MO	Active	
Gamma Gamma					Inactive ?	
Gamma Delta		Virginia Union University	Richmond, Virginia	VA	Inactive	
**Gamma Epsilon**		University of North Alabama	Florence, Alabama	AL	Active	
Gamma Zeta		Drury University	Springfield, Missouri	MO	Inactive	
**Gamma Eta**		Penn State Altoona	Logan Township, Pennsylvania	PA	Active	
**Gamma Theta**		Canisius University	Buffalo, New York	NY	Active	
Gamma Iota					Inactive ?	
Gamma Kappa					Inactive ?	
**Gamma Lambda**		Salve Regina University	Newport, Rhode Island	RI	Active	
**Gamma Mu**		Rutgers University–Newark	Newark, New Jersey	NJ	Active	
**Gamma Nu**		Alvernia University	Reading, Pennsylvania	PA	Active	
**Gamma Xi**	2001	High Point University	High Point, North Carolina	NC	Active	
**Gamma Omicron**	2000	University of Maryland Eastern Shore	Princess Anne, Maryland	MD	Active	
**Gamma Pi**		Pittsburg State University	Pittsburg, Kansas	KS	Active	
**Gamma Rho**		California State University, Fullerton	Fullerton, California	CA	Active	
**Gamma Sigma**	2019	Glenville State University	Glenville, West Virginia	WV	Active	
**Gamma Tau**		Hampton University	Hampton, Virginia	VA	Active	
**Gamma Upsilon**		Cameron University	Lawton, Oklahoma	OK	Active	
Gamma Phi		South Carolina State University	Orangeburg, South Carolina	SC	Inactive	
**Gamma Chi**		University of Pittsburgh at Greensburg	Hempfield Township, Pennsylvania	PA	Active	
**Gamma Psi**		Suffolk University	Boston, Massachusetts	MA	Active	
Gamma Omega					Inactive ?	
**Delta Alpha**		Saint Peter's University	Jersey City, New Jersey	NJ	Active	
**Delta Beta**		Johnson & Wales University	Providence, Rhode Island	RI	Active	
Delta Gamma					Inactive ?	
Delta Delta		Delta State University	Cleveland, Mississippi	MS	Inactive	
Delta Epsilon		Our Lady of the Lake University	San Antonio, Texas	TX	Inactive	
**Delta Zeta**		University of New Hampshire	Durham, New Hampshire	NH	Active	
**Delta Eta**		The Citadel	Charleston, South Carolina	SC	Active	
Delta Theta					Inactive ?	
Delta Iota		Columbia College	Columbia, Missouri	MO	Inactive	
Delta Kappa		Mount Olive College	Mount Olive, North Carolina	NC	Inactive	
Delta Lambda					Inactive ?	
**Delta Mu**		Ohio University	Athens, Ohio	OH	Active	
**Delta Nu**		University of La Verne	La Verne, California	CA	Active	
**Delta Xi**		La Roche University	McCandless, Pennsylvania	PA	Active	
**Delta Omicron**		Capital University	Bexley, Ohio	OH	Active	
**Delta Pi**		**Columbia College**	**Columbia, South Carolina**	**SC**	**Active**	
Delta Rho					Inactive ?	
**Delta Sigma**		Wheeling University	Wheeling, West Virginia	WV	Active	
Delta Tau					Inactive ?	
**Delta Upsilon**		Kean University	Union Township, New Jersey	NJ	Active	
Delta Phi					Inactive ?	
**Delta Chi**		Marist University	Poughkeepsie, New York	NY	Active	
**Delta Psi**		University of Texas at Dallas	Richardson, Texas	TX	Active	
**Delta Omega**		Widener University	Chester, Pennsylvania	PA	Active	
**Epsilon Alpha**		Mercer University	Macon, Georgia	GA	Active	
**Epsilon Beta**		LIU Post	Brookville, New York	NY	Active	
Epsilon Gamma					Inactive ?	
Epsilon Delta					Inactive ?	
Epsilon Epsilon		Central Penn College	Summerdale, Pennsylvania	PA	Inactive	
**Epsilon Zeta**		University of Scranton	Scranton, Pennsylvania	PA	Active	
**Epsilon Eta**		Mercy University	Dobbs Ferry, New York	NY	Active	
Epsilon Theta					Inactive ?	
**Epsilon Iota**		Fairmont State University	Fairmont, West Virginia	WV	Active	
**Epsilon Kappa**		Lake Superior State University	Sault Ste. Marie, Michigan	MI	Active	
Epsilon Lambda					Inactive ?	
Epsilon Mu					Inactive ?	
**Epsilon Nu**		Rowan University	Glassboro, New Jersey	NJ	Active	
**Epsilon Xi**		Eastern Washington University	Cheney, Washington	WA	Active	
**Epsilon Omicron**		Western Illinois University	Macomb, Illinois	IL	Active	
**Epsilon Pi**		State University of New York at Brockport	Brockport, New York	NY	Active	
**Epsilon Rho**		California State University, Long Beach	Long Beach, California	CA	Active	
**Epsilon Sigma**		Buffalo State University	Buffalo, New York	NY	Active	
**Epsilon Tau**		Stephen F. Austin State University	Nacogdoches, Texas	TX	Active	
**Epsilon Upsilon**		Lamar University	Beaumont, Texas	TX	Active	
**Epsilon Phi**		Western Michigan University	Kalamazoo, Michigan	MI	Active	
**Epsilon Chi**		University of Illinois Springfield	Springfield, Illinois	IL	Active	
Epsilon Psi					Inactive ?	
**Epsilon Omega**		**University of Wyoming**	**Laramie, Wyoming**	**WY**	**Active**	
Zeta Alpha					Inactive ?	
**Zeta Beta**		Loyola University New Orleans	New Orleans, Louisiana	LA	Active	
Zeta Gamma					Inactive ?	
**Zeta Delta**		Indiana University East	Richmond, Indiana	IN	Active	
**Zeta Epsilon**		Radford University	Radford, Virginia	VA	Active	
**Zeta Zeta**		Southern Illinois University Edwardsville	Edwardsville, Illinois	IL	Active	
Zeta Eta		Holy Family University	Philadelphia, Pennsylvania	PA	Inactive	
**Zeta Theta**		St. Augustine's University	Raleigh, North Carolina	NC	Active	
**Zeta Iota**		California State University, Bakersfield	Bakersfield, California	CA	Active	
**Zeta Kappa**		Central Connecticut State University	New Britain, Connecticut	CT	Active	
**Zeta Lambda**		Molloy University	Rockville Centre, New York	NY	Active	
**Zeta Mu**		Livingstone College	Salisbury, North Carolina	NC	Active	
Zeta Nu					Inactive ?	
Zeta Xi		Hodges University	Fort Myers, Florida	FL	Inactive	
Zeta Omicron					Inactive ?	
**Zeta Pi**		Monroe University	Bronx, New York City, New York	NY	Active	
**Zeta Rho**		Lynn University	Boca Raton, Florida	FL	Active	
Zeta Sigma					Inactive ?	
**Zeta Tau**		Mississippi Valley State University	Mississippi Valley State, Mississippi	MS	Active	
**Zeta Upsilon**		University of Houston–Clear Lake	Houston, Texas	TX	Active	
**Zeta Phi**		Gannon University	Erie, Pennsylvania	PA	Active	
**Zeta Chi**		St. Edward's University	Austin, Texas	TX	Active	
Zeta Psi		Norfolk State University	Norfolk, Virginia	VA	Inactive	
**Zeta Omega**		Mitchell College	New London, Connecticut	CT	Active	
**Eta Alpha**		Point Park University	Pittsburgh, Pennsylvania	PA	Active	
**Eta Beta**		Wilmington University	New Castle, Delaware	DE	Active	
**Eta Gamma**		Virginia State University	Ettrick, Virginia	VA	Active	
Eta Delta					Inactive ?	
**Eta Epsilon**		Fayetteville State University	Fayetteville, North Carolina	NC	Active	
**Eta Zeta**		Plymouth State University	Plymouth, New Hampshire	NH	Active	
**Eta Eta**		Salem State University	Salem, Massachusetts	MA	Active	
**Eta Theta**		University of Phoenix	Phoenix, Arizona	AZ	Active	
**Eta Iota**		Drexel University	Philadelphia, Pennsylvania	PA	Active	
**Eta Kappa**		Notre Dame of Maryland University	Baltimore, Maryland	MD	Active	
**Eta Lambda**		North Carolina Central University	Durham, North Carolina	NC	Active	
**Eta Mu**		West Liberty University	West Liberty, West Virginia	WV	Active	
**Eta Nu**		University of Memphis	Memphis, Tennessee	TN	Active	
**Eta Xi**		Limestone University	Gaffney, South Carolina	SC	Active	
**Eta Omicron**		Pennsylvania Western University, California	California, Pennsylvania	PA	Active	
Eta Pi					Inactive ?	
Eta Rho					Inactive ?	
Eta Sigma		Bethune–Cookman University	Daytona Beach, Florida	FL	Active	
**Eta Tau**		University of Central Oklahoma	Edmond, Oklahoma	OK	Active	
**Eta Upsilon**		North Carolina A&T State University	Greensboro, North Carolina	NC	Active	
**Eta Phi**		John Jay College of Criminal Justice	New York City, New York	NY	Active	
**Eta Chi**		Longwood University	Farmville, Virginia	VA	Active	
**Eta Psi**	2005	San Diego State University	San Diego, California	CA	Active	
**Eta Omega**		Roanoke College	Salem, Virginia	VA	Active	
Theta Alpha		St. Joseph's College	Rensselaer, Indiana	IN	Inactive	
Theta Beta					Inactive ?	
**Theta Gamma**		Le Moyne College	DeWitt, New York	NY	Active	
**Theta Delta**		Towson University	Towson, Maryland	MD	Active	
Theta Epsilon		Kaplan University		IL	Moved	
**Theta Epsilon**		Purdue University Global	West Lafayette, Indiana	IN	Active	
Theta Zeta					Inactive ?	
Theta Eta					Inactive ?	
Theta Theta					Theta Theta	
**Theta Iota**		St. Thomas Aquinas College	Sparkill, New York	NY	Active	
**Theta Kappa**		Saint Joseph's University	Philadelphia, Pennsylvania	PA	Active	
**Theta Lambda**		University of Findlay	Findlay, Ohio	OH	Active	
**Theta Mu**		Northeastern State University	Tahlequah, Oklahoma	OK	Active	
Theta Nu		College of Saint Rose	Albany, New York	NY	Inactive	
**Theta Xi**		Eastern Kentucky University, Corbin Campus	Corbin, Kentucky	KY	Active	
**Theta Omicron**		University of Texas at San Antonio	San Antonio, Texas	TX	Active	
**Theta Pi**		Bethany College	Lindsborg, Kansas	KS	Active	
**Theta Rho**		Lasell University	Newton, Massachusetts	MA	Active	
**Theta Sigma**		Liberty University	Lynchburg, Virginia	VA	Active	
**Theta Tau**		University of Nevada, Las Vegas	Paradise, Nevada	NV	Active	
Theta Upsilon					Inactive ?	
**Theta Phi**		Husson University	Bangor, Maine	ME	Active	
**Theta Chi**		Adelphi University	Garden City, New York	NY	Active	
**Theta Psi**		Mount St. Mary's University	Emmitsburg, Maryland	MD	Active	
Theta Omega					Inactive ?	
**Iota Alpha**		Western Connecticut State University	Danbury, Connecticut	CT	Active	
**Iota Beta**		Colorado Mesa University	Grand Junction, Colorado	CO	Active	
**Iota Gamma**		Chaminade University of Honolulu	Honolulu, Hawaii	HI	Active	
Iota Delta		University of North Carolina at Pembroke	Pembroke, North Carolina	NC	Inactive	
**Iota Epsilon**		Saginaw Valley State University	University Center, Michigan	MI	Active	
**Iota Zeta**		Clark Atlanta University	Atlanta, Georgia	GA	Active	
**Iota Eta**		Albany State University	Albany, Georgia	GA	Active	
**Iota Theta**		University of North Texas	Denton, Texas	TX	Active	
**Iota Iota**		Wright State University	Fairborn, Ohio	OH	Active	
Iota Kappa		New York Institute of Technology		NY	Inactive	
**Iota Lambda**		American InterContinental University	Atlanta, Georgia	GA	Active	
**Iota Mu**		St. Francis College	Brooklyn, New York	NY	Active	
**Iota Nu**		Southeastern Louisiana University	Hammond, Louisiana	LA	Active	
**Iota Xi**		University of Nebraska at Kearney	Kearney, Nebraska	NE	Active	
**Iota Omicron**		Capella University	Minneapolis, Minnesota	MN	Active	
Iota Pi		Northcentral University		AZ	Inactive	
Iota Rho		University of Arkansas	Fayetteville, Arkansas	AR	Inactive	
**Iota Sigma**		Commonwealth University-Bloomsburg	Bloomsburg, Pennsylvania	PA	Active	
**Iota Sigma**		Commonwealth University-Lock Haven	Lock Haven, Pennsylvania	PA	Active	
**Iota Sigma**		Commonwealth University-Mansfield	Mansfield, Pennsylvania	PA	Active	
**Iota Tau**		State University of New York at Potsdam	Potsdam, New York	NY	Active	
**Iota Upsilon**		Johnson C. Smith University	Charlotte, North Carolina	NC	Active	
**Iota Phi**		Montclair State University	Montclair, New Jersey	NJ	Active	
**Iota Chi**		State University of New York at Cortland	Cortland, New York	NY	Active	
**Iota Psi**		Post University	Waterbury, Connecticut	CT	Active	
Iota Omega					Inactive ?	
**Kappa Alpha**		Kutztown University of Pennsylvania	Kutztown, Pennsylvania	PA	Active	
**Kappa Beta**		Albertus Magnus College	New Haven, Connecticut	CT	Active	
**Kappa Gamma**		Olivet Nazarene University	Bourbonnais, Illinois	IL	Active	
**Kappa Delta**		Gwynedd Mercy University	Lower Gwynedd Township, Pennsylvania	PA	Active	
**Kappa Epsilon**		University of Tennessee at Martin	Martin, Tennessee	TN	Active	
Kappa Zeta		Trinity Washington University	Washington, D.C.	DC	Inactive	
**Kappa Eta**		University of North Texas at Dallas	Dallas, Texas	TX	Active	
**Kappa Theta**		California State University, Dominguez Hills	Carson, California	CA	Active	
**Kappa Iota**		Slippery Rock University	Slippery Rock, Pennsylvania	PA	Active	
**Kappa Kappa**	November 7, 2008	American Military University / Public University	Charles Town, West Virginia	WV	Active	
**Kappa Lambda**		University of West Florida	Pensacola, Florida	FL	Active	
Kappa Mu		Indiana University South Bend	South Bend, Indiana	IN	Inactive	
Kappa Nu					Inactive ?	
**Kappa Xi**		University of Colorado Denver	Denver, Colorado	CO	Active	
Kappa Omicron					Inactive ?	
Kappa Pi					Inactive ?	
Kappa Rho					Inactive ?	
**Kappa Sigma**		Cabrini University	Radnor Township, Pennsylvania	PA	Active	
**Kappa Tau**		Xavier University	Cincinnati, Ohio	OH	Active	
**Kappa Upsilon**		Kennesaw State University	Cobb County, Georgia	GA	Active	
**Kappa Phi**		Southeast Missouri State University	Cape Girardeau, Missouri	MO	Active	
Kappa Chi		State University of New York at Farmingdale	East Farmingdale, New York	NY	Inactive	
**Kappa Psi**		Dominican University	Orangeburg, New York	NY	Active	
**Kappa Omega**		University of North Dakota	Grand Forks, North Dakota	ND	Active	
**Lambda Alpha**		Curry College	Milton, Massachusetts	MA	Active	
**Lambda Beta**		Cazenovia College	Cazenovia, New York	NY	Active	
**Lambda Gamma**		Iona University	New Rochelle, New York	NY	Active	
Lambda Delta		Sullivan University	Louisville, Kentucky	KY	Inactive	
**Lambda Epsilon**		Jackson State University	Jackson, Mississippi	MS	Active	
**Lambda Epsilon**		Missouri Southern State University	Joplin, Missouri	MO	Active	
Lambda Zeta		Mansfield University of Pennsylvania	Mansfield, Pennsylvania	PA	Inactive	
**Lambda Eta**		DeSales University	Center Valley, Pennsylvania	PA	Active	
**Lambda Theta**		Saint Leo University	St. Leo, Florida	FL	Active	
**Lambda Iota**		University of Massachusetts Boston	Boston, Massachusetts	MA	Active	
Lambda Kappa					Inactive ?	
Lambda Lambda					Inactive ?	
**Lambda Mu**		Ohio Northern University	Ada, Ohio	OH	Active	
Lambda Nu		Oklahoma City University	Oklahoma City, Oklahoma	OK	Inactive	
**Lambda Xi**		Ferrum College	Ferrum, Virginia	VA	Active	
**Lambda Omicron**		West Texas A&M University	Canyon, Texas	TX	Active	
Lambda Pi		Saint Elizabeth University	Morris County, New Jersey	NJ	Inactive	
**Lambda Rho**		Worcester State University	Worcester, Massachusetts	MA	Active	
**Lambda Sigma**		University of Colorado Colorado Springs	Colorado Springs, Colorado	CO	Active	
**Lambda Tau**		Stockton University	Galloway Township, New Jersey	NJ	Active	
**Lambda Upsilon**		Adrian College	Adrian, Michigan	MI	Active	
Lambda Phi		Buena Vista University	Storm Lake, Iowa	IA	Inactive	
Lambda Chi					Inactive ?	
**Lambda Psi**		University of Guam	Mangilao, Guam	GU	Active	
**Lambda Omega**		California State University, Fresno	Fresno, California	CA	Active	
Mu Alpha					Inactive ?	
**Mu Beta**		State University of New York at Morrisville	Morrisville, New York	NY	Active	
**Mu Gamma**		University of Arkansas at Monticello	Monticello, Arkansas	AR	Active	
**Mu Delta**		Bowie State University	Bowie, Maryland	MD	Active	
Mu Epsilon		Strayer University	Washington, D.C.	FL	Inactive	
Mu Zeta		Florida National University	Hialeah, Florida	FL	Inactive	
Mu Eta		Texas Southern University	Houston, Texas	TX	Inactive	
**Mu Theta**		Southern University at New Orleans	New Orleans, Louisiana	LA	Active	
Mu Iota					Inactive ?	
**Mu Kappa**		Nipissing University	North Bay, Ontario, Canada	ON	Active	
**Mu Lambda**		Miles College	Fairfield, Alabama	AL	Active	
**Mu Mu**		University of Missouri–Kansas City	Kansas City, Missouri	MO	Active	
**Mu Nu**		University of Maine at Presque Isle	Presque Isle, Maine	ME	Active	
Mu Xi		California State University, San Marcos	San Marcos, California	CA	Inactive	
Mu Omicron					Inactive ?	
Mu Pi		Clayton State University	Morrow, Georgia	GA	Inactive	
**Mu Rho**		University of Mississippi	Oxford, Mississippi	MS	Active	
**Mu Sigma**		Lindsey Wilson College	Columbia, Kentucky	KY	Active	
**Mu Tau**		California State University, Los Angeles	Los Angeles, California	CA	Active	
**Mu Upsilon**		Texas College	Tyler, Texas	TX	Active	
**Mu Phi**		Messiah University	Mechanicsburg, Pennsylvania	PA	Active	
**Mu Chi**		Culver–Stockton College	Canton, Missouri	MO	Active	
**Mu Psi**		Stevenson University	Owings Mills, Maryland	MD	Active	
**Mu Omega**		Minnesota State University Moorhead	Moorhead, Minnesota	MN	Active	
**Nu Alpha**		Georgia Gwinnett College	Lawrenceville, Georgia	GA	Active	
**Nu Beta**		West Chester University	West Chester, Pennsylvania	PA	Active	
**Nu Gamma**		University of Bridgeport	Bridgeport, Connecticut	CT	Active	
**Nu Delta**		St. Mary's University	San Antonio, Texas	TX	Active	
**Nu Epsilon**		Chestnut Hill College	Philadelphia, Pennsylvania	PA	Active	
**Nu Zeta**		Coppin State University	Baltimore, Maryland	MD	Active	
**Nu Eta**		State University of New York at Plattsburgh	Plattsburgh, New York	NY	Active	
**Nu Theta**		Greensboro College	Greensboro, North Carolina	NC	Active	
**Nu Iota**		Southern New Hampshire University	Manchester, New Hampshire	NH	Active	
**Nu Kappa**		Framingham State University	Framingham, Massachusetts	MA	Active	
Nu Lambda					Inactive ?	
**Nu Mu**		Boston University Metropolitan College	Boston, Massachusetts	MA	Active	
Nu Nu		University of Houston–Victoria	Victoria, Texas	TX	Inactive	
**Nu Xi**		Eastern Nazarene College	Quincy, Massachusetts	MA	Active	
**Nu Omicron**		University of Baltimore	Baltimore, Maryland	MD	Active	
Nu Pi		Franklin University	Columbus, Ohio	OH	Inactive	
Nu Rho		Strayer University, Manassas Campus	Manassas, Virginia	VA	Inactive	
**Nu Sigma**		Mary Baldwin University	Staunton, Virginia	VA	Active	
**Nu Tau**		Georgia State University	Atlanta, Georgia	GA	Active	
**Nu Upsilon**		University of Richmond	Richmond, Virginia	VA	Active	
**Nu Phi**		Florida Southern College	Lakeland, Florida	FL	Active	
Nu Chi		Purdue University Northwest	Westville, Indiana	IN	Inactive	
**Nu Psi**		Texas A&M International University	Laredo, Texas	TX	Active	
**Nu Omega**		Arkansas State University	Jonesboro, Arkansas	AR	Active	
**Xi Beta**		Carthage College	Kenosha, Wisconsin	WI	Active	
**Xi Gamma**		Fitchburg State University	Fitchburg, Massachusetts	MA	Active	
**Xi Omicron**		University of Mary Hardin–Baylor	Belton, Texas	TX	Active	
**Pi Alpha**		University of South Carolina Upstate	Valley Falls, South Carolina	SC	Active	
**Pi Beta**		Merrimack College	North Andover, Massachusetts	MA	Active	
Pi Gamma		Bethel University	McKenzie, Tennessee	TN	Inactive	
**Pi Delta**		Seattle University	Seattle, Washington	WA	Active	
Pi Epsilon		Lindenwood University – Belleville	Belleville, Illinois	IL	Inactive	
Pi Zeta		Oakland University	Auburn Hills and Rochester Hills, Michigan	MI	Inactive	
**Pi Eta**		Texas Wesleyan University	Fort Worth, Texas	TX	Active	
**Pi Theta**		California State University, Chico	Chico, California	CA	Active	
**Pi Iota**		University of Virginia's College at Wise	Wise, Virginia	VA	Active	
**Pi Kappa**		Neumann University	Aston Township, Pennsylvania	PA	Active	
Pi Lambda		Baker College, Jackson Campus	Jackson, Michigan	MI	Inactive	
**Pi Mu**		Newbury College	Brookline, Massachusetts	MA	Active	
**Pi Nu**		Utah Valley University	Orem, Utah	UT	Active	
Pi Omicron	March 31, 2015	University of Lynchburg	Lynchburg, Virginia	VA	Active	
**Pi Rho**		Aurora University	Aurora, Illinois	IL	Active	
**Pi Sigma**		Mount Aloysius College	Cresson, Pennsylvania	PA	Active	
Pi Tau		Argosy University, Denver Campus	Denver, Colorado	CO	Inactive	(Note: The university closed in 2019.)
**Pi Upsilon**		Claflin University	Orangeburg, South Carolina	SC	Active	
Pi Phi					Inactive ?	
Pi Chi					Inactive ?	
Pi Psi					Inactive ?	
**Pi Omega**		University of North Florida	Jacksonville, Florida	FL	Active	
**Sigma Alpha**		Indiana University Indianapolis	Indianapolis, Indiana	IN	Active	
**Sigma Kappa**		George Washington University	Washington, D.C.	DC	Active	
Upsilon Alpha		Roosevelt University	Chicago, Illinois	IL	Inactive	
Upsilon Beta		Brigham Young University	Provo, Utah	ID	Inactive	
**Upsilon Gamma**		National University	San Diego, California	CA	Active	
**Phi Alpha**		Nichols College	Dudley, Massachusetts	MA	Active	
**Phi Beta**		University of Indianapolis	Indianapolis, Indiana	IN	Active	
**Phi Gamma**		Harris–Stowe State University	St. Louis, Missouri	MO	Active	
**Phi Delta**		Anna Maria College	Paxton, Massachusetts	MA	Active	
**Phi Epsilon**		University of Guelph-Humber	Toronto, Ontario, Canada	ON	Active	
**Phi Zeta**		Regent University	Virginia Beach, Virginia	VA	Active	
**Phi Eta**		Saint Leo University Worldwide			Active	
**Phi Theta**		State University of New York at Fredonia	Fredonia, New York	NY	Active	
Phi Iota		Briarcliffe College	Long Island, New York	NY	Inactive	(Note: College closed in 2018.)
**Phi Kappa**		Austin Peay State University	Clarksville, Tennessee	TN	Active	
Phi Lambda (see Pi Zeta Gamma)		Penn State Beaver	Center Township, Pennsylvania	PA	Consolidated	
**Phi Mu**		Mississippi State University, Meridian Campus	Meridian, Mississippi	MS	Active	
**Phi Nu**		Walden University	Minneapolis, Minnesota	MN	Active	
Phi Xi					Inactive ?	
Phi Omicron					Inactive ?	
Phi Pi					Inactive ?	
Phi Rho					Inactive ?	
**Phi Sigma**		American InterContinental University, Schaumburg	Schaumburg, Illinois	IL	Active	
**Phi Tau**		Immaculata University	East Whiteland Township, Pennsylvania	PA	Active	
**Phi Upsilon**		Pace University - Pleasantville	Pleasantville, New York	NY	Active	
Phi Phi					Inactive ?	
**Phi Chi**		Saint Leo University - Savannah Education Center	Savannah, Georgia	GA	Active	
Phi Psi		National Louis University	Chicago, Illinois	IL	Inactive	
Phi Omega		Wiley University	Marshall, Texas	TX	Inactive	
**Chi Lambda**		California Lutheran University	Thousand Oaks, California	CA	Active	
**Omega Alpha**		East Carolina University	Greenville, North Carolina	NC	Active	
Omega Beta					Inactive ?	
**Omega Gamma**		Marshall University	Huntington, West Virginia	WV	Active	
**Omega Delta**		University of Arkansas - Little Rock	Little Rock, Arkansas	AR	Active	
**Omega Epsilon**		Northeastern University	Boston, Massachusetts	MA	Active	
**Omega Zeta**		Westfield State University	Westfield, Massachusetts	MA	Active	
**Omega Eta**		Youngstown State University	Youngstown, Ohio	OH	Active	
**Omega Theta**		University of North Carolina at Charlotte	Charlotte, North Carolina	NC	Active	
**Omega Iota**		University of Maryland, College Park	College Park, Maryland	MD	Active	
**Omega Kappa**		Columbus State University	Columbus, Georgia	GA	Active	
**Omega Lambda**		Texas A&M University–Central Texas	Killeen, Texas	TX	Active	
**Omega Mu**		Virginia Commonwealth University	Richmond, Virginia	VA	Active	
Omega Nu					Inactive ?	
**Omega Xi**		University of Alaska Anchorage	Anchorage, Alaska	AK	Active	
Omega Omicron					Inactive ?	
Omega Pi					Inactive ?	
**Omega Rho**		Niagara University	Lewiston, New York	NY	Active	
Omega Sigma					Inactive ?	
**Omega Tau**		Nova Southeastern University	Fort Lauderdale, Florida	FL	Active	
**Omega Upsilon**		State University of New York at Canton	Canton, New York	NY	Active	
**Omega Phi**		University of Texas Rio Grande Valley	Edinburg, Texas	TX	Active	
Omega Chi					Inactive ?	
Omega Psi		Valdosta State University	Valdosta, Georgia	GA	Inactive	
Omega Omega					Inactive ?	
**Alpha Beta Alpha**		Augusta University	Augusta, Georgia	GA	Active	(Note: Chapter was established at Georgia Regents University, now August University.)
**Alpha Delta Alpha**		Minnesota State University, Mankato	Mankato, Minnesota	MN	Active	
**Alpha Delta Gamma**		University of Wisconsin–Superior	Superior, Wisconsin	WI	Active	
**Alpha Delta Delta**		South University, Tampa Campus	Tampa, Florida	FL	Active	
**Alpha Delta Tau**		Tarleton State University	Stephenville, Texas	TX	Active	
**Alpha Epsilon Iota**		Benedict College	Columbia, South Carolina	SC	Active	
**Alpha Epsilon Kappa**		Tiffin University	Tiffin, Ohio	OH	Active	
**Alpha Epsilon Rho**		St. John's University	New York City, New York	NY	Active	
**Alpha Epsilon Omega**		North Carolina Wesleyan University	Rocky Mount, North Carolina	NC	Active	
**Alpha Zeta Alpha**		Western New Mexico University	Silver City, New Mexico	NM	Active	
**Alpha Eta Delta**		Western New England University	Springfield, Massachusetts	MA	Active	
**Alpha Iota Nu**		La Salle University	Philadelphia, Pennsylvania	PA	Active	
**Alpha Kappa Omega**		Texas A & M University	Commerce, Texas	TX	Active	
**Alpha Lambda Sigma**		King's College	Wilkes-Barre, Pennsylvania	PA	Active	
**Alpha Nu Omega**		Norwich University	Northfield, Vermont	VT	Active	
**Alpha Rho Omega**		Western Carolina University	Cullowhee, North Carolina	NC	Active	
**Alpha Sigma Alpha**		Arizona State University	Tempe, Arizona	AZ	Active	
**Alpha Chi Alpha**		New Mexico State University	Las Cruces, New Mexico	NM	Active	
Alpha Omega Alpha		Faulkner University	Montgomery, Alabama	AL	Inactive	
**Beta Alpha Alpha**		Barton College	Wilson, North Carolina	NC	Active	
**Beta Gamma Gamma**		East Central University	Ada, Oklahoma	OK	Active	
**Beta Epsilon Nu**		Prairie View A&M University	Prairie View, Texas	TX	Active	
**Beta Sigma Upsilon**		Ball State University	Muncie, Indiana	IN	Active	
**Beta Tau Nu**		Central Washington University	Ellensburg, Washington	WA	Active	
**Gamma Beta Lambda**		Grambling State University	Grambling, Louisiana	LA	Active	
**Gamma Theta Pi**		University of Cincinnati	Cincinnati, Ohio	OH	Active	
**Gamma Omega Delta**		Sacred Heart University	Fairfield, Connecticut	CT	Active	
**Delta Gamma Xi**		Metropolitan State University of Denver	Denver, Colorado	CO	Active	
**Delta Zeta Pi**		Virginia Wesleyan University	Virginia Beach, Virginia	VA	Active	
**Delta Omega Tau**		University of Massachusetts Lowell	Lowell, Massachusetts	MA	Active	
**Delta Tau Delta**		Western State College of Law	Irvine, California	CA	Active	
**Delta Phi Sigma**		The College of New Jersey	Ewing Township, New Jersey	NJ	Active	
**Epsilon Delta Chi**		Elmira College	Elmira, New York	NY	Active	
**Epsilon Eta Mu**		Alabama State University	Montgomery, Alabama	AL	Active	
Epsilon Tau Sigma		Mount Mercy University	Cedar Rapids, Iowa	IA	Inactive	
Zeta Eta Nu		Savannah State University	Savannah, Georgia	GA	Inactive	
Zeta Pi Gamma		Northern Kentucky University	Highland Heights, Kentucky	KY	Inactive	
**Iota Upsilon Kappa**		Indiana University Kokomo	Kokomo, Indiana	IN	Active	
**Theta Beta Rho**		Jacksonville State University	Jacksonville, Alabama	AL	Active	
**Kappa Gamma Delta**		University of Tampa	Tampa, Florida	FL	Active	
**Kappa Delta Epsilon**		Keiser University	Orlando, Florida	FL	Active	
**Kappa Mu Epsilon**		University of Florida	Gainesville, Florida	FL	Active	
**Kappa Omega Rho**		Pennsylvania Western University, Edinboro	Edinboro, Pennsylvania	PA	Active	
**Lambda Alpha Epsilon**		Berkeley College	Woodland Park, New Jersey	NJ	Active	
Lambda Kappa Mu		University of South Florida St. Petersburg	St. Petersburg, Florida	FL	Inactive	
**Lambda Lambda Sigma**		California State University, Sacramento	Sacramento, California	CA	Active	
**Lambda Sigma Upsilon**		Louisiana State University Shreveport	Shreveport, Louisiana	LA	Active	
**Lambda Sigma Chi**		University of Texas at Arlington	Arlington, Texas	TX	Active	
**Lambda Chi Xi**		Chowan University	Murfreesboro, North Carolina	NC	Active	
**Xi Xi Xi**		Wayne State College	Wayne, Nebraska	NE	Active	
**Omicron Delta Upsilon**		Old Dominion University	Norfolk, Virginia	VA	Active	
**Sigma Mu Sigma**	2001	Missouri State University	Springfield, Missouri	MO	Active	
**Sigma Upsilon Sigma**		University of North Carolina Wilmington	Wilmington, North Carolina	NC	Active	
**Sigma Phi Alpha**		Florida International University	University Park, Florida	FL	Active	
**Sigma Omega Upsilon**	1997	Southern Oregon University	Ashland, Oregon	OR	Active	
**Tau Sigma Upsilon**		Troy University	Troy, Alabama	AL	Active	
Upsilon Gamma Alpha		University of Georgia	Athens, Georgia	GA	Inactive	
**Chi Rho Omega**		Elizabeth City State University	Elizabeth City, North Carolina	NC	Active	
**Chi Sigma Upsilon**		Chicago State University	Chicago, Illinois	IL	Active	
**Chi Omega Pi**		Ferris State University	Big Rapids, Michigan	MI	Active	
**Chi Omega Phi**		University of West Georgia	Carrollton, Georgia	GA	Active	
**Omega Theta Phi**		Monmouth University	West Long Branch, New Jersey	NJ	Active	
**Omega Phi Delta**		Appalachian State University	Boone, North Carolina	NC	Active	
Pi Alpha Alpha					Inactive ?	
**Pi Alpha Beta**		Bay Path University	Longmeadow, Massachusetts	MA	Active	
**Pi Alpha Gamma**		Rutgers University	Piscataway, New Jersey	NJ	Active	
**Pi Alpha Delta**		University of Wisconsin–Whitewater	Whitewater, Wisconsin	WI	Active	
**Pi Alpha Epsilon**		Penn State Harrisburg	Lower Swatara Township, Pennsylvania	PA	Active	
Pi Alpha Zeta					Inactive ?	
Pi Alpha Eta		University of Hawaiʻi at West Oʻahu	Kapolei, Hawaii	HI	Inactive	
**Pi Alpha Theta**		South University, Virginia Beach Campus	Virginia Beach, Virginia	VA	Active	
Pi Alpha Iota		Strayer University, Doral Campus	Doral, Florida	FL	Inactive	
**Pi Alpha Kappa**		Fairleigh Dickinson University	Madison, New Jersey	NJ	Active	
**Pi Alpha Lambda**		Brevard College	Brevard, North Carolina	NC	Active	
**Pi Alpha Mu**		Virginia Tech	Blacksburg, Virginia	VA	Active	
**Pi Alpha Nu**		Piedmont University	Demorest, Georgia	GA	Active	
Pi Alpha Xi					Inactive ?	
**Pi Alpha Omicron**		Atlanta Metropolitan State College	Atlanta, Georgia	GA	Active	
**Pi Alpha Pi**		Lakeland University	Sheboygan, Wisconsin	WI	Active	
**Pi Alpha Rho**		William Paterson University	Wayne, New Jersey	NJ	Active	
**Pi Alpha Sigma**		Christopher Newport University	Newport News, Virginia	VA	Active	
**Pi Alpha Tau**		Fisher College	Boston, Massachusetts	MA	Active	
**Pi Alpha Upsilon**		Mount St. Joseph University	Delhi Township, Ohio	OH	Active	
Pi Alpha Phi					Inactive ?	
**Pi Alpha Chi**		East Stroudsburg University of Pennsylvania	East Stroudsburg, Pennsylvania	PA	Active	
**Pi Alpha Psi**		Flagler College	St. Augustine, Florida	FL	Active	
**Pi Alpha Omega**		Washburn University	Topeka, Kansas	KS	Active	
Pi Beta Alpha		Rutgers University–Camden	Camden, New Jersey	NJ	Inactive	
**Pi Beta Beta**		Quincy University	Quincy, Illinois	IL	Active	
**Pi Beta Gamma**		Georgian Court University	Lakewood Township, New Jersey	NJ	Active	
Pi Beta Delta		University of Missouri–St. Louis	St. Louis, Missouri	MO	Inactive	
**Pi Beta Epsilon**		University of Central Arkansas	Conway, Arkansas	AR	Active	
Pi Beta Zeta					Inactive ?	
Pi Beta Eta					Inactive ?	
**Pi Beta Theta**		Miami Dade College	Miami, Florida	FL	Active	
**Pi Beta Iota**		Indian River State College	Fort Pierce, Florida	FL	Active	
**Pi Beta Kappa**		Southeastern University	Lakeland, Florida	FL	Active	
Pi Beta Lambda					Inactive ?	
**Pi Beta Mu**		Lindenwood University	St. Charles, Missouri	MO	Active	
**Pi Beta Nu**		Georgia College & State University	Milledgeville, Georgia	GA	Active	
Pi Beta XI					Inactive ?	
**Pi Beta Omicron**		California State University, Northridge	Los Angeles, California	CA	Active	
**Pi Beta Pi**		University of Washington Tacoma	Tacoma, Washington	WA	Active	
**Pi Beta Rho**		Franklin Pierce University	Rindge, New Hampshire	NH	Active	
**Pi Beta Sigma**		Westminster College	New Wilmington, Pennsylvania	PA	Active	
**Pi Beta Tau**		University of the Cumberlands	Williamsburg, Kentucky	KY	Active	
**Pi Beta Upsilon**		Lander University	Greenwood, South Carolina	SC	Active	
**Pi Beta Phi**		University of Alaska Fairbanks	College, Alaska	AK	Active	
**Pi Beta Chi**		University of Mount Union	Alliance, Ohio	OH	Active	
**Pi Beta Psi**		Saint Vincent College	Latrobe, Pennsylvania	PA	Active	
**Pi Beta Omega**		University of Wisconsin–Platteville	Platteville, Wisconsin	WI	Active	
**Pi Gamma Alpha**		Southwestern Oklahoma State University	Sayre, Oklahoma	OK	Active	
**Pi Gamma Beta**		Rider University	Lawrence Township, New Jersey	NJ	Active	
**Pi Gamma Gamma**		Hartwick College	Oneonta, New York	NY	Active	
**Pi Gamma Delta**		University of Iowa	Iowa City, Iowa	IA	Active	
Pi Gamma Epsilon					Inactive ?	
**Pi Gamma Zeta**		Baker College, Flint Campus	Owosso, Michigan	MI	Active	
**Pi Gamma Eta**		Azusa Pacific University	Azusa, California	CA	Active	
**Pi Gamma Theta**		Southern Wesleyan University	Central, South Carolina	SC	Active	
**Pi Gamma Iota**		North Park University	Chicago, Illinois	IL	Active	
**Pi Gamma Kappa**		Ohio Christian University	Circleville, Ohio	OH	Active	
**Pi Gamma Lambda**		American InterContinental University, Houston	Houston, Texas	TX	Active	
**Pi Gamma Mu**		Penn State Berks	Spring Township, Pennsylvania	PA	Active	
**Pi Gamma Nu**		Seton Hill University	Greensburg, Pennsylvania	PA	Active	
**Pi Gamma Xi**		University of Rhode Island	Kingston, Rhode Island	RI	Active	
**Pi Gamma Omicron**		Huston–Tillotson University	Austin, Texas	TX	Active	
**Pi Gamma Pi**		Colorado State University–Global Campus	Troy, New York	NY	Active	
Pi Gamma Rho		Newberry College	Newberry, South Carolina	SC	Inactive	
**Pi Gamma Sigma**		Elmhurst University	Elmhurst, Illinois	IL	Active	
**Pi Gamma Tau**		Eastern University	St. Davids, Pennsylvania	PA	Active	
**Pi Gamma Upsilon**		Saint Martin's University	Lacey, Washington	WA	Active	
Pi Gamma Phi					Inactive ?	
Pi Gamma Chi					Inactive ?	
Pi Gamma Psi					Inactive ?	
**Pi Gamma Omega**		Campbellsville University	Campbellsville, Kentucky	KY	Active	
**Pi Delta Alpha**		University of St. Thomas	Houston, Texas	TX	Active	
**Pi Delta Beta**		Tennessee State University	Nashville, Tennessee	TN	Active	
**Pi Delta Gamma**		Randolph–Macon College	Ashland, Virginia	VA	Active	
**Pi Delta Delta**		Alabama A&M University	Normal, Alabama	AL	Active	
**Pi Delta Epsilon**		Hofstra University	Hempstead, New York	NY	Active	
**Pi Delta Zeta**		University of Pikeville	Pikeville, Kentucky	KY	Active	
**Pi Delta Eta**		College of the Ozarks	Point Lookout, Missouri	MO	Active	
**Pi Delta Theta**		Langston University	Langston, Oklahoma	OK	Active	
**Pi Delta Iota**		Dillard University	New Orleans, Louisiana	LA	Active	
**Pi Delta Kappa**		Keiser University Graduate School	Fort Lauderdale, Florida	FL	Active	
**Pi Delta Lambda**		Lancaster Bible College	Lancaster, Pennsylvania	PA	Active	
**Pi Delta Mu**		University of St. Francis	Joliet, Illinois	IL	Active	
Pi Delta Nu					Inactive ?	
**Pi Delta Xi**		Springfield College	Springfield, Massachusetts	MA	Active	
**Pi Delta Omicron**		State University of New York at Oneonta	Oneonta, New York	NY	Active	
**Pi Delta Pi**		Heidelberg University	Tiffin, Ohio	OH	Active	
**Pi Delta Rho**		Greenville University	Greenville, Illinois	IL	Active	
**Pi Delta Sigma**		Saint Xavier University	Chicago, Illinois	IL	Active	
**Pi Delta Tau**		California Baptist University	Riverside, California	CA	Active	
**Pi Delta Upsilon**		Purdue University Northwest	Hammond, Indiana	IN	Active	
**Pi Delta Phi**		Robert Morris University	Moon Township, Pennsylvania	PA	Active	
**Pi Delta Chi**		New York Institute of Technology	Old Westbury, New York	NY	Active	
**Pi Delta Psi**		Arkansas Tech University	Russellville, Arkansas	AR	Active	
**Pi Delta Omega**		Voorhees University	Denmark, South Carolina	SC	Active	
Pi Epsilon Alpha					Inactive ?	
**Pi Epsilon Beta**		Penn West Clarion	Clarion, Pennsylvania	PA	Active	
**Pi Epsilon Gamma**		DePaul University	Chicago, Illinois	IL	Active	
**Pi Epsilon Delta**		University of Akron	Akron, Ohio	OH	Active	
**Pi Epsilon Epsilon**		New England College	Henniker, New Hampshire	NH	Active	
**Pi Epsilon Zeta**		Emmanuel College	Boston, Massachusetts	MA	Active	
**Pi Epsilon Eta**	2020	Concordia University Nebraska	Seward, Nebraska	NE	Active	
**Pi Epsilon Theta**		Lewis University	Romeoville, Illinois	IL	Active	
**Pi Epsilon Iota**		St. Bonaventure University	St. Bonaventure, New York	NY	Active	
**Pi Epsilon Kappa**	2021	Lees–McRae College	Banner Elk, North Carolina	NC	Active	
**Pi Epsilon Lambda**		Iowa State University	Ames, Iowa	IA	Active	
Pi Epsilon Mu					Inactive ?	
**Pi Epsilon Nu**		Delaware Valley University	Doylestown, Pennsylvania	PA	Active	
**Pi Epsilon Xi**		King University	Bristol, Tennessee	TN	Active	
**Pi Epsilon Omicron**		Winston-Salem State University	Winston-Salem, North Carolina	NC	Active	
**Pi Epsilon Pi**		Loras College	Dubuque, Iowa	IA	Active	
**Pi Epsilon Rho**		Saint Joseph's College of Maine	Standish, Maine	ME	Active	
**Pi Epsilon Sigma**		University of Massachusetts Dartmouth	Dartmouth, Massachusetts	MA	Active	
**Pi Epsilon Tau**		Alice Lloyd College	Pippa Passes, Kentucky	KY	Active	
**Pi Epsilon Upsilon**		North Greenville University	Tigerville, South Carolina	SC	Active	
**Pi Epsilon Phi**		University of Idaho	Moscow, Idaho	ID	Active	
**Pi Epsilon Chi**		Franciscan University of Steubenville	Steubenville, Ohio	OH	Active	
**Pi Epsilon Psi**		Jessup University	Rocklin, California	CA	Active	
**Pi Epsilon Omega**		Bridgewater State University	Bridgewater, Massachusetts	MA	Active	
**Pi Zeta Alpha**		Purdue University Fort Wayne	Fort Wayne, Indiana	IN	Active	
**Pi Zeta Beta**		Illinois College	Jacksonville, Illinois	IL	Active	
**Pi Zeta Gamma**		Penn State Beaver	Center Township, Pennsylvania	PA	Active	
**Pi Zeta Gamma**		Penn State New Kensington	Kensington, Pennsylvania	PA	Active	
**Pi Zeta Gamma**		Penn State Shenango	Sharon, Pennsylvania	PA	Active	
**Pi Zeta Delta**		Lubbock Christian University	Lubbock, Texas	TX	Active	
**Pi Zeta Epsilon**	2023	Baker College, Royal Oak Campus	Royal Oak, Michigan	MI	Active	
**Pi Zeta Zeta**		Meredith College	Raleigh, North Carolina	NC	Active	
**Pi Zeta Eta**		Mount Marty University	Yankton, South Dakota	SD	Active	
**Pi Zeta Theta**		Texas A&M University–Corpus Christi	Corpus Christi, Texas	TX	Active	
**Pi Zeta Iota**		State University of New York at Delhi	Delhi, New York	NY	Active	
**Pi Zeta Kappa**		Shepherd University	Shepherdstown, West Virginia	WV	Active	
Pi Zeta Lambda					Inactive ?	
**Pi Zeta Mu**		South Florida State College	Avon Park, Florida	FL	Active	
**Pi Zeta Nu**		Lewis–Clark State College	Lewiston, Idaho	ID	Active	
**Pi Zeta Xi**		Talladega College	Talladega, Alabama	AL	Active	
Pi Zeta Omicron					Inactive ?	
Pi Zeta Pi					Inactive ?	
**Pi Zeta Rho**		Temple University	Philadelphia, Pennsylvania	PA	Active	
**Pi Zeta Sigma**		Eastern Connecticut State University	Willimantic, Connecticut	CT	Active	
**Pi Zeta Tau**		Russell Sage College	Troy, New York	NY	Active	
**Pi Zeta Upsilon**		Wayland Baptist University	Plainview, Texas	TX	Active	
**Pi Zeta Phi**		Fort Valley State University	Fort Valley, Georgia	GA	Active	
**Pi Zeta Chi**		Shenandoah University	Winchester, Virginia	VA	Active	
**Pi Zeta Psi**		Elizabethtown College	Elizabethtown, Pennsylvania	PA	Active	
**Pi Zeta Omega**		Manhattan University	Bronx, New York City, New York	NY	Active	
**Pi Eta Alpha**		University of Kansas	Lawrence, Kansas	KS	Active	
**Phi Theta Omega**		University of Central Florida	Orlando, Florida	FL	Active	
Pi Sigma Upsilon		Portland State University	Portland, Oregon	OR	Inactive	
**Pi Upsilon Mu**		Coker University	Hartsville, South Carolina	SC	Active	
