= Zachary Lansdowne =

US Navy officer (1888–1925)

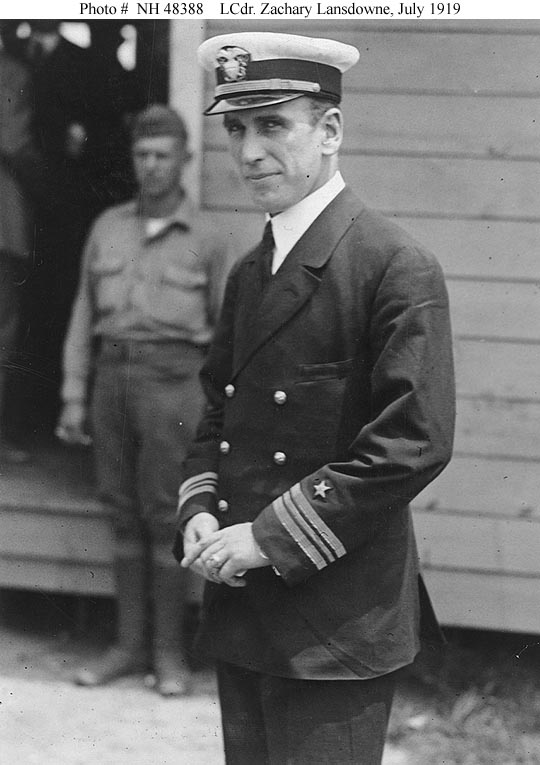
Lieutenant Commander Zachary Lansdowne, USN

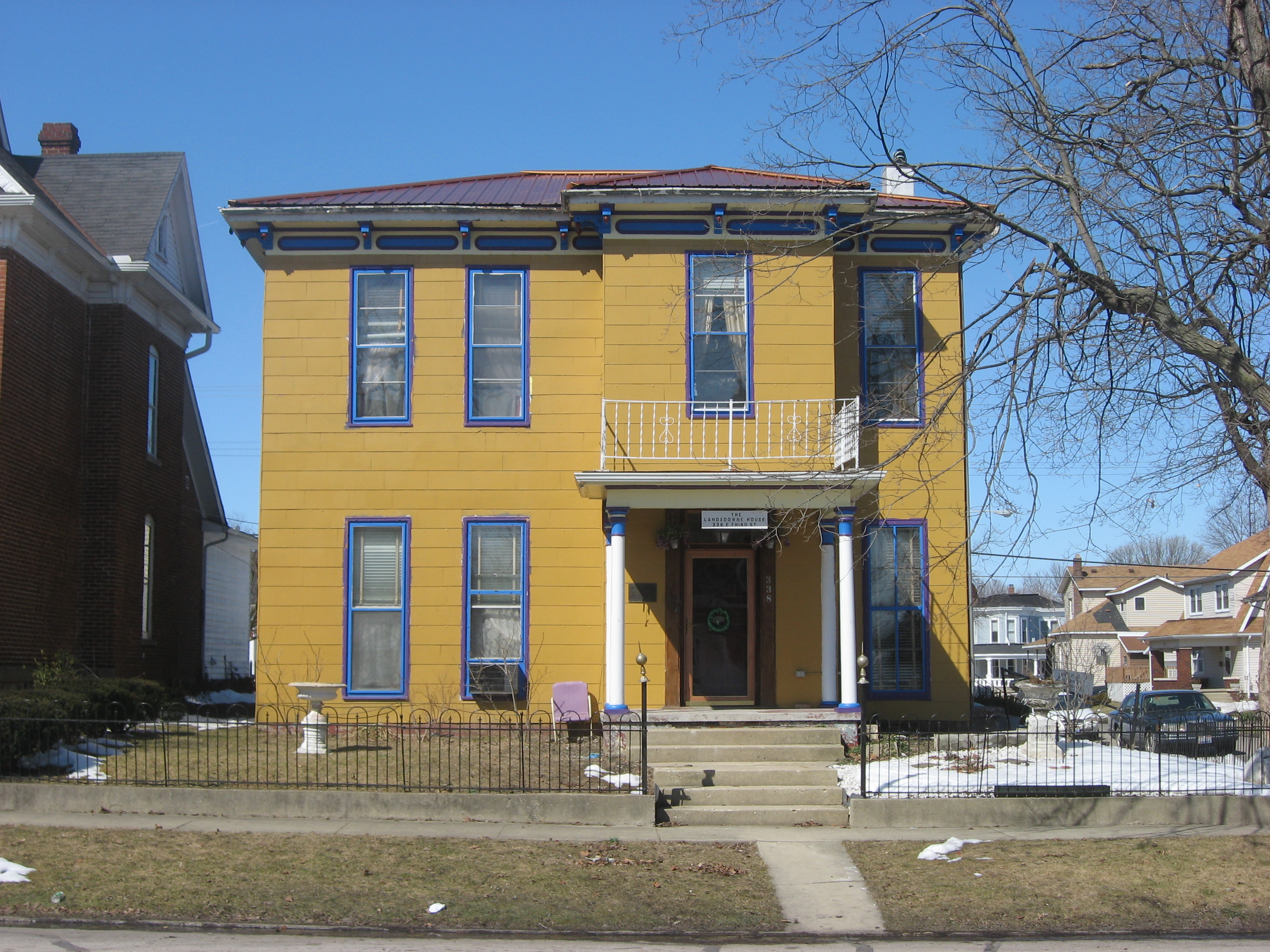
Lansdowne's house in Greenville

Lieutenant Commander Zachary Lansdowne, USN (December 1, 1888 – September 3, 1925) was a United States Navy officer and early naval aviator who contributed to the development of the Navy's first lighter-than-air craft. He earned the Navy Cross for his participation in the first transoceanic airship flight while assigned to the British R34 in 1919. He later commanded the USS Shenandoah (ZR-1), which was the first rigid airship to complete a flight across North America. He was killed in the crash of the Shenandoah.

== Biography ==
Born in Greenville, Ohio, Lansdowne was appointed to the United States Naval Academy September 2, 1905, and commissioned Ensign June 5, 1911. He subsequently served on the destroyer USS McCall (DD-28), and in the Ohio Naval Militia. After completing his aviation training, he became Naval Aviator 105.

Lansdowne was assigned to duty with the Royal Naval Air Service during and after World War I, to study dirigibles. He was awarded the Navy Cross "for distinguished service...as one of the crew of the British airship R-34, which in July 1919, made the first successful nonstop passage from England to the United States."

Lansdowne married Margaret "Betsy" Kennedy Ross (September 30, 1902 – June 9, 1982) on December 7, 1921, in Washington D.C. They had two children. She later remarried after Lansdowne's death.

On February 11, 1924, Lansdowne took command of the rigid airship, USS Shenandoah (ZR-1), and was killed when she crashed near Ava, Ohio on September 3, 1925. Lansdowne was buried later that month in section four at Arlington National Cemetery.

The crash of the Shenandoah was the trigger for United States Army Colonel Billy Mitchell to heavily criticize both Army and Navy leadership, leading directly to his court-martial for insubordination and the end of his military career.

Lansdowne was portrayed by Jack Lord in the film The Court-Martial of Billy Mitchell (1955).

Lansdowne's home in Greenville still stands; it is listed on the National Register of Historic Places.

== Namesake ==
The USS Lansdowne (DD-486), a Gleaves-class destroyer, and Lansdowne Airport in Youngstown, Ohio were named in Lansdowne's honor. A street in Carle Place, New York was also named in his honor.

== See also ==
- List of people on the cover of Time Magazine: 1920s
