= 24 Hour Alert =

1955 film

- Title frame
- Directed by: Robert M. Leeds
- Screenplay by: Beirne Lay Jr. Richard L. Breen
- Produced by: Cedric Francis
- Starring: Jack Webb
- Narrated by: Jack Webb; Paul Frees; Owen Crompton
- Cinematography: Edward Colman
- Edited by: Leo H. Shreve (as Leo Shreve); Rex Steele
- Music by: William Lava
- Production companies: United States Air Force (in association with); Mark VII Ltd. (co-production); Walt Disney Productions (co-production)
- Distributed by: Warner Bros.
- Release date: December 22, 1955
- Running time: 31 minutes
- Country: United States
- Language: English

24 Hour Alert is a 31-minute 1955 American docu-drama, made by Warner Bros. The film describes how, in 1955, the United States Air Force is ready for enemy attack during the Cold War. 24 Hour Alert was directed by Robert M. Leeds from a screenplay by Beirne Lay Jr. and Richard L. Breen. With the rising number of complaints about noise from military aircraft in the 1950s, the film was intended to acquaint viewers and residents in the United States as to the importance of air defense.

== Plot ==
When filmmaker and old friend Jack Webb visits Col. Jim Breech (Art Balinger), a U.S. Air Force base commander to gather information on Air Force "lingo", he finds there is something going on at the temporary base. Col. Breech has received civilian complaints about noise from Mayor Hogan (Walter Sande), the mayor of the nearby town, which he treats seriously.

After the mayor attempts to have the base relocated, on their flight returning from Washington, D.C., the mayor and town council encounter heavy fog that could be deadly. An interceptor from the base is able to help coax them to a safe landing speaking. The mayor is now convinced that the air force is important and along with the base commander. he sets about educating the town leaders and residents about the importance of the work of the USAF.

A series of promotional events including tours of the base and an air show serve to bring residents out to the base. Ultimately, the town learns to accept the presence of the air force base as a necessary part of the defense of the United States.

== Cast ==
- Jack Webb as himself
- Art Balinger as Col. Jim Breech (credited as Art Ballinger)
- Walter Sande as Mayor Hogan
- Ralph Moody as City Councilman Boggs
- James Hayes
- Mel Pogue

(Note: A screen title indicates, "Starring officers and men of the United States Air Force." It is followed by a dedication, "Our thanks to the officers and men of the United States Air Force whose story this is ... and to Jack Webb.")

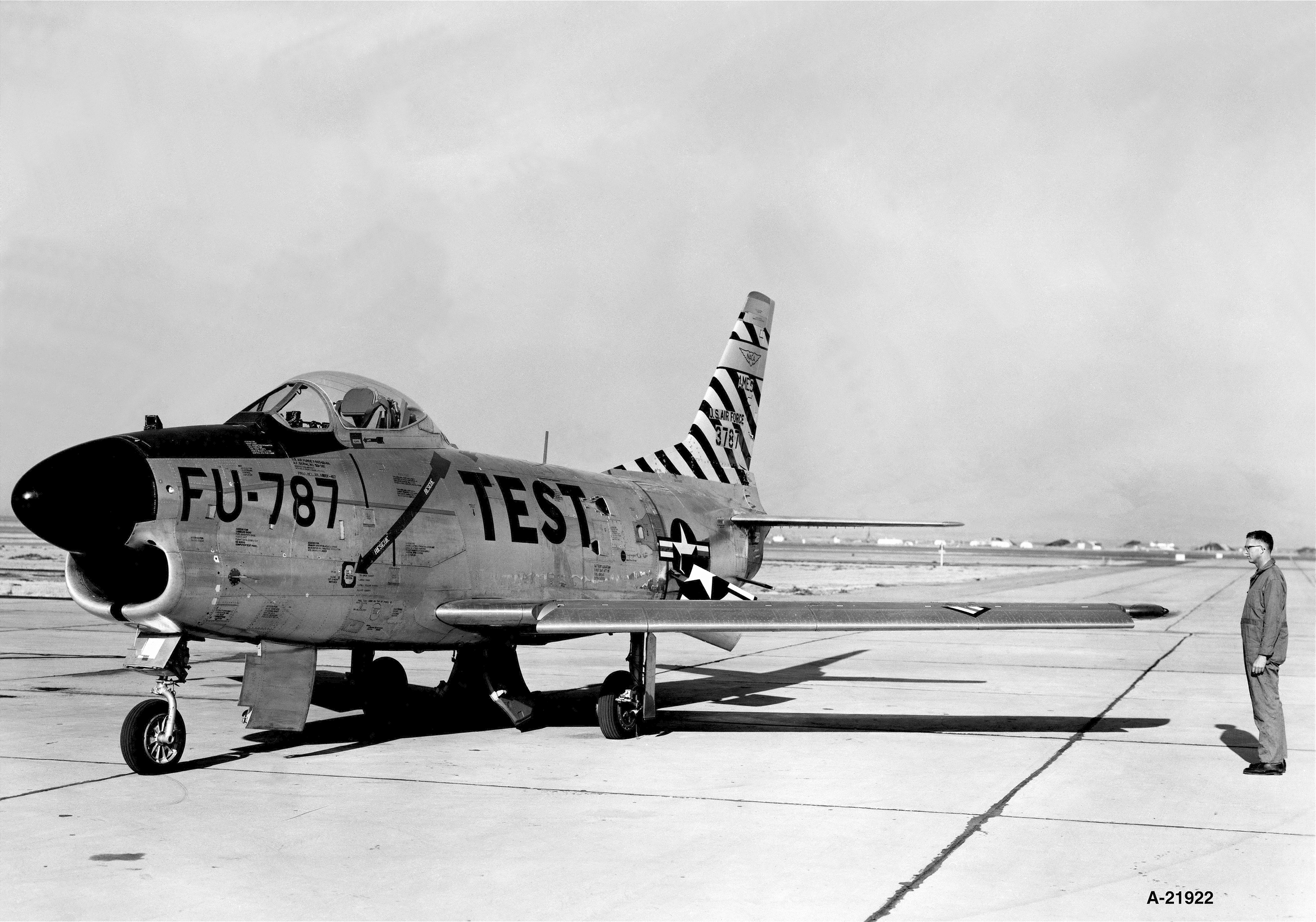
North American F-86D Sabre code-marked "FU-787" and "FU-775" were featured in 24 Hour Alert. The "Sabre Knights" aerobatic team was seen at the base air show.

== Production ==
24 Hour Alert was heavily supported by the United States Air Force as well as Mark VII Ltd., Walt Disney Productions in co-production roles. Major Lester Arasmith served as a technical advisor. A large number of current operational types were seen in the film, including the Boeing C-97 Stratofreighter, Boeing B-47 Stratojet, Boeing B-52 Stratofortress, Douglas A-4 Skyhawk, Fairchild C-123 Provider, Grumman F-11 Tiger, Lockheed C-130 Hercules, Martin B-57 Canberra, McDonnell F-101 Voodoo, North American Fury, North American B-25 Mitchell, North American F-86 Sabre, North American F-100 Super Sabre and Republic F-84 Thunderjet, Two experimental aircraft were also on display: Douglas D-558-2 Skyrocket and Douglas X-3 Stiletto.

The primary filming location was fictional Millville United States Air Force Base, possibly standing in for Southern California's March Air Force Base in the Sierra Nevada Mountain area.

== Reception ==
24 Hour Alert had its premiere in New York City on December 22, 1955, as the second feature along with The Court-Martial of Billy Mitchell. The film, subsequently, was paired with the longer feature in major cities. 24 Hour Alert was nominated along with producer Cedric Francis for an Academy Award as Best Short Subject, Two-reel.
