= Henry T. Thurber =

Henry Thomas Thurber (April 28, 1854 – March 17, 1904) was an American attorney.

Thurber was born in Monroe, Michigan, on April 28, 1854, the son of Jefferson Gage Thurber and Mary Bartlett Gerrish Thurber. He graduated from the University of Michigan in 1874. He married Elizabeth Brady Croul on October 20, 1880; they had five children, one of whom was Marion Bartlett Thurber. He was a prominent lawyer and held the office of Private Secretary to the White House during Grover Cleveland's term as President of the United States from 1893 to 1897. Thurber and his family resided in Detroit, Michigan, where he died on March 17, 1904, two weeks after an operation for appendicitis.
