= Noble Township, Noble County, Ohio =

Township in Ohio, US

- Township
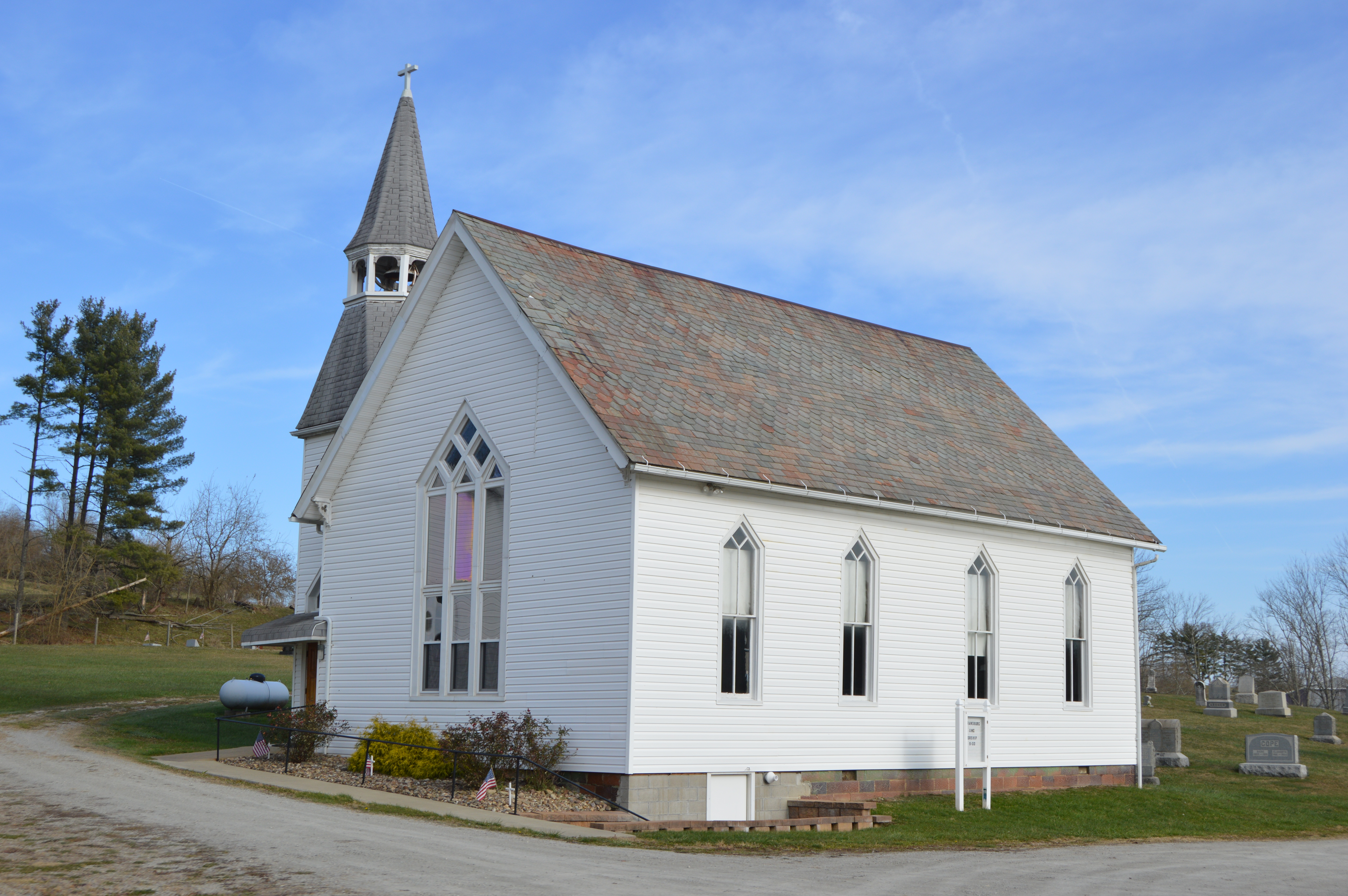
- Methodist church at Hiramsburg

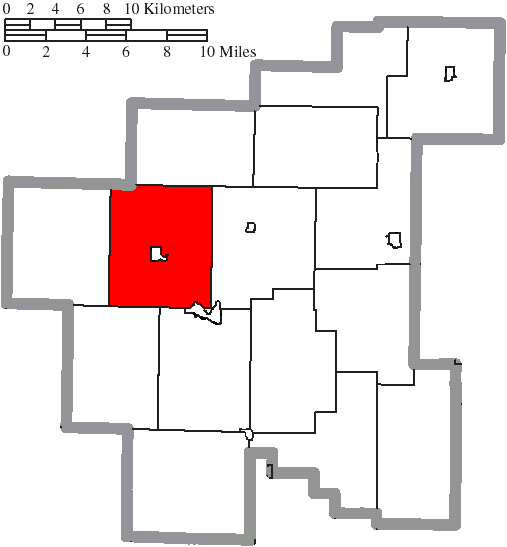
- Location of Noble Township in Noble County
- Coordinates: 39°47′27″N 81°33′16″W
- Country: United States
- State: Ohio
- County: Noble

Area
  - Total: 30.4 sq mi (78.7 km^{2})
  - Land: 29.9 sq mi (77.5 km^{2})
  - Water: 0.46 sq mi (1.2 km^{2})
- Elevation: 774 ft (236 m)

Population (2020)
  - Total: 1,986
  - Density: 66.4/sq mi (25.6/km^{2})
- Time zone: UTC-5 (Eastern (EST))
  - Summer (DST): UTC-4 (EDT)
- FIPS code: 39-56028
- GNIS feature ID: 1086748

Noble Township is one of the fifteen townships of Noble County, Ohio, United States. The 2020 census found 1,986 people in the township.

== Geography ==
Located in the part of the county, it borders the following townships:

- Buffalo Township - north
- Center Township - east
- Olive Township - southeast
- Sharon Township - southwest
- Brookfield Township - west
- Spencer Township, Guernsey County - northwest

Two populated places are located in Noble Township: the village of Belle Valley, the third largest village in Noble County, in the center, and the unincorporated community of Ava, in the far northwest, near the Guernsey County border.

== Name and history ==
Statewide, other Noble Townships are located in Auglaize and Defiance counties.

Along State Route 821 in the southern part of the township is located a memorial to John Gray, perhaps the last living veteran of the American Revolutionary War.

== Government ==
The township is governed by a three-member board of trustees, who are elected in November of odd-numbered years to a four-year term beginning on the following January 1. Two are elected in the year after the presidential election and one is elected in the year before it. There is also an elected township fiscal officer, who serves a four-year term beginning on April 1 of the year after the election, which is held in November of the year before the presidential election. Vacancies in the fiscal officership or on the board of trustees are filled by the remaining trustees.

== Transportation ==
Interstate 77 passes through Noble Township from north to south. Otherwise, the most important highways in the township are State Route 821, which runs north–south and connects Ava and Belle Valley, State Route 215, which runs east–west, and State Route 340, which begins in Belle Valley and travels northwest.
