= USS Shenandoah (ZR-1) =

United States Navy rigid airship destroyed in 1925

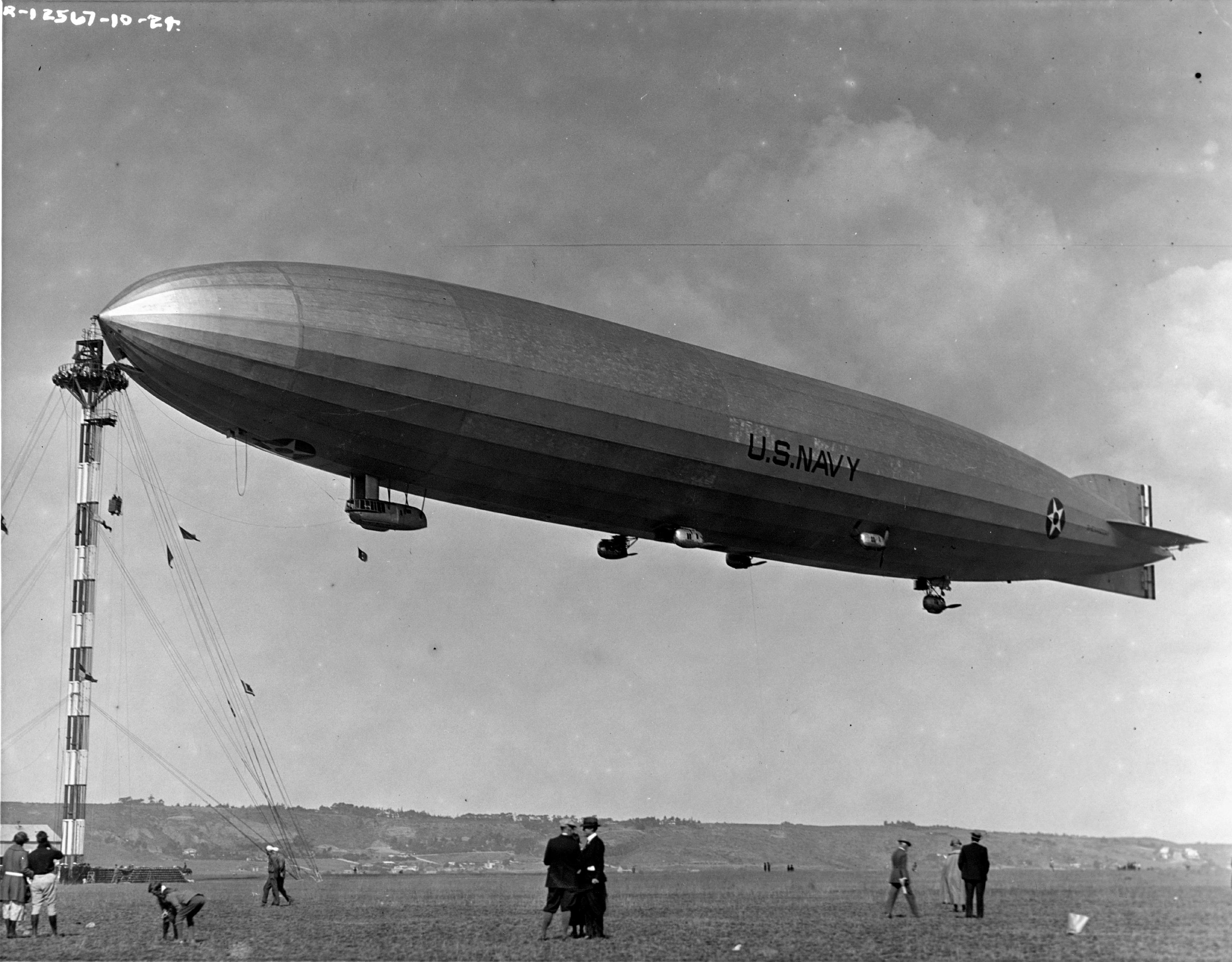
- USS Shenandoah moored at NAS San Diego in October 1924

History

United States
- Name: USS Shenandoah
- Namesake: Shenandoah Valley
- Ordered: 11 July 1919
- Builder: Naval Aircraft Factory, Philadelphia; Hangar No. 1, NAS Lakehurst
- Laid down: 24 June 1922
- Launched: 20 August 1923
- Christened: 10 October 1923
- Commissioned: 10 October 1923
- Maiden voyage: 4 September 1923
- Stricken: 5 September 1925
- Fate: Crashed during a thunderstorm near Caldwell, Ohio, 3 September 1925

General characteristics
- Class & type: Shenandoah-class rigid airship
- Tonnage: 77,500 lb (35,200 kg)
- Length: 680 ft (207.26 m)
- Beam: 78 ft 9 in (24.00 m) (maximum diameter)
- Height: 93 ft 2 in (28.4 m)
- Propulsion: Six (later five) 300 hp (220 kW) eight-cylinder Packard gasoline engines
- Speed: 60 kn (69 mph; 110 km/h)
- Range: 5,000 mi (4,300 nmi; 8,000 km)
- Capacity: Useful lift 53,600 lb (24,300 kg); Nominal gas volume: 2,100,000 ft³ (59,465 m³) (at 95% inflation)
- Complement: 25
- Armament: 6× 0.30 in (7.62 mm) Lewis machine guns; 8× 500 lb (230 kg) bombs

U.S. Historic district
- Official name: Shenandoah Crash Sites
- Designated: 25 July 1989
- Reference no.: 89000942
- Coordinates: Site #1: 39°50′21″N 81°32′22″W; Site #2: 39°50′7″N 81°32′46″W; Site #3: 39°44′29″N 81°35′36″W

USS Shenandoah (hull number ZR-1) was the first of four United States Navy rigid airships. It was constructed during 1922–1923 at Lakehurst Naval Air Station, and first flew in September 1923. It developed the U.S. Navy's experience with rigid airships and made the first crossing of North America by airship. On the 57th flight, Shenandoah was destroyed in a squall line over Ohio in September 1925.

== Design and construction ==
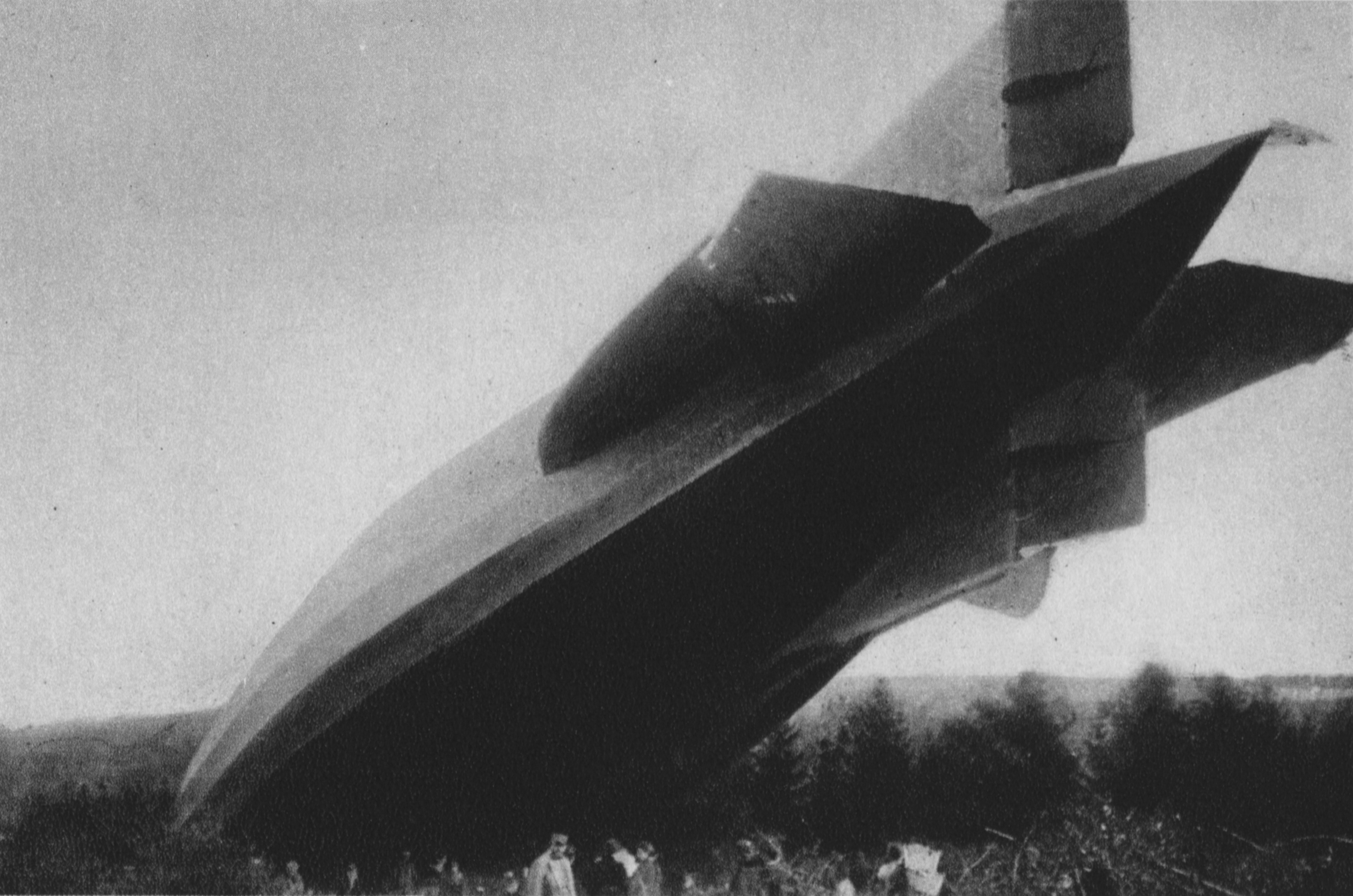
L-49/LZ-96, the airship that would serve as the basis for Shenandoah

Shenandoah was originally designated FA-1, for "Fleet Airship Number One" but this was changed to ZR-1. The airship was 680 ft (207.26 m) long and weighed 36 tons (32,658 kg). It had a range of 5,000 mi (4,300 nmi; 8,000 km), and could reach speeds of 70 mph (61 kn; 110 km/h). Shenandoah was assembled at Naval Air Station Lakehurst, New Jersey in 1922–1923, in Hangar No. 1, the only hangar large enough to accommodate the ship; its parts were fabricated at the Naval Aircraft Factory in Philadelphia. NAS Lakehurst had served as a base for Navy blimps for some time, but Shenandoah was the first rigid airship to join the fleet.

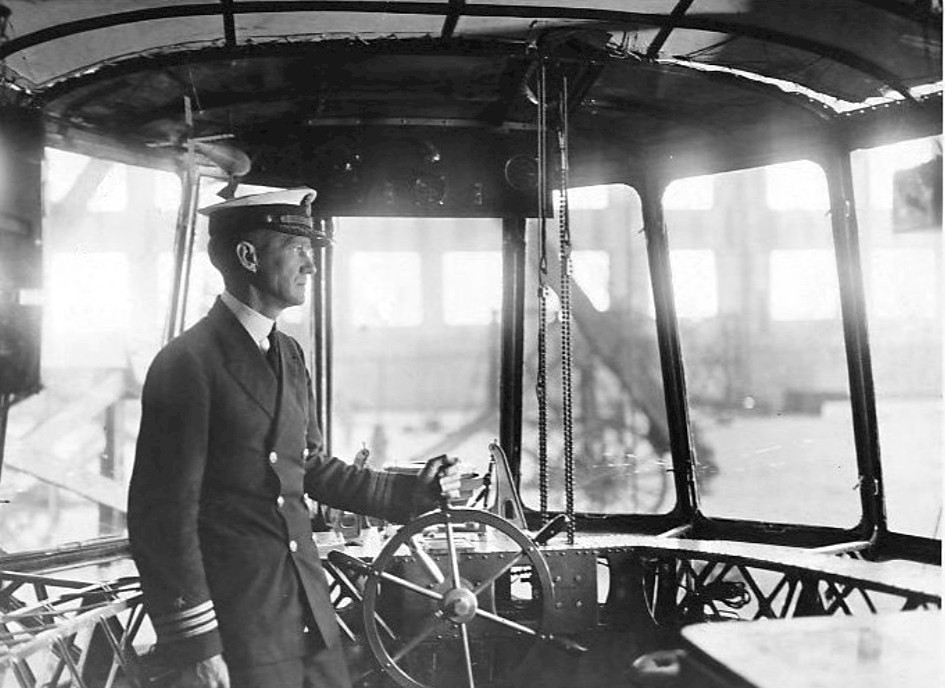
1923 photo of the airship control gondola of USS Shenandoah. Commander McCrary, the ship's commander, is shown at the wheel. Called "Empress of the Clouds"

The design was based on captured Zeppelin bomber L-49 (LZ-96), built in 1917. L-49 was a lightened Type U "height climber", designed for altitude at the expense of other qualities. The design was found insufficient and a number of the features of newer Zeppelins were used, as well as some structural improvements. The structure was built from a new alloy of aluminum and copper known as duralumin, supplied by Alcoa. Girders were fabricated at the Naval Aircraft Factory. Whether the changes introduced into the original design of L-49 played a part in Shenandoah's later breakup is a matter of debate. An outer cover of high-quality cotton cloth was sewn, laced or taped to the duralumin frame and painted with aluminum dope.

The gas cells were made of goldbeater's skins, one of the most gas-impervious materials known at the time. Named for their use in beating and separating gold leaf, goldbeater's skins were made from the outer membrane of the large intestines of cattle. The membranes were washed and scraped to remove fat and dirt, and then placed in a solution of water and glycerine in preparation for application to the rubberized cotton fabric providing the strength of the gas cells. The membranes were wrung out by hand to remove the water-glycerine storage solution and then rubber-cemented to the cotton fabric and finally given a light coat of varnish. The 20 gas cells within the airframe were filled to about 85% of capacity at normal barometric pressure. Each gas cell had a spring-loaded relief valve and manual valves operated from the control car.

=== Pioneer of helium-filled rigids ===
As the first rigid airship to use helium rather than hydrogen, Shenandoah had a significant edge in safety over previous airships. Helium was relatively scarce at the time, and Shenandoah used much of the world's reserves just to fill its 2,100,000 cubic feet (59,000 m^{3}) volume. Los Angeles—the next rigid airship to enter Navy service, originally built by Luftschiffbau Zeppelin in Germany as LZ 126—was at first filled with the helium from Shenandoah until more could be procured.

Shenandoah was powered by 300 hp (220 kW), eight-cylinder Packard gasoline engines. Six engines were originally installed, but in 1924 one engine (aft of the control car) was removed. The first frame of Shenandoah was erected by 24 June 1922; on 20 August 1923, the completed airship was floated free of the ground. Helium cost $55 (equivalent to $840 in 2019) per thousand cubic feet at the time, and was considered too expensive to simply vent to the atmosphere to compensate for the weight of fuel consumed by the gasoline engines. Neutral buoyancy was preserved by installing condensers to capture the water vapor in the engine exhaust.

== Service history ==
=== Early naval service ===
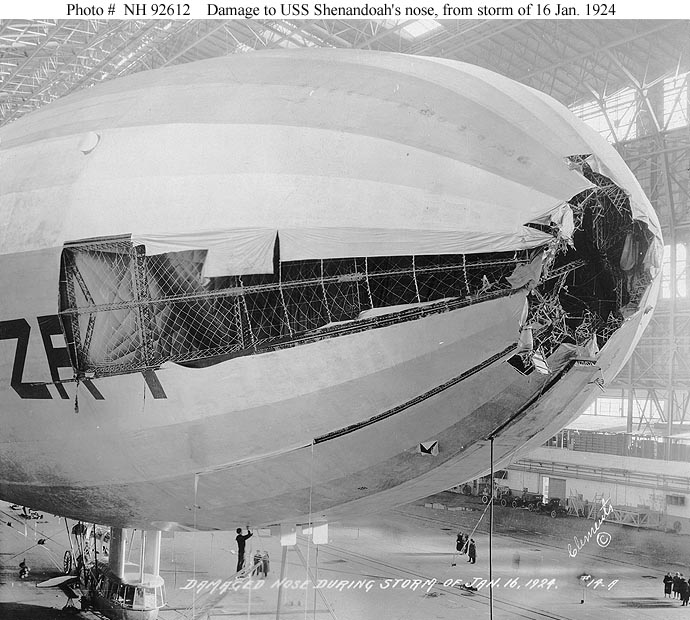
Shenandoah's damaged bow following the storm in January 1924

Shenandoah made her maiden flight on 4 September 1923. The airship was christened on 10 October 1923 by Marion Bartlett Thurber, wife of the Secretary of the Navy, and commissioned on the same day. She named the airship after her home in the Shenandoah Valley of Virginia, and the word "shenandoah" was said to be a Native American word meaning "daughter of stars".

Shenandoah was designed for fleet reconnaissance work of the type carried out by German naval airships in World War I. Her pre-commissioning trials included long-range flights during September and early October 1923, to test her airworthiness in rain, fog and poor visibility. On 27 October, Shenandoah celebrated Navy Day with a flight down the Shenandoah Valley and returned to Lakehurst that night by way of Washington and Baltimore, where crowds gathered to see the new airship in the beams of searchlights.

At this time, Rear Admiral William A. Moffett, Chief of the Bureau of Aeronautics and staunch advocate of the airship, was discussing the possibility of using Shenandoah to explore the Arctic. He felt such a program would produce valuable weather data as well as experience in cold-weather operations. With its endurance and ability to fly at low speeds, the airship was thought to be well-suited to such work and President Calvin Coolidge approved Moffett's proposal. On 16 January 1924, the upper tail fin of the Shenandoah was damaged during a high gale while moored to the mast at Lakehurst. The sudden rolling of the airship tore her away from the mast, ripping out her mooring winches, deflating the first helium cell and puncturing the second. The airship was blown across the field and disappeared into the darkness. Zeppelin test pilot and commander Anton Heinen, who was aboard when the incident occurred, rode out the storm for several hours and landed the airship safely the next morning, while being blown backwards. Extensive repairs to the Shenandoah took nearly 4 months, and the Arctic expedition was scrapped.

Shenandoah's repairs were completed in May, and in mid-1924 was working up its engines and radio equipment to prepare for fleet duty. In August 1924, the airship joined the Scouting Fleet and took part in tactical exercises. Shenandoah succeeded in discovering the "enemy" force as planned but lost contact with it in foul weather. Technical difficulties and lack of support facilities in the fleet forced the ship to depart the operating area ahead of time to return to Lakehurst. Although this marred the exercises as far as airship reconnaissance went, it emphasized the need for advanced bases and maintenance ships if lighter-than-air craft were to take any part in operations of this kind.

=== Flight across North America ===
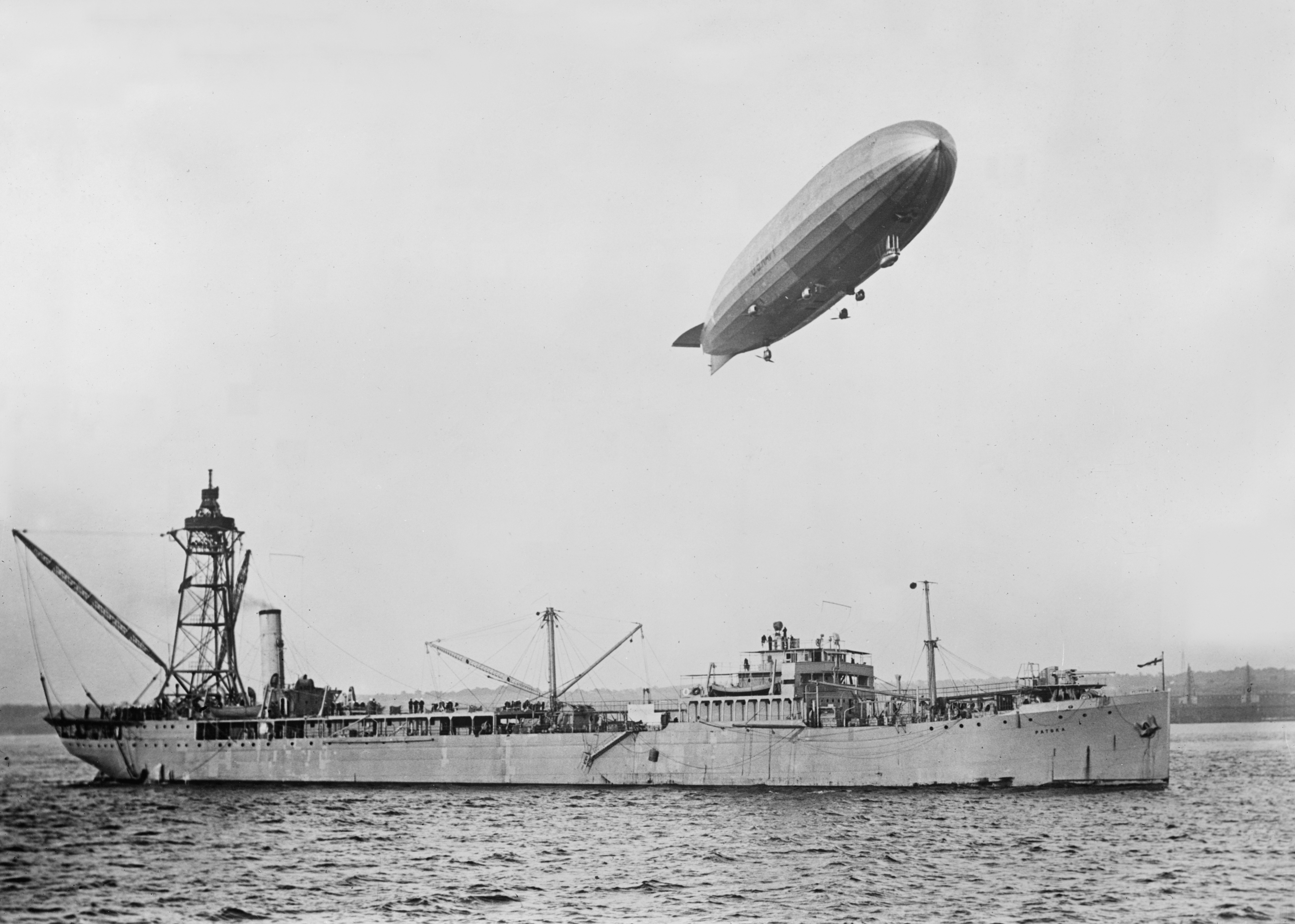
Shenandoah flies over the Patoka, the airship's supply tender

In July 1924, the oiler USS Patoka put in at Norfolk Naval Shipyard for extensive modifications to become the Navy's first airship tender. An experimental mooring mast 125 ft (38 m) above the water was constructed; additional accommodations both for the crew of Shenandoah and for the men who would handle and supply the airship were added; facilities for the helium, gasoline, and other supplies necessary for Shenandoah were built, as well as handling and stowage facilities for three seaplanes. Shenandoah engaged in a short series of mooring experiments with Patoka to determine the practicality of mobile fleet support of scouting airships. The first successful mooring was made on 8 August. During October 1924, Shenandoah flew from Lakehurst to California and on to Washington state to test newly erected mooring masts. This was the first flight of a rigid airship across North America.

=== Later naval career ===
1925 began with nearly six months of maintenance and ground test work. Shenandoah did not take to the air until 26 June, when it began preparations for summer operations with the fleet. In July and August, it again operated with the Scouting Fleet, successfully performing scouting tasks and being towed by Patoka while moored to that ship's mast.

== Crash of Shenandoah ==
On 2 September 1925, Shenandoah departed Lakehurst on a promotional flight to the Midwest that would include flyovers of 40 cities and visits to state fairs. Testing of a new mooring mast at Dearborn, Michigan, was included in the schedule. While passing through an area of thunderstorms and turbulence over Ohio early in the morning of 3 September, during its 57th flight, the Shenandoah was caught in a violent updraft that carried the ship beyond the pressure limits of its gas bags. The turbulence tore the airship apart, and it crashed in three main pieces near Caldwell, Ohio. Fourteen crew members, including Commander Zachary Lansdowne, were killed. Lansdowne and eight crew members in the control car (except for Lieutenant Anderson, who escaped) died when the car detached and fell from the airship; two men died after falling through holes in the hull; and four mechanics who fell with the engines were killed. There were twenty-nine survivors, who succeeded in riding the three sections of the airship to earth. The largest group was eighteen men who made it out of the stern after it rolled into a valley. Four others survived a crash landing of the central section. The remaining seven were in the bow section, which Commander (later Vice Admiral) Charles E. Rosendahl managed to navigate as a free balloon. In this group was Anderson who—until he was roped in by the others—straddled the catwalk over a large hole.

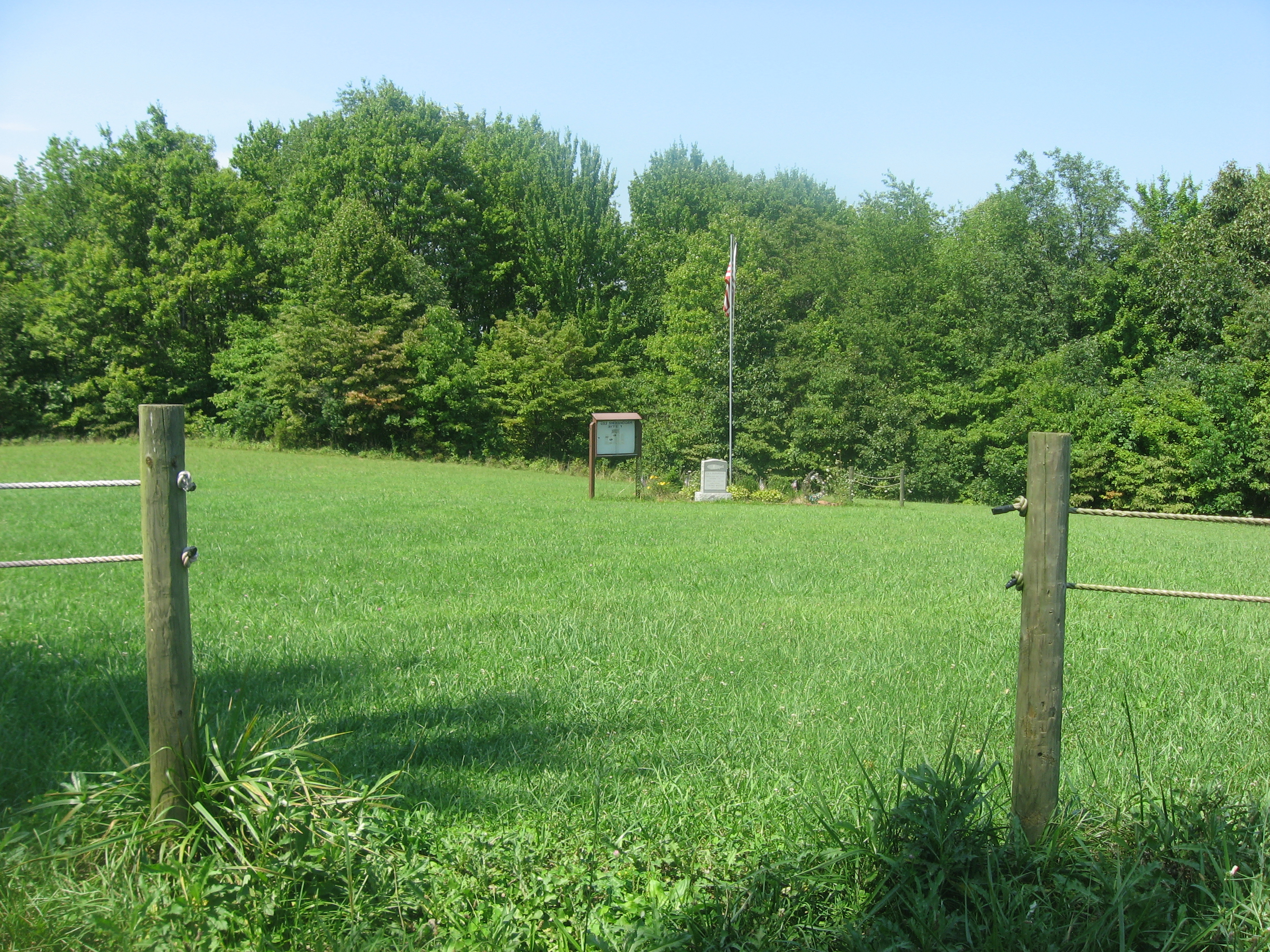
Memorial at Shenandoah Crash Site 1

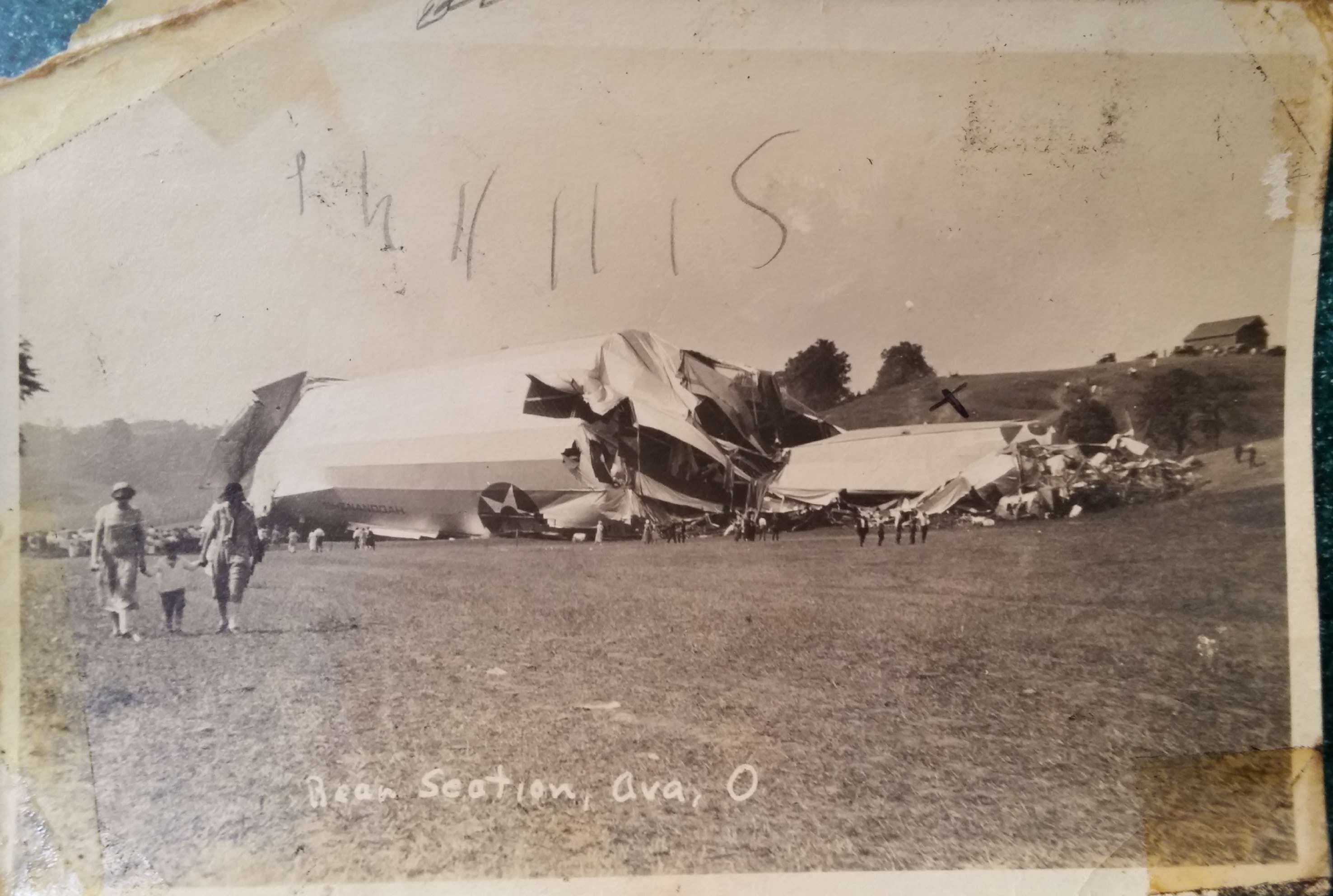
Aft section of Shenandoah at Crash site No 2

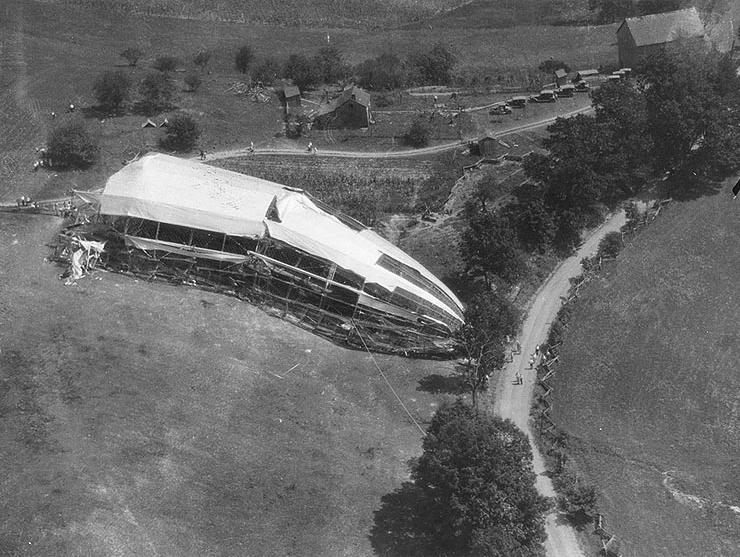
Front section of Shenandoah at Crash Site No 3

The Shenandoah Crash Sites are located in the hillsides of Noble County. Site No. 1, in Buffalo Township, surrounded the Gamary farmhouse, which lay beneath the initial break-up. An early fieldstone and a second, recent granite marker identifies where Commander Lansdowne's body was found. Site No. 2 (where the stern came to rest) is one-half mile (0.80 km) southwest of Site No. 1 across Interstate 77 in Noble Township. The rough outline of the stern is marked with a series of concrete blocks, and a sign marking the site is visible from the freeway. Site No. 3 is approximately six miles (9.7 km) southwest in Sharon Township at the northern edge of State Route 78 on the part of the old Nichols farm where the nose of Shenandoah's bow was secured to trees. Although the trees have been cut down, a semi-circular gravel drive surrounds their stumps and a small granite marker commemorates the crash. The Nichols house was later destroyed by fire.

Among the survivors was Frederick J. Tobin, who later commanded the Navy landing party for the arrival of the zeppelin Hindenburg on May 6, 1937, when the airship exploded into flames, and led rescue operations in response.

== Aftermath ==
=== Looting ===
The crash site attracted thousands of visitors in its first few days. Within five hours of the crash, more than a thousand people had arrived to strip the hulk of anything they could carry. On Saturday, 5 September 1925, the St. Petersburg Times of Florida reported the crash site had quickly been looted by locals, describing the frame as being "[laid] carrion to the whims of souvenir seekers". Among the items believed to have been taken were the vessel's logbook and its barograph, both of which were considered critical to understanding how the crash had happened. Also looted were many of the ship's 20 deflated silken gas cells, worth several thousand dollars each, most of them unbroken but ripped from the framework before the arrival of armed military personnel. Looting was so extensive it was initially believed that even the bodies of the dead had been stripped of their personal effects. That such looting was happening was denied by those publicly involved in the incident, however. Still, a local farmer on whose property part of the vessel's wreckage lay began charging the throngs of visitors $1 (equivalent to about $18 in 2025) for each automobile and 25¢ per pedestrian to enter the crash site, as well as 10¢ for a drink of water.

On 17 September the Milwaukee Sentinel reported that 20 Department of Justice operatives had been summoned to the site and that they, along with an unspecified number of federal and state prohibition agents, had visited private homes to collect four truck loads of wreckage along with personal grips of several crew members and a cap believed to have belonged to Commander Lansdowne. Lansdowne's Annapolis class ring had also been thought to have been taken from his hand by looters, but it was found by chance in June 1937 near crash site #1. No one was charged with any crime.

=== Inquiry ===
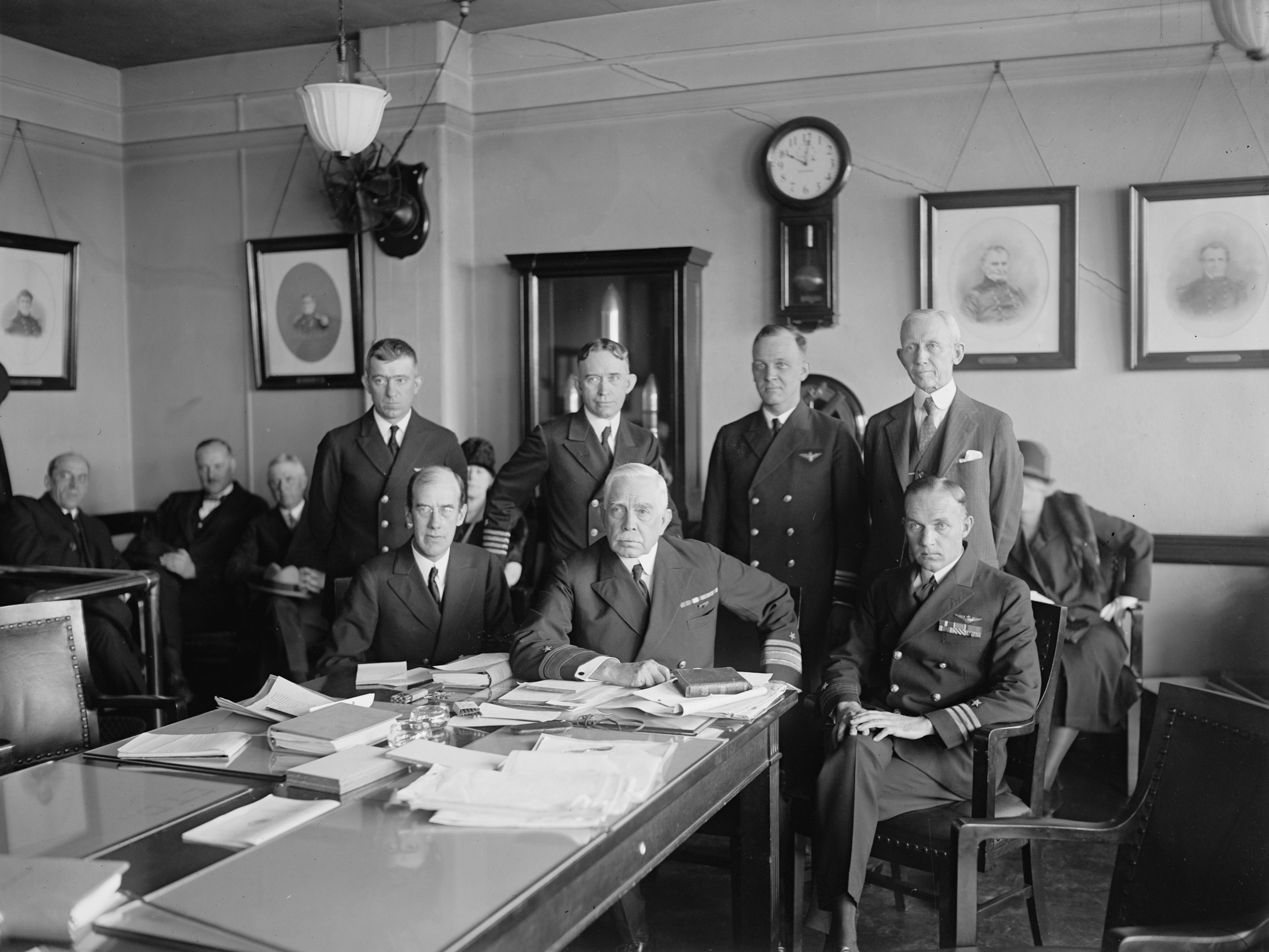
United States Navy board investigating the Shenandoah airship crash

The official inquiry brought to light the fact that the fatal flight had been made under protest by Commander Lansdowne (a native of Greenville, Ohio), who had warned the Navy Department of the violent weather conditions that were common to that area of Ohio in late summer. His pleas for a cancellation of the flight only caused a temporary postponement: his superiors were keen to publicize airship technology and justify the huge cost of the airship to the taxpayers. So, as Lansdowne's widow consistently maintained at the inquiry, publicity rather than prudence won the day. This event was the trigger for Army colonel Billy Mitchell to heavily criticize the leadership of both the Army and the Navy, leading directly to his court-martial for insubordination and the end of his military career. Heinen, according to the Daily Telegraph, placed the mechanical fault for the disaster on the removal of eight of the craft's 18 safety valves, saying that without them he would not have flown on her "for a million dollars". These valves had been removed in order to better preserve the vessel's helium, which at that time was considered a limited global resource of great rarity and strategic military importance; without these valves, the helium contained in the rising gas bags had expanded too quickly for the bags' valves' design capacity, causing the bags to tear apart the hull as they ruptured (the helium which had been contained in these bags became lost into the upper atmosphere).

After the disaster, airship hulls were strengthened, control cabins were built into the keels rather than suspended from cables, and engine power was increased. More attention was also paid to weather forecasting.

== Memorials ==
Several memorials remain near the crash site. There is another memorial at Moffett Field, California, a plaque at the Cathedral of the Air near Lakehurst Naval Air Station, and a small private museum in Ava, Ohio.

The Noble Local School District—which serves the area where Shenandoah crashed—has named its elementary, junior high, and high school after Shenandoah. Their sports teams are named "The Zeps," an abbreviation of "Zeppelin." A truck stop located about 15 mi (24 km) away in Old Washington, Ohio was named Shenandoah Plaza after the airship. The truck stop has since closed and has been torn down.

== In popular culture ==
The crash of the Shenandoah was popularized by the songs The Hand of Fate, written in 1925 by Eugene Spencer and Don Drew, and The Wreck of the Shenandoah which was written by Vernon Dalhart and Carson Robison. The latter song was also issued as a record with Vernon Dalhart performing it. Also, the Shenandoah disaster is referenced in a line of dialogue from the 1930 film Madam Satan, the plot of which also concerns a zeppelin crash.

== See also ==
- List of airships of the United States Navy
