= USS Lansdowne =

Gleaves-class destroyer

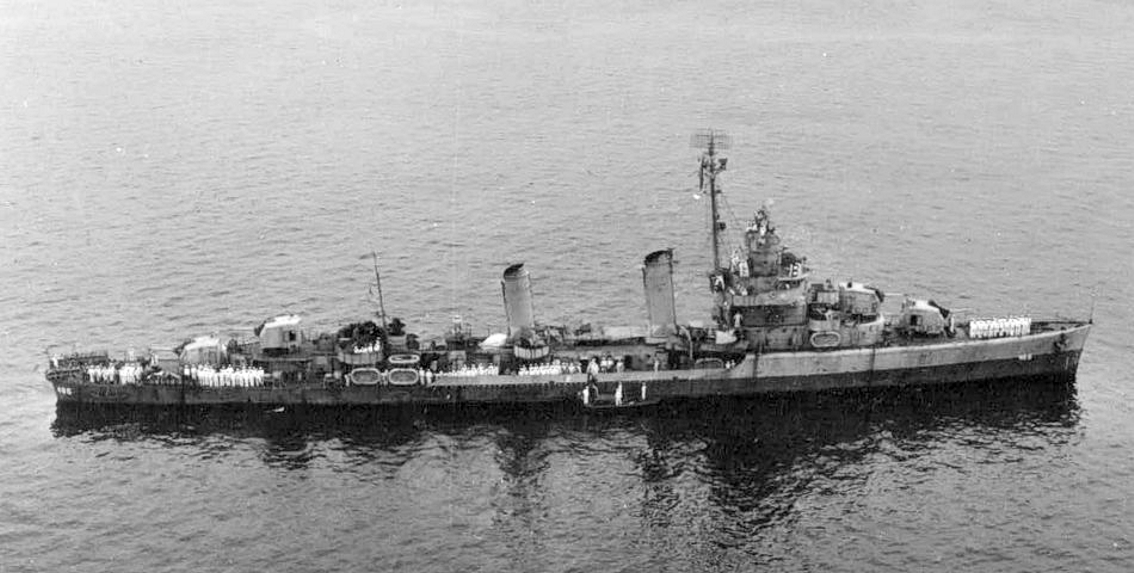
- USS Lansdowne disembarking the Japanese party into a boat from Iowa for transport to Missouri for the surrender ceremony, Tokyo Bay, 2 September 1945.

History

United States
- Name: Lansdowne
- Namesake: Zachary Lansdowne
- Builder: Federal Shipbuilding and Drydock Company
- Laid down: 31 July 1941
- Launched: 20 February 1942
- Commissioned: 29 April 1942
- Decommissioned: 2 May 1946
- Fate: Transferred to Turkey, 10 June 1949
- Stricken: 15 August 1949
- Motto: "We are going through together"
- Honours and awards: 12 Battle Stars

Turkey
- Name: Gaziantep
- Acquired: 10 June 1949
- Stricken: 1973
- Fate: Scrapped in 1973

General characteristics
- Class & type: Gleaves-class destroyer
- Displacement: 1,630 tons (2,200 tons loaded)
- Length: 348 ft 4 in (106.17 m)
- Beam: 36 ft (11 m)
- Draft: 17 ft 5 in (5.31 m)
- Propulsion: 57,000 shp (43,000 kW); 4 boilers; 2 propellers
- Speed: 37.4 knots (69 km/h)
- Range: 6,000 nmi (11,000 km; 6,900 mi) at 14 kn (26 km/h; 16 mph)
- Complement: 16 officers, 260 enlisted
- Armament: 4 × 5 in (127 mm) DP guns, 8 × 1.1 in (27.9 mm) guns (2×4), 4 × 40 mm AA guns.; 5 × 20 mm AA guns, 5 × 21 in (533 mm) torpedo tubes, 6 × depth charge projectors, 2 × depth charge tracks

USS Lansdowne (DD-486), a Gleaves-class destroyer, was the only ship of the United States Navy to be named for Lieutenant Commander Zachary Lansdowne.

Lansdowne was laid down on 31 July 1941 by Federal Shipbuilding & Dry Dock Company of Kearny, New Jersey and launched on 20 February 1942, sponsored by Miss Peggy Lansdowne, daughter of Lt.Cmdr. Lansdowne. The ship was commissioned on 29 April 1942, Lt. Cmdr. William R. Smedberg III in command.

== Service history ==
=== 1942 ===
Lansdowne first operated along the Atlantic seaboard on shakedown, antisubmarine, and escort duty, and attacked an enemy submarine off Cape Hatteras on 3 July. Following a severe depth charge attack, large quantities of oil bubbled to the surface and it was presumed the submarine had been sunk. Arriving at Cristobal, Panama Canal Zone, 13 July, the destroyer was sent to a position where PC-458 had located an enemy submarine. Upon arrival, Lansdowne launched a depth charge attack. Large quantities of oil rose to the surface, and the forward motion of the submarine ceased. Postwar records established that U-153 was sunk by these attacks.

On 21 August, Lansdowne transited the Panama Canal and headed for the South Pacific. En route to Tonga, she rescued the pilot and radioman of a splashed observation plane from the battleship South Dakota.

Arriving Nukuʻalofa Bay on 6 September, the destroyer joined Task Force 18 (TF 18), under Rear Admiral Leigh Noyes aboard the aircraft carrier Wasp. On 15 September 1942, Wasp was torpedoed and heavily damaged by gasoline fires. Lansdowne narrowly avoided one of the submarine Type 95 torpedoes that missed Wasp and later hit the battleship North Carolina. Lansdowne rescued 447 of Wasp's crew when the burning carrier was abandoned. As the remainder of (TF 18) moved on, Admiral Noyes ordered Lansdowne to sink Wasp and stand by the carrier until she was sunk. Lansdowne's Mark 15 torpedoes had the same unrecognized flaws reported for the Mark 14 torpedo. The first torpedo was fired at a range of 1,000 yards (910 m) and set to run 15 feet (4.6 m) under Wasp's keel for maximum damage with the magnetic influence exploder. When no result was observed from an apparently perfect wake, a second torpedo was fired at keel depth from a range of 800 yards (730 m). Once again, an apparently perfect shot produced no results; and Lansdowne had only three more torpedoes. Lansdowne's torpedomen disabled the magnetic influence exploders and set depth at 10 feet (3.0 m). All three torpedoes detonated, but Wasp remained afloat in the orange flames of a burning pool of gasoline and oil. Lansdowne nervously zig-zagged silhouetted in the fire's glow until Wasp sank by the bow at 2100.

Lansdowne, with Task Group 64.1 (TG 64.1), took part in the occupation of Funafuti, Ellice Islands, 2 October, then escorted aircraft ferry Hammondsport to Espiritu Santo. From 13 October, the ship screened various task forces, groups, and units in the British Solomons, escorted damaged ships to safety, and on 30 November sighted and bombarded a large group of Japanese landing barges, sinking several and scoring direct hits on a beached enemy ship east of Cape Esperance. She also shelled shore installations from Buala to Visale.

On 30 November, Lansdowne made three attacks against a submerged target west of Koli Point, bringing diesel oil, slabs of cork, and air bubbling to the surface. In December, she made an escort run from Tulagi to Sydney and Auckland, returning to Nouméa.

=== 1943 ===
Continuing to serve in the Solomons, Lansdowne grounded in the Russells on 26 February, and sailed on 11 March for repairs at San Francisco.

From May to July, the ship operated in the Aleutians, bombarding Kiska on 6 July. She headed back to Espiritu Santo from Pearl Harbor 30 July, and joined an antishipping force off Vella Lavella on 2 September. Escort duty in the Solomons and to Fiji continued until 29 October.

Lansdowne then screened fast carriers as they attacked Buka-Bonis (1 to 2 November) and Rabaul (5 and 11 November). While covering landing operations at Empress Augusta Bay 28 November, the ship repelled an enemy air attack and, two days later, bombarded Bougainville, which she hit again late in December.

=== 1944 ===
During January and February 1944, Lansdowne covered the landings at Torokina, Bougainville, and Green Island, and conducted antishipping sweeps between Buka and Rabaul. On 18 February the destroyer bombarded and torpedoed shipping at Koravia Bay in the first surface action against Rabaul. Numerous fires were started ashore and on the shipping. On the night of 24/25 February, Lansdowne sank a 6,800-ton Japanese cargo ship about 20 miles (35 km) north of New Hanover. Early the following morning, she opened fire on shore emplacements and shipping at Kavieng, silencing a large coastal gun and several other batteries and sinking one ship while setting fire to two others.

After operating northwest of the Admiralties, Lansdowne joined TFs 77 and 78 for the initial landings in the Aitape–Hollandia–Tanahmerah area of northern New Guinea and launched air attacks on Palau, Yap, Ulithi, and other enemy bases in the Central Pacific on 3 March through 1 April. The ship then returned to Pearl Harbor for refit, arriving 18 May.

Lansdowne arrived at Majuro on 5 June, and the next day, joined TF 58 for the Marianas operation through June and July, thus participating in the raids on Bonis on 15 and 16 June, the Battle of the Philippine Sea 19 and 20 June, and the assaults on Guam and Tinian. On 30 July the destroyer sailed for overhaul at Bremerton, Washington, returning to Ulithi on 29 October.

=== 1945 ===
On patrol and escort in the western Carolines until 5 May 1945, she then steamed to the Ryūkyūs for duty off Okinawa. She patrolled anti-submarine stations around the island complex, gave fire support, and screened aircraft carriers.

Lansdowne next operated with the 3rd Fleet off Japan screening logistics groups and fast carriers launching strikes against the enemy homeland. The ship was detached from the task force 20 to 23 August to transport the Atomic Bomb Investigation Group to Okinawa and then proceeded to Sagami Wan, arriving 27 August.

On 29 August, Lansdowne escorted battleship South Dakota, Admiral Chester Nimitz’ flagship, into Tokyo Bay, and then operated with units of the Allied Prisoner of War Rescue Group evacuating prisoners from camps in southern Honshū. The ship was detached on 2 September 1945 to transfer Japanese emissaries from Yokohama to the battleship Missouri in Tokyo Bay to sign the official Instrument of Surrender, returning the party to Yokohama the same day. She operated out of Yokohama until sailing on 15 October from Wakanoura for the United States via Singapore, Colombo, and Cape Town, arriving at the Brooklyn Navy Yard on 6 December 1945.

=== Post war ===
Lansdowne departed for Charleston, South Carolina, on 17 January 1946 and decommissioned to enter the Atlantic Reserve Fleet there 2 May 1946. On 10 June 1949 the ship was transferred to the Turkish Navy, which she served as TCG Gaziantep (D 344) until 1973.

== Awards ==
Lansdowne received 12 battle stars for World War II service.
