= Marion Bartlett Thurber =

American political spouse

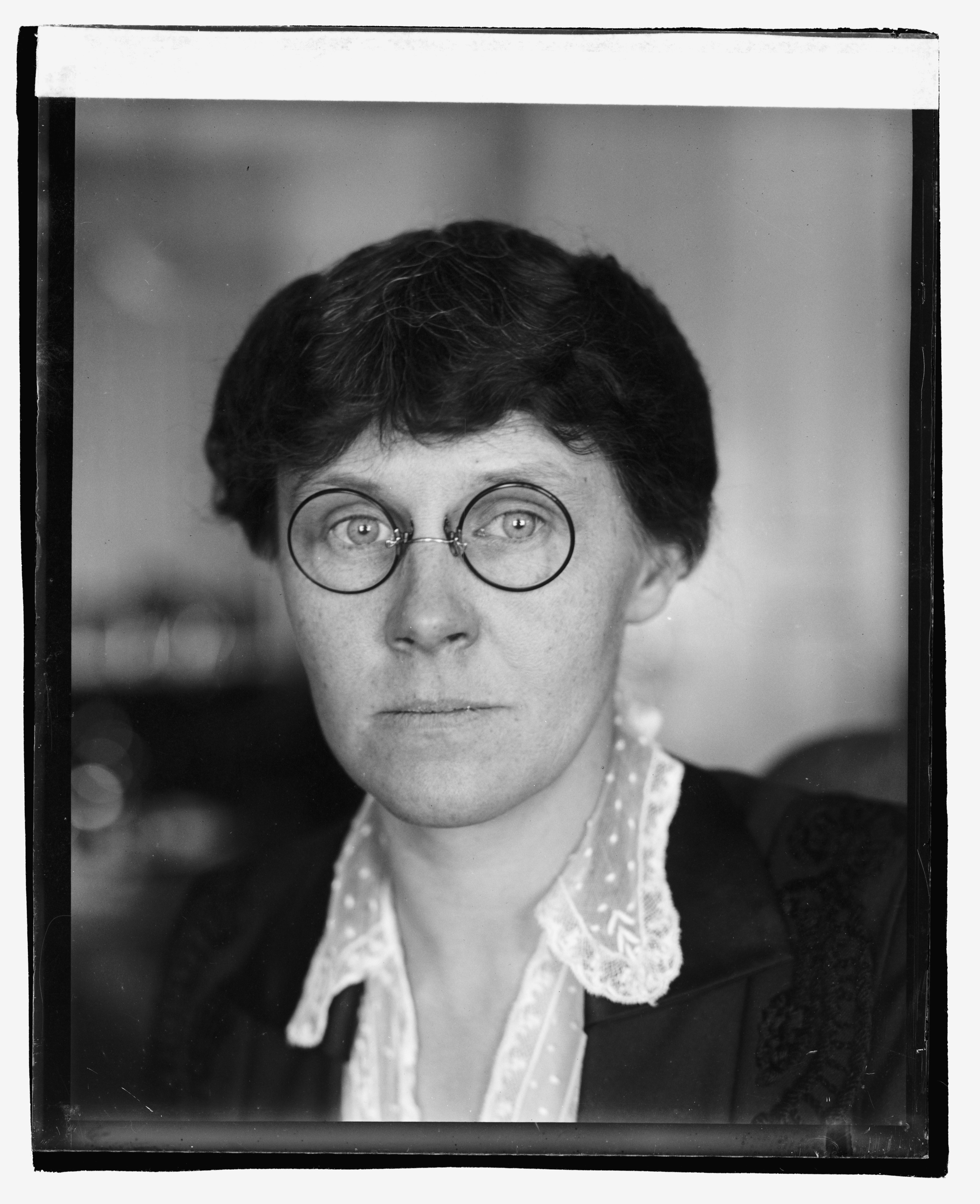
- Born: February 22, 1885; Detroit, Michigan
- Died: 2 November 1973 (aged 88); St. Clair Shores, Michigan
- Other names: Marion Thurber Denby, Mrs. Edwin Denby

Marion Bartlett Thurber (February 22, 1885 - November 2, 1973) was an American political spouse who managed her husband's legacy after his early death.

Thurber was born in 1885 to Henry Thomas Thurber and Elizabeth Brady Croul, the oldest of five children. She was named after Marion, Massachusetts, the same as Grover Cleveland's daughter. Her father was the personal secretary to Grover Cleveland beginning in 1893 and she spent some of her childhood in the Shenandoah Valley in Virginia. Newspapers said she "got her first schooling in the White House kindergarten."

She married Edwin Denby on March 18, 1911, after which they had a six-month honeymoon. They had two children, Edwin J. (1912) and Marion (1915). They had a solid partnership. Denby referred to her as his "good scout" and "spunky comrade." Thurber said of herself that she was "a contented happy wife...absolutely free for a desire for worldly success." Thurber was supportive of Denby when he enlisted in the Marines as a private in 1917. He was discharged in 1919 with the rank of major.

Thurber would often perform ceremonial functions of a political spouse including christening boats and airships when her husband was the United States Secretary of the Navy. This included the naming of the USS Shenandoah, the first rigid airship built by the Navy, which she named after the place she had grown up. She would also host local and visiting dignitaries such as Madame Curie who visited Washington D. C. in 1921 and President Harding in 1922. She was frequently in the society pages, such as when she was one of the main patronesses of the United Daughters of the Confederacy ball in Washington D. C. in 1921.

Denby died in 1929 and Thurber turned to civics and set to memorializing him. She became president of the Women's City Club of Detroit. She helped erect a "Denby Memorial" at Grand Circus Park in 1933 which memorialized when and where Denby had originally enlisted. She donated the bulk of his papers to the University of Michigan and made other bequests to local art museums in Michigan.

She died on November 2, 1973, and is buried in Elmwood Cemetery in Detroit, Michigan.
