= Hiramsburg, Ohio =

Unincorporated community in Ohio, U.S.

Coordinates: 39°48′30″N 81°35′44″W

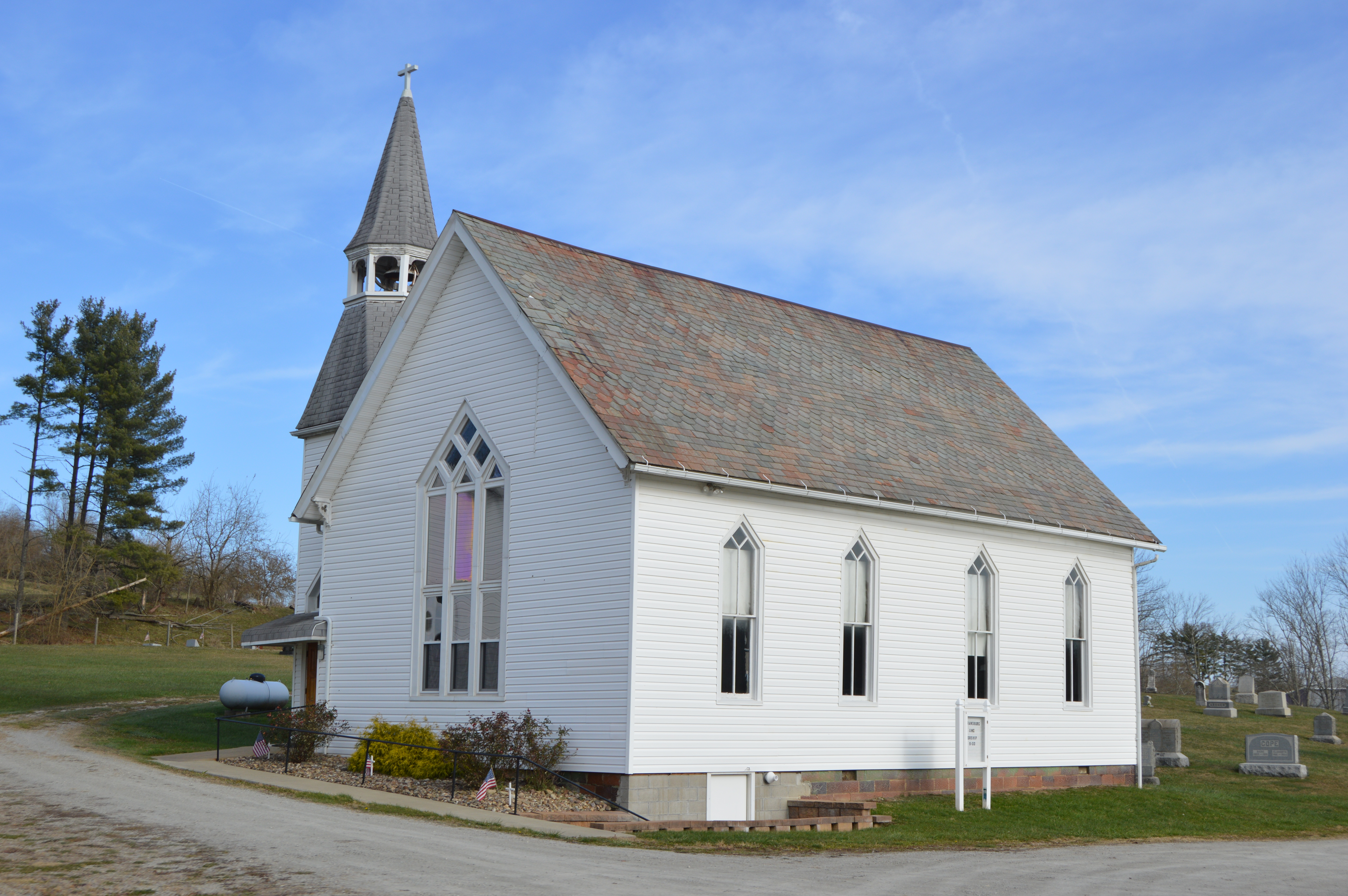
Methodist church on State Route 340

Hiramsburg is an unincorporated community in Noble County, in the U.S. state of Ohio.

== History ==
Hiramsburg was platted in 1836 by Hiram Calvert, and named for him. A post office was established at Hiramsburg in 1837, and remained in operation until 1920.
