= Ava, Ohio =

Unincorporated community in Ohio, U.S.

Coordinates: 39°49′54″N 81°34′29″W

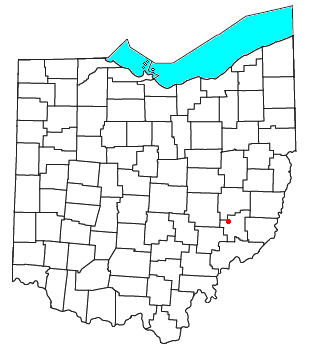
Location of Ava, Ohio

Ava is an unincorporated community in northwestern Noble Township, Noble County, Ohio, United States. It has a post office with the ZIP code 43711. Another location in Ava is a small museum dedicated to the nearby crash of the airship USS Shenandoah in 1925.

== History ==
Ava was laid out in 1873. The community was a station and shipping point on the Cleveland & Marietta Railroad.
