= My Lover's Prayer =

1997 song by Bee Gees

Song by Bee Gees

from the album Still Waters
- Written: 1995
- Released: 10 March 1997
- Recorded: 1996
- Length: 4:00
- Label: Polydor (UK); A&M (US)
- Songwriters: Barry Gibb, Robin Gibb, Maurice Gibb
- Producer: Russ Titelman

"My Lover's Prayer" is a song performed by the Bee Gees, written by Barry Gibb, Robin Gibb and Maurice Gibb, and was released in 1997 on the album Still Waters. The track was originally written and recorded in 1995, but it was only a demo.

In 2003, it was recorded by Alistair Griffin featuring Robin Gibb and was released as a double A-side.

== Personnel ==
- Barry Gibb - lead vocals
- Robin Gibb - lead vocals
- Maurice Gibb - backing vocals
- Robbie Kondor - keyboard, arranger
- Rob Mounsey - keyboard
- Marc Schulman - guitar
- Anthony Jackson - bass
- Russ Titelman - arranger
- Arif Mardin - strings arrangement
- Steve Eigner - sound engineer
- Mike Viola - sound engineer

== Alistair Griffin and Robin Gibb version ==
"My Lover's Prayer"

Single by Alistair Griffin featuring Robin Gibb

from the album Bring It On
- A-side: "Bring It On"; (double A-side)
- Released: 29 December 2003
- Recorded: November 2003, London, England
- Genre: Pop
- Length: 3:56
- Label: UMTV
- Songwriters: Barry Gibb, Robin Gibb, Maurice Gibb
- Producers: Deacon Smith, Ian Curnow

Robin Gibb singles chronology
| "Wait Forever" (2003) | "My Lover's Prayer" (2003) | "You and Me (Tonight)" (2004) |

Alistair Griffin singles chronology
| ""Bring It On" / My Lover's Prayer" (2003) | "You and Me (Tonight)" (2004) |

"My Lover's Prayer" was released as a single in 2003 by Alistair Griffin featuring Robin Gibb, as a double A-side with "Bring It On".

Robin Gibb had intended to re-release the song as a solo single in 2003 with backing vocals by Lance Bass and Wanya Morris, and a promo version of this had already been given radio play. However, the morning after the Fame Academy 2 final, Gibb contacted Griffin with a request to re-record a duet of the song, with the apparent intention of releasing it as a Christmas single. This version also used Gibb's original vocals with a new edit of the instrumental track. Three other performers from Fame Academy 2, Peter Brame, Carolynne Good and winner Alex Parks sang the backing vocals.

=== Personnel ===
- Robin Gibb - lead vocals
- Wanya Morris - backing vocals (first version)
- Lance Bass - backing vocals (first version)
- Alistair Griffin - lead vocals (second version)
- Peter Brame - backing vocals (second version)
- Carolynne Good - backing vocals (second version)
- Alex Parks - backing vocals (second version)
- Deconzo Smith - keyboards, guitar, bass, producer
- Olly Meacock - programming
- Dave Ford - sound engineer
- Ian Curnow - producer
