= Honesty (disambiguation) =

Honesty is the human quality of communicating and acting truthfully and with fairness.

Honesty or honest may also refer to:

== Plants ==
- Honesty, a common name for plants in the genus Lunaria
  - Lunaria annua, a garden plant

== Music ==
=== Albums ===
- Honest (Future album), 2014
- Honest (soundtrack), the soundtrack to the film by David A. Stewart
- Honest (Dave Stewart and the Spiritual Cowboys album), 1991
- Honesty (Rodney Atkins album), a 2003 album by Rodney Atkins
  - "Honesty (Write Me a List)", a single from Rodney Atkins' 2003 album
- Honesty (Curtis Mayfield album), 1983
- Honesty (Alex Parks album), a 2005 album by Alex Parks
- Honesty (Jaya album), 1999

=== Songs ===
- "Honesty" (Alex Parks song), 2006
- "Honesty" (Billy Joel song), 1979
- "Honesty" (Editors song), 2013
- "Honest" (The Chainsmokers song), 2017
- "Honest" (Future song), 2013
- "Honest" (Kodaline song), 2014
- "Honest" (Justin Bieber song), 2022
- "Honesty", a song by Sara Groves from the 2007 album Tell Me What You Know
- "Honesty", a song by Nelly Furtado from the 2024 album 7
- "Honest", a song by Baby Keem from the 2019 mixtape Die for My Bitch
- "Honest", a song by Band of Skulls from the 2009 album Baby Darling Doll Face Honey
- "Honest", a song by Bazzi from the 2018 album Cosmic
- "Honest", a song by Rachael Lampa from the album Rachael Lampa
- "Honest", a song by The Long Winters from the 2006 album Putting the Days to Bed
- "Honest", a song by Shawn Mendes from the 2016 album Illuminate
- "Honest", a song by Lisa Stansfield from the 1997 album Lisa Stansfield
- "Honest", a song by The Verve Pipe from the 1993 album Pop Smear
- "Honest", a song by Cotton Candy, a fictional K-pop group from the 2021 TV series Idol: The Coup

== Film and television ==
- Honest (TV series), a UK remake of the New Zealand TV series Outrageous Fortune
- Honesto, a 2013 Philippine television drama
- Honest (film), a 2000 film featuring members of All Saints

== Other uses ==
- Honesty, Ohio, a community in the United States
- Honesty, a publication of the late nineteenth century Melbourne Anarchist Club
- Honest, short name for The Honest Company
- Honesty, a racehorse that finished unplaced in the 1842 Grand National

== See also ==
- Honestly (disambiguation)
- Honestus (disambiguation)
