= Bring It On (Alistair Griffin song) =

2003 single by Alistair Griffin

Single by Alistair Griffin

from the album Bring It On
- Released: 29 December 2003
- Recorded: London, England
- Genre: Pop
- Length: 3.03
- Label: UMTV
- Songwriter: Alistair Griffin
- Producers: Ian Curnow; Deacon Smith

Alistair Griffin singles chronology
"Bring It On" / "My Lover's Prayer" (2003)	"You and Me (Tonight)" (2004)

"Bring It On" is the debut single from British singer/songwriter Alistair Griffin, and is also the title track and first release from his debut album, Bring It On. It was released in December 2003 as a double A-side with "My Lover's Prayer", a duet with Robin Gibb of the Bee Gees and reached number five on the UK Singles Chart.

== "Bring It On" ==
"Bring It On" had been written several years before when Griffin had been an unsigned artist working in Germany. It had already been showcased live on the BBC Fame Academy programme, prompting Richard Park to comment: "the acid test is always if a song gets into your brain, and I have to confess Alistair, that one has got into my brain."

Griffin had been signed to UMTV, a division of Universal, soon after the programme ended in October 2003 and the label announced shortly afterwards that "Bring It On" was to be his debut single, with a November release date.

== "My Lover's Prayer" ==
"My Lover's Prayer" (titled "A Lover's Prayer" on the cover of the limited-edition single) was originally recorded by the Bee Gees, and appeared on their 1997 album Still Waters. Robin Gibb had intended to re-release the song as a solo single in 2003 with backing vocals by Lance Bass and Wanya Morris, and a promo version of this had already been given radio play. However, the morning after the Fame Academy 2 final, Gibb contacted Griffin with a request to re-record a duet of the song, with the apparent intention of releasing it as a Christmas single. This version also used Robin's original vocals with a new remix of the instrumental track. Three other performers from Fame Academy 2, Peter Brame, Carolynne Good and winner Alex Parks sang the backing vocals.

== Release ==
Initially announced as two separate releases, the dates of both singles were unaccountably delayed until after Christmas 2003, when "Bring It On" was eventually released as a double A-side with "My Lover's Prayer" (the latter credited as Alistair Griffin feat. Robin Gibb) on 29 December, entering the UK Singles Chart at number five the following week.

Many fans were disappointed with the poor production quality and the generic 'pop' treatment of the recorded version of "Bring It On", preferring the live version previously seen on TV. Reviewers also criticised it as being too bland. The duet, which was separately produced, was generally well received, but was not popular with music critics.

== Radio promotion ==
Although given extensive live promotion, "Bring It On" was not playlisted on any of the national radio networks, fulfilling Richard Park's prediction that Griffin would not get radio play on any of his Emap stations. Following the controversy over Fame Academy, and in what appeared to be a general backlash against reality TV performers, "Bring It On" was not aired on any of the BBC's programmes other than the Sunday evening chart show after it had charted in the United Kingdom.

"My Lover's Prayer" was included on Radio 2's B playlist for a short time.

== Music video ==
The video for "Bring It On" was a tribute to the cult Channel 4 television programme Phoenix Nights, starring Peter Kay. Made by Flynn Productions, directed by Craig Pickles and produced by Charlotte Woodhead, it was set in a stereotypical Northern England working men's club, the singer was first shown alone on stage, playing to a deserted concert hall which was empty except for two old ladies playing Patience. The scene then changed to a dream scenario of a Top of the Pops type performance, with a full backing band and an enthusiastic audience of teenage girls. At the end of the song, the scene switched back again to the seedy concert hall where the singer was shown looking ruefully around him, and then walking off stage. A number of critics appeared to be unaware of the visual references, and remarked on the video's cheap appearance.

"Bring It On" was voted number one for six consecutive weeks on the UK music video channel The Box.

Two separate videos were made for "My Lover's Prayer", the first featured Alistair Griffin acting out a romantic scenario with a girl, the second showed Robin Gibb and Griffin in the recording studio. Neither video was included on the CD singles, and neither was ever released to the music stations. Clips from the second have appeared on several TV programmes and the full version can be viewed on Robin Gibb's official Myspace page.

== Track listing ==
Two different versions of the single were released, both chart eligible. The extended single also included a cover of Take That's "Back for Good" and a video. The artwork for the limited-edition single cover featured a dramatic portrait of Robin Gibb with Alistair Griffin.

Extended single (CD1)

1. "Bring It On" (3.03)
2. "My Lover's Prayer" (duet with Robin Gibb) (3.58)
3. "Back for Good" (3.56)

"Bring It On" (video)

Limited edition single (CD2) (with artwork featuring Robin Gibb)

1. "Bring It On" (3.03)
2. "A Lover's Prayer" (3.58)

== Charts ==
All entries chart with "My Lover's Prayer".

=== Weekly charts ===
Chart (2004)	Peak position
Scottish Singles Sales (Official Charts)	4
UK Singles (Official Charts)	5

=== Year-end charts ===
Chart (2004)	Position
UK Singles (Official Charts Company)	152

== Use in television ==
A live performance of "Bring It On" was shown on Top of the Pops on 9 January 2004. The recorded version has since been played several times on Sky Sports channel as a football anthem. It was also used as for a promo for UK Channel Five's children's programme, Milkshake.

In May 2008, "Bring It On" was also used as the backing track for a TV commercial for Canon E0S 450D cameras in South Korea.
