= Louise Griffiths =

British singer and actress (born 1978)

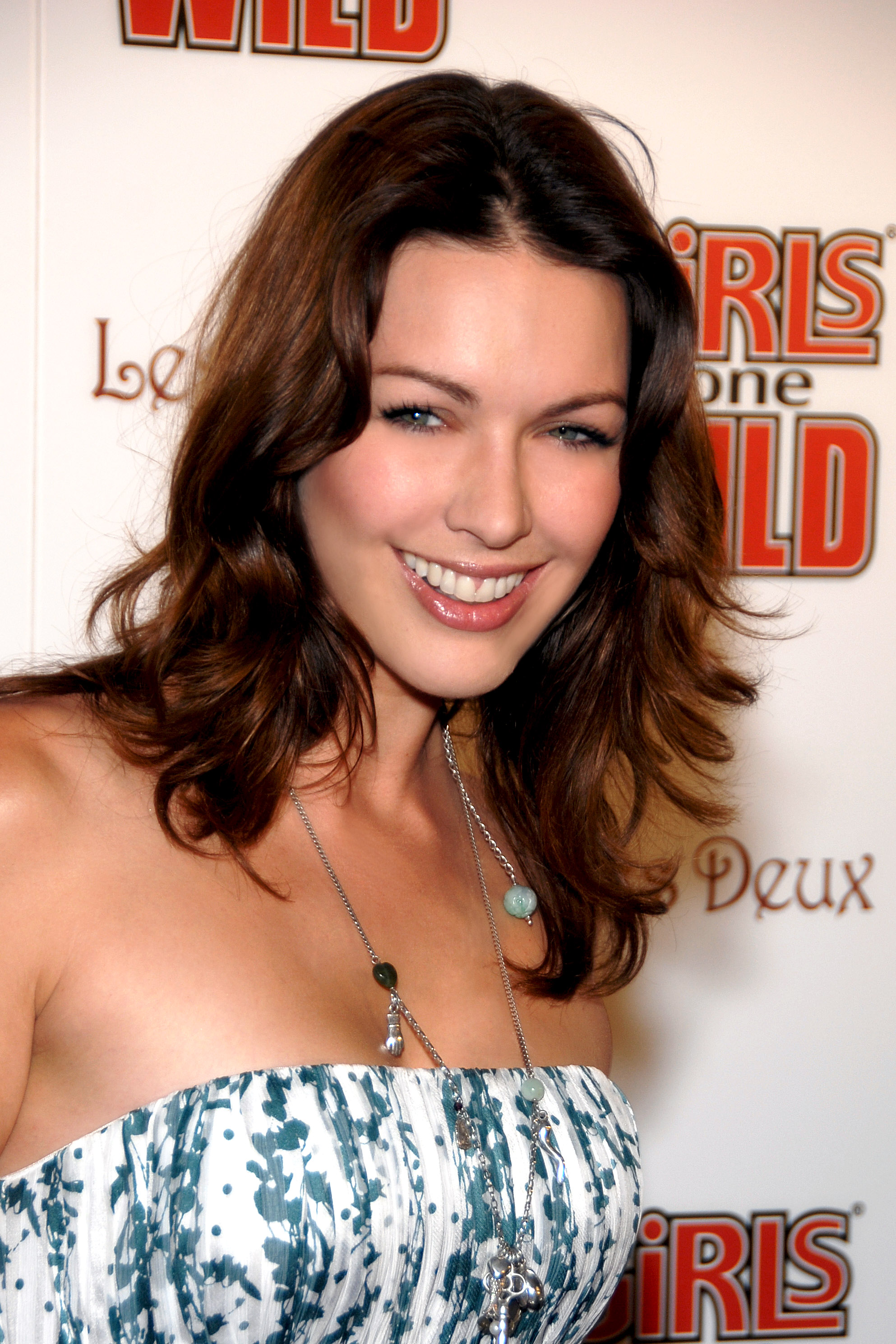
- Griffiths attending the second issue release of "Girls Gone Wild Magazine" Party at Les Deux, Hollywood, 4 June 2008
- Born: 31 July 1978 (age 48); Hertfordshire, England
- Occupations: Singer; songwriter; fashion model; actress
- Years active: 2002–present

Louise Griffiths (born 31 July 1978) is an English singer, songwriter, model and actress.

== Early life ==
Griffiths was born in Hertfordshire, England. She is the daughter of a London taxicab driver. She plays the saxophone, and was a contestant in the BBC television series Fame Academy in 2003.

== Career ==
=== Music ===
Griffiths was a member of an unsuccessful all-female band Orchid, who originally recorded the song "Sound of the Underground" in 2001. However their version was never released, and the song became a hit only when it was subsequently re-recorded and released by Louis Walsh's pop group Girls Aloud.

In 2003, Griffiths was one of the first of four students chosen by the public to appear on the second series of the BBC TV show Fame Academy when it was revealed in the press that she was the girlfriend of Formula One driver Jenson Button. Despite complaints that she was with a celebrity boyfriend and that her former recording and songwriting experience gave her an unfair advantage, she made it to the final eight before being voted out.

Although Griffiths did not get a recording contract after the show, one of the songs she co-wrote with fellow student Alistair Griffin, "A Heart Can't Lie", was included on his debut album Bring It On which reached No. 12 in the UK Albums Chart in January 2004. Shortly after leaving the show it was reported that she had been given an unreleased song by Robbie Williams and Guy Chambers to record, but this was never released.

=== Acting ===
In 2006 Griffiths made her film debut with her role of Melissa in the horror movie The Devil's Chair, directed by Adam Mason. Co-stars include Elize du Toit, Gary Mackay, and Matt Berry. This was premiered at the Cannes Film Festival in May 2007 and was first screened in the UK in August at the 2007 London FrightFest Film Festival.

In April 2008, Griffiths booked her first lead role in the dark comedy feature The Revenant opposite David Anders, Jacy King, and Chris Wylde.

Griffiths also worked alongside Malcolm McDowell and Holly Valance for the video game Command & Conquer: Red Alert 3 in 2009 playing Commander Lydia Winters.

In early 2010, Griffiths had a recurring role in the popular MTV series Warren the Ape.

Griffiths had a supporting role in the film Tekken, which starred Luke Goss and Ian Anthony Dale, who was one of the lead roles in the NBC series The Event. The film also starred the well-known American character actor Cary-Hiroyuki Tagawa.

Griffiths starred in All's Faire in Love, released in October 2011, opposite Christina Ricci, Matthew Lillard, Cedric the Entertainer, and Ann-Margret.

She also played the role of 'Mary Gardocki' on NCIS in episode 21 from Season 9 "Rekindled", which aired on 17 April 2012.

Griffiths played 'Denese Saintclaire' alongside Jaime Pressly in the Axe cleans your balls campaign for Axe shower gel.

Griffiths appears as Josephine White in the film The Mudman released in 2011. Other actors in the film include Time Winters and Samuel Child.

In 2013 Griffiths played Liz Batho / Elizabeth Báthory in the comedy-horror film, Chastity Bites.

== Filmography ==
- The Devil's Chair (2007)
- Alone in the Dark II (2008)
- The Revenant (2009)
- Tekken (2009)
- All's Faire in Love (2009)
- Lovesick (2013)
- Chastity Bites (2013)
- Unknown Caller (2014)
