= Cry (Alex Parks song) =

2004 single by Alex Parks

Single by Alex Parks

from the album Introduction
- Released: 16 February 2004
- Length: 3:49
- Label: Polydor
- Songwriters: Alex Parks, Gary Clark, Boo Hewerdine
- Producers: Gary Clark, Boo Hewerdine

Alex Parks singles chronology
"Maybe That's What It Takes" (2003)	"Cry" (2004)	"Looking for Water" (2005)

"Cry" is the second and final single from English singer-songwriter Alex Parks' debut album, Introduction (2003). The song was released on 16 February 2004, peaking at number 13 on the UK Singles Chart and number 32 on the Irish Singles Chart.

== Music video ==
In the video, Parks is in a London Underground station listening to music, waiting for the train to come. There are also scenes showing her on a beach. Towards the end of the song, she gets off the train and starts running, as does the Alex on the beach. At the end of the song, she is seen walking away.

== Track listings ==
UK CD1

1. "Cry" (album version)
2. "Maybe That's What It Takes" (acoustic)
3. "Wandering Soul" (acoustic)
4. "Cry" (video)
5. "Maybe That's What It Takes" (video)

UK CD2

1. "Cry" (album version)
2. "Chasing the Blue"

== Charts ==
Chart (2004)	Peak position
Ireland (IRMA)	32
Scottish Singles Sales (Official Charts)	15
UK Singles (Official Charts)	13
