= Introduction (Alex Parks album) =

Studio album by Alex Parks
- Released: 24 November 2003
- Genre: Pop
- Length: 48:35
- Label: Polydor
- Producer: Gary Clark; Boo Hewerdine; Simon Hill; Glenn Skinner; Blair MacKichan; Kevin Armstrong

Alex Parks chronology
Introduction (2003)	Honesty (2005)

Introduction is Alex Parks' debut album, released on 24 November 2003. Recorded and released within only two weeks of Parks winning the BBC's Fame Academy, it included seven original compositions, mostly co-written with songwriters Helen Boulding, Gary Clark and Boo Hewerdine, as well as six cover songs from John Lennon, Tears for Fears, R.E.M., Christina Aguilera, Eurythmics and Coldplay.

The album reached number 5 in the UK Top 40 Album charts. It has been classified platinum in the UK.

Introduction includes rock influences on "Dirty Pretty Words" and "Wandering Soul", as well as a folk pop acoustic track, "Not Your Average Kind of Girl".

The lead single "Maybe That's What It Takes" was released on 17 November 2003 and peaked at number 3 in the UK Top 40 the following week. The second single "Cry" was released on 16 February 2004, and charted at number 13.

The song "Stones & Feathers" was adapted in French under the title "De l'Eau" (Some Water) and used as the debut single of Elodie Frégé, winner of the third season of "Star Academy".

== Track listing ==
1. "Maybe That's What It Takes" - 3:54 (Alex Parks, Helen Boulding)
2. "Cry" - 3:49 (Parks, Gary Clark, Boo Hewerdine)
3. "Dirty Pretty Words" - 3:10 (Parks, Clark, Hewerdine)
4. "Imagine" - 3:13 (John Lennon)
5. "Not Your Average Kind of Girl" - 3:37 (Parks, Carolynne Good, James Fox)
6. "Mad World" - 3:03 (Roland Orzabal)
7. "Everybody Hurts" - 5:44 (Bill Berry, Mike Mills, Peter Buck, Michael Stipe)
8. "Beautiful" - 3:59 (Linda Perry)
9. "Stones & Feathers" - 3:07 (Justin Gray, Blair MacKichan, Stefan Skarbek, Parks)
10. "Here Comes the Rain Again" - 3:20 (Annie Lennox, David A Stewart)
11. "Yellow" - 4:30 (Guy Berryman, Jon Buckland, Will Champion, Chris Martin)
12. "Wandering Soul" - 3:31 (Parks, Clark, Hewerdine)
13. "Over Conscious" - 3:37 (Parks, Glenn Skinner, Luciana Caporaso)

== Chart performance ==
In the United Kingdom, Introduction debuted at #5.

== Certifications ==
Region	Certification	Certified units/sales
United Kingdom (BPI)	Platinum	300,000^{^}
^{^} Shipments figures based on certification alone.
