= Bring It On (Alistair Griffin album) =

Studio album by Alistair Griffin
- Released: 12 January 2004
- Recorded: 2003
- Genre: Pop
- Label: UMTV
- Producer: Danny Schogger, Deacon Smith, Ian Curnow

Professional ratings
Review scores
| Source | Rating |
|---|---|
| The Guardian | link |

Bring It On is the debut album by British singer/songwriter Alistair Griffin. Released in January 2004 on the UMTV label, it reached #12 in the UK album charts.

The album consists mainly of original songs written or co-written by Griffin, together with the three most popular covers he had sung live on Fame Academy 2. Also included is the duet of "My Lover's Prayer", featuring Robin Gibb. "A Heart Can't Lie" was co-written with Louise Griffiths, a fellow Fame Academy contestant.

== Reviews ==
Bring It On received mixed reviews, with some critics dismissing it as a product of manufactured reality pop, even though most of the songs had actually been written before Griffin entered the show. Despite being criticised for its bland production, Bring It On was variously described as "ludicrously catchy", "polished pop" and "so cheesy that it is actually cool somehow". Most praised the quality of the songwriting, with one reviewer commenting "...he has come up with a debut that is better than those of his contemporaries. There's no pouting, no worthiness, just gentle pop songs about the flush of first love and the warmth of summer romance.."

== Covers ==
Two of Griffin's own compositions have also been covered by Dutch artists; "You and Me" appears on the #1 album Impressed previously released in 2003 by Jim Bakkum, runner-up in the Dutch series of Pop Idol, and "Hungry For Love" became a hit single for rock band Di-rect in the Netherlands in 2005.

"In Your Smile" and "Feeling Alive", featuring Griffin as guest vocalist, appear on Ultra's second studio album, The Sun Shines Brighter, released October 2006.

== Singles ==
The first single to be released from the album was the double A-side "Bring It On/My Lover's Prayer" (December 2003) which charted at #5 in the UK. The second single, "You and Me (Tonight)" was released in March 2004 and charted at #18. Acoustic versions of "Bring it On" and "In Your Smile", together with a dance remix of the title track were also included as B-sides.

Shortly afterwards, Griffin parted company with UMTV and no further single releases were made.

== Track listing ==
1. "Bring It On" – 3:04 (Alistair Griffin)
2. "Painkiller" – 3:39 (Griffin, Tom Nichols, Greg Fitzgerald)
3. "Oblivion" – 3:21 (Griffin, Stuart Hanna)
4. "You and Me (Tonight)" – 4:16 (Griffin, Nichols, Fitzgerald, Jon O'Mahony)
5. "Hungry for Love" – 3:40 (Griffin, Nichols, Fitzgerald)
6. "Real World" – 4:38 (Griffin, O'Mahony, Michael Harwood, Nick Keynes, Ryan Molloy)
7. "Feeling Alive" – 3:54 (Griffin, O'Mahony)
8. "Something About Her" – 3:35 (Griffin, Hanna)
9. "My Lover's Prayer" – 3:59 (Feat. Robin Gibb) (Barry Gibb, Maurice Gibb, Robin Gibb)
10. "Jealous Guy" – 3:27 (John Lennon)
11. "In Your Smile" – 3:52 (Griffin)
12. "Everything I Own" – 3:03 (David Gates)
13. "Wherever You Will Go" – 3:26 (Aaron Kamin, Alex Band)
14. "A Heart Can't Lie" – 3:12 (Griffin, Louise Griffiths, Danny Schogger)

== Personnel ==
- Alistair Griffin – vocals
- Robin Gibb – vocals
- Lance Bass – vocals
- Peter Brame – vocals
- Carolynne Good – vocals
- Alex Parks – vocals
- Deconzo Smith – keyboards, guitar, bass
- Olly Meacock – programming
- Dave Ford – engineer
