= Looking for Water =

Looking for Water may refer to:

- "Looking for Water" (David Bowie song), a song written by David Bowie in 2003 for his album Reality
- "Looking for Water" (Alex Parks song), the first single from Alex Parks' second album Honesty

== See also ==
- Dowsing, a type of divination employed in attempts to locate ground water
