= Simon Hill (musician) =

- Born: 25 February 1969 (age 57)
- Origin: Bristol, England
- Genres: Funk, soul, rock, jazz, RnB
- Occupations: Musician, songwriter and record producer
- Instrument: Drums
- Years active: 1987–present

Simon Hill (born 25 February 1969, Bristol) is an English musician, songwriter and record producer.

Simon started his career playing drums, recording and touring with bands including JTQ, Kim Wilde, Pet Shop Boys, Westlife and Steps. He has also employed his programming, production and writing talents with an array of top acts, including S Club 7, Victoria Beckham, Emma Bunton, Alex Parks, Natasha Bedingfield, RyanDan, Will Martin, Moya Brennan, Conway Sisters, Steps, Louise Setara, and Connie Talbot. TV writing and production credits include: Fame Academy 2, Celebrity Fame Academy, When Jordan Met Peter, Toughest Place To Be A..., Sunday Morning Live, Janet Saves The Monarchy and Wogan Now & Then. He has also written and produced the theme tunes for Setanta Sports' Premiership, FA Cup and World Cup 2010 Football output. He has composed and produced the Official Broadcast Theme for the 2010 Vancouver Winter Olympics called "City of Ice". In 2011, he produced and re-arranged the official FIFA Anthem.
