= Nick Hall (singer) =

English musician

Nick Hall (born 31 December 1973, Birmingham) is an English singer-songwriter. Hall also plays the guitar, saxophone, piano and many more instruments, including the didgeridoo.

After spending a number of years playing the local music scene in and around the Midlands, he got his first break after appearing on the BBC television series Fame Academy 2 in 2003. After leaving the show, he formed his own band, and continued writing and performing his own material.

In 2005, he was chosen to support Bryan Adams on his UK tour date at the opening of the newly built Ricoh Arena in Coventry. This was closely followed by a support slot with Brian McFadden in October 2005.

In 2006, Hall spent some time in Los Angeles, California, writing and recording, and later that year he signed a significant publishing deal with Reverb Music.
