= Owen Benjamin =

American far right activist (born 1980)

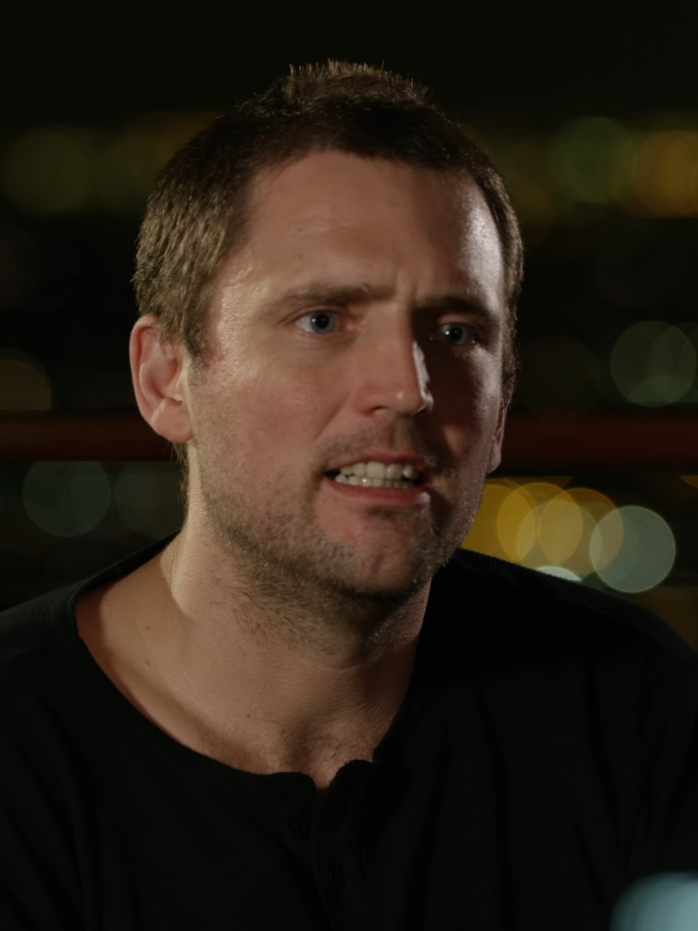
- Benjamin in 2017
- Born: Owen Smith; May 24, 1980 (age 46); Oswego, New York, U.S.
- Education: State University of New York, Plattsburgh (BA)

Comedy career
- Years active: 2006–present
- Medium: Stand-up, television, film, internet
- Genre: Observational comedy
- Website: owenbenjamin.com

Owen Smith (born May 24, 1980) known professionally as Owen Benjamin, is an American conspiracy theorist and internet personality known for promoting white supremacy, anti-Black racism, and anti-LGBTQ rhetoric. According to the Anti-Defamation League, he has endorsed Nazi policies concerning Jews and has denied the Holocaust, and his content is known for being antisemitic.

Benjamin was originally known as a stand-up comedian and actor. He had roles in mainstream film and television between 2008 and 2015. In the late 2010s, Benjamin began expressing more extreme political views. In 2019, he was banned from several mainstream social media platforms for violations of their policies, including Twitter, Facebook, Instagram, and YouTube. These included antisemitic, homophobic, and racist remarks.

== Early life ==
Owen Smith was born to John Kares Smith and Jean Troy-Smith, both professors at Oswego State University. He attended SUNY Plattsburgh, where he worked at the student-run TV station.

== Career ==
=== Acting and stand-up comedy (2004–2018) ===
Benjamin starred in several web-only video series, including in the role of Owen on C-SPOT's 2008 Gaytown and the role of Chance Stevens on CBS Interactive's 2009 Heckle U. He also hosted Owen Benjamin Presents, a 2008 C-SPOT production.

In 2008, Benjamin had a supporting role in the comedy film The House Bunny. In 2009, he played the lead role in the romantic comedy film All's Faire in Love, co-starring with Christina Ricci. From 2012 to 2014, he portrayed Owen Walsh on the TBS original sitcom Sullivan & Son. He also appeared on the MTV show Punk'd and twice as a correspondent on The Jay Leno Show. Benjamin hosted the annual ADG Excellence in Production Design Awards from 2014 to 2016. He hosted Esquire Network's The Next Great Burger in 2015.

Towards the end of the decade, Benjamin had established himself as what conservative commentator Bethany Mandel described as an "up-and-coming conservative comedian", booking comedy shows at university campuses. He hosted a podcast called Why Didn't They Laugh on Sideshow Network. In October 2017, Benjamin tweeted his opposition to providing children who claimed to be transgender with hormone therapy, criticizing NPR host Jesse Thorn for raising his 5-year-old child as transgender. This led the University of Connecticut to cancel an upcoming show, and Benjamin's talent agency dropped him as a client. In February 2018, Benjamin used a racial slur onstage in a performance in his hometown of Saranac Lake, New York, and more venues cancelled appearances. Mandel described these two events as the "beginning of the end of Benjamin's mainstream career".

=== Political commentary (2018–present) ===
Beginning in 2018, Benjamin appeared in two videos for conservative media company PragerU. Since then, Benjamin repeated antisemitic conspiracy tropes, referred to gay sex as "degeneracy", and called Barack Obama a "nigger". He also was a guest on several shows by The Daily Wire, and podcasts including those of Joe Rogan and Steven Crowder. In September 2018, he appeared on InfoWars show, and in December was a guest on a show by Vox Day.

== Views ==
Benjamin is part of the alt-right and has espoused views rooted in white nationalism that are racist and antisemitic. Bethany Mandel has said that Benjamin, who was once a mainstream conservative comedian, became increasingly radicalized towards the end of the 2010s.

Benjamin has expressed support for various antisemitic conspiracy theories. In October 2018, The Atlantic reported that Benjamin had a history of posting antisemitic memes on Instagram. In 2019, Right Wing Watch reported on Benjamin's statement that Adolf Hitler was trying to "clean Germany, clean it of the parasites, of the fleas", and his claims that Jews control the media. Right Wing Watch also reported on one of Benjamin's livestreams, where he said, "gays and Jews were considered the worst of the worst. Why? Because if they get power, they will destroy your entire civilization." Mandel has said that Benjamin has posted fabricated writing from the Talmud and spread antisemitic conspiracy theories, including Holocaust denial.

Right Wing Watch has reported that Benjamin believes in several other conspiracy theories, such as that the transgender rights movement is part of a eugenics program to reduce the world population, that the Moon landing did not occur, and that the existence of dinosaurs was fabricated by the Smithsonian. In November 2019, he spoke at the Flat Earth International Conference in Dallas, Texas. In July 2023, he claimed that the atomic bombings of Hiroshima and Nagasaki, as well as test footage of the bombs, were faked.

=== Social media bans ===
Twitter banned Benjamin in 2018 after he made tweets about gun control advocate David Hogg. His account was later reinstated under the X management. In October 2019, Patreon suspended Benjamin's account, saying he violated their terms of service regarding hate speech. His YouTube channel was banned on December 3, 2019, for violations of the site's terms of service. On December 13, he was suspended from Facebook and Instagram for multiple policy violations. He has also been banned by PayPal.

In January 2020, Benjamin and one hundred of his fans announced their intent to sue Patreon for $3.5 million for banning him from the platform. Patreon counter-sued 72 of the fans. In July 2020, a judge on the San Francisco County Superior Court denied Patreon's request for a preliminary injunction in the case.

In March 2020, The Daily Dot reported that Benjamin had been attempting to circumvent his social media bans on several platforms to spread disinformation regarding COVID-19. Following the publication of the article, several of Benjamin's new accounts were terminated. After being banned from YouTube, Benjamin began streaming on DLive, a livestreaming service popular with extremists. In October 2020, Benjamin and Nick Fuentes were the two highest earners on the site. Following a November 2020 report by extremism researcher Megan Squire, DLive suspended several accounts including those belonging to Benjamin and Fuentes.

== Personal life ==
In March 2008, he and Christina Ricci announced they were engaged, but they ended their engagement two months later. He later married and had children.

In 2021, after Benjamin began working on a project to create a compound on property he owns in Boundary County, Idaho, county residents filed a complaint with the county commissioners over allegations that he had violated zoning provisions while also expressing concerns that he was forming a "Ruby Ridge style" compound on the property.

== Filmography ==
=== Film ===
- 2008: The House Bunny
- 2009: 28 Drinks Later (short)
- 2009: All's Faire in Love
- 2011: Bucky Larson: Born to Be a Star
- 2011: Jack and Jill
- 2015: Staten Island Summer
- 2015: Handjob Cabin (short)

=== Television ===
- 2007: That's My Daughter (TV series)
- 2008–2009: Gaytown (TV series)
- 2010–2011: Pretend Time (TV series, 5 episodes)
- 2014: Six Guys One Car (TV series, 1 episode)
- 2014: The Soul Man (TV series, 1 episode)
- 2012–2014 : Sullivan & Son (TV series)
