= All's Faire in Love =

- Promotional poster
- Directed by: Scott Marshall
- Written by: R.A. White; Jeffrey Ray Wine
- Produced by: Scott Reed; Ron Singer
- Starring: Owen Benjamin; Christina Ricci; Chris Wylde; Matthew Lillard; Cedric the Entertainer; Louise Griffiths; Martin Klebba; Ann-Margret
- Cinematography: Mark Irwin
- Edited by: Josh Muscatine; Tara Timpone
- Music by: Jeff Cardoni
- Release dates: September 17, 2009 (SoCal Independent Film Festival); October 28, 2011 (United States)
- Country: United States
- Language: English

All's Faire in Love is a 2009 American romantic comedy film directed by Scott Marshall and written by R. A. White and Jeffrey Ray Wine. The film stars Owen Benjamin as Will, a college student who is assigned to work at a renaissance fair by his professor (Cedric the Entertainer) after missing several classes, and Christina Ricci as Kate, an investment banker who leaves her job to work at the fair.

The film was shot primarily at the Michigan Renaissance Festival. Local residents, costumed participants and fairegoers were used as extras.

The film was originally titled Ye Olde Times but was renamed in late September 2008. Jack Black and Lindsay Lohan were attached at one point to star in the film.

== Cast ==
- Owen Benjamin as Will
- Christina Ricci as Kate
- Louise Griffiths as Jo
- Chris Wylde as Prince Rank
- Cedric the Entertainer as Professor Shockworthy
- Matthew Lillard as Crockett
- Ann-Margret as Mrs. Banks
- Martin Klebba as Count Le Petite
- Sandra Taylor as Princess Jeanette
- Bill Engvall as Mr. Mendelson
- Dave Sheridan as Jester Roy / Horny
- Peter Ransom as General Tsoe
- Nadine Velazquez as Mathilde

== Production ==
In May 2007, it was announced that Jack Black, Tim Robbins, Cary Elwes, Will Arnett and John C. Reilly were attached to star in a romantic comedy called Ye Olde Times, with R.A. White making his directorial debut based on a screenplay he also wrote. In November 2007, Matthew Lillard, Orlando Jones and David Arquette were reported to have joined the cast of the film, Justin Chatwin being attached to star as the male lead. In March 2008, Lindsay Lohan was announced as the female lead.

In September 2008, Owen Benjamin, Christina Ricci and Cedric the Entertainer stepped in to replace Chatwin, Lohan and Black respectively, with Bill Engvall, Louise Griffiths and Ann-Margret joining the cast in supporting roles. It was also reported that Scott Marshall would replace R.A. White as director, the film being renamed All's Faire in Love.

== Release ==
The North American premiere was at the SoCal Independent Film Festival on September 9, 2009 in Huntington Beach, CA. The film premiered on the grounds of the Michigan Renaissance Festival on September 30, 2009. Two years later, the film was released to Regal Entertainment theaters on October 28, 2011.
