= The Source (2001 film) =

- Directed by: S. Lee Taylor
- Written by: Roger Kristian Jones, S. Lee Taylor
- Starring: Mathew Scollon; Melissa Renée Martin; Edward DeRuiter; Alice Frank
- Music by: Mark David; William Tabanou
- Distributed by: The Asylum
- Release date: December 31, 2001
- Running time: 97 minutes
- Language: English

The Source (also known as The Secret Craft in the United Kingdom and The Surge on DVD in the United States) is a 2001 American science fiction horror film directed by S. Lee Taylor and starring Mathew Scollon, Melissa Renée Martin, Edward DeRuiter, and Alice Frank. The story concerns four teenagers who obtain superhuman powers allowing them to control others.

== Plot ==
The film opens by following a moody goth named Reese, who befriends three other outcasts like him: Zack, a rich nerd; Ashley, Zack's sister; and Phoebe, a flower child. They go to a forest and find a glowing rock. They gain powers from just stepping into its presence, and they use these powers to intimidate and humiliate people who have made fun of them over the years. Zack gains telepathy, Phoebe gains telekinesis/psychokinesis, Ashley gains speech-induced psychic suggestion, and Reese gains the ability to heal or hurt others/himself using his mind.

However, her power goes to Ashley's head; and she begins to take over the school, using mind control. She attacks her brother Zack and tries to kill Phoebe and Reese. They force her to heal Zack, but she forces Phoebe to levitate off the building and drop to the ground. Reese (because of his ability to heal or hurt) takes his own hearing away, when Ashley tries to control him; and he breaks the piece of the rock she had around her neck. He heals Phoebe; but, when they return to destroy the glowing rock, it has disappeared. Ashley is committed to a mental institution; but a former teacher brings her more of the glowing rock. The movie ends with her eyes turning blue, indicating that her powers have returned.

== Main cast ==
- Mathew Scollon as Reese Hauser
- Melissa Reneé Martin as Ashley Bainbridge
- Edward DeRuiter as Zack Bainbridge
- Alice Frank as Phoebe Lewis
- Johnny Venocur as Jerry Hauser
- Ronald Rezac as Principal McKinley
- Roger Kristian Jones as Moss Man
- Steven Glinn as Raimy
- Mark Wood as Mr. Jessup
- David Castro as Lane
- Paul Taviani as Mr. Bartlett
- Anna DeCardi as Miss Dunn
- David Anders as Booji (credited as David Holt)
- Cory Travalena as Bane
- Aaron Deakins as Pugg

== Distribution ==
The film was released in the United Kingdom, under the title, "The Secret Craft", on March 11, 2002, via Third Millennium, while it retained its original title for its television airings on The Horror Channel. In the United States, the film carried the alternative title, "The Surge", for VHS and DVD, with both formats being made available on September 17, 2002, from Alchemy.
