= Maybe That's What It Takes =

2003 single by Alex Parks

Single by Alex Parks

from the album Introduction
- Released: 17 November 2003
- Studio: Atomic, Livingston, Britannia Row, Mayfair (London)
- Length: 3:54
- Label: Polydor
- Songwriters: Alex Parks; Helen Boulding
- Producer: Glenn Skinner

Alex Parks singles chronology
"Maybe That's What It Takes" (2003)	"Cry" (2004)

"Maybe That's What It Takes" is a song by English singer-songwriter Alex Parks, taken from her debut album, Introduction (2003). It was released as her debut single on 17 November 2003, shortly after she won the second series of Fame Academy. The song peaked at number three on the UK Singles Chart and number 26 on the Irish Singles Chart.

== Track listings ==
UK CD single

1. "Maybe That's What It Takes"
2. "Beautiful"
3. "Overconscious"

UK cassette single

1. "Maybe That's What It Takes"
2. "Beautiful"

== Credits and personnel ==
Credits are adapted from the UK CD single liner notes.

Studios

- Recorded at Atomic Studios, Livingston Studios, Britannia Row Studios, and Mayfair Studios (London, UK)
- Mixed at Metropolis Studios (London, UK)

Personnel

- Alex Parks – vocals, writing
- Helen Boulding – writing, backing vocals, piano
- Hussein Boon – guitar
- Julian Emery – guitar
- Seton Daunt – bass, electric guitar
- Steve Davis – bass
- Bobby Irwin – drums
- Glenn Skinner – keyboards, production, engineering, programming
- Ash Howes – additional keyboards, additional production, mixing
- The London Session Orchestra – orchestra
- Mark "Duck" Blackwell – co-production, additional programming
- Keith Uddin – additional engineering
- Alan Branch – vocal recording engineer
- Reece Gilmore – drum programming
- Gavyn Wright – concertmaster
- Simon B Hale – string arrangement
- Blue Source – art direction and design
- Alan Clarke – photography

== Charts ==
=== Weekly charts ===
Chart (2003)	Peak position
Ireland (IRMA)	26
Scotland Singles (OCC)	3
UK Singles (OCC)	3

=== Year-end charts ===
Chart (2003)	Position
UK Singles (OCC)	76
