= Alistair Griffin =

English singer-songwriter (born 1977)

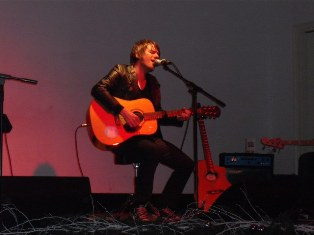
- Griffin performing in 2008

Background information
- Born: Alistair Richard Griffin; 1 November 1977 (age 49)
- Origin: Middlesbrough, England
- Genre: Pop rock
- Occupations: Singer-songwriter, vocalist
- Instruments: Vocals, guitar
- Years active: 2000–present
- Label: Universal UMTV (2003–2004)

Alistair Richard Griffin (born 1 November 1977) is an English singer-songwriter and musician. Already an established songwriter, he first became famous as a solo artist through his appearances on the BBC television show Fame Academy 2 in 2003, where he was mentored by Robin Gibb of the Bee Gees. He subsequently had two top twenty hit singles and a top twenty album in the UK.

== Early career ==
Alistair Griffin was born in Middlesbrough, England. He started singing and writing songs whilst still a student at York St. John College (now York St. John University), playing guitar and busking on the streets of York with a small band. His wide musical influences range from classic rock and Britpop, to English and American folk music. After graduating with a bachelor's degree in English literature and following a brief stint working as a milkman around his home town, he moved to London to pursue a career as a singer-songwriter.

In 2001, as vocalist with the pop/rock band Sugartown, he performed in front of 70,000 people at the Leeds Party in the Park. The following year, he and his occasional songwriting partner, Stuart Hanna (now part of folk duo Megson) formed the band Pulse, and co-wrote the song "Fade Away" (having recorded the song on an 8-track in Hanna's bedroom) and entered it for the 2002 Song for Europe competition on BBC Radio 2. The song was shortlisted, and a performance by Pulse was broadcast, but it failed to reach the finals.

Griffin spent some time working in Germany with DJ Sammy. It was widely reported that he auditioned for the boyband Blue, only narrowly failing to make it to the final line-up, but Griffin later dismissed this as a fabrication by the press. Although signed by music publisher Trevor Horn's company, Perfect Songs, he was unable to get a solo recording contract and in 2002, he applied to become a contestant on the first series of Fame Academy.

== Fame Academy ==
Griffin reached the final audition stage of Fame Academy 1 on his first attempt in 2002, but was not chosen to appear on the show. He re-applied for a place on Fame Academy 2 the following year and was voted through by the public with the highest vote of the preliminary round. The vocal coaches criticized both his voice and image, calling them "unoriginal", "unidentifiable" and "boybandish"; however, guest judge Robin Gibb of the Bee Gees said Griffin had a "unique talent" as a vocalist and songwriter, an "ideal recording voice" with "an engaging vocal tone". His technically accomplished live performances and proven songwriting ability gradually gained him the support of the public. As the final approached, he was dubbed the "dark horse" of the show by BBC Three presenter Claudia Winkleman, and eventually finished in second place.

The final showdown between Griffin and eventual winner Alex Parks was screened live and generated so many angry messages from viewers after Daniel Bedingfield, who duetted with both finalists, made his feelings clear by urging viewers that they should "just vote for Alex". This outburst by Bedingfield led to claims of favouritism. The BBC was forced to close down the Points of View message boards as negative messages just flooded in the board. Bedingfield made a public apology to Griffin for his behaviour and outburst. The actual voting figures have never been publicly released.

== After Fame Academy ==
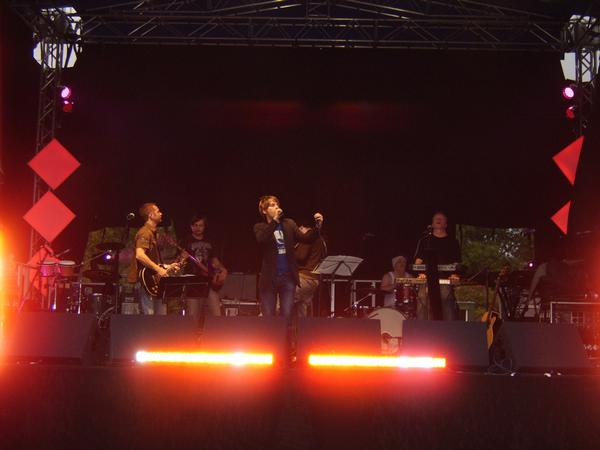
Griffin in 2008

During 2004, Griffin performed live at over 50 gigs up and down the UK and appeared on numerous television programmes, including Top of the Pops and Liquid News. In March of that year, he also competed in the European 'WorldBest' competition in Cannes, singing live with Phil Collins.

The live performances of his own material that he gave throughout that year, singing acoustically and with the backing of a regular 5-piece band, Riccardi, showed a marked difference from the generic 'pop' approach of his record company. After parting from UMTV, he abandoned his record company's 'pop style' backing tracks and his former 'boyband' image.

In the autumn, he supported Robin Gibb on his 'Magnet' tour of Germany, opening each concert with an acoustic set of his own songs, playing guitar and accompanied on keyboards by long-time friend and fellow musician, Simon Waggott (Waggo), as well as joining Gibb on stage to duet on "My Lover's Prayer". On his return, he released an independent recording of his live performances in Germany, which he showcased at a series of concerts in the North of England.

During 2005, Griffin continued to perform live, both solo and with Riccardi, but split with them later that year. He moved back to York and although there were rumours of a new recording deal, nothing materialized. In November, he assembled a new backing band and performed his first London gig for over a year at The Bedford, where he showcased several new compositions.

== Albion ==
In April 2006, Griffin announced that he would shortly be forming a new band, and that he would no longer be pursuing a solo career, but rather be concentrating on working and writing with his new band, that he called Albion. For some time, he performed solo only at charity events and small local venues.

The initial lineup proved unsuccessful, with James and Tom Martin leaving a few months later to form another indie band, The Station Club. At the end of 2006, Griffin (guitar and vocals) and Walter Laybourne (drums), were joined by Paul Banks (Shed Seven) (guitars and keyboard) and Paul 'Foda' Fothergill (bass).

At the beginning of 2007, Griffin set up his own recording studio called Oakwood near York. Despite writing and recording many songs together and releasing several free download tracks, Albion split up abruptly in August 2007 for reasons which were not made public. When interviewed, Griffin commented "Things weren’t working out the way we anticipated and it seemed the right time to call it a day".

=== After Albion ===
When interviewed shortly after disbanding Albion in August 2007, he confirmed his intention to resume recording and performing as a solo artist, although he has since performed several times at society weddings and other functions as well as at charity concerts, fronting his covers band, Blue Nun.

As well as pursuing various other projects, he wrote and recorded material for his next solo album. He performed several of these brand new songs live with his own (unnamed) backing band in May 2008, during a short tour of smaller venues in the UK supporting recently signed indie band Ivyrise.

In August 2008, he headlined the Truck Stage at the H2008:Beached festival in Scarborough and was also booked to return there for Acoustic Gathering 111 in September. UK tour dates with Ivyrise were announced for September as well as an additional appearance at the Grand Opera House, York.

In December 2008, he made an impromptu appearance with David Smith and The Mojos.

== Recordings ==
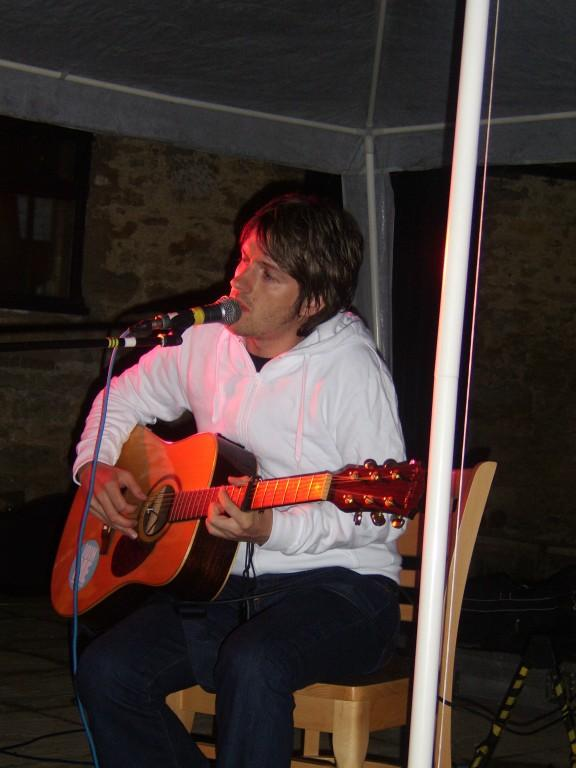
Griffin performing in 2006

In 1999–2000, Griffin recorded several demos of his own compositions which were made available online at Songmanagement.com. These have never been officially released.

In 2002, he recorded the football anthem "Stand Up" which was included in the compilation album Boro Songs – The Sound of the Riverside.

Several covers he recorded for the Fame Academy programme were released as download-only tracks by the BBC during the course of the show in 2003. These were also included in the compilation albums Fame Academy "Bee Gees Special" and Fame Academy – The Finalists, also released in 2003.

In October 2003, Griffin signed a record deal with UMTV and at the end of December released his first single, "Bring It On"; a double A-side also featuring "My Lover's Prayer", a duet with Robin Gibb. Although it received very little airplay, it was voted No. 1 for 6 consecutive weeks on the music TV channel The Box, and reached the top 5 in the UK Singles Chart. On 9 January 2004, he was therefore able to fulfil one of his lifetime ambitions to appear live on Top of the Pops.

In January 2004, he released his debut album, also titled Bring It On, featuring mainly self-penned songs. This charted at number 12 in the UK Albums Chart. His second single, "You and Me (Tonight)", reached the top 20 but Griffin parted with both his record company and management soon afterwards.

In late 2004, he released an independent solo CD, Live in Germany, featuring live recordings of the acoustic set he performed in Germany while supporting Robin Gibb. This included "Bring it On", "You and Me (Tonight)", "In Your Smile" and "I Have Lived" with a cover of "I Can't Make You Love Me". The limited edition CD was only made available for a short time at his concerts.

At his Christmas concert in December 2006, he released another independently recorded, three track solo CD, Finding Boethius, consisting of one co-written song, "Let Love Speak Its Name", a cover of "Hallelujah" which he regularly sings live, and an acoustic cover of "Love Will Tear Us Apart".

Brand new versions of four of the songs which were originally recorded with his former band Albion, but never released, are included on his most recent solo CD Alistair Griffin (May 2008), again produced independently and only available to buy at live concerts during the Ivyrise tour. These are "Blown Away", "I Have Lived", "Silent Suicide" and "Is It Me".

Unreleased demos of his own compositions are regularly previewed on his official Myspace.

Griffin's third single "Just Drive" entered the UK Singles Chart at number 38, after being played in full over the BBC's Formula One montage at the end of the 2010 Abu Dhabi Grand Prix. The track was produced with David Watts at the Oakwood Studios, York. "Just Drive" used to be the title song for Sky Sports' F1 coverage.

In July 2012, he released his second solo album Albion Sky, on the label Dramatico Entertainment.

Griffin's song "Always, No.1" was played in full over the BBC's F1 montage at the end of the 2012 Brazilian Grand Prix and in 2014 was played in a tribute to the F1 driver Jules Bianchi who had an accident months before, in the channel of a Spanish YouTuber called Efeuno (Formula One in English).

Griffin wrote "The Road", the official song of the 2014 Tour de France which he recorded with Girls Aloud's Kimberley Walsh.

Recording "Hallelujah Mark Viduka"

In February 2007, Griffin sang at a charity event at the Riverside Stadium, home of Middlesbrough Football Club. After his performance of Leonard Cohen’s "Hallelujah", he asked the audience if they would like to hear an alternative version, based on Cohen's song, but with new words dedicated to the Boro hero at that time, Australian striker Mark Viduka. Keeping faithfully to Cohen's melody, Griffin's vocals are sung to a simple acoustic backing, forming a contrast to the altered lyrics which reference the particular skills of Viduka and several other popular players in the team, as well as some of their opponents.

After hearing the song, Middlesbrough manager Gareth Southgate was so taken with it, he asked Griffin to make a special recording to play at the following day's match. It was played to the crowd at half-time and to the players in the dressing room after the game.

The BBC Sports Review described the song as the "football anthem of the week, year, decade and possibly all time", and the Irish Times called it "a bit on the excellent side". TV and radio coverage followed. A film of Griffin performing the song with other young Middlesbrough supporters appeared on Sky Sports News, and he also appeared on the BBC's and ITV's regional news programmes. In addition to interviews on local radio stations, Griffin was also interviewed on BBC Radio 5 Live. The song was also broadcast on several channels in Australia and on the BBC World Service.

Southgate embraced the tune as a way of raising money for his chosen charity, Macmillan Cancer Support. Leonard Cohen was approached and gave permission for the song to be released as a charity download.

== Songwriting ==
Griffin's songs cover a wide range of genres, from light pop and romantic ballads to anthemic rock. After recording several demos, he obtained a publishing deal with Trevor Horn's Perfect Songs. He has also co-written songs with a number of other artists, including James Hearn, Michael Harwood, Nick Keynes and Jon O'Mahony of Ultra, Robin Gibb, singer-songwriter Richard Chance, Liverpudlian songwriting duo Chris and Tony Griffiths (of ex-Britpop band The Real People), and Paul Banks (ex Shed Seven).

In 2002, "Fade Away", one of several songs co-written with Stuart Hanna, was shortlisted for the Song for Europe competition. That year Griffin also co-wrote the football anthem "England Crazy" which was recorded by Rider and Terry Venables. He also recorded his own version of the Boro anthem "Stand Up", which was included in the compilation album Boro Songs – The Sound of the Riverside.

Several covers of his earlier songs have achieved notable chart success in the Netherlands. "You and Me" appears on the No. 1 album Impressed, released in 2003 by Jim Bakkum, runner-up in the Dutch series of Pop Idol; Do’s ballad "Angel By My Side" (co-written with James and Tom Martin) reached the Dutch Top 10 in 2004 and "Hungry For Love" (co-written with Greg Fitzgerald and Tom Nichols) was covered by rock band Di-rect, getting to number 3 early in 2005.

Griffin's debut album, Bring It On consisted mainly of songs that he wrote or co-wrote before being signed. During his time in Fame Academy, he also co-wrote several new songs with the students and the songwriters on the show. "Painkiller", (co-written with Greg Fitzgerald and Tom Nichols) along with "A Heart Can't Lie", co-written with fellow student Louise Griffiths, both appeared on his debut album.

He has also written and co-written songs for albums by Phixx (2004), Ultra (2006), Bel's Boys (2007), and Cascada (2009).

In 2005, he resumed his writing partnership with James and Tom Martin. He has since recorded new versions of several of these songs with Albion, which were made available as free downloads on Myspace in 2007.

In 2012, he wrote "I Wish for You the World" for the Games Maker Choir during the 2012 Summer Olympics.The single was released officially on 16 December 2012 as a UK Christmas single on Decca Records. The proceeds from the single went to the British Olympic Foundation and the British Paralympic Association. The song was promoted with videos and messages of support from the mayor of London Boris Johnson and many Olympic athletes, notably rowers Katherine Grainger, Andrew Triggs Hodge and Great Britain Rowers team and by tenor Alfie Boe. Mayor Johnson said about the song: "This song is a great tribute to the feelings of pride, inspiration and goodwill that spread throughout the country during the 2012 Games. I wish everyone involved the best of luck in their efforts in keeping the Olympic spirit alive."

In 2014 Griffin released his 3rd album From Nowhere. He teamed up with Pledge Music allowing people to pre-order his album along with other bits of merchandise. The album featured 2014 Tour de France single "The Road" along with his soon to be released single "Freefall". People who pre-ordered the album known as "Pledgers" received a digital downloadable version of the album in July before general release in September 2014.

== Personal life ==
Griffin was brought up in Castleton, a small moorland village roughly halfway between Middlesbrough and Whitby in North Yorkshire. He has two older sisters. He has retained strong links with his family and his local community and often performs at local events to raise money for good causes. In 2003, without his knowledge, his mother, Barbara Griffin, offered a date with him as a prize in a charity raffle for the Whitby Christmas Lights Appeal. Enough money was raised to light the town for the next three years. A former junior tennis champion, he played tennis and also performed with Riccardi in Sir Cliff Richard's pro/celebrity Tennis Tournament in December 2004.

In March 2017, Griffin's house was partly demolished after the driver of a stolen Audi A4 careered off the road, following a brief chase by police. Although Griffin himself was not at home, his ex-girlfriend and their son were sleeping upstairs at the time of the incident, but all parties were uninjured.

== Discography ==
=== Albums ===
Year	Title	Peak chart positions
Year	Title	UK
2004	Bring It On: Released: 12 January 2004; Formats: CD, digital download	12
2012	Albion Sky: Released: 2 July 2012; Formats: CD, digital download	-
2014	From Nowhere: Released: 7 July 2014; Formats: CD, digital download	-
2016	The Boy, The Rocket And The World: Released: 2016; Formats: CD, digital download	-
2020	Out Of The Dark: Released: 2020; Format: CD, digital download	-
2020	Songs From A Room: Released: 2020; Format: CD, digital download	-
2020	Songs From A Room #2: Released: 2020; Format: CD, digital download	-
2021	Songs From A Room #3: Released: 2021; Format: CD, digital download	-
2022	Forever Today: A Tribute to Robin Gibb Released: 2022 Format: CD, digital download	
2023	Winter Dream: Released: 2023; Formats: CD, digital download	-
2024	Kings and Queens: Released: 2024; Formats: CD, digital download	-

Apart from his Four albums, he has also brought out the EP Mogganaut, containing four tracks.

=== Singles ===
Year	Single	Peak chart positions	Album
Year	Single	UK	Album
2003	"Bring It On/My Lover's Prayer"	5	Bring It On
2004	"You and Me (Tonight)"	18	Bring It On
2007	"Mark Viduka"	—	Non-album release
2013	"What If" (Wimbledon Andy Murray Montage)	—	From Nowhere
2010	"Just Drive"	38	Albion Sky
2011	"Just Drive" (Where There's Muck There's Brass Mix) Ft. The Shepherd Group Brass Band		Albion Sky
2012	"Blinding Lights"	—	Albion Sky
2012	"Always No. 1"	—	Albion Sky
2014	"The One" (featuring Leddra Chapman)	—	From Nowhere
2014	"The Road" (Tour de France – Official Song of the Grand Départ) (featuring Kimberley Walsh)	196	From Nowhere
2015	"Heroes" (Leeds Rhinos – Official Song of Jamie Peacock)	—	Non-album release
2016	"You Only Live Once"	—	The Boy, The Rocket And The World
2018	"England Crazy"	—	Non-Album release
2018	"Only You" (BBC Wedding Montage)	—	Non-Album release
2020	"Into the Dark"	—	Out of the Dark

Featured in

Year	Single	Peak chart positions	Album
Year	Single	UK	Album
2012	"I Wish for You the World" (The Games Maker Choir featuring Alistair Griffin)	70	Non-album release
