= Honestly =

Honestly may refer to:

== Albums ==
- Honestly (Lalah Hathaway album) or the title song, 2017
- Honestly, by Boney James, 2017
- Honestly, by Joey Yung, 2001

== Songs ==
- "Honestly" (Cartel song), 2006
- "Honestly" (Daniel Schuhmacher song), 2009
- "Honestly" (Harem Scarem song), 1992
- "Honestly" (Hot Chelle Rae song), 2012
- "Honestly" (Stryper song), 1987
- "Honestly" (Zwan song), 2002
- "Honestly"/"Honestly (Encore)", by Gabbie Hanna, 2018
- "Honestly?", by American Football from American Football, 1999
- "Honestly", by Charlotte Church from Back to Scratch, 2010
- "Honestly", by Kelly Clarkson from Stronger, 2011
- "Honestly", by LimeLight from Love & Happiness, 2023

== See also ==
- Honesty (disambiguation)
