= Nadja Brand =

South African film actor

- Born: 22 December 1975 (age 50); Johannesburg, South Africa
- Other name: Nadya Brand
- Occupations: Film actress, Director
- Spouse: Adam Mason (divorced in 2006)
- Children: 1 daughter

Nadja Brand (also known as Nadya Brand) is a South African-born actress and producer, most famously known for her leading role in Broken, for which she won the 2007 Fright Meter Award for Best Actress in a Leading Role. (2006). Brand has also starred in The 13th Sign, Dust, and The Devil's Chair.

== Early life and career ==
Brand was born in Johannesburg, South Africa, and later moved to Cape Town to complete her acting studies in 1998. After her marriage to director Adam Mason, she moved to the UK, where she started up her own production company, Paranoid Celluloid, in 2001. She has starred as the lead in 4 internationally released feature films. She has also produced 5 feature films, 65 music videos, and four short films. She recently starred in Arno Carstens' Battlescars Galactica.

== Personal life ==
Brand married director Adam Mason in 2001 and moved to the UK. The couple divorced in 2006. She has a daughter from another relationship. She currently resides in Cape Town, where she acts, produces, and has started her career as a director. Brand has also started her own acting classes in Cape Town.

== Filmography ==
=== Acting ===
Film	Year	Role	Awards
The 13th Sign	2000	Lany	
Dust	2001	Amber Jade	
Prey	2003	Angela	
Broken	2006	Hope	Best Actress award 2007 for her role in Broken
The Devil's Chair	2007	Dr. Clairebourne	
