= Games Maker Choir =

The Games Maker Choir is a choir formed of Games Makers, volunteers who participated in the London 2012 Olympic and Paralympic Games. The choir was set up during the Olympic Games after Victoria Verbi, a university student and Games Maker on the Olympic Park, placed a call for singers in the volunteers' newsletter. Within two days she had more than 200 members and the choir went on to perform at several locations around the Olympic Park and on local radio during the Olympics.

== Performances ==
Following the end of the Olympics and Paralympic Games, selected members of the choir were asked to perform on the Mall at the Our Greatest Team Athletes' Parade held to celebrate the success of Team GB.

In October 2012 the Games Maker Choir was approached by singer-songwriter Alistair Griffin to record a song he had been inspired to write whilst attending the Olympic Games. The song "I Wish For You the World" was released on Decca on 16 December 2012, with proceeds from the single going to the British Olympic Foundation and the British Paralympic Association. On 16 December 2012, specially selected members of the choir performed as part of the coverage of BBC Sports Personality of the Year 2012, performing on BBC Radio 5 Live and on the interactive 'red button'.

The single has received high-profile support from Boris Johnson and gold medalist rowers Katherine Grainger and Andrew Triggs Hodge and the Great Britain Olympic rowers.
