= The Devil's Chair =

- Directed by: Adam Mason
- Written by: Adam Mason; Simon Boyes
- Produced by: Nadja Brand; Eric M. Breiman; Patrick Ewald
- Starring: Olivia Hill; Eric M. Breiman; Gary Mackay; Louise Griffiths; Elize du Toit; Matt Berry; Nadja Brand; Polly Brown; David Gant; Andrew Howard; Graham Riddell
- Cinematography: Ole Bratt Birkeland
- Edited by: Hasse Billing
- Distributed by: Renegade Worldwide
- Release date: 12 September 2007 (Toronto International Film Festival)
- Country: United Kingdom
- Language: English
- Budget: £150,000

The Devil's Chair is a 2007 British horror film. It premiered at the 2007 Toronto International Film Festival.

== Plot ==
The film begins with Nick West lighting a cigarette in the dark and introducing himself to some unknown audience. He proceeds to recount the events he allegedly witnessed, claiming to be a "victim". It is implied that the whole story is told exclusively through his point of view.

Nick brings Sammy to the abandoned Blackwater Asylum to use acid and have sex. They find a weird chair and Nick proposes using it during sex; however the device traps and kills Sammy. Nick is arrested and considered insane, being sentenced to the Hildon Mental Institute in spite of claiming that supernatural forces killed Sammy. Four years later, Cambridge professor Dr. Willard proposes Nick's psychiatrist, Dr. Clairebourne (Nadja Brand), release him under his custody for an experimental treatment: exposing the truth to Nick by bringing him back to the crime scene. Clairebourne opposes, explaining that Nick still has severe delusions, but in the end she accepts. Nick is introduced to Willard, who expresses his desire to write a book about West and his experiences. Willard assumes full responsibility for Nick and alongside his assistant Melissa, and the students Rachel Fowles and Brett Wilson, they return with Nick to the Blackwater Asylum.

Nick begins to feel uneasy when the group enter the asylum, but a sympathetic Rachel tells him that he can leave tomorrow morning if he wants to, promising she won't tell the doctor. The group find the infamous chair. Willard reveals that the asylum warden was known to practice highly controversial methods of treatment. The night nears and Willard tells everyone to go to sleep to have a fresh start tomorrow. In private, he confesses to Nick that the book he wants to write isn't actually about Nick, but about the chair. He admits to believing that Nick's "hallucinations" were actually real events. Willard shows him the warden's journal, from which he learned about the chair: it was used to test the warden's theory about the existence of the human soul. Nick becomes seemingly disturbed, as he says he actually came to believe he killed Sammy, but now isn't sure anymore.

As Nick is trying to sleep, he is approached by Rachel, who wants to prove to him that there is nothing supernatural about the chair. As she sits on it, she accidentally triggers the chair's controls and disappears. She is shown to have been transported into a dark building, where she is hunted by a demonic creature. Melissa persuades a skeptical Brett to sit in the chair, after which she triggers it, sending Brett into the same place as Rachel. Nick then willingly uses the chair to transport himself, believing he can save Rachel. The doctor and Melissa are shown to have plotted this all along. The events unfold quickly as Willard betrays Melissa, forcing her into the chair. He then transports himself. The group reunites as Rachel struggles against the creature. With the rest of the group incapacitated, the doctor subdues Nick and chants incantations, hoping to turn the beast to his side; however, Nick fights him off and, smiling, says that it is he who controls the Demon. It is revealed that the chair itself and the demonic forces were just a product of Nick's imagination. It becomes evident that Nick assaulted the students and the doctor in the asylum, killing Brett. He then proceeds to rape Rachel and kill the doctor and Melissa. Lastly, he kills Rachel as she tries to escape.

After the massacre, a bloodied Nick gets into the car and chats with a woman who looks like Rachel sitting inside, asking her if she minds driving off with a "crazy person". She smiles and kisses him. However, the scene is then revealed to be another of Nick's hallucinations and he is then seen driving away from the asylum alone.

== Score ==
Original music composed by Zoë Keating and Mortiis.

== Production ==
Filming took place at RAF Upwood, a derelict airbase near Ramsey in Cambridgeshire.

== Reception ==
The Devil's Chair received mixed reviews from critics. Dennis Harvey called the film "dumb sensationalism" in a Variety review. David Nusair of ReelFilm.com wrote that it was "a sporadically interesting but mostly interminable little horror flick".

Brendan Willis in a review for Exclaim! wrote that the film was "intelligent and entertaining horror movie". Daniel Hadley of AddictedtoHorrorMovies.com found the film "criminally underrated".
