= Just Drive =

Single by Alistair Griffin

from the album Albion Sky
- Released: 2010
- Genre: Pop rock

Alistair Griffin singles chronology
"You and Me (Tonight)" (2004)	"Just Drive" (2010)	"I Wish for You the World" (2012)

"Just Drive" is a song recorded by British singer/songwriter Alistair Griffin. It is his first official single since "You and Me (Tonight)" in 2004. It was released as a single in November 2010.

The song was used by the BBC at the end of their coverage of the 2010 Abu Dhabi Grand Prix, in a montage showing highlights of the Formula One season.

A re-recorded version (replacing the lyrics "died a thousand times" with "lived a thousand lives") was used as the theme tune for Sky Sports F1's coverage from the 2012 season to 2018, when it was replaced for the 2019 season by Daft Punk's Outlands track from the Tron Legacy Soundtrack.

It was also featured on the end credits in the F1 2012 video game.

== Charts ==
Chart (2010)	Peak position
UK Indie (Official Charts)	4
UK Singles (Official Charts)	38
