= I Wish for You the World =

"I Wish For You the World"

Single by Games Maker Choir featuring Alistair Griffin
- Released: 16 December 2012
- Recorded: October 2012
- Length: 3:16
- Label: Decca
- Songwriters: Alistair Griffin, Richard Chance
- Producers: David Watts, Richard Chance, Alistair Griffin

Alistair Griffin singles chronology
"Just Drive'" (2010)	"I Wish For You the World" (2012)	"The Road" (2014)

Music video
- "I Wish For You the World" on YouTube

"I Wish For You the World" is a 2012 song by Games Maker Choir featuring Alistair Griffin. It was composed on the occasion of 2012 Summer Olympics by Griffin and songwriter/composer Richard Chance, who writes music for television and film. The single was released officially on 16 December 2012 as a UK Christmas single on Decca Records. The proceeds from the single went to the British Olympic Foundation and the British Paralympic Association.

The song was promoted with videos and messages of support from the then-mayor of London Boris Johnson and many Olympic athletes, notably rowers Katherine Grainger, Andrew Triggs Hodge and Great Britain Rowers team and by tenor Alfie Boe.

Mayor Johnson said about the song:

This song is a great tribute to the feelings of pride, inspiration and goodwill that spread throughout the country during the 2012 Games. I wish everyone involved the best of luck in their efforts in keeping the Olympic spirit alive.

== Background ==
The Games Maker Choir had been put up during the Olympics when Victoria Verbi, a university student and Games Maker on the Olympic Park, placed a call for singers in the volunteers' newsletter. Within two days she had more than 200 members and the choir went on to perform at several locations around the Olympic Park and on local radio during the Olympics.

Alistair Griffin wanted to record a song he had been inspired to write whilst attending the Olympic Games and knew about the existence of the choir and invited them in October 2012 to take part in the recording.

Griffin says about his choice of the choir:

The idea and the sentiment of the song is about giving something back. Everyone involved hopes it will keep the Olympic spirit alive.
I wrote the song after being so affected by the Olympics, to reflect the amazing year we've had as a nation, and when I heard the Games Maker Choir I knew they had to sing it. They're the people who made the games and this is the people's song.

A select group of elite members of the 400 strong Choir held a rehearsal in The Actors Workshop in Covent Garden and the final recording was in Angel Recording Studios in Islington, London.

== Support ==
The single received high-profile support from Boris Johnson.

On 16 December 2012, the choir performed it as part of the coverage of BBC Sports Personality of the Year 2012, performing on BBC Radio 5 Live.

== Charts ==
Chart (2012)	Peak position
UK Singles (Official Charts Company)	70
