= Chris Wylde =

American actor (born 1976)

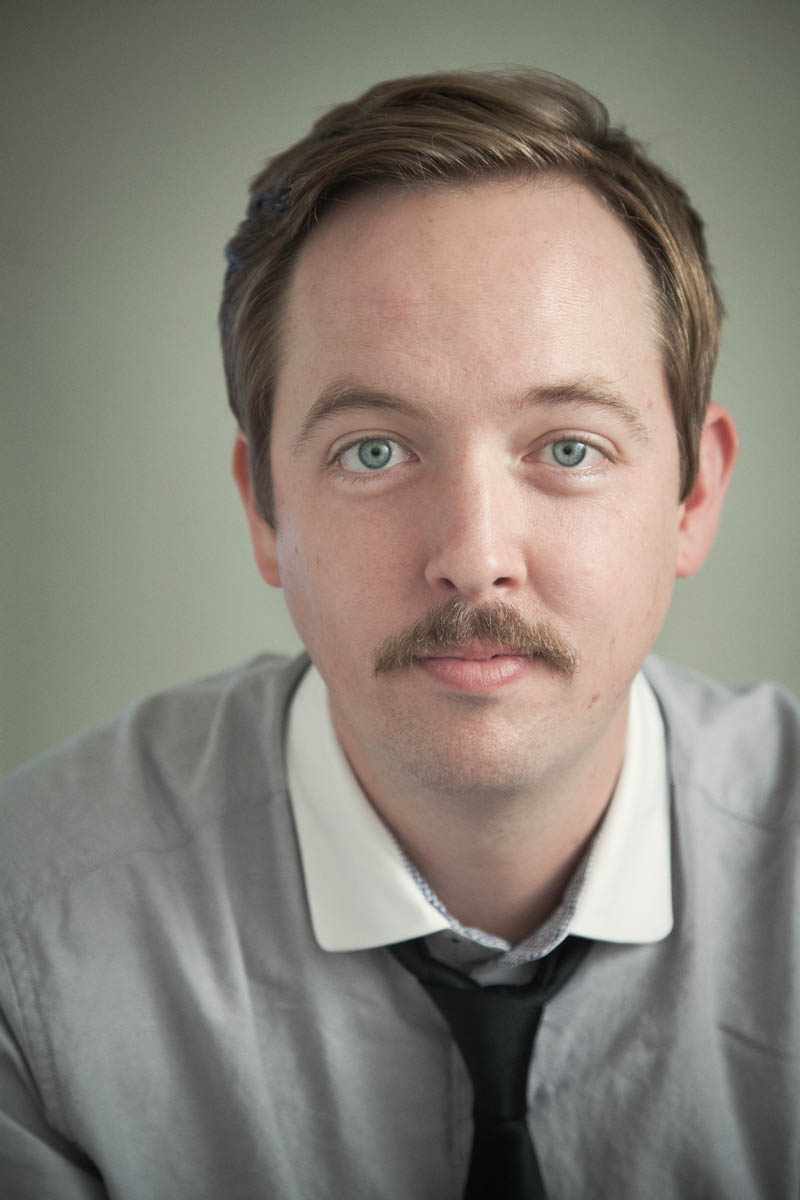
- Wylde in 2011
- Born: Chris Noll; August 22, 1976 (age 48); Hackettstown, New Jersey, U.S.
- Education: American University
- Occupation: Actor
- Years active: 2000–present
- Children: 1
- Website: http://www.youtube.com/chriswyldeforever

Chris Wylde (born Chris Noll, August 22, 1976) is an American actor from New Jersey.

Wylde is best known for his roles in the films The DUFF, Space Cowboys, the 2009 horror film The Revenant, the 2017 horror comedy The Babysitter and its 2020 sequel The Babysitter: Killer Queen. He had his own show on Comedy Central and has guest starred on numerous shows on the Disney Channel. Wylde created, writes, produces and stars in the web series Dadholes. He has recurring roles on Amphibia as Angwin, Young Sheldon as Glenn the owner of the comic book store and The Cuphead Show! as Ribby.

== Early life ==
Wylde was born in Hackettstown and grew up in Belvidere, Verona, and Allendale, New Jersey, where he attended Northern Highlands Regional High School. Both of Wylde's parents were Methodist ministers. He was a treble in the Saint Thomas Choir of Men and Boys and attended the Saint Thomas Choir School in New York City, New York during his early years. Wylde attended American University.

== Career ==
While living in Washington D.C. and attending A.U. he starred in the PBS series Standard Deviants.

After graduating college Wylde moved to Hollywood. He began his television career on the Comedy Central show Strip Mall with fellow comedians Julie Brown and Victoria Jackson, followed by the network's first late-night talk show, The Chris Wylde Show starring Chris Wylde.

He went on to appear in television guest roles, notably pranking the judges on American Idol with his "Rapping Nanny" character (under his given name, Christopher Noll).

Wylde had minor roles in films such as Space Cowboys, Joe Dirt and Coyote Ugly. He later starred in the horror film The Revenant (2009) and The DUFF.

Wylde has a recurring role on Young Sheldon as Glenn, the owner of the comic book store. He also writes, produces and stars in the web series Dadholes.

Wylde has appeared in seven films produced by McG: The DUFF, The Babysitter, When We First Met, Rim of the World, The Babysitter: Killer Queen, Tall Girl 2 and Way of the Warrior Kid.

== Personal life ==
Wylde is a Los Angeles Clippers fan, and met his wife at a Clippers game. Since 2012, Wylde hosts ClipCast with Henry Dittman, the longest running Clippers podcast.

== Filmography ==
=== Film ===
Year	Title	Role	Notes
2000	Space Cowboys	Jason	
2000	Coyote Ugly	College Guy	
2001	My First Mister	Waiter	
2001	Joe Dirt	Railroad Boy	
2001	Evolution	Student	
2007	The Ten	Kevin Lipworth	
2007	Descent	Chris	
2009	The Revenant	Joey	
2009	All's Faire in Love	Prince Rank	
2010	Fred: The Movie	Security Guard	
2011	Fred 2: Night of the Living Fred	Security Guard	
2013	Coffee, Kill Boss	Chuck Quinn	
2014	Earth to Echo	Security Guard	
2014	Teenage Mutant Ninja Turtles	Chris Cummings	
2015	The DUFF	Mr. Fillmore	
2017	The Babysitter	Juan	
2018	When We First Met	Mr. Costigan	
2019	Airplane Mode	Co-Pilot Penis, Benji	
2019	Rim of the World	Uncle Chris	
2020	The Babysitter: Killer Queen	Juan	
2022	Tall Girl 2	Corey Dunkleman	

=== Television ===
Year	Title	Role	Notes
2000–01	Strip Mall	Barry	22 episodes
2001	The Chris Wylde Show Starring Chris Wylde	Chris Wylde	11 episodes
2002	Watching Ellie	Production Assistant	
2002	Trading Spaces	Himself	
2003	Taboo!	Host	44 episodes
2003	Filmfakers	Ensemble	6 episodes
2003	Hollywood Squares	Himself	5 episodes
2003	Just Shoot Me!	Max	
2004	General Hospital	Ricky	3 episodes
2005	American Idol	Rapping Nanny	
2010	Jonas	Mad Mad Marty	
2010	Pair of Kings	Two Peg	2 episodes
2011	Good Luck Charlie	Corporal Kwikki	
2011	A.N.T. Farm	Mr. Marceau	
2012	Gravity Falls	Additional Voices	
2014	Legit	Gene	2 episodes
2014	Hell's Kitchen	Himself	Episode: "7 Chefs Again"
2014	Jessie	Grover/Lord Thunderblood	
2015	Happyish	Hitler	
2015-2017	Pickle and Peanut	Gary/Viper/Various Voices	6 episodes
2016	Future-Worm!	Bread Baron (voice)	
2017	Dimension 404	Detective	
2018-2019	Young Sheldon	Glenn	3 episodes
2020-2022	Amphibia	Angwin/FBI Boss/Newt Marauder (voice)	3 episodes
2022	The Conners	Parrot (voice)	
2022	The Cuphead Show!	Ribby (voice)	6 episodes
2024	Hailey's On It!	Finn Skulby (voice)	Episode: "The Umpire Strikes Back"
