= David Anders =

American actor (born 1981)

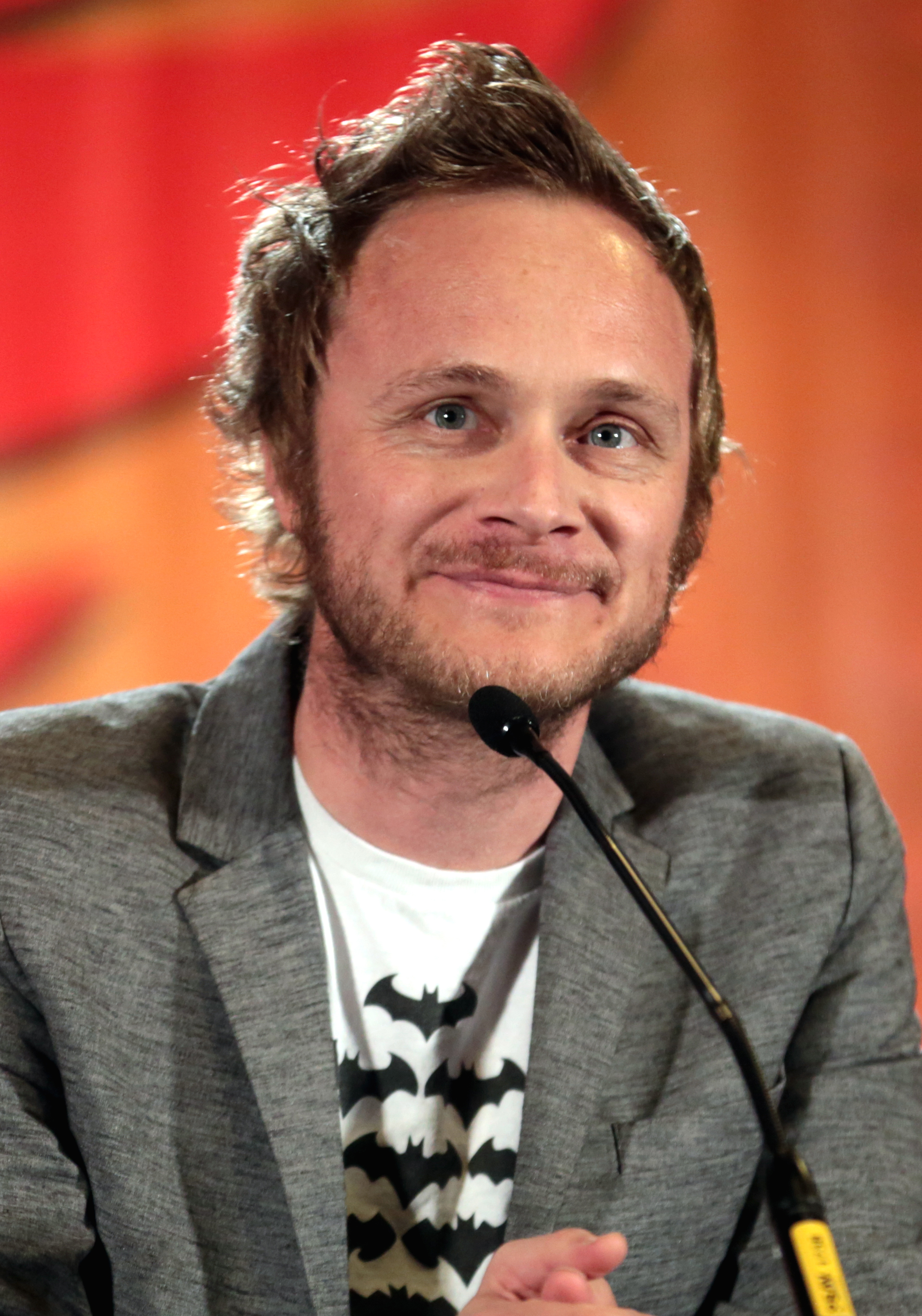
- David Anders at Phoenix Comicon 2017
- Born: David Anders Holt; March 11, 1981 (age 45); Grants Pass, Oregon, U.S.
- Occupation: Actor
- Years active: 2001–present

David Anders Holt (born March 11, 1981), known professionally as David Anders, is an American television and stage actor. He is best known for his roles as Julian Sark on Alias, as Adam Monroe on Heroes, as John Gilbert in the TV series The Vampire Diaries, as Victor Frankenstein / Dr. Whale on ABC's Once Upon a Time, and as Blaine "DeBeers" McDonough on iZombie. Although Anders is American, a few of his roles have required him to use a British Home counties accent.

== Early life ==
Anders was born in Grants Pass, Oregon, to Dr. Tony and Jeri Holt. He has three older siblings: a biological brother (Arik), a brother (Jason), and a sister (Maili). He is of English and Norwegian descent.

Anders began acting in school plays at a young age but spent most of high school playing sports such as basketball and tennis. When he was a senior in high school, at 15, he played Philip the Apostle in a regional theater production of Jesus Christ Superstar. When he was 18 Anders won the part of George in his high school's production of Our Town, then went on to portray Freddy Eynsford-Hill in a production of My Fair Lady.

== Career ==
After moving to Los Angeles, he took the stage name of David Anders as another actor used the name David Holt. In 2001, he played a high school senior in the Olsen twins' series So Little Time. Later in 2001, he landed the role of Julian Sark in Alias; originally a guest star, Anders was made a regular and lasted until 2006. Before his acting debut in Alias, Anders worked at The Gap and taught tennis. Between 2001 and 2006, while working on Alias, Anders made guest appearances on television shows such as Charmed, CSI and Grey's Anatomy. Anders also worked in independent film, and was involved in several plays. In 2002, he played in the independent film, The Surge. In December 2001, he appeared in The Source magazine in an ad for the rapper Canibus, in which Anders doubled as Eminem. In 2005, Anders joined the cast of Beautiful, an Off-Broadway rock musical, as the lead. Beautiful was shown during the New York International Fringe Festival. In the same year, he participated in the film Circadian Rhythm. In 2006, Anders worked on the horror film Left in Darkness alongside actress Monica Keena. In 2007, Anders played the role of ELI in the film of the same name, ELI.

He was then cast in a regular role in the second season of NBC's hit Heroes as Adam Monroe/Takezo Kensei, a character with the ability to regenerate. Anders, playing a British character, was once again called upon to use his British accent from Alias.

He also worked on two other movies: Into the Blue 2: The Reef and The Revenant. He also guest-starred in the eighth season of 24. He guest starred as John Gilbert in the TV series The Vampire Diaries in 2010 and 2011.

As of late 2011, Anders had a recurring role as Victor Frankenstein (as well as his Storybrook version Dr. Whale) on ABC's Once Upon a Time. Anders starred as Troy Cutler in USA's Necessary Roughness and continued his role in Once Upon a Time in Season 3. Since 2015, he has portrayed Blaine DeBeers in the US series IZombie. He also returned to Once Upon a Time for a quick walk-on scene in 2015, and again in 2016. In 2017 he returned for a nonspeaking cameo in the series finale of The Vampire Diaries.

In June 2017, Anders revealed that "for kicks" he was in the process of recording his first album. The album, as revealed by Anders on Twitter, was produced by musician/producer David Poe. The EP was self released by Anders in limited quantities, with the single "Above Below" being made available for streaming alongside its music video (a tribute to Anders' late father) on October 20, 2022.

=== Stage ===
On stage Anders has played the lead role in the world premiere of Rockne: The Musical. He also appeared in The Diary of Anne Frank, in 2001, which received an award for Best Ensemble performance at the Back Stage West Garland Awards. In June 2018 Anders performed in along with Ruth Connell, Rob Benedict, and Jason Watkins. The play was presented as part of the 26th Annual Young Playwrights Festival.

== Charity work ==
In 2006, Anders became a part of Alias and Heroes co-star Greg Grunberg's band, Band From TV. He sang main vocals alongside Bonnie Somerville. Hugh Laurie (House) on keyboards and James Denton (Desperate Housewives) on guitar were also part of the project. The band's main goal was to raise money for major charities; according to Grunberg, they "charge an incredible amount of money to play corporate events, but if it's all going to charity, then it's worth every dime".

In 2015 Anders appeared in a video promoting Stop-Attack, an app that aims to raise awareness and end domestic abuse. Anders was one of over 125 celebrities who supported the app, along with its equity owner Christina Milian.

== Filmography ==
=== Film ===
| Year | Title | Role | Notes |
|---|---|---|---|
| 2002 | The Source | Booji | |
| 2005 | Circadian Rhythm | Garrison | |
| 2006 | Left in Darkness | Donovan | Direct-to-video |
| 2007 | ELI | ELI | Short film |
| 2009 | Into the Blue 2: The Reef | Carlton | Direct-to-video |
| 2009 | The Revenant | Bart Gregory | |
| 2011 | The Maiden and the Princess | Hammond | Short film |
| 2011 | Archetype | RL7 (voice) | Short film |
| 2012 | Neighbors | Timothy Longshanks | Short film |
| 2024 | A Christmas in New Hope | Buddy Stevens | |

=== Television ===
| Year | Title | Role | Notes |
|---|---|---|---|
| 2001 | So Little Time | Senior High School Student | Episode: "Rules of Engagement" |
| 2002–06 | Alias | Julian Sark | Recurring role |
| 2004 | Alias | Mr. Sark (voice) | Video game |
| 2004 | CSI: Crime Scene Investigation | Travis Watson | Episode: "Crow's Feet" |
| 2005 | Charmed | Count Roget | Episode: "Show Ghouls" |
| 2005 | CSI: Miami | Brian Miller | Episode: "Felony Flight" |
| 2006 | Deadwood | Infantryman | Episode: "The Catbird Seat" |
| 2007 | Grey's Anatomy | Jim | Episodes: "The Other Side of This Life: Parts 1 & 2" |
| 2007–10 | Heroes | Adam Monroe (Takezo Kensei) | Main role |
| 2009 | Lie to Me | Staff Sgt. Russell Scott | Episode: "Moral Waiver" |
| 2009 | Children of the Corn | Burton Stanton | TV film (SyFy) |
| 2010 | 24 | Josef Bazhaev | Recurring role, 6 episodes |
| 2010 | Warehouse 13 | Jonah Raitt | Episode: "Where and When" |
| 2010 | Undercovers | Matthew Hunt | Episode: "Assassin" |
| 2010–14, 2017 | The Vampire Diaries | John Gilbert | Recurring role, 13 episodes |
| 2011–16 | Once Upon a Time | Victor Frankenstein / Dr. Whale | Recurring role, 15 episodes |
| 2012 | House | Bill Koppelman | Episode: "Nobody's Fault" |
| 2013 | Arrow | Cyrus Vanch | Episode: "Betrayal" |
| 2013 | Necessary Roughness | Troy Cutler | Recurring role, 8 episodes |
| 2013 | Criminal Minds | Anton Harris | Episode: "To Bear Witness" |
| 2015 | Stalker | Darren Tyler | Episode: "Love Hurts" |
| 2015–2019 | iZombie | Blaine "DeBeers" McDonough | Main role |
| 2016 | Comedy Bang! Bang! | Loki | Episode: "Kaley Cuoco Wears a Black Blazer and Slip on Sneakers" |
| 2020 | The Magicians | Visigoth overlord Terence | Episode: "Magicians Anonymous" |
| 2020 | Roswell, New Mexico | Travis and Trevor | Episode: "Sex and Candy" |
| 2022 | Magnum P.I. | Ray Nasano | Episode: "Close to Home" |
