= Honest (soundtrack) =

Soundtrack album by Various artists
- Released: May 29, 2000
- Genre: R&B/soul
- Label: Island Def Jam
- Producer: Teese Gohl, Steve McLaughlin, et al.

Professional ratings
Review scores
Source	Rating
Allmusic	link
Encyclopedia of Popular Music	2/5 stars

Honest is the soundtrack of the 2000 feature film Honest, directed by ex-Eurythmics member David A. Stewart.

== Track listing ==
#	Title	Artists
1.	"Take A Stroll Thru Your Mind"	The Temptations
2.	Dialogue	
3.	"It's A Desperate Situation"	Marvin Gaye
4.	Dialogue	
5.	"Stop! In the Name of Love"	The Supremes
6.	Dialogue	
7.	"Ain't Nothing Like the Real Thing"	Marvin Gaye and Tammi Terrell
8.	Dialogue	
9.	"Runaway Child, Running Wild"	The Temptations
10.	Dialogue	
11.	"Reflections"	Diana Ross & the Supremes
12.	Dialogue	
13.	"I'm Gonna Make You Love Me"	Diana Ross & the Supremes and The Temptations
14.	Dialogue	
15.	"You Really Got a Hold on Me"	The Miracles
16.	Dialogue	
17.	"This Old Heart of Mine (Is Weak For You)"	The Isley Brothers
18.	Dialogue	
19.	"You're All I Need to Get By"	Marvin Gaye and Tammi Terrell
20.	"You're All I Need to Get By"	Natalie Appleton and Bootsy Collins
21.	"Reflections"	Nicole Appleton
22.	"My Cherie Amour"	Melanie Blatt

== See also ==
- Honest (movie)
