= You and Me (Tonight) =

Single by Alistair Griffin

from the album Bring It On
- Released: March 2004
- Recorded: London, England
- Genre: Pop
- Length: 3.44
- Label: UMTV
- Songwriters: Griffin, Tom Nichols, Fitzgerald, Jon O'Mahony

Alistair Griffin singles chronology
"Bring It On" (2003)	"You and Me (Tonight)" (2004)	"Just Drive" (2010)

"You and Me (Tonight)" is the second single release from English singer Alistair Griffin from his debut album Bring It On (2004).

"You and Me" is a romantic ballad, originally written several years earlier by Griffin and Ultra bandmate Jon O'Mahony. Griffin had never intended to record the song himself, and it was used as an album track by Dutch Idols runner-up Jim Bakkum. His album, Impressed released in August 2003, charted at #1 in the Netherlands.

In late 2003 Griffin recorded his own version for inclusion on his debut album, (released in January 2004 on the UMTV label) with additional writing credits by Tom Nichol and Greg Fitzgerald, and the song was re-titled "You and Me (Tonight)".

== Single release ==
Two different versions of the single were released in the UK in March 2004. Both include the title track (a shorter radio edit of the album track), but each has different B-sides, none of which had previously appeared on the album.

CD 1 includes an acoustic version of "In Your Smile", also written by Griffin. CD 2 includes an acoustic version of his first single, "Bring It On" together with an extended dance mix of "You and Me Tonight" and a video.

The single entered the UK top 20 at #18, despite mixed reviews and very little airplay. The extended dance mix by Kenny Hayes (aka Clubstar) proved very popular in the clubs, and the track was included under the artist name "AG vs Clubstar" in the original Floorfillers compilation album, Floorfillers - 40 massive hits from the clubs, released in August 2004. It was also included on the Abercrombie & Fitch in-store playlist.

== Track listing ==
CD 1

1. You and Me (Tonight) (Radio mix) 3:44
2. In Your Smile (Acoustic) 3:14

CD 2

1. You and Me (Tonight) (Radio mix) 3:44
2. Bring It On (Acoustic) 3:05
3. You and Me (Tonight) A.A.T.W mix) 8:30
4. You and Me (Tonight) (Video)

== Charts ==
Chart (2004)	Peak position
UK Singles (Official Charts)	18
