= Honestus =

Honestus may refer to:

- Saint Honestus, martyred at Pamplona 270 AD.
- A character from The Black Arrow: A Tale of the Two Roses.

== See also ==
- Honesty
- Peter de Honestis
