= Fame Academy series 2 =

Fame Academy
- Series 2
- Hosted by: Patrick Kielty; Cat Deeley
- Judges: Richard Park; Carrie Grant; David Grant; Robin Gibb; Jonathan Ross (final)
- Winner: Alex Parks
- Runner-up: Alistair Griffin

Release
- Original network: BBC One
- Original release: 26 July – 4 October 2003

Series chronology
- ← Previous; Series 1

This second series of Fame Academy was broadcast in the UK over thirteen weeks from July to October 2003. It was won by Alex Parks. The judging panel of the show consisted of Richard Park, Carrie Grant, David Grant and Robin Gibb during the live shows. Jonathan Ross was a judge on the final giving his opinions on the acts.

== Series summary ==
=== Changes to format ===
The second series of Fame Academy incorporated some format changes from series 1. Cat Deeley and Patrick Kielty continued as lead presenters. Songwriting teacher, Pam Sheyne, did not return, and the role of dance teacher, Kevin Adams, was reduced. Headteacher, Richard Park, adopted a nasty, Simon Cowell-style persona. Carrie Grant's husband, David Grant, joined the series as an extra voice coach. Bee Gee Robin Gibb joined the show as a judge for the live shows. The judging panel held the casting vote in the event of a draw.

The live 'singing for survival' shows were moved to Saturday nights. Instead of taking place at Shepperton Studios, they took place at the Academy itself, on a tiny stage in the entrance hall to Witanhurst, with the audience of family and friends positioned on the staircases above. Highlight shows were axed from BBC One, and broadcast on BBC Three. Round-the-clock streaming was available on Freeview, as before, but without any interactive features.

For the first two weeks, the final 25 contestants performed and the public voted for 13 to enter the Academy. Six contestants performed in each of these four shows (seven in the first) with the two (three in the first show) with the most votes from the public gaining a place in the Academy and the two with the fewest votes being eliminated. The fate of the remaining two was decided by the students who had already qualified, with one of the two being 'saved' and given a place in the Academy.

The elimination mechanism for the rest of the series was also changed, apparently in order to compete with Pop Idol. The public were asked to vote for their favourite contestants from across the field. The three with the fewest public votes were then deemed to be "at risk". At this tense moment in the showdown each week, the judges would vote to save one, and then the students were required to vote to save one of the remaining two, and to state the reasons for their choice. This system — considered to be distasteful by many viewers — was used until the penultimate week, from which point the judges no longer had a vote. For the Final Three, the outcome was entirely in the hands of the viewing public.

As a result of this, the content of the live shows also changed. With each student singing for survival every week there was less time available to showcase the students' other performing skills. Duets and group songs, and the students' own compositions, could not be included in the show until later in the series when fewer contestants remained. The change of venue to a much smaller space also limited students to more static performances.

=== The students ===
This series' contestants were in order of elimination:

- Audley Anderson
- Nick Hall
- Lorna Grant
- Gary Phelan
- Simone Stewart
- Louise Griffiths
- Barry McKeever
- Paris Campbell-Edwards
- James Fox
- Peter Brame
- Carolynne Good
- Alistair Griffin
- Alex Parks

The series started controversially, as it was revealed that several of the contestants already had songwriting contracts, although none were actually signed to recording contracts.

Highlights shown on the live streaming included late-night singing sessions around the piano; Peter's outrageous behaviour on his trips outside the Academy, his rows with Kevin, and his later relationship with Carolynne; Alex and Carolynne being punished for communicating off camera; Alistair getting drunk, climbing into Louise's bed, and apologising the following day; and the finalists' last evening which culminated in a game of 'Truth or Dare' with Alistair stripping to his shirt.

=== The Final ===
Alex won the series, beating Carolynne and finally Alistair in the final showdown.

The final of the competition was shown as two separate live programmes, to allow viewers to cast their votes for the last two contestants during the interval. The first show was aired at 6.30pm. Viewers were then able to vote for their favourite and the contestant with the fewest votes was eliminated, with the two winners going on to the final showdown which began later the same evening at 9.30pm.

On the first showdown each of the three contestants performed two songs – one new cover and the student's favourite song that they had performed during the series. The series judges were joined by guest judge, radio and TV presenter Jonathan Ross, and gave their opinions on air.

Alistair and Alex were voted through to the final, and each performed another cover song chosen by the producers; Alex sang a John Lennon song, "Imagine"; Alistair sang "Everything I Own" by Bread. They each performed one of their own compositions, and performed two duets with each other and with guest singer Daniel Bedingfield. Paul McCartney also made an appearance to introduce Alex and Alistair's duet of the Beatles song "Let It Be".

The judges again gave their opinions of each contestant on air and guest celebrities in the invited audience were also asked to comment on the performances. The contestant who gained the most viewers' votes by the end of the programme was then declared the winner.

== Results summary ==
	Heat 1	Heat 2	Heat 3	Heat 4	Week 1	Week 2	Week 3	Week 4	Week 5	Week 6	Week 7	Week 8	Week 9	Week 10	Week 11 The Final
Alex Parks	N/A	N/A	N/A	Advanced; Public Vote	Safe	Safe	Safe	Safe	Safe	Safe	Safe	Safe	Safe	Safe	Winner
Alistair Griffin	Advanced; Public Vote	N/A	N/A	N/A	Safe	Safe	Safe	Safe	Safe	Students Vote	Safe	Safe	Safe	Safe	Runner Up
Carolynne Good	Advanced; Public Vote	N/A	N/A	N/A	Safe	Safe	Safe	Safe	Students Vote	Safe	Safe	Students Vote	Judges Vote	Students Vote	Third Place
Peter Brame	N/A	Advanced; Public Vote	N/A	N/A	Safe	Safe	Safe	Safe	Safe	Judges Vote	Safe	Judges Vote	Students Vote	Eliminated	Eliminated (Week 10)
James Fox	N/A	Advanced; Public Vote	N/A	N/A	Safe	Safe	Safe	Safe	Safe	Safe	Students Vote	Safe	Eliminated	Eliminated (Week 9)	
Paris Campbell-Edwards	N/A	N/A	Advanced; Public Vote	N/A	Safe	Judges Vote	Safe	Safe	Judges Vote	Safe	Judges Vote	Eliminated	Eliminated (Week 8)		
Barry McKeever	N/A	N/A	Advanced; Public Vote	N/A	Safe	Awarded bye due to illness	Safe	Safe	Safe	Safe	Eliminated	Eliminated (Week 7)			
Louise Griffiths	Advanced; Public Vote	N/A	N/A	N/A	Judges Vote	Safe	Judges Vote	Judges Vote	Safe	Eliminated	Eliminated (Week 6)				
Simone Stewart	N/A	N/A	Advanced; Students Vote	N/A	Safe	Students Vote	Students Vote	Students Vote	Eliminated	Eliminated (Week 5)					
Gary Phelan	Advanced; Students Vote	N/A	N/A	N/A	Students Vote	Safe	Safe	Eliminated	Eliminated (Week 4)						
Lorna Grant	N/A	N/A	N/A	Advanced; Students Vote	Safe	Safe	Eliminated	Eliminated (Week 3)							
Nick Hall	N/A	N/A	N/A	Advanced; Public Vote	Safe	Eliminated	Eliminated (Week 2)								
Audley Anderson	N/A	Advanced; Students Vote	N/A	N/A	Eliminated	Eliminated (Week 1)									
Terence Surin	N/A	N/A	N/A	Eliminated; Students Vote	Eliminated (Heat 4)										
Janee Bennett	N/A	N/A	N/A	Eliminated; Public Vote	Eliminated (Heat 4)										
Mark Vallance	N/A	N/A	N/A	Eliminated; Public Vote	Eliminated (Heat 4)										
Sally Dawson	N/A	N/A	Eliminated; Students Vote	Eliminated (Heat 3)											
Ryan Fletcher	N/A	N/A	Eliminated; Public Vote	Eliminated (Heat 3)											
Nathan Thomas	N/A	N/A	Eliminated; Public Vote	Eliminated (Heat 3)											
Andrea Magee	N/A	Eliminated; Students Vote	Eliminated (Heat 2)												
Nicole Davis	N/A	Eliminated; Public Vote	Eliminated (Heat 2)												
Renata Wilson	N/A	Eliminated; Public Vote	Eliminated (Heat 2)												
Katie Green	Eliminated; Students Vote	Eliminated (Heat 1)													
LaDonna Harley-Peters	Eliminated; Public Vote	Eliminated (Heat 1)													
Daniel O'Shea	Eliminated; Public Vote	Eliminated (Heat 1)													

== Problems ==
There were personal tensions between several contestants during the series, and producers exacerbated these tensions by showing footage of this whenever possible during the brief highlights packages on the live shows. Arguments also regularly broke out between the Fame Academy teachers during the live showdowns. David and Carrie Grant frequently disagreed with Richard Park, although Robin Gibb maintained a neutral stance, and gained respect for his evenhandedness towards all the contestants throughout the series. Regular arguments also broke out between Richard Park and the presenter Patrick Kielty. Opinions are still divided among viewers about whether these arguments were genuine or deliberately staged for ratings.

The scheduling of the live Fame Academy shows often clashed with the similar Pop Idol on ITV. The latter usually came off better in the ratings, and viewers of both series expressed resentment at this deliberate conflict.

Widespread criticism of the BBC's perceived copying of the Pop Idol format purely to achieve higher viewing figures also featured in the Parliamentary review of the BBC's charter. Many critics felt that it was a prime example of a derivative reality entertainment show which the BBC should not be funding. The programme was not recommissioned for a third series.

The negative publicity this received caused the BBC to distance itself from the whole Fame Academy concept, and plans for a Fame Academy 2 national tour in 2004 never materialised.

== The aftermath ==
Alex Parks and Alistair Griffin were both immediately signed to major record labels and each went on to have top 5 singles with self-penned songs. They have both subsequently released successful albums and singles.

- Alex's debut album, Introduction, reached number 5 in the UK chart, while her second album, Honesty, charted at number 24. Alex has co-written and worked with songwriters and producers such as Boo Hewerdine, John Reynolds, Greg Wells, Peter-John Vettese, Judie Tzuke and Marcella Detroit. Alex has also toured the UK with a band of top session musicians, selling out venues in Edinburgh, Manchester, Birmingham and Cornwall, as well as multiple venues in London, and attracting critical acclaim for her live performances.
- Alistair's debut album, Bring It On, charted at number 12 in the UK. He has since performed live across the UK and Europe, having toured Germany with Robin Gibb. He has also continued his successful songwriting career, co-writing with a number of other artists including Robin Gibb. He is currently working on his second album.

Both artists have now split from their former record companies and are currently pursuing careers as independent singer-songwriters.

- A professional songwriter since 2001, Carolynne Good spent 2004 writing new material, and the following year she toured the UK with Tony Christie. In 2005, under the wing of Christie's Amarillo Music, she formed the Carolynne Good Band. There were plans for an album to be released in 2006, but nothing has so far appeared. As of 2011, Carolynne auditioned for ITV's The X Factor and made it to the judges houses. This was under her new name of Carolynne Poole. Louis Walsh did not select her to continue to the live shows. She returned in 2012, this time with Gary Barlow as her mentor and progressed, this time, to the live shows, where she was eliminated in the first week.
- James Fox was chosen to represent the UK in the Eurovision Song Contest 2004, and had a top 20 single with the British entry, "Hold Onto Our Love". He has since been successful in musical theatre, having appeared in both Jesus Christ Superstar in the UK and the Billy Joel musical, Movin' Out. After appearing on Broadway, he toured the United States and Canada with Movin' Out throughout 2005 and 2006, and starred in the lead role of "Pianoman" in the West End production in spring 2006. He returned to the UK at the end of the 2006 Movin Out Tour and since then has been performing live and working on a solo album.
- Peter Brame co-founded a rock band called One Finger Zen in 2004 and toured the UK with them. He split with the band in late 2005. He is now signed to Manic Records and relaunched his solo career with the release of a single, "Wake Up!", in August 2006. He released his debut album, My Secret Suicide, in October 2008, and it can be purchased from the iTunes Store, as well as being able to listen to on Last.Fm.
- After appearing solo with Jazzy Jeff at London's Jazz Cafe, and working alone in his home recording studio for over a year, Paris Campbell-Edwards formed a rock band called Smokin' Circus, which has recorded several demo tracks and supported Pink in Cardiff CIA in August 2007.
- Audley Anderson has continued to perform and entertain and is currently developing his debut Album called "A Journey into Soul" which is also the name of his live performance show. He has also added a new string to his bow of that as an Artist In Residence working with the ARK schools corporation. March 2009 saw Audley go it alone and release his 1st single Undress U through his own Audiosnooze digital label.

== Albums ==
Two full-length albums featuring a selection of covers from the show were released during and after the series, Fame Academy Bee Gees Special (Polydor) August 2003 and Fame Academy – The Finalists (Polydor) October 2003:

=== Fame Academy Bee Gees Special ===
Track listing:

1. "You Should Be Dancing " – Paris Campbell-Edwards
2. "Guilty" – Carolynne Good
3. "To Love Somebody" – Alistair Griffin
4. "Words" – Alex Parks
5. "Massachusetts" – Peter Brame
6. "Too Much Heaven" – Louise Griffiths
7. "How Deep Is Your Love" – Barry McKeever
8. "More Than a Woman" – James Fox
9. "Heartbreaker" – Simone Stewart
10. "I've Gotta Get a Message to You" – Gary Phelan
11. "You Win Again" – Audley Anderson
12. "Islands in the Stream" – Lorna Grant
13. "Tragedy" – Nick Hall

=== Fame Academy – The Finalists ===
Track listing:

1. "Yellow" – Alex Parks
2. "Words" – Alex Parks
3. "I Don't Want to Talk About It" – Alex Parks
4. "Tainted Love" – Alex Parks
5. "Wherever You Will Go" – Alistair Griffin
6. "Lately" – Alistair Griffin
7. "Truly Madly Deeply" – Alistair Griffin
8. "It Must Be Love" – Alistair Griffin
9. "Underneath Your Clothes" – Carolynne Good
10. "True Colors" – Carolynne Good
11. "It Must Have Been Love" – Carolynne Good
12. "Think Twice" – Carolynne Good
13. "In My Place" – Peter Brame
14. "Somewhere in My Heart" – James Fox
15. "Misty Blue" – Paris Campbell-Edwards

=== Fame Academy – Class Of 2003 (DVD) ===
In November 2003, a DVD, Fame Academy – Class Of 2003, was also released on the Universal label, featuring footage from the programme, live concerts, and previously unreleased material.
