= Helen Boulding =

- Born: 1 December 1973 (age 52)
- Origin: Sheffield, England
- Genres: Pop, Rock
- Instruments: vocals, piano
- Label: Maid in Sheffield
- Website: HelenBoulding.com

Helen Boulding (born 1 December 1973) is an English singer-songwriter. She is originally from Sheffield, South Yorkshire, and is now based in London. Her first album, New Red Dress, was released in February 2008.

== Biography ==
Boulding grew up in Sheffield as part of a large family of Irish descent and was introduced to music by her parents. Her uncle ran a local Irish pub, Fagans, which ran regular music sessions.

Boulding chose music over sport, coming from a high achieving sports family. Her brother Michael was an ATP-ranking tennis player before switching to football, playing in the Premier League for Aston Villa in 2002. Michael and brother Rory also played in the same team at Mansfield Town and Bradford City. Her sister Sally was a world-ranked tennis player and her other sister, Laura, played rounders for England, her youngest sister Mary worked as an assistant director on films.

She co-wrote the 911 song "The Day We Find Love" which was a top 5 hit in the UK Singles Chart in 1997.

In 2002 she provided backing vocals on two tracks, "Help Me Help You" and "Naughty Girl", on Holly Valance's album Footprints.

Bolding has written songs with Simon Tong (The Good, the Bad & the Queen, The Verve), Squeeze's Chris Difford and Pink Floyd's Rick Wright. She has also collaborated with songwriter Billy Steinberg. Bolding co-wrote "Maybe That's What It Takes", the debut single of Alex Parks, a top five hit in the UK in 2003.

In 2007, she toured Europe with Bryan Ferry. She guests on the title track from The Orb's album The Dream, which she also co-wrote. She also performed on BBC One's evening primetime magazine show The One Show as a last-minute replacement for Rolan Bolan, who was due to perform on the show on the anniversary of his father's death. Bolan was held up in the United States, and at the suggestion of presenter Adrian Chiles, who had heard some of Boulding's songs, she was invited to step in, performing Marc Bolan's "Life's A Gas" in front of Bolan's ex Gloria Jones.

Her debut album New Red Dress was released on her own Maid in Sheffield label on 11 February 2008. She co-wrote all songs on the album with, amongst others, Phil Thornalley (of The Cure) and Martin Glover. The album was also produced by Glover (Youth). The album cover photo was taken by Bryan Adams. It was BBC Radio 2's Album of the Week prior to its release.

Two singles were taken from the album, "Breathe" and "Copenhagen".

== Discography ==
=== Albums ===
- New Red Dress – Helen Boulding – (Maid in Sheffield) – 11 February 2008
- Calling All Angels – Helen Boulding – (Maid in Sheffield) – 16 July 2012

=== Singles ===
- "Housework EP" (Main Spring/Mercury) – 11 April 2005
- "I Don't Know What I Want But I Know What I Need" (Main Spring/Mercury) – 13 February 2006
- "What A Fool" (Maid in Sheffield) – 31 July 2006
- "Breathe" – (Maid in Sheffield) – 9 November 2007
- "Copenhagen" – (Maid in Sheffield) – 4 February 2008
- "It's You" – (Maid in Sheffield) – 13 October 2008 – the official track for the PDSA TV Campaign
- "The Innocents" – (Maid in Sheffield) – 8 July 2012
- "Jerusalem" – (Maid in Sheffield) – 4 November 2012
- "Crooked Tooth" – (Maid in Sheffield) – 28 October 2013

== Songwriting credits ==
- "You Can Be A Hero" on album A Dream Come True – Becky Taylor – (EMI Classics) – 2001 – reached number 67 in the UK Albums Chart and number 61 in the Japanese Chart
- "I'm Your Angel" on the album Everything Eventually – Appleton – (Universal) – 2003
- "Maybe That's What It Takes" on album Introduction – Alex Parks – (Polydor Records) – 24 November 2003 – reached number 5 in the UK Chart
- "Out of Touch" on album Honesty – Alex Parks – (Polydor Records) – 24 October 2005 – reached number 24 in the UK Chart
- "The Dream" on album The Dream – The Orb – (Liquid Sound Design, Traffic Inc, Six Degrees) – 2007
- "Everything" on album Sehnsucht – DJ Schiller – (Universal) – 2008 – reached number 16 in the German Chart and went platinum
- "Your Voice" on album Here's What I Believe – Joe Mcelderry – (Decca) – 2012 – reached number 8 in the UK Chart, number 9 in the Scottish Chart & number 88 in the Irish Album Chart
- "Mayday" on album Here's What I Believe – Joe Mcelderry – (Decca) – 2012
- "Silence Is The Loudest Cry" on album Here's What I Believe – Joe Mcelderry – (Decca) – 2012
- "Boomerang" on the album, Cartwheels – Ward Thomas – (Sony) – Released on 9 September 2016, it reached number 1 in the UK Chart
- "The Day We Find Love" – 911 (EMI, Virgin) – 15 February 1997 – reached number 4 in UK Chart
- "You Can Be A Hero" (EMI Classics) – 2001
- "Maybe That's What It Takes" – Alex Parks – (Polydor Records) – 17 November 2003 – reached number 3 in UK Chart
- "Are You The Way Home?" – Mary-Jess Leaverland – (Decca Records) – 2011
