= Honesty (Alex Parks song) =

2006 single by Alex Parks

Single by Alex Parks

from the album Honesty
- Released: 23 January 2006
- Length: 3:39
- Label: Polydor
- Songwriter(s): Alex Parks, Judie Tzuke, Graham Kearns

Alex Parks singles chronology
"Looking for Water" (2005)	"Honesty" (2006)

"Honesty" is the second and final single from English singer-songwriter Alex Parks' second album, and is the title track. It was released as a single on 23 January 2006. Despite hopes that it would revive interest in the album, it received little promotion or distribution and peaked at number 56 on the UK Singles Chart.

== Music video ==
In the music video, Parks' car seems to have broken down, so she hitches a ride in a hippy van, and then walks to a house by the beach to perform the last chorus of the song.

== Track listing ==
1. "Honesty"
2. "Black & White"
3. "Just Love"
