= Carolynne Willey =

English singer-songwriter, actress and former model

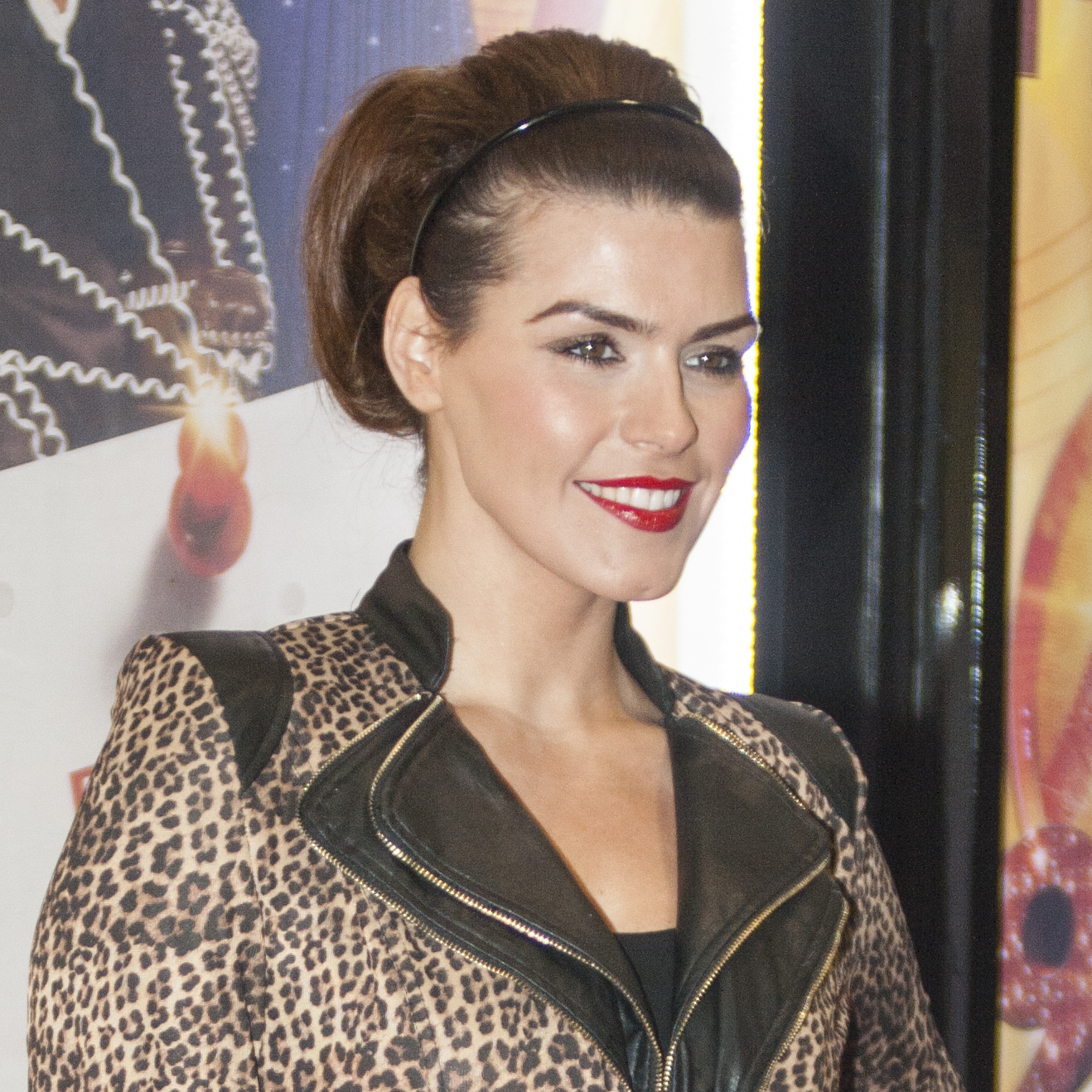
- Willey outside the Manchester Opera House for a performance of the 9 to 5 musical in October 2012.

Background information
- Born: Carolynne Good; 5 August 1980 (age 46); Leeds, West Yorkshire, England
- Genres: Pop, country
- Occupations: Singer, actress, former model
- Instrument: Vocals
- Years active: 1998–present
- Label: RCA

Carolynne Willey (née Good; born 5 August 1980) is a British singer-songwriter and actress from Leeds, England. She first gained recognition as a finalist on the second series of the BBC talent show Fame Academy in 2003, where she finished third. In 2011, she competed on The X Factor and advanced to the judges' houses stage. She returned the following year and reached the live shows, but was eliminated after the first week.

== Early and personal life ==
Carolynne Good was born in Leeds, Yorkshire. She attended Intake High School (now Leeds West Academy).

She was previously married to footballer David Poole. In August 2015, Good announced that she was in a relationship with England cricketer David Willey, whom she married in November 2016. The couple have two children together.

She is a fan of rugby league team Leeds Rhinos.

== Singing career ==
=== 1998–2001: Early career ===
Poole's early musical influences included The Eagles, U2, The Carpenters, and Mary Chapin Carpenter. In 1998, having moved from Leeds to London to pursue a career as a singer-songwriter, she was one of the final 15 in auditions for S Club 7, along with Pop Idol contestant Zoe Birkett. The following year, Poole joined and fronted a five-member country music band, with which she toured the UK. In 2001, she signed her first publishing contract with BMG Music Publishing. In 2000, she continued to develop her songwriting talents in the UK and Europe. She split most of her time between London and Stockholm, writing for other recording artists, writing and recording with different songwriters and producers.

=== 2003–05: Fame Academy, songwriting and touring ===
In 2003, Poole appeared in the second series of the BBC's singing competition Fame Academy, in which she reached the final. A song she co-wrote with fellow contestants Alex Parks and James Fox, titled "Not Your Average Kind of Girl", was included on Parks' 2003 debut album Introduction. The album reached number 5 on the UK Albums Chart and has since been classified 2x Platinum in the UK, and gold in six other countries including Italy, Greece, Germany, and Australia.

Poole spent 2004 continuing to writing songs, and in the next year toured the UK with Tony Christie.

=== 2011–12: The X Factor ===
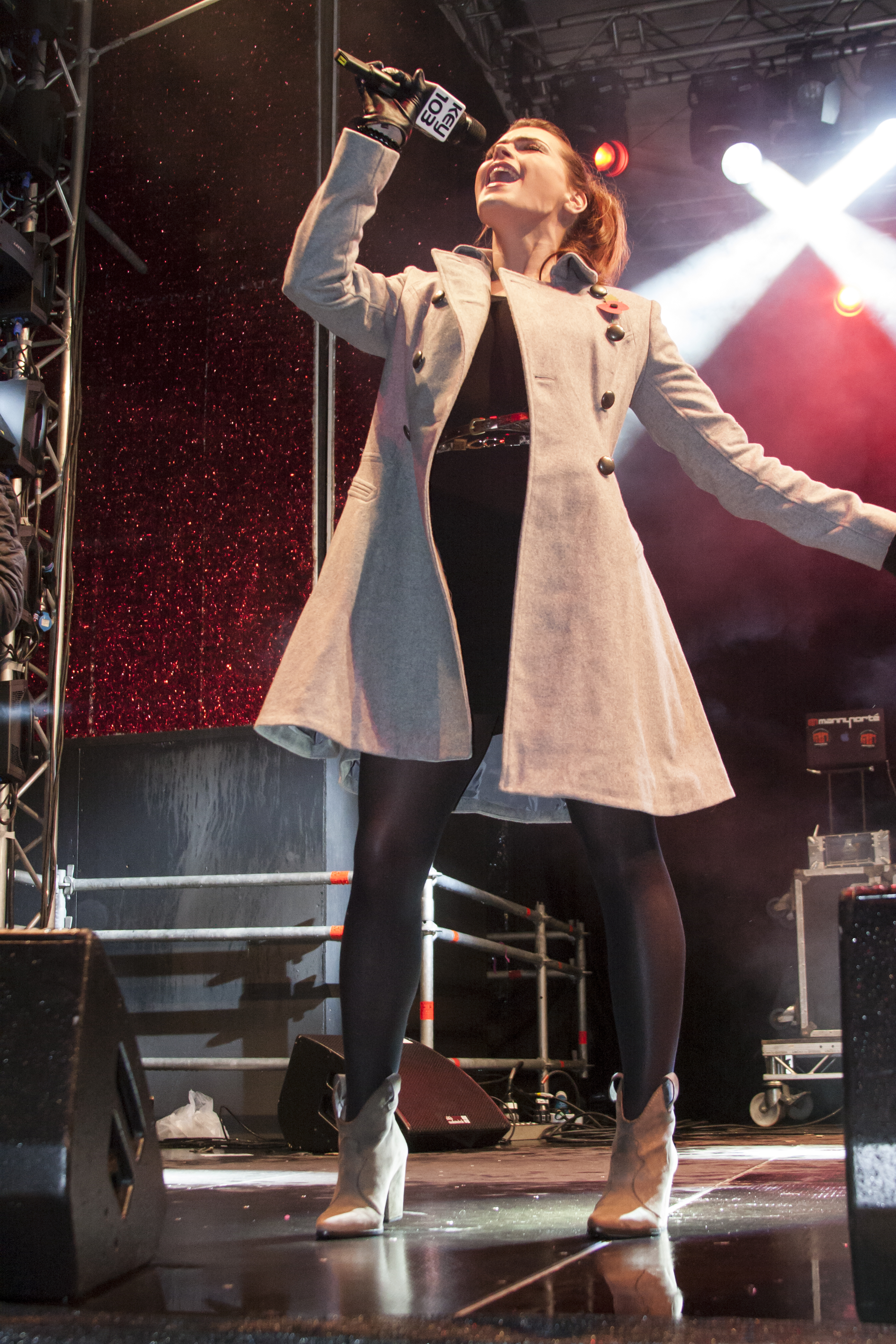
Poole performing at the 2012 Manchester Christmas lights switch-on celebration.

In 2011, Poole auditioned for the eighth series of The X Factor. She reached the "judges' houses" stage, where Louis Walsh was her mentor in the "over 25s" category, but failed to progress through to the live shows, with Walsh instead choosing Johnny Robinson, Kitty Brucknell, Jonjo Kerr and Goldie Cheung (who later dropped out and was replaced by Sami Brookes).

Poole auditioned again for the ninth series, and made it to the live shows with Gary Barlow as her mentor. In the first week of the live shows, Poole sang Nicki Minaj's "Starships". Despite positive comments, however, she was in the bottom two the following night with controversial "boys" contestant Rylan Clark. Nicole Scherzinger voted against Poole as Clark was in her category, while Gary Barlow and Tulisa voted to eliminate Clark based on the final showdown performance. This meant Walsh had the casting vote, but he appeared unable to make up his mind. After hesitating for some time, he eventually said "I'm going to go with Carolynne, I want to keep Carolynne.", although he had to say who wanted to send home, not who he wanted to save. Eventually, after being pressured for an answer by presenter Dermot O'Leary, Walsh made his decision by saying, "I want to take it to deadlock!". O'Leary then revealed that Poole had received the fewest public votes, and she was sent home, much to the disgust of Barlow, who stormed off-stage and later called Clark a "joke act" and "talentless".

=== 2014–present: Debut album ===
Following The X Factor, Poole relocated to the United States for five months. She spent time gigging in Arizona and Los Angeles as well as in Nashville, Tennessee, commonly known as the "home of country", where she collaborated with songwriters and producers including Jeff Silbar. In 2014 and 2015, she played at the C2C: Country to Country festival in London. In early 2015, Poole received radio airplay on BBC Radio 2 Country with a song titled "Cupid Must've Been High". Later Poole released her debut single, "I Love You but Shut Up", which features guitar-playing by Albert Lee. The single was play listed on BBC Radio 2, which led to a Terry Wogan session. She returned to play two slots at C2C in March 2016.

Carolynne released her debut 5 song albums "Coming Back To Me" on 7 April 2017, and was subsequently nominated for two British Country Music Association Awards.

== Acting career ==
Since 2005, Poole has appeared on stage in pantomime and has also acted in short films. In August 2008, she began shooting her first feature film, playing Frankie in The Last Days of Edgar Harding, which was released in 2011. In 2010, she played the role of Sue in Bill Kenwright's UK tour of Dreamboats and Petticoats, and had a minor role in the BBC film Eric and Ernie. In May 2012, Poole appeared in Emmerdale as the main character's girlfriend. She later played Justin Gallagher's new fiancée, Talia Brice.
