= Honesty (Alex Parks album) =

Studio album by Alex Parks
- Released: 24 October 2005
- Recorded: The Aquarium, London; Rocket Carousel Studio, Los Angeles; Area 21
- Genre: Folk-pop; alternative; indie rock
- Length: 60:47
- Label: Polydor
- Producer: John Reynolds; Alan Branch; Greg Wells; Graham Kearns; Stephen Lipson; Peter-John Vettese

Alex Parks chronology
Introduction (2003)	Honesty (2005)

Honesty is Alex Parks' second album, co-written with producers Greg Wells, Alan Branch, John Reynolds and Peter-John Vettese, as well as songwriters Judie Tzuke, Karen Poole and Marcella Detroit. It was released on 24 October 2005.

The lead single "Looking for Water" was released prior to the album as an exclusive internet-download download, and failed to make the charts on downloads alone.

The album received mixed reviews and charted at number 24. There were hopes that a second single, the title track "Honesty", released on 23 January 2006, would revive interest in the album. However, the single received minimal promotion and radio airplay, despite strong video airplay on The Hits and B4, as well as limited distribution, and entered the chart at number 56.

Honesty represents a distinct shift in genre from Parks' first album Introduction, which was clearly in the commercial pop genre. Honesty is predominantly alternative folk pop with some rock and chill out influences, and includes a hidden track, "Tail and All", with a French samba rhythm.

Three very distinctive rock B-sides — "Near Death Experience", "Just Love" and "Black & White" — were released with the two singles from this album.

== Track listing ==
1. "Lie" - 4:21 (Alex Parks, Alan Branch, John Reynolds)
2. "Out of Touch" - 4:04 (Parks, Helen Boulding)
3. "Looking for Water" - 4:05 (Parks, Judie Tzuke, Graham Kearns)
4. "So Emotional" - 3:59 (Parks, Tzuke, Kearns)
5. "Lost Without a Name" - 4:13 (Parks, Marcella Detroit)
6. "Get Out" - 3:49 (Parks, Tzuke, Kearns)
7. "Honesty" - 3:39 (Parks, Tzuke, Kearns)
8. "Adore" - 4:45 (Parks, Greg Wells)
9. "From the Inside" - 4:26 (Parks, Karen Poole, Stephen Lipson)
10. "Sweeter & Sweeter" - 3:59 (Parks, Wells)
11. "Truth or Dare" - 6:24 (Parks, Peter-John Vettese, Felix Howard)
12. "Moment" - 3:11 (Parks, Wells)
- "Tail and All" - ~ - 3:36 (hidden track, starts 9 minutes and 26 seconds into Moment)
