= Alex Parks =

English singer-songwriter (born 1984)

- Born: Alexandra Rebecca Parks; 26 July 1984 (age 41)
- Origin: Mount Hawke, Cornwall, England
- Genres: Folk-pop, alternative, indie rock
- Years active: 2003–2006
- Labels: Polydor (2003–2006)

Alexandra Rebecca Parks (born 26 July 1984) is a retired English singer-songwriter. In 2003 Parks won the second series of the BBC Television programme Fame Academy immediately followed by the release of her first album entitled Introduction, which went double platinum in the United Kingdom and gold in several other European countries. In 2005 she released her second album, Honesty, but was subsequently dropped by her record label in February 2006.

Parks has been inactive in music since 2006.

== Biography ==
Alex Parks was born in July 1984 and was raised in the village of Mount Hawke, Cornwall. She is the youngest of four siblings. Parks attended college at The Hub in St Austell.

Parks began fronting a local band, One Trick Pony, which performed mostly cover songs by artists such as Joni Mitchell, Ani Di Franco and Michelle Branch. For two years they played in bars around Cornwall, but the momentum of the band gradually ran down, leaving Parks in her bedroom with a four-track tape machine and a bunch of her songs-in-progress.

Parks initially planned to move to Amsterdam to learn the art of clowning, but her career path changed when her father submitted an application for the second season of the BBC Television series, Fame Academy.

Parks is gay and before entering Fame Academy had a long-term girlfriend from Newquay.

== Fame Academy ==
Having been prompted by her father to take part in auditions for the show, which threw her in amongst 12,000 hopefuls, the 18-year-old Alex found herself the youngest student chosen for the two-month stay at Witanhurst House in north London.

The final showdown between Parks and Alistair Griffin was screened live and generated so many angry messages from viewers after Daniel Bedingfield who duetted with both finalists, made his feelings clear by urging viewers that they should "just vote for Alex". This outburst by Bedingfield led to claims of favouritism. The BBC was forced to close down the Points of View message boards as negative messages flooded the board. Bedingfield made a public apology to Griffin for his behaviour and outburst. The actual voting figures have never been publicly released. Parks went on to win the show.

=== Recording career ===
Her song "Maybe That's What It Takes" was released on 17 November 2003 and peaked at number 3 in the UK Singles Chart the following week. Her debut album Introduction was subsequently released and sold over 500,000 copies. She expressed an interest in a recording career.

Honesty was eventually released in October 2005, preceded by the lead single, "Looking For Water", in October 2005. The album peaked at No. 24 in the UK Albums Chart.

After being dropped by her label, Polydor, Parks wrote a statement to her fans on her official website stating that she had almost no support from the media and that she was disappointed in how things had turned out. She was not sure whether she was not promoted well enough because they did not like her music, her personally or the fact she had become famous via a reality TV programme.

== Discography ==
=== Studio albums ===
Year	Album	Chart positions		Sales and certification
Year	Album	UK	Ireland	Sales and certification
2003	Introduction: Released: 24 November 2003; Label: Polydor; Formats: CD	5	54	BPI sales: 600,000+ BPI certification: 2× Platinum; Also went Gold in Italy, Germany, Greece and Australia among others.
2005	Honesty: Released: 24 October 2005; Label: Polydor; Formats: CD	24	—	BPI sales: 50,000+
" — " denotes albums that were released but did not chart.

=== Singles ===
Year	Title	Album	Chart positions	
Year	Title	Album	UK	Ireland
2003	"Maybe That's What It Takes"	Introduction	3	26
2004	"Cry"	Introduction	13	32
2005	"Looking for Water"^{1}	Honesty	—	—
2006	"Honesty"	Honesty	56	—

^{1} On downloads only

== See also ==
- List of singer-songwriters
- List of people from Cornwall
- List of gay, lesbian or bisexual people: P-Q
- List of Polydor Records artists
- List of performers on Top of the Pops
