= Ohio Web Library =

The Ohio Web Library is a large collection of over 280 electronic information resources, or online databases, provided by Libraries Connect Ohio (LCO), which is composed of four major Ohio library networks — OPLIN, OhioLINK, INFOhio, and the State Library of Ohio. Within these licensed databases are almost 31,000 individual electronic serial titles (i.e., publications with ISSN), and the databases are accessed through a federated search tool or meta search engine with a simple interface.

LCO can cooperatively purchase access to these statewide resources at a cost-effective rate whereas most individual libraries would not be able to afford them on their own. These subscription-based research databases are available for free to all Ohio residents regardless of their location, age, education, or economic status and include online publications and research resources, such as scholarly journals, popular magazines, trade publications, newspapers (Ohio and nationwide), encyclopedias, dictionaries, and educational/training tutorials.

== Funding and Governance ==
The Ohio Web Library is funded by a federal IMLS Library Services and Technology Act (LSTA) grant through the State Library of Ohio, which provides about $1.5 million per year. The three LCO library networks — OPLIN, OhioLINK, and INFOhio — provide an additional $3 million in state funds each year from their budgets. The federal LSTA grant that helps fund the Ohio Web Library is a temporary funding measure that expires every June 30. No permanent funding is in place to sustain these resources or to expand them.

The Ohio Web Library resources are purchased by Ohio libraries and library organizations for exclusive use by Ohio residents. This system uses IP address recognition to verify whether someone is located in Ohio, but these resources can also be accessed by providing an Ohio public library card number for user authentication.

== Collaborative Library Organizations ==
The Ohio Web Library is a collaborative effort of Ohio libraries and the following library organizations:

- INFOhio
- Ohio Library and Information Network (OhioLINK)
- Ohio Public Library Information Network (OPLIN)
- State Library of Ohio (SLO)

== Ohio Public Library Information Network (OPLIN) ==
The Ohio Public Library Information Network (OPLIN) provides broadband Internet connections and related information services to Ohio public libraries. Its primary mission is to ensure that all Ohio residents have free public Internet access through the 251 independent local public library systems in Ohio, as well as the use of research databases not freely available on the World Wide Web.

As a state government agency, OPLIN receives extensive fiscal support services from the State Library of Ohio and contracts with the Ohio Office of Information Technology for assistance with network management. Most of the budget is used to purchase the services provided to Ohio public libraries, primarily Internet access and information databases. Because OPLIN provides these services, public libraries do not need to pay for them from their individual budgets.

== Statewide Research Databases ==
=== Genealogy ===
- Explore Ohio | OPLIN
- Ohio Death Certificate Index (1913–1944)
- Sanborn Fire Insurance Maps

=== Magazines & Newspapers ===
- All EBSCOhost Databases
- MasterFILE Premier | EBSCOhost
- NewsBank (Ohio's Newspapers)
- Newspaper Source | EBSCOhost

=== Reference & Research ===
- Academic Search Premier
- Explore Ohio | OPLIN
- Ohio History Central || Online Encyclopedia
- Oxford Reference Online
- Student Research Center
- World Book Hispanica
- World Book Spanish
- World Book Online

=== Students & Homework ===
- Kids Search | EBSCOhost
- Searchasaurus | EBSCOhost
- Student Research Center | EBSCOhost
- World Book Kids

=== Books, Arts, & Literature ===
- About:Books
- American and English full text literature collections
- ART Collection
- Oxford Reference Online

=== Business & Government ===
- Business Source Premier | EBSCOhost
- Explore Ohio | OPLIN
- Ohio.gov: Government Information & Services
- Regional Business News | EBSCOhost

=== History & Biography ===
- Biography Reference Bank
- Explore Ohio | OPLIN
- Ohio Death Certificate Index (1913–1944)
- Ohio History Central || Online Encyclopedia
- Ohio Memory Online Scrapbook
- Sanborn Fire Insurance Maps

=== Science ===
- Ohioline
- Science Online

=== Employment Resources & Practice Exams ===
- LearningExpress Library
- Job & Career Accelerator
