= Richwood-North Union Public Library =

Library system in Richwood, Ohio, US

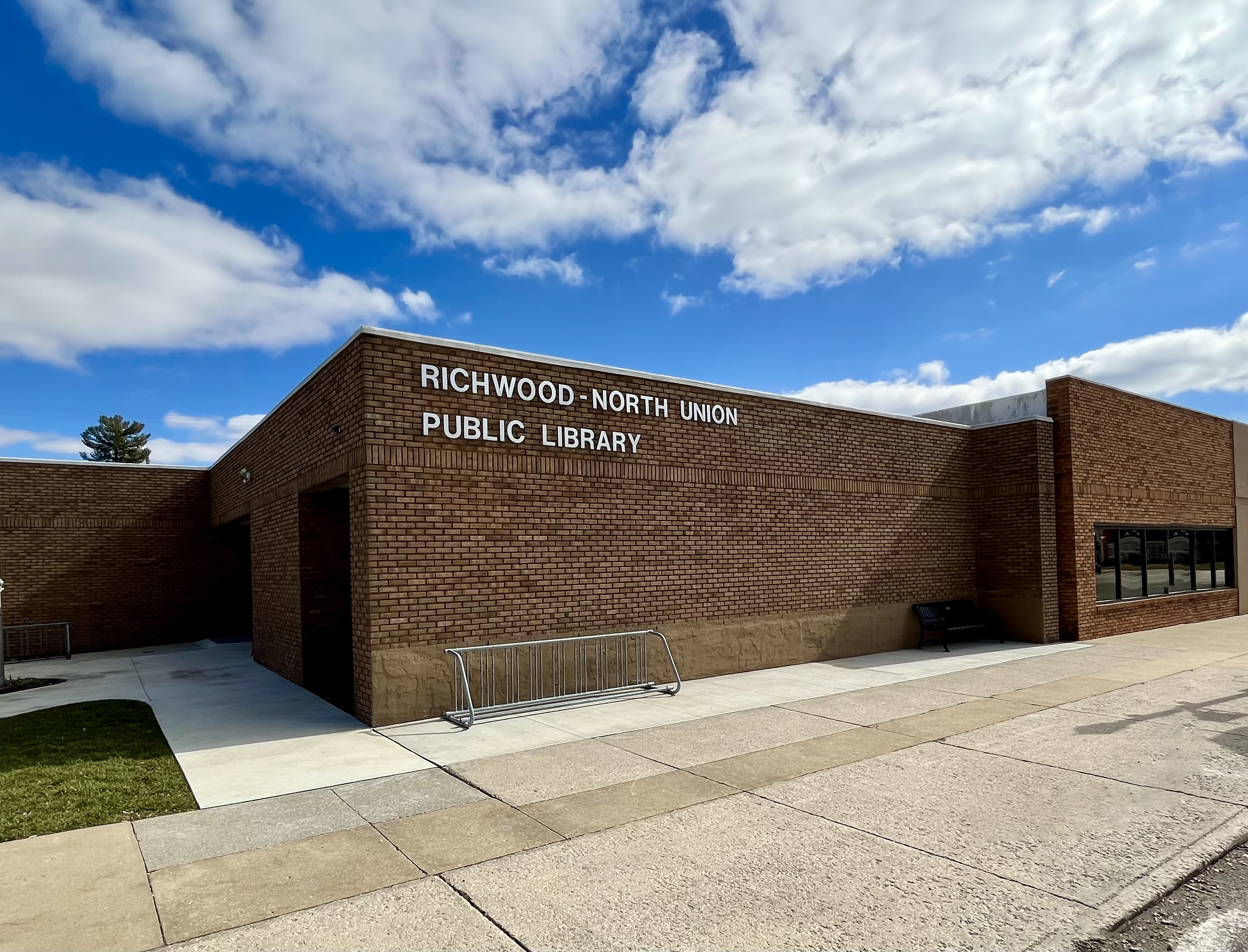
- Richwood-North Union Public Library
- 40.4263°N 83.2961°W
- Location: 4 East Ottawa Street; Richwood, Ohio, United States
- Type: Public library
- Established: April 1915; 110 years ago

Collection
- Size: 65,000

Access and use
- Circulation: 34,501
- Population served: 8,140

Other information
- Budget: $600,000
- Director: Audrey Deel
- Employees: 8
- Website: www.richwoodlibrary.org

The Richwood-North Union Public Library (RNUPL) is a public library located in Richwood, Ohio, United States. It was founded in 1915 and is a member of the Serving Every Ohioan Consortium.

== Richwood Library Association ==
The Richwood Library Association was an early book association created in 1882. A meeting was held at the Richwood Methodist Episcopal Church to discuss its formation. The officers of the association included: A. J. Blake, president; Lizzie King, vice president; P. R. Mills, secretary; G. B. Hamilton, treasurer; and Robert Smith, librarian. Citizens of Richwood could subscribe to the association for $3; of which amount $2.50 was expended for the purchase of new books and bookcases. The additional fifty cents allowed for their share of the incidental expenses.

On motion, a committee of five was appointed to assist in selecting books for the association. The committee included: P. R. Mills, A. Watson, J. P. Brookins, J. D. Slemmons, and Robert Smith. The association was considered a precursor to the Richwood-North Union Public Library.

== History ==
In 1914, citizens of Richwood met to discuss establishing a free public library to serve the community. A committee was appointed, including Rev. J. R. Lloyd as chairman, Archer Olive as president, Dwight L. Custis as vice president, Mrs. D. C. Cushman as secretary, and Mrs. Charles Snowden as treasurer. The committee was tasked with soliciting members at one dollar each to raise the funds to open a public library and, eventually, build a library building.

The Library Board of Trustees was organized on January 26, 1915. Lloyd was elected board president, with Cushman as secretary and Snowden as treasurer. The board appointed a committee to find a location for the library. Before the end of February, space on the second story of the Hastings Building on Franklin Street were secured, with one room for the library and another for a reading room. The Hastings Building was a three-story structure with the Franz Millinery shop on the first floor.

The Richwood Public Library formally opened on April 8, 1915, and featured mission style furniture. However, its books were not yet ready to circulate and it temporarily closed three weeks later so staff and the state librarian could catalog its books. It was reported that the library had magazines and 635 books. The first librarian was Donna Mae Harriman. After one year, the library's collections included 1,230 books and 47 files of magazines. In addition, the Ohio State Library had supplied a traveling collection of 150 books.

In February 1917, the library moved to the Mrs. William Peet Building on South Franklin Street. In 1920, it then moved to the Kittie Vaughan property located on east Blagrove Street, behind the Richwood Banking Company. The Library Board of Trustees purchased the building for $1,080. Elizabeth Copp donated $500 toward the purchase of the property.

Due to the impact of the Great Depression, the First National Bank of Richwood permanently closed in 1935. The library board offered $2,500 to purchase the building and the offer was accepted on March 24, 1936. The purchase was completed in mid-April. After remodeling and decorating, the library opened in the former bank building on December 14, 1936.

That location served the library well until forty years later when a larger location was needed. In 1971, the library purchased the property on East Ottawa Street for $15,000. A new brick building was constructed and opened on May 28, 1974. The new library was five times bigger than the former bank building and cost around $156,000. The library's collection at the time of opening was some 40,000 books.

In September 1976, the library board voted to change the institution's name to Richwood North Union Public Library to better reflect the area it serves.
