= Rossford Public Library =

Library in Rossford, Ohio, United States

Coordinates: 41°36′30″N 83°33′42″W

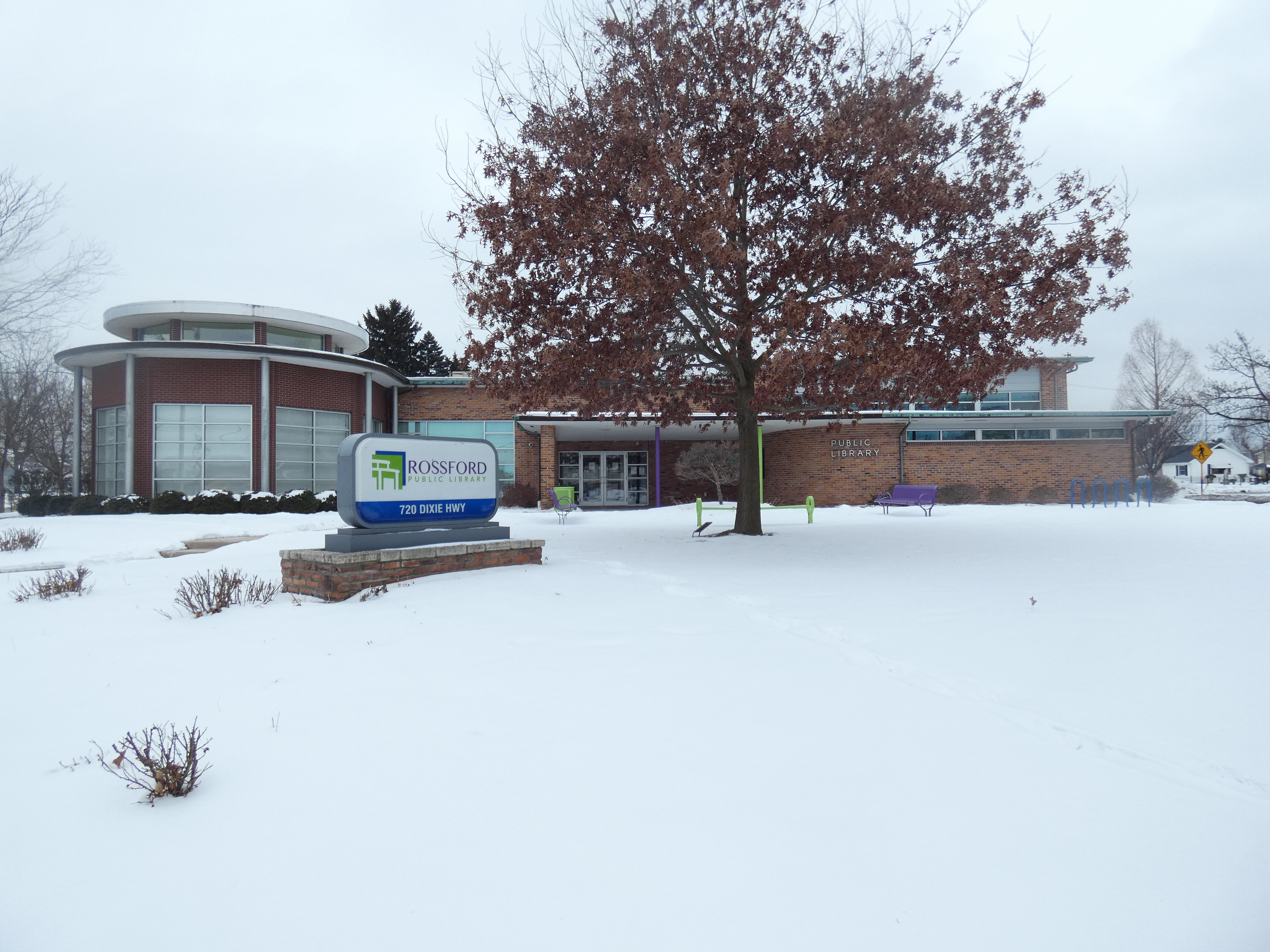
- Library's main entrance
- Location: Rossford, Ohio
- Type: Public
- Established: 1936

Collection
- Size: 62,503

Access and use
- Circulation: 253,986
- Population served: 13,894

Other information
- Website: www.rossfordlibrary.org

Rossford Public Library (RPL) is a library located in Rossford, Ohio. It is a member of Serving Every Ohioan Library Consortium and Oplin (Ohio Public Library Information Network). The library was established in 1936 and housed in a one-room store building. The freestanding library building was constructed in 1950 with funding donated on behalf of the Libbey Owens Ford Glass Company (now part of Pilkington Group). The library's collections include historical photos and documents related to the glass company's business activities in Rossford. In the mid-2000s the library underwent a major renovation and expansion.

The Rossford Library contains a collection of 62,503 volumes, circulates 253,986 items per year, and serves a population of 13,894 residents.

In 2005, Rossford Public Library patrons borrowed over 250,000 items, of which 110,000 came from the Children's Materials section. In that same year, patrons made over 69,000 visits to the library and asked over 14,000 questions of the reference librarians.

== Additional sources ==
- Toledo Blade (Toledo, Ohio). "Rossford Public Library Related Articles".
- Ray, Erika (January 12, 2006). "Rossford: Teenagers to make their marks on library wall". The Blade (Toledo, Ohio).
- "Stand up and holler at libraries' new story hours". The Intelligencer (Doylestown, PA). September 16, 2007.
