= F. Ward Murrey =

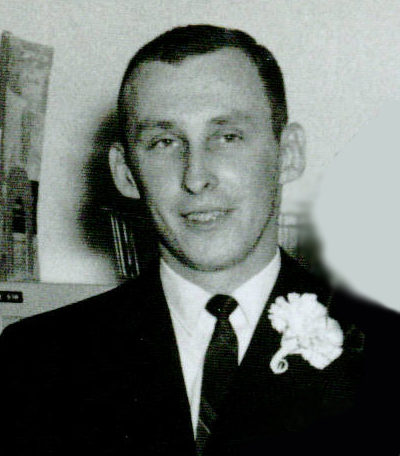
F. Ward Murrey

F. Ward Murrey is the vice-president of the State Library of Ohio Board, and former director of the Southeastern Ohio (SEO) Library Center.

== Career ==
Murrey first became affiliated with the State Library of Ohio in 1961 when he began working for the Southeastern Ohio Library Center (now called Serving Every Ohioan Library Center) in Caldwell, Ohio. Murrey started out as a part-time employee for the center, traveling to various counties exchanging books and media. He later became an assistant to R. Jane Thomas, who served as director of the center from 1964 to 1972. When Thomas left the center, Murrey served as the bookmobile supervisor. In 1979 he was appointed director of the SEO Library Center and served this position until he retired in 1998. Ten years later in 2008, Murrey began serving on the State Library of Ohio Board of Directors. As of January 2011, he serves as the board's vice president. Murrey is a longtime advocate for libraries, especially rural and small libraries. Murrey is a member of the Noble County Chamber of Commerce. He currently serves on several local boards and the sixteen county Eastern Ohio Development Alliance, an independent, non-profit organization created to promote economic growth in eastern Ohio through regional cooperation.

== F. Ward Murrey Annex ==
In 2000, the SOLO Regional Library System constructed a building adjacent to the SEO Library Center. When SOLO disbanded in 2006, the building was given to the SEO Library Center, who annexed it in honor of F. Ward Murrey. The F. Ward Murrey Annex serves as a training facility for libraries across the state of Ohio. The annex features a fully functional computer lab including LCD projection technologies. The F. Ward Murrey Annex is available at no cost to any state agency or Ohio library for learning purposes and training sessions. The annex is located at 40678 Marietta Road, Caldwell, Ohio.

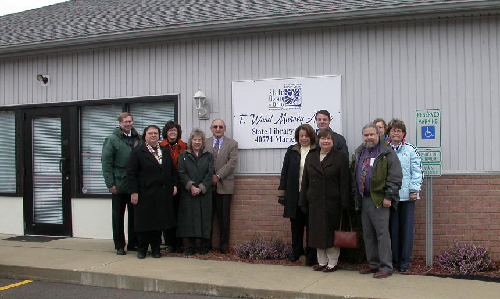
Dedication Ceremony of the Annex
