= Richwood, Ohio =

- Village
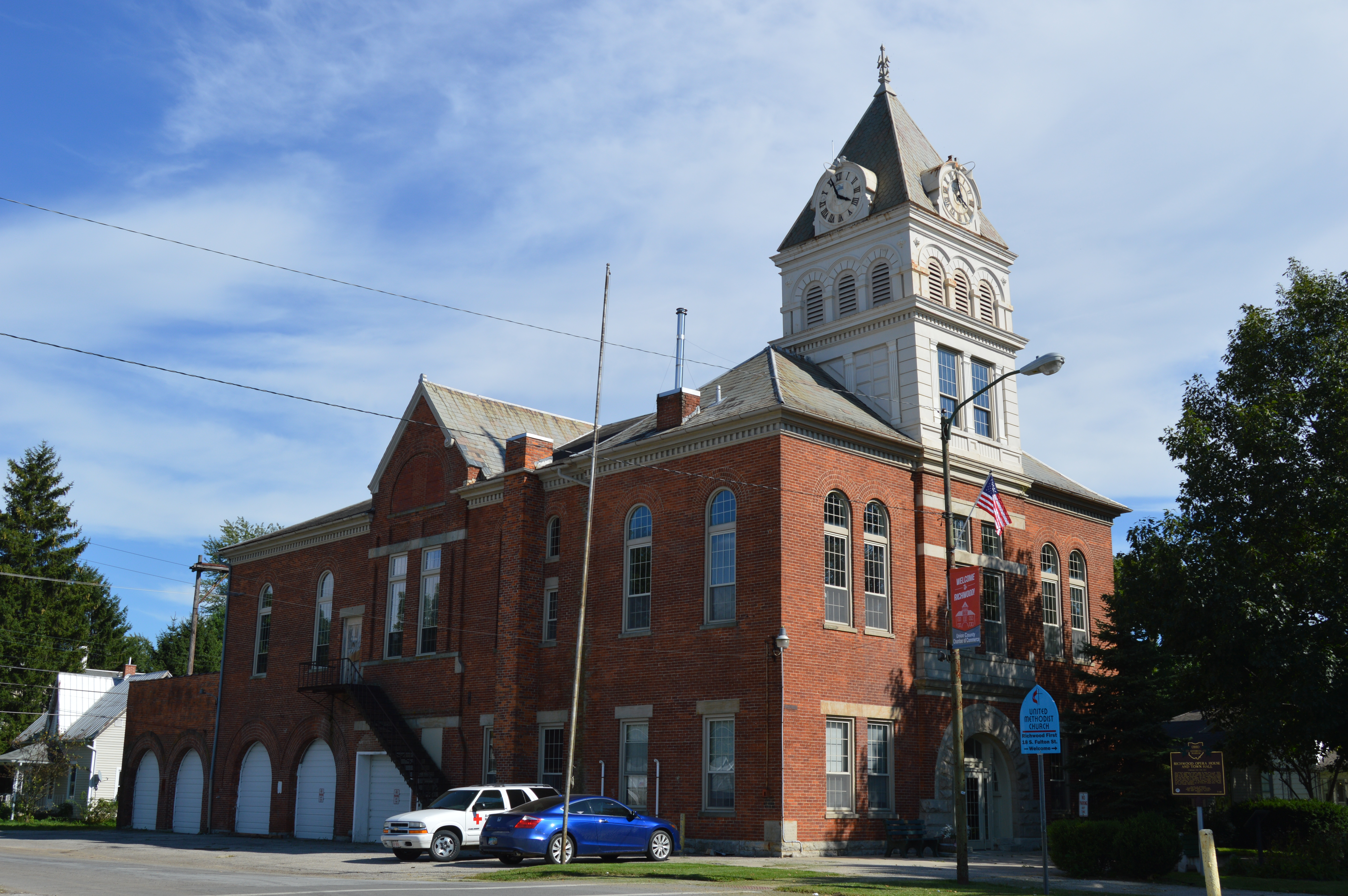
- Richwood Opera House and Town Hall

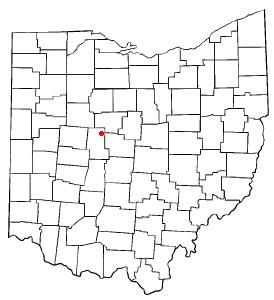
- Location of Richwood, Ohio

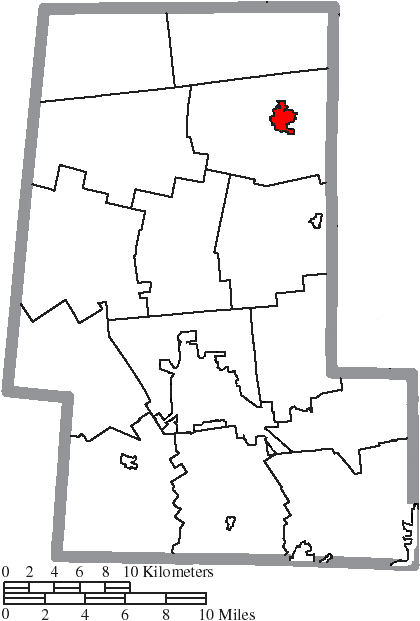
- Location of Richwood in Union County
- Coordinates: 40°25′39″N 83°17′42″W
- Country: United States
- State: Ohio
- County: Union
- Township: Claibourne

Area
  - Total: 1.27 sq mi (3.28 km^{2})
  - Land: 1.24 sq mi (3.22 km^{2})
  - Water: 0.027 sq mi (0.07 km^{2})
- Elevation: 948 ft (289 m)

Population (2020)
  - Total: 2,222
  - Density: 1,789.4/sq mi (690.88/km^{2})
- Time zone: UTC-5 (Eastern (EST))
  - Summer (DST): UTC-4 (EDT)
- ZIP code: 43344
- Area code: 740
- FIPS code: 39-66936
- GNIS feature ID: 2399070
- Website: Village website

Richwood is a village in Union County, Ohio, United States. The population was 2,222 at the 2020 census.

== History ==
=== Early history, 1820–1860 ===
Union County was organized on January 10, 1820, from territory previously contained in Franklin, Madison, Logan and Delaware Counties. Claibourne Township was surveyed by Richard Claiborne in 1811. The first settler in Claiborne Township was Cyprian Lee, who with Henry Swartz took the contract to build the township's first road in 1825. The 15 feet (4.6 m) wide road was cut from the southernmost to the northernmost lines of the township, the effort consisting of clearing underbrush and small trees, leaving 'many obstacles in the shape of large timber.' This north to south road passed through what would become Richwood.

In 1832, two 1,200-acre (490 ha) land grants in Union County were received by William Pelham and Charles Blagrove of Virginia. Pelham sold his land to Blagrove that same year, who promptly gave his nieces, Catherine and Parthenia Blagrove of Washington, D.C., the two parcels. Richwood would later be laid out on Parthenia's parcel. Blagrove put her legal affairs in the hands of Delaware attorney George Bomford, who sold the land to Philip Plummer.

Philip Plummer was originally from Mt. Vernon, but he had been impressed with Union County's tree growth and rich soil. Once he had purchased Blagrove's plat he returned with his brother Thomas, who was a surveyor. Together they found that the level ground and distance from Marysville, the county seat, would make that location desirable for a city. The town of Richwood was laid out August 8,9,10 1832 by Philip, his brother Thomas and Union County Surveyor Levi Phelps, who aided the project, and whose office recorded the first boundary lines for the new town.

When the surveying was finished Richwood was platted and declared open for settlement, the plat covering a total area of 44 acres (18 ha). The north-south and east-west roads were named Franklin (after Benjamin Franklin) and Ottaway (later renamed Ottawa), respectively, both to be 100 feet (30 m) wide. Four other streets were platted: Fulton and Clinton Streets going north-south, Blagrove and Bomford going east-west, each to be 82.5 feet (25.1 m) wide.

The first building in Richwood was a one-room log cabin occupied by John P. Brookins and his family. For many years, he was the only doctor in Richwood and served as Justice of the Peace and as Postmaster.

In 1834 Richwood got its first established business, a grocery store opened by Burdick & Calloway. That same year, road work was completed, and all the roads going into the town were gravelled.

The Methodist Episcopal Church was formally organized on October 17, 1835, by Reverend William Frazell, who served as an itinerant minister.

Richwood was incorporated as a village in March 1835, and by 1840 twenty-five families were listed as living in Richwood. As of 1877, the town contained one newspaper, two banks, three churches, one brick school-house, and several stores and factories.

== Geography ==
According to the United States Census Bureau, the village has a total area of 1.28 square miles (3.32 km^{2}), of which 1.25 square miles (3.24 km^{2}) is land and 0.03 square miles (0.08 km^{2}) is water.

Richwood is at the junction of Ohio State Routes 37 and 47.

== Demographics ==
Historical population
Census	Pop.	Note	%±
1850	164		—
1860	246		50.0%
1870	436		77.2%
1880	1,317		202.1%
1890	1,415		7.4%
1900	1,640		15.9%
1910	1,728		5.4%
1920	1,601		−7.3%
1930	1,573		−1.7%
1940	1,628		3.5%
1950	1,866		14.6%
1960	2,137		14.5%
1970	2,072		−3.0%
1980	2,181		5.3%
1990	2,186		0.2%
2000	2,156		−1.4%
2010	2,229		3.4%
2020	2,222		−0.3%
U.S. Decennial Census

=== 2010 census ===
As of the census of 2010, there were 2,229 people, 877 households, and 572 families residing in the village. The population density was 1,783.2 inhabitants per square mile (688.5/km^{2}). There were 969 housing units at an average density of 775.2 per square mile (299.3/km^{2}). The racial makeup of the village was 98.3% White, 0.4% African American, 0.2% Native American, 0.1% from other races, and 0.9% from two or more races. Hispanic or Latino of any race were 0.7% of the population.

There were 877 households, of which 40.6% had children under the age of 18 living with them, 45.7% were married couples living together, 13.3% had a female householder with no husband present, 6.2% had a male householder with no wife present, and 34.8% were non-families. 29.6% of all households were made up of individuals, and 14.1% had someone living alone who was 65 years of age or older. The average household size was 2.54 and the average family size was 3.14.

The median age in the village was 34.2 years. 29.6% of residents were under the age of 18; 7.5% were between the ages of 18 and 24; 28.2% were from 25 to 44; 22% were from 45 to 64; and 12.7% were 65 years of age or older. The gender makeup of the village was 47.4% male and 52.6% female.

=== 2000 census ===
As of the census of 2000, there were 2,156 people, 849 households, and 567 families residing in the village. The population density was 1,795.2 inhabitants per square mile (693.1/km^{2}). There were 957 housing units at an average density of 796.9 per square mile (307.7/km^{2}). The racial makeup of the village was 97.96% White, 0.23% African American, 0.14% Native American, 0.09% Asian, 0.19% from other races, and 1.39% from two or more races. Hispanic or Latino of any race were 0.32% of the population.

There were 849 households, out of which 35.8% had children under the age of 18 living with them, 52.5% were married couples living together, 11.0% had a female householder with no husband present, and 33.1% were non-families. 28.2% of all households were made up of individuals, and 15.8% had someone living alone who was 65 years of age or older. The average household size was 2.54 and the average family size was 3.12.

In the village, the population was spread out, with 29.3% under the age of 18, 7.9% from 18 to 24, 29.3% from 25 to 44, 19.4% from 45 to 64, and 14.1% who were 65 years of age or older. The median age was 33 years. For every 100 females there were 90.1 males. For every 100 females age 18 and over, there were 87.6 males.

The median income for a household in the village was $39,550, and the median income for a family was $47,656. Males had a median income of $33,393 versus $21,971 for females. The per capita income for the village was $16,799. About 6.6% of families and 8.4% of the population were below the poverty line, including 9.0% of those under age 18 and 12.7% of those age 65 or over.

== Education and library ==
Richwood is the home of the North Union Local School District. The North Union High School football team is known as the Wildcats.

The Richwood-North Union Public Library (RNUPL) was founded in 1915 and is a member of the Serving Every Ohioan Consortium.

== Notable people ==
- Todd Gibson - Former American Indy Car Racer
- Martha Root- teacher of the Baháʼí Faith
- Wallace Clement Sabine - inventor of the modern-day science of architectural acoustics
- Gary Shirk - Former Professional football player for the New York Giants
- John Marshall Hamilton (1847-1905), United States Senator and 18th Governor of Illinois (1883-1885) was born in Union County near Richwood.

== Gallery ==
June 7, 2010, N. Franklin St.

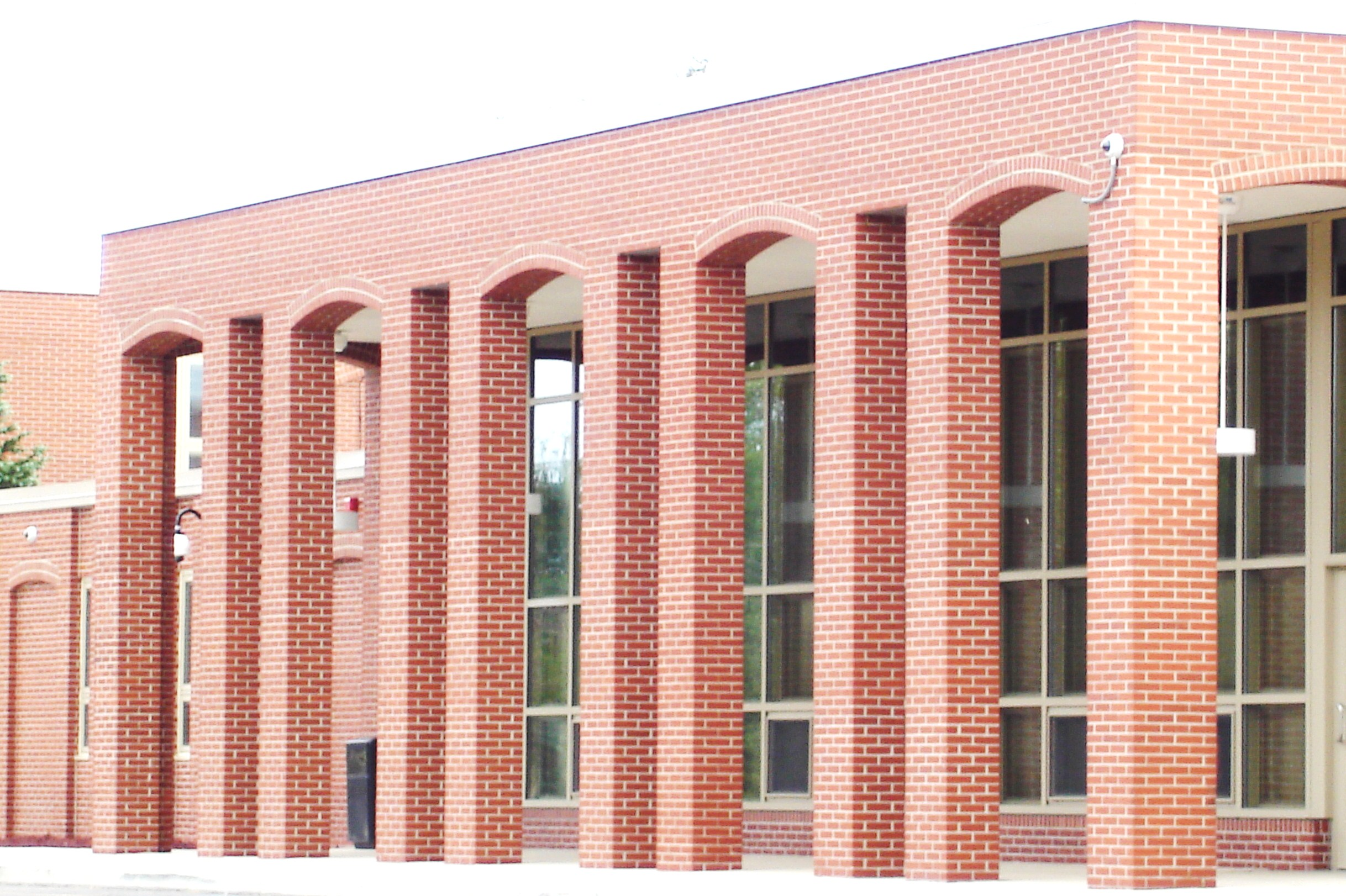
North Union High School, Richwood

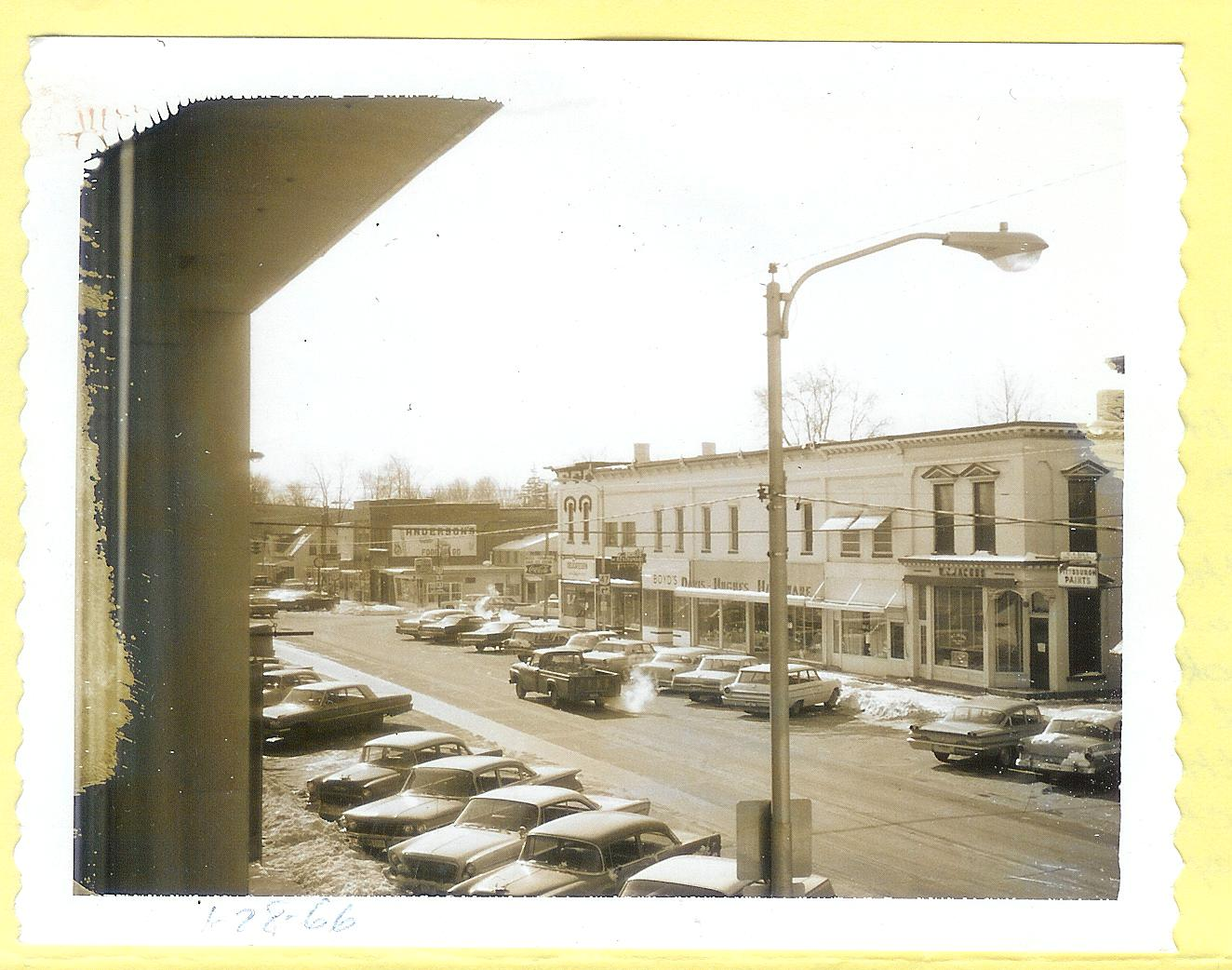
28 Jan 1966, N. Franklin St.

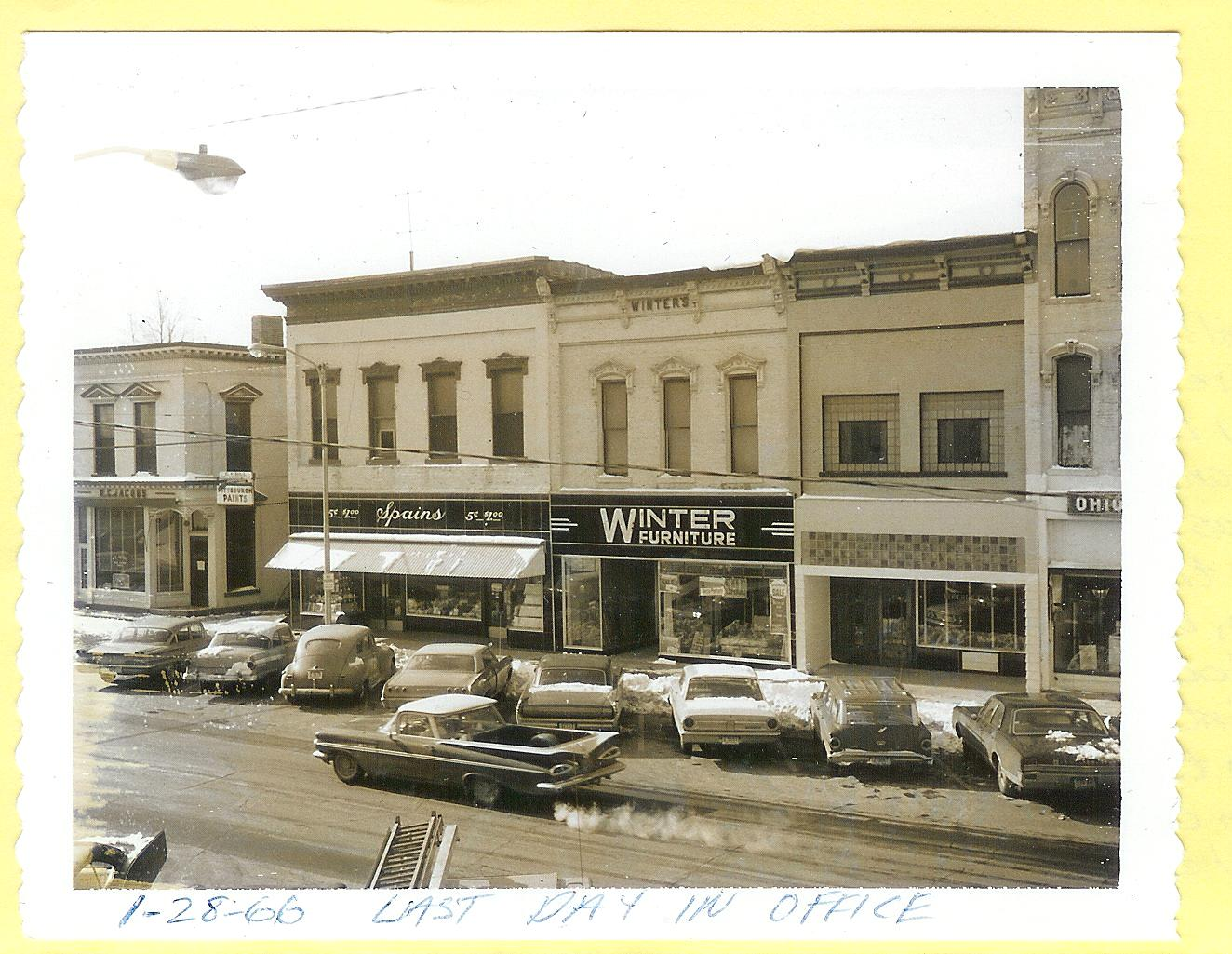
28 Jan 1966, N. Franklin St.

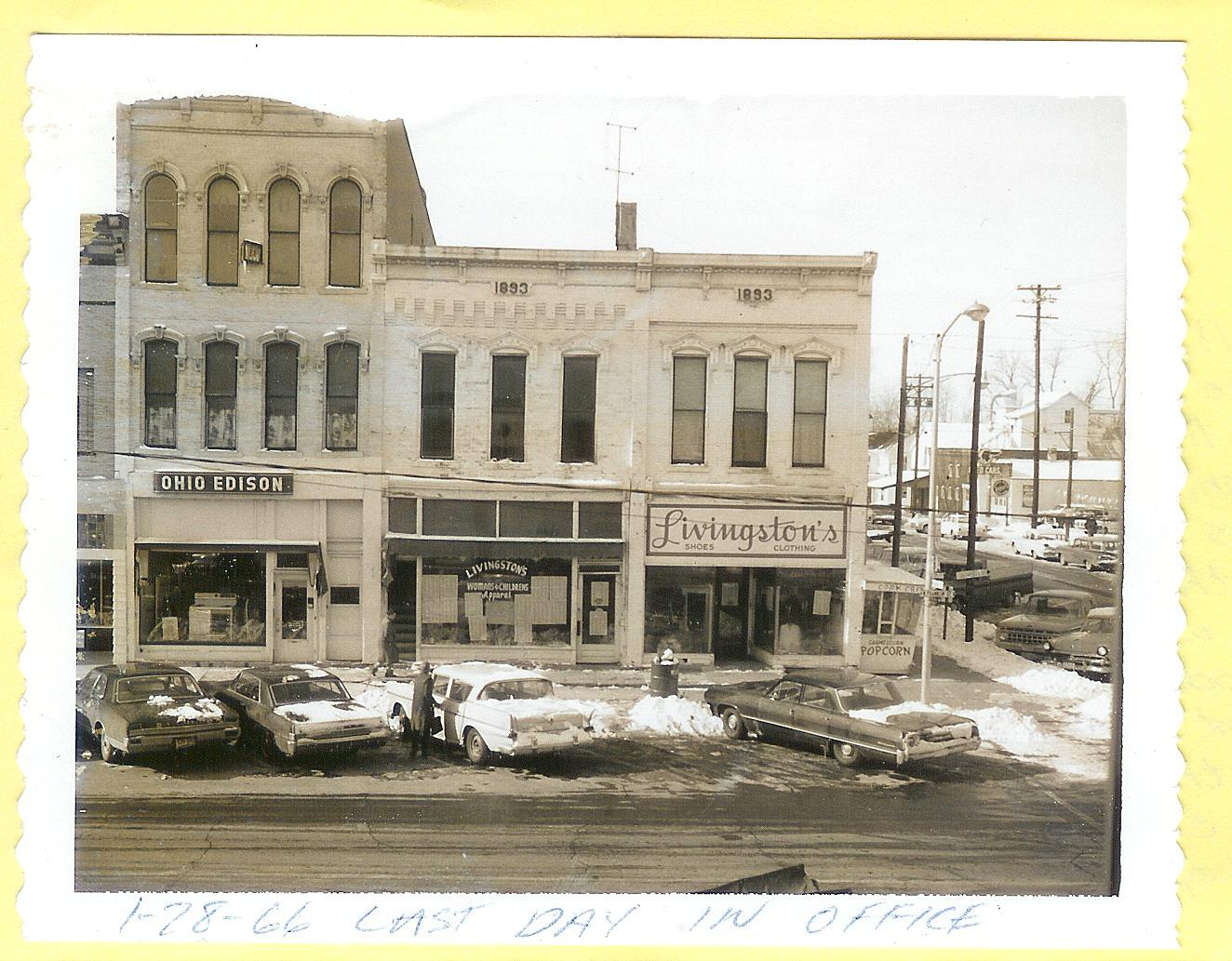
28 Jan 1966, N. Franklin St.

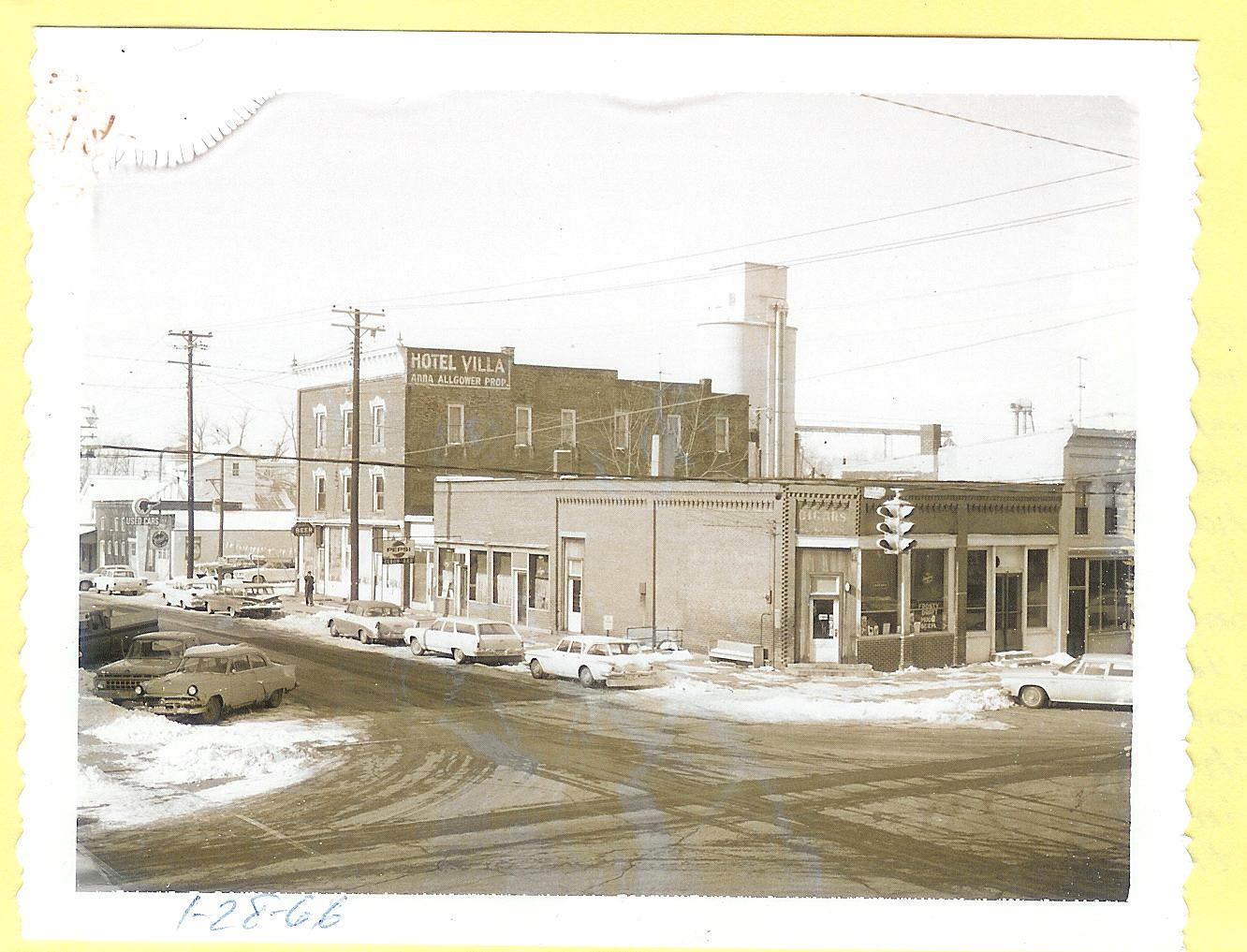
28 Jan 1966, N. Franklin St.

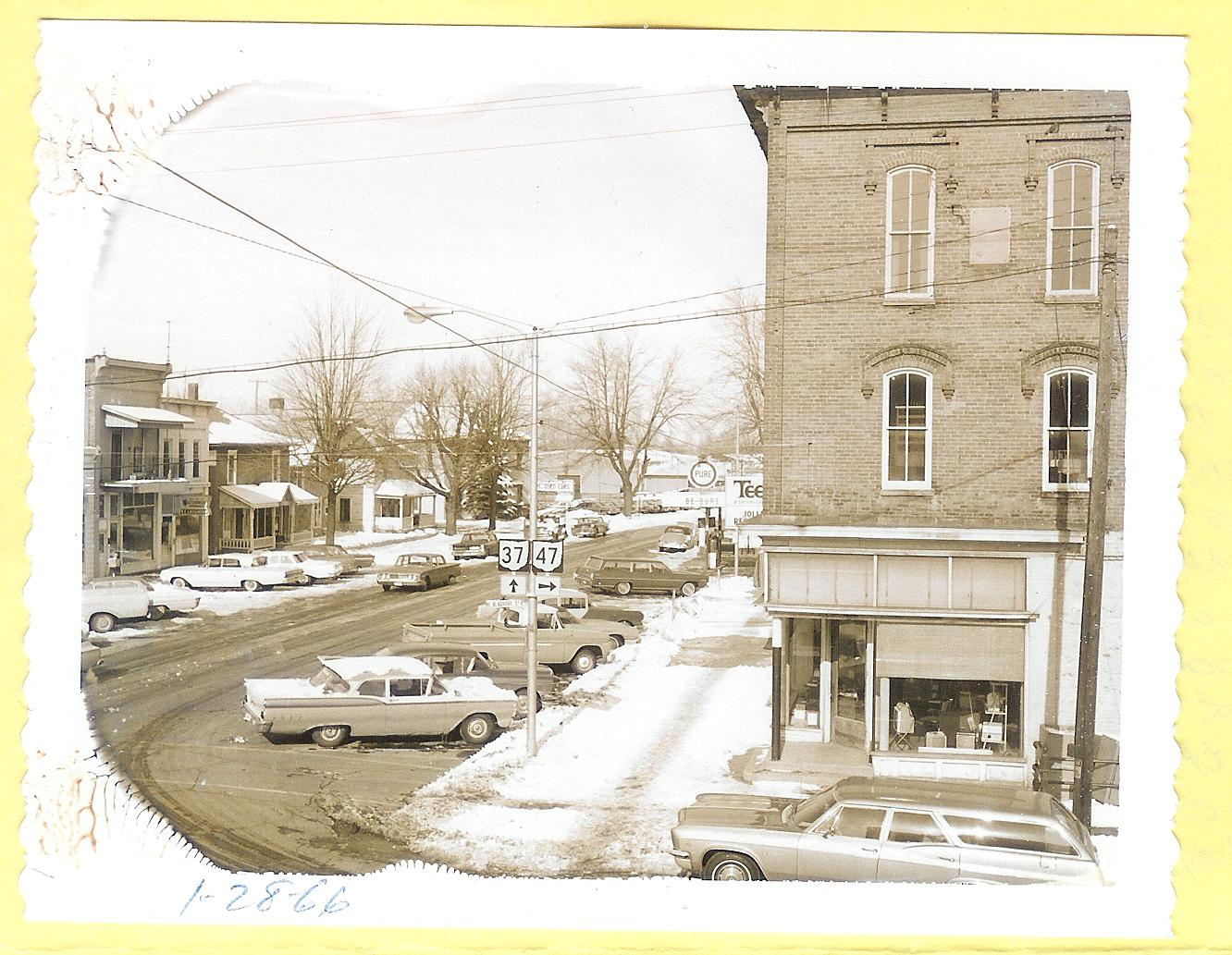
28 Jan 1966, N. Franklin St.

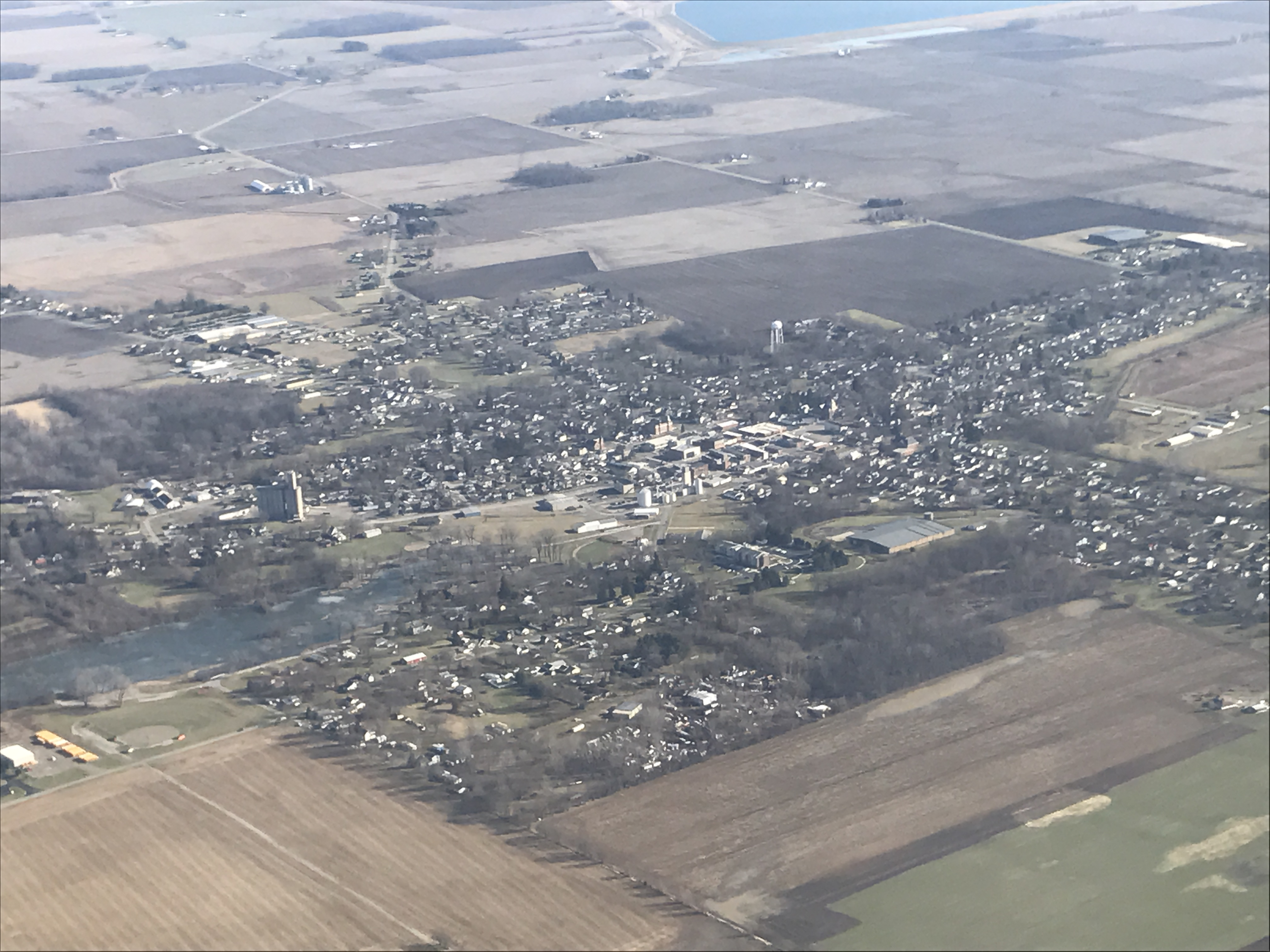
Aerial photo of Richwood
