= Thomas Dillon =

American serial killer (1950–2011)

- Mugshot of Dillon
- Born: July 9, 1950; Canton, Ohio, U.S.
- Died: October 21, 2011 (aged 61); Columbus, Ohio, U.S.
- Other name: Ohio Outdoorsman Killer
- Conviction: Aggravated murder (5 counts)
- Penalty: 165 years to life imprisonment

Details
- Victims: 5 known
- Span of crimes: April 1, 1989 – April 5, 1992
- Country: U.S.
- State: Ohio
- Weapons: .308 Mauser rifle; 6.5×55mm Swedish Mauser Rifle
- Date apprehended: November 27, 1992

Thomas Lee Dillon (July 9, 1950 – October 21, 2011) was an American serial killer who shot and killed at least five men in southeastern Ohio, beginning April 1, 1989, and continuing until April 1992. He was nicknamed "Killer" for boasting about shooting hundreds of animals.

== Life and crimes ==
Dillon was born in Canton, Ohio and was a resident of nearby Magnolia. He had a wife and son and was employed for twelve years as a draftsman at the Canton Ohio Waterworks. He graduated in 1972 from Ohio State University in journalism.

Between the period of April 1, 1989 to April 5, 1992, Dillon shot and killed five people in Ohio. His fourth victim, Claude Hawkins, was shot on federal property and was the reason the FBI stepped in to join the investigation along with officers from the other three counties and the Ohio Department of Natural Resources. It was after this that the death of Kevin Loring was changed from an accident to a homicide.

Ten days after the task force meeting, Dillon shot his fifth victim, Gary Bradley, in Noble County, Ohio. Dillon was placed under surveillance in 1992 when a friend reported him after hearing the task force's initial press release concerning the murders. Dillon later shot at Larry Ohler of Barnhill, Ohio, who was out hunting in Tuscarawas County, but Ohler escaped uninjured.

In August 1992, after a press conference to build leads from the public, Dillon's high school friend Richard Fry told investigators that Dillon exhibited "suspicious" behavior, such as shooting out store windows, street signs, and cars. While under surveillance, Dillon was seen burning buildings and killing animals. He was surveyed also by an aviation unit.

== Arrest ==
In July 1992, Thomas Dillon reached a plea agreement with prosecutors involving two counts of possessing an illegal silencer and he was placed under probation. The agreement prohibited him from possessing firearms. He was then arrested for buying a handgun at a Cleveland gun show on November 27, 1992.

After an initial search of Dillon's home, they found no weapons or ammo. They asked the public for information and asked anyone who bought or sold a gun or ammunition from or to Dillon to come forward. An individual told investigators he'd bought a Swedish Mauser rifle and after a F.B.I. ballistics test, the gun was confirmed to be a 100 percent match with the one used to kill Bradley and a 90 percent match for Hawkins’ homicide.

After the death penalty was removed as an option for punishment, Dillon admitted to the killings. On July 12, 1993, at the Noble County Courthouse, Dillon pleaded guilty to the five murders. Dillon was incarcerated at the Southern Ohio Correctional Facility for five consecutive sentences of thirty years to life for aggravated murders.

== Victims ==
Dillon's shooting victims were:

- Donald Welling, 35, of Strasburg, Ohio on April 1, 1989, while walking or jogging on Tuscarawas County Road 94.
- Jamie Paxton, 21, of Bannock, Ohio on Nov. 10, 1990, while deer hunting in Belmont County.
- Kevin Loring, 30, of Duxbury, Massachusetts on Nov. 28, 1990, while deer hunting in Muskingum County.
- Claude Hawkins, 48, of Mansfield, Ohio on March 14, 1992, while fishing at Wills Creek dam in Coshocton County.
- Gary Bradley, 44, of Williamstown, West Virginia, on April 5, 1992, while fishing in Caldwell, Ohio in Noble County.

Dillon was also investigated in connection with the unsolved shooting death of John Joseph Harvat on November 28, 1984, at a hunting camp in Wetmore Township, Pennsylvania. In 1993, officials in Coshocton County notified the Pennsylvania State Police that Dillon had been named a suspect in several similar shootings in Ohio, but Dillon refused to discuss Harvat's case with police.

In 2020, suspicion was placed on Dillon of having murdered Doug Estes and Jim Bennett, two hunters shot in rural Michigan in 1990. A Michigan man, Jeff Titus, had been convicted of the murders in 2002. In 2023, a judge ordered the murder convictions to be vacated and for Titus to be released.

== Death ==
Dillon was hospitalized on October 4 and died on October 21, 2011. He died in the prison wing at Corrections Medical Center in Columbus, Ohio, aged 61, after being ill for nearly three weeks due to an unspecified illness.

== In popular culture ==
- Crime Stories: "The Silent Sniper," 46:00 min. at dailymotion.com

- The Discovery Channel television series The FBI Files episode "Human Prey," S1, E3, Air date: 1998, depicts how a letter to a local newspaper provides a crucial clue to end Dillon's killing spree.
- The Court TV (now TruTV) television series Crime Stories disclosed Dillon's crimes in the episode "The Silent Sniper," in 2009.
- In 2013 Investigation Discovery show Evil, I made an episode about the case (Season 2 Episode 5 - "Hunting Humans")
- In 2020, the TV show Killer in Question made an episode about the murdered Michigan hunters, in which Dillon is suspected to be responsible.
- The Oxygen television series, Twisted Killers highlights the case on the 7th Episode "The Sniper's Bullet"

== See also ==
- List of serial killers in the United States
- List of serial killers by number of victims
