= 1986 Caldwell cross country team =

High school cross country running team season

The 1986 Caldwell, Ohio boys cross country running team has been recognized as the 1986 National Championship High School boys cross country team regardless of size. The team had a regular season record of 137 wins and 0 losses. The team also set Ohio High School Boys Cross Country State Meet records for lowest point total (26) as well as largest margin of victory (85).

The team's efforts, and the legacy that followed, led the Ohio High School Athletic Association (OHSAA) to call Caldwell High School "The most successful school in Ohio boys cross country."

== Background ==
Caldwell High School began its cross country program in 1971, and head coach Ron Martin began coaching in Caldwell in 1975. The village, located in Ohio's Appalachian foothills in Noble County, covers 0.90 square miles and has a population of less than 2,000 people. The cross country team found some success in Coach Martin's early seasons, but the team's fortunes really started to change starting with the 1983 team, which featured freshmen Tony Carna, P.J. Norris, and Randy Lowe.

Carna, who would go on to win three straight individual state championships at the Class A (small school) level, fell in love with running at a young age, while Norris and Lowe came to embrace it after playing other sports. Carna set a standard of excellence and didn't cut corners. Norris drove him and provided strong leadership. Lowe brought hustle and heart and continued improving race by race and year by year.

The 1983 team, which included only seven runners, came up just shy of winning the Class A team state championship, losing 94–96 to McDonald. It was the team's only loss of the season, and Caldwell finished the year with a 133–1 record.

The 1984 season built on the strength of the 1983 campaign. New freshmen runners—Brian Norris, Stacy Huffman, and Danny Lowe—complimented the strong sophomore class. Once again, Caldwell won every race leading into the postseason, and once again, everything came down to the state championship.

The championship was in sight—but a few hundred yards from the finish line, Danny Lowe became dehydrated and faded due to heatstroke. And without a strong enough finish from other runners, Caldwell just missed out on the state title once again, losing in heartbreaking fashion, 79–80, to Dayton Christian.

== The decision ==
Coach Martin couldn't bear to lose the state championship like that again. So after lots of soul-searching, he reached a difficult decision, one that could potentially backfire: he petitioned the Ohio High School Athletic Association to allow Caldwell to move up and face bigger schools in as many meets as possible. He thought the plan would leave the team better-equipped to handle the level of competition in the state meet.

As Coach Martin recalls, “we weren’t facing competitive enough teams to properly prepare for the state meet. We were untested during the regular season, and the team had to have more pressure, more grit, and maybe even understand what it is like to lose before the big meet.”

After state officials gave Coach Martin the green light, Caldwell attempted to move up to face larger-division schools for as many races as it could.

Caldwell would now be running against the best teams from every corner of the state—teams like Mentor, from the Cleveland area; Westerville North, a suburb of Columbus; and Cincinnati Elder and St. Xavier out of Cincinnati. Some of the schools had 10 or 20 times the students of Caldwell High School.

Coach Martin expected his team to struggle and maybe even lose a few meets in 1985. But due to a well-refined training program, a hilly, challenging terrain to practice on, and strong brotherly bonds between the runners, the team rose to the challenge ahead of them, going undefeated.

The team earned the state championship with a score of 33 points.

== The 1986 season ==
All of Caldwell's success set the stage for 1986. The group—after earning so much acclaim and winning the long-coveted state championship—could have rested on its laurels and gotten complacent, but instead, the team became even stronger and more closely aligned.

They embodied one of Coach Martin's favorite sayings: “when excellence is in sight, good is not enough.”

Led by seniors Carna, P.J. Norris and Randy Lowe, juniors Brian Norris, Stacy Huffman and Danny Lowe, and with freshman Steve Ferguson coming into his own, Caldwell breezed through its schedule in dominating fashion. In multiple races, Caldwell finished 1-2-3-4-5 for a perfect team score of 15.

Among the team's most impressive wins that season was the Tiffin Invitational, in which Caldwell topped a crowded field of 20 large-school teams with a winning score of 29 points. Against the top five finishers from all the other schools combined, Caldwell would have still won, 29–32.

Caldwell went on to win the state championship again, this time with a team score of 26 points.

== Recognition ==
At the time, there were no national championship events like Nike Cross Nationals, depriving Caldwell the chance of racing head-to-head against the top schools from other states.

Aron and David Taylor, writing their XCLegacy series for milesplit in 2009, sought to identify the nation's best teams from years past and retroactively named Caldwell the top team in 1986. "No small school in the country has had as much of an impact on U.S. distance running as the Redskins from Caldwell,” they wrote, recounting how the team "tore through the '86 season with a vengeance in an almost seek-and-destroy mentality."

The program would win eight consecutive state championships from 1985 to 1992.

The 1986 Team along with the other Caldwell Boys State Championship teams ('73, '85, '87, '88, '89, '90, '91, '92) were recognized in 2016 at a Caldwell High School Basketball game in which banners were hung in the Gym to recognize their teams accomplishments.

The program's rise to glory is detailed in the 2025 book Too Small to Win: How a Cross Country Team From Rural Ohio Won a National Championship and Built a Legacy, written by Coach Ron Martin and Randy Lowe.

== 1986 team members ==
The 1986 varsity team members included;

- Seniors: Tony Carna, P.J. Norris, Randy Lowe
- Juniors: Brian Norris, Stacy Huffman, Danny Lowe
- Freshman: Steve Ferguson
- Coaches: Head Coach Ron Martin Assistant Coach: Dugan Hill

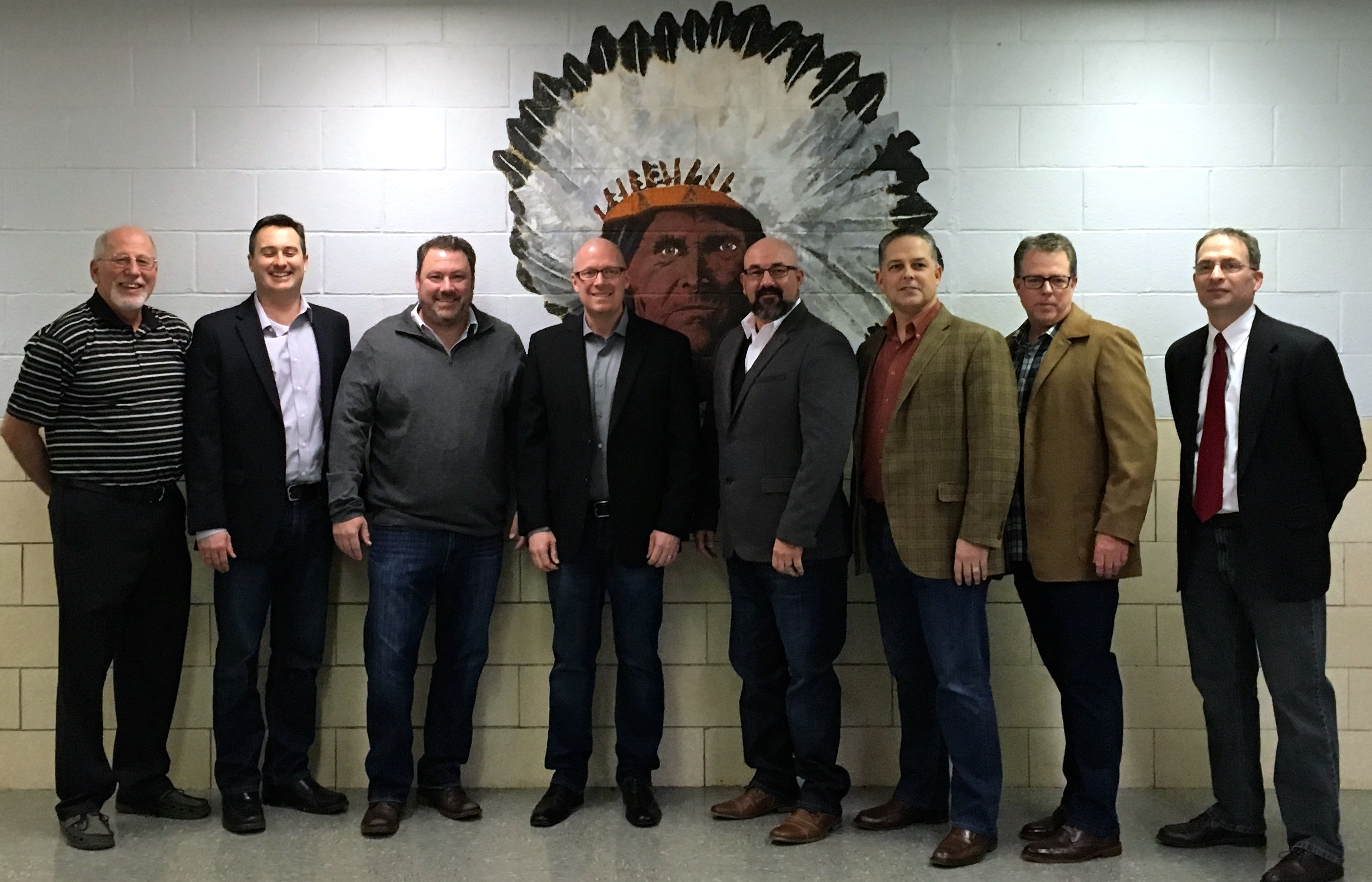
l to r, Ron Martin, Steve Ferguson, Danny Lowe, Randy Lowe, Stacy Huffman, Brian Norris, P.J. Norris, Tony Carna Picture taken Feb 2016

== Caldwell 1986 Season Record (137-0; duel meet scoring) ==
Meet	Team Performance
Newcomerstown Invitational	Won with 24 points
Akron Firestone Invitational	Won with 27 points
Fort Frye Dual	Won with 15 points
Tiffin Invitational	Won with 29 points over 21 teams
Waterford-Belpre Tri-meet	Won with 15 points
Brookville Invitational	Won with 25 points
Newcomerstown Dual	Won with 15 points
Malone College Invitational	Won with 67 points over 30 teams
Skyvue Dual	Won with 15 points
Coaches Classic	Won with 30 points
Zanesville Invitational	Won with 16 points
PVC Invitational	Won with 15 points
District Championships	Won with 16 points
Region Championships	Won with 19 points

1986 Ohio State Championships
Ohio State Championships	Won with 26 points

== Members of the Ohio Association of Track and Field and Cross Country (OATCCC) Hall of Fame ==
- Dugan Hill 1996 Induction
- Ron Martin 1997 Induction
- Tony Carna 2006 Induction

== 1987 and following seasons ==
The 1987 followed the next year with a record low 25 points at the state meet. The program began in 1971. From 1971- 1992 the program finished state team runner up and team champions a total of 12 times during those initial 22 years of the program.
