= Noble County Courthouse =

Noble County Courthouse may refer to:

- Noble County Courthouse (Indiana), Albion, Indiana
- Noble County Courthouse (Ohio), Caldwell, Ohio
- Noble County Courthouse (Oklahoma), Perry, Oklahoma
