= Libraries Connect Ohio =

Libraries Connect Ohio (LCO) is an internet resource provided by all libraries in the state of Ohio. LCO provides premium subscription databases for use of all Ohioans with a library card or school ID. Libraries Connect Ohio has various networks aimed at different demographics. It works to provide information to Ohioans in an easy and informative manner, so that they can be informed.

LCO is a collaborative effort done by the libraries of Ohio and these organizations:

- Ohio Public Library Information Network (OPLIN) - for Public Libraries
- INFOhio - for K-12 students
- OhioLINK- for College Students
