= The Iron Giant (soundtrack) =

1999 soundtrack albums

The Iron Giant is the 1999 animated science fiction film directed by Brad Bird (in his feature directorial debut) for Warner Bros. Feature Animation. The film featured original score composed by Michael Kamen, in his first and only collaboration with Bird, as all his future films were scored by Michael Giacchino beginning with The Incredibles (2004). The score featured additional performance from the Czech Philharmonic symphony orchestra at Prague, conducted by Kamen himself and recording of the score happened within one week.

The film had two soundtracks being released for the promotions of the film. The first soundtrack is a collection of compilation songs performed by popular artists from the 1950s and 1960s, while the second featured Kamen's original score and a song which he performed along with Eric Clapton. All the two albums were released by Rhino Entertainment and Varèse Sarabande in August 1999. The score album had subsequent releases: a vinyl remastered album published by Mondo and a deluxe edition, containing additional material from the score, including a vinyl release in the future.

The score received positive critical reception, praising Kamen's composition. For his score, Kamen won the Annie Award for Music in an Animated Feature Production.

== Production ==
Bird's original temp score, "a collection of Bernard Herrmann cues from '50s and '60s sci-fi films," initially scared Kamen. Believing the sound of the orchestra is important to the feeling of the film, Kamen "decided to comb eastern Europe for an "old-fashioned" sounding orchestra and went to Prague to hear Vladimir Ashkenazy conduct the Czech Philharmonic in Strauss's An Alpine Symphony." Eventually, the Czech Philharmonic was the orchestra used for the film's score, with Bird describing the symphony orchestra as "an amazing collection of musicians." The score for The Iron Giant was recorded in a rather unconventional manner, compared to most films: recorded over one week at the Rudolfinum in Prague, the music was recorded without conventional uses of syncing the music, in a method Kamen described in a 1999 interview as "[being able to] play the music as if it were a piece of classical repertoire."

== Reception ==
Heather Pheras of Allmusic wrote "Michael Kamen's orchestral score for The Iron Giant reflects the childlike wonder and impressive quality of this triumphant animated film." James Southall of Movie Wave called the score as his personal favourite, saying "Everything about it is just in a different class from most modern film music. The performance, by the Czech Philharmonic, shows just what a difference a good orchestra can make to a score when the conductor allows them a degree of freedom of expression; and Steve McLaughlin's recording showcases all of the orchestra's strongest assets. Those willing to approach the score with an open mind, and willing to give it a few chances to allow Kamen's delicately-woven web to envelop them, are in for a real treat. So few film composers were able to write music of this incredible structure and detail, where every piece has a beginning, a middle and an end, where the score as a whole actually goes on a journey from one place to another; Michael Kamen, you will be sorely missed."

Filmtracks.com wrote "The music relies on its sheer weight to define itself, and because of its great recording and creative orchestrations, it works. But it remains difficult not to speculate about how immensely rewarding The Iron Giant might have been if the themes for the boy and robot were better enunciated. Some might say that such catering is unnecessary and the vagueness is an impressive attribute. But without readily identifiable themes, the score has no calling card outside of its huge heart." Jonathan Broxton wrote "For many film score fans, Michael Kamen is a love-him-or-loathe-him composer who, despite having written such wonderful works as Mr. Holland's Opus and Don Juan DeMarco, still has a fair amount of detractors. Hopefully, The Iron Giant will dispel the misconceptions about Kamen's talent and make more people aware of the gifts he has." Broxton referred it as "most surprisingly accomplished film scores of the year".

Dan Goldwasser of Soundtrack.Net wrote "The Iron Giant was a great piece of film (which sadly got overlooked by many) and it was up to Kamen to provide the emotional core through the music. He does everything right – the orchestra is large and powerful, the music is sweeping and emotional – but the lack of a central theme makes this score sound like underscore." Pete Simons of Synchrotones opined that "The Iron Giant is a great film with a great score, which you can now study note by note." Reviewing for the deluxe edition, Zanobard Reviews praised the music and said "Michael Kamen's score for The Iron Giant is utterly magical, and an incredible listening experience from beginning to end as a result. It's odd in that you wouldn't really expect a film score like this to work in concept; it has barely any themes and works much more like a symphony than a score, and yet the orchestration tells the story of Hogarth and the Giant so brilliantly that it doesn't even need themes to understand what's going on. From the light flurries of strings for Hogarth's adventures to the proudly hopeful brass for the heroism of the Giant, it works amazingly well. That combined with a really well-crafted, almost classical orchestral sound and many a wonderful new track as a result of Varèse Sarabande's excellent new deluxe edition not only makes Kamen's work here an incredible soundtrack, but also cements it as one of the better film scores for an animated film around."

== Track listing ==
=== Soundtrack ===
The Iron Giant (Original Motion Picture Soundtrack)

Soundtrack album by Various artists
- Released: August 3, 1999
- Genres: classical; pop; jazz
- Length: 41:12
- Label: Rhino

The Iron Giant (Original Motion Picture Soundtrack) is the soundtrack album, consisting a compilation of classical, pop and jazz songs from the 1950s and 1960s (seven of the songs appear in the film, but the other five are inspired by the movie). It also included two tracks from Kamen's score, which was published by Rhino Entertainment on August 3, 1999 in CDs and cassettes.

No.	Title	Performer(s)	Length
1.	"Blast Off"	The Tyrones	2:28
2.	"Rockin' In The Orbit"	Jimmie Haskell	1:50
3.	"Kookie's Mad Pad"	Edd Byrnes	2:06
4.	"Salt Peanuts"	The Nutty Squirrels	2:18
5.	"Comin' Home Baby"	Mel Tormé	2:43
6.	"Cha-Hua-Hua"	Eddie Platt	2:09
7.	"Let's Do The Cha-Cha"	The Magnificents	2:07
8.	"Blues Walk"	Lou Donaldson	6:43
9.	"I Got a Rocket in My Pocket"	Jimmie Logsdon	2:21
10.	"Searchin'"	The Coasters	2:45
11.	"Honeycomb"	Jimmie Rodgers	2:17
12.	"Destination Moon"	Ames Brothers	2:30
13.	"You Can Be... (music used: "The Eye of the Storm" and "Bedtime Stories")"	Michael Kamen	4:48
14.	"...Who You Choose To Be (music used: "Souls Don't Die")"	Michael Kamen	4:07
Total length:			41:12

Other songs used in the film include:

- "Blue Rumba" by Pepe Dominguin
- "The Genius After Hours" by Ray Charles
- "Capitalizing" by Babs Gonzales
- "Little Bitty Pretty One" by Bobby Day (Signature Edition only)

=== Score ===
==== Standard edition ====
The Iron Giant (Original Motion Picture Score)

Film score by Michael Kamen
- Released: August 24, 1999
- Recorded: 1998–99
- Genre: Film score
- Length: 49:43
- Label: Varèse Sarabande

The Iron Giant (Original Motion Picture Score) is the score album, consisting of 23 tracks of the score, composed and produced by Kamen. It also includes an original song "Souls Don't Die" performed by Kamen and Eric Clapton. The album was released by Varèse Sarabande on August 24, 1999. A 2-disc vinyl edition of the soundtrack was published by Mondo and released on September 18, 2014.

No.	Title	Length
1.	"The Eye of the Storm"	2:31
2.	"Hogarth Hughes"	0:21
3.	"Into the Forest"	3:33
4.	"The Giant Wakes"	1:25
5.	"Come and Get It"	1:46
6.	"Cat and Mouse"	0:54
7.	"Train Wreck"	1:05
8.	"You Can Fix Yourself?"	1:20
9.	"Hand Underfoot"	2:02
10.	"Bedtime Stories"	2:26
11.	"We Gotta Hide"	0:50
12.	"His Name Is Dean"	0:48
13.	"Eating Art"	0:43
14.	"Space Car"	0:59
15.	"Souls Don't Die" (performed by Michael Kamen and Eric Clapton)	4:10
16.	"Contest of Wills"	4:35
17.	"The Army Arrives"	1:34
18.	"Annie and Dean"	1:19
19.	"He's a Weapon"	2:43
20.	"The Giant Discovered"	4:27
21.	"Trance-Former"	4:26
22.	"No Following"	4:02
23.	"The Last Giant Piece"	1:44
Total length:		49:43

==== Deluxe edition ====
The Iron Giant (Original Motion Picture Score) [Deluxe Edition]

Film score by Michael Kamen
- Released: March 11, 2022
- Recorded: 1998–99
- Genre: Film score
- Length: 76:58
- Label: Varèse Sarabande

The deluxe edition of the album consisted of 37 tracks, including the tracks from the first release, extended cues featured in the film and pre-recorded cues that were not included in the album. Varèse Sarabande released the album on March 11, 2022. In that May, a vinyl edition of the soundtrack was officially announced by Mondo, and the album was released into a two-disc set on July 22.

No.	Title	Length
1.	"The Eye of the Storm"	2:30
2.	"Hogarth Hughes"	0:21
3.	"Creepy Music / Hogarth Investigates"	1:30
4.	"Into the Forest"	3:33
5.	"The Giant Wakes"	1:24
6.	"Hogarth in Car / Sting for FBI Man: Suite"	0:56
7.	"Come and Get It"	1:45
8.	"Shut Off Switch / Rock Tree: Suite"	1:04
9.	"Cat and Mouse"	0:53
10.	"Train Wreck"	1:07
11.	"Magic Rebuild / Hand Underfoot: Suite"	2:55
12.	"Chew Your Food"	2:01
13.	"Amerika"	1:23
14.	"Great Ride"	1:14
15.	"We Gotta Hide"	0:49
16.	"His Name Is Dean"	0:47
17.	"He Can Stay"	0:39
18.	"Eating Art"	0:42
19.	"Space Car"	0:58
20.	"Souls Don't Die"	4:07
21.	"Contest Of Wills"	4:34
22.	"The Army Arrives"	1:34
23.	"Annie and Dean"	1:18
24.	"I'm Superman"	0:30
25.	"He's a Weapon"	2:43
26.	"Giant Discovered"	4:28
27.	"Trance Former"	4:26
28.	"No Following"	4:02
29.	"The Last Giant Piece"	1:07
30.	"End Credits: Suite"	8:23
31.	"Bedtime Stories"	2:25
32.	"Wild Tam-Tam"	0:19
33.	"Chew Your Food Pickup"	0:44
34.	"Duck and Cover"	0:30
35.	"Early Demo #1"	2:40
36.	"Early Demo #2"	3:52
37.	"Souls Don't Die" (performed by Michael Kamen and Eric Clapton)	2:45
Total length:		76:58

== Release history ==
Region	Date	Format	Editions	Label	Ref.
The Iron Giant (Original Motion Picture Soundtrack)
Various	August 3, 1999	Cassette; CD		Rhino	
The Iron Giant (Original Motion Picture Score)
Various	August 24, 1999	Cassette; CD	Standard	Varèse Sarabande	
Various	September 21, 2014	Vinyl LP	Standard	Mondo	
Various	March 11, 2022	CD	Deluxe	Varèse Sarabande	
Various	July 22, 2022	Vinyl LP	Deluxe	Mondo	

== Personnel ==
Credits adapted from CD liner notes.

- Original score composed and conducted by – Michael Kamen
- Music production – Steve McLaughlin, Teese Gohl, Christopher Brooks, Michael Kamen
- Bass and soloist – "Dean" Chucho Merchan
- Orchestra – The Czech Philharmonic Orchestra
- Orchestration – Blake Neely, Michael Kamen, Robert Elhai
- Recording and mixing – Steve McLaughlin
- Recording engineer – Cenek Kotzmann, Lubomir Novacek, Marlon Kelsey, Oldrich Slezak, Tom Jenkins
- Music editor – Christopher Brooks
- Music preparation – Vic Fraser
- Executive producer – Cary E. Mansfield, Chas Ferry, Robert Townson
- Musical assistance – James Brett, Michael Price
- Production assistance – Lukas Kendall, Moritz Fink
- Art direction – Rob Jones, Mark Shoolery
- Design – Jason Edmiston, Mark Shoolery
- Liner notes – Tim Greiving

== Charts ==
=== Weekly charts ===
Chart (2000)	Peak position
US Billboard 200	100
US Top Internet Albums (Billboard)	11

=== Year-end charts ===
Chart (2000)	Position
US Billboard 200	125
