= Albert D. Whealdon =

American politician

Albert D. Whealdon (May 18, 1868 – November 29, 1963) was an American politician and educator.

Born in Caldwell, Ohio, Whealdon went to Warrensburg Teachers College. He then received his bachelor's degree from University of Missouri and his master's degree from University of Wisconsin–Madison. He also went to Humboldt University of Berlin. He taught in high school and later taught chemistry at Superior State Teachers College (now University of Wisconsin–Superior). In 1942, Whealdon served on the Superior, Wisconsin Common Council and was president of the common council. In 1947, Whealdon served in the Wisconsin State Assembly and was a Republican.
