= Rossford, Ohio =

- City
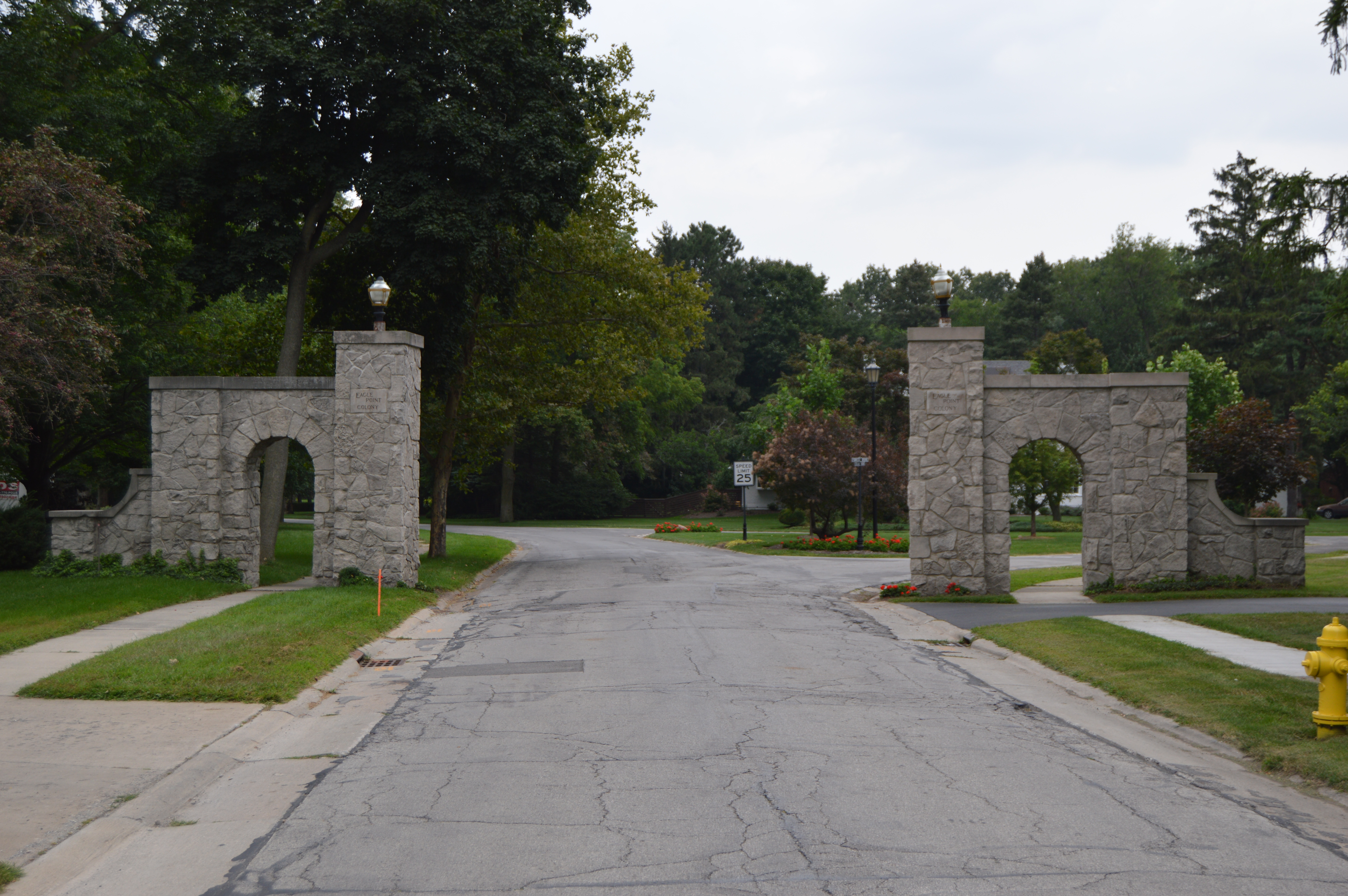
- Gateway to the Eagle Point Colony Historic District neighborhood

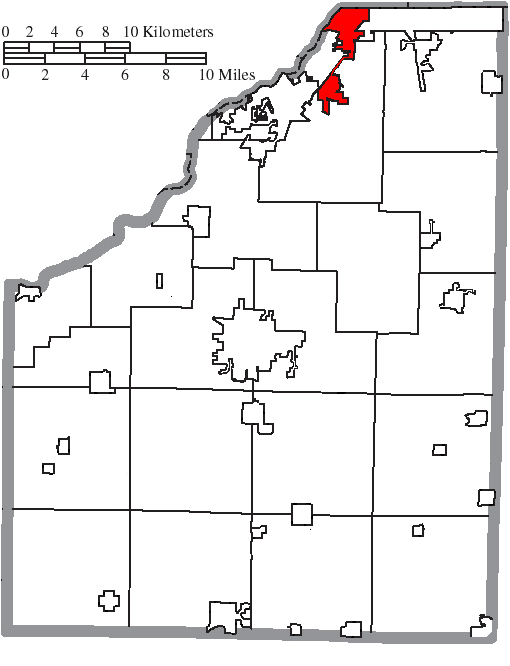
- Location of Rossford in Wood County

- Location within Ohio Location within the United States
- Coordinates: 41°34′52″N 83°34′05″W
- Country: United States
- State: Ohio
- County: Wood

Area
  - Total: 5.20 sq mi (13.46 km^{2})
  - Land: 5.17 sq mi (13.40 km^{2})
  - Water: 0.023 sq mi (0.06 km^{2})
- Elevation: 627 ft (191 m)

Population (2020)
  - Total: 6,299
  - Density: 1,217.5/sq mi (470.07/km^{2})
- Time zone: UTC-5 (Eastern (EST))
  - Summer (DST): UTC-4 (EDT)
- ZIP code: 43460
- Area code: 419/567
- FIPS code: 39-68686
- GNIS feature ID: 1087197
- Website: www.rossfordohio.com

Rossford is a city in Wood County, Ohio, United States, located along the Maumee River in the Toledo metropolitan area. The population was 6,299 at the 2020 census. The town includes the intersection of Interstate 75 and the Ohio Turnpike (Interstates 80 and 90). Rossford Public Library and WPAY serve the community.

Rossford was founded as a company town by Edward Ford of the Libbey-Owens-Ford Glass Company. In 1898, Ford purchased 173 acres (0.70 km^{2}) along the Maumee River to build the Edward Ford Plate Glass Company.

As workers came to the factory, Ford named the resulting town "Rossford" by combining the last name of his second wife, Caroline Ross, with his. Shortly after the foundation of the plant, Ford built the Ford Club next to the plant, so workers could socialize. In 1998, Rossford's centennial, the town built a memorial next to the Ford Club in memory of the foundation of the town. The centennial was marked by a street fair, parade, concert, and several other accommodations.

Edward Ford's father John Baptiste Ford earlier founded Ford City, Pennsylvania as a plate glass company town.

== Geography ==
According to the United States Census Bureau, the city has a total area of 5.33 square miles (13.80 km^{2}), of which 5.02 square miles (13.00 km^{2}) is land and 0.31 square miles (0.80 km^{2}) is water.

== Demographics ==
Historical population
Census	Pop.	Note	%±
1940	3,912		—
1950	3,963		1.3%
1960	4,408		11.2%
1970	5,302		20.3%
1980	5,978		12.7%
1990	5,861		−2.0%
2000	6,406		9.3%
2010	6,293		−1.8%
2020	6,299		0.1%
2025 (est.)	6,369		1.1%

=== 2020 census ===
As of the 2020 census, Rossford had a population of 6,299. The median age was 39.7 years. 20.7% of residents were under the age of 18 and 17.7% of residents were 65 years of age or older. For every 100 females there were 97.0 males, and for every 100 females age 18 and over there were 95.5 males age 18 and over.

100.0% of residents lived in urban areas, while 0.0% lived in rural areas.

There were 2,714 households in Rossford, of which 27.2% had children under the age of 18 living in them. Of all households, 45.7% were married-couple households, 20.6% were households with a male householder and no spouse or partner present, and 25.3% were households with a female householder and no spouse or partner present. About 30.8% of all households were made up of individuals and 11.4% had someone living alone who was 65 years of age or older.

There were 2,837 housing units, of which 4.3% were vacant. The homeowner vacancy rate was 1.4% and the rental vacancy rate was 4.9%.

Racial composition as of the 2020 census
Race	Number	Percent
White	5,589	88.7%
Black or African American	129	2.0%
American Indian and Alaska Native	14	0.2%
Asian	53	0.8%
Native Hawaiian and Other Pacific Islander	1	0.0%
Some other race	94	1.5%
Two or more races	419	6.7%
Hispanic or Latino (of any race)	393	6.2%

=== 2010 census ===
As of the 2010 census, there were 6,293 people, 2,568 households, and 1,705 families residing in the city. The population density was 1,253.6 inhabitants per square mile (484.0/km^{2}). There were 2,800 housing units at an average density of 557.8 per square mile (215.4/km^{2}). The racial makeup of the city was 94.8% White, 1.7% African American, 0.4% Native American, 0.9% Asian, 0.9% from other races, and 1.4% from two or more races. Hispanic or Latino of any race were 3.5% of the population.

There were 2,568 households, of which 31.8% had children under the age of 18 living with them, 50.5% were married couples living together, 11.7% had a female householder with no husband present, 4.2% had a male householder with no wife present, and 33.6% were non-families. 27.8% of all households were made up of individuals, and 9.9% had someone living alone who was 65 years of age or older. The average household size was 2.45 and the average family size was 3.00.

The median age in the city was 39.1 years. 23.6% of residents were under the age of 18; 9.2% were between the ages of 18 and 24; 25.5% were from 25 to 44; 28.4% were from 45 to 64; and 13.3% were 65 years of age or older. The gender makeup of the city was 49.3% male and 50.7% female.

=== 2000 census ===
As of the 2000 census, there were 6,406 people, 2,610 households, and 1,743 families residing in the city. The population density was 1,489.7 inhabitants per square mile (575.2/km^{2}). There were 2,736 housing units at an average density of 636.2 per square mile (245.6/km^{2}). The racial makeup of the city was 96.27% White, 1.28% African American, 0.20% Native American, 0.81% Asian, 0.02% Pacific Islander, 0.48% from other races, and 0.94% from two or more races. Hispanic or Latino of any race were 1.69% of the population.

There were 2,610 households, out of which 32.2% had children under the age of 18 living with them, 52.4% were married couples living together, 10.9% had a female householder with no husband present, and 33.2% were non-families. 28.4% of all households were made up of individuals, and 11.7% had someone living alone who was 65 years of age or older. The average household size was 2.45 and the average family size was 3.04.

In the city, the population was spread out, with 25.4% under the age of 18, 8.7% from 18 to 24, 29.2% from 25 to 44, 22.9% from 45 to 64, and 13.8% who were 65 years of age or older. The median age was 37 years. For every 100 females, there were 92.3 males. For every 100 females age 18 and over, there were 87.7 males.

The median income for a household in the city was $43,776, and the median income for a family was $57,442. Males had a median income of $40,516 versus $27,560 for females. The per capita income for the city was $25,119. About 2.7% of families and 3.7% of the population were below the poverty line, including 3.4% of those under age 18 and 3.0% of those age 65 or over.

== Economy ==
In early 2019, Medical Mutual announced it was moving its Toledo office to Rossford. Amazon operates a fulfillment center in Rossford.

== Education ==
Rossford's school system includes the following:

=== Active schools ===
- Rossford High School (9-12)
- Rossford Junior High School (6-8)
- Rossford Elementary School (PreK-5)
- All Saints Catholic School (PreK-8)

=== Defunct schools ===
- Alter Elementary (now All Saints Catholic School)
- Indian Hills School (opened 1970, closed 2014)
- Lime City School (grades varied, the building was closed in 1982 and demolished in 2013)
- Walnut Street School (demolished)
- Glenwood School (Renovated into Rossford Elementary)
- Eagle Point School (demolished)

== Notable people ==
- Jonathan Bennett, actor
- Erick Iskersky, professional tennis player
- Madalyn Murray O'Hair, Founder of American Atheists, graduated from Rossford High School
- Johnny Paris (ne John Pocisk), musician
- John Payak, professional basketball player
- Eddie Platt, musician
- Dennis Richmond, news anchor
- Dave Yorko, musician
