= Ohio Public Library Information Network =

- Formation: June 12, 1996
- Purpose: provide Internet services to Ohio public libraries for use by Ohioans
- Headquarters: 2323 West Fifth Ave, Suite 130, Columbus, Ohio 43204-4897
- Region served: Ohio
- Director: Don Yarman
- Staff: 5
- Website: OPLIN

The Ohio Public Library Information Network (OPLIN) is a state agency that provides Internet access to the 251 Ohio public libraries for use by the residents of Ohio. OPLIN also provides Ohioans with free home access to high-quality, subscription research databases.

OPLIN's purpose is to ensure that all Ohioans have equal access to information, regardless of its format or location. This information includes Ohio public library resources; regional, state, and federal resources; and electronic information resources.

OPLIN is established by the Ohio Revised Code section 3375.64 as an independent agency within the State Library of Ohio. OPLIN is governed by an eleven-member Board of Trustees, who are appointed by the State Library Board and may serve no more than two consecutive, three-year terms.

== History ==
OPLIN was first conceptualized in 1994, as a group effort of Ohio's public libraries and the Ohio Library Council. Ohio Governor George Voinovich supported the idea in his 1995 State of the State Address, and in June 1995, the organization first appeared in the state budget. OPLIN was officially dedicated by Voinovich on June 12, 1996.

In the 2001 Ecom-Ohio report released by Governor Taft's Office, OPLIN was credited with providing 4,478 public access workstations at local public libraries, almost twice as many available from all other state agencies combined. As of 2015, there are approximately 13,000 public computers in Ohio public libraries.

Up until 2008, OPLIN was re-created every two years in Ohio's biennial budget language. Specifically, OPLIN's governance and budget were defined in separate lines within the State Library of Ohio's budget. OPLIN now exists in permanent law. The Ohio Public Library Information Network is defined in the Ohio Revised Code as "... an independent agency within the state library of Ohio, for the purpose of ensuring equity of access to electronic information for all residents of this state."

== The Ohio Web Library ==
OPLIN and the other partners in Libraries Connect Ohio (including OhioLINK, INFOhio, and State Library of Ohio) purchase subscription databases and make them available to all Ohio citizens as part of the Ohio Web Library. Using IP geolocation, anyone on an Ohio-based computer, whether in a library or at home, has automatic access to these resources. They can also be accessed by anyone using an Ohio public library card.

OPLIN’s Find a Library tool allows users to quickly locate and map libraries around the state, or search all Ohio public library websites in one place.

OPLIN hosts the popular online identification tools What Tree Is It?, What’s That Snake?, and What’s the Point?. Other Ohio-related minisites include Evolution of Ohio.

The OPLIN 4cast is a weekly compilation of public library headlines, topics, and trends, published in a blog format.

What Does This Mean to Me, Laura is a blog that seeks to break down new technologies for library staff.
