= OhioLINK =

Consortium of Ohio libraries

Coordinates: 39.967508°N 83.000079°W

The Ohio Library and Information Network (OhioLINK) is a consortium of Ohio's college and university libraries and the State Library of Ohio. Serving more than 800,000 students, faculty, and staff at 88 institutions with 117 libraries, OhioLINK's membership includes 16 public universities, 23 community/technical colleges, 48 private colleges and the State Library of Ohio. OhioLINK serves faculty, students, staff and other researchers via campus-based integrated library systems, the OhioLINK central site, and Internet resources.

OhioLINK's mission is to create a competitive advantage for Ohio's higher education community by cooperatively and cost-effectively acquiring, providing access to, and preserving an expanding array of print and digital scholarly resources in order to advance teaching, learning, research, and the growth of Ohio's knowledge-based economy.

== History ==
OhioLINK, a cooperative venture of university libraries and the Ohio Board of Regents, grew out of a 1987 recommendation by the board's library committee that "the state of Ohio implement, as expeditiously as possible, a statewide electronic catalog system."

In response to this recommendation, the board established a steering committee representing librarians, faculty, administrators and computer systems managers from campuses throughout Ohio. After meetings, public hearings, and conferences, the committee prepared and distributed a planning paper (November 1988); a Request for Information (February 1989); and a Request for Proposal (August 1989) to initiate a statewide electronic system.

In 1990, OhioLINK selected Innovative Interfaces, Inc to develop the unique software system to create the OhioLINK central catalog and selected Digital Equipment Corporation for the computer hardware base. OhioLINK licensed four databases from University Microfilms International, UMI, for citations to millions of business, newspaper and periodical articles and to academic dissertations. These elements formed the foundation of the growing OhioLINK system of services. In 1992, six universities installed OhioLINK systems and began the ongoing process of building the central catalog. In February 1996, OhioLINK began offering services through the World Wide Web.

OhioLINK is part of Ohio's ongoing tradition in pioneering library automation. The Ohio State University and others in Ohio began integrating campus library systems at an early date. In the 1960s, state funds supported the development of OCLC, then called the Ohio College Library Center. OCLC has since grown into an international organization with a database of 50 million entries representing materials held in more than 10,000 libraries.

On February 4, 2009, OhioLINK suffered a catastrophic hard drive failure. This affected all major services for several days with the exception of the catalog and the DRC, which were not affected. The drive failure resulted in data loss on the Electronic Journal Center; a complete reload of the Electronic Journal Center's content was completed six weeks after the initial crash.

In January 2010, Tom Sanville, executive director of OhioLINK since 1992, announced his resignation.

John Magill served as executive director from 2010 until he left the OhioLINK post in August 2012 to focus on workforce and economic development initiatives at the Ohio Board of Regents.

In October 2012, Gwen Evans was appointed the executive director of OhioLINK by then-Chancellor of the Department of Higher Education Jim Petro.

Also in October 2012, OhioLINK was brought under the umbrella of the Ohio Technology Consortium. OH-TECH provides administrative and technical support to Ohio's statewide technology infrastructure, which includes OhioLINK, the Ohio Academic Resources Network (OARnet), and the Ohio Supercomputer Center (OSC). Funded by the Ohio General Assembly through the Ohio Department of Higher Education, OH-TECH reports to the Chancellor of the Ohio Department of Higher Education.

In June 2017, the Department of Higher Education dissolved the eStudent Services division of OH-TECH and incorporated some staff and services into OhioLINK's portfolio.

In October 2020, Amy Pawlowski was appointed the executive director of OhioLINK by the Chancellor of the Department of Higher Education Randy Gardner.

== Libraries Connect Ohio (LCO) ==
Libraries Connect Ohio (LCO) is a collaborative effort of OhioLINK and the following library organizations:

- INFOhio (virtual library and information network for all Ohio PreK-12 schools)
- Ohio Public Library Information Network (OPLIN)
- State Library of Ohio

These partners are working together to build and provide the Ohio Web Library, a core collection of information resources and library services for all Ohioans.
