= Serving Every Ohioan Library Center =

Serving Every Ohioan Library Consortium
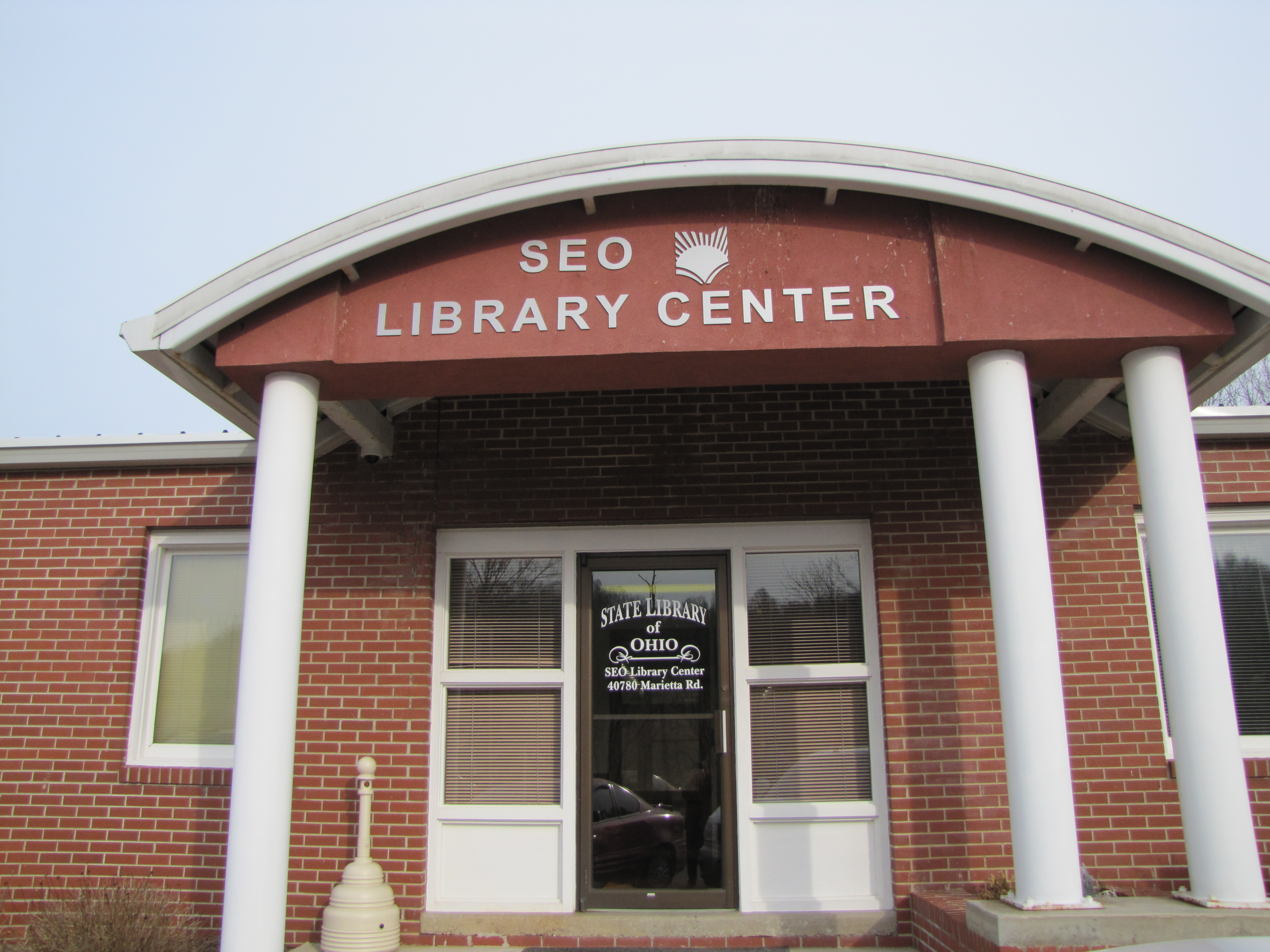
- 39°41′11″N 81°29′45″W
- Location: Caldwell, Ohio
- Established: 1961

Other information
- Director: Dianna Clark
- Employees: 14
- Website: servingeveryohioan.org

The Serving Every Ohioan (SEO) Library Center of the State Library of Ohio, located in Caldwell, Ohio, supports a consortium of 92 library systems at 224 locations in 46 counties. The SEO Library Center houses, maintains and supports a centralized shared catalog database that includes over 8 million items with a patron database of 930,000+ borrowers. The SEO Library Center staff provides technical support as well as software support for all consortium members, alleviating the burden of specialized IT functions on small libraries. The Center houses over 200,000 materials which includes books, entertainment and public performance DVDs, videos and 16mm films, books on tape/cd, playaways, MP3 cds, Ellison letter dies and microfilm/fiche. The SEO Library Center also provides and maintains training facilities through a mobile computer lab and the F. Ward Murrey Annex facility (located next to the SEO Library Center) to state agencies and public libraries across Ohio.

== History ==
The Southeastern Ohio (SEO) Library Center Regional Service Center was established in January 1961 in Caldwell, Ohio with the intent of augmenting the services of twelve libraries in eight counties of Ohio, which were among the state's most impoverished. The eight counties included in the service area were Belmont, Guernsey, Monroe, Morgan, Muskingum, Noble, Perry and Washington. Bookmobile service, resource sharing, reference and materials delivery were some of the services that were extended to these counties. The Regional center started out in a storefront in Caldwell that was 2,400 square feet (220 m^{2}) on two floors with space for about 15,000 volumes plus a meeting space for 30 people, several offices, two bookmobiles and work space. The center had two operating budgets. One budget for the Regional Center and one budget for the bookmobile program. The Center stayed at the location until 1980. The State Library of Ohio leased 13,252 square feet (1,231.2 m^{2}) of office and warehouse space located on South State Route 821. In 1991 the State Library of Ohio purchased the leased property. The center was considered a "strange library" because it was not a "walk-in" type of library. It was to be used for storage and distribution to the regional libraries. Patrons could not borrow directly from the center. It was strictly a library for libraries. Over the years the role of SEO training changed from serving just the southeastern region of Ohio to all of Ohio.

== Services ==
- Maintains shared database of over eight million items for 89 consortium member library systems at 200 locations in 46 counties.
- IT support (consortium members only)
- Offers over 200,000 items for resource sharing, which includes books, DVDs, VHS tapes, books on tape and cd, playaways and mp3s
- Offers public performance DVDs, VHS tapes, 16mm films, Ellison and Accut dies through INFOhio's MediaNet database.
- Reference and article provider
- Brokers OCLC interlibrary loan requests (consortium members only)
- Lends materials to out of state libraries through OCLC
- Gale/Cengage Databases (consortium members only)
- Schedules and transports mobile computer training lab for internet training
- Participates as a lender on Ohio Libraries Share MORE program
- Resource sharing to non-consortium member Ohio public libraries
- Resource sharing to Ohio Correctional Institutions
- Provides talking book machines for residents in five counties who participate in the Ohio Talking Book Program
- Original cataloging when copy records are not available (consortium members only)
- Marc record maintenance and cataloging training (consortium members only)

== Affiliations ==
- State Library of Ohio
- OPLIN
- OhioNET
- OCLC
