= Eddie Platt =

American saxophonist (1921-2010)

- Born: Edward R. Platakis; December 8, 1921; Cleveland, Ohio, U.S.
- Died: October 3, 2010 (aged 88) Akron, Ohio, U.S.
- Genres: Pop
- Instrument: Saxophone

Edward R. "Eddie" Platt (né Platakis; December 8, 1921 – October 3, 2010) was an American saxophonist.

== Early life ==
Platakis was born in Cleveland and raised in Rossford, where he began playing in a band at 16. He adopted the stage surname "Platt" starting in high school. He played gigs in Rossford and Cleveland until World War II, when he served in the Army and Air Force.

== Career ==
After the war, he played in strip clubs with the Johnny Pecon Band. From 1957 to 1967, he began playing the Hotel Manager in Cleveland. In 1955, he recorded his first single for Epic Records, "Rock 'Em" b/w "Chinese Lullaby". His next single was a cover of The Champs' song "Tequila", which reached #20 on the U.S. Billboard Hot 100 in 1958. He also covered The Pets' hit, "Chua-Hua-Hua" for Gone Records, which was featured on the soundtrack to The Iron Giant in 1999.

Following the success of "Tequila", Platt appeared on Perry Como and Dick Clark's television shows, performing live where most acts lip synched. He remained in Cleveland to play shows but backed national acts when they toured there, including Pat Boone, Elvis Presley, Bobby Darin, The Everly Brothers, and The Brothers Four. He self-released a vinyl LP, Dance One, selling about 3,500 copies.

== Personal life ==
In 2001, he married dancer Andrea Edwards. Platt died in Akron, Ohio on October 3, 2010, aged 88.
