= Noble County Courthouse (Ohio) =

Local government building in the United States

The Noble County Courthouse
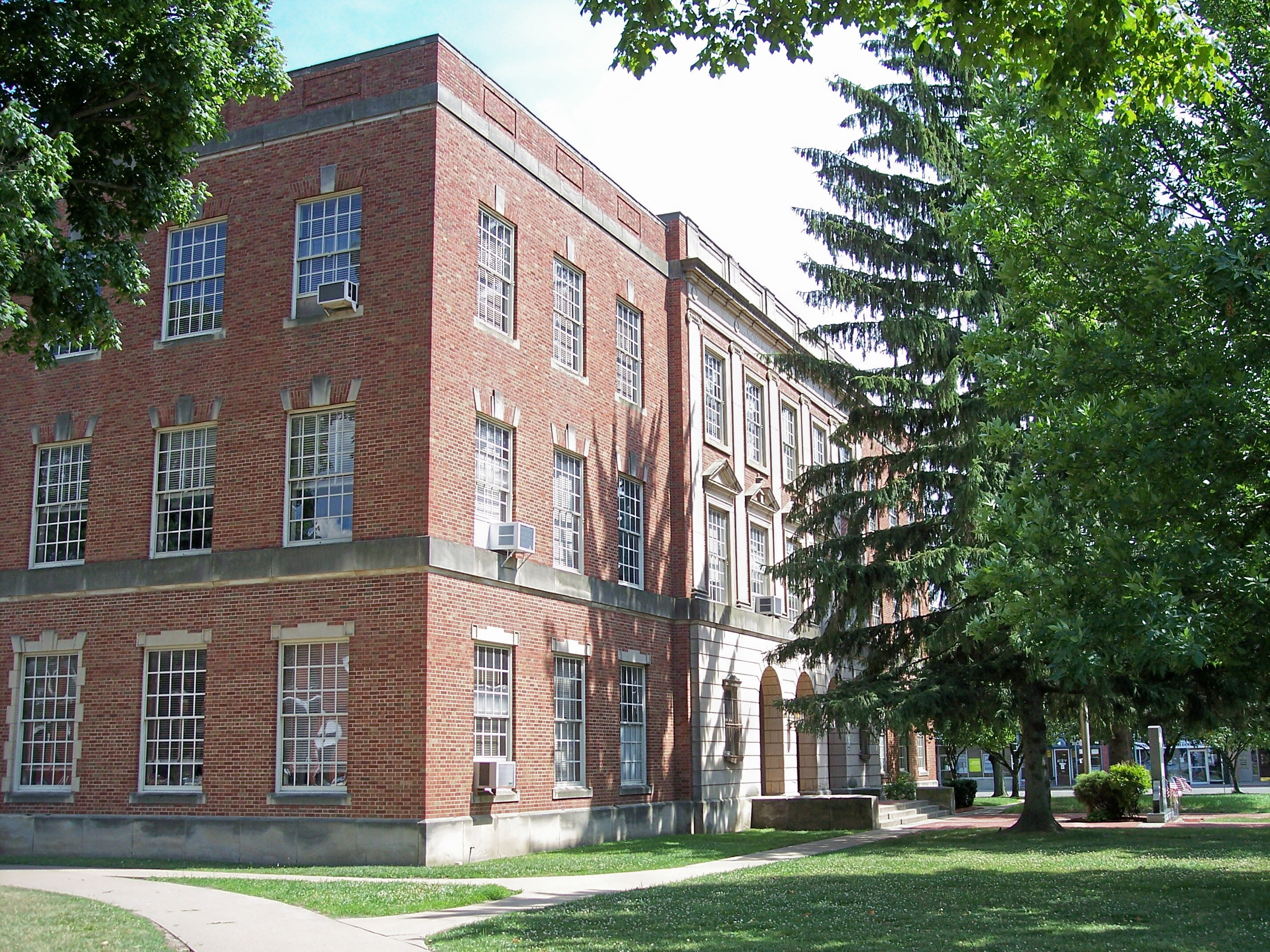
- The Courthouse in Caldwell, Ohio
- Interactive map of the The Noble County Courthouse area

General information
- Architectural style: Renaissance Revival
- Location: Caldwell, Ohio, United States
- Coordinates: 39°44′50″N 81°31′2″W
- Construction started: 1933
- Completed: 1934
- Cost: $183,000
- Client: Noble County Commissioners

Design and construction
- Architect: Charles J. Marr

The Noble County Courthouse is located in Caldwell, Ohio. The building was constructed in 1933-1934 and designed by Charles J. Marr. The building was constructed with red brick manufactured at nearby Ava, Ohio to control costs of construction. The windows are flat rectangular panels with either an arch pediment and decorative natural stone keystones or a slanted pediment. The building may be entered by a few stairs leading to a small recessed porch with archway openings. The Noble County Courthouse is currently the largest building in Caldwell.

The interior hosts four decorative murals. They depict John Gray, widely held to be the longest surviving Revolutionary War veteran; James M. Dalzell, who fought in the American Civil War; Lieutenant Commander Zachary Lansdowne, the commanding officer of the ill-fated USS Shenandoah; and the original courthouse of Noble County.

The trial of serial killer Thomas Dillon took place at the Noble County Courthouse. There, he pleaded guilty to five murders and received five consecutive 30-year sentences for aggravated murder.
