= State Library of Ohio =

State library of Ohio, United States

- Location: 35 E. Chestnut St., Columbus, Ohio, 43215, United States
- Type: State Government
- Established: 1817

Collection
- Size: 2,000,000
- Legal deposit: Regional federal depository library

Access and use
- Population served: State of Ohio

Other information
- Director: Mandy Knapp (also State Librarian of Ohio) (December 31, 2024)
- Employees: 32
- Public transit access: 4, 12; CoGo
- Website: library.ohio.gov

The State Library of Ohio is a state agency that provides services to state government and all types of libraries in Ohio. Its Columbus location is closed for transitioning after relocating. Staff are available by phone and email during regular business hours.

The State Library is governed by a five-member board. The board members are appointed by the State Board of Education and each member serves a five-year term of office. Under the Ohio Revised Code, section 3375.01, the State Library Board is responsible for the State Library of Ohio and a statewide program of development and coordination of library services.

== History ==
Governor Thomas Worthington established the State Library of Ohio in 1817 as the Ohio State Library. It was established with the purchase of 509 books. Initially it was not used by the public but by legislators. The public was able to use the library beginning in 1853. However it was not until 1896 that people were allowed to borrow materials. In June 1927, a lack of funds caused the library to close. Due to volunteer efforts it reopened a few months later but did not have state funding until the next year. In December 2000, the State Library moved from the Ohio Departments Building into the Jeffrey Mining Corporate Center, a converted factory that produced mining machinery.

On April 15, 2026, the State Library of Ohio closed to the public to prepare for relocation. Staff offices are now located at 35 E. Chestnut Street in the heart of downtown Columbus and collections were moved to a specialized archival facility with state-of-the-art environmental controls at 1831 Deffenbaugh Court in Gahanna.

== Services ==
Today the State Library of Ohio collaborates with many state agencies and Ohio libraries to provide services.

=== Services to the state government ===
- Provides access to books, print and online journals, magazines, newspapers and eBooks, and resources and materials in the State Library and OhioLINK catalogs
- Provides services to borrow materials from other libraries, delivery and pick-up of library materials to offices, meeting space with video conferencing capability, and free parking.
- Provides work-related research and reference services to state legislators and state employees.
- Provides work-related library use assistance, research help and reference services, and online topic and how-to guides.
- Partners with state agencies to help residents access their government services through public libraries.
- Provides interlibrary loan services.
- Serves as Ohio's only full regional depository for federal documents and the depository for Ohio state agency documents.

=== Services to Ohio libraries ===
- Assists in developing programs for staff and customers
- Assists in strategic planning.
- Administers the federal Library Services and Technology Act (LSTA) grant program. Under LSTA several competitive grant programs are administered including: Guiding Ohio Online, Celebrating Ohio Book Awards and Authors, and Summer Library Programs.
- Coordinates the statewide delivery network.
- Coordinates the Ohio Digital Library.
- Collects and makes available statistics about Ohio public libraries for analysis, long range planning and comparison.
- Leads collaboration and partnership with Libraries Connect Ohio—to ensure all Ohioans continue to have access to high quality, relevant, and reliable online resources and publications, at no cost to libraries, schools, universities, and residents.
- Supports the Serving Every Ohioan (SEO) Library Consortium of 104 library systems at more than 290 service points throughout 52 counties across Ohio through the SEO Library Service Center location in Caldwell.
- Collaborates with the Ohio Public Library Information Network and other training partners in providing online & face to face Internet and Library Resource training for library employees

=== Services to Ohio residents ===
- Answers reference, research, and general “How do I find” questions.
- Collaborates with the Center for Outreach Services located at the Ohio School for the Deaf to provide access to a collection of Deafness and interpreting-related materials to all Ohioans.
- Contributes funding to the Ohio Web Library—online resources and publications available to all Ohioans through public, university, special and school libraries.
- Coordinates the Ohio Talking Book program for Ohio's blind and print disabled residents including children and veterans of war.
- Manages a unique collection of library materials which may be borrowed by the public on a walk-in basis. Collections include government and business documents, and management, education, health and criminal justice books and materials.
- Provides access to current and historical state and federal government documents (print & digital), and access to borrowing eBooks, DVDs, audio books, and other materials from OhioLINK and Search Ohio member libraries.
- Provides access to subscription-based library databases
- Provides services to borrow materials from other libraries, delivery and pick-up of library materials to offices, meeting space with video conferencing capability, and free parki

== Partners ==
- ALAO
- INFOhio
- Kent State University – School of Library and Information Science
- OELMA
- Ohio Library Council
- Ohioana Library
- OhioLINK
- OHIONET
- OPLIN
- Ohio Library for the Blind and Physically Disabled
- Cleveland Public Library

== Regional library systems ==
- NEO-RLS
- NORWELD
- SERLS
- SWON Libraries

== See also ==
- List of libraries in the United States
