= Caldwell, Ohio =

- Village
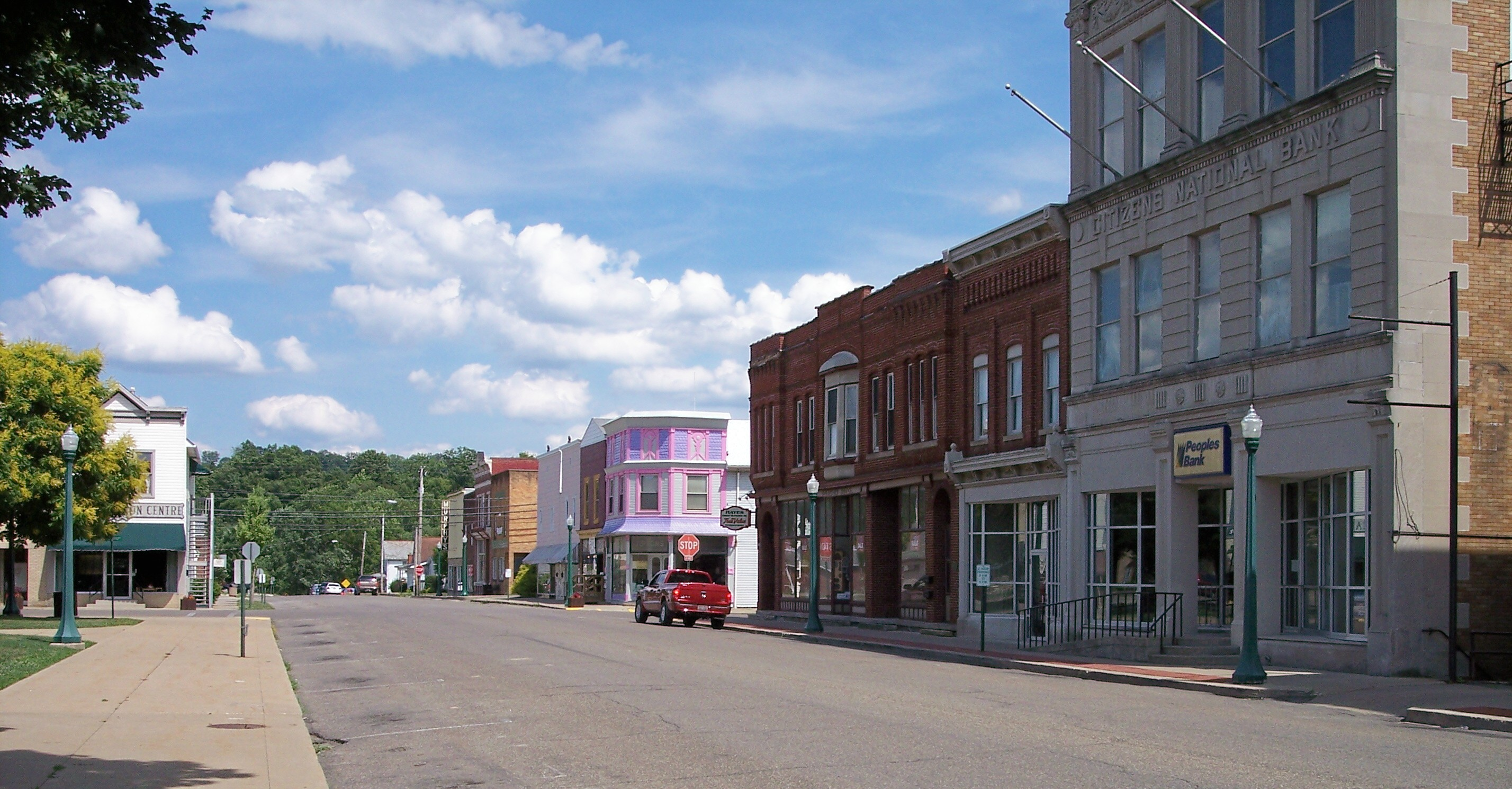
- Main Street, downtown

- Seal
- Interactive map of Caldwell, Ohio
- Location within Ohio Location within the United States
- Coordinates: 39°44′51″N 81°30′58″W
- Country: United States
- State: Ohio
- County: Noble

Government
  - Mayor: Misty Wells

Area
  - Total: 0.90 sq mi (2.34 km^{2})
  - Land: 0.89 sq mi (2.30 km^{2})
  - Water: 0.012 sq mi (0.03 km^{2})
- Elevation: 719 ft (219 m)

Population (2020)
  - Total: 1,691
  - Estimate (2023): 1,869
  - Density: 1,902.2/sq mi (734.46/km^{2})
- Time zone: UTC-5 (Eastern (EST))
  - Summer (DST): UTC-4 (EDT)
- ZIP code: 43724
- Area code: 740
- FIPS code: 39-10940
- GNIS feature ID: 2397525
- Website: caldwellohio.org

Caldwell is a village in and the county seat of Noble County, Ohio, United States. It is located along the West Fork of Duck Creek about 23 miles (37 km) north of Marietta. The population was 1,691 at the 2020 census.

== History ==
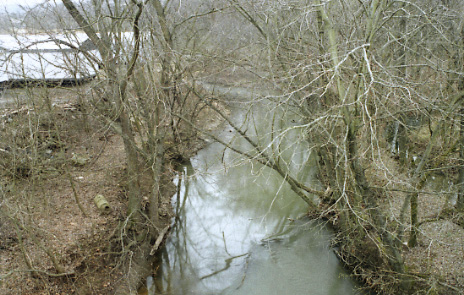
The West Fork of Duck Creek in Caldwell

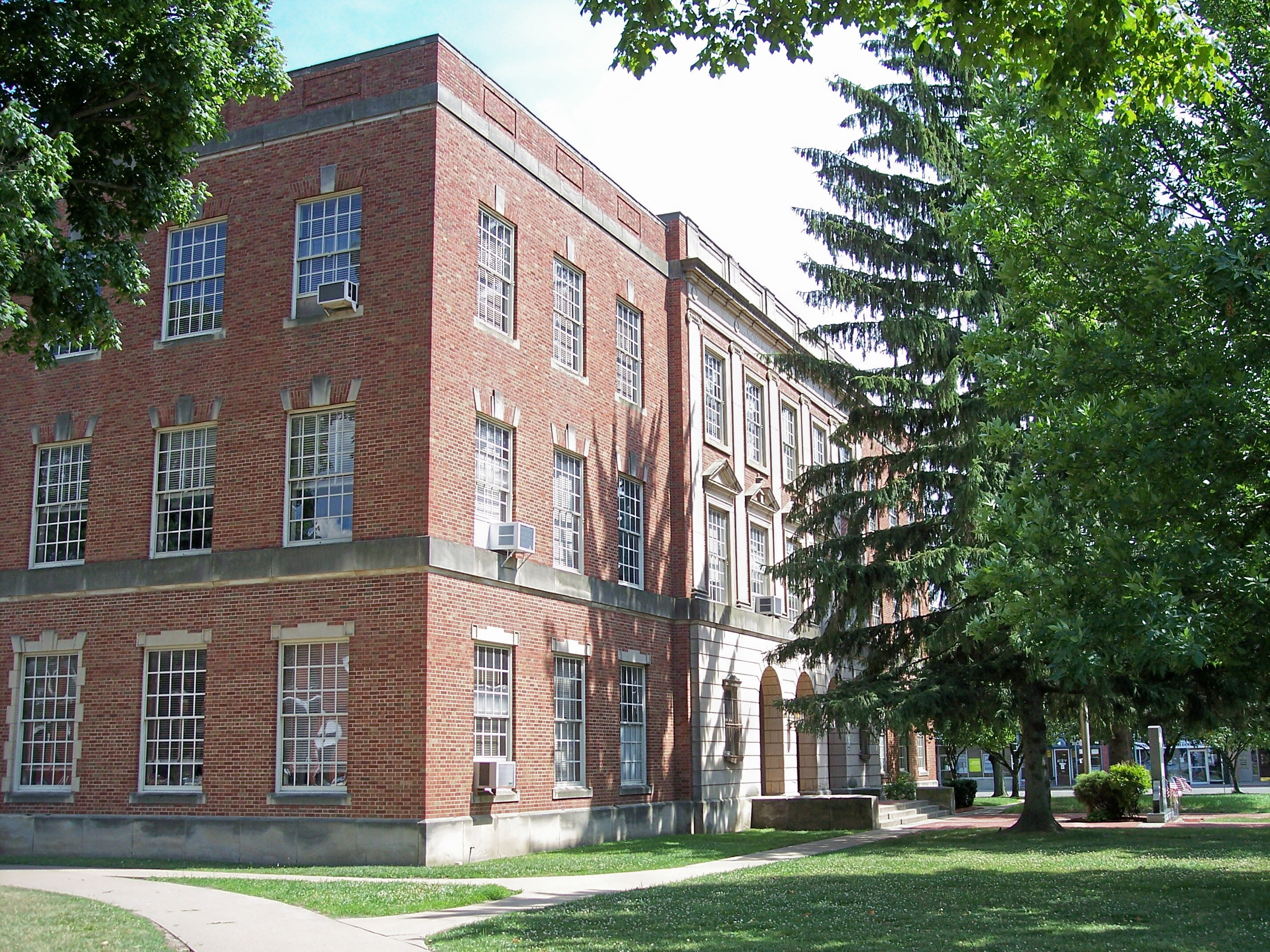
The Noble County Courthouse in Caldwell

Caldwell was founded in 1857, and named after Joseph and Samuel Caldwell, the original owners of the town site. The Pennsylvania Railroad reached Caldwell in the 1870s, tying it to markets in the east and north along the Great Lakes.

== Geography ==
According to the United States Census Bureau, the village has a total area of 0.90 square miles (2.33 km^{2}), of which 0.89 square miles (2.31 km^{2}) is land and 0.01 square miles (0.03 km^{2}) is water.

== Demographics ==
Historical population
Census	Pop.	Note	%±
1870	318		—
1880	602		89.3%
1890	1,248		107.3%
1900	927		−25.7%
1910	1,430		54.3%
1920	1,706		19.3%
1930	1,778		4.2%
1940	1,705		−4.1%
1950	1,767		3.6%
1960	1,999		13.1%
1970	2,082		4.2%
1980	1,935		−7.1%
1990	1,786		−7.7%
2000	1,956		9.5%
2010	1,748		−10.6%
2020	1,691		−3.3%
2023 (est.)	1,869	▲	10.5%
U.S. Decennial Census

=== 2010 census ===
As of the census of 2010, there were 1,748 people, 861 households, and 446 families living in the village. The population density was 1,964.0 inhabitants per square mile (758.3/km^{2}). There were 929 housing units at an average density of 1,043.8 per square mile (403.0/km^{2}). The racial makeup of the village was 97.7% White, 0.2% African American, 0.3% Native American, 0.5% Asian, 0.2% from other races, and 1.1% from two or more races. Hispanic or Latino of any race were 0.1% of the population.

There were 861 households, of which 21.7% had children under the age of 18 living with them, 37.5% were married couples living together, 10.5% had a female householder with no husband present, 3.8% had a male householder with no wife present, and 48.2% were non-families. 43.3% of all households were made up of individuals, and 23.8% had someone living alone who was 65 years of age or older. The average household size was 2.01 and the average family size was 2.76.

The median age in the village was 45.6 years. 18.9% of residents were under the age of 18; 7.5% were between the ages of 18 and 24; 23.1% were from 25 to 44; 27% were from 45 to 64; and 23.6% were 65 years of age or older. The gender makeup of the village was 45.5% male and 54.5% female.

=== 2000 census ===
As of the census of 2000, there were 1,956 people, 831 households, and 480 families living in the village. The population density was 1,956 inhabitants per square mile (755/km^{2}). There were 887 housing units at an average density of 906.1 per square mile (349.8/km^{2}). The racial makeup of the village was 99.13% White, 0.15% African American, 0.20% Native American, 0.31% Asian, and 0.20% from two or more races. Hispanic or Latino of any race were 0.10% of the population.

There were 831 households, out of which 26.0% had children under the age of 18 living with them, 45.6% were married couples living together, 9.3% had a female householder with no husband present, and 42.2% were non-families. 39.4% of all households were made up of individuals, and 23.7% had someone living alone who was 65 years of age or older. The average household size was 2.15 and the average family size was 2.86.

In the village, the population was spread out, with 20.1% under the age of 18, 8.8% from 18 to 24, 23.5% from 25 to 44, 20.8% from 45 to 64, and 26.9% who were 65 years of age or older. The median age was 43 years. For every 100 females there were 82.8 males. For every 100 females age 18 and over, there were 79.2 males.

The median income for a household in the village was $26,020, and the median income for a family was $36,094. Males had a median income of $31,250 versus $19,643 for females. The per capita income for the village was $14,942. About 9.7% of families and 14.5% of the population were below the poverty line, including 17.5% of those under age 18 and 15.2% of those age 65 or over.

== Education ==
Public schools in the village are administered by the Caldwell Exempted Village School District.

Caldwell High School's cross country team had one of the most dominant runs by any Ohio High School Athletic Association team, winning small-school state championships every year from 1985 to 1992 and the National Championship in 1986. Mah Dugan Hill, who was also on a 1973 state title team at Caldwell, was head coach of the 1987 thru 1992 teams. The Ohio Association of Track and Cross Country Coaches (OATCCC) elected him to their Hall of Fame in 1996 and awarded him the Ed Barker award in 2006. Ron Martin was the head coach of the 1985 and 1986 teams and was inducted into the OATCCC Hall of Fame in 1997. Brian Jonard, 1973 the 1976, and Tony Carna, 1983 thru 1986, are Caldwell runners who have been inducted into the Hall of Fame as well.

Caldwell has the Caldwell Public Library, the county's only public lending library.

== Notable residents ==
- Albert D. Whealdon, college professor and Wisconsin State Assemblyman, was born in Caldwell.
