= INFOhio =

INFOhio, the Information Network for Ohio schools, is the state's virtual PreK-12 library that uses the existing school telecommunications infrastructure to address equity issues by providing electronic resources, library automation, and other services to Ohio schools. These resources are linked to student achievement and performance, standards-based instruction, teacher effectiveness, and technological competency and are accessible from not only the school library, but also from classroom, lab, and home computers.

INFOhio provides the standardized library automation software to put card catalogs online, which makes it possible for students and educators to access a variety of materials, including books and other resources in the school library as well as other libraries across the state.

Since 1994, INFOhio has automated more than 2,343 school libraries serving more than 1.1 million students.
