= National Register of Historic Places listings in Noble County, Ohio =

Location of Noble County in Ohio

This is a list of the National Register of Historic Places listings in Noble County, Ohio.

This is intended to be a complete list of the properties and districts on the National Register of Historic Places in Noble County, Ohio, United States. The locations of National Register properties and districts for which the latitude and longitude coordinates are included below, may be seen in an online map.

There are 11 properties and districts listed on the National Register in the county.

This National Park Service list is complete through NPS recent listings posted March 14, 2025.

== Current listings ==
	Name on the Register	Image	Date listed	Location	City or town	Description
1	Caldwell Downtown Historic District	Caldwell Downtown Historic District	November 27, 2020 (#100005824)	Roughly bounded by Spruce, West, Plum, Bridge, and East Sts. 39°44′52″N 81°30′56″W	Caldwell	
2	Samuel Caldwell House	Samuel Caldwell House	March 11, 1980 (#80003201)	East and Locust Sts. 39°44′40″N 81°30′47″W	Caldwell	
3	Samuel Danford Farm, Church and Cemetery	Samuel Danford Farm, Church and Cemetery	March 27, 1980 (#80003204)	North of Summerfield on County Road 5-A; 39°51′31″N 81°20′56″W	Marion Township	
4	Exaltation-Elevation of the Holy Cross Church		May 4, 2022 (#100007400)	100 Walnut St. 39°47′29″N 81°33′17″W	Belle Valley	
5	Huffman Covered Bridge	Huffman Covered Bridge	March 4, 1975 (#75001513)	1.5 miles south of Middleburg off State Route 564; 39°39′37″N 81°22′13″W	Jefferson Township	Destroyed
6	Noble County Jail and Sheriff's Office	Noble County Jail and Sheriff's Office	February 20, 2004 (#04000060)	419 West St. 39°44′51″N 81°31′01″W	Caldwell	
7	St. Henry Roman Catholic Church and Rectory	St. Henry Roman Catholic Church and Rectory	December 2, 1982 (#82001485)	36573 County Road 47 at Harriettsville; 39°37′46″N 81°20′18″W	Elk Township	
8	St. Mary's Church of the Immaculate Conception	St. Mary's Church of the Immaculate Conception	July 21, 1980 (#80003202)	Off State Route 564 at Fulda; 39°43′26″N 81°24′55″W	Enoch Township	
9	SHENANDOAH Crash Sites	SHENANDOAH Crash Sites	July 25, 1989 (#89000942)	Near Interstate 77 and County Road 37 (near Ava), and State Route 78 west of Caldwell; 39°50′21″N 81°32′22″W	Buffalo, Noble, and Sharon Townships	
10	Abner Williams Log House	Abner Williams Log House	June 20, 1979 (#79001923)	Northeast of Lashley; 39°56′46″N 81°21′38″W	Wayne Township	
11	Young-Shaw House	Young-Shaw House	February 8, 1980 (#80003203)	East of Sarahsville on State Route 146; 39°48′18″N 81°26′06″W	Center Township	Torn down

== See also ==
- List of National Historic Landmarks in Ohio
- Listings in neighboring counties: Belmont, Guernsey, Monroe, Morgan, Muskingum, Washington
- National Register of Historic Places listings in Ohio
