= Dungannon (disambiguation) =

Dungannon is a town in Northern Ireland.

Dungannon may also refer to:

== Places ==
=== Canada ===
- Dungannon Township, Hastings County, Ontario - former township

=== United States ===
- Dungannon, Columbiana County, Ohio
- Dungannon, Noble County, Ohio
- Dungannon, Virginia

== Other ==
- Dungannon (horse), a thoroughbred racehorse
- Dungannon (barony), a former barony
- "Dungannon" (song), a 1980 song by the band Sector 27
