= Dungannon, Ohio =

Dungannon, Ohio may refer to:

- Dungannon, Columbiana County, Ohio
- Dungannon, Noble County, Ohio
