= Enoch Township, Ohio =

Township in Ohio, US

Enoch Township, Noble County, Ohio
- Township
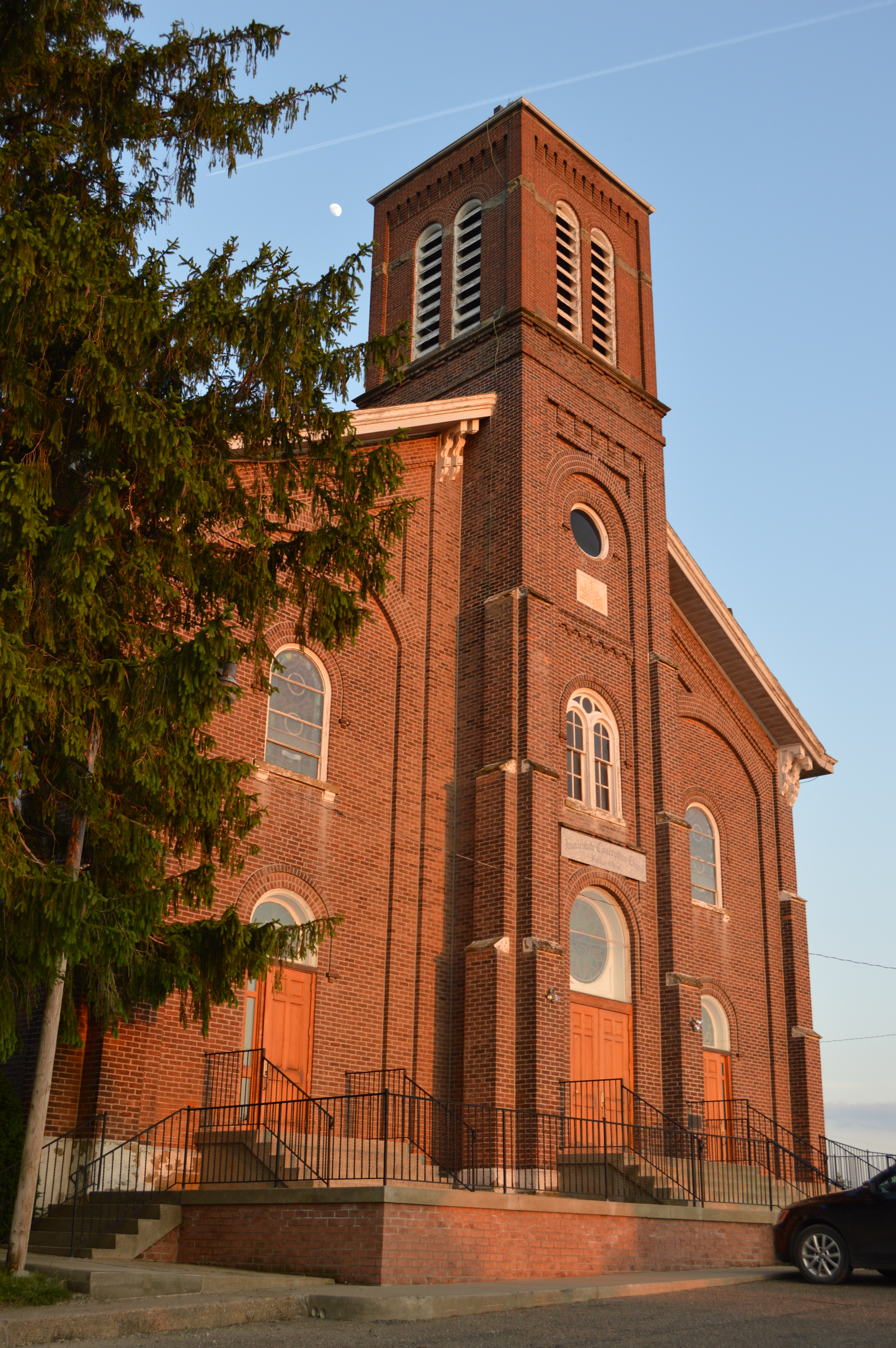
- Immaculate Conception Church at Fulda

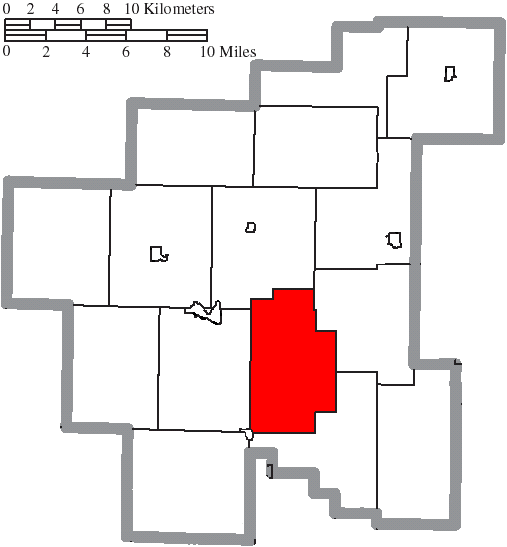
- Location of Enoch Township in Noble County
- Coordinates: 39°42′17″N 81°26′1″W
- Country: United States
- State: Ohio
- County: Noble

Area
  - Total: 26.4 sq mi (68.3 km^{2})
  - Land: 26.4 sq mi (68.3 km^{2})
  - Water: 0 sq mi (0.0 km^{2})
- Elevation: 994 ft (303 m)

Population (2020)
  - Total: 443
  - Density: 16.8/sq mi (6.49/km^{2})
- Time zone: UTC-5 (Eastern (EST))
  - Summer (DST): UTC-4 (EDT)
- FIPS code: 39-25438
- GNIS feature ID: 1086744

Enoch Township is one of the fifteen townships of Noble County, Ohio, United States. The 2020 census found 443 people in the township.

== Geography ==
Located in the south central part of the county, it borders the following townships:

- Center Township - north
- Stock Township - northeast
- Jefferson Township - southeast
- Jackson Township - southwest corner
- Olive Township - west

A tiny portion of the small village of Dexter City is located in far southwestern Enoch Township.

== Name and history ==
Enoch Township has the name of Elisha Enochs, an early settler and local officeholder. It is the only Enoch Township statewide.

== Government ==
The township is governed by a three-member board of trustees, who are elected in November of odd-numbered years to a four-year term beginning on the following January 1. Two are elected in the year after the presidential election and one is elected in the year before it. There is also an elected township fiscal officer, who serves a four-year term beginning on April 1 of the year after the election, which is held in November of the year before the presidential election. Vacancies in the fiscal officership or on the board of trustees are filled by the remaining trustees.
