= Moundville =

Moundville is the name of several places in the United States:

- Moundville, Alabama
- Moundville Archaeological Site, a prehistoric chiefdom center near Tuscaloosa, Alabama
- Moundville, Missouri
- Moundville, Wisconsin

== See also ==
- Moundsville, Ohio
- Moundsville, West Virginia
