= St. Henry's Church =

St. Henry's Church may refer to:

- St. Henry's Church (Bayonne, New Jersey)
- St. Henry's Catholic Church (St. Henry, Ohio)
- St. Henry's Catholic Church (Harriettsville, Ohio)
- St. Henry's Catholic Church (Helsinki)
- St. Henry's Church (Velkua)
- Turku Cathedral
