= Young-Shaw House =

Historic house in Ohio, United States

- U.S. National Register of Historic Places
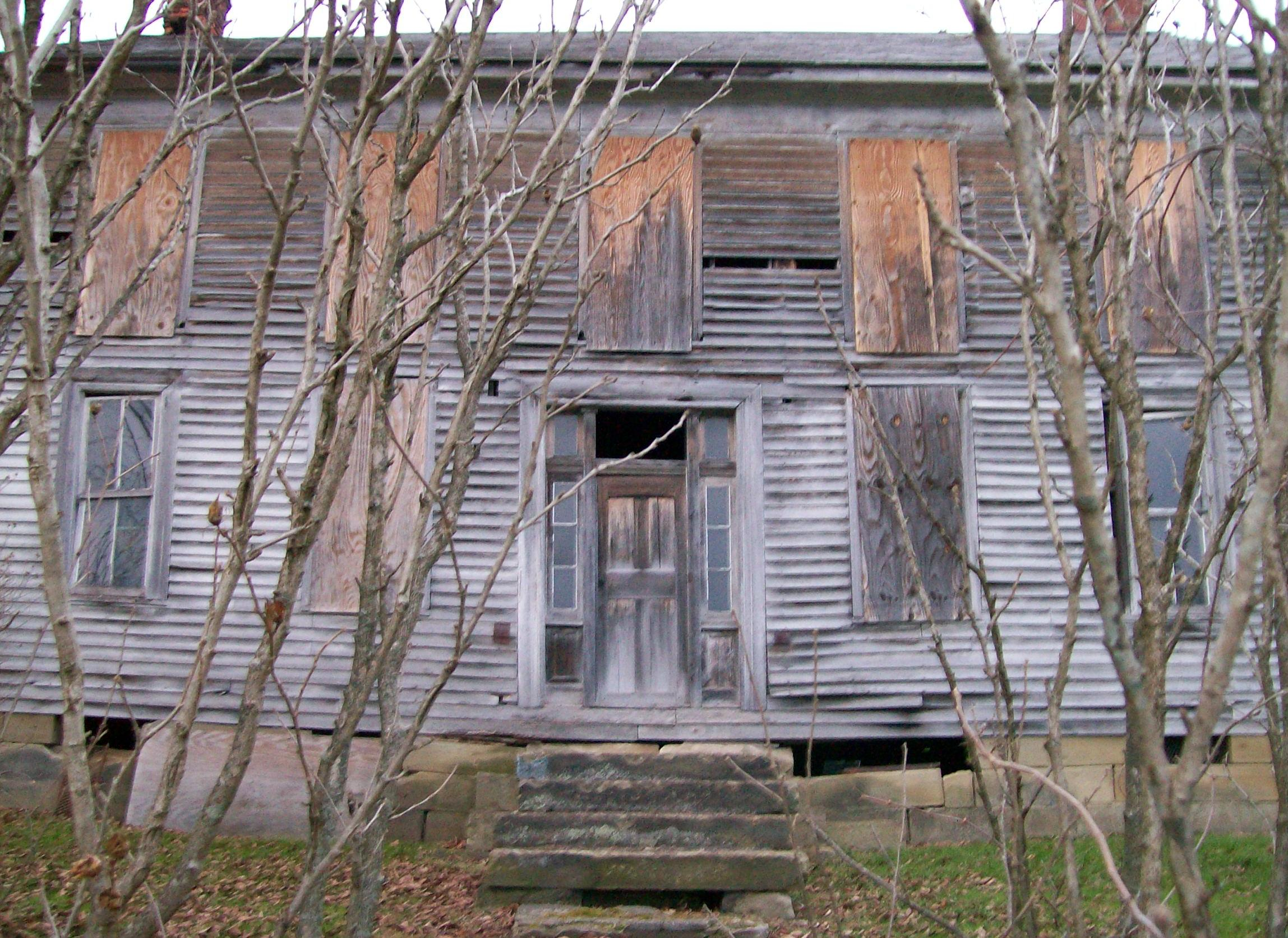
- Front of the house

- Location within Ohio Location within the United States
- Location: State Route 146, east of Sarahsville, Ohio
- Coordinates: 39°48′18″N 81°26′6″W
- Area: 30 acres (12 ha)
- Built: 1870
- Architect: Tobias Shaw
- NRHP reference No.: 80003203
- Added to NRHP: February 8, 1980

The Young-Shaw House was a historic farmhouse located near Sarahsville, Ohio, United States. A simple building originally home to a wealthy farmer, it was passed down through numerous generations of the original owner's family, and it has been named a historic site.

Born at Lippitt, Rhode Island in 1819, Henry J. Young came to present-day Noble County with his family in 1825. Although the land was then in a wild state, he carefully acquired enough money to buy 40 acres (16 ha) of land and marry a woman from Pennsylvania, and he moved to the site of the present house in Center Township in 1846. Center Township farmers had been growing tobacco since circa 1835, and war conditions only heightened demand for the township's leaf. Tobacco commerce was centered in the community of Sarahsville, which remained active in the trade into the late 1880s. In such a context Young began growing and dealing in tobacco, and by the 1880s, he had made himself one of the county's wealthiest men. In addition to his commercial activities, he was a community pioneer; he was among the founders of the Fredericksdale United Brethren Church, although for much of his life he was a member of and a lay preacher in the Methodist Episcopal Church.

After nearly a quarter of a century in their original farmhouse, Young and his wife arranged for the present house to be erected in 1870, hiring contractor Tobias Shaw of Senecaville to oversee construction; Shaw's son ultimately married Young's daughter, and the property has remained in Shaw ownership through several generations of the family. Two and a half stories tall, the house is a wooden balloon framed building covered with weatherboarding. The front is divided into five bays with a doorway in the center of the first story, while the largely windowless ends rise to gables. Chimneys pierce the slate roof at either end of the roofline, and the entire structure rests on a stone foundation.

In 1980, the Young-Shaw House was listed on the National Register of Historic Places; it qualified because of its connection to Henry Young and his prominent place in the history of the area. Five agricultural outbuildings were included in the historic designation, which is one of nine such locations in Noble County.

The house was torn down in 2016 by the family. It was too expensive to maintain and posed a danger to the public. The usable wood from the house was reclaimed and donated.
