= Olive Township, Ohio =

Olive Township, Ohio may refer to:

- Olive Township, Meigs County, Ohio
- Olive Township, Noble County, Ohio
