= St. Henry's Catholic Church (Harriettsville, Ohio) =

- St. Henry Roman Catholic Church and Rectory
- U.S. National Register of Historic Places
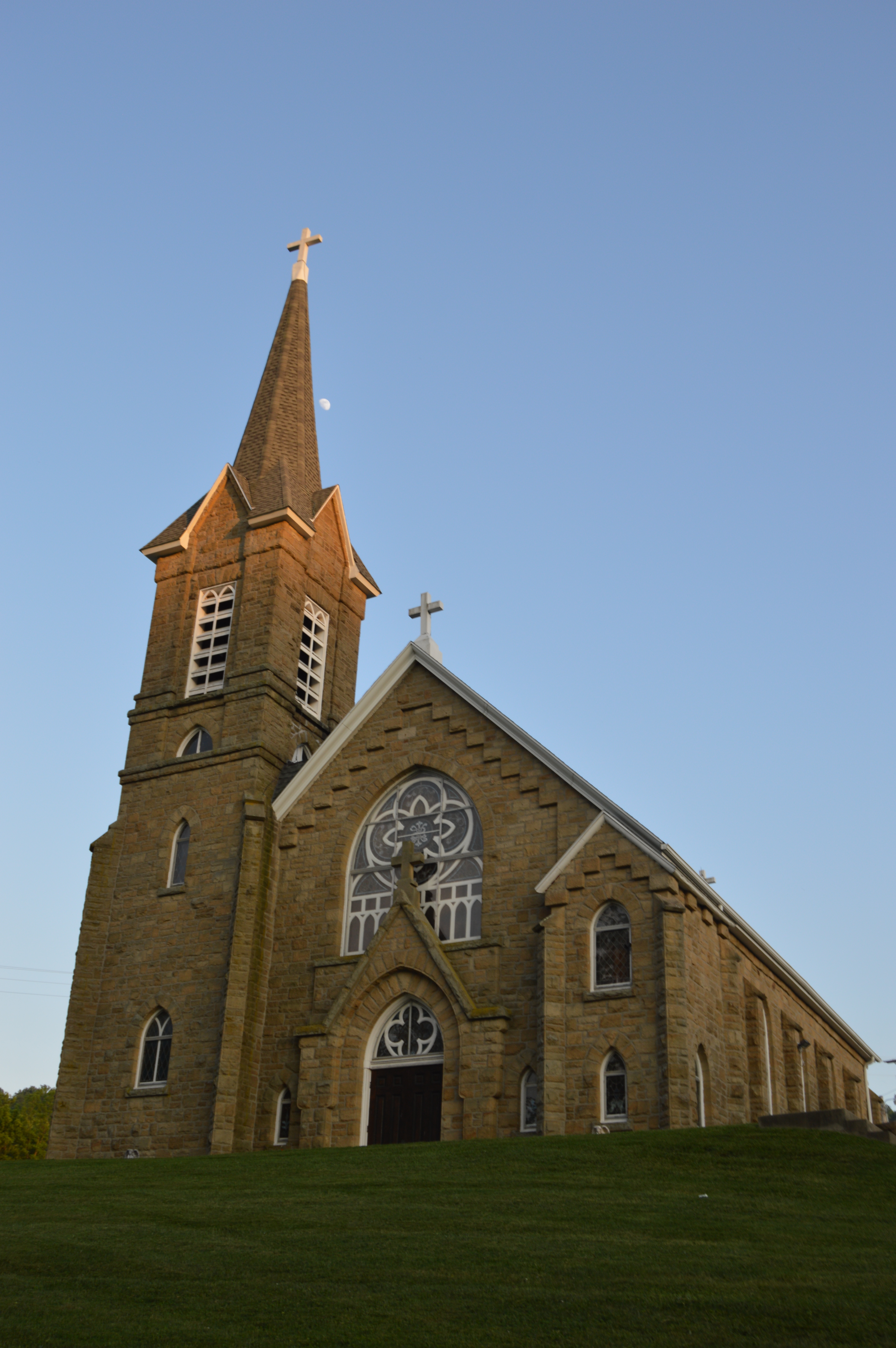
- Front and western side

- Location within Ohio Location within the United States
- Location: 36573 County Road 47, Harriettsville, Ohio
- Coordinates: 39°37′46″N 81°20′18″W
- Area: 1 acre (0.40 ha)
- Built: 1894
- Architect: Adolphus Druiding
- Architectural style: Gothic Revival
- NRHP reference No.: 82001485
- Added to NRHP: December 2, 1982

St. Henry's Catholic Church is a historic Catholic parish in the rural community of Harriettsville in the southeastern part of the U.S. state of Ohio. Established for German settlers in the 1860s, it worships in a landmark church building constructed in the 1890s. As the only stone building in the area and the work of a prominent architect, it has been named a historic site.

== History ==
Noble County's pioneer settlers arrived soon after the Treaty of Greenville, 1795; although the area is near the earliest settlement at Marietta, the northward advance of civilization was delayed by events such as the Big Bottom massacre, 1790, on the Muskingum River not far to the west. However, the history of Harriettsville began far later, for Moses T. Spencer platted it in 1839. Among the earliest settlers were a pair of Frenchmen, while numerous Germans were among the small village's population by the late 1880s.

The first clergy in modern-day Noble County were itinerant ministers of the Methodist Episcopal Church; preachers from other denominations were equally as active as the Methodists, but less numerous. Harriettsville's first church, predating the community itself, was a small group of Methodists formed in 1832. In contrast, St. Henry's Church was organized only in 1868, but a small frame building was completed in the same year, while the earliest Methodist church building was erected in 1869. This pioneer building measured 25 by 40 feet (7.6 m × 12.2 m) and cost $1,800; it was built largely by the donation of one man, William Smithberger. No longer did the village's Catholics need to await occasional visits from the priest at Immaculate Conception Church in Fulda in order to hear Mass. Virtually all of the members in the early decades were Germans or of German descent. A parish school was formed in the late 1870s, and in its first twenty years, the parish grew fourfold in membership. This growth caused the original church building to be too small: land for a new building was purchased in 1879, and construction finished in 1894.

== Architecture ==
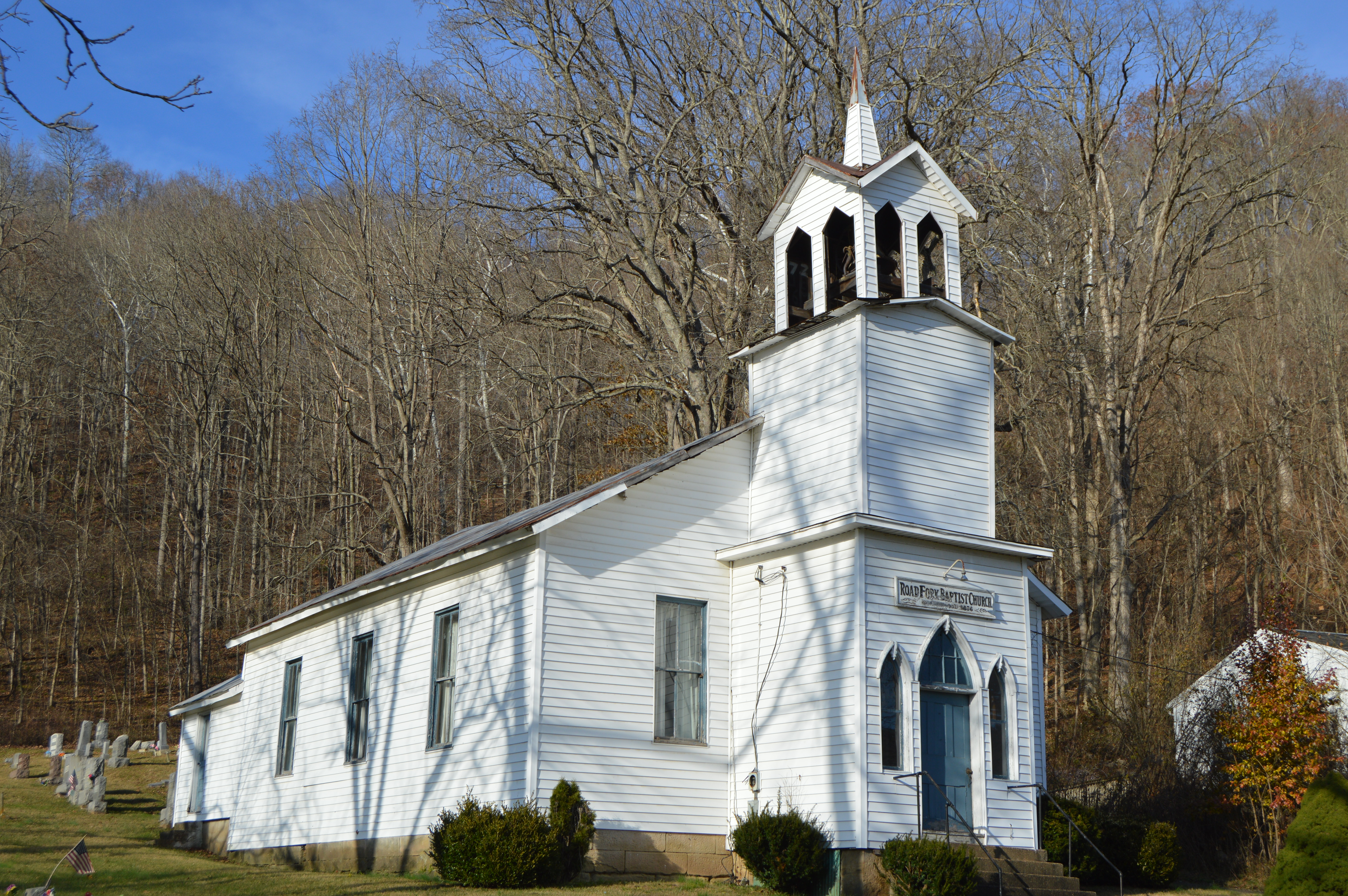
Baptist church at nearby Road Fork, a typical local church

St. Henry's Church is a stone building in the Gothic Revival style; the most prominent component is a multi-story tower on one side of the facade. Small windows pierce the walls of the tower, the main section of which is topped by a louvered belfry. Crowning the entire tower is a tall spire topped with a cross, while space for large clocks is left unoccupied between the spire and the belfry. The primary portion of the church is a simpler rectangular structure; the shingled roof rises to a prominent gable at the front of the building. Sitting next to the church is a small frame rectory with gabled roof, built in the late nineteenth century.

Rather than hiring a local architect, the parishioners chose Chicago architect Adolphus Druiding to design their new church at the end of the nineteenth century. One of Ohio's most rural areas, Noble County possesses a built environment consisting primarily of traditional vernacular buildings, rather than the high style and professional craftsmanship that the church exemplifies. Moreover, very few stone buildings are found anywhere in the county, and Harriettsville has no other stone buildings at all.

== Historic site ==
External image
- View from the north

In 1982, the church and rectory were listed together on the National Register of Historic Places, qualifying both because of their historically significant architecture and because of their important place in the area's history. The property is one of nine Noble County locations on the National Register; among the others is Immaculate Conception Church in Fulda, which supported Harriettsville's Catholics before St. Henry parish was formed.
