= Olive Green, Ohio =

Olive Green, Ohio may refer to:

- Olive Green, Delaware County, Ohio
- Olive Green, Noble County, Ohio
