= New Years Creek =

River in Ohio, United States

Coordinates: 39°30′10″N 81°25′24″W

New Years Creek is a stream in the U.S. state of Ohio. It is a tributary to Duck Creek.

Variant names are "New Year's Run" and "New Years Run". According to tradition, New Years Creek was named by a pioneer family on January 1, 1795, who celebrated the New Year's holiday by eating their dinner by the creek's mouth.
