= Wolf Run State Park =

Park in Ohio, USA

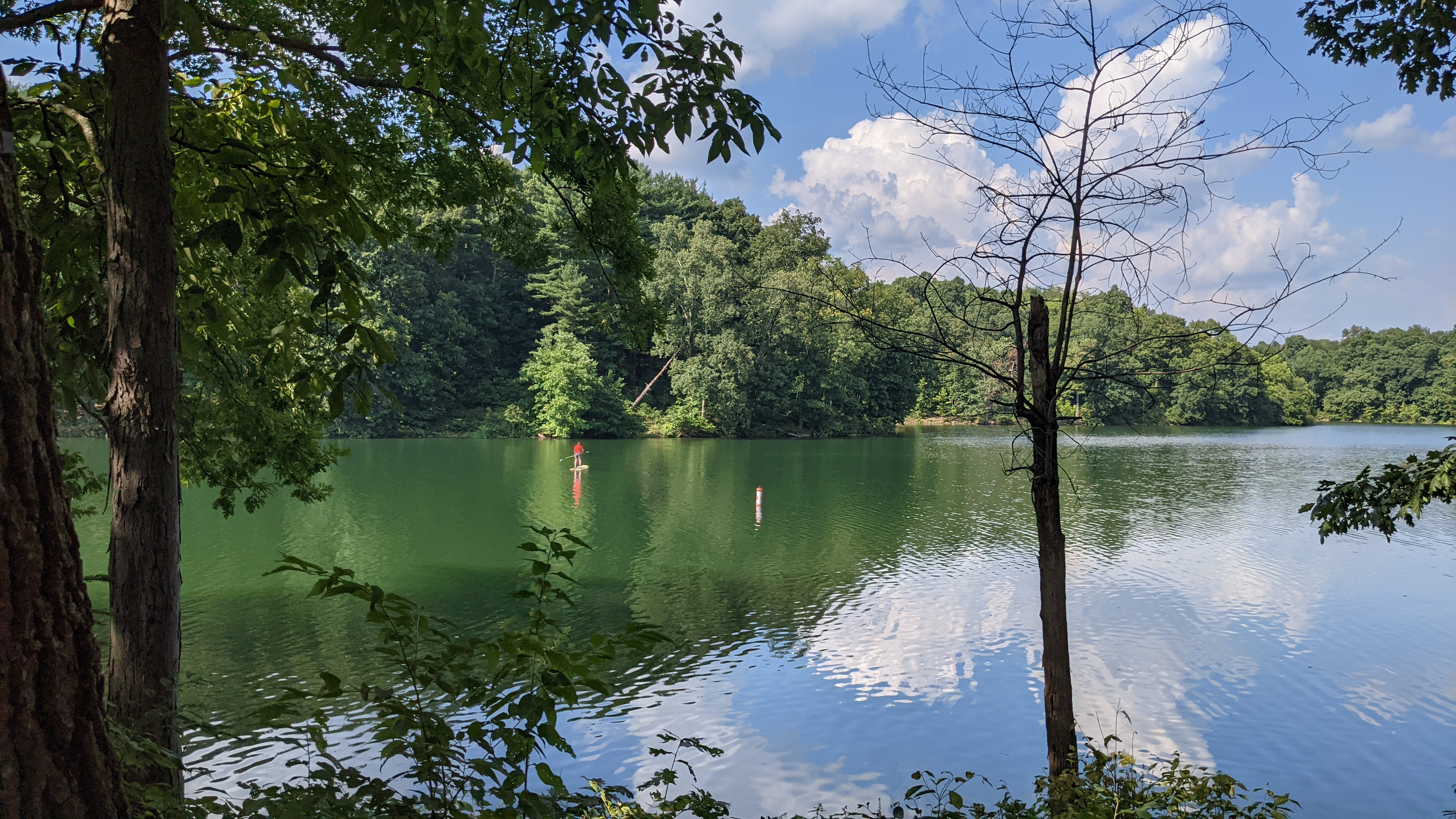

- Location within Ohio Location within the United States
- Location: Noble County, Ohio, United States
- Nearest town: Caldwell, Ohio
- Coordinates: 39°47′33″N 81°32′20″W
- Area: Land: 1,338 acres (541 ha); Water: 220 acres (89 ha)
- Elevation: 856 feet (261 m)
- Established: Acquisition: 1963; Dedication: 1968
- Administrator: Ohio Department of Natural Resources
- Designation: Ohio state park
- Website: Wolf Run State Park

Wolf Run State Park is a 1,338-acre (541 ha) public recreation area located three miles north of the village of Caldwell, Ohio, in the United States. The state park features hiking on trails that include a section of the Buckeye Trail plus swimming, boating and fishing on 220-acre (89 ha) Wolf Run Lake. The Noble County Airport is located nearby.
