= Steamtown =

Steamtown may refer to:

- Steamtown, Ohio, a community in the United States
- Steamtown Heritage Rail Centre, museum in Peterborough, South Australia
- Steamtown Peterborough Railway Preservation Society, former heritage railway in Peterborough, South Australia
- Steamtown, USA, former Vermont museum
- Steamtown National Historic Site, Scranton, Pennsylvania, USA
- Carnforth MPD, former museum in England also known as Steamtown
- The Marketplace at Steamtown, a mixed-use center in Scranton, Pennsylvania, United States (previously branded as the Mall at Steamtown)

== See also ==
- West Coast Railways, English railway operator in Lancashire on the site of the old Steamtown heritage depot
