= Belle Valley, Ohio =

- Village
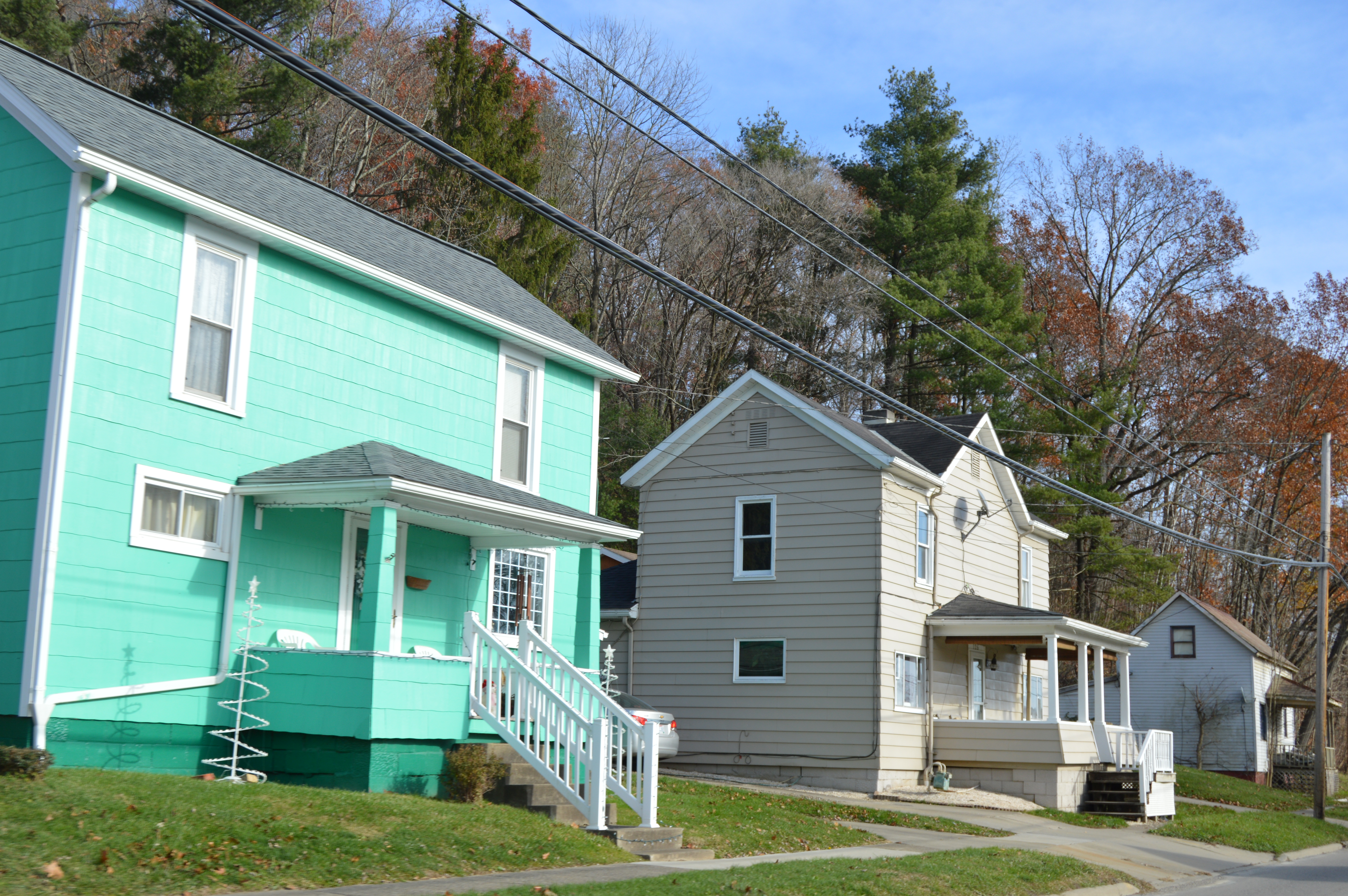
- Main Street

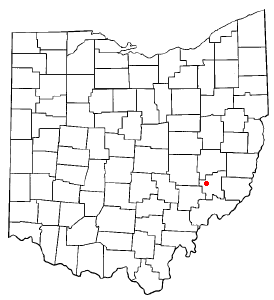
- Location of Belle Valley, Ohio

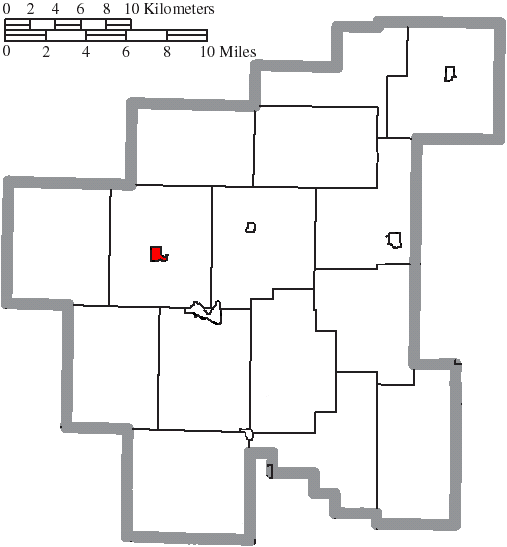
- Location of Belle Valley in Noble County
- Coordinates: 39°47′20″N 81°33′24″W
- Country: United States
- State: Ohio
- County: Noble

Area
  - Total: 0.41 sq mi (1.05 km^{2})
  - Land: 0.41 sq mi (1.05 km^{2})
  - Water: 0 sq mi (0.00 km^{2})
- Elevation: 742 ft (226 m)

Population (2020)
  - Total: 201
  - Estimate (2023): 199
  - Density: 494.3/sq mi (190.84/km^{2})
- Time zone: UTC-5 (Eastern (EST))
  - Summer (DST): UTC-4 (EDT)
- ZIP code: 43717
- Area code: 740
- FIPS code: 39-05158
- GNIS feature ID: 2398077

Belle Valley is a village in Noble County, Ohio, United States. The population was 201 at the 2020 census.

== History ==
Belle Valley had its start when the Cleveland and Marietta Railroad was extended to that point. The Village of Belle Valley was incorporated in 1905.

On May 18, 1913, fifteen coal miners were killed in a mine explosion. The population of Belle Valley was about 1000 at the time.

During World War II, Belle Valley soldier Harry Torhan, who was born to Russian emigre coal mining parents, received the Silver Star and Purple Heart for evacuating four wounded soldiers while under mortar and small arms fire during the Battle of the Bulge.

== Geography ==
Belle Valley is located along the West Fork of Duck Creek in Noble Township. Belle Valley is located within a short driving distance of Cambridge, Marietta, and Zanesville, near Interstate 77.

According to the United States Census Bureau, the village has a total area of 0.41 square miles (1.06 km^{2}), all land.

The Village of Belle Valley is also part of the Ohio Buckeye Trail, a hiking trail that circles the entire state of Ohio. The Belle Valley section is a mostly hilly, completely rural portion of the Buckeye Trail that runs through Guernsey and Noble Counties in southeast Ohio. The section runs from Winterset to the America Electric Power Recreation Lands. The trail here is mostly on rarely traveled dirt roads, with off-road portions located at Salt Fork Wildlife Area, Seneca Lake (the southernmost of the Muskingum Watershed Conservancy District Lakes), Wolf Run State Park and America Electric Power Recreation Lands. The trail passes through the villages of Old Washington, where the trail crosses I-70, and Belle Valley, where it crosses I-77, and Hoskinsville.

== Demographics ==
Historical population
Census	Pop.	Note	%±
1910	689		—
1920	1,050		52.4%
1930	603		−42.6%
1940	617		2.3%
1950	458		−25.8%
1960	438		−4.4%
1970	393		−10.3%
1980	329		−16.3%
1990	267		−18.8%
2000	263		−1.5%
2010	223		−15.2%
2020	201		−9.9%
2023 (est.)	199	▼	−1.0%
U.S. Decennial Census

=== 2010 census ===
As of the census of 2010, there were 223 people, 93 households, and 64 families living in the village. The population density was 543.9 inhabitants per square mile (210.0/km^{2}). There were 110 housing units at an average density of 268.3 per square mile (103.6/km^{2}). The racial makeup of the village was 97.3% White, 0.9% from other races, and 1.8% from two or more races. Hispanic or Latino of any race were 0.4% of the population.

There were 93 households, of which 30.1% had children under the age of 18 living with them, 45.2% were married couples living together, 11.8% had a female householder with no husband present, 11.8% had a male householder with no wife present, and 31.2% were non-families. 25.8% of all households were made up of individuals, and 11.8% had someone living alone who was 65 years of age or older. The average household size was 2.40 and the average family size was 2.86.

The median age in the village was 40.6 years. 23.3% of residents were under the age of 18; 7.3% were between the ages of 18 and 24; 23.8% were from 25 to 44; 26.9% were from 45 to 64; and 18.8% were 65 years of age or older. The gender makeup of the village was 50.7% male and 49.3% female.

=== 2000 census ===
As of the census of 2000, there were 263 people, 104 households, and 71 families living in the village. The population density was 632.6 inhabitants per square mile (244.2/km^{2}). There were 117 housing units at an average density of 281.4 per square mile (108.6/km^{2}). The racial makeup of the village was 97.34% White, 0.76% African American, 0.76% Native American, and 1.14% from two or more races. Hispanic or Latino of any race were 0.76% of the population.

There were 104 households, out of which 30.8% had children under the age of 18 living with them, 51.9% were married couples living together, 9.6% had a female householder with no husband present, and 30.8% were non-families. 27.9% of all households were made up of individuals, and 18.3% had someone living alone who was 65 years of age or older. The average household size was 2.53 and the average family size was 3.08.

In the village, the population was spread out, with 25.5% under the age of 18, 6.5% from 18 to 24, 28.5% from 25 to 44, 24.3% from 45 to 64, and 15.2% who were 65 years of age or older. The median age was 39 years. For every 100 females there were 90.6 males. For every 100 females age 18 and over, there were 84.9 males.

The median income for a household in the village was $30,536, and the median income for a family was $34,375. Males had a median income of $26,000 versus $18,125 for females. The per capita income for the village was $13,659. About 11.0% of families and 19.9% of the population were below the poverty line, including 22.6% of those under the age of eighteen and 33.3% of those 65 or over.
