= Abner Williams Log House =

Historic house in Ohio, United States

- U.S. National Register of Historic Places
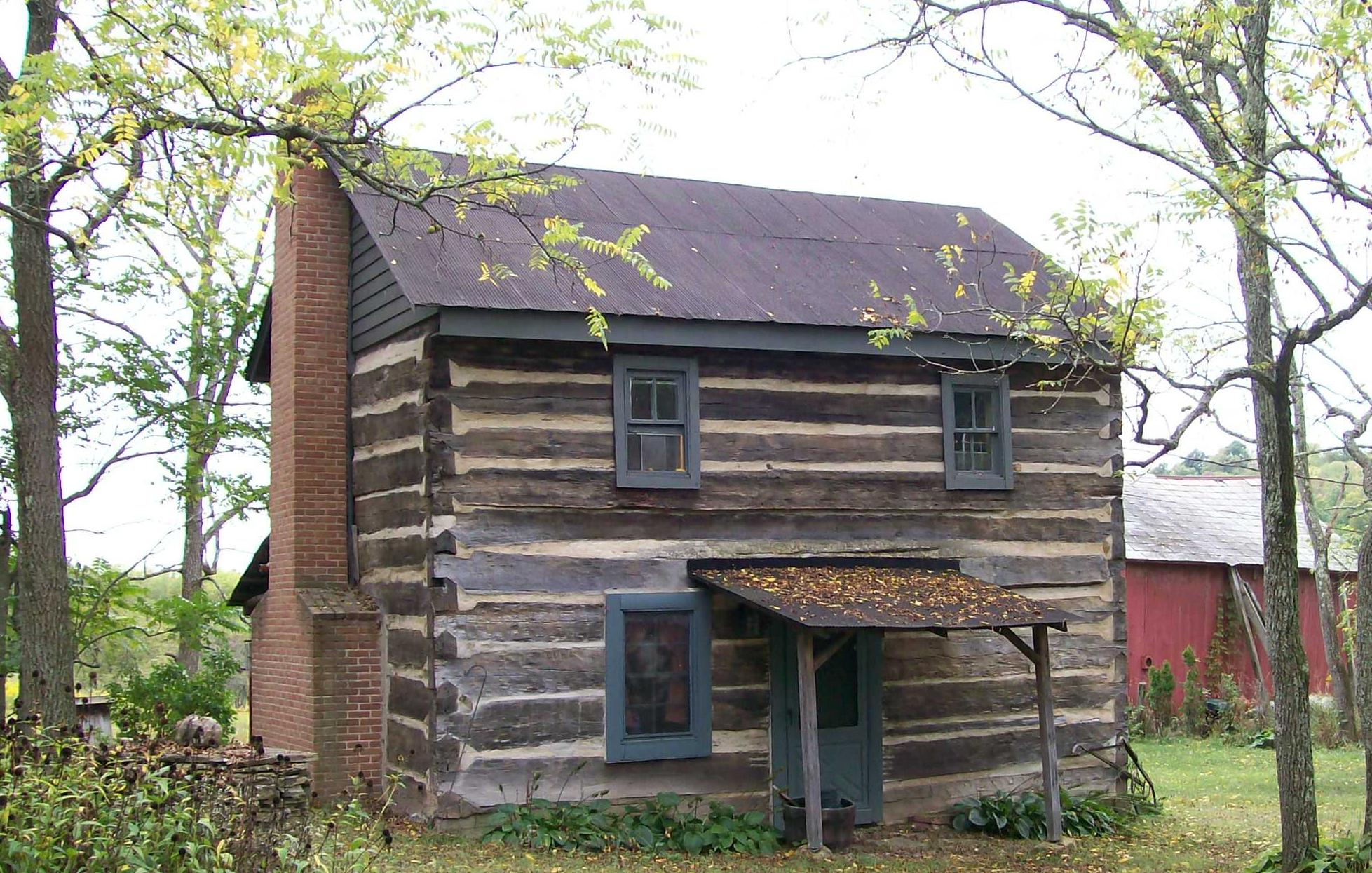
- Front of the house

- Location within Ohio Location within the United States
- Nearest city: Lashley, Ohio
- Coordinates: 39°56′46″N 81°21′38″W
- Area: 3 acres (1.2 ha)
- Built: 1827
- Architect: Abner Williams
- NRHP reference No.: 79001923
- Added to NRHP: June 20, 1979

The Abner Williams Log House is a historic log cabin in the southeastern part of the U.S. state of Ohio. Located northeast of Lashley in Noble County, it was the home of one of the leading citizens of early Noble County.

Born in 1798, Abner Williams was the grandson of early Guernsey County settler Joseph Williams. In 1827, at the age of 29, Abner purchased land in a valley near the present-day Quaker City; here he settled and built his log house, which was completed by the end of the year. Williams was a successful farmer; his original property was 82 acres (33 ha), but by the end of his life, he had added another 210 acres (85 ha) to it. Noble County was formed in 1851, being the last of Ohio's counties to be created. County voters chose two justices of the peace in that year, and Abner Williams was one of the men elected.

Built of logs on a stone foundation, the Williams House is covered with a metal roof and some elements of weatherboarding. It has been recognized as a typical example of log house construction styles common in eastern Ohio during the second quarter of the nineteenth century. In 1979, the Abner Williams Log House was listed on the National Register of Historic Places, qualifying both because of its historically significant architecture and because of place as the home of a leading local citizen. Expanding its importance is the state of the surrounding countryside: surface mining for coal has unintentionally damaged much of the historic nature of the rural region, increasing the historic importance of surviving properties such as the Williams House.
