= Dudley, Ohio =

Unincorporated community in Ohio, U.S.

Coordinates: 39°42′02″N 81°30′31″W

Dudley is an unincorporated community in Noble County, in the U.S. state of Ohio.

== History ==
Dudley had its start in 1871 when the railroad was extended to that point. A post office was established at Dudley in 1872, and remained in operation until 1953. The town site was officially platted in 1877. Dudley was the name of a family of early settlers in the area.
