= Moundsville, Ohio =

Unincorporated community in Ohio, U.S.

Coordinates: 39°40′00″N 81°28′56″W

Moundsville is an unincorporated community in Noble County, in the U.S. state of Ohio.

== History ==
Moundsville was platted in 1861. With the construction of the railroad, business activity shifted to nearby South Olive.
