= Keith, Ohio =

Unincorporated community in Ohio, U.S.

Coordinates: 39°39′24″N 81°33′46″W

Keith (also known as Keiths and Keiths Mills) is an unincorporated community in Noble County, in the U.S. state of Ohio.

== History ==
Keith had its start around 1835 when Peter Keith and his partner opened a store. Peter Keith later also built a sawmill and gristmill in the town which bears his name. A post office was established at Keith in 1837, and remained in operation until 1904.
