= Elk, Ohio =

Unincorporated community in Ohio, U.S.

Coordinates: 39°40′23″N 81°20′09″W

Elk is an unincorporated community in Noble County, in the U.S. state of Ohio.

== History ==
Elk was originally called Fredericktown, and under the latter name was laid out in 1854. A post office later was established at Fredericktown under the name Elk. The Elk post office opened in 1873, and remained in operation until 1910.
