= Immaculate Conception Catholic Church (Fulda, Ohio) =

- St. Mary's Church of the Immaculate Conception
- U.S. National Register of Historic Places
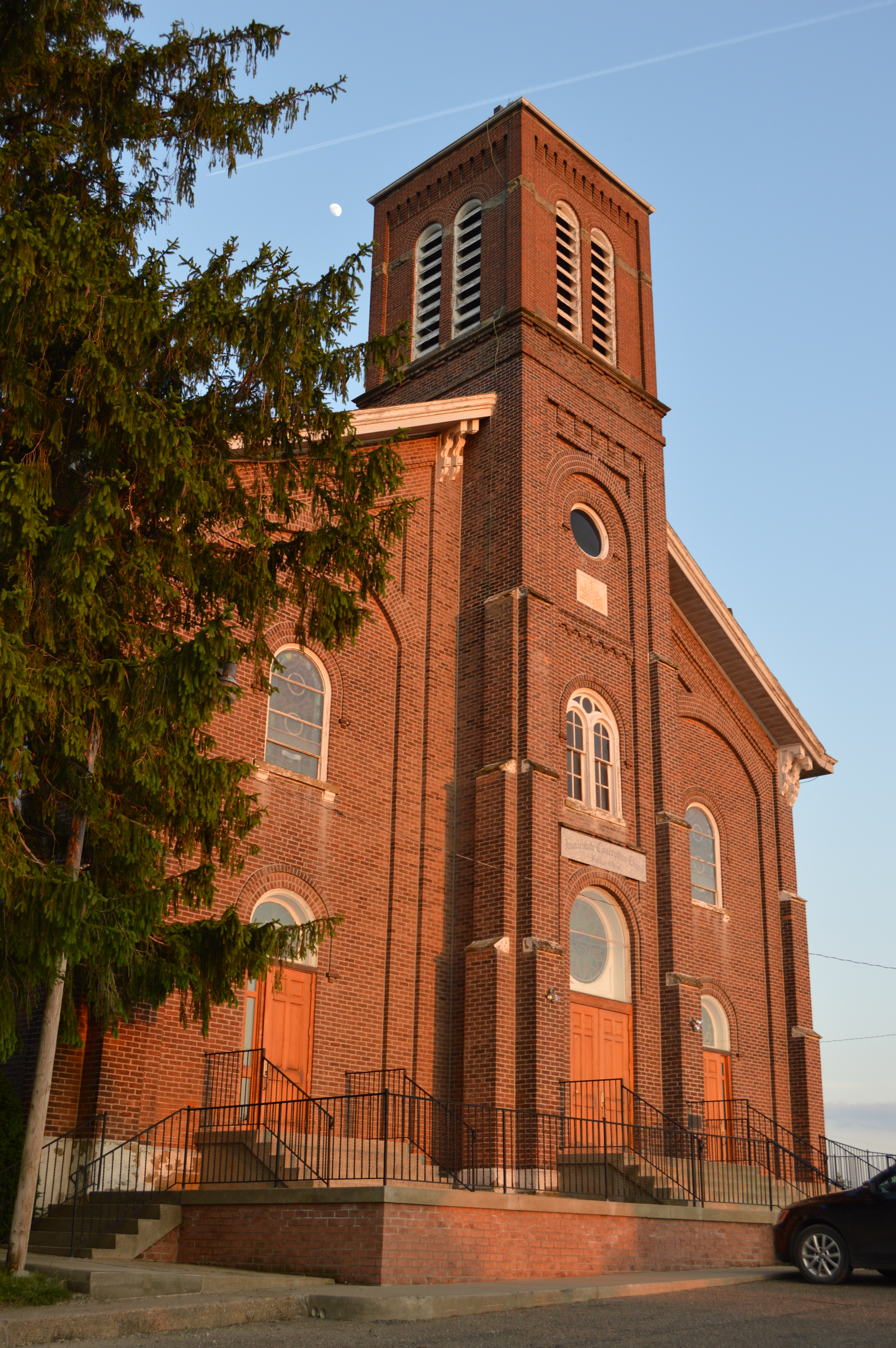
- Front of the church

- Location within Ohio Location within the United States
- Interactive map showing the location of Immaculate Conception Church
- Location: Off State Route 564 in Fulda, Ohio
- Coordinates: 39°43′26″N 81°24′56″W
- Area: Less than 1 acre (0.40 ha)
- Built: 1874
- Architectural style: Romanesque Revival
- NRHP reference No.: 80003202
- Added to NRHP: July 21, 1980

Immaculate Conception Catholic Church is a historic Catholic parish at Fulda in rural Noble County, Ohio, United States. Established in the 1840s among a group of German immigrants, it worships in a landmark building that dominates the surrounding community. The building has been named a historic site.

== History ==
Noble County's pioneer settlers arrived soon after the Treaty of Greenville, 1795; although the area is near the earliest settlement at Marietta, the northward advance of civilization was delayed by events such as the Big Bottom massacre, 1790, on the Muskingum River not far to the west. However, the history of Fulda began far later, for Charles Burlingame platted it in 1861. By the late 1880s, numerous Germans were among the small village's population.

The first clergy in modern-day Noble County were itinerant ministers of the Methodist Episcopal Church; preachers from other denominations were equally as active as the Methodists, but less numerous. Harriettsville's first church, predating the community itself, was a small group of Methodists. Immaculate Conception Church was organized about 1840, seven years after the first Germans arrived in the area after migrating from Wheeling, Virginia. No priest came among them until 1840, and until 1849 the ministration of the sacraments was rare. A priest from Miltonsburg began making twice-monthly visits in 1849, but the first resident priest was appointed in 1858. Although he stayed only two years, his successor D.J. Kluber served the parish from 1860 until 1883, exerting immense influence over the parish, and the members saw him as being largely responsible for the parish's growth and stability. Construction began on a small church building under the ministry of the priest from Miltonsburg, and Archbishop Purcell of Cincinnati dedicated it in 1853. Ten years later, the parishioners constructed a parish school, and a rectory followed in 1866; its large size and pretentious architecture resulted in a high construction cost of $2,500. By this time, the original church building had become entirely inadequate for the needs of the congregation, and replacement plans were laid; the cornerstone was laid in May 1874, and Bishop Rosecrans of Columbus dedicated it in August of the following year.

== Architecture ==
Built of brick, Immaculate Conception is a Romanesque Revival structure with a gabled front divided into three bays. Each of the side bays is pierced by an entrance with fanlight and a window above, while the tower projecting from the center bay includes two oculi and an arched window above its doorway. A belfry with louvering is placed within the tower in the small space between the roofline of the rest of the building and the top of the tower. Unlike the bays in the facade, the side bays are almost totally occupied by large Romanesque windows, while a cornice of miniature arches sits under the eaves between the brackets. Moreover, the interior possesses complexity uncommon in rural Appalachian Ohio, due to components such as a vaulted ceiling, polychromy, and a grand high altar. The church's dedication to the Virgin prompts its primary paint color to be a light blue, although rose and gold are extensively used as a reference to Christ the King. Outside, the church is the primary component of Fulda's built environment: its location on a hilltop highlights the west-facing building's architecture, which is of far grander style than any other building in the community.

== Preservation ==
Immaculate Conception remains an active part of the Diocese of Steubenville, being one of its five parishes in Noble County.

In 1980, the church was listed on the National Register of Historic Places under the name "St. Mary's Church of the Immaculate Conception"; it qualified both because of its historically significant architecture and because of its significant place in local history. It is one of nine Noble County locations on the National Register; among the others is St. Henry's Church in Harriettsville, which Immaculate Conception supported in the two parishes' earliest years.
