= Rochester, Noble County, Ohio =

Unincorporated community in Ohio

Coordinates: 39°49′51″N 81°31′24″W

Rochester is an unincorporated community in Noble County, in the U.S. state of Ohio.

== History ==
Rochester was laid out in 1841 (184 years ago). The post office at Rochester was called Nobleville. This post office was established in 1851, and remained in operation until 1904.
