= Gem, Ohio =

Unincorporated community in Ohio, U.S.

Coordinates: 39°39′50″N 81°25′34″W

Gem is an unincorporated community in Noble County, in the U.S. state of Ohio.

== History ==
Gem was founded in 1892 by Thomas R. Harper, who built a store there and became the community's first postmaster. A post office was established at Gem in 1895, and remained in operation until 1904.
