= Olive Township, Noble County, Ohio =

Township in Ohio, US

- Township
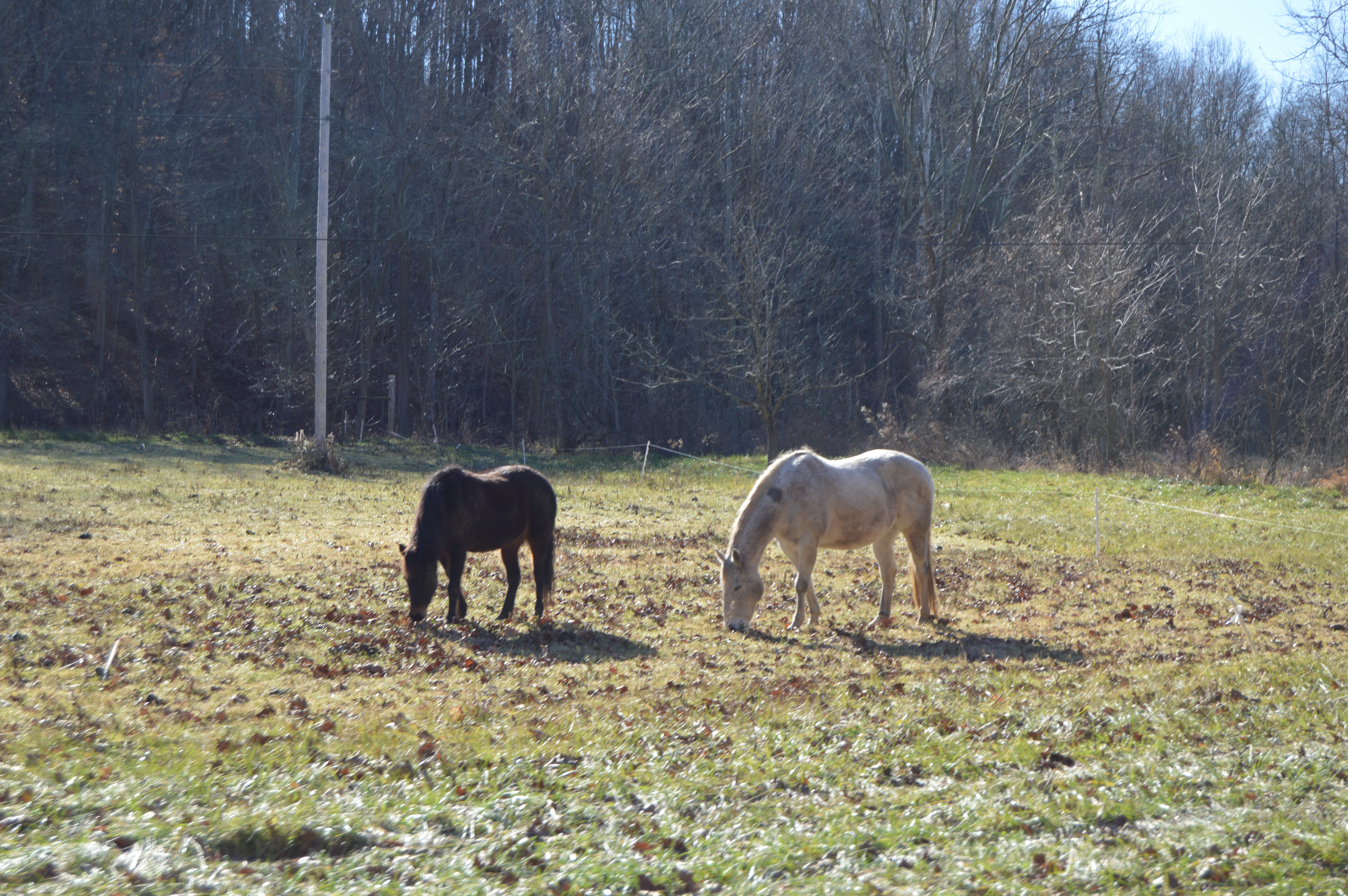
- Horses in a pasture east of Caldwell

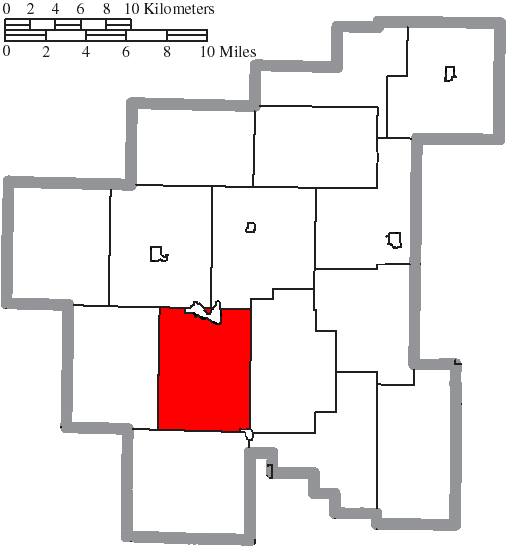
- Location of Olive Township in Noble County
- Coordinates: 39°43′52″N 81°30′54″W
- Country: United States
- State: Ohio
- County: Noble

Area
  - Total: 27.7 sq mi (71.8 km^{2})
  - Land: 27.7 sq mi (71.7 km^{2})
  - Water: 0.039 sq mi (0.1 km^{2})
- Elevation: 774 ft (236 m)

Population (2020)
  - Total: 5,724
  - Density: 207/sq mi (79.8/km^{2})
- Time zone: UTC-5 (Eastern (EST))
  - Summer (DST): UTC-4 (EDT)
- FIPS code: 39-58310
- GNIS feature ID: 1086749

Olive Township is one of the fifteen townships of Noble County, Ohio, United States. The 2020 census found 5,724 people in the township.

== Geography ==
Located in the south central part of the county, it borders the following townships:

- Center Township - northeast
- Enoch Township - east
- Jefferson Township - southwest corner
- Jackson Township - south
- Sharon Township - west
- Noble Township - northwest

Most of the village of Caldwell, the county seat and by far the biggest village of Noble County, is in northern Olive Township. A small corner of the village of Dexter City is also in the township's far southeast.

== Name and history ==
Statewide, the only other Olive Township is in Meigs County.

== Government ==
The township is governed by a three-member board of trustees, who are elected in November of odd-numbered years to a four-year term beginning on the following January 1. Two are elected in the year after the presidential election and one is elected in the year before it. There is also an elected township fiscal officer, who serves a four-year term beginning on April 1 of the year after the election, which is held in November of the year before the presidential election. Vacancies in the fiscal officership or on the board of trustees are filled by the remaining trustees.
