= Honesty, Ohio =

Unincorporated community in Ohio, U.S.

Coordinates: 39°35′15″N 81°29′07″W

Honesty is an unincorporated community in Noble County, in the U.S. state of Ohio.

== History ==
A post office called Honesty was established in 1898, and remained in operation until 1907.
