= Carlisle, Noble County, Ohio =

Unincorporated community in Ohio, U.S.

Coordinates: 39°44′44″N 81°21′49″W

Carlisle is an unincorporated community in Noble County, in the U.S. state of Ohio.

== History ==
Carlisle was laid out in 1838. The community once had a post office called Berne. The Berne post office closed in 1953.
