= Macksburg, Ohio =

- Village
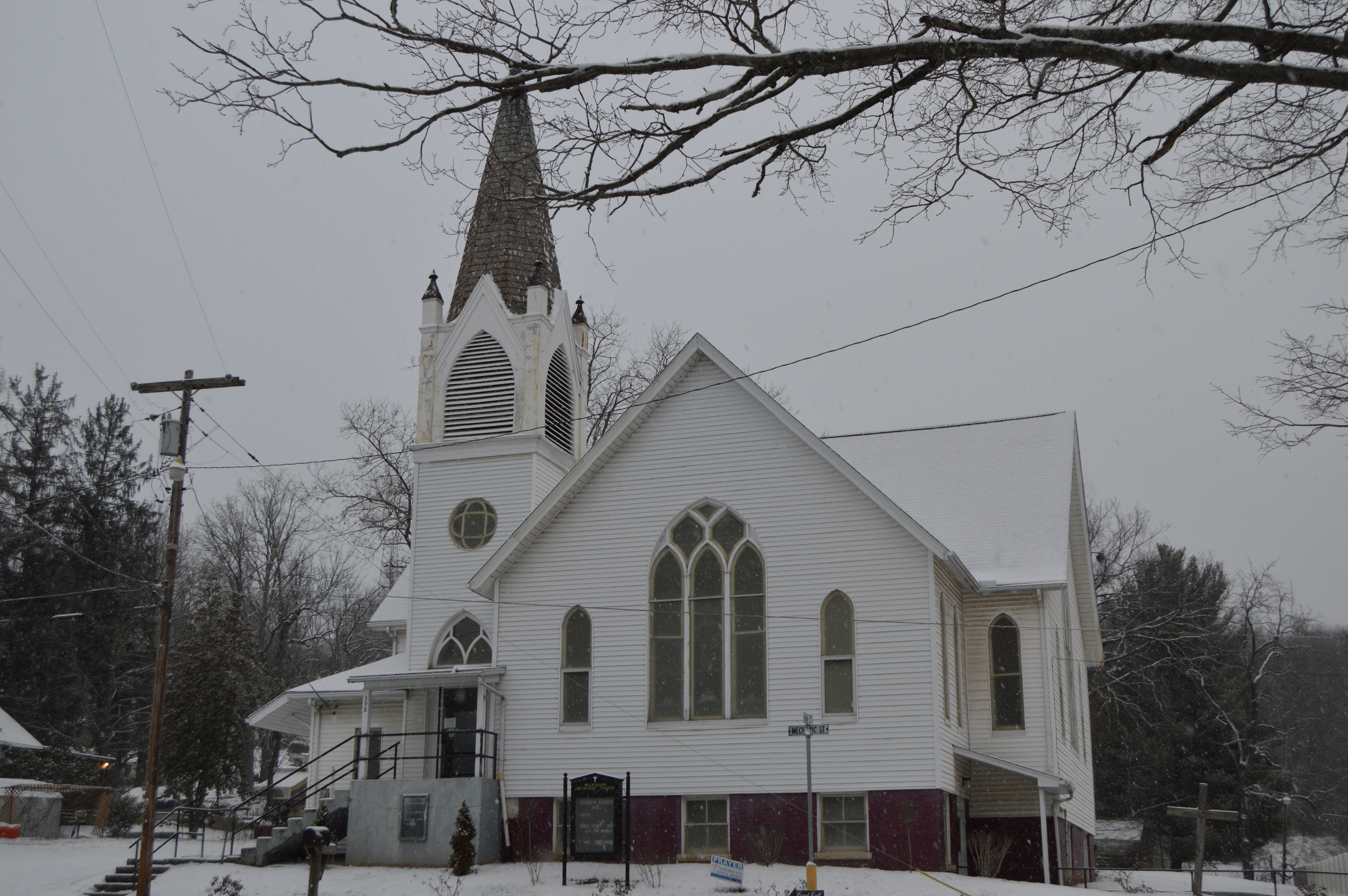
- Front of the church

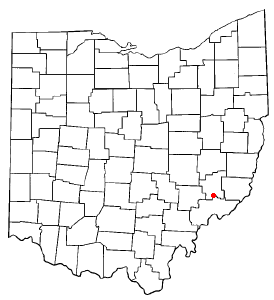
- Location of Macksburg, Ohio

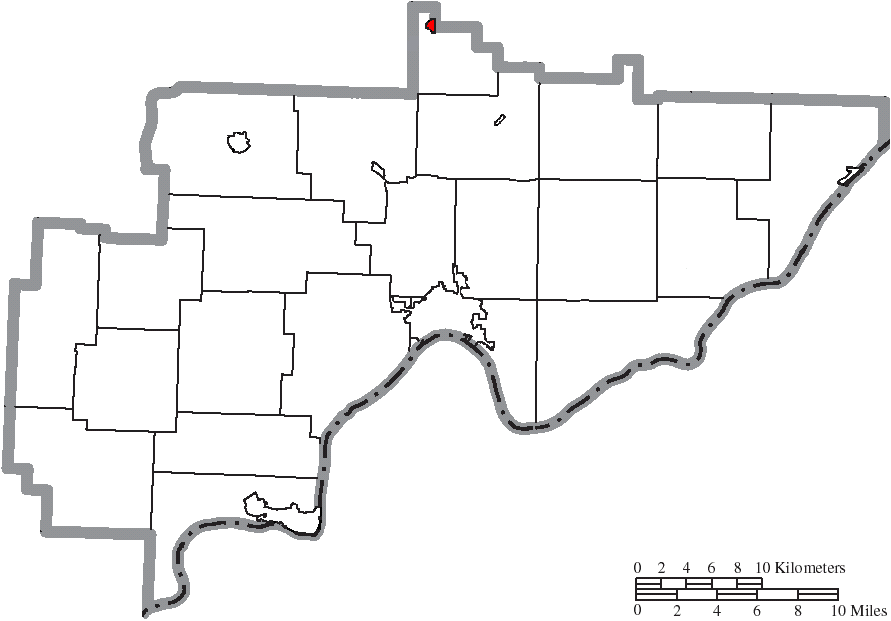
- Location of Macksburg in Washington County
- Coordinates: 39°37′53″N 81°27′23″W
- Country: United States
- State: Ohio
- County: Washington

Area
  - Total: 0.22 sq mi (0.58 km^{2})
  - Land: 0.22 sq mi (0.56 km^{2})
  - Water: 0.0077 sq mi (0.02 km^{2})
- Elevation: 692 ft (211 m)

Population (2020)
  - Total: 120
  - Density: 555.7/sq mi (214.57/km^{2})
- Time zone: UTC-5 (Eastern (EST))
  - Summer (DST): UTC-4 (EDT)
- ZIP code: 45746
- Area code: 740
- FIPS code: 39-46158
- GNIS feature ID: 2399219

Macksburg is a village in Washington County, Ohio, United States, along the West Fork of Duck Creek. The population was 120 at the 2020 census. The village is about 28 miles (45 km) south of Cambridge, Ohio.

== History ==
In 1860, an oil seep in the area of Duck Creek led to the discovery of oil at a depth of 59 feet, on William Rayley's farm. The resulting Macksburg Oil Field became one of Ohio's first oil fields. The subsequent oil boom peaked in 1886, but production had ceased by 1900.

A post office called Macksburg(h) has been in operation since 1873. The name may be derived from McIntosh, the name of a village merchant.

== Geography ==
According to the United States Census Bureau, the village has a total area of 0.23 square miles (0.60 km^{2}), of which 0.22 square miles (0.57 km^{2}) is land and 0.01 square miles (0.03 km^{2}) is water.

== Demographics ==
Historical population
Census	Pop.	Note	%±
1880	249		—
1890	533		114.1%
1900	448		−15.9%
1910	454		1.3%
1920	389		−14.3%
1930	320		−17.7%
1940	283		−11.6%
1950	272		−3.9%
1960	314		15.4%
1970	266		−15.3%
1980	295		10.9%
1990	218		−26.1%
2000	202		−7.3%
2010	186		−7.9%
2020	120		−35.5%
U.S. Decennial Census

=== 2010 census ===
As of the census of 2010, there were 186 people, 77 households, and 50 families living in the village. The population density was 845.5 inhabitants per square mile (326.4/km^{2}). There were 81 housing units at an average density of 368.2 per square mile (142.2/km^{2}). The racial makeup of the village was 100.0% White.

There were 77 households, of which 28.6% had children under the age of 18 living with them, 35.1% were married couples living together, 18.2% had a female householder with no husband present, 11.7% had a male householder with no wife present, and 35.1% were non-families. 26.0% of all households were made up of individuals, and 9.1% had someone living alone who was 65 years of age or older. The average household size was 2.42 and the average family size was 2.90.

The median age in the village was 40 years. 20.4% of residents were under the age of 18; 10.2% were between the ages of 18 and 24; 24.8% were from 25 to 44; 30.6% were from 45 to 64; and 14% were 65 years of age or older. The gender makeup of the village was 54.3% male and 45.7% female.

=== 2000 census ===
As of the census of 2000, there were 202 people, 80 households, and 51 families living in the village. The population density was 866.4 inhabitants per square mile (334.5/km^{2}). There were 92 housing units at an average density of 394.6 per square mile (152.4/km^{2}). The racial makeup of the village was 99.50% White, and 0.50% from two or more races. Hispanic or Latino of any race were 0.99% of the population.

There were 80 households, out of which 30.0% had children under the age of 18 living with them, 43.8% were married couples living together, 11.3% had a female householder with no husband present, and 36.3% were non-families. 30.0% of all households were made up of individuals, and 11.3% had someone living alone who was 65 years of age or older. The average household size was 2.53 and the average family size was 3.16.

In the village, the population was spread out, with 26.7% under the age of 18, 7.9% from 18 to 24, 27.7% from 25 to 44, 26.7% from 45 to 64, and 10.9% who were 65 years of age or older. The median age was 36 years. For every 100 females there were 122.0 males. For every 100 females age 18 and over, there were 102.7 males.

The median income for a household in the village was $22,188, and the median income for a family was $21,875. Males had a median income of $16,625 versus $17,321 for females. The per capita income for the village was $10,440. About 37.8% of families and 45.3% of the population were below the poverty line, including 72.5% of those under the age of eighteen and 21.7% of those 65 or over.

== Education ==
It is in the Caldwell Exempted Village School District.

== See also ==
- Petroleum industry in Ohio
