= Steamtown, Ohio =

Unincorporated community in Ohio, U.S.

Coordinates: 39°48′59″N 81°21′35″W

Steamtown is an unincorporated community in Noble County, in the U.S. state of Ohio.

== History ==
Steamtown had its start in 1840 when a steam gristmill was built at that point.
