= Olive Green, Noble County, Ohio =

Unincorporated community in Ohio, U.S.

Coordinates: 39°44′40″N 81°36′52″W

Olive Green is an unincorporated community in Noble County, in the U.S. state of Ohio.

== History ==
Olive Green had its start in 1856 when a store was built there; later that same year a mill was built there as well. The community derives its name from the nearby Olive Green Creek. A post office was established at Olive Green in 1857, and remained in operation until 1925.
