= Hoskinsville, Ohio =

Unincorporated community in Ohio, U.S.

Coordinates: 39°46′16″N 81°35′31″W

Hoskinsville is an unincorporated community in Noble County, in the U.S. state of Ohio.

== History ==
A post office was established at Hoskinsville in 1827, and remained in operation until 1910. Colonel Erastus Hoskins, the first postmaster, gave the community its name. The town site was not platted until 1839.
