= South Olive, Ohio =

Unincorporated community in Ohio, U.S.

Coordinates: 39°40′08″N 81°29′10″W

South Olive is an unincorporated community in Noble County, in the U.S. state of Ohio.

== History ==
South Olive was laid out in 1871 when the railroad was extended to that point.
