= Center Township, Noble County, Ohio =

Township in Ohio, US

- Township
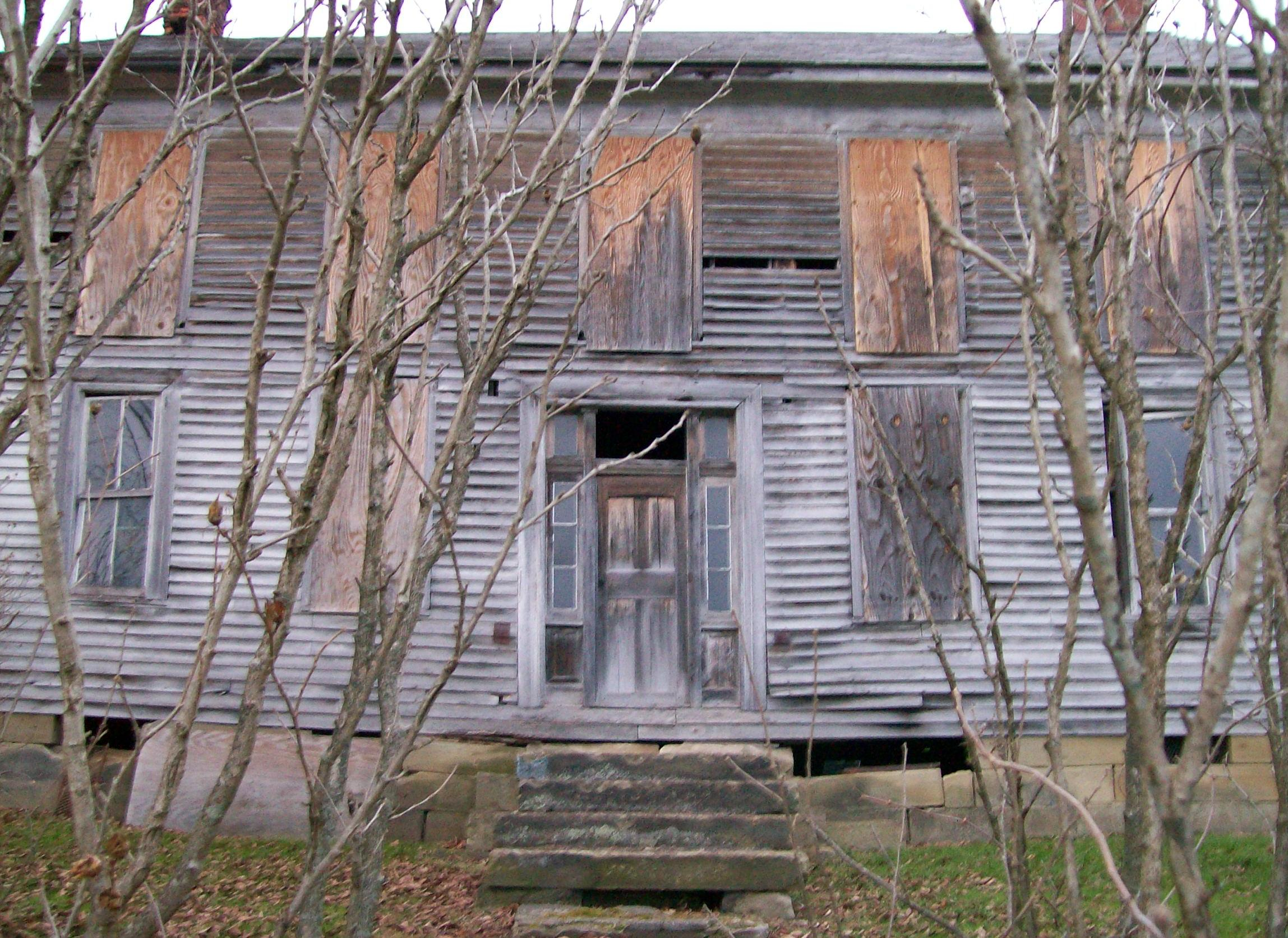
- Abandoned Young-Shaw House on State Route 246

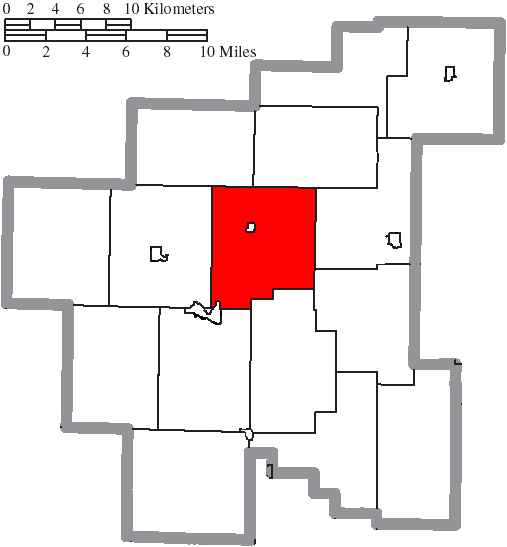
- Location of Center Township in Noble County
- Coordinates: 39°47′43″N 81°27′59″W
- Country: United States
- State: Ohio
- County: Noble

Area
  - Total: 28.3 sq mi (73.3 km^{2})
  - Land: 28.3 sq mi (73.3 km^{2})
  - Water: 0 sq mi (0.0 km^{2})
- Elevation: 942 ft (287 m)

Population (2020)
  - Total: 1,073
  - Density: 37.9/sq mi (14.6/km^{2})
- Time zone: UTC-5 (Eastern (EST))
  - Summer (DST): UTC-4 (EDT)
- FIPS code: 39-12994
- GNIS feature ID: 1086742

Center Township is one of the fifteen townships of Noble County, Ohio, United States. The 2020 census found 1,073 people in the township.

== Geography ==
Located at the center of the county, it borders the following townships:

- Seneca Township - northeast
- Marion Township - east
- Stock Township - southeast
- Enoch Township - south
- Olive Township - southwest
- Noble Township - west
- Buffalo Township - northwest

The village of Sarahsville, the fourth largest village in Noble County, is located in central Center Township. A small corner of Caldwell, the county seat, also extends into the far southwest of the township.

== Name and history ==
Center Township was established in 1851. It is one of nine Center Townships statewide.

== Government ==
The township is governed by a three-member board of trustees, who are elected in November of odd-numbered years to a four-year term beginning on the following January 1. Two are elected in the year after the presidential election and one is elected in the year before it. There is also an elected township fiscal officer, who serves a four-year term beginning on April 1 of the year after the election, which is held in November of the year before the presidential election. Vacancies in the fiscal officership or on the board of trustees are filled by the remaining trustees.
