= Noble County Airport =

Public use airport near Caldwell, Ohio

- IATA: none; ICAO: none; FAA LID: I10

Summary
- Airport type: Public
- Owner: Noble County Airport Authority
- Location: Caldwell, Ohio
- Time zone: UTC−05:00 (-5)
  - Summer (DST): UTC−04:00 (-4)
- Elevation AMSL: 879 ft / 268 m
- Coordinates: 39°48′03″N 081°32′10″W

Map
- Location of airport in Ohio I10 (the United States)

Runways
Direction	Length		Surface
Direction	ft	m	Surface
5/23	3,811	1,162	Asphalt

Statistics (2023)
- Aircraft Operations: 6,200
- Based aircraft: 10
- Sources: Federal Aviation Administration, AirNav, SkyVector

Noble County Airport, also known as Mike Brienza Field, (FAA LID: I10) is a public use airport located 3 nautical miles north of Caldwell, Ohio.

== History ==
Construction on a 4,000-foot (1,200 m) runway had begun by late July 1964. The airport was dedicated on 25 October 1964. When it was completed, it was the first small airport built under Governor Jim Rhodes and the impetus for his larger plan for every county in the state to have an airport. By 1968, the airport was being used by strip mining companies and contractors building I-77.

A proposal in February 1979 to build a communications tower was opposed by the airport authority.

Caldwell village council agreed to seal the runway in October 1983. A contract to repair the non-runway paved surfaces was awarded in August 1986.

The runway was again repaved in October 1992.

A series of improvements were made to the fly-in camp area were made in 2020 and 2024. A 2026 state grant provided for the replacement of the runway lighting.

== Facilities and aircraft ==
=== Facilities ===
Noble County Airport has one runway, designated 5/23 with an asphalt surface measuring 3,811 by 65 feet (1,162 x 20 m).

The airport does not have a fixed-base operator. Parking includes tie-downs for visiting aircraft.

It is adjacent to Wolf Run State Park and a fly-in camping area is located at the airport.

=== Aircraft ===
Based on the 12-month period ending 7 June 2023, the airport had 6,200 aircraft operations, an average of 119 per week. This includes 96% general aviation, and 3% military.

For the same time period, 10 aircraft are based on the field. All were single-engine airplanes.

== See also ==
- List of airports in Ohio
