= Dungannon, Noble County, Ohio =

Unincorporated community in Ohio, U.S.

Coordinates: 39°36′54″N 81°34′20″W

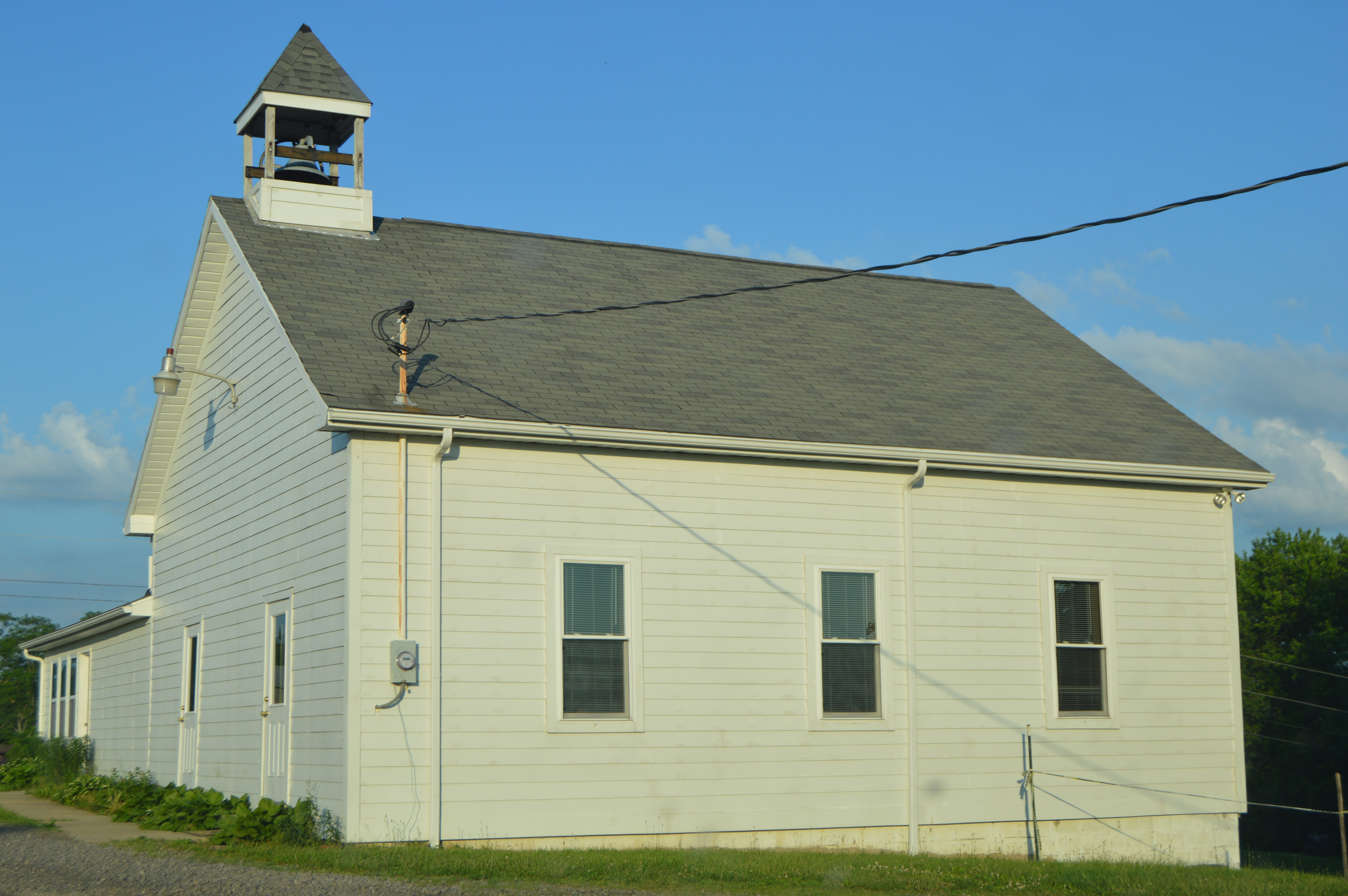
Dungannon United Methodist church on Crooked Tree Road

Dungannon is an unincorporated community in Noble County, Ohio, United States.

== History ==
Dungannon was laid out in 1856. The post office once located at Dungannon was called Ridge. This post office operated from 1867 until 1904.
