= Fulda, Ohio =

Unincorporated community in Ohio, U.S.

Coordinates: 39.72452°N 81.41568°W

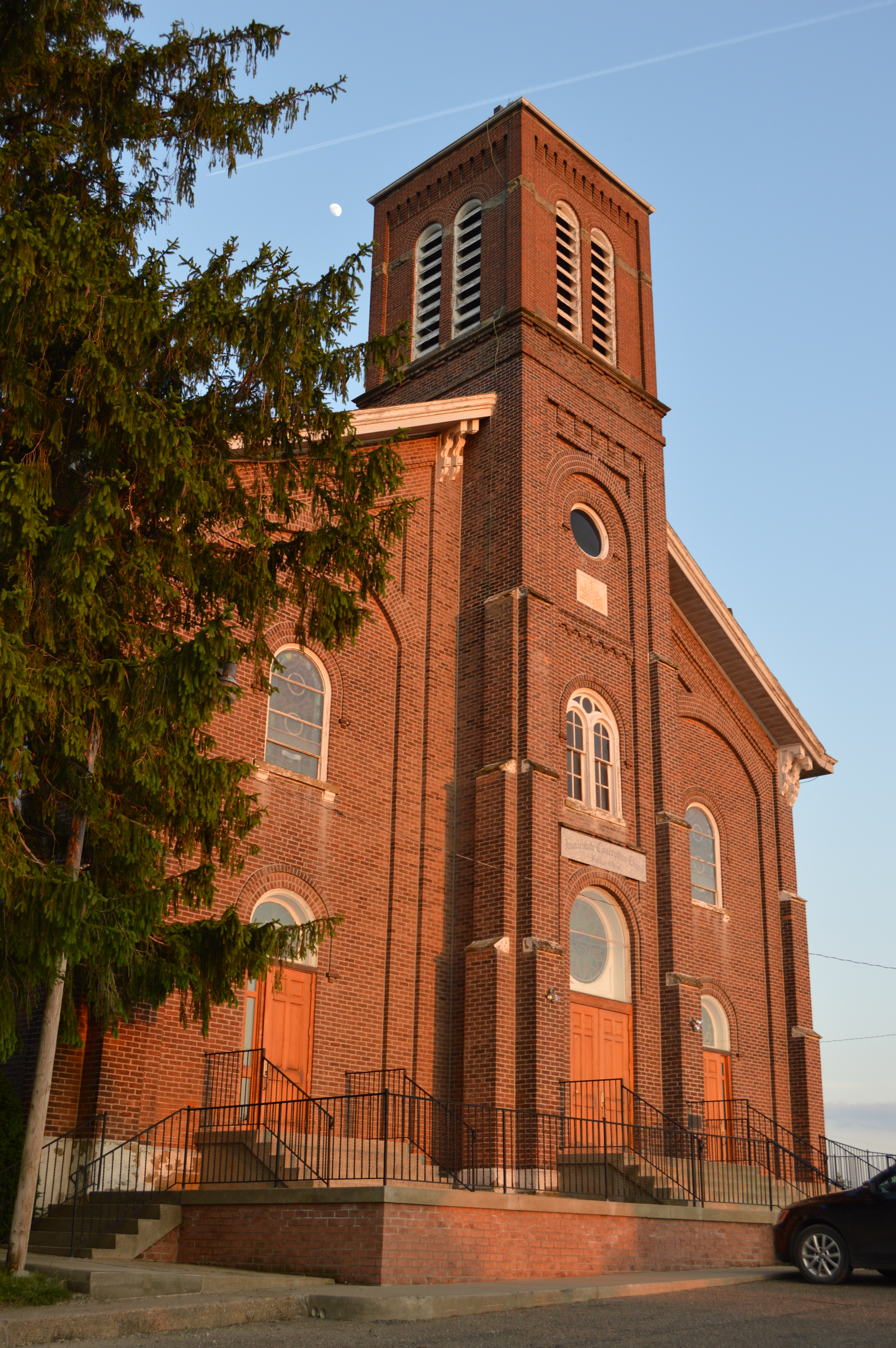
Immaculate Conception Church

Fulda is an unincorporated community in Noble County, Ohio, United States.

== History ==
Fulda was platted in 1861. The community was named after Fulda, in Germany, the native land of a large share of the early settlers. A post office was established at Fulda in 1875, and remained in operation until 1904.

The Immaculate Conception Catholic Church in Fulda is listed on the National Register of Historic Places.

Fulda, Ohio is noteworthy for sporting a few notable descendants. AAGPBL player Betty Jane Cornett (1932–2006) had a paternal grandmother with siblings who immigrated from Germany to the southeastern Ohio area, including Fulda. Cornett herself was born and raised within the Spring Hill, Pennsylvania. Paleoconservative politician Pat Buchanan (born 1938) and his sister, fellow conservative political commentator and United States Treasurer under Ronald Reagan, Angela "Bay" Buchanan (born 1948), had maternal relatives who were born and raised in Fulda before moving to Finleyville, Pennsylvania. The Buchanans' mother then moved to Washington, D.C., where Pat and "Bay" were born and raised. Singer ("shock rocker"), songwriter, musician, composer, painter, author, and part-time music journalist and actor Brian Hugh Warner, better known by his stage name Marilyn Manson (born 1969), had paternal relatives who were born and raised in Fulda before moving to Louisville, Ohio (Warner/Manson himself was born and raised within nearby Canton, Ohio). In fact, the Buchanans and Warner share a common ancestor, and are roughly fourth cousins to each other.
