= Dexter City, Ohio =

- Village
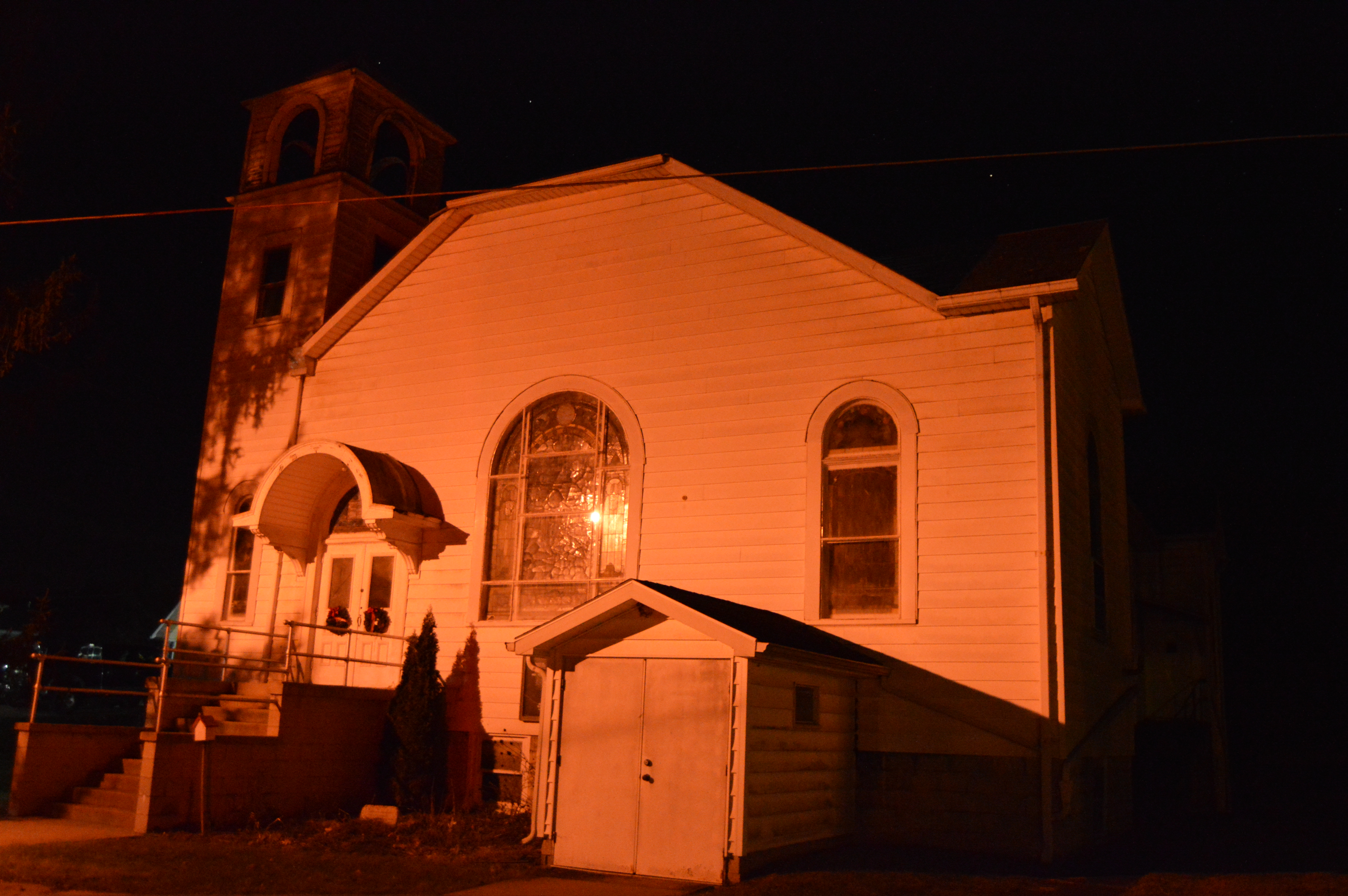
- Methodist church

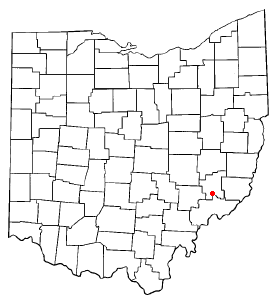
- Location of Dexter City, Ohio

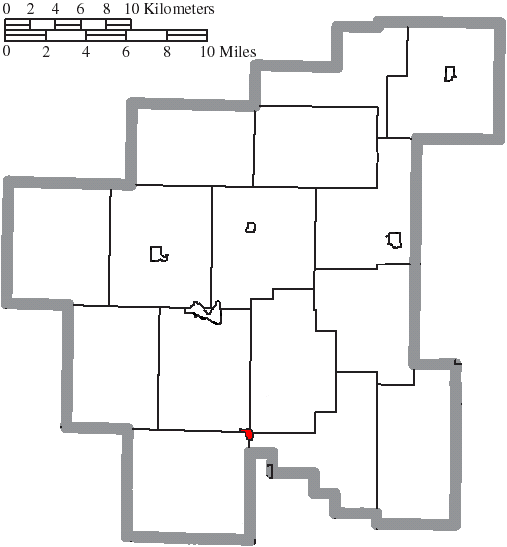
- Location of Dexter City in Noble County
- Coordinates: 39°39′33″N 81°28′26″W
- Country: United States
- State: Ohio
- County: Noble

Area
  - Total: 0.17 sq mi (0.45 km^{2})
  - Land: 0.17 sq mi (0.43 km^{2})
  - Water: 0.0077 sq mi (0.02 km^{2})
- Elevation: 742 ft (226 m)

Population (2020)
  - Total: 81
  - Estimate (2023): 79
  - Density: 486.0/sq mi (187.66/km^{2})
- Time zone: UTC-5 (Eastern (EST))
  - Summer (DST): UTC-4 (EDT)
- ZIP code: 45727
- Area code: 740
- FIPS code: 39-21910
- GNIS feature ID: 2398720

Dexter City is a village in Noble County, Ohio, United States, along the West Fork of Duck Creek. The population was 81 at the 2020 census.

== History ==
Dexter City was laid out in 1870, and named after Dexter W. Sullivan, an early settler.

== Geography ==
According to the United States Census Bureau, the village has a total area of 0.2 square miles (0.5 km^{2}), all of it land.

== Demographics ==
Historical population
Census	Pop.	Note	%±
1880	255		—
1890	217		−14.9%
1900	278		28.1%
1910	235		−15.5%
1920	212		−9.8%
1930	209		−1.4%
1940	191		−8.6%
1950	170		−11.0%
1960	197		15.9%
1970	178		−9.6%
1980	173		−2.8%
1990	161		−6.9%
2000	166		3.1%
2010	129		−22.3%
2020	81		−37.2%
2023 (est.)	79	▼	−2.5%
U.S. Decennial Census

=== 2010 census ===
As of the census of 2010, there were 129 people, 51 households, and 36 families living in the village. The population density was 758.8 inhabitants per square mile (293.0/km^{2}). There were 56 housing units at an average density of 329.4 per square mile (127.2/km^{2}). The racial makeup of the village was 95.3% White, 0.8% African American, and 3.9% from two or more races.

There were 51 households, of which 31.4% had children under the age of 18 living with them, 51.0% were married couples living together, 13.7% had a female householder with no husband present, 5.9% had a male householder with no wife present, and 29.4% were non-families. 25.5% of all households were made up of individuals, and 9.8% had someone living alone who was 65 years of age or older. The average household size was 2.53 and the average family size was 2.97.

The median age in the village was 38.5 years. 27.1% of residents were under the age of 18; 7.1% were between the ages of 18 and 24; 24.9% were from 25 to 44; 30.3% were from 45 to 64; and 10.9% were 65 years of age or older. The gender makeup of the village was 49.6% male and 50.4% female.

=== 2000 census ===
As of the census of 2000, there were 166 people, 63 households, and 45 families living in the village. The population density was 948.4 inhabitants per square mile (366.2/km^{2}). There were 66 housing units at an average density of 377.1 per square mile (145.6/km^{2}). The racial makeup of the village was 100.00% White.

There were 63 households, out of which 39.7% had children under the age of 18 living with them, 49.2% were married couples living together, 17.5% had a female householder with no husband present, and 27.0% were non-families. 23.8% of all households were made up of individuals, and 11.1% had someone living alone who was 65 years of age or older. The average household size was 2.63 and the average family size was 3.04.

In the village, the population was spread out, with 29.5% under the age of 18, 7.2% from 18 to 24, 30.7% from 25 to 44, 24.1% from 45 to 64, and 8.4% who were 65 years of age or older. The median age was 35 years. For every 100 females there were 102.4 males. For every 100 females age 18 and over, there were 82.8 males.

The median income for a household in the village was $30,469, and the median income for a family was $35,000. Males had a median income of $31,250 versus $23,750 for females. The per capita income for the village was $11,881. About 18.2% of families and 21.6% of the population were below the poverty line, including 21.6% of those under the age of eighteen and 28.6% of those 65 or over.
