= Dungannon, Columbiana County, Ohio =

Dungannon, Ohio
- Unincorporated community
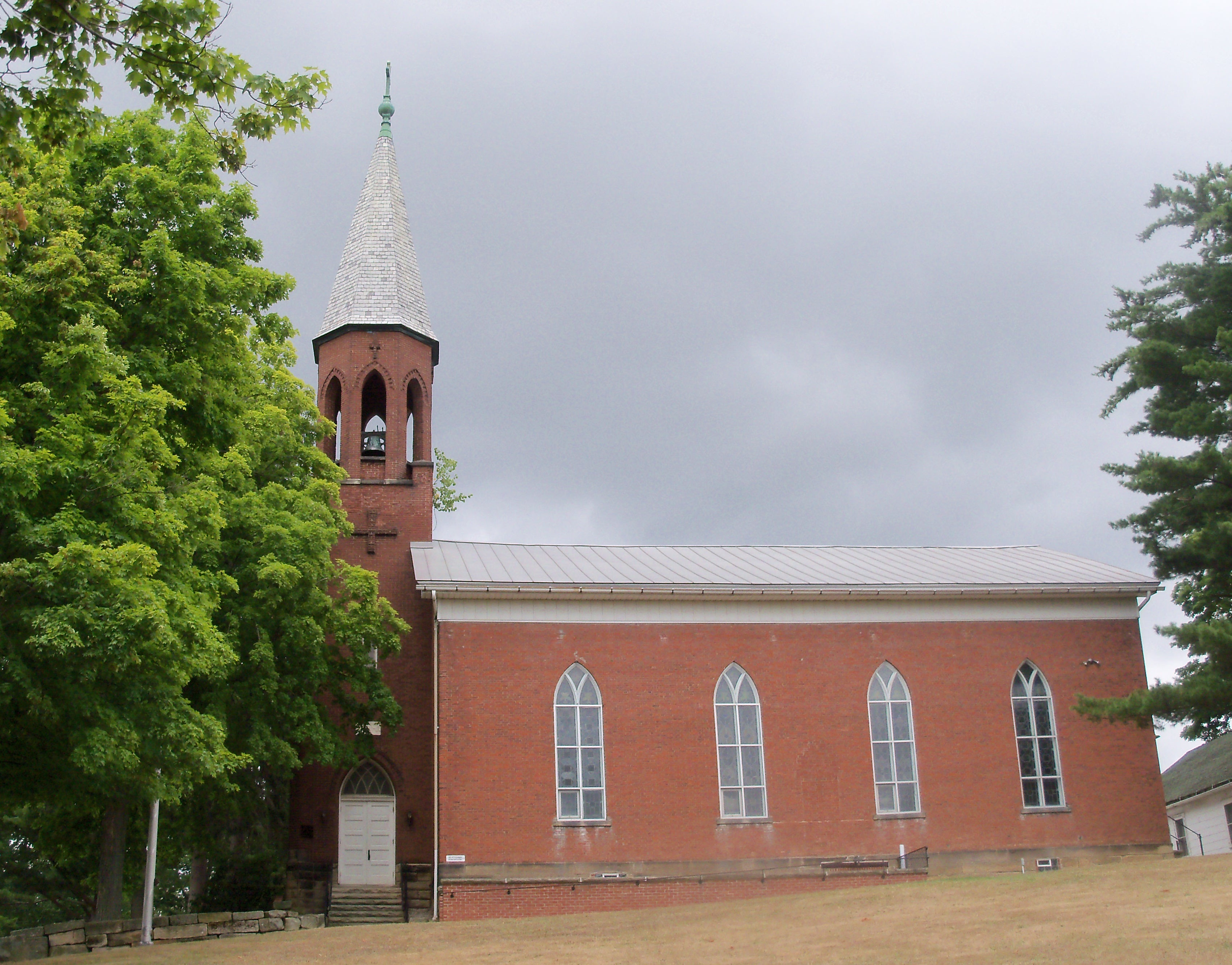
- St. Philip Neri Catholic Church

- Location within Ohio Location within the United States
- Coordinates: 40°44′03″N 80°52′43″W
- Country: United States
- State: Ohio
- County: Columbiana
- Township: Hanover
- Elevation: 1,122 ft (342 m)
- Time zone: UTC-5 (Eastern (EST))
  - Summer (DST): UTC-4 (EDT)
- ZIP code: 44423
- Area codes: 330, 234
- GNIS Feature ID: 1064567

Dungannon is an unincorporated community in Hanover Township, Columbiana County, Ohio, United States.

== History ==
Dungannon was laid out in 1835 by George Sloan when the Sandy and Beaver Canal was extended to that point. He named the community after Dungannon, Northern Ireland, his native home.

A post office was established at Dungannon in 1840, and remained in operation until it was discontinued in 1903. The post office was originally spelt "Dunganon" before being changed to the current spelling of "Dungannon" in 1871.
