= Noble County, Ohio =

County in Ohio, United States

- County
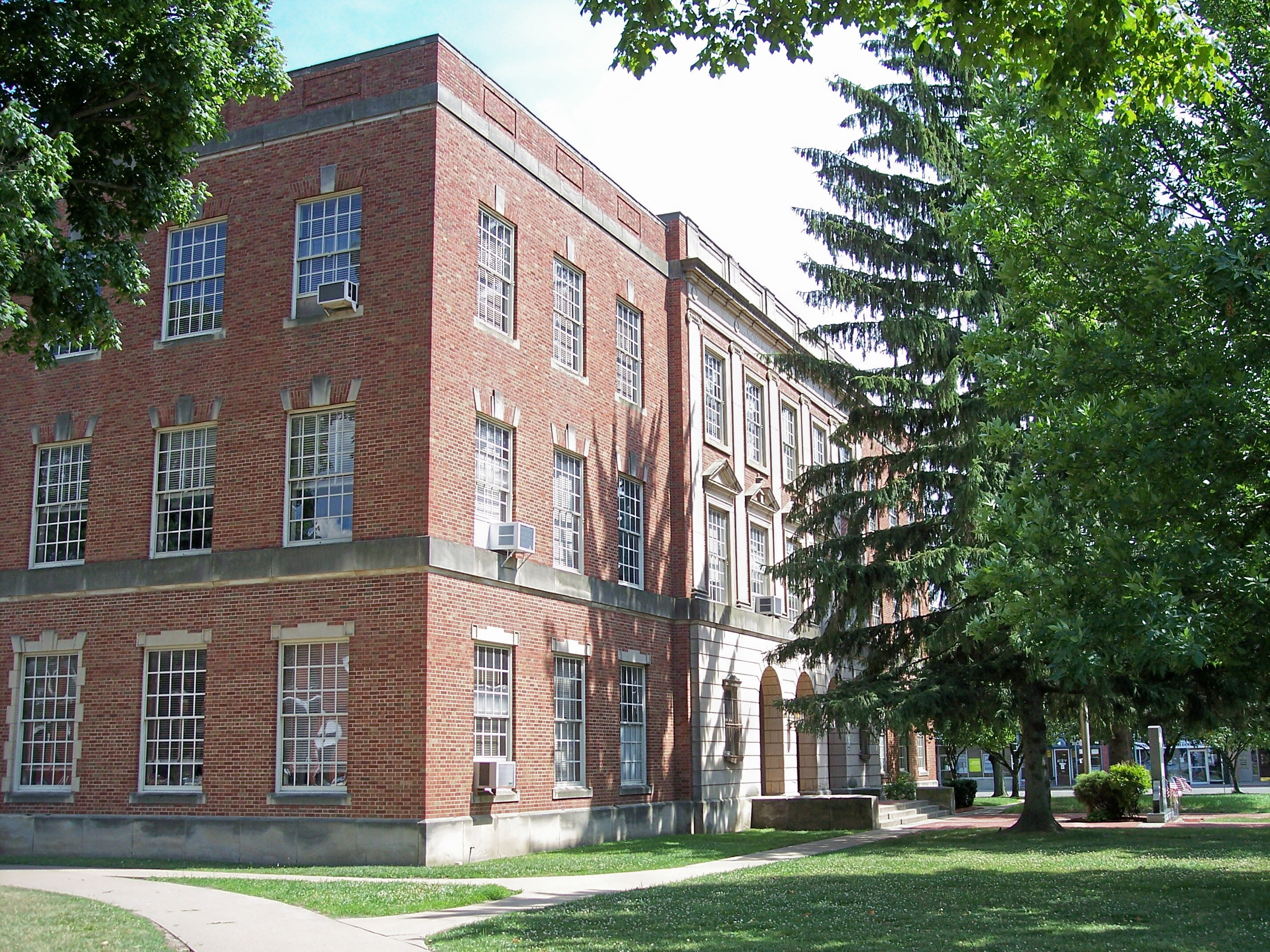
- The Noble County Courthouse in Caldwell in 2007

- Flag Seal

- Location within the U.S. state of Ohio
- Coordinates: 39°46′N 81°27′W
- Country: United States
- State: Ohio
- Founded: April 1, 1851
- Named for: either James Noble or Warren P. Noble
- Seat: Caldwell
- Largest village: Caldwell

Area
  - Total: 405 sq mi (1,050 km^{2})
  - Land: 398 sq mi (1,030 km^{2})
  - Water: 6.6 sq mi (17 km^{2}) 1.6%

Population (2020)
  - Total: 14,115
  - Estimate (2025): 14,276 ▲
  - Density: 36/sq mi (14/km^{2})
- Time zone: UTC−5 (Eastern)
  - Summer (DST): UTC−4 (EDT)
- Congressional district: 6th
- Website: noblecountyohio.gov

Noble County is a county located in the southeastern part of the U.S. state of Ohio. As of the 2020 census, the population was 14,115, making it the fourth-least populous county in Ohio. Its county seat is Caldwell. The county is named for Rep. Warren P. Noble of the Ohio House of Representatives, who was an early settler there.

== History ==
Noble County was formed on March 11, 1851, from portions of Guernsey, Morgan, Monroe and Washington counties. It was the last county to be formed in the state. It was named for either James Noble or Warren P. Noble, each of whom was an early settler in this region.

Noble County was home to the first North American oil well, the Thorla-McKee Well, which struck oil in 1814. For a time this was a center of oil production in the state.

In 1925, a United States Navy dirigible, USS Shenandoah (ZR-1), was caught in a storm over Noble County. It broke into several pieces, resulting in the deaths of 14 persons on board; 29 survived.

== Geography ==
According to the United States Census Bureau, the county has a total area of 405 square miles (1,050 km^{2}), of which 398 square miles (1,030 km^{2}) is land and 6.6 square miles (17 km^{2}) (1.6%) is water.

=== Adjacent counties ===
- Guernsey County (north)
- Belmont County (northeast)
- Monroe County (east)
- Washington County (south)
- Morgan County (west)
- Muskingum County (northwest)

=== National protected area ===
- Wayne National Forest (part)

== Demographics ==
Historical population
Census	Pop.	Note	%±
1860	20,751		—
1870	19,949		−3.9%
1880	21,138		6.0%
1890	20,753		−1.8%
1900	19,466		−6.2%
1910	18,601		−4.4%
1920	17,849		−4.0%
1930	14,961		−16.2%
1940	14,587		−2.5%
1950	11,750		−19.4%
1960	10,982		−6.5%
1970	10,428		−5.0%
1980	11,310		8.5%
1990	11,336		0.2%
2000	14,058		24.0%
2010	14,645		4.2%
2020	14,115		−3.6%
2025 (est.)	14,276	▲	1.1%
U.S. Decennial Census; 1790-1960 1900-1990; 1990-2000 2010-2020 2025

=== 2020 census ===
As of the 2020 census, the county had a population of 14,115 and a median age of 40.4 years. 19.0% of residents were under the age of 18 and 17.1% of residents were 65 years of age or older. For every 100 females there were 144.6 males, and for every 100 females age 18 and over there were 154.7 males.

The racial makeup of the county was 91.3% White, 5.4% Black or African American, 0.2% American Indian and Alaska Native, 0.2% Asian, <0.1% Native Hawaiian and Pacific Islander, 0.6% from some other race, and 2.4% from two or more races, with Hispanic or Latino residents of any race comprising 1.2% of the population.

<0.1% of residents lived in urban areas, while 100.0% lived in rural areas.

There were 4,725 households in the county, of which 28.4% had children under the age of 18 living with them. Of all households, 51.6% were married-couple households, 19.3% were households with a male householder and no spouse or partner present, and 21.7% were households with a female householder and no spouse or partner present. About 28.5% of all households were made up of individuals and 13.8% had someone living alone who was 65 years of age or older. There were 5,751 housing units, of which 17.8% were vacant. Among occupied housing units, 78.1% were owner-occupied and 21.9% were renter-occupied; the homeowner vacancy rate was 1.4% and the rental vacancy rate was 5.7%.

=== Racial and ethnic composition ===
Noble County, Ohio – Racial and ethnic composition Note: the US Census treats Hispanic/Latino as an ethnic category. This table excludes Latinos from the racial categories and assigns them to a separate category. Hispanics/Latinos may be of any race.
Race / Ethnicity (NH = Non-Hispanic)	Pop 1980	Pop 1990	Pop 2000	Pop 2010	Pop 2020	% 1980	% 1990	% 2000	% 2010	% 2020
White alone (NH)	11,242	11,282	12,959	14,036	12,840	99.40%	99.52%	92.18%	95.84%	90.97%
Black or African American alone (NH)	3	7	938	368	752	0.03%	0.06%	6.67%	2.51%	5.33%
Native American or Alaska Native alone (NH)	14	15	37	42	31	0.12%	0.13%	0.26%	0.29%	0.22%
Asian alone (NH)	9	9	13	20	22	0.08%	0.08%	0.09%	0.14%	0.16%
Native Hawaiian or Pacific Islander alone (NH)	x	x	0	3	0	x	x	0.00%	0.02%	0.00%
Other race alone (NH)	7	0	0	14	11	0.06%	0.00%	0.00%	0.10%	0.08%
Mixed race or Multiracial (NH)	x	x	51	110	286	x	x	0.36%	0.75%	2.03%
Hispanic or Latino (any race)	35	23	60	52	173	0.31%	0.20%	0.43%	0.36%	1.23%
Total	11,310	11,336	14,058	14,645	14,115	100.00%	100.00%	100.00%	100.00%	100.00%

=== 2010 census ===
As of the 2010 United States census, there were 14,645 people, 4,852 households, and 3,394 families living in the county. The population density was 36.8 inhabitants per square mile (14.2/km^{2}). There were 6,053 housing units at an average density of 15.2 units per square mile (5.9 units/km^{2}). The racial makeup of the county was 96.1% white, 2.5% black or African American, 0.3% American Indian, 0.1% Asian, 0.2% from other races, and 0.8% from two or more races. Those of Hispanic or Latino origin made up 0.4% of the population. In terms of ancestry, 25.9% were German, 13.1% were Irish, 9.1% were American, and 9.0% were English.

Of the 4,852 households, 30.4% had children under the age of 18 living with them, 55.8% were married couples living together, 8.6% had a female householder with no husband present, 30.0% were non-families, and 25.7% of all households were made up of individuals. The average household size was 2.47 and the average family size was 2.94. The median age was 48.6 years.

The median income for a household in the county was $39,500 and the median income for a family was $44,773. Males had a median income of $42,456 versus $29,551 for females. The per capita income for the county was $20,029. About 11.6% of families and 14.9% of the population were below the poverty line, including 22.9% of those under age 18 and 13.8% of those age 65 or over.

=== 2000 census ===
As of the census of 2000, there were 14,058 people, 4,546 households, and 3,318 families living in the county. The population density was 35 people per square mile (14 people/km^{2}). There were 5,480 housing units at an average density of 14 units per square mile (5.4/km^{2}). The racial makeup of the county was 92.55% White, 6.69% Black or African American, 0.26% Native American, 0.09% Asian, 0.03% from other races, and 0.38% from two or more races. 0.43% of the population were Hispanic or Latino of any race.

There were 4,546 households, out of which 33.50% had children under the age of 18 living with them, 61.50% were married couples living together, 7.70% had a female householder with no husband present, and 27.00% were non-families. 24.30% of all households were made up of individuals, and 12.60% had someone living alone who was 65 years of age or older. The average household size was 2.61 and the average family size was 3.10.

In the county, the population was spread out, with 22.60% under the age of 18, 11.70% from 18 to 24, 31.80% from 25 to 44, 20.80% from 45 to 64, and 13.10% who were 65 years of age or older. The median age was 36 years. For every 100 females there were 130.80 males. For every 100 females age 18 and over, there were 140.50 males.

The median income for a household in the county was $32,940, and the median income for a family was $38,939. Males had a median income of $30,911 versus $20,222 for females. The per capita income for the county was $14,100. About 8.30% of families and 11.40% of the population were below the poverty line, including 13.90% of those under age 18 and 11.90% of those age 65 or over.

== Politics ==
Noble County is a Republican stronghold in presidential elections, although Bill Clinton narrowly won it in 1996.

United States presidential election results for Noble County, Ohio
Year	Republican		Democratic		Third party(ies)	
Year	No.	%	No.	%	No.	%
1856	1,603	51.81%	1,337	43.21%	154	4.98%
1860	1,944	52.02%	1,647	44.07%	146	3.91%
1864	2,211	56.23%	1,721	43.77%	0	0.00%
1868	2,204	56.24%	1,715	43.76%	0	0.00%
1872	2,016	54.78%	1,627	44.21%	37	1.01%
1876	2,225	50.86%	2,096	47.91%	54	1.23%
1880	2,316	50.55%	2,044	44.61%	222	4.85%
1884	2,385	52.27%	2,061	45.17%	117	2.56%
1888	2,515	53.18%	2,087	44.13%	127	2.69%
1892	2,307	50.69%	2,026	44.52%	218	4.79%
1896	2,559	51.86%	2,318	46.98%	57	1.16%
1900	2,704	54.55%	2,173	43.84%	80	1.61%
1904	2,700	58.90%	1,671	36.45%	213	4.65%
1908	2,707	54.27%	2,154	43.18%	127	2.55%
1912	1,804	40.05%	1,842	40.90%	858	19.05%
1916	2,290	50.33%	2,175	47.80%	85	1.87%
1920	4,197	59.06%	2,909	40.94%	0	0.00%
1924	4,284	60.78%	2,485	35.26%	279	3.96%
1928	4,462	66.45%	2,190	32.61%	63	0.94%
1932	3,950	49.25%	3,966	49.45%	104	1.30%
1936	4,384	52.70%	3,865	46.46%	70	0.84%
1940	4,922	61.84%	3,037	38.16%	0	0.00%
1944	4,130	64.89%	2,235	35.11%	0	0.00%
1948	3,494	58.79%	2,425	40.80%	24	0.40%
1952	4,046	66.33%	2,054	33.67%	0	0.00%
1956	3,861	66.52%	1,943	33.48%	0	0.00%
1960	3,951	65.99%	2,036	34.01%	0	0.00%
1964	2,250	43.48%	2,925	56.52%	0	0.00%
1968	2,615	53.06%	1,726	35.02%	587	11.91%
1972	3,274	68.22%	1,449	30.19%	76	1.58%
1976	3,007	52.48%	2,612	45.58%	111	1.94%
1980	3,025	57.38%	1,944	36.87%	303	5.75%
1984	3,853	67.70%	1,777	31.22%	61	1.07%
1988	3,155	59.44%	2,079	39.17%	74	1.39%
1992	2,223	37.79%	2,201	37.41%	1,459	24.80%
1996	2,183	39.59%	2,366	42.91%	965	17.50%
2000	3,435	57.36%	2,296	38.34%	257	4.29%
2004	3,841	58.73%	2,654	40.58%	45	0.69%
2008	3,450	55.75%	2,474	39.98%	264	4.27%
2012	3,563	60.48%	2,131	36.17%	197	3.34%
2016	4,549	75.33%	1,221	20.22%	269	4.45%
2020	5,135	80.89%	1,170	18.43%	43	0.68%
2024	5,050	81.66%	1,069	17.29%	65	1.05%

United States Senate election results for Noble County, Ohio1
Year	Republican		Democratic		Third party(ies)	
Year	No.	%	No.	%	No.	%
2024	4,555	75.00%	1,316	21.67%	202	3.33%

== Government ==
Noble County has a three-member Board of County Commissioners that oversee and administer the various County departments, similar to all but two of the 88 Ohio counties. Noble County's elected commissioners are:

- County Commissioners: Floyd Allen Fraley (R), Gary Saling (R), and Ty Moore (R).

== Education ==
Noble County is served by the Caldwell Exempted Village School District and Noble Local School District.

== Transportation ==
The Noble County Airport is located three nautical miles (3.5 mi; 5.6 km) north of Caldwell's central business district.

== Communities ==
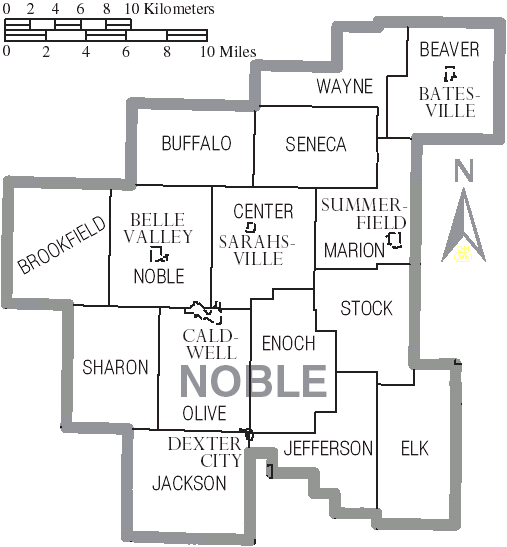
Map of Noble County, Ohio with municipal and township labels

=== Villages ===
- Batesville
- Belle Valley
- Caldwell (county seat)
- Dexter City
- Sarahsville
- Summerfield

=== Townships ===
- Beaver
- Brookfield
- Buffalo
- Center
- Elk
- Enoch
- Jackson
- Jefferson
- Marion
- Noble
- Olive
- Seneca
- Sharon
- Stock
- Wayne

=== Unincorporated communities ===
- Ava
- Carlisle
- Crooked Tree
- Dudley
- Dungannon
- East Union
- Elk
- Fulda
- Gem
- Harriettsville
- Hiramsburg
- Honesty
- Hoskinsville
- Keith
- Kennonsburg
- Middleburg
- Moundsville
- Mount Ephraim
- Olive Green
- Rochester
- Sharon
- South Olive
- Steamtown
- Whigville

== See also ==
- National Register of Historic Places listings in Noble County, Ohio
