= Keep Me a Secret =

Single by Ainslie Henderson
- Released: 24 February 2003
- Recorded: 2003
- Genre: Pop
- Length: 3:35
- Label: Mercury Records
- Songwriter(s): Ainslie Henderson; Malachi Cush; Sinéad Quinn

Ainslie Henderson singles chronology
"Keep Me a Secret" (2003)	"Coming Up for Air" (2006)

"Keep Me a Secret" is the debut single by Scottish singer-songwriter Ainslie Henderson, who rose to fame on the first series of Fame Academy. The single was released on 24 February 2003 and charted at number 5 in the UK.

== Background and production ==
Henderson wrote "Keep Me a Secret" with his Fame Academy co-stars Malachi Cush and Sinéad Quinn, the latter who had finished in second place on the show behind David Sneddon, with Henderson placing fourth behind Lemar. Sneddon topped the chart with his debut single "Stop Living the Lie", while Quinn also placed high with her number two peaking entry "I Can't Break Down" in February 2003.

== Critical reception ==
Drowned in Sound described Henderson as an "all new improved popstar" and that the influence of James in his writing had delivered a "big pop chorus that's actually really, really good". MusicOMH's review for Henderson's independently released 2006 album Growing Flowers by Candlelight describes Henderson as carrying "with his obvious charisma the suggestion of songwriting ability" and described "Keep Me a Secret" as "jaunty". In 2014, the Official Charts Company picked out "Keep Me a Secret" as one of their "pop gems", a selection of "overlooked classics" recorded by talent show contestants. The song was chosen alongside "I Can't Break Down" by Henderson's fellow Fame Academy competitor Sinead Quinn, "Sunshine" from Pop Idol series one runner-up Gareth Gates and Pop Idol winner Will Young's "Jealousy".

== Track listing and formats ==
- Europe CD Single
  1. "Keep Me A Secret"
  2. "Don't Get Me Wrong"
  3. "Take Out Time"
- UK Cassette Single
  1. "Keep Me A Secret"
  2. "Don't Get Me Wrong"
  3. "Keep Me A Secret - Acoustic Version"
- Digital Single (2023)
  1. "Keep Me A Secret" – 3:31
  2. "Don't Get Me Wrong" – 3:35
  3. "Take Out Time" – 3:29

== Chart performance ==
"Keep Me a Secret" entered the top 40 of the UK Singles Chart at its peak position of number five, with Christina Aguilera's chart-topper "Beautiful", DJ Sammy's "The Boys of Summer", tATu's former number-one "All the Things She Said" and Junior Senior's "Move Your Feet" ahead of it on the rankings. It would remain in the top 40 for two more weeks and spent a total of 11 weeks in the top 100.

== Charts ==
Chart (2003)	Peak position
UK Singles (OCC)	5
