= Comic Relief Does Fame Academy series 1 =

Comic Relief Does Fame Academy
- Series 1
- Hosted by: Patrick Kielty; Cat Deeley
- Judges: Richard Park; Carrie Grant; David Grant
- Winner: Will Mellor
- Runner-up: Ruby Wax

Release
- Original network: BBC One
- Original release: 7 March – 14 March 2003

Series chronology
- Next → Series 2

The first Comic Relief Does Fame Academy took place on 7 March 2003 and lasted until Red Nose Day on 14 March, where the final show was presented and the winner was announced. It was hosted by Patrick Kielty and Cat Deeley. Nine British celebrities moved into the Fame Academy. Will Mellor was the eventual winner of the show.

== Contestants ==
Celebrity	Known for	Status
Will Mellor	Actor	Winner
Ruby Wax	Comedian/TV presenter	Runner-up
Kwame Kwei-Armah	Actor	Third Place
Doon MacKichan	Actress/Comedian	Eliminated 6th
Ulrika Jonsson	TV and media personality	Eliminated 5th
John Thomson	Actor	Eliminated 4th
Jo Brand	Comedian	Eliminated 3rd
Fearne Cotton	TV presenter	Eliminated 2nd
Paul Ross	TV critic	Eliminated 1st

== Teachers ==
Most of the original Fame Academy teachers were back, including Richard Park, Carrie Grant, and Kevin Adams. David Grant was a newcomer, as a second voice coach.

== Format ==
The same elimination mechanism as the 2002 series, with the teachers putting three on 'probation' each night, with the public saving one and the students the second.

=== Semi-final Twist ===
However, in the 'semi-final' with only three students left the producers decided to change the student vote to include all expelled students as well as the contestant saved by the public. Will, who was saved by the public, voted to save Kwame, while all six of the expelled students voted to save Ruby, changing the lineup of the final two.

== Results and elimination ==
Indicates the winning contestant
Indicates the contestant who was eliminated from the competition
Indicates the contestant who was the Grade A student for the week
Indicates a contestant who was safe, and was neither the Grade A student or facing probation
Indicates a contestant who faced probation, but was saved by the public vote.
Indicates a contestant who faced probation, but was saved by their fellow students
Indicates a contestant who was unable to perform at the live show
Indicates a contestant who was not eliminated from the show, but had to withdraw due to illness
Indicates that the contestant had been eliminated from the show, and was no longer competing at the academy.

	Day 1	Day 2	Day 3	Day 4	Day 5	Day 6	Day 7	Day 8 The Final
Will	Safe	Safe	Probation; Public Vote	Safe	Probation; Public Vote	Probation; Public Vote	Probation; Public Vote	Winner
Ruby	Safe	Safe	Probation; Public Vote	Safe	Safe	Probation; Students vote	Probation; Students vote	Runner-up
Kwame	Safe	Safe	Safe	Probation; Public Vote	Safe	Probation; Public Vote	Eliminated	Eliminated (Day 7)
Doon	Probation; Students vote	Probation; Students vote	Safe	Safe	Probation; Students vote	Eliminated	Eliminated (Week 6)	
Ulrika	Safe	Safe	Safe	Probation; Students vote	Eliminated	Eliminated (Day 5)		
John	Safe	Safe	Probation; Students vote	Eliminated	Eliminated (Day 4)			
Jo	Safe	Probation; Public Vote	Eliminated	Eliminated (Day 3)				
Fearne	Safe	Eliminated	Eliminated (Day 2)					
Paul	Eliminated	Eliminated (Day 1)						
Notes	Note 1		Note 2			Note 3	Note 4	
Probation	Doon, Paul	Doon, Fearne, Jo	Jo, John, Ruby, Will	John, Kwame, Ulrika	Doon, Ulrika, Will	Doon, Kwame, Ruby, Will	Kwame, Ruby, Will	No probation
Eliminated	Paul Ross	Fearne Cotton	Jo Brand	John Thompson	Ulrika Jonsson	Doon Mackichan	Kwame Kwei-Armah	Ruby Wax
Eliminated	Paul Ross	Fearne Cotton	Jo Brand	John Thompson	Ulrika Jonsson	Doon Mackichan	Kwame Kwei-Armah	Will Mellor

Notes:

- Note 1: In the launch show, all contestants faced the public vote, the two with the fewest votes were put on probation and then faced the contestants vote.
- Note 2: Four contestants were put on probation instead of the usual three, with the public saving two.
- Note 3: All four remaining contestants were put on probation with the public saving two.
- Note 4: All three finalists faced probation with the public saving just one, the eliminated contestants returned to participate in the student vote.
