= Comic Relief Does Fame Academy series 2 =

Comic Relief Does Fame Academy
- Series 2
- Hosted by: Patrick Kielty; Cat Deeley
- Judges: Richard Park; Lesley Garrett; Craig Revel Horwood
- Winner: Edith Bowman
- Runner-up: Kim Medcalf

Release
- Original network: BBC One
- Original release: 26 February – 11 March 2005

Series chronology
- ← Previous; Series 1

Comic Relief Does Fame Academy, a spin-off of the original Fame Academy show where celebrities students sing as students of the Academy to help raise money for the charities supported by Comic Relief, returned for a second live airing on 26 February 2005. It was once again hosted by Patrick Kielty and Cat Deeley. During the Comic Relief show on 11 March (Red Nose Day), Edith Bowman was announced as the winner.

== Contestants ==
Celebrity	Known for	Status
Edith Bowman	Presenter/DJ	Winner
Kim Medcalf	Actress	Runner-up
Adrian Edmondson	Actor/Comedian	Third Place
Reggie Yates	Television presenter	Eliminated 10th
Debra Stephenson	Actress/Impressionist	Eliminated 9th
Dawn Steele	Actress	Eliminated 8th
Nick Knowles	TV presenter	Eliminated 7th
Gina Yashere	Comedian	Eliminated 6th
Christopher Colquhoun	Actor	Eliminated 5th
Jon Culshaw	Impressionist	Eliminated 4th
Konnie Huq	Television presenter	Eliminated 3rd
Jenny Eclair	Comedian	Eliminated 2nd
Al Murray	Comedian	Eliminated 1st

== Production and broadcasting ==
The production and broadcasting for the live shows took place at a new location - the former Lambeth College site between Tower Bridge and London City Hall on the south bank of the River Thames. The building had originally been home to St Olave's Grammar School between 1855 and 1967.

== Format ==
The elimination mechanism was the same as the second series proper, however Park no longer had a casting vote in the event of the Judges' vote being tied, with the public vote resolving any deadlock.

== Teachers ==
There were changes for this series. Strictly Come Dancing judge Craig Revel Horwood and opera star Lesley Garrett were brought in as judges. Singing coaches Carrie and David Grant were no longer on the judging panel, but were present during the live shows and were invited to give their views when necessary.

=== Guests ===
The five remaining students were given a masterclass courtesy of McFly, who released All About You as Comic Relief's official single that year.

== Conflict ==
The series had its fair share of drama and conflict.

=== Kielty VS. Park ===
As with series two of the main show, host Patrick Kielty and headteacher Richard Park clashed continually throughout the series. While it was assumed by some that the arguments were staged to build up interest for the show, this appeared to be disproved when Richard Park was spotted making a rude hand gesture towards Patrick Kielty, as co-host Cat Deeley was attempting to introduce the next act. The BBC received over 400 complaints, although Kielty joked about the incident in a subsequent episode. A spokeswoman for the programme said: "Richard Park did not realise he was on camera at the time. It is a live show and tensions were running high but we are really sorry if any offence was caused." [1]

The feud between Kielty and Park spilled over into the press after the show had ended. Park claimed that Kielty's presenting skills had been "sub-standard" and speculated that he would never be seen on BBC screens again. Kielty was later announced as the host of ITV's Celebrity Love Island.

=== Craig Revel Horwood ===
Teachers Carrie and David were also involved in a feud with Craig Revel Horwood. Horwood regularly criticised the performances of the celebrities, particularly Debra Stephenson and Reggie Yates. In one episode of the show, Carrie accused Craig of trying to kill the spirits of the singers.

== Results and elimination ==
Indicates the winning contestant
Indicates the contestant who was eliminated from the competition
Indicates the contestant who was the Grade A student for the week
Indicates a contestant who was safe, and was neither the Grade A student or facing probation
Indicates a contestant who faced probation, but was saved by the public vote.
Indicates a contestant who faced probation, but was saved by their fellow students
Indicates a contestant who was unable to perform at the live show
Indicates a contestant who was not eliminated from the show, but had to withdraw due to illness
Indicates that the contestant had been eliminated from the show, and was no longer competing at the academy.

	Day 1	Day 5	Day 6	Day 7	Day 8	Day 9	Day 10	Day 11	Day 12	Day 13	Day 14 The Final
Edith	Safe	Safe	Safe	Safe	Safe	Safe	Safe	Teachers'; Vote	Safe	Teachers'; Vote	Winner
Kim	Safe	Safe	Safe	Safe	Safe	Safe	Safe	Safe	Safe	Safe	2nd place
Ade	Safe	Safe	Safe	Safe	Safe	Safe	Teachers'; Vote	Safe	Teachers'; Vote	Students'; Vote	3rd place
Reggie	Safe	Students'; Vote	Safe	Students'; Vote	Safe	Students'; Vote	Safe	Students'; Vote	Students'; Vote	Eliminated	Eliminated (Day 13)
Debra	Safe	Safe	Safe	Safe	Safe	Teachers'; Vote	Students'; Vote	Safe	Eliminated	Eliminated (Day 12)	
Dawn	Safe	Safe	Safe	Safe	Teachers'; Vote	Safe	Safe	Eliminated	Eliminated (Day 11)		
Nick	Safe	Safe	Safe	Safe	Safe	Safe	Eliminated	Eliminated (Day 10)			
Gina	Safe	Safe	Teachers'; Vote	Teachers'; Vote	Students'; Vote	Eliminated	Eliminated (Day 9)				
Chris	Safe	Teachers'; Vote	Students'; Vote	Safe	Eliminated	Eliminated (Day 8)					
Jon	Students'; Vote	Safe	Safe	Eliminated	Eliminated (Day 7)						
Konnie	Safe	Safe	Eliminated	Eliminated (Day 6)							
Jenny	Teachers'; Vote	Eliminated	Eliminated (Day 5)								
Al	Eliminated	Eliminated (Day 1)									
Notes											Note 1
Bottom Two	Al, Jon	Jenny, Reggie	Chris, Konnie	Jon, Reggie	Chris, Gina	Gina, Reggie	Debra, Nick	Dawn, Reggie	Debra, Reggie	Ade, Reggie	No probation
Eliminated	Al	Jenny	Konnie	Jon	Chris	Gina	Nick	Dawn	Debra	Reggie	Ade; Kim
Eliminated	Al	Jenny	Konnie	Jon	Chris	Gina	Nick	Dawn	Debra	Reggie	Edith

Notes:

- Note 1: The eliminated students returned to vote.

=== Voting Controversy ===
There was also some speculation that the students were colluding with each other during the student vote to ensure 'close' results. The contestants asked the producers to be excused of the student vote, however the producers refused.

Because of this, many felt the students deliberately invoked a tie when there was only six left, so that the public would have the casting vote. To stop this happening in the semi-final, where a tie was also possible, ex-students also voted (making 11 votes in total, meaning no tie was possible. Therefore one student was put in the final by the public, another by the Judges and the third by the former and current students.
