= Comic Relief Does Fame Academy =

British television talent competition

- Genre: Reality television
- Presented by: BBC One main show: Patrick Kielty; Cat Deeley (2003–2005); Claudia Winkleman (2007); BBC Three coverage: Claudia Winkleman (2003–2005); Dominic Wood (2007); Sarah Cawood (2007); CBBC coverage: Jake Humphrey; Holly Willoughby (2003); Sophie McDonnell (2005); Caroline Flack (2007)
- Judges: Richard Park; Carrie Grant (2003); David Grant (2003); Lesley Garrett (2005–2007); Craig Revel Horwood (2005–2007)
- Country of origin: United Kingdom
- Original language: English
- No. of series: 3
- No. of episodes: 30

Production
- Running time: 60–120 mins
- Production company: Initial

Original release
- Network: BBC One; BBC Three; CBBC Channel
- Release: 7 March 2003 – 16 March 2007

Related
- Fame Academy; Let's Dance for Comic Relief

Comic Relief Does Fame Academy is a spin-off of the original Fame Academy show where celebrities students sing as students of the Academy. The programme was launched in 2003 to help raise money for the charities supported by Comic Relief, with the final of the show occurring on Red Nose Day.

Coverage of the show was widely shown on BBC One, BBC Three, BBC Prime and the CBBC Channel. The series returned in 2005 and again in March 2007. It was announced by the BBC that Cat Deeley would not return because she was hosting So You Think You Can Dance. However, Patrick Kielty returned with co-host and host of the former spin-off show Claudia Winkleman.

== Format ==
Each day, in the two weeks leading up to Comic Relief, the remaining students would perform a song of their choice, with guidance from vocal coaches Carrie Grant and David Grant, to a live national audience. The judges then gave their comments on each performance. After all of the students have sung their songs the voting lines opened for around two hours.

In the results show, the students are told who is safe from the sing-off for that day and the remaining three have to perform their song again. After this the judging panel choose which student they wish to save and return to the Academy. Of the remaining two left, the students then vote who they want to stay with them in the Academy and the remaining student is eliminated from the competition.

During their time at the Academy the students are given vocal lessons by Carrie Grant and husband David Grant, whilst Kevin Adams leads the dance classes. Richard Park is the "headmaster".

== Series overview ==
Series	Start	Finish	Winner	Runner-up	Third place	Presenters	Judges
1	7 March 2003	11 March 2003	Will Mellor	Ruby Wax	Kwame Kwei-Armah	Patrick Kielty; Cat Deeley	Richard Park; Carrie Grant; David Grant
2	26 February 2005	11 March 2005	Edith Bowman	Kim Medcalf	Adrian Edmondson	Patrick Kielty; Cat Deeley	Richard Park; Carrie Grant; David Grant
3	3 March 2007	16 March 2007	Tara Palmer-Tomkinson	Tricia Penrose	Shaun Williamson	Patrick Kielty; Claudia Winkleman	Richard Park; Lesley Garrett; Craig Revel Horwood

== Series 1 (2003) ==
The first live show took place on 7 March 2003 and lasted until Red Nose Day on 14 March, where the final show was presented and the winner was announced. Nine British celebrities moved into the Fame Academy.

The celebrities were (in order of elimination):

- Paul Ross
- Fearne Cotton
- Jo Brand
- John Thomson
- Ulrika Jonsson
- Doon Mackichan (a late replacement for David Ginola, who dropped out just before filming)
- Kwame Kwei-Armah
- Ruby Wax
- Will Mellor (Winner)

Most of the original Fame Academy teachers were back, including Richard Park, Carrie Grant, and Kevin Adams. David Grant was a newcomer, as a second voice coach.

The same elimination mechanism as the 2002 series, with the teachers putting three on 'probation' each night, with the public saving one and the students the second. However, in the 'semi-final' with only three students left the producers decided to change the student vote to include all expelled students as well as the contestant saved by the public. Will, who was saved by the public, voted to save Kwame, while all six of the expelled students voted to save Ruby, changing the lineup of the final two.

Will was the eventual winner of the show.

== Series 2 (2005) ==
On 26 February 2005, Comic Relief Does Fame Academy returned for a second live airing. The production and broadcasting for the live shows took place at a new location on the south bank of the River Thames, the former Lambeth College site between Tower Bridge and London City Hall and was originally home to St Olave's Grammar School between 1855 and 1967.

The celebrities that took part were, in order of elimination:

- Al Murray
- Jenny Eclair
- Konnie Huq
- Jon Culshaw
- Christopher Colquhoun
- Gina Yashere
- Nick Knowles
- Dawn Steele
- Debra Stephenson
- Reggie Yates
- Adrian Edmondson (3rd)
- Kim Medcalf (2nd)
- Edith Bowman (Winner)

There were changes for this series. Strictly Come Dancing judge Craig Revel Horwood and opera star Lesley Garrett were brought in as judges. Singing coaches Carrie and David Grant were no longer on the judging panel, but were present during the live shows and were invited to give their views when necessary.

The elimination mechanism was the same as the second series proper, however Park no longer had a casting vote in the event of the Judges' vote being tied, with the public vote resolving any deadlock.

The five remaining students were given a masterclass courtesy of McFly, who released "All About You" as Comic Relief's official single that year.

The series had its fair share of drama and conflict. As with series two of the main show, host Patrick Kielty and headteacher Richard Park clashed continually throughout the series. While it was assumed by some that the arguments were staged to build up interest for the show, this appeared to be disproved when Richard Park was spotted making a rude hand gesture towards Patrick Kielty, as co-host Cat Deeley was attempting to introduce the next act. The BBC received over 400 complaints, although Kielty joked about the incident in a subsequent episode. A spokeswoman for the programme said: "Richard Park did not realise he was on camera at the time. It is a live show and tensions were running high but we are really sorry if any offence was caused."

The feud between Kielty and Park spilled over into the press after the show had ended. Park claimed that Kielty's presenting skills had been "sub-standard" and speculated that he would never be seen on BBC screens again. Kielty was later announced as the host of ITV's Celebrity Love Island.

Teachers Carrie and David were also involved in a feud with Craig Revel Horwood. Horwood regularly criticised the performances of the celebrities, particularly Debra Stephenson and Reggie Yates. In one episode of the show, Carrie accused Craig of trying to kill the spirits of the singers.

There was also some speculation that the students were colluding with each other during the student vote to ensure 'close' results. The contestants asked the producers to be excused of the student vote, however the producers refused.

Because of this, many felt the students deliberately invoked a tie when there was only six left, so that the public would have the casting vote. To stop this happening in the semi-final, where a tie was also possible, ex-students also voted (making 11 votes in total, meaning no tie was possible. Therefore, one student was put in the final by the public, another by the Judges and the third by the former and current students.

During the Comic Relief show on 11 March (Red Nose Day), Edith Bowman was announced as the winner. The runner-up was Kim Medcalf and in third place Adrian Edmondson.

== Series 3 (2007) ==
The third series of Comic Relief Does Fame Academy launched on 3 March and continued nightly from 7 to 16 March (Red Nose Day).

=== Hosts ===
Regular host Patrick Kielty was joined by Claudia Winkleman who moved over from BBC Three, to replace Cat Deeley and preside over the live event from Fame Academy's new venue, the Debating Chamber in County Hall, London. Caroline Flack replaced Sophie McDonnell (who replaced Holly Willoughby in 2005) and joined Jake Humphrey for CBBC's coverage of Fame Academy. The BBC Three coverage was hosted by Sarah Cawood and Dominic Wood. Cat Deeley's exit was down to her 'golden handcuffs' contract presenting So You Think You Can Dance in the United States.

The Celebrities that took part were, in order of elimination:

- Rowland Rivron
- Miranda Hart
- Linda Robson
- Tim Vine
- Zöe Salmon
- Mel Giedroyc
- Fred MacAulay
- Angellica Bell
- Ray Stubbs
- Colin Murray
- Shaun Williamson (3rd)
- Tricia Penrose (2nd)
- Tara Palmer-Tomkinson (Winner)

=== Judges ===
- Richard Park - Head Teacher / Judge
- Lesley Garrett CBE
- Craig Revel Horwood

=== Tutors ===
- Kevin Adams - Fitness Coach
- Jeremy Milnes - Personal Tutor
- Richard Park - Head Teacher / Judge
- Carrie Grant - Vocal Coach
- David Grant - Vocal Coach

=== Live launch night ===
On the live launch night, the celebrities sang one song each to the usual judging panel; Craig Revel Horwood, Lesley Garrett and Richard Park. The viewers' vote left Angellica Bell, Miranda Hart and Rowland Rivron in the "bottom three". All three celebrities sang their song for a second time, and the judges were asked to save one of them. Both Craig and Richard saved Angellica, while Lesley saved Miranda, which meant that Angellica was through to the next stage of the competition. The eleven "safe" celebrities were then asked to vote to save either Miranda or Rowland. Miranda received ten votes, while Rowland only received one. Rowland, who showed off fake breasts during his performance of "Stand By Your Man," became the first evicted celebrity of the series. Colin Murray, the only celebrity to vote for Rowland, said that the Academy needed more men in it, otherwise "everyone would be talking about Sex and the City all the time."

== See also ==
- Comic Relief Does The Apprentice
