= Malakai =

Malakai may refer to:

== People ==
- Variant spelling of the name of the Hebrew prophet Malachi
- Malakai Black (born 1985), ring name of Dutch professional wrestler Tom Büdgen
- Malakai Fakatoufifita, styled Lord Tuʻilakepa, Tongan noble, politician, and Member of the Legislative Assembly of Tonga
- Malakai Fekitoa (born 1992), Tongan born New Zealand rugby union player
- Malakai Kaunivalu, Fijian rugby league player
- Malakai Mars (born 1998), English footballer
- Malakai Ravulo (born 1983), Fijian rugby union player
- Malakai Tiwa (born 1986), Fiji footballer

== Entertainment ==
- Earlier name of Malachai, a two-piece band from Bristol, England
- Malakai Makaisson, a dwarf character in Warhammer Fantasy
- Malakai (a.k.a. #4 D.E.O.S. Malakai), AI space probe from the game Dark Fall II: Lights Out

== Other ==
- Variant transliteration of Malahai (Russian: Малаха́й, Kazakh: Малақай), a historical headgear originated in Central Asia
- Malakai, a variant spelling of Malakal, a town in Upper Nile, South Sudan

== See also ==
- Malachi (disambiguation)
- Malachy (disambiguation)
- Malachai (disambiguation)
