= Just Say You Love Me =

Single by Malachi

from the album Malachi
- Released: April 7, 2003
- Recorded: 2003
- Genre: Pop
- Label: UMTV
- Songwriter(s): Malachi Cush, Cliff Masterson, Nigel Lowis
- Producer(s): Cliff Masterson, Nigel Lowis

"Just Say You Love Me" is a song written by Fame Academy contestant Malachi Cush, Cliff Masterson and Nigel Lowis in 2003. The song was included on Malachi's eponymous debut album and was released as a single on 7 April 2003. The single charted at number 49 in the UK Singles Chart and spent only one week in the charts. It is one of the lowest charting official releases from Fame Academy contestants.

As of 2009 this is the only single that Malachi has released, although he has produced several albums.

== Track listing ==
1. "Just Say You Love Me"
2. "Eyes of Blue"
3. "Nothing Ever Happens"

== Chart positions ==
Chart (2003)	Peak position
UK Singles Chart	49

== See also ==
- List of music releases from Fame Academy contestants
