= Malachi (album) =

Studio album by Malachi
- Released: March 24, 2003
- Recorded: 2003
- Genre: Pop
- Label: Mercury
- Producer: Various

Malachi is the debut album released by Fame Academy contestant Malachi Cush. The album was released on 24 March 2003 and features his debut single "Just Say You Love Me", along with some cover versions that he performed on Fame Academy. The album reached number 17 in the UK Album Chart in April 2003.

== Track listing ==
All lyrics are written by Malachi Cush; all music is composed by Malachi Cush.

No.	Title	Length
1.	"I Don't Know Why" (written by Shawn Colvin)
2.	"Fields of Gold" (written by Sting)
3.	"Just Say You Love Me"
4.	"All I Want Is You" (written by U2)
5.	"Baby I'm A Want You" (written by David Gates)
6.	"Amazed"
7.	"Have I Told You Lately" (written by Van Morrison)
8.	"Eyes of Blue"
9.	"A Man Is In Love" (with Caliope House)
10.	"The Dance" (written by Garth Brooks)
11.	"Vincent" (written by Don McLean)
12.	"Something" (written by George Harrison)	5:03
13.	"How Can I Tell You?" (written by Cat Stevens)
14.	"First of May" (written by The Bee Gees)
15.	"You're the One" (written by Shane MacGowan; featuring Sinéad Quinn)
16.	"Shenandoah" (traditional song)

== Chart performance ==
The album reached number 17 in the UK Album Chart in April 2003 but only remained in the top 40 for one week.

Chart (2003)	Peak position
Irish Albums (IRMA)	72
Scottish Albums (OCC)	15
UK Albums (OCC)	17

== See also ==
- List of music releases from Fame Academy contestants
