= Debatable =

Debatable typically refers to something able to be debated. It is also sometimes used as a synonym for moot.

It may also refer to:

- Debatable, a television quiz show on the BBC
