= Dan Gordon (actor) =

Northern Irish actor, director and playwright

- Born: Adrian Gordon; 1961; Belfast, Northern Ireland
- Occupations: Actor; director; playwright
- Years active: 1981–present
- Spouse: Cathy Gordon (m. 1984)
- Children: Three daughters

Dan Gordon (born 1961) is an actor, director and playwright from Belfast, Northern Ireland.

== Early life ==
Gordon was born in Belfast in 1961, the son of David, a shipyard worker, and Irene. He was educated at Sydenham Infants and Strand Primary (later renamed Victoria Primary) and Sullivan Upper School in Holywood where he developed his interest in acting. He trained as a teacher at Stranmillis University College where he read English and Drama.

Gordon left teaching and worked part-time at the Lyric Theatre in Belfast.

== Career ==
He is best known in Northern Ireland for his portrayal of Red Hand Luke in the BBC Northern Ireland sitcom Give My Head Peace. He starred in the Marie Jones monodrama A Night in November at the Tricycle Theatre in London and again in the Lyric Theatre in Belfast. The production played Off-Broadway in 1998 and Gordon was nominated for an Outer Critics Circle Award for Outstanding Solo Performance.

He has also worked in dramas on BBC Radio 3 and BBC Radio 4, and is a columnist for the Belfast newspaper Sunday Life. In 2004 he won BBC Northern Ireland Drama's first ever radio drama competition.

In 2009, he staged a self-written play about the Harland and Wolff Shipyards in Belfast. All the Queen's Men received its premiere in an East Belfast church, known locally as the Shipyard Church. Now known as The Boat Factory, the play toured "unusual" venues during October 2010. The production played at the Edinburgh Festival in 2012 and the following year played in New York at the 59E59 Theatre as part of the 2013 Brits Off Broadway season. The production also played at the King's Head Theatre, Islington, and at Theatre Clwyd, Mold, with Gordon nominated for the 2016 Offie for Best Actor.

In 2015 Gordon appeared in God of Carnage at Belfast MAC, The Shadow of a Gunman at the Abbey Theatre in Dublin, and Christmas Eve Can Kill You by Marie Jones at the Lyric Theatre Belfast. Christmas Eve Can Kill You was the most successful play produced by the Lyric Theatre to date, breaking all box office records.

Gordon played Rab in the second series of BBC One police drama Blue Lights in 2024 and the fourth series in 2026.

In 2026, he appeared in the Lyric Theatre once again, playing Ebenzer Scrooge in the Lyric Theatre's adaptation of A Christmas Carol, directed by Matthew McElhinney.

== Personal life ==
He and his wife, Cathy, who married in November 1984, have three daughters: Sarah, Hannah and Martha.
