= Malachi (disambiguation) =

Malachi was a Jewish prophet in the Hebrew Bible.

Malachi may also refer to:

== People ==
- Malachi (given name)
- Malachi Cush (born 1980), Irish singer who records under the mononym Malachi
- John Malachi (1919–1987), American jazz pianist
- Malachi Malasgrowther, a pseudonym used by writer Walter Scott in a series of letters to the Edinburgh Weekly Journal
- Prince Malachi (born 1969), English reggae singer
- Tau Malachi (born 1962), American neo-Gnostic religious leader

== Arts and entertainment ==
- Malachi (album), debut album of Malachi Cush

== Other uses ==
- Book of Malachi, a book of the Hebrew Bible
- Malachi, Ontario, Canada, an unincorporated community

== See also ==
- Malachy (given name)
- Malachai (disambiguation)
