= I Can't Break Down =

2003 single by Sinéad Quinn

Single by Sinéad Quinn

from the album Ready to Run
- B-side: "Don't Speak"; "I Try" (acoustic)
- Released: 10 February 2003
- Length: 3:31
- Label: Mercury
- Songwriters: Sinéad Quinn; Pete Glenister; Deni Lew
- Producers: Pete Glenister; Deni Lew

Sinéad Quinn singles chronology
"I Can't Break Down" (2003)	"What You Need Is..." (2003)

"I Can't Break Down" is a song written by Sinéad Quinn, Pete Glenister, and Deni Lew for Quinn's debut album, Ready to Run (2003). Produced by Glenister and Lew, it was released as her debut single from the album in February 2003 and reached a peak of number two on the UK Singles Chart. It finished at number 65 on the UK year-end chart for 2003.

== Background and writing ==
Quinn finished as the runner-up in the first series of Fame Academy behind David Sneddon, who had a number-one single with "Stop Living the Lie" in January 2003. She signed a record deal with Mercury Records a week after the final and revealed that she would release her debut single on 10 February 2003.

The song was written by Quinn during her time on Fame Academy. Fame Academy differed from the similar Pop Idol in that the contestants were able to develop their all-round musical talents and write original material during their time on the show. In an interview with the BBC she revealed how her experience on Fame Academy had changed her music style for this song. She said "Before I went in, I wouldn't have been into commercial stuff...my tunes might not have been so radio-friendly, but I'm working on it. I wouldn't have got that much of a hook into my songs. I think the hook is very important."

== Critical reception ==
The song received mixed reviews from music critics. Michael Hubbard (writing for musicOMH) described Quinn's voice as "rich" in comparison to her vocal performance on Fame Academy but commented "if Sinéad wants a career that is more than a flash in the pan, she's going to have to get a lot more dangerous than this". He did, however, commend her for avoiding being like a "karaoke star-turn of the genre's lesser programmes."

== Track listings ==
UK CD single

1. "I Can't Break Down
2. "Don't Speak"
3. "I Try" (acoustic)

UK cassette single

1. "I Can't Break Down"
2. "I Try" (acoustic)

== Charts ==
=== Weekly charts ===
Chart (2003)	Peak position
Europe (Eurochart Hot 100)	10
Ireland (IRMA)	11
Scottish Singles Sales (Official Charts)	1
UK Singles (Official Charts)	2

=== Year-end charts ===
Chart (2003)	Position
UK Singles (OCC)	65
