= Ainslie Henderson =

- Born: 28 January 1979 (age 47)
- Origin: Edinburgh, Scotland
- Genres: Acoustic, alternative, indie rock
- Years active: 2001–present
- Labels: Mercury Records (2003), Amphibian Husbandry
- Formerly of: Suburbia

Ainslie Thomas Henderson (born 28 January 1979) is a Scottish animator and singer-songwriter. He gained fame via his participation in the BBC's television programme, Fame Academy, in 2002. He signed a recording contract with Mercury Records after leaving the show, having been placed fourth. His subsequent single, "Keep Me a Secret", written alongside fellow contestants in Fame Academy, reached the fifth position on the UK Singles Chart.

In 2006, Henderson independently released his debut album, Growing Flowers by Candlelight, which consisted of indie rock and acoustic songs. In promotion of the album, he embarked on a series of live music shows in the UK throughout 2007 and 2008. In the same year, Henderson starred in the short film Mono, directed by British screenwriter Richard Smith.

In 2009, Henderson took a break from music and attended the Edinburgh College of Art, where he met future collaborator Will Anderson. In 2011, the two collaborated on documentary animated film The Making of Longbird, for which Henderson co-wrote and animated. The film went on to win a BAFTA for Short Animation in 2013.

Since then, Henderson has worked on both solo and collaborative projects. His graduation film, I Am Tom Moody (2012), received a BAFTA Award nomination in 2014. In 2014, Henderson collaborated with Anderson on animation short film Monkey Love Experiments, which went on to win a BAFTA Scotland Award in 2014 and receive a BAFTA Award nomination in 2015. Henderson also animated a music video for the single "Moving On" by the band James.

In 2015, Henderson collaborated with Anderson on short film Stems as a director, together with British composer Poppy Ackroyd, which earned a BAFTA Scotland Award. In 2019, Henderson directed stop motion short film Archie. In 2022, Henderson co-wrote and directed the documentary film A Cat Called Dom with Anderson. Henderson's 2023 film, again in collaboration with Anderson and Ackroyd, was nominated for a BAFTA Scotland Award.

Henderson mostly works with the stop-motion medium, with materials such as plasticine.

== Career ==
=== 1998-2001: Career beginnings ===
In 1998, Henderson started Scottish rock band Suburbia with bass player Alasdair Crooks. Henderson acted as Suburbia's main vocalist, with guitarist Peter Deane (then replaced by Chris Plews in early 1999), and drum player Simon Usher. Suburbia caught the attention of major American recording labels such as Capitol Records, Interscope Records and RCA Records before eventually securing a recording contract with record label City of Angels based in Los Angeles. This introduced Suburbia to collaborators such as Tony Visconnti and Scott Litt. During the course of Suburbia's activity, Henderson lauded as a "storm-voiced troubadour" by The List's Sarah Dempster, who "command[ed] total attention" by Southern Reporter's Sarah Williamson.

When City of Angels stopped releasing, Suburbia split in March 2002 on amicable terms. One of their songs, "Always", appeared on the soundtrack of football simulation video game, FIFA Football 2004, after the band's split two years ago. Suburbia did not yield a full studio album despite having announced a work-in-progress album titled "Anyone can be anyone" which consisted of six songs. The album was described to be surrounded by themes of coming-of-age and teenage angst. Suburbia saw their sole official release in the form of a 4-track self-titled extended play that included demo versions of songs meant for their album. After his Fame Academy stint, Henderson considered having Suburbia members act as his touring band.

=== 2002-2003: Fame Academy and Keep Me A Secret ===
After the split of Suburbia, Henderson lived in London as an unemployed songwriter and had deferred his entry into Edinburgh University for six years. He then auditioned for and appeared in the first series of the BBC talent/reality show Fame Academy, which incorporated an elimination system that allowed both viewers and participants to vote for a contestant to be eliminated. During his time participating in the show, Henderson wrote "Keep Me a Secret" with fellow contestants Malachi Cush and Sinéad Quinn and "Take Out Time" with Mark Hunter and Saul Davies of James, as well as co-writing "Lullaby" with contestant Lemar Obika. All three tracks would later reach the top 5 in the UK Singles Chart, the latter two as B-sides. Henderson was voted off the show in the penultimate week, coming fourth.

After his departure from the show, he was signed to Mercury and, in March 2003, released a solo single of "Keep Me a Secret" with "Take Out Time" as the B-side, which entered the UK Singles Chart at No. 5.

Henderson became unhappy with the direction his musical career was taking with Mercury. In late 2003, before releasing the album or a second single, Henderson was dropped. Although he was allowed to retain the rights of the songs he had already written and recorded, they have never been released. He revealed one track, "Coming Up for Air", on his MySpace profile in 2006. This has since been released officially on Amazon music.

=== 2004-2005: The Last September ===
In 2004, Henderson visited the US to collaborate with the American singer-songwriter Jason Mraz, co-writing the song "Clockwatching" which appears on Mraz's album, Mr. A-Z.

Later that year, Henderson returned to his home city, joining the rock band The Last September as guitarist and backing vocalist, along with his friend Pete Deane from Suburbia. They performed in London and at several venues in Scotland. He left The Last September in 2005.

=== 2006-2010: Growing Flowers by Candlelight and collaborations ===
After a three-year break from his solo career, Henderson revealed new material to the public for the first time with the creation of a Myspace profile in early 2006, featuring new tracks "Day Trip" and "While They Wait". He performed a number of new songs whilst supporting Unkle Bob on several gigs around central Scotland in the following months. Henderson released his debut album, Growing Flowers by Candlelight, on 15 July 2006 via his own label, Amphibian Husbandry.

In 2007, Henderson starred as Jay opposite actor Samantha Young in the short film Mono, directed by British screenwriter Richard Smith.

In May 2007, Henderson supported Marillion on two dates during their UK tour.

In 2013, he worked with Shane Filan in Ireland.

=== 2011-present: Filmmaking ===
While taking pottery lessons to create mugs out of clay in promotion of Growing Flowers by Candlelight, Henderson was inspired to pursue sculpture and figure-making. In 2009, Henderson took a break from releasing music and attended the Edinburgh College of Art to pursue a Bachelor of Arts degree in animation, graduating in 2012. As a student, Henderson met his frequent creative collaborator, Will Anderson, who was taking the same course albeit graduating a year earlier. Anderson was described to have a larger focus in digital animation, while Henderson was more familiar with stop-motion animation.

In 2011, Henderson made a short animation feature titled It's About Spending Time Together as a student, which recounted a childhood experience and acted as an apology to his younger brother. It went on to win a British Academy Scotland New Talent Awards. Henderson co-wrote The Making of Longbird with Anderson, which was a documentary-style film that blended elements of live action and animation. The film was awarded BAFTA Award for Best Short Animation in 2013.

In 2012, Henderson created animated short film I Am Tom Moody as his graduation film about a musician's struggle in overcoming his childhood fear of singing. The film employed surrealist elements, with actor Mackenzie Crook and his son Jude Crook voicing the eponymous character's adult and young selves respectively. I Am Tom Moody was nominated for a BAFTA Award for Best Short Animation in 2014.

Henderson worked with Anderson on a series of short comedy animations involving pigeons and other poultry animals published on YouTube throughout 2011 to 2014. The pair contributed to the voice acting of the series. Most notably, the short Scroogin on a Greg has amassed more than a hundred thousand views.

In 2014, Henderson created the animated music video of James' single "Moving On", having previously worked on his song "Take Out Time" with James members a decade ago. The music video of "Moving On" was made in stop-motion with yellow yarn as the main material, addressing themes of grief and acceptance as a loved one is lost, metaphorically represented by the unwinding of yarn. The video won the award for Best Animation in a Video at the 2014 UK Music Video Awards.

In 2015, Henderson co-wrote and directed Monkey Love Experiments with Anderson. The short film is inspired by NASA's experiments involving monkeys and American psychologist Harry Harlow's experiments with primates. It saw a mix between Henderson's stop-motion and Anderson's digital animation skills, with stylistic choices such as a 4:3 aspect ratio and monochromatic colors. Monkey Love Experiments received a BAFTA nomination for Best Short Animation in 2015. Henderson directed Stems, a 2-minute short film on the puppet-making and the nature of puppets in stop-motion animation, featuring music by Poppy Ackroyd. Strems earned a BAFTA Scotland Award.

Henderson had an acting role in Scotland-based director Rory Alexander Stewart's 2017 short film Wild Horses as Bruno, a writing tutor of the main character Joan, starring alongside actors Emma Curtis and Emma Cater. Wild Horses covers the main character's myalgic encephalopathy and her quest for independence, drawing from Stewart's own friend's experience with the illness. It was selected for Cannes film festival's Cinéfondation emerging talent category along 15 other films out of 2600 entries.

In 2019, Henderson directed short film Archie, in which the eponymous character travels to Outer Hebrides of Scotland with his pet dog upon learning about his aunt's death. Archie won the Best of the Fest award at Chicago International Children's Film Festival.

In 2022, Henderson and Anderson released A Cat Called Dom, for which Henderson acted as a co-director and co-writer. A Cat Called Dom is a documentary that stars Henderson and Anderson in live-action sequences, combined with animated shots of the eponymous character Dom. Dom, a personification of cancer, is used as a narrative device to document Anderson's experience coping with his mother's cancer diagnosis. The documentary had been in the works for several years and is dedicated to Anderson's mother. Initially conceived as a solely animated film, it face trouble being complete in the process before the duo eventually decided to turn it into a documentary about filmmaking and their failure along the process.

In 2023, Henderson created short film Shackle centered around the journey of three woodland spirits, which Henderson worked on for three years. It includes music contributions by Ackroyd and is produced by Anderson. Shackle was included in Edinburgh International Film Festival's official 2023 selection. It was nominated for a BAFTA Scotland Short Film & Animation award in 2023.

In 2025, Henderson contributed to British band Coldplay's A Film for the Future alongside more than 150 artists. The film served as a visual companion to Coldplay's 2024 album Moon Music.

== Filmography ==
=== Films ===
Year	Title	Role	Notes	Ref.
2007	Mono	Jay	Actor	
2011	It's About Spending Time Together	—	Director; Animator	
2011	The Making of Longbird	—	Co-writer	
2012	I am Tom Moody	—	Director; Writer; Animator	
2015	Monkey Love Experiments	—	Co-writer; Director	
2015	Stems	—	Director	
2017	Wild Horses	Bruno	Actor	
2019	Archie	—	Director	
2020	As We Go	—	Director; Producer; Editor	
2020	Xmas is Cancelled	—	Director; Producer	
2022	A Cat Called Dom	—	Co-writer; Director	
2023	One Day	—	Director; Writer; Animator	
2023	Shackle	—	Director; Writer; Animator	
2024	One Little Thing	—	Director; Writer; Animator	
2025	A Film for the Future	—	Director	

=== Television ===
Year	Title	Role	Notes	Ref.
2002	Fame Academy	Himself	9 episodes	
2015	OOglies	—	Writer; 20 episodes	
2018	The State of It	—	Writer; 4 episodes	

=== Web ===
Year	Title	Role	Notes	Ref.
2012	Scroogin on a Greg	Pigeon	Writer; Voice	

=== Music videos ===
Year	Title	Role	Notes	Ref.
2003	Keep Me a Secret	Himself	Musical artist	
2014	Moving On	—	Director; music by James	
2014	This Train Remains	—	Director; music by The Last September	

== Discography ==
=== Albums ===
- Growing Flowers by Candlelight (July 2006), Amphibian Husbandry

=== Singles ===
- "Keep Me a Secret" (March 2003), Mercury: reached no. 5 in the UK
- "Coming Up for Air" (June 2007), Amphibian Husbandry
