= Ready to Run (album) =

Studio album by Sinéad Quinn
- Released: 14 July 2003
- Recorded: 2003
- Genre: Pop rock
- Label: Mercury
- Producer: Pete Glenister; Deni Lew; Glenn Skinner

Ready to Run is the only album by former Fame Academy contestant Sinéad Quinn. It was poorly received and charted at No. 48 on the UK Albums Chart, which led to her being dropped by her record label.

== Track listing ==
1. "What You Need Is..." - 3:31 (Sinéad Quinn, Pete Glenister, Deni Lew)
2. "Never Happy" - 3:39 (Quinn, Glenister, Lew)
3. "Don't Give It Up Girl" - 3:31 (Quinn, Glenister, Lew)
4. "Ready To Run" - 4:17 (Quinn, Glenister, Lew)
5. "I Can't Break Down" - 3:31 (Quinn, Glenister, Lew)
6. "Fire Me Up" - 3:38 (Quinn, Tore Johansson)
7. "Small Town Big Dreams" - 4:10 (Quinn, Glenister, Lew)
8. "I'm Worth It" - 4:30 (Quinn, Glenister, Lew)
9. "Overkill" - 3:45 (Quinn, Glenister, Lew)
10. "Lucky Escape" - 4:03 (Quinn, Glenister, Lew)
11. "Love Me All The Way" - 3:59 (Quinn, Phil Thornalley, Dave Munday)
12. "Safe Hands" - 3:08 (Quinn, Phil Thornalley, Dave Munday)

== Charts ==
Chart (2003)	Peak position
UK Albums Chart	48
