= Fame Academy series 1 =

Season of television series

Fame Academy
- Series 1
- Hosted by: Patrick Kielty; Cat Deeley
- Judges: Richard Park; Carrie Grant; David Grant; Robin Gibb
- Winner: David Sneddon
- Runner-up: Sinéad Quinn

Release
- Original network: BBC One
- Original release: 4 October – 13 December 2002

Series chronology
- Next → Series 2

The first series of Fame Academy, a BBC reality talent search, was first broadcast in the United Kingdom over ten weeks in October - December 2002. It was won by David Sneddon. The live shows were presented by Cat Deeley and Patrick Kielty.

== Format ==
Eleven previously selected contestants were showcased to the nation in the first live episode, while the first viewer vote of the series was announced in a surprise twist - three other potential finalists would be showcased to the nation - and the public could vote for whom they wanted to enter the Academy, making up the final line-up of twelve contestants.

On the Tuesday of each week, the teachers would gather the contestants, and inform them of their progress. The contestant who had impressed the judges the most over the previous week would be named the "Grade A student," and would be guaranteed a solo performance at the following live show. The three contestants who the judges felt were performing the worst would be put on probation, and would have to sing for survival live on Friday night on BBC One, in order to fight for their place in the Academy. When applicable, the contestants who were neither on probation, or the Grade A students would team up for the live show, performing as groups, or on occasion in duets. Although they were safe from elimination, their performances in their groups weighed heavily on the teachers decision on whom to put up for probation in the following week.

Following all of the performances on the Friday live show, the public would vote for the student up for probation who they wanted to save - the person with the most votes would be safe. However, the fate of the two other contestants on probation was decided by their fellow contestants, who had to vote for who they wanted to save. In the event of a tie in the student vote the public votes would decide who is eliminated. All four contestants were put on probation in the penultimate week, with the public saving two.

Guest teachers were brought in to "teach", this happened periodically throughout the series, the guest teachers included Lionel Richie (who also co-wrote a song on the Fame Academy album), Shania Twain, Mariah Carey and Ronan Keating.

The Friday night live shows were filmed in front of an audience at the BBC's Shepperton Studios, and were lavishly presented. They featured duets and group performances by all the students which were choreographed by dance teacher Kevin Adams, as well as the songs by the three probation students. The guest teachers also sang on the liveshow. In the case of Lionel Richie he performed twice, returning to duet with Lemar on their co-written song "Back To You".

As well as the live shows, highlight shows aired at 7pm on Tuesday and Thursday nights on BBC One. A late night uncut show was later added to the schedules. Extra coverage was shown on BBC Choice, with round-the-clock live streaming also available on BBCi and Freeview.

=== Students ===
Eleven of these contestants were pre-selected and then the public voted in the twelfth, Sinéad Quinn. This made the final line-up, until Naomi fell ill and was forced to withdraw from the competition, she was replaced by eventual winner David Sneddon who had received the second highest number of votes to enter the academy after Sinéad.

The contestants' time in the Academy included singing lessons with Carrie Grant, exhausting dance and exercise classes with Kevin Adams, and song-writing lessons with Pam Sheyne who co-wrote Christina Aguilera's hit single Genie in a Bottle, and Grammy nominated Steve DuBerry who wrote Tina Turner's hit "I Don't Wanna Fight" (plus hits for Joe Cocker, Simon Webbe, Liberty X) Music coach Jo Noel (Jo Carter) assisted with Musical knowledge and accompaniment on the piano. Headteacher Richard Park was also never far away, and managed to keep order for most of the series.

As well as the dramas of singing for survival, there were dramas among the contestants too. David and Ainslie were claimed to be rivals for most of the series. Katie almost got thrown out of the Academy as a punishment for damaging equipment during a water fight she instigated. Camilla and Lemar got closer and closer, until on the night when all of the contestants returned to the house, they kissed in one of the bedrooms. Sinéad and Malachi were also very close, but a relationship failed to materialise once they left the Academy.

Each week, the teachers were given the task of putting three of the students on 'probation,' where they would be forced to sing for their survival the following Friday, with one of the 3 being saved by the public. The final 2 performers fate was then left to the other students, who would decide who stayed and who left the Academy for good.

== Results summary ==
Indicates the winning contestant
Indicates the contestant who was eliminated from the competition
Indicates the contestant who was the Grade A student for the week
Indicates a contestant who was safe, and was neither the Grade A student or facing probation
Indicates a contestant who faced probation, but was saved by the public vote.
Indicates a contestant who faced probation, but was saved by their fellow students
Indicates a contestant who did not perform at the live show
Indicates a contestant who was not eliminated from the show, but had to withdraw due to illness
Indicates that the contestant had been eliminated from the show, and was no longer competing at the academy.

| | Week 1 | Week 2 | Week 3 | Week 4 | Week 5 | Week 6 | Week 7 | Week 8 | Week 9 | Week 10 The Final | |
|---|---|---|---|---|---|---|---|---|---|---|---|
| David Sneddon | Not In; Competition | Safe | Probation; Public Vote | Safe | Grade A Student | Safe | Probation; Public Vote | Safe | Probation; Public Vote | Safe | Winner |
| Sinéad Quinn | Safe | Safe | Safe | Grade A Student | Safe | Grade A Student | Safe | Probation; Public Vote | Probation; Public Vote | Safe | Runner Up |
| Lemar Obika | Safe | Grade A Student | Safe | Safe | Safe | Safe | Safe | Safe | Probation; Students Vote | Eliminated | Eliminated (Week 10) |
| Ainslie Henderson | Safe | Safe | Grade A Student | Safe | Safe | Safe | Probation; Students Vote | Probation; Students Vote | Eliminated | Eliminated (Week 9) | |
| Malachi Cush | Safe | Safe | Safe | Safe | Probation; Students Vote | Probation; Public Vote | Safe | Eliminated | Eliminated (Week 8) | | |
| Katie Lewis | Safe | Probation; Students Vote | Probation; Students Vote | Probation; Students Vote | Probation; Public Vote | Probation; Students Vote | Eliminated | Eliminated (Week 7) | | | |
| Nigel Wilson | Probation; Public Vote | Safe | Safe | Probation; Public Vote | Safe | Eliminated | Eliminated (Week 6) | | | | |
| Marli Buck | Grade A Student | Safe | Safe | Safe | Eliminated | Eliminated (Week 5) | | | | | |
| Pippa Fulton | Probation; Students Vote | Probation; Public Vote | Safe | Eliminated | Eliminated (Week 4) | | | | | | |
| Camilla Beeput | Safe | Safe | Eliminated | Eliminated (Week 3) | | | | | | | |
| Chris Manning | Safe | Eliminated | Eliminated (Week 2) | | | | | | | | |
| Naomi Roper | Awarded bye due to illness | Withdrew (Week 2) | | | | | | | | | |
| Ashley House | Eliminated | Eliminated (Week 1) | | | | | | | | | |
| Notes | Note 1 Note 2 | Note 3 | | | | Note 4 Note 5 | | Note 6 | Note 7 | Note 8 | |
| Probation | Ashley; Nigel; Pippa | Chris; Katie; Pippa | Camilla; David; Katie | Katie; Nigel; Pippa | Katie; Malachi; Marli | Katie; Malachi; Nigel | Ainslie; David; Katie | Ainslie; Malachi; Sinéad | Ainslie; David; Lemar; Sinéad | No probation | |
| Eliminated | Ashley House | Chris Manning | Camilla Beeput | Pippa Fulton | Marli Buck | Nigel Wilson | Katie Lewis | Malachi Cush | Ainslie Henderson | Lemar Obika | Sinéad Quinn |
| Eliminated | Ashley House | Chris Manning | Camilla Beeput | Pippa Fulton | Marli Buck | Nigel Wilson | Katie Lewis | Malachi Cush | Ainslie Henderson | Lemar Obika | David Sneddon |

Notes:

- Note 1: In the launch show, the public were given the chance to choose the 12th finalist from David Sneddon, Paul MacDonald and Sinéad Quinn. Sinéad won the vote and joined the academy.
- Note 2: Naomi was suffering from illness, and was awarded a one-week bye to recover, so did not perform at the first live show.
- Note 3: With Naomi's condition showing no sign of improving, she was forced to leave the Academy midweek. She was replaced by David, who had finished runner-up in the initial public vote. To replace David as a further alternate contingency should one be required later in the show, contestant Dave Martin was invited back following his initial auditions performance. Dave was not required during the live shows but maintained an active presence in the west Cumbrian music scene before fulfilling his childhood ambition in working for the Emergency Services in Cumbria.
- Note 4: The Week 6 live show was postponed to Sunday night due to the Children In Need broadcast that aired in the shows usual Friday slot.
- Note 5: The judges allowed the public to choose the final Grade A student from Ainslie, Lemar and Sinéad. Listeners to The Chris Moyles Show were encouraged to vote for their favourite, who would also earn a special solo performance on the Children In Need broadcast. Sinéad was revealed as the winner, and performed live at the event.
- Note 6: Ainslie and Sinéad were both saved by the public. The students had no vote to save this week.
- Note 7: For the first time, all the remaining students faced probation. Lemar was saved over Ainslie by David and Sinead.
- Note 8: In the final, the public vote alone decided who would win the competition. At the first voting freeze, Lemar had the fewest votes, and was sent home. David and Sinéad then competed for the title.

== Final (13 December) ==
The final was broadcast live as two separate shows. The final three contestants were David, Sinéad and Lemar. In the first half, after votes totalling over 4 million, Lemar was the first to be voted off by the public. Neither of the two remaining finalists, David and Sinéad, had been in the original group of eleven students chosen by the judges at the start of the series.

In the second half David sang "I Don't Want To Talk About It" and Sinéad then sang "The First Cut Is The Deepest". Then David and Sinéad sang "I Guess That's Why They Call It The Blues". After a total of over 6.9 million votes were cast, David won with 3.5 million votes. He then sang what was to become his debut #1 single, Stop Living the Lie, to end the show.

David Sneddon signed a £1 million record contract with Mercury Records as part of his prize. His debut single "Stop Living the Lie", entered the UK charts at #1 and remained at the top for two weeks. He is one of only a few artists from reality TV shows to have a number one hit record with a self-written song. He had a further two top twenty hit singles and a top ten album, Seven Years Ten Weeks, (which was recorded with Elton John's band) and signed a development publishing deal with Universal Music in October 2003. Sneddon signed to major music publisher Sony/ATV Music Publishing in 2009 as a songwriter. Lemar signed a deal with Sony Records, and has since won several BRIT Awards as best urban act. Malachi, Ainslie, Lemar, and Sinéad also went on to release hit records.

Ratings of the show were average, but not fantastic. Most of this was blamed on the format being too similar to Pop Idol, while fans of the Reality TV element were disappointed by the awkward timings of the highlight shows . Despite this, a second series was commissioned for the following year.

== Album and tour ==
=== Album ===

An 18-track album featuring songs by all the contestants was released at the end of the series. It sold over 300,000 copies in the first week and reached #2 in the uk compilation charts. Profits from this and the following nationwide tour helped to fund the Fame Academy Bursary.

Fame Academy (Mercury) 3 December 2002

Track Listings

1. "With a Little Help From My Friends" - Ainslie & David
2. "I Still Haven't Found What I'm Looking For" - Lemar & Sinéad
3. "Fields Of Gold" - Malachi & Marli
4. "(Come Up and See Me) Make Me Smile" - Ainslie & Marli
5. "Lean On Me" - The Fame Academy Students
6. "The Tracks Of My Tears" - Marli
7. "Eternal Flame" - Pippa
8. "Brown Eyed Girl" - Chris
9. "I Can See Clearly Now" - Ashley
10. "Genie In A Bottle" - Camilla
11. "Perfect" - Katie
12. "I Heard It Through The Grapevine" - Nigel
13. "Vincent" - Malachi
14. "Goodnight Girl" - David
15. "Don't Speak" - Sinéad
16. "Back To You" - Lemar feat. The Fame Academy Students
17. "Keep Me A Secret" - Ainslie
18. "Lullaby" - Ainslie, David & Lemar

=== Live tour ===
In April 2003 all 12 students reunited for a 12 date arena tour of the UK, performing live to sell out audiences, with a final concert at Wembley Arena. A DVD of their performances, Fame Academy - Live, was released in September 2003.
