= Last Chance Lottery =

British television game show

Last Chance Lottery is a 1997 UK TV game show broadcast on Channel 4, presented by comedian Patrick Kielty. The show's current director is Stephen Stewart. It was produced by Green Inc. Productions.
