= Growing Flowers by Candlelight =

Studio album by Ainslie Henderson
- Released: July 15, 2006
- Genre: Acoustic, indie rock
- Label: Amphibian Husbandry
- Producer: Marc Pilley

Growing Flowers by Candlelight is the debut album by Ainslie Henderson, released independently in July 2006. Written by Henderson and Hobotalk frontman Marc Pilley, it features original artwork by brothers Joseph and Tobias Feltus from design company FeltusFeltus, who also designed and created Henderson's official website.

The Daily Record described the album as "a reflective and introspective record which could find a home with fans of Damien Rice, Nick Drake and acoustic R.E.M. littered with sparse and dusty story songs about girls, love and breakups."

In August 2006, tracks from the album received airplay during Jim Gellatly's evening radio show on XFM Scotland.

== Track listing ==
Track	Song	Length
1.	"Dust"	2:35
2.	"Don't Say"	3:49
3.	"I Need Reminded"	3:17
4.	"Day Trip"	4:32
5.	"Go Back to Sleep"	3:43
6.	"Love I Remember"	3:11
7.	"Finding a Lighthouse"	3:15
8.	"Body to Bed"	4:13
9.	"Man Made"	3:55
10.	"Roald Dahl Books"	3:45
11.	"While They Wait"	2:38
