= Patrick Kielty Almost Live =

- Genre: Talk show comedy
- Created by: Patrick Kielty
- Directed by: Stephen Stewart
- Presented by: Patrick Kielty
- Country of origin: Northern Ireland
- Original language: English

Production
- Production location: Studio A – BBC Blackstaff Studios

Original release
- Network: BBC Northern Ireland
- Release: 1999 – 2003

Patrick Kielty Almost Live is a Friday night aired chat show aired between 1999 and 2003 hosted by Northern Irish comedian Patrick Kielty. It was filmed in Belfast.

One of the most prolific guests was Canadian singer Shania Twain who appeared on the show several times.

Kielty interviewing Sharon Corr

== Notable guests ==
- Shania Twain
- Lorraine Kelly
- Tom Jones
- Lee Boardman
- Phill Jupitus
- Gail Porter
- Jason Priestley
- Rory Bremner
- Kelly Brook
- Craig Fairbrass
- Rupert Everett
- Amanda Holden
- Eddie Irvine
- Peter Kay
- Martine McCutcheon
- Jimi Mistry
- Tweet
- Natalie & Nicole Appleton
- Holly Valance
- Tim Vine
- Susie Amy
- Ronni Ancona
- Ron Atkinson
- George Best
- Rob Brydon
- Pat Cash
- Melanie C
- Jeremy Clarkson
- Jon Culshaw
- Craig David
- Jack Dee
- David Dickinson
- Noel Gallagher
- Damon Gough
- Nick Hancock
- Lady Victoria Hervey
- Dom Joly
- Jewel Kilcher
- Beenie Man
- Meat Loaf
- Dannii Minogue
- James Nesbitt
- Ardal O'Hanlon
- Jack Osbourne
- Tara Palmer-Tomkinson
- Nina Persson
- David Sneddon
- Melanie Blatt
- Jamie Theakston
