= Kim Medcalf =

English actress, singer and model (born 1973)

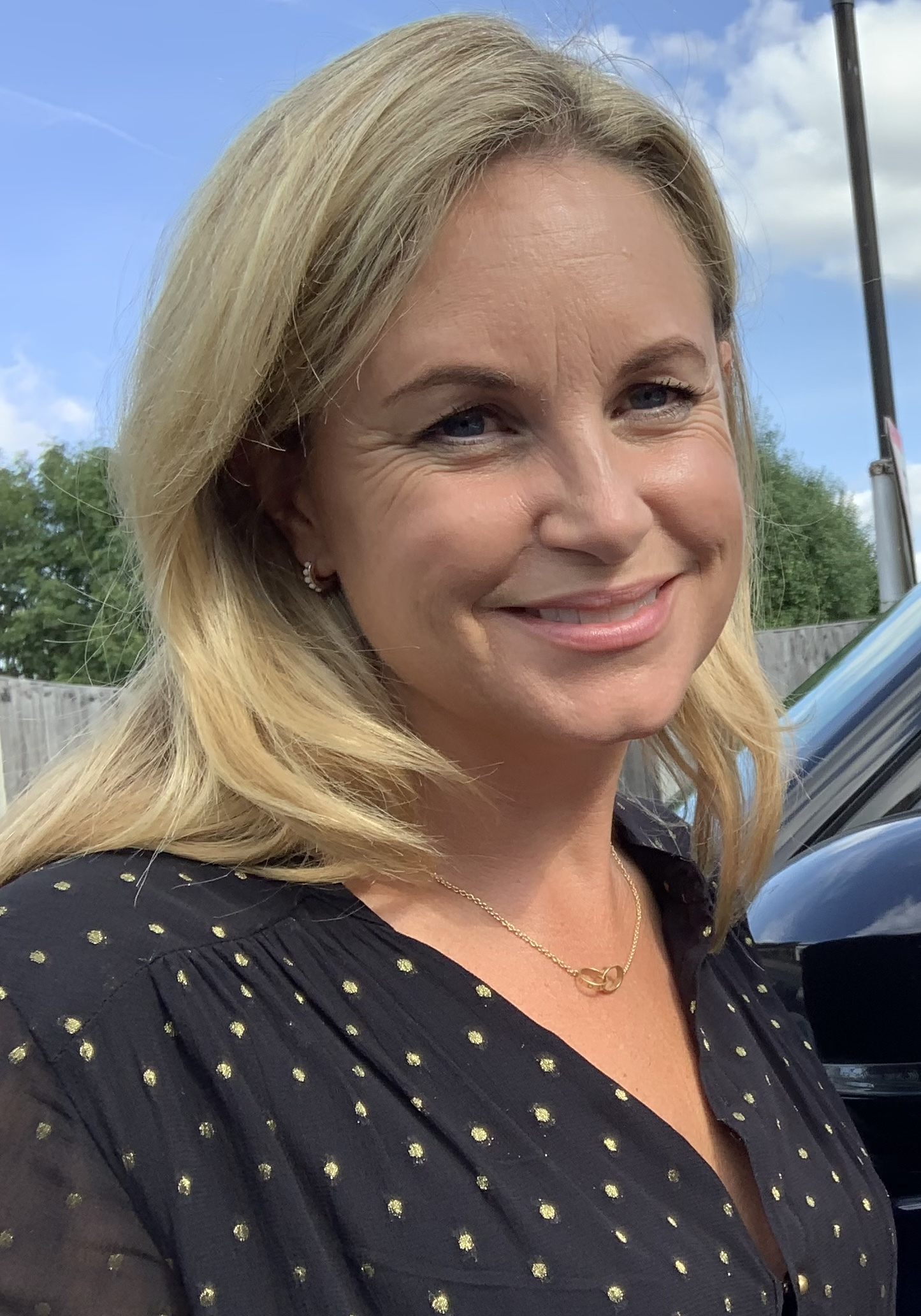
- Medcalf in 2022
- Born: Kim Louise Medcalf; 8 December 1973 (age 52); Bromley, London, England
- Occupations: Actress; singer; model
- Years active: 2001–present
- Known for: Role of Sam Mitchell in EastEnders
- Television: EastEnders; Harley Street; Missing; Collateral
- Children: 2

Kim Louise Medcalf (born 8 December 1973) is an English actress, singer and model. She is best known for playing Sam Mitchell in the BBC soap opera EastEnders (2002–2005, 2022–2026).

== Career ==
=== EastEnders ===
In late 2001, Kim Medcalf took over the role of Sam Mitchell from Danniella Westbrook who was recovering from addiction at the time. She filmed her first scenes with Barbara Windsor's character Peggy Mitchell in Spain in November 2001, which aired on 29 January 2002. She won the best newcomer award at the National Television Awards in 2002 and was nominated for the sexiest female award at The British Soap Awards in 2003. On 29 January 2005, it was announced that Medcalf along with co-star Michelle Ryan who played Zoe Slater had opted to leave EastEnders. Medcalf's final scenes were filmed on 22 September 2005 and screened in November of that year. Her character escaped imprisonment as an accessory to the murder of Den Watts (Leslie Grantham) and departed Walford to join her brother, Grant Mitchell (Ross Kemp), in Brazil. Her final scenes aired on 17 November 2005. In 2009, producer Diederick Santer opted to bring back Westbrook for a short storyline later that year.

On 29 January 2022, it was announced that Medcalf would reprise the role of Sam after nearly 17 years, taking over from Westbrook once again. She filmed her return scenes in February 2022. Her return scenes aired in the United Kingdom on 18 April 2022. Medcalf took an extended break in April 2023, with her return aired on 21 November. She departed the role once again on screen on 18 January 2024. On 9 November 2025, it was announced that she would reprise the role for a short stint, her return aired on 4 December 2025 and her departure aired on 26 May 2026.

=== Other work ===
Medcalf's post-EastEnders work included a role in a dramatic staged reading of The Penelopiad directed by Phyllida Lloyd at St James's Church, Piccadilly on 23 October 2005, appearances for Children in Need on 18 November 2005 and in South Pacific at the Symphony Hall on 29 & 30 November 2005. In Spring 2006, she undertook a four-month run in the revival of Hay Fever at the Theatre Royal Haymarket alongside Judi Dench.

Medcalf was the host of the Mitchells Weekend on the UKTV Gold network. On 23 January 2007, she appeared in an episode of BBC's The Afternoon Play called "Death Becomes Him". In February and March 2007, Medcalf appeared as the "guest star" in a short UK tour of the West End hit The Play What I Wrote. On 2 April 2007, Medcalf took over the role of Sally Bowles from Anna Maxwell Martin in Rufus Norris' revival of Cabaret at the Lyric Theatre in the West End.

From 25 February until 1 March 2008, Medcalf appeared in a run of The Vagina Monologues at the New Victoria Theatre, Woking, alongside Sue Holderness and Shobna Gulati. In March 2008, she appeared in an episode of The Fixer for ITV1, and then played a lead role in Harley Street, a primetime series for ITV1. In early 2009, she returned to The Vagina Monologues, this time in Nottingham,

Medcalf appeared in two episodes of BBC One drama Missing in 2010. Medcalf made her London stage return in 2015 when she appeared in Ruby in the Dust's production of Gatsby. Medcalf appeared in three episodes of BBC Two drama Collateral written by David Hare in 2018.

=== Singing ===
Medcalf is a mezzo-soprano. In 2003, she showcased her singing ability during the EastEnders Christmas Party TV special, where she sang "All I Want For Christmas Is You". Medcalf was invited to join the students of the 2005 second series of Comic Relief Does Fame Academy. She performed songs including "Don't Know Why" and "Perfect". The judges initially struggled with her performances but eventually she prevailed; helped by a performance of Delta Goodrem's "Born to Try" Medcalf finished in second place behind Radio One's Edith Bowman.

On 11 September 2005, Medcalf performed at London's Hyde Park when she took part in the BBC Family Prom; performing "Over the Rainbow" accompanied by the BBC Orchestra. On 16 July 2006, she sang at Love Letter to Dan, a gala tribute to Dan Crawford, the late founder of the King's Head Theatre.

== Personal life ==
Medcalf is married with two children.

== Filmography ==
=== Television ===
Year	Title	Role	Notes
2002–2005, 2022–2026	EastEnders	Sam Mitchell	Regular role; 571 episodes
2002–2005	EastEnders Revealed	Herself	Interviewee; 13 episodes
2002	Sport Relief	Herself	Television special
2003	Comic Relief 2003: The Big Hair Do	Sam Mitchell	Television special
2003, 2004	EastEnders: Christmas Party	Herself	Television special
2005	Comic Relief Does Fame Academy	Herself	Series 2 contestant; 2nd place
2007	The Afternoon Play	Laura Manning	Episode: "Death Becomes Him"
2008	The Fixer	Caroline Risdale	Series 1: Episode 1
2008	Harley Street	Nurse Annie Harke	Main role; 6 episodes
2010	Missing	Adele Scott	Episode: "Two of the Same"
2018	Collateral	Suki Vincent	Recurring role; 3 episodes

== Stage ==
Year	Title	Role	Notes
2001	One Touch of Venus	Venus	Kings Head Theatre
2005	South Pacific	Ensign Nellie Forbrush	Symphony Hall, Birmingham
2006	Cabaret	Sally Bowles	Lyric Theatre, London
2006	Hay Fever	Clara	Theatre Royal Haymarket
2008–2009	The Vagina Monologues	Various	Various
2011	Crazy for You	Irene Roth	Various
2015	The Great Gatsby	Myrtle Wilson	Arts Theatre, London

== Awards and nominations ==
Year	Award	Category	Result	Ref.
2002	8th National Television Awards	Most Popular Newcomer	Won	
2003	The British Soap Awards	Sexiest Female	Nominated	
