= A Night in November =

1994 monodrama by Marie Jones

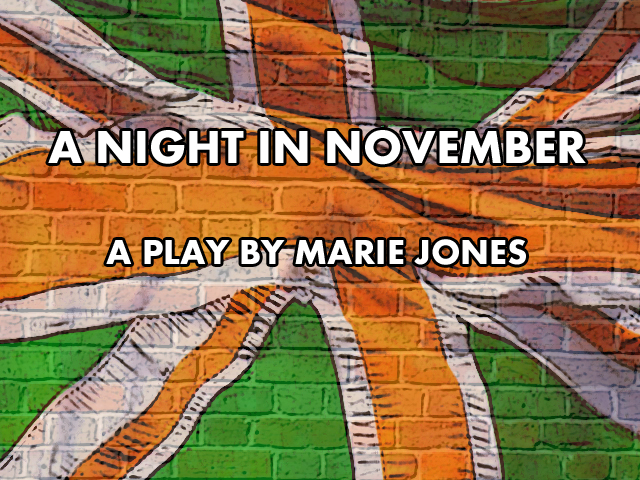
- Written by: Marie Jones
- Original language: English
- Subject: National Identity
- Genre: Comedy
- Setting: Belfast, Dublin and New York City

Premiere
- Date premiered: 1994
- Place premiered: Belfast

A Night in November is a 1994 monodrama written by Marie Jones about one man's struggle with national identity during The Troubles in Northern Ireland.

== Plot summary ==
A Night in November follows Kenneth Norman McCallister, a Protestant dole clerk working in Belfast, Northern Ireland. He has "cleanly discriminated" against Catholics throughout his life, and indeed he gains much pleasure when he gets accepted into the golf club ahead of his Catholic boss. This continues until he witnesses the hatred directed towards the Catholic supporters of the Republic of Ireland at a 1994 FIFA World Cup qualifying game against Northern Ireland which causes him to question his beliefs and his identity as a British Protestant in Northern Ireland. The play shows how Kenneth deals with his identity crisis through monologues and soliloquies as well as introducing numerous other characters for Kenneth to interact with, all played by the one actor. By the end of the play Kenneth travels to New York to support the Republic of Ireland at the 1994 FIFA World Cup, and he has come to terms with his identity as an Irish Protestant. "I am a free man, I am a Protestant man, I am an Irish man"

== Productions ==
On 8 August 1994 A Night in November was opened by DubbelJoint Productions in The Rock Theatre as part of the West Belfast Festival, starring Dan Gordon, directed by Pam Brighton, with a design by Robert Ballagh. This production toured widely, including a transfer to the Tricycle Theatre, London and to the Douglas Fairbanks Theater in New York City. It won the Theatrical Management Association's award for Best Touring Production in 1995. Dan Gordon then reprised the role for the Lyric Theatre in Belfast in 2002 and toured to the Perth Festival in 2003.

In 2001 Marty Maguire took on the role of Kenneth McCallister at the Celtic Arts Theater and Falcon Theatre, Los Angeles, directed by Tim Byron Owen. This production then toured to the Tricycle Theatre in London, the Edinburgh Fringe, and to the Gaiety Theatre and Liberty Hall in Dublin. It was staged again, at the Tricycle and the Irish Arts Centre, New York, in 2006.

In August 2007 Patrick Kielty starred in a production directed by Ian McElhinney in Belfast's Grand Opera House, which also played in Trafalgar Studios.

The play was staged in the ADC Theatre in Cambridge in November 2010 starring and directed by Michael Campbell.

The play was staged in the Tivoli Theatre, Dublin.

In 2019, the play was directed by Matthew McElhinney, son of the writer, for its 25th anniversary production, starring Matt Forsythe. It ran at the Lyric theatre Belfast and then went on an Irish tour. A digital production was produced for the Irish Arts Centre in New York during the COVID pandemic. The production then went on to the Chiswick Theatre London where it won an LPT award and secured two Offies nominations and continued on to the Minack before finishing its run at the MAC theatre Belfast.

== See also ==
- Irish theatre
