= Waiting for Duffman =

- The Simpsons episode
- Episode no.: Season 26; Episode 17
- Directed by: Steven Dean Moore
- Written by: John Frink
- Production code: TABF10
- Original air date: March 15, 2015

Guest appearances
- Cat Deeley as herself; R. Lee Ermey as Col. Leslie Hapablap; Stacy Keach as H.K. Duff VII

Episode features
- Couch gag: The family is repeatedly sucked into a portal above the couch until Bart eventually separates from the rest, avoids getting beamed up, and closes the portal via a remote control. He then finds a severed Homer head.

Episode chronology
| ← Previous "Sky Police" | Next → "Peeping Mom" |
- The Simpsons season 26

"Waiting for Duffman" is the seventeenth episode of the twenty-sixth season of the American animated television series The Simpsons, and the 569th overall episode of the series. The episode was directed by Steven Dean Moore and written by John Frink. It originally aired on the Fox network in the United States on March 15, 2015. The title is a play on Waiting for Guffman, which Simpsons regular Harry Shearer was one of the film's musical numbers' writers.

In this episode, Homer wins a contest to replace Duffman but learns he must be sober on the job. R. Lee Ermey reprises his role of Colonel Leslie Hapablap from "Sideshow Bob's Last Gleaming". Stacy Keach guest starred as H.K. Duff VII. The episode received mixed reviews.

"Waiting for Duffman" was dedicated in memory of Sam Simon, a developer of The Simpsons, who died seven days before it aired.

== Plot ==
When Barry Huffman (the man who plays Duffman) undergoes hip replacement surgery following an injury during a parade and retires, Duff Beer's owner Howard K. Duff VII sets up a reality show called "So You Think You Can Duff," presented by Cat Deeley in order to find his replacement. The judges for this competition are Der Zip Zorp (a best-selling Electronica artist that wears a computer monitor-shaped helmet), Missy LeBeau (a former Duff Girl and current senator from Oklahoma), and Rajneesh Superstar (a billionaire Mumbai entrepreneur). Homer Simpson eventually wins after his final competitor is disqualified upon Der Zip Zorp detecting a tattoo of a Duff Beer competitor, Olde Ogdenville Ale, on his back. After winning, Howard K. Duff VII tells Homer that he has inserted him with a chip that will reveal if he drinks, because he must stay sober on the job.

While sober, Homer sees the misery that Duff is causing to the people and environment of Springfield. At a motor racing event, he gives out alcohol-free beer as a placebo in an attempt to convince the audience that alcohol is not essential for a good time. This angers them, and they form an angry mob. Howard K. Duff fires Homer and tells him that there was no chip, resulting in Homer's return to heavy drinking.

Following the incident, Howard K. Duff tracks down Barry Huffman (who is now working at a coffee shop) and convinces him to take his old job back.

== Production ==
Cat Deeley was cast as herself, hosting a reality competition series for the next Duffman. R. Lee Ermey reprised his role as Colonel Leslie Hapablap from the seventh season episode "Sideshow Bob's Last Gleaming." Stacy Keach continued his recurring role as H.K. Duff VII.

For the episode's initial broadcast, the end credits included a clip of Sam Simon describing his work and a thank-you to him. Simon had died the week before on March 8, 2015.

== Cultural references ==
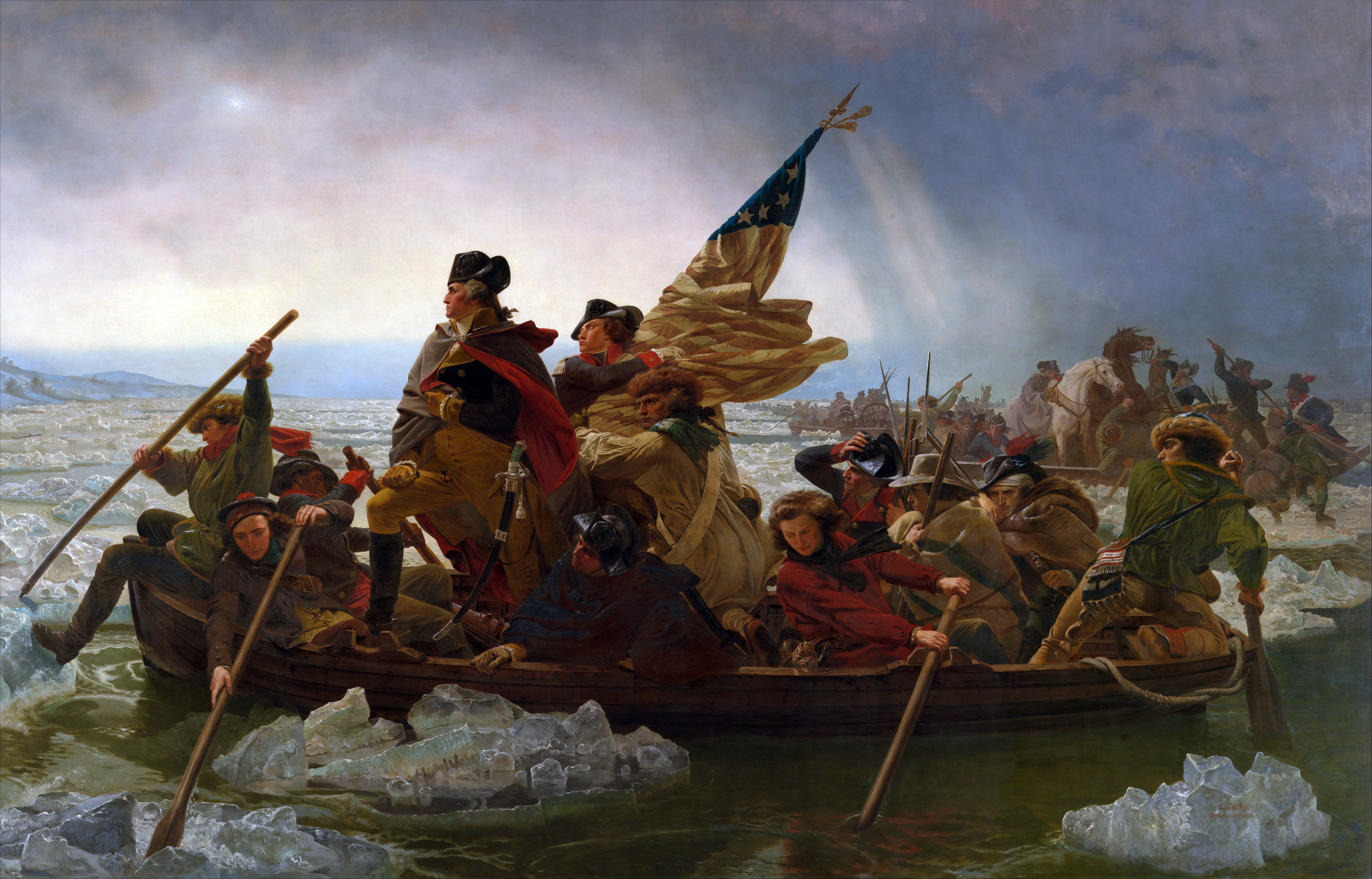
Ichabod Duff crossing the Duffaware River is a parody of George Washington's crossing of the Delaware River

- The title references Waiting for Guffman which itself references Waiting for Godot.
- When Homer says "No one's ever been killed by a t-shirt cannon", a t-shirt is fired into the Flanders's house, breaking the picture of Maude Flanders. Ned looks directly at the audience after the picture breaks, a reference to his wife Maude being killed by a t-shirt cannon in "Alone Again, Natura-Diddily".
- Barney's statements of "First they came" invokes the poem of the same name by Pastor Martin Niemöller.
- When the president of Duff Beer says, "With great taste comes great responsibility", it is a reference to both the "drink responsibly" disclaimer in most beer advertisements and the famous "with great power there must also come great responsibility" line spoken by Ben Parker, uncle of Peter Parker/Spider-Man.
- The song that plays during several of the scenes is P!nk's "Get the Party Started".
- The intro advert for Homer as Duffman is a parody of the hit fantasy HBO show Game of Thrones and later Homer does an oath that parodies the Night Watches oath.
- The Knights of "Another Round-Table" is a parody of Knights of the Round Table.
- When Howard K. Duff VIII is welcoming Homer to his company, he shows him a painting of his ancestor Ichabod Duff crossing the Duffaware River. This is a reference to George Washington's crossing of the Delaware River.

== Reception ==
The episode received a 1.5 rating and was watched by a total of 3.59 million people, making it the most watched show on Fox that night.

Dennis Perkins of The A.V. Club gave the episode a C rating, saying "There are a few funny lines scattered throughout "Waiting For Duffman" which provide exactly the quantity of laughs necessary to mark this as a serviceable Simpsons episode, without doing anything to rise above that standard."

Tony Sokol of Den of Geek gave the episode 3 out of 5 stars. He stated that the episode had plenty of laughs but was tepid.
