= Debatable (game show) =

British game show

- Genre: Quiz show
- Presented by: Patrick Kielty
- Country of origin: United Kingdom
- Original language: English
- No. of series: 2
- No. of episodes: 58

Production
- Running time: 30-45 minutes
- Production company: Hungry Bear Media

Original release
- Network: BBC Two
- Release: 22 August 2016 – 2 June 2017

Debatable is a BBC quiz show that has aired on BBC Two from 22 August 2016 to 2 June 2017 and is hosted by Patrick Kielty.

== Format ==
One contestant and three celebrities play the game.

In the 30-minute episodes, two questions are asked in the first three rounds; in the 45-minute episodes, three are asked.

=== Round 1 ===
Kielty runs a question with four possible answers past the contestant, sends it over to the team for discussion, and then asks the contestant for a final decision. Questions in this round are worth £200 each.

=== Round 2 ===
Round 2 is a picture round, where the contestant is faced with three pictures which have to put in order. Again, Kielty will ask the contestant, he will then ask the celebrities and he will then ask the contestant again and must have an answer. £300 is earned for each correct order.

=== Round 3 ===
Round 3 is a "Which of the following is true about...", and features three options. The contestant must pick one after having listened to the celebrities. Correct answers are worth £500.

=== Round 4 ===
For the final round the contestant picks one celebrity, and between them they pick a category and are given 45 seconds to find three correct answers out of six. If the correct three answers are given, the contestant walks away with all the money they have won in the game, up to £2,000 (£3,000 in 45 minute episodes). If there is one or more wrong answer, the contestant leaves with nothing.

== Panelists ==
The following have all appeared multiple times as one of the guest panelists on the show.

8 appearances

- Rick Edwards
- Ann Widdecombe

7 appearances

- Angela Rippon

6 appearances

- Susan Calman
- Russell Kane
- Sunetra Sarker

5 appearances

- Peter Jones
- June Sarpong
- Dan Walker

4 appearances

- Christopher Biggins
- Jennie Bond
- Michael Buerk
- Nigel Havers
- Konnie Huq
- Gethin Jones
- Carol Kirkwood
- Alice Levine
- Phil Tufnell

3 appearances

- Angellica Bell
- Ed Byrne
- Liz Carr
- Jonathan Edwards
- Tanni Grey-Thompson
- Rachel Johnson
- Sally Lindsay
- Tim Vine

2 appearances

- Akala
- Nitin Ganatra
- Germaine Greer
- Suzi Perry
- John Sergeant

The following have all made a single appearance as one of the guest panellists on the show:

- Matt Allwright
- Hal Cruttenden
- Grace Dent
- Alex James
- Naga Munchetty
- Esther Rantzen
- Angela Scanlon
- Nina Wadia
- Rav Wilding

== Transmissions ==
Series	Start date	End date	Episodes
1	22 August 2016	23 September 2016	25
2	17 April 2017	2 June 2017	33
