= Malachai =

Malachai may refer to:

== Name ==
- variant spelling of the name of the Hebrew prophet Malachi
- Malachai Nicolle, author of Axe Cop
- Malachai Boardmann, character in Stephen King's "Children of the Corn", played by Courtney Gains in the film
- Malachai Parker, character in The Vampire Diaries, played by Chris Wood in the series
- Malachai, Thaumaturge Laureate, character in the game Path of Exile

== Music ==
- Malachai (band)
- Malachai (album)

== See also ==
- Malachi (disambiguation)
