= Richard Park (broadcaster) =

Scottish media consultant and broadcaster (born 1948)

- Born: 10 March 1948 (age 78); Kirkcaldy, Scotland
- Occupations: Group Executive Director & Director of Broadcasting at Global
- Years active: 1966–present
- Title: Director of Wildstar Records (1996–2001); Director of Park Management (2001–present); Director of Park Records (2003–present); Group Executive DirectorGlobal (2007–present)

Richard Park (born 10 March 1948) is a Scottish media executive, consultant and broadcaster. He is senior programming advisor at Global Media & Entertainment where he advises on all Global brands including Capital, Capital XTRA, Heart, LBC, Classic FM, Smooth and Radio X. He was previously a media consultant and broadcaster in the UK.

== Professional career ==
Voted most influential person in the music industry by record and radio industry executives in 2001, Park began his career as a Pirate DJ on offshore station Radio Scotland in 1966. Later he joined the fledgling BBC Radio 1 network presenting such programmes as The Radio 1 Club and Round Table show.

In the mid-1970s, he joined Radio Clyde specialising in music and sport programming working his way up to be head of entertainment. He hosted a variety of shows and also became the football station's regular football commentator, working alongside summariser James Sanderson.

Park moved to London in 1987, to become Programme Controller at Capital Radio. He was instrumental in promoting Pete Tong, Tim Westwood and Neil Fox.

In 1996, he formed Wildstar Records, uniting Capital and Telstar Records. As director, he was responsible for signing Craig David. In 1997, he was responsible along with executives from LWT for creating the short-lived television show "Live From The Capital Cafe" which was simulcast on Capital Radio. Presented by Dani Behr & Jason Bradbury the 90min show broadcast just after 11pm on Friday nights lasted only four weeks, it did not return for a second season.

In 2001, after 14 years with Capital, he left to set up his own consultancy company, Park Management. Two years later, he set up Park Records, a joint venture with Universal Music. He was also radio consultant for Emap, working on Magic and Big City networks. In 2004 and 2005, Park appeared on London's LBC 97.3 as presenter of their Weekend Breakfast Show and stood-in for Nick Ferrari & James O'Brien on the mid-morning weekday phone-in. In the summer of 2005, he also presented a series of Saturday sports shows on Talksport discussing a wide range of sporting topics including football, cricket, rugby and tennis. He appeared as himself in the 2005 Christmas special of The Catherine Tate Show. Lauren and her friends perform a version of the Black Eyed Peas' "Shut Up", which is met with harsh negative comments by Park.

In 2007, after joining Global Radio, he removed the entertainment programming from LBC 97.3 to turn it into a topical talk station. He built up a management and broadcast team for all Global radio brands which now attracts over 25 million listeners a week.

He is a Fellow of The Radio Academy.

== Fame Academy ==
Park appeared in both series of BBC TV's Fame Academy as the "Headmaster", and gained a reputation for both his harsh criticisms of the students, and his long running on-screen feud with presenter Patrick Kielty. This came to a head during the 2005 series of Comic Relief does Fame Academy, where his scathing remarks about the contestants, who were all appearing solely to raise money for charity, caused them to threaten a walk-out.

The BBC received 450 viewer complaints after Park made an offensive hand gesture to host Patrick Kielty on live television during the Saturday evening charity programme. The incident, broadcast well before the watershed at 7pm, came after Park criticised Kielty for "sycophantically stroking" the egos of the contestants. As the camera cut to co-host Cat Deeley, Park was pictured in the background mouthing the word "wanker" before making the accompanying gesture. The BBC issued an apology, and said he had not realised he was on camera at the time. He made a cameo appearance in The Catherine Tate Show judging Lauren Cooper and her friends.

== Personal ==
Park is married to Anna a retailer. They have two children. He also has a son and a daughter from a previous marriage.
