= South Bank Colleges =

College in England

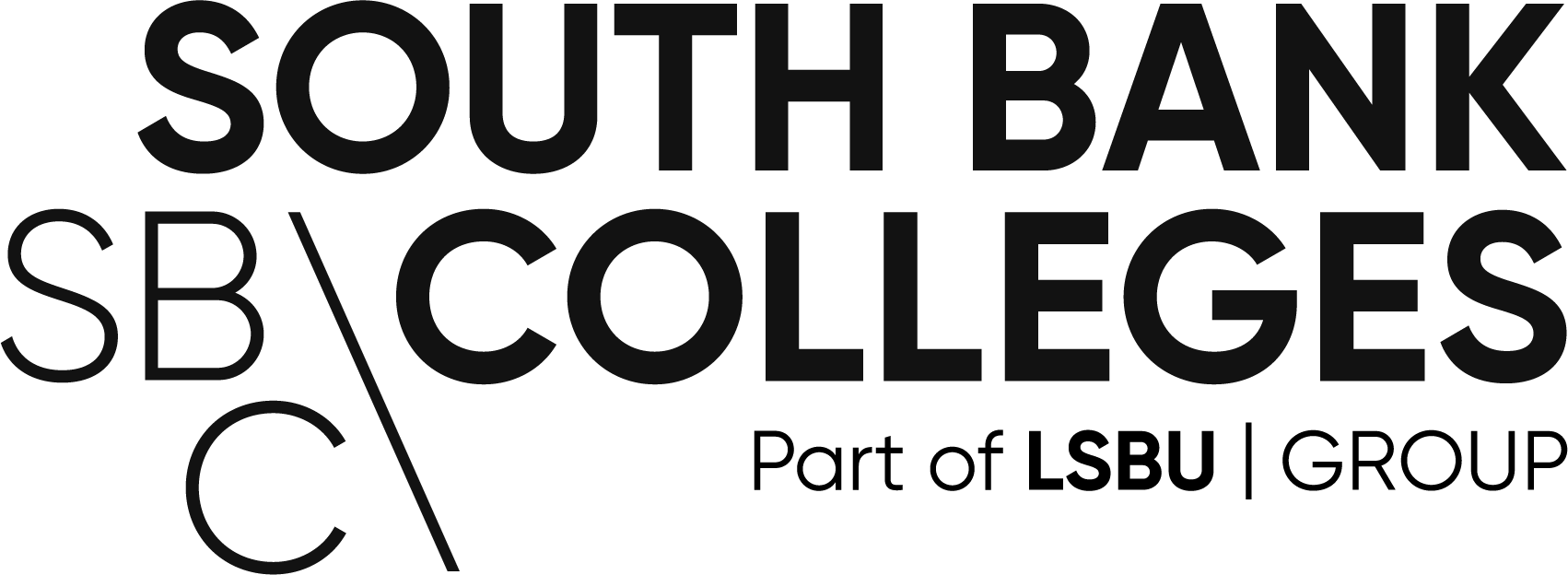

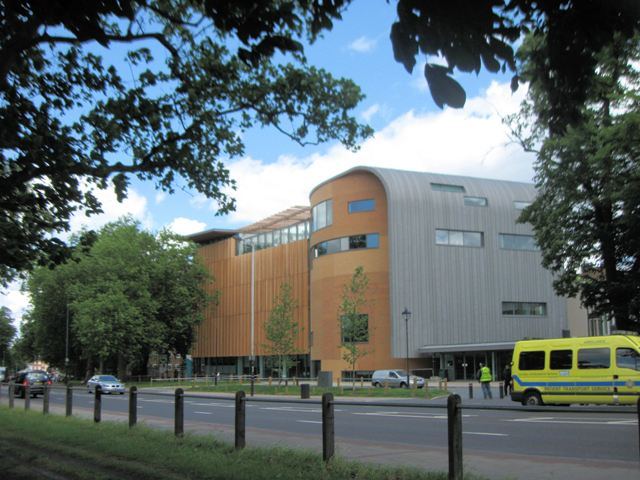

Location
- 45 Clapham Common South Side, London; London, SW4 9BL; England

Information
- Type: Further Education College
- Motto: Learning by Doing
- Established: 1850s-1992 – founding institutions 1992 – Lambeth College; 2019 – constituent college of London South Bank University Group; 2022 – South Bank Colleges
- Local authority: London Borough of Lambeth
- Department for Education URN: 130413 Tables
- Ofsted: Reports
- Principal: Fiona Morey
- Principal: Craig Hanlon-Smith - LSBTC
- Principal: Monica Marongiu -LC
- Age: 15+
- Enrollment: 10,000+
- Colour: SBC Blue Future Pink
- Campuses: 3
- Website: www.southbankcolleges.ac.uk

South Bank Colleges is a further education college in the London Borough of Lambeth. It was formed in 1992, initially as Lambeth College, from three former institutions – Vauxhall College of Building and Further Education, Brixton College of Further Education, and South London College (previously known as Norwood Technical College). The college serves around 10,000 students from its three campuses at Clapham, Brixton and Nine Elms. The Nine Elms campus opened in 2023 and this third site specialises in the provision of STEAM (Science, Technology, Engineering, Arts, and Maths). Lambeth College joined London South Bank University (LSBU) Group on 31 January 2019 and became one of three national pilots designed to bring Further and Higher Education together. Now, renamed as South Bank Colleges, it comprises Lambeth College (Clapham Campus and Brixton Campus) and London South Bank Technical College (Nine Elms Campus).

== Locations ==
The three sites currently in operation are:

- Clapham 51°27′31″N 0°08′28″W
- Brixton 51°27′24″N 0°07′09″W
- Nine Elms 51°28′32″N 0°08′01″W

== Courses ==
The college offers NVQ, City and Guilds, CPCAB, UAL, NCFE, OCNLR, ESOL,Apprenticeships, Foundation Degree, Access, Online, BTEC courses in many subjects and also T-Level . GCSEs in English and Maths are also offered for students who lack these qualifications or wish to retake them.

== History ==
Created by an amalgamation of three colleges in 1992, South London College was originally known as Norwood Technical College opening in the 19th century.

Lambeth College underwent an overhaul in 2012, becoming an employability focused college with the priority of finding students employment in Lambeth. This change came complete with a new logo and motto for the college along with the planned addition of many new courses and removal of A-levels.

Lambeth College became a part of London South Bank University (LSBU) Group on 31 January 2019. South Bank Colleges (SBC) was then established by LSBU to operate further education provision (16-19 yrs) in the LSBU family of educational institutions. As part of LSBU Group, Lambeth College is building a local education model that has technical and applied learning at the heart of its educational philosophy. The Group comprises: London South Bank University; Lambeth College (a wholly owned subsidiary of South Bank Colleges); University Academy of Engineering South Bank and South Bank University Technical College (South Bank Academies, Multi-Academy Trust)

The college experienced a period of industrial action in 2014. Faculty members went on strike over proposed contract changes. While the dispute was not fully resolved, it prompted a dialogue about staff concerns and led to investments in the college's facilities, including a redevelopment of the Brixton campus, the construction of the new Nine Elms campus, and, now, a re-build of the Clapham campus (planning permission granted in February 2024).

At its last full inspection in 2025, Ofsted gave South Bank Colleges an overall grade of "Good".

== Notable alumni ==
- Kamla Persad-Bissessar
