= Marie Jones =

British actress

Sarah Marie Jones OBE (born 1951) is a Belfast-based actress and playwright. Born into a working-class Protestant family, Jones was an actress for several years before turning her hand to writing. Her plays have been staged on Broadway as well as across Ireland.

== Charabanc / DubbelJoint ==
Jones helped found the Charabanc Theatre Company, an all-women touring group, in 1983. It was created to help counteract the lack of roles for women, and which produced a series of collaboratively written original works. The group’s first play, Lay Up Your Ends, based on a strike by mill girls in the early part of the 20th century, was an immediate hit. She remained with Charabanc until 1990 when she left and co-founded the DubbelJoint theatre group in 1991.

== Plays ==
Jones wrote five plays for the Replay Theatre Company, including Under Napoleon’s Nose (1988). The play for which she may be best-known is Stones in His Pockets, a play based on the idea of a Hollywood film company filming a movie in a small Irish village and the resulting impact on that community. This was performed on Broadway to critical acclaim.

She has written a number of stage and television plays, including Tribes (1990), The Hamster Wheel (1991), Fighting the Shadows (1992), Wingnut and the Sprog (1994) and A Night in November (1994). A Night in November, about The Troubles, was performed in London's West End and in New York City off-Broadway. Most recently, she wrote the book for a new musical, The Chosen Room, performed in Belfast in August 2008 by Youth Music Theatre UK. She then wrote Act 2 of this musical, which was staged again the following year in 2009 at the same venue. She also written Women On The Verge Of HRT, Now You’re Talkin’ and Weddin’s Weeins and Wakes.

Fly Me To The Moon (2012), performed in New York and Belfast, tells the story of Davy, an 84-year-old Frank Sinatra fan and his two carers Francis and Loretta.

In 2018 as part of the theatre's 50th anniversary season the Lyric Theatre, Belfast produced the world premiere of Dear Arabella, a series of three monologues for three women.

== Film roles ==
As a film actress, she is best known for playing Sarah Conlon in In the Name of the Father; she has also appeared in Closing the Ring and Philomena.

== Plays written by Jones ==
- Somewhere Over the Balcony (1987)
- The Government Inspector (1993)
- A Night In November (1994)
- Women On The Verge Of HRT (1995)
- Stones In His Pockets (1996)
- The Blind Fiddler (2004)
- A Very Weird Manor (2005)
- Rock Doves (2010)
- Dancing Shoes: The George Best Story (2010)
- Fly Me To The Moon (2012)
- Dear Arabella (2018)

== Awards ==
- 2001 Laurence Olivier Award for Best New Comedy - 'Stones in His Pockets'
- John Hewitt Award for outstanding contribution to culture, tradition and the arts in Northern Ireland
- 1999 Irish Times/ESB Theatre Award for Best Production
- Awarded the OBE in 2002
- Honorary degree of Doctor of Letters from University of Ulster in 2006

== Marriage and family ==
She is married to Northern Irish actor Ian McElhinney. They live in Belfast and have three sons.
