= Patrick Kielty =

Northern Irish comedian, presenter and actor

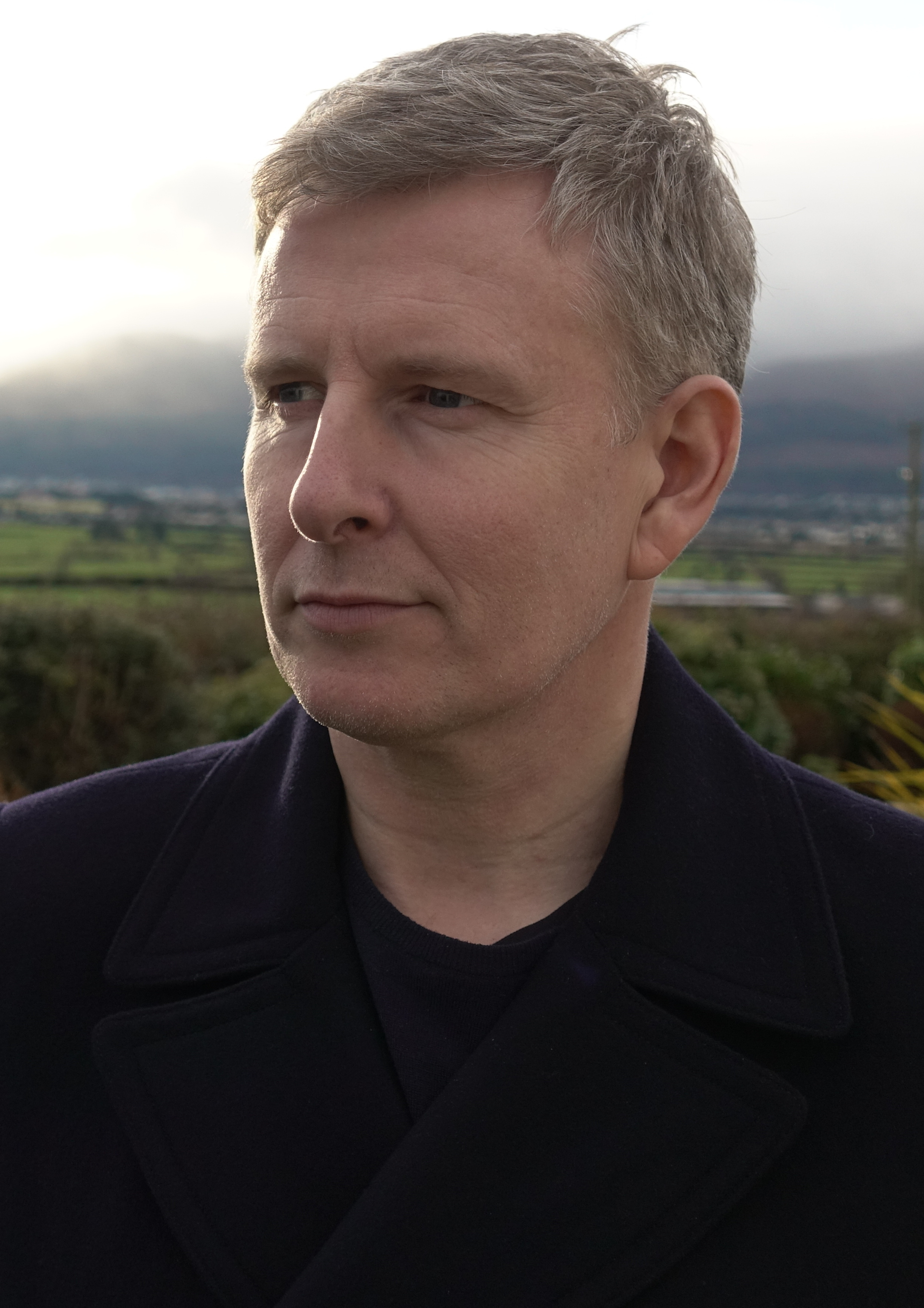
- Kielty in 2017
- Born: 31 January 1971 (age 55); County Down, Northern Ireland
- Occupations: Comedian, television and radio presenter
- Known for: Patrick Kielty Almost Live; Live at the Apollo; This Morning; The Late Late Show
- Spouse: Cat Deeley (m. 2012; sep. 2025)
- Children: 2
- Website: www.patrickkielty.com

Patrick Kielty (born 31 January 1971) is a comedian, presenter and actor from Northern Ireland. He is the host of The Late Late Show on RTÉ One and presents a Saturday morning programme on BBC Radio 5 Live. His television credits include the BBC's Patrick Kielty Almost Live and Channel 4's Last Chance Lottery. He has also presented ITV's Love Island and This Morning.

Kielty has appeared in several award-winning documentaries and films, including the BAFTA nominated My Dad, The Peace Deal and Me, Patrick Kielty: 100 Years of Union and Ballywalter.

== Early life ==
Kielty was born and grew up in the village of Dundrum, County Down, Northern Ireland. He is one of three sons of the businessman John "Jack" Kielty, who was shot dead on 25 January 1988 by the Ulster Freedom Fighters (UFF), a cover name used by loyalist paramilitary group the Ulster Defence Association (UDA). John Kielty was to have been a key witness in Central Television's defence of a libel action brought by Jim Craig, who was suing the television company over a broadcast of The Cook Report which connected him to racketeering, and is said to have ordered John Kielty's murder. Three men, William Bell, David Curlett and Delbert Watson, were sentenced to life for the murder of Kielty but were released in 2000 under the terms of the Good Friday Agreement. Craig was himself killed by the UDA in October 1988.

Kielty was a talented Gaelic footballer as a teenager and was a member of the Down GAA minor football team for three years, between 1987 and 1989. He was the substitute goalkeeper for the team when they won the 1987 All-Ireland Minor Football Championship.

== Career ==
Kielty began performing regularly while a pupil at St Patrick's Grammar School, Downpatrick. He was persuaded to participate by a Games master who spotted his impersonations of local politicians, celebrities, and sportsmen. His professional career started while he was still a psychology student at Queen's University Belfast. In 1991, along with his friend and fellow student Jackie Hamilton (later a BBC and independent producer), the pair visited Dublin's new stand up club The Gasworks run by performer/producer Billy Magra/McGrath. UK acts making their Irish debuts included Jo Brand, Lee Evans, Jack Dee, Stewart Lee, Mark Lamarr, Eddie Izzard and many more plus The Gasworks gave local acts like Sean Hughes, Jon Kenny/Pat Shortt and Ardal O'Hanlon their first headline shows in Dublin. After a successful opening spot (mainly doing impressions), Billy advised Kielty and Jackie to open their own comedy club in Belfast and The Empire on Botanic Avenue in Belfast was born. The following year Kielty was a finalist in a National Comedy Search organised by Billy for the Republic of Ireland's most-watched TV programme The Late Late Show. Another finalist, also making his TV debut, was another future star, Dylan Moran. Later the experience led to a hugely successful BBC NI series The Empire Laughs Back - also produced by Jackie. One routine performed at local gigs involved donning a balaclava and making spoof paramilitary pronouncements.

In 1993, Kielty presented the show SUS on UTV. He later became the warm-up act for a BBC Northern Ireland programme, Anderson on the Box, presented by local personality Gerry Anderson. When this show was axed, he presented its replacement, PK Tonight. Although this ran for only a year and was only shown in Northern Ireland, it did attract the attention of London-based broadcasters, winning him the "Best Newcomer" Award at the 1996 Royal Television Society Awards. In 1997, he set up the Belfast-based TV production company Green Inc with TV director Stephen Stewart, making shows such as The Afternoon Show, Patrick Kielty Almost Live, and Ask Rhod Gilbert. It was reported in 2010 that Kielty had sold his share in the company. Kielty graduated to presenting programmes such as Last Chance Lottery and Patrick Kielty Almost Live, broadcast throughout the UK. Following his liver transplant, former football star George Best later gave his first TV interview to Kielty on the same show.

From 2001 to 2003, Kielty hosted 14 episodes of the comedy game show Stupid Punts. He also presented a series of After The Break. He did an impersonation of Martin McGuinness (who bore some superficial visual resemblance to Art Garfunkel) singing the Simon and Garfunkel song, "Bridge over Troubled Water". Kielty continued to appear on national television, mostly light-entertainment shows such as the BBC's Fame Academy, Comic Relief Does Fame Academy and Love Island for ITV in both 2005 and 2006. On 21 June 2003 Kielty hosted the Opening Ceremony of the Special Olympics in Croke Park, Dublin, to a reported global audience of 800 million viewers. Other participants included Nelson Mandela, Mohammed Ali, and U2. In 2006, he hosted a segment on ITV's coverage of The Prince's Trust 30th Birthday LIVE alongside Kate Thornton. He hosted the original pilot series of the American version of Deal or No Deal for ABC in early 2004. However, ABC decided against airing the series, which ended up on NBC, with Canadian comedian Howie Mandel as host.

In 2006, Kielty returned to the stand-up scene with a new UK tour. A DVD, filmed at Belfast's Grand Opera House, was later released. In 2007, he began work at the Trafalgar Theatre in London's West End on the UK production of A Night in November, written by Northern Irish dramatist Marie Jones (Stones in His Pockets). He debuted in the play at the Grand Opera House in Belfast.

In 2007, he also guested on the BBC's third series of Live at the Apollo; during this show he controversially referred to members of the Irish travelling community in derogatory terms. On 18 May 2007, Kielty was invited to conduct a joint in-depth TV interview at 10 Downing Street in London with UK Prime Minister Tony Blair and Irish Taoiseach Bertie Ahern to discuss the Northern Ireland peace process. He hosted the Saturday morning show on BBC Radio 2 which started on 24 July 2010 and it ran for 10 weeks. Kielty presented Sport Relief in 2010 and 2012 alongside Fearne Cotton.

Kielty was the host of the first series of Channel 4's Stand Up for the Week, which began in June 2010 and ran for six weeks.

In 2012, he co-presented This Morning, alongside Kate Thornton for one episode and Emma Willis for three episodes. In 2014 and 2015, Kielty guest hosted a few episodes of The One Show alongside Alex Jones.

In 2016 Kielty returned to BBC Northern Ireland to present programmes, including the comedy panel game show Bad Language alongside Susan Calman and Paul Sinha. He then hosted television documentary Patrick Kielty's Mulholland Drive which focused on the life of William Mullholland and the California Water Wars. Kielty also reflected on his relatives' work in the Northern Irish water industry. In March 2016 he began hosting a chat show for BBC NI called Delete, Delete, Delete looking at celebrities' internet history.

In 2016, he presented Debatable, a daily quiz show for BBC Two.

In 2018, Kielty presented a documentary, My Dad, the Peace Deal and Me for BBC Two. The programme, coinciding with the 20th anniversary of the Good Friday Agreement, explored the state of Northern Ireland two decades on from the Agreement. Kielty discussed the killing of his father and the effect it had on him, as well as his decision to vote Yes to the Agreement in a referendum, even though it would result in the release from gaol of his father's killers. He also interviewed former paramilitary activists from both sides of the struggle, DUP leader Arlene Foster, school students at an integrated (non-denominational) school and Richard Moore, founder of Children in Crossfire who was blinded as a small boy by a rubber bullet fired by a British soldier, whom he later befriended. The documentary saw Kielty named UK documentary host of the year at the 2018 Grierson Awards.

In 2021, Kielty took part in the RTÉ series All the Walks of Life, where he talked about his childhood and the values he holds. He appeared in the film Patrick Kielty: One Hundred Years of Union, for which he won a Royal Television Society award for best presenter.

After much speculation, on 20 May 2023, Kielty was confirmed as the new host of RTÉ's The Late Late Show, taking over from Ryan Tubridy and becoming the show's fourth permanent presenter.

=== Radio ===
In January 2015, US Country star Garth Brooks gave his first UK interview to Kielty for a BBC Radio 2 special from Boston, Massachusetts. On 13 September 2019, Kielty presented The News Quiz on BBC Radio 4. In August 2020, Kielty co-presented Five Live Breakfast with Rachel Burden on BBC Radio 5 Live, sitting in for Nicky Campbell.

Since August 2022, Kielty has presented a Saturday morning programme on BBC Radio 5 Live.

=== Stand-up ===
In 2022, he embarked on his first stand-up tour for seven years. The dad-of-two joked on motoring podcast Fuelling Around that his Borderline show gave him the perfect opportunity to catch up on some sleep.

=== Acting ===
Kielty performed in the play A Night in November in August 2007 in the Grand Opera House, Belfast, and also in productions in London and in 2008 in The Olympia Theatre in Dublin. A documentary about the production of the play starring Kielty was released in 2008.

In 2023, he appeared in the film Ballywalter, playing Shane, a stand-up comic. He also appeared as himself in episode one of the BBC One comedy Queen of Oz. Kielty is seen and heard on his radio programme questioning the outrageous antics of spoiled spare to the British crown, Queen Georgiana, played by Catherine Tate. In 2026, he cameoed as himself on The Late Late Show on Netflix's How to Get to Heaven from Belfast.

== Personal life ==
Kielty identifies as Irish and Northern Irish, stating also that "Northern Ireland is part of the UK so that means there's a part of me that's British."

Between 1998 and 2003, Kielty was in a high-profile relationship with Irish presenter and model Amanda Byram.

Kielty married English television presenter Cat Deeley (his former Fame Academy co-host) in a private ceremony in Rome on 29 September 2012. Their first son was born in January 2016, and a second in June 2018. On 29 July 2025, the couple announced that they had separated.

Kielty is a lifelong fan of Manchester United.

== Charity ==
In 2010, he took part in Channel 4's Comedy Gala, a benefit show held in aid of Great Ormond Street Children's Hospital, filmed live at the O2 Arena in London on 30 March.

Kielty has participated in every incarnation of Soccer Aid until 2016. He plays for the 'Rest of The World' team as a goalkeeper and is typically substituted onto the field at the beginning of the second half.

After co-presenting Sport Relief on two occasions in 2010 and 2012, Kielty's participation in 2015's Comic Relief telethon was confirmed when British boy band One Direction tweeted a short clip announcing who would be playing them in a 'No Direction' tribute for Red Nose Day. Kielty, who impersonated Niall Horan, directed the skit in which comedians Jack Dee played Louis Tomlinson, Nick Helm became Zayn Malik, Vic Reeves took on Harry Styles and Johnny Vegas transformed into Liam Payne.

== Filmography ==
=== Presenting ===
Year	Title	Role	Network	Notes
1997	Last Chance Lottery	Presenter	Channel 4	10 episodes
1996	After the Break	Presenter	BBC1	6 episodes
1999–2003	Patrick Kielty Almost Live	Presenter	BBC Northern Ireland	30 episodes
2002–2003	Fame Academy	Co-presenter	BBC One	
2002–2012	Sport Relief	Co-presenter/Guest	BBC One	Presented two episodes (2010, 2012)
2003–2007	Comic Relief Does Fame Academy	Co-presenter	BBC One	
2004	Deal or No Deal	Presenter	ABC	Unaired pilot
2004	Top Gear	Guest		
2005–2006	Love Island	Co-presenter	ITV	Original run
2006	The Prince's Trust 30th Birthday LIVE	Host	ITV	
2006–2012	This Morning	Guest presenter	ITV	3 episodes
2010	Stand Up for the Week	Presenter	Channel 4	Series 1 (6 episodes)
2010–2020	The One Show	Guest presenter	BBC One	42 episodes
2016	Bad Language	Presenter	BBC One Northern Ireland	6 episodes
2016	Patrick Kielty's Mulholland Drive	Presenter	BBC One Northern Ireland	Documentary
2016–2017	Delete, Delete, Delete	Presenter	BBC One Northern Ireland	12 episodes
2016–2017	Debatable	Presenter	BBC Two	58 episodes
2018	My Dad, the Peace Deal and Me	Presenter	BBC One	Documentary
2019	The News Quiz	Guest presenter	BBC Radio 4	1 episode
2021	Patrick Kielty: One Hundred Years of Union	Presenter	BBC One	Documentary
2022–present	Patrick Kielty	Presenter	BBC Radio 5 Live	Saturday morning slot (9-11am)
2023–present	The Late Late Show	Presenter	RTÉ One	

=== Acting ===
Year	Title	Role	Notes
2007–2008	A Night in November	Kenneth Norman McCallister	Stage play
2023	Ballywalter	Shane	Feature film
2023	Queen of Oz	Himself	Episode: "There's a New Queen in Town"
2026	How to Get to Heaven from Belfast	Himself	Episode: The Box

Media offices
Preceded by Ryan Tubridy	Host of The Late Late Show; 2023–present	Incumbent
