= Malachi Cush =

Malachi
- Born: Malachi Cush; 23 September 1980 (age 45)
- Origin: Donaghmore, County Tyrone, Northern Ireland
- Genres: Pop Irish folk
- Instrument(s): Voice, guitar
- Years active: 2002–present
- Labels: Universal UMTV Emerald Music

Malachi Cush, also recording as Malachi, (born 23 September 1980), is an Irish singer-songwriter from Donaghmore, a small village in County Tyrone, Northern Ireland. Coming from a large musical family, he started singing and playing Irish traditional music at an early age. He appeared on the first series of Fame Academy and has had chart success in the UK and Thailand. His musical influences also included The Pogues, U2 and Van Morrison. Malachi is now married, to Clare.

== Fame Academy ==
Malachi was working as a gas fitter when he auditioned and was selected to appear on the first series of Fame Academy in 2002. This was the first time he had ever left Northern Ireland. During the show he recorded several tracks which later appeared on the album Fame Academy Finalists, released in December 2002.

== Musical career ==
After coming fifth on Fame Academy he took part in a tour of the UK together with other finalists and was given a solo recording contract with Mercury. In March 2003, '"Keep Me A Secret" sung by Ainslie Henderson, a song that he co-wrote on the show with Henderson and Sinéad Quinn, charted at no 5 in the UK. His debut album Malachi, (released on the UMTV label) consisting mainly of covers and songs he had sung on the show, came out in March 2003, and was the first solo album to be released from any of the Fame Academy contestants. It reached 17 in the UK charts and sales topped 100,000, for which he received a silver disc. The first single from this album, the self-penned "Just Say You Love Me", failed to chart significantly in the UK but reached number 1 in Thailand. In November 2003 he visited Bangkok where he performed at several concerts, met fans and took part in radio and TV interviews.

On his return he was asked to support the BBC Children in Need Project along with Girls Aloud and Westlife at the live nationwide broadcast from the Odyssey Arena in Belfast. He was also appointed a Patron of the autism charity "Impact Trust" and took part in many of their fund raising activities.

Early in 2004 he made a solo tour of Northern Ireland, which included a concert at the Waterfront Hall, Belfast. He was awarded Best Irish Newcomer at the Irish World Awards in London in February 2005. In December 2005 he took part in the Young Voices concert at the Odyssey Arena in Belfast, performing with the African Children's Choir and other young singers to a capacity audience of 8,000. He also played the lead role of Charles Charming in pantomime for the Bardic Theatre company in Northern Ireland.

After parting with Mercury, he signed with the specialist Irish music label "Emerald". In October 2005, under the name "Malachi", he released his second album, Celtic Heartbeat (Where the Heart Is), consisting of traditional Irish songs. He has also recorded two songs which appear on George Best – The Tribute Album.

On 18 February 2007, "Until We Meet Again", a song co-written by Cush and fellow Irish songwriter Don Maskill, was voted runner-up in the Eurosong 2007, the show to select Ireland's entry for the Eurovision Song Contest 2007. He released his third album New Day in November 2007 and was joined on the album tour by Joanne Cash, sister of Johnny Cash. Subsequently, Cash recorded a song co-written by Cush and Garth McConaghie at Amberville Studios and invited Cush out to Nashville to promote the song at the GMA week in April that year.

Cush now works mainly in Northern Ireland, performing live and supporting many charitable projects.

== Presenting career ==
After acting as guest presenter on BBC Radio Ulster, he received an award from readers of Big Buzz Magazine for most popular radio presenter 2005 and 2008.

Cush used to present a daily radio show, Six Cafe for Six FM and the Sunday Juke Box Show. Malachi worked for a time for UTV Belfast presenting The Seven Thirty Show and continues to enjoy a modest following for his music.

== Discography ==
=== Albums ===
Malachi released March 2003 (UMTV) Number 17 UK

Track listing

1. I Don't Know Why
2. Fields Of Gold
3. Just Say You Love Me
4. All I Want is You
5. Baby I'm A Want You
6. Amazed
7. Have I Told You Lately
8. Eyes of Blue
9. The Dance
10. Vincent
11. Something
12. How Can I Tell You
13. You're The One (Featuring Sinéad Quinn)
14. Shenandoah

Celtic Heartbeat (Where The Heart Is) released October 2005 (Emerald)

Track listing

1. I Know My Love
2. Spancil Hill
3. Carrickfergus
4. Who Are You
5. John O'Dreams
6. Lakes Of Ponchartrain
7. She Moved Thru The Fair
8. Galway Bay
9. Cliffs of Dooneen
10. Curragh Of Kildare
11. Raggle Taggle Gypsy
12. The Ferryman
13. The Parting Glass

Timeless Traditions released February 2009

Track Listing

1. Young Matt Hyland
2. Lovers' Heart
3. Ned Of The Hill
4. Step It Out Mary
5. The Wild Goose
6. The Donaghmore Exile
7. Spanish Lady
8. I Wish My Love Was A Red Red Rose
9. Peggy Gordon
10. The Creel
11. County Tyrone
12. The Soldier's Farewell

Songs for the Soul released October 2011

Track Listing

1. Morning Has Broken
2. How Beautiful Is The Body Of Christ
3. Be Still For The Presence Of The Lord
4. It Came Upon A Midnight Clear
5. Be Thou My Vision
6. The Lord Will Heal The Broken Heart
7. Voice Of An Angel
8. O Holy Night
9. Make Me A Channel Of Your Peace
10. Be Still My Soul
11. The Deer's Cry
12. Blessed Be The One
