= Sinéad Quinn =

Northern Irish singer (born 1980)

- Born: Sinéad Ní Chuinn; 24 March 1980 (age 46); Irvinestown, County Fermanagh, Northern Ireland
- Genres: Pop rock
- Years active: 2002–present
- Label: Mercury (2002–03)
- Member of: Sinéad and The Dawnbreakers

Sinéad Quinn (Irish: Sinéad Ní Chuinn; born 24 March 1980) is a Northern Irish singer, best known as a contestant in the first series of the UK BBC TV series Fame Academy in 2002. She later went on to sign a recording contract, released an album, and had a #2 UK single with "I Can't Break Down" in February 2003.

== Career ==
=== Fame Academy ===
Quinn did not enter the Fame Academy in the same way as the other contestants. The first eleven contestants were picked by the show's judges, but the final contestant was picked through a public vote in the first program of the series. Quinn, David Sneddon, and Paul MacDonald sang in this vote, but Quinn won the public's support. She gained 51% of the votes and won her place in the Fame Academy.

During the course of the competition she sang a range of songs from Macy Gray's "I Try" and Garth Brook's "If Tomorrow Never Comes" to "(I Can't Get No) Satisfaction" and No Doubt's "Don't Speak".

In the final, she was up against David Sneddon (who had entered the Academy at a later date after Naomi Roper pulled out due to illness) and Lemar Obika. She finished second with 2.5 million of the 6.5 million votes cast.

=== Solo career ===
Within a week of leaving the Fame Academy, Quinn signed a £1 million, five-album record deal with Mercury Records. Her debut single, "I Can’t Break Down", was released on 10 February 2003. It reached number 2 in the UK Singles Chart, being beaten to the top spot by t.A.T.u. The single sold 95,000 copies, finishing in 65th place for the top-selling UK singles of 2003. The video was directed by Dani Jacobs and filmed in the empty Fame Academy house. Her follow-up single "What You Need Is" reached number 19 in the same chart, and her self-written album, Ready to Run, peaked at number 48 in the UK Albums Chart.

Quinn's only other releases to date were on the Fame Academy Album, alongside all the other Fame Academy contestants, and guest vocals on fellow contestant Malachi Cush's debut album.

=== Live performances and songwriting ===
Both before and after Fame Academy, Quinn was a keen songwriter and performer. The show allowed her to develop her songwriting talents and provided her with her first ever singing lessons. The Fame Academy Tour, which followed the series, gave Quinn her first major public performances outside a TV studio.

In the years since leaving Fame Academy, she has had a regular list of public performances. With the backing of a guitar-based group, she went on a university tour in 2003. She played to a full-house at Music Live 2003 at the National Exhibition Centre and, in 2005, she supported Children in Need with a performance and sang at the switch-on of Christmas lights in Coventry.

She took part in RTÉ's TV show The Lyrics Board, and on New Year's Eve 2005 performed on RTÉ's Everyone's a Winner, singing Sheryl Crow's "Everyday Is a Winding Road". Late in 2005 Quinn was invited by the Irish President Mary McAleese "to a reception to celebrate [her] contribution to the entertainment industry in Ireland" at the President's official residence, Áras an Uachtaráin.

Quinn played the role of Beth in the 2007 live tour of Jeff Wayne's Musical Version of The War of the Worlds. The same year, she performed at and judged the regional finals for Girl Guiding UK's talent competition Guiding Star. and also appeared at the Grand Final in Sheffield on 30 June 2007 as a performer and a judge.

Whilst she concentrated on smaller concerts in 2008, mainly in locations in London, Quinn was also the support act for Lulu at the Chichester Festivities in July 2008.

Since May 2009 Quinn has been performing as part of Sinéad and The Dawnbreakers. The band have been playing all over the country at various venues and festivals. They played at the Little World Festival in Meribel, France both years it has been running. Her husband Paul Stewart is the drummer for the band.

Quinn now plays corporate and private gigs and works at Electric Umbrella in London, which uses music therapy to work with adults with disabilities.

== Personal life ==
Born in Irvinestown, County Fermanagh, Northern Ireland, Quinn is the third child of Gerry and Philomena Quinn. She studied at the University of Hull.

On 9 October 2007, she became engaged to Paul Stewart and they married on 6 December 2008, at the Sacred Heart Church in Irvinestown. They have three children.

== Discography ==
=== Albums ===
| Year | Album | Chart positions |
| Year | Album | UK |
|---|---|---|
| 2003 | Ready to Run: Released: 14 July 2003; Formats: CD | 48 |

=== Singles ===
| Year | Title | Album | Chart positions | |
| Year | Title | Album | UK | IRE |
|---|---|---|---|---|
| 2003 | "I Can't Break Down" | Ready to Run | 2 | 13 |
| 2003 | "What You Need Is..." | Ready to Run | 19 | — |
"—" denotes singles that were released but did not chart.
