= Cat Deeley =

English television presenter (born 1976)

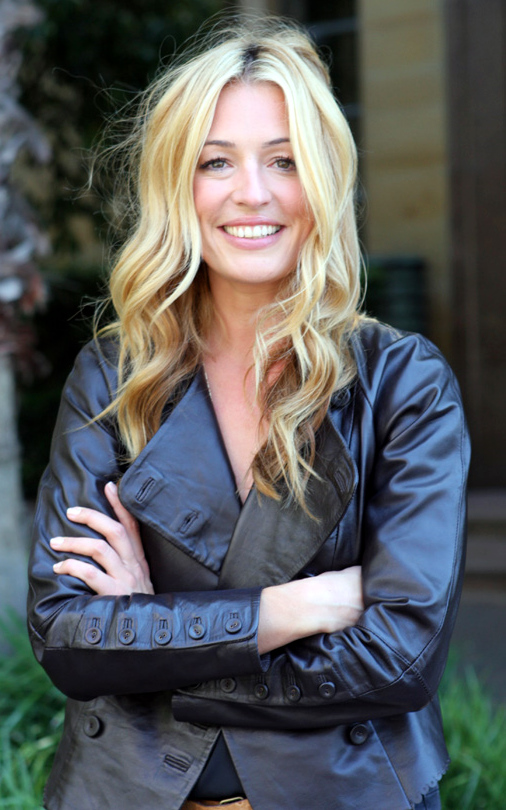
- Deeley in 2011
- Born: Catherine Elizabeth Deeley; 23 October 1976 (age 50); West Bromwich, West Midlands, England
- Occupations: Television presenter; actress
- Years active: 1997–present
- Spouse: Patrick Kielty (m. 2012; sep. 2025)
- Partner: Mark Whelan (2001–2006)
- Children: 2

Catherine Elizabeth Deeley (born 23 October 1976) is an English television presenter. Since 2024, she has co-presented ITV's This Morning, alongside Ben Shephard.

Deeley began her television career as a co-presenter of the ITV children's show SMTV Live (1998–2002), for which she won a BAFTA Children's Award, and its spin-off chart show CD:UK (1998–2005). In 2003, she co-presented the talent show Fame Academy on BBC One and became the presenter of the ITV talent show Stars in Their Eyes. Following the final series of Stars in Their Eyes in 2006, Deeley began hosting the reality competition show So You Think You Can Dance in the United States, for which she has been nominated five times for a Primetime Emmy.

Since 2003, Deeley has been a patron of London's Great Ormond Street Hospital for sick children. In December 2009, she was made a UNICEF UK ambassador.

== Early life ==
Deeley was born on 23 October 1976 at Sandwell General Hospital in West Bromwich, West Midlands. She grew up in Birmingham, in nearby Sutton Coldfield and Great Barr. She attended Grove Vale Junior School and Dartmouth High School in Great Barr, where she played the clarinet in the Sandwell Youth Concert Band. Deeley then attended Bishop Vesey's Grammar School in Sutton Coldfield.

== Career ==
At the age of 14, Deeley entered a regional edition of a BBC competition for The Clothes Show, in which she reached the national finals. She was signed as a model under her nickname of "Cat" to make it easier for clients to rebook her. She left full-time fashion modelling in 1997, following changes in her contract with Storm. Deeley started to co-present the MTV chart show, Hitlist UK, with close friend Edith Bowman. From 1998 until 2002, Deeley was co-host of the Saturday morning children's programme SM:TV Live, and hosted its spin-off programmes CD:UK (1998–2005) and CD:UK Hotshots. On SM:TV Live, she often acted as an apparently slightly unwilling assistant whenever the show featured a guest appearance by a magician, participating in a number of different illusions.

In 2001, Deeley won a Children's BAFTA award and appeared in an episode of the BBC's Happiness. In 2002, she appeared in a television advert for Marks and Spencer. Other programmes she hosted include The Record of the Year, Fame Academy, The 2004 Brit Awards and Stars in Their Eyes, as well as a weekly broadcast on London's Capital FM and a BBC Choice series, Roadtripping, both with former MTV colleague Edith Bowman. In March 2003, it was announced that Deeley would replace Matthew Kelly as host of the children's series of Stars in Their Eyes. Following Kelly's departure from the main series in March 2004, Deeley became host of the main show until its cancelation in December 2006.

In 2003, Deeley interviewed Kylie Minogue for a television special about her one-off concert, Money Can't Buy, which was broadcast in the United Kingdom on ITV on 22 November and in Australia on Network Ten on 24 November. In 2005, Deeley played herself in an episode of Little Britain, provided the voice of Loretta Geargrinder in the UK version of the film Robots, replacing Natasha Lyonne, and presented a countdown of ITV's 50 Greatest Shows alongside Phillip Schofield as part of ITV 50.

In 2006, Deeley began hosting the second season of American reality show So You Think You Can Dance, replacing newscaster Lauren Sánchez, who was pregnant at the time. Deeley again interviewed Kylie Minogue for another television special, which was broadcast in the United Kingdom on Sky One on 16 July, in Australia on Channel Nine on 17 July and BBC America on 9 September. Deeley was a guest reporter on NBC's The Tonight Show. She presented Fox's New Year's Eve Special from Times Square in 2006 and 2007.

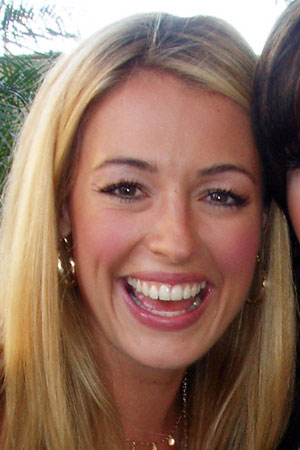
Deeley in 2007

On 1 July 2007, Deeley was one of many presenters at the Concert for Diana, a tribute concert to Diana, Princess of Wales, with proceeds from the concert going to Diana's charities, as well as to charities of which her sons Princes William and Harry are patrons. The event, watched by an estimated 500 million people, was held at Wembley Stadium. In September 2007, Deeley presented Soundtrack to My Life, a music series produced by Hamma & Glamma Productions for ITV London that featured the work and influences of an eclectic band of musicians. In January 2006, a new season of So You Think You Can Dance started its auditions, with Deeley in the role of host. She has been the host of the show ever since. In 2011, Deeley was nominated for a Primetime Emmy Award for Outstanding Host for a Reality or Reality-Competition Programme.

Other projects of Deeley's include presenting the third season of Soundtrack to My Life and playing herself as host of comedian Peter Kay's Britain's Got the Pop Factor. In February 2009, Deeley guest hosted the American syndicated version of Who Wants to Be a Millionaire (as an alternate host for Meredith Vieira) and appeared on BBC America's broadcast of Gordon Ramsay's F Word. In the same year, Deeley hosted the television version of the electronic game 20Q for GSN. In January and February 2010, Deeley hosted So You Think You Can Dance in the UK. Also in February 2010, she filled in for Vieira as host on the American morning program Today. On 31 March 2010, Deeley guest hosted in place of Kelly Ripa on the morning talk show Live with Regis and Kelly.

On 9 January 2011, Deeley made a small guest appearance in the Disney Channel sitcom Shake It Up, in which she portrayed a vice principal who is, in secret, a dancer and a host.

In April 2011, Deeley presented an episode of CNN's Icon and spoke to The Simpsons voice actress Nancy Cartwright. In the same month, Deeley also contributed to the network's coverage of that year's Royal Wedding, which was hosted by Piers Morgan.

In June 2011, Deeley launched her own "behind-the-scenes" web series called In the Dressing Room with Cat Deeley, produced by Deeley, Yahoo! and Collective Digital Studio.

On 18 August 2011, she appeared on Live with Regis and Kelly, as a fill-in for Kelly.

On 26 January 2012, Deeley again co-hosted Live with Kelly with Kelly Ripa as one of a series of guest hosts after Regis Philbin's departure. On 14 March 2012, Deeley appeared as a guest judge on America's Next Top Model Cycle 18.

She hosted Fox's celebrity dating game show The Choice, which premiered on 7 June 2012 and ended on 12 July 2012 in the United States.

In 2011, Deeley presented the series Royally Mad for BBC America, and in 2012, she presented the launch show for ITV's Soccer Aid appeal on the Friday before the Soccer Aid match. In June 2014, she once again presented the launch show for Soccer Aid that year.

From 2014 until 2016, Deeley appeared as a panelist on the syndicated game show Celebrity Name Game, hosted by Craig Ferguson.

In 2017, Deeley played Maskface in Ant & Dec's Saturday Night Takeaway miniseries The Missing Crown Jewels.

On 31 May 2017, Deeley presented the game show Big Star Little Star, based on the British game show Big Star's Little Star, for the USA Network in the United States.

In October 2017, Deeley began presenting the talent contest Sing: Ultimate A Cappella for Sky One in the United Kingdom.

In 2018, Deeley appeared on The Final Table Season 1 Episode 3, as a guest judge.

Deeley appeared in a reunion show for SMTV Live, in which Deeley and Ant and Dec returned to where the original show was filmed, and producers rebuilt the old set. It aired on 26 December 2020 as The Story of SM:TV Live.

In January 2021, Deeley made her BBC Radio 2 debut as a guest host on The Saturday Show. She has regularly provided cover, filling in for presenters including Rylan Clark.

She reunited with her Chums cast mates Ant and Dec for a television special on the fifth episode of series seventeen of Ant and Dec's Saturday Night Takeaway on 20 March 2021, which reenacts to the cliffhanger from the wedding episode.

In April 2021, Deeley presented Lorraine as a guest host over the Easter holidays, joining again for the May spring bank holiday broadcast.

Deeley's first book, a picture book for children titled The Joy in You, was published by Random House on 15 September 2020. It was co-written with Laura Baker and illustrated by Rosie Butcher. A Kirkus review of the book concluded "The message is wholehearted and positive, but the cloying execution doesn't stand out."

As an actress, Deeley appeared as herself in the sixth episode of Life's Too Short. She also appeared in the second episode of House of Lies as herself in January 2012. Her breakthrough as a lead actress came in the 2015 Hulu series Deadbeat, playing a celebrity medium named Camomile White. Deeley voiced a version of herself in a 2015 episode of The Simpsons entitled "Waiting for Duffman".

In 2023, she was a guest presenter for ITV's This Morning, following Phillip Schofield and Holly Willoughby's departures from the show. On 16 February 2024, it was announced that Deeley would present the show on a permanent basis, alongside Ben Shephard.

In June 2024, Deeley was criticised by the Epilepsy Society and some viewers of This Morning for making a joke about having a seizure on the show. After Shepherd asked her if she was alright while she was dancing, she stated she was "having a seizure". Deeley apologised the next day, and said: "It really wasn't supposed to cause any upset to anybody".

== Philanthropy ==
Since 2003, Deeley has been a patron of London's Great Ormond Street Hospital. She is also an active supporter of UNICEF. In 2007, she took part in a UNICEF benefit show in Los Angeles during which magician David Copperfield sawed her in half using his antique Buzz Saw illusion. In 2008, she visited a number of UNICEF projects in the Philippines, including their Soccer Aid 2 project in Manila. In December 2009, she was made a UNICEF UK ambassador.

== Personal life ==
Deeley describes her religious affiliation as Anglican, although she was not christened.

Deeley lived with businessman Mark Whelan for five years, splitting in 2006.

Deeley married Northern Irish comedian and television presenter Patrick Kielty on 30 September 2012 in Rome. They have two sons and previously lived in Los Angeles before relocating to North London. On 29 July 2025, they announced that they had separated.

Deeley is a supporter of West Bromwich Albion F.C.

During her first few years hosting So You Think You Can Dance, Deeley was described as "an approachable sex symbol" in a Los Angeles Times article published on 4 July 2010.

== Filmography ==
=== Television ===
Year	Title	Role	Notes
1997	Hitlist UK	Co-presenter	With Edith Bowman
1998–2002	SMTV Live	Co-presenter	With Ant & Dec
1998–2005	CD:UK	Presenter	
2000	TFI Friday	Guest Presenter	2 episodes
2001	Happiness	Herself	Cameo appearance; 1 episode
2002	Shooting Stars	Herself	Guest; 1 episode
2002–2003	Fame Academy	Co-presenter	With Patrick Kielty
2003	Money Can't Buy	Presenter	TV special
2003–2006	Stars in Their Eyes	Presenter	
2003, 2023	This Morning	Guest Presenter	4 episodes
2004	The Record of the Year	Presenter	
2004	Brit Awards 2004	Presenter	
2005	ITV 50 Greatest Shows	TV special	
2005	Little Britain	Herself	Cameo appearance; Series 3 Episode 1
2006	The Tonight Show	Guest Presenter	1 episode
2006–2008	New Year's Eve Special	Presenter	TV special
2006–2024	So You Think You Can Dance	Presenter	306 episodes
2007	Soundtrack to My Life	Presenter	TV special
2007	Concert for Diana	Presenter	TV special
2007	The F Word	Guest Presenter	1 episode
2008	The Big Match	Presenter	TV special
2008	20Q	Presenter	1 series
2008	Britain's Got the Pop Factor	Herself	TV special
2009	Who Wants to Be a Millionaire	Guest Presenter	5 episodes
2009, 2017	The One Show	Guest Presenter	2 episodes
2010–2021	Live with Kelly and Ryan	Guest Presenter	10 episodes
2011	Shake It Up	Vice Principal Winslow	1 episode: "Wild It Up"
2011	Icon	Guest Presenter	1 episode
2011	Life's Too Short	Herself	Cameo appearance; 1 episode
2011	Royally Mad	Presenter	TV special; also executive producer
2011	In the Dressing Room with Cat Deeley	Presenter	1 series
2012	The Choice	Presenter	1 series
2012	Soccer Aid	Presenter	3 episodes
2012	Fashion Mob	Presenter	TV special; also executive producer
2012	America's Next Top Model	Guest Judge	Season 18; 1 episode
2012	House of Lies	Herself	1 episode: "Amsterdam"
2013	The Exes	Charlotte	1 episode: "Take This Job and Shove It"
2013	Hollywood House Calls with Cat Deeley	Presenter	
2013	Good Day L.A.	Guest Presenter	1 episode
2013–2018	Rachael Ray	Guest Presenter	7 episodes
2014–2015	Deadbeat	Camomile White	16 episodes
2014–2016	Celebrity Name Game	Panellist	
2015	Project Runway All Stars	Guest Judge	1 episode
2015	The View	Guest Co-host	1 episode
2015	The Simpsons	Cat Deeley (voice)	1 episode: "Waiting for Duffman"
2017	Sing: Ultimate A Cappella	Presenter	1 series
2017	Big Star's Little Star	Presenter	United States version
2017	Love by the 10th Date	Maureen	TV movie
2017	Ant & Dec's Saturday Night Takeaway	Maskface	1 episode: "The Missing Crown Jewels"
2018	The Final Table	Guest Judge	1 episode; Season 1 Episode 3
2018	This Time Next Year	Presenter	
2020	Battle Ready	Herself	TV movie
2020–2021	Lorraine	Guest Presenter	12 episodes
2022	Great British Menu	Guest Judge	1 episode
2024–present	This Morning	Co-presenter	Monday–Thursday
2025	The Joe Schmo Show	Host	

=== Film ===
Year	Title	Role	Notes
2005	Robots	Loretta Geargrinder (voice)	UK version
2015	Lucky Dog	Amy (voice)	
