= Fame Academy =

British television talent competition

- Genre: Reality competition
- Presented by: Patrick Kielty; Cat Deeley
- Judges: Richard Park; Carrie Grant; David Grant; Robin Gibb
- Country of origin: United Kingdom
- Original language: English
- No. of series: 2

Production
- Running time: 60–120 mins
- Production company: Initial

Original release
- Network: BBC One; BBC Three
- Release: 4 October 2002 – 4 October 2003

Related
- Star Academy; Comic Relief Does Fame Academy

Fame Academy is a British television talent competition to search for and educate new musical talents. The winner would receive a chance to become a successful music artist and part of the international franchise Star Academy known under various titles in various countries.

In the UK version, the prize consisted of a £1m recording contract with a major record company, plus the use of a luxury apartment in London and a sports car for one year. It was broadcast by the BBC and co-produced by an Endemol company called Initial. The first series was won by David Sneddon and the second and final series was won by Alex Parks, it would be cancelled 1 year after its debut, on 4 October 2003.

Starting in 2003, Comic Relief Does Fame Academy saw celebrities singing as students of the academy with proceeds from the phone votes being donated to the charity.

== Format ==
The format was originally created in the Netherlands under the title Star Maker, and has already achieved major success around the world (especially in France and Spain) under the titles Star Academy and Operación Triunfo. A German version also called Fame Academy had been launched in 2003 on RTL II with far lesser success.

Every week, depending on the perceived quality of their performances, contestants would be put into either "safe" or "danger" zones. Anyone in the latter had to undergo a system of voting by the other participants to determine which one would then be forced to leave.

The show was partially reality television, because the daily lives of the contestants could be watched through live streaming via Freeview. This was accomplished through the installments of 'spy-cameras'. Coverage of the show was widely shown on BBC One, BBC Two, BBC Three, BBC Prime and CBBC (latterly under the title CBBC at the Fame Academy, on both the channel and the BBC One and Two strands).

== Concept ==
Although it was viewed by critics as being very similar to the Pop Idol and Popstars series, and was generally classified as an entertainment programme, Fame Academy was presented as a relatively new concept. The show was advertised as being considerably more than just a talent contest with the contestants singing on weekly live TV shows, as on the Pop Idol and Popstars series. The programme makers also included a long-term vision.

Fame Academy claimed to emphasize the creative talent of the contestants (called "students" on the show), who were encouraged to write their own songs and music as well as developing their singing technique and performing skills. Inside the academy for a period of ten weeks, the students were given a complete musical education. This included individual vocal coaching with tutors including Carrie Grant and David Grant, songwriting lessons, personal development, fitness/dancing classes, and workshops with professionals. The students stayed at Witanhurst, an historic Georgian-style mansion in Highgate that was specially redressed for the series. They were provided with dormitory-style living accommodation, communal meals and recreation areas.

The programme was filmed as a reality television show in the Big Brother format, with the students being completely cut off from the outside world and were not allowed to leave the "Academy" without supervision. The contestants were televised constantly through a vast network of cameras that were monitored 24 hours day.

Viewers of the streaming programmes were able to watch almost everything going on behind the scenes. Singing lessons, dance classes, rehearsals and costume fittings were all filmed, as well as the daily life of the contestants from waking up to going to sleep. This also included mealtimes, relaxation periods and "private" moments. The social interaction between the students, and the growing tensions as their numbers dwindled, added to the interest of the show week by week and highlights of the live streaming, heavily edited, were also shown as part of the CBBC and BBC Three spin-off programmes and on the weekly showdown.

The pre-selection auditions, of over 12,000 applicants, were held nationwide by music professionals and the production crew and were not part of the show. The final selection of contestants were presented to the public in the first airing of the series. Students performed live on the main weekly shows, individually, in pairs or in groups, singing a selection of cover songs chosen by the production team. Some of the self-penned material by the students was also showcased on the live performance shows.

The second series, broadcast from July–October 2003 reverted to a more "Pop Idol" style reality format, with little emphasis placed on the education of the students and the main focus being performance and the judges' criticism. It was perceived that this shift occurred due to the disappointing ratings of Fame Academy compared to Pop Idol, which ran over the same period in 2002, even if it was not placed in head-to-head competition.

Teachers and judges gave their opinions of the students' performances on air, and the television audience voted to "save" their favourite student throughout the week and at the live showdowns each Friday night, with one student leaving each week.

== Series overview ==
| Series | Start | Finish | Winner | Runner-up | Third place | Presenters | Judges |
|---|---|---|---|---|---|---|---|
| 1 | 4 October 2002 | 6 December 2002 | David Sneddon | Sinéad Quinn | Lemar Obika | Patrick Kielty; Cat Deeley | Richard Park; Carrie Grant; David Grant; Robin Gibb |
| 2 | 26 July 2003 | 4 October 2003 | Alex Parks | Alistair Griffin | Carolynne Good | Patrick Kielty; Cat Deeley | Richard Park; Carrie Grant; David Grant; Robin Gibb |

== Spin-offs ==
The first live show took place on 7 March 2003 and lasted until Red Nose Day on 14 March, where the final show was presented and the winner was announced as Will Mellor.

On 26 February 2005, Comic Relief does Fame Academy returned for a second live airing. During the Comic Relief show on 11 March (Red Nose Day), Edith Bowman was announced as the winner.

The Comic Relief series returned on 3 March 2007 for a third series. It was announced by the BBC that Cat Deeley would not return because she was hosting So You Think You Can Dance. Patrick Kielty returned this time with co-host and host of the former spin-off show, Claudia Winkleman. The third series ran nightly from Wednesday 7 to 16 March (Red Nose Day). The winner of this series was Tara Palmer-Tomkinson.

== Charities ==
The long-term vision behind Fame Academy was to inspire young people into music. Beside the televised series, a project was launched during the 2002 series to fund a charity through the telephone voting of the live performance shows. This became the Fame Academy Bursary and is supported by Youth Music, British Council and the BBC. It featured instrument/equipment awards and a number of three-year educational bursaries for the public to give them the opportunity to further their careers into music-making. It has since been renamed as the BBC Performing Arts Fund and was closed in March 2016.

It has nurtured talents such as Adele and awarded £5.2 million in grants in its twelve years of existence.

== Production ==
Behind the scenes of Fame Academy was also a large array of technical production personnel to ensure a smooth live broadcast on television.

The 2002/2003 series was headed by a team of 9 production managers encompassing the areas of web production, 24/7 reality filming for live streaming, setup of the weekly live 'expulsion' performances both at Shepperton Studios and Witanhurst, daily live broadcasts for BBC Three and CBBC. In general they also ensured the smooth running on-location. This also meant to act as a liaison with local authorities (Southwark London Borough Council and Camden London Borough Council), get building consent and permissions from its planning departments, handle (tele)communications between BT and BBC TV Centre and keep track of Security, Health, Safety and Fire issues.
