= Fame Academy discography =

Fame Academy is a British television programme that ran for two series, in 2002 and 2004. The show was produced for the BBC in a reality television format. The winners of the show, David Sneddon and Alex Parks, were awarded music recording contracts to allow them to release music and live like top recording artists for a year. Sneddon had a run of three top-20 hits, including his debut single "Stop Living the Lie", which peaked at number one on the UK Singles Chart in January 2003. David Sneddon signed to major music publisher Sony/ATV Music Publishing in 2009 as a songwriter. Parks' debut single "Maybe That's What It Takes" charted at number three in November 2003.

In addition to Sneddon and Parks, several other contestants have gone on to have successful music careers, while others were given record deals and released several songs before leaving the music industry. The runner-up from the first series, Sinéad Quinn, signed a record deal with Mercury Records, the same company as Sneddon, and released her debut single "I Can't Break Down" in February 2003. The song charted at number two on the UK Singles Chart. Her second single, "What You Need Is..." peaked in top 20 in June 2003. Ainslie Henderson's debut, and thus far only single "Keep Me a Secret" ranked number five in February 2003. Malachi and Alistair Griffin released self-penned songs in 2003 but were subsequently dropped from their record labels. James Fox was chosen as the United Kingdom's representative for the 2004 Eurovision Song Contest; he sang "Hold Onto Our Love", which charted at number 13 on the UK Singles Chart in April 2003, and received 29 points for his performance.

Lemar, who finished in third place in the first series, has been the most successful contestant from the show. He released his first single, "Dance (With U)", which charted at number-two on the UK Singles Chart, in August 2003; he has since recorded nine further top 40 hit singles, including six that charted in the top 10. He has released four studio albums; The Truth About Love is the most successful, charting at number three on the UK Albums Chart in 2006.

As of March 2014, Fame Academy contestants have released 28 charting singles and 10 charting albums. Of the 20 singles that reached the top twenty, 13 were top-ten hits. Eight of the twelve releases peaked inside the top 20. Lemar is the only artist who is still releasing music.

== Singles ==
David Sneddon won the first series of Fame Academy. His debut single, "Stop Living the Lie", was a number-one single while his album charted in the top ten.

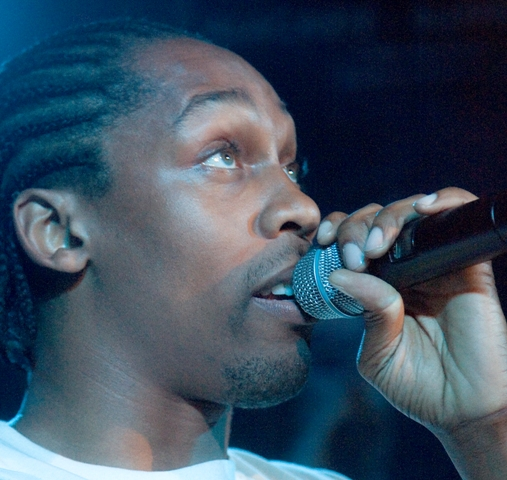
Lemar, who finished third in the first series of Fame Academy, has had ten top-40 singles.

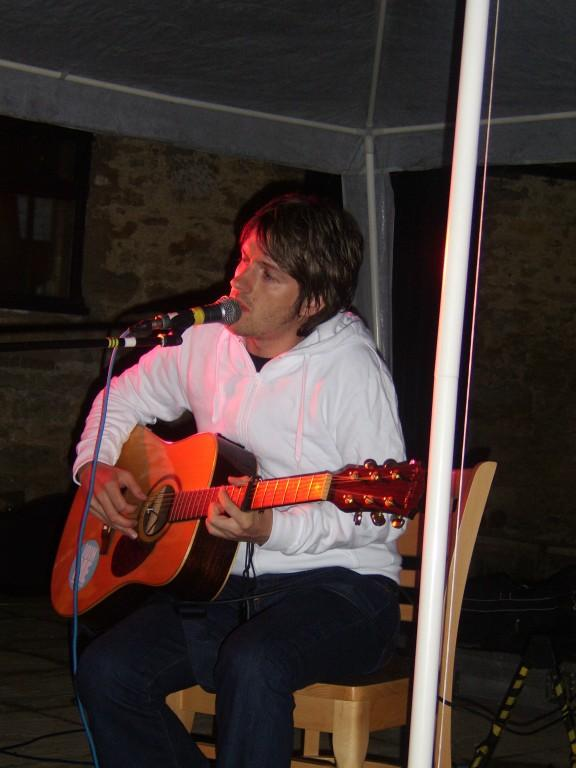
Alistair Griffin's "Bring It On/My Lover's Prayer" charted in the top five.

Artist	Series	Position in show	Song title	Release date	UK peak chart position	Ref(s)
David Sneddon	1	Winner	"Stop Living the Lie"	13 January 2003	1	
Sinéad Quinn	1	Runner-up	"I Can't Break Down"	10 February 2003	2	
Ainslie Henderson	1	4th	"Keep Me a Secret"	24 February 2003	5	
Malachi Cush	1	5th	"Just Say You Love Me"	14 April 2003	49	
David Sneddon	1	Winner	"Don't Let Go"	21 April 2003	3	
Sinéad Quinn	1	Runner-up	"What You Need Is..."	30 June 2003	19	
David Sneddon	1	Winner	"Best of Order"	11 August 2003	18	
Lemar	1	3rd	"Dance (With U)"	18 August 2003	2	
David Sneddon	1	Winner	"Baby Get Higher"	27 October 2003	38	
Lemar	1	3rd	"50/50" / "Lullaby"	17 November 2003	5	
Alex Parks	2	Winner	"Maybe That's What It Takes"	17 November 2003	3	
Alistair Griffin	2	Runner-up	"Bring It On" / "My Lover's Prayer"^{B}	29 December 2003	5	
Lemar	1	3rd	"Another Day"	23 February 2004	9	
Alex Parks	2	Winner	"Cry"	16 February 2004	13	
Alistair Griffin	2	Runner-up	"You and Me (Tonight)"	15 March 2004	18	
James Fox	2	5th	"Hold Onto Our Love"	19 April 2004	13	
Lemar	1	3rd	"If There's Any Justice"	15 November 2004	3	
Lemar	1	3rd	"Time to Grow"	28 March 2005	9	
Lemar	1	3rd	"Don't Give It Up"	1 August 2005	21	
Alex Parks	2	Winner	"Honesty"	23 January 2006	56	
Lemar	1	3rd	"It's Not That Easy"	4 September 2006	7	
Lemar	1	3rd	"Someone Should Tell You"	20 November 2006	21	
Lemar	1	3rd	"Tick Tock"	19 March 2007	45	
James Fox	1	5th	"Bluebirds Flying High"^{A}	11 May 2008	15	
Lemar	1	3rd	"If She Knew"	10 November 2008	14	
Lemar	1	3rd	"Weight of the World"	2 March 2009	31	
Alistair Griffin	2	Runner-up	"Just Drive"	27 November 2010	38	
Lemar	1	3rd	"The Way Love Goes"	14 February 2010	8	

== Albums ==
Only albums that charted in the Top 100 of the UK albums chart are included in this list.

Artist	Album title	Release date	UK peak chart position	Ref(s)
Malachi Cush	Malachi	24 March 2003	17	
David Sneddon	Seven Years – Ten Weeks	28 April 2003	5	
Sinéad Quinn	Ready to Run	14 July 2003	48	
Lemar	Dedicated	24 November 2003	16	
Alistair Griffin	Bring It On	12 January 2004	12	
Alex Parks	Introduction	24 November 2003	5	
Lemar	Time to Grow	29 November 2004	8	
Alex Parks	Honesty	24 October 2005	24	
Lemar	The Truth About Love	11 September 2006	3	
Lemar	The Reason	24 November 2008	41	
Lemar	The Hits	8 March 2010	18	
Lemar	Invincible	8 October 2012	49	
Lemar	The Letter	9 October 2015	31	

=== Fame Academy albums ===
At the end of both series, a compilation album was released featuring cover versions from the contestants. The first album reached number two on the UK Compilation Chart. A third album, Bee Gees Special, was released during the show's broadcast and featured cover versions of Bee Gees songs.

Album title	Record label	Series	Release date	UK peak chart position
Fame Academy	Mercury Records	1	December 2002	2
Fame Academy Bee Gees Special	Polydor Records	2	August 2003	—
Fame Academy - The Finalists	Polydor Records	2	October 2003	—

== Other releases ==
- Alistair Griffin released a cover version of "Hallelujah" called "Hallelujah Mark Viduka" through iTunes.
- Malachi Cush has released four further albums that have failed to chart: Celtic Heartbeat (Where the Heart Is) (2005) and Two Sides of Malachi and New Day (both 2007) and Timeless (2009).
- James Fox released an EP entitled Six Strings and an album that failed to chart called Rocking Chairs and Lemonade. He released a single "Higher" in 2008.
- Alex Parks released "Looking for Water" as a download-only single but the song only peaked at number 250.
- Peter Brame released an album, My Secret Suicide, in 2008, but it failed to chart.

== See also ==
- Popstars (UK) discography
- Pop Idol discography

== Notes ==
^{A} Bluebirds Flying High was recorded by James Fox with Cardiff City F.C. as the club's official song for the 2008 FA Cup Final.

^{B} Alistair Griffin recorded "My Lover's Prayer" with Robin Gibb, who had appeared as a guest judge on Fame Academy.
