= Lemar discography =

Recordings by English singer-songwriter

- Studio albums: 7
- Extended plays: 1
- Compilation albums: 1
- Singles: 24
- B-sides: 5
- Music videos: 19

This is the discography of English singer-songwriter Lemar. He has released seven studio albums, one compilation album, one EP and a number of singles, collaborations and soundtrack appearances. According to the Official Charts Company, Lemar has achieved seven UK top-ten singles and eleven UK top-40 singles.

== Albums ==
=== Studio albums ===
List of studio albums, with selected chart positions and certifications
| Title | Album details | Peak chart positions | | | | | | Certifications |
| Title | Album details | UK | AUT | FRA | GER | IRE | SWI | Certifications |
|---|---|---|---|---|---|---|---|---|
| Dedicated | Released: 24 November 2003; Label: RCA; Formats: CD, digital download | 16 | — | — | — | — | 54 | BPI: Platinum |
| Time to Grow | Released: 29 November 2004; Label: RCA; Formats: CD, digital download | 8 | 68 | 32 | 55 | 38 | 38 | BPI: 2× Platinum |
| The Truth About Love | Released: 11 September 2006; Label: RCA; Formats: CD, digital download | 3 | — | — | — | 22 | 87 | BPI: Platinum |
| The Reason | Released: 24 November 2008; Label: Epic; Formats: CD, digital download | 41 | — | — | — | — | — | |
| Invincible | Released: 8 October 2012; Label: Angelic Media; Formats: CD, digital download | 49 | — | — | — | — | — | |
| The Letter | Released: 9 October 2015; Label: BMG; Formats: CD, digital download | 31 | — | — | — | — | — | |
| Page in My Heart | Released: 24 March 2023; Label: Angelic Media / Absolute Label Services; Formats: CD, digital download, streaming | — | — | — | — | — | — | |
"—" denotes a title that did not chart, or was not released in that territory. Page in My Heart did not enter the main UK Albums Chart, but peaked at number 67 on the Official Albums Sales Chart, number 60 on the Official Album Downloads Chart, number 74 on the Official Physical Albums Chart, number 17 on the Official Record Store Chart and number 21 on the Official Independent Albums Chart.

=== Compilation albums ===
List of compilation albums, with selected chart positions and certifications
| Title | Album details | UK | Certifications |
|---|---|---|---|
| The Hits | Released: 8 March 2010; Label: Epic; Formats: CD, digital download | 18 | BPI: Silver |

=== Extended plays ===
List of extended plays
| Title | Details |
|---|---|
| Cricket (Songs from The Masked Singer UK) | Released: 5 April 2024; Format: Digital download, streaming; Notes: Cover recordings released following Lemar's appearance as Cricket on The Masked Singer UK |

== Singles ==
=== As lead artist ===
List of singles, with selected chart positions and album name
| Title | Year | UK | AUS | FRA | GER | IRE | NL | NZ | SWI | Album |
|---|---|---|---|---|---|---|---|---|---|---|
| "Dance (With U)" | 2003 | 2 | 43 | — | 71 | 31 | 39 | 6 | 89 | Dedicated |
| "50/50" | 2003 | 5 | — | — | — | 49 | — | — | — | Dedicated |
| "Another Day" | 2004 | 9 | — | — | — | 44 | — | — | — | Dedicated |
| "If There's Any Justice" | 2004 | 3 | — | 16 | 42 | 19 | 99 | 21 | 48 | Time to Grow |
| "Time to Grow" | 2005 | 9 | — | 10 | — | 13 | — | — | 22 | Time to Grow |
| "Don't Give It Up" | 2005 | 21 | — | — | — | 30 | — | — | — | Time to Grow |
| "It's Not That Easy" | 2006 | 7 | — | — | — | 34 | — | — | — | The Truth About Love |
| "Someone Should Tell You" | 2006 | 21 | — | — | — | — | — | — | — | The Truth About Love |
| "Tick Tock" | 2007 | 45 | — | — | — | — | — | — | — | The Truth About Love |
| "If She Knew" | 2008 | 14 | — | — | — | — | — | — | — | The Reason |
| "Weight of the World" | 2009 | 31 | — | — | — | — | — | — | — | The Reason |
| "The Way Love Goes" | 2010 | 8 | — | — | — | — | — | — | — | The Hits |
| "Coming Home" | 2010 | — | — | — | — | — | — | — | — | The Hits |
| "Invincible" | 2012 | 158 | — | — | — | — | — | — | — | Invincible |
| "The Letter" | 2015 | — | — | — | — | — | — | — | — | The Letter |
| "Love Turned Hate" | 2015 | — | — | — | — | — | — | — | — | The Letter |
| "Higher Love" | 2015 | — | — | — | — | — | — | — | — | The Letter |
| "Starlight" | 2018 | — | — | — | — | — | — | — | — | Non-album singles |
| "Lean on Me" | 2020 | — | — | — | — | — | — | — | — | Non-album singles |
| "All of My Love" | 2020 | — | — | — | — | — | — | — | — | Non-album singles |
| "A Change Is Gonna Come" | 2020 | — | — | — | — | — | — | — | — | Non-album singles |
| "All I Ever Do (My Boo) [Live 2020]" | 2020 | — | — | — | — | — | — | — | — | Non-album singles |
| "Future Love" | 2023 | — | — | — | — | — | — | — | — | Page in My Heart |
| "Dust" | 2023 | — | — | — | — | — | — | — | — | Page in My Heart |
"—" denotes a title that did not chart, or was not released in that territory.

=== As featured artist ===
List of singles as featured artist
| Title | Year | Artist | Peak chart position | Album / release |
|---|---|---|---|---|
| "Saturday Night Hustle" | 2008 | Sway featuring Lemar | UK: 67 | The Signature LP |
| "Get Down" | 2022 | Yemi Alade featuring Lemar | — | African Baddie |
| "Imanse" | 2023 | Akaycentric featuring Lemar | — | Imanse (feat. Lemar) |
| "Nights Like This" | 2025 | Donae'o, Omar, Lemar and House Gospel Choir | — | Spectrum |
| "Nights Like This (Remix)" | 2026 | Donae'o, Omar, Lemar, House Gospel Choir and Beverley Knight | — | Non-album single |

=== Promotional singles ===
| Title | Year | Notes |
|---|---|---|
| "Got Me Saying Ooh" | 2001 | Early promotional release |
| "Give Me the Night" | 2004 | Promotional 12-inch vinyl release |

== Other charted songs ==
List of other charted songs
| Title | Year | Peak chart position | Album |
|---|---|---|---|
| "What About Love" featuring JLS | 2010 | UK: 160 | The Hits |

== Soundtrack and cast recording appearances ==
List of soundtrack and cast recording appearances
| Title | Year | Artist credit | Soundtrack / release |
|---|---|---|---|
| "See Your Soul" | 2022 | Lemar | Little Darlings (Official Soundtrack) |
| "Destiny" | 2022 | Lemar | Little Darlings (Official Soundtrack) |
| "Just a Little" | 2022 | Little Darlings featuring Lemar | Little Darlings (Official Soundtrack) |
| "When I Find My Baby" | 2024 | Sister Act West End Cast featuring Lemar | Sister Act (West End Cast 2024) [Original Musical Soundtrack] |

== Other appearances ==
List of other appearances
| Title | Year | Artist | Album / release |
|---|---|---|---|
| "I'll Be Standing By" | 2007 | Ali Campbell featuring Lemar | Running Free |
| "What Am I Doing Here? Part 2" | 2010 | Chicane featuring Lemar | Giants |

== Music videos ==
| Title | Year | Director |
|---|---|---|
| "Dance (With U)" | 2003 | Nzingha Stewart |
| "Let's Stay Together" | 2003 | J.T. |
| "50/50" | 2003 | Max & Dania |
| "Lullaby" | 2003 | J.T. |
| "Another Day" | 2004 | Tim Royes |
| "If There's Any Justice" | 2004 | Martin Weisz |
| "Time to Grow" (UK version) | 2005 | Smith n' Borin |
| "Don't Give It Up" | 2005 | Martin Weisz |
| "Time to Grow" (French version featuring Justine) | 2005 | Karim Ouaret |
| "It's Not That Easy" | 2006 | Wayne Isham |
| "Someone Should Tell You" | 2006 | Ben Rollason |
| "Tick Tock" | 2007 | Max & Dania |
| "Saturday Night Hustle" Sway featuring Lemar | 2008 | Max & Dania |
| "If She Knew" | 2008 | Micah Meisner |
| "Weight of the World" | 2009 | Frank Borin |
| "The Way Love Goes" | 2010 | Dale "Rage" Resteghini |
| "Coming Home" | 2010 | Dale "Rage" Resteghini |
| "Invincible" | 2012 | Carly Cussen |
| "Love Turned Hate" | 2015 | Crooked Cynics |
