= The Hits (Lemar album) =

Greatest hits album by Lemar
- Released: 8 March 2010
- Recorded: 2003–2010
- Length: 55:16
- Label: Epic

Lemar chronology
| The Reason (2008) | The Hits (2010) | Invincible (2012) |

Singles from The Hits
- 1. "The Way Love Goes" Released: 14 February 2010; 2. "Coming Home" Released: 17 May 2010

The Hits is the first compilation album by English singer Lemar. It was released on 8 March 2010 through Epic Records. The album contains three new songs plus a re-recorded version of "What About Love" with X Factor 2008 runner's up JLS. One new recording entitled "You Don't Love Me" features a sample from Kim Wildes 1986 remake of the 60's motown classic "You Keep Me Hanging On" by The Supremes.

The album does not contain two of Lemar's Epic singles, "Don't Give It Up" and "Tick Tock", both of which were remixed from their respective album versions when they were released as singles. These single versions do not appear on any of Lemar's albums. The album also misses out his rare debut single "Got Me Saying Ooh".

== Promotion ==
The first single off the album was "The Way Love Goes." A second single taken from The Hits, "Coming Home," was released on 17 May 2010.

== Critical reception ==
Professional ratings
Review scores
| Source | Rating |
|---|---|
| AllMusic | 3.5/5 stars |

AllMusic editor Jon O'Brien noted that "losing out to David Sneddon might not have been the most auspicious start, but despite its occasional lapses into derivativeness, Hits is a solid body of work that ultimately proves it's not the winning that counts." Alex Fletcher from Digital Spy found that Lemar's "quality control may fall short over the course of these 15 tracks, but this isn't to say that there aren't some notable high points here. Lemar's greatest trick is penning and performing tracks which sound like covers of forgotten '70s R&B gems."

== Track listing ==
The Hits track listing
| No. | Title | Writer(s) | Producer(s) | Length |
|---|---|---|---|---|
| 1. | "Dance (With U)" | Lemar Obika; Craig Hardy; Fitzgerald Scott | Brian Rawling; Hardy | 3:08 |
| 2. | "50/50" | Obika; Hallgeir Rustan; Tor Erik Hermansen; Mikkel S. Eriksen | Stargate | 3:24 |
| 3. | "Another Day" | Scott; Skyler Sinclair; William Whedbee | Rawling; Paul Meehan | 4:02 |
| 4. | "Lullaby" | Obika; Ainslie Henderson | Cutfather & Joe | 3:22 |
| 5. | "If There's Any Justice" | Mick Leeson; Peter Vale | Rawling; Meehan | 3:49 |
| 6. | "Time to Grow" | Obika; Scott | Scott | 3:43 |
| 7. | "It's Not That Easy" | Frederik Friis; Glenn Tharaldsen; Lars Jensen; Lorne Tennant; Martin Larsson; Sigurd Jansen | Rawling; Meehan; Lemar | 3:25 |
| 8. | "Someone Should Tell You" | Obika; Paul Barry; Steve Torch | Rawling; Meehan; Lemar | 3:43 |
| 9. | "If She Knew" | Obika; Claude Kelly; Kenneth Karlin; Carsten Schack | Soulshock & Karlin | 4:08x |
| 10. | "Weight of the World" | Obika; Jim Jonsin; Louis Biancaniello; Sam Watters | Jonsin; Biancaniello; Watters | 4:20 |
| 11. | "Mayday" | Obika | Lemar | 3:37 |
| 12. | "The Way Love Goes" | Richard Stannard; Ash Howes; Steve Malcolmson | Stannard; Howes | 3:33 |
| 13. | "You Don't Love Me" | Obika; Bobby Knockz; Michael Anefils; Brian Holland; Eddie Holland; Lamont Dozier | Knockz; Anefils | 3:38 |
| 14. | "Coming Home" | Obika; Alonzo Mario Stevenson; Eric Stamile; Tony Reyes | Novel; Reyes^{[a]} | 3:44 |
| 15. | "What About Love?" (featuring JLS) | Obika; Scott | Fingaz | 3:39 |

Notes

- ^{^[a]} denotes a co-producer

== Charts ==
Weekly chart performance for The Hits
| Chart (2010) | Peak position |
|---|---|
| UK Albums (OCC) | 18 |

== Certifications ==
Certifications for The Hits
| Region | Certification | Certified units/sales |
|---|---|---|
| United Kingdom (BPI) | Silver | 60,000^{‡} |
^{‡} Sales+streaming figures based on certification alone.

== Release history ==
The Hits release history
| Region | Date | Format | Label | Ref(s) |
|---|---|---|---|---|
| United Kingdom | 8 March 2010 | Digital download; CD | Epic Records | |
