= Unwind =

Unwind may refer to:

- Unwind (novel), a 2007 science fiction novel by young adult literature author Neal Shusterman
- Stack unwinding

== Music ==
- Unwind (Oleander album) (2001)
- Unwind (VanVelzen album) (2007)
- Unwind, album by Inasense (2003)
- "Unwind", song by Pink from Try This (2003)
