= Steven Malcolmson =

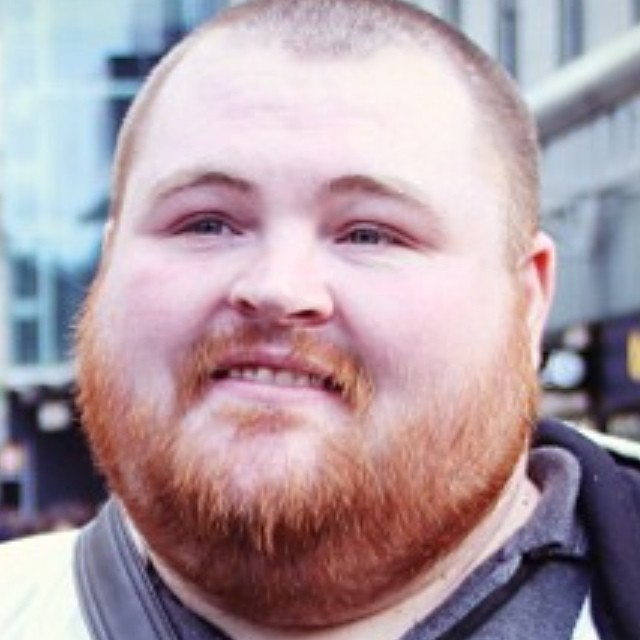

Background information
- Born: Steven Malcolmson; 9 April 1983 (age 43); Parkhead, Glasgow, Scotland
- Genre: Pop
- Occupations: Songwriter, singer, record producer, remixer
- Instruments: Keyboards, guitar, vocals, synthesizer
- Years active: 2010–present

Steven Malcolmson (born 9 April 1983) – also known as Steve Malcolmson, is a Scottish songwriter, record producer, originating from Glasgow, Scotland.

== Early life ==
Steven Malcolmson was born in Glasgow. He grew up in a council house, living in East End, Parkhead with his parents and siblings. Malcolmson attended Whitehill Secondary School, dropping out in the year 1998 as the music class was stopped due to a lack of funding.

== Career ==
He began creating music in his early teens, teaching himself guitar and piano from books, using software Cubase to create his earliest forms of music. Joining the band "theoceanfloor" at nineteen – and later "Co-pilot Effect" – led him to creating indie music. However he later developed a passion for pop. He got in touch with Richard "Biff" Stannard who was willing to mentor him.

== 2010–present: Steven Malcolmson ==
Steve wrote the song "The Way Love Goes" which was pitched to platinum selling artist Lemar. It became the lead single for Lemar's Greatest Hits album, with the song peaking at No. 8 on the UK Singles chart he was signed in 2010 to Major 3rd Music/BMG Rights Management. Writing with music production team Biffco he began to co-write for X Factor finalists.

He worked with Joe McElderry on his Wide Awake album with the song "Feel the Fire" as well as doing production work for Ellie Goulding on the single "Lights" which charted at No. 2 in the US. and No 49 in the UK. Steve also worked with Kylie Minogue on the song "Love Love Love" which was leaked onto video-sharing website YouTube resulting in the song not being featured on Kylie Minogue's Aphrodite album.

== Discography ==
Year	Artist	Tracks	Album	Role	UK Singles Chart position	US Singles Chart position
2010	Lemar	"The Way Love Goes"	The Hits	Writer	No. 8	–
2010	Ellie Goulding	"Lights"	Bright Lights	Programming	No. 49	No. 2
2010	Joe McElderry	"Feel the Fire"	Wide Awake	Writer	–	–
2010	Kylie Minogue	"Love Love Love"	–	Writer	–	–
2010	Alphabeat	"DJ (I Could Be Dancing)"	The Spell	Programming	No. 116	–
2014	Toni Etherson	"Born in the Wrong Generation"	Bright Side	Producer	–	–
