= Sven Garas =

Norwegian musician

Sven Garås (born 1978, Kongsberg, Norway) is a pop artist, songwriter and producer working out of Oslo, Norway. He has been running DJD Lydstudio since 2006 and works in several different genres using various pseudonyms. He has written songs with Norwegian songwriters such as Hanne Sørvaag, Christian Ingebrigtsen, Arne Moslåtten, Simen Fjeld and Tommy Berre. He has specialized in pop and electronic music, and has also written and produced music for commercials for clients such as Nike, VG and Dagbladet. In 2010 he was one of the jury members in the “Electronic Music” category at the Norwegian Grammys (Spellemannsprisen).

In 2006 he released his first single as an artist, "One of Those Days". The song was A-listed for fourteen consecutive weeks on the biggest local radio station group in Norway (Jærradiogruppen), with nationwide coverage. Following the success, a music video was directed by Howie Arnstad. The story played out on YouTube, and was shot in New York City and London, depicting an internet romance between British actor Chris Hogben and New York based dancer Kristina Skjelberg. It scored a listing on ZTV during the summer of 2007.

In 2007 he released the single "Choose to Live" which also made it to the playlists of the biggest radio stations in Norway NRK P1 and P4. A new music video was made, this time around filmed in London and directed by local talent Max Shaw. In this video, Garås played alongside Exeter model and Bollywood actress Zoe Szypillo.

At the start of 2008 he took part in the Norwegian preselection of the Eurovision Song Contest (called Melodi Grand Prix in Norway), performing a song called "I'm in Love". The song was released by Universal Music Norway. This year he also released the single "Baby Get Higher", a song written by Graham Stack, Mark Read and David Sneddon. On the production side he remixed "Robot Song" by Norwegian Idol star Margaret Berger together with DJ Jamie. The remix was released by Sony Music and soon picked up and supported by Tiesto, a renowned international DJ. Tiesto also played it on his weekly radio show (Radio 538) presenting it for several hundred thousand electronic music lovers all over the world.

In 2009 he joined forces with Reidar Buskenes remixing another one of Margaret Berger radio hits, "Samantha". Following their success the duo was in 2010 commissioned by Warner Music to remix "Sometimes" by Norwegian multiplatinum sellers Donkeyboy. The remix made it into the Norwegian Dance Charts, and was released worldwide together with a remix by infamous remixer Jason Nevins.

2010 also saw the release of Sven Garås pop rock album Choose to Live which also contained the single "Sommerlåt", the first he has sung in his native language.

== Discography ==
=== Albums ===
- 2010: Choose to Live

=== Singles ===
- 2006: "One of Those Days"
- 2007: "Choose to Live"
- 2008: "I'm in Love"
- 2008: "Baby Get Higher"
- 2010: "Sommerlåt"

As producer / remixer

(selective)

- Margaret Berger - "Robot Song" (remix with DJ Jamie).
- Margaret Berger - "Samantha" (with Reidar Buskenes)
- Donkeyboy - "Sometimes"
