= Fredrik Friis =

Norwegian singer-songwriter (1923–2008)

Background information
- Born: 2 April 1923; Sandefjord
- Died: 15 March 2008 (aged 84)
- Genres: Pop
- Occupation: Talent Scout
- Years active: 1940–2008

Hans Fredrik Friis-Olsen (2 April 1923 – 15 March 2008) was one of Norway's first talent scouts, music managers and producers. He was also a noted composer, lyricist and singer, producing more than 600 songs of his own.

Friis was one of the early pioneers in the Norwegian music business, even much underappreciated, discovering artists who would not only plague the national charts, but also seek international fame, at a time when Norway did not have any infrastructure, nor many plans for its music exportation. Most famous is Anita Hegerland. But also famous nationally are Teddy Nelson, Eivind Løberg, Gluntan and Ivar Simastuen. The latter made his recording debut in 1951.

Friis was born in Sandefjord, and his musical career started with a local performance when he was five years old. He bought a saxophone and started his first orchestra, Daisy Bell, in 1940. Friis made his first appearance on radio December 7, 1946, and became famous in 1948 with the song "Swinging Baby", which was performed in a show from Store Studio in NRK. He had his first appearance on Chat Noir in 1950 with Aud Schønemann, and the following year he was called by John Johanson in the record company Nera. Friis got a contract and made his debut in 1951 on the label Musica. Later he also published records on Philips and Columbia. His record production on his own counts twelve singles and three LPs, as well as an LP with Arnt Haugen.

Fredrik Friis has a large production of songs and lyrics behind him. He has over 600 songs recorded in the base of TONO.

Fredrik Friis has made his mark on Norwegian popular music for more than 50 years. In addition to his musical career, he has also worked as a welfare officer in the Navy and a social consultant in the Welfare Service for the merchant navy. He was for many years a social consultant in the Armed Forces Command, where he had the central responsibility for the Armed Forces' economic social service and the crew's living and welfare supplement schemes.

At the age of 83, he entered the British chart list when British soul artist Lemar used the tune "Eventyrlandet" which Friis composed for child artist Eivind Løberg in the 1970s. Lemar made the lyrics to Friis's tune under the name "It's Not That Easy". The song lay eleven weeks on the chart list in the fall of 2006, reaching seventh place.
