= Best of Order =

Single by David Sneddon

from the album Seven Years - Ten Weeks
- Released: 11 August 2003
- Recorded: 2003
- Genre: Pop
- Length: 3:22
- Label: Mercury Records
- Songwriters: David Sneddon, Scott MacAlister

David Sneddon singles chronology
"Don't Let Go" (2003)	"Best of Order" (2003)	"Baby Get Higher" (2003)

"Best of Order" is a song written by Scottish musician, singer and songwriter David Sneddon and Scott MacAlister. It was released as the third single from his debut album, Seven Years - Ten Weeks, on 11 August 2003 in the United Kingdom. It charted at No. 19 in the UK Singles Chart.

== Track listing ==
Both of the CD single releases featured the main song but CD 1 also included the music video. CD 2 contained a live version of his debut single, "Stop Living the Lie" and an acoustic version of "Fly", while CD1 included two new tracks, "I'm on Your Side" and "Wasting Your Life Away". CD 2 also had a live video of "Stop Living the Lie".

=== UK CD 1 ===
1. "Best of Order"
2. "I'm on Your Side"
3. "Wasting Your Life Away"
4. "Best of Order (music video)"

=== UK CD 2 ===
1. "Best of Order"
2. "Fly" (acoustic)
3. "Stop Living the Lie" (live)
4. "Stop Living the Lie" (live video)

== Chart positions ==
Country	Peak position
Scottish Singles Chart	5
UK Singles Chart	19
