= VanVelzen =

Dutch singer (born 1978)

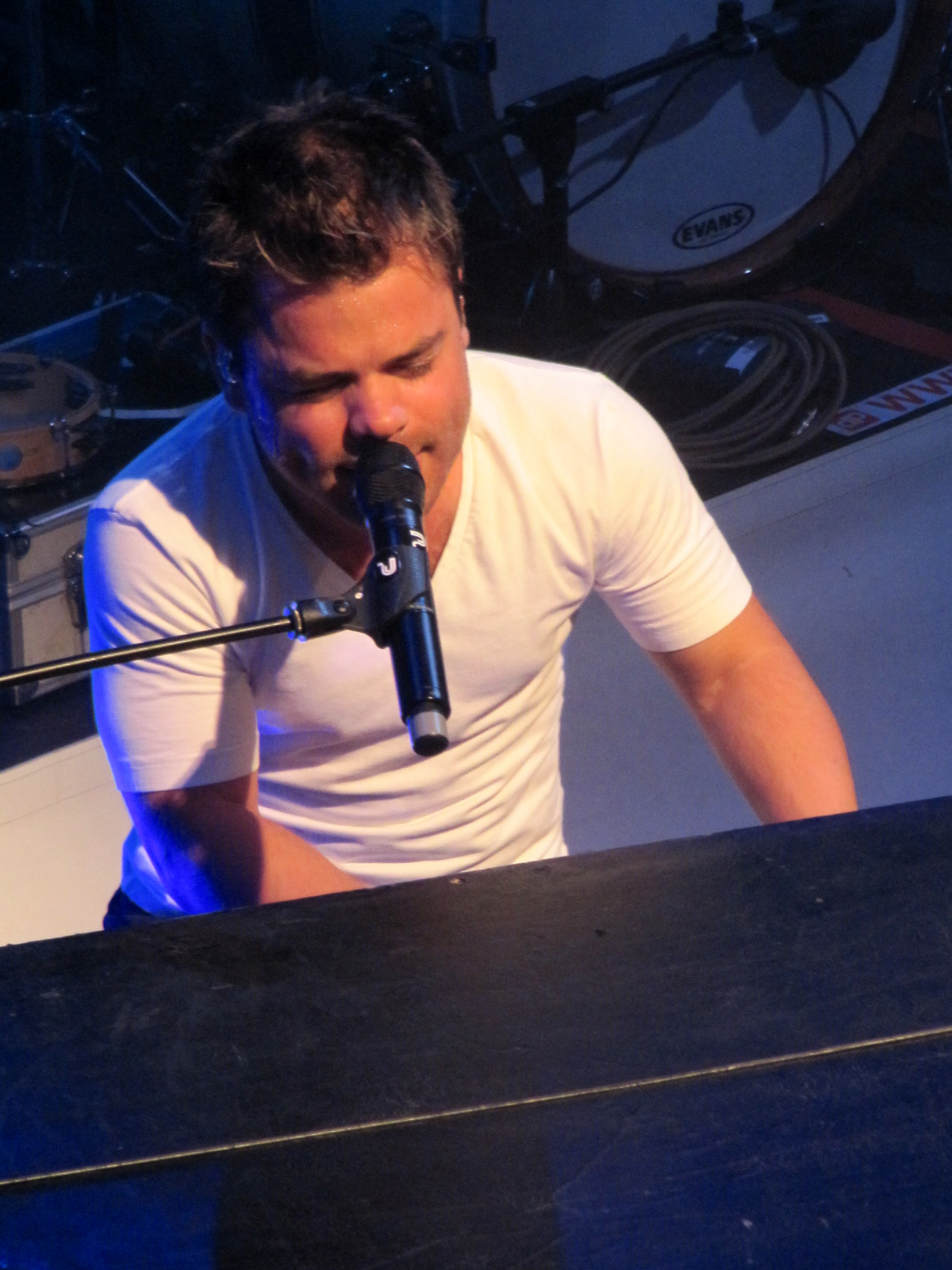

Background information
- Born: Roel van Velzen; 20 March 1978 (age 48); Delft, Netherlands
- Genres: Pop rock
- Occupations: Singer, songwriter, pianist
- Instruments: Vocals, piano, electric guitar, synthesizer
- Years active: 2006–present
- Label: Foreign Media Music
- Website: www.vanvelzenmusic.com

Roel van Velzen (Dutch pronunciation: [ˈrul vɑɱ ˈvɛlzə(n)]; born 20 March 1978), better known as VanVelzen, is a Dutch singer-songwriter. Besides being known for his short stature, he and his band enjoy a huge live reputation; they have played at virtually every festival in the Netherlands, shared the stage with Queen's Brian May, and supported Kelly Clarkson, Bon Jovi and German band Reamonn. He also had an international airplay hit when DJ Armin van Buuren remixed VanVelzen's song "Broken Tonight".

== Early life ==
Van Velzen was born in Delft, The Netherlands. His father was a musician, and had a large influence on him as a child. On his sixth birthday, his mother's present was a drum kit. The young Van Velzen was actively involved in several bands at school and wrote music for the annual Christmas musical. He went on to study Creative Communications at the Inholland College of Applied Sciences in Rotterdam, and won the Heineken Student Music Award in 1999 with his band The Goldfish.

He went on to play with Crazy Pianos and during a concert at the GelreDome, he met his current manager, Ruud H. Vinke. Between 2002 and 2005, he was part of the improv theatre group Op Sterk Water, with whom he performed twice at the Lowlands Festival.

In early 2005, VanVelzen was introduced to Dutch music producers Holger Schwedt, Nando Eweg and John Ewbank, and they decided to start working on an album.

== Career ==
=== 2006–2007: Breakthrough and Unwind ===
VanVelzen's first single, "Baby Get Higher", was a cover of songwriter David Sneddon's 2003 single, and peaked at No. 17 on the Dutch Top 40 and the song was also a big radio airplay hit.

His second single, "Burn" was released in January 2007 and was a top 10 hit in The Netherlands. His debut album, Unwind, followed shortly afterwards on 16 March and was a phenomenal all-round hit, debuting at number one on the Dutch charts and remained in the charts for over a year. It won several awards, including the 3FM Award for Best Newcomer, and Best Album at the 2007 TMF Awards.

There were two more singles from the album; "Deep" and "Shine a Little Light" were both released in May 2007.

=== 2008–2009: Take Me In and Hear Me Out ===
VanVelzen went on to have a sell-out tour in The Netherlands in 2008 and introduced fans to his new single, "When Summer Ends". The song, which was released in January 2008, VanVelzen wrote with John Ewbank, was the theme song for the summer movie Summer Heat and is VanVelzen's highest chart hit to date, peaking at No. 6. The song was nominated for an Edison Award in 2009.

Aside from his own tour, VanVelzen opened for various large acts throughout 2008, including Kelly Clarkson at the Heineken Music Hall and Bon Jovi at the Amsterdam ArenA, as well as several smaller festivals throughout the Netherlands. That year, 3FM gave him the award for Best Live Act.

Towards the end of 2008, several German radio stations began to pick up on VanVelzen's music, particularly "Baby Get Higher", which was used for a TV commercial and peaked at No. 30 on the German airplay charts. He recorded a new video especially for the German market at the end of 2008.

2009 saw the release of the second single from the forthcoming second album. "On My Way" was released on 15 January 2009 and peaked at No. 29. The second album was released in two parts; Take Me In was released in May and Hear Me Out followed in September. The two-part was eventually certified Gold in 2010. "Love Song" became the third single from the album and was a huge summer hit in the Netherlands that year.

In the autumn of 2009, DJ Armin van Buuren remixed and released "Broken Tonight", one of the songs from the new album, and the track became a hit in several countries outside of the Netherlands, including making No. 18 in the United States' Hot Dance Chart.

=== 2010–2011: The Voice of Holland ===
In 2010, VanVelzen was invited to be a judge on The Voice of Holland, a new style of talent shows with 'Blind Auditions', where the judges hear the voice of the artist without seeing their face, a concept that was thought up by VanVelzen himself. VanVelzen went on to mentor the 2010 winner, Ben Saunders. VanVelzen returned for the second and third season. After that, VanVelzen announced he would not be returning for the fourth season in 2013.

Towards the end of 2010, VanVelzen embarked on a 34-date Hear Me Out theatre tour of the Netherlands and sold out every venue.

On 3 March, VanVelzen received the prestigious Dutch music award, the Golden Harp, for his contribution to Dutch pop music, becoming one of only 42 artists to ever have done so.

In May, VanVelzen released the first single from his forthcoming album called "Too Good to Lose".

=== 2012–present: The Rush of Life ===
In 2012, the album The Rush of Life was released, and three further singles followed: "The Rush of Life", "Cross Your Heart" and "Sing Sing Sing". VanVelzen and band took the album out on the road during a 50+ date theatre tour (including a reprise tour) in 2012 and 2013, and often played in front of a sold-out crowd.

In November 2013, a new single "The Blessed Days" was released, as the title track to the Dutch romantic comedy movie Soof. The video to the song is a re-make of Billy Ocean's "When the Going Gets Tough" and features the main characters of the movie, including choreographer Dan Karaty. The video won the 100% NL TV AWARD for 'best video of the year 2013'.

== Personal life ==
VanVelzen married his girlfriend Marloes on 1 January 2011. On his Twitter account, he claimed the marriage occurred in the first minute of the new year. They had their first son in February 2012, and a second in April 2013.

== Discography ==
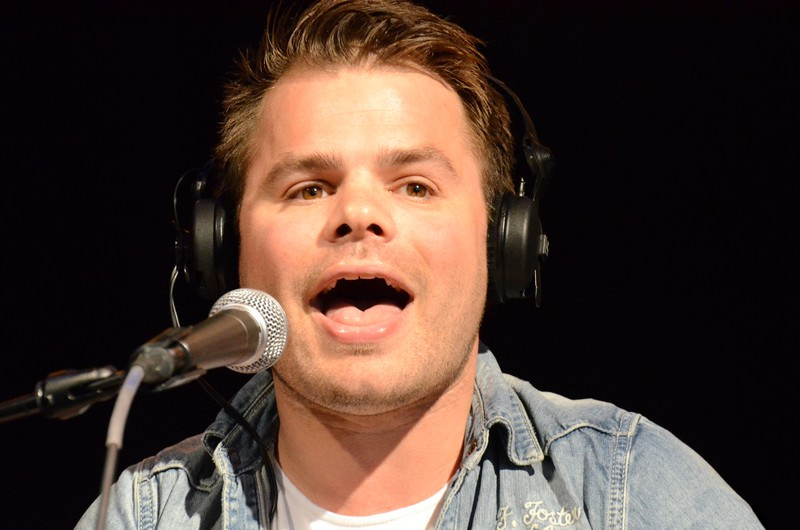
VanVelzen

=== Albums ===
Year	Album	Peak position	
Year	Album	Dutch Album Top 100	Flemish Ultratop 200
2007	Unwind	1	
2009	Take Me In	8	
2009	Hear Me Out	9	
2010	Chasing the Sun		79
2012	The Rush of Life	4	
2015	Call It Luck	13	

=== Singles ===
Year	Single	Album	Peak position	
Year	Single	Album	Dutch Top 40	Dutch Top 100
2006	"Baby Get Higher"	Unwind	17	26
2006	"Burn"	Unwind	7	14
2007	"Deep"	Unwind	17	42
2007	"Shine A Little Light"	Unwind	46	72
2008	"When Summer Ends"	Hear Me Out	6	6
2009	"On My Way"	Take Me In	29	16
2009	"Love Song"	Take Me In	20	9
2009	"Other Side Of Me"	Hear Me Out	44	8
2009	"Broken Tonight"	Hear Me Out	33	63
2010	"Take Me In"	Take Me In	25	68
2011	"Too Good To Lose"	The Rush Of Life	42	45
2012	"The Rush Of Life"	The Rush Of Life	26	16
2012	"Cross Your Heart"	The Rush Of Life	47	50
