= Invincible (Lemar song) =

Single by Lemar

from the album Invincible
- Released: 12 August 2012
- Length: 3:14
- Label: Angelic Media Limited
- Songwriters: Philip Hochstrate; Marcus Killian; Lemar
- Producer: Lemar

Lemar singles chronology
"Coming Home" (2010)	"Invincible" (2012)	"The First Time" (2012)

"Invincible" is a song by English singer Lemar from his same-titled fifth studio album (2012). It was released as the album's lead single in the United Kingdom as a digital download on 12 August 2012. The song peaked at number 158 on the UK Singles Chart.

== Background ==
Talking about the song Lemar said in an interview with Digital Spy: "Sticking together is what makes you invincible. When times are hard, it's important to stick together and know what your values are." The track was recorded in sessions that took place in London and Los Angeles.

== Music video ==
A music video to accompany the release of "Invincible" was first released onto YouTube on 20 July 2012 at a total length of three minutes and twenty-three seconds. The video tells the story of the star's childhood love and the pair's developing relationship up until the present day.

== Track listing ==
Digital single
No.	Title	Writer(s)	Producer(s)	Length
1.	"Invincible"	Obika; Marcus Killian; Philip Hochstrate	Lemar; Killian^{[a]}; Hochstrate^{[a]}	3:14
2.	"Invincible" (Acoustic)	Obika; Marcus Killian; Philip Hochstrate	Lemar; Killian^{[a]}; Hochstrate^{[a]}	3:13
3.	"Invincible" (Moto Blanco Edit)	Obika; Marcus Killian; Philip Hochstrate	Lemar; Killian^{[a]}; Hochstrate^{[a]}; Moto Blanco^{[b]}	3:37
4.	"Invincible" (Moto Blanco Remix)	Obika; Marcus Killian; Philip Hochstrate	Lemar; Killian^{[a]}; Hochstrate^{[a]}; Blanco^{[b]}	7:23

Notes

- ^{^[a]} denotes additional producer
- ^{^[b]} denotes remix producer

== Charts ==
Weekly chart performance for "Invincible"
Chart (2012)	Peak position
UK Singles (OCC)	158

== Release history ==
Release history for "Invincible"
Region	Date	Format	Label
United Kingdom	12 August 2012	Digital Download	Angelic Media Limited
