= Scott MacAlister =

Scottish songwriter

Scott MacAlister is a Scottish songwriter. His credits include the hits "Don't Let Go" and "Best of Order" by David Sneddon, both songs feature on Sneddon's album, Seven Years – Ten Weeks.

== Scottish Singles Chart ==
Chart Position	Song	Artist	Writer
Number 1	Don't Let Go	David Sneddon	MacAlister/Sneddon
Number 5	Best of Order	David Sneddon	MacAlister/Sneddon

== Scottish Albums Chart ==
Chart Position	BPI Certification	Album	Artist	Songs	Writer
Number 1	Gold	Seven Years – Ten Weeks	David Sneddon	Don't Let Go	MacAlister/Sneddon
			David Sneddon	Best of Order	MacAlister/Sneddon

== UK Singles Chart ==
Chart Position	Song	Artist	Writer
Number 3	Don't Let Go	David Sneddon	MacAlister/Sneddon
Number 19	Best of Order	David Sneddon	MacAlister/Sneddon

== Digital Songs Released ==
Artist	Song	Writer
Sonia Bettencourt	Angel	MacAlister
Sonia Bettencourt	Undeniable	MacAlister
Sonia Bettencourt	Make A Stand	MacAlister
Sharron Boyle	Because You Are Mine	MacAlister/McKenzie
The Ramblin Man	Long Train Coming	MacAlister
Max de Vries	Don't Stop	MacAlister/McKenzie

== UK Albums Chart ==
Chart Position	BPI Certification	Album	Artist	Songs	Writer
Number 5	Gold	Seven Years – Ten Weeks	David Sneddon	Don't Let Go	MacAlister/Sneddon
			David Sneddon	Best of Order	MacAlister/Sneddon

== UK Compilation Chart ==
Chart Position	BPI Certification	Album	Artist	Songs	Writer
Number 1	2× Platinum	Now That's What I Call Music! 55	David Sneddon	Don't Let Go	MacAlister/Sneddon
		Magic Summer Feeling	David Sneddon	Don't Let Go	MacAlister/Sneddon
	Silver	Smash Hits Chart Summer	David Sneddon	Don't Let Go	MacAlister/Sneddon
		Top of the Pops Summer 2003	David Sneddon	Best of Order	MacAlister/Sneddon
		Haiti, We Are There For You	Sonia Bettencourt	Make A Stand	MacAlister
