= Coming Home (Lemar song) =

Single by Lemar

from the album The Hits
- Released: 16 May 2010
- Recorded: 2009
- Genre: R&B, Soul, dance-pop
- Length: 3:44
- Label: Epic
- Songwriter(s): Lemar, Alonzo Mario Stevenson, Eric Stamile, Tony Reyes
- Producer(s): Novel

Lemar singles chronology
"The Way Love Goes" (2010)	"Coming Home" (2010)	"Invincible" (2012)

"Coming Home" is the second single taken from British R&B singer Lemar's first compilation album The Hits. The single was released via digital download on 16 May 2010 and also featured a remix by Roll Deep.

== Background ==
"Coming Home" was recorded especially for Lemar's The Hits album. It was written by Lemar in collaboration with Alonzo Mario Stevenson, Eric Stamile and Tony Reyes.

== Music video ==
The music video for "Coming Home" was shot during the week beginning 17 March 2010 and was directed by Rage, who also shot the video for Lemar's previous single "The Way Love Goes".

== Track listing ==
UK Digital Download

1. "Coming Home" (Radio Edit) - 3:38
2. "Coming Home" (Roll Deep Remix) - 3:29
3. "Coming Home" (Roll Deep Remix featuring Sratchy & Breeze) - 3:25
4. "Coming Home" (Video) (iTunes bundle only)
