= Louis Biancaniello =

American songwriter and record producer

Louis John Biancaniello is an American songwriter and record producer.

== Career ==
Biancaniello's skills were developed while working alongside producer Narada Michael Walden with whom he produced hits for Shanice I Love Your Smile, Whitney Houston I'm Every Woman from the Grammy winning album The Bodyguard and All the Man That I Need, Tevin Campbell Tell Me What You Want Me to Do, Elton John "True Love", Lisa Fischer "How Can I Ease The Pain", Al Jarreau the Grammy winning "Heaven and Earth", and various other tracks from artist such as Mariah Carey, Edyta Górniak, The O'Jay's, Aretha Franklin, Barbra Streisand, Taylor Dayne, and Al Green.

On 6 December 2007, Biancaniello was nominated for 2 Grammy Awards: Best R&B Song for his songwriting credits on "When I See U" and Best Contemporary R&B Album of the year for his production credits on "Fantasia". In April 2008 "Take a Bow" and "Yesterday" were released on Leona Lewis's debut album titled "Spirit".

Biancaniello collaborates frequently with Sam Watters. The pair have written and produced hits for Jessica Simpson "I Wanna Love You Forever", for Alexia "You need love", "I Believe", performed by Fantasia Barrino, "I'm Outta Love" and "One Day in Your Life" performed by Anastacia. Recently the two have had chart success with Fantasia's No. 1 Billboard R&B hit "When I See You", Natasha Bedingfield's "Love Like This", Jordin Sparks "Battlefield" and Kelly Clarkson's "All I Ever Wanted". Recent releases also include tracks on new Leona Lewis and Westlife's "Back Home". They are also known for their work with Keri Hilson, Celine Dion, Marc Anthony, Lara Fabian, Edyta Górniak, 98 Degrees, Color Me Badd, Elliott Yamin and Tamyra Gray. In 2010, Biancaniello and Watters met the artist Matthew Koma. Biancaniello and Watters began working with Matthew Koma, and eventually signed him to their production company, London Police. Matthew Koma has enjoyed early success with guest vocals on "Spectrum" by Zedd featuring Matthew Koma, and "Years" by Alesso featuring Matthew Koma, both of which reached No. 1 on Beatport. Koma opened for LMFAO on their international tour.

In 2011, Biancaniello and Watters signed their 2nd artist, Marley Munroe. In January 2012, they signed her to Epic Records through their London Police imprint. As of 2016, her only release has been a promotional single.

== The Runaways ==
In addition to his solo projects, Biancaniello has joined forces with producers/songwriters Sam Watters, Rico Love, and Wayne Wilkins to form the writing and production team The Runaways. Together they wrote and produced "Love Like This" by Natasha Bedingfield featuring Sean Kingston on Natasha Bedingfield's Pockets Full of Sunshine. In 2008, they released Keri Hilson's first single, "Energy" off of her debut album In A Perfect World.... The Runaways produced and wrote the 2009 hit "Battlefield" for Jordin Sparks. Biancaniello co-produced Lemar's second single, "Weight of the World", from his fourth album The Reason with Jim Jonsin. Biancaniello and Watters produced four and wrote and produced three songs including the title track on Kelly Clarkson's 2009 All I Ever Wanted album.

In 2009 Biancaniello and Watters wrote and produced the first single "Forever Is Over" for UK girl group The Saturdays, with James Bourne. They also wrote and produced two songs on Alexandra Burke's debut album Overcome, including the title track, and "Rain on Me" on Cheryl Cole's debut, and wrote and produced two songs and produced a third on Westlife's "Where We Are" album. The year also saw the pair co-write and produce nine songs for Universal Republic's new artist Kate Earl.

In 2010 Louis co-wrote and produced Jordin Sparks hit "Battlefield". In 2012–13 Louis put his energy into developing the artists Mathew Koma who got signed to Interscope and Marley Munroe who got signed to Epic. In 2014 Biancaniello co-wrote and produced the 5 Seconds of Summer hit "Amnesia". Other notable releases in 2014 include Jessie J's "Keep Us Together" and Anastacia's first 2 singles "Stupid Little Things" and "Staring at the Sun".

== Discography ==
All Music Discography
