= Don't Let Go (David Sneddon song) =

2003 single by David Sneddon

Single by David Sneddon

from the album Seven Years – Ten Weeks
- B-side: "She Needs to Know"; "The Longest Time"; "Smile Again"
- Released: 21 April 2003
- Length: 3:58
- Label: Mercury
- Songwriters: Scott MacAlister, David Sneddon
- Producer: Hugh Padgham

David Sneddon singles chronology
"Stop Living the Lie" (2002)	"Don't Let Go" (2003)	"Best of Order" (2003)

Alternative cover
- UK CD 2 cover

"Don't Let Go" is a song by Scottish singer-songwriter David Sneddon, released as a single on 21 April 2003. Written by Sneddon and Scott MacAlister, the song reached No. 3 on the UK Singles Chart and No. 36 in Ireland. It was the second single and follow up to Sneddon's debut number-one hit, "Stop Living the Lie".

The song was included on Sneddon's debut album, Seven Years – Ten Weeks. The B-sides to this song – "She Needs to Know", "The Longest Time" and "Smile Again" – did not appear on the album.

== Track listings ==
UK CD1

1. "Don't Let Go"
2. "She Needs to Know"
3. "The Longest Time"
4. "Don't Let Go" (CD-ROM video)

UK CD2

1. "Don't Let Go"
2. "Smile Again"
3. "Stop Living the Lie" (CD-ROM video)

UK cassette single

1. "Don't Let Go"
2. "Smile Again"

== Charts ==
=== Weekly charts ===
Chart (2003)	Peak position
Europe (Eurochart Hot 100)	14
Ireland (IRMA)	36
Scotland Singles (OCC)	1
UK Singles (OCC)	3

=== Year-end charts ===
Chart (2003)	Position
UK Singles (OCC)	143
