= Seven Years – Ten Weeks =

Studio album by David Sneddon
- Released: 28 April 2003
- Recorded: 2003
- Genre: Pop; pop rock; acoustic
- Label: Mercury
- Producer: Hugh Padgham; Nigel Lowis; Paul Meehan; Graham Stack; Gus Dudgeon

David Sneddon chronology
Seven Years – Ten Weeks (2003)	White Noise (2007)

Singles from Seven Years – Ten Weeks
- 1. "Stop Living the Lie" Released: 13 January 2003; 2. "Don't Let Go" Released: 21 April 2003; 3. "Best of Order" Released: 11 August 2003; 4. "Baby Get Higher" Released: 27 October 2003

Seven Years – Ten Weeks is the debut and only studio album released by former Fame Academy winner David Sneddon. Released on 28 April 2003, the album was recorded on the back of the success of Sneddon's winner's single, the self-penned "Stop Living the Lie", which peaked at #1 on the UK Singles Chart, and went on to become the eighteenth highest-selling single of the year. The album's second single, "Don't Let Go", was released a week prior to the album on 21 April.

On 27 April 2003, the album was launched with a special campaign during which David performed seven gigs in ten hours across several towns and cities in Scotland.

The album peaked at #5 on the UK Albums Chart, before falling to #18 the following week. Two further singles were released; "Best of Order", on 11 August 2003, and "Baby Get Higher", the lead single from a planned re-release of the album, which failed to materialise after the single's lacklustre chart performance, only peaking at #38.

== Production ==
The album was composed entirely by Sneddon, with two tracks co-written with Scott MacAlister, and four co-written with John Kielty of The Martians. Sneddon claimed his inspirations for the album included the seven years after leaving university, performing on stage in Scotland and his ten-week journey as a contestant on Fame Academy. The album was executively produced by Hugh Padgham, known for his work with Phil Collins and Peter Gabriel in the 1980s, and was recorded with members of Elton John's backing band over a two-month period from February to March 2003.

== Singles ==
- "Stop Living the Lie" was released as the album's lead single on 13 January 2003, also serving as Sneddon's winner's single from his time on Fame Academy. The single charted at #1 on the UK Singles Chart. Notably, it was one of the first self-penned songs by the winner of a television talent show, with Pop Idol contestants Will Young and Gareth Gates both opting to release covers as their debut singles.
- "Don't Let Go" was released as the album's second single on 21 April 2003. It became Sneddon's second top-ten hit, peaking at #3 on the UK Singles Chart.
- "Best of Order" was released as the third and final single from the album on 11 August 2003, peaking at #19 in the UK.
- "Baby Get Higher", the lead single from a planned re-release of the album, was released on 27 October 2003, peaking at #38 in the UK. Due to the single's poor chart performance, the re-release of the album was cancelled.

== Track listing ==
No.	Title	Writer(s)	Length
1.	"Best of Order"	David Sneddon; Scott MacAlister	4:37
2.	"Time to Fall Down"	Sneddon	3:58
3.	"Stop Living the Lie"	Sneddon	3:57
4.	"All My Life"	Sneddon	4:34
5.	"Follow Me"	Sneddon	3:26
6.	"Don't Let Go"	David Sneddon; Scott MacAlister	4:26
7.	"The Bluebird"	Sneddon; John Kielty	4:12
8.	"Lazy"	Sneddon	4:59
9.	"OK"	Sneddon; Kielty	4:32
10.	"Without You"	Sneddon	5:22
11.	"Neverland"	Sneddon; Kielty	3:23
12.	"Long Time Coming"	Sneddon; Kielty	5:08
13.	"I Love You" (hidden track)	Sneddon	3:55
14.	"Stop Living the Lie" (music video)
15.	"Don't Let Go" (music video)

Seven Years — Ten Weeks — B-Sides
No.	Title	Writer(s)	Length
1.	"Goodnight Girl"	Marti Pellow; Graeme Clark; Tommy Cunningham; Neil Mitchell
2.	"Don't Let the Sun Go Down on Me" (acoustic session)	Elton John; Bernie Taupin
3.	"She Needs to Know"	Sneddon	4:27
4.	"The Longest Time"	Sneddon	3:03
5.	"Smile Again"	David Ramsey; Pauline Ramsey
6.	"I'm on Your Side"	Sneddon; Kielty	4:09
7.	"Wasting Your Life Away"	Sneddon; Kielty	4:47
8.	"Fly" (live acoustic session)
9.	"Baby Get Higher"	Sneddon; Mark Read; Graham Stack
10.	"Love Actually" (acoustic session)	Sneddon; Kielty
11.	"I'm Fine" (acoustic session)

== Personnel ==
Guitar: Boz Boorer, Davey Johnstone, Chris Leonard, Dominic Miller (+mandolin), John Kielty (acoustic)
Bass: Bob Birch, Jamie Mein
Drums: Aaron Fagan, John Mahon, Nigel Olsson
Percussion: Aaron Fagan, John Mahon, Wix Wickens
Keyboards: Guy Babylon, Wix Wickens
Backing Vocals: Margo Buchanan, Michelle John Douglas, John Kielty, Tessa Niles, Jackie Rawe

== Charts ==
Chart (2003)	Peak position
Scottish Albums (OCC)	1
UK Albums (OCC)	5
