= The Way Love Goes (Lemar song) =

Single by Lemar

from the album The Hits
- Released: 14 February 2010 (Digital download); 15 February 2010 (CD single)
- Recorded: 2009
- Genre: R&B; dance-pop; soul
- Length: 3:32
- Label: Epic
- Songwriter(s): Richard Stannard, Ash Howes, Steve Malcolmson
- Producer(s): Richard 'Biff' Stanard

Lemar singles chronology
| "Weight of the World" (2009) | "The Way Love Goes" (2010) | "Coming Home" (2010) |

"The Way Love Goes" is the first single taken from British R&B singer Lemar's first compilation album The Hits. The song received a digital download release on 14 February 2010, while a physical CD was released the following day.

== Background ==
Speaking to noted UK R&B writer Pete Lewis of the award-winning Blues & Soul, Lemar explained the background to 'The Way Love Goes': "With my 'The Hits' album being a celebration of what I've done so far as well as being a look into what I want to do in the future, I didn't want the first single to be too serious. So, while lyrically the topic of the song is love and there is a serious thread going through it, sonically I wanted the actual track to be light-hearted, upbeat and different to what some people have become accustomed to from me. You know, after songs like 'If There's Any Justice' and 'It's Not That Easy', I think people just got used to hearing me in that very old skool soul style and maybe forgot about earlier songs like 'Dance (With U)' and '50/50'. So, with 'The Way Love Goes', I just wanted to flip it and to show people there is another side to me - as well as coming with a live upbeat track to help create a celebration-type vibe for the album."

== Critical reception ==
Fraser McAlpine of BBC Chart Blog gave the song a positive review stating:

OK, I give in. King Cnut had to find out his limits the hard way and so, it seems, do I. If a man with a singing voice of as unmistakably high a quality as Lemar's can resort to a bit of autotune, everyone else might as well opt for a robo-tracheotomy and have done with it.

At least he's using it well, following the Cher model, where you slightly and subtly androiderise your all-too meaty voice so that it sits better among the unyielding electronica. It's a bit like having a USB port soldered into your neck. Slightly painful, but a useful way to get two different operating systems to interface effectively*.

The other model is to use it as a kind of robo-polyfilla, where all vocal cracks are given a smooth metallic outer coating because the voice inside would simply collapse without it. If asked, all singers and producers will claim that this model does not actually exist, and that they are all dabbling with this hot new production technique for genuine artistic reasons. And because everyone else is. The song was awarded a 4 star.

== Music video ==
The music video for The Way Love Goes was shot by LUT! MED!A director Rage on December 11, 2009, and premiered online on The Sun Website on January 14, 2010.

== Track listing ==
UK CD Single

1. The Way Love Goes - 3:32
2. You Got Me - 3:03

== Remixes ==
- The Way Love Goes (Full Phatt Remix) (featuring Mz Bratt)
- The Way Love Goes (Cahill Club Dub)
- The Way Love Goes (Cahill Radio Edit)

== Chart performance ==
"The Way Love Goes" entered the UK Singles Chart on 21 February 2010 and peaked at number 8. This made it his first Top 10 single since "It's Not That Easy" in 2006 and his seventh Top 10 single, with the song spending four weeks in the top 40 overall. The single was also a top ten hit on the Scottish Singles Chart, peaking at number 10. As of 2021, it remains his last UK Top 40 hit.

| Chart (2010) | Peak Position |
|---|---|
| European Hot 100 Singles | 33 |
| Scottish Singles | 10 |
| UK Singles (OCC) | 8 |
