= Baby Get Higher =

2003 single by David Sneddon

Single by David Sneddon
- Released: 27 October 2003
- Recorded: 2003
- Genre: Pop
- Length: 4:00
- Label: Mercury
- Songwriters: David Sneddon, Graham Stack, Mark Read

David Sneddon singles chronology
"Best of Order" (2003)	"Baby Get Higher" (2003)

Alternative cover
- UK CD 2 cover

Baby Get Higher is a song written by Scottish musician, singer and songwriter David Sneddon. This song written by Sneddon with Graham Stack and Mark Read was his fourth single release and it was not featured on his debut album Seven Years - Ten Weeks (although it was planned to be on a rerelease of the album, but this was cancelled following the single's poor performance). The single was released on 27 October 2003 in the United Kingdom and charted at No.38 in the UK Singles Chart. The song has been covered by Dutch singer VanVelzen and as a dancing hit by Azerbaijani singer Emin Agalarov known as Emin.

== Track listing ==
Both of the CD single releases featured the main song and a version of the music video. CD 2 contained an acoustic performance of one of his earlier releases, "Best of Order".

UK CD 1

1. "Baby Get Higher"
2. "Love Actually"
3. "Follow Me (acoustic)"
4. "Baby Get Higher (music video)"

UK CD 2

1. "Baby Get Higher"
2. "I'm Fine" (acoustic)
3. "Best of Order" (acoustic)
4. "Baby Get Higher" (directors cut video)

== Charts ==
Country	Peak position
UK Singles Chart	38

== Covers ==
The song has been subject to various interpretations, notably a dance mix version by Almighty Records, an English electronic dance music record label, covers by Dutch singer VanVelzen in 2006, the Swedish singer Sven Garas in 2008 and by Azerbaijani / Russian singer Emin in 2012.

Lenny Keylard, a contestant in season 1 of the Dutch competition The Voice of Holland interpreted a reggae version of the song.

=== VanVelzen version ===
"Baby Get Higher"

Single by VanVelzen

from the album Unwind
- Released: 26 September 2006
- Recorded: 2006
- Genre: Pop
- Length: 3:59
- Label: Foreign record label
- Songwriters: David Sneddon, Graham Stack, Mark Read
- Producers: Holger Schwedt, Nando Eweg

VanVelzen singles chronology
"Baby Get Higher" (2006)	"Burn" (2006)

Music video
- "Baby Get Higher" on YouTube

"Baby Get Higher" was also the debut single for Dutch singer VanVelzen, reaching No. 17 on the Dutch Top 40 and making it to the Top 30 on Single Top 100.

==== Track list ====
1. "Baby Get Higher" (3:59)
2. "I'll Stand Tall" (4:03)

==== Charts ====
Chart (2006)	Peak position
Netherlands (Dutch Top 40)	17
Netherlands (Single Top 100)	26

=== Emin version ===
"Baby Get Higher"

Single by Emin

from the album After the Thunder
- Released: 2012
- Recorded: 2012
- Genre: Pop
- Length: 3:28
- Label: Saffron Music
- Songwriters: David Sneddon, Graham Stack, Mark Read
- Producers: Brian Rawling; Paul Meehan

Music video
- "Baby Get Higher" on YouTube

Azerbaijani singer Emin Agalarov better known by the mononym Emin also released the song from his 2012 studio album After the Thunder. The single received BBC Radio 2 airplay.

In May 2012, Emin performed the song as one of the local [Azeri] guest artists at the 2012 Eurovision Song Contest held in Baku, Azerbaijan.
