= Unwind (VanVelzen album) =

Studio album by VanVelzen
- Released: 2007

VanVelzen chronology
Unwind (2007)	Take Me In (2009)

Unwind is the 2007 debut album from Dutch singer-songwriter VanVelzen. The album was one of the biggest successes of 2007 in the Netherlands.

== Track list ==
1. Unwind
2. Baby Get Higher
3. Burn
4. Waiting for the End
5. I'll Stand Tall
6. Rise
7. Deep
8. When Summer Ends
9. Chasing the Sun
10. Fool for Life
11. Shine a Little Light
12. Someday
13. One Angry Dwarf (bonus track; Ben Folds Five cover)

== Charts ==
=== Weekly charts ===
Chart (2007)	Peak position
Dutch Albums (Album Top 100)	1

=== Year-end charts ===
Chart (2007)	Position
Dutch Albums (Album Top 100)	39
Chart (2008)	Position
Dutch Albums (Album Top 100)	93
