= Time to Grow =

Studio album by Lemar
- Released: 29 November 2004
- Length: 48:34
- Label: Sony BMG
- Producers: Deekay; First Man; Paul Jervier; Steve Jervier; Lemar; Brian McKnight; Paul Meehan; Wirlie "Wyl-e" Morris; Obi & Josh; Mike Pela; Brian Rawling; Fitzgerald Scott; Soulpower; Soulshock & Karlin; Marcus Killian Thompson; Andy Whitmore

Lemar chronology
Dedicated (2003)	Time to Grow (2004)	The Truth About Love (2006)

Singles from Time to Grow
- 1. "If There's Any Justice" Released: 15 November 2004; 2. "Time to Grow" Released: 28 March 2005; 3. "Don't Give It Up" Released: 1 August 2005

Time to Grow is the second studio album by English singer Lemar. It was released by Sony BMG on 29 November 2004 in the United Kingdom. The album has been certified double platinum by the British Phonographic Industry (BPI).

== Critical reception ==
Professional ratings
Review scores
Source	Rating
AllMusic	4/5 stars
The Guardian	3/5 stars
The Independent	2.5/5 stars
Yahoo! Music UK	7/10

Caroline Sullivan from The Guardian found that after "a dismissable first album," Time to Grow "will divest [Lemar] of the reality-TV albatross. The single "If There's Any Justice" [...] is a yearning piece of trad-soul that gives the rest of the album something to live up to. By and large, it does." AllMusic rated the album four stars out of five.

== Track listing ==
Time to Grow track listing
No.	Title	Writer(s)	Producer(s)	Length
1.	"Soulman" (Intro)	Lemar Obika; Adam Midgeley; Fitzgerald Scott; Bradley Reddington	First Man Productions	3:18
2.	"Better Than This"	Andy Whitmore; Darren Brown; Giles Craig; Obika; Paul Jervier; Steve Jervier	Whitmore; P. Jervier; S. Jervier	3:22
3.	"I Don't Mind That"	Dicky Klein; Johannes Jørgensen; Obika	Deekay	3:34
4.	"What If?"	Alex Cantrall; Carsten Schack; Kenneth Karlin; Obika; Phillip "Silky" White	Soulshock & Karlin; Obi & Josh	3:28
5.	"Call Me Daddy"	Karsten Dahlgaard; Obika; Peter Biker	Soulpower Productions	3:19
6.	"If There's Any Justice"	Mick Leeson; Peter Vale	Paul Meehan; Brian Rawling	3:49
7.	"Don't Give It Up"	D. Brown; Obika; T. Brown; Wirlie "Wyl-e" Morris	Morris	3:43
8.	"Time to Grow"	Scott; Obika	Scott	3:43
9.	"Complicated Cupid"	Obika; Morris	Morris	3:37
10.	"Maybe Just Maybe"	Obika; Brian McKnight	McKnight	3:35
11.	"Feels Right"	D. Brown; Obika; T. Brown	Mike Pela	4:09
12.	"All I Ever Do"/"My Boo (Part II)"	Whitmore; Obika; P. Jervier; S. Jervier	Whitmore; P. Jervier; S. Jervier	4:10

Bonus track
No.	Title	Writer(s)	Producer(s)	Length
13.	"I Believe in a Thing Called Love"	Justin Hawkins; Dan Hawkins; Frankie Poullain; Ed Graham	Obika; Marcus Killian Thompson	3:33

== Charts ==
=== Weekly charts ===
Weekly chart performance for Time to Grow
Chart (2004–2005)	Peak position
Austrian Albums (Ö3 Austria)	68
French Albums (SNEP)	32
German Albums (Offizielle Top 100)	55
Irish Albums (IRMA)	38
Scottish Albums (Official Charts)	33
Swiss Albums (Schweizer Hitparade)	38
UK Albums (Official Charts)	8

=== Year-end charts ===
2004 year-end chart performance for Time to Grow
Chart (2004)	Position
UK Albums (OCC)	50

2005 year-end chart performance for Time to Grow
Chart (2005)	Position
UK Albums (OCC)	81

== Certifications ==
Certifications for Time to Grow
Region	Certification	Certified units/sales
Ireland (IRMA)	Gold	7,500^{^}
United Kingdom (BPI)	2× Platinum	600,000^{^}
^{^} Shipments figures based on certification alone.
