= Someone Should Tell You =

Single by Lemar

from the album The Truth About Love
- Released: 20 November 2006
- Recorded: 2006
- Genre: R&B; soul
- Length: 3:43
- Label: Sony Music
- Songwriter(s): Paul Barry; Steve Torch; Lemar Obika
- Producer(s): Brian Rawling; Paul Meehan

Lemar singles chronology
"It's Not That Easy" (2006)	"Someone Should Tell You" (2006)	"Tick Tock" (2007)

Alternative cover
- CD: 2 cover

"Someone Should Tell You" was the second single taken from British R&B singer Lemar's third album The Truth About Love.

Before the single's release, "Someone Should Tell You" followed the success of "It's Not That Easy" in the UK airplay charts by climbing into the top 10, peaking at #10. The single also entered the UK top 75 at #59 on downloads alone, a week before the song's physical release on 20 November 2006. "Someone Should Tell You" climbed to #21 on its release and became Lemar's second single to miss the UK top 20, joint lowest with "Don't Give It Up" which also made #21 in 2005.

A vinyl release for "Someone Should Tell You" was intended but was later cancelled.

== Track listings ==
- CD: 1
1. "Someone Should Tell You"
2. "Baby, I Love You"
- CD: 2
1. "Someone Should Tell You"
2. "Someone Should Tell You" (Kardinal Beats Remix)
3. "If There's Any Justice" (Live)
4. "All I Ever Do (My Boo)" (Live)

== Credits & Personnel ==
- Writer - Paul Barry
  Steve Torch
  Lemar Obika
- Producer - Brian Rawling
  Paul Meehan
- Mixer - Steve Fitzmaurice

== Charts ==
Chart (2006)	Peak position
European Hot 100 Singles	69
UK Singles (OCC)	21
