= Tick Tock (Lemar song) =

Single by Lemar

from the album The Truth About Love
- Released: 19 March 2007
- Recorded: 2006
- Genre: R&B; soul
- Length: 3:30
- Label: Sony Music
- Songwriters: Lemar Obika, Harold Lily, Hart Dementi, Gerard Thomas

Lemar singles chronology
"Someone Should Tell You" (2006)	"Tick Tock" (2007)	"If She Knew" (2008)

"Tick Tock" is the third single taken from British R&B singer Lemar's third studio album The Truth About Love. The single was confirmed for release by music retailer HMV UK and was released on 19 March 2007.

"Tick Tock" was Lemar's first release since "Got Me Saying Ooh" to only be released on one CD and, subsequently, became his first single to fail to make the top forty since the aforementioned "Got Me Saying Ooh", peaking at number forty-five in the UK singles chart. The single version was the Kardinal Beats remix of the song, not the original album version.

A sample of Color Me Badd's "I Wanna Sex You Up" is used in the Kardinal Beats remix.

== Track listing ==
CD

1. Tick Tock (Kardinal Beats Retro remix)
2. Tick Tock (Future Cut remix)
3. Tick Tock (Johnny Douglas remix)
4. Tick Tock (album version)

Other versions

1. Tick Tock (Staples Dance mix)

== Charts ==
Chart (2007)	Peak position
UK Singles (OCC)	45
