= Invincible (Lemar album) =

Studio album by Lemar
- Released: 8 October 2012
- Length: 38:31
- Label: Angelic Media Limited
- Producer: Steve Booker; Jamie Hartman; Lemar; Chris Shaughnessy; Mathias Wollo

Lemar chronology
The Reason (2008)	Invincible (2012)	The Letter (2015)

Singles from Invincible
- 1. "Invincible" Released: 12 August 2012

Invincible is the fifth studio album by English singer Lemar. It was released by Angelic Media Limited on 8 October 2012 in the United Kingdom and marked his first independent release following his departure from Sony. The album debuted and peaked at number 49 on the UK Albums Chart and produced the single, "Invincible".

== Background ==
Commenting on the making of the album, Lemar said in an interview with Digital Spy: "The making of this album for me has probably been the most refreshing, mainly because I wasn't trying to record an album, so to speak. I thought I'd take some time off, write some songs for a bit, go and hang in LA for a bit. The album kind of evolved, and I thought, 'You know what, these songs are good'. It's fairly musical. There's nothing really generic about this album, in that when I say generic I mean it's not typically R&B or typically soul or typically pop, it's got different elements from the three. It's quite live, it's got live sounding drums and like I said, guitars and piano. It's pop songs but the lyrics are a bit deeper. It's an album that I think in moments will make you think."

== Promotion ==
"Invincible" was released as the album's lead and only single on 12 August 2012. The song managed to peak at number 158 on the UK Singles Chart.

== Critical reception ==
Professional ratings
Review scores
Source	Rating
musicOMH	2/5 stars

Jack Dutton from musicOMH found that the album's "diversity, one cannot help but think that the album’s production sounds dated, making it sound grossly over-produced and not musically suited to Lemar's soulful tones [...] After claiming to have written over one 150 songs for this album, you wouldn’t think there would still be songs in this small collection which disappoint. Sadly, there are several [...] With the album’s overall sound not seeming to build upon his previous effort The Reason, departing from Sony may not have actually done Lemar any musical favours. You would think that with the freedom of not being on a major label he would be able to step slightly out of his comfort zone whilst also delivering a quality product."

== Chart performance ==
Invincible debuted and peaked at number 49 on the UK Albums Chart in the week of 20 October 2020, scoring first week sales of 2,749 copies. It remains Lemar's lowest-charting album to date.

== Track listing ==
Invincible track listing
No.	Title	Writer(s)	Producer(s)	Length
1.	"The First Time"	Lemar Obika	Lemar	3:54
2.	"Invincible"	Obika; Marcus Killian; Philip Hochstrate	Lemar; Killian^{[a]}; Hochstrate^{[a]}	3:14
3.	"Keep On Luvin'"	Obika	Lemar	3:34
4.	"Beautiful"	Obika	Lemar	2:46
5.	"Hurricane"	Obika	Lemar	3:30
6.	"Merry Go Round"	Obika	Lemar	4:36
7.	"Can't Let Go"	Obika	Steve Booker	3:04
8.	"Into the Night Sky" (featuring Shaughnessy)	Chris Shaughnessy	Shaughnessy; Lemar^{[a]}	2:56
9.	"The One Who Saves You"	Obika	Lemar	3:11
10.	"Very Best"	Obika; Mathias Wollo	Lemar; Wollo	3:34
11.	"Born to Love"	Obika; Jamie Hartman	Hartman	4:11

Notes

- ^{^[a]} denotes additional producer

== Charts ==
Weekly chart performance for Invincible
Chart (2012)	Peak position
UK Albums (OCC)	49

== Release history ==
Invincible release history
Region	Date	Format(s)	Label	Ref.
United Kingdom	8 October 2012	CD; digital download	Angelic Media Limited	
