= The Truth About Love (Lemar album) =

Studio album by Lemar
- Released: 11 September 2006
- Length: 43:49
- Label: RCA
- Producer: Lemar; Paul Meehan; Daniel Pierre; Brian Rawling; Fitzgerald Scott

Lemar chronology
| Time to Grow (2004) | The Truth About Love (2006) | The Reason (2008) |

Singles from The Truth About Love
- 1. "It's Not That Easy" Released: 4 September 2006; 2. "Someone Should Tell You" Released: 20 November 2006; 3. "Tick Tock" Released: 19 March 2007

The Truth About Love is the third studio album by English singer Lemar. It was released by RCA Records on 11 September 2006 and contains the singles "It's Not That Easy", "Tick Tock", and "Someone Should Tell You." The album peaked at number three on the UK Albums Chart, becoming Lemar's highest-charting album to date and his first to make the top 5. The Truth About Love was certified Gold by the British Phonographic Industry (BPI) on 15 September 2006, after only five days of it being on sale. It was later awarded Platinum on 8 December 2006.

== Critical reception ==
Professional ratings
Review scores
| Source | Rating |
|---|---|
| AllMusic | 3.5/5 stars |

AllMusic editor Sharon Mawer rated the album three and a half stars out of five and noted that The Truth About Love quickly moves "into familiar smooth soul territory, R&B from the 2000s, and up-to-date doo wop."

== Track listing ==
The Truth About Love track listing
| No. | Title | Writer(s) | Producer(s) | Length |
|---|---|---|---|---|
| 1. | "Intro" | Lemare Obika | Lemar | 0:26 |
| 2. | "Love Me Or Leave Me" | Obika; Eg White | Brian Rawling; Paul Meehan; Lemar | 3:23 |
| 3. | "It's Not That Easy" | Frederik Friis; Glenn Tharaldsen; Lars Jensen; Lorne Tennant; Martin Larsson; Sigurd Jansen | Rawling; Meehan; Lemar | 3:25 |
| 4. | "Someone Should Tell You" | Obika; Paul Barry; Steve Torch | Rawling; Meehan; Lemar | 3:44 |
| 5. | "Be Faithful" | Obika; Fitzgerald Scott; Darren Brown | Rawling; Meehan; Lemar | 3:32 |
| 6. | "Tick Tock" | Gerard Thomas; Harold Lilly; Obika; Hart Dementi | Rawling; Meehan; Lemar | 3:31 |
| 7. | "Just Can't Live Without Each Other Love" | Jamie Hartman; Hiten Bharadia; Tina Harris | Rawling; Meehan; Lemar | 4:08 |
| 8. | "Can't You See" (featuring Styles P & Mica Paris) | D. Brown; Scott; Kim Hoglund; Obika; Terry Brown | Rawling; Meehan; Lemar | 3:05 |
| 9. | "When a Heart Is Broken" | Obika; Meehan; Tim Woodcock | Rawling; Meehan; Lemar | 4:07 |
| 10. | "Caroline" | Obika; Scott | Rawling; Meehan; Lemar; Scott | 2:27 |
| 11. | "Let's Fall in Love" (Interlude) | Cole Porter | Rawling; Meehan; Lemar | 0:47 |
| 12. | "Anniversary" (featuring Joss Stone) | Daniel Pierre; Jonathan Shorten; Joscelyn Stoker; Obika | Rawling; Meehan; Lemar; Pierre | 4:09 |
| 13. | "Beauty Queen" | Obika; Fitzgerald | Rawling; Meehan; Lemar | 3:40 |
| 14. | "Your Face" | Obika; Adam Midgley; Jamie Reddington | Rawling; Meehan; Lemar | 3:25 |

iTunes edition
| No. | Title | Writer(s) | Producer(s) | Length |
|---|---|---|---|---|
| 15. | "It's Not That Easy" (live version) | Friis; Tharaldsen; Jensen; Tennant; Larsson; Jansen | Rawling; Meehan; Lemar | 2:44 |
| 16. | "Come On Over" (UK bonus track) | | | 3:21 |

== Charts ==
=== Weekly charts ===
Weekly chart performance for The Truth About Love
| Chart (2006–2007) | Peak position |
|---|---|
| Irish Albums (IRMA) | 22 |
| Scottish Albums (OCC) | 8 |
| Swiss Albums (Schweizer Hitparade) | 87 |
| UK Albums (OCC) | 3 |

=== Year-end charts ===
2006 year-end chart performance for The Truth About Love
| Chart (2004) | Position |
|---|---|
| UK Albums (OCC) | 50 |

2007 year-end chart performance for The Truth About Love
| Chart (2007) | Position |
|---|---|
| UK Albums (OCC) | 167 |

== Certifications ==
Certifications for The Truth About Love
| Region | Certification | Certified units/sales |
|---|---|---|
| United Kingdom (BPI) | Platinum | 300,000^{^} |
^{^} Shipments figures based on certification alone.
