= The Letter (Lemar album) =

Studio album by Lemar
- Released: 9 October 2015
- Length: 41:10
- Label: BMG
- Producer: Larry Klein

Lemar chronology
| Invincible (2012) | The Letter (2015) | Page In My Heart (2023) |

Singles from The Letter
- 1. "The Letter" Released: 21 August 2015; 2. "Love Turned Hate" Released: 23 October 2015; 3. "Higher Love" Released: 18 December 2015; 4. "Someday We'll Be Together" Released: 13 April 2016

The Letter is the sixth studio album by English singer Lemar. It was released by BMG on 9 October 2015, and contains the singles "The Letter" and "Love Turned Hate". The album reached number 31 on the UK Albums Chart, an improvement on his two previous albums which fell short of the Top 40.

== Critical reception ==
Professional ratings
Review scores
| Source | Rating |
|---|---|
| The Observer | 3/5 stars |

Michael Cragg from The Observer called the album "a classy, patchy soul makeover" and rated the album three stars out of five. L. Michael Gipson from SoulTracks felt that album "sees a return to the covers that made him an instant hit with fans [...] As for whether or not The Letter represents a creative peak or valley, let’s just say it represents more of the same safe choices we’ve seen from Lemar over the last nine or so years, one of more promise than fulfillment."

== Track listing ==
All tracks produced by Larry Klein.

The Letter track listing
| No. | Title | Writer(s) | Length |
|---|---|---|---|
| 1. | "Higher Love" | Bryn Christopher; Matt Prime; Tim Woodcock | 3:20 |
| 2. | "The Letter" | Wayne Carson Thompson | 3:29 |
| 3. | "Love Song" | Lesley Duncan | 4:18 |
| 4. | "Gimme Some Lovin'" | Steve Winwood; Spencer Davis; Muff Winwood | 4:08 |
| 5. | "Bring It On Home to Me" | Sam Cooke | 3:50 |
| 6. | "Love Turned Hate" | Jack McManus; Jim Irvin; Josh Wilkinson; Rebecca Ferguson | 3:13 |
| 7. | "Tainted Love" | Ed Cobb | 2:54 |
| 8. | "Love and Happiness" | Al Green; Teenie Hodges | 4:56 |
| 9. | "Crazy Love" | Van Morrison | 3:19 |
| 10. | "Someday We'll Be Together" | Johnny Bristol; Jackey Beavers; Harvey Fuqua | 4:15 |
| 11. | "Never Be Another You" | McManus; Lemar Obika | 3:38 |
| 12. | "River" (hidden track) | Joni Mitchell | 4:04 |

== Charts ==
Weekly chart performance for The Letter
| Chart (2015) | Peak position |
|---|---|
| UK Albums (Official Charts) | 31 |

== Release history ==
The Letter release history
| Region | Date | Format | Label | Ref(s) |
|---|---|---|---|---|
| United Kingdom | October 9, 2015 | Digital download; CD | BMG | |
