= Dedicated (Lemar album) =

Studio album by Lemar
- Released: 24 November 2003
- Length: 51:35
- Label: RCA
- Producers: Best Kept Secret; Fingaz; Craig Hardy; Cutfather & Joe; JD; Lemar; Nigel Lowis; Paul Meehan; Brian Rawling; Skillz; Stargate

Lemar chronology
Dedicated (2003)	Time to Grow (2004)

Singles from Dedicated
- 1. "Dance (with U)" Released: 18 August 2003; 2. "50/50 & Lullaby" Released: 17 November 2003; 3. "Another Day" Released: 23 February 2004

Dedicated is the debut album by English singer Lemar. It was released on 24 November 2003 by RCA Records. The now defunct girl group the 411 provided backing vocals for a number of tracks.

== Background ==
Sony Music signed Lemar to a five-year record deal after his success on the BBC Television programme Fame Academy in 2002. The album's first single "Dance (with U)" was written with Craig Hardy and Fitzgerald Scott who had previously worked with Keith Sweat. The second single "50/50" was recorded by the Norwegian Stargate production team. Fingaz, who has produced hits by British group Big Brovaz, also produced the song "What About Love". Lemar also recorded a version of "Let's Stay Together" by Al Green which was one of his featured songs by Fame Academy.

== Critical reception ==
Professional ratings
Review scores
Source	Rating
AllMusic	3.5/5 stars
The Guardian	3/5 stars

BBC Music critic Karen Goodchild called Dedicated "a great album that is packed full of potential hits that showcase Lemar's amazing vocal ability. That, coupled with the fact that Lemar co-wrote several of these tracks, will surely mean that he'll be around a lot longer than the other over-hyped reality TV stars." Caroline Sullivan from The Guardian found that Dedicated presented Lemar "as North London's answer to Luther Vandross: a romantic of the old school who sells a song with understated sleekness and a hint of chest fur. The contents are all Obika co-writes save for a hip-hoppety version of Al Green's "Let's Stay Together;" the mid-tempo boudoir grooves hardly do justice to the voice, but at least lay the foundations for what could be a substantial future." AllMusic rated the album three stars out of five.

== Commercial performance ==
The first single from the album, "Dance with U", reached number 2 on the UK singles chart in early 2003. Dedicated was released in late 2003 with additional singles "50/50" and "Another Day" also achieving chart success in the UK. Following the success of the album, he commenced his first headlining tour of the UK. Dedicated was certified platinum by the British Phonographic Industry (BPI) for sales in excess of 300,000 copies.

== Track listing ==
Dedicated track listing
No.	Title	Writer(s)	Producer(s)	Length
1.	"Dedicated" (Intro)	Lemar Obika	Fingaz; Lemar	1:08
2.	"Dance (With U)"	Craig Hardy; Obika; Fitzgerald Scott	Brian Rawling; Hardy	3:08
3.	"Fresh"	Abdul Bello; Obika	Skillz	3:25
4.	"50/50"	Hallgeir Rustan; Tor Erik Hermansen; Mikkel S. Eriksen; Obika	Stargate	3:24
5.	"Another Day"	Scott; Skyler Sinclair; William Whedbee	Rawling; Paul Meehan	4:02
6.	"Sweet Love"	Karl "JD" Daniel; Obika	Daniel	3:35
7.	"No Pressure"	Jas Jørgensen; Andy Love; Obika	Cutfather & Joe	3:38
8.	"Body Talk"	Darren Brown; Terry Brown; Giles Craig; Obika	Best Kept Secret	3:20
9.	"What About Love?"	Obika; Scott	Fingaz	3:39
10.	"Good Woman"	Brown; Brown; Craig; Obika	Best Kept Secret	3:47
11.	"Let's Stay Together"	Al Green; Al Jackson, Jr.; Willie Mitchell	Nigel Lowis	3:57
12.	"Hot Summer"	D. Brown; Craig; Obika; T. Brown	Best Kept Secret	3:25
13.	"Alright with Our Love"	Nigel Lowis; Obika; Scott	Rawling	4:20
14.	"Lullaby"	Ainslie Henderson; Obika	Cutfather & Joe	3:22
15.	"All I Ever Do (My Boo)"	Obika	Lemar	3:20

== Personnel ==
- Jarl Ivar Andersen – multi instruments
- Pete Beachill – trombone
- Joe Belmaati – keyboards, programming
- Dave Bishop – saxophone
- Tim Briley – assistant engineer, mixing assistant
- James Cruz – mastering
- Snake Davis – saxophone
- Joe Fields – engineer
- Fingaz – keyboards, producer
- The 411 – background vocals
- Matt Furmidge – assistant engineer
- Carrie Grant – vocal arrangement
- Simon Hale – horn arrangements, string arrangements, horn conductor, string conductor
- Michael Hansen – percussion
- Craig Hardy – producer
- Lawrence Johnson – vocals, choir arrangement
- Marc Lane – engineer
- Vanessa Letocq – production coordination
- The London Session Orchestra – strings
- Andy Love – producer
- Nigel Lowis – producer
- Paul Meehan – arranger, programming, producer
- Roy Merchant – engineer, mixing
- Mikkel SE – multi instruments
- Matz Nilsson – mixing
- Nicole Nodland – photography
- Adam Phillips – guitar
- Nick Raphael – A&R
- Brian Rawling – arranger, producer
- Fitzgerald Scott – vocal arrangement, vocal engineer, vocal producer
- Alan Simpson – guitar
- Alexis Smith – assistant engineer
- Stargate – producer
- Ren Swan – mixing
- John Themis – guitar
- Derek Watkins – trumpet
- Gavyn Wright – orchestra leader
- Jong Uk Yoon – engineer, mixing

== Charts ==
=== Weekly charts ===
Weekly chart performance for Ladies Night
Chart (2004)	Peak position
Swiss Albums (Schweizer Hitparade)	54
UK Albums (Official Charts)	16

=== Year-end charts ===
2003 year-end chart performance for Dedicated
Chart (2003)	Position
UK Albums (OCC)	59

2004 year-end chart performance for Dedicated
Chart (2004)	Position
UK Albums (OCC)	103

== Certifications ==
Certifications for Dedicated
Region	Certification	Certified units/sales
United Kingdom (BPI)	Platinum	300,000^{^}
^{^} Shipments figures based on certification alone.
