= Stop Living the Lie =

2003 single by David Sneddon

Single by David Sneddon

from the album Seven Years – Ten Weeks
- B-side: "Goodnight Girl"; "Don't Let the Sun Go Down on Me" (acoustic)
- Released: 13 January 2003
- Length: 3:57
- Label: Mercury
- Songwriter(s): David Sneddon
- Producer(s): Paul Meehan, Nigel Lowis

David Sneddon singles chronology
"Stop Living the Lie" (2003)	"Don't Let Go" (2003)

"Stop Living the Lie" is a song by Scottish singer-songwriter David Sneddon, taken from his album Seven Years – Ten Weeks. It was released through Mercury Records as his debut single on 13 January 2003. During its first week of release, it charted at number one on the UK Singles Chart and reached number five in Ireland. Sneddon performed the song on the BBC's Fame Academy show, which he went on to win in December 2002.

Both the CD and cassette editions featured the radio edit of the song, a cover of Wet Wet Wet's "Goodnight Girl", and an acoustic version of Elton John's "Don't Let the Sun Go Down on Me", a song he performed live during the Fame Academy final shows.

== Track listings ==
UK CD single

1. "Stop Living the Lie"
2. "Goodnight Girl"
3. "Don't Let the Sun Go Down on Me" (acoustic)

UK cassette single

1. "Stop Living the Lie"
2. "Don't Let the Sun Go Down on Me" (acoustic)

== Charts ==
=== Weekly charts ===
Chart (2003)	Peak position
Europe (Eurochart Hot 100)	7
Ireland (IRMA)	5
Scotland (OCC)	1
UK Singles (OCC)	1

=== Year-end charts ===
Chart (2003)	Position
Ireland (IRMA)	44
UK Singles (OCC)	18

== Certifications ==
Region	Certification	Certified units/sales
United Kingdom (BPI)	Silver	200,000^{^}
^{^} Shipments figures based on certification alone.
