= Weight of the World (Lemar song) =

Single by Lemar

from the album The Reason
- Released: 2 March 2009
- Recorded: 2008
- Genre: R&B; soul
- Length: 4:19 (Album Version); 3:33 (Radio Edit)
- Label: Epic
- Songwriter(s): Lemar Obika, Sam Watters, Jim Jonsin and Louis Biancaniello
- Producer(s): Jim Jonsin and Louis Biancaniello

Lemar singles chronology
"If She Knew" (2008)	"Weight of the World" (2009)	"The Way Love Goes" (2010)

"Weight of the World" is the second and final single taken from British R&B singer Lemar's fourth studio album, The Reason.

"Weight of the World" is co-produced by Jim Jonsin and Louis Biancaniello, while Lemar and Sam Watters co-wrote the lyrics. "Weight of the World" was released on 2 March 2009. It debuted at 108 on the UK Singles Chart. The song peaked at 31 in the UK and debuting at 10 in the R&B Chart.

== Track listings ==
CD

1. "Weight of the World"
2. "Diamonds"

== Promotion ==
Lemar performed the song on UK breakfast television show GMTV.

== Charts ==
The song debuted at #108 in the UK before rising into the top 100 the following week at #46. "Weight of the World" had a final peak at #31.

Chart (2009)	Peak position
UK Singles (OCC)	31
UK R&B Chart	10
