= If She Knew =

Single by Lemar

from the album The Reason
- Released: 10 November 2008
- Recorded: 2008
- Genre: R&B; soul
- Length: 3:33
- Label: Epic
- Songwriter(s): Lemar Obika, Claude Kelly, Tariq Belrouge
- Producer(s): Soulshock & Karlin

Lemar singles chronology
"Tick Tock" (2007)	"If She Knew" (2008)	"Weight of the World" (2009)

"If She Knew" is a song by British R&B singer Lemar, released as the first single from his fourth album, The Reason.

The song has been a further top 20 success for Lemar; it was C-listed on BBC Radio 1, entering the UK Singles Chart at #61 after just two full days of download sales, and then climbing to #14 upon the release of the physical CD. The following week the single fell to #19 but Radio 1 moved the track up to their B-list. In its fourth week, "If She Knew" dropped two places to #21.

== Reception ==
In a review from Digital Spy Alex Fletcher gave the song 3/5 and wrote, "For some reason he keeps his best vocals in the locker on 'If She Knew' and replaces his usual laid-back R&B with a futuristic pop sound that wouldn't sound out of place on a Kanye record. The results are slick and satisfactory, but this sounds more like passable album fodder than a storming comeback track."

== Track listings ==
- CD single
1. "If She Knew"
2. "Fall Over"
- Digital download
1. "If She Knew"
2. "If She Knew" (Full Phat Remix)
3. "If She Knew" (Snowflakers Remix)
4. "If She Knew" (Crazy Cousinz Remix)
5. "If She Knew" (Stonebridge Remix)

== Charts ==
=== Weekly charts ===
Chart (2008)	Peak position
UK Singles (OCC)	14

=== Year-end charts ===
Chart (2008)	Position
UK Singles (Official Charts Company)	178
