= 50/50 & Lullaby =

2003 single by Lemar

Single by Lemar

from the album Dedicated
- Released: 17 November 2003
- Length: 3:24 ("50/50"); 3:22 ("Lullaby")
- Label: Sony Music UK
- Songwriters: Lemar Obika, T. E. Hermansen, Mikkel SE, H. Rustan, M. Miller ("50/50"); Lemar Obika, Ainslie Henderson ("Lullaby")
- Producer: Stargate

Lemar singles chronology
"Dance (With U)" (2003)	"50/50 & Lullaby" (2003)	"Another Day" (2004)

Alternative cover
- CD: 2 cover

"50/50 & Lullaby" is a double A-side single from British R&B singer Lemar. It was released as the second single from his debut album, Dedicated (2003). "50/50" contains a sample of Jay-Z's "Can't Knock the Hustle" while "Lullaby" is a track that Lemar co-wrote with fellow Fame Academy contestant Ainslie Henderson. The single became Lemar's second top-five hit in the United Kingdom, peaking at number five on the UK Singles Chart in November 2003. It also reached number 49 in Ireland the same month.

== Track listings ==
CD 1

1. "50/50"
2. "Lullaby"
3. "50/50" (Blacksmith R&B rub) (featuring Jahzell)
4. "50/50" (enhanced video)

CD 2

1. "Let's Stay Together"
2. "Lullaby" (featuring Ainslie Henderson) (acoustic version)
3. "50/50" (Kings of Soul vocal mix)

12-inch vinyl

1. "50/50"
2. "50/50" (Blacksmith R&B rub) (featuring Jahzell)
3. "50/50" (Kings of Soul vocal mix)

== Charts ==
=== Weekly charts ===
Chart (2003)	Peak position
Ireland (IRMA)	49
Scotland Singles (OCC)	9
UK Singles (OCC)	5
UK Hip Hop/R&B (OCC)	1

=== Year-end charts ===
Chart (2003)	Position
UK Singles (OCC)	118
UK Urban (Music Week)	19
