= The Reason (Lemar album) =

Studio album by Lemar
- Released: 24 November 2008
- Length: 37:57
- Label: Epic
- Producers: Jim Beanz; Louis Biancaniello; Cutfather; Jay Jay; Jim Jonsin; Claude Kelly; Lemar; Daniel Lemma; Radio; Salaam Remi; Fitzgerald Scott; Soulshock & Karlin; Jack Splash; Sam Watters; Mattias Wollo

Lemar chronology
The Truth About Love (2006)	The Reason (2008)	The Hits (2010)

Singles from The Reason
- 1. "If She Knew" Released: 10 November 2008; 2. "Weight of the World" Released: 2 March 2009

The Reason is the fourth studio album by English singer Lemar. It was released by Epic Records on 24 November 2008 in the United Kingdom. His debut with the label, the album saw Lemar working with a wider range of US songwriters and producers, including Claude Kelly, Jim Beanz, Jim Jonsin, and Salaam Remi. The Reason contains the singles, "If She Knew" and "Weight of the World."

== Background ==
Speaking to the UK R&B writer Pete Lewis of Blues & Soul in November 2008, Lemar explained the thinking behind titling his fourth album The Reason: "I called the album The Reason because I wanted it to remind me of the reason why I became a musician in the first place. You know, I think the reason I became a recording artist was because the music I was listening to at the time was inspirational, exciting; it wasn't obvious [...] And that's what I wanted THIS album to be. I wanted to bring out a collection of songs that for me was inspiring, was thought-provoking, was current, and that hopefully came with an exciting, eclectic mix of styles."

== Promotion ==
=== Singles ===
"If She Knew" was released for download at midnight on 6 November 2008. From two full days of download sales, the single debuted on the UK singles chart at number 61. The following Monday two physical formats were released additionally and the song climbed to its peak of number 14. The third week it fell to number 19 and the fourth to number 21. The second single, "Weight of the World", was released on 2 March 2009. Although it was not released as a single, "Mayday" was later included on Lemar's The Hits album, released on 1 March 2010.

=== The Reason Tour 2009 ===
==== Dates ====
Date	City	Country	Venue
16 March 2009	Carlisle	England	Carlisle Sands Centre
17 March 2009	Liverpool	England	Philharmonic Hall
~~19 October 2009~~	~~Reading~~	England	~~The Hexagon~~
20 March 2009	Margate	England	Winter Gardens
21 March 2009	Bournemouth	England	Bournemouth International Centre
23 March 2009	Brentwood	England	Brentwood Leisure Centre
24 March 2009	Ipswich	England	Regent Theatre
25 March 2009	Preston	England	Preston Guildhall
27 March 2009	Birmingham	England	O_{2} Academy
28 March 2009	Brighton	England	The Brighton Centre
29 March 2009	Oxford	England	New Theatre
31 March 2009	Plymouth	England	Plymouth Pavilions
1 April 2009	Swindon	England	Oasis Leisure Centre
4 April 2009	Cardiff	Wales	Cardiff International Arena
5 April 2009	Portsmouth	England	Portsmouth Guildhall
6 April 2009	Cambridge	England	Corn Exchange
8 April 2009	Southend-on-Sea	England	Southend Cliffs Pavilion
9 April 2009	London	England	Royal Albert Hall
10 April 2009	Nottingham	England	Nottingham Royal Centre
12 April 2009	Newcastle	England	Newcastle City Hall
13 April 2009	Sheffield	England	Sheffield City Hall
14 April 2009	Harrogate	England	Harrogate International Centre
16 April 2009	Glasgow	Scotland	Clyde Auditorium
17 April 2009	Manchester	England	Manchester Apollo

Notes

- The concert in Reading was cancelled.
- Concerts after 27 March were supported by British boy band JLS.

== Critical reception ==
Professional ratings
Review scores
Source	Rating
AllMusic	3.5/5 stars
The Observer	4/5 stars
The Times	3/5 stars

95.8 Capital FM called The Reason a "consistent effort" which "leans slightly closer towards a more US-style R&B sound than on some of his previous material." Orange critic Chris Long found that "for the most part, The Reason is as solid a pop-soul album as you'll find and, while it does struggle to hit greatness, there is nothing across it that dips below decent [...] While [it] does suffer from over-polished production that lessens its emotional blows and occasionally strays toward the edge of sterility, it still manages to deliver a clutch of songs." Peter Robinson from The Observer called the album an "enjoyably addictive listen" that is at "best when [Lemar] grasps the electronic R&B coat tails of US stars like Ne-Yo and Chris Brown."

AllMusic editor Jon O'Brien noted that "it's undoubtedly a more concerted effort to halt the worrying career slide [...] But rather than panicking and overloading its ten tracks with processed beats and Hi-NRG trance riffs, The Reason wisely plays it more subtle, bridging the gap between his old-fashioned previous output and a more modern electro-focused sound [...] While [its] lack of originality still leaves Lemar searching for a full body of work that lives up to the standards of his vocal talents, its blend of old school and new school is a marked improvement on his previous vintage soulman routine." Similarly, Priya Elan from The Times wrote: "Lemar proves that he is good enough to compete with his US counterparts (Chris Brown, Ne Yo) [...] There is a problem with the faster songs – too many of them drift by and lack the hooks of the more epic numbers. But that is a minor gripe – all in all The Reason shows Lemar to be one of the best British R&B artists."

== Chart performance ==
The Reason entered the UK Albums Chart at number 41 on the week closing 30 November 2008. This marked Lemar's lowest-charting entry by then.

== Track listing ==
The Reason track listing
No.	Title	Writer(s)	Producer(s)	Length
1.	"The Reason"	Lemar Obika; Radio; Troy Johnson	Lemar; Radio	3:30
2.	"Weight of the World"	Obika; Jim Jonsin; Louis Biancaniello; Sam Watters	Jonsin; Biancaniello; Watters	4:18
3.	"Little Miss Heartbreaker"	Obika; Jim Beanz	Beanz	3:55
4.	"If She Knew"	Obika; Claude Kelly; Kenneth Karlin; Carsten Schack	Kelly; Soulshock & Karlin	4:07
5.	"Trust Me"	Obika; Salaam Remi	Remi	4:17
6.	"Over You"	Obika; Daniel Lemma; Mattias Wollo	Lemar; Wollo; Lemma; Cutfather; Jay Jay	3:46
7.	"Mayday"	Obika	Lemar	3:35
8.	"Wait Forever"	Kelly; Schack; Karlin	Kelly; Soulshock & Karlin	3:31
9.	"Not What You Say"	Obika; Fitzgerald Scott; Jack Splash	Lemar; Scott; Splash	3:16
10.	"Black Tide"	Obika; Lemma; Wollo	Lemar; Lemma; Wollo	3:36

iTunes edition bonus tracks
No.	Title	Length
11.	"Won't Walk Away"	3:42
12.	"Fall Over"	4:06
13.	"Diamonds"	3:47

== Charts ==
Weekly chart performance for The Reason
Chart (2003)	Peak position
UK Albums (Official Charts)	41
