= Time to Grow (song) =

2005 single by Lemar

Single by Lemar

from the album Time to Grow
- B-side: "Freak You Right"
- Released: 28 March 2005
- Length: 3:43 (album version); 3:25 (radio edit)
- Label: Sony Music UK
- Songwriter(s): Lemar Obika, Fitzgerald Scott
- Producer(s): Fitzgerald Scott

Lemar singles chronology
"If There's Any Justice" (2004)	"Time to Grow" (2005)	"Don't Give It Up" (2005)

Alternative cover
- CD2 cover

"Time to Grow" is the second single and title track of British R&B singer Lemar's second album, Time to Grow (2004). The single became Lemar's sixth top-10 hit in the UK, peaking at number nine on the UK Singles Chart.

== Lyrical content ==
The song lyrics refer to Lemar breaking up with a girl and him trying to get over it. He clearly is still hurting over her, but she has moved on from him. He doesn't know what to do or where to go because he still feels something for her, but she doesn't feel the same. He knows that the best thing for him to do is to move on, but he just can't do it. He misses her terribly and wishes that he could go back to when she felt something for him.

== Track listings ==
- CD: 1
1. "Time to Grow" (radio edit)
2. "Time to Grow" (5am Remix)
- CD: 2
1. "Time to Grow" (album version)
2. "Time to Grow" (Kings of Soul Remix)
3. "Time to Grow" (Kardinal Beats Remix—no rap)
4. "Freak You Right"
5. "Time to Grow" (CD-ROM video)

== Charts ==
Chart (2005–2006)	Peak position
Belgium (Ultratop 50 Wallonia)	14
France (SNEP)	10
Ireland (IRMA)	13
Scotland (OCC)	12
Switzerland (Schweizer Hitparade)	22
UK Singles (OCC)	9
UK Hip Hop/R&B (OCC)	4
