= Got Me Saying Ooh =

Single by Lemar
- Released: 1 October 2001
- Recorded: 2001
- Genre: R&B; UK garage
- Length: 3:14
- Label: BMG, E-mancipated
- Songwriter(s): Darren Curtis Brown: Terry Brown; Craig Augustus Giles; Lemar Obika

Lemar singles chronology
"Got Me Saying Ooh" (2001)	"Dance (With U)" (2003)

"Got Me Saying Ooh" is the debut single from British R&B singer Lemar. The song was his first and only single for RCA Records. The song is very different in style to Lemar's other material, as it contains a UK garage/dance oriented sound. The single was due for release on 1 October 2001 but failed to be released due to re-structuring at the label and he was subsequently dropped.

The single is not contained on any of Lemar's four studio albums or his greatest hits album, however, the BKS remix is contained on his "Don't Give It Up" CD single.

== Track listing ==
Promo CD #1

1. "Got Me Saying Ooh" (Radio Edit)
2. "Got Me Saying Ooh" (BKS Remix)
3. "Got Me Saying Ooh" (Point 4 Club Mix)
4. "Got Me Saying Ooh" (Matt Jam Lamont & DJ Face's Platic Remix)

Promo CD #2

1. "Got Me Saying Ooh" (Matt 'Jam' Lamont Edit)

Promo CD #3

1. "Got Me Saying Ooh" (Matt 'Jam' Lamont Edit)
2. "Got Me Saying Ooh" (Original Mix)
3. "Got Me Saying Ooh" (Point 4 Edit)
4. "Got Me Saying Ooh" (Ignorants Mix)
5. "Got Me Saying Ooh" (BKS Remix)
