= Another Day (Lemar song) =

2004 single by Lemar

- UK CD1 artwork

Single by Lemar

from the album Dedicated
- Released: 23 February 2004
- Length: 4:02 (radio edit)
- Label: Sony Music UK
- Songwriters: Fitzgerald Scott; William Whedbee; Skyler Synclair Keeton
- Producers: Brian Rawling; Paul Meehan

Lemar singles chronology
"50/50 & Lullaby" (2003)	"Another Day" (2004)	"If There's Any Justice" (2004)

Alternative cover
- UK CD2 artwork

"Another Day" is the third and final single released from British R&B singer Lemar's debut album, Dedicated (2003). The single became Lemar's third consecutive top-10 hit in the United Kingdom, peaking at number nine in February 2004.

== Track listings ==
CD 1

1. "Another Day" (radio edit)
2. "Another Day" (Blacksmith R&B rub)

CD 2

1. "Another Day" (album version)
2. "I Believe in a Thing Called Love" (Live on Jo Whiley)
3. "I Need a Girl"
4. "Another Day" (video)

12-inch vinyl

1. "Another Day" (Blacksmith R&B Rub 12-inch mix)
2. "Another Day" (Blacksmith club mix)
3. "Another Day" (Kings of Soul mix)

== Charts ==
=== Weekly charts ===
Chart (2004)	Peak position
Ireland (IRMA)	44
Scotland Singles (OCC)	17
UK Singles (OCC)	9
UK Hip Hop/R&B (OCC)	4

=== Year-end charts ===
Chart (2004)	Position
UK Singles (OCC)	174
