= Dance (With U) =

2003 single by Lemar

- CD1 cover

Single by Lemar

from the album Dedicated
- Released: 18 August 2003
- Length: 3:44 (album version); 3:08 (radio edit)
- Label: Sony Music UK
- Songwriters: Lemar Obika; Craig Hardy; Fitzgerald Scott
- Producers: Craig Hardy; Brian Rawling

Lemar singles chronology
"Got Me Saying Ooh" (2001)	"Dance (With U)" (2003)	"50/50" / "Lullaby" (2003)

Alternative cover
- CD2 cover

"Dance (With U)" is the second single released by British R&B singer Lemar and his first for Sony Music UK after coming third place in the BBC show Fame Academy. The single became a hit in the United Kingdom, peaking at number two on the UK Singles Chart in 2003. Elsewhere, the song reached number six in New Zealand and became a top-40 hit in Ireland, Italy, and the Netherlands.

== Track listings ==
UK CD1

1. "Dance (With U)" (radio edit) – 3:08
2. "Dance (With U)" (Blacksmith R&B rub featuring Jahzell) – 4:38
3. "Dance (With U)" (JD aka Dready remix) – 4:18
4. "Dance (With U)" (video)

UK CD2

1. "Dance (With U)" (album version) – 3:44
2. "Dance (With U)" (Full Intention vocal mix) – 6:29
3. "All I Ever Do (My Boo)" (album version) – 3:26

UK cassette single

1. "Dance (With U)" (radio edit) – 3:08
2. "All I Ever Do (My Boo)" (album version) – 3:26

Australian CD1

1. "Dance (With U)" (radio edit) – 3:08
2. "I Believe in a Thing Called Love" – 3:33
3. "Dance (With U)" (JD aka Dready remix) – 4:18
4. "Dance (With U)" (Blacksmith R&B rub) – 4:38

Australian CD2

1. "Dance (With U)" (radio edit) – 3:08
2. "Dance (With U)" (Blacksmith R&B rub featuring Jahzell) – 4:38
3. "Dance (With U)" (Kardinal Beats 'live' remix) – 4:17
4. "Dance (With U)" (JD aka Dready remix) – 4:18

== Charts ==
=== Weekly charts ===
Weekly chart performance for "Dance (With U)"
Chart (2003–2004)	Peak position
Australia (ARIA)	43
Australian Urban (ARIA)	15
Belgium (Ultratip Bubbling Under Flanders)	2
Belgium (Ultratip Bubbling Under Wallonia)	3
Europe (Eurochart Hot 100)	10
Germany (GfK)	71
Hungary (Dance Top 40)	24
Ireland (IRMA)	31
Italy (FIMI)	30
Netherlands (Dutch Top 40)	30
Netherlands (Single Top 100)	34
New Zealand (Recorded Music NZ)	6
Scottish Singles Sales (Official Charts)	4
Switzerland (Schweizer Hitparade)	89
UK Singles (Official Charts)	2
UK Hip Hop/R&B (Official Charts)	2

=== Year-end charts ===
Year-end chart performance for "Dance (With U)"
Chart (2003)	Position
UK Singles (OCC)	71

== Release history ==
Release dates and formats for "Dance (With U)"
Region	Date	Format	Label	Ref.
United Kingdom	18 August 2003	CD	Sony Music UK	
United Kingdom	25 August 2003	12-inch vinyl; cassette	Sony Music UK	
Denmark	23 February 2004	CD	Sony Music UK	
Australia	5 April 2004	CD	Epic	
