= If There's Any Justice =

2004 single by Lemar

Single by Lemar

from the album Time to Grow
- B-side: "All I Ever Do/My Boo (Part II)"
- Released: 15 November 2004
- Length: 3:49 (album version); 3:29 (radio edit)
- Label: Sony Music UK
- Songwriters: Mick Leeson; Peter Vale
- Producers: Brian Rawling; Paul Meehan

Lemar singles chronology
"Another Day" (2004)	"If There's Any Justice" (2004)	"Time to Grow" (2004)

Alternative cover
- CD: 2 cover

"If There's Any Justice" is the first single taken from British R&B singer Lemar's second album, Time to Grow (2004). Originally offered to Hear'Say, the song was rejected by the group after they decided it was "too mature" for them. It would eventually become a top-10 hit for Lemar, peaking at No. 3 on the UK Singles Chart, his fourth in a row to reach the top 10. Outside the UK, the song reached No. 1 in Hungary and entered the top 40 in France, Ireland, and New Zealand.

== Lyrical content ==
The lyrics refer to Lemar being in love with a girl who already has a man. He claims that if he had met her first, he would be her man instead. He is making it clear in the song that he feels that there is no justice in the world because of this fact.

== Track listings ==
- UK CD1
1. "If There's Any Justice" (radio edit) – 3:29
2. "If There's Any Justice" (Ron G remix featuring Cassidy) – 3:55
- UK CD2
1. "If There's Any Justice" (album version) – 3:49
2. "If There's Any Justice" (5am remix featuring Cassidy) – 3:34
3. "All I Ever Do/My Boo (Part II)" – 4:12
4. "If There's Any Justice" (video) – 3:49
- UK 12-inch vinyl

A1. "If There's Any Justice" (Kardinal Beats remix featuring Cassidy) – 3:34
A2. "If There's Any Justice" (Ron G remix featuring Cassidy) – 3:53
A3. "If There's Any Justice" (Cutfather & Joe remix featuring Cassidy) – 3:17
B1. "If There's Any Justice" (5am remix featuring Cassidy) – 3:34
B2. "If There's Any Justice" (First Man remix) – 3:30
B3. "If There's Any Justice" (a cappella) – 3:40

== Charts ==
=== Weekly charts ===
Weekly chart performance for "If There's Any Justice"
Chart (2004–2005)	Peak position
Austria (Ö3 Austria Top 40)	41
Belgium (Ultratip Bubbling Under Flanders)	11
Belgium (Ultratip Bubbling Under Wallonia)	4
CIS Airplay (TopHit)	14
Europe (Eurochart Hot 100)	11
France (SNEP)	16
Germany (GfK)	42
Hungary (Rádiós Top 40)	1
Ireland (IRMA)	19
Netherlands (Single Top 100)	99
New Zealand (Recorded Music NZ)	21
Russia Airplay (TopHit)	12
Scottish Singles Sales (Official Charts)	7
Switzerland (Schweizer Hitparade)	48
UK Singles (Official Charts)	3
UK Hip Hop/R&B (Official Charts)	2

=== Year-end charts ===
2004 year-end chart performance for "If There's Any Justice"
Chart (2004)	Position
UK Singles (OCC)	43

2005 year-end chart performance for "If There's Any Justice"
Chart (2005)	Position
CIS Airplay (TopHit)	16
Europe (Eurochart Hot 100)	89
Russia Airplay (TopHit)	12

2006 year-end chart performance for "If There's Any Justice"
Chart (2006)	Position
CIS Airplay (TopHit)	104
Russia Airplay (TopHit)	98

=== Decade-end charts ===
Decade-end chart performance for "If There's Any Justice"
Chart (2000–2009)	Position
Russia Airplay (TopHit)	68

== Certifications ==
Certifications for "If There's Any Justice"
Region	Certification	Certified units/sales
New Zealand (RMNZ)	Gold	15,000^{‡}
United Kingdom (BPI)	Silver	200,000^{^}
^{^} Shipments figures based on certification alone.

== Cover versions ==
Dutch singer Floortje Smit covered the song—retitled "Justice"—for her debut album Fearless. James Blunt performed an acoustic version of the song on BBC Radio 1's Live Lounge (part of Jo Whiley's show), later released on the compilation album Radio 1's Live Lounge. London band Birds Flying Backwards included a version on their debut album, "Lovebirds", released March 2026.
