= Don't Give It Up (Lemar song) =

2005 single by Lemar

Single by Lemar

from the album Time to Grow
- Released: 1 August 2005
- Length: 3:43 (album version); 3:12 (single version)
- Label: Sony Music UK
- Songwriters: Lemar Obika; Darren Brown; Terry Brown; Wirlie "Wy-le" Morris
- Producer: Wirlie "Wy-le" Morris

Lemar singles chronology
"Time to Grow" (2004)	"Don't Give It Up" (2005)	"It's Not That Easy" (2006)

Alternative cover
- CD: 2 cover

"Don't Give It Up" was the third and final single taken from British R&B singer Lemar's second album, Time to Grow (2004). Despite the song being remixed for single release, "Don't Give It Up" became Lemar's first song to miss the top 20 of the UK Singles Chart since the release of his debut, "Got Me Saying Ooh", in 2001. The song spent only four weeks within the UK top 75.

== Background ==
"Don't Give It Up" concerns the preservation of virginity and how young people should not give in to peer pressure regarding sexuality. The song was inspired by a woman Lemar met outside a school near Tottenham, his father's home. She had been skipping school to see her older boyfriend. Lemar and the woman spoke about their relationship and the situation regarding sexuality. He explained to her that if he truly loved and cared for her, he would wait and be patient and she should not feel the need to rush into anything that she did not want to get herself into.

== Track listings ==
- CD: 1
1. "Don't Give It Up" (radio edit)
2. "Don't Give It Up" (Cutfather & Joe Mix)
- CD: 2
1. "Don't Give It Up" (radio edit)
2. "Don't Give It Up" (Wy-le Remix)
3. "Don't Give It Up" (album version)
4. "Got Me Saying Ooh" (BKS Remix)
5. "Don't Give It Up" (CD-ROM video)
- 12-inch vinyl

A1. "Don't Give It Up" (Wy-le Remix)
A2. "Don't Give It Up" (album version)
B1. "Don't Give It Up" (Cutfather & Joe Mix)
B2. "Don't Give It Up" (Cutfather & Joe Instrumental)
B3. "Don't Give It Up" (radio edit)

== Charts ==
Chart (2005)	Peak position
Ireland (IRMA)	30
Scottish Singles Sales (Official Charts)	25
UK Singles (Official Charts)	21
UK Hip Hop/R&B (Official Charts)	9
