= David Sneddon =

Scottish singer-songwriter

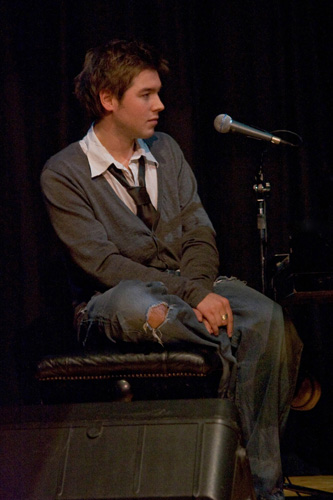
- Sneddon in 2006

Background information
- Born: David Sneddon; 15 September 1978 (age 47); Paisley, Scotland, United Kingdom
- Genres: Pop, soul
- Occupations: Singer; songwriter; musician; record producer
- Instruments: Vocals, piano, keyboards
- Years active: 2003–present
- Label: Sony/ATV Music Publishing

David Sneddon (born 15 September 1978) is a Scottish singer, songwriter, musician and music producer of contemporary pop music from Paisley, Scotland. He began his career performing on stage and television, singing lead roles in stage musicals in Glasgow. In 2002, he won the first series of BBC One music competition Fame Academy. He released his first single "Stop Living the Lie" in 2003 which was a UK number one hit single selling over 250,000 copies, making it Britain's twelfth-highest selling single of 2003. Sneddon's debut album Seven Years – Ten Weeks was released in April 2003 and reached number 5 in the UK Albums Chart. He achieved three more UK Singles Chart singles – "Don't Let Go", "Best of Order", and "Baby Get Higher". His song "Baby Get Higher" was a hit on the dance floor for Almighty Records and a chart hit for VanVelzen in 2006, and also for Emin Agalarov.

In October 2003, he moved to working primarily as a songwriter. In 2009 Sneddon signed to Sony/ATV Music Publishing as a songwriter and described his music as "melody-driven indie pop".

== Early life and career ==
David Sneddon was born and grew up in Glenburn, a suburb of Paisley, with mother Anne, father David Sr. and younger sister Pauline. He studied music at school, won several talent competitions and played lead roles in musicals both at school and at PACE Youth Theatre. When his parents bought him a piano he discovered he had a talent for writing songs and taught himself to play. Sneddon was inspired by his father's record collection of The Beatles, Frank Sinatra, Van Morrison and in particular by Elton John. "The person who has inspired me the most is Elton John," he said. "I love the Beatles, but as I was growing up, I always wanted to play the piano like him. I've never had any lessons, so he has been my only teacher." He also drew inspirations for his music from Scottish 1980s artists such as Del Amitri, Deacon Blue and Simple Minds. Sneddon enjoyed performing in musicals from a young age. At Primary school, a teacher suggested a Youth drama group called PACE and he attended PACE for twelve years from the age of eight.

After attending the University of Paisley for just six months, Sneddon dropped out to pursue a career in music. He performed in musicals and sang with bands in Scotland for several years, while he continued working on his songwriting and sending off demos. He was offered a role in a musical in London, and a part in a young boy band called Arena. He presented Inside Out, a children's show on Scottish TV.

While acting in Romeo and Juliet, he met John Kielty (Sneddon was Romeo and Kielty played Lord Capulet). After performing some acoustic nights together at the Tron Theatre in Glasgow in 2001, they decided to start a band and called themselves The Martians. The Martians busked and did shows during the Edinburgh Festival. Sneddon was performing with The Martians in 2002 when he decided to enter the BBC's first series of Fame Academy. After David won the show he brought Kielty down to London to co-write his debut album and go on tour with him. Sneddon also played in the indie-rock band The Sham with Kielty in 2004 and 2005. Since then The Martians won the Highland Quest for a new musical in 2006 – The Sundowe was produced by Cameron Mackintosh and toured the Scottish Highlands in early 2007.

== Music career ==
=== Fame Academy ===
Sneddon became known when he won the BBC's first series of a reality TV music competition called Fame Academy in December 2002. He was not selected for the first show, but was drafted in as a replacement when one contestant, Naomi Roper, withdrew from the show due to laryngitis. With his high tenor voice and easy going, personable charm, Sneddon went on to become a favourite with both the audience and his fellow contestants. He won the final of the show winning the voters attention for his memorable versions of "Don't Let the Sun Go Down on Me" by Elton John, "I Don't Want to Talk About It" by Danny Whitten, and his own composition "Stop Living the Lie" and won the public vote with 3.5m votes.

Sneddon signed a record contract with Mercury Records and was given a luxury penthouse, Audi car and more as part of his prize. He filmed his music video for his first single at Abbey Road Studios. His first single "Stop Living the Lie", was no. 1 in the UK Singles Chart for two weeks in January 2003, and in the UK Top 40 for a full nine weeks. Sneddon is the only artist from a reality TV show to have a number one hit single with his own composition. He had three other UK Singles Chart hits with his compositions – "Don't Let Go" No. 3, "Best of Order" No. 19 and "Baby Get Higher" No. 38. "Baby Get Higher" has since been a hit on the dance floor for Almighty Records and a singles chart hit for Dutch singer VanVelzen.

Sneddon was given three months to write, rehearse and record original material for his debut album. Seven Years - Ten Weeks was released in April 2003, four months after he won the show, and entered the UK Albums Chart at No. 5. The album contains all original compositions written by Sneddon, two co-writes with Scott MacAlister and four songs co-written with Martians' member Kielty. Sneddon wrote songs about his seven years after leaving university when he performed with bands, and on stage in Scotland – and about his ten weeks singing live on the BBC television series. It contains his three chart singles "Stop Living the Lie", "Don't Let Go" and "Best of Order". The album was produced by Hugh Padgham, and was recorded with Elton John's band. There was a Scottish album launch for the release on 27 April, when Sneddon performed seven gigs in ten hours all over Scotland.

After the show he toured with a band that included James Bauer-Mein. David has continued working with Mein as a songwriting and music production partnership in London since 2003.

Throughout 2003, Sneddon and his band played a university tour, the Box Live and Summer XS tours, and headlined at the 'Pop on the Rock' music festival in the Channel Islands. Highlights of the year were supporting Bryan Adams in Bristol and his musical hero, Elton John, in Hull. Sneddon also performed on TV many times, including the BBC's chart music program Top of the Pops. David was also a guest presenter on The Saturday Show (BBC TV series) and the BBC Scotland Children in Need Appeal, and he took part in Avid Merrion's comedy show 'Bo Selecta' on Channel 4. In 2003 Sneddon and the show drew negative press from the UK tabloid media such as The Sun.

By the end of 2003, Sneddon then took the step of moving from being a popstar to working as a songwriter for other singers. He signed an exclusive publishing deal as a songwriter with Universal Music Group in October 2003. Sneddon's main focus has always been his songwriting. He said "I've loved all the music side of it, it's everything I hoped it would be – the recording, the studio, writing, but the other stuff..........?"

=== Acoustic songs ===
In 2004, Sneddon was songwriting in London when he formed a rock band called The Sham with John Kielty. They played gigs in London, Scotland and the North of England and headlined at the Hogmanay Celebrations in Aberdeen. The Sham included Jay Mein (bass), Ed Carlile (drums), Si Jones (guitar), Jake Gosling (keyboards) and John Kielty (guitar).

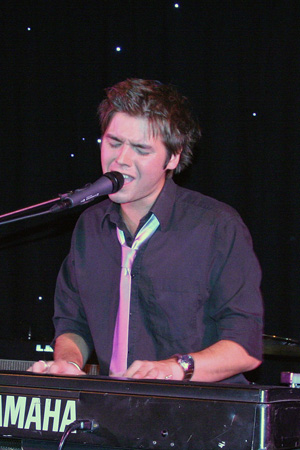
Sneddon performing in Bedford, London

In 2006, Sneddon started writing and recording for a new solo album. In July he showcased his songs in a series of acoustic gigs with Kielty on guitar in London, Essex and Scotland. In an interview for FPR Radio in October 2006, he said "It's not what people are expecting, I'm trying something a bit different. The feedback, from people who know me from the show, on the new songs has been incredible."

From July 2006 to October 2007, he performed occasional gigs mostly in London – at the Bedford, the Regal Room, The Cobden and the Troubadour venues. When Kielty moved to America in late 2006, Sneddon brought in David Mullins as his backing guitarist. He also presented a radio sports show "Keep Off the Grass" on BBC Radio Scotland in June 2007. Sneddon performed a few gigs in Scotland over this time at the Oran Mor, Dunstaffstage, the Jazz Bar and the Kilsyth festival.

Sneddon released a five-track acoustic EP, White Noise, in January 2007, his first recorded work for several years. It was recorded in 'one live acoustic take' and included the songs "White Noise", "Time", "Lady Lullaby", "One Old Soul" and "Wish You Well".

He played gigs and festivals (with Mullins) across England and Scotland in 2007. In August 2007, he performed three sold-out gigs at the Jazz Bar Edinburgh Festival to good reviews. David's songs Insomnia, Anticipation, One Old Soul and Scars proved popular with his fans.

Sneddon's 2007 EP re-entered the top of the Indiestore chart in 2008 where it has stayed into 2010. In 2008, Sneddon played several gigs in London, while he continued with his songwriting work alongside guitarist James Bauer Mein. He describes his music as 'melody driven pop'.

=== Songwriting and production ===
In October 2003, Sneddon's song "Baby Get Higher" had reached No.39 in the UK Singles Chart, and the song achieved further chart successes in November 2003 when the dance label Almighty Records produced an exclusive promo remix which was a dance hit. The label then recorded a version featuring Belle Lawrence, which was included on several dance compilation albums. In November 2006, the song was also a singles chart hit for Dutch singer VanVelzen. In 2012, the singer Emin Agalarov from Azerbaijan also released "Baby Get Higher" as his first UK single from his After The Thunder album, and the song has received BBC Radio 2 A List airplay.

In 2005, Sneddon wrote the international hit "The Message" for UK soul singer Nate James, which was released as a single in the UK, and was on James's debut album, Set The Tone. It charted in Italy and Japan in 2006. In 2009, Sneddon signed a new deal with music publisher Sony/ATV Music Publishing. Sneddon stated in the Paisley Daily Express, "This deal has been in the pipeline for a year and we wanted to wait for the right deal. I don't think there has been another reality TV winner who took a back step to this side of the industry but I like being able to get on with my work. We had to prove ourselves...and so that's why we did a lot of development work." In 2008, Sneddon focused on his songwriting career while he also performed a few occasional gigs in London over this time. He signed in 2009 with new management Three Six Zero Group, which is now part of Roc Nation and to Sony/ATV Music Publishing in July 2009 as a songwriter.

Sneddon co-wrote the song "Dominoes" for Craig David's ninth studio album, 2025's Commitment.

==== The Nexus ====
In 2003, Sneddon worked with producer and guitarist James Bauer-Mein when touring and recording his debut album. Since then, Sneddon and Mein have formed a partnership, working together in a London recording studio discovering, producing and writing with new talent in both the US and the UK. Sneddon and Mein have built up strong reputations as songwriters, having written music chart songs for other artists such as Hurts, Morten Harket of A-ha, The X Factor winner Matt Cardle, Newton Faulkner and American singer Lana Del Rey. In 2009 they decided to call themselves "The Nexus". For Cardle's debut album, Letters, Sneddon and Bauer-Mein co-wrote the songs "Letters" and "Slowly" (co-written with Cardle and Eg White). The album was released in October 2011 and charted at No. 2 on the UK Albums Chart.

In 2012, The Nexus were listed as the writers for the song "Keep the Sun Away" for Morten Harket, best known as the singer of the Norwegian synthpop/rock band A-ha, on his solo album Out of My Hands released April 2012.

It was revealed in January 2012 that Sneddon, as half of The Nexus, had co-written the song "National Anthem" for Lana Del Rey's debut album Born to Die that was released in January 2012 and peaked at No.1 in the UK Albums Chart. They also co-wrote the song "Driving in Cars With Boys" with Del Rey.

Newton Faulkner's third studio album Write It on Your Skin, which contained two Nexus songs – "Pick Up Your Broken Heart", "Soon" and "Feel" – was released in July 2012 and reached No.1 UK Albums Chart. As well as developing their own artists in 2012, Sneddon and Mein worked with Greyson Chance, Eliza Doolittle, and Dionne Bromfield. He is one of the more successful graduates from a reality TV show and has built a long career in the music business.

Sneddon's songs – Nate James ("The Message"). VanVelzen ("Baby Get Higher") Hurts ("Illuminated", "Blood, Tears & Gold, and "Silver Lining"), Matt Cardle ("Slowly", "Letters"), Lana Del Rey ("National Anthem"), Newton Faulkner ("Pick Up Your Broken Heart", "Soon", "Feel"), Charlie Brown ("Dependency"), Greyson Chance ("Sunshine City Lights"), David Archuleta ("Don't Run Away"), Shane Filan ("Everytime", "Today's Not Yesterday").

2013 Nexus Song Releases – Charlie Brown's single "Dependency" released December 2012 was produced by Mushtaq and co-written with David Sneddon (Lana Del Rey, Hurts) with a mix by the mighty Sticky. The track features street star Yungen and vocalist Ms D known for her part on Wiley's recent No.1, Heatwave. Brown's album "Dreamstate" is due for release in 2013.

American pop singer Greyson Chance's single "Sunshine and City Lights" (on his "Truth Be Told Part 1" EP), was co-written with The Nexus during a late session. American Idol runner-up finalist David Archuleta's single release "Don't Run Away" was produced by The Nexus and serviced to the AC Radio format.

In April 2013, The Nexus joined the roster of music producers and writers at 365 Artists. The Nexus have worked and released with artists such as Hurts, Lana Del Rey, Newton Faulkner, Morten Harket, Will Young, Nicole Scherzinger, Olly Murs, Pixie Lott and Kristina Train.

Shane Filan, formerly lead singer with Westlife released his first solo EP "Everything to Me" in August 2013 which included two songs co-written and produced with David Sneddon and James Bauer-Mein (The Nexus) – "Everytime" and "Today's Not Yesterday." Filan released his solo album, You and Me in November 2013, which contained the two Nexus songs and he is doing a UK tour in 2014.

== Personal life ==
Sneddon married his long-time girlfriend in May 2013 with whom he has a son and a daughter. They live in London.

== Awards ==
- Winner BBC Fame Academy: 2002
- Awards – Nordoff Robbins Award for Contribution to music: 2003
- Radio Forth (Forth One) Best Newcomer award: 2003

== Discography ==
=== Studio albums ===
List of studio albums, with selected chart positions and certifications
Title	Album details	Peak chart positions	
Title	Album details	UK	SCO
Seven Years – Ten Weeks	Released: April 2003; Labels: UMC; Formats: CD, digital download	5	1

=== Singles ===
List of singles, with selected chart positions, showing year released and album name
Title	Year	Peak chart positions	Album
Title	Year	UK	Album
"Stop Living the Lie"	2003	1	Seven Years – Ten Weeks
"Don't Let Go"	2003	3	Seven Years – Ten Weeks
"Best of Order"	2003	19	Seven Years – Ten Weeks
"Baby Get Higher"	2003	38	Non-album single
