= It's Not That Easy =

2006 single by Lemar

Single by Lemar

from the album The Truth About Love
- Released: 4 September 2006
- Recorded: 2006
- Genre: R&B; soul
- Length: 3:25
- Label: Sony Music
- Songwriter(s): DEEKAY; Lars Halvor Jensen; Martin Larsson; Ali Tennant; Fredrik Friis; Sigurd Jansen; Glenn Tharaldsen
- Producer(s): Brian Rawling; Paul Meehan

Lemar singles chronology
"Don't Give It Up" (2005)	"It's Not That Easy" (2006)	"Someone Should Tell You" (2006)

Alternative cover
- CD: 2 cover

Alternative cover
- Vinyl cover

"It's Not That Easy" is the first single taken from British R&B singer Lemar's third album The Truth About Love.

Before the single's release, "It's Not That Easy" made the top 3 of the UK radio airplay chart and the top 10 of the TV airplay chart. The week prior to the single's physical release, "It's Not That Easy" entered the top 75 at #41 on downloads alone. In its second week on the chart, once the physical CD and vinyl formats were in store, the single launched Lemar back into the top ten of the UK singles chart, after his previous single, "Don't Give It Up", peaked outside the top twenty. "It's Not That Easy" peaked at #7.

"It's not that easy" was first released in Norwegian with the title "Eventyrlandet" (Fairytale land) that Fredrik Friis composed for the child artist Eivind Løberg in the 1970s.

== Track listings ==
- CD: 1
1. "It's Not That Easy" (Album Version)
2. "Come On Over"
- CD: 2
1. "It's Not That Easy" (Album Version)
2. "It's Not That Easy" (Kardinal Beats Remix)
3. "It's Not That Easy" (5am Extended Remix)
4. "It's Not That Easy" (CD-ROM Video)
- 12" Vinyl

Side A

1. "It's Not That Easy" (Kardinal Beats Remix)
2. "It's Not That Easy" (Kardinal Beats Remix Instrumental)

Side B

1. "It's Not That Easy" (5am Extended Remix)
2. "It's Not That Easy" (Album Version)

== ^{Credits & Personnel} ==
- Writer - DEEKAY
  Lars Halvor Jensen
  Martin Larsson
  Ali Tennant
  Fredrik Friis
  Sigurd Jansen
  Glenn Tharaldsen
- Producer - Brian Rawling
  Paul Meehan
- Mixer - Steve Fitzmaurice

== Charts ==
Chart (2006)	Peak position
European Hot 100 Singles	25
Ireland (IRMA)	34
UK Singles (OCC)	7
