= Lemar =

English singer-songwriter (born 1978)

- Born: Lemar Izubundu Nnagdziem Obika; 4 April 1978 (age 48); Tottenham, North London, England
- Genres: British soul; R&B; neo soul
- Occupations: Singer; songwriter; record producer
- Instruments: Vocals; piano; guitar; keyboards
- Years active: 2001–present
- Labels: Sony BMG; Angelic Media; Absolute Label Services
- Website: lemar-online.com

Lemar Izubundu Nnagdziem Obika (born 4 April 1978), known mononymously as Lemar, is an English singer, songwriter and record producer who rose to prominence in the early 2000s following his appearance on the BBC talent competition Fame Academy. After finishing third on the programme's first series in 2002, he signed a recording contract with Sony BMG.

Lemar released his debut studio album, Dedicated, in 2003. The album produced the UK top 10 singles "Dance (With U)", "50/50" and "Another Day", and was certified double platinum by the British Phonographic Industry (BPI). His second album, Time to Grow (2004), also achieved double platinum certification and included the single "If There's Any Justice", which peaked at number three on the UK Singles Chart.

His success coincided with a wider resurgence of British contemporary soul and R&B artists during the 2000s. Over the course of his career, Lemar has released seven UK top 10 singles and ten UK top 20 singles, and has sold more than two million albums in the United Kingdom. He has won two Brit Awards and three MOBO Awards.

Later albums include The Truth About Love (2006), The Reason (2008), Invincible (2012), The Letter (2015) and Page in My Heart (2023), the latter of which was released independently through Angelic Media and Absolute Label Services.

Outside music, Lemar has appeared in television and theatre productions including Dancing on Ice, The Masked Singer, Queen Charlotte: A Bridgerton Story and the West End production of Sister Act. He has remained active as a recording and touring artist for more than two decades.

== Early life ==
Lemar Obika was born in Tottenham, North London, England, to Nigerian parents. He grew up in North London listening to R&B and soul music, and has cited artists including Michael Jackson and the Jacksons among his early musical influences.

As a teenager, Lemar performed at local music events and club nights in London. He later supported artists including American groups Destiny's Child and Total during UK club tour appearances. Before pursuing music full time, he worked on graphic and web design projects and was offered a place to study pharmacy at Cardiff University, which he declined in order to focus on a music career.

Lemar signed an early recording contract with BMG and released the single "Got Me Saying Ooh". However, the deal ended following restructuring at the label less than a year later. Following the collapse of the deal, he worked as an accounts manager for NatWest in Enfield, North London, while continuing to pursue opportunities in music.

In interviews, Lemar has spoken about the impact of his mother's death from cancer when he was in his early twenties, describing the experience as influential in shaping his songwriting and musical outlook.

== Career ==
=== 2002–2003: Fame Academy and breakthrough ===
Lemar first came to public attention in 2002 as a contestant on the first series of the BBC talent competition Fame Academy. During the programme, he performed songs including "Let's Stay Together" by Al Green and "Easy" with Lionel Richie. He finished in third place behind winner David Sneddon.

Following the series, Lemar was invited by singer Beverley Knight to perform with her at the Hammersmith Apollo. He later signed a recording contract with Sony BMG.

In 2003, Lemar released the single "Dance (With U)", which reached number two on the UK Singles Chart. His debut studio album, Dedicated, was released later that year and included the singles "50/50" and "Another Day". The album was later certified double platinum by the British Phonographic Industry (BPI).

Following the album's release, Lemar embarked on his first UK headline tour and later supported Justin Timberlake on selected UK tour dates.

=== 2004–2005: Time to Grow ===
In November 2004, Lemar released "If There's Any Justice", the lead single from his second studio album, Time to Grow. The single reached number three on the UK Singles Chart and became one of his most commercially successful releases.

Time to Grow was released later that month and peaked at number eight on the UK Albums Chart. The album was certified double platinum by the BPI. Additional singles released from the album included "Time to Grow" and "Don't Give It Up".

During this period, Lemar appeared on BBC Radio 1's Live Lounge, performing a cover of U2's "Vertigo". He also contributed to Band Aid 20's charity single "Do They Know It's Christmas?".

=== 2006–2011: The Truth About Love, The Reason and The Hits ===
Lemar released his third studio album, The Truth About Love, in September 2006. The album included guest appearances from Styles P, Mica Paris and Joss Stone, and peaked at number three on the UK Albums Chart.

The album's lead single, "It's Not That Easy", became his sixth UK top 10 single. Further singles included "Someone Should Tell You" and "Tick Tock". In 2007, Lemar featured on Sway DaSafo's single "Saturday Night Hustle" from the album The Signature LP.

His fourth studio album, The Reason, was released in 2008. The album included the singles "If She Knew" and "Weight of the World".

In 2010, Lemar released the single "The Way Love Goes", followed by his first compilation album, The Hits. The album included a re-recorded version of "What About Love" featuring JLS. Lemar and JLS later performed the song together for Sport Relief.

During this period, Lemar also toured with Mary J. Blige and later appeared as a guest performer on UK dates of Enrique Iglesias' arena tour.

=== 2012–2022: Invincible, The Letter and television appearances ===
Lemar released the single "Invincible" in 2012. The track later appeared on his fifth studio album, Invincible.

In 2015, he released the album The Letter, which included a duet with Joss Stone and a cover version of "Someday We'll Be Together".

In 2018, Lemar competed in the tenth series of Dancing on Ice, partnered with professional skater Melody Le Moal. He was eliminated during the fifth week of the competition.

=== 2023–present: Page in My Heart, broadcasting and theatre ===
On 7 February 2023, Lemar released the single "Future Love", which preceded his seventh studio album, Page in My Heart, released on 24 March 2023. A radio mix of "Dust" was later released as a single.

In 2023, Lemar appeared as Lord Smythe-Smith in episode five of the Netflix series Queen Charlotte: A Bridgerton Story.

In 2024, he competed as "Cricket" on the fifth series of The Masked Singer, finishing in third place.

Later that year, Lemar appeared in the West End revival of Sister Act, playing Curtis Jackson alongside Beverley Knight.

In 2024, Lemar also joined JLS as a guest act on selected dates of their UK summer tour.

Alongside his music career, Lemar has worked in radio broadcasting with Magic Radio and Magic Soul, presenting weekend programmes including Lemar's Soul Sunday.

In 2025, Lemar joined Craig David as the special guest on David's UK arena Commitment Tour, performing at venues including The O2 Arena in London.

Later in 2025, Lemar featured alongside Omar and the House Gospel Choir on Donae'O's single "Nights Like This".

== Filmography ==
Year	Title	Role	Notes
2023	Queen Charlotte: A Bridgerton Story	Lord Smythe-Smith	Episode 5

== Personal life ==
Lemar is married to dancer and choreographer Charmaine Powell. The couple have been together since 1999 and married in 2010. They have two children.

Lemar has spoken in interviews about the influence of family life and fatherhood on his personal life and songwriting career.

Lemar has supported a number of charitable causes and has been associated with The Prince's Trust, later renamed The King's Trust. In 2004, he attended a Prince's Trust reception hosted by the then Prince of Wales at St James's Palace recognising celebrity ambassadors and young people supported by the organisation.

He is a supporter of Tottenham Hotspur F.C., having grown up in Tottenham, North London.

His cousin Jonathan Obika is a former professional footballer who later became a first-team coach at Motherwell F.C.. Another cousin, Sam Oji, was a professional footballer who played for clubs including Birmingham City before later working in coaching and non-league football prior to his death in 2021.

== Discography ==
- Dedicated (2003)
- Time to Grow (2004)
- The Truth About Love (2006)
- The Reason (2008)
- Invincible (2012)
- The Letter (2015)
- Page in My Heart (2023)

== Awards and nominations ==
=== Brit Awards ===
Year	Nominee / work	Award	Result	Ref.
2004	Lemar	British Urban Act	Won	
2004	Lemar	British Breakthrough Act	Nominated	
2005	Lemar	British Male Solo Artist	Nominated	
2005	Lemar	British Urban Act	Nominated	
2006	Lemar	British Urban Act	Won	
2007	Lemar	British Male Solo Artist	Nominated	

=== MOBO Awards ===
Year	Nominee / work	Award	Result	Ref.
2005	Time to Grow	Best Album	Won	
2005	Lemar	UK Act of the Year	Won	
2006	Lemar	Best UK Male Act	Won	
