= Yellowface =

Theatrical makeup caricaturing Asian people

Yellowface is a form of theatrical makeup, costuming and visual technology used by white performers to represent an East Asian caricature in film, theatre, and television.

Frequently reflecting an ethnocentric perception of East Asians, yellowface has been known for relying on stereotypes of East Asians in the United States rather than realistic and authentic depictions of East Asian cultures, colors, customs, and behaviors. Unlike blackface, yellowface is considerably normalized even into the 21st century, with recent controversies including 2017's Ghost in the Shell and Aloha (2015).

== Early history ==
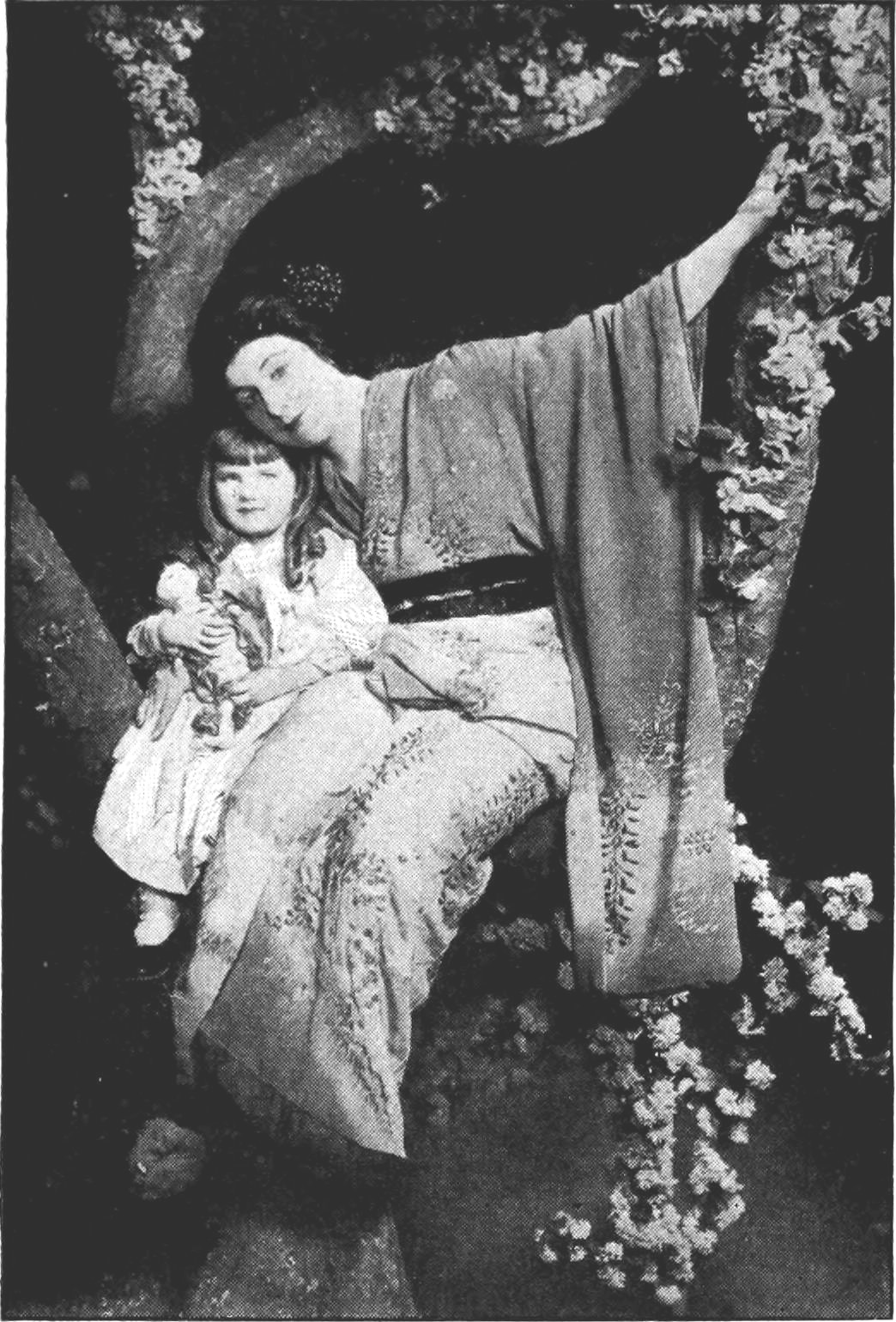
Butterfly and her son 'Trouble' (Dolore) in 1917; the latter portrayed by Ersilia Ghissoni.

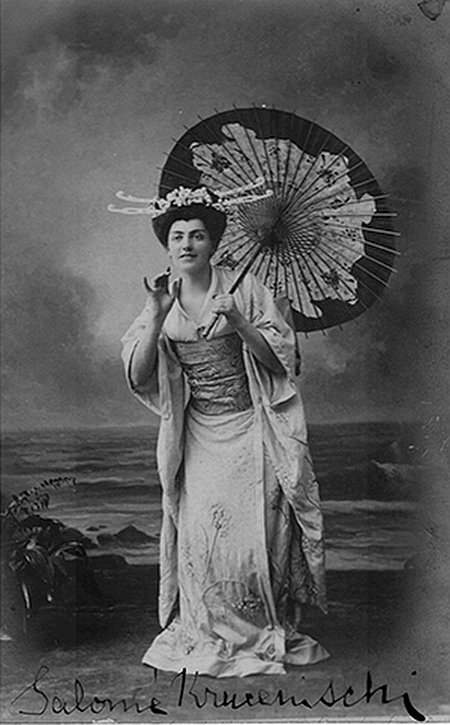
Solomiya Krushelnytska as Butterfly (c. 1904).

Various pictures of the stage adaptation of Madame Butterfly.

Yellowface as a practice began as early as the 16th century in European plays, where they would depict "Oriental" or "barbarians". The first notable theatre depiction involving yellowface was the 1898 play Madame Butterfly, where Cio-Cio-San, or Madam Butterfly was depicted by Rosina Storchio in its premiere cast and Solomiya Krushelnytska in its Breschia cast..

Yellowface makeup consisted of skin darkening, eyes altered with either shadow, tape, or prosthetics for a "slanted" look. For the 1927 adaptation of Mr. Wu, Lon Chaney used fish skin to fashion an "Oriental cast" to his eyes and grey crepe hair was used to create the Fu Manchu moustache and goatee. For prosthetics, his cheekbones and lips were built up with cotton and collodion, the ends of cigar holders were inserted into his nostrils, and the long fingernails were constructed from stripes of painted film stock. In Miss Saigon (1989), Welsh actor Jonathan Pryce wore heavy prosthetic eyelids and skin-darkening cream in playing The Engineer, a mixed-race French-Vietnamese pimp.

Costumes and setting especially played a role in bringing these depictions to life. Actors would wear costumes reminiscent of "Chinese" or "Tartar"; props such as pagodas, parasols, and fans also were used to depict the East.

== History within the United States ==
The history of Chinese Americans or the history of ethnic Chinese in the United States includes three major waves of Chinese immigration to the United States, beginning in the 19th century. Chinese immigrants in the 19th century worked in the California Gold Rush of the 1850s and the Central Pacific Railroad in the 1860s. They also worked as laborers in Western mines. They suffered racial discrimination at every level of White society. Many Americans were stirred to anger by the "Yellow Peril" rhetoric. Despite provisions for equal treatment of Chinese immigrants in the 1868 Burlingame Treaty between the U.S. and China, political and labor organizations rallied against "cheap Chinese labor".

In the U.S., Yellow Peril xenophobia was legalized with the Page Act of 1875, the Chinese Exclusion Act of 1882, and the Geary Act of 1892. The Chinese Exclusion Act replaced the Burlingame Treaty (1868), which had encouraged Chinese migration, and provided that "citizens of the United States in China, of every religious persuasion, and Chinese subjects, in the United States, shall enjoy entire liberty of conscience, and shall be exempt from all disability or persecution, on account of their religious faith or worship, in either country", withholding only the right of naturalized citizenship.

Yellowface in particular took off in the Exclusion Era, during a rise in anti-Chinese sentiment. In the United States, anti-miscegenation laws influenced the Hays Code in particular which prevented depictions of interracial relationships. This led to white actors donning themselves in yellowface in order to bypass the code. An example of this is in The Good Earth (1937), where they discarded Anna May Wong for the role of O-Lan in favor of Luise Rainer, due to Paul Muni being a white man.

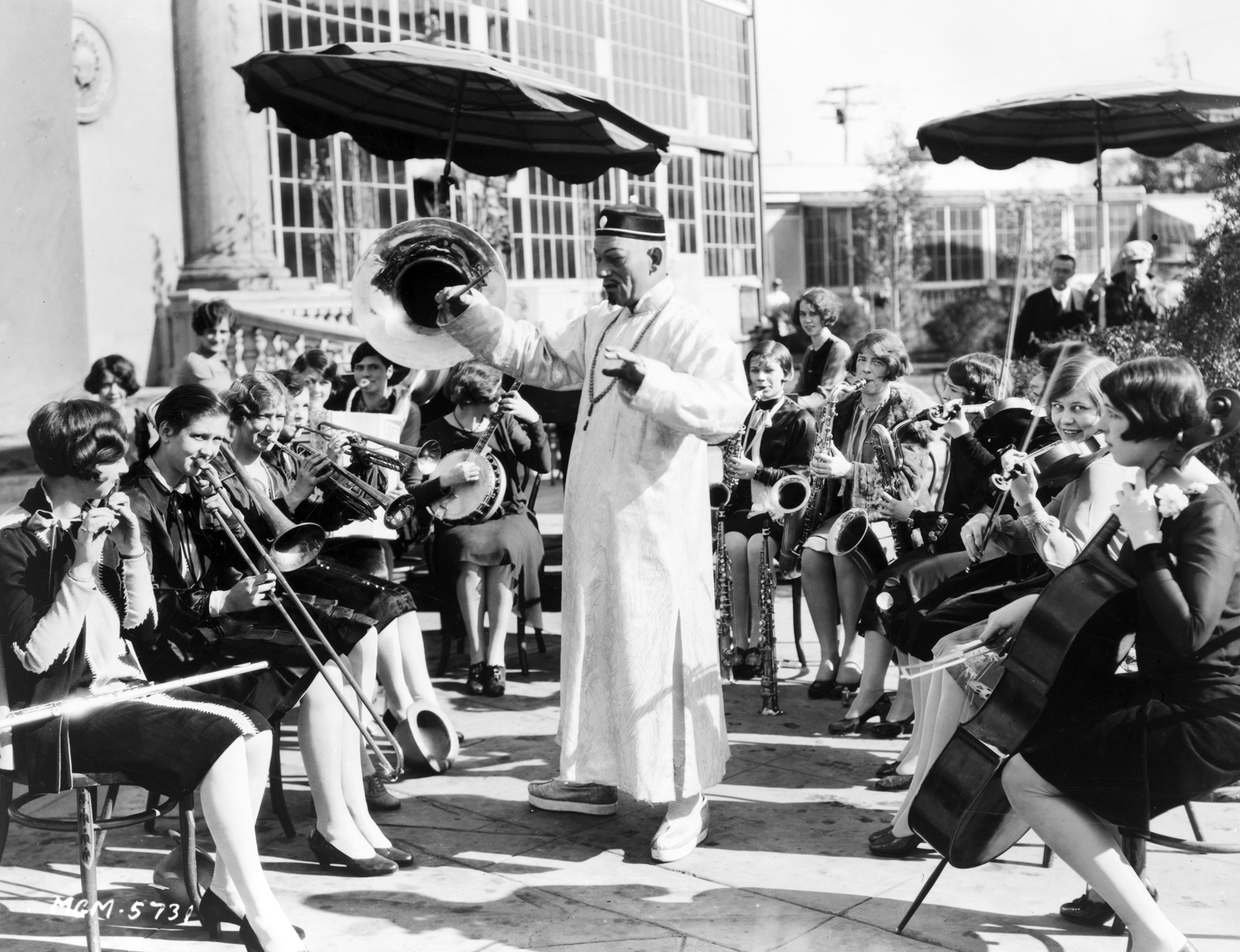
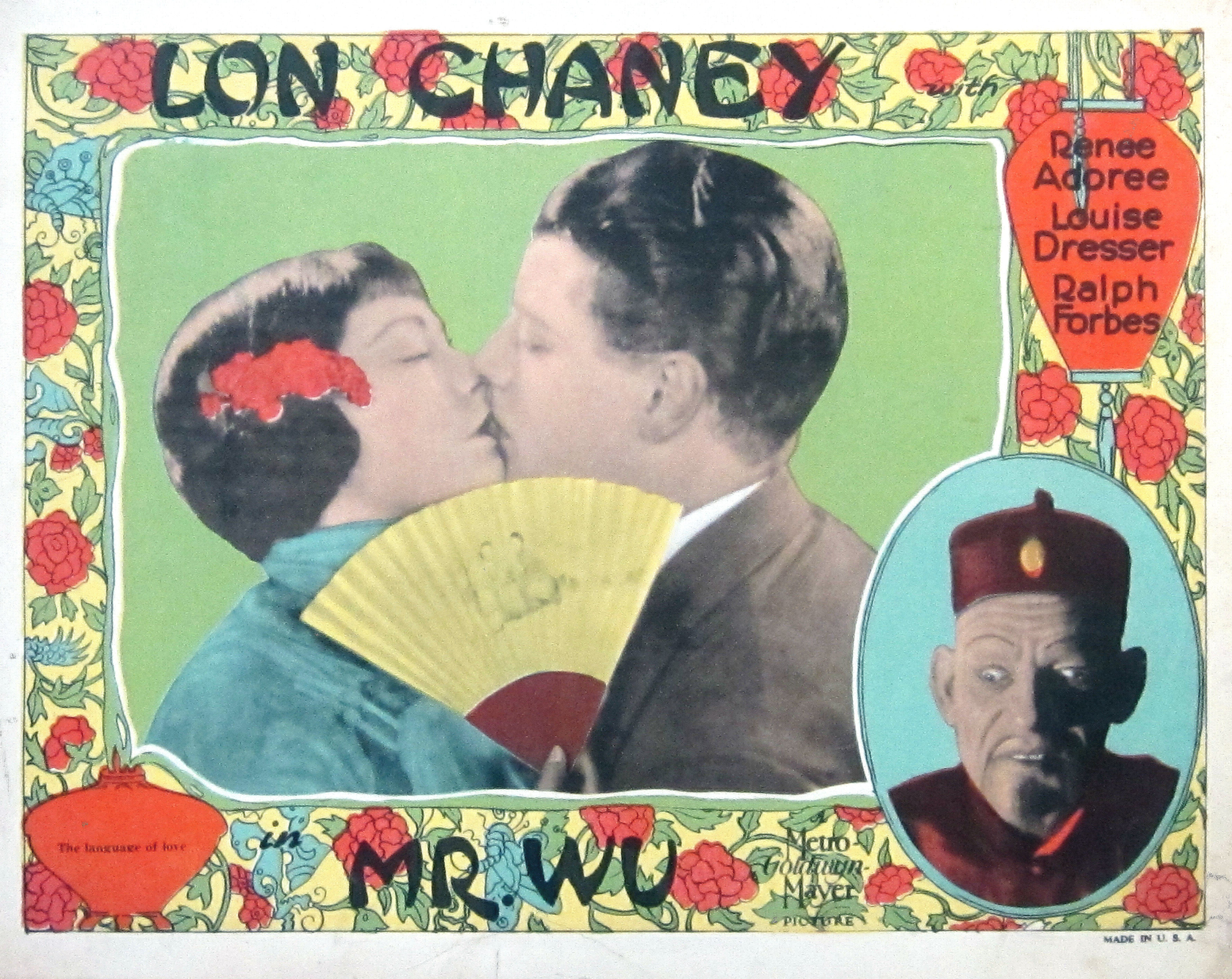
Various pictures of Lon Chaney as Mr. Wu

=== 19th century ===
The Mikado, a comic operetta with music by Arthur Sullivan and libretto by W. S. Gilbert, premiered in 1885 in London and still performed frequently in the English-speaking world and beyond. In setting the opera in a fictionalized 19th-century Japan, Gilbert used the veneer of Far Eastern exoticism to soften the impact of his pointed satire of British institutions and politics. Numerous 21st-century U.S. productions of The Mikado have been criticized for the use of yellowface in their casting: New York (2004 and 2015), Los Angeles (2007 and 2009), Boston (2007), Austin (2011), Denver (2013), and Seattle (2014) The press noted that the Seattle Gilbert & Sullivan Society cast the 10 principal roles and the chorus with white actors, with the exception of two Latino actors. In 2015, the New York Gilbert and Sullivan Players cancelled a production of The Mikado that was set to feature their repertory company of mostly White actors, due to complaints from the East Asian-American community. The company redesigned its production in collaboration with an advisory group of East Asian-American theater professionals and debuted the new concept in 2016, receiving a warm review in The New York Times. After Lamplighters Music Theatre of San Francisco planned a 2016 production, objections by the East Asian-American community prompted them to re-set the operetta in Renaissance-era Milan, replacing all references to Japan with Milan. Reviewers felt that the change resolved the issue.

Madame Butterfly (1898) was originally a short story written by Philadelphia attorney John Luther Long. It was turned into a one-act play, Madame Butterfly: A Tragedy of Japan, by David Belasco. Giacomo Puccini re-made the play into the Italian opera Madama Butterfly, set in 1904. The 1915 silent film version was directed by Sidney Olcott and starred Mary Pickford. Madame Butterfly tells the story of a young Japanese woman, Cio-Cio-San (Madama Butterfly) was portrayed by Rosina Storchio.

=== 20th century ===
==== Early 20th century ====
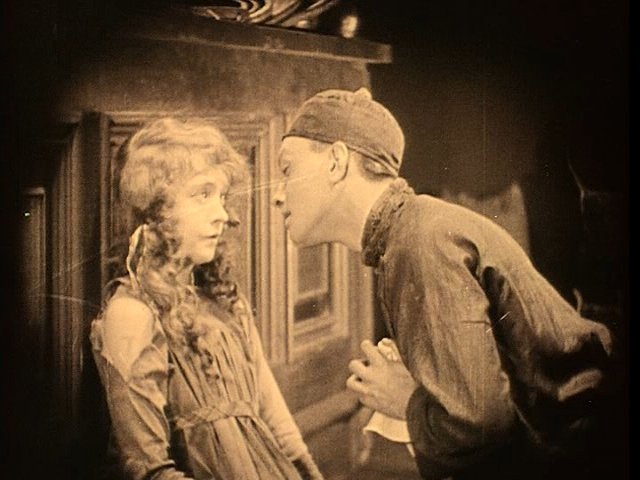
Lillian Gish and Richard Barthelmess in Broken Blossoms (1919)

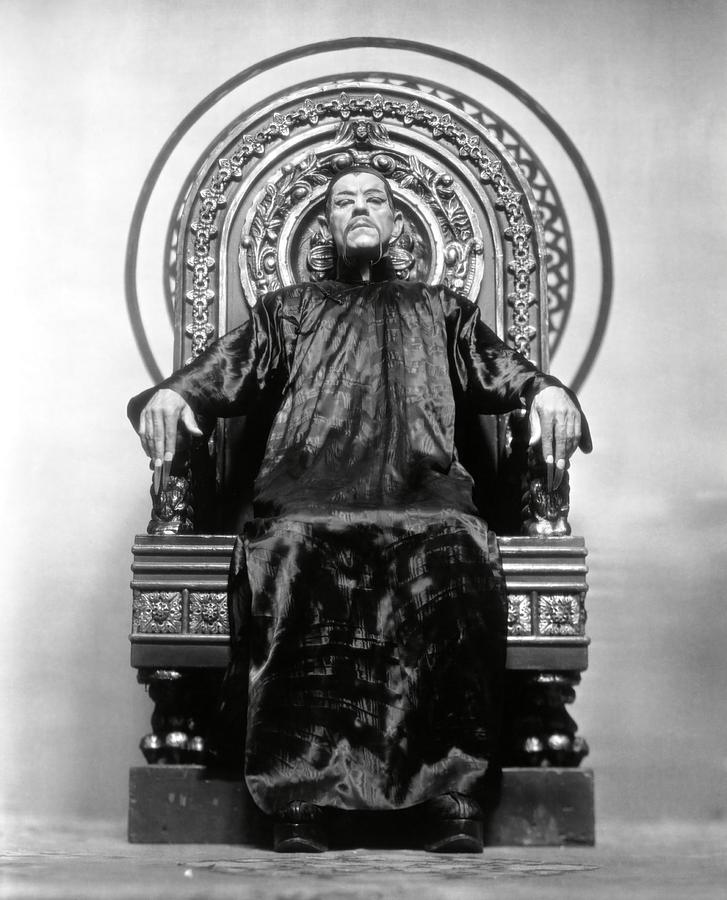
Boris Karloff in The Mask of Fu Manchu (1932)

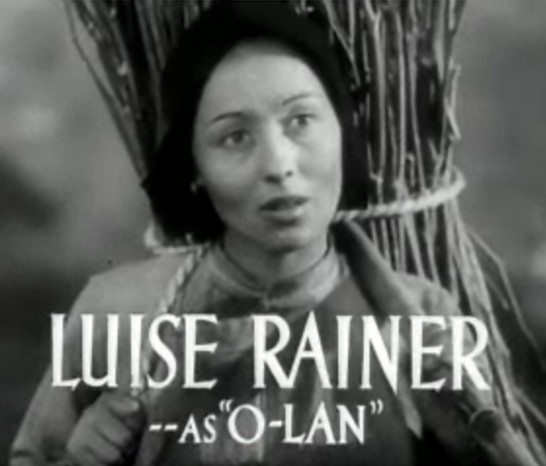
Luise Rainer as O-Lan in The Good Earth (1937)

Yellowface made its first notable appearances in theatre in the stage play Mr. Wu, written by Harold Owen and Harry M. Vernon. Mr. Wu (1913) was first staged in London in 1913, with Matheson Lang in the lead as the titular Mr. Wu. It later received a 1919 adaptation with Lang reprising his role as the lead, and a 1927 adaptation, directed by William Nigh.

The Forbidden City is a 1918 American silent drama film starring Norma Talmadge and Thomas Meighan and directed by Sidney Franklin. A copy of the film is in the Library of Congress and other film archives. The plot centers around an inter-racial romance between a Chinese princess (Talmadge) and an American.

In 1929, the character Dr. Fu Manchu made his American film debut in The Mysterious Dr. Fu Manchu played by the Swedish-American actor Warner Oland. Oland repeated the role in 1930s The Return of Dr. Fu Manchu and 1931's Daughter of the Dragon. In 1932, Boris Karloff took over the character in the film The Mask of Fu Manchu. The film's tone has long been considered racist and offensive, but that only added to its cult status alongside its humor and Grand Guignol sets and torture sequences.

In a series of films in the 1930s and 1940s, Chinese-Hawaiian-American detective Charlie Chan was played by white actors Warner Oland, Sidney Toler and Roland Winters. Swedish actor Warner Oland typecasted as Chinese, and according to his contemporaries, he did not use special makeup in the role. He also played East Asians in other films, including Shanghai Express, The Painted Veil, and Werewolf of London (decades later, Afro-European American TV actor Khigh Dhiegh, though of African and European descent, was generally cast as an East Asian because of his appearance, and he was often included on lists of East Asian actors). An updated film version of Charlie Chan was planned in the 1990s by Miramax; this new Charlie Chan was to be "hip, slim, cerebral, sexy and ... a martial-arts master", but the film did not come to fruition.

The Good Earth (1937) is a film about Chinese farmers who struggle to survive. It was adapted by Talbot Jennings, Tess Slesinger, and Claudine West from the play by Donald Davis and Owen Davis, which was itself based on the 1931 novel The Good Earth by Nobel Prize-winning author Pearl S. Buck. The film was directed by Sidney Franklin, Victor Fleming (uncredited) and Gustav Machatý (uncredited). Although Pearl Buck intended the film to be cast with all Chinese or Chinese-American actors, the studio opted to use established American stars, tapping Europeans Paul Muni and Luise Rainer for the lead roles. When questioned about his choice of the actors, producer Irving Thalberg responded by saying, "I'm in the business of creating illusions." The role of O-Lan was offered to Anna May Wong, but Wong refused to be the only Chinese-American and playing an antagonistic role, stating: "I won't play the part. If you let me play O-Lan, I'll be very glad. But you're asking me—with Chinese blood—to do the only unsympathetic role in the picture featuring an all-American cast portraying Chinese characters."

==== Mid-to-late 20th century ====
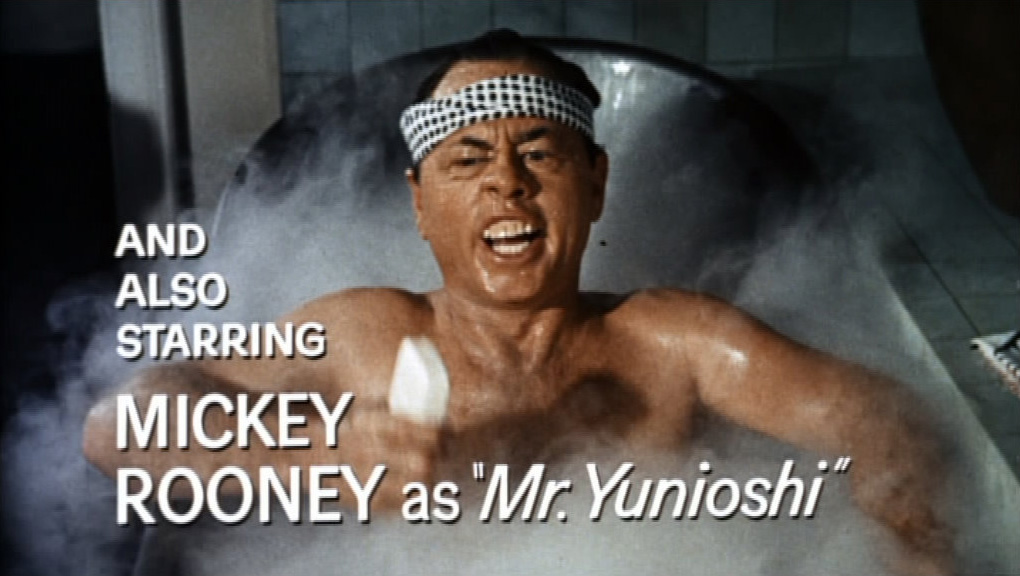
Mickey Rooney as Mr. Yunioshi in Breakfast at Tiffany's (1961)

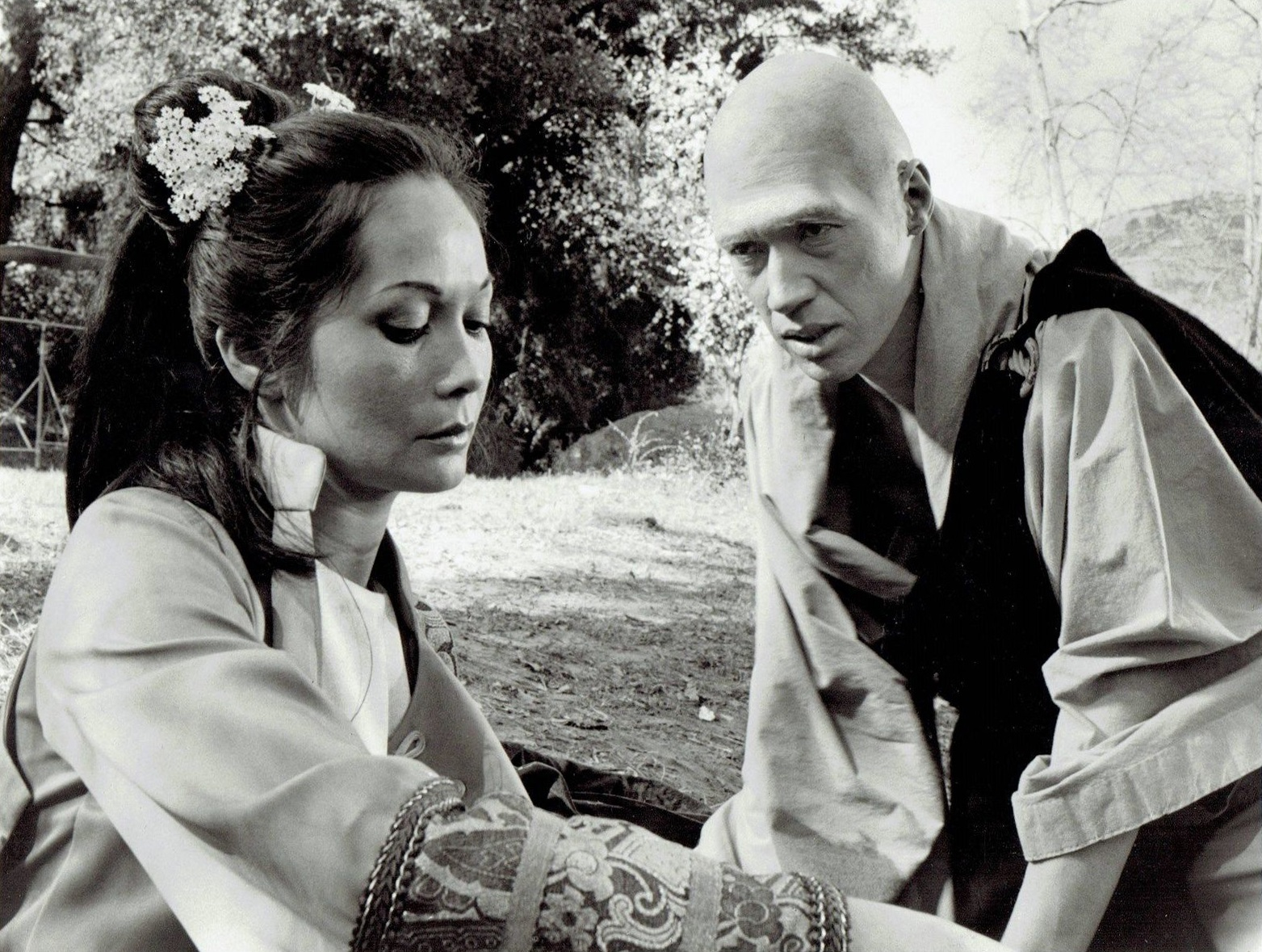
Actors Nancy Kwan and David Carradine in the 1970s TV series Kung Fu. Carradine, a white American, portrays Kwai Chang Caine, a biracial white and Chinese Shaolin priest.

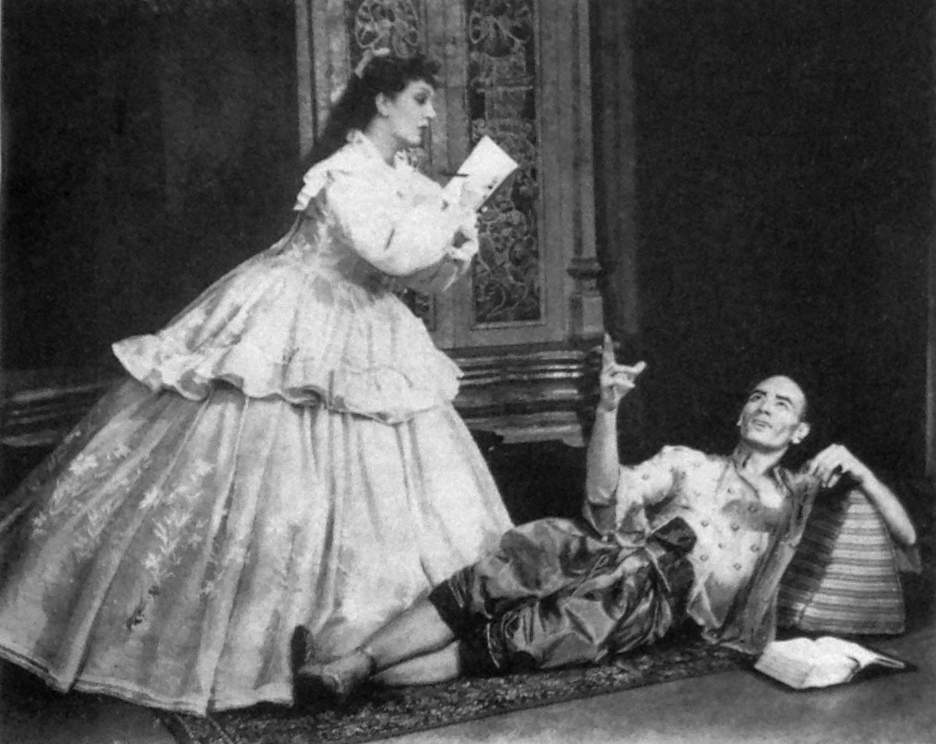
Gertrude Lawrence and Yul Brynner in the original production of The King and I. Brynner plays a fictionalized version of King Mongkut, who was the King of Thailand (formerly Siam)

Tea House of the August Moon (1956) was adapted from the 1952 Vern Sneider novel of the same name, which was written by John Patrick, who also adapted the play version. Taking place in Japan, it focuses on the United States military government trying to establish power and influence over Okinawa, during wartime. Although the cast does include Japanese actors and actresses for the roles of the Japanese characters in the film, such as Machiko Kyō, Jun Negami, Nijiko Kiyokawa, and Mitsuko Sawamura, the main character, Sakini, is played by a white American actor, Marlon Brando.

The 1961 film Breakfast at Tiffany's has been criticized for its portrayal of the character Mr. Yunioshi, Holly's bucktoothed, stereotyped Japanese neighbor. Mickey Rooney wore makeup to change his features to a caricatured approximation of a Japanese person. In the 45th-anniversary-edition DVD release, producer Richard Shepherd repeatedly apologizes, saying, "If we could just change Mickey Rooney, I'd be thrilled with the movie". Director Blake Edwards stated, "Looking back, I wish I had never done it... and I would give anything to be able to recast it, but it's there, and onward and upward". In a 2008 interview about the film, 87-year-old Rooney said he was heartbroken about the criticism and that he had never received any complaints about his portrayal of the character.

Flower Drum Song is a 1961 film adaptation of the 1958 Broadway play of the same title. This adaptation tells the story of a Chinese woman emigrating to the U.S. and her subsequent arranged marriage. This movie featured the first majority Asian cast in Hollywood cinema, setting a precedent for the following The Joy Luck Club and Crazy Rich Asians to have a majority Asian casting. It became the first major Hollywood feature film to have a majority Asian cast in a contemporary Asian-American story.

Miss Saigon (1989), a musical with music by Claude-Michel Schönberg, lyrics by Alain Boublil and Richard Maltby Jr. and book by Boublil and Schönberg, is a modern adaptation of Giacomo Puccini's opera Madama Butterfly. Miss Saigon tells the story of a doomed romance involving a Vietnamese woman and an American soldier set in the time of the Vietnam War. Once the London West End production came to Broadway in 1990, Pryce was slated to reprise his role as The Engineer, causing a major rift in American theater circles and sparking public outcry. Tony Award-winning playwright David Henry Hwang wrote a letter to the Actors' Equity Association protesting this portrayal of a Eurasian character being played by a White actor.

=== 21st century ===
In the film Cloud Atlas (2012) every major male character in the Korean story line was played by a non-Asian actor made up in yellowface makeup.

Ghost in the Shell is a 2017 American adaptation of the Japanese manga Ghost in the Shell by Masamune Shirow. It was directed by Rupert Sanders and featured Scarlett Johansson as the main character. This movie was set in the future and revolved around a story of a cyborg discovering her past. This film was controversial due to the fact that the casting featured a Caucasian with the movie being accused of racism and whitewashing in film. After the controversy erupted, it was reported that Paramount Pictures examined the possibility of using CGI to make Scarlett Johansson appear "more Asian".

The King and I is a musical by Richard Rodgers (composer) and Oscar von Hammerstein II (lyricist). Based on the 1944 novel Anna and the King of Siam by Margaret Landon, the story illustrates the clash of Eastern and Western cultures by relaying the experiences of Anna (based on Anna Leonowens), a British schoolteacher hired as part of King Mongkut of Siam's drive to modernize his country. A 2015 Dallas Summer Musicals' production of the musical caused controversy in the casting of a European-American actor as King Mongkut. In an open letter to Dallas Summer Musicals, the AAPAC criticized the choice, saying "the casting of a white King dramaturgically undermines a story about a clash between Western and Eastern cultures"; moreover, "Asian impersonation denies Asians our own subjecthood. It situates all the power within a Caucasian-centric world view."

== See also ==
- Blackface in contemporary art
- Whitewashing in film
- Racebending
- Racism in early American film
- Reel Bad Arabs
- Reel Injun
- Yellowface (novel), a fictional story about a white woman who assumes the identity of a Chinese American woman after her Chinese American rival's death.
