= Franklin Underwood =

American jazz musician

Franklin Underwood, also known as Frank Underwood during the 1960s, is an American songwriter and jazz pianist. Underwood lives in Manhattan. His show Lovely Ladies, Kind Gentlemen, a musical based on The Teahouse of the August Moon with Stan Freeman opened on Broadway in 1970. His credits include songs for Rod Warren's 1964 Chicago revue The Game Is Up, and "I Wish I'd Met You" sung by Lena Horne and Sammy Davis Jr. with music by Johnny Mandel and lyrics by Richard Rodney Bennett and Frank Underwood. Other songs include "Real Men Don't Eat Quiche".
