= The Martians (band) =

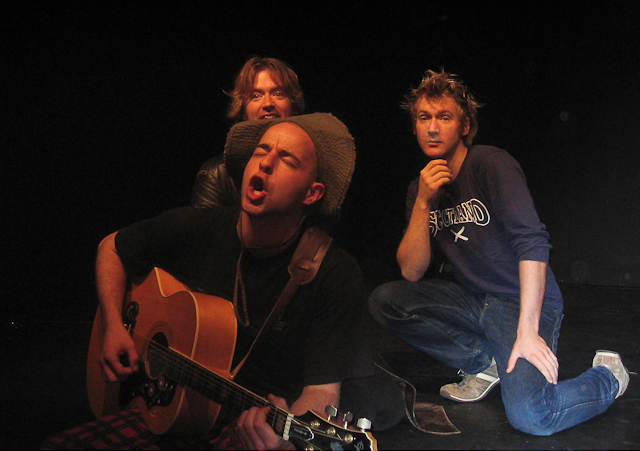
- The Martians Bedlam Edinburgh.

Background information
- Origin: Scotland
- Genres: Rock, Acoustic, Indie
- Years active: 2001–present

The Martians are an Edinburgh, Scotland based rock band, consisting of brothers John, Gerry and James Kielty. Their musical The Sundowe won the Scottish "Highland Quest For A New Musical" competition in July 2006. It was then produced by Cameron Mackintosh as a full stage musical, with the world premiere in November 2007 at the new Eden Court theatre Inverness, Scotland. Following a three-week run at Eden Court it toured the Scottish Highlands in January and February 2008.

The Sundowe is a musical set in Edinburgh about the rising dead, written by Edinburgh based writers and performers John, James and Gerry Kielty, and featuring their band, The Martians.

== Band members and origins ==
- John Henry Micheal Maximillian Kielty

Head Martian and actor, writer and musician.

John Kielty had a lead role in One Life Stand film, and performed on the stage in Edinburgh. He writes musicals and also co-wrote David Sneddon’s album Seven Years Ten Weeks. Kielty developed his love of music at St Andrews school in Clydebank near Glasgow, where he learned all his instruments guitar, drums, keyboards, and bass. He acted in Youth theatre, and after leaving school he attended Drama college. He has performed in plays, radio, film and TV work in Scotland. He made his acting debut in Iain Heggie's play A Wholly Healthy Glasgow. In 2000 John had a lead role in the critically acclaimed independent and award winning film One Life Stand, which was released on DVD in February 2006. He has acted in plays and musicals at the Lyceum theatre in Edinburgh, and additionally played the title role in The Dream Dealer (Edinburgh Fringe 2006). In 2001 he played Arthur in Merlin the Magnificent, the Prince in Cinderella, Charlie in Guys and Dolls, plus a part in the TV show Taggart.

John met David Sneddon while performing in Romeo and Juliet. He was acting Juliet's father and David was acting Romeo. After playing some acoustic gigs together at the Tron in Glasgow in 2001, they decided to start a band and called themselves The Martians.

- Gerry Kielty

John's younger brother, vocalist, performer and lyricist. Gerry frequently adopts an unusual "mouse" style singing voice. His main interest is in writing lyrics and scripts for Martian's shows.

- Houston

Banjo player, guitarist and vocalist. Generally known as "Houston". He frequently adopts a country and western style, as is well shown in "Mulch The Undead Cowboy". He co-writes much of the traditional Edinburgh Festival shows, along with the brothers Kielty.

- Harry Ward

Guitarist and vocalist. As a long-serving Martian musician Harry played himself during The Sundowe performances during the Highland Quest competition.

- Crawford Logan

A time-served actor well advanced in years compared to the rest of the band, Crawford supplies much of the voice-over work, in a style reminiscent of Richard Burton's work in Jeff Wayne's War of the Worlds and Vincent Price in Michael Jackson's "Thriller". Recent examples include "The Journalist" in The Martians own version of H.G. Wells' War of the Worlds, and as "Roothby", an old and decrepit Scottish parliament minister in "The Sundowe".

== Folklore/Marketing ==
The Martians claim to be survivors of a disastrous invasion attempt in "last years of the nineteenth Century" who have adopted the guise of a band to fit in whilst they regain their strength for a final destruction of the "Puny Humans". Their music and website contain multiple direct and backhanded references to H. G. Wells' War of the Worlds and Jeff Wayne's musical of the same name. Their website also includes a complete copy of the H. G. Wells War of the Worlds text under a Gutenberg licence.

They are keen supporters of open source software and free music, and as such have several complete songs available for free download, the only stipulation being that credits are upheld.

== Achievements ==
John Kielty and David Sneddon continued song writing, performing and working on their individual projects. In 2004 they wrote and performed with the rock band 'The Sham'. In 2006, Sneddon began writing and recording for a new solo album, and described his new album as 'acoustic indie pop'. David and John did several acoustic gigs in both London and Glasgow in 2006 which were widely acclaimed. Sneddon won a BBC UK reality television talent show with over three million votes in December 2002. He subsequently had four UK hit singles in 2003, including a No. 1, and a No. 5 album in the UK Albums Chart. Sneddon signed a publishing deal with Universal Music Group UK in October 2003. In 2009, Sneddon signed with major publisher Sony/ATV Music Publishing as a songwriter.

== The Sundowe ==
The Martians' musical The Sundowe got down to the final five stage of The Highland Quest for a new Scottish Musical competition from over 150 entrants. Written by brothers John, James and Gerry Kielty, the Sundowe is, "set in present day Edinburgh with the city in terror. People begin vanishing and vampires stalk the streets". The Quest was run in partnership with Eden Court Theatre, Inverness, The Scottish Executive and The Mackintosh Foundation, in a search to find a new musical to premiere in the Highlands of Scotland.

In July 2006, highlights from these five finalists musicals were performed in Ullapool, Scotland and the Sundowe won the competition.

The Sundowe was then one of the opening events in the newly constructed Eden Court Theatre, Inverness in November 2007, before it embarked on a Scottish tour. it toured the Scottish Highlands. Cameron Mackintosh, who produced the musicals Cats and Les Misérables, was producing.

== Greyfriars Twisted Tales ==
Produced by The Bridewell Theatre Company and City of the Dead Walking Tours, Greyfriars Twisted Tales premiered at the Edinburgh Fringe Festival in 2008. Written by The Martians and with supporting roles from Derek Elsby and Marianne Sellars, it ran through a brief history of Greyfriars Kirkyard, a graveyard in central Edinburgh. It received positive reviews from The Scotsman, OnstageScotland and Three Weeks. Following an appearance on 'Mervyn Stutter's Pick Of The Fringe' they were presented the 'Spirit Of The Fringe' award.

On 27 October 2008, Greyfriars Twisted Tales transferred to London for one performance at the Etcetera Theatre. Produced by Cassie Wadsworth and Frazer Brown in association with The Rival Theatre Company.
