= Cameron Mackintosh =

British theatre and musical producer (born 1946)

Sir Cameron Mackintosh
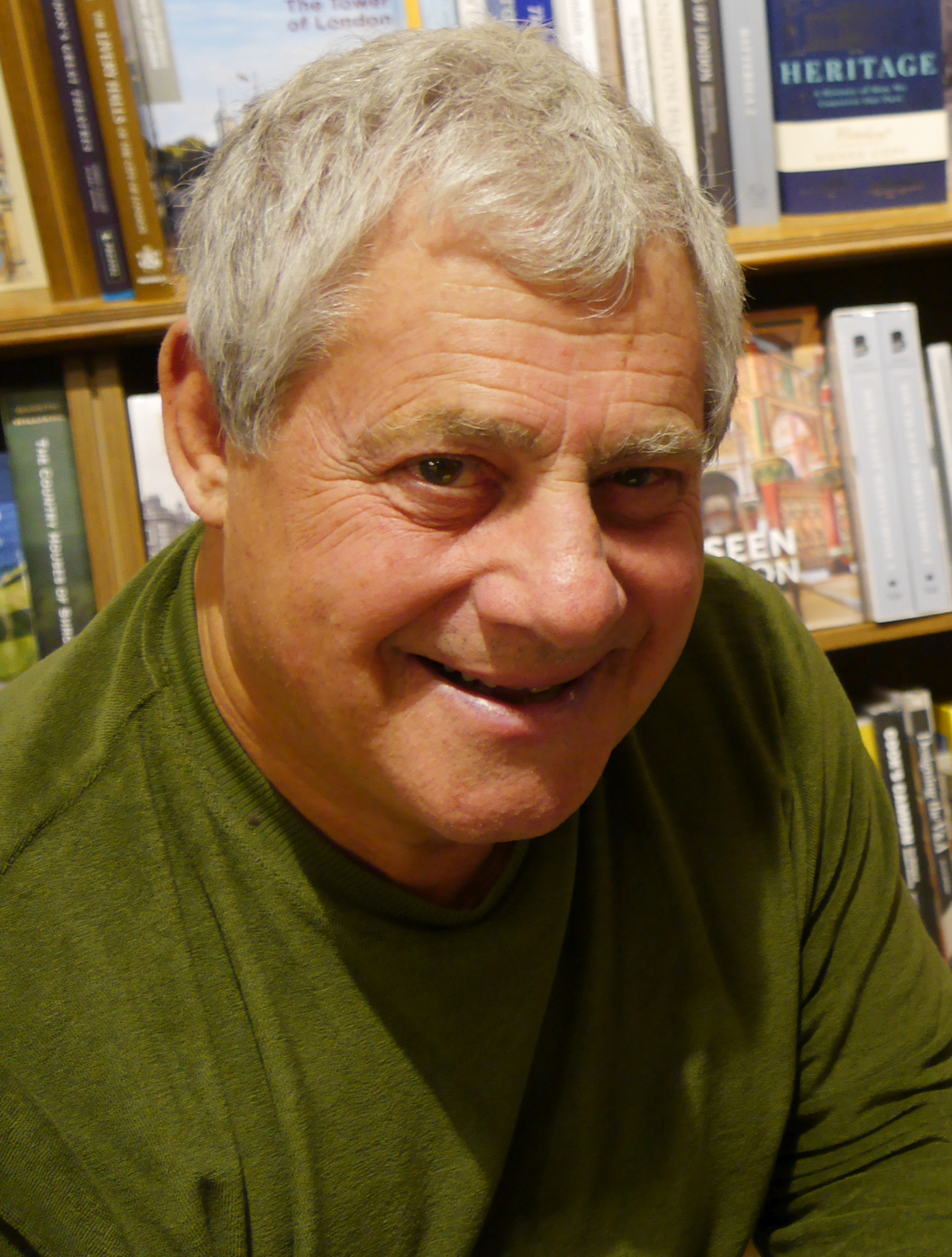
- Mackintosh at Hatchards, London, 2022
- Born: Cameron Anthony Mackintosh; 17 October 1946 (age 80); Enfield, London, England
- Occupation: Producer
- Partner: Michael Le Poer Trench

Sir Cameron Anthony Mackintosh (born 17 October 1946) is a British theatrical producer and theatre owner notable for his association with many commercially successful musicals. At the height of his success in 1990, he was described as being "the most successful, influential and powerful theatrical producer in the world" by the New York Times. He is the producer of shows including Les Misérables, The Phantom of the Opera, Cats, Miss Saigon, Mary Poppins, Oliver!, and Hamilton.

Mackintosh was knighted in 1996 for services to musical theatre. Two of his productions, Les Misérables and The Phantom of the Opera, are the two longest-running musicals in West End history. In 2008, The Daily Telegraph ranked him number 7 in their list of the "100 most powerful people in British culture". In the Sunday Times Rich List of 2021, Mackintosh was estimated to have a net worth of £1.2 billion.

== Early life ==
Mackintosh was born in Enfield, London, the son of Diana Gladys (née Tonna), a production secretary, and Ian Robert Mackintosh, a timber merchant and jazz trumpeter. His father was Scottish, and his mother who was a native of Malta, was of Maltese and French descent. Mackintosh was educated at Prior Park College in Bath.

Mackintosh first knew that he wanted to become a theatre producer after his aunt took him to a matinee of the Julian Slade musical Salad Days when he was eight years old.

== Theatrical career ==
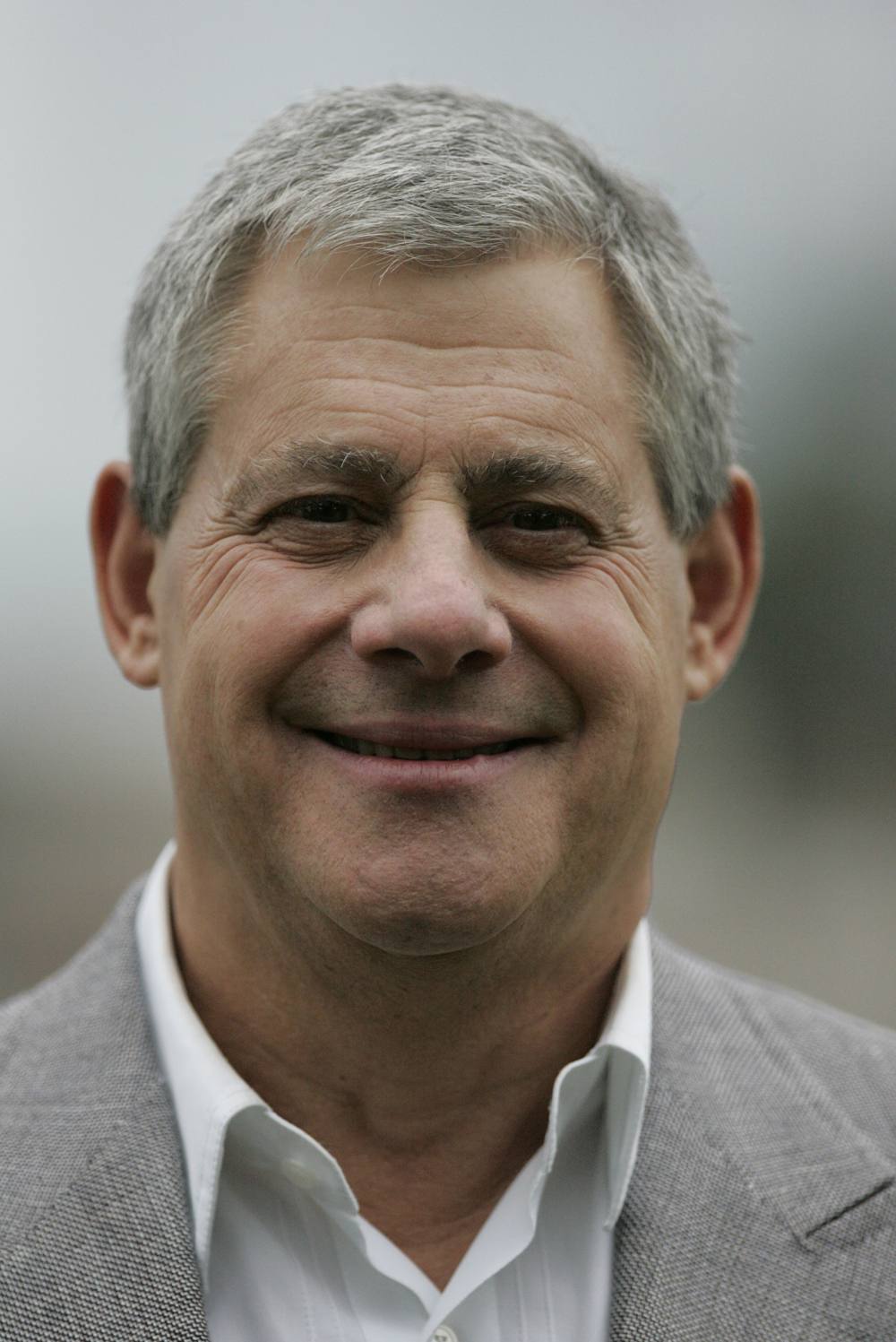
Mackintosh in 2012

Mackintosh began his theatre career in his late teens, as a stagehand at the Theatre Royal, Drury Lane, and then became an assistant stage manager on several touring productions. In 1967, working with Robin Alexander, he co-produced five plays at the Kenton Theatre, Henley. He began producing his own small tours before becoming a London-based producer in the 1970s. His early London productions included Anything Goes in 1969 (which closed after two weeks), The Card (1973), Side by Side by Sondheim (1976), My Fair Lady (1978), and Tomfoolery (1980).

In 1981, he produced Andrew Lloyd Webber's Cats, then considered an unlikely subject for a musical. It became the hit of the season, and went on to become one of the longest running musicals on both sides of the Atlantic. After the success of Cats, he approached the French writing team Claude-Michel Schönberg and Alain Boublil about bringing their musical Les Misérables (then a successful French concept album) to the London stage. The musical opened in 1985 at the Barbican before transferring to the Palace Theatre. Les Misérables had a shaky start at the box office and a lukewarm critical reception before becoming a massive hit, largely by word-of-mouth and is now the longest running musical and second longest running London production.

In 1986, Mackintosh produced Andrew Lloyd Webber's The Phantom of the Opera, which is one of the most commercially successful musicals of all time. The original London production is still running and is the 3rd longest running production in London, along with the now-closed New York production, which became, and remains, the longest-running Broadway show of all time.

He produced Claude-Michel Schönberg and Alain Boublil's next musical Miss Saigon, which opened at the Theatre Royal, Drury Lane in the West End in September 1989. It was similarly successful, and the 1991 Broadway production had what was then the largest advance ticket sales in theatre history prior to its controversy. Asian American actors protested the casting of a Caucasian actor and the use of yellowface in the role of the pimp.

Mackintosh has produced several other successful musicals, including Five Guys Named Moe (both in London in 1990 and on Broadway) and a revised London production of Stephen Sondheim's Follies in 1987. In 1995, Mackintosh produced the 10th anniversary concert of Les Misérables in London. Additionally he was responsible for presenting the West End transfers of the National Theatre revivals of Oklahoma! (1999), My Fair Lady (2001), and Carousel (1993).

Mackintosh's less successful London productions include Moby Dick (1993) and Martin Guerre (1996). He produced the stage adaptation of John Updike's The Witches of Eastwick (2000) which, despite some positive reviews and a run of more than 15 months, failed to replicate the worldwide success of his previous blockbusters.

Mackintosh became a co-owner of the theatrical licensing company Music Theatre International in 1990. He started the theatre group Delfont Mackintosh Theatres in 1991.

Disney Theatrical Productions president Thomas Schumacher met with Mackintosh in 2001 to discuss making Mary Poppins into a stage musical. Mackintosh's involvement in the development of the musical adaptation led to his producing both the 2004 West End and 2006 Broadway productions at the Prince Edward Theatre and the New Amsterdam Theatre, respectively, along with Schumacher. He co-produced the London transfer of Avenue Q, which opened in the West End at the Noël Coward Theatre on 1 June 2006.

In 1998, Mackintosh celebrated thirty years in show business with Hey, Mr. Producer!, a gala concert featuring songs from shows he had produced during his career. The concert was performed twice, on 7 and 8 June, with proceeds going to the Royal National Institute of Blind People and the Combined Theatrical Charities. Many celebrities took part, and the 8 June performance was attended by Queen Elizabeth and Prince Philip, Duke of Edinburgh.

Mackintosh produced a revival of Lionel Bart's Oliver! at the Theatre Royal Drury Lane, which ran from 2008 to 2009. The production was cast via the hit BBC television series I'd Do Anything. Jodie Prenger became the winner and was subsequently cast as Nancy in the production, with Rowan Atkinson as Fagin. The publicity and attention surrounding the production was unprecedented on the West End stage, and it was reported in January 2009 that the production was the fastest-selling show in West End history, with £15 million of pre-opening sales.

In April 2010, Mackintosh staged a West End revival of the musical Hair in London's Gielgud Theatre. This production was transferred from Broadway, where a revival production was staged in 2009.

In 2013, he worked with the Chichester Festival Theatre on a revival of Barnum, starring Christopher Fitzgerald. Due to the Theatre's refurbishment, it was performed in a giant tent 'Theatre in the Park' in July and August. In 2014, the production toured the UK and Ireland starring Brian Conley in the title role.

On 27 January 2014, Mackintosh was the first British producer to be inducted into Broadway's American Theater Hall of Fame.

On 3 May 2014, Mackintosh relaunched Miss Saigon at the Prince Edward Theatre in London, celebrating 25 years since its first launch.

In 2016, Mackintosh co-produced a new version of Half a Sixpence at Chichester Festival Theatre before transferring to the Noël Coward Theatre in the West End where it ran for 10 months.

Mackintosh produced the London transfer of Lin-Manuel Miranda's Broadway hit musical Hamilton, which premiered on 21 December 2017 at the Victoria Palace Theatre in the West End.

In 2019, Mackintosh and Disney's production of Mary Poppins returned to the Prince Edward Theatre in the West End, where it ran until January 2023.

In summer 2024, Mackintosh co-produced and revised a new production of Oliver! directed and produced by Matthew Bourne at Chichester Festival Theatre before transferring to the Gielgud Theatre in the West End in December 2024.

== Influence ==
Mackintosh is notable as a producer for his transformation of the musical into a global and highly profitable brand; he was the first theatrical producer to recognise that both touring productions and worldwide productions (often in countries where musicals were seldom seen such as the former Eastern Bloc countries in the early 90s) were potentially highly lucrative markets which could collectively, match and even surpass the revenues generated from New York and London productions.

Mackintosh has also had considerable success in bringing traditional theatre directors (such as the Royal Shakespeare Company's Trevor Nunn and Nicholas Hytner) and technicians to the world of musical theatre.

Mackintosh's Delfont Mackintosh group owns eight London theatres: the Prince Edward, the Prince of Wales, the Novello, the Sondheim, the Gielgud, Wyndham's, the Victoria Palace and the Noël Coward.

== Personal life ==
Mackintosh was knighted during the 1996 New Year Honours for services to musical theatre.

His partner is Australian-born theatre photographer Michael Le Poer Trench. They met at the opening night of a production of Oklahoma! in Adelaide, Australia in 1982. The couple live between homes in London; Stavordale Priory in Charlton Musgrove, Somerset; and the Nevis Estate, on North Morar in the West Highlands.

In 2006, Mackintosh was listed 4th on The Independent on Sunday's Pink List, a list of the most influential "out-and-proud" gay men and women. He was also listed 4th in 2005. Mackintosh also topped The Stage 100 list in 2007 for the first time since 2000. The list recognises the most influential members of the performing arts community at the end of each year.

He is a patron of The Food Chain, a London-based HIV charity.

His younger brother, Robert Mackintosh, is also a producer.

=== Laird of Nevis ===
In 1994, Mackintosh bought the Nevis Estate, on North Morar, to the east of Mallaig in the West Highlands of Scotland, covering around 14,000 acres (5,700 ha). He has since been involved in a long-running dispute with a tenant crofter, over the land use on the estate. As the laird, Mackintosh wants to use the land for building holiday homes, but the crofter says the land is needed for grazing.

== Politics ==
In 1990, Mackintosh responded to criticism of Jonathan Pryce using prosthetics and skin darkening makeup to play a Vietnamese character in Miss Saigon, saying "We passionately disapprove of stereotype casting...by choosing to discriminate against Mr. Pryce on the basis of his race, Equity has further violated the fundamental principles of federal and state human rights laws, as well as of federal labour laws."

In 1998, Mackintosh was named in a list of the biggest private financial donors to the Labour Party, a decision he later regretted, saying in 2010, "Labour really fucked it up. They were profligate at a time when we were doing well. That's why we have the problems we have now. They didn't save any money for a rainy day. It couldn't have been worse these last 12 years." In the 2015 general election, Mackintosh donated £25,000 to the successful Conservative candidate for Somerton and Frome, David Warburton.

In the 2016 European Union membership referendum, Mackintosh voted for the UK to leave the EU, stating that it was "not because I don't love Europe - I do huge amount of work in Europe and love Europeans - but there is something wrong with a system where the Fat Controller is not accountable".

== Production credits ==
- Anything Goes
- Salad Days
- The Card
- Godspell
- Side by Side by Sondheim
- Oliver!
- My Fair Lady
- Oklahoma!
- Tomfoolery
- Cats
- Little Shop of Horrors
- Song and Dance
- Blondel
- Abbacadabra
- The Boy Friend
- Les Misérables
- The Phantom of the Opera
- Follies
- Miss Saigon
- Five Guys Named Moe
- Moby Dick
- Putting It Together
- Carousel
- Martin Guerre
- The Fix
- Hey, Mr. Producer!
- Swan Lake
- The Witches of Eastwick
- Mary Poppins
- Just So
- Avenue Q
- The Sundowe
- Hair
- Betty Blue Eyes
- Barnum
- Kinky Boots
- Sweeney Todd: The Demon Barber of Fleet Street
- Half a Sixpence
- Hamilton (West End)
