= The Teahouse of the August Moon (film) =

1956 film by Daniel Mann

- Theatrical release poster
- Directed by: Daniel Mann
- Written by: John Patrick
- Based on: The Teahouse of the August Moon (1953 play) by John Patrick; The Teahouse of the August Moon (1951 novel) by Vern J. Sneider
- Produced by: Jack Cummings
- Starring: Marlon Brando; Glenn Ford; Machiko Kyō; Eddie Albert
- Cinematography: John Alton; Russell Harlan
- Edited by: Harold F. Kress
- Music by: Saul Chaplin
- Production company: Metro-Goldwyn-Mayer
- Distributed by: Loew's Inc.
- Release dates: November 20, 1956 (Los Angeles premiere); November 29, 1956 (US)
- Running time: 123 minutes
- Country: United States
- Languages: English; Japanese
- Budget: $3,926,000
- Box office: $8,925,000

The Teahouse of the August Moon is a 1956 American comedy film in CinemaScope, directed by Daniel Mann, and starring Marlon Brando, Glenn Ford, Machiko Kyō, Eddie Albert, and Paul Ford. It is adapted by John Patrick from his 1953 play, in turn based on the 1951 novel by Vern J. Sneider. The film satirizes the U.S. occupation and Americanization of the island of Okinawa following the end of World War II in 1945.

The film premiered in Los Angeles on November 20, 1956. It was nominated for six Golden Globe Awards, including Best Motion Picture – Musical or Comedy, Best Actor in a Motion Picture – Musical or Comedy for both Brando and Ford, and Best Actress in a Motion Picture – Musical or Comedy for Kyō (her only non-Japanese film role). It was also nominated for the Golden Bear at the 7th Berlin International Film Festival.

== Plot ==
Misfit Captain Fisby is sent to Americanize the village of Tobiki on Okinawa, the largest of the Ryukyu Islands. His commanding officer, Colonel Wainwright Purdy III, assigns him a wily local, Sakini, as interpreter.

Fisby tries to implement the military's plans by encouraging the villagers to build a school in the shape of a pentagon, but they want to build a teahouse instead. Fisby gradually becomes assimilated to the local customs and mores with the help of Sakini and Lotus Blossom, a young geisha.

To revive the economy, he has the Okinawans manufacture small items to sell as souvenirs, but nobody wants to buy them. These include cricket cages and wooden Japanese footwear called geta. Then Fisby makes a happy discovery. The villagers distill a potent sweet potato brandy in a matter of days which finds a ready market in the American army. With the influx of money, the teahouse is built in next to no time.

When Purdy sends psychiatrist Captain McLean to check up on Fisby, the newcomer is quickly won over. This, even after Fisby greets McLean wearing geta, an army bathrobe (which Fisby claims is his kimono) and what Fisby terms an "air-conditioned" straw hat (the latter being headwear worn by Okinawan farmers). McLean later proves to be enthusiastic about organic farming.

When Purdy doesn't hear from either officer, he shows up in person and surprises Fisby and McLean, the latter wearing a yukata (summer-weight kimono). They are leading a rowdy song at a party in full swing in the teahouse. Purdy orders the building and distillery destroyed. In a burst of foresight, the villagers break up old water urns rather than the brandy storage and only dismantle the teahouse, hiding the sections.

The village is chosen by the Supreme Commander of the Allied Powers (SCAP) as an example of successful American-led democratization. This leads to Colonel Purdy's regretting his actions and to reassembling the teahouse.

== Cast ==
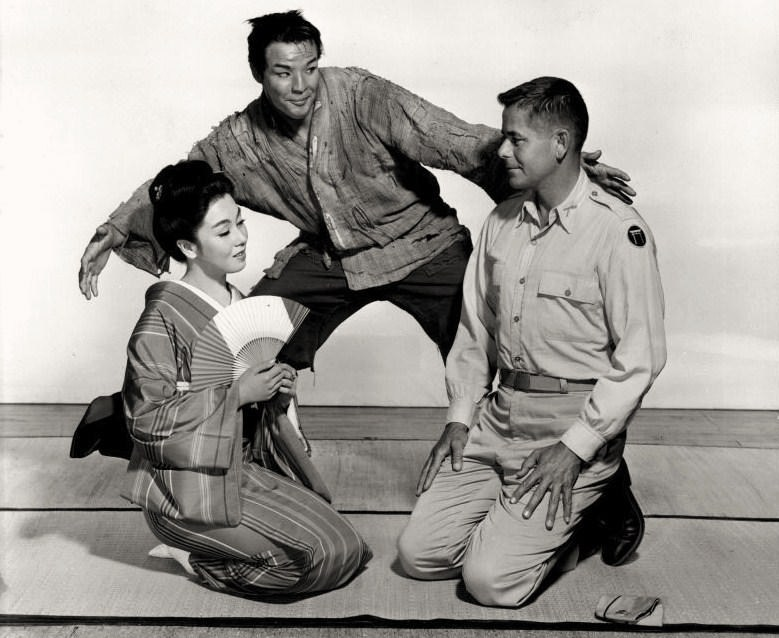
From left-to-right: Machiko Kyō, Marlon Brando, and Glenn Ford, in a promotional still.

- Marlon Brando as Sakini
- Glenn Ford as Captain Fisby
- Machiko Kyō as Lotus Blossom
- Eddie Albert as Captain McLean
- Paul Ford as Colonel Wainwright Purdy III
- Jun Negami as Mr. Seiko
- Nijiko Kiyokawa as Miss Higa Jiga
- Mitsuko Sawamura as Little Girl
- Harry Morgan as Sergeant Gregovich
- Minoru Nishida as Sumata
- Kichizaemon Sarumaru as Hokaida
- Frank Tokunaga as Omura
- Raynum K. Tsukamoto as Oshiro
- Shichizo Takeda as Ancient Man

== Production ==
=== Casting ===
Portraying an Okinawan villager was to prove an interesting challenge for Marlon Brando's method acting techniques. He spent two months studying local culture, speech, and gestures and, for the actual shooting, spent two hours daily having make-up applied to make him appear Japanese.

Louis Calhern was originally cast in the role of Colonel Wainwright Purdy III but he died unexpectedly of a heart attack soon after arriving in Nara. He was replaced by Paul Ford,an original member of the Broadway cast and had played the part more than a thousand times on stage. He would later play a similarly bumbling, harassed colonel in Phil Silvers' TV series Bilko.

Ford was not the only actor who went on to be cast in a television series role very similar to his Teahouse character. Like the psychiatrist Captain McLean, Eddie Albert's Oliver Wendell Douglas on Green Acres (1965–71) was a licensed professional with an advanced degree, who obsessed about the glory of farming and yearned to give up his practice in favor of tending the soil.

Machiko Kyō (Lotus Blossom) had won acclaim for her dramatic performances in Rashomon and Gate of Hell, so this lightly comedic part was a departure for her. This was Kyō only non-Japanese film role, and indeed her only English-language film. Filipino film actress Tita Duran initially auditioned for the role in mid-1954, with Duran and her husband, actor Pancho Magalona, visiting New York City to view the theatrical play.

=== Filming ===
Shooting took place at the MGM studios in Hollywood, and on-location in Nara and Kyoto in Japan. Due to stormy weather, the production had to prematurely return to the United States to complete exterior filming in Los Angeles, including at Yamashiro Historic District.

=== Music ===
The film made use of traditional Japanese music recorded in Kyoto and sung and danced by Japanese artists.

== Release ==
=== Home media ===
On November 7, 2006, was released in DVD by Warner Bros. Home Entertainment as part of The Marlon Brando Collection along with Julius Caesar, Mutiny on the Bounty and Reflections in a Golden Eye. On November 20, 2018, was released in DVD, under the label Warner Archive Collection.

== Reception ==
The picture was well received, both at the box-office and critically. The film was MGM's biggest hit of the year, earning $5,550,000 in the US and Canada, and an additional $3,375,000 from a worldwide audience. The film made a profit of $1,507,000. It was nominated for a Golden Globe Award for Motion Picture Promoting International Understanding.

== Legacy ==
Alongside Japanese War Bride (1952) and another Brando film, Sayonara (1957), The Teahouse of the August Moon was argued by some scholars to have increased interracial tolerance in the United States by openly discussing interracial marriages. Other scholars have argued that the movie is one in a long list stereotyping Asian American women as "lotus blossom, geisha girl, china doll, or Suzie Wong" by presenting Asian women as "passive, sexually compliant and easy to seduce" or as downright promiscuous. The film has been criticized by critical theorists and Brando's performance branded as an example of yellowface casting.

In 1980, Michael Medved awarded Marlon Brando's performance a Golden Turkey Award for "Most Ludicrous Racial Impersonation".

== See also ==
- The Teahouse of the August Moon (novel)
- Lovely Ladies, Kind Gentlemen - a 1971 musical version of the play
- List of American films of 1956
