= A Pail of Oysters =

1953 novel by Vern Sneider

- Cover of the first edition
- Author: Vern Sneider
- Subject: The White Terror
- Set in: Taiwan
- Publisher: Putnam, Camphor Press
- Publication date: 1953 (2016)

A Pail of Oysters is a novel by Vern Sneider published in 1953. Set during Taiwan's White Terror era, the book "tells the tragic story of three young Taiwanese people who become involved with an American journalist". Sympathetic to the Taiwanese people and deeply critical of Kuomintang rule, A Pail of Oysters was suppressed in the 1950s before gaining new life after the end of martial law in Taiwan.

== Aim of the novel ==
Sneider hoped that the book would reduce the suffering of Taiwanese people under the Kuomintang. He wrote to George H. Kerr, later author of Formosa Betrayed, saying the viewpoint in the novel "will be strictly that of the Formosan people, trying to exist under that government. And ... maybe, in my small way, I can do something for the people of Formosa." Jonathan Benda, in his introduction to the 2016 edition of the book, argues that Sneider's novel intended "to make Americans think in particular about the regime they supported in Taiwan, but more generally about what the U.S. role in Asia should be".

== Reception ==
On release the book received positive critical reviews, but was banned in Taiwan and was attacked by the China Lobby in the United States. One academic familiar with the impact of the book commented in 2003 that "copies of A Pail of Oysters have disappeared from most libraries, probably on instructions issued to the student spies paid by the KMT to monitor Taiwanese on US college campuses".

== Reemergence in the 2000s ==
After the end of martial law in Taiwan the book was published in translated editions in both Mandarin Chinese (in 2002) and Taiwanese Hokkien (2003). A new English edition appeared in 2016, with an introduction by Jonathan Benda of Northeastern University.
