= Lovely Ladies, Kind Gentlemen =

- Music: Stan Freeman; Franklin Underwood
- Lyrics: Stan Freeman; Franklin Underwood
- Book: John Patrick
- Basis: The Teahouse of the August Moon (novel) – Vern J. Sneider; The Teahouse of the August Moon (play) – John Patrick
- Productions: 1970 Broadway

Lovely Ladies, Kind Gentlemen is a musical with a book by John Patrick and music and lyrics by Stan Freeman and Franklin Underwood.

== Overview ==
The musical is based on Patrick's 1953 play and screenplay The Teahouse of the August Moon. It focuses on Capt. Fisby who, assigned to Americanize the village of Tobiki on Okinawa following World War II, encourages the residents to build a school. They would prefer a traditional teahouse instead, and when Fisby discovers the potent alcoholic beverage they brew is popular with the American GIs and a big money-maker, he falls in with their plans. Helping him become assimilated to the local mores are local interpreter Sakini and geisha Lotus Blossom.

== Production ==
The musical opened in Philadelphia, Pennsylvania at the Shubert Theatre on August 19, 1970 in its out of town tryout and then had tryout performances in Los Angeles (Civic Light Opera) and San Francisco. The latter production's opening night performance was greeted by roughly 250 to 300 picketers—some carrying signs reading, "Sakini Dyed for Our Sins"—whose spokesperson stated:

Asians should be given the right to audition ... and to refuse to take such roles in a racist play.

The musical premiered on Broadway at the Majestic Theatre on December 28, 1970 and closed on January 9, 1971 after 19 performances and three previews. Directed by Lawrence Kasha and choreographed by Marc Breaux, the cast included Kenneth Nelson as Sakini, David Burns as Colonel Wainwright Purdy III, Ron Husmann as Capt. Fisby, and Eleanor Calbes as Lotus Blossom.

Burns was nominated for the Tony Award for Best Actor in a Musical, and Freddy Wittop was nominated for Best Costume Design.

== Song list ==
Act I

- With a Snap of My Finger
- Right Hand Man
- Find Your Own Cricket
- One Side of the World
- Geisha
- You Say-They Say
- This Time
- Simple Word
- Garden Guaracha
- It's Good Enough for Lady Astor

Act II

- Chaya
- Call Me Back
- Lovely Ladies, Kind Gentlemen
- You've Broken a Fine Woman's Heart
- One More for the Last One

== Critical response ==
Critic Clive Barnes, in his review for The New York Times wrote: "Oh, dear! I come to bury Lovely Ladies, Kind Gentle man, [sic] not to praise it, but there were one or two decent things, and three or four half decent things, about this strangely dated musical that modestly opened last night at the Majestic Theater."

Douglas Watt, reviewing for the News, wrote "It is lively, colorful and generally engaging entertainment. The songs... are tuneful."

The group Oriental Actors of America picketed the Majestic Theatre on opening night because of the production's use of "yellowface."

== Awards and honors ==
=== Original Broadway production ===
Year	Award ceremony	Category	Nominee	Result
1971	Tony Award	Best Performance by a Leading Actor in a Musical	David Burns	Nominated
1971	Tony Award	Best Costume Design	Freddy Wittop	Nominated
