= The Sundowe =

The Sundowe is a musical written by Edinburgh-based writers and performers John, James and Gerry Kielty and featuring their band The Martians. The Sundowe was entered into the "Highland Quest For A New Musical" competition in early 2006 and was announced as the winner in July 2006. It was then produced by Cameron Mackintosh as a full stage musical, with the world premiere on 29 November 2007 at the new Eden Court Theatre in Inverness, Scotland. Following a three-week run at Eden Court it toured the Scottish Highlands in January and February 2008.

The story line centres on The Martians themselves, as their street busking is interrupted by vampires, the local council and the return of dead souls. The musical is part comedy, part pathos, and includes references to modern Scottish politics, Greyfriars Bobby, street busking and ancient Scottish history.

It has been described as "Shaun of the Dead meets Thriller", and is influenced by cult science fiction such as Doctor Who and Buffy the Vampire Slayer.

== Original cast ==
The Martians:

Rory - John Kielty
Jimmy - Gerry Kielty
Harry - Houston

The Authorities:

Roothby - Crawford Logan
Madam Godwin - Cora Bissett
First Minister - Harry Ward
Singing Policeman - Scott Garnham

Ambience Brigade:

Mr Jappy - Scott Garnham
Mr Geonst - Nick Underwood

The Vampyres:

Erich - Peter Kelly
Claus - Mark McDonnell
The Queen - Anne Kidd

The Prey:

Virgin - Jennifer Rhodes
Another Virgin - Tammy Joelle
Yet another Virgin - Cora Bissett

The Others:

Mum - Anne Kidd
Doorman - Nick Underwood
Aiden - Scott Garnham
Girl - Jennifer Rhodes
Husband - Scott Garnham
Wife - Cora Bissett
Free Church Minister - Peter Kelly
Reporter - Jennifer Rhodes
Mr Cunningham - Mark McDonnell
Lily - Rachel Marr/ Caitlin Marr

Other parts played by members of the cast.
