= Lord of Formosa =

2015 novel by Joyce Bergvelt

- First edition (Dutch)
- Author: Joyce Bergvelt
- Language: English
- Genre: Historical fiction
- Publisher: Camphor Press (original English version); Conserve (Dutch translation)
- Publication date: 2015 (Dutch translation); 26 April 2018 (original English version)
- Pages: 480
- ISBN: 978-1-78869-139-0

Lord of Formosa (Dutch: Formosa voorgoed verloren; historische roman over de VOC op Taiwan; "Formosa lost forever; historical novel about the Dutch East India Company in Taiwan") is an English-language historical novel by Dutch author Joyce Bergvelt. Its Dutch translation (author's own), which was the first version to be released, in 2015, was initially published by Conserve; the original English version, published by Camphor Press, was released in 2018. It chronicles Koxinga (Zheng Chenggong) and takes place during the period of Taiwan under Dutch rule. The (traditional) Chinese translation was published on 16 March 2023, as 福爾摩沙之王 by Avanguard (Qianwei) Publishing House, Taipei.

Hilton Yip of the Asian Review of Books stated that "Lord of Formosa is not so much a biography as it is a historical action novel with Koxinga as the main character."

== Plot ==
The book, which has a total of 566 pages, covers Koxinga's life, from the period which he was taken from Japan to China, and includes his expulsion of the Dutch. Koxinga's adventures, including two naval battles with the Dutch, make up portions until the mid-point of the novel, when the Manchus sack his estate. The second half of the novel ends after Koxinga defeats the Dutch, and he dies of an illness.

The novel has a focus on areas in Taiwan in and around the forts established by the Dutch. A portion of the novel takes place in Batavia, Dutch East Indies (now Jakarta, Indonesia). Incidents of rape, murder, and sex are occurrences.

According to Yip, the novel's Koxinga is "a flawed but driven warrior" who "is not romanticized or lionized, but neither is it easy to develop much admiration or sympathy for him." Bradley Winterton of the Taipei Times stated that "Koxinga himself is generally shown as an unsympathetic figure, but someone who nevertheless usually keeps his word." Yip stated that there were relatively few Taiwanese characters while many of the characters were Dutch, and that the latter "perhaps unsurprisingly, feature prominently".

== Background ==
Bergvelt was born in the Netherlands, but she mostly grew up abroad and was primarily educated in the United Kingdom, where she studied Chinese Studies at Durham University.

Bergvelt's father, an employee of Philips, worked in Taiwan, Japan, and the United Kingdom. Bergvelt, who had lived in the latter two due to her father's work, came to Taiwan in 1982 where she took up studying Chinese at National Taiwan Normal University (NTNU); she did so for one year. 19 at the time, she first learned about the history of Taiwan. After her studies ended, she visited her parents until they departed in 1988. She had last visited Taiwan in 1995.

Bergvelt wrote a thesis about the Dutch rule and Koxinga's removal of the Dutch for her Chinese/history programme at Durham University; the professors who read the thesis believed it was entertaining and told her that it had similarities to a novel. Therefore, she used it as the basis of a novel. The period she took to write the novel was about three and one half years. The Dutch translation was published in 2015; the interest initially coming from Dutch publishers was the reason why the Dutch translation was published first. The original English version was published on 26 April 2018.

== Reception ==
Yip gave the novel four of five stars. He stated that overall it was "a fantastic action-packed novel that showcases this major historical figure from Taiwan’s past." He described the pacing and flow as having "little confusion and no lull" and that "Bergvelt links the various events and places well". He criticised how Koxinga and other characters "can at times seem one-dimensional" as well as the novel not having many details about portions of Taiwan away from the Dutch forts.

Winterton stated that the original English version is "excellent".

== See also ==
- The Sino-Dutch War 1661
