= The Teahouse of the August Moon (novel) =

1951 novel by Vern Sneider

- First edition
- Author: Vern Sneider
- Language: English
- Genre: Comedy: Fiction
- Set in: Okinawa, Japan
- Publisher: Putnam; Camphor Press
- Publication date: 1951 (2018)
- Publication place: United States
- Media type: Print (Hardcover)
- Pages: 282 pp (first edition)
- OCLC: 429098

The Teahouse of the August Moon is a novel by Vern Sneider published in 1951. The book subsequently was adapted for a play (1953) and film (1956) with the same titles, both written by John Patrick, and later in 1970, the Broadway musical Lovely Ladies, Kind Gentlemen by Patrick and Stan Freeman. It depicts the activities of U.S. Army military government officers and personnel in occupied Okinawa following World War II. The novel was republished in 2018 by Camphor Press.
