= Camphor Press =

British-Taiwanese independent publisher

- Status: Dissolved
- Founded: 2014; 12 years ago
- Founder: Michael Cannings; John Grant Ross; Mark Swofford
- Country of origin: Taiwan
- Headquarters location: Manchester, England
- Nonfiction topics: East Asia
- Fiction genres: East Asia
- Imprints: Camphor Press; Eastbridge Books
- Official website: camphorpress.com

Camphor Press was a British independent publisher primarily focusing on books about East Asia. The company started as a digital-only publisher focused on providing a platform for English-language writing about Taiwan, before moving into print books in 2015. In 2017 Camphor Press acquired the backlist of US press EastBridge, reissuing those books under the Eastbridge Books imprint. Camphor Press has also acquired the rights to a number of out-of-print titles about Taiwan and the wider region. The company was dissolved in 2024.

== Imprints ==
- Camphor Press: East Asia-related fiction and non-fiction for the general reader
- Eastbridge Books: East Asia-related academic books and literary translations

== Notable publications ==
- Sneider, Vern (2016) [1953], A Pail of Oysters, Camphor Press, ISBN 978-1-910736-35-7
- Kerr, George H. (2017) [1965], Formosa Betrayed, Camphor Press Limited, ISBN 978-1-910736-53-1
- Carroll, Quincy (2017) [2016], Up to the Mountains and Down to the Countryside, Camphor Press Limited, ISBN 978-1-910736-50-0
- Bergvelt, Joyce (2018), Lord of Formosa, ISBN 978-1-78869-139-0
- Buck, Pearl S. (2019) [1936], The Exile, Introduction by Charles W. Hayford, ISBN 978-1-78869-049-2
- Buck, Pearl S. (2019) [1937], Fighting Angel, Introduction by Charles W. Hayford, ISBN 978-1-910736-97-5
