= The Curious Savage =

Comedic play by John Patrick

- Playbill Cover featuring Lillian Gish from the 1950 premiere at the Martin Beck Theatre.
- Original language: English
- Written by: John Patrick
- Characters: Ethel P. Savage; Titus; Lily Belle; Samuel; Dr. Emmett; Miss Willie; Florence Williams; Fairy; Hannibal; Jeffrey; Mrs. Paddy
- Genre: Comedy
- Setting: Living room of "The Cloisters," a sanatorium

Premiere
- Date: October 24, 1950
- Place: Martin Beck Theatre; New York, NY

The Curious Savage, written by John Patrick, is a comedic play about Ethel P. Savage, an elderly woman whose husband recently died and left her approximately ten million dollars. Contrasting the kindness and loyalty of psychiatric patients with the avarice and vanity of "respectable" public figures, it calls into question conventional definitions of sanity while lampooning celebrity culture. The play was first produced in New York by the Theatre Guild and Lewis & Young at the Martin Beck Theatre and opened October 24, 1950, with Lillian Gish in the role of Ethel. Peter Glenville directed the production.

== Plot ==
=== Act l ===
The play opens with the five residents of a sanatorium awaiting a new resident. The current residents of the sanatorium, called The Cloisters, function normally, excepting one small ailment. Fairy May (a plain girl who has difficulty telling fantasy from truth) sees herself as a person of great beauty. Jeff (a concert pianist and military veteran) believes that he was horribly scarred in the war, even though he survived the plane crash that killed all his men without a scratch. Florence dotes on a doll as if it were her 5-year-old living son (who had died at infancy). Hannibal (a statistician who lost his reason after being replaced by an electronic calculator and not finding work again) believes himself to be a concert violinist, even though he cannot play the violin. Mrs. Paddy, who had been told by her husband to "shut up" years before, rarely speaks except to shout out protracted lists of things she hates (including electricity, which she has given up for Lent) She believes herself to be a great artist, though her painting style is simplistic.

Soon, Mrs. Savage (the widow of a millionaire) and her stepchildren arrive, and the five residents eavesdrop from the hallway outside. Ethel's three stepchildren, Titus (a U.S. senator), Lily Belle (a self-proclaimed ingenue), and Samuel (a judge), had been shocked to find out that their stepmother had set up a memorial fund with her money in order to help average people pursue their dreams. On the basis of her "eccentric" behavior (such as taking up acting and the goals of her fund) they had her committed to The Cloisters so that they could take the money from her. When Ethel's three stepchildren leave, the five inmates introduce themselves to Mrs. Savage. Mrs. Savage tells them of her escapades in the theater before they all leave for Garden Hour. She then reveals to Miss Willie, her nurse, and Dr. Emmett, her doctor, that she has hidden the money that her stepchildren tried to take from her.

=== Act II ===
The residents of The Cloisters ask Ethel about her stepchildren. She reveals the sad history of her unpleasant "brood," when the stepchildren themselves arrive, trying to pry from her the whereabouts of the Savage fortune. She deceives each of them by giving fake locations for the fortune, and they are each sent on a wild goose chase in which they end up humiliating themselves. They return and convince Ethel to reveal the fortune, which is in the form of half-million dollar negotiable bonds. They are in the teddy bear that she has been carrying around with her, and Mrs. Savage is about to hand them over, only to have Mrs. Paddy turn out the lights. The room is thrown into darkness and chaos. When the lights come back on, the money is gone.

=== Act III ===
The staff begin to search for Mrs. Paddy and the bonds. After much effort from all, Mrs. Paddy is found, but she does not have the bonds. Dr. Emmett asks Miss Willie to search Fairy May. When Fairy returns from being searched, she exclaims there is a fire upstairs in Mrs Paddy’s bathtub. No one believes her and they all continue arguing. Jeff and Florence both falsely confess to taking the bonds, perhaps in an attempt to protect whomever they believe to be the guilty party. Hannibal then tells Dr. Emmet that he knows a woman took the bonds, because he was pushed during the blackout by a woman wearing perfume. He smells Lily Belle, but not her perfume. He smells smoke, and Ms. Willie brings in the burnt bundle of bonds. The siblings leave in frustration. The Doctor tells Ethel that she can leave if she wants to. Each of her new friends bestow a going away gift to Ethel. Miss Willie reveals that she is Jeff’s wife and works at the Cloisters in hopes that he one day remembers her. She also reveals that it was she who took the bonds and just pretended to burn them. Ethel, empowered, takes the bonds and leaves the Cloisters, having a final vision of her five new friends as happy and fulfilled. Jeff is playing the piano without flaw. Hannibal on the violin is perfect. Mrs. Paddy has painted a masterpiece. Florence is with a real living child. Fairy May is beautiful.

== Theme ==
Primarily a comedy, the play sets up a contrast between the patients and Mrs. Savage's stepchildren. By the end of the play, the viewer wonders who the crazy ones really are.

Playwright John Patrick states in his foreword to his play: "It is important in 'The Curious Savage' that the gentle inmates of The Cloisters be played with warmth and dignity. Their home is not an asylum nor are these good people lunatics. Any exaggeration of the roles will rob them of charm and humor. The whole point of the play is to contrast them with Mrs. Savage's children and the insane outside world. To depart from this point of view for the sake of easy laughs will rob the play of its meaning."

== Characters ==
=== The Residents ===
Florence Williams: (20s-40s) The elegant "mother" of The Cloisters, she believes she has a five-year-old son named John Thomas; in fact, John Thomas is a doll. During Mrs. Savage's stay at The Cloisters, Florence believes that John Thomas has the measles.

Fairy May: (early 20s) Fairy is a compulsive liar who is obsessed with having others love her. She is unkempt throughout the play, but believes herself to be stunningly beautiful. She is also very childlike, behaving and speaking in the tone of a six-year-old.

Jeffrey: (20s-30s) Once a military pilot, Jeff was shot down in the war, surviving a crash that killed all his men. He now believes that he has a scar on his face, which he constantly hides from others. He plays the piano, but is too shy to do so around other people. He is also married to Miss Willie, but does not remember that he is, due to the crash. Miss Willie works at the Cloisters in the hopes that one day her Jeffrey will remember her.

Hannibal: (20s-40s) Hannibal, once a statistician, was fired and replaced by an electronic calculator. He has then taken up the violin, which he wrongly believes he can play beautifully. He is a kind man with a vast array of knowledge stored in his sometimes sarcastic head.

Mrs. Paddy: (40s-50s) Mrs. Paddy paints with the quality of Hannibal's violin playing. She paints only seascapes, which strikes Hannibal as "odd, because she's never seen the ocean." The other patients say that Mrs. Paddy stopped talking when her husband told her to "shut up" one day, and she hasn't spoken since. She only speaks to announce what she hates. She hates "everything in the world." Her main lines are lists of random things she hates, strung together loosely alphabetically. Her tirades are ignored by the other characters. She has given up electricity for Lent and turns off all the lights multiple times throughout the play, causing mayhem.

=== The Savages ===
Titus: He is the eldest stepson of Mrs. Savage. He has been sent so many threatening letters that he is listed by Western Union as a "tangible asset"; Titus is the least popular senator in congress. He is sober, humorless, and direct. Titus also has a temper that tends to come out most when dealing with his stepmother.

Lily Belle: Lily Belle, the middle stepchild, was once married to a Slovak prince, and has remarried five times since then. A celebrity heiress, she is arrogant, chic, and self-assured. She is also very selfish and is constantly putting forth the effort to make sure others are respecting her. When Lily Belle first met Ethel, she bit her new stepmother's finger and has promptly been just as vicious ever since.

Samuel: The youngest stepchild of Ethel, Samuel has the distinction of being the judge with the most overturned decisions in the U.S. He walks in the shadows of his siblings, offering a sassy, short comment every once in a while, only to be shot down.

Mrs. Ethel P. Savage: Referred to as "Mrs. Savage" for the majority of the play, she is a witty, kindhearted, blue haired woman with a shifted viewpoint of humanity. The events of the play are centered around her and her decision to hide the money which she has inherited from her late husband from her greedy stepchildren, to give away to those less fortunate or to fulfill others' random, yet important lifelong dreams. She dislikes her stepchildren, but learns to love the residents of The Cloisters, accepting their own realities and delusions with an open-mindedness that others on the outside do not.

=== The Staff ===
Dr. Emmett: The staff doctor for this wing of The Cloisters, Dr. Emmett is kind, warmhearted, and he works hard to help his patients.

Miss "Willie" Wilhelmina: Miss Willie is an administrative assistant and nurse. She is married to Jeff, but struggles to pretend not to be because he doesn't remember her. She occasionally calls Jeff her pet name "Bingo." He is the reason she is working here, but she is nonetheless extremely kind and understanding towards all the residents of The Cloisters.

== Sources ==
- http://www.ericdsnider.com/theater/the-curious-savage/
- http://www.djmproductions.net/savg.html
- http://www.sodburyplayers.org.uk/Plays/2006CuriousSavage.html - Sodbury Players
