= John Patrick (dramatist) =

American dramatist (1905–1995)

- Born: John Patrick Goggin; May 17, 1905; Louisville, Kentucky, United States
- Died: November 7, 1995 (aged 90); Delray Beach, Florida, United States
- Spouse: Mildred Legaye (m. 1925)
- Writing career
- Notable works: The Curious Savage (1950); The World of Suzie Wong (1960)
- Notable awards: Pulitzer Prize for Drama (1954)

John Patrick (May 17, 1905 – November 7, 1995) was an American playwright and screenwriter.

== Biography ==
He was born John Patrick Goggin in Louisville, Kentucky. His parents soon abandoned him, and he spent a delinquent youth in foster homes and boarding schools. At age 19, he secured a job as an announcer at KPO Radio in San Francisco, California, marrying Mildred Legaye in 1925. He wrote over 1,000 scripts for the Cecil and Sally radio program (originally titled The Funniest Things), broadcast between 1928 and 1933. The show's sole actors were Patrick and Helen Troy. In 1937, Patrick wrote adaptations for NBC's Streamlined Shakespeare series, guest-starring Helen Hayes.

Produced on a tight budget, his first play, Hell Freezes Over, directed by Joshua Logan, had a brief run on Broadway in 1935. However, the credit opened the door for him as a Hollywood scriptwriter.

His unpublished play Glory Lane, was premiered in January 1935, at the Golden Bough Playhouse in Carmel-by-the-Sea, California by Ralph Bell.

In 1942, the play, The Willow and I, was produced with Martha Scott and Gregory Peck in the starring roles. Before its first night, Patrick had volunteered for the American Field Service providing medical services in support of the British Army fighting World War II. He served with Montgomery's Eighth Army in Egypt and subsequently saw action in India and Burma where the ideas for his next play The Hasty Heart were germinated. Patrick completed the play on the ship that returned him to the U.S. after the war, and it proved a great commercial success, being adapted for the screen in 1949, with Ronald Reagan as the star and for TV in 1983.

His next two plays, The Curious Savage (1950) and Lo and Behold (1951), fared less well, but it was his 1953 stage adaptation of Vern J. Sneider's novel The Teahouse of the August Moon that marked the height of his fame, winning both the Pulitzer Prize and Tony Award for drama. He adapted the play for the screen in 1956 and for the musical stage under the title Lovely Ladies, Kind Gentlemen in 1970. In 1954, he wrote the screenplay for the movie Three Coins in the Fountain and in 1955, he adapted the autobiographical book A Many-Splendoured Thing by Han Suyin, for the movie Love Is a Many-Splendored Thing.

His next play, Good as Gold (1957), was less well received, and most of the rest of his career was dedicated to a series of successful screenwriting assignments. Following his success with The Hasty Heart, Patrick bought the 65 acres (26 ha) estate Hasty Hill at Suffern, New York. He later moved to Saint Thomas, United States Virgin Islands.

On November 7, 1995, the 90-year-old playwright was found dead in his room with a plastic bag over his head. His death was ruled a suicide. Patrick is now best remembered for his screen work though his plays remain popular with community theatres.

The John Patrick Collection, including the playwright's books, letters, and manuscripts is held at the Rare Book Department of Boston University.

== Works ==
=== Theatre productions ===
- Glory Lane, 1935, Golden Bough Playhouse, Carmel, CA
- Hell Freezes Over, 28 December 1935, Ritz Theatre, New York, NY
- The Willow and I, 10 December 1942, Windsor Theatre, New York, NY
- The Hasty Heart, 3 January 1945, Hudson Theatre, New York, NY
- The Story of Mary Surratt, 8 February 1947, Henry Miller's Theatre, New York, NY
- The Curious Savage, 24 October 1950, Martin Beck Theatre, New York, NY
- Lo and Behold!, 12 December 1951, Booth Theatre, New York, NY
- The Teahouse of the August Moon, adapted from Vern Sneider's novel, 15 October 1953, Martin Beck Theatre, New York, NY
- Good as Gold, 7 March 1957, Belasco Theatre, New York, NY
- Juniper and the Pagans, 10 December 1959, Colonial Theatre, Boston, MA
- Everybody Loves Opal, 11 October 1961, Longacre Theatre, New York, NY
- It's Been Wonderful, September 1966, Albuquerque Little Theatre, Albuquerque, NM
- Scandal Point, September 1967, Albuquerque Little Theatre, Albuquerque, NM
- Everybody's Girl, September 1968, Albuquerque Little Theatre, Albuquerque, NM
- Love Is a Time of Day, 22 December 1969, Music Box Theatre, New York, NY
- A Barrel Full of Pennies, 12 May 1970, Playhouse on the Mall, Paramus, NJ
- Lovely Ladies, Kind Gentlemen, 28 December 1970, Majestic Theatre, New York, NY
- Opal Is a Diamond, 27 July 1971, Flat Rock Playhouse, Flat Rock, NC
- The Savage Dilemma, 19 May 1972, Long Beach Community Theatre, Long Beach, CA
- The Dancing Mice, June 1972, Berea Summer Theatre, Berea, OH
- Macbeth Did It, July 1972, Flat Rock Playhouse, Flat Rock, NC
- The Enigma, 12 June 1973, Berea Summer Theatre, Berea, OH
- Opal's Baby, 26 June 1973, Flat Rock Playhouse, Flat Rock, NC
- Roman Conquest, 25 July 1973, Berea Summer Theatre, Berea, OH
- A Bad Year for Tomatoes, 1974, John Patrick Dinner Theatre at the You Are Cabaret Dinner Theatre, North Royalston, OH
- Divorce, Anyone?, 1975, John Patrick Dinner Theatre at the You Are Cabaret Dinner Theatre, North Royalston, OH
- Opal's Husband, 1975, Flat Rock Playhouse, Flat Rock, NC
- Noah's Animals, 1975, Berea Summer Theatre, Berea, OH
- Suicide, Anyone?, 1976, Fortuna Theatre Club, St. Thomas, Virgin Islands
- People!, October 1976, John Patrick Dinner Theatre at the You Are Cabaret Dinner Theatre, North Royalston, OH
- Opal's Million Dollar Duck, 1979, School of Performing Arts, St Thomas, Virgin Islands
- Girls of the Garden Club, July 1979, Berea Summer Theatre, Berea, OH
- That's Not My Father, 1979, Fortuna Theatre Club, St Thomas, Virgin Islands
- The Savage Dilemma, 13 March 2018, Titirangi Community Theatre, Auckland, New Zealand
- The Curious Savage, 13 December 2018, Abraham Lincoln High School, San Francisco, CA

=== Screenplays ===
- Charlie Chan at the Race Track, Twentieth Century-Fox, 1936
- Educating Father, Twentieth Century-Fox, 1936
- 36 Hours to Kill, Twentieth Century-Fox, 1936
- High Tension, Twentieth Century-Fox, 1936
- Midnight Taxi, Twentieth Century-Fox, 1937
- Dangerously Yours, Twentieth Century-Fox, 1937
- The Holy Terror, Twentieth Century-Fox, 1937
- Time Out For Romance, Twentieth Century-Fox, 1937
- Sing and Be Happy, Twentieth Century-Fox, 1937
- Born Reckless, Twentieth Century-Fox, 1937
- One Mile From Heaven, Twentieth Century-Fox, 1937
- Big Town Girl, Twentieth Century-Fox, 1937
- Up the River Heaven, Twentieth Century-Fox, 1937
- Look Out, Mr. Moto, Twentieth Century-Fox, 1938
- Five of a Kind, Twentieth Century-Fox, 1938
- International Settlement, Twentieth Century-Fox, 1938
- Battle of Broadway, Twentieth Century-Fox, 1938
- Mr. Moto Takes a Chance, Twentieth Century-Fox, 1938
- High Society, adapted from Philip Barry's play, The Philadelphia Story, MGM, 1956
- Teahouse of the August Moon, MGM, 1956
- Les Girls, adapted from Vera Caspary's novel, MGM, 1957
- Some Came Running, adapted from James Jones's novel, MGM, 1958
- The World of Suzie Wong, adapted from Paul Osborn's play and Richard Mason's novel, Paramount, 1960
- Parrish, adapted from Mildred Savage's novel, for Warner Brothers, 1961
- Gigot, adapted from Jackie Gleason's story, Twentieth Century-Fox, 1962
- The Main Attraction, MGM-Seven Arts, 1963
- The Shoes of the Fisherman, adapted from Morris West's novel, MGM, 1968

=== Television scripts ===
- "Teahouse of the August Moon," Hallmark Hall of Fame, NBC, 1962
- "The Small Miracle," adapted from Paul Gallico's short story, Hallmark Hall of Fame, NBC, 1973

=== Publications ===
- The Willow and I (New York: Dramatists Play Service, 1943)
- The Hasty Heart (New York: Dramatists Play Service, 1945)
- The Story of Mary Surratt (New York: Dramatists Play Service, 1947)
- The Curious Savage (New York: Dramatists Play Service, 1951)
- Lo and Behold!; A New Comedy in Three Acts (New York: S. French, 1952)
- The Teahouse of the August Moon (New York: Dramatists Play Service, 1957)
- Everybody Loves Opal (New York: Dramatists Play Service, 1962)
- It's Been Wonderful (New York: Dramatists Play Service, 1966)
- Everybody's Girl; a Comedy in Three Acts, (New York: Dramatists Play Service, 1968)
- Scandal Point; a Play in Three Acts, (New York: Dramatists Play Service, 1969)
- Love Is a Time of Day (New York: Dramatists Play Service, 1970)
- A Barrel Full of Pennies: A Comedy in Two Acts (New York: Dramatists Play Service, 1971)
- Lovely Ladies, Kind Gentlemen (New York: S. French, 1971)
- Anybody Out There (New York: Dramatists Play Service, 1972)
- Divorce--Anyone?: Three One Act Plays (New York: Dramatists Play Service, 1976)
- Noah's Animals: A Musical Allegory in Three Acts (New York: S. French, 1976)
- Suicide--Anyone?: Three One Act Plays (New York: Dramatists Play Service, 1976)
- The Girls of the Garden Club: A Comedy in Three Acts (New York: Dramatists Play Service, 1980)
- Opal's Million Dollar Duck (New York: Dramatists Play Service, 1980)
- People!: Three One Act Plays (New York: S. French, 1980)
- That's Not My Mother: Three One Act Plays (New York: S. French, 1980)
- The Magenta Moth: A Play in Three Acts (New York: Dramatists Play Service, 1983)
- The Reluctant Rogue, or, Mother's Day: A Play (New York: Dramatists Play Service, 1984)
- Cheating Cheaters: A Comedy (New York: Dramatists Play Service, 1985)
- The Gay Deceiver: A Play in Three Acts (New York: Dramatists Play Service, 1988)
- The Doctor Will See You Now: Four One-Act Plays (New York: Dramatists Play Service, 1991)
- Dirty Ditties (New York: Penguin, 1996)
- A Bad Year for Tomatoes (New York: Dramatists Play Service, 1975)

== Awards and nominations ==
- Academy Award nomination for Best Writing, Original Motion Picture Story for The Strange Love of Martha Ivers (1946).

== Sources ==
- Pace, Eric (9 November 1995). "John Patrick, Pulitzer Winner For 'Teahouse,' Is Dead at 90". New York Times.
- Wilmer, Jr., Harry A (1955). "Psychiatrist on Broadway". American Imago. 12 (2): 157–78.
