= Stan Freeman =

American musician (1920–2001)

Stanley Freeman (April 3, 1920 – January 13, 2001) was an American composer, pianist, lyricist, musical arranger, conductor, and studio musician.

== Biography ==
Born in Waterbury, Connecticut, Freeman studied classical piano in college and earned a Bachelor of Music degree from the University of Hartford.

After serving in World War II, he joined Tex Beneke's big band, eventually leaving to perform as a pianist and later a comic in nightclubs. Freeman's work as a studio musician included sessions with Frank Sinatra, Peggy Lee, Ella Fitzgerald, Percy Faith, Mabel Mercer, Charlie Parker, and Rosemary Clooney. Freeman played harpsichord on Clooney's hit "Come on-a My House." He also played harpsichord on Faith's "Delicado", a no. 1 hit in 1952.

Premiering in 1964, Freeman's first Broadway project was the Buddy Hackett vehicle I Had a Ball. Later, he composed the score for Lovely Ladies, Kind Gentlemen, the short-lived 1970 musical adaptation of The Teahouse of the August Moon. His other work on Broadway included conducting Broadway concerts for Marlene Dietrich's Broadway concerts in 1967 and 1968 and providing arrangements for three of Michael Feinstein's Broadway outings. Freeman was nominated for the 1992 Drama Desk Award for Outstanding Solo Performance/One Person Show for At Wit's End, a tribute to Oscar Levant.

Freeman's television work included composing special musical material for Carol Burnett and Mary Tyler Moore. With Arthur Malvin he shared the Emmy Award for Outstanding Achievement in Special Musical Material for the mini-musical Hi-Hat performed by Burnett with guest Fred Astaire on the January 8, 1978 episode of her eponymous television variety series.

Freeman's solo recordings include Piano Sweethearts, Piano Moods, Come on-a Stan's house: Stan Freeman at the Harpsichord, Fascination, Manhattan, At the Blue Angel, and Everybody's Twistin'.

Freeman died of emphysema in Los Angeles, California at the age of 80.

== See also ==
- List of jazz arrangers
- Secrets Every Smart Traveler Should Know, musical comedy revue
