= Miss Saigon controversy =

Controversy over 1989 stage musical

Numerous controversies arose in connection with the 1989 stage musical Miss Saigon during the show's 1990 transfer to Broadway, reaching their peak around August 1990. Afterwards, controversies surrounding the production continued through the early 1990s.

== Casting controversies of 1990 ==
=== Jonathan Pryce ===
Miss Saigon received criticism for the perception it contained racist or sexist overtones, including protests regarding its portrayal of Asians and women in general. Originally, Jonathan Pryce and Keith Burns, white actors playing Eurasian/Asian characters, wore eye prostheses and bronzing cream to make themselves look more Asian, which outraged some who drew comparisons to a "minstrel show". The American scholar Yutian Wong observed Miss Saigon's 1989 premiere in London's West End had uniformly positive reviews in British newspapers such as the Daily Mail, The Times, and the Evening Standard. British theater critics did not perceive anything objectionable about the musical, and the controversy about Miss Saigon only began in 1990 with the prospect of it appearing on Broadway, which Wong argued, was because the United States has a much larger Asian population than the United Kingdom.

In the London production of Miss Saigon, Lea Salonga originally starred as Kim, with Jonathan Pryce as the Engineer. When the production transferred from London to New York City, the Actors' Equity Association (AEA) refused to allow Pryce, a white actor, to portray the role of the Engineer, a Eurasian pimp, in the United States. The playwright David Henry Hwang and the actor B.D Wong wrote public letters of protest against Pryce's casting. Both Hwang and Wong had seen Miss Saigon in London's West End and felt Pryce's performance as the Engineer was demeaning to Asians. As Alan Eisenberg, executive secretary of Actors' Equity explained: "The casting of a Caucasian actor made up to appear Asian is an affront to the Asian community. The casting choice is especially disturbing when the casting of an Asian actor, in the role, would be an important and significant opportunity to break the usual pattern of casting Asians in minor roles." AEA's ruling on 7 August 1990 led to criticism from many, including the British Actors' Equity Association, citing violations of the principles of artistic integrity and freedom. Producer Cameron Mackintosh threatened to cancel the show, despite massive advance ticket sales. The Miss Saigon casting debate made it to the front pages of The New York Times 8 times in August 1990. Editorials in the Los Angeles Times, The Washington Post, USA Today, and The Wall Street Journal published over the course of one week in August 1990 insisted Pryce should be cast as the Engineer on Broadway.

Though there had been a long, well-publicised international search for Asian actresses to play Kim, there had been no equivalent search for Asian actors to play the major Asian male roles—specifically, those of the Engineer (Pryce) and Thuy (Keith Burns). The American scholar Angelica Pao observed that, in the first production of Miss Saigon in London, Macintosh had gone out of his way to cast Asian actresses to play the Vietnamese women, arguing that this was necessary to provide authenticity, but he was content to cast white actors as Vietnamese men. However, others mentioned the Engineer was Eurasian (French-Vietnamese), arguing Pryce was being discriminated against on the basis that he was Caucasian. Also, Pryce was considered by many in Europe to have "star status," a clause that allows a well-known foreign actor to recreate a role on Broadway without an American casting call. After pressure from Mackintosh, the general public, and many of its own members, Actors' Equity reversed its decision. Pryce starred alongside Salonga and Willy Falk (as Chris) when the show opened on Broadway.

=== Lea Salonga ===
During the production transfer from West End to Broadway, another controversy that made global news erupted over Salonga's citizenship, as she was Filipina. The Actors' Equity Association (AEA) initially prevented her from reprising her role, wishing to give priority to Asian-American performers. However, Cameron Mackintosh claimed that he was unable to find a satisfactory replacement for Salonga despite the extensive search in which 1,200 candidates auditioned. Government officials in the Philippines expressed support for her, and her father threatened to return a United States flag that was given to the family after the death of his father, who served in the U.S. Navy for 30 years. Filipino columnist Max Soliven wrote: "It's sad that some Americans, in a land which has long preached equality of man and equal opportunity, have become such rabid, racial bigots."

Salonga told The Seattle Times, "It's not the end of the world. If Broadway does happen, then fine, it's great. If it doesn't, I'm not going to be a sourpuss. I'll probably go back to school or continue doing Kim in London. It's really up to me what I want to do." In the same interview, she also noted that reprising the role on Broadway "would mean another chance for the Filipino to get a foot in the door, and hopefully push it open all the way." On January 7, 1991, arbitrator Daniel Gerald Collins, a law professor at New York University, reversed the AEA ruling to allow Salonga to star. Five months later, Salonga thanked the labor union during her acceptance speech for her win at the 45th Tony Awards.

== Orientalism, racism, and misogyny ==
=== Background ===
The question of accepting Vietnamese refugees was just as relevant in 1980s Britain as it was in the United States. Beginning in 1978, a vast exodus of people known as the "boat people" fled from Vietnam via boat, and many of them crossed the South China Sea to apply for asylum in the British colony of Hong Kong. British newspapers commonly called the refugees "Vietnamese boat people", but the term was something of a misnomer as the majority of the "boat people" were actually Hoa (ethnic Chinese) who suffered severely under Vietnam's Communist government. As was the case with the other nations of Southeast Asia, a disproportionate number of the middle-class people in Vietnam were ethnic Chinese, who were widely disliked on the account of their success in business and the professions. On 17 February 1979, Vietnam's ancient archenemy China invaded, leading to a short and sharp war. Though Vietnam defeated China, the war pushed anti-Chinese feelings in Vietnam to a hysterical level, leading to most of the Hoa fleeing Vietnam. As Britain had ratified the Vienna convention, the British authorities in Hong Kong had to consider the refugee applications of the "boat people", and many of the "boat people" did end up settling in the United Kingdom. British tabloids stoked fears about the possibility of the "Vietnamese boat people" overwhelming Britain, and falsely stated that most of them were infected with leprosy, prompting a popular outcry to stop the "boat people" from coming to the United Kingdom.

==== Composition ====
Shimakawa further criticized Boublil and Schönberg for using no Vietnamese instruments and music in Miss Saigon, instead using instruments from Japan and Indonesia which she argued represented the attitude that Vietnam was just an exotic locale in Asia that Westerners might have adventures in, not an entity in its own right with its own culture and history. Shimkawa argued that the musical's logo, a painting of a helicopter done in a manner highly evocative of Chinese calligraphy, reflected the musical's perspective that all Asian cultures were just "mysterious aesthetics" for Westerners as the viewpoint in Miss Saigon is that all of Asia, not just Vietnam, is "inscrutable and/or incomprehensible (although potentially aesthetically and sexually pleasurable), defining Americaness in opposition". Finally, Shimakawa said the claim by Boublil and Schönberg as Frenchmen to have a special understanding of Vietnam because Vietnam is a former French colony went largely unchallenged by the British media when Miss Saigon premiered in London in 1989 and likewise by the American media when Miss Saigon made its debut in New York in 1991, which she argued reflected the tendency in the West to place a premium on white views of Asians over Asian views of themselves.

===== Romanticism =====
In the 1991 book The Story of Miss Saigon by the Anglo-French journalist Edward Behr and the Canadian columnist Mark Steyn, the claim by Boublil and Schönberg as Frenchmen to have a special "insider's knowledge" of the Vietnamese is accepted as a fact, and Miss Saigon is portrayed as a historically accurate picture of the Vietnam war. The American scholar Yutian Wong complained about the first chapter of The Story of Miss Saigon written by Behr who covered the Vietnam War for Newsweek, where Behr confessed to sleeping with hundreds of Vietnamese prostitutes during his time in Saigon, experiences that convinced him that Miss Saigon was a realistic and accurate picture of Vietnam.

Wong charged that Behr made very sweeping claims about Vietnamese women, a subject on which he claimed to be an expert, based solely upon his experiences with the prostitutes, which she felt to be very misleading perspective on Vietnam. Wong wrote that Behr's nostalgic and romanticized account of prostitution in Saigon was "emptied of the violence, disease, abuse and humiliations suffered by the prostitutes themselves" that misleadingly made the brothels of Saigon sound benign and romantic. Wong also argued that Behr's claim that Miss Saigon was not racist and sexist because in real life the U.S. servicemen had a profound respect for the prostitutes whose services they used is contradicted by his statement that the slurs applied by the Marines to the prostitutes in Miss Saigon were merely "realistic", stating that the Marines in Vietnam did talk that way about Vietnamese women.

=== Orientalism ===
In Miss Saigon, Vietnam is portrayed as a mysterious, exotic, sensuous place yet full of incomprehensible savagery and incredible “filth”. The opening chorus of the first song "The Heat is On in Saigon" begins with the lines: "The heat is on in Saigon/The girls are hotter 'n hell/Tonight one of these slits will be Miss Saigon/God the tension is high/Not to mention the smell". The fact the Vietnam War impoverished many Vietnamese people, and forced many women to turn to prostitution in order to survive, is not mentioned in Miss Saigon, and establishments such as the fictional Dreamland brothel are portrayed as the norm in Vietnam.

At one point, Chris sings a song about Kim that is addressed both to her and Vietnam, suggesting that Kim is Vietnam. In the song "Why, God, Why?", Chris sings: "Who is that girl back in the rusty bed?/Why am I back in this filthy room?/Why is her voice ringing in my head?/Why am I high on her cheap perfume?/Vietnam/Hey look, I mean no offense/But why does nothing here make sense?" Throughout Miss Saigon, both Kim and Vietnam are described by the American characters as a "mystery," which the American scholar Karen Shimakawa felt reflected racist and misogynic views about Asians and Asian women in particular.

==== Perpetual foreigner and white imperialism ====
Shimakawa argued that the romance between the Marine Chris with Kim was intended as a message by Boublil and Schönberg about the legitimacy and justice of the Vietnam War with the submissive Kim looking up to Chris to protect and save her from her own people. The wedding between Chris and Kim is seen by the former as a mere spectacle for him to enjoy rather representing a binding commitment on his part to Kim, and he is very surprised to learn later on that Kim considers him to be her husband, an aspect of his character that he is not criticized for. Instead, Ellen explains to Kim that under American law she is Chris's wife, and Kim just merely accepts the supremacy of American law over Vietnamese law, which Shimakawa argued represents the viewpoint that Vietnam is merely a place that provides exotic spectacles for Chris and other Americans to enjoy. For Chris, his marriage to Ellen is his "real" marriage because American law is the legitimate social regulatory force; his marriage to Kim is a "pretty" spectacle for him as he phrases it and he does not consider Kim to be his wife. Shimakawa argued that the character of Ellen-whose role in the musical is to support Chris and to be jealous of Kim-serves to allow Chris to "signify his Americanness as male, heterosexual, and unavailable to Kim as an avenue to U.S. citizenship (through marriage)".

Shimakawa observed the song "The American Dream" (where the Engineer fantasizes about life in the United States and where he is shown as having clearly absurd notions about what American life is like) underlines the musical's point that the Engineer might become an American citizen, but he can never truly become an American. Shimakawa wrote: "'The American Dream' is performed for comic effect, but the message of the song is quite clear; that however much the Engineer wants to be an American, he is not and never can be 'one of us'". In "The American Dream" musical number, all of the lyrics sung by the Engineer as he fantasizes about American life relate only to his greed as he imagines America to be a land of boundless wealth that will make him very rich and he makes no mention whatsoever of American values like freedom and democracy as a reason to come to America. Wong felt that the message of "The American Dream" song was that Asian immigrants to America are only motivated by avarice and materialism whereas European immigrants are motivated by more idealistic motives such as the desire for freedom and democracy. The Engineer is a man who wants to escape from a Communist nation to the United States, yet the only motive that Miss Saigon gives him for wanting to flee is his greed, which was not how a man who wanted to escape from one of the Communist nations of Eastern Europe to the United States would have been portrayed.

Shimakawa wrote that in the musical, Vietnam only exists as a place that defines Americanness by way of contrast, observing the song "I'd Give My Life for You" recreates the evacuation of the American embassy in Saigon in April 1975, the South Vietnamese chorus who are unable to board the Marine helicopters sing: "No place, no home/No life, no hope/No change, no chance". Shimakawa argued that in the musical's climax, Kim shoots herself, which she maintained sent the message that Kim, unlike her half-American son Tam, never could become an American citizen because as a Vietnamese woman she does not belong in the United States. Shimakawa further maintained that the way that Chris has a passionate romance with Kim, but ends up marrying the white woman Ellen, causing Kim to commit suicide, reflects a long-standing Western trope where Asian women serve as a love interest for a white Western man, but always end up conveniently committing suicide to free up the white man to marry or to stay married to a white woman.

=== Racism ===
==== Asian masculinity ====
The idealized and passive character of Kim, who is portrayed as being the true Vietnam, stands in marked contrast to the male Vietnamese characters. Thuy, the Viet Cong man who wants to marry Kim is portrayed as violent, jealous, cruel and possessive, with an interest in Kim that is purely exploitative - as opposed to Chris's love. Thuy is portrayed as a "violent" and "barbaric" man in contrast to Kim who is "doggedly loyal and grateful to the United States" - this sets up a contrast between the "good" Vietnam that the Americans sought to defend vs. the "bad" Vietnam that rejected them.

===== The Engineer =====
The character of the vicious, sleazy pimp Tran Van Dinh aka the Engineer is a Eurasian man whose sexuality is “simply incomprehensible, illegible, indeterminate, even as it is spectacularly displayed”. Shimakawa described the Engineer as "simultaneously lascivious, sexually exploitative, pansexual and desexualized". The Engineer had a French father and a Vietnamese mother, but throughout the musical it is always his "orientalness" that he displays. Shimakawa wrote "the Engineer embodies an uncategorizable yet spectacular perversity-a condition that, the logic of the play suggests, is hereditary: it is the direct result of his racially and nationally mixed beginnings in prostitution and sexual debauchery”.

==== Black masculinity ====
Chris's best friend, the aptly named John, who is usually played by black actors as the character of John was envisioned by Boublil and Schönberg as African American, is an enthusiastic patron of the women of the Dreamland brothel, thereby playing to the stereotype of black men as having an unrestrained, lascivious sexuality. Unlike the romantic Chris, John sees the women of the Dreamland brothel only as sex objects, and is much given to crude, macho boasting about his sexual prowess. Shimakawa argued that the way that John is portrayed as Chris's sidekick is meant to suggest that, although he is an American, he does not embody the ideal American in the same way that Chris does.

==== White masculinity ====
In contrast to these examples of flawed masculinity, the white Chris is portrayed as a kind, gentle man with a genuine love and concern for Kim. At one point, he sings: “I wanted to save her, protect her/Christ, I’m an American/How could I fail to do good?” Chris explains his relationship with Kim to Ellen not in terms of love despite the fact that he married her and fathered a child by her, but rather out of a paternalist and implicitly colonialist concern for someone from an inferior Third World country. The character of Chris is inspired by the character of Lieutenant Pinkerton in Madame Butterfly, but unlike the unpleasant and selfish Pinkerton, the character of Chris is shown to be without moral faults as Schönberg commented "We didn't want Chris to be a bastard like Pinkerton". Wong wrote that it was telling that Boublil in an interview stated that the principal problem for him with Madame Butterfly was the callous and cruel nature of Pinkerton, which he "fixed" by making Chris into a far more likeable and sympathetic character than Pinkerton.

Shimakawa maintained that the "Sun and the Moon" theme song of Chris and Kim, which features the lyrics "You are sunlight and I, the moon/Joined by the gods of fortune/Midnight and high noon/Sharing the sky" is meant to emphasize the opposing nature of the East as embodied by Kim and the West as embodied by Chris. That the high noon and midnight by definition cannot share the same sky illustrates the musical's point that Chris and Kim, however deep their love may be, cannot be together as a couple as they are from different worlds that do not belong together. Schönberg stated when he and Boublil were writing Miss Saigon that the governing principle was that "the show is about East/West, male/female/, materialistic/fatalistic". Shimakawa criticized this aspect of Miss Saigon with its suggestion that the divisions between "East/West" are mutually exclusive and always will be with the apparent message that Asians can never truly become citizens of Western nations.

===== Imperialism and white supremacy =====
Shimakawa wrote that it was the Eurasian characters of the Engineer and Tam who are the only ones from Vietnam able to reach the United States, with Kim committing suicide seeming to send the message Americanness is defined in the musical at least partly in racial terms to "the extent that Tam and other biracial children are contemplated as even potentially American, their ties to their Vietnamese mothers are severed". In the song "Bui-Doi", John leads a chorus that sings: "They're called 'Bui-Doi'/They are living reminders of all the good we failed to do/That's why we know deep in our hearts/That they are all our children too". Shimakawa argued that "the curiously passive lament for 'all the good we failed to do' preempts the question of U.S responsibility or even agency" for the Vietnam War, suggesting that the war was a well-intentioned effort that unfortunately failed to work out as it should have. Shimakawa noted in the song "Bui-Doi" there is no mention of the Vietnamese mothers of these children who are portrayed as being the exclusive responsibility of their American fathers, which appears to suggest that to become American, the Vietnamese heritage of the "bui-doi" children must be suppressed as the musical seems to be arguing that a dual American-Vietnamese identity is impossible. Under American immigration law in the 1970s to 1980s, the "bui-doi" children were allowed to immigrate to the United States provided that they could prove that their fathers were American while the Vietnamese mothers of these children were excluded from coming to the United States. The perception in the United States that the Vietnamese mothers of the "bui-doi" children were all prostitutes led Congress to exclude them all as "undesirable aliens." This aspect of American immigration law is never criticized in Miss Saigon, and Kim herself comes to accept that it is only right and proper that the United States government exclude someone like herself from ever coming to America. The character of the Engineer who is sexually perverted and depraved in general seems to imply that immigration laws excluding Asians are in fact justified.

=== Misogyny ===
==== Submissiveness ====
The prostitute heroine Kim is portrayed as the “Lotus Blossom” archetype, the innocent but sexually available, frail, mysterious, demure and submissive Asian beauty whose life is defined by her love for a white man, in this case the American Marine Chris Scott. Every single Vietnamese female character in Miss Saigon is a prostitute, all but one of whom are "Dragon Ladies" who parade their bodies in string bikinis, which was seen as sustaining the Western stereotype of Asian women as being ultra-sexualized. The second act of the play, set in Thailand, portrays Thai women as all engaging in prostitution, which further reinforces the stereotype. Kim is the only woman at the Dreamland brothel who does not walk around all the time in a string bikini. The American scholar Wong Yutian described Miss Saigon as promoting the image of "an effeminzed and infantized Asia serving as a low-budget whorehouse for the West".

Wong felt that the fact that prostitutes in Miss Saigon are mostly teenagers, which is justified under the grounds that most of the prostitutes in the Vietnam War were also teenagers, sending the message: "Since Asian womanhood is undifferentiated from girlhood, teenage prostitution is a reasonable enough basis for a love story in which the conditions of Kim's occupation are easily overlooked and viewed as emotionally and economically normative". In 1999, when Miss Saigon was closing in London, a new advertising campaign was launched on the Tube featuring posters reading "You'll miss Saigon" that showed an Asian woman wearing a military jacket showing some cleavage, which Wong felt sent the message that "Asia equals prostitution". The passivity and moral purity of Kim, who is utterly faithful towards Chris despite his abandonment of her and their son in Vietnam and marriage to an American woman, Ellen, seems to suggest that the proper place of an Asian woman is to be subservient towards a white man. Despite her profession as a prostitute, the 17-year-old Kim is portrayed as a virginal innocent, in need of Chris's protection from the cruel world of Saigon. Wong wrote that even when Kim complains about her situation that: "Chris is her savior from Asian-style patriarchy, a fate far worse than prostitution. Imperialist discourse locates the fantasy of sex with white men-and not feminism-as a liberatory ideology. Justifying prostitution justifies colonization in the service of rescuing Asian women from the cultural backwardness (Asian men)".

==== Hypersexualization ====
In The Story of Miss Saigon, Behr wrote about the "extreme youth" of the prostitutes whose services he used, which led him to portray teenage prostitution in Vietnam as a charming coming-of-age ritual that led to moments of "pure joy" for the girls concerned. Wong wrote that, as a woman, she found this statement to be very offensive. As part of their defense of Miss Saigon, Steyn in the book accused the Asian-American activists who protested against racism in Miss Saigon of a "new tribalism" that threatened "a new era of conformity and sanctimoniousness". Most of the Asian actresses and dancers that appeared in the original West End production of Miss Saigon in 1989 were Filipina, and many were uncomfortable with the costumes they were expected to wear on stage and the sexually explicit dance numbers they were expected to perform. Steyn and Behr argued that their reluctance was due to their Roman Catholicism, leading Wong to write that it seemed not to interest either Behr or Steyn "that the material might actually be racially and sexually offensive to Asian women".

The Trinidadian-Canadian critic Richard Fung wrote in 1994: "If Miss Saigon were the only show about sexually available Asian women and money-grubbing Asian men, it wouldn't be a stereotype and there would be no protest-negative portrayals per se are not a problem". Fung argued that the way in which films, television and plays repeated such stereotypes ad nauseam had a damaging effect on the self-esteem of Asian-Americans, especially Asian-American women.
