= The Food Chain =

HIV/AIDS charity in London, England

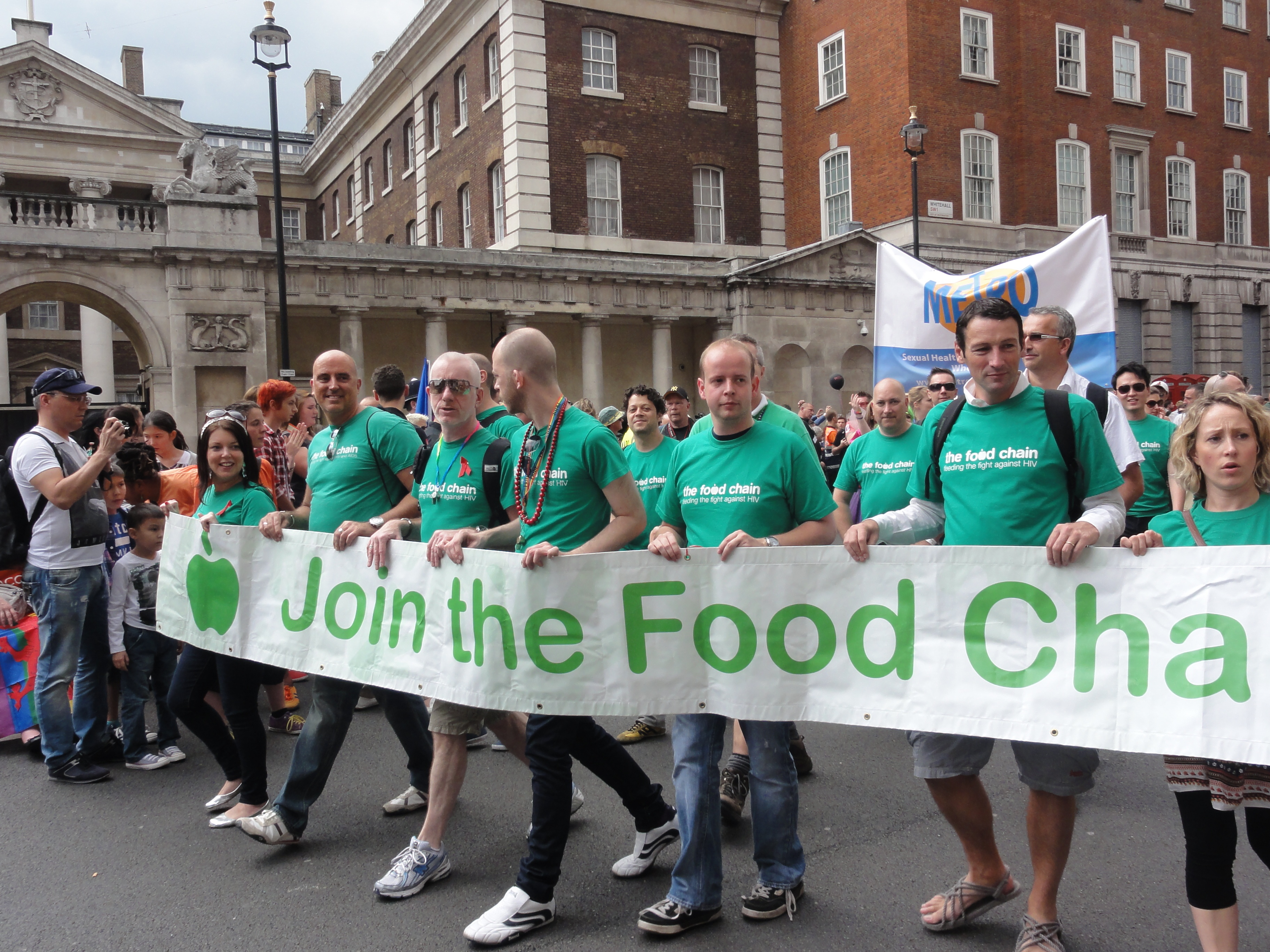
The Food Chain at Pride in London 2011

The Food Chain is a London, United Kingdom-based charity who provide nutritional support services for people living with HIV in London.

Formed on Christmas Day 1988, its stated aim is "to ensure people living with HIV in London can access the nutrition they need to get well, stay well and lead healthy, independent lives.". Using a large network of volunteers The Food Chain deliver meals and groceries, offers cookery and nutrition classes and communal eating opportunities to people living with HIV in London and their dependents. These are largely delivered from the Acorn House kitchen near King's Cross.

In 2005, The Food Chain won the Queen's Award for Volunteer Organisation of the Year. The Food Chain also won The Guardian Charity of the Year award in 2005, and the National Lottery 'Inspiration' award in 2006.
