= The Teahouse of the August Moon (play) =

1953 play by John Patrick

- 1953 playbill
- Original language: English
- Written by: Vern Sneider (novel); John Patrick (play)
- Characters: Captain Fisby; Sakini; Col. Wainright Purdy III; Captain McLean; Mr. Oshira; Lotus Blossom; The Daughter's Child; Mr. Sumata; Mr. Sumata's Father; Ancient Man; Sergeant Gregovich; Villagers
- Genre: Comedy
- Setting: Japan

Premiere
- Date: 15 October 1953
- Place: Martin Beck Theatre; New York City, New York

The Teahouse of the August Moon is a 1953 play written by John Patrick adapted from the 1951 novel by Vern Sneider. The play was later adapted for film in 1956, and the 1970 Broadway musical Lovely Ladies, Kind Gentlemen.

The play opened on Broadway in October 1953. It was a Broadway hit, running for 1,027 performances and winning awards including the New York Drama Critics Circle Award for Best American Play of the Year, the Pulitzer Prize in Drama, and the Tony Award. The play, well regarded for several decades, came to seem old-fashioned with increased understanding and sensitivity of racial issues. The portrayals of the Okinawa characters in the play were seen as offensive, and the generational humor began to lose its impact in the 1970s.

== Plot summary ==
In the aftermath of World War II, the island of Okinawa was occupied by the American military. Captain Fisby, a young army officer, is transferred to a tiny Okinawa island town called Tobiki by his commanding officer, Colonel Purdy. Fisby is tasked with the job of implementing "Plan B". The plan calls for teaching the natives all things American and the first step for Capt. Fisby is to establish a democratically elected mayor, chief of agriculture, chief of police, and president of the Ladies League for Democratic Action. Plan "B" also calls for the building of a schoolhouse (Pentagon shaped), democracy lessons, and establishing capitalism through means left up to the good captain's judgment. A local Tobiki native, Sakini by name, is assigned to act as Fisby's interpreter. Sakini, a Puck-like character, attempts to acquaint Fisby with the local customs as well as guide the audiences through the play, providing both historical and cultural framework through his asides and monologues.

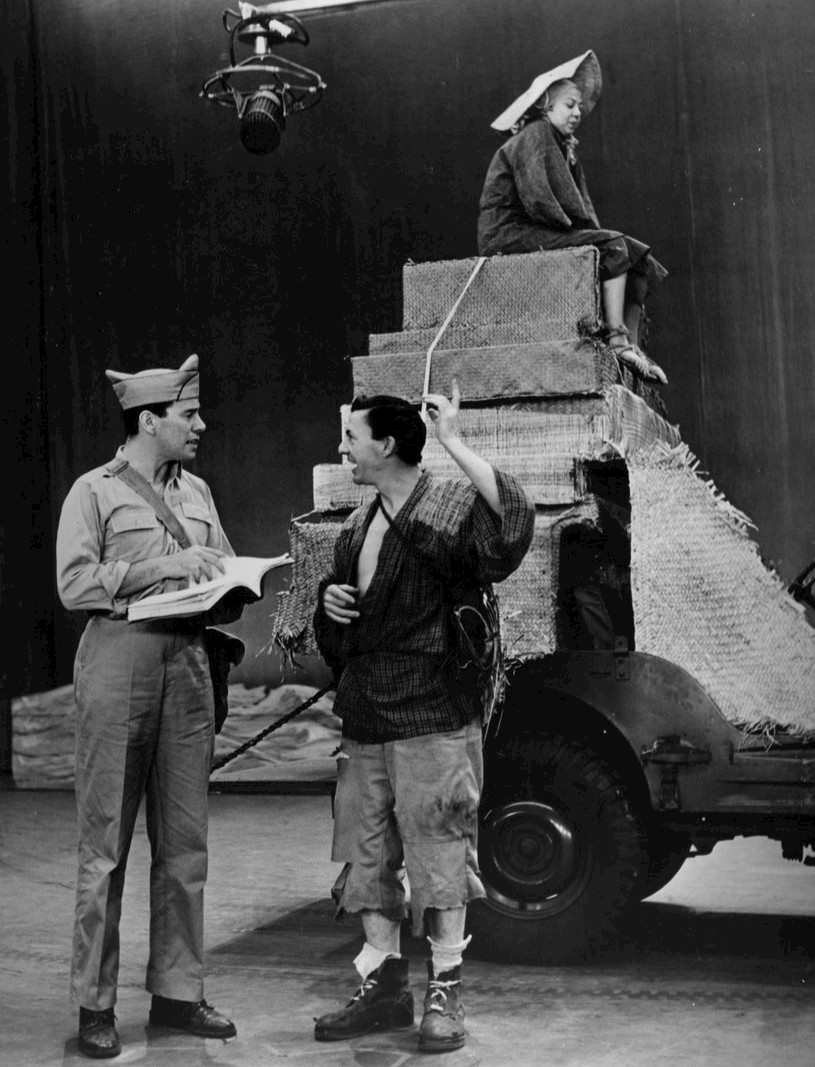
John Forsythe as Fisby and David Wayne as Sakini on Broadway in 1954

After receiving many gifts from the villagers, including a geisha named Lotus Blossom, Fisby tries to find local products on which to build his capitalist endeavor. He is discouraged when the villagers can not find a market for their handmade products, items like geta (wooden sandals), lacquered bowls, cricket cages, and casas (straw hats). He is also frustrated when the newly elected democratic government votes to build a teahouse (ochaya) for Lotus Blossom with the building supplies designated for his Pentagon-shaped school. Through the villagers, Captain Fisby starts to see the beauty of preserving their culture and a slower way of life. He agrees to build the teahouse and even lands on a moneymaking product – sweet potato brandy. Soon the Cooperative Brewing Company of Tobiki is churning out liquor by the gallon and selling it to all the neighboring military bases.

The gala opening of the teahouse is the moment when Colonel Purdy decides to make his progress inspection and finds Captain Fisby serenading the villagers in his bathrobe with a rendition of "Deep in the Heart of Texas". He is in danger of court martial and reprimanded for misusing government supplies, selling liquor and "not turning the villagers into Americans fast enough". Col. Purdy orders the destruction of all the stills and the teahouse. Sakini and the villagers outsmart the colonel and only pretend to destroy everything, instead hiding everything "quick as the dickens". Their foresight proves fortuitous when Purdy learns that Congress is about to use Tobiki as a model for the success of Plan B. The villagers rebuild the teahouse on stage, and even offer a cup to Col. Purdy in a gesture of goodwill. Like all great comedies, in the end, all is forgiven. The village returns to the rich life they once knew (plus a teahouse, export industry, and geishas), Fisby is touted a hero, and Purdy, we hope will get a brigadier general's star for his wife Grace after all.

Set in the time-frame of the aftermath of World War II and U.S. occupation of the Japanese islands, Teahouse of the August Moon is a comedy whose laughs come from the inability of the American characters to understand Tobiki culture and tradition. However, it is not just a story of culture clash. Through the character of Fisby, we see acceptance and the beauty of making peace with oneself somewhere between ambition and limitations. We also learn, like Fisby, that sometimes the better life is had by taking a "step backward in the right direction".

== Productions ==
The Teahouse of the August Moon premiered on Broadway at the Martin Beck Theatre on October 15, 1953 and closed on March 24, 1956 after 1,027 performances. Directed by Robert Lewis, the cast featured John Forsythe (Capt. Fisby), David Wayne (Sakini), Paul Ford (Col. Wainright Purdy III), Larry Gates (Capt. McLean), William Hansen (Mr. Oshira), and Mariko Niki (Lotus Blossom). Hawaiian-American composer Dai-Keong Lee created incidental music for the production, and actor Yuki Shimoda is credited with choreographing and providing "Japanese coaching."

The two touring productions were headed by Burgess Meredith and Larry Parks in the role of Sakini and Reiko Sato in the role of Lotus Blossom. In April 1954, The Teahouse of the August Moon was produced in Okinawa as a fundraiser to build schools, with members of the U.S. occupying forces and citizens of Okinawa in the cast. The play was produced in Vienna and Berlin as Das Kleine Teehaus and in Mexico City as La Casa de Té de la Luna de Agosto, translated by Mexican playwright Rodolfo Usigli.

In July 1969, Ron Ely, the television Tarzan, starred in a production of Teahouse at the Little Theatre on the Square in Sullivan, Illinois.

New York's Pan Asian Rep revived Teahouse in 2000, directed by Ron Nakahara.

== Awards and nominations ==
Sources: PlaybillVault

- 1954 Tony Awards
  - Best Play—winner
  - Actor in a Play, David Wayne—winner
  - Author of a Play—winner
  - Producer of a Play—winner
  - Scenic Design of a Play, Peter Larkin—winner
- 1954 New York Drama Critics' Circle—Best American Play, winner
- 1954 Pulitzer Prize for Drama

== Adaptations ==
John Patrick adapted his play for the 1956 film The Teahouse of the August Moon, starring Marlon Brando, Glenn Ford, Eddie Albert and Machiko Kyo. The play and screenplay were adapted for the 1970 Broadway musical Lovely Ladies, Kind Gentlemen.
