= Vern Sneider =

American novelist

Vernon J. Sneider (6 October 1916 – 1 May 1981) was an American novelist. His 1951 novel The Teahouse of the August Moon was later adapted for a Broadway play in 1953, a motion picture in 1956, and the Broadway musical Lovely Ladies, Kind Gentlemen in 1970. John Patrick 's play The Teahouse of the August Moon won the Pulitzer Prize in Drama in 1954.

Sneider's novel A Pail of Oysters, about life during the White Terror under the Chinese Nationalists regime in Taiwan, was reissued by Camphor Press on February 28, 2016, the 69th anniversary of the 1947 2-28 Incident.

He was born and died in Monroe, Michigan. He was the son of Fred Sneider and Matilda D. Althaver Sneider. After graduating from the University of Notre Dame in 1940, he entered the Army. He was a member of a military government team that landed in Okinawa in April 1945. There he became commander of Tobaru, a village of 5,000 people that became Tobiki Village in The Teahouse. He was married first to Barbara Lee Cook (1925–1968).

== Bibliography ==
- Sneider, Vern (1951). The Teahouse of the August Moon. New York: Putnam. OCLC 429098.
- Sneider, Vern (1953). A Pail of Oysters. New York: Putnam. OCLC 1386251.
- Sneider, Vern (1956). A Long Way From Home, and Other Stories. New York: Putnam. OCLC 1563967.
- Sneider, Vern (1960). The King From Ashtabula. New York: Putnam. OCLC 1187398.
- Sneider, Vern (1971). West of the North Star. New York: Putnam. OCLC 257538.
