= United Kingdom in the Eurovision Song Contest 2004 =

- Eurovision Song Contest 2004
- Participating broadcaster: British Broadcasting Corporation (BBC)
- Country: United Kingdom
- Selection process: Eurovision: Making Your Mind Up 2004
- Selection date: 28 February 2004

Competing entry
- Song: "Hold Onto Our Love"
- Artist: James Fox
- Songwriters: Gary Miller; Tim Woodcock

Placement
- Final result: 16th, 29 points

Participation chronology

The United Kingdom was represented at the Eurovision Song Contest 2004 with the song "Hold Onto Our Love", written by Gary Miller and Tim Woodcock, and performed by James Fox. The British participating broadcaster, the British Broadcasting Corporation (BBC), organised a public selection process to determine its entry for the contest, Eurovision: Making Your Mind Up 2004. Six acts competed in the national final and the winner was selected entirely through a public vote.

As a member of the "Big Four", the United Kingdom automatically qualified to compete in the final of the Eurovision Song Contest. Performing in position 20, the United Kingdom placed 16th out of the 24 participating countries with 29 points.

== Background ==
Prior to the 2004 contest, the British Broadcasting Corporation (BBC) had participated in the Eurovision Song Contest representing the United Kingdom forty-six times. Thus far, it has won the contest five times: in 1967 with the song "Puppet on a String" performed by Sandie Shaw, in 1969 with the song "Boom Bang-a-Bang" performed by Lulu, in 1976 with "Save Your Kisses for Me" performed by Brotherhood of Man, in 1981 with the song "Making Your Mind Up" performed by Bucks Fizz, and in 1997 with the song "Love Shine a Light" performed by Katrina and the Waves. To this point, the nation is noted for having finished as the runner-up in a record fifteen contests. Up to and including 1998, it had only twice finished outside the top 10, in 1978 and in 1987. Since 1999, the year in which the rule was abandoned that songs must be performed in one of the official languages of the country participating, it has had less success, thus far only finishing within the top ten once: in 2002 with the song "Come Back" performed by Jessica Garlick. In 2003, "Cry Baby" performed by Jemini finished in twenty-sixth (last) place out of twenty-six competing entries.

As part of its duties as participating broadcaster, the BBC organises the selection of its entry in the Eurovision Song Contest and broadcasts the event in the country. The broadcaster announced that it would participate in the 2004 contest on 8 November 2003. BBC has traditionally organised a national final featuring a competition among several artists and songs to choose its entry for Eurovision. For its 2004 entry, the broadcaster announced that a new primetime national final involving a public vote would be held to select its entry, replacing the traditional A Song for Europe show more recently aired in a Sunday afternoon timeslot on BBC One.

== Before Eurovision ==
=== Eurovision: Making Your Mind Up 2004 ===
Eurovision: Making Your Mind Up 2004 was the national final developed by the BBC in order to select its entry for the Eurovision Song Contest 2004. Six acts competed in a televised show on 28 February 2004 held at the BBC Television Centre in London and hosted by Terry Wogan and Gaby Roslin. The winner was selected entirely through a public vote. The show was broadcast on BBC One. The national final was watched by 7.2 million viewers in the United Kingdom.

==== Competing entries ====
The BBC collaborated with record label Sony Music and an independent music expert to select five finalists to compete in the national final. Entries were provided to Sony Music and the BBC by music industry experts including writers and producers, and the songwriters behind the five selected songs were: Andy McCluskey and Stuart Kershaw (of OMD), Brian Higgins and Stuart McLennan, Brian Rawling, Gary Barlow and Pam Sheyne. A sixth finalist, "It Just Gets Better" performed by Madison Taylor, was provided by the British Academy of Songwriters, Composers and Authors (BASCA) which ran a songwriting competition amongst its members. The six artists were announced on 3 February 2004, while the competing songs were premiered during the BBC One television programme Top of the Pops, hosted by Tim Kash, on 13 February 2004.

==== Final ====
Six acts competed in the televised final on 28 February 2004. In addition to their performances, guest performers included previous Eurovision winner Sertab Erener, who won the contest for Turkey in 2003 with the song "Everyway That I Can", and Emma Bunton, performing her song "Maybe" and the winning song for the United Kingdom in 1967 "Puppet on a String".

A panel of experts provided feedback regarding the songs during the show. The panel consisted of Lorraine Kelly (journalist and television presenter), Harry Hill (comedian, writer, and television presenter) and Carrie Grant (member of Sweet Dreams who represented the United Kingdom in 1983, vocal coach and television presenter). A public vote consisting of televoting via phone and SMS as well as interactive voting via the red button, which registered more than 200,000 votes, selected the winner. Televotes via phone calls were divided into seven regions in the United Kingdom with each region awarding points as follows: 2, 4, 6, 8 and 12 points. Televotes via SMS were combined with the interactive votes and converted to points based on the percentage each song achieved. For example, if a song gained 10% of the SMS and interactive votes, then that entry would be awarded 10 points. The spokesperson announcing the SMS/interactive votes was Lorraine Kelly. After both sets of points were combined, "Hold Onto Our Love" performed by James Fox was the winner. "Hold Onto Our Love" received 45% of the total votes.

R/O	Artist	Song	Public vote			Place
R/O	Artist	Song	Phone	SMS and Interactive	Total	Place
1	Enrap-ture	"Weekend (Gotta Work)"	28	9	37	4
2	James Fox	"Hold Onto Our Love"	80	40	120	1
3	Haifa	"Me Without You"	4	5	9	6
4	Hyrise	"Leading Me On"	58	24	82	2
5	Haydon	"With You I Believe"	10	7	17	5
6	Madison Taylor	"It Just Gets Better"	44	15	59	3

Detailed Regional Televoting Results
R/O	Song	Northern Ireland	Northern England	Scotland	Wales	South West England	Midlands	South East England	Total
1	"Weekend (Gotta Work)"	4	4	4	4	4	4	4	28
2	"Hold Onto Our Love"	12	12	12	12	12	8	12	80
3	"Me Without You"					2	2		4
4	"Leading Me On"	8	8	8	6	8	12	8	58
5	"With You I Believe"	2	2	2	2			2	10
6	"It Just Gets Better"	6	6	6	8	6	6	6	44
Spokespersons
Northern Ireland – Malachi Cush; Northern England – Sonia; Scotland – Colin McAllister and Justin Ryan; Wales – Colin Jackson; South West England – Sharron Davies; Midlands – Hayley Evetts; South East England – Fearne Cotton

===== 12 points =====
N.	Song	Regions giving 12 points
6	"Hold Onto Our Love"	Northern England, Northern Ireland, Scotland, South West England, South East England, Wales
1	"Leading Me On"	Midlands

== At Eurovision ==
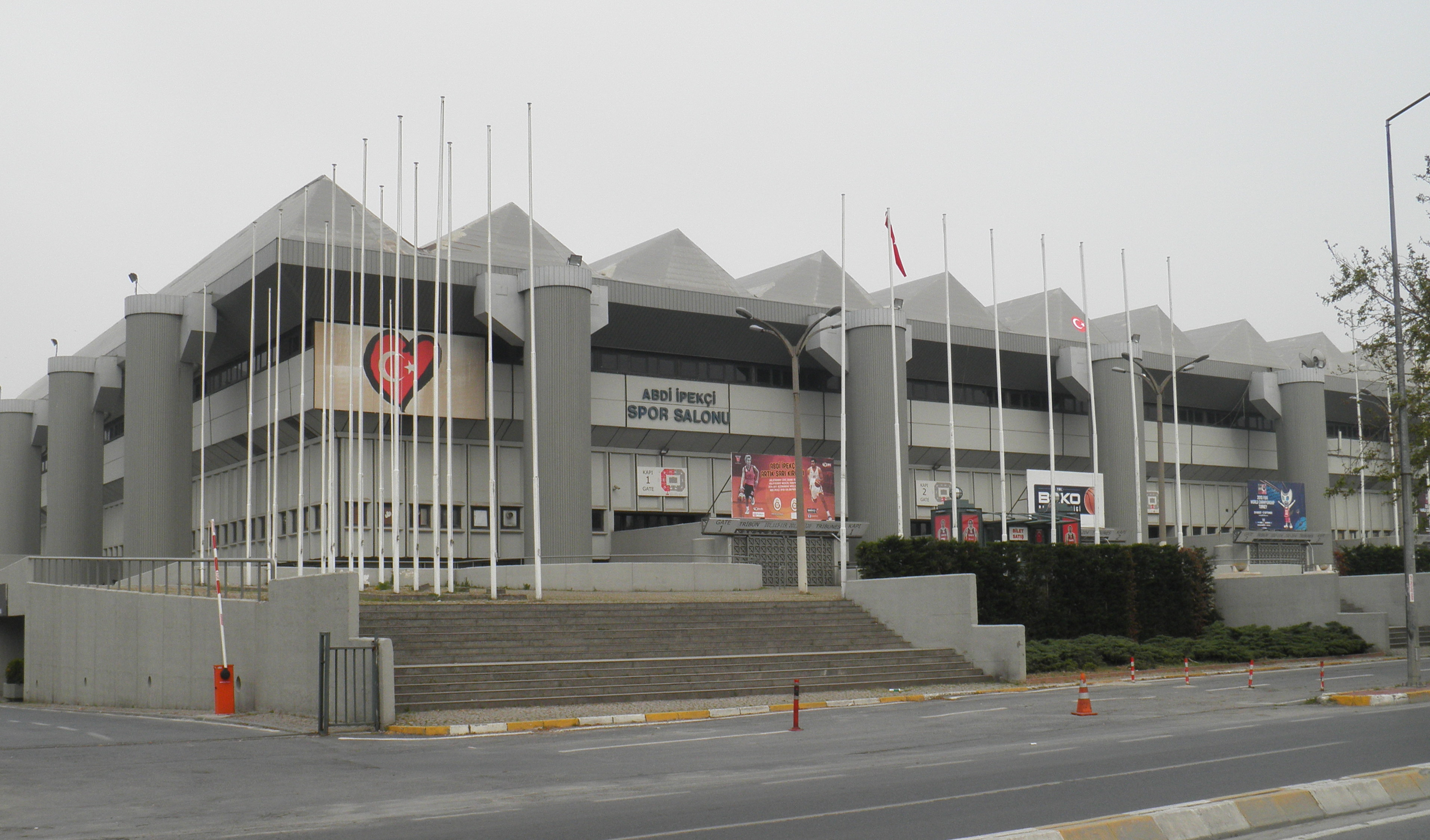
The Eurovision Song Contest 2004 took place at the Abdi İpekçi Arena in Istanbul, Turkey

It was announced that the competition's format would be expanded to include a semi-final in 2004. According to the rules, all nations with the exceptions of the host country, the "Big Four" (France, Germany, Spain, and the United Kingdom) and the ten highest placed finishers in the 2003 contest are required to qualify from the semi-final in order to compete for the final; the top ten countries from the semi-final progress to the final. As a member of the "Big Four", the United Kingdom automatically qualified to compete in the final on 15 May 2004. In addition to their participation in the final, the United Kingdom also broadcast and voted in the semi-final on 12 May 2004. During the running order draw for the semi-final and final, the United Kingdom was placed to perform in position 20 in the final, following the entry from Poland and before the entry from Cyprus. The United Kingdom placed sixteenth in the final, scoring 29 points.

In the United Kingdom, the semi-final was broadcast on BBC Three with commentary by Paddy O'Connell, while the final was televised on BBC One with commentary by Terry Wogan and broadcast on BBC Radio 2 with commentary by Ken Bruce. The BBC appointed Lorraine Kelly as its spokesperson to announce the results of the British televote during the final.

=== Voting ===
Below is a breakdown of points awarded to the United Kingdom and awarded by the United Kingdom in the semi-final and grand final of the contest. The nation awarded its 12 points to Greece in the semi-final and the final of the contest. Following the release of the televoting figures by the EBU after the conclusion of the competition, it was revealed that a total of 451,996 televotes were cast in the United Kingdom during the two shows: 415,558 votes in the final and 36,438 votes in the semi-final.

==== Points awarded to the United Kingdom ====
Points awarded to the United Kingdom (Final)
Score	Country
12 points	
10 points	
8 points	Ireland
7 points	
6 points	
5 points	
4 points	Estonia; Malta
3 points	Latvia
2 points	Iceland; Poland; Romania; Sweden
1 point	Belarus; Russia

==== Points awarded by the United Kingdom ====
Points awarded by the United Kingdom (Semi-final)
Score	Country
12 points	Greece
10 points	Cyprus
8 points	Serbia and Montenegro
7 points	Ukraine
6 points	Albania
5 points	Malta
4 points	Bosnia and Herzegovina
3 points	Netherlands
2 points	Israel
1 point	Estonia

Points awarded by the United Kingdom (Final)
Score	Country
12 points	Greece
10 points	Cyprus
8 points	Sweden
7 points	Ireland
6 points	Turkey
5 points	Ukraine
4 points	Germany
3 points	Serbia and Montenegro
2 points	Malta
1 point	Albania
