= Hold Onto Our Love =

2004 single by James Fox

Single by James Fox
- Released: 19 April 2004
- Recorded: 2003
- Genre: Pop
- Label: Sony
- Songwriters: Gary Miller, Tim Woodcock

James Fox singles chronology
"Hold Onto Our Love" (2004)	"Bluebirds Flying High" (2008)

Eurovision Song Contest 2004 entry
- Country: United Kingdom
- Artist: James Fox
- Language: English
- Composer: Gary Miller
- Lyricist: Tim Woodcock

Finals performance
- Final result: 16th
- Final points: 29

Entry chronology
- ◄ "Cry Baby" (2003)
- "Touch My Fire" (2005) ►

"Hold Onto Our Love" is a single by Welsh singer James Fox, who was best known for his appearance as a contestant on the second series of the talent show Fame Academy in 2003. It was the Eurovision Song Contest 2004 entry for the United Kingdom.

== At Eurovision ==
Despite the United Kingdom's 26th place at the 2003 contest, the song was pre-qualified for the final as the United Kingdom was one of the "Big Four" (along with Spain, Germany and France), which means that its entries were exempt from qualification in the semi-final.

The song was performed 20th on the night, following Poland's Blue Café with "Love Song" and preceding Cyprus' Lisa Andreas with "Stronger Every Minute". At the close of voting, it had received 29 points, placing 16th in a field of 24.

== Charts ==
Chart (2004)	Peak position
UK Singles Official Charts Company	13
