= 2008 FA Cup final =

English association football match

2008 FA Cup Final
- Event: 2007–08 FA Cup
Cardiff City	Portsmouth
(Wales)	(England)
0	1
- Date: 17 May 2008
- Venue: Wembley Stadium, London
- Man of the Match: Nwankwo Kanu (Portsmouth)
- Referee: Mike Dean (Cheshire)
- Attendance: 89,874

The 2008 FA Cup final was an association football match between Cardiff City and Portsmouth held at Wembley Stadium, London, on 17 May 2008. The final was the showpiece match of English football's primary cup competition, the 2007–08 Football Association Challenge Cup (FA Cup), organised by The Football Association. It was the 127th FA Cup Final and the second to be held at the new Wembley Stadium following its redevelopment. Portsmouth won the match by a single goal, scored by Nwankwo Kanu in the 37th minute.

Both sides had entered the competition in the third round and progressed to the final by winning five matches. Portsmouth conceded only one goal en route to the final, during a 2–1 victory over Plymouth Argyle in the fourth round. All of their remaining fixtures were won by the same 1–0 scoreline. Cardiff began their campaign by defeating the lowest-ranked side ever to reach the third round, Chasetown, 3–1. After a 2–1 victory over Hereford United in the following round, Cardiff did not concede another goal during their progression to the final. The final was the first time the two sides had ever met in the competition. Both teams were aiming to win the FA Cup for the second time, Cardiff having won it in 1927 and Portsmouth in 1939. Cardiff were also aiming to become the first side from outside the top tier of English football to win the competition since 1980.

The match was played in front of 89,874 spectators, which remains the highest attendance for a football match at the new Wembley Stadium. Cardiff started brightly and had several early opportunities that were denied by Portsmouth goalkeeper David James. For Portsmouth, lone striker Nwankwo Kanu nearly opened the scoring by hitting the post before converting a later chance, after the ball had been spilled by Cardiff goalkeeper Peter Enckelman, to lead at half time. Cardiff were denied an equalising goal late in the half when Glenn Loovens' effort was disallowed for handball. In the second half, Portsmouth focused on defending their lead and, although Cardiff pressured for long periods, they were unable to create many clear chances. Portsmouth maintained their 1–0 advantage until the final whistle to claim victory.

For winning the competition, Portsmouth received £1 million in prize money, as well as qualification to the 2008–09 UEFA Cup – their first foray into European football. Portsmouth reached the final again two years later, suffering a defeat to Chelsea.

This was Portsmouth's latest cup triumph for more than a decade when they beat Sunderland on Penalties to win the 2019 EFL Trophy Final.

== Route to the final ==
The FA Cup is English football's primary cup competition and the 2007–08 season was the 127th edition. Clubs in the first and second tiers, the Premier League and Football League Championship, entered the competition in the third round and were drawn randomly with the remaining clubs. If a match is drawn, a replay comes into force, ordinarily at the ground of the team who were away for the first game. As with league fixtures, FA Cup matches are subject to change in the event of games being selected for television coverage and this often can be influenced by clashes with other competitions.

=== Cardiff City ===
Round	Opposition	Score
3rd	Chasetown (a)	3–1
4th	Hereford United (a)	2–1
5th	Wolverhampton Wanderers (h)	2–0
6th	Middlesbrough (a)	2–0
Semi-final	Barnsley (n)	1–0
Key: (h) = home venue; (a) = away venue; (n) = neutral venue

Cardiff City entered the competition in the third round, receiving a bye as a Football League Championship club. They were drawn against Southern League Division One Midlands side Chasetown, who had become the lowest-ranked side ever to reach the third round of the competition after defeating Port Vale in the second round. The difference in league positions between the two sides was also the largest in the tournament's history. Cardiff were given an early scare as an own goal by defender Kevin McNaughton, from a cross by Ben Steane, gave Chasetown the lead in the 17th minute. Midfielder Peter Whittingham scored a first half injury time equaliser for Cardiff. Teenager Aaron Ramsey, making his first appearance in an FA Cup match, put Cardiff ahead with a close-range header and winger Paul Parry hit the ball through Chasetown goalkeeper Lee Evans' legs to ensure progression to the fourth round. Cardiff were drawn away to League Two side Hereford United at Edgar Street. McNaughton opened the scoring with his first goal for Cardiff striking a volley from the edge of the Hereford penalty area during first-half injury time. They extended their lead when striker Steven Thompson converted a penalty after McNaughton was felled by Clint Easton. Hereford scored in the 77th minute through striker Theo Robinson, but they were unable to score an equaliser and Cardiff won the match 2–1 to go through to the fifth round. This was the first time since 1994 that Cardiff had progressed to the fifth round of the FA Cup.

Cardiff's fifth round match was at their home ground, Ninian Park, against fellow Championship side Wolverhampton Wanderers. Whittingham opened the scoring for Cardiff after 90 seconds as he collected a flick-on from Jimmy Floyd Hasselbaink before shooting past opposition goalkeeper Wayne Hennessey. Hasselbaink extended Cardiff's advantage nine minutes later by striking the ball into the top-left hand corner of the opposition goal. Wolves were unable to respond in the remainder of the match, their best opportunity fell to centre forward Kevin Kyle who took advantage of a mistake by centre-back Glenn Loovens early in the second half, only for Loovens to clear the ball off the goalline. The victory was the furthest Cardiff had advanced in the FA Cup since their victory in the 1927 final.

In the sixth round, Cardiff were drawn away to Premier League side Middlesbrough at the Riverside Stadium. An early goal by Whittingham and a second by defender Roger Johnson from a Whittingham free-kick in the 23rd minute was enough to take Cardiff into the semi-finals. In the semi-final, Cardiff were drawn against Championship side Barnsley, with both semi-finals being held at Wembley Stadium. This was the first time since 1908 that three of the four semi-finalists came from outside the top tier of English football, while winning the match was worth £900,000 in prize money. With Cardiff applying early pressure, nine minutes into the game, the ball was cleared from the Barnsley penalty area toward midfielder Joe Ledley, who scored the winning goal with a left-footed volley from outside the area to help Cardiff reach their first FA Cup final since 1927.

=== Portsmouth ===
Round	Opposition	Score
3rd	Ipswich Town (a)	1–0
4th	Plymouth Argyle (h)	2–1
5th	Preston North End (a)	1–0
6th	Manchester United (a)	1–0
Semi-final	West Bromwich Albion (n)	1–0
Key: (h) = home venue; (a) = away venue; (n) = neutral venue

Like Cardiff, but as a Premier League club, Portsmouth also received a bye into the third round. Their opening match was a 1–0 away win against Championship side Ipswich Town at Portman Road on 4 January 2008. Striker David Nugent, who started the match as a substitute, scored the winning goal in the 51st minute, allowing Portsmouth to progress into the next round. There, they were drawn against another Championship club, Plymouth Argyle. The match was held at Portsmouth's home ground, Fratton Park, and the visitors took the lead early in the first half when midfielder Chris Clark scored his first goal for Plymouth, which came from a deflection off Hermann Hreiðarsson. Portsmouth responded with their recently signed midfielder Lassana Diarra converting a corner kick from Pedro Mendes in the 34th minute. A goal by Niko Kranjčar from an eight-yard pass from right back Glen Johnson gave Portsmouth a 2–1 victory and progression to the next round of the FA Cup.

The club faced Preston North End away at Deepdale in the fifth round. The only goal of the game came in the final seconds of the match, as Preston midfielder Darren Carter attempted to clear a corner kick from Kranjčar but struck the ball into his own net. In the sixth round, Portsmouth were drawn away to fellow Premier League club Manchester United at Old Trafford. Portsmouth took a 1–0 victory after midfielder Sulley Muntari converted a penalty following a foul by United goalkeeper Tomasz Kuszczak on Milan Baroš which prompted Kuszczak's dismissal, with the referee showing him a red card. Championship side West Bromwich Albion were the opposition in the semi-final, which was also held at the neutral Wembley Stadium, on 5 April 2008. Striker Nwankwo Kanu side-footed the winning goal of the match, which meant Portsmouth had secured a place in the final for the first time since 1939.

== Background ==
The 2008 final was the first time since 1995 that the competition would be won by a team other than the "big four" of English football, Manchester United, Arsenal, Liverpool and Chelsea. It was also the first final not to feature one of the four sides since 1991. Cardiff were appearing in their third FA Cup final, having lost to Sheffield United in the 1925 final before becoming the only team from outside England to win the competition in 1927 by defeating Arsenal. Portsmouth were appearing in their fourth final; they had suffered defeat in both the 1929 and 1934 finals before becoming the last team to win the competition before World War II in 1939. This was the first time that the two sides had met in the competition, while they had not met in any fixture since a 2–0 win for Portsmouth in the fourth round of the League Cup in 2004. If Cardiff won the match, they would become the first club from outside the top division of English football to have won the competition since West Ham United in 1980. The final was the second to be held at the newly redeveloped Wembley Stadium.

The winner of the match would receive £1 million in prize money and qualify for the 2008–09 UEFA Cup. It was suggested before the game that Cardiff would not have been allowed to compete in the UEFA Cup had they won. Although playing in the English Football League, Cardiff are members of the Football Association of Wales and Football Association (FA) regulations previously meant Welsh clubs were ineligible for European competitions even if they won the FA Cup or League Cup. This prompted UEFA to offer the possibility of Cardiff filling a wild-card slot in the UEFA Cup. The FA later issued a statement saying they would give their permission for Cardiff to participate in the UEFA Cup as one of England's representatives in the competition should the need arise. As in preceding years, the players voted Player of the Round in every round, from the first qualifying round to the semi-finals, were present and given VIP hospitality for themselves and a guest.

=== Pre-match ===
Cardiff had two major injury concerns ahead of the match. Veteran striker Robbie Fowler was given 10 days to prove his fitness by manager Dave Jones, having not played in four months since undergoing hip surgery. The final decision over Fowler was not revealed until Jones announced his side around 90 minutes before the match, in which the forward was omitted from the matchday squad. The other injury concern, Parry, was named in the starting line-up. He had played 70 minutes in the club's final league match against Barnsley having not played for seven weeks beforehand. Jimmy Floyd Hasselbaink started in attack, supported by Parry. Ramsey was named on the bench to start the match. At 17 years and 143 days, he would become the second-youngest player to appear in an FA Cup Final if he played, only 24 days older than Curtis Weston was for Millwall in 2004, and the youngest ever winner if Cardiff triumphed.

Singer and Cardiff fan James Fox recorded a song for the occasion, which was released as the club's official FA Cup single. The song, entitled "Bluebirds Flying High", was released on 5 May, reaching number 15 in the UK Singles Chart in its first week of release. Cardiff player Thompson also recorded a song for the final, entitled "Do the Ayatollah", that was written by himself and his teammates.

Jermain Defoe was cup-tied for Portsmouth, having played in the third and fourth rounds for Tottenham Hotspur earlier in the competition. Consequently, Kanu was chosen ahead of Baros and Nugent as a lone striker in a 4–1–4–1 formation, with support from a five-man midfield of Kranjčar, John Utaka, Mendes, Diarra and Muntari. Sol Campbell, Glen Johnson and David James were the only three English players in the starting line-up. James had recovered from injury in time to be named in the squad, along with forward David Nugent, having missed the club's previous three games.

The FA announced that, before the game, the Welsh anthem, "Hen Wlad Fy Nhadau", would be played, along with the traditional renditions of the National anthem "God Save the Queen" and "Abide with Me". The Welsh anthem was sung by Katherine Jenkins, while Lesley Garrett sang "God Save the Queen" and the two duetted on "Abide with Me". However both anthems were booed by the respective opposing fans. The referee appointed for the game was Mike Dean of the Cheshire Football Association. He received a fee of £525 for taking charge of the fixture and a souvenir medal from the FA. Referees are traditionally only appointed to one FA Cup final in their careers and Dean had previously been selected for the 2006 FA Cup Final before being stood down when Liverpool reached the final, with Dean hailing from the nearby Wirral. His assistants for the match were Trevor Massey (Manchester) and Martin Yerby (Kent) while Chris Foy (Liverpool) was named as the fourth official.

Both sides received 25,000 tickets for the final, 8,000 less than they had been given for their respective semi-final matches. A significant portion of tickets were kept by The FA for its members. Portsmouth won a coin toss to determine the choice of kit colours and chose to wear their blue home kit, leaving Cardiff in their black away kit. Portsmouth were considered clear favourites ahead of the match. They had been given odds of 16–1 to win the competition when they entered in the third round, but were now odds-on favourites at 1–3. Cardiff had been given odds as high as 999–1 when they entered the competition; they entered the final at 5–2.

== Match summary ==
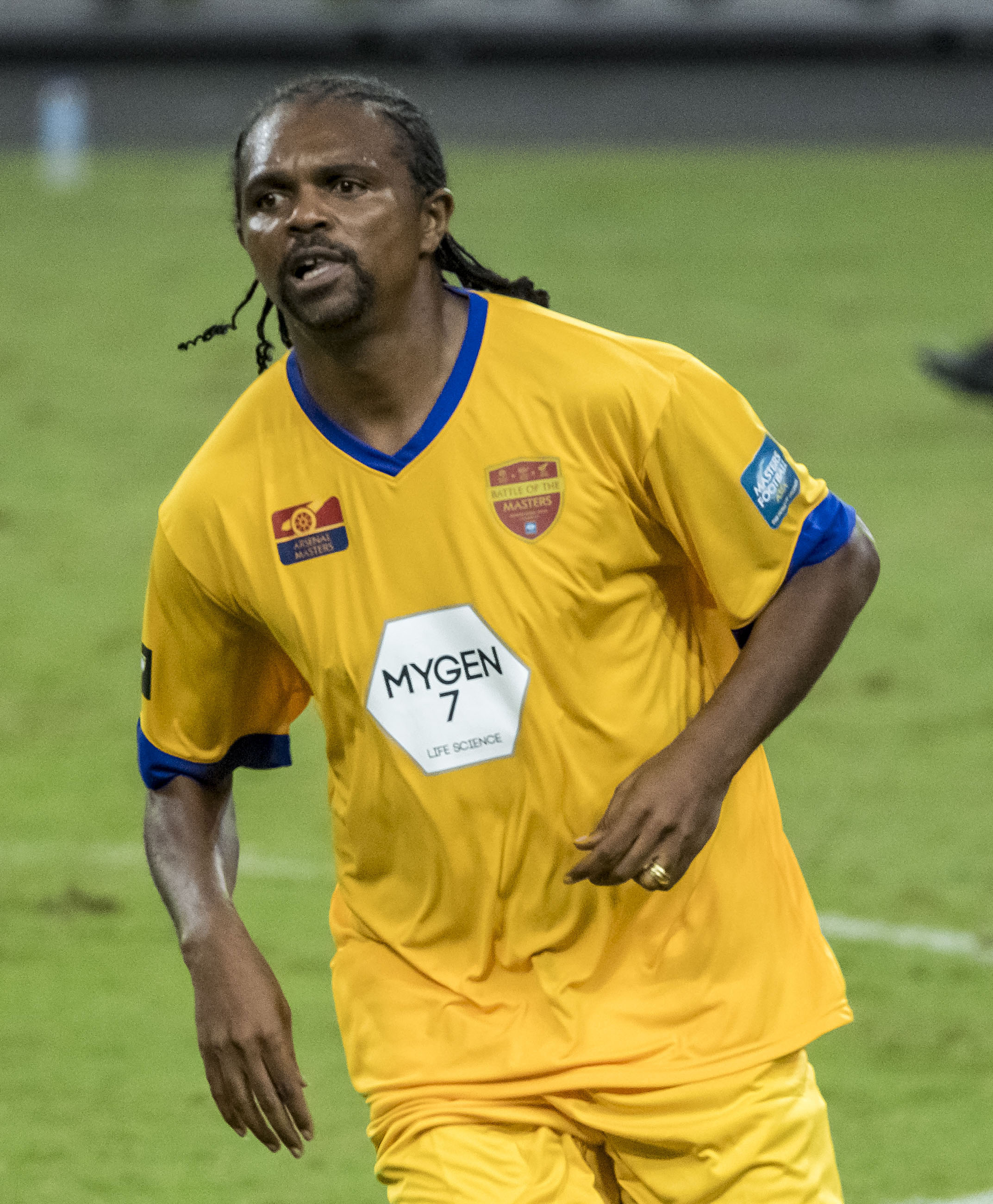
Portsmouth forward Nwankwo Kanu (pictured in 2017) scored the only goal of the game and was named man of the match.

The match kicked-off at 3pm in front of 89,874 spectators, the record attendance for a football match at the new Wembley Stadium. In the first minute, Parry chased a long pass forward but was narrowly beaten to the ball by James. The first shot of the game was from Muntari, but his long-range free-kick was comfortably stopped by Cardiff goalkeeper Peter Enckelman. Cardiff had a similar chance to their first moments later as Ledley played in Parry who broke through the opposition defence and advanced towards goal before James was able to push the ball away at his feet. The Welsh side attacked frequently in the opening 15 minutes with both Parry and McNaughton having attempts on goal. The BBC's Chris Bevan noted that Cardiff had enjoyed "a decent start ... and they certainly don't look nervous". However, moments later, Portsmouth nearly took the lead when Utaka's cross found Kanu in the penalty area. He managed to evade both a defender and the opposition goalkeeper before hitting the outside of the post from a narrow angle.

The two teams traded off-target attempts at goal midway through the half, both Parry and Roger Johnson failed to hit the target after the ball was played in from a set-piece. For Portsmouth, Kanu shot from long range, but his shot went well over the crossbar, and Enckelman was forced to punch the ball clear from Glen Johnson's cross. Portsmouth opened the scoring in the 39th minute when Utaka crossed the ball close to the goal line from the right. Enckelman palmed the ball away but only to the feet of Kanu who was able to scoop the ball into the net to give his side the lead. Cardiff rallied quickly in an attempt to equalise and McNaughton narrowly failed to connect with Parry's cross shortly after. Loovens was also able to force the ball into the goal from a corner minutes before half-time, but his effort was ruled out for handball.

The second half began more sedately and the first major chance of the half came after ten minutes when Roger Johnson's header hit the side netting. Portsmouth responded quickly as Utaka broke free of the defence and played in Kanu, but his shot was deflected wide by Loovens for a corner. Cardiff made the first substitution of the match shortly after an hour as Ramsey was brought on in place of Whittingham. Portsmouth followed suit soon after as Utaka was replaced by Nugent having sustained an injury minutes earlier. Cardiff made a second change ten minutes later as Thompson replaced Hasselbaink, but they struggled to create further opportunities until Loovens again caused problems from a corner. He was able to connect with a diving header but hit his attempt into the ground and the ball bounced over the opposition goal. Bevan noted that Cardiff were "visibly tiring" and Portsmouth's defence had largely contained their attacking threat. Although, Cardiff pressured as the game drew to a close, they struggled to create any clear opportunities and the game ended in a 1–0 victory for Portsmouth.

=== Details ===
17 May 2008
15:00 BST

Cardiff City (Wales)	0–1	(England) Portsmouth
	Report	Kanu 37'

Wembley Stadium, London
Attendance: 89,874
Referee: Mike Dean (Cheshire)

Cardiff City	Portsmouth

GK	1	(Finland) Peter Enckelman
RB	2	(Scotland) Kevin McNaughton
CB	12	(England) Roger Johnson
CB	6	(Netherlands) Glenn Loovens
LB	3	(Northern Ireland) Tony Capaldi
LM	7	(England) Peter Whittingham	(substituted off) 61'
CM	10	(Republic of Ireland) Stephen McPhail (c)
CM	4	(Scotland) Gavin Rae	(substituted off) 86'
RM	16	(Wales) Joe Ledley
CF	11	(Wales) Paul Parry
CF	36	(Netherlands) Jimmy Floyd Hasselbaink	(substituted off) 70'
Substitutes:
GK	13	(England) Michael Oakes
DF	5	(England) Darren Purse
MF	18	(England) Trevor Sinclair	(substituted on) 86'
MF	30	(Wales) Aaron Ramsey	(substituted on) 61'
FW	20	(Scotland) Steven Thompson	(substituted on) 70'
Manager:
(England) Dave Jones

GK	1	(England) David James
RB	5	(England) Glen Johnson
CB	23	(England) Sol Campbell (c)
CB	15	(France) Sylvain Distin
LB	7	(Iceland) Hermann Hreiðarsson	(yellow card) 45+1'
DM	6	(France) Lassana Diarra	(yellow card) 90+3'
RM	17	(Nigeria) John Utaka		(substituted off) 69'
CM	30	(Portugal) Pedro Mendes		(substituted off) 78'
CM	19	(Croatia) Niko Kranjčar	(yellow card) 54'
LM	11	(Ghana) Sulley Muntari
CF	27	(Nigeria) Nwankwo Kanu		(substituted off) 87'
Substitutes:
GK	21	(England) Jamie Ashdown
DF	16	(France) Noé Pamarot
MF	8	(Senegal) Papa Bouba Diop		(substituted on) 78'
FW	9	(Czech Republic) Milan Baroš		(substituted on) 87'
FW	10	(England) David Nugent		(substituted on) 69'
Manager:
(England) Harry Redknapp

Man of the match

- Nwankwo Kanu (Portsmouth)

Match officials

- Assistant referees:
  - Trevor Massey (Cheshire)
  - Martin Yerby (Kent)
- Fourth official: Chris Foy (Liverpool)

Match rules

- 90 minutes
- 30 minutes of extra-time if necessary
- Penalty shoot-out if scores still level
- Five named substitutes
- Maximum of three substitutions

=== Statistics ===
Match statistics
	Cardiff	Portsmouth
Total shots	8	9
Shots on target	1	3
Ball possession	48%	52%
Corner kicks	7	6
Fouls committed	11	26
Offsides	1	2
Yellow cards	0	3
Red cards	0	0

== Post-match ==
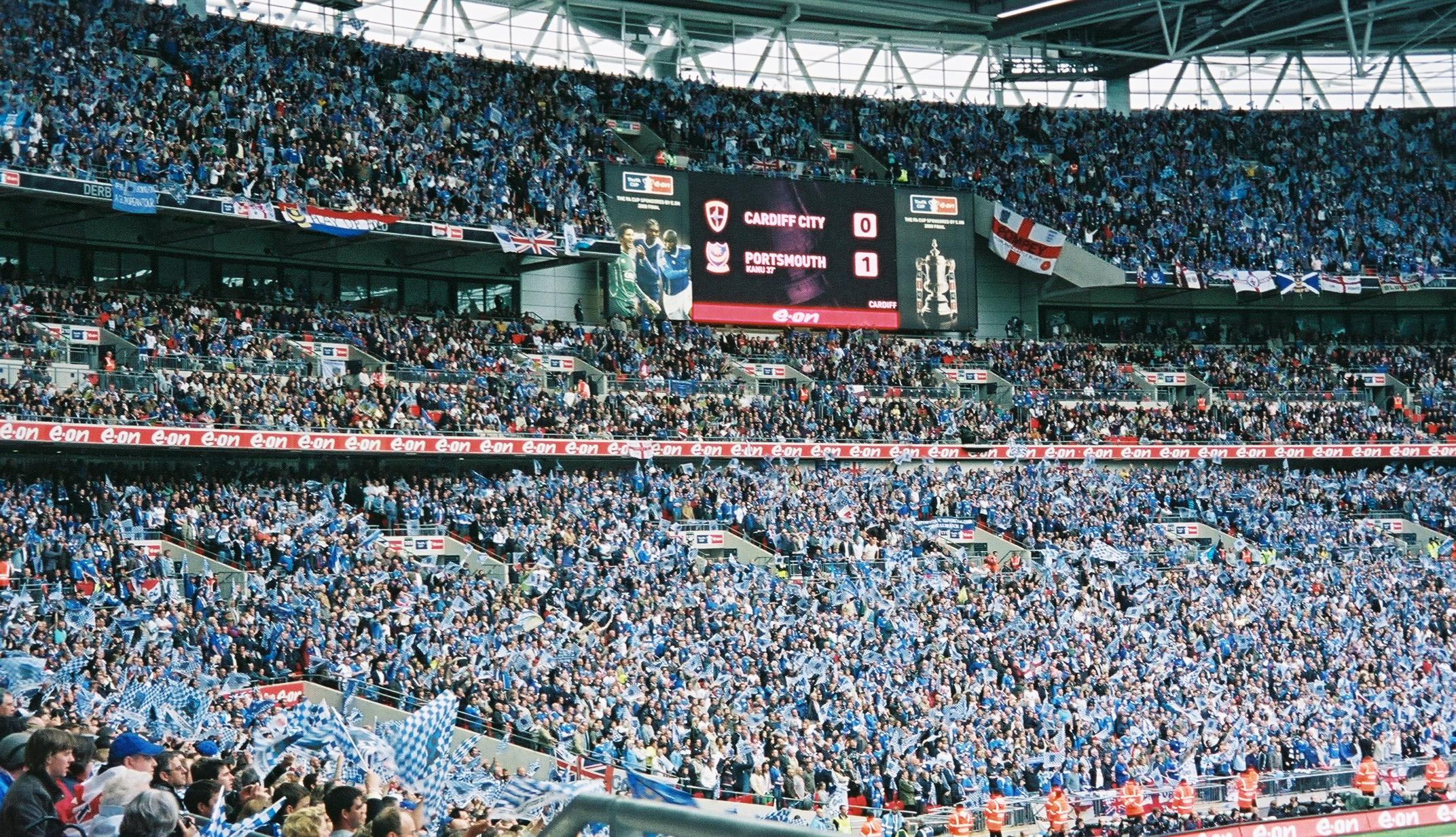
The Wembley scoreboard at the final whistle.

After the match, Portsmouth captain Campbell was presented with the trophy by Bobby Robson. Kanu, the scorer of the winning goal, was named man of the match and described the win as the "best moment of my life", while the victory was the first major trophy that manager Harry Redknapp had won during his 25-year managerial career. He described it as "dream come true to win the FA Cup. It has been a good day." The Portsmouth team attended a victory parade in their home city the following day that was attended by around 200,000 people. As winners, Portsmouth also qualified for the 2008 FA Community Shield against Premier League winners Manchester United in August. The two sides played out a goalless draw before United won the tie in a penalty shootout.

Of the 16 players in Portsmouth's matchday squad, the final was the last match for two, Muntari and Baros, while Mendes appeared in the Community Shield before being sold to Rangers. Redknapp also left the club three months into the new season, taking charge of Tottenham Hotspur. Portsmouth reached the final again in 2010 under Avram Grant, losing 1–0 to Chelsea.

Jones was pragmatic about his side's defeat, stating "we gave it everything we had and that's all I asked for". Enckelman later recalled his error that lead to the only goal "It was a tough one to deal with, it was wet conditions and the ball just started dropping down, maybe I could have tried to catch it or something but I didn't deal with it well enough." Despite their defeat, a return party was held for the Cardiff team at Roald Dahl Plass in Cardiff Bay in which both Thompson and Fox performed their FA Cup final songs. Several players involved in the match for Cardiff left the club prior to the new season, with veteran trio Hasselbaink and Sinclair retiring and Fowler joining Blackburn Rovers. Loovens, Ramsey and Thompson were also sold during the summer.

The 2008 final led the FA and the Football League to largely ban the playing of anthems in future matches between English and Welsh sides after jeering from both sets of supporters. The 89,874 attendance for the match remains the largest for a football match at the redeveloped Wembley Stadium since its construction.
