= Łzy =

Band

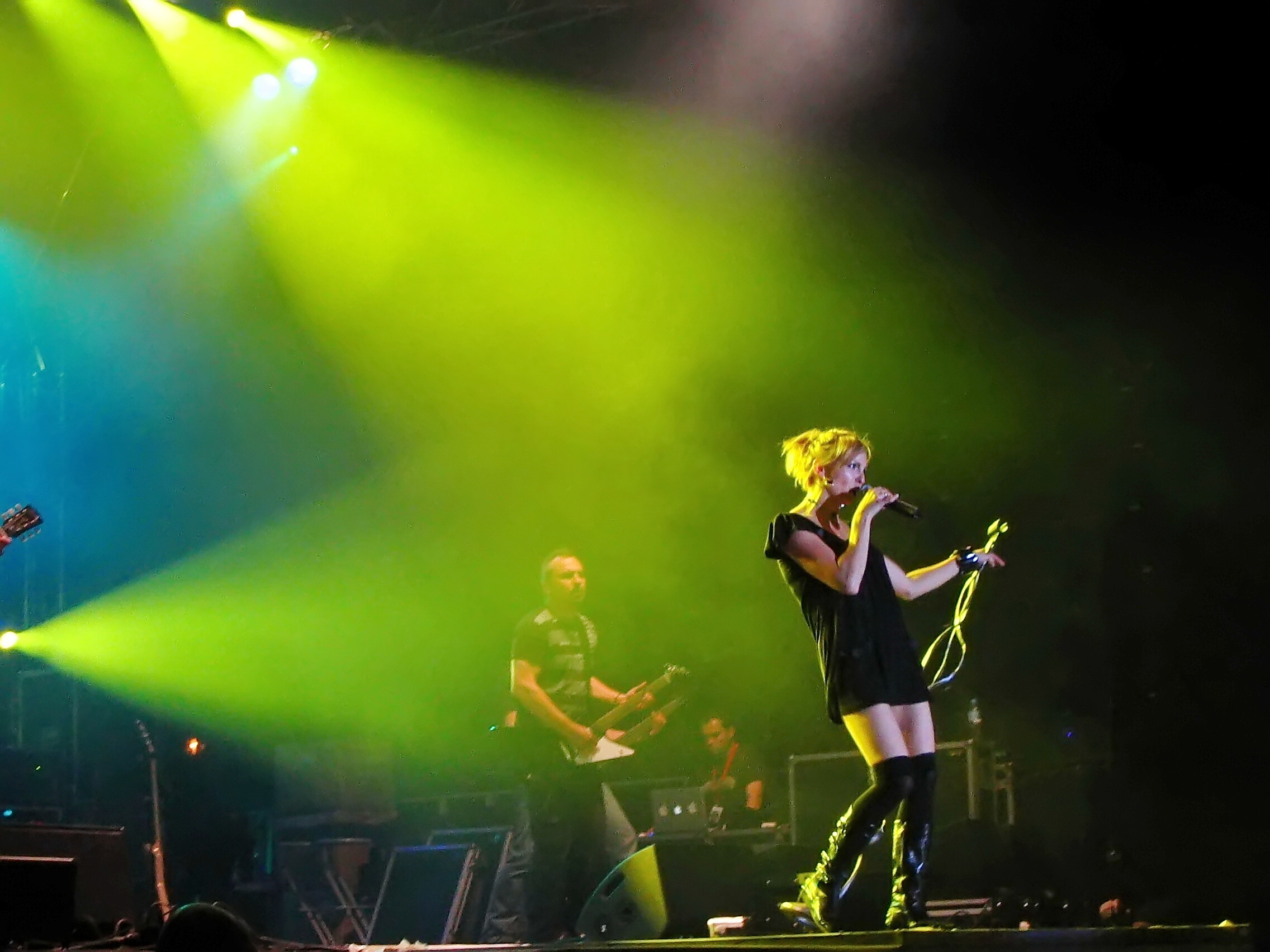
- Łzy at a concert in Dąbrowa Górnicza, 2008

Background information
- Origin: Pszów, Poland
- Genres: Pop rock
- Years active: 1996–present
- Labels: EMI Music Poland, Metal Mind Productions, Universal Music Poland, Warner Music Poland
- Members: Adam Konkol; Arkadiusz Dzierżawa; Dawid Krzykała; Adrian Wieczorek; Rafał Trzaskalik; Sara Chmiel
- Past members: Anna Wyszkoni; Sławomir Mocarski
- Website: www.lzyofficial.pl

Łzy (pronounced [wzɨ]; Polish for "Tears") are a Polish pop rock band formed in 1996, best known for their early 2000s hits "Agnieszka już dawno...", "Narcyz się nazywam", "Jestem jaka jestem" and "Oczy szeroko zamknięte", among others. The group has released one gold and three platinum certified albums in Poland. Up until 2010, the band's lead vocalist was Anna Wyszkoni who continued a successful solo career. Łzy are known for their sad, melancholic lyrics, exploring loneliness, unhappy love and heartbreak, occasionally touching on controversial subjects, such as suicide, rape, abortion, euthanasia and drugs.

== History ==
=== 1990s: Formation and early career ===
The band was formed on the initiative of Adam Konkol in 1996 in Pszów, southern Poland, with all its members originating from Racibórz and Wodzisław Śląski counties. The group released a demo album later that year and debuted with a full-length, self-released album Słońce (Sun) in December 1998. The album passed unnoticed although Łzy toured consequently and grew local fanbase. The band was briefly signed to Warner Music Poland who released the single "Aniele mój" in 1999.

=== 2000s: Breakthrough and commercial peak ===
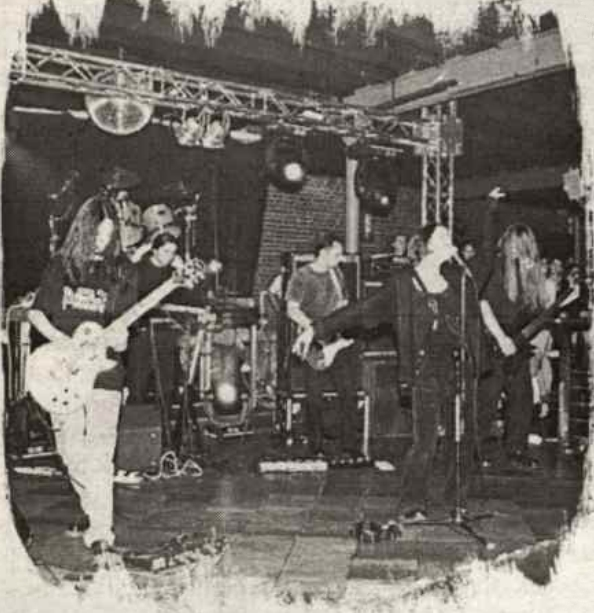
Łzy at a concert in Prudnik, 2001

Łzy self-released their second album W związku z samotnością (In a Relationship with Loneliness) in July 2000, but it wasn't until 2001 that the hit singles "Agnieszka już dawno..." and "Narcyz się nazywam" brought the band popularity in Poland. Re-released by Pomaton EMI, W związku z samotnością peaked at number 4 in the Polish albums chart and was eventually certified platinum by ZPAV, having sold in over 125,000 copies. The album spawned two more moderately popular singles, "Opowiem wam jej historię" and "Niebieska sukienka". Pomaton EMI also re-released Słońce which entered the sales chart at number 46. In spring 2002, the band recorded their third album, Jesteś jaki jesteś (You Are the Way You Are), released in May 2002, which leaned towards heavier guitar-led sound. The first single, "Jestem jaka jestem", was premiered at the National Festival of Polish Song in Opole and met with popularity in Poland. The album reached number 4 in the sales chart and was certified gold, supported by further popular singles "Ja nie lubię nikogo" and "Anastazja, jestem", the latter taking on the subject of euthanasia and accompanied by a music video starring Alicja Bachleda-Curuś, a popular Polish actress. Despite their commercial success, Polish media were reluctant to promote Łzy's music and the group received little television coverage or radio air time.

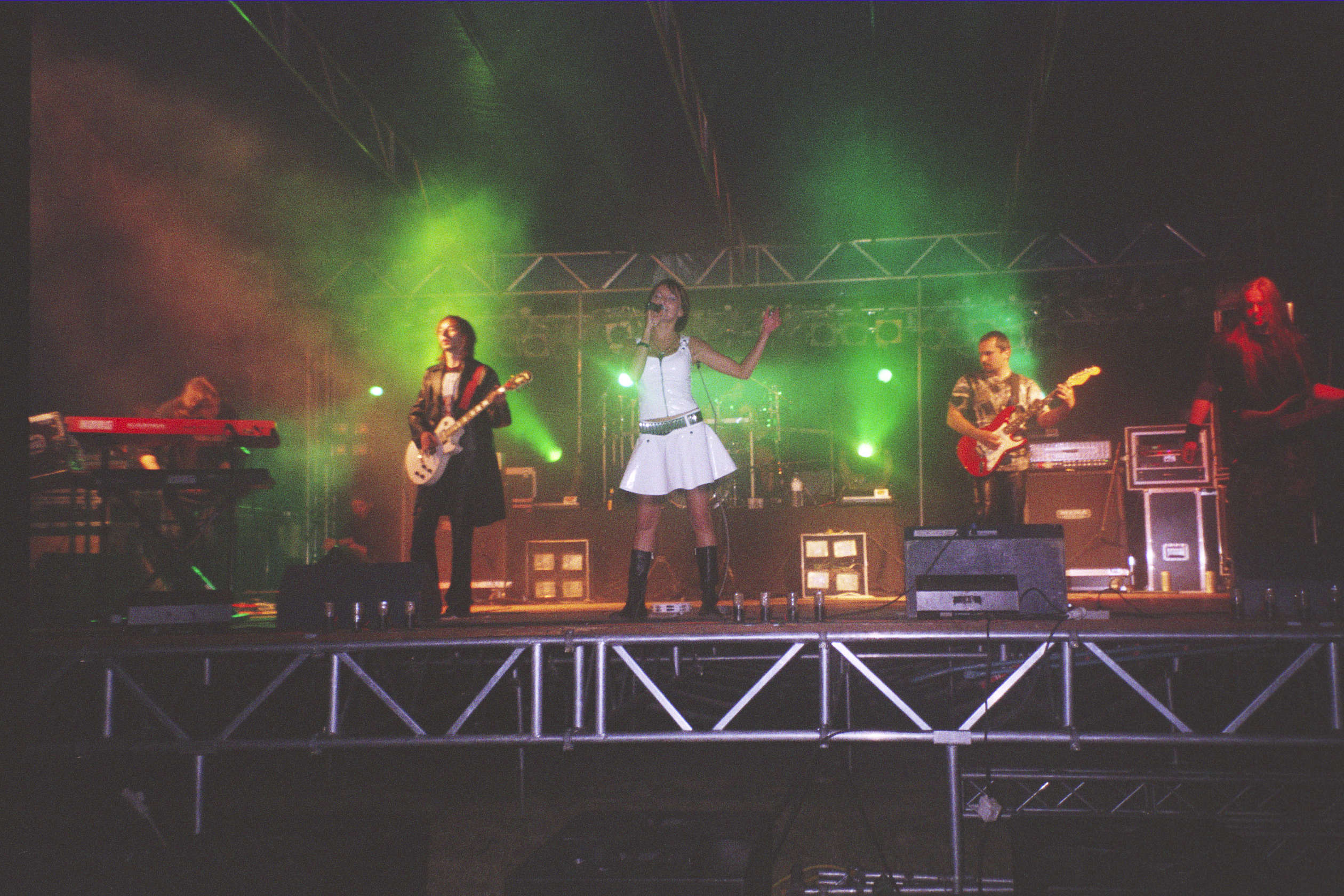
Łzy at a concert in Poznań, 2005

In early 2003, Łzy started recording material for their fourth album. The lead single, "Oczy szeroko zamknięte", was presented at the Opole Festival where it was selected as the winner by the audience in a voting contest. The song went on to become their most commercially successful single yet, reaching number 1 in the Polish airplay chart. The song's popularity brought the band nationwide recognition and attention from the mainstream media. The album Nie czekaj na jutro (Don't Wait for Tomorrow), released in June 2003, reached number 1 in the sales chart where it remained in the top 3 for 10 consecutive weeks. It was certified platinum later in 2003 and sold around 75,000 copies. Further singles from the album were "Anka, ot tak" and "Trochę wspomnień, tamtych dni" which were only moderately successful. In 2004 Łzy recorded the song "Julia, tak na imię mam" for the Eurovision Song Contest 2004, placing second in the Polish final. The band collected a number of awards from various Polish media outlets and embarked on their most extensive tour yet. The band's fifth album, Historie, których nie było (Stories That Haven't Happened), was released in June 2005 and introduced wind and string instruments into their pop rock repertoire. The first single was the uptempo number "Pierwsza łza", followed by the ballad "Przepraszam cię", the latter submitted to the Sopot International Song Festival contest where it came fourth in the semi-final. The album didn't sell as well as its predecessors, charting at number 11, but met with positive reviews.

In 2006, Łzy commemorated their 10th anniversary with the release of a greatest hits album in June, The Best of 1996–2006. It was promoted by a new ballad "Gdybyś był", which premiered at the Opole Festival and went on to be a radio hit in Poland. Its music video starred a popular Polish actor Jacek Poniedziałek. Although the album only peaked at number 11, it was certified platinum by ZPAV three years later for selling 32,000 copies. The band also released a DVD titled 1996–2006, consisting of live performances and all music videos. At the end of 2007, the band embarked on an acoustic tour in Poland and in early 2008, released a new single from The Best of 1996–2006, the rock track "Puste słowa". In spring 2009, Łzy gave a series of concerts for the Polish community in the US and the singer Anna Wyszkoni released a solo album, Pan i pani. The year turned out to be the band's most extensive yet in terms of touring, having performed 105 concerts.

=== 2010s: Wyszkoni's departure and new vocalist ===
In 2010, the band continued touring and performed a new song "Twoje serce" at the Baltic Song Contest in Karlshamn, Sweden, where it came fourth. November that year saw Wyszkoni's departure from the band to focus on a solo career. The band published an open call for a new vocalist to which over 650 candidates responded, and after over a month, recruited Sara Chmiel. Their first concert with the new vocalist took place in January 2011 and the band promptly started working on their sixth studio album. Bez słów... (Without Words...) was released by Universal Music Poland in May 2011 to mostly negative reviews and poor commercial performance, selling only around 3,000 copies. The band later reflected that the album was recorded in a rush and that they weren't very satisfied with the material. Two singles promoting the album, "Zatańcz ze mną, proszę" and "Bo każdej nocy", generated only minor interest.

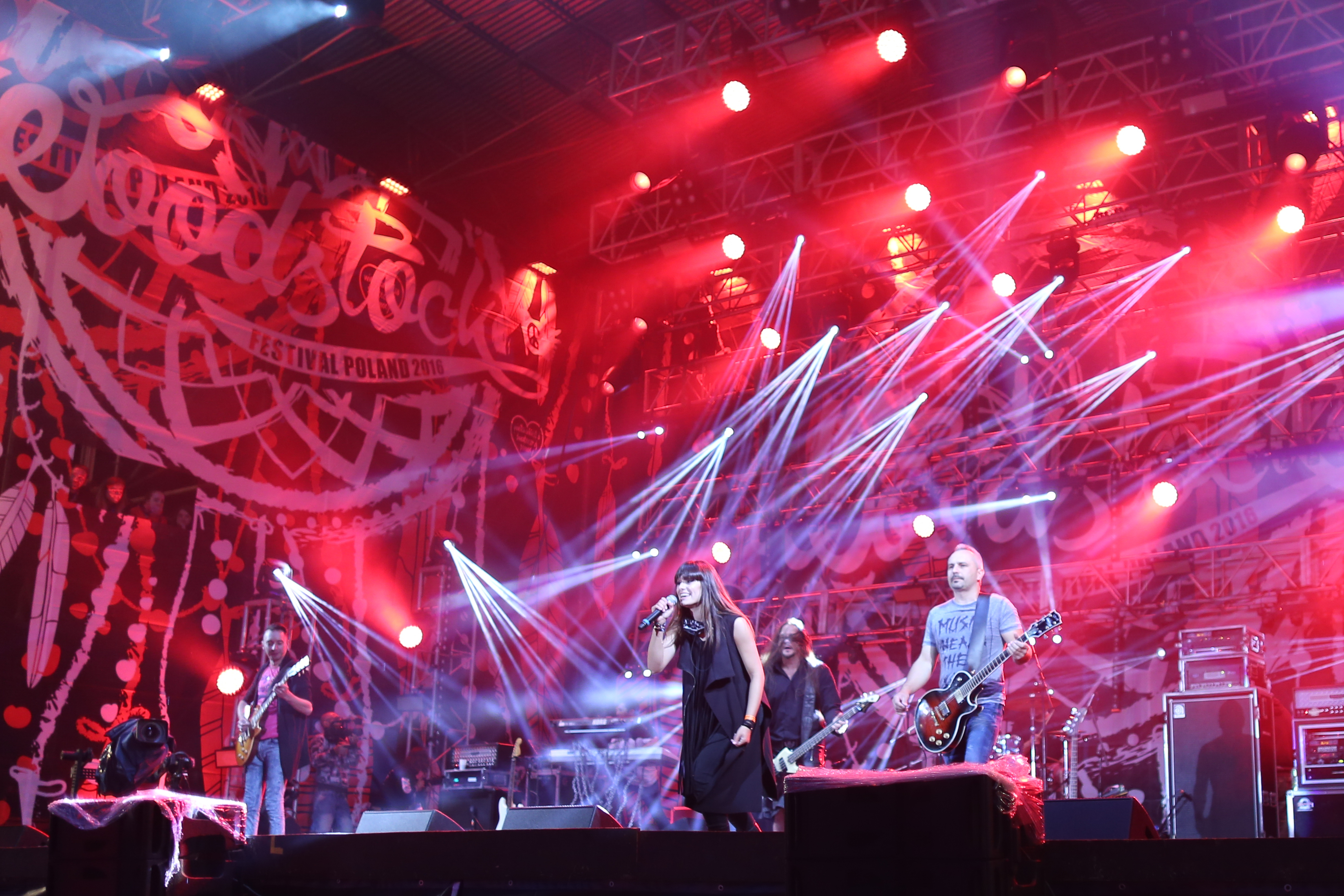
Łzy at Woodstock Festival Poland, 2016

Łzy released two singles in 2013, "Na nic nie czekam" and the moderately popular "Kiedy nie ma w nas miłości". The songs were recorded for their new studio album, Zbieg okoliczności (Coincidence), which saw the band collaborate with other producers and combine their rock-oriented sound with electronic music. Released by Warner Music Poland in March 2014, the album was not a commercial success and failed to chart. Later that year, the group performed at the Woodstock Festival in Poland. In 2015, Łzy released a new single "Jesteś powietrzem" and started working on new material. The two-disc album Łzy 20 consisted of new material and re-recorded hits to commemorate the group's 20th anniversary. It was promoted by moderately popular singles "Życie jest piękne" and "Czy możesz to dla mnie zrobić", but wasn't a commercial success and did not chart. The band again performed at the Woodstock Festival which resulted in a concert album Live Woodstock Festival Poland 2016, released in 2017. In 2018, Łzy released four songs as an EP called 2018. The band subsequently had short breaks from touring after the vocalist Sara gave birth to her children.

=== 2020s: Recent career ===
2021 saw the split of Łzy when Adam Konkol accused the band of dismissing him, to which they responded with clarification that he himself had abandoned the band. Although Konkol did not have exclusive rights to the group's name, he went on to recruit new musicians and form an alternative line-up of Łzy. They released singles "Agnieszka 2.0 Była mroźna zima" (a sequel to their trademark hit) and a new version of "Czy to grzech?". The original version of the band released a new album Miłość w czasach samotności (Love in the Times of Loneliness) in December 2021, promoted by singles "Za szczęście, za zdrowie, za miłość" and "Ta mała".

== Band members ==
Current members

- Daniel Arendarski – guitar (2021–present)
- Arkadiusz Dzierżawa – bass guitar (1996–present)
- Dawid Krzykała – drums (1996–present)
- Adrian Wieczorek – keyboards (1996–present)
- Rafał Trzaskalik – guitar (1999–present)
- Sara Chmiel – lead vocals (2011–present)

Past members

- Anna Wyszkoni – lead vocals (1996–2010)
- Sławomir Mocarski – keyboards (1996–1998)

== Discography ==
=== Albums ===
Studio albums

- 1998: Słońce
- 2000: W związku z samotnością
- 2002: Jesteś jaki jesteś
- 2003: Nie czekaj na jutro
- 2005: Historie, których nie było
- 2011: Bez słów...
- 2014: Zbieg okoliczności
- 2016: Łzy 20
- 2021: Miłość w czasach samotności
- 2023: Ok, Ok

Live albums

- 2017: Live Woodstock Festival Poland 2016

Compilation albums

- 2006: The Best of 1996–2006

Demo albums

- 1996: Demo

EPs

- 2018: 2018

=== Singles ===
- 1999: "Aniele mój"
- 2000: "Modlitwa"
- 2001: "Agnieszka już dawno..."
- 2001: "Narcyz się nazywam"
- 2001: "Opowiem wam jej historię"
- 2001: "Niebieska sukienka"
- 2002: "Jestem jaka jestem"
- 2002: "Ja nie lubię nikogo"
- 2002: "Anastazja, jestem"
- 2002: "Jestem dilerem"
- 2003: "Oczy szeroko zamknięte"
- 2003: "Anka, ot tak"
- 2004: "Julia, tak na imię mam"
- 2004: "Trochę wspomnień, tamtych dni"
- 2005: "Pierwsza łza"
- 2005: "Przepraszam cię"
- 2005: "Wróciłam"
- 2006: "Gdybyś był"
- 2006: "Całą sobą"
- 2008: "Puste słowa"
- 2011: "Zatańcz ze mną, proszę"
- 2011: "Bo każdej nocy"
- 2013: "Na nic nie czekam"
- 2013: "Kiedy nie ma w nas miłości"
- 2014: "Ogród naszych dni"
- 2015: "Jesteś powietrzem"
- 2016: "Życie jest piękne"
- 2016: "Czy możesz to dla mnie zrobić"
- 2016: "Jestem taka jestem"
- 2020: "Świat jest nasz"
- 2021: "Za szczęście, za zdrowie, za miłość"
- 2021: "Ta mała"
