= Anna Wyszkoni =

Polish singer (born 1980)

Ania Wyszkoni
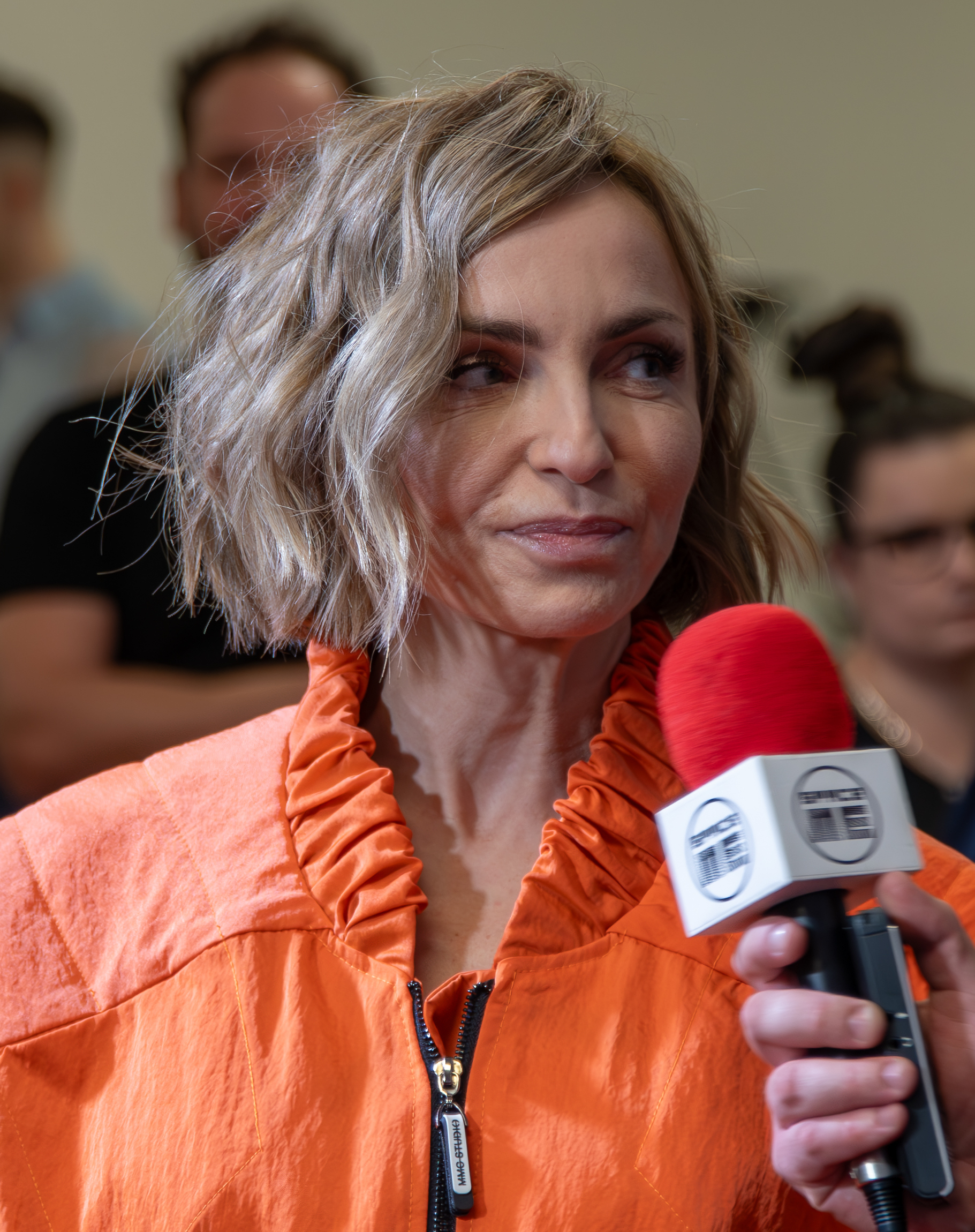
- Wyszkoni in 2024

Background information
- Born: Anna Maria Wyszkoni; 21 July 1980; Tworków, Poland
- Genres: Pop rock
- Occupation: Singer-songwriter
- Years active: 1996–present
- Labels: Sony Music Entertainment Poland, Universal Music Polska, Mystic Production
- Formerly of: Łzy
- Website: http://www.aniawyszkoni.pl/

Anna Wyszkoni (born 21 July 1980 in Tworków, Poland) is a Polish pop rock singer, composer and songwriter, also performing under the diminutive Ania Wyszkoni. Between 1996 and 2010, she was the lead singer in a popular Polish pop rock band Łzy, with whom she released six albums, four of which gold- or platinum-certified, and had multiple hits, such as "Agnieszka już dawno...", "Narcyz się nazywam", "Jestem jaka jestem" and "Oczy szeroko zamknięte", among others. Wyszkoni embarked on a solo career in 2008 and went on to release four albums, two double platinum and one gold. Her biggest solo hits include "Czy ten pan i pani", "Z ciszą pośród czterech ścian", "Lampa i sofa", "Wiem, że jesteś tam", "Zapytaj mnie o to, kochany", "W całość ułożysz mnie", "Biegnij przed siebie" and "Nie chcę cię obchodzić". In 2010, Polish music magazine Machina placed her on their list of "50 best Polish singers". She has sold around 450,000 units as of 2014, including her albums with Łzy.

== Biography ==
Wyszkoni was born in Tworków, a village in southern Poland, located at the Polish-Czech border. She attended a lyceum in the nearby town Racibórz. As a teenager, Wyszkoni won a local beauty contest and performed in various vocal groups.

=== With the band Łzy ===
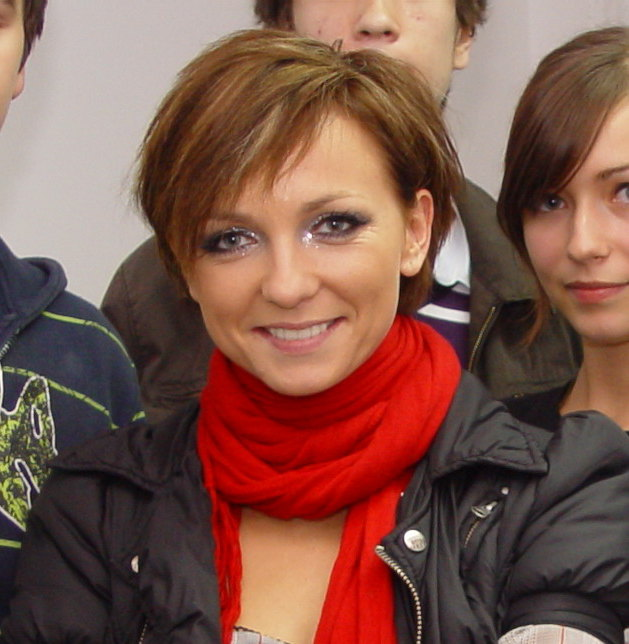
Wyszkoni in 2008

In 1996 Wyszkoni became the lead vocalist in the pop rock band Łzy which self-released their debut album Słońce (Sun) in December 1998, but it passed unnoticed. In 2000, she performed in an episode of a singing talent show Szansa na sukces and won the first place. Łzy's second album W związku z samotnością (In a Relationship with Loneliness) was released later that year and spawned the hit singles "Agnieszka już dawno..." and "Narcyz się nazywam" in 2001. The record reached number 4 in the Polish sales chart, was certified platinum and sold in around 125,000 copies. The band's third album, Jesteś jaki jesteś (You Are the Way You Are), followed in 2002 and spawned the hit "Jestem jaka jestem". It also reached number 4 and was certified gold in Poland.

In 2003 the band won the popularity contest at the National Festival of Polish Song in Opole with their new song "Oczy szeroko zamknięte". It went on to become their most commercially successful single yet, reaching number 1 in the Polish airplay chart. The song's popularity propelled the band into the mainstream and brought them more attention from the Polish media. Their next album Nie czekaj na jutro (Don't Wait for Tomorrow) was released in June 2003 and reached number 1 in the sales chart, staying in the top 3 for 10 consecutive weeks. It was certified platinum later in 2003 and sold around 75,000 copies. Łzy recorded the song "Julia, tak na imię mam" for the Eurovision Song Contest 2004, placing second in the Polish final.

The band's fifth album, Historie, których nie było (Stories That Haven't Happened), was released in June 2005 and although it didn't sell as well as its predecessors, charting at number 11, it met with positive reviews. The album included the ballad "Przepraszam cię" performed at the Sopot International Song Festival contest where it came fourth in the semi-final. In 2006, Łzy commemorated their 10th anniversary with the release of a greatest hits album The Best of 1996–2006. It was promoted by a new ballad "Gdybyś był", which premiered at the Opole Festival and went on to be a radio hit in Poland. The album only peaked at number 11, but was certified platinum three years later for selling 32,000 copies. Wyszkoni continued to perform with Łzy until late 2010 and officially departed from the band in November that year.

=== Solo career ===
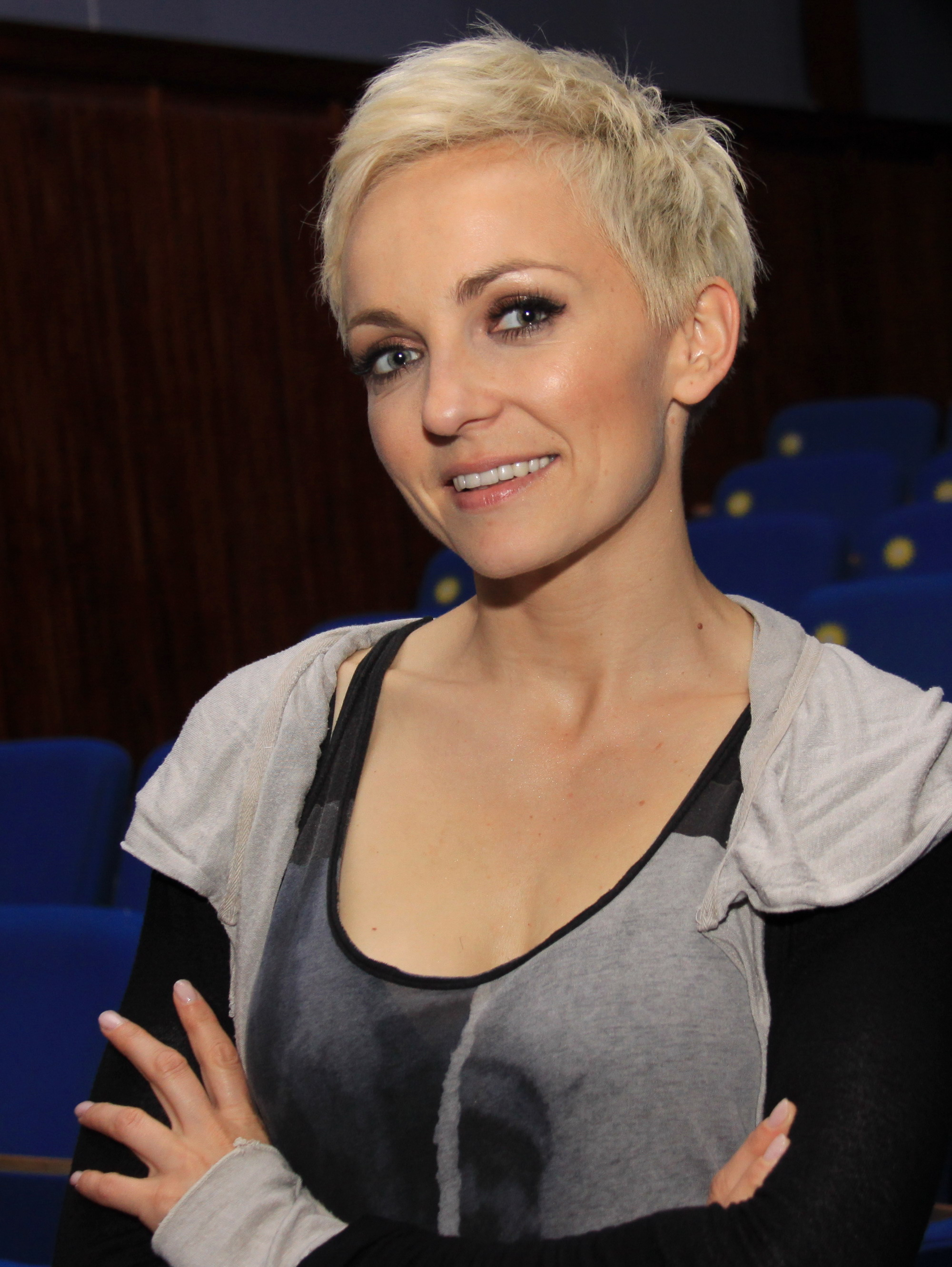
Wyszkoni in 2013

Wyszkoni collaborated with a Polish band Video for the song "Soft" in 2008, which was featured on their debut album Video gra. It came second in the semi-final at the Sopot International Song Festival and became a radio hit in Poland. In June 2009, she released her first solo album through Sony Music Entertainment Poland, titled Pan i pani (A Man and a Woman) which peaked at number 9 in the Polish album chart and was eventually certified double platinum for selling over 60,000 copies. The album spawned a string of popular singles in 2009 and 2010: "Czy ten pan i pani", "Z ciszą pośród czterech ścian", "Lampa i sofa" and "Wiem, że jesteś tam". The latter peaked at number 3 in the Polish airplay chart and won the "Hit of the Year" award at the Opole Festival in 2011.

In November 2012 Wyszkoni released her second solo album, Życie jest w porządku (Life's Alright), with the popular lead single "Zapytaj mnie o to, kochany", written by Marek Jackowski and Olga "Kora" Jackowska. The album peaked at number 14 in the chart and was certified gold after two months. It spawned further successful singles in 2013 and 2014: "W całość ułożysz mnie", "Biegnij przed siebie" (number 8 in the airplay chart) and "Prywatna Madonna", among others. It has since earned a double platinum certification for sales exceeding 60,000 copies. Wyszkoni has also recorded the song "Syberiada" with Piotr Cugowski and featured in two songs on Marek Jackowski's posthumous self-titled album. In autumn 2014, the singer took part in Dancing with the Stars: Taniec z gwiazdami where she won the second place.

In 2015 Wyszkoni duetted with Michał Bajor on the song "Ja kocham, ty kochasz" from his album Moja miłość. In November, she released a Christmas album Kolędy wielkie (The Great Carols) through Universal Music Polska, which consisted of traditional carols and original songs, including the single "Od nieba do nieba". In late 2016, Wyszkoni released a new single, "Oszukać los", which was met with popularity in Poland. In March 2017, she released a new album, Jestem tu nowa (I'm New Here), which reached number 5 and was certified gold. The album spawned another hit single "Nie chcę cię obchodzić" (number 9 in the airplay chart) and moderately successful tracks "Zanim to powiem" and "Mimochodem". In 2019, Wyszkoni featured with her daughter in a song "Różowe okulary" by Polish children's group My3 and released a standalone single "Księżyc nad Juratą".

In 2020 Wyszkoni took part in performances celebrating the 100th birthday of Pope John Paul II, organized by TVP. She has also completed an interior design course and went on to host a reality show Design Dream. Pojedynek na wnętrza on Polish TV channel Polsat in spring 2021. Later that year, she premiered a new single, "Skrable", which showcased her new image and musical direction. In October, Wyszkoni released Nieznośna lekkość hitu (The Unbearable Lightness of a Hit), a compilation marking the 25th anniversary of her musical career. The album reached number 17 in the Polish sales chart. In November 2022, she released a new studio album, Z cegieł i łez (Made of Bricks and Tears) through the independent label Mystic Production, which debuted at number 8 in the sales charts in Poland. Her next album, 10, released in December 2023, was a collection of ten covers of songs written by Marek Jackowski for the band Maanam. The album was commemorating the 10th anniversary of Jackowski's passing. It charted at number 56 in Poland.

== Personal life ==
She was married to Adam Piguła with whom she has a son Tobiasz, born in December 2001. Since 2004, she has been in a relationship with her manager Maciej Durczak, the founder of a PR company Rock House Entertainment, with whom she has a daughter Pola, born in February 2012. They live in Pasikurowice.

In 2016, she was diagnosed with thyroid cancer.

== Discography ==
=== Studio albums ===
- 2009: Pan i pani
- 2012: Życie jest w porządku
- 2015: Kolędy wielkie
- 2017: Jestem tu nowa
- 2022: Z cegieł i łez
- 2023: 10

=== Compilations ===
- 2021: Nieznośna lekkość hitu

=== Singles ===
- 2008: "Soft" (with Video)
- 2009: "Czy ten pan i pani"
- 2009: "Z ciszą pośród czterech ścian"
- 2010: "Lampa i sofa"
- 2010: "Wiem, że jesteś tam"
- 2011: "Graj chłopaku graj"
- 2011: "Po to jesteś tu"
- 2012: "Zapytaj mnie o to, kochany"
- 2013: "W całość ułożysz mnie"
- 2013: "Syberiada" (with Piotr Cugowski)
- 2013: "Dźwięki nocy"
- 2014: "Odnajdziemy się" (with Marek Jackowski)
- 2014: "Na cześć wariata"
- 2014: "Biegnij przed siebie"
- 2014: "Prywatna Madonna"
- 2015: "Dzięki za dźwięki"
- 2015: "Ja kocham, ty kochasz" (with Michał Bajor)
- 2015: "Od nieba do nieba"
- 2016: "Oszukać los"
- 2017: "Nie chcę cię obchodzić"
- 2017: "Zanim to powiem"
- 2017: "Mimochodem"
- 2018: "Cisza tak dobrze brzmi"
- 2019: "Różowe okulary" (with My3)
- 2019: "Księżyc nad Juratą"
- 2021: "Skrable"
- 2021: "Czułość proszę"
- 2022: "Agnieszka" (with Tymek i Pham)
- 2022: "Było minęło"
- 2022: "Z cegieł i łez"
- 2023: "Dla ciebie"
- 2023: "Ciemna strona" (with Rena and Liroy)
- 2023: "Lucciola"
