= Bluebirds Flying High =

- Single cover

Single by James Fox with Cardiff City F.C.
- Released: May 5, 2008
- Recorded: 2008
- Genre: Pop, Football song
- Length: 3:46
- Label: Plastic Tomato Records
- Songwriter(s): James Fox, Mads Louis Hauge
- Producer(s): James Fox/Mads Hauge

James Fox singles chronology
"Hold Onto Our Love" (2004)	"Bluebirds Flying High" (2008)	"Higher" (2008)

Bluebirds Flying High is a song written by British singer-songwriter James Fox. It was recorded as Cardiff City F.C.'s official song for the 2008 FA Cup Final. It was released as a single in May 2008 and charted at a peak position of number 15 in the UK Singles Chart. The song features backing vocals from members of the Cardiff City football squad.

== Background ==
Each year the teams that reach the FA Cup Final traditionally produce an official song to commemorate the occasion, featuring vocals from the players. James Fox, a fan of Cardiff City since 1983 when he was a ball boy during a league match at Ninian Park, wrote the song following Cardiff's third round victory against non-league side Chasetown in January 2008. He said in an interview with the Western Mail that "[The song] didn't take long to write. Being a Cardiff fan, it kind of wrote itself. I’ve always wanted to play for Cardiff but that was never going to happen so every year I just thought if they get to have a Cup song, if they get that far, I’ve got to be prepared." He later commented "As a record, it doesn’t break any new ground. It’s just a catchy tune that hopefully the supporters will latch on to."

== Track listing ==
1. "Bluebirds Flying High" - 3:46
2. "Bluebirds Flying High" (karaoke version) - 3:46
3. Road to Wembley multimedia content

== Promotion ==
Fox performed the song for the first time at the Hard Rock Cafe in Cardiff in front of competition winners as well as Cardiff chairman Peter Ridsdale.

== Reception ==
=== Popularity ===
The song was popular amongst the staff of Cardiff City. Manager Dave Jones said "It is a really catchy song and it’s good that James is a big fan, as he has really captured the mood and the energy – the enthusiasm is superb. The lads loved the song and everyone is behind it. I’m sure it will be a massive success." Cardiff chairman Peter Ridsdale called it a "great song".

=== Critical reception ===
Digital Spy's Alex Fletcher awarded the song 2/5, writing "the odds of anybody outside of Cardiff City FC remembering this tune in a year's time is roughly equal to your local pub team's chances of winning the Champions' League."

== Charts ==
The song charted at number 15 in the UK Singles Chart on its first week of release. It reached number one in the official UK indie singles chart and the Welsh singles chart.

Chart (2008)	Peak position
UK Singles Chart	15
UK Indie Chart	1
