= The Ayatollah (football celebration) =

Football celebration of Cardiff City FC

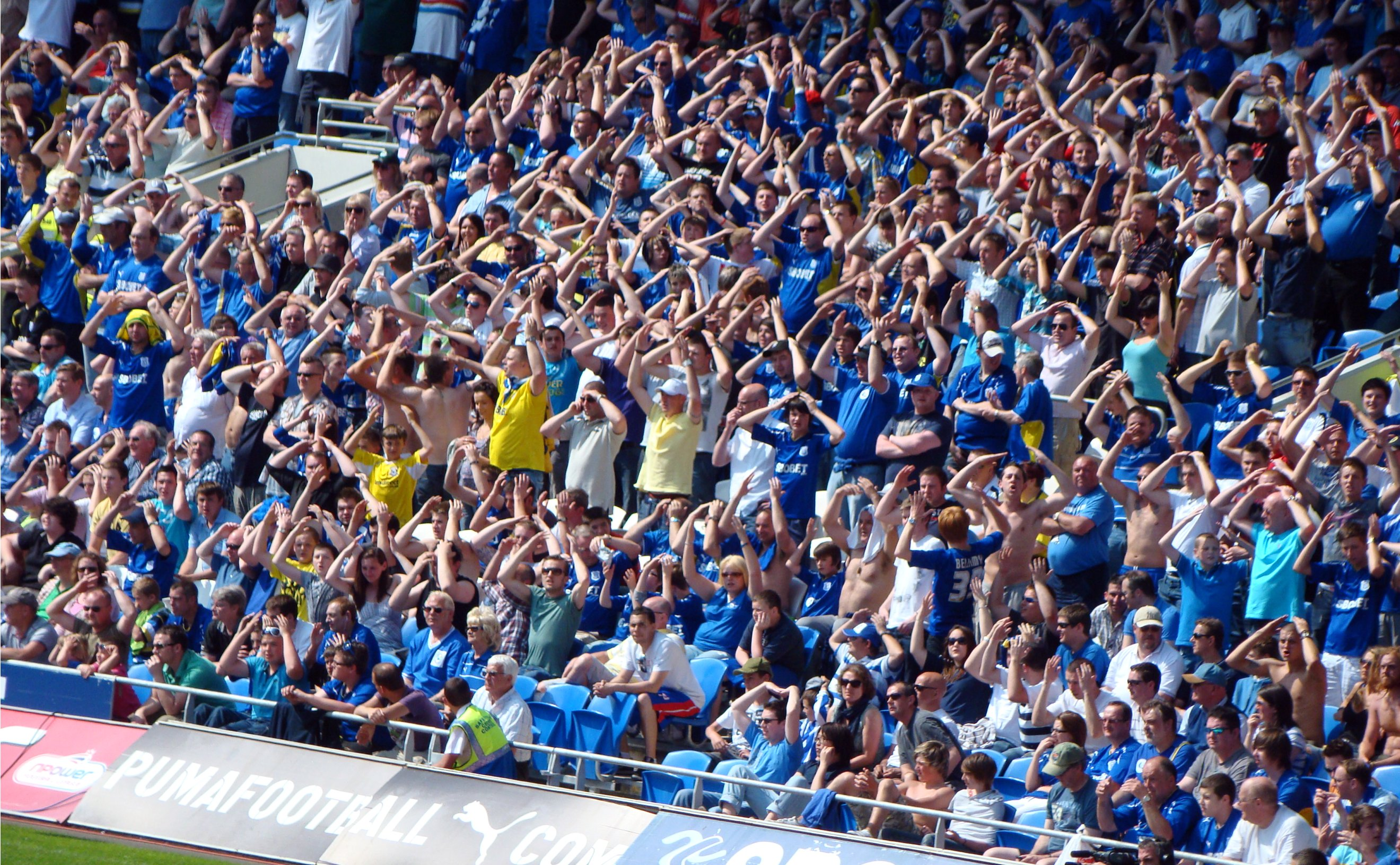
Cardiff City fans performing "the Ayatollah", 23 April 2011

The Ayatollah is a football celebration used by fans of the Welsh football club, Cardiff City. Performing the action is sometimes preceded by a chant of "do the Ayatollah".

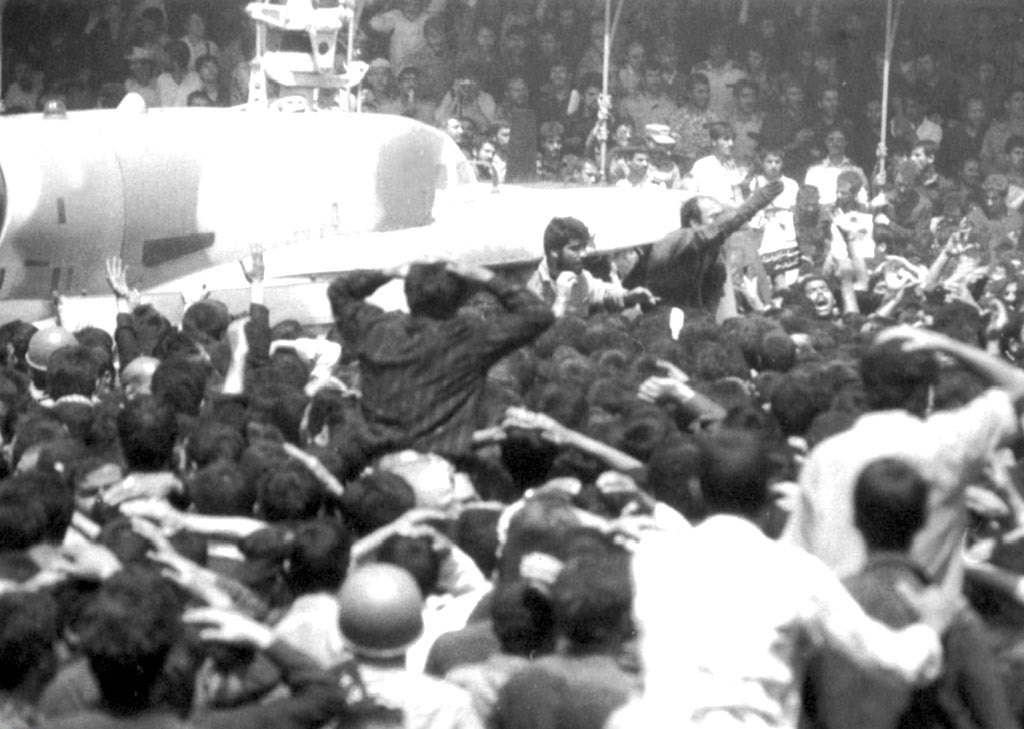
Funeral of Ruhollah Khomeini, 4 June 1989

== Action ==
Performing the Ayatollah is done by having both hands flat pointing towards each other, raised above the head, and repeatedly moving them up and down in a patting motion.

== Origins ==
The Ayatollah celebration came into use at the Cardiff City games in 1990. It was originally performed by the singers and fans of a Welsh-language punk group called U Thant. It was first performed by the Cardiff City fans at the Sincil Bank, home of Lincoln City, on 15 September 1990, the day after U Thant had played a gig at Cardiff's Chapter Arts Centre. U Thant's singer had been inspired by footage of attendants at the funeral of Ayatollah Khomeini, which was broadcast live on British TV, doing the movement to express their grief at his death.

It has been claimed that it was initially used as a sign of despair at the way the team was playing. It quickly became very popular with the fans of the club and has since been used in terms of celebration and support for the team. Away games at Hereford United and Peterborough United in 1992 helped cement its place in the fans' repertoire.

The start of the Ayatollah has often mistakenly been credited to the former chairman Sam Hammam. This is probably due to the national coverage of Hammam performing the celebration pitchside and in front of the visiting Leeds fans, drawing criticism from the then-Leeds manager David O'Leary, the Football Association and a BBC undercover report, following the 2–1 victory over Leeds United in the third round of the FA Cup in 2002, which saw crowd trouble after the final whistle.

== Use ==
=== Supporters: Cardiff City ===
The Ayatollah is now performed by the supporters of Cardiff City at every match. They, in turn, sing for each stand at their former home ground Ninian Park and current home ground Cardiff City Stadium to "Do the Ayatollah". During matches, players performing well in the game, or players who have just been brought on during the match, are called to "Do the Ayatollah". Arsenal's former Cardiff player, Aaron Ramsey, also did not celebrate his second goal against Cardiff, instead doing the Ayatollah in a Premier League match in November 2013.

Other people in the ground are also often called on to perform the move, including the team's manager, away fans, former players on opposing sides (although managers of the teams have strongly discouraged it so it is rarely performed), and police officers on duty at the match.

Doing the Ayatollah has also become popular for famous Cardiff fans to do when celebrating. The ex-Wales rugby union team captain Gareth Thomas often performed the Ayatollah after scoring a try, the swimmer David Davies performed the Ayatollah on the podium while receiving his medal at the 2006 Commonwealth Games and at the 2008 Olympics, and the cricketer Simon Jones also used the celebration after taking the wicket of Simon Katich during the 2005 Ashes series. Mark Webster, winner of the 2008 BDO World Darts Championship, also performed the Ayatollah after winning the title. The Ayatollah has also been used by ice hockey fans of the Cardiff Devils when winning the Play-off Championship in 1999. The Big Brother housemate and Cardiff supporter David Vaughan frequently did the Ayatollah after winning tasks in the house in 2010.

Former Cardiff players and footballers who are fans of Cardiff have often performed the Ayatollah at the home grounds of the Bluebirds' bitter rivals Swansea City. The midfielder Gavin Williams, a lifelong Cardiff fan, performed it at Vetch Field after scoring against them for his former club Yeovil Town, and the former Cardiff player Christian Roberts performed the Ayatollah when he scored against them at the Liberty Stadium after being verbally abused throughout the match for being a former Cardiff player. The Nottingham Forest winger Arron Davies said that he would love to become the first player to "do the Ayatollah" at Wembley Stadium had he and his then team, Yeovil Town, reached the Football League One play-off final. The former player Joe Ledley performed the Ayaltollah while celebrating Crystal Palace's late won point at the Liberty on 2 March 2014. Cameron Jerome celebrated his goal in a 1–0 for Norwich away at Cardiff on 4 February 2017.

=== The Ayatollah World Cup ===
In recognition of the long established routine of "Doing the Ayatollah", leading Cardiff City forum CardiffCityForum.com, ran a competition to find the best Ayatollah celebration carried out by former and current players, coaches and managers. The competition was devised and run by Cardiff City fan Woody who also designed and created the trophy using a 3D Printer. The competition reached its finale in August 2021 when Oumar Niasse was announced as the winner, beating Aaron Ramsey in the inaugural Final with 74.2% of the vote.

Ayatollah World Cup Winners
Year	Winner	Percentage	Runner-up	Percentage
2021	Oumar Niasse	74.2%	Aaron Ramsey	25.8%

=== In song ===
The Ayatollah was the focus of two songs written in support of the club before they played in the 2008 FA Cup Final. A group of supporters released a song named "Do The Ayatollah!" and a different song under the same title was written by one of the club's players, Steve Thompson.

== See also ==
- Goal celebration
- The "Do the Ayatollah" song is based on Macarena
