= Jemini =

British pop group

- Also known as: Tricity
- Origin: Liverpool, England
- Genres: Pop, dance
- Years active: 1995–2004, 2013–present
- Label: Integral Records (2003)
- Past members: Chris Cromby; Gemma Abbey

Jemini (formerly Tricity) are a British pop group from Liverpool, best known for scoring nul points and finishing in last place at the Eurovision Song Contest 2003 with "Cry Baby".

== Early career ==
Chris Cromby and Gemma Abbey (born 10 March 1981) met in 1995 at Liverpool's Starlight Stage School and toured Liverpool's pubs and clubs with the academy's kids' roadshow. At 16, after leaving college, they formed Tricity, named after the brand of electrical appliances. They changed their name to Jemini ("Gem-and-I") at the age of 19. They spent the next two and a half years touring pubs and clubs in the UK performing Stevie Wonder, Randy Crawford and Motown covers and ABBA medleys, as well as their own compositions. Abbey stated she has loved the Eurovision Song Contest since childhood, and counts previous Eurovision entrants such as Sonia, Precious and Dana International amongst her favourites.

== "Cry Baby" ==
Jemini and the song "Cry Baby" were selected to represent the United Kingdom in the Eurovision Song Contest 2003 in Riga, Latvia, after winning the BBC's national selection A Song for Europe. Their performance at Eurovision was criticised for being off-key, and later earned the UK nul points.

=== Failure and break-up ===
The Eurovision failure prompted both mirth and consternation in the British media. Jemini admitted that their performance was off-key, and claimed they were unable to hear the backing track due to a technical fault. Terry Wogan, long-time commentator on the contest for the BBC, claimed that the UK was suffering from "post-Iraq backlash". Following their failure at Eurovision, they were dropped by their record label, Integral Records UK, and their planned album was never released. "Cry Baby" entered the UK Singles Chart at No. 15, but spent only three weeks in the chart. They later split up as a duo.

=== Reunions ===
In 2013, the duo reunited for a special interview about their performance in a two-hour-long BBC Three special How to Win Eurovision. The special aired on 11 May 2013. In 2014, the duo reunited once again to take part in a Eurovision special of Pointless Celebrities, and have subsequently appeared in several television interviews about their Eurovision experience.

== Legal issues ==
Abbey was arrested and sentenced for social security fraud in November 2016. She was claiming as a single mother when she had undergone a wedding ceremony in Algarve in 2013 and was living with her partner. She overclaimed tax credits for her daughter born in 2009. She was given a 30-week prison sentence, suspended for one year, and put on supervision order for one year.

== Discography ==
=== Singles ===
Single with chart position
Title	Year	Chart positions
Title	Year	UK
"Cry Baby"	2003	15

Awards and achievements
Preceded by Jessica Garlick with "Come Back"	UK in the Eurovision Song Contest; 2003	Succeeded by James Fox with "Hold On to Our Love"
