= Poland in the Eurovision Song Contest 2004 =

- Eurovision Song Contest 2004
- Participating broadcaster: Telewizja Polska (TVP)
- Country: Poland
- Selection process: Krajowe Eliminacje do Konkursu Piosenki Eurowizji 2004
- Selection date: 24 January 2004

Competing entry
- Song: "Love Song"
- Artist: Blue Café
- Songwriters: Tatiana Okupnik; Paweł Rurak-Sokal

Placement
- Final result: 17th, 27 points

Participation chronology

Poland was represented at the Eurovision Song Contest 2004 with the song "Love Song", composed by Paweł Rurak-Sokal, with lyrics by Tatiana Okupnik, and performed by the band Blue Café. The Polish participating broadcaster, Telewizja Polska (TVP), organised the national final Krajowe Eliminacje do Konkursu Piosenki Eurowizji 2004 in order to select its entry for the contest. The national final took place on 24 January 2004 and featured fifteen entries. "Love Song" performed by Blue Café was selected as the winner after gaining the most votes from the public with 57,125 votes.

As one of ten highest placed finishers in the 2003 contest Poland directly qualified to compete in the final of the Eurovision Song Contest which took place on 15 May 2004. Performing in position 19, Poland placed seventeenth out of the 24 participating countries with 27 points.

== Background ==
Prior to the 2004 Contest, Telewizja Polska (TVP) had participated in the Eurovision Song Contest representing Poland eight times since its first entry in 1994. Its highest placement in the contest, to this point, has been second place, achieved with its debut entry in 1994 with the song "To nie ja!" performed by Edyta Górniak. It has only, thus far, reached the top ten on one other occasion, when "Keine Grenzen – Żadnych granic" performed by Ich Troje finished seventh in 2003.

As part of its duties as participating broadcaster, TVP organises the selection of its entry in the Eurovision Song Contest and broadcasts the event in the country. The broadcaster confirmed its participation in the 2004 contest on 6 September 2003. In 2003, TVP organised a televised national final for the first time that featured a competition among several artists and songs in order to select its entry, a selection procedure that continued for its 2004 entry.

== Before Eurovision ==
=== Krajowe Eliminacje do Konkursu Piosenki Eurowizji 2004 ===
Krajowe Eliminacje do Konkursu Piosenki Eurowizji 2004 was the national final organised by TVP in order to select its entry for the Eurovision Song Contest 2004. The show took place on 24 January 2004 at the Studio 5 of TVP in Warsaw, hosted by Tomasz Kammel and Magdalena Mołek. Public televoting exclusively selected the winner. The show was broadcast on TVP1 and TVP Polonia as well as streamed online at the broadcaster's website tvp.pl. The national final was watched by 6.5 million viewers in Poland with a market share of 39.5%.

==== Competing entries ====
TVP opened a submission period for interested artists and songwriters to submit their entries between 6 September 2003 and 5 November 2003. The broadcaster received 73 submissions at the closing of the deadline. A seven-member selection committee selected nine entries from the received submissions to compete in the national final. The selection committee consisted of Marek Sierocki (music journalist and artistic directors of the Opole Festival and Sopot Festival), Janusz Kosiński (journalist), Hirek Wrona (journalist), Zygmunt Kukla (conductor, composer), Piotr Metz (programme director of Radio Eska), Piotr Klatt (musician, songwriter, journalist and music producer at TVP) and Bartosz Jastrzębowski (director). The selected entries were announced on 6 November 2003.

==== Final ====
The televised final took place on 24 January 2004. Fifteen entries competed and the winner, "Love Song" performed by Blue Café, was determined entirely by a public vote. In addition to the performances of the competing entries, singer In-Grid and Sertab Erener (who won Eurovision for Turkey in 2003) performed as the interval acts.

Final – 24 January 2004
| R/O | Artist | Song | Songwriter(s) | Televote | Place |
|---|---|---|---|---|---|
| 1 | Łukasz Zagrobelny and Offside | "Dreaming About You" | Artur Ambroziak, Roberto Kalicki, Krzystof Czub | 5,532 | 12 |
| 2 | Małgorzata Ostrowska | "Nie uwierzę" | Małgorzata Ostrowska, Ken Rose, Kip Winger | 1,431 | 15 |
| 3 | Goya | "All My Senses" | Goya, Magdalena Wójcik | 24,566 | 6 |
| 4 | Kasia Klich | "Let Me Introduce" | Katarzyna Klich, Jarosław Płocica | 15,090 | 8 |
| 5 | Planeta | "Easy Money" | Jacek Adamczyk | 9,648 | 9 |
| 6 | Sistars | "Freedom" | Natialia Przybysz, Marek Piotrowski, Bartek Królik | 22,107 | 7 |
| 7 | Janusz Radek | "Pocztówka z Avignon" | Andrzej Mogielnicki, Romuald Lipko | 28,607 | 5 |
| 8 | Golden Life | "Labyrinth of Life" | Golden Life, Iwona Turbiar | 6,690 | 11 |
| 9 | Blue Café | "Love Song" | Tatiana Okupnik, Paweł Rurak-Sokal | 57,125 | 1 |
| 10 | Łzy | "Julia, tak na imię mam" | Anna Wyszkoni, Adam Konkol | 54,625 | 2 |
| 11 | Alex | "I'm Still Alive" | Samuel Engh, Leif Sundin, Daniel Boquist, Mark Tysper | 30,952 | 4 |
| 12 | Krzysztof Kiljański | "Stay" | Krzysztof Kiljański, Witold Cisło | 7,835 | 10 |
| 13 | Magda Steczkowska and Indigo | "Mogę dziś" | Indigo, Edyta Warszawska | 2,008 | 14 |
| 14 | Kowalski | "Sen Kowalskiego" | Kowalski, Robert Brunne | 3,697 | 13 |
| 15 | Marcin Rozynek | "Nick of Time" | Marcin Rozynek | 51,736 | 3 |

== At Eurovision ==
According to Eurovision rules, all nations with the exceptions of the host country, the "Big Four" (France, Germany, Spain and the United Kingdom) and the ten highest placed finishers in the 2003 contest are required to qualify from the semi-final in order to compete for the final; the top ten countries from the semi-final progress to the final. As Poland finished seventh in the 2003 contest, the nation automatically qualified to compete in the final on 15 May 2004. On 23 March 2004, an allocation draw was held which determined the running order and Poland was set to perform in position 19 in the final, following the entry from Ireland and before the entry from the United Kingdom. Poland placed seventeenth in the final, scoring 27 points.

Only the final was broadcast in Poland on TVP1 and TVP Polonia with commentary by Artur Orzech. The Polish spokesperson, who announced the Polish votes during the final, was Maciej Orłoś.

=== Voting ===
Below is a breakdown of points awarded to Poland and awarded by Poland in the grand final of the contest. The nation awarded its 12 points to Ukraine in the final of the contest.

Following the release of the televoting figures by the EBU after the conclusion of the competition, it was revealed that a total of 72,295 televotes were cast in Poland during the final.

Points awarded to Poland (Final)
| Score | Country |
|---|---|
| 12 points | |
| 10 points | |
| 8 points | |
| 7 points | Lithuania |
| 6 points | |
| 5 points | Ukraine |
| 4 points | Germany; Greece |
| 3 points | Iceland |
| 2 points | Cyprus |
| 1 point | Spain; Sweden |

Points awarded by Poland (Final)
| Score | Country |
|---|---|
| 12 points | Ukraine |
| 10 points | Sweden |
| 8 points | Turkey |
| 7 points | Greece |
| 6 points | Germany |
| 5 points | Serbia and Montenegro |
| 4 points | Cyprus |
| 3 points | Malta |
| 2 points | United Kingdom |
| 1 point | Spain |
