= Blue Café =

Polish musical group

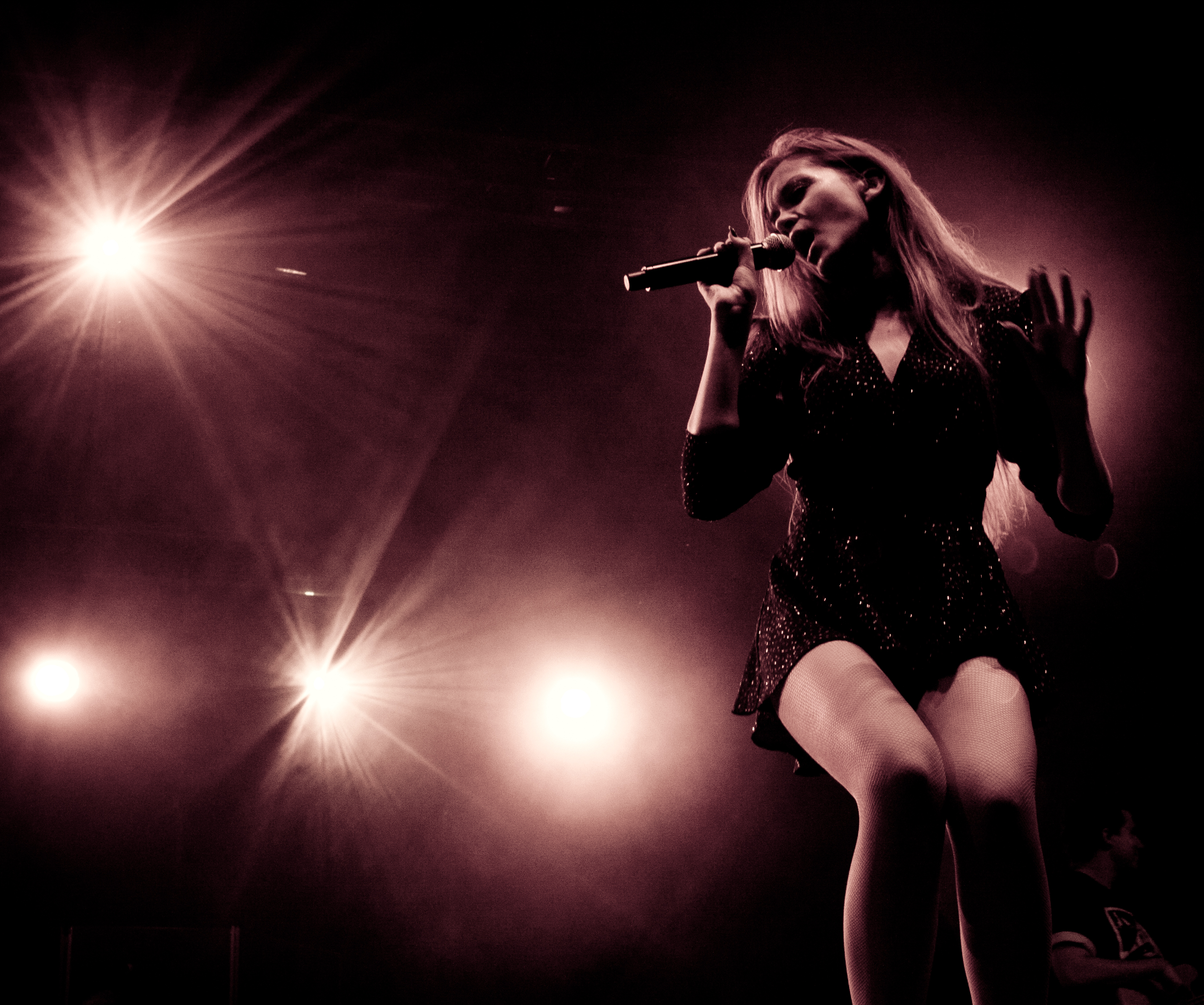
- Current lead singer Dominika Gawęda

Background information
- Also known as: Blue Café
- Origin: Łódź, Poland
- Genre: jazz, soul
- Members: Tatiana Okupnik; Viola Danel; Sebastian Kasprowicz; Marcin Markuszewski; Piotr Sławiński; Michał Niewiadomski
- Past members: Łukasz Moszczyński
- Website: http://www.blue-cafe.pl/ Official Site

Blue Café is a Polish musical group with jazz, soul and Latin influences. The band was formed in Łódź in 1998 and had three consecutive hit singles in Poland in 2002-03. They were nominated in the category Best Polish Act at the 2003 MTV Europe Awards, and are also known internationally for representing Poland in the Eurovision Song Contest 2004.

== Band members ==
The original line-up of the band was leader, composer, arranger and keyboardist Paweł Rurak-Sokal, singer Tatiana Okupnik, Viola Danel (guitar), Sebastian Kasprowicz (guitar), Marcin Markuszewski (bass), Piotr Sławiński (trumpet) and Michał Niewiadomski (trombone).

Former members include Łukasz Moszczyński (drums), who died on 15 July 2025, aged 48.

== History ==
Their first single "Español" was released in 2001, with album Fanaberia following in late 2002.

Blue Café submitted "You May Be in Love", a track from Fanaberia, to the 2003 Polish Eurovision Song Contest selection, where it made the final, finishing in third place. It subsequently topped the Polish chart when released as a single. The following year, the band took part in the Eurovision selection again with "Love Song", a Latin-flavoured track from their second album Demi-sec. In a close televoting and SMS result, "Love Song" emerged the winner, earning Blue Café the Polish ticket for the 49th Eurovision Song Contest. 2004 was the year in which a pre-qualifying semi-final was introduced to Eurovision; however, Ich Troje's top 10 finish for Poland the previous year meant that Blue Café gained automatic entry to the final, which was held in Istanbul on 15 May. Five members - Okupnik, Rurak-Sokal, Sławiński, Niewiadomski and newcomer Piotr Grąbkowski - appeared on stage on the night of the contest, when "Love Song" finished in 17th place of 24 entries.

Okupnik decided to leave the band in 2005, and was replaced as lead singer by Dominika Gawęda. The band's fourth and most recent album, Four Seasons, was released in 2008.

== Discography ==
Title	Album details	Peak chart positions	Sales	Certifications
Title	Album details	POL	Sales	Certifications
Fanaberia	Released: 20 May 2002; Label: Pomaton EMI; Formats: CD, digital download	3		POL: Platinum
Demi-sec	Released: 8 December 2003; Label: Pomaton EMI; Formats: CD, digital download	3	POL: 35,000+	POL: Gold
Ovosho	Released: 18 September 2006; Label: EMI Music Poland; Formats: CD, digital download	10	POL: 15,000+	POL: Gold
Four Seasons	Released: 14 April 2008; Label: QL Music; Formats: CD	4		
DaDa	Released: 28 March 2011; Label: Universal Music Poland; Formats: CD, digital download	7	POL: 30,000+	POL: Platinum
"—" denotes a recording that did not chart or was not released in that territory.

Awards and achievements
Preceded by Ich Troje with "Keine Grenzen – Żadnych granic"	Poland in the Eurovision Song Contest; 2004	Succeeded by Ivan & Delfin with "Czarna dziewczyna"
