= Cry Baby (Jemini song) =

2003 song by Jemini

Single by Jemini
- Released: 2003
- Songwriter: Martin Isherwood

Eurovision Song Contest 2003 entry
- Country: United Kingdom
- Artists: Chris Cromby; Gemma Abbey
- As: Jemini
- Language: English
- Composer: Martin Isherwood
- Lyricist: Martin Isherwood

Finals performance
- Final result: 26th
- Final points: 0

Entry chronology
- ◄ "Come Back" (2002)
- "Hold Onto Our Love" (2004) ►

"Cry Baby", is a song written by Martin Isherwood, and performed by the duo Jemini. It represented the United Kingdom in the Eurovision Song Contest 2003. It was the first of two songs entered by the United Kingdom to earn no points (nul points) from any other countries. It was also the first ever English-language song to receive no points.

The song is a simple pop ditty about a woman telling her lover that their relationship is over because he does not love her anymore. He sings back saying she is being unfair, prolonging the relationship while he has his own life to live.

== Selection process ==
Jemini were selected to take part in Eurovision by a public phone poll in the BBC's A Song for Europe competition. More than 100,000 votes cast in total for the duo.

It was revealed in an interview with the band Steps on BBC Radio 2, Scott Mills breakfast show that Claire & H (from Steps, in their solo act) were supposed to be the act for that year, but pulled out last minute, and Jemini replaced them.

== Eurovision performance ==
For their Eurovision appearance, Chris Cromby and Gemma Abbey were accompanied on stage by three female backing singers, and a guitarist.

The Eurovision failure prompted a great deal of mirth and consternation in the British and European media. Jemini admitted that their performance was off-key, and claimed they were unable to hear the backing track due to a technical fault. Terry Wogan, long-time commentator on the contest for the BBC, said that the UK was suffering from "post-Iraq backlash". However, the majority of the media blamed the result on the poor quality of the song and that it was sung out of tune, with Louis Walsh branding the song "a disgrace" and "so out of tune they deserved to be last". Following the show, their dressing room was broken into and vandalised.

Author and historian John Kennedy O'Connor notes in The Eurovision Song Contest – The Official History that with a record field of 26 entries, this made the UK's failure the most spectacular in the history of the contest. This would not be the only occasion that the UK has scored no points, with "Embers" performed by James Newman also achieving the same feat in 2021.

== Charts ==
Chart performance for "Cry Baby"
Chart (2003)	Peak position
UK Singles (Official Charts Company)	15

Preceded by "Come Back" by Jessica Garlick	United Kingdom in the Eurovision Song Contest; 2003	Succeeded by "Hold Onto Our Love" by James Fox
